= Football at the 2025 SEA Games – Men's team squads =

List of footballers

The men's football tournament at the 2025 SEA Games was an sub-continental football tournament held in Thailand from 3 to 18 December 2025. The nine participating national teams were required to submit squads of 23 players – of which three has to be goalkeepers. All players in the list had to be born on or after 1 January 2003. Only players in these squads were eligible to take part in the tournament.

The age listed for each player is on 3 December 2025, the first day of the tournament. The numbers of caps and goals listed for each player do not include any matches played after the start of the tournament. The club listed is the club for which the player last played a competitive match prior to the tournament. (Note: This is the club a player was last able to play for during the previous season in the event a player did not play a competitive match.) The nationality for each club reflects the national association (not the league) to which the club is affiliated. A flag is included for coaches who are of a different nationality than their own national team.

== Group A ==
=== Thailand ===
Thailand announced their final squad on 21 November 2025.

Head coach: Thawatchai Damrong-Ongtrakul

No.	Pos.	Player	Date of birth (age)	Caps	Goals	Club
1	GK	Sorawat Phosaman	30 January 2003 (aged 22)			(Football Association of Thailand) Songkhla
2	DF	Chanon Tamma	19 March 2004 (aged 21)			(Football Association of Thailand) BG Pathum United
3	DF	Pattarapon Suksakit	19 August 2003 (aged 22)			(Football Association of Thailand) Sukhothai
4	DF	Chanapach Buaphan	{22 March 2004 (aged 21)			(Football Association of Thailand) BG Pathum United
5	MF	Seksan Ratree (captain)	14 March 2003 (aged 22)			(Football Association of Thailand) Rayong
6	MF	Sittha Boonlha	2 September 2004 (aged 21)			(Football Association of Thailand) Port
7	MF	Kakana Khamyok	21 May 2004 (aged 21)			(Football Association of Thailand) Muangthong United
8	FW	Thanawut Phochai	2 December 2005 (aged 20)			(Football Association of Thailand) Nongbua Pitchaya
9	FW	Yotsakorn Burapha	8 June 2005 (aged 20)			(Football Association of Singapore) Hougang United
10	MF	Thanakrit Chotmuangpak	6 January 2006 (aged 19)			(Football Association of Thailand) Buriram United
11	FW	Siraphop Wandee	22 January 2004 (aged 21)			(Football Association of Thailand) Chonburi
12	DF	Waris Choolthong	8 January 2004 (aged 21)			(Football Association of Thailand) BG Pathum United
13	DF	Wichan Inaram	20 July 2007 (aged 18)			(Football Association of Thailand) Bangkok United
14	FW	Chinngoen Phutonyong	15 August 2003 (aged 22)			(Football Association of Thailand) Chiangrai United
15	DF	Chaiyaphon Otton	4 April 2003 (aged 22)			(Football Association of Thailand) Sukhothai
16	DF	Pichitchai Sienkrathok	18 May 2003 (aged 22)			(Football Association of Thailand) Police Tero
17	MF	Yotsakorn Natthasit	29 May 2004 (aged 21)			(Football Association of Thailand) Khonkaen United
18	FW	Iklas Sanron	16 December 2004 (aged 20)			(Football Association of Thailand) PT Prachuap
19	FW	Chawanwit Saelao	12 October 2004 (aged 21)			(Football Association of Thailand) Prime Bangkok
20	GK	Narongsak Naengwongsa	19 February 2004 (aged 21)			(Football Association of Thailand) Ayutthaya United
21	DF	Phon-Ek Jensen	30 March 2003 (aged 22)			(Football Association of Thailand) PT Prachuap
22	DF	Thawatchai Inprakhon	31 March 2003 (aged 22)			(Football Association of Thailand) Chiangrai United
23	GK	Chommaphat Boonloet	17 February 2003 (aged 22)			(Football Association of Thailand) Pattaya United

=== Singapore ===
Singapore announced their final squad on 29 November 2025.

Head coach: Firdaus Kassim

No.	Pos.	Player	Date of birth (age)	Caps	Goals	Club
1	GK	Aizil Yazid	24 December 2004 (aged 20)	11	0	(Football Association of Singapore) Young Lions
2	DF	Raoul Suhaimi	18 September 2005 (aged 20)	9	0	(Football Association of Singapore) Young Lions
3	DF	Luth Harith	19 March 2008 (aged 17)	3	0	(Football Association of Singapore) Young Lions
4	DF	Kieran Teo	6 April 2004 (aged 21)	10	0	(Football Association of Singapore) Young Lions
5	DF	Aqil Yazid	9 January 2004 (aged 21)	9	0	(Football Association of Singapore) Young Lions
6	MF	Ong Yu En	3 October 2003 (aged 22)	2	0	(Football Association of Singapore) Young Lions
7	FW	Khairin Nadim	8 May 2004 (aged 21)	9	1	(Portuguese Football Federation) Vizela
8	DF	Andrew Aw	29 March 2003 (aged 22)	8	0	(Football Association of Singapore) Young Lions
9	MF	Caelan Cheong	22 January 2006 (aged 19)	0	0	(Football Association of Singapore) Young Lions
10	FW	Amir Syafiz	21 June 2004 (aged 21)	4	0	(Football Association of Singapore) Young Lions
11	MF	Nur Muhammad Asis	4 April 2004 (aged 21)	7	0	(Portuguese Football Federation) Vizela
12	GK	Sunny Tia	25 February 2004 (aged 21)	11	0	(Football Association of Singapore) Young Lions
13	MF	Andy Reefqy	14 July 2008 (aged 17)	0	0	(Football Association of Singapore) Young Lions
14	FW	Nicolas Beninger	4 July 2006 (aged 19)	0	0	(Football Association of Singapore) Young Lions
15	MF	Ajay Robson	6 December 2006 (aged 18)	9	0	(Football Association of Singapore) Young Lions
16	DF	Aniq Raushan	5 October 2003 (aged 22)	0	0	(Football Association of Singapore) Young Lions
17	DF	Iryan Fandi	9 August 2006 (aged 19)	0	0	(Football Association of Singapore) Young Lions
18	FW	Nathan Mao	26 March 2008 (aged 17)	0	0	(Football Association of Singapore) Young Lions
19	MF	Rae Peh	15 September 2008 (aged 17)	3	0	(Football Association of Singapore) Young Lions
20	DF	Fairuz Fazli	20 January 2005 (aged 20)	3	0	(Football Association of Singapore) Young Lions
21	MF	Harith Danish	27 November 2008 (aged 17)	2	0	(Football Association of Singapore) Young Lions
22	FW	Jonan Tan	27 June 2006 (aged 19)	4	0	(Portuguese Football Federation) Vizela
23	GK	Ainun Nuha	11 March 2006 (aged 19)	0	0	(Football Association of Singapore) Young Lions

=== Timor-Leste ===
Timor-Leste announced their final squad on 3 December 2025.

Head coach: (Indonesia) Emral Abus

No.	Pos.	Player	Date of birth (age)	Caps	Goals	Club
1	GK	Egidio Luro	5 December 2008 (aged 16)	2	0	(East Timor Football Federation) Emmanuel
2	DF	Jackson Fowler	3 September 2004 (aged 21)	4	0	(Football Australia) Sydney Olympic
3	DF	Ricardo Bianco	15 January 2006 (aged 19)	6	1	(East Timor Football Federation) Ponta Leste
4	DF	Ryan Jom	3 March 2005 (aged 20)	0	0	(Football Australia) Rydalmere Lions
5	MF	Palomito Ribeiro	14 June 2005 (aged 20)	4	0	(East Timor Football Federation) Emmanuel
6	MF	Tristan Xavi	26 July 2008 (aged 17)	2	0	(Football Australia) Western Sydney Wanderers
7	FW	Luís Figo	17 April 2005 (aged 20)	7	2	(East Timor Football Federation) Ponta Leste
8	DF	Oatnasio Guterres	11 June 2006 (aged 19)	3	1	(Irish Football Association) Longhgall
9	FW	Olagar Xavier	18 May 2003 (aged 22)	0	0	(Philippine Football Federation) Aguilas–UMak
10	FW	Alexandro Bakhito	1 June 2006 (aged 19)	5	3	(East Timor Football Federation) SLB Laulara
11	MF	Zenivio	22 April 2005 (aged 20)	15	3	(Football Association of Singapore) Tanjong Pagar United
12	GK	Filonito Nogueira	16 November 2004 (aged 21)	2	0	(East Timor Football Federation) SLB Laulara
13	MF	Jonatas Pereira	24 June 2003 (aged 22)	1	0	(East Timor Football Federation) Emmanuel
14	DF	Aniso Monteiro	1 July 2003 (aged 22)	0	0	(East Timor Football Federation) Assalam
15	FW	Serafin Brito	unknown	2	0	(East Timor Football Federation) DIT
16	MF	Freteliano	9 August 2004 (aged 21)	8	1	(East Timor Football Federation) Emmanuel
17	DF	Mário Quintão	18 February 2004 (aged 21)	9	0	(East Timor Football Federation) Emmanuel
18	MF	Leonio Freitas	17 April 2007 (aged 18)	3	0	(East Timor Football Federation) Ponta Leste
19	FW	Vabio Canavaro	25 January 2007 (aged 18)	0	0	(East Timor Football Federation) Ponta Leste
21	FW	Gali Freitas	31 December 2004 (aged 20)	9	4	(Football Association of Indonesia) Persebaya Surabaya
22	FW	Paul Godinho	unknown	0	0	(East Timor Football Federation) Santa Cruz
23	DF	Anizo Correia	23 May 2003 (aged 22)	7	0	(East Timor Football Federation) Ponta Leste

== Group B ==
=== Vietnam ===
Vietnam announced their 28-men preliminary squad on 21 November 2025. The final squad was announced on 30 November.

Head coach: (South Korea) Kim Sang-sik

No.	Pos.	Player	Date of birth (age)	Caps	Goals	Club
1	GK	Trần Trung Kiên	9 February 2003 (aged 22)	9	0	(Vietnam Football Federation) Hoàng Anh Gia Lai
2	FW	Nguyễn Lê Phát	12 January 2007 (aged 18)	3	0	(Vietnam Football Federation) Ninh Bình
3	DF	Phạm Lý Đức	14 February 2003 (aged 22)	10	1	(Vietnam Football Federation) Công An Hà Nội
4	DF	Nguyễn Hiểu Minh	5 August 2004 (aged 21)	15	3	(Vietnam Football Federation) PVF-CAND
5	DF	Nguyễn Đức Anh	May 16, 2003 (aged 22)	10	0	(Vietnam Football Federation) SHB Đà Nẵng
6	MF	Nguyễn Thái Sơn	13 July 2003 (aged 22)	29	1	(Vietnam Football Federation) Đông Á Thanh Hóa
7	FW	Nguyễn Đình Bắc	19 August 2004 (aged 21)	20	3	(Vietnam Football Federation) Công An Hà Nội
8	MF	Nguyễn Thái Quốc Cường	6 March 2004 (aged 21)	7	0	(Vietnam Football Federation) Công An HCMC
9	FW	Nguyễn Quốc Việt	4 May 2003 (aged 22)	37	8	(Vietnam Football Federation) Ninh Bình
10	FW	Lê Văn Thuận	15 July 2006 (aged 19)	10	2	(Vietnam Football Federation) Đông Á Thanh Hóa
11	MF	Khuất Văn Khang (captain)	11 May 2003 (aged 22)	37	4	(Vietnam Football Federation) Thể Công-Viettel
12	MF	Nguyễn Xuân Bắc	3 February 2003 (aged 22)	13	1	(Vietnam Football Federation) PVF-CAND
13	GK	Nguyễn Tân	16 July 2005 (aged 20)	2	0	(Vietnam Football Federation) Công An HCMC
14	MF	Lê Viktor	10 November 2003 (aged 22)	13	2	(Vietnam Football Federation) Hồng Lĩnh Hà Tĩnh
15	DF	Đặng Tuấn Phong	7 February 2003 (aged 22)	8	0	(Vietnam Football Federation) Thể Công-Viettel
16	DF	Nguyễn Nhật Minh	27 July 2003 (aged 22)	15	0	(Vietnam Football Federation) Hải Phòng
17	MF	Nguyễn Phi Hoàng	27 March 2003 (aged 22)	19	0	(Vietnam Football Federation) SHB Đà Nẵng
18	MF	Nguyễn Công Phương	3 June 2006 (aged 19)	7	1	(Vietnam Football Federation) Thể Công-Viettel
19	MF	Nguyễn Ngọc Mỹ	20 February 2004 (aged 21)	7	1	(Vietnam Football Federation) Đông Á Thanh Hóa
20	DF	Võ Anh Quân	7 May 2004 (aged 21)	12	0	(Vietnam Football Federation) PVF-CAND
21	MF	Phạm Minh Phúc	7 February 2004 (aged 21)	8	1	(Vietnam Football Federation) Công An Hà Nội
22	FW	Nguyễn Thanh Nhàn	28 July 2003 (aged 22)	25	3	(Vietnam Football Federation) PVF-CAND
23	GK	Cao Văn Bình	8 January 2005 (aged 20)	10	0	(Vietnam Football Federation) Sông Lam Nghệ An

=== Malaysia ===
Malaysia announced their 25-men preliminary squad on 21 November 2025. The final squad was announced on 3 December.

Head coach: Nafuzi Zain

No.	Pos.	Player	Date of birth (age)	Club
1	GK	Syahmi Adib Haikal	30 March 2003 (aged 22)	(Football Association of Malaysia) Negeri Sembilan
2	DF	Aiman Hakimi	28 January 2005 (aged 20)	(Football Association of Malaysia) Selangor
3	DF	Ubaidullah Shamsul	30 November 2003 (aged 22)	(Football Association of Malaysia) Terengganu
4	DF	Alif Ahmad	2 January 2003 (aged 22)	(Football Association of Malaysia) Johor Darul Ta'zim
5	DF	Shafizan Arshad	15 August 2005 (aged 20)	(Football Association of Malaysia) Johor Darul Ta'zim
6	MF	Danish Hakimi	{6 January 2005 (aged 20)	(Football Association of Malaysia) Johor Darul Ta'zim
7	FW	Haqimi Azim	6 January 2003 (aged 22)	(Football Association of Malaysia) Kuala Lumpur City
8	MF	Muhammad Abu Khalil	11 April 2005 (aged 20)	(Football Association of Malaysia) Selangor
9	FW	Abdul Rahman Daud	4 December 2004 (aged 20)	(Football Association of Malaysia) Selangor
10	MF	Haykal Danish	5 May 2005 (aged 20)	(Football Association of Malaysia) Selangor
11	FW	Aliff Izwan	10 February 2004 (aged 21)	(Football Association of Malaysia) Selangor
12	MF	Ziad El Basheer	24 December 2003 (aged 21)	(Football Association of Malaysia) Johor Darul Ta'zim
13	DF	Aysar Hadi	4 September 2003 (aged 22)	(Football Association of Malaysia) Johor Darul Ta'zim
14	MF	Haziq Kutty Abba	28 September 2004 (aged 21)	(Football Association of Malaysia) Penang
15	FW	Fergus Tierney	19 March 2003 (aged 22)	(Football Association of Malaysia) Sabah
16	GK	Zulhilmi Sharani	{4 May 2004 (aged 21)	(Football Association of Malaysia) Johor Darul Ta'zim
17	FW	Rohisham Haiqal	24 October 2005 (aged 20)	(Football Association of Malaysia) Selangor
18	DF	Faris Danish	4 July 2006 (aged 19)	(Football Association of Malaysia) Johor Darul Ta'zim
19	DF	Aiman Yusuf	6 March 2006 (aged 19)	(Football Association of Malaysia) Selangor
20	DF	Zachary Zahidadil	27 May 2005 (aged 20)	(Football Association of Malaysia) Terengganu
21	DF	Ariff Safwan	17 February 2005 (aged 20)	(Football Association of Malaysia) Johor Darul Ta'zim
22	DF	Moses Raj	10 August 2005 (aged 20)	(Football Association of Malaysia) Selangor
23	GK	Haziq Mukriz	19 April 2003 (aged 22)	(Football Association of Malaysia) UM-Damansara United

=== Laos ===
Laos announced their final squad on 1 December 2025.

Head coach: (South Korea) Ha Hyeok-jun

No.	Pos.	Player	Date of birth (age)	Club
1	GK	Kop Lokphathip	8 May 2006 (aged 19)	(Lao Football Federation) Ezra
2	DF	Phoutthavong Sangvilay	16 October 2004 (aged 21)	(Football Association of Thailand) BG Pathum United
3	MF	Sonevilay Phetviengsy	27 May 2004 (aged 21)	(Lao Football Federation) Master
4	MF	Sayfon Keohanam	11 July 2006 (aged 19)	(Football Association of Thailand) Suphanburi
5	DF	Phetdavanh Somsanith	24 April 2004 (aged 21)	(Lao Football Federation) Master
6	MF	Chanthavixay Khounthoumphone	17 February 2004 (aged 21)	(Lao Football Federation) Ezra
7	MF	Khonesavanh Keonuchanh	4 June 2004 (aged 21)	(Lao Football Federation) Mazda Laos GB
8	MF	Binly Donsanouphit	30 June 2008 (aged 17)	(Lao Football Federation) Ezra
9	FW	Souksavanh Hopchakkavan	8 September 2006 (aged 19)	(Lao Football Federation) Namtha United
10	FW	Peter Phanthavong	15 February 2006 (aged 19)	(Lao Football Federation) Ezra
11	FW	Somvang Choummaly	2 April 2006 (aged 19)	(Lao Football Federation) Mazda Laos GB
12	GK	Xaysomphong Thipphavong	2009 (aged 15–16)	(Lao Football Federation) Mazda Laos GB
13	DF	Xayasouk Keovisone	21 July 2006 (aged 19)	(Lao Football Federation) Ezra
14	DF	Phetvixay Phimmasen	8 January 2005 (aged 20)	(Lao Football Federation) Ezra
15	MF	Damoth Thongkhamsavath	3 April 2004 (aged 21)	(Vietnam Football Federation) Đông Á Thanh Hóa
16	DF	Saleumxay Phommavong	7 August 2003 (aged 22)	(Lao Football Federation) Ezra
17	FW	Khampane Douangvilay	5 February 2004 (aged 21)	(Lao Football Federation) Master
18	GK	Soulisak Souvankham	10 September 2007 (aged 18)	(Lao Football Federation) Chanthabouly
19	MF	Bounphaeng Xaysombath	5 February 2005 (aged 20)	(Lao Football Federation) Luang Prabang
20	DF	Okham Latsachack	22 July 2007 (aged 18)	(Lao Football Federation) Lao Army
21	DF	Vongsakda Chanthaleuxay	28 November 2004 (aged 21)	(Lao Football Federation) Mazda Laos GB
22	DF	Oun Phetvongsa	29 September 2003 (aged 22)	(Lao Football Federation) Namtha United
23	FW	Thanousack Nanthavongdouangsy	21 August 2006 (aged 19)	(Lao Football Federation) Ezra

== Group C ==
=== Indonesia ===
Indonesia announced their final squad on 27 November 2025. On 3 December 2025, Marselino Ferdinan withdrew due to an injury and replaced by Rifqi Ray.

Head coach: Indra Sjafri

No.	Pos.	Player	Date of birth (age)	Caps	Goals	Club
1	GK	Cahya Supriadi	11 February 2003 (aged 22)	6	0	(Football Association of Indonesia) PSIM Yogyakarta
2	DF	Muhammad Ferarri	21 June 2003 (aged 22)	23	2	(Football Association of Indonesia) Bhayangkara Presisi Lampung
3	DF	Kakang Rudianto	22 August 2003 (aged 22)	10	0	(Football Association of Indonesia) Persib Bandung
4	DF	Kadek Arel	4 April 2005 (aged 20)	18	0	(Football Association of Indonesia) Bali United
5	MF	Ivar Jenner (captain)	10 January 2004 (aged 21)	12	2	(Royal Dutch Football Association) Utrecht
6	DF	Robi Darwis	2 August 2003 (aged 22)	17	0	(Football Association of Indonesia) Persib Bandung
7	MF	Zanadin Fariz	31 May 2004 (aged 21)	4	1	(Football Association of Indonesia) Persis Solo
8	MF	Rayhan Hannan	2 April 2004 (aged 21)	13	2	(Football Association of Indonesia) Persija Jakarta
9	FW	Mauro Zijlstra	9 November 2004 (aged 21)	2	1	(Royal Dutch Football Association) Volendam
10	FW	Rafael Struick	27 March 2003 (aged 22)	15	5	(Football Association of Indonesia) Dewa United Banten
11	FW	Hokky Caraka	21 August 2004 (aged 21)	15	1	(Football Association of Indonesia) Persita Tangerang
12	MF	Ananda Raehan	17 December 2003 (aged 21)	14	0	(Football Association of Indonesia) PSM Makassar
13	MF	Rifqi Ray	22 June 2004 (aged 21)	1	0	(Football Association of Indonesia) Persik Kediri
14	MF	Rivaldo Pakpahan	20 January 2003 (aged 22)	4	0	(Football Association of Indonesia) Borneo Samarinda
15	DF	Raka Cahyana	24 February 2004 (aged 21)	4	0	(Football Association of Indonesia) PSIM Yogyakarta
16	DF	Dony Tri Pamungkas	11 January 2005 (aged 20)	17	2	(Football Association of Indonesia) Persija Jakarta
17	FW	Rahmat Arjuna	30 April 2004 (aged 21)	10	0	(Football Association of Indonesia) Bali United
18	MF	Toni Firmansyah	14 January 2005 (aged 20)	9	0	(Football Association of Indonesia) Persebaya Surabaya
19	DF	Dion Markx	29 June 2005 (aged 20)	4	0	(Royal Dutch Football Association) TOP Oss
20	DF	Frengky Missa	20 February 2004 (aged 21)	14	0	(Football Association of Indonesia) Bhayangkara Presisi Lampung
21	FW	Jens Raven	12 October 2005 (aged 20)	11	7	(Football Association of Indonesia) Bali United
22	GK	Daffa Fasya	7 May 2004 (aged 21)	2	0	(Football Association of Indonesia) Borneo Samarinda
23	GK	Muhammad Ardiansyah	23 March 2003 (aged 22)	5	0	(Football Association of Indonesia) PSM Makassar

=== Myanmar ===
Myanmar announced their final squad on 27 November 2025.

Head coach: (Japan) Hisashi Kurosaki

No.	Pos.	Player	Date of birth (age)	Caps	Goals	Club
1	GK	Aung Pyae Phyo	21 June 2003 (aged 22)	2	0	(Myanmar Football Federation) Dagon Star United
2	MF	Htoo Wai Yan		9	0	(Myanmar Football Federation) Mahar United
3	DF	Sa Khant Chaw	15 July 2005 (aged 20)	9	0	(Myanmar Football Federation) Dagon Star United
4	DF	Myat Phone Khant		9	0	(Myanmar Football Federation) Thitsar Arman
5	MF	Arkar Kyaw	7 February 2003 (aged 22)	16	0	(Myanmar Football Federation) Yangon United
6	FW	Shine Wanna Aung	15 March 2006 (aged 19)	9	3	(Myanmar Football Federation) Thitsar Arman
7	MF	Moe Swe	31 May 2003 (aged 22)	12	1	(Myanmar Football Federation) Dagon Star United
8	MF	Aung Thiha	6 July 2004 (aged 21)	0	0	(Myanmar Football Federation) Dagon Star United
9	FW	Than Toe Aung	15 July 2003 (aged 22)	12	1	(Myanmar Football Federation) Hantharwaddy United
10	MF	Zaw Win Thein	1 March 2003 (aged 22)	22	0	(Myanmar Football Federation) Yangon United
11	FW	Saw Myo Zaw		5	0	(Myanmar Football Federation) Thitsar Arman
12	GK	Khant Min Thant	20 June 2004 (aged 21)	3	0	(Myanmar Football Federation) Thitsar Arman
13	DF	Phyo Pyae Sone	28 June 2006 (aged 19)	0	0	(Myanmar Football Federation) Yadanarbon
14	DF	Latt Wai Phone	4 May 2005 (aged 20)	6	0	(Myanmar Football Federation) Yangon United
15	DF	Kaung Htet Paing	27 May 2004 (aged 21)	7	1	(Myanmar Football Federation) Yangon United
16	DF	Samuel Ngai Kee	20 October 2005 (aged 20)	1	0	(Myanmar Football Federation) Yadanarbon
17	MF	Ye Yint Phyo	26 July 2003 (aged 22)	10	0	(Myanmar Football Federation) Ayeyawady United
18	FW	Swan Htet	12 April 2005 (aged 20)	13	3	(Myanmar Football Federation) Dagon Star United
19	MF	Thurain Tun	22 August 2005 (aged 20)	0	0	(Portuguese Football Federation) Esperança de Lagos
20	DF	Mar Ti No		5	0	(Myanmar Football Federation) ISPE
21	FW	Oakkar Naing	18 November 2003 (aged 22)	9	0	(Myanmar Football Federation) Yangon United
22	FW	Min Maw Oo	6 March 2005 (aged 20)	12	1	(Myanmar Football Federation) Thitsar Arman
23	GK	Hein Htet Soe	21 June 2003 (aged 22)	8	0	(Myanmar Football Federation) Ayeyawady United

=== Philippines ===
Philippines announced their final squad on 4 December 2025.

Head coach: (Australia) Garreth McPherson

No.	Pos.	Player	Date of birth (age)	Caps	Goals	Club
1	GK	Nicholas Guimarães	9 August 2006 (aged 19)	8	0	(Japan Football Association) Juntendo University
2	DF	Noah Leddel	30 August 2003 (aged 22)	10	1	(Philippine Football Federation) Dynamic Herb Cebu
3	DF	Gabriel Guimarães	9 August 2006 (aged 19)	1	0	(Japan Football Association) Ichikawa SC
4	DF	Isaiah Alakiu	7 October 2007 (aged 17)	3	0	(The Football Association) Brighton & Hove Albion
5	DF	Joshua Meriño	11 February 2005 (aged 20)	8	0	(Philippine Football Federation) University of the Philippines
6	MF	Sandro Reyes	29 March 2003 (aged 22)	12	3	(German Football Association) FC Gütersloh
7	FW	Dylan Demuynck	6 May 2004 (aged 21)	0	0	(Royal Belgian Football Association) Lierse
8	MF	Gavin Muens	24 October 2004 (aged 20)	14	1	(Philippine Football Federation) Kaya–Iloilo
9	FW	Andres Aldeguer	18 December 2003 (aged 21)	9	0	(Philippine Football Federation) One Taguig
10	MF	Javier Mariona	17 October 2004 (aged 20)	8	3	(United States Soccer Federation) AV Alta
11	FW	Dov Cariño	18 December 2003 (aged 21)	14	2	(Philippine Football Federation) Ateneo de Manila University
12	GK	Alfonso Gonzalez	5 January 2005 (aged 20)	0	0	(Philippine Football Federation) University of the Philippines
13	FW	Alex Monis	20 March 2003 (aged 22)	3	0	(United States Soccer Federation) New England Revolution
14	DF	Jaime Rosquillo	10 March 2003 (aged 22)	16	0	(Philippine Football Federation) Dynamic Herb Cebu
15	DF	Nico McMillan	7 April 2003 (aged 22)	0	0	(Philippine Football Federation) Stallion Laguna
16	MF	Jared Peña	8 May 2006 (aged 19)	13	0	(United States Soccer Federation) Walsh University
17	FW	Otu Banatao	11 November 2006 (aged 18)	8	4	(United States Soccer Federation) Old Dominion University
18	GK	Iñigo Castro	2 July 2006 (aged 19)	0	0	(Philippine Football Federation) De La Salle University
19	FW	Selwyn Mamon	7 July 2004 (aged 21)	5	1	(Philippine Football Federation) Far Eastern University
20	DF	Antoine Ortega	12 May 2003 (aged 22)	6	0	(Cyprus Football Association) Omonia Aradippou
21	DF	Santiago Rublico	18 August 2005 (aged 20)	5	0	(Royal Spanish Football Federation) Alcorcón
22	MF	John Lucero	1 December 2003 (aged 21)	16	0	(Football Association of Thailand) Kanchanaburi Power
23	MF	Stavros Charalampous	23 February 2003 (aged 22)	0	0	(United States Soccer Federation) California Baptist University
