= Football at the 2025 SEA Games – Men's tournament final =

2025 SEA Games men's football final
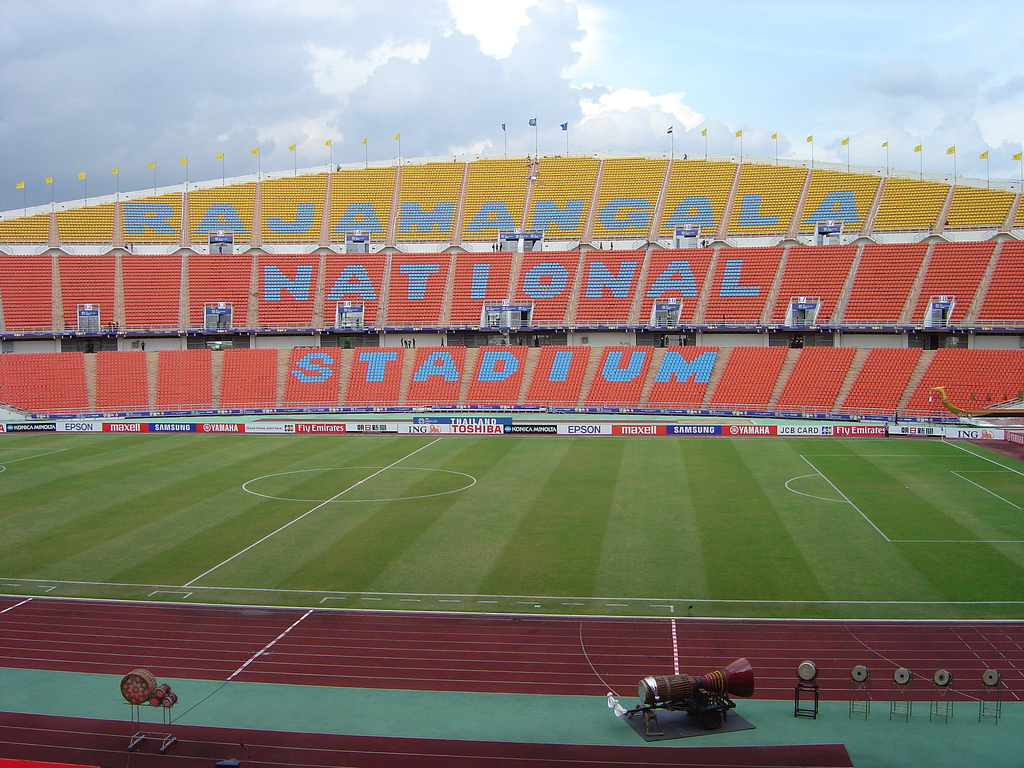
- Rajamangala Stadium in Bangkok hosted the final
- Event: Football at the 2025 SEA Games – Men's tournament
Thailand	Vietnam
(Thailand)	(Vietnam)
2	3
- After extra time
- Date: 18 December 2025
- Venue: Rajamangala Stadium, Bangkok
- Referee: Mooud Bonyadifard (Iran)
- Attendance: 17,736
- Weather: Partly cloudy 29 °C (84 °F); 66% humidity

The 2025 SEA Games football gold medal match (Thai: การแข่งขันฟุตบอลชิงเหรียญทองซีเกมส์ 2568) was a football match to determine the gold medal winners of men's football tournament at the 2025 SEA Games. The match was the 33rd final of the men's football tournament at the Southeast Asian Games (SEA Games), a biennial tournament contested by the men's under-22 national teams of the member associations of the ASEAN Football Federation (AFF) to decide the SEA Games men's football champions. The match was held at Rajamangala Stadium in Bangkok, Thailand, on 18 December 2025.

The final was contested between hosts Thailand and rivals Vietnam. Both teams were seeking their seventeenth and fourth SEA Games title, respectively. Earlier in the year, at senior level, Vietnam defeated Thailand in the 2024 ASEAN Championship final held at Rajamangala Stadium.

Vietnam won the match 3–2 after extra time, winning their third (fourth overall) ever gold medal in the SEA Games men's football event.

== Venue ==
The final was held at Rajamangala Stadium in Bangkok.

The stadium first opened in 1998, and had been refurbished thrice since 2019 and 2025. The stadium first hosted the 1998 Asian Games, and then a year later for the 1999 ASEAN University Games. The stadium also hosted some matches for the 2007 AFC Asian Cup. In January 2020, the stadium hosted the 2020 AFC U-23 Championship as one of the four stadiums hosting this tournament. 3 years later, the stadium hosted group stage matches for the 2023 AFC U-17 Asian Cup.

== Route to the final ==
Thailand
Round
Vietnam
Opponent
Result
Group stage
Opponent
Result
Timor-Leste
6–1
Match 1
Laos
2–1
Singapore
3–0
Match 2
Malaysia
2–0
Group A winner

Pos	Team	Pld	Pts
1	Thailand (H)	2	6
2	Timor-Leste	2	3
3	Singapore	2	0

Source: Soccerway
(H) Hosts

Advance to knockout stage

Final standings
Group B winners

Pos	Team	Pld	Pts
1	Vietnam	2	6
2	Malaysia	2	3
3	Laos	2	0

Source: Soccerway

Advance to knockout stage

Opponent
Result
Knockout stage
Opponent
Result
Malaysia
1–0
Semi-finals
Philippines
2–0

== Match details ==
18 December 2025
19:30

Thailand	2–3 (a.e.t.)	Vietnam
Yotsakorn B. 20'; Seksan 31'	Report	Nguyễn Đình Bắc 49' (pen.); Waris 60' (o.g.); Nguyễn Thanh Nhàn 96'

Rajamangala Stadium, Bangkok
Attendance: 17,736
Referee: Mooud Bonyadifard (Iran)

Thailand	Vietnam

GK	1	Sorawat Phosaman	(yellow card) 48'
CB	2	Chanon Tamma
CB	4	Chanapach Buaphan		(substituted off) 29'
CB	21	Phon-Ek Jensen	(yellow card) 120+3'
DM	6	Sittha Boonlha		(substituted off) 80'
RM	12	Waris Choolthong
CM	7	Kakana Khamyok		(substituted off) 80'
CM	5	Seksan Ratree (c)		(substituted off) 80'
LM	15	Chaiyaphon Otton	(yellow card) 54'	(substituted off) 106'
SS	18	Iklas Sanron		(substituted off) 70'
CF	9	Yotsakorn Burapha
Substitutes:
DF	16	Pichitchai Sienkrathok		(substituted on) 29'
FW	19	Chawanwit Saelao		(substituted on) 70'
MF	17	Yotsakorn Natthasit		(substituted on) 80'
FW	11	Siraphop Wandee		(substituted on) 80'
MF	10	Thanakrit Chotmuangpak		(substituted on) 80'
FW	8	Thanawut Phochai		(substituted on) 106'
Manager:
Thawatchai Damrong-Ongtrakul

GK	1	Trần Trung Kiên
CB	3	Phạm Lý Đức
CB	4	Nguyễn Hiểu Minh
CB	16	Nguyễn Nhật Minh
RM	21	Phạm Minh Phúc		(substituted off) 106'
CM	8	Nguyễn Thái Quốc Cường		(substituted off) 38'
CM	12	Nguyễn Xuân Bắc
LM	17	Nguyễn Phi Hoàng	(yellow card) 88'
AM	14	Lê Viktor		(substituted off) 46'
AM	11	Khuất Văn Khang (c)	(yellow card) 45'	(substituted off) 46'
CF	7	Nguyễn Đình Bắc		(substituted off) 111'
Substitutes:
MF	6	Nguyễn Thái Sơn		(substituted on) 38'
FW	22	Nguyễn Thanh Nhàn	(yellow card) 97'	(substituted on) 46'	(substituted off) 100'
MF	10	Lê Văn Thuận	(yellow card) 120'	(substituted on) 46'
FW	9	Nguyễn Quốc Việt		(substituted on) 100'
DF	20	Võ Anh Quân		(substituted on) 107'
FW	19	Nguyễn Ngọc Mỹ		(substituted on) 111'
Manager:
(South Korea) Kim Sang-sik

Assistant referees:
Alireza Ildorom (Iran)
Bang Gi-yeol (South Korea)
Fourth official:
Choi Hyun-jai (South Korea)

Match rules

- 90 minutes
- 30 minutes of extra time if necessary
- Penalty shoot-out if scores still level
- Maximum of seven named substitutes
- Maximum of five substitutions, with a sixth allowed in extra time
- Maximum of three substitution opportunities, with a fourth allowed in extra time

== See also ==
- Football at the 2025 SEA Games – Women's tournament final
- Thailand–Vietnam football rivalry
