= Football at the 2025 SEA Games – Men's tournament – Knockout stage =

The knockout stage of the men's football tournament at the 2025 SEA Games were played from 15 to 18 December 2025. The group winner and the best runner-up from each group in the group stage qualify for the knockout stage.

== Format ==
In the knockout stage, if a match was level at the end of 90 minutes of normal playing time, extra time was played (two periods of 15 minutes each) and followed, if necessary, by a penalty shoot-out to determine the winner.

== Qualified teams ==
The group winner and the best runner-up from each of the three groups qualified for the knockout stage.

Group	Winners	Runners-up (Best one qualify)
A	Thailand	—N/a
B	Vietnam	Malaysia
C	Philippines	—N/a

== Bracket ==
Semi-finals
15 December – Bangkok
Thailand	1
Malaysia	0
15 December – Bangkok
Vietnam	2
Philippines	0

Gold medal match
18 December – Bangkok
Thailand	2
Vietnam (a.e.t.)	3
Bronze medal match
18 December – Bangkok
Philippines	1
Malaysia	2

== Semi-finals ==
=== Vietnam vs Philippines ===
15 December 2025
15:30

Vietnam	2–0	Philippines
Lê Văn Thuận 89'; Nguyễn Thanh Nhàn 90+2'	Report

Rajamangala Stadium, Bangkok
Referee: Choi Hyun-jai (South Korea)

Vietnam	Philippines

Manager: (South Korea) Kim Sang-sik	Manager: (Australia) Garrath McPherson

Assistant referees:
Bang Gi-yeol (South Korea)
Alireza Ildrom (Iran)
Fourth official:
Mooud Bonyadifard (Iran)

=== Thailand vs Malaysia ===
15 December 2025
20:00

Thailand	1–0	Malaysia
Yotsakorn B. 8'	Report

Rajamangala Stadium, Bangkok
Attendance: 19,659
Referee: Rustam Lutfullin (Uzbekistan)

Thailand	Malaysia

Manager: Thawatchai Damrong-Ongtrakul	Manager: Nafuzi Zain

Assistant referees:
Sanjar Shayusupov (Uzbekistan)
Hasan Karimov (Tajikistan)
Fourth official:
Sadullo Gulmurodi (Tajikistan)

== Bronze medal match ==
18 December 2025
15:30

Philippines	1–2	Malaysia
Haqimi 36' (o.g.)	Report	Danish 28'; Haqimi 43'

Rajamangala Stadium, Bangkok
Attendance: 1,325
Referee: Qasim Al-Hatmi (Oman)

Philippines	Malaysia

Manager: (Australia) Garreth McPherson	Manager: Nafuzi Zain

Assistant referees:
Hamed Talib Saif Al-Ghafri (Oman)
Mohamed Jaafar Mohamed Salman (Bahrain)
Fourth official:
Rustam Lutfullin (Uzbekistan)

== Gold medal match ==
18 December 2025
19:30

Thailand	2–3 (a.e.t.)	Vietnam
Yotsakorn B. 20'; Seksan 31'	Report	Nguyễn Đình Bắc 49' (pen.); Waris 60' (o.g.); Nguyễn Thanh Nhàn 96'

Rajamangala Stadium, Bangkok
Attendance: 17,736
Referee: Mooud Bonyadifard (Iran)

Thailand	Vietnam

GK	1	Sorawat Phosaman	(yellow card) 48'
CB	2	Chanon Tamma
CB	4	Chanapach Buaphan		(substituted off) 29'
CB	21	Phon-Ek Jensen	(yellow card) 120+3'
DM	6	Sittha Boonlha		(substituted off) 80'
RM	12	Waris Choolthong
CM	7	Kakana Khamyok		(substituted off) 80'
CM	5	Seksan Ratree (c)		(substituted off) 80'
LM	15	Chaiyaphon Otton	(yellow card) 54'	(substituted off) 106'
SS	18	Iklas Sanron		(substituted off) 70'
CF	9	Yotsakorn Burapha
Substitutes:
DF	16	Pichitchai Sienkrathok		(substituted on) 29'
FW	19	Chawanwit Saelao		(substituted on) 70'
MF	17	Yotsakorn Natthasit		(substituted on) 80'
FW	11	Siraphop Wandee		(substituted on) 80'
MF	10	Thanakrit Chotmuangpak		(substituted on) 80'
FW	8	Thanawut Phochai		(substituted on) 106'
Manager:
Thawatchai Damrong-Ongtrakul

GK	1	Trần Trung Kiên
CB	3	Phạm Lý Đức
CB	4	Nguyễn Hiểu Minh
CB	16	Nguyễn Nhật Minh
RM	21	Phạm Minh Phúc		(substituted off) 106'
CM	8	Nguyễn Thái Quốc Cường		(substituted off) 38'
CM	12	Nguyễn Xuân Bắc
LM	17	Nguyễn Phi Hoàng	(yellow card) 88'
AM	14	Lê Viktor		(substituted off) 46'
AM	11	Khuất Văn Khang (c)	(yellow card) 45'	(substituted off) 46'
CF	7	Nguyễn Đình Bắc		(substituted off) 111'
Substitutes:
MF	6	Nguyễn Thái Sơn		(substituted on) 38'
FW	22	Nguyễn Thanh Nhàn	(yellow card) 97'	(substituted on) 46'	(substituted off) 100'
MF	10	Lê Văn Thuận	(yellow card) 120'	(substituted on) 46'
FW	9	Nguyễn Quốc Việt		(substituted on) 100'
DF	20	Võ Anh Quân		(substituted on) 107'
FW	19	Nguyễn Ngọc Mỹ		(substituted on) 111'
Manager:
(South Korea) Kim Sang-sik

Assistant referees:
Alireza Ildorom (Iran)
Bang Gi-yeol (South Korea)
Fourth official:
Choi Hyun-jai (South Korea)
