= Football at the 2025 SEA Games =

Sports tournament in Thailand

Event details
- Games: 2025 SEA Games
- Host country: Thailand
- Dates: 3–18 December
- Venues: 4 (in 3 host cities)
- Competitors: 368 from 9 nations

Men's tournament
- Teams: 9 (from 1 sub-confederation)
Medalists
Gold	Vietnam
Silver	Thailand
Bronze	Malaysia

Women's tournament
- Teams: 7 (from 1 sub-confederation)
Medalists
Gold	Philippines
Silver	Vietnam
Bronze	Thailand

Editions
- ← 2023 2027 →

The football tournament at the 2025 SEA Games were held from 3 to 18 December in Thailand. The men's matches were held in Bangkok and Chiang Mai city, while the women's matches was held in Chonburi. The draw took place in Bangkok on 19 October 2025.

Associations affiliated with the ASEAN Football Federation (AFF) might send teams to participate in the tournament. There were no age restrictions on women's teams. For men's teams, the age limit were under-22 (born on or after 1 January 2003) with no overage players being allowed like the 2023 tournament.

Vietnam were the four-time women's defending champions, but got defeated by the Philippines in the gold medal match. Indonesia were the men's defending champions but did not get past in the group stage. For Thailand, this is the fourth conclusive times that neither men's nor women's teams failed to achieved gold medal, the first time since 1967 the men's team failed to achieve gold medal on their home soil, and the first time ever the women's team failed to achieve gold medal on their home soil.

== Competition schedule ==
The competition schedule was announced on 3 November 2025. The final match schedule was confirmed by the AFF on 2 December 2025.

GS	Group stage	½	Semi-finals	B	Bronze medal match	F	Gold medal match

Date Event	Wed 3	Thu 4	Fri 5	Sat 6	Sun 7	Mon 8	Tue 9	Wed 10	Thu 11	Fri 12	Sat 13	Sun 14	Mon 15	Tue 16	Wed 17		Thu 18	
Men	GS		GS	GS		GS			GS	GS			½				B	F
Women		GS	GS		GS	GS		GS	GS			½			B	F		

== Venues ==
A total of 4 venues in Thailand was used to host the football matches. Chiang Mai (the 1995 main venue) will host the men's group C match, Bangkok (the first time in Rajamangala Stadium, which before hosted in Supachalasai Stadium) will host the group A and B and knockout stages, while Chonburi will host the women's tournament. Notably, no matches will be played in Nakhon Ratchasima (venue of 2007), due to the city will host the Para Games the next year.

Originally, Tinsulanon Stadium in Songkhla was scheduled to hosted the Group B of men's tournament, but due to the floods caused by Cyclone Senyar, all group B matches have to move to Rajamangala Stadium in Bangkok as replacement.

Men's tournament		Location of the host cities of the football at the 2025 SEA Games.
Group A and B matches and Knockout Stage	Group C matches	Location of the host cities of the football at the 2025 SEA Games.
Bangkok	Chiang Mai	Location of the host cities of the football at the 2025 SEA Games.
Rajamangala Stadium	700th Anniversary Stadium	Location of the host cities of the football at the 2025 SEA Games.
Capacity: 51,560	Capacity: 17,909	Location of the host cities of the football at the 2025 SEA Games.
Women's tournament		Location of the host cities of the football at the 2025 SEA Games.
Group Stage and Knockout Stage		Location of the host cities of the football at the 2025 SEA Games.
Chonburi		Location of the host cities of the football at the 2025 SEA Games.
IPE Chonburi Stadium	Chonburi Stadium	Location of the host cities of the football at the 2025 SEA Games.
Capacity: 11,000	Capacity: 8,680	Location of the host cities of the football at the 2025 SEA Games.

== Participating nations ==
Nation	Men's	Women's	Athletes
Brunei	No	No	0
Cambodia	No	No	0
Indonesia	Yes	Yes	46
Laos	Yes	No	23
Malaysia	Yes	Yes	46
Myanmar	Yes	Yes	46
Philippines	Yes	Yes	46
Singapore	Yes	Yes	46
Thailand	Yes	Yes	46
Timor-Leste	Yes	No	23
Vietnam	Yes	Yes	46
Total: 9 NOCs	9/11	7/11	368/368

== Men's tournament ==
=== Group stage ===
==== Group A ====
Pos	Team	Pld	W	D	L	GF	GA	GD	Pts	Qualification
1	Thailand (H)	2	2	0	0	9	1	+8	6	Advance to knockout stage
2	Timor-Leste	2	1	0	1	4	7	−3	3	
3	Singapore	2	0	0	2	1	6	−5	0	

Source: Soccerway
Rules for classification: Group stage tiebreakers
(H) Hosts

==== Group B ====
Pos	Team	Pld	W	D	L	GF	GA	GD	Pts	Qualification
1	Vietnam	2	2	0	0	4	1	+3	6	Advance to knockout stage
2	Malaysia	2	1	0	1	4	3	+1	3	Advance to knockout stage
3	Laos	2	0	0	2	2	6	−4	0	

Source: Soccerway
Rules for classification: Group stage tiebreakers

==== Group C ====
Pos	Team	Pld	W	D	L	GF	GA	GD	Pts	Qualification
1	Philippines	2	2	0	0	3	0	+3	6	Advance to knockout stage
2	Indonesia	2	1	0	1	3	2	+1	3	
3	Myanmar	2	0	0	2	1	5	−4	0	

Source: Soccerway
Rules for classification: Group stage tiebreakers

==== Ranking of second-placed teams ====
Pos	Grp	Team	Pld	W	D	L	GF	GA	GD	Pts	Qualification
1	B	Malaysia	2	1	0	1	4	3	+1	3	Advance to knockout stage
2	C	Indonesia	2	1	0	1	3	2	+1	3	
3	A	Timor-Leste	2	1	0	1	4	7	−3	3	

Source: Soccerway
Rules for classification: 1) Points; 2) Goal difference; 3) Goals scored; 4) Wins; 5) Lower disciplinary points total; 6) Drawing of lots.

=== Knockout stage ===
Semi-finals
15 December – Bangkok
Thailand	1
Malaysia	0
15 December – Bangkok
Vietnam	2
Philippines	0

Gold medal match
18 December – Bangkok
Thailand	2
Vietnam (a.e.t.)	3
Bronze medal match
18 December – Bangkok
Philippines	1
Malaysia	2

== Women's tournament ==
=== Group stage ===
==== Group A ====
Pos	Team	Pld	W	D	L	GF	GA	GD	Pts	Qualification
1	Thailand (H)	2	2	0	0	10	0	+10	6	Advance to knockout stage
2	Indonesia	2	1	0	1	3	9	−6	3	Advance to knockout stage
3	Singapore	2	0	0	2	1	5	−4	0	
4	Cambodia	0	0	0	0	0	0	0	0	Withdrew

Source: Soccerway
(H) Hosts

==== Group B ====
Pos	Team	Pld	W	D	L	GF	GA	GD	Pts	Qualification
1	Vietnam	3	2	0	1	9	1	+8	6	Advance to knockout stage
2	Philippines	3	2	0	1	8	2	+6	6	Advance to knockout stage
3	Myanmar	3	2	0	1	5	3	+2	6	
4	Malaysia	3	0	0	3	0	16	−16	0	

Source: Soccerway

=== Knockout stage ===
Semi-finals
14 December – Chonburi
Thailand	1 (2)
Philippines (p)	1 (4)
14 December – Chonburi
Vietnam	5
Indonesia	0

Gold medal match
17 December – Chonburi
Philippines (p)	0 (6)
Vietnam	0 (5)
Bronze medal match
17 December – Chonburi
Thailand	2
Indonesia	0

== Medal summary ==
=== Medal table ===
* Host nation (Thailand)

Rank	Nation	Gold	Silver	Bronze	Total
1	Vietnam (VIE)	1	1	0	2
2	Philippines (PHI)	1	0	0	1
3	Thailand (THA)*	0	1	1	2
4	Malaysia (MAS)	0	0	1	1
Totals (4 entries)		2	2	2	6

=== Medalists ===
Event	Gold	Silver	Bronze
Men's tournament	Vietnam	Thailand	Malaysia
Women's tournament	Philippines	Vietnam	Thailand
