= Football at the 2025 SEA Games – Men's tournament – Group B =

Group B of the men's football tournament at the 2025 SEA Games was played from 3 to 11 December 2025. The group consisted of Vietnam, Malaysia, and Laos.

== Teams ==
Draw position	Team	SEA Games appearance	Last appearance	Previous best performance
B1	Vietnam	24th	2023	Gold medalists (1959 (Note: As South Vietnam), 2019, 2021)
B2	Malaysia	33rd	2023	Gold medalists (1961 (Note: As Malaya), 1977, 1979, 1989, 2009, 2011)
B3	Laos	22nd	2023	Bronze medalist (1969)

== Standings ==
Pos	Team	Pld	W	D	L	GF	GA	GD	Pts	Qualification
1	Vietnam	2	2	0	0	4	1	+3	6	Advance to knockout stage
2	Malaysia	2	1	0	1	4	3	+1	3	Advance to knockout stage
3	Laos	2	0	0	2	2	6	−4	0	

Source: Soccerway
Rules for classification: Group stage tiebreakers

== Matches ==
=== Laos vs Vietnam ===
3 December 2025
16:00

Laos	1–2	Vietnam
Khampane 33'	Report	Nguyễn Đình Bắc 28', 60'

Rajamangala Stadium, Bangkok (Note: Originally planned to be held in Tinsulanon Stadium, but moved to Rajamangala Stadium due to Cyclone Senyar hitting Songkhla province.)
Referee: Rustam Lutfullin (Uzbekistan)

Laos	Vietnam

Manager: (South Korea) Ha Hyeok-jun	Manager: (South Korea) Kim Sang-sik

Assistant referees:
Sanjar Shayusupov (Uzbekistan)
Hamed Al-Ghafri (Oman)
Fourth official:
Qasim Al-Hatmi (Oman)

=== Malaysia vs Laos ===
6 December 2025
16:00

Malaysia	4–1	Laos
Haykal 33'; Haqimi 59'; Moses 62'; Muhammad 90'	Report	Bounphaeng 4'

Rajamangala Stadium, Bangkok
Referee: Payam Heydari (Iran)

Malaysia	Laos

Manager: Nafuzi Zain	Manager: (South Korea) Ha Hyeok-jun

Assistant referees:
Farhad Farhadpoor (Iran)
Sanjar Shayusupov (Uzbekistan)
Fourth official:
Rustam Lutfullin (Uzbekistan)

=== Vietnam vs Malaysia ===
11 December 2025
16:00

Vietnam	2–0	Malaysia
Nguyễn Hiểu Minh 11'; Phạm Minh Phúc 22'	Report

Rajamangala Stadium, Bangkok
Referee: Qasim Al-Hatmi (Oman)

Vietnam	Malaysia

Manager: (South Korea) Kim Sang-sik	Manager: Nafuzi Zain

Assistant referees:
Hamed Talib Saif Al-Ghafri (Oman)
Farhad Farhadpoor (Iran)
Fourth official:
Payam Heidari (Iran)
