= Football at the 2025 SEA Games – Men's tournament – Group C =

Group C of the men's football tournament at the 2025 SEA Games was played from 5 to 12 December 2025. The group consisted of Indonesia, Myanmar, and the Philippines. Originally, Singapore were drawn in this group, but due to Cambodia's withdrawal, their draw was revised and Singapore were moved to Group A.

== Teams ==
| Draw position | Team | SEA Games appearance | Last appearance | Previous best performance |
|---|---|---|---|---|
| C1 | Indonesia | 25th | 2023 | Gold medalists (1987, 1991, 2023) |
| C2 | Myanmar | 32nd | 2023 | Gold medalists (1965, 1967, 1969, 1989, 1973) |
| C3 | Philippines | 17th | 2023 | Semi-finalists (1991) |

== Standings ==
| Pos | Team | Pld | W | D | L | GF | GA | GD | Pts | Qualification |
|---|---|---|---|---|---|---|---|---|---|---|
| 1 | Philippines | 2 | 2 | 0 | 0 | 3 | 0 | +3 | 6 | Advance to knockout stage |
| 2 | Indonesia | 2 | 1 | 0 | 1 | 3 | 2 | +1 | 3 | |
| 3 | Myanmar | 2 | 0 | 0 | 2 | 1 | 5 | −4 | 0 | |

Source: Soccerway
Rules for classification: Group stage tiebreakers

== Matches ==
=== Myanmar vs Philippines ===
5 December 2025
18:00

| Myanmar | 0–2 | Philippines |
|---|---|---|
| | Report | Monis 19'; Latt Wai Phone 50' (o.g.) |

700th Anniversary Stadium, Chiang Mai
Referee: Sadullo Gulmurodi (Tajikstan)

| Myanmar | Philippines |

| Manager: (Japan) Hisashi Kurosaki | Manager: (Spain) Michael Martínez Álvarez |

Assistant referees:
Hasan Karimov (Tajikstan)
Mohamed Jaafar Mohamed Salman (Bahrain)
Fourth official:
Ammar Ebrahim Hasan Mahfoodh (Bahrain)

=== Philippines vs Indonesia ===
8 December 2025
18:00

| Philippines | 1–0 | Indonesia |
|---|---|---|
| Banatao 45+2' | Report |

700th Anniversary Stadium, Chiang Mai
Referee: Adel Al-Naqbi (United Arab Emirates)

| Philippines | Indonesia |

| Manager: (Spain) Michael Martínez Álvarez | Manager: Indra Sjafri |

Assistant referees:
Ahmed Saeed Ahmed Alasal Alrashdi (United Arab Emirates)
Hasan Karimov (Tajikistan)
Fourth official:
Sadullo Gulmurodi (Tajikistan)

=== Indonesia vs Myanmar ===
12 December 2025
18:00

| Indonesia | 3–1 | Myanmar |
|---|---|---|
| Toni 45'; Raven 89', 90+5' | Report | Min Maw Oo 29' |

700th Anniversary Stadium, Chiang Mai
Referee: Ammar Mahfoodh (Bahrain)

| Indonesia | Myanmar |

| Manager: Indra Sjafri | Manager: (Japan) Hisashi Kurosaki |

Assistant referees:
Mohamed Jaafar Mohamed Salman (Bahrain)
Hassan Karimov (Tajikstan)
Fourth official:
Adel Ali Ahmed Khamis Al Naqbi (United Arab Emirates)
