= Philippines national under-23 football team =

Philippines U-23
- Association: Philippine Football Federation
- Confederation: AFC (Asia)
- Sub-confederation: AFF (Southeast Asia)
- Head coach: Garrath McPherson
- Captain: Sandro Reyes
- Home stadium: PFF National Training Center
- FIFA code: PHI
First colors	Second colors

Biggest win
- Timor-Leste 1–6 Philippines (Biñan, Philippines; December 4, 2019)

Biggest defeat
- Japan 13–0 Philippines (Hong Kong; June 12, 1999)

Asian Cup
- Appearances: 0

ASEAN Championship
- Appearances: 5 (first in 2005)
- Best result: Fouth place (2025)

The Philippines national under-23 football team represents the Philippines in international football competitions in the Olympic Games, Asian Games, Southeast Asian Games and any other under-23 international football tournaments. It is controlled by the Philippine Football Federation, the governing body of football in the country.

Their best finish in the ASEAN U-23 Championship is in 2025, when they reached the semifinals.

At the SEA Games, the team has achieved its best finish in the 2025 edition in Thailand by advancing to the semifinals. This at least matched the finishing of the senior team in the 1991 SEA Games.

== Results and fixtures ==
The following is a list of match results in the last 12 months, as well as any future matches that have been scheduled.

Win Draw Lose

=== 2025 ===
December 5 2025 Southeast Asian Games GS	Philippines	2–0	Myanmar	Chiangmai, Thailand
18:00 UTC+7	Monis 19'; Latt Wai Phone 50' (o.g.)	Report		Stadium: 700th Anniversary Stadium; Referee: Sadullo Gulmurodi (Tajikistan)

December 8 2025 Southeast Asian Games GS	Philippines	1–0	Indonesia	Chiangmai, Thailand
18:00 UTC+7	Banatao 45+2'	Report		Stadium: 700th Anniversary Stadium; Referee: Sadullo Gulmurodi (Tajikistan)

December 15 2025 Southeast Asian Games SF	Vietnam	2–0	Philippines	Bangkok, Thailand
15:30 UTC+7	Lê Văn Thuận 89'; Nguyễn Thanh Nhàn 90+2'	Report		Stadium: Rajamangala Stadium; Referee: Choi Hyun-jai (South Korea)

December 18 2025 SEA Games Bronze medal match	Philippines	1–2	Malaysia	Bangkok, Thailand
15:30 UTC+7	Haqimi 36' (o.g.)	Report	Danish 28'; Haqimi 43'	Stadium: Rajamangala Stadium; Attendance: 1,325; Referee: Qasim Al-Hatmi (Oman)

=== 2026 ===
September 15 2026 Asian Games	Uzbekistan	5–1	Philippines	Nagoya, Japan
15:30 UTC+9	Urinboev 30'; Saidnurullaev 60', 71'; Fayzullaev 73'; Reimov 80'	Report	Meriño 62'	Stadium: CS Asset Minato Soccer Stadium; Attendance: 306; Referee: Jin Jingyuan (China)

September 18 2026 Asian Games	Philippines	0–2	Vietnam	Nagoya, Japan
15:30 UTC+9		Report	Nguyễn Thanh Nhàn 74'; Nguyễn Lê Phát 88'	Stadium: CS Asset Minato Soccer Stadium; Attendance: 513; Referee: Hiroki Kasahara (Japan)

September 22 2026 Asian Games	Philippines	2–1	Kuwait	Nagoya, Japan
14:00 UTC+9	Rublico 19'; Aldeguer 90+1' (pen.)	Report	Woods 66' (o.g.)	Stadium: CS Asset Minato Soccer Stadium; Attendance: 682; Referee: Songkran Bunmeekiart (Thailand)

== Coaching staff ==
=== Current coaching staff ===
As of September 20, 2026

Position	Name
Head coach	(Australia) Garrath McPherson
Assistant coach	(Philippines) Randolfo Clarino
Assistant coach	(Philippines) Angelo Pagdanganan
Assistant coach	(Philippines) Ryan Fermin
Goalkeeping coach	(Philippines) Niño Datoy

=== Coaching history ===
List of head coaches of the Philippines U-23
Country	Name	Period	References / Notes
Philippines	Orlando Plagata	1991	
Philippines	Aris Caslib	2005	
Germany	Michael Weiß	2011	
Philippines	John Carmona	2012	
Scotland	Brian Reid	2013	
Australia	Jim Fraser	2015	
Philippines	Marlon Maro	2015–2017	
Philippines	Salvador Salvacion	2019	
Philippines	Anto Gonzales	2019	
Serbia	Goran Milojević	2019	
(Republic of Ireland) Ireland	Scott Cooper	2021	
England	Stewart Hall	2022	
Philippines	Norman Fegidero	2022	
Philippines	Rob Gier	2023	
Philippines	Marlon Maro	2023	
Philippines	Norman Fegidero	2024–2025	
Spain	Michael Martinez Alvarez	2025	
Australia	Garrath McPherson	2025–	

== Players ==
=== Current squad ===
The following players are included in the 23-man squad for the 2025 SEA Games.

Caps and goals updated as of December 8, 2025, after the match against Indonesia.

No.	Pos.	Player	Date of birth (age)	Caps	Goals	Club
	GK	Iñigo Castro	July 2, 2006 (aged 19)	0	0	(Philippine Football Federation) De La Salle University
	GK	Alfonso Gonzalez	January 5, 2005 (aged 20)	0	0	(Philippine Football Federation) University of the Philippines
	GK	Nicholas Guimarães	August 9, 2006 (aged 19)	10	0	(Japan Football Association) Machida Zelvia
	DF	Isaiah Alakiu	October 7, 2007 (aged 17)	3	0	(The Football Association) Brighton & Hove Albion U18
	DF	Gabriel Guimarães	August 9, 2006 (aged 19)	3	0	(Japan Football Association) Ichikawa SC
	DF	Noah Leddel	August 30, 2003 (aged 22)	12	1	(Football Association of Malaysia) Star City
	DF	Nico McMillan	April 7, 2003 (aged 22)	0	0	(Philippine Football Federation) Stallion Laguna
	DF	Joshua Meriño	February 11, 2005 (aged 20)	9	0	(Philippine Football Federation) University of the Philippines
	DF	Jaime Rosquillo	March 10, 2003 (aged 22)	18	0	(Philippine Football Federation) Dynamic Herb Cebu
	DF	Santiago Rublico	August 18, 2005 (aged 20)	7	0	(Royal Spanish Football Federation) AD Alcorcón B
	MF	Stavros Charalampous	February 23, 2005 (aged 20)	1	0	(United States Soccer Federation) California Baptist University
	MF	John Lucero	December 1, 2003 (aged 21)	17	0	(Football Association of Thailand) Kanchanaburi Power
	MF	Javier Mariona	October 17, 2004 (aged 20)	10	3	(United States Soccer Federation) AV Alta
	MF	Gavin Muens	October 24, 2004 (aged 20)	16	1	(Philippine Football Federation) Kaya–Iloilo
	MF	Antoine Ortega	May 12, 2003 (aged 22)	8	0	(Cyprus Football Association) Omonia Aradippou
	MF	Jared Peña	May 8, 2006 (aged 19)	14	0	(United States Soccer Federation) Walsh University
	MF	Sandro Reyes	March 29, 2003 (aged 22)	14	3	(German Football Association) FC Gütersloh
	FW	Andres Aldeguer	December 18, 2003 (aged 21)	10	0	(Philippine Football Federation) One Taguig
	FW	Otu Banatao	November 11, 2006 (aged 18)	10	5	(United States Soccer Federation) Old Dominion University
	FW	Dov Cariño	December 18, 2003 (aged 21)	15	2	(Philippine Football Federation) Ateneo de Manila University
	FW	Dylan Demuynck	May 6, 2004 (aged 21)	2	0	(Royal Belgian Football Association) Lierse
	FW	Selwyn Mamon	July 7, 2004 (aged 21)	7	1	(Philippine Football Federation) Far Eastern University
	FW	Alex Monis	March 20, 2003 (aged 22)	5	1	(United States Soccer Federation) CT United

=== Recent call-ups ===
The following players have been called up for the Philippines U-23 within the past 12 months.

Pos.	Player	Date of birth (age)	Caps	Goals	Club	Latest call-up
DF	Kamil Amirul	February 6, 2004 (aged 21)	12	0	(Philippines) Dynamic Herb Cebu	AFC U-23 Asian Cup qualifiers
DF	Jian Caraig	August 6, 2005 (aged 20)	7	0	University of the Philippines	AFC U-23 Asian Cup qualifiers
DF	Zachary Taningco	October 8, 2004 (aged 20)	5	0	(Philippines) Manila Digger	AFC U-23 Asian Cup qualifiers
FW	Karl Absalon	October 17, 2003 (aged 21)	4	0	(Philippines) Far Eastern University	AFC U-23 Asian Cup qualifiers
FW	Ramil Bation III	December 15, 2004 (aged 20)	0	0	University of the Philippines	AFC U-23 Asian Cup qualifiers
FW	Uriel Dalapo	August 8, 2004 (aged 21)	7	0	(Philippines) De La Salle University	AFC U-23 Asian Cup qualifiers

=== Previous squads ===
Previous squads of the Philippines
Tournament	Edition
Asian Games	2026
Southeast Asian Games	2005; 2011; 2015; 2017; 2019; 2021; 2023; 2025
ASEAN U-23 Championship	2005; 2019; 2022; 2023; 2025

== Competitive records ==
=== Olympics ===
The Philippines' Olympics Record
Year	Round	Position	GP	W	D	L	GS	GA
(Spain) 1992	Did not qualify							
(United States) 1996	Did not enter							
(Australia) 2000	Did not qualify							
(Greece) 2004	Did not enter							
(China) 2008	Did not enter							
(United Kingdom) 2012	Did not enter							
(Brazil) 2016	Did not qualify							
(Japan) 2020	Did not qualify							
(France) 2024	Did not qualify							
Total	—	–	–	–	–	–	–	–
Notes:
Football at the Summer Olympics has been an under-23 tournament since 1992.

=== AFC U-23 Asian Cup ===
The Philippines' AFC U-23 Asian Cup Record
Year	Round	Position	GP	W	D	L	GS	GA
(Oman) 2013	Did not qualify							
(Qatar) 2016	Did not qualify							
(China) 2018	Did not qualify							
(Thailand) 2020	Did not qualify							
(Uzbekistan) 2022	Did not qualify							
(Qatar) 2024	Did not qualify							
(Saudi Arabia) 2026	Did not qualify							
(Japan) 2028	To be determined							
Total	—	–	–	–	–	–	–	–

=== Asian Games ===
The Philippines' Asian Games Record
Year	Round	Position	GP	W	D	L	GS	GA
(South Korea) 2002 to (South Korea) 2014	Did not enter							
(Indonesia) 2018	Did not qualify							
(China) 2022	Did not qualify							
(Japan) 2026	Group stage	11th place	3	1	0	2	3	8
Total	Best: 11th Place	11th place	3	1	0	2	3	8
Notes:
Football at the Asian Games has been an under-23 tournament since 2002.

=== Southeast Asian Games ===
The Philippines' Southeast Asian Games Record
Year	Round	Position	GP	W	D	L	GS	GA
(Malaysia) 2001	Withdrew							
(Vietnam) 2003	Did not enter							
(Philippines) 2005	Group stage	6th place	3	1	0	2	6	7
(Thailand) 2007 to (Laos) 2009	Did not enter							
(Indonesia) 2011	Group stage	10th place	5	1	0	4	6	14
(Myanmar) 2013	Did not enter							
(Singapore) 2015	Group stage	10th place	4	0	0	4	2	11
(Malaysia) 2017	Group stage	7th place	5	2	0	3	4	10
(Philippines) 2019	Group stage	6th place	4	2	1	1	9	4
(Vietnam) 2021	Group stage	7th place	4	1	1	2	6	7
(Cambodia) 2023	Group stage	8th place	4	0	1	3	1	8
(Thailand) 2025	Knockout stage	4th place	4	2	0	2	4	4
Total	Best: Fourth Place	4th place	33	9	3	21	38	65
Notes:
Football at the Southeast Asian Games was an under-23 from 2001 to 2021. It has been an under-22 tournament since 2023.

=== ASEAN U-23 Championship ===
The Philippines' ASEAN U-23 Championship Record
Year	Round	Position	GP	W	D	L	GS	GA
(Thailand) 2005	Group stage	6th place	3	1	0	2	7	9
(Cambodia) 2019	Group stage	8th place	3	0	0	3	1	6
(Cambodia) 2022	Group stage	6th place	3	1	1	1	4	4
(Thailand) 2023	Group stage	7th place	2	0	1	1	2	3
(Indonesia) 2025	Fourth Place	4th place	5	2	0	3	6	6
Total	Best: Fourth Place	5/5	11	2	2	7	14	22
Notes:
The ASEAN U-23 Championship was an under-22 tournament in 2019.

== See also ==
- Football in the Philippines

=== Men's ===
- Philippines national football team
- Philippines national under-21 football team
- Philippines national under-19 football team
- Philippines national under-17 football team

=== Women's ===
- Philippines women's national football team
- Philippines women's national under-20 football team
- Philippines women's national under-17 football team
