= Boxing at the 2025 SEA Games =

Boxing competitions

- Venue: Chulalongkorn University Sports Center
- Location: Bangkok, Thailand
- Dates: 10–19 December
- Competitors: 95 from 9 nations

Boxing competitions at the 2025 SEA Games took place at Chulalongkorn University Sports Center in Bangkok, Thailand from 10 to 19 December 2025.

Participating nations can only field boxers in a maximum of seven weight classes for the men's division; and six weight classes in the women's division. Thailand as the host entered boxers in all weight classes.

== Medal table ==
* Host nation (Thailand)

Rank	Nation	Gold	Silver	Bronze	Total
1	Thailand*	14	2	1	17
2	Vietnam	1	5	3	9
3	Indonesia	1	4	4	9
4	Philippines	1	3	6	10
5	Singapore	0	2	3	5
6	Timor-Leste	0	1	4	5
7	Myanmar	0	0	5	5
8	Laos	0	0	3	3
9	Malaysia	0	0	2	2
Totals (9 entries)		17	17	31	65

== Medalists ==
=== Men ===
Event	Gold	Silver	Bronze
Light flyweight (48 kg)	Thitiwat Phlongaurai; Thailand	Jay Bryan Baricuatro; Philippines	Khamphouvanh Khamsathone; Laos
Light flyweight (48 kg)	Thitiwat Phlongaurai; Thailand	Jay Bryan Baricuatro; Philippines	Antonio Nicolau Hau da Silva; Timor-Leste
Flyweight (51 kg)	Vicky Tahumil Junior; Indonesia	Thitisan Panmod; Thailand	Nguyễn Minh Cường; Vietnam
Flyweight (51 kg)	Vicky Tahumil Junior; Indonesia	Thitisan Panmod; Thailand	Vanesy Heuangthisouan; Laos
Bantamweight (54 kg)	Thanarat Saengphet; Thailand	Flint Jara; Philippines	Ang Jin Yang; Singapore
Bantamweight (54 kg)	Thanarat Saengphet; Thailand	Flint Jara; Philippines	Mohamad Rizal Wahidi; Malaysia
Featherweight (57 kg)	Sarawut Sukthet; Thailand	Nguyễn Văn Đương; Vietnam	Jill Mandagie; Indonesia
Featherweight (57 kg)	Sarawut Sukthet; Thailand	Nguyễn Văn Đương; Vietnam	Muhammad Rasdenal Haikal; Malaysia
Lightweight (60 kg)	Sakda Ruamtham; Thailand	Asri Udin; Indonesia	Noke Mhal; Myanmar
Lightweight (60 kg)	Sakda Ruamtham; Thailand	Asri Udin; Indonesia	James Clark Caelan; Singapore
Light welterweight (63.5 kg)	Khunatip Pidnuch; Thailand	Elisio Raimundo Gaio; Timor-Leste	Thongnin Xayaseng; Laos
Welterweight (69 kg)	Bunjong Sinsiri; Thailand	Velvan Tan Jun Jie; Singapore	Mark Ashley Fajardo; Philippines
Welterweight (69 kg)	Bunjong Sinsiri; Thailand	Velvan Tan Jun Jie; Singapore	Alexandre Meliano da Costa Freitas; Timor-Leste
Middleweight (75 kg)	Weerapon Jongjoho; Thailand	Bùi Phước Tùng; Vietnam	Francisco Moratti Gaspar da Costa Lobo; Timor-Leste
Middleweight (75 kg)	Weerapon Jongjoho; Thailand	Bùi Phước Tùng; Vietnam	Weljon Mindoro; Philippines
Light heavyweight (80 kg)	Eumir Marcial; Philippines	Maikhel Roberrd Muskita; Indonesia	Nguyễn Mạnh Cường; Vietnam
Light heavyweight (80 kg)	Eumir Marcial; Philippines	Maikhel Roberrd Muskita; Indonesia	Jakkapong Yomkhot; Thailand

=== Women ===
Event	Gold	Silver	Bronze
Light flyweight (48 kg)	Thipsatcha Yodwaree; Thailand	Ngô Ngọc Linh Chi; Vietnam	Do Mathialagan Danisha; Singapore
Light flyweight (48 kg)	Thipsatcha Yodwaree; Thailand	Ngô Ngọc Linh Chi; Vietnam	Ofelia Magno; Philippines
Flyweight (50 kg)	Chuthamat Raksat; Thailand	Aira Villegas; Philippines	Israellah Athena Bonita Saweho; Indonesia
Flyweight (50 kg)	Chuthamat Raksat; Thailand	Aira Villegas; Philippines	Mya Moe Thu; Myanmar
Bantamweight (54 kg)	Natnicha Chongprongklang; Thailand	Nabila Maharani; Indonesia	Võ Thị Kim Ánh; Vietnam
Bantamweight (54 kg)	Natnicha Chongprongklang; Thailand	Nabila Maharani; Indonesia	Htar Htar Nwe; Myanmar
Featherweight (57 kg)	Punrawee Ruenros; Thailand	Nguyễn Huyền Trân; Vietnam	Alfianita Kartika Manopo; Indonesia
Featherweight (57 kg)	Punrawee Ruenros; Thailand	Nguyễn Huyền Trân; Vietnam	Shu Myat Noe; Myanmar
Lightweight (60 kg)	Hà Thị Linh; Vietnam	Apisada Tantawa; Thailand	Riza Pasuit; Philippines
Lightweight (60 kg)	Hà Thị Linh; Vietnam	Apisada Tantawa; Thailand	Manguntu Maria Meisita; Indonesia
Light welterweight (63 kg)	Thananya Somnuek; Thailand	Huswatun Hasanah; Indonesia	Nesthy Petecio; Philippines
Welterweight (66 kg)	Janjaem Suwannapheng; Thailand	Leah-Diane Warden Xiu Yu; Singapore	Kay Thwe Nyein; Myanmar
Welterweight (66 kg)	Janjaem Suwannapheng; Thailand	Leah-Diane Warden Xiu Yu; Singapore	Titania da Silva Quintas; Timor-Leste
Light middleweight (70 kg)	Baison Manikon; Thailand	Hoàng Ngọc Mai; Vietnam	Hergie Bacyadan; Philippines

== Results ==
=== Men's ===
==== Light flyweight (48 kg) ====
Quarterfinals
Dio Koebanu (INA)	0
Thitiwat Phlongaurai (THA)	5
Jay Bryan Baricuatro (PHI)	5
Nguyễn Linh Phụng (VIE)	0

Semifinals
Khamphouvanh Khamsathone (LAO)
Thitiwat Phlongaurai (THA)	RSC R2
Jay Bryan Baricuatro (PHI)	RSC 1
Antonio Nicolau Hau da Silva (TLS)

Final
Thitiwat Phlongaurai (THA)	4
Jay Bryan Baricuatro (PHI)	1

==== Flyweight (51 kg) ====
Quarterfinals
Muhammad Abdul Qaiyum Ariffin (MAS)	2
Vicky Tahumil Junior (INA)	3

Semifinals
Nguyễn Minh Cường (VIE)	0
Vicky Tahumil Junior (INA)	5
Vanesy Heuangthisouan (LAO)
Thitisan Panmod (THA)	RSC R3

Final
Vicky Tahumil Junior (INA)	3
Thitisan Panmod (THA)	2

==== Bantamweight (54 kg) ====
Quarterfinals
Flanuari Yerikho Daud (INA)	2
Flint Jara (PHI)	3
Alexandro Jacob Gonçalves (TLS)	0
Mohamad Rizal Wahidi (MAS)	5
Trần Quang Lộc (VIE)	0
Thanarat Saengphet (THA)	5

Semifinals
Ang Jin Yang (SGP)	0
Flint Jara (PHI)	5
Mohamad Rizal Wahidi (MAS)	0
Thanarat Saengphet (THA)	5

Final
Flint Jara (PHI)	0
Thanarat Saengphet (THA)	5

==== Featherweight (57 kg) ====
Quarterfinals
Grigorio de Jesus (TLS)	0
Nguyễn Văn Đương (VIE)	5
La Min Ko Ko (MYA)	0
Jill Mandagie (INA)	5
Ian Clark Bautista (PHI)	0
Sarawut Sukthet (THA)	5
Muhammad Rasdenal Haikal (MAS)	RSC R3
Souliya Khammy (LAO)

Semifinals
Nguyễn Văn Đương (VIE)	4
Jill Mandagie (INA)	1
Sarawut Sukthet (THA)	5
Muhammad Rasdenal Haikal (MAS)	0

Final
Nguyễn Văn Đương (VIE)	0
Sarawut Sukthet (THA)	5

==== Lightweight (60 kg) ====
Quarterfinals
Muhammad Ridzuan Mohd Johari (MAS)	0
Asri Udin (INA)	5
Junmilardo Ogayre (PHI)	0
Sakda Ruamtham (THA)	5

Semifinals
Noke Mhal (MYA)
Asri Udin (INA)	RSC R2
Sakda Ruamtham (THA)	5
James Clark Caelan (SGP)	0

Final
Asri Udin (INA)	0
Sakda Ruamtham (THA)	5

==== Light welterweight (63.5 kg) ====
Semifinals
Thongnin Xayaseng (LAO)
Khunatip Pidnuch (THA)	RSC R3

Final
Elisio Raimundo Gaio (TLS)	0
Khunatip Pidnuch (THA)	5

==== Welterweight (69 kg) ====
Round of 16
Nguyễn Đức Ngọc (VIE)	0
Mark Ashley Fajardo (PHI)	5

Quarterfinals
Jerki Riwu (INA)
Mark Ashley Fajardo (PHI)	RSC R1
Muhammad Ariff Aiman Mohd Farid (MAS)	0
Bunjong Sinsiri (THA)	5
Somphan Chalounseng (LAO)
Alexandre Meliano da Costa Freitas (TLS)	RSC R1
Thiha Zaw (MYA)
Velvan Tan Jun Jie (SGP)	RSC R1

Semifinals
Mark Ashley Fajardo (PHI)	0
Bunjong Sinsiri (THA)	5
Alexandre Meliano da Costa Freitas (TLS)
Velvan Tan Jun Jie (SGP)	RSC R3

Final
Bunjong Sinsiri (THA)	4
Velvan Tan Jun Jie (SGP)	1

==== Middleweight (75 kg) ====
Quarterfinals
Weerapon Jongjoho (THA)	5
Mohd Firdaus Aziz (MAS)	0

Semifinals
Francisco Moratti Gaspar da Costa Lobo (TLS)
Weerapon Jongjoho (THA)	RSC R2
Weljon Mindoro (PHI)	0
Bùi Phước Tùng (VIE)	5

Final
Weerapon Jongjoho (THA)	5
Bùi Phước Tùng (VIE)	0

==== Light heavyweight (80 kg) ====
Quarterfinals
Jeremias Mendonca Amaral (TLS)	0
Nguyễn Mạnh Cường (VIE)	5

Semifinals
Eumir Marcial (PHI)	KO
Nguyễn Mạnh Cường (VIE)
Jakkapong Yomkhot (THA)	1
Maikhel Roberrd Muskita (INA)	4

Final
Eumir Marcial (PHI)	4
Maikhel Roberrd Muskita (INA)	1

=== Women's ===
==== Light flyweight (48 kg) ====
Quarterfinals
Domingas de Araujo Barros (TLS)
Thipsatcha Yodwaree (THA)	RSC R1
Ngô Ngọc Linh Chi (VIE)	4
Merlin Tomatala (INA)	1
Ofelia Magno (PHI)	4
Aye Nyein Htoo (MYA)	1

Semifinals
Do Mathialagan Danisha (SGP)	2
Thipsatcha Yodwaree (THA)	3
Ngô Ngọc Linh Chi (VIE)	4
Ofelia Magno (PHI)	1

Final
Thipsatcha Yodwaree (THA)	4
Ngô Ngọc Linh Chi (VIE)	1

==== Flyweight (50 kg) ====
Quarterfinals
Nguyễn Thị Ngọc Trân (VIE)	0
Chuthamat Raksat (THA)	5

Semifinals
Israellah Athena Bonita Saweho (INA)	1
Chuthamat Raksat (THA)	4
Aira Villegas (PHI)	5
Mya Moe Thu (MYA)	0

Final
Chuthamat Raksat (THA)	5
Aira Villegas (PHI)	0

==== Bantamweight (54 kg) ====
Quarterfinals
Võ Thị Kim Ánh (VIE)	5
Claudine Veloso (PHI)	0

Semifinals
Natnicha Chongprongklang (THA)	4
Võ Thị Kim Ánh (VIE)	1
Htar Htar Nwe (MYA)	0
Nabila Maharani (INA)	5

Final
Natnicha Chongprongklang (THA)	4
Nabila Maharani (INA)	1

==== Featherweight (57 kg) ====
Semifinals
Alfianita Kartika Manopo (INA)	0
Punrawee Ruenros (THA)	5
Nguyễn Huyền Trân (VIE)	5
Shu Myat Noe (MYA)	0

Final
Punrawee Ruenros (THA)	5
Nguyễn Huyền Trân (VIE)	0

==== Lightweight (60 kg) ====
Quarterfinals
Kiimsian Deihsang (MYA)
Apisada Tantawa (THA)	RSC R1

Semifinals
Riza Pasuit (PHI)	0
Apisada Tantawa (THA)	5
Hà Thị Linh (VIE)	5
Manguntu Maria Meisita (INA)	0

Final
Apisada Tantawa (THA)	0
Hà Thị Linh (VIE)	5

==== Light welterweight (63 kg) ====
Semifinals
Huswatun Hasanah (INA)	3
Nesthy Petecio (PHI)	2

Final
Thananya Somnuek (THA)	4
Huswatun Hasanah (INA)	0

==== Welterweight (66 kg) ====
Semifinals
Janjaem Suwannapheng (THA)	5
Kay Thwe Nyein (MYA)	0
Titania da Silva Quintas (TLS)
Leah-Diane Warden Xiu Yu (SGP)	RSC R1

Final
Janjaem Suwannapheng (THA)	5
Leah-Diane Warden Xiu Yu (SGP)	0

==== Light middleweight (70 kg) ====
Semifinals
Hergie Bacyadan (PHI)	0
Baison Manikon (THA)	4

Final
Hoàng Ngọc Mai (VIE)	1
Baison Manikon (THA)	4
