= Football at the 2025 SEA Games – Men's tournament – Group A =

Group A of the men's football tournament at the 2025 SEA Games was played from 3 to 11 December 2025. The group consisted of hosts Thailand, Singapore, and Timor-Leste. Originally, Cambodia were drawn in this group, but due to their withdrawal, they were replaced by Singapore.

== Teams ==
Draw position	Team	SEA Games appearance	Last appearance	Previous best performance
A1	Thailand	33rd	2023	Gold medalists (1965, 1975, 1981, 1983, 1985, 1965, 1995, 1997, 1999, 2001, 2003, 2005, 2007, 2013, 2015, 2017)
A2	Singapore	22nd	2023	Silver medalists (1983, 1985, 1989)
A3	Timor-Leste	9th	2023	Sixth place (2011)

== Standings ==
Pos	Team	Pld	W	D	L	GF	GA	GD	Pts	Qualification
1	Thailand (H)	2	2	0	0	9	1	+8	6	Advance to knockout stage
2	Timor-Leste	2	1	0	1	4	7	−3	3	
3	Singapore	2	0	0	2	1	6	−5	0	

Source: Soccerway
Rules for classification: Group stage tiebreakers
(H) Hosts

== Matches ==
=== Timor-Leste vs Thailand ===
3 December 2025
19:00

Timor-Leste	1–6	Thailand
Palomito 90+3'	Report	Yotsakorn B. 44', 70', 72'; Siraphop 49'; Iklas 60'; Kakana 83'

Rajamangala Stadium, Bangkok (Note: Originally planned to be held in Tinsulanon Stadium, but moved to Rajamangala Stadium due to safety concerns)
Attendance: 7,741
Referee: Choi Hyun-jai (South Korea)

Timor-Leste	Thailand

Manager: (Indonesia) Emral Abus	Manager: Thawatchai Damrong-Ongtrakul

Assistant referees:
Bang Gi-yeol (South Korea)
Alireza Ildorom (Iran)
Fourth official:
Mooud Bonyadifard (Iran)

=== Singapore vs Timor-Leste ===
6 December 2025
19:00

Singapore	1–3	Timor-Leste
Amir 11'	Report	Canavaro 19'; Correia 42'; Olagar 45+1'

Rajamangala Stadium, Bangkok
Referee: Asker Nadjafaliev (Uzbekistan)

Singapore	Timor-Leste

Manager: Firdaus Kassim	Manager: (Indonesia) Emral Abus

Assistant referees:
Ruslan Serazitdinov (Uzbekistan)
Bang Gi-yeol (South Korea)
Fourth official:
Choi Hyun-jai (South Korea)

=== Thailand vs Singapore ===
11 December 2025
19:00

Thailand	3–0	Singapore
Siraphop 49'; Yotsakorn B. 51', 55'	Report

Rajamangala Stadium, Bangkok
Attendance: 7,896
Referee: Mooud Bonyadifard (Iran)

Thailand	Singapore

Manager: Thawatchai Damrong-Ongtrakul	Manager: Firdaus Kassim

Assistant referees:
Alireza Ildorom (Iran)
Ruslan Serazitdinov (Uzbekistan)
Fourth official:
Asker Nadjafaliev (Uzbekistan)
