= Moses Raj =

Malaysian footballer (born 2005)

Personal information
- Full name: Moses Raj a/l Michel Dass
- Date of birth: 10 August 2005 (age 21)
- Place of birth: Ipoh, Perak, Malaysia
- Height: 1.83 m (6 ft 0 in)
- Position: Defender

Team information
- Current team: Selangor

Youth career
- 2024–2025: Perak II
- 2025–: Selangor U-23

Senior career*
Years	Team	Apps	(Gls)
2025–	Selangor	0	(0)

International career^{‡}
2024–	Malaysia U19	4	(1)
2024–	Malaysia U23		
Medal record
Malaysia
SEA Games
Bronze medal – third place	2025 Thailand	Team
- * Club domestic league appearances and goals as of 18 July 2025 ‡ National team caps and goals as of 29 September 2024

Moses Raj a/l Michel Dass (born 10 August 2005) is a Malaysian professional footballer who plays as a centre back for Malaysia Super League club Selangor.

== Club career ==
=== Perak ===
Moses began playing football at the age of 11, taking part in school-based tournaments and amateur leagues. He later joined Perak III, where he became a key player in the club's President Cup squad. At the age of 19, he was promoted to Perak II, the club's reserve team. Although he was named as a substitute for several matches, but remaining an unused substitute. In November 2024, Moses signed his first professional contract with Perak.

=== Selangor ===
On 6 July 2025, Moses joined Selangor from Perak on a permanent deal.

== International career ==
Moses received his first call up to the Malaysia U19 squad for the 2025 AFC U-20 Asian Cup qualification. He made his debut and scored his first goal in a 2–1 victory against Oman U20 in September 2024.

== Honours ==
=== International ===
Malaysia U-23

- Southeast Asian Games

(bronze) Bronze medal: 2025
