= Trần Trung Kiên =

Vietnamese footballer (born 2003)

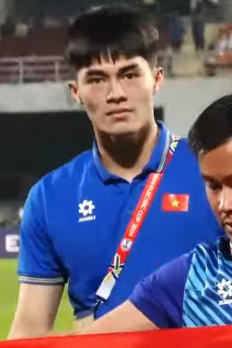
- Trung Kiên in 2025

Personal information
- Full name: Trần Trung Kiên
- Date of birth: 9 February 2003 (age 23)
- Place of birth: Pleiku, Gia Lai, Vietnam
- Height: 1.91 m (6 ft 3 in)
- Position: Goalkeeper

Team information
- Current team: Hoàng Anh Gia Lai
- Number: 25

Youth career
- 2018–2022: Hoàng Anh Gia Lai

Senior career*
| Years | Team | Apps | (Gls) |
| 2022– | Hoàng Anh Gia Lai | 64 | (0) |
| 2022 | → Công An Nhân Dân (loan) | 0 | (0) |
| 2022 | → Đồng Nai (loan) | 6 | (0) |

International career^{‡}
| 2023–2026 | Vietnam U23 | 19 | (0) |
| 2025– | Vietnam | 2 | (0) |
Medal record
Men's football
Representing Vietnam
AFC U-23 Asian Cup
| Third place | Saudi Arabia 2026 |
ASEAN Championship
| Winner | ASEAN 2024 |
ASEAN U-23 Championship
| Winner | Thailand 2023 |
| Winner | Indonesia 2025 |
SEA Games
| Gold medal – first place | Thailand 2025 |
- * Club domestic league appearances and goals as of 20 November 2026 ‡ National team caps and goals as of 17 November 2026

Trần Trung Kiên (born 9 February 2003) is a Vietnamese professional footballer who plays as a goalkeeper for V.League 1 club Hoàng Anh Gia Lai and the Vietnam national team.

== Club career ==
Trung Kiên began his football career in 2018 after he was admitted to the Hoàng Anh Gia Lai thanks to his superior height (1.88 m) compared to his peers.

In 2022, Trung Kiên was loaned to V.League 2 side Công An Nhân Dân, then to Vietnamese Football League Second Division side Đồng Nai. He won the 2022 V.League 2 without playing a single minute.

On 5 August 2023, Trung Kiên made his professional debut in Hoàng Anh Gia Lai's 0–1 V.League 1 loss against Hồ Chí Minh City.

== International career ==
Trần Trung Kiên was included in Vietnam U23 squad for the 2023 AFF U-23 Championship. He did not appear in any game as Vietnam later won the tournament.

In October 2024, Trung Kiên received his first call up to the Vietnam national team for the friendly game against India.

In December 2024, Trung Kiên was named in Vietnam's 26-man squad for the 2024 ASEAN Championship.

In July 2025, Trung Kiên was included in Vietnam U23 squad for the 2025 ASEAN U-23 Championship. He played in all the matches and helped the Vietnam U23 team win the championship.

On 14 October 2025, Trung Kiên made his international debut against Nepal in the third qualifying round of 2027 AFC Asian Cup qualification.

== Career statistics ==
=== Club ===
As of match played 20 November 2026

Appearances and goals by club, season and competition
| Club | Season | League | | | National cup | | Continental | | Other | | Total | |
| Club | Season | Division | Apps | Goals | Apps | Goals | Apps | Goals | Apps | Goals | Apps | Goals |
|---|---|---|---|---|---|---|---|---|---|---|---|---|
| Hoàng Anh Gia Lai | 2022 | V.League 1 | 0 | 0 | 0 | 0 | — | | — | | 0 | 0 |
| Hoàng Anh Gia Lai | 2023 | V.League 1 | 2 | 0 | 0 | 0 | — | | — | | 2 | 0 |
| Hoàng Anh Gia Lai | 2023–24 | V.League 1 | 6 | 0 | 0 | 0 | — | | — | | 6 | 0 |
| Hoàng Anh Gia Lai | 2024–25 | V.League 1 | 24 | 0 | 2 | 0 | — | | — | | 26 | 0 |
| Hoàng Anh Gia Lai | 2025–26 | V.League 1 | 24 | 0 | 1 | 0 | — | | — | | 25 | 0 |
| Hoàng Anh Gia Lai | 2026–27 | V.League 1 | 8 | 0 | 1 | 0 | — | | — | | 9 | 0 |
| Hoàng Anh Gia Lai | Total | | 64 | 0 | 4 | 0 | 0 | 0 | 0 | 0 | 68 | 0 |
| Công An Nhân Dân (loan) | 2022 | V.League 2 | 0 | 0 | 0 | 0 | — | | — | | 0 | 0 |
| Đồng Nai (loan) | 2022 | Vietnamese Second Division | 6 | 0 | — | | — | | 1 (Note: Appearances in Second Division final stage) | 0 | 7 | 0 |
| Career total | | | 70 | 0 | 4 | 0 | 0 | 0 | 1 | 0 | 75 | 0 |

=== International ===
As of match played 14 October 2025

Appearances and goals by national team and year
| National team | Year | Apps | Goals |
|---|---|---|---|
| Vietnam | 2025 | 1 | 0 |
| Total | | 1 | 0 |

== Honours ==
Công An Nhân Dân

- V.League 2: 2022

Vietnam U23

- ASEAN U-23 Championship: 2023, 2025
- SEA Games gold medal: 2025
- AFC U-23 Asian Cup: third place 2026

Vietnam

- ASEAN Championship: 2024, 2026
