= Võ Anh Quân =

Vietnamese footballer

Personal information
- Full name: Võ Anh Quân
- Date of birth: 7 May 2004 (age 22)
- Place of birth: Quảng Bình, Vietnam
- Height: 1.73 m (5 ft 8 in)
- Positions: Right-back; winger

Team information
- Current team: Công An Nhân Dân
- Number: 20

Youth career
- 2015–2022: PVF

Senior career*
Years	Team	Apps	(Gls)
2022–	Công An Nhân Dân	53	(4)
2024–2025	→ Phù Đổng Ninh Bình (loan)	11	(0)

International career^{‡}
2019	Vietnam U16	14	(4)
2025–2026	Vietnam U23	21	(0)
Medal record
Men's football
Representing Vietnam
AFC U-23 Asian Cup
Third place	Saudi Arabia 2026
ASEAN U-23 Championship
Winner	Indonesia 2025
- * Club domestic league appearances and goals as of 12 June 2026 ‡ National team caps and goals as of 25 September 2026

Võ Anh Quân (born 7 May 2004) is a Vietnamese professional footballer who plays as a right-back or winger for V.League 2 club Công An Nhân Dân.

== Club career ==
Anh Quân joined the PVF Football Academy in 2015, after being named as the best player in Quảng Bình's U-11 football tournament. He made his professional debut in the 2022 V.League 2 with Phố Hiến, PVF's first team.

In October 2025, Anh Quân was loaned to V.League 2 fellow Phù Đổng Ninh Bình for one season. There, he had 4 assists in the 2024–25 V.League 2, contributing to help the club win the league.

== International career ==
With Vietnam U16, Anh Quân played in the 2019 AFF U-15 Championship and scored 2 goals during the tournament.

In July 2025, Anh Quân featured in Vietnam U23's squad for the 2025 ASEAN U-23 Championship. He was a starter for Vietnam during the competition and helped the team defend their title.

== Honours ==
Phù Đổng Ninh Bình

- V.League 2: 2024–25

Vietnam U23

- ASEAN U-23 Championship: 2025
- SEA Games gold medal: 2025
- AFC U-23 Asian Cup third place: 2026
