= Otu Banatao =

Filipino footballer (born 2006)

Personal information
- Full name: Otu Abang Banatao
- Date of birth: November 11, 2006 (age 19)
- Place of birth: Fairfax, Virginia
- Height: 1.83 m (6 ft 0 in)
- Position: Striker

Team information
- Current team: Old Dominion University
- Number: 16

Youth career
- Virginia Development Academy
- –2025: D.C. United

College career
Years	Team	Apps	(Gls)
2025–	Old Dominion University	12	(3)

International career^{‡}
2024	Philippines U-19	3	(2)
2024	Philippines U-20	3	(1)
2025–	Philippines U-22	4	(1)
2025–	Philippines U-23	8	(4)
- ‡ National team caps and goals as of January 10, 2026

Otu Abang Banatao (born November 11, 2006), also known as Otu Bisong, is a Filipino professional footballer who plays as a striker for the Old Dominion Monarchs. Born in the United States, he represents the Philippines at the under-23 level.

== Personal life ==
Banatao was born in Fairfax, Virginia, to an American father and a Filipino mother. He studied in Herndon High School. When playing football for the Philippines, he opted to use his mother's surname of Banatao.

== Career ==
Growing up in Herndon, Banatao also played youth soccer for Virginia Development Academy. Up until his graduation from high school, he was also a member of D.C. United's youth team. In 2025, he joined the soccer team of Old Dominion University. He made his first start against Coastal Carolina University, also scoring his first two goals.

== International career ==
=== Philippines U19 ===
After getting his passport, Banatao was called up to the Philippines under-19 team for the 2024 ASEAN U-19 Boys Championship in Indonesia. On the second game against Timor-Leste, he scored two goals. He was called up once more for the 2025 AFC U-20 Asian Cup qualifiers, scoring in the last match against Brunei.

=== Philippines U23 ===
One year later, Banatao was called up to the Philippines under-23 squad for the 2025 ASEAN U-23 Championship. In the opening match against Malaysia he scored two goals in the first half, leading the team to a historic win. The Philippines would end up making the semifinals for the first time. At the tournament's end, he was awarded the Rising Star Award.

Bisong once again played for the U23 team in the 2025 SEA Games in Thailand. He scored the only goal of the game against Indonesia off a long throw, giving the team another historic win. The Philippines would also make the semifinals.
