= Nguyễn Đình Bắc =

Vietnamese footballer (born 2004)

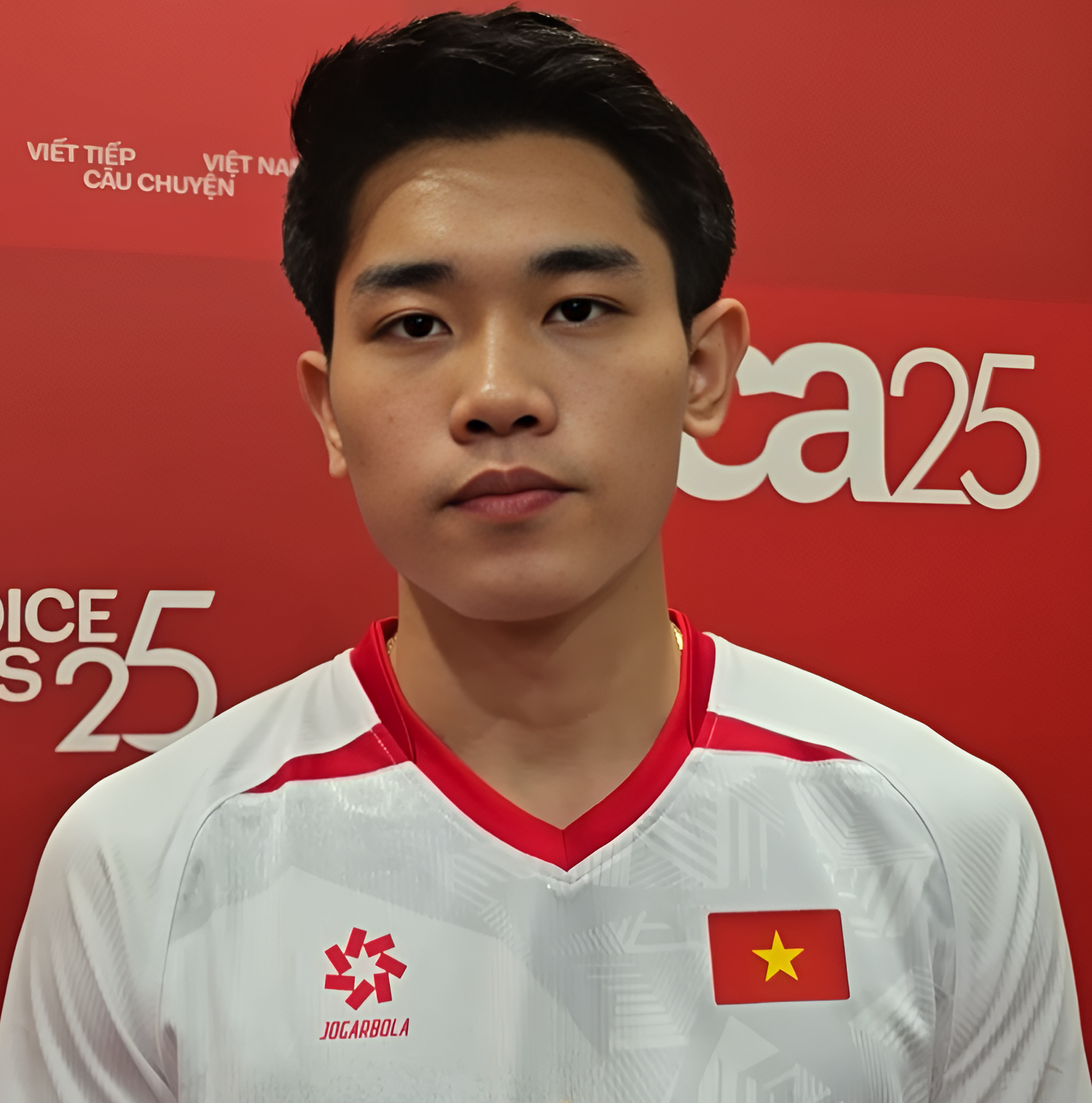
- Đình Bắc with Vietnam in 2026

Personal information
- Full name: Nguyễn Đình Bắc
- Date of birth: 19 August 2004 (age 22)
- Place of birth: Hưng Nguyên, Nghệ An, Vietnam
- Height: 1.79 m (5 ft 10 in)
- Positions: Winger; forward

Team information
- Current team: Công An Hà Nội
- Number: 9

Youth career
- 2014–2018: Sông Lam Nghệ An
- 2019–2022: Quảng Nam
- 2022: → Hồng Lĩnh Hà Tĩnh (loan)

Senior career*
Years	Team	Apps	(Gls)
2022	Quảng Nam B	9	(6)
2022–2024	Quảng Nam	25	(10)
2024–	Công An Hà Nội	45	(12)

International career^{‡}
2022–2023	Vietnam U20	13	(2)
2023–2026	Vietnam U23	31	(10)
2023–	Vietnam	28	(12)
Medal record
Men's football
Representing Vietnam
ASEAN Championship
Winner	ASEAN 2026
AFC U-23 Asian Cup
Third place	Saudi Arabia 2026
ASEAN U-23 Championship
Winner	Indonesia 2025
AFF U-19 Youth Championship
Third place	Indonesia 2022
SEA Games
Gold medal – first place	Bangkok 2025
- * Club domestic league appearances and goals as of 8 November 2026 ‡ National team caps and goals as of 17 November 2026

Nguyễn Đình Bắc (born 19 August 2004) is a Vietnamese professional footballer who plays as a winger or forward for V.League 1 club Công An Hà Nội and the Vietnam national team.

== Early career ==
Born in Nghệ An, Đình Bắc was a member of the Sông Lam Nghệ An youth academy. However, he was released by the team in 2018 due to unsatisfactory physical condition with his height being only 1.50 m. In 2019, he followed his parents and moved to Quảng Nam province. Here, he joined the youth academy of Quảng Nam.

== Club career ==
=== Quảng Nam ===
Đình Bắc made his senior debut for Quang Nam's reserve side in the 2022 Vietnamese Second Division. In the match against SHB Đà Nẵng's reserve, he showed disrespectful behavior towards the referee and was consequently suspended for three games by the Vietnam Football Federation. Despite missing a few games, he scored a total of 6 goals during the season and helped his team finished 4th in their group.

In the second half of the 2022 V.League 2 season, Đình Bắc was promoted to the senior team but didn't make any appearance. He made his first team debut on 1 April 2023 in his Quảng Nam's Vietnamese Cup game against his hometown club Sông Lam Nghệ An. Đình Bắc played full 90 minutes and scored in the penalty-shootout, winning 4–3 for his team after the game was tied 1–1. On 22 July 2023, he scored his first V.League 2 goal against PVF-CAND in a 2–0 win. A month after, he scored the first haul in his career in Quảng Nam's 7–1 V.League 2 win against Bình Thuận. After 12 matches, Đình Bắc had 8 goals and 7 assists making him the second highest goal scorer of the team during the season, as his team was crowned as V.League 2 champion. Đình Bắc was also given the V.League 2 "Player of the season" award, therefore became the youngest player to win it.

On 2 December 2023, he scored his first V.League 1 goal from a penalty kick in a 4–4 draw against his hometown club Sông Lam Nghệ An. On 21 February 2024, Quảng Nam's head coach Văn Sỹ Sơn announced that Đình Bắc would be suspended by the club and sent to train with the youth team due to repeated violations of discipline. Đình Bắc later publicly apologized for his behavior and was ruled out of Quảng Nam's squad for three league games in a row. He made his return on 4 March 2024 in Quảng Nam's 1–1 draw against Quy Nhơn Bình Định. After the injury he picked up from the 2024 AFC U-23 Asian Cup, Đình Bắc sat out during two months and in the last two matchdays of the league against Hồ Chí Minh City and Thép Xanh Nam Định, where he both entried the last as a substitute player.

==== Collapsed loan deal to Hà Nội ====
On 9 March 2024, Hà Nội announced the signing of Nguyễn Đình Bắc from Quảng Nam on loan with a duration of 1.5 years. Despite the Hà Nội's announcement of his signature, Đình Bắc had not officially signed a contract with the club. On 13 March, the deal eventually collapsed as both sides failed to find a common agreement.

=== Công An Hà Nội ===
On 21 August 2024, Đình Bắc joined V.League 1 fellow Công An Hà Nội. He made his debut with the team on 23 August 2024, entering the field in the 70th minute to replace Phan Văn Đức in Công An Hà Nội's 2–1 home victory against Buriram United, as part of the 2024–25 ASEAN Club Championship. In his first season with Công An Hà Nội, he won the Vietnamese Cup.

On 9 August 2025, Đình Bắc scored against Thép Xanh Nam Định in the 2025 Vietnamese Super Cup game, with Công An Hà Nội gaining a 3–2 win. On 27 November, he scored the first goal in continental level, in a 2–1 win over Beijing Guoan, to help his team secure a place in the AFC Champions League Two knockout stage.

== International career ==
=== Youth ===
In 2022, Đình Bắc participated in the 2022 AFF U-19 Youth Championship with Vietnam under 19s as they finished in the third place.

In the following year, he was named in Vietnam U20 squad for the 2023 AFC U-20 Asian Cup and played in two group stage matches before Vietnam was eliminated.

In April 2024, Đình Bắc was named in Vietnam U23's squad for the 2024 AFC U-23 Asian Cup, held in Qatar. In the first group stage game against Kuwait, he suffered an ankle ligament injury after tackling an opponent player, and was subbed out in the 10th minute of the game. He missed the rest of the tournament as Vietnam reached the quarter-finals.

In July 2025, Đình Bắc featured with Vietnam U23 in his first ASEAN U-23 Championship. He played in all games and scored 2 goals during the campaign, thus contributed in Vietnam's final victory. He was then named as the tournament's Most Valuable Player. Later in the year, as the team's vice-captain, he contributed significantly in Vietnam's Gold medal win at the 2025 SEA Games. He scored 3 goals in the tournament, including a goal in the final against host team Thailand.

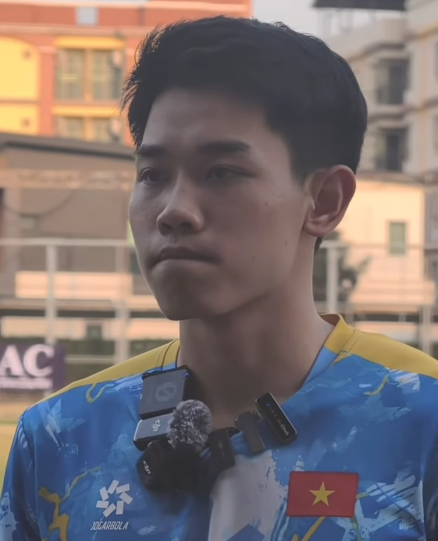
Đình Bắc in 2025

In January 2026, Đình Bắc participated with Vietnam U23 in his second AFC U-23 Asian Cup. He played in all games, scored 4 goals and had 2 assists in the tournament, contributed in Vietnam's bronze medal, the first medal in eight years of the nation in the tournament. He was then named as the tournament's Top Scorer, making him the first Vietnamese player to win an individual award in the tournament history.

=== Senior ===
In October 2023, Đình Bắc received his first call up to the Vietnam national team. He made his international debut on 10 October 2023, in Vietnam's 0–2 defeat against China, thus making him the first 2004 born player to appear for his national team. On 16 November 2023, he scored his first goal for national team in a 2–0 win over Philippines as part of 2026 FIFA World Cup qualification.

In January 2024, Đình Bắc was selected by coach Philippe Troussier in Vietnam's 26-men squad for the 2023 AFC Asian Cup and was the youngest member of the squad. He scored Vietnam's first goal of the tournament in the team's 4–2 loss to Japan on 14 January.

On 24 July 2026, Đình Bắc scored his first international hat-trick in a 7–0 thrasing win against Timor-Leste in the 2026 ASEAN Championship. This was followed with a brace against Cambodia at Mỹ Đình National Stadium to help Vietnam advance to the semi-finals, where he provided an assist to Nguyễn Xuân Son in the second leg against Malaysia to send his nation to the final. Đình Bắc assisted the opening goal against Thailand in the first leg, which contributed to Vietnam eventually winning 4–2 on aggregate, earning his first honour with the national team. With five goals and three assists, Đình Bắc was named the best player of the tournament, and was tied with teammate Nguyễn Xuân Son as the competition's top-scorer.

== Playing style ==
Đình Bắc is a versatile player who can play well as a winger, as a striker, as well as an attacking midfielder. These capacities allow him to operate both as a goalscorer and a playmaker. His fast, technical and energetic dribbling ability, as well as his agility in close spaces made him a major offensive threat. He also possesses strength in his hamstrings and quads, allowing him to remain balanced after physical challenges and make breakthrough runs past the opponent. His playing style is similar to that of Đinh Thanh Trung, who won the 2017 Vietnamese Golden Ball.

== Career statistics ==
=== Club ===
As of match played 8 November 2026

Appearances and goals by club, season and competition
Club	Season	League			National cup		Continental		Other		Total	
Club	Season	Division	Apps	Goals	Apps	Goals	Apps	Goals	Apps	Goals	Apps	Goals
Quảng Nam B	2022	Second Division	9	6	—		—		—		9	6
Quảng Nam	2023	V.League 2	14	8	2	0	—		—		16	8
Quảng Nam	2023–24	V.League 1	11	2	1	1	—		—		12	3
Quảng Nam	Total		25	10	3	1	0	0	—		28	11
Công An Hà Nội	2024–25	V.League 1	15	1	2	0	—		4 (Note: Appearances in ASEAN Club Championship)	2	21	3
Công An Hà Nội	2025–26	V.League 1	23	10	1	0	7 (Note: Appearances in AFC Champions League Two)	2	3 (Note: One appearance and one goal in Vietnamese Super Cup; two appearances in ASEAN Club Championship)	1	34	13
Công An Hà Nội	2026–27	V.League 1	7	1	0	0	3 (Note: Appearances in AFC Champions League Elite)	0	2 (Note: One appearance and one goal in Vietnamese Super Cup; one appearance in ASEAN Club Championship)	1	12	2
Công An Hà Nội	Total		45	12	3	0	10	2	9	4	67	18
Total career			79	28	6	1	10	2	9	4	104	35

=== International ===
As of match played 17 November 2026

Appearances and goals by national team and year
National team	Year	Apps	Goals
Vietnam	2023	5	1
Vietnam	2024	6	1
Vietnam	2025	2	0
Vietnam	2026	15	10
Total		28	12

Scores and results list Vietnam's goal tally first.

No.	Date	Venue	Opponent	Score	Result	Competition
1	16 November 2023	Rizal Memorial Stadium, Manila, Philippines	Philippines	2–0	2–0	2026 FIFA World Cup qualification
2	14 January 2024	Al Thumama Stadium, Doha, Qatar	Japan	1–1	2–4	2023 AFC Asian Cup
3	18 July 2026	Thái Nguyên Stadium, Thái Nguyên, Vietnam	Myanmar	4–0	4–0	Friendly
4	24 July 2026	Chonburi Stadium, Chonburi, Thailand	Timor-Leste	2–0	7–0	2026 ASEAN Championship
5	24 July 2026	Chonburi Stadium, Chonburi, Thailand	Timor-Leste	4–0	7–0	2026 ASEAN Championship
6	24 July 2026	Chonburi Stadium, Chonburi, Thailand	Timor-Leste	6–0	7–0	2026 ASEAN Championship
7	7 August 2026	Mỹ Đình National Stadium, Hanoi, Vietnam	Cambodia	1–0	3–1	2026 ASEAN Championship
8	7 August 2026	Mỹ Đình National Stadium, Hanoi, Vietnam	Cambodia	3–1	3–1	2026 ASEAN Championship
9	26 September 2026	Si Jalak Harupat Stadium, Bandung, Indonesia	Philippines	1–0	1–0	2026 FIFA ASEAN Cup
10	2 October 2026	Gelora Bung Karno Stadium, Jakarta, Indoneia	Pakistan	3–1	4–2	2026 FIFA ASEAN Cup
11	11 November 2026	Thiên Trường Stadium, Ninh Bình, Vietnam	Chinese Taipei	2–0	2–0	2026 Casper Cup
12	17 November 2026	Thiên Trường Stadium, Ninh Bình, Vietnam	Kyrgyzstan	1–0	1–2	2026 Casper Cup

== Honours ==
Quảng Nam

- V.League 2: 2023

Công An Hà Nội

- V.League 1: 2025–26
- Vietnamese National Cup: 2024–25
- Vietnamese Super Cup: 2025
- ASEAN Club Championship runner-up: 2024-2025

Vietnam U19

- International Thanh Niên Newspaper Cup: 2022

Vietnam U23

- ASEAN U-23 Championship: 2025
- SEA Games gold medal: 2025
- AFC U-23 Asian Cup third place: 2026

Vietnam

- ASEAN Championship: 2026

Individual

- V.League 2 Player of the Year: 2023
- ASEAN U-23 Championship Most Valuable Player: 2025
- AFC U-23 Asian Cup Top goalscorer: 2026
- V.League 1 Team of the Season: 2025–26
- V.League 1 Best Young Player of the Season: 2025–26
- ASEAN Championship Most Valuable Player: 2026
- ASEAN Championship Top goalscorer: 2026
