= Yotsakorn Burapha =

Thai footballer (born 2005)

Personal information
- Full name: Yotsakorn Burapha
- Date of birth: 8 June 2005 (age 21)
- Place of birth: Chanthaburi, Thailand
- Height: 1.84 m (6 ft 0 in)
- Position: Striker

Team information
- Current team: Chonburi
- Number: 8

Youth career
- 2016–2018: Navy
- 2019–2022: Chonburi

Senior career*
Years	Team	Apps	(Gls)
2022–	Chonburi	64	(15)
2022–2023	→ Samut Prakan City (loan)	32	(7)
2025	→ PT Prachuap (loan)	5	(1)
2025	→ Hougang United (loan)	5	(1)

International career^{‡}
2025	Thailand U20	3	(1)
2023–	Thailand U23	16	(9)
2023–	Thailand	10	(6)
Medal record
Thailand
SEA Games
Silver medal – second place	2023 Cambodia	Team
Silver medal – second place	2025 Thailand	Team
ASEAN Championship
Runner-up	Hyundai Cup 2026	Team
- * Club domestic league appearances and goals ‡ National team caps and goals as of 14 November 2026

Yotsakorn Burapha (Thai: ยศกร บูรพา, born 8 June 2005) is a Thai professional footballer who plays primarily as a striker for Thai League 1 club Chonburi and the Thailand national team.

== International career ==
=== Youth ===
In July 2025, Yotsakorn was called up to the Thailand U23 squad for the 2025 ASEAN U-23 Championship. In September 2025, he was then called up against to Thailand U23 squad for the 2026 AFC U-23 Asian Cup qualification.

=== Senior ===
Yotsakorn made his Thailand national team debut on 12 October 2023 in a friendly match against Georgia. In the 8–0 defeat, he was substituted for Purachet Thodsanit after half-time.

Yotsakorn scored his first international goal during the 2026 ASEAN Championship fixtures against Laos in a 5–0 thrashing win on 25 July 2026. He was awarded best young player of the tournament.

== Career statistics ==
=== Club ===
As of match played 30 May 2025.

Appearances and goals by club, season and competition
Club	Season	League			Cup		Continental		Other		Total	
Club	Season	Division	Apps	Goals	Apps	Goals	Apps	Goals	Apps	Goals	Apps	Goals
Samut Prakan City	2022–23	Thai League 2	31	7	1	0	—		—		32	7
Chonburi	2023–24	Thai League 1	26	4	4	0	0	0	0	0	30	4
Chonburi	2024–25	Thai League 2	15	2	0	0	0	0	0	0	15	2
Chonburi	Total		41	6	4	0	0	0	0	0	45	6
PT Prachuap (loan)	2024–25	Thai League 1	5	1	0	0	0	0	0	0	5	1
Career total			77	14	5	0	0	0	0	0	82	14

=== International goals ===
Scores and results list Thailand's goal tally first.

No.	Date	Venue	Opponent	Score	Result	Competition
1.	25 July 2026	New Laos National Stadium, Vientiane, Laos	Laos	3–0	5–0	2026 ASEAN Championship
2.	1 August 2026	Rajamangala Stadium, Bangkok, Thailand	Malaysia	1–0	2–0	2026 ASEAN Championship
3.	26 August 2026	Mỹ Đình National Stadium, Hanoi, Vietnam	Vietnam	1–0	2–2	2026 ASEAN Championship
4.	14 November 2026	Sisaket Province Stadium, Sisaket, Thailand	Brunei	3–0	6–0	2026 King's Cup
5.	14 November 2026	Sisaket Province Stadium, Sisaket, Thailand	Brunei	5–0	6–0	2026 King's Cup
6.	14 November 2026	Sisaket Province Stadium, Sisaket, Thailand	Brunei	6–0	6–0	2026 King's Cup

== Honours ==
=== Club ===
Chonburi

- Thai League 2: 2024–25

=== International ===
Thailand

- ASEAN Championship runner-up: 2026
- King's Cup: 2026

Thailand U23

- Southeast Asian Games (silver) Silver medal: 2023, 2025

=== Individual ===
- Southeast Asian Games Top scorer: 2025
- Thai League 1 Young Player of the Year: 2025–26
- ASEAN Championship best young player: 2026
