= Football at the 2025 SEA Games – Men's tournament =

2025 Men's SEA Games Football Tournament

Tournament details
- Host country: Thailand
- Dates: 3–18 December
- Teams: 9 (from 9 associations)
- Venues: 2 (in 2 host cities)

Final positions
- Champions: Vietnam (4th title)
- Runners-up: Thailand
- Third place: Malaysia
- Fourth place: Philippines

Tournament statistics
- Matches played: 13
- Goals scored: 42 (3.23 per match)
- Top scorer(s): (Thailand) Yotsakorn Burapha (7 goals)

The men's football tournament at the 2025 SEA Games (Thai: การแข่งขันฟุตบอลชายซีเกมส์ 2568) was held from 3 to 18 December 2025. It was the 33rd edition of the men's SEA Games football tournament. Teams participating in the men's competition were restricted to under-22 players (born on or after 1 January 2003).

Indonesia were the defending champions, having won in 2023, but they failed to get past the group stages as they were defeated by the Philippines and failed to get the best second-placed team to advance to the semi-finals (scored one goal fewer than Malaysia), which marked the first time since 2019 that a defending champions, the first time for Indonesia's team since 2009 were eliminated in the group stage and the first time since 1993 that a defending champions (also Indonesia) failed to retain their title. The Vietnamese went on to win their third title (as unified country) and fourth title (in total) in history by defeating Thailand 3–2 in the final. For Thailand, this was the first time since 1967 that they failed to achieve a gold medal on their home soil.

== Schedule ==
The schedule is as follows.

Legend
GS	Group stage	1/2	Semi-finals	B	Bronze medal match	F	Gold medal match

Wed 3	Thu 4	Fri 5	Sat 6	Sun 7	Mon 8	Tue 9	Wed 10	Thu 11	Fri 12	Sat 13	Sun 14	Mon 15	Tue 16	Wed 17	Thu 18	
GS		GS	GS		GS			GS	GS			SF			B	F

== Venues ==
Bangkok	Football at the 2025 SEA Games – Men's tournament is located in Thailand
Rajamangala Stadium	Football at the 2025 SEA Games – Men's tournament is located in Thailand
Capacity: 51,560	Football at the 2025 SEA Games – Men's tournament is located in Thailand
Chiang Mai	Football at the 2025 SEA Games – Men's tournament is located in Thailand
700th Anniversary Stadium	Football at the 2025 SEA Games – Men's tournament is located in Thailand
Capacity: 17,909	Football at the 2025 SEA Games – Men's tournament is located in Thailand

== Squads ==
Each team had to submit a squad of 23 players, three of whom had to be goalkeepers. All players have to be born on or after 1 January 2003.

== Draw ==
The draw for the groups was held on 19 October 2025, 13:00 ICT (UTC+7). The ten teams were drawn into three groups of four or five teams each. The hosts Thailand were automatically seeded into Pot 1 and placed into the first position of Group A, while the remaining teams were seeded into their respective pots, based on their previous performance.

Originally, Timor-Leste was not included among the confirmed entrant teams. Timor-Leste alleged that they had been omitted but later apologized and was granted entry regardless.

Cambodia originally were drawn to Group A but withdrew, citing safety reasons raised by Cambodian officials. As a result, Singapore, who were originally drawn in Group C, were moved to Group A to balance out the number of teams in each group.

Pot 1	Pot 2	Pot 3
1. Thailand (H); 2. Indonesia; 3. Vietnam	4. Malaysia; 5. Myanmar; 6. Timor-Leste	7. Laos; 8. Philippines; 9. Singapore

== Group stage ==
The group winners and the best runners-up advanced to the knockout stage, which began with the semi-finals.

All times are local, ICT (UTC+7).

=== Tiebreakers ===
The ranking of teams in the group stage was determined as follows:

1. Points obtained in all group matches (three points for a win, one for a draw, none for a defeat);
2. Goal difference in all group matches;
3. Number of goals scored in all group matches;
4. Points obtained in the matches played between the teams in question;
5. Goal difference in the matches played between the teams in question;
6. Number of goals scored in the matches played between the teams in question;
7. Fair play points in all group matches (only one deduction could be applied to a player in a single match):
  - Yellow card: −1 point;
  - Indirect red card (second yellow card): −3 points;
  - Direct red card: −4 points;
  - Yellow card and direct red card: −5 points;
8. Drawing of lots.

=== Group A ===
Pos	Team	Pld	W	D	L	GF	GA	GD	Pts	Qualification
1	Thailand (H)	2	2	0	0	9	1	+8	6	Advance to knockout stage
2	Timor-Leste	2	1	0	1	4	7	−3	3	
3	Singapore	2	0	0	2	1	6	−5	0	

Source: Soccerway
Rules for classification: Group stage tiebreakers
(H) Hosts
3 December 2025
19:00

Timor-Leste	1–6	Thailand
Palomito 90+3'	Report	Yotsakorn B. 44', 70', 72'; Siraphop 49'; Iklas 60'; Kakana 83'

Rajamangala Stadium, Bangkok (Note: Originally planned to be held in Tinsulanon Stadium, but moved to Rajamangala Stadium due to safety concerns)
Attendance: 7,741
Referee: Choi Hyun-jai (South Korea)

6 December 2025
19:00

Singapore	1–3	Timor-Leste
Amir 11'	Report	Canavaro 19'; Correia 42'; Olagar 45+1'

Rajamangala Stadium, Bangkok
Referee: Asker Nadjafaliev (Uzbekistan)

11 December 2025
19:00

Thailand	3–0	Singapore
Siraphop 49'; Yotsakorn B. 51', 55'	Report

Rajamangala Stadium, Bangkok
Attendance: 7,896
Referee: Mooud Bonyadifard (Iran)

=== Group B ===
Pos	Team	Pld	W	D	L	GF	GA	GD	Pts	Qualification
1	Vietnam	2	2	0	0	4	1	+3	6	Advance to knockout stage
2	Malaysia	2	1	0	1	4	3	+1	3	Advance to knockout stage
3	Laos	2	0	0	2	2	6	−4	0	

Source: Soccerway
Rules for classification: Group stage tiebreakers
3 December 2025
16:00

Laos	1–2	Vietnam
Khampane 33'	Report	Nguyễn Đình Bắc 28', 60'

Rajamangala Stadium, Bangkok (Note: Originally planned to be held in Tinsulanon Stadium, but moved to Rajamangala Stadium due to Cyclone Senyar hitting Songkhla province.)
Referee: Rustam Lutfullin (Uzbekistan)

6 December 2025
16:00

Malaysia	4–1	Laos
Haykal 33'; Haqimi 59'; Moses 62'; Muhammad 90'	Report	Bounphaeng 4'

Rajamangala Stadium, Bangkok
Referee: Payam Heydari (Iran)

11 December 2025
16:00

Vietnam	2–0	Malaysia
Nguyễn Hiểu Minh 11'; Phạm Minh Phúc 22'	Report

Rajamangala Stadium, Bangkok
Referee: Qasim Al-Hatmi (Oman)

=== Group C ===
Pos	Team	Pld	W	D	L	GF	GA	GD	Pts	Qualification
1	Philippines	2	2	0	0	3	0	+3	6	Advance to knockout stage
2	Indonesia	2	1	0	1	3	2	+1	3	
3	Myanmar	2	0	0	2	1	5	−4	0	

Source: Soccerway
Rules for classification: Group stage tiebreakers
5 December 2025
18:00

Myanmar	0–2	Philippines
	Report	Monis 19'; Latt Wai Phone 50' (o.g.)

700th Anniversary Stadium, Chiang Mai
Referee: Sadullo Gulmurodi (Tajikstan)

8 December 2025
18:00

Philippines	1–0	Indonesia
Banatao 45+2'	Report

700th Anniversary Stadium, Chiang Mai
Referee: Adel Al-Naqbi (United Arab Emirates)

12 December 2025
18:00

Indonesia	3–1	Myanmar
Toni 45'; Raven 89', 90+5'	Report	Min Maw Oo 29'

700th Anniversary Stadium, Chiang Mai
Referee: Ammar Mahfoodh (Bahrain)

=== Ranking of second-placed teams ===
Only the best second-placed team will advance to the semi-finals.

Pos	Grp	Team	Pld	W	D	L	GF	GA	GD	Pts	Qualification
1	B	Malaysia	2	1	0	1	4	3	+1	3	Advance to knockout stage
2	C	Indonesia	2	1	0	1	3	2	+1	3	
3	A	Timor-Leste	2	1	0	1	4	7	−3	3	

Source: Soccerway
Rules for classification: 1) Points; 2) Goal difference; 3) Goals scored; 4) Wins; 5) Lower disciplinary points total; 6) Drawing of lots.

== Knockout stage ==
In the knockout stage, if a match was level at the end of normal playing time, extra time was played (two periods of 15 minutes each) and followed, if necessary, by a penalty shoot-out to determine the winner.

=== Bracket ===
Semi-finals
15 December – Bangkok
Thailand	1
Malaysia	0
15 December – Bangkok
Vietnam	2
Philippines	0

Gold medal match
18 December – Bangkok
Thailand	2
Vietnam (a.e.t.)	3
Bronze medal match
18 December – Bangkok
Philippines	1
Malaysia	2

=== Semi-finals ===
15 December 2025
15:30

Vietnam	2–0	Philippines
Lê Văn Thuận 89'; Nguyễn Thanh Nhàn 90+2'	Report

Rajamangala Stadium, Bangkok
Referee: Choi Hyun-jai (South Korea)

15 December 2025
20:00

Thailand	1–0	Malaysia
Yotsakorn B. 8'	Report

Rajamangala Stadium, Bangkok
Attendance: 19,659
Referee: Rustam Lutfullin (Uzbekistan)

=== Bronze medal match ===
18 December 2025
15:30

Philippines	1–2	Malaysia
Haqimi 36' (o.g.)	Report	Danish 28'; Haqimi 43'

Rajamangala Stadium, Bangkok
Attendance: 1,325
Referee: Qasim Al-Hatmi (Oman)

=== Gold medal match ===
18 December 2025
19:30

Thailand	2–3 (a.e.t.)	Vietnam
Yotsakorn B. 20'; Seksan 31'	Report	Nguyễn Đình Bắc 49' (pen.); Waris 60' (o.g.); Nguyễn Thanh Nhàn 96'

Rajamangala Stadium, Bangkok
Attendance: 17,736
Referee: Mooud Bonyadifard (Iran)

== Statistics ==
=== Goalscorers ===
There were 42 goals scored in 13 matches, for an average of 3.23 goals per match.

7 goals

- (Thailand) Yotsakorn Burapha

3 goals

- (Vietnam) Nguyễn Đình Bắc

2 goals

- (Thailand) Siraphop Wandee
- (Malaysia) Haqimi Azim
- (Indonesia) Jens Raven
- (Vietnam) Nguyễn Thanh Nhàn

1 goal

- (Laos) Bounphaeng Xaysombath
- (Laos) Khampane Douangvilay
- (Malaysia) Haykal Danish
- (Malaysia) Moses Raj
- (Malaysia) Muhammad Abu Khalil
- (Philippines) Alex Monis
- (Philippines) Otu Banatao
- (Singapore) Amir Syafiz
- (Thailand) Iklas Sanron
- (Thailand) Kakana Khamyok
- (Thailand) Seksan Ratree
- (Timor-Leste) Anizo Correia
- (Timor-Leste) Olagar Xavier
- (Timor-Leste) Palomito Ribeiro
- (Timor-Leste) Vabio Cannavaro
- (Vietnam) Nguyễn Hiểu Minh
- (Vietnam) Phạm Minh Phúc
- (Vietnam) Lê Văn Thuận
- (Indonesia) Toni Firmansyah
- (Myanmar) Min Maw Oo

1 own goal

- (Malaysia) Haqimi Azim (against Philippines)
- (Myanmar) Latt Wai Phone (against Philippines)
- (Thailand) Waris Choolthong (against Vietnam)

== Final ranking ==
As per statistical convention in football, matches decided in extra time are counted as wins and losses, while matches decided by penalty shoot-outs are counted as draws.

Pos	Team	Pld	W	D	L	GF	GA	GD	Pts	Final result
1st place, gold medalist(s)	Vietnam	4	4	0	0	9	3	+6	12	Gold medal
2nd place, silver medalist(s)	Thailand	4	3	0	1	12	4	+8	9	Silver medal
3rd place, bronze medalist(s)	Malaysia	4	2	0	2	6	5	+1	6	Bronze medal
4	Philippines	4	2	0	2	4	4	0	6	Fourth place
5	Indonesia	2	1	0	1	3	2	+1	3	Eliminated in group stage
6	Timor-Leste	2	1	0	1	4	7	−3	3	Eliminated in group stage
7	Laos	2	0	0	2	2	6	−4	0	Eliminated in group stage
8	Myanmar	2	0	0	2	1	5	−4	0	Eliminated in group stage
9	Singapore	2	0	0	2	1	6	−5	0	Eliminated in group stage

== See also ==
- Football at the 2025 SEA Games – Women's tournament
