= Nguyễn Thanh Nhàn =

Vietnamese footballer (born 2003)

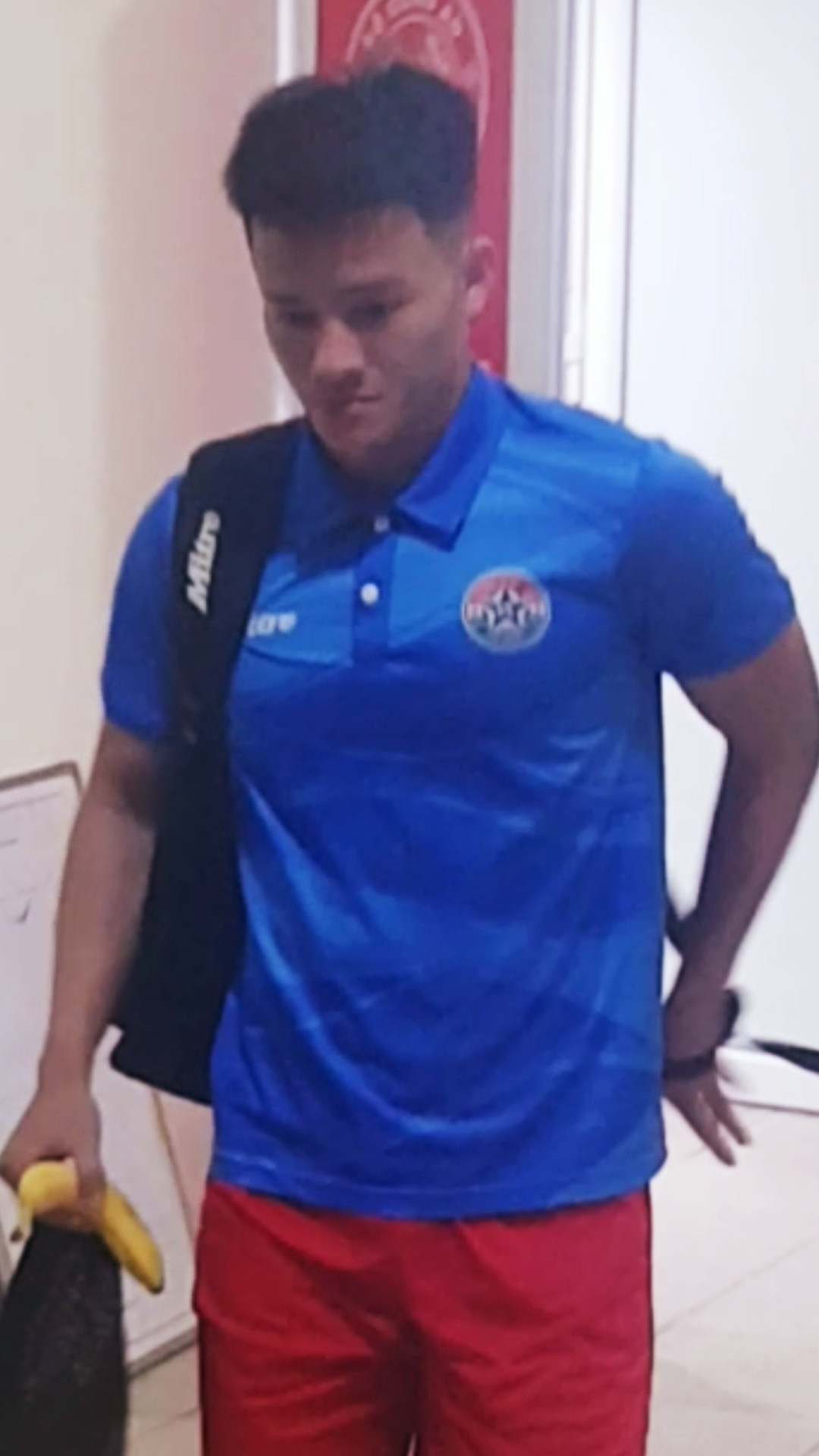
- Thanh Nhàn in 2024

Personal information
- Full name: Nguyễn Thanh Nhàn
- Date of birth: 28 July 2003 (age 23)
- Place of birth: Tân Biên, Tây Ninh, Vietnam
- Height: 1.73 m (5 ft 8 in)
- Positions: Winger; forward

Team information
- Current team: Công An Nhân Dân
- Number: 11

Youth career
- 2014–2019: Tây Ninh
- 2019–2022: PVF

Senior career*
Years	Team	Apps	(Gls)
2022–	Công An Nhân Dân	95	(33)

International career^{‡}
2022–2023	Vietnam U20	7	(1)
2023–2026	Vietnam U23	37	(6)
2023–	Vietnam	5	(0)
Medal record
Men's football
Representing Vietnam
SEA Games
Bronze medal – third place	Phnom Penh 2023	Team
Gold medal – first place	Bangkok 2025	Team
AFC U-23 Asian Cup
Third place	Saudi Arabia 2026
- * Club domestic league appearances and goals as of 31 October 2026 ‡ National team caps and goals as of 17 November 2026

Nguyễn Thanh Nhàn (born 28 July 2003) is a Vietnamese professional footballer who plays as a winger or a forward for V.League 2 club Công An Nhân Dân and the Vietnam national team.

== Early career ==
Born in Tây Ninh, Thanh Nhàn started his youth career by participating in local youth football tournaments. His talent quickly impressed the local football managers, who advised him to take part in the admission test of youth football academies. Although in 2013 Thanh Nhàn was admitted to PVF Football Academy, he couldn't join the academy for personal reasons. In 2014, he joined Tây Ninh youth academy. His performances during the 2019 Vietnamese National U-17 Football Championship caught the attention of Vietnam U19 manager Philippe Troussier. PVF Football Academy signed Thanh Nhàn under Troussier's demand. Thanh Nhàn won two consecutives Vietnamese National U-19 Football Championships with PVF and was named as best player in the 2021 edition with seven goals scored.

== Club career ==
In 2022, Thanh Nhàn was promoted to PVF Football Academy's first team Phố Hiến. In his first season with club, Thanh Nhàn became a crucial starter and scored 10 goals after 20 matches in V.League 2, making him the league top scorer and helping the club finish third in the league.

In the 2023 season, Thanh Nhàn continued to be in form with his team despite missing the beginning of the season due an injury. He scored two goals in the 2023 Vietnamese Cup to help PVF-CAND reaching the semi finals for the first time in the history before getting eliminated by Đống Á Thanh Hóa. In V.League 2, Thanh Nhàn bagged 10 goals like the previous season and finished as the top scorer for the second season in a row, as PVF-CAND ended up the season as the league's runner-up.

In the following season, Thanh Nhàn missed out several games due to injury, but manage to contribute 4 goals in PVF-CAND's runner-up campaign in the 2023–24 V.League 2. He was therefore named in the league's Team of the season.

== International career ==
=== Youth ===
Thanh Nhàn participated in the 2023 AFC U-20 Championship. He played in all three group stage matches but Vietnam under-20 failed to reach the quarter-finals despite having won two out of their three matches. At the same year, Thanh Nhàn was named on Vietnam U22 squad for the 2023 SEA Games.

In 2025, Thanh Nhàn scored the winning goal in the 2025 SEA Games final against host team Thailand, thus help Vietnam win their 3rd-ever Gold medal in SEA Games men's football event.

=== Senior ===
On 21 November 2023, Thanh Nhàn made his debut with the Vietnam national team in a 2026 FIFA World Cup qualification against Iraq. In December, he was named by coach Philippe Troussier in the preliminary squad for the 2023 AFC Asian Cup but later withdrew due to an injury.

== Playing style ==
Thanh Nhàn is a versatile attacker who plays as a winger as well as a forward. He was called "Pace King" and "Lungless Man" by the Vietnamese press, referring to his accelerations, his stamina and workrates in the field when frequently switching positions during the game.

== Career statistics ==
=== Club ===
As of match played 31 October 2026

Appearances and goals by club, season and competition
Club	Season	League			Cup		Other		Total	
Club	Season	Division	Apps	Goals	Apps	Goals	Apps	Goals	Apps	Goals
Công An Nhân Dân	2022	V.League 2	20	10	0	0	—		20	10
Công An Nhân Dân	2023	V.League 2	11	10	4	2	—		15	12
Công An Nhân Dân	2023–24	V.League 2	15	4	1	1	1 (Note: Appearances in V.League 1 promotion/relegation play-offs)	0	17	5
Công An Nhân Dân	2024–25	V.League 2	18	5	1	0	—		19	5
Công An Nhân Dân	2025–26	V.League 1	25	3	1	0	1	0	27	3
Công An Nhân Dân	2026–27	V.League 2	6	1	1	0	—		7	1
Total career			95	33	8	3	2	0	105	36

=== International ===
As of match played 17 November 2026

Appearances and goals by national team and year
National team	Year	Apps	Goals
Vietnam	2023	1	0
Vietnam	2025	2	0
Vietnam	2026	2	0
Total		5	0

== Honours ==
Vietnam U23

- SEA Games gold medal: 2025; bronze medal: 2023
- AFC U-23 Asian Cup third place: 2026

=== Individual ===
- Vietnamese National U-19 Football Championship best player: 2021
- V.League 2 top scorer: 2022, 2023
- V.League 2 Team of the Season: 2023–24, 2024–25
