= Mooud Bonyadifard =

Iranian football referee (born 1985)

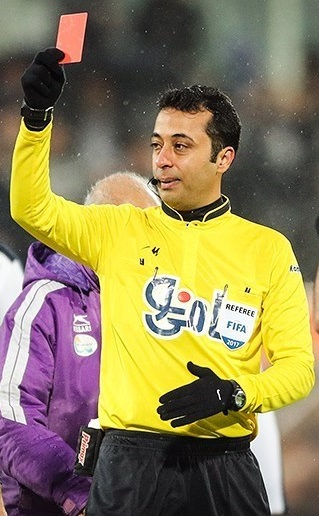
- Born: 8 September 1985 (age 41); Shahr-e Kord, Iran
- Other occupation: The former Director General of Sports and Youth of Chaharmahal and Bakhtiari Province

Domestic
Years	League	Role
2011–	Persian Gulf Pro League	Referee

International
Years	League	Role
2013–	FIFA listed	Referee

Mooud Bonyadifard (Persian: موعود بنیادی فرد ; born 8 September 1985) is an Iranian international football referee.

In 2011, he began his career by refereeing matches within the Persian Gulf Pro League, and in 2013, he became a FIFA listed referee.

== Matches ==
=== AFC Asian Cup ===
2023 AFC Asian Cup – Qatar
Date	Match	Venue	Round
21 January 2024	Oman – Thailand	Doha	Group stage

=== AFC U-23 Asian Cup ===
2024 AFC U–23 Asian Cup – Qatar
Date	Match	Venue	Round
20 April 2024	Malaysia – Vietnam	Al Rayyan	Group Stage
3 May 2024	Japan – Uzbekistan	Al Rayyan	Final Match
