= Nguyễn Hiểu Minh =

Vietnamese footballer

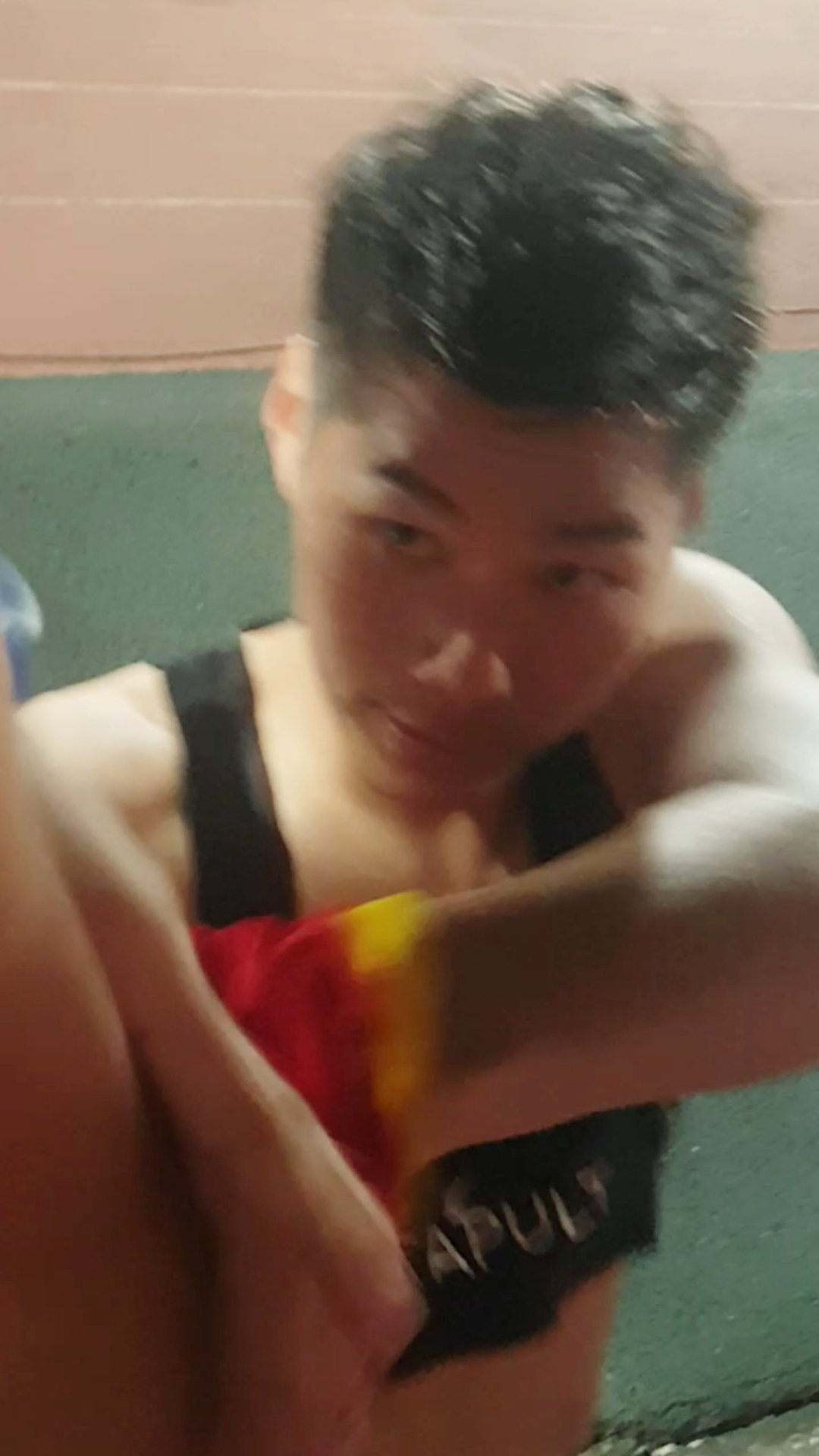
- Hiểu Minh in 2024

Personal information
- Full name: Nguyễn Hiểu Minh
- Date of birth: 5 August 2004 (age 22)
- Place of birth: Thạch Thất, Hà Tây, Vietnam
- Height: 1.84 m (6 ft 0 in)
- Position: Center-back

Team information
- Current team: Công An Nhân Dân
- Number: 4

Youth career
- 2013–2022: PVF

Senior career*
Years	Team	Apps	(Gls)
2022–	Công An Nhân Dân	66	(2)

International career^{‡}
2022–2024	Vietnam U20	3	(0)
2024–2026	Vietnam U23	24	(5)
2025–	Vietnam	1	(0)
Medal record
Men's football
Representing Vietnam
AFC U-23 Asian Cup
Third place	Saudi Arabia 2026
ASEAN U-23 Championship
Winner	Indonesia 2025
SEA Games
Gold medal – first place	Bangkok 2025
- * Club domestic league appearances and goals as of 21 March 2026 ‡ National team caps and goals as of 20 January 2026

Nguyễn Hiểu Minh (born 5 August 2004) is a Vietnamese professional footballer who plays as a center-back for V.League 2 club Công An Nhân Dân.

== Club career ==
Born in Hà Tây (a part of Hanoi today), Hiểu Minh traveled to Ho Chi Minh City at the age of 9 to participate in PVF Football Academy's entry test. He was later admitted to the team. He was part of the PVF U-19 team that won the Vietnamese U-19 Championship.

In 2022, he was promoted to PVF's first team and made his V.League 2 debut on 12 April 2022, starting in his team's 1–1 draw against Phú Thọ. This made him the youngest player to ever appear in an official match for PVF-CAND. He scored his first career goal on 23 July in his team's 3–0 victory against Huế.

At the end of the 2024–25 season, after establishing himself as the leader in PVF-CAND's defense, Hiểu Minh was named in the V.League 2's Team of the Season and was named as the league's Best Young Player of the Season.

== International career ==
In July 2025, Hiểu Minh featured in Vietnam U23's squad for the 2025 ASEAN U-23 Championship. In the opening game against Laos, he scored two goals in the 3–0 win.

On 14 October 2025, Hiểu Minh had his first match for the Vietnam national team, the match against Nepal in the third qualifying round of 2027 AFC Asian Cup qualification.

On 21 January 2026 during the semi-final match against China in the 2026 AFC U-23 Asian Cup, Hiểu Minh broke his knee ligaments after being tackled by Xiang Yuwang. He will have to take 6 to 9 months of absence during recovery.

== Career statistics ==
=== Club ===
As of match played 21 March 2026

Appearances and goals by club, season and competition
Club	Season	League			Cup		Other		Total	
Club	Season	Division	Apps	Goals	Apps	Goals	Apps	Goals	Apps	Goals
Công An Nhân Dân	2022	V.League 2	18	1	1	0	—		19	1
Công An Nhân Dân	2023	V.League 2	5	0	3	0	—		8	0
Công An Nhân Dân	2023-24	V.League 2	14	1	2	1	1 (Note: Appearance in the V.League 1 promotion/relegation play-offs)	1	17	3
Công An Nhân Dân	2024-25	V.League 2	18	0	2	0	—		20	0
Công An Nhân Dân	2025-26	V.League 1	11	0	0	0	0	0	11	0
Total career			66	2	8	1	1	1	75	4

=== International ===
As of match played 14 October 2025

Appearances and goals by national team and year
National team	Year	Apps	Goals
Vietnam	2025	1	0
Total		1	0

== Honours ==
Vietnam U23

- ASEAN U-23 Championship: 2025
- SEA Games gold medal: 2025
- AFC U-23 Asian Cup third place: 2026

Individual

- V.League 2 Team of the Season: 2024–25
- V.League 2 Young player of the Season: 2024–25
