= 2022–23 in Indonesian football =

Football in Indonesia
- Season: 2022

Men's football
- Liga 1: Bali United
- Liga 2: Persis
- Liga 3: Karo United

The 2022 season of competitive association football in Indonesia.

== Promotion and relegation ==
League	Promoted to league	Relegated from league
Liga 1	Persis; RANS Nusantara; Dewa United	Persipura; Persela; Persiraja
Liga 2	Karo United; Putra Delta Sidoarjo; PSDS; Nusantara United (replacing Mataram Utama); Deltras; Persikab; Persipa; Gresik United; Persipal (via acquisition of Muba Babel United)	Tiga Naga; Badak Lampung; Hizbul Wathan; Mitra Kukar

=== Name changes ===
On 30 May 2022, during the 2022 PSSI Ordinary Congress, six teams had their name change requests accepted by the federation:

==== Liga 1 ====
- Dewa United removed "Martapura" from its official name, having previously acquired Martapura to play in Liga 2 last season.
- Borneo added their home city of "Samarinda" to their full name, thus becoming Borneo Samarinda.
- TIRA-Persikabo officially changed its name to Persikabo 1973, even though the name was already used for the last season as a commercial arrangement.
- RANS Cilegon changed its name to RANS Nusantara and moved their homebase to Jakarta.

==== Liga 2 ====
- AHHA PS Pati relocated to Bekasi and were renamed to Bekasi FC However, following a lawsuit by Bekasi FC's original rights holder, the club is subject to another name change, which will be decided in the near future.
- Mataram Utama handed over their senior team to a group of investors, who subsequently rebranded the club as Nusantara United. The two clubs exist as separate entities, with Nusantara United taking over Mataram Utama's place in the Liga 2, while Mataram Utama redirected their focus towards youth development and their football academy. On 5 July, revealed that they are now based in Nusantara, the planned new capital of Indonesia.

==== Club acquisition ====
- Muba Babel United was acquired by Liga 3 side Persipal Palu. As a result, Persipal took over Muba Babel United's place in Liga 2 starting from the 2022-23 season.

== Domestic leagues ==
After the Kanjuruhan Stadium disaster, where at least 135 people died in a stampede triggered by police usage of tear gas on supporters who were still inside the stadium, Liga 1, Liga 2, and Liga 3 were put on hold. On 6 October 2022, Indonesian police announced six accused, three league related operator and three police officers. The accused operators are: director of PT Liga Indonesia Baru Ahmad Hadi Lukita, Arema match organising committee chairman Abdul Haris, and Arema head of security officer Suko Sutrisno.

=== Liga 1 ===
The 2022–23 Liga 1 season (also known as the 2022–23 BRI Liga 1 season for sponsorship reasons) was the 13th season of the Liga 1, the top Indonesian professional league for association football clubs since its establishment in 2008. The season started on 23 July 2022, with the first match between PSIS and RANS Nusantara which ended draw. Bali United were the two-time defending champions.

== National teams ==
=== Men's national football team ===
27 January 2022 Int'l Friendly	Indonesia	4–1	Timor-Leste	Gianyar, Indonesia
20:00 UTC+8	Kambuaya 65'; Arhan 73' (pen.); Mendonca 76' (o.g.); Filomeno 80' (o.g.)	Report	Freitas 35'	Stadium: Kapten I Wayan Dipta Stadium; Referee: Sance Lawita (Indonesia)

30 January 2022 Int'l Friendly	Timor-Leste	0–3	Indonesia	Gianyar, Indonesia
20:00 UTC+8		Report	Puhiri 5'; Rumakiek 41'; Kambuaya 72'	Stadium: Kapten I Wayan Dipta Stadium; Referee: Aprisman Aranda (Indonesia)

1 June 2022 Int'l Friendly	Indonesia	0–0	Bangladesh	Soreang, Indonesia
20:30 UTC+7		Report		Stadium: Jalak Harupat Stadium; Attendance: 8,615; Referee: Yudi Nurcahya (Indonesia)

24 September 2022 Int'l Friendly	Indonesia	3–2	Curaçao	Bandung, Indonesia
20:00 UTC+7	Klok 18'; Fachruddin 22'; Dimas 56'	Report	Janga 8'; J. Bacuna 25'	Stadium: Gelora Bandung Lautan Api Stadium; Attendance: 7,095; Referee: Abdul Hakim Mohd Haidi (Brunei)

27 September 2022 Int'l Friendly	Curaçao	1–2	Indonesia	Cibinong, Indonesia
20:00 UTC+7	Antonisse 47'	Report	Dimas 3'; Dendy 87'	Stadium: Pakansari Stadium; Attendance: 21,819; Referee: Xaypaseuth Pongsanit (Laos)

==== 2020 AFF Championship ====
1 January 2022 Finals	Thailand	2–2	Indonesia	Kallang, Singapore
20:30 UTC+8	Adisak 54'; Sarach 56'	Report (AFFSZ); Report (AFF)	Kambuaya 7'; Egy 80'	Stadium: National Stadium; Attendance: 7,429; Referee: Ahmed Faisal Al-Ali (Jordan)

==== 2023 AFC Asian Cup qualification ====
8 June 2022 Group A	Kuwait	1–2	Indonesia	Kuwait City, Kuwait
19:15 UTC+3	Nasser 41'	Report	Klok 44' (pen.); Irianto 46'	Stadium: Jaber Al-Ahmad International Stadium; Attendance: 6,100; Referee: Nasrullo Kabirov (Tajikistan)

11 June 2022 Group A	Indonesia	0–1	Jordan	Kuwait City, Kuwait
23:15 UTC+3		Report	Al-Naimat 48'	Stadium: Jaber Al-Ahmad International Stadium; Referee: Yaqoob Abdul Baki (Oman)

14 June 2022 Group A	Indonesia	7–0	Nepal	Kuwait City, Kuwait
23:15 UTC+3	Dimas 6'; Witan 43', 81'; Fachruddin 54'; Saddil 55'; Baggott 80'; Marselino 90'	Report		Stadium: Jaber Al-Ahmad International Stadium; Attendance: 3,145; Referee: Hussein Abo Yehia (Lebanon)

==== 2022 AFF Championship ====
23 December 2022 Group A	Indonesia	2–1	Cambodia	Jakarta, Indonesia
16:30 UTC+7	Egy 7'; Witan 35'	Report (AFFMEC); Report (AFF)	Krya 16'	Stadium: Gelora Bung Karno Stadium; Attendance: 25,332; Referee: Ryuji Sato (Japan)

26 December 2022 Group A	Brunei	0–7	Indonesia	Kuala Lumpur, Malaysia
18:00 UTC+8		Report (AFFMEC); Report (AFF)	Syahrian 20'; Dendy 41'; Egy 59'; Spasojević 60'; Ramadhan 68'; Klok 86'; Sayuri 90+2'	Stadium: Kuala Lumpur Stadium; Attendance: 5,439; Referee: Kim Hee-gon (South Korea)

29 December 2022 Group A	Indonesia	1–1	Thailand	Jakarta, Indonesia
16:30 UTC+7	Klok 50' (pen.)	Report (AFFMEC); Report (AFF)	Sarach 79'	Stadium: Gelora Bung Karno Stadium; Attendance: 49,985; Referee: Mohammed Al Hoish (Saudi Arabia)

=== Men's under-23 football team ===
21 April 2022 Friendly	Indonesia	4–2	(South Korea) Andong Science College	Yeongdeok, South Korea
15:30 UTC+9	Irfan 7'; Ridwan 21' (pen.); Ronaldo 88'; Jauhari 90+3'	Report	Goal	Stadium: Haemaji Football Field

23 April 2022 Friendly	Indonesia	0–2	(South Korea) Pohang Steelers	Pohang, South Korea
15:30 UTC+9			Goal	Stadium: Pohang Steel Yard

27 April 2022 Friendly	Indonesia	2–3	(South Korea) Daejeon Hana Citizen	Daejeon, South Korea
15:30 UTC+9	Kambuaya 33'; Irfan 76'		Goal	Stadium: Daejeon World Cup Stadium

==== 2022 AFF U-23 Championship ====
Indonesia withdrew from the tournament on 11 February 2022 because seven players tested positive for COVID-19, four others were categorised as suspected COVID-19 cases and three players suffered injuries.

15 February 2022 Group B	Indonesia	Cancelled	Laos	Phnom Penh, Cambodia
15:30 UTC+7				Stadium: Prince Stadium

18 February 2022 Group B	Myanmar	Cancelled	Indonesia	Phnom Penh, Cambodia
19:00 UTC+7				Stadium: Prince Stadium

21 February 2022 Group B	Indonesia	Cancelled	Malaysia	Phnom Penh, Cambodia
19:00 UTC+7				Stadium: Morodok Techo National Stadium

==== 2021 Southeast Asian Games ====
6 May 2022 Group A	Vietnam	3–0	Indonesia	Phú Thọ, Vietnam
19:00 UTC+7	Nguyễn Tiến Linh 55'; Đỗ Hùng Dũng 74'; Lê Văn Đô 88'	Report		Stadium: Việt Trì Stadium; Attendance: 16,188; Referee: Choi Hyun Jai (South Korea)

10 May 2022 Group A	Indonesia	4–1	Timor-Leste	Phú Thọ, Vietnam
19:00 UTC+7	Egy 16'; Witan 52', 77'; Fachruddin 59'	Report	Mouzinho 69'	Stadium: Việt Trì Stadium; Attendance: 6,003; Referee: Ammar Ashkanani (Kuwait)

13 May 2022 Group A	Philippines	0–4	Indonesia	Phú Thọ, Vietnam
16:00 UTC+7		Report	Ridwan 18'; Ridho 44'; Egy 74'; Marselino 85' (pen.)	Stadium: Việt Trì Stadium; Attendance: 2,661; Referee: Mahmood Al-Majarafi (Oman)

15 May 2022 Group A	Indonesia	3–1	Myanmar	Phú Thọ, Vietnam
16:00 UTC+7	Egy 6'; Witan 10'; Marselino 45+2'	Report	Win Naing Tun 67'	Stadium: Việt Trì Stadium; Attendance: 2,519; Referee: Mohammad Arafah (Jordan)

19 May 2022 Semi-finals	Thailand	1–0 (a.e.t.)	Indonesia	Nam Định, Vietnam
16:00 UTC+7	Weerathep 95'	Report		Stadium: Thiên Trường Stadium; Referee: Yahya Ali Al Mulla (United Arab Emirates)

22 May 2022 Bronze medal match	Malaysia	1–1 (3–4 p)	Indonesia	Hanoi, Vietnam
16:00 UTC+7	Hadi 81'	Report	Ronaldo 69'	Stadium: Mỹ Đình National Stadium; Referee: Adam Fazeel (Maldives)
	Penalties
	Hadi (penalty missed); Hairiey (penalty scored); Luqman (penalty missed); Harith (penalty scored); Mukhairi (penalty scored)		(penalty missed) Asnawi; (penalty scored) Ridwan; (penalty scored) Marselino; (penalty scored) Saddil; (penalty scored) Klok

=== Men's under-20 football team ===
22 March 2022 Friendly	Indonesia	1–5	(South Korea) Yeungnam University	Yeongdeok, South Korea
15:00 UTC+9	Goal	Report	Goal	Stadium: Yeongdeok Heimaji Arena

25 March 2022 Int'l Friendly	South Korea	7–0	Indonesia	Daegu, South Korea
15:30 UTC+9	Seungmin 20'; Seungwon 42'; Minjae 43', 45'; Seunghyeon 50'; Jaewon 77'; Dongjae 82'	Report		Stadium: DGB Daegu Bank Park

27 March 2022 Friendly	Indonesia	2–1	(South Korea) Daegu University	Daegu, South Korea
15:00 UTC+9	Kadek Arel; Kwateh	Report	Goal	Stadium: DGB Daegu Bank Park

29 March 2022 Int'l Friendly	South Korea	5–1	Indonesia	Daegu, South Korea
19:00 UTC+9	Jonghun 9', 16'; Seongjin 12'; Seongmin 80' (pen.); Seungwon 89' (pen.)	Report	Marselino 42'	Stadium: DGB Daegu Bank Park

5 April 2022 Friendly	Indonesia	2–2	(South Korea) Gimcheon Sangmu U18s	Daegu, South Korea
14:30 UTC+9	Subhan 37'; Asrul 67'	Report	43'; 87'	Stadium: Riverside Soccer Field

6 April 2022 Friendly	Indonesia	2–0	(South Korea) Pohang Steelers U18s	Daegu, South Korea
15:00 UTC+9	Kwateh; Fachrezi	Report		Stadium: Riverside Soccer Field

7 April 2022 Friendly	Indonesia	2–1	(South Korea) Kyungil University	Daegu, South Korea
15:00 UTC+9	Arsa 38'; Fachrezi 81' (pen.)	Report	Gyeong Il Uni 90+1'	Stadium: Riverside Soccer Field

9 April 2022 Friendly	Indonesia	1–5	(South Korea) Pohang Steelers	Daegu, South Korea
15:00 UTC+9	Marselino	Report	Goal	Stadium: Gyeongsan Stadium

13 April 2022 Friendly	Indonesia	1–3	(South Korea) Yeungnam University	Daegu, South Korea
15:00 UTC+9	Goal	Report	Goal	Stadium: Riverside Soccer Field

24 October 2022 Friendly	Indonesia	2–1	(Turkey) Cakallikli Spor	Antalya, Turkey
	Ginanjar 17'; Pratama 85'	Report	Goal	Stadium: Kempinski Hotel Football Field

26 October 2022 Int'l Friendly	Turkey	2–1	Indonesia	Manavgat, Turkey
16:00 UTC+3	Kaygisiz 16'; Kilicsoy 78'	Report	Dony 90+1'	Stadium: Manavgat Atatürk Stadium

1 November 2022 Int'l Friendly	Indonesia	3–1	Moldova	Manavgat, Turkey
15:30 UTC+3	Rabbani 58'; Ferarri 73'; Marselino 79' (pen.)	Report	Bulmaga 6'	Stadium: Manavgat Atatürk Stadium

4 November 2022 Int'l Friendly	Moldova	0–0	Indonesia	Antalya, Turkey
15:30 UTC+3		Report		Stadium: Emirhan Sport Center

8 November 2022 Friendly	Indonesia	3–2	(Turkey) Antalyaspor U20s	Antalya, Turkey
15:00 UTC+3	Marselino 47' (pen.), 63'; Kwateh 89'	Report	Goal	Stadium: Limak Arcadia Football Center

11 November 2022 Friendly	Indonesia	3–3	(Norway) Bærum SK U20s	Antalya, Turkey
16:00 UTC+3	73' (o.g.); Zanadin 75'; Dzaky 90+3'	Report	Goal	Stadium: Hane Hotel Football Pitch

13 November 2022 Friendly	Indonesia	0–2	(Saudi Arabia) Al-Adalah	Antalya, Turkey
16:00 UTC+3		Report	Goal	Stadium: Emirhan Stadium Side

22 November 2022 Friendly	Indonesia	0–4	(Norway) Vålerenga Fotball U20s	Málaga, Spain
18:00 UTC+1		Report	Goal	Stadium: Marbella Football Center

23 November 2022 Friendly	Indonesia	0–0	(Spain) Málaga CF U19s	Málaga, Spain
18:00 UTC+1		Report		Stadium: Marbella Football Center

==== 2022 Maurice Revello Tournament ====
30 May 2022 Group B	Indonesia	0–1	Venezuela	Aubagne, France
13:30 UTC+2		Report	Pérez 69'	Stadium: Stade de Lattre-de-Tassigny; Referee: Marie-Soleil Beaudoin (Canada)

2 June 2022 Group B	Ghana	0–1	Indonesia	Vitrolles, France
17:30 UTC+2		Report	Raka 58'	Stadium: Stade Jules-Ladoumègue; Referee: Yoshimi Yamashita (Japan)

5 June 2022 Group B	Mexico	2–0	Indonesia	Aubagne, France
17:30 UTC+2	Muñoz 39' (pen.); Ruvalcaba 90+1'	Report		Stadium: Stade de Lattre-de-Tassigny; Referee: Katja Koroleva (United States)

8 June 2022 Ninth place playoff	Algeria	1–1 (4–3 p)	Indonesia	Arles, France
18:00 UTC+2	Guermouche 90+3'	Report	Rusadi 87'	Stadium: Stade Fernand-Fournier; Referee: Vincentia Amedome (Togo)
	Penalties
	Belkhir (penalty scored); Titraoui (penalty scored); Guermouche (penalty missed); Benchaa (penalty scored); Bellache (penalty scored)		(penalty missed) Fachrezi; (penalty scored) Tata; (penalty scored) Kwateh; (penalty missed) Rusadi; (penalty scored) Nico

==== 2022 AFF U-19 Youth Championship ====
2 July 2022 Group A	Vietnam	0–0	Indonesia	Bekasi, Indonesia
20:30 UTC+7		Report		Stadium: Patriot Candrabhaga Stadium; Attendance: 10,832; Referee: Razlan Joffri Ali (Malaysia)

4 July 2022 Group A	Indonesia	7–0	Brunei	Bekasi, Indonesia
20:00 UTC+7	Hokky 2', 14', 18', 45+2'; Kwateh 11'; Arkhan 20'; Nico 61'	Report		Stadium: Patriot Candrabhaga Stadium; Attendance: 4,964; Referee: Souei Vongkham (Laos)

6 July 2022 Group A	Indonesia	0–0	Thailand	Bekasi, Indonesia
20:00 UTC+7		Report		Stadium: Patriot Candrabhaga Stadium; Attendance: 17,126; Referee: Xaypasert Phongsanit (Laos)

8 July 2022 Group A	Philippines	1–5	Indonesia	Bekasi, Indonesia
20:00 UTC+7	Frias 28'	Report	Rabbani 14' (pen.), 41' (pen.), 49'; Nico 26'; Razzaa 70'	Stadium: Patriot Candrabhaga Stadium; Attendance: 10,768; Referee: Souei Vongkham (Laos)

10 July 2022 Group A	Indonesia	5–1	Myanmar	Bekasi, Indonesia
20:00 UTC+7	Ferarri 18', 32'; Arkhan 26'; Rabbani 34'; Kwateh 73'	Report	Htwe 8'	Stadium: Patriot Candrabhaga Stadium; Attendance: 18,952; Referee: Muhammad Usaid Jamal (Malaysia)

==== 2023 AFC U-20 Asian Cup qualification ====
14 September 2022 Group F	Indonesia	4–0	Timor-Leste	Surabaya, Indonesia
20:00 UTC+7	Hokky 12', 30', 49'; Rabbani 89'	Report		Stadium: Gelora Bung Tomo Stadium; Attendance: 2,207; Referee: Jansen Foo (Singapore)

16 September 2022 Group F	Hong Kong	1–5	Indonesia	Surabaya, Indonesia
20:00 UTC+7	Chen Ngo Hin 63'	Report	Rabbani 10'; Alfriyanto 15'; Zanadin 43'; Marselino 85', 90' (pen.)	Stadium: Gelora Bung Tomo Stadium; Attendance: 2,839; Referee: Rustam Lutfullin (Uzbekistan)

18 September 2022 Group F	Indonesia	3–2	Vietnam	Surabaya, Indonesia
20:00 UTC+7	Marselino 60'; Ferarri 82'; Rabbani 85'	Report	Ferarri 66' (o.g.); Đinh Xuân Tiến 79'	Stadium: Gelora Bung Tomo Stadium; Attendance: 22,165; Referee: Omar Al-Yaqoubi (Oman)

==== 2022 Costa Calida Supercup ====
17 November 2022	France	6–0	Indonesia	Murcia, Spain
18:00 UTC+1	Diouf 4'; Alexis 11'; Abline 39' (pen.), 65'; Adeline 77'; Cissé 90+2'	Report		Stadium: Pinatar Arena

19 November 2022	Slovakia	2–1	Indonesia	Murcia, Spain
12:00 UTC+1	Jambor 82' (pen.); Kachút 84'	Report	Rafael 28'	Stadium: Pinatar Arena

=== Men's under-17 football team ===
==== 2022 AFF U-16 Youth Championship ====
31 July 2022 Group A	Indonesia	2–0	Philippines	Sleman, Indonesia
20:00 UTC+7	Peña 3' (o.g.); Arkhan 37'	Report		Stadium: Maguwoharjo Stadium; Attendance: 1,439; Referee: Warinton Sassadee (Thailand)

3 August 2022 Group A	Singapore	0–9	Indonesia	Sleman, Indonesia
20:00 UTC+7		Report	Nabil 3', 18', 30'; Hanif 20'; Kafiatur 35', 43'; Riski 59'; Marifat 79' (pen.); Krisna 90+1'	Stadium: Maguwoharjo Stadium; Attendance: 1,759; Referee: Xaypaseuth Phongsanit (Laos)

6 August 2022 Group A	Indonesia	2–1	Vietnam	Sleman, Indonesia
20:00 UTC+7	Arkhan 51'; Nabil 54'	Report	Nguyễn Chong 41' (pen.)	Stadium: Maguwoharjo Stadium; Attendance: 8,000; Referee: Warinton Sassadee (Thailand)

10 August 2022 Semi-finals	Indonesia	1–1 (5–4 p)	Myanmar	Sleman, Indonesia
20:00 UTC+7	Riski 69'	Report	Nay Min Htet 44'	Stadium: Maguwoharjo Stadium; Attendance: 9,427; Referee: Abdul Hakim Mohd Haidi (Brunei)
	Penalties
	Iqbal (penalty scored); Figo (penalty scored); Arkhan (penalty scored); Riski (penalty scored); Nabil (penalty scored)		(penalty scored) Kaung Khant Zaw; (penalty scored) Brang Don Le; (penalty missed) Khon Cho Htoo; (penalty scored) Shine Wanna Aung; (penalty scored) Myat Phone Khant

12 August 2022 Final	Vietnam	0–1	Indonesia	Sleman, Indonesia
20:00 UTC+7		Report	Kafiatur 45+2'	Stadium: Maguwoharjo Stadium; Attendance: 22,579; Referee: Xaypaseuth Phongsanit (Laos)

==== 2023 AFC U-17 Asian Cup qualification ====
3 October 2022 Group B	Guam	0–14	Indonesia	Cibinong, Indonesia
20:00 UTC+7		Report	Arkhan 8', 11', 26' (pen.), 35'; Narendra 27'; Riski 32'; Zaky 45'; Moss 46' (o.g.); Jehan 48'; Gaoshirowi 58'; Habil 80'; Figo 84'; Nabil 88' (pen.); Ji Da-bin 90'	Stadium: Pakansari Stadium; Attendance: 0 (Note: All matches in Group B starting 3 October were played behind closed doors due to the Kanjuruhan Stadium disaster.); Referee: Mohammed Ahmed Al-Shammari (Qatar)

5 October 2022 Group B	Indonesia	3–2	United Arab Emirates	Cibinong, Indonesia
20:00 UTC+7	Nabil 18'; Arkhan 30', 54'	Report	Malallah 32'; Abdullah 39'	Stadium: Pakansari Stadium; Attendance: 0 Referee: Kassem Al-Hatmi (Oman)

7 October 2022 Group B	Palestine	0–2	Indonesia	Cibinong, Indonesia
20:00 UTC+7		Report	Al-Fuqaha 9' (o.g.); Habil 51'	Stadium: Pakansari Stadium; Attendance: 0 Referee: Mohammed Al-Shammari (Qatar)

9 October 2022 Group B	Indonesia	1–5	Malaysia	Cibinong, Indonesia
20:00 UTC+7	Arkhan 90+3'	Report	Zainurhakimi 17'; Arami 20', 38' (pen.); Anjasmirza 23'; Afiq 26'	Stadium: Pakansari Stadium; Attendance: 0 Referee: Song Bong-keun (South Korea)

=== Women's national football team ===
10 October 2022 Int'l Friendly	Singapore	1–2	Indonesia	Jalan Besar, Singapore
20:00 UTC+8	Nur Farhanah 86'	Report	Marsela 51'; Helsya 90+2'	Stadium: Jalan Besar Stadium; Attendance: 986

==== 2022 AFC Women's Asian Cup ====
21 January 2022 Group B	Australia	18–0	Indonesia	Mumbai, India
15:30 UTC+5:30	Kerr 9', 11', 26' (pen.), 36', 54'; Foord 14'; Fowler 17'; Raso 24', 88'; Carpenter 34', 49'; Van Egmond 39' (pen.), 57', 58', 69'; Simon 67', 71'; Luik 78'	Report (FIFA); Report (AFC)		Stadium: Mumbai Football Arena; Attendance: 0 Referee: Mahsa Ghorbani (Iran)

24 January 2022 Group B	Indonesia	0–4	Thailand	Navi Mumbai, India
17:30 UTC+5:30		Report (FIFA); Report (AFC)	Chetthabutr 27', 36', 71'; Makris 76'	Stadium: DY Patil Stadium; Attendance: 0 Referee: Yoshimi Yamashita (Japan)

27 January 2022 Group B	Philippines	6–0	Indonesia	Pune, India
19:30 UTC+5:30	Guillou 6'; Bolden 27'; Annis 56', 82'; Miclat 74'; Cesar 90+4'	Report (FIFA); Report (AFC)		Stadium: Shiv Chhatrapati Sports Complex; Attendance: 0 Referee: Kim Yu-jeong (South Korea)

==== 2021 Southeast Asian Games ====
On 15 April 2022, Indonesia announced that they will withdraw from the tournament.

9 May 2022 Group A	Vietnam	Cancelled	Indonesia	Quảng Ninh, Vietnam
--:-- UTC+7				Stadium: Cẩm Phả Stadium

11 May 2022 Group A	Cambodia	Cancelled	Indonesia	Quảng Ninh, Vietnam
--:-- UTC+7				Stadium: Cẩm Phả Stadium

14 May 2022 Group A	Indonesia	Cancelled	Philippines	Quảng Ninh, Vietnam
--:-- UTC+7				Stadium: Cẩm Phả Stadium

==== 2022 AFF Women's Championship ====
4 July 2022 Group A	Indonesia	0–4	Thailand	Biñan, Philippines
19:00 UTC+8		Report	Alisa 3', 88'; Tipkritta 10'; Sawang 69'	Stadium: Biñan Football Stadium; Attendance: 0 Referee: Công Thị Dung (Vietnam)

6 July 2022 Group A	Indonesia	1–1	Malaysia	Biñan, Philippines
19:00 UTC+8	Sheva 74'	Report	Steffi 90+2'	Stadium: Biñan Football Stadium; Referee: Plong Pichakara (Cambodia)

8 July 2022 Group A	Australia U23	4–0	Indonesia	Manila, Philippines
16:00 UTC+8	Sayer 9', 13', 15', 44'	Report		Stadium: Rizal Memorial Stadium; Referee: Aung Seinn Cho (Myanmar)

10 July 2022 Group A	Philippines	4–1	Indonesia	Manila, Philippines
19:00 UTC+8	Annis 48'; Bolden 58', 65', 67'	Report	Carla 38'	Stadium: Rizal Memorial Stadium; Attendance: 1,464; Referee: Bùi Thị Thu Trang (Vietnam)

12 July 2022 Group A	Indonesia	0–2	Singapore	Biñan, Philippines
19:00 UTC+8		Report	Izzati 45+3'; Syazwani 90+2'	Stadium: Biñan Football Stadium; Attendance: 58; Referee: Bùi Thị Thu Trang (Vietnam)

=== Women's under-20 football team ===
==== 2022 AFF U-18 Women's Championship ====
22 July 2022 Group A	Indonesia	1–0	Singapore	Palembang, Indonesia
19:30 UTC+7	Claudia 30'	Report		Stadium: Gelora Sriwijaya Stadium; Referee: Sunita Thongthawin (Thailand)

24 July 2022 Group A	Indonesia	1–0	Cambodia	Palembang, Indonesia
19:30 UTC+7	Sheva 90+2'	Report		Stadium: Gelora Sriwijaya Stadium; Attendance: 200; Referee: Bùi Thị Thu Trang (Vietnam)

26 July 2022 Group A	Vietnam	2–1	Indonesia	Palembang, Indonesia
19:30 UTC+7	Ngọc Minh Chuyên 45+3'; Nguyễn Thị Như Quỳnh 73'	Report	Awi 38'	Stadium: Gelora Sriwijaya Stadium; Attendance: 300; Referee: Supiree Testomya (Thailand)

28 July 2022 Group A	Thailand	3–0	Indonesia	Palembang, Indonesia
19:30 UTC+7	Trisutho 3', 26'; Manowong 53'	Report		Stadium: Gelora Sriwijaya Stadium; Attendance: 2,000; Referee: Bùi Thị Thu Trang (Vietnam)

=== Men's national futsal team ===
==== 2022 AFF Futsal Championship ====
3 April 2022 Group A	Brunei	0–12	Indonesia	Bangkok, Thailand
15:00 UTC+7		Report (AFF)	Soumilena 2', 3'; Pangestu 5'; Sunny 7'; Syauqi 13', 20'; Runtuboy 19', 33'; Ardiansyah N. 21'; Dewa 27', 34'; Khalil 39' (o.g.)	Stadium: Indoor Stadium Huamark; Attendance: 50; Referee: Gelareh Nazemi Deylami (Iran)

4 April 2022 Group A	Indonesia	5–1	Malaysia	Bangkok, Thailand
15:00 UTC+7	Soumilena 21', 35'; Firman 28'; Ardiansyah N. 29', 29'	Report (AFF)	Ridzwan 22'	Stadium: Indoor Stadium Huamark; Attendance: 0 Referee: Fahad Alhosani (United Arab Emirates)

5 April 2022 Group A	Indonesia	2–2	Thailand	Bangkok, Thailand
17:00 UTC+7	Soumilena 1'; Ardiansyah N. 5'	Report (AFF)	Osamanmusa 11', 35'	Stadium: Indoor Stadium Huamark; Attendance: 200; Referee: Osama Saeed Idrees (Bahrain)

6 April 2022 Group A	Cambodia	2–11	Indonesia	Bangkok, Thailand
15:00 UTC+7	Sirotha 8'; Chanmony 19'	Report (AFF)	Runtuboy 6', 22', 31', 36'; Iqbal 12'; Syauqi 21', 21', 22'; Marvin 28'; Diamant 30' (o.g.); Soumilena 37'	Stadium: Indoor Stadium Huamark; Attendance: 50; Referee: Andrew Best (Australia)

8 April 2022 Semi-finals	Myanmar	1–6	Indonesia	Bangkok, Thailand
14:30 UTC+7	Hlaing Min Tun 37'	Report (AFF)	Syauqi 17'; Soumilena 23'; Runtuboy 25', 35'; Guntur 40'; Firman 40'	Stadium: Indoor Stadium Huamark; Attendance: 250; Referee: Ali Hafizi (Iran)

10 April 2022 Final	Indonesia	2–2 (a.e.t.) (3–5 p)	Thailand	Bangkok, Thailand
17:00 UTC+7	Soumilena 8'; Runtuboy 25'	Report (AFF)	Aransanyalak 39'; Osamanmusa 40'	Stadium: Indoor Stadium Huamark; Referee: Abdulrahman Ali Aldoseri (Bahrain)
	Penalties
	Firman Adriansyah (penalty scored); Ardiansyah Runtuboy (penalty missed); Syauqi Saud (penalty scored); Ardiansyah Nur (penalty scored)		(penalty scored) Muhammad Osamanmusa; (penalty scored) Ronnachai Jungwongsuk; (penalty scored) Panat Kittipanuwong; (penalty scored) Krit Aransanyalak; (penalty scored) Peerapat Kaewwilai

==== 2021 Southeast Asian Games ====
11 May 2022	Vietnam	1–1	Indonesia	Hà Nam, Vietnam
16:00 UTC+7	Nguyễn Minh Trí 2'		Syauqi 33'	Stadium: Hà Nam Gymnasium

14 May 2022	Indonesia	6–0	Myanmar	Hà Nam, Vietnam
13:00 UTC+7	Runtuboy 5'; Iqbal 22'; Syauqi 27'; Soumilena 33', 38'; Ardiansyah N. 34'			Stadium: Hà Nam Gymnasium

16 May 2022	Malaysia	0–3	Indonesia	Hà Nam, Vietnam
13:00 UTC+7			Syauqi 17'; Firman 21', 22'	Stadium: Hà Nam Gymnasium

18 May 2022	Indonesia	1–1	Thailand	Hà Nam, Vietnam
13:00 UTC+7	Runtuboy 23'		Apiwat 23'	Stadium: Hà Nam Gymnasium

==== 2022 MNC International Futsal Cup ====
6 September 2022	Indonesia	6–2	South Korea	Yogyakarta, Indonesia
14:00 UTC+7	Firman 2'; Ryan Dwi 6'; Reza 10'; Subhan 13', 26'; Dewa 20'		Lee Han-Wool 5'; Shin Jong-hoon 22'	Stadium: GOR Amongraga

==== 2022 AFC Futsal Asian Cup ====
28 September 2022 Group C	Iran	5–0	Indonesia	Kuwait City, Kuwait
17:00 UTC+3	Ahmadabbasi 2', 22'; Oladghobad 2'; Asadshir 9'; Tayyebi 24'	Report		Stadium: Saad Al Abdullah Hall; Referee: Ryan Shepheard (Australia)

30 September 2022 Group C	Indonesia	7–2	Lebanon	Kuwait City, Kuwait
17:00 UTC+3	Pangestu 3'; Fajriyan 7'; Firman 19'; Iqbal 21'; Dewa 27'; Reza 37'; Syauqi 40'	Report	Zeitoun 25'; Koukezian 37'	Stadium: Saad Al Abdullah Hall; Referee: Trương Quốc Dũng (Vietnam)

2 October 2022 Group C	Chinese Taipei	1–4	Indonesia	Kuwait City, Kuwait
17:00 UTC+3	Lin Chih-hung 30'	Report	Fajriyan 10', 12', 12'; Syauqi 29'	Stadium: Saad Al Abdullah Hall; Referee: Husain Ali Al-Bahhar (Bahrain)

4 October 2022 Quarter-finals	Japan	3–2	Indonesia	Kuwait City, Kuwait
14:00 UTC+3	Kanazawa 32'; Pires 38'; Mizutani 39'	Report	Eko 21'; Dewa 40'	Stadium: Saad Al Abdullah Hall; Referee: Trương Quốc Dũng (Vietnam)

=== Men's national beach soccer team ===
==== 2022 AFF Beach Soccer Championship ====
28 September 2022	Indonesia	3–5	Thailand	Pattaya, Thailand
				Stadium: Jomtien Beach Arena

29 September 2022	Indonesia	2–9	Malaysia	Pattaya, Thailand
				Stadium: Jomtien Beach Arena
