= 2024–25 in Indonesian football =

Football in Indonesia
- Season: 2024–25

The following article presents a summary of the 2024–25 football season in Indonesia.

== Promotion and relegation ==
League	Promoted to league	Relegated from league
Liga 1	PSBS; Semen Padang; Malut United	RANS Nusantara; Bhayangkara Presisi; Persikabo 1973
Liga 2	Adhyaksa; Dejan; Persibo; Persikas; Persikota; Persiku	Kalteng Putra; Perserang; Persiba Balikpapan; Persikab; PSCS; PSDS; Sumut United; Sulut United

== National teams ==
=== Men's national football team ===
2 January 2024 Int'l Friendly	Indonesia	0–4	Libya	Aksu, Turkey
16:00 UTC+3		Report	Krawa'a 25'; Al Khouja 58'; Al-Qulaib 89'; Al Qajdar 90+2'	Stadium: Mardan Sports Complex; Referee: Bahattin Şimşek (Turkey)

5 January 2024 Int'l Friendly	Indonesia	1–2	Libya	Aksu, Turkey
16:00 UTC+3	Yakob 6'	Report	Al-Shuraimi 9'; Krawa'a 20'	Stadium: Mardan Sports Complex; Referee: Kadir Sağlam (Turkey)

9 January 2024 Int'l Friendly	Indonesia	0–5	Iran	Al Rayyan, Qatar
18:00 UTC+3		Report	Ghoddos 3'; Cheshmi 22'; Moghanlou 36'; Ghayedi 70', 87'	Stadium: Al-Rayyan Training Ground; Referee: Mohammed Braheh (Qatar)

2 June 2024 Int'l Friendly	Indonesia	0–0	Tanzania	Jakarta, Indonesia
16:00 UTC+7		Report		Stadium: Madya Stadium; Attendance: 5,831; Referee: Muhammad Taqi (Singapore)

==== 2023 AFC Asian Cup ====
15 January 2024 Group D	Indonesia	1–3	Iraq	Al Rayyan, Qatar
17:30 UTC+3	Marselino 37'	Report	M. Ali 17'; Rashid 45+7'; Hussein 75'	Stadium: Ahmad bin Ali Stadium; Attendance: 16,532; Referee: Ilgiz Tantashev (Uzbekistan)

19 January 2024 Group D	Vietnam	0–1	Indonesia	Doha, Qatar
17:30 UTC+3		Report	Asnawi 42' (pen.)	Stadium: Abdullah bin Khalifa Stadium; Attendance: 7,253; Referee: Sadullo Gulmurodi (Tajikistan)

24 January 2024 Group D	Japan	3–1	Indonesia	Doha, Qatar
14:30 UTC+3	Ueda 6' (pen.), 52'; Hubner 88' (o.g.)	Report	Walsh 90+1'	Stadium: Al Thumama Stadium; Attendance: 26,453; Referee: Khamis Al-Marri (Qatar)

28 January 2024 Round of 16	Australia	4–0	Indonesia	Al Rayyan, Qatar
14:30 UTC+3	Baggott 12' (o.g.); Boyle 45'; Goodwin 89'; Souttar 90+1'	Report		Stadium: Jassim bin Hamad Stadium; Attendance: 7,863; Referee: Mohammed Abdulla Hassan Mohamed (United Arab Emirates)

==== 2026 FIFA World Cup qualification – AFC second round ====
21 March 2024 Second round	Indonesia	1–0	Vietnam	Jakarta, Indonesia
20:30 UTC+7	Egy 52'	Report (FIFA); Report (AFC)		Stadium: Gelora Bung Karno Stadium; Attendance: 57,696; Referee: Salman Falahi (Qatar)

26 March 2024 Second round	Vietnam	0–3	Indonesia	Hanoi, Vietnam
19:00 UTC+7		Report (FIFA); Report (AFC)	Idzes 9'; Oratmangoen 23'; Sananta 90+8'	Stadium: Mỹ Đình National Stadium; Attendance: 27,832; Referee: Alireza Faghani (Australia)

6 June 2024 Second round	Indonesia	0–2	Iraq	Jakarta, Indonesia
16:00 UTC+7		Report (FIFA); Report (AFC)	Hussein 54' (pen.); Jasim 88'	Stadium: Gelora Bung Karno Stadium; Attendance: 60,245; Referee: Shaun Evans (Australia)

11 June 2024 Second round	Indonesia	2–0	Philippines	Jakarta, Indonesia
19:30 UTC+7	Haye 32'; Ridho 55'	Report (FIFA); Report (AFC)		Stadium: Gelora Bung Karno Stadium; Attendance: 64,942; Referee: Rustam Lutfullin (Uzbekistan)
Note: The home match of Indonesia against the Philippines is to be swapped with the away match because it coincides with the 2023 FIFA U-17 World Cup schedule. The change was confirmed on 31 October 2023 by FIFA.

==== 2026 FIFA World Cup qualification – AFC third round ====
5 September 2024 Third round	Saudi Arabia	1–1	Indonesia	Jeddah, Saudi Arabia
21:00 UTC+3	Al-Juwayr 45+3'	Report	Walsh 19'	Stadium: King Abdullah Sports City; Attendance: 42,385; Referee: Adham Makhadmeh (Jordan)

10 September 2024 Third round	Indonesia	0–0	Australia	Jakarta, Indonesia
19:00 UTC+7		Report		Stadium: Gelora Bung Karno Stadium; Attendance: 70,059; Referee: Salman Falahi (Qatar)

10 October 2024 Third round	Bahrain	2–2	Indonesia	Riffa, Bahrain
19:00 UTC+3	Marhoon 15', 90+9'	Report	Oratmangoen 45+3'; Struick 74'	Stadium: Bahrain National Stadium; Attendance: 10,731; Referee: Ahmed Al-Kaf (Oman)

15 October 2024 Third round	China	2–1	Indonesia	Qingdao, China
20:00 UTC+8	Abduweli 21'; Zhang Yuning 44'	Report	Haye 86'	Stadium: Qingdao Youth Football Stadium; Attendance: 37,133; Referee: Omar Al-Ali (United Arab Emirates)

15 November 2024 Third round	Indonesia	0–4	Japan	Jakarta, Indonesia
19:00 UTC+7		Report	Hubner 35' (o.g.); Minamino 40'; Morita 49'; Sugawara 69'	Stadium: Gelora Bung Karno Stadium; Attendance: 60,304; Referee: Mooud Bonyadifard (Iran)

19 November 2024 Third round	Indonesia	2–0	Saudi Arabia	Jakarta, Indonesia
19:00 UTC+7	Marselino 32', 57'	Report		Stadium: Gelora Bung Karno Stadium; Attendance: 55,970; Referee: Rustam Lutfullin (Uzbekistan)

==== 2024 ASEAN Championship ====
9 December 2024 Group B	Myanmar	0–1	Indonesia	Yangon, Myanmar
19:00 UTC+6:30		Report	Zin Nyi Nyi Aung 77' (o.g.)	Stadium: Thuwunna Stadium; Attendance: 12,500; Referee: Wong Wai Lun (Hong Kong)

12 December 2024 Group B	Indonesia	3–3	Laos	Surakarta, Indonesia
20:00 UTC+7	Kadek 12'; Ferarri 18', 72'	Report	Panyavong 9'; Phommathep 13'; Phanthavong 77'	Stadium: Manahan Stadium; Attendance: 14,455; Referee: Hiroki Kasahara (Japan)

15 December 2024 Group B	Vietnam	1–0	Indonesia	Phú Thọ, Vietnam
20:00 UTC+7	Nguyễn Quang Hải 77'	Report		Stadium: Việt Trì Stadium; Attendance: 16,669; Referee: Abdullah Dhafer Al-Shehri (Saudi Arabia)

21 December 2024 Group B	Indonesia	0–1	Philippines	Surakarta, Indonesia
20:00 UTC+7		Report	Kristensen 63' (pen.)	Stadium: Manahan Stadium; Attendance: 17,390; Referee: Koji Takasaki (Japan)

=== Men's under-23 football team ===
5 April 2024 Int'l Friendly	Indonesia	1–3	Saudi Arabia	Dubai, United Arab Emirates
20:30 UTC+3	Komang 32'		Thakri 18'; Asiri 59'; Radif 90'	Stadium: The Sevens Stadium

8 April 2024 Int'l Friendly	United Arab Emirates	0–1	Indonesia	Dubai, United Arab Emirates
21:30 UTC+3			Witan 52'	Stadium: Rashid Stadium

==== 2024 AFC U-23 Asian Cup ====
15 April 2024 Group A	Qatar	2–0	Indonesia	Al Rayyan, Qatar
18:30 UTC+3	Ali Sabah 45+1' (pen.); Al-Rawi 54'	Report		Stadium: Jassim Bin Hamad Stadium; Attendance: 8,867; Referee: Nasrullo Kabirov (Tajikistan)

18 April 2024 Group A	Indonesia	1–0	Australia	Doha, Qatar
16:00 UTC+3	Komang 45'	Report		Stadium: Abdullah bin Khalifa Stadium; Attendance: 2,925; Referee: Majed Al-Shamrani (Saudi Arabia)

21 April 2024 Group A	Jordan	1–4	Indonesia	Doha, Qatar
18:30 UTC+3	Hubner 79' (o.g.)	Report	Marselino 23' (pen.), 70'; Witan 40'; Komang 86'	Stadium: Abdullah bin Khalifa Stadium; Attendance: 5,632; Referee: Ammar Ashkanani (Kuwait)

25 April 2024 Quarter-finals	South Korea	2–2 (a.e.t.) (10–11 p)	Indonesia	Doha, Qatar
20:30 UTC+3	Komang 45' (o.g.); Sang-bin 84'	Report	Struick 15', 45+3'	Stadium: Abdullah bin Khalifa Stadium; Attendance: 9,105; Referee: Shaun Evans (Australia)
	Penalties
	Kim Min-woo (penalty scored); Lee Kang-hee (penalty scored); Hwang Jae-won (penalty scored); Paik Sang-hoon (penalty scored); Byun Joon-soo (penalty scored); Kang Sang-yoon (penalty missed); Jeong Sang-bin (penalty scored); Hong Yun-sang (penalty scored); Cho Hyun-taek (penalty scored); Baek Jong-bum (penalty scored); Kim Min-woo (penalty scored); Lee Kang-hee (penalty missed)		(penalty scored) Sananta; (penalty scored) Arhan; (penalty scored) Struick; (penalty scored) Marselino; (penalty scored) Hubner; (penalty missed) Arkhan; (penalty scored) Sroyer; (penalty scored) Ridho; (penalty scored) Ferarri; (penalty scored) Ernando; (penalty scored) Sananta; (penalty scored) Arhan

29 April 2024 Semi-finals	Indonesia	0–2	Uzbekistan	Doha, Qatar
17:00 UTC+3		Report	Norchaev 68'; Arhan 86' (o.g.)	Stadium: Abdullah bin Khalifa Stadium; Attendance: 8,792; Referee: Shen Yinhao (China)

2 May 2024 Third place play-off	Iraq	2–1 (a.e.t.)	Indonesia	Doha, Qatar
18:30 UTC+3	Tahseen 27'; Jasim 96'	Report	Jenner 19'	Stadium: Abdullah bin Khalifa Stadium; Attendance: 8,090; Referee: Majed Al-Shamrani (Saudi Arabia)

==== 2024 Summer Olympic's qualification - AFC–CAF play-off ====
9 May 2024	Guinea	1–0	Indonesia	Clairefontaine-en-Yvelines, France
15:00 UTC+2	Moriba 29' (pen.)	Report		Stadium: INF Clairefontaine; Referee: François Letexier (France)

=== Men's under-20 football team ===
26 January 2024 Int'l Friendly	Indonesia	1–2	Thailand	Jakarta, Indonesia
19:30 UTC+7	Firmansyah 13'		Paripan 63'; Pikanet 90+3'	Stadium: Gelora Bung Karno Stadium; Attendance: 45,574; Referee: Khamis Al-Marri (Qatar)

30 January 2024 Int'l Friendly	Indonesia	2–3	Uzbekistan	Jakarta, Indonesia
19:30 UTC+7	Kafiatur 32'; Arlyansyah 74'		Reimov 4'; Kurbonov 39'; Khayrullaev 87'	Stadium: Madya Stadium; Referee: Thoriq Alkatiri (Indonesia)

22 March 2024 Int'l Friendly	Indonesia	1–1	China	Jakarta, Indonesia
20:30 UTC+7	Figo 90+2' (pen.)		Peng Xiao 15'	Stadium: Madya Stadium; Referee: Yudi Nurcahya (Indonesia)

25 March 2024 Int'l Friendly	China	1–1	Indonesia	Jakarta, Indonesia
20:30 UTC+7	Zhong Wen 85'		Ji Da-bin 90'	Stadium: Madya Stadium; Referee: Thoriq Alkatiri (Indonesia)

==== 2024 Maurice Revello Tournament ====
4 June 2024 Group B	Indonesia	0–3	Ukraine	Vitrolles, France
18:00 UTC+2		Report	Synchuk 9'; Mykhaylenko 30'; Fedor 59'	Stadium: Stade Jules-Ladoumègue; Referee: Akhona Makalima (South Africa)

6 June 2024 Group B	Indonesia	0–4	Panama	Aubagne, France
18:00 UTC+2		Report	Orelien 21', 57', 68' (pen.); Pinzón 88'	Stadium: Stade de Lattre-de-Tassigny; Referee: Iuliana Demetrescu (Romania)

8 June 2024 Group B	Japan	4–1	Indonesia	Fos-sur-Mer, France
14:00 UTC+2	S. Kanda 7', 47'; Sato 66'; Michiwaki 90+4'	Report	Mauresmo 70' (pen.)	Stadium: Stade Parsemain; Referee: Myriam Marcotte (Canada)

12 June 2024 Group B	Italy	1–0	Indonesia	Salon-de-Provence, France
18:15 UTC+2	Raimondo 38'	Report		Stadium: Stade d'Honneur Marcel Roustan; Referee: Odette Hamilton (Jamaica)

14 June 2024 Ninth place play-off	South Korea	2–1	Indonesia	Saint-Chamas, France
14:00 UTC+2	Jung Seung-bae 48', 59'	Report	Firmansyah 78'	Stadium: Stade René Gimet; Referee: Akhona Makalima (South Africa)

==== 2024 ASEAN U-19 Boys Championship ====
17 July 2024 Group A	Indonesia	6–0	Philippines	Surabaya, Indonesia
19:30 UTC+7	Arlyansyah 12', 50'; Iqbal 21', 43'; Kadek 29'; Raven 87'	Report		Stadium: Gelora Bung Tomo Stadium; Referee: Faisal Sulaiman Al Balawi (Saudi Arabia)

20 July 2024 Group A	Cambodia	0–2	Indonesia	Surabaya, Indonesia
19:30 UTC+7		Report	Kadek 71'; Iqbal 86'	Stadium: Gelora Bung Tomo Stadium; Referee: Yahya Ahmed Al Balushi (Oman)

23 July 2024 Group A	Indonesia	6–2	Timor-Leste	Surabaya, Indonesia
19:30 UTC+7	Raven 18', 26'; Quintao 45+1' (o.g.); Kadek 51'; Arkhan 53'; Kafiatur 57'	Report	Bianco 23' (pen.); Bahkito 86'	Stadium: Gelora Bung Tomo Stadium; Referee: Choi Hyun-jai (South Korea)

27 July 2024 Semi-finals	Indonesia	1–0	Malaysia	Surabaya, Indonesia
19:30 UTC+7	Alfharezzi 78'	Report		Stadium: Gelora Bung Tomo Stadium; Referee: Yahya Ahmed Al Balushi (Oman)

29 July 2024 Final	Thailand	0–1	Indonesia	Surabaya, Indonesia
19:30 UTC+7		Report	Raven 17'	Stadium: Gelora Bung Tomo Stadium; Referee: Faisal Sulaiman Al Balawi (Saudi Arabia)

==== 2024 Seoul EOU Cup ====
28 August 2024	Argentina	1–2	Indonesia	Seoul, South Korea
16:00 UTC+9	Juárez 18'	Report	Kadek 74'; Maouri 79' (pen.)	Stadium: Mokdong Stadium; Referee: Jo Jun-soo (South Korea)

30 August 2024	Indonesia	0–2	Thailand	Seoul, South Korea
16:00 UTC+9		Report	Caelan 10'; Rattapoom 90+1'	Stadium: Mokdong Stadium; Referee: Hwang Min-gyu (South Korea)

1 September 2024	South Korea	3–0	Indonesia	Seoul, South Korea
19:30 UTC+9	Shin Min-ha 5'; Kim Tae-won 25'; Hong Seok-hyun 32'	Report		Stadium: Mokdong Stadium; Referee: Park Byung-hon (South Korea)

==== 2025 AFC U-20 Asian Cup qualification ====
25 September 2024 Group F	Indonesia	4–0	Maldives	Jakarta, Indonesia
19:30 UTC+7	Aditya 52'; Figo 55'; Toni 57'; Raven 66'	Report		Stadium: Madya Stadium; Attendance: 1,548; Referee: Mohamed Khaled (Bahrain)

27 September 2024 Group F	Timor-Leste	1–3	Indonesia	Jakarta, Indonesia
19:30 UTC+7	Luís Figo 67'	Report	Raven 13'; Afrisal 16'; Ragil 78'	Stadium: Madya Stadium; Attendance: 2,761; Referee: Saud Al-Samhan (Kuwait)

29 September 2024 Group F	Indonesia	1–1	Yemen	Jakarta, Indonesia
19:30 UTC+7	Raven 45+1'	Report	Al Khadher 45+3'	Stadium: Madya Stadium; Attendance: 7,015; Referee: Resul Mämmedow (Turkmenistan)

==== 2025 AFC U-20 Asian Cup ====
13 February 2025 AFC U-20 Asian Cup GS	Iran	3–0	Indonesia	Shenzhen, China
19:30 UTC+8		Report	Nafari 5'; Gholizadeh 63'; Dehghan 70'	Stadium: Shenzhen Youth Football Training Base Centre Stadium; Attendance: 356; Referee: Hiroki Kasahara (Japan)

16 February 2025 AFC U-20 Asian Cup GS	Indonesia	v	Uzbekistan	Shenzhen, China
19:30 UTC+8				Stadium: Shenzhen Youth Football Training Base Centre Stadium

19 February 2025 AFC U-20 Asian Cup GS	Indonesia	v	Yemen	Shenzhen, China
19:30 UTC+8				Stadium: Shenzhen Youth Football Training Base Centre Stadium

=== Men's under-17 football team ===
25 August 2024 Int'l Friendly	Indonesia	3–1	India	Gianyar, Indonesia
20:00 UTC+8	Evandra 14' (pen.); Fandi 50'; Mierza 62'	Report	Zangminlun 52'	Stadium: Kapten I Wayan Dipta Stadium; Referee: Thoriq Alkatiri (Indonesia)

27 August 2024 Int'l Friendly	India	1–0	Indonesia	Gianyar, Indonesia
20:00 UTC+8	Brahmacharimayum 78'	Report		Stadium: Kapten I Wayan Dipta Stadium; Referee: Ryan Nanda Saputra (Indonesia)

==== 2024 ASEAN U-16 Boys Championship ====
21 June 2024 Group A	Indonesia	3–0	Singapore	Surakarta, Indonesia
19:30 UTC+7	Mierza 39'; Evandra 59' (pen.); Alberto 86'	Report		Stadium: Manahan Stadium; Referee: Koji Takasaki (Japan)

24 June 2024 Group A	Philippines	0–3	Indonesia	Surakarta, Indonesia
19:30 UTC+7		Report	Evandra 65'; Mierza 71', 90+2'	Stadium: Manahan Stadium; Referee: Du Jianxin (China)

27 June 2024 Group A	Indonesia	6–1	Laos	Surakarta, Indonesia
19:30 UTC+7	Zahaby 24' (pen.); Sayyavath 30' (o.g.); Josh 37', 61'; Panji 45+3'; Mierza 79'	Report	Phayak 7' (pen.)	Stadium: Manahan Stadium; Referee: Poon Chun Kit (Hong Kong)

1 July 2024 Semi-finals	Indonesia	3–5	Australia	Surakarta, Indonesia
19:30 UTC+7	Gholy 3', 45+5'; Holong 90+3'	Report	Tatu 23', 66'; MacNicol 45+2'; Didulica 70', 86'	Stadium: Manahan Stadium; Referee: Koji Takasaki (Japan)

3 July 2024 Third place match	Vietnam	0–5	Indonesia	Surakarta, Indonesia
15:00 UTC+7		Report	Gholy 45', 78'; Zaidan 45+4'; Daniel 76', 82'	Stadium: Manahan Stadium; Referee: Du Jianxin (China)

==== 2025 AFC U-17 Asian Cup qualification ====
23 October 2024 Group G	Indonesia	1–0	Kuwait	Farwaniya, Kuwait
17:30 UTC+3	Baker 8'			Stadium: Ali Sabah Al-Salem Stadium; Attendance: 0 Referee: Ammar Abo Alo (Syria)

25 October 2024 Group G	Northern Mariana Islands	0–10	Indonesia	Farwaniya, Kuwait
17:30 UTC+3		Report	Gholy 1', 9'; Aldyansyah 15', 24'; Evandra 21'; Gelgel 23', 42'; Ida Bagus 69'; Daniel 87'; Alberto 90+2'	Stadium: Ali Sabah Al-Salem Stadium; Attendance: 0 Referee: Mahmoud Ahmad Mazin Alsawalmeh (Jordan)

27 October 2024 Group G	Australia	0–0	Indonesia	Farwaniya, Kuwait
17:30 UTC+3				Stadium: Ali Sabah Al-Salem Stadium; Attendance: 0 Referee: Khalid Khallufah S Alahmari (Saudi Arabia)

=== Women's national football team ===
28 May 2024 Int'l Friendly	Indonesia	5–1	Singapore	Jakarta, Indonesia
19:00 UTC+7	Marsela 11', 66'; Claudia 64', 87' (pen.); Reva 90+5'	Report	Dorcas 20'	Stadium: Gelora Madya Stadium; Attendance: 2,939

8 June 2024 Int'l Friendly	Bahrain	2–3	Indonesia	Manama, Bahrain
19:00 UTC+3	Sabkar 63'; Al-Ali 78'	Report	Safira 4'; Octavianti 26'; Scheunemann 43'	Stadium: Al Ahli Stadium

11 June 2024 Int'l Friendly	Indonesia	3–0	Bahrain	Manama, Bahrain
19:00 UTC+3	Scheunemann 57'; Zahra M. 70'; Citra R. 90+2'			Stadium: Al Ahli Stadium

11 July 2024 Int'l Friendly	Hong Kong	3–2	Indonesia	Happy Valley, Hong Kong
18:00 UTC+8	Chung Pui-ki 19'; Chan Wing Sze 54'; Cheung Wai Ki 69'	Report (FIFA)	Citra R. 24'; Awi 80'	Stadium: Hong Kong Football Club Stadium; Attendance: 0

14 July 2024 Int'l Friendly	Hong Kong	4–1	Indonesia	Happy Valley, Hong Kong
18:00 UTC+8	Ting 5'; Meo Ho 25'; Cheung 28', 45+3'	Report (FIFA)	Sheva 63'	Stadium: Hong Kong Football Club Stadium; Attendance: 1,589; Referee: Supiree Testhomya (Thailand)

25 October 2024 Int'l Friendly	Netherlands	15–0	Indonesia	Doetinchem, Netherlands
20:45 UTC+1	Leuchter 10', 31'; Roord 21', 48'; Spitse 28' (pen.); Hupatea 32' (o.g.); Keukelaar 41', 57'; Egurrola 56'; Nijstad 63', 73'; Jansen 66', 74', 81'; Snoeijs 75'			Stadium: De Vijverberg; Referee: Caroline Lanssens (Belgium)

==== 2024 ASEAN Women's Cup ====
23 November 2024 Group B	Indonesia	0–0	Cambodia	Vientiane, Laos
15:00 UTC+7		Report		Stadium: New Laos National Stadium; Referee: Cha Min-ji (South Korea)

26 November 2024 Group B	Malaysia	0–1	Indonesia	Vientiane, Laos
19:30 UTC+7		Report	Claudia 79'	Stadium: New Laos National Stadium; Referee: Asaka Koizumi (Japan)

2 December 2024 Semi-finals	Timor-Leste	0–3	Indonesia	Vientiane, Laos
19:30 UTC+7		Report	Scheunemann 6'; Octaviani 45'; Dwi 90+4'	Stadium: New Laos National Stadium; Referee: Cha Min-ji (South Korea)

5 December 2024 Final	Cambodia	1–3	Indonesia	Vientiane, Laos
19:30 UTC+7	Saody 32'	Report	Octaviani 24', 57'; Hopper 35'	Stadium: New Laos National Stadium; Referee: Asaka Koizumi (Japan)

=== Women's under-17 football team ===
==== 2024 AFC U-17 Women's Asian Cup ====
6 May 2024 Group A	Indonesia	1–6	Philippines	Gianyar, Indonesia
19:00 UTC+8	Scheunemann 12'	Report	Pino 6', 35'; Guy 22'; Markey 29'; Collins 54', 62'	Stadium: Kapten I Wayan Dipta Stadium; Referee: Supiree Testhomya (Thailand)

9 May 2024 Group A	South Korea	12–0	Indonesia	Gianyar, Indonesia
19:00 UTC+8	Kim Hyo-won 13'; Han Guk-hee 34'; Beom Ye-ju 39'; Park Ji-yu 41'; Won Ju-eun 45+1', 50', 61', 86'; Kim Yee-un 59' (pen.); Baek Ji-eun 80', 82'; Seo Min-jeong 90+2'	Report		Stadium: Kapten I Wayan Dipta Stadium; Referee: Rebecca Durcau (Australia)

12 May 2024 Group A	Indonesia	0–9	North Korea	Gianyar, Indonesia
16:00 UTC+8		Report	Choe Il-son 1', 10', 38', 40', 47'; Kang Ryu-mi 11', 45+3'; Ro Un-hyang 14', 44'	Stadium: Kapten I Wayan Dipta Stadium; Referee: Mahsa Ghorbani (Iran)

=== Men's national futsal team ===
13 October 2024 Int'l Friendly	Indonesia	6–0	Malaysia	Yogyakarta, Indonesia
19:00 UTC+7	Firman 4'; Runtuboy 6'; Evan 10', 19', 32'; Amos 32'	Report		Stadium: Among Rogo Sports Hall

==== 2024 ASEAN Futsal Championship ====
4 November 2024 Group B	Indonesia	9–0	Cambodia	Nakhon Ratchasima, Thailand
13:00 UTC+7	Firman 2'; Sachakboth 3' (o.g.); Samuel Eko 5'; Iqbal 9', 34'; Brian Ick 15'; Guntur 19'; Syaifullah 31'; Nizar 35'	Report		Stadium: Terminal Hall; Referee: Muhammad Faiz Jamaluddin (Malaysia)

5 November 2024 Group B	Australia	1–3	Indonesia	Nakhon Ratchasima, Thailand
13:00 UTC+7	Lynch 20'	Report	Evan 7'; Romi 15', 35'	Stadium: Terminal Hall

6 November 2024 Group B	Indonesia	5–1	Myanmar	Nakhon Ratchasima, Thailand
13:00 UTC+7	Pangestu 15'; Ick 22'; Eko 23'; Firman 31'; Romi 33'	Report	Lwin 26'	Stadium: Terminal Hall; Referee: Muhammad Faiz Jamaluddin (Malaysia)

8 November 2024 Semi-finals	Indonesia	5–1	Thailand	Nakhon Ratchasima, Thailand
18:00 UTC+7	Soumilena 8'; Ick 22', 27'; Pangestu 33'; Adriansyah 38'	Report	Teerapat 37'	Stadium: Terminal Hall; Attendance: 3,264; Referee: Leung Chung Yin (Hong Kong)

10 November 2024 Final	Vietnam	0–2	Indonesia	Nakhon Ratchasima, Thailand
18:00 UTC+7		Report	Syaifullah 8'; Xavier 39'	Stadium: Terminal Hall; Referee: Moon Dae-sung (South Korea)

=== Women's national futsal team ===
==== 2024 NSDF Women's Futsal Championship ====
22 September 2024	China	4–0	Indonesia	Nakhon Ratchasima, Thailand
15:00 UTC+7		Report		Stadium: Terminal Hall

25 September 2024	Indonesia	1–4	Vietnam	Nakhon Ratchasima, Thailand
15:00 UTC+7		Report		Stadium: Terminal Hall

26 September 2024	Indonesia	1–7	Thailand	Nakhon Ratchasima, Thailand
18:00 UTC+7		Report		Stadium: Terminal Hall

28 September 2024	Chinese Taipei	3–2	Indonesia	Nakhon Ratchasima, Thailand
18:00 UTC+7		Report		Stadium: Terminal Hall

==== 2024 ASEAN Women's Futsal Championship ====
16 November 2024 Group stage	Indonesia	0–1	Thailand	Pasig, Philippines
16:00 UTC+8		Report	Peanpailun 36'	Stadium: Philsports Arena

18 November 2024 Group stage	Vietnam	5–0	Indonesia	Pasig, Philippines
16:00 UTC+8	Nguyễn Phương Anh 1'; Bùi Thị Trang 5', 6'; Biện Thị Hằng 12'; Lê Thị Thanh Ngân 38'	Report		Stadium: Philsports Arena

19 November 2024 Group stage	Indonesia	7–0	Myanmar	Pasig, Philippines
16:00 UTC+8	Sundari 11'; Hendrita 14'; Rosdiana 16', 21'; Rosita 23'; Sari 30'; Matulapelwa 33'	Report		Stadium: Philsports Arena

21 November 2024 Third place match	Indonesia	4–1	Myanmar	Pasig, Philippines
16:00 UTC+8	Phu Pwint Khaing 2' (o.g.); Sari 7'; Rosdiana 25'; Karath 30'	Report	Wutt Yee Lwin 28'	Stadium: Philsports Arena

== League tables ==
=== Liga 1 Indonesia ===
Pos	Team	Pld	W	D	L	GF	GA	GD	Pts	Qualification or relegation
1	Persib (C)	34	19	12	3	60	33	+27	69	Qualification for the 2025–26 AFC Champions League Two qualifying play-offs
2	Dewa United	34	17	10	7	65	33	+32	61	Qualification for the 2025–26 AFC Challenge League group stage
3	Malut United	34	15	12	7	48	33	+15	57	
4	Persebaya	34	15	11	8	41	38	+3	56 (Note: Ranked on head-to-head points: Persebaya 4, Borneo Samarinda 1.)	
5	Borneo Samarinda	34	16	8	10	50	38	+12	56	
6	PSM	34	13	14	7	47	34	+13	53	
7	Persija	34	14	9	11	47	38	+9	51	
8	Bali United	34	14	8	12	50	41	+9	50	
9	PSBS	34	13	9	12	44	47	−3	48	
10	Arema	34	13	8	13	53	51	+2	47	
11	Persita	34	12	7	15	32	43	−11	43	
12	Persik	34	10	11	13	40	42	−2	41	
13	Semen Padang	34	9	9	16	38	60	−22	36 (Note: Ranked on head-to-head points: Semen Padang 8, Persis 5, Madura United 3.)	
14	Persis	34	9	9	16	34	46	−12	36	
15	Madura United	34	10	6	18	36	58	−22	36	
16	PSS (Note: PSS was deducted three points by the PSSI Disciplinary Committee due to the match fixing case in the 2018 Liga 2.) (R)	34	11	4	19	43	50	−7	34 (Note: Tied on head-to-head points. Ranked on head-to-head goal differences: PSS +2, Barito Putera –2.)	Relegation to the 2025–26 Championship
17	Barito Putera (R)	34	8	10	16	42	57	−15	34	Relegation to the 2025–26 Championship
18	PSIS (R)	34	6	7	21	29	57	−28	25	Relegation to the 2025–26 Championship

Source: Liga 1 2024–25
Rules for classification: 1) Points; 2) Head-to-head points; 3) Head-to-head goal difference; 4) Head-to-head goals scored; 5) Goal difference; 6) Goals scored; 7) Fair-play points; 8) Drawing of lots.
(C) Champions; (R) Relegated

==== Liga 2 Indonesia ====
Pos	Team	Pld	W	D	L	GF	GA	GD	Pts	Qualification	PRJ	PKC	PKU	MDN	FBC	TNG	DJN	SFC	PBO
1	Persiraja	16	10	4	2	33	17	+16	34	Qualification to the Championship round		1–1	1–1	2–1	2–1	6–2	2–0	1–0	3–1
2	PSKC	16	8	3	5	19	15	+4	27 (Note: Ranked on head-to-head points: PSKC 4, PSPS 1.)	Qualification to the Championship round	0–3		1–0	1–0	0–1	3–1	3–0	2–1	2–0
3	PSPS	16	7	6	3	27	19	+8	27	Qualification to the Championship round	1–1	1–1		1–0	0–0	1–0	2–0	2–0	3–1
4	PSMS	16	7	5	4	23	13	+10	26	Qualification to the Relegation round	1–2	4–2	1–1		0–0	1–0	1–1	1–0	4–1
5	Bekasi City	16	7	4	5	23	18	+5	25	Qualification to the Relegation round	2–0	1–0	4–3	0–2		0–0	1–2	2–1	5–0
6	Persikota	16	6	2	8	23	24	−1	20 (Note: Tied on head-to-head points. Ranked on head-to-head goal difference: Persikota +1, Dejan –1.)	Qualification to the Relegation round	1–0	0–1	4–6	0–1	2–1		3–1	2–0	6–1
7	Dejan	16	5	5	6	17	23	−6	20	Qualification to the Relegation round	1–1	1–0	0–1	2–2	1–1	1–0		1–0	3–0
8	Sriwijaya	16	3	5	8	19	23	−4	14	Qualification to the Relegation round	2–4	1–1	3–2	0–0	5–3	0–0	1–1		5–1
9	Persikabo 1973	16	1	2	13	15	47	−32	5	Qualification to the Relegation round	2–4	0–1	2–2	0–4	0–1	1–2	5–2	0–0	

Source: Liga 2 2024–25
Legend: Blue = home team win; Yellow = draw; Red = away team win.
Rules for classification: 1) Points; 2) Head-to-head points; 3) Head-to-head goal difference; 4) Head-to-head goals scored; 5) Goal difference; 6) Goals scored; 7) Fair-play points; 8) Draw.
Notes:

Pos	Team	Pld	W	D	L	GF	GA	GD	Pts	Qualification	BFC	JOG	JAP	AFC	NFC	TGL	PTI	KDS	PES
1	Bhayangkara Presisi	16	9	6	1	27	7	+20	33	Qualification to the Championship round		0–1	4–0	1–0	2–1	0–0	1–0	0–0	7–0
2	PSIM	16	8	5	3	28	7	+21	29	Qualification to the Championship round	1–2		0–0	3–0	5–0	3–0	1–0	2–0	5–0
3	Persijap	16	7	7	2	20	9	+11	28	Qualification to the Championship round	0–2	0–0		0–0	3–0	1–0	3–0	0–0	3–0
4	Adhyaksa	16	7	4	5	20	14	+6	25	Qualification to the Relegation round	1–1	0–0	0–1		2–0	0–2	3–1	1–0	5–0
5	Nusantara United	16	4	7	5	14	21	−7	19	Qualification to the Relegation round	0–1	1–1	0–0	2–1		0–0	0–0	0–0	4–2
6	Persekat	16	5	3	8	17	21	−4	18 (Note: Tied on head-to-head points. Ranked on head-to-head goal difference: Persekat +1, Persipa –1.)	Qualification to the Relegation round	1–4	0–0	1–3	0–2	1–2		2–0	2–1	4–0
7	Persipa	16	4	6	6	11	16	−5	18	Qualification to the Relegation round	1–1	3–1	1–1	1–1	1–1	1–0		0–0	1–0
8	Persiku	16	3	7	6	8	15	−7	16	Qualification to the Relegation round	0–0	0–5	1–1	1–2	1–1	1–0	0–1		2–0
9	Persikas	16	2	1	13	10	45	−35	7	Qualification to the Relegation round	1–1	1–0	0–4	1–2	1–2	3–4	1–0	0–1	

Source: Liga 2 2024–25
Legend: Blue = home team win; Yellow = draw; Red = away team win.
Rules for classification: 1) Points; 2) Head-to-head points; 3) Head-to-head goal difference; 4) Head-to-head goals scored; 5) Goal difference; 6) Goals scored; 7) Fair-play points; 8) Draw.
Notes:

Pos	Team	Pld	W	D	L	GF	GA	GD	Pts	Qualification	PSL	DTS	PSP	PSB	PAL	GRS	RFC	WAR
1	Persela	14	7	5	2	23	13	+10	26	Qualification to the Championship round		2–2	2–1	3–1	0–0	3–1	1–1	3–0 (Note: The match was awarded as a 3–0 victory to Persela, after Persewar did not send their team for the match and failed to report to PSSI regarding their unpreparedness to play several days before the match.)
2	Deltras	14	6	7	1	22	11	+11	25	Qualification to the Championship round	2–2		2–0	3–0 (Note: The match was supposed to be ended as a 1–0 victory to Deltras but were interrupted after some controversy surfaced during the match especially the Persibo goal scored by Amir Hamzah, where the Deltras team considered the goal invalid because it was scored in a quick free kick position immediately after the foul occurred and the referee had not yet blown the whistle to pointing the free kick spot. The PSSI Disciplinary Committee has given their verdict to annul Persibo's goal and ordered the interrupted match to be resumed at a neutral venue without spectators, but Persibo appealed the decision and was granted as it is not on Disciplinary Committee's stand ground. PT LIB announced the final status of the interrupted match. Persibo decided not to resume the interrupted match on 18 January 2025.)	1–1	2–1	3–0	2–0
3	Persipura	14	7	2	5	25	14	+11	23	Qualification to the Relegation round	0–1	1–1		1–2	4–0	3–1	4–0	2–1
4	Persibo	14	7	2	5	25	17	+8	23	Qualification to the Relegation round	2–0	0–0	2–3		1–0	2–1	7–0	3–0
5	Persipal	14	6	4	4	18	18	0	22	Qualification to the Relegation round	1–1	2–1	0–3	1–0		1–0	2–0	3–2
6	Gresik United	14	6	3	5	18	16	+2	21	Qualification to the Relegation round	2–1	1–1	0–0	1–0	3–2		3–0	1–0
7	RANS Nusantara	14	2	3	9	9	36	−27	9	Qualification to the Relegation round	0–3	0–0	1–0	2–2	0–3	0–2		3–5
8	Persewar (Note: Persewar was deducted nine points by the PSSI Disciplinary Committee.)	14	1	2	11	16	31	−15	−4	Qualification to the Relegation round	0–1	1–2	1–3	2–3	2–2	1–1	1–2	

Source: Liga 2 2024–25
Legend: Blue = home team win; Yellow = draw; Red = away team win.
Rules for classification: 1) Points; 2) Head-to-head points; 3) Head-to-head goal difference; 4) Head-to-head goals scored; 5) Goal difference; 6) Goals scored; 7) Fair-play points; 8) Draw.

==== Liga Nusantara ====
Pos	Team	Pld	W	D	L	GF	GA	GD	Pts	Qualification	TRD	SUM	CMS	PBB	PSP	757	SRG	PDS
1	Tornado	14	9	2	3	27	14	+13	29	Qualification to the Championship round		1–0	1–2	0–1	2–1	1–0	2–0	5–0
2	Sumut United	14	7	5	2	21	7	+14	26	Qualification to the Championship round	2–1		0–0	0–0	1–1	3–1	3–0	6–0
3	PSGC	14	7	5	2	19	13	+6	26	Qualification to the Championship round	1–1	0–0		1–0	1–0	1–4	3–1	2–1
4	Persikab	14	6	4	4	19	14	+5	22	Qualification to the Relegation play-offs	1–2	2–1	1–1		1–1	1–0	0–1	3–0
5	PCB Persipasi	14	6	2	6	20	16	+4	20	Qualification to the Relegation play-offs	2–3	0–1	2–0	3–1		0–2	0–1	3–1
6	757 Kepri Jaya	14	5	3	6	25	20	+5	18	Qualification to the Relegation play-offs	2–3	0–0	1–1	1–3	0–2		3–2	4–1
7	Perserang	14	4	3	7	21	22	−1	15	Qualification to the Relegation play-offs	1–1	1–2	0–1	2–2	2–3	2–2		5–0
8	PSDS	14	0	0	14	6	52	−46	0	Qualification to the Relegation play-offs	1–4	0–2	1–5	1–3	0–2	0–5	0–3	

Source: Liga Nusantara 2024–25
Legend: Blue = home team win; Yellow = draw; Red = away team win.
Rules for classification: 1) Points; 2) Head-to-head points; 3) Head-to-head goal difference; 4) Head-to-head goals scored; 5) Goal difference; 6) Goals scored; 7) Fair-play points; 8) Draw.

Pos	Team	Pld	W	D	L	GF	GA	GD	Pts	Qualification	BPP	PAS	NZR	WAA	PBA	PSM	CLP	PSI
1	Persiba Balikpapan	12	7	4	1	21	11	+10	25	Qualification to the Championship round		2–0	1–1	0–0	2–1	1–0	3–1	
2	Persekabpas	12	8	0	4	30	16	+14	24	Qualification to the Championship round	2–3		2–4	1–2	3–0	5–0	2–1	
3	NZR Sumbersari	12	7	3	2	22	14	+8	24	Qualification to the Championship round	2–2	0–2		1–3	1–0	1–0	3–2	
4	Waanal Brothers	12	6	4	2	19	14	+5	22	Qualification to the Relegation play-offs	2–1	1–2	1–1		2–1	1–1	2–1	
5	Persiba Bantul	12	3	2	7	15	20	−5	11	Qualification to the Relegation play-offs	1–1	2–4	1–2	1–2		2–2	2–1	
6	PSM Madiun	12	2	3	7	11	29	−18	9	Qualification to the Relegation play-offs	1–4	0–5	0–2	3–2	0–3		2–1	
7	PSCS	12	0	2	10	11	25	−14	2	Qualification to the Relegation play-offs	0–1	1–2	0–4	1–1	0–1	2–2		
8	Persipani (D, R)	0	0	0	0	0	0	0	0	Disqualified (Note: Persipani was disqualified by the PSSI Disciplinary Committee for failing to send players and officials for three consecutive matches, with sanctions including relegation and a fine of IDR 150 million.)								

Source: Liga Nusantara 2024–25
Legend: Blue = home team win; Yellow = draw; Red = away team win.
Rules for classification: 1) Points; 2) Head-to-head points; 3) Head-to-head goal difference; 4) Head-to-head goals scored; 5) Goal difference; 6) Goals scored; 7) Fair-play points; 8) Draw.
(D) Disqualified; (R) Relegated

== AFC Competitions ==
=== AFC Champions League Two ===
==== Group F ====
Pos	Team	Pld	W	D	L	GF	GA	GD	Pts	Qualification	LCS	POR	ZHP	PSB
1	(Singapore) Lion City Sailors	6	3	1	2	15	11	+4	10	Advance to round of 16	—	5–2	2–0	2–3
2	(Thailand) Port	6	3	1	2	9	11	−2	10	Advance to round of 16	1–3	—	1–0	2–2
3	(China) Zhejiang	6	3	0	3	10	10	0	9		4–2	1–2	—	1–0
4	(Indonesia) Persib	6	1	2	3	9	11	−2	5		1–1	0–1	3–4	—

Source: AFC
Rules for classification: Tiebreakers

=== AFC Challenge League ===
==== Group E ====
Pos	Team	Pld	W	D	L	GF	GA	GD	Pts	Qualification	MDU	SVR	SPF
1	(Indonesia) Madura United	2	1	1	0	2	1	+1	4	Advance to Quarter-finals		2–1	
2	(Cambodia) Svay Rieng	2	1	0	1	3	3	0	3	Advance to Quarter-finals			2–1
3	(Mongolia) SP Falcons (H)	2	0	1	1	1	2	−1	1		0–0		

Source: AFC
(H) Hosts

=== Quarter-finals ===
In the quarter-finals, the eight qualified teams played in two ties, with the matchups and order of legs determined by the group stage draw and the identity of the best runners-up in the West region.

Team 1	Agg.	Team 2	1st leg	2nd leg
West Region
Al-Arabi (Kuwait)	3–2	(Oman) Al-Seeb	1–0	2–2 (a.e.t.)
East Bengal (India)	1–3	(Turkmenistan) Arkadag	0–1	1–2
East Region
Svay Rieng (Cambodia)	7–4	(Myanmar) Shan United	6–2	1–2
Tainan City (Chinese Taipei)	0–3	(Indonesia) Madura United	0–0	0–3

== AFF Competitions ==
=== Group A ===
Pos	Team	Pld	W	D	L	GF	GA	GD	Pts	Qualification	BGP	PSM	PKS	TNG	DOA	SHU
1	(Thailand) BG Pathum United	5	3	2	0	11	6	+5	11	Advance to Semi-finals			2–1	4–3	1–1	
2	(Indonesia) PSM Makassar	5	3	1	1	8	4	+4	10	Advance to Semi-finals	0–0				3–0	4–3
3	(Cambodia) Preah Khan Reach Svay Rieng	5	2	1	2	8	7	+1	7 (Note: Ranked on head-to-head points: Preah Khan Reach Svay Rieng (3); Terengganu (0).)			0–1				4–2
4	(Malaysia) Terengganu	5	2	1	2	13	9	+4	7			1–0	2–3		2–2	
5	(Vietnam) Dong A Thanh Hoa	5	1	3	1	6	7	−1	6				0–0			3–1
6	(Myanmar) Shan United	5	0	0	5	7	20	−13	0		1–4			0–5		

Source: ASEAN United FC
Rules for classification: Tiebreakers
