= Rafli =

Rafli is an Indonesian name. Notable people with the name include:

- Rafli Asrul (born 2003), Indonesian footballer
- Rafli Mursalim (born 1999), Indonesian footballer
- Muhammad Rafli (born 1998), Indonesian footballer
