= Hoàng Công Hậu =

Vietnamese footballer (born 2007)

Personal information
- Full name: Hoàng Công Hậu
- Date of birth: 26 August 2007 (age 19)
- Place of birth: Haiphong, Vietnam
- Height: 1.71 m (5 ft 7 in)
- Position: Forward

Team information
- Current team: Huế (on loan from Thể Công-Viettel)
- Number: 11

Youth career
- 2016–2020: Hải Dương
- 2020–2025: Thể Công-Viettel

Senior career*
Years	Team	Apps	(Gls)
2025–	Thể Công-Viettel	0	(0)
2025	→ PVF-CAND B (loan)	10	(2)
2026–	→ Huế (loan)	12	(2)

International career^{‡}
2022–2023	Vietnam U17	7	(3)
2026–	Vietnam U20	6	(4)
- * Club domestic league appearances and goals as of 21 November 2026 ‡ National team caps and goals as of 6 September 2026

Hoàng Công Hậu (born 26 August 2007) is a Vietnamese professional footballer who plays as a forward for V.League 2 club Huế, on loan from Thể Công-Viettel.

== Club career ==
Công Hậu began his youth career at Hải Dương. After finishing as the second best goalscorer in the National U-13 Championship, Công Hậu was recruited to the Viettel academy.

In 2026, Công Hậu was loaned to Huế and helped the club gain promotion to the 2026–27 V.League 2. His loan was extended one more season.

== International career ==
With Vietnam U17, Công Hậu participated in the 2022 AFF U-16 Youth Championship and 2023 AFC U-17 Asian Cup.

In June 2026, Công Hậu scored a hattrick for Vietnam U19 in the 2026 ASEAN U-19 Boys' Championship group stage, helping the team defeat Timor-Leste 3–0.

== Career statistics ==
As of match played 21 November 2026

Appearances and goals by club, season and competition
Club	Season	League			Cup		Other		Total	
Club	Season	Division	Apps	Goals	Apps	Goals	Apps	Goals	Apps	Goals
PVF-CAND B (loan)	2025	Second Division	10	2	—		—		10	2
Huế (loan)	2026	Second Division	5	0	—		1 (Note: Appearances in Second Division promotion play-offs)	0	6	0
Huế (loan)	2026–27	V.League 2	7	2	1	0	—		8	2
Huế (loan)	Total		12	2	1	0	1	0	14	2
Career total			22	4	1	0	1	0	24	4

== Honours ==
Vietnam U16

- AFF U-16 Championship runner-up: 2022
