= Dzaky Asraf =

Indonesian footballer

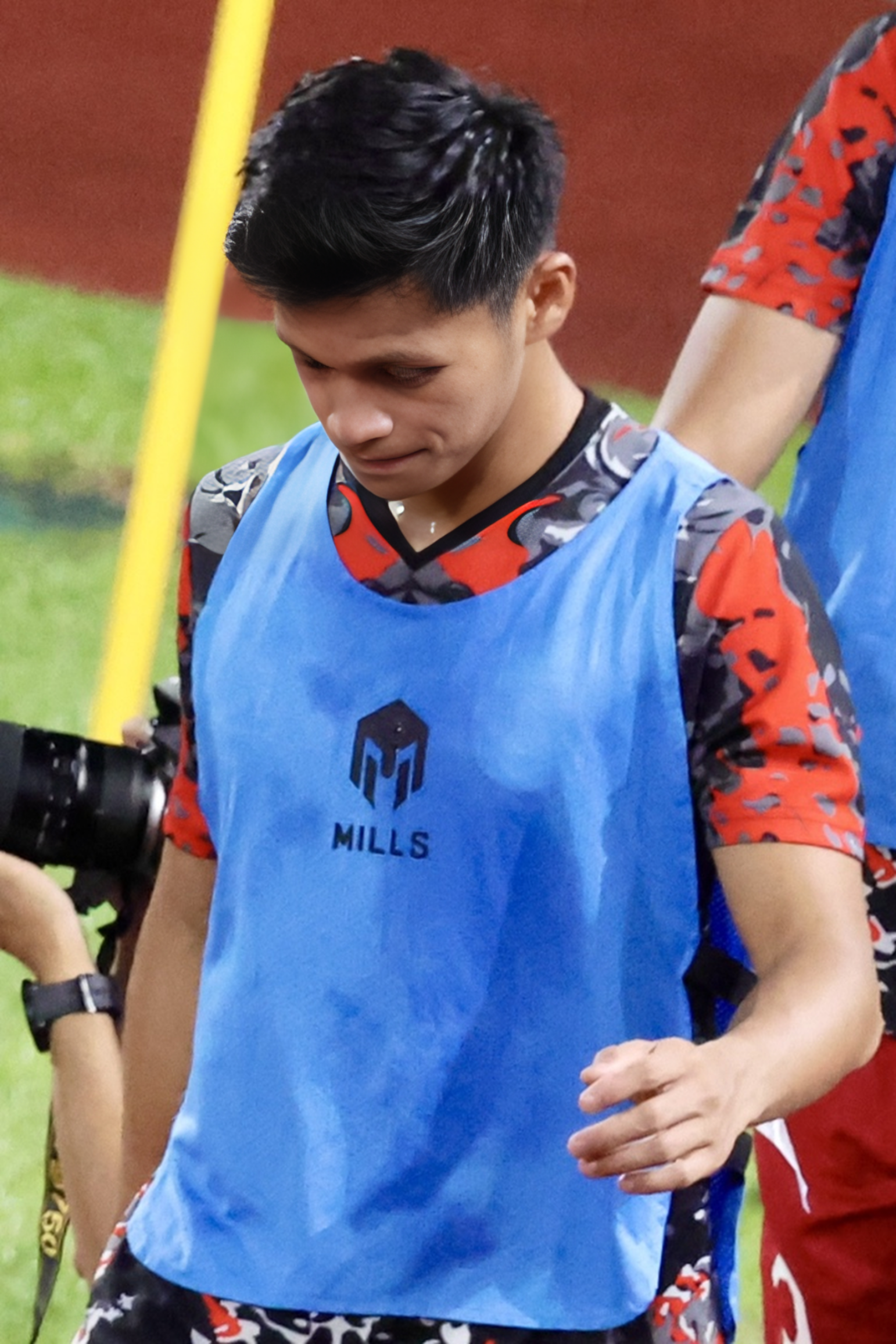
- Dzaky with Indonesia in 2023

Personal information
- Full name: Muhammad Dzaky Asraf Huwaidi Syam
- Date of birth: 6 February 2003 (age 23)
- Place of birth: Polewali Mandar, Indonesia
- Height: 1.70 m (5 ft 7 in)
- Positions: Winger; right-back

Team information
- Current team: Persik Kediri
- Number: 22

Youth career
- SSB Majene
- 2019–2021: PSM Makassar

Senior career*
Years	Team	Apps	(Gls)
2022–2026	PSM Makassar	65	(0)
2026–	Persik Kediri	4	(0)

International career^{‡}
2022–2023	Indonesia U20	11	(0)
2025	Indonesia U23	1	(0)
- * Club domestic league appearances and goals as of 31 October 2026 ‡ National team caps and goals as of 13 October 2025 (UTC)

Muhammad Dzaky Asraf Huwaidi Syam (born 6 February 2003) is an Indonesian professional footballer who plays as a winger or right-back for Super League club Persik Kediri.

== Club career ==
=== PSM Makassar ===
He was signed for PSM Makassar to play in Liga 1 in the 2022 season. Dzaky made his league debut on 23 July 2022 in a match against PSS Sleman at the Maguwoharjo Stadium, Sleman.

== International career ==
On 28 October 2022, Dzaky made his first cap for the Indonesia U-20 national team for a friendly match against Turkey U-20 in a 1–2 loss. He received a call to join the senior team in November 2022 as a preliminary squad for 2022 AFF Championship.

In March 2023, Dzaky was called up by Indonesian manager Shin Tae-yong for two friendly matches against Burundi.

On 25 November 2024, Dzaky received a called up to the preliminary squad to the Indonesia national team for the 2024 ASEAN Championship.

== Career statistics ==
=== Club ===
As of 31 October 2026.

Club	Season	League			Cup		Continental		Other		Total	
Club	Season	Division	Apps	Goals	Apps	Goals	Apps	Goals	Apps	Goals	Apps	Goals
PSM Makassar	2022–23	Liga 1	21	0	0	0	4 (Note: Appearances in AFC Cup)	0	2 (Note: Appearances in Indonesia President's Cup)	0	27	0
PSM Makassar	2023–24	Liga 1	22	0	0	0	5	0	0	0	27	0
PSM Makassar	2024–25	Liga 1	9	0	0	0	–		2 (Note: Appearances in ASEAN Club Championship)	0	11	0
PSM Makassar	2025–26	Super League	5	0	0	0	–		0	0	5	0
Persik Kediri	2026–27	Super League	4	0	0	0	0	0	0	0	4	0
Career total			61	0	0	0	9	0	4	0	74	0

== Honours ==
PSM Makassar

- Liga 1: 2022–23

Individual

- Liga 1 Young Player of the Month: December 2022
