= Kafiatur Rizky =

Indonesian footballer

Personal information
- Full name: Muhammad Kafiatur Rizky
- Date of birth: 17 July 2006 (age 20)
- Place of birth: South Tangerang, Indonesia
- Height: 1.72 m (5 ft 8 in)
- Position: Central midfielder

Team information
- Current team: Dewa United Banten

Youth career
- –2016: Bina Sentra
- 2016–: Borneo Samarinda

Senior career*
Years	Team	Apps	(Gls)
2023–2024	Borneo Samarinda	0	(0)
2023–2024	→ Dewa United (loan)	0	(0)
2024–	Dewa United Banten	4	(1)

International career^{‡}
2022–2023	Indonesia U17	12	(3)
2023–2024	Indonesia U20	8	(2)
Medal record
Men's football
Representing Indonesia
ASEAN U-16 Boys Championship
Winner	2022 Indonesia
ASEAN U-19 Boys Championship
Winner	2024 Indonesia	Team
- * Club domestic league appearances and goals as of 7 February 2026 ‡ National team caps and goals as of 29 July 2024

Muhammad Kafiatur Rizky (born 17 July 2006) is an Indonesian professional footballer who plays as a central midfielder for Super League club Dewa United Banten and the Indonesia national under-20 team.

== Personal life ==
Kafiatur was born in South Tangerang in Banten. His father, Firmansyah is a former footballer who played for PSJS South Jakarta (now known as Jaksel Football Club) from 1997 to 1999 and Persikota Tangerang.

== Club career ==
Kafiatur's football career began by joining Bina Sentra FA, owned by Firman Utina.

Kafiatur later on recruited by the Borneo youth team, where he played for the U-16 team in the Elite Pro Academy.

In July 2023, Dewa United loaned Kafiatur from Borneo. However, he never got the chance to play until he finally returned to Borneo FC in June 2024.

== International career ==
Kafiatur made his debut in for Indonesia U17 at the 2022 AFF U-16 Youth Championship. He stood out and became the mainstay of the midfield for Bima Sakti in squad which he scored 3 goals in the tournament, as he also became the sole goalscorer in the final match against Vietnam and helped the team emerge as champions.

Kafiatur received a call-up by Indra Sjafri for the Indonesia U20 team. On January 30, 2024, Kafiatur scored his first goal for the U20 team in a friendly match against Uzbekistan U20.

Kafiatur participates at the 2024 ASEAN U-19 Boys Championship tournament.

== Career statistics ==
=== International goals ===
International under-17 goals

As of 12 August 2022

No.	Date	Venue	Opponent	Score	Result	Competition
1.	3 August 2022	Maguwoharjo Stadium, Indonesia	Singapore	5–0	9–0	2022 AFF U-16 Youth Championship
2.	3 August 2022	Maguwoharjo Stadium, Indonesia	Singapore	6–0	9–0	2022 AFF U-16 Youth Championship
3.	12 August 2022	Maguwoharjo Stadium, Indonesia	Vietnam	1–0	1–0	2022 AFF U-16 Youth Championship

International under-20 goals

As of 23 July 2024

No.	Date	Venue	Opponent	Score	Result	Competition
1.	30 January 2024	Gelora Madya Stadium, Indonesia	Uzbekistan	1–1	2–3	Friendly
2.	23 July 2024	Gelora Bung Tomo Stadium, Indonesia	Timor-Leste	6–1	6–2	2024 ASEAN U-19 Boys Championship

== Honours ==
=== International ===
Indonesia U-17

- ASEAN U-16 Boys Championship: 2022

Indonesia U-19

- ASEAN U-19 Boys Championship: 2024
