= Ji Da-bin =

Indonesian footballer (born 2006)

Personal information
- Full name: Ji Da-bin
- Date of birth: 3 March 2006 (age 20)
- Place of birth: Depok, Indonesia
- Height: 1.76 m (5 ft 9 in)
- Positions: Attacking midfielder; forward

Team information
- Current team: De Red
- Number: 14

Youth career
- 2018: Cipta Cendikia
- 2018–2024: ASIOP
- 2024–2026: Bhayangkara

Senior career*
Years	Team	Apps	(Gls)
2026–	De Red	2	(0)

International career^{‡}
2022–2023	Indonesia U17	3	(1)
2024–	Indonesia U20	4	(1)
Medal record
Men's football
Representing Indonesia
ASEAN U-16 Boys Championship
Winner	2022 Indonesia
- * Club domestic league appearances and goals as of 11 October 2026 ‡ National team caps and goals as of 30 August 2024

- Ji Da-bin
- Hangul: 지다빈
- RR: Ji Dabin
- MR: Chi Tabin

Ji Da-bin (Korean: 지다빈; born 3 March 2006) is an Indonesian footballer who plays as an attacking midfielder and forward for Championship club De Red and the Indonesia national under-20 team.

== Early life ==
Ji was born in Depok, West Java to a South Korean father.

== Club career ==
Ji trialled at the Son Football Academy, set up by South Korean international footballer Son Heung-min, at the age of nine, but would ultimately remain in Indonesia with ASIOP.

In 2024, Ji joined Bhayangkara. Although he was included in the senior squad, he did not make any official appearances for the first team because a knee injury temporarily derailed her career. He suffered a grade-three ACL and meniscus injury, which sidelined her for quite some time. That injury was also the reason why Ji fell behind his teammates in terms of entering professional competition.

Ahead of the 2025–26 season, he returned from injury and is rebuilding his career with Bhayangkara, which is preparing for the new season.

In mid-2026, Ji departed Bhayangkara and signed with newly formed Surabaya-based club De Red ahead of the 2026–27 season. Ji made his professional debut for the club on 2 October 2026, in a 1–3 home lose over Persipura Jayapura at the Gelora 10 November Stadium, he played the entire first half before being replaced by Mochammad Supriadi early in the second half, in the 47th minute.

== International career ==
Ji was first called up to the Indonesia under-16 side for training camps in 2021. He was called up to the squad again for the 2022 AFF U-16 Youth Championship. Having been named best player at the 2023 Garuda International Cup with his club, ASIOP, Ji was called up to the under-17 squad by manager Bima Sakti for a training camp from July to August 2023.

Ji was included in the 2023 FIFA U-17 World Cup final squad.

In December 2023, Ji got called up to the Indonesia under-20 team by head coach Indra Sjafri to a training camp in Jakarta.

In June 2024, he took part in the Maurice Revello Tournament in France. with Indonesia.

== Career statistics ==
=== Club ===
As of 11 October 2026.

Club	Season	League			Cup		Continental		Other		Total	
Club	Season	Division	Apps	Goals	Apps	Goals	Apps	Goals	Apps	Goals	Apps	Goals
De Red	2026–27	Championship	2	0	0	0	–		0	0	2	0
Career total			2	0	0	0	0	0	0	0	2	0

=== International goals ===
International under-17 goals

As of 3 October 2022

No.	Date	Venue	Opponent	Score	Result	Competition
1.	3 October 2022	Pakansari Stadium, Indonesia	Guam	14–0	14–0	2023 AFC U-17 Asian Cup qualification

International under-20 goals

As of 25 March 2024

No.	Date	Venue	Opponent	Score	Result	Competition
1.	25 March 2024	Gelora Madya Stadium, Indonesia	China	1–1	1–1	Friendly

== Honours ==
=== International ===
Indonesia U-16

- AFF U-16 Youth Championship: 2022
