= 2022 AFF U-16 Youth Championship =

Kejuaraan Remaja U-16 AFF 2022

Tournament details
- Host country: Indonesia
- Cities: Sleman and Bantul
- Dates: 31 July – 12 August
- Teams: 12 (from 1 sub-confederation)
- Venues: 2 (in 2 host cities)

Final positions
- Champions: Indonesia (2nd title)
- Runners-up: Vietnam
- Third place: Thailand
- Fourth place: Myanmar

Tournament statistics
- Matches played: 22
- Goals scored: 91 (4.14 per match)
- Attendance: 45,206 (2,055 per match)
- Top scorer(s): (Thailand) Tontawan Puntamunee (5 goals)
- Best player: (Indonesia) Iqbal Gwijangge
- Best goalkeeper: (Thailand) Tissanu Khuptanawin

The 2022 AFF U-16 Championship was the fifteenth edition of the AFF U-16 Youth Championship, the annual international youth association football championship organised by the ASEAN Football Federation for men's under-16 national teams of Southeast Asia. It was hosted by Indonesia from 31 July to 12 August 2022. Twelve member associations of the ASEAN Football Federation competed in the tournament featuring three groups of four teams. The planned 2020 and 2021 AFF U-16 Youth Championship were cancelled due to COVID-19 pandemic in Southeast Asia. Players born after 1 January 2006 could participate in this tournament.

Indonesia beat Vietnam 1–0 in the final for their second title in the championship.

== Participant teams ==
There was no qualification, and all entrants advanced to the final tournament. The following 12 teams from member associations of the ASEAN Football Federation entered the tournament.

| Team | Association | App | Previous best performance |
|---|---|---|---|
| Australia | Football Australia | 8th | Winners (2008, 2016) |
| Brunei | FA Brunei DS | 9th | Group stage (8 times) |
| Cambodia | FF Cambodia | 11th | Fourth place (2016) |
| Indonesia (H) | FA Indonesia | 11th | Winners (2018) |
| Laos | Lao FF | 13th | Runners-up (2002, 2007, 2011) |
| Malaysia | FA Malaysia | 12th | Winners (2013, 2019) |
| Myanmar | Myanmar FF | 12th | Winners (2002, 2005) |
| Philippines | Philippine FF | 9th | Group stage (8 times) |
| Singapore | FA Singapore | 11th | Fourth place (2008, 2011) |
| Thailand | FA Thailand | 11th | Winners (2007, 2011, 2015) |
| Timor-Leste | FF Timor-Leste | 8th | Third place (2010) |
| Vietnam | Vietnam FF | 13th | Winners (2006, 2010, 2017) |

== Venues ==
On 15 July 2022, the Football Association of Indonesia (PSSI) officially announced the 2 venues for the tournament which was located in the Special Region of Yogyakarta.

| Sleman | Bantul |
|---|---|
| Maguwoharjo Stadium | Sultan Agung Stadium |
| Capacity: 31,700 | Capacity: 35,000 |
2022 AFF U-16 Youth Championship is located in Java

== Draw ==
| Pot 1 | Pot 2 | Pot 3 | Pot 4 |
|---|---|---|---|
| Indonesia (H); Malaysia; Thailand | Vietnam; Timor-Leste; Australia | Laos; Singapore; Myanmar | Cambodia; Brunei; Philippines |

- (H): Tournament host

== Group stage ==
- All times listed are WIB (UTC+7).

=== Group A ===
| Pos | Team | Pld | W | D | L | GF | GA | GD | Pts | Qualification |
|---|---|---|---|---|---|---|---|---|---|---|
| 1 | Indonesia (H) | 3 | 3 | 0 | 0 | 13 | 0 | +13 | 9 | Knockout stage |
| 2 | Vietnam | 3 | 2 | 0 | 1 | 10 | 3 | +7 | 6 | Knockout stage |
| 3 | Philippines | 3 | 1 | 0 | 2 | 2 | 8 | −6 | 3 | |
| 4 | Singapore | 3 | 0 | 0 | 3 | 2 | 16 | −14 | 0 | |

Source: ASEAN Football
Rules for classification: Group stage tiebreakers
(H) Hosts
31 July 2022
15:00

| Vietnam | 5–1 | Singapore |
|---|---|---|
| Nguyễn Hữu Trọng 9'; Phan Thanh Đức Thiện 23', 53'; Nguyễn Xuân Toàn 45+2'; Hoàng Công Hậu 90+3' | Report | Rasul 45+1' |

Sultan Agung Stadium, Bantul
Attendance: 77
Referee: Pansa Chaisanit (Thailand)
31 July 2022
20:00

| Indonesia | 2–0 | Philippines |
|---|---|---|
| Peña 3' (o.g.); Arkhan 37' | Report |

Maguwoharjo Stadium, Sleman
Attendance: 1,439
Referee: Warinton Sassadee (Thailand)

3 August 2022
15:00

| Philippines | 0–5 | Vietnam |
|---|---|---|
| | Report | Phan Thanh Đức Thiện 38', 55'; Lê Đình Long Vũ 43'; Hoàng Công Hậu 57', 72' |

Sultan Agung Stadium, Bantul
Attendance: 79
Referee: Abdul Hakim Mohd Haidi (Brunei)
3 August 2022
20:00

| Singapore | 0–9 | Indonesia |
|---|---|---|
| | Report | Nabil 3', 18', 30'; Hanif 20'; Kafiatur 35', 43'; Riski A. 59'; Waliy 79' (pen.); Ananta 90+1' |

Maguwoharjo Stadium, Sleman
Attendance: 1,759
Referee: Xaypaseuth Phongsanit (Laos)

6 August 2022
20:00

| Singapore | 1–2 | Philippines |
|---|---|---|
| Jonan 70' | Report | Alayon 48'; Yoldi 88' |

Sultan Agung Stadium, Bantul
Attendance: 65
Referee: Pansa Chaisanit (Thailand)
6 August 2022
20:00

| Indonesia | 2–0 | Vietnam |
|---|---|---|
| Arkhan 51'; Nabil 55' | Report |

Maguwoharjo Stadium, Sleman
Attendance: 8,000
Referee: Warinton Sassadee (Thailand)

=== Group B ===
| Pos | Team | Pld | W | D | L | GF | GA | GD | Pts | Qualification |
|---|---|---|---|---|---|---|---|---|---|---|
| 1 | Thailand | 3 | 2 | 1 | 0 | 10 | 2 | +8 | 7 | Knockout stage |
| 2 | Laos | 3 | 1 | 2 | 0 | 12 | 2 | +10 | 5 | |
| 3 | Timor-Leste | 3 | 1 | 1 | 1 | 12 | 5 | +7 | 4 | |
| 4 | Brunei | 3 | 0 | 0 | 3 | 0 | 25 | −25 | 0 | |

Source: ASEAN Football
Rules for classification: Group stage tiebreakers
1 August 2022
15:00

| Timor-Leste | 1–1 | Laos |
|---|---|---|
| Mota 84' | Report | Sisavath 10' |

Sultan Agung Stadium, Bantul
Attendance: 76
Referee: Meliton Pelayo (Philippines)
1 August 2022
19:00

| Thailand | 5–0 | Brunei |
|---|---|---|
| Tontawan 20', 34'; Anumat 44'; Phantawat 53'; Kitiphat 79' | Report |

Maguwoharjo Stadium, Sleman
Attendance: 25
Referee: Fariq Hitaba (Indonesia)

4 August 2022
15:00

| Brunei | 0–10 | Timor-Leste |
|---|---|---|
| | Report | Lemos 34', 38', 65', 74'; Silva 52'; Ashrul 54' (o.g.); Mota 55'; Pires 76'; Santos 79'; Amaral 86' |

Sultan Agung Stadium, Bantul
Attendance: 89
Referee: Lim Bunthoeun (Cambodia)
4 August 2022
19:00

| Laos | 1–1 | Thailand |
|---|---|---|
| Songkan 19' | Report | Jirapol 58' |

Maguwoharjo Stadium, Sleman
Attendance: 75
Referee: Sance Lawita (Indonesia)

7 August 2022
15:00

| Laos | 10–0 | Brunei |
|---|---|---|
| Thanousack 10', 29', 67', 71'; Sayfone 26' (pen.), 36', 53', 57'; Xayxana 68', 87' | Report |

Sultan Agung Stadium, Bantul
Attendance: 43
Referee: Meliton Pelayo (Philippines)
7 August 2022
15:00

| Thailand | 4–1 | Timor-Leste |
|---|---|---|
| Kritakan 9'; Jirapol 17'; Tontawan 50', 64' | Report | Carvalho 46' |

Maguwoharjo Stadium, Sleman
Attendance: 141
Referee: Lim Bunthoeun (Cambodia)

=== Group C ===
| Pos | Team | Pld | W | D | L | GF | GA | GD | Pts | Qualification |
|---|---|---|---|---|---|---|---|---|---|---|
| 1 | Myanmar | 3 | 2 | 1 | 0 | 5 | 3 | +2 | 7 | Knockout stage |
| 2 | Malaysia | 3 | 1 | 2 | 0 | 6 | 3 | +3 | 5 | |
| 3 | Cambodia | 3 | 1 | 0 | 2 | 4 | 6 | −2 | 3 | |
| 4 | Australia | 3 | 0 | 1 | 2 | 6 | 9 | −3 | 1 | |

Source: ASEAN Football
Rules for classification: Group stage tiebreakers
2 August 2022
15:00

| Australia | 2–3 | Myanmar |
|---|---|---|
| Coveny 39'; Di Pizio 44' | Report | Saw Myo Zaw 3'; Shine Wanna Aung 23'; Pyae Sone Aung 72' |

Sultan Agung Stadium, Bantul
Attendance: 33
Referee: Thoriq Munir Alkatiri (Indonesia)
2 August 2022
19:00

| Malaysia | 3–0 | Cambodia |
|---|---|---|
| Arami 6'; Faris 59', 78' | Report |

Maguwoharjo Stadium, Sleman
Attendance: 45
Referee: Khamsing Xaiyavongsy (Laos)

5 August 2022
15:00

| Cambodia | 4–2 | Australia |
|---|---|---|
| Var David 1'; Sou Menghong 24', 90+2'; Soun Makara 74' | Report | Gulasi 38' (pen.); Hately 82' |

Sultan Agung Stadium, Bantul
Attendance: 26
Referee: Mick Jon Pineda (Philippines)
5 August 2022
19:00

| Myanmar | 1–1 | Malaysia |
|---|---|---|
| Kaung Khant Zaw 50' | Report | Dainei 2' |

Maguwoharjo Stadium, Sleman
Attendance: 91
Referee: Thoriq Munir Alkatiri (Indonesia)

8 August 2022
15:00

| Myanmar | 1–0 | Cambodia |
|---|---|---|
| Lin Htet Oo 48' (pen.) | Report |

Sultan Agung Stadium, Bantul
Attendance: 51
Referee: Sance Lawita (Indonesia)
8 August 2022
15:00

| Malaysia | 2–2 | Australia |
|---|---|---|
| Anjasmirza 36', 49' | Report | Gulasi 17'; Hately 65' |

Maguwoharjo Stadium, Sleman
Attendance: 35
Referee: Fariq Hitaba (Indonesia)

=== Ranking of runner-up teams ===
The best runner-up team from three groups advanced to the knockout stage.

| Pos | Grp | Team | Pld | W | D | L | GF | GA | GD | Pts | Qualification |
|---|---|---|---|---|---|---|---|---|---|---|---|
| 1 | A | Vietnam | 3 | 2 | 0 | 1 | 11 | 3 | +8 | 6 | Knockout stage |
| 2 | B | Laos | 3 | 1 | 2 | 0 | 12 | 2 | +10 | 5 | |
| 3 | C | Malaysia | 3 | 1 | 2 | 0 | 6 | 3 | +3 | 5 | |

Source: ASEAN Football
Rules for classification: 1) Points; 2) Goal difference; 3) Goals scored; 4) Drawing of lots.

== Knockout stage ==
In the knockout stage, the penalty shoot-out was used to decide the winner if necessary.

=== Bracket ===
Semi-finals
10 August – Sleman
Thailand | 0
Vietnam | 2
10 August – Sleman
Indonesia (p) | 1 (5)
Myanmar | 1 (4)

Final
12 August – Sleman
Vietnam | 0
Indonesia | 1
Third place match
12 August – Sleman
Thailand | 3
Myanmar | 0

=== Semi-finals ===
10 August 2022
15:30

| Thailand | 0–2 | Vietnam |
|---|---|---|
| | Report | Nguyễn Công Phương 30'; Nguyễn Trọng Tuấn 83' |

Maguwoharjo Stadium, Sleman
Attendance: 140
Referee: Thoriq Alkatiri (Indonesia)
10 August 2022
20:00

| Indonesia | 1–1 | Myanmar |
|---|---|---|
| Riski A. 69' | Report | Nay Min Htet 44' |
Penalties
| Iqbal (penalty scored); Figo (penalty scored); Arkhan (penalty scored); Riski A. (penalty scored); Nabil (penalty scored) | 5–4 | (penalty scored) Kaung Khant Zaw; (penalty scored) Brang Don Le; (penalty scored) Khone Cho Htoo; (penalty missed) Shine Wanna Aung; (penalty scored) Myat Phone Khant |

Maguwoharjo Stadium, Sleman
Attendance: 9,427
Referee: Abdul Hakim Mohd Haidi (Brunei)

=== Third place match ===
12 August 2022
15:30

| Thailand | 3–0 | Myanmar |
|---|---|---|
| Tontawan 70'; Chanasorn 83'; Ritikan 90+3' | Report |

Maguwoharjo Stadium, Sleman
Attendance: 911
Referee: Abdul Hakim Mohd Haidi (Brunei)

=== Final ===
12 August 2022
20:00

| Vietnam | 0–1 | Indonesia |
|---|---|---|
| | Report | Kafiatur 45+2' |

Maguwoharjo Stadium, Sleman
Attendance: 22,579
Referee: Xaypaseuth Phongsanit (Laos)

== Winner ==
2022 AFF U-16 Youth Championship winners

Indonesia
Second title

== Awards ==
| Most Valuable Player | Top Scorer Award | Best Goalkeeper Award |
|---|---|---|
| (Indonesia) Iqbal Gwijangge | (Thailand) Tontawan Puntamunee | (Thailand) Tissanu Khuptanawin |

== Goalscorers ==
There were 91 goals scored in 22 matches, for an average of 4.14 goals per match.

5 goals

- (Thailand) Tontawan Puntamunee

4 goals

- (Indonesia) Nabil Asyura
- (Laos) Sayfon Keohanam
- (Laos) Thanousack Nanthavongdouansy
- (Timor-Leste) Alexandro Lemos
- (Vietnam) Phan Thanh Đức Thiện

3 goals

- (Indonesia) Kafiatur Rizky
- (Vietnam) Hoàng Công Hậu

2 goals

- (Australia) Ayman Gulasi
- (Australia) Max Hately
- (Cambodia) Sou Menghong
- (Indonesia) Arkhan Kaka
- (Indonesia) Riski Afrisal
- (Laos) Xayxana Sihalath
- (Malaysia) Faris Mohd Asrul
- (Malaysia) Anjasmirza Saharuddin
- (Thailand) Jirapol Saelio
- (Timor-Leste) Norbert Mota
- (Vietnam) Nguyễn Công Phương

1 goal

- (Australia) Luka Coveny
- (Australia) Miguel Di Pizio
- (Cambodia) Soun Makara
- (Cambodia) Var David
- (Indonesia) I Komang Ananta Krisna
- (Indonesia) Hanif Ramadhan
- (Indonesia) Waliy Ma'rifat
- (Laos) Sisavath Keomoungkhoun
- (Laos) Songkan Liyasak
- (Malaysia) Arami Zakimi
- (Malaysia) Dainei Mat Disa
- (Myanmar) Kaung Khant Zaw
- (Myanmar) Lin Htet Oo
- (Myanmar) Nay Min Htet
- (Myanmar) Pyae Sone Aung
- (Myanmar) Saw Myo Zaw
- (Myanmar) Shine Wanna Aung
- (Philippines) Arvin Alayon
- (Philippines) Julio Yoldi
- (Singapore) Jonan Tan
- (Singapore) Rasul Ramli
- (Thailand) Anumat Seewongkaew
- (Thailand) Chanasorn Choklap
- (Thailand) Kitiphat Boondaung
- (Thailand) Kritakan Rungrotbenjaphon
- (Thailand) Phantawat Khetchompoo
- (Thailand) Ritikan Rungrotbenjaphon
- (Timor-Leste) Totifanio Amaral
- (Timor-Leste) Luis da Silva
- (Timor-Leste) Marques de Carvalho
- (Timor-Leste) Jeremias dos Santos
- (Timor-Leste) Vabio Pires
- (Vietnam) Lê Đình Long Vũ
- (Vietnam) Nguyễn Hữu Trọng
- (Vietnam) Nguyễn Trọng Tuấn
- (Vietnam) Nguyễn Xuân Toàn

1 own goal

- (Brunei) Arshrul Irfan (against Timor-Leste)
- (Philippines) Jared Peña (against Indonesia)

== Final ranking ==
This table will show the ranking of teams throughout the tournament.

| Pos | Team | Pld | W | D | L | GF | GA | GD | Pts | Final result |
|---|---|---|---|---|---|---|---|---|---|---|
| 1 | Indonesia (H) | 5 | 4 | 1 | 0 | 15 | 2 | +13 | 13 | Champion |
| 2 | Vietnam | 5 | 3 | 0 | 2 | 13 | 4 | +9 | 9 | Runner up |
| 3 | Thailand | 5 | 3 | 1 | 1 | 13 | 4 | +9 | 10 | Third place |
| 4 | Myanmar | 5 | 2 | 2 | 1 | 6 | 7 | −1 | 8 | Fourth place |
| 5 | Laos | 3 | 1 | 2 | 0 | 12 | 2 | +10 | 5 | Eliminated in group stage |
| 6 | Malaysia | 3 | 1 | 2 | 0 | 6 | 3 | +3 | 5 | Eliminated in group stage |
| 7 | Timor-Leste | 3 | 1 | 1 | 1 | 12 | 5 | +7 | 4 | Eliminated in group stage |
| 8 | Cambodia | 3 | 1 | 0 | 2 | 4 | 6 | −2 | 3 | Eliminated in group stage |
| 9 | Philippines | 3 | 1 | 0 | 2 | 2 | 8 | −6 | 3 | Eliminated in group stage |
| 10 | Australia | 3 | 0 | 1 | 2 | 6 | 9 | −3 | 1 | Eliminated in group stage |
| 11 | Singapore | 3 | 0 | 0 | 3 | 2 | 16 | −14 | 0 | Eliminated in group stage |
| 12 | Brunei | 3 | 0 | 0 | 3 | 0 | 25 | −25 | 0 | Eliminated in group stage |

Source: Group stage, Knockout stage
(H) Hosts
