= Arsa Ahmad =

Indonesian footballer (born 2003)

Personal information
- Full name: Arsa Ramadan Ahmad
- Date of birth: 31 October 2003 (age 23)
- Place of birth: Indonesia
- Height: 1.80 m (5 ft 11 in)
- Position: Forward

Team information
- Current team: Persiba Balikpapan
- Number: 91

Youth career
- 2017: Indonesia Soccer Academy
- 2018–2019: Bhayangkara U16
- 2019–2020: Garuda Select
- 2020–2024: Bhayangkara Youth

Senior career*
| Years | Team | Apps | (Gls) |
| 2023–2024 | Bhayangkara | 11 | (1) |
| 2024–2025 | Madura United | 11 | (1) |
| 2025– | Persiba Balikpapan | 12 | (1) |

International career^{‡}
| 2022 | Indonesia U20 | 3 | (0) |
- * Club domestic league appearances and goals as of 22:00, 8 May 2026 (UTC) ‡ National team caps and goals as of 16 September 2022

Arsa Ramadan Ahmad (born 31 October 2003), is an Indonesian professional footballer who plays as a forward for Persiba Balikpapan.

== Club career ==
=== Bhayangkara Presisi Indonesia ===
A product of Bhayangkara youth academy, Arsa made his Liga 1 debut with Bhayangkara Presisi Indonesia in a 0–0 draw against Madura United on 25 August 2023. On 15 September 2023, Arsa scored his first league goal for the team, opening the scoring in a 2–2 away draw against Dewa United.

== International career ==
In September 2022, Arsa was called up to the Indonesia U20 for the training centre in preparation for 2023 AFC U-20 Asian Cup qualification. Arsa made his international debut on 16 September 2022 in the 2023 AFC U-20 Asian Cup qualification match against Hong Kong U20 at Gelora Bung Tomo Stadium, Surabaya.

On 25 November 2024, Arsa received a called up to the preliminary squad to the Indonesia national team for the 2024 ASEAN Championship.

== Career statistics ==
=== Club ===
As of 8 May 2026

| Club | Season | League | | | Cup | | Other | | Total | |
| Club | Season | Division | Apps | Goals | Apps | Goals | Apps | Goals | Apps | Goals |
|---|---|---|---|---|---|---|---|---|---|---|
| Bhayangkara | 2023–24 | Liga 1 | 11 | 1 | 0 | 0 | 0 | 0 | 11 | 1 |
| Madura United | 2024–25 | Liga 1 | 11 | 1 | 0 | 0 | 0 | 0 | 11 | 1 |
| Persiba Balikpapan | 2025–26 | Championship | 12 | 1 | 0 | 0 | 0 | 0 | 12 | 1 |
| Career total | | | 34 | 3 | 0 | 0 | 0 | 0 | 34 | 3 |
