= Arkhan Kaka =

Indonesian footballer

Personal information
- Full name: Arkhan Kaka Putra Purwanto
- Date of birth: 2 September 2007 (age 19)
- Place of birth: Blitar, Indonesia
- Height: 1.87 m (6 ft 2 in)
- Position: Forward

Team information
- Current team: Garudayaksa
- Number: 8

Youth career
- SSB Tunas Muda Blitar
- 2019–2021: PSBK Blitar
- 2021–2022: Bhayangkara
- 2022–: Persis Solo

Senior career*
Years	Team	Apps	(Gls)
2023–2026	Persis Solo	52	(2)
2026–	Garudayaksa	1	(0)

International career^{‡}
2022–2023	Indonesia U17	13	(11)
2023–	Indonesia U20	24	(3)
2024–	Indonesia	3	(0)
Medal record
Men's football
Representing Indonesia
ASEAN U-16 Boys Championship
Winner	2022 Indonesia
ASEAN U-19 Boys Championship
Winner	2024 Indonesia	Team
- * Club domestic league appearances and goals as of 19 September 2026 ‡ National team caps and goals as of 6 September 2026

Arkhan Kaka Putra Purwanto (born 2 September 2007) is an Indonesian professional footballer who plays as a forward for Super League club Garudayaksa and the Indonesia national team.

In 2024, Arkhan was named by English newspaper The Guardian as one of the best players born in 2007 worldwide.

== Club career ==
=== Persis Solo ===
Arkhan joined a Liga 1 club Persis Solo on 1 February 2022. Before he joined Persis Solo, he started his football career at SSB Tunas Muda Blitar. Then, he had time to strengthen Bhayangkara FC at the Elite Pro Academy U-16 2022. He became one of club's top scorers.

He made his first-team debut on 4 April 2023 after replacing Irfan Bachdim in the 70th minute, which ended 3–1 defeat against Persib Bandung at Pakansari Stadium. At just 15 years old, he was recorded as the youngest player in the Indonesian league history from 1994 to 2023.

== International career ==
In the selection process in May 2021, the process of his struggle to enter the national team squad did not go smoothly. His name was even crossed out by the Indonesia under-17 team head coach, Bima Sakti. Luckily in 2022 Elite Pro Academy U16, Arkhan managed to prove his ability, and he passed the selection of the Indonesia under-17 team.

In July 2022, he made his debut on the 2022 AFF U-16 Youth Championship against Philippines U17 which he scored one goal in that match. Arkhan and his national team won in the final stage against Vietnam U-17 and achieved their champion on the tournament which Arkhan scored a total of two goals.

On 5 October 2022, Arkhan scored a quadtrick against Guam U17 in a 14–0 win at the 2023 AFC U-17 Asian Cup qualification.

In January 2023, Arkhan was called up by Shin Tae-Yong to the Indonesia under-20 team for the training centre in preparation for 2023 AFC U-20 Asian Cup. On 17 January 2023, Arkhan made his debut for the team against Fiji U20 in a 4–0 win.

On 10 November 2023, Arkhan scored a goal against Ecuador U-17 in the 2023 FIFA U-17 World Cup group stage, which ended in a 1–1 draw. Thus, Arkhan became the first Indonesian to score a goal in a FIFA World Cup of any age-group. On 13 November 2023, Arkhan scored another goal, this time against Panama U-17 in another 1–1 draw in the group stage.

In June 2024, he took part in the Maurice Revello Tournament in France with Indonesia.

On 25 November 2024, Kaka received a called up to the preliminary squad to the Indonesia national team for the 2024 ASEAN Championship. He made his senior debut against Myanmar in a 1–0 win, he went to became the youngest debutant for the senior team at the age of 17 years and 97 days old. However, this record was broken by Mathew Baker on 5 June 2026.

== Personal life ==
Arkhan Kaka was born in Blitar in East Java. His father, a former footballer who also plays as a striker named Purwanto Suwondo. His father has played for a number of Indonesian clubs, including Arema and Persebaya Surabaya.

== Career statistics ==
=== International appearances ===
International under-17 appearances

As of 13 November 2023

Indonesia national under-17 team
Year	Apps	Goals
2022	9	9
2023	4	2
Total	13	11

International under-20 appearances

As of 11 June 2026

Indonesia national under-20 team
Year	Apps	Goals
2023	2	0
2024	14	1
2025	1	0
2026	4	2
Total	21	3

International senior

As of 21 December 2024

Indonesia national team
Year	Apps	Goals
2024	2	0
Total	2	0

=== International goals ===
International under-17 goals

As of 13 November 2023

No.	Date	Venue	Opponent	Score	Result	Competition
1.	31 July 2022	Maguwoharjo Stadium, Indonesia	Philippines	2–0	2–0	2022 AFF U-16 Youth Championship
2.	6 August 2022	Maguwoharjo Stadium, Indonesia	Vietnam	1–1	2–1	2022 AFF U-16 Youth Championship
3.	3 October 2022	Pakansari Stadium, Indonesia	Guam	1–0	14–0	2023 AFC U-17 Asian Cup qualification
4.	3 October 2022	Pakansari Stadium, Indonesia	Guam	2–0	14–0	2023 AFC U-17 Asian Cup qualification
5.	3 October 2022	Pakansari Stadium, Indonesia	Guam	3–0	14–0	2023 AFC U-17 Asian Cup qualification
6.	3 October 2022	Pakansari Stadium, Indonesia	Guam	6–0	14–0	2023 AFC U-17 Asian Cup qualification
7.	5 October 2022	Pakansari Stadium, Indonesia	United Arab Emirates	2–0	3–2	2023 AFC U-17 Asian Cup qualification
8.	5 October 2022	Pakansari Stadium, Indonesia	United Arab Emirates	3–2	3–2	2023 AFC U-17 Asian Cup qualification
9.	9 October 2022	Pakansari Stadium, Indonesia	Malaysia	1–5	1–5	2023 AFC U-17 Asian Cup qualification
10.	10 November 2023	Gelora Bung Tomo Stadium, Indonesia	Ecuador	1–0	1–1	2023 FIFA U-17 World Cup
11.	13 November 2023	Gelora Bung Tomo Stadium, Indonesia	Panama	1–1	1–1	2023 FIFA U-17 World Cup

International under-20 goals

As of 4 June 2026

No.	Date	Venue	Opponent	Score	Result	Competition
1.	23 July 2024	Gelora Bung Tomo Stadium, Indonesia	Timor-Leste	5–1	6–2	2024 ASEAN U-19 Boys Championship
2.	1 June 2026	North Sumatra Stadium, Indonesia	Myanmar	1–0	3–0	2026 ASEAN U-19 Boys Championship
3.	4 June 2026	North Sumatra Stadium, Indonesia	Timor-Leste	3–0	3–0	2026 ASEAN U-19 Boys Championship

== Honours ==
=== International ===
Indonesia U-16

- ASEAN U-16 Boys Championship
  - Champions : 2022

Indonesia U-19

- ASEAN U-19 Boys Championship
  - Champions : 2024
