= Rafli Asrul =

Indonesian footballer (born 2003)

Personal information
- Full name: Muhammad Rafli Asrul
- Date of birth: 19 February 2003 (age 23)
- Place of birth: Enrekang, Indonesia
- Height: 1.67 m (5 ft 6 in)
- Position: Attacking midfielder

Youth career
- 2015–2019: SSB Maspul Enrekang
- 2019–2021: PSM Makassar
- 2019–2020: Garuda Select

Senior career*
| Years | Team | Apps | (Gls) |
| 2022–2024 | PSM Makassar | 3 | (0) |
| 2023 | → Bekasi City (loan) | 14 | (0) |
| 2024–2025 | Bekasi City | 16 | (2) |

International career^{‡}
| 2022 | Indonesia U20 | 6 | (0) |
- * Club domestic league appearances and goals as of 15 February 2025 ‡ National team caps and goals as of 8 July 2022

Muhammad Rafli Asrul (born 19 February 2003) is an Indonesian professional footballer who plays as an attacking midfielder.

== Club career ==
=== PSM Makassar ===
He was recruited by PSM Makassar U16 in early January 2018. At that time, he was 15 years old. A year later, Asrul was promoted to the PSM Makassar U18 team. Together with his squad, his performances continued to be honed and began to get the attention of many coaches. His potential continues to grow after successfully passing the second volume of the Garuda Select program selection in 2019. He received guidance from Des Walker and Dennis Wise. When participating in the second volume of the Garuda Select program, Asrul was recorded as the player who played the highest number of matches and playing minutes. His performances during that time made Asrul one of the three players who returned to training with the third edition of the Garuda Select program. Asrul made his professional debut on 8 January 2022 in a match against Madura United at the Ngurah Rai Stadium, Denpasar.

== International career ==
On 30 May 2022, Asrul made his debut for an Indonesian youth team against a Venezuela U-20 squad in the 2022 Maurice Revello Tournament in France.

== Career statistics ==
=== Club ===
As of 15 February 2025.

| Club | Season | League | | | Cup | | Continental | | Other | | Total | |
| Club | Season | Division | Apps | Goals | Apps | Goals | Apps | Goals | Apps | Goals | Apps | Goals |
|---|---|---|---|---|---|---|---|---|---|---|---|---|
| PSM Makassar | 2021–22 | Liga 1 | 3 | 0 | 0 | 0 | – | | 0 | 0 | 3 | 0 |
| PSM Makassar | 2022–23 | Liga 1 | 0 | 0 | 0 | 0 | – | | 0 | 0 | 0 | 0 |
| PSM Makassar | 2023–24 | Liga 1 | 0 | 0 | 0 | 0 | 0 | 0 | 0 | 0 | 0 | 0 |
| Bekasi City (loan) | 2023–24 | Liga 2 | 14 | 0 | 0 | 0 | – | | 0 | 0 | 14 | 0 |
| Bekasi City | 2024–25 | Liga 2 | 16 | 2 | 0 | 0 | – | | 0 | 0 | 16 | 2 |
| Career total | | | 33 | 2 | 0 | 0 | 0 | 0 | 0 | 0 | 33 | 2 |

== Honours ==
=== Club ===
PSM Makassar

- Liga 1: 2022–23

=== Individual ===
- Liga 1 U-16 Top Goalscorer: 2019 (14 goals)
