= Iqbal Gwijangge =

Indonesian footballer (born 2006)

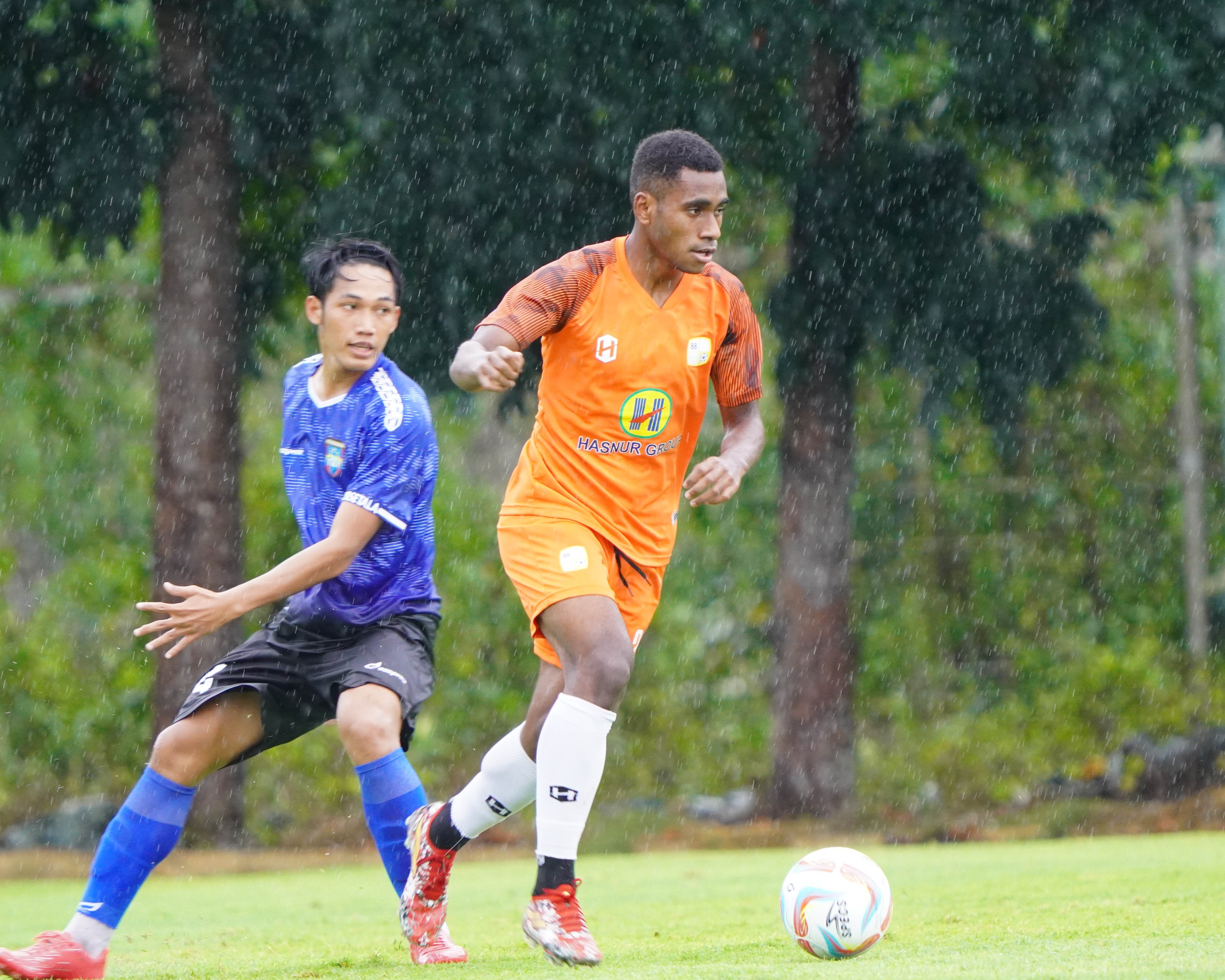
- Gwijangge training with Barito Putra in 2024

Personal information
- Full name: Muhammad Iqbal Gwijangge
- Date of birth: 29 August 2006 (age 20)
- Place of birth: Sumedang, Indonesia
- Height: 1.79 m (5 ft 10 in)
- Position: Centre-back

Team information
- Current team: Barito Putera
- Number: 29

Youth career
- 2019: SSB Sidolig Bandung
- 2020: SSB Saswco Bandung
- 2020–2021: Bandung Pro United
- 2021–2023: Bhayangkara
- 2023: Barito Putera

Senior career*
Years	Team	Apps	(Gls)
2023–	Barito Putera	22	(0)

International career^{‡}
2022–2023	Indonesia U17	12	(0)
2024–	Indonesia U20	19	(4)
Medal record
Men's football
Representing Indonesia
ASEAN U-16 Boys Championship
Winner	2022 Indonesia
ASEAN U-19 Boys Championship
Winner	2024 Indonesia	Team
- * Club domestic league appearances and goals as of 4 October 2026 ‡ National team caps and goals as of 16 February 2025

Muhammad Iqbal Gwijangge (born 29 August 2006) is an Indonesian professional footballer who plays as a centre-back for Liga 2 club Barito Putera.

== Club career ==
Born in Sumedang, Iqbal started his career playing for clubs in Bandung. He joined the youth academy of Bhayangkara in 2021 before signing for Liga 1 side Barito Putera. In early 2023, Gwijangge travelled to Hungary for a training spell with the Puskás Academy as part of his development as a youth player.

== International career ==
In 2022, Iqbal was part of the Indonesia U16 team that won the 2022 AFF U-16 Youth Championship. He was the captain of the team and was the leader of the defense, helping Indonesia keep cleansheat in 3 out of 5 matches during the tournament. Therefore, he was given the "Best player of the tournament" award.

In November 2023, Iqbal was named in Indonesia U17's team for the 2023 FIFA U-17 World Cup, hosted in his home country Indonesia. He started in all three group stage matches and helped Indonesia drew two games but the team failed to advance to the next stage.

Gwijangge was called by coach Indra Sjafri to the Indonesia U20 team to participate at the 2024 Maurice Revello Tournament.

== Honours ==
Indonesia U16

- ASEAN U-16 Boys Championship: 2022

Indonesia U19

- ASEAN U-19 Boys Championship: 2024

Individual

- ASEAN U-16 Boys Championship Best Player: 2022
