= Maguwoharjo Stadium =

Football stadium in Sleman, Indonesia

Stadion Maguwoharjo
- Javanese: ꦱꦼꦠꦝꦶꦪꦺꦴꦤ꧀ꦩꦒꦸꦮꦲꦂꦗ _{Setadhiyon Maguwaharja}
- Little San Siro; Indonesian San Siro
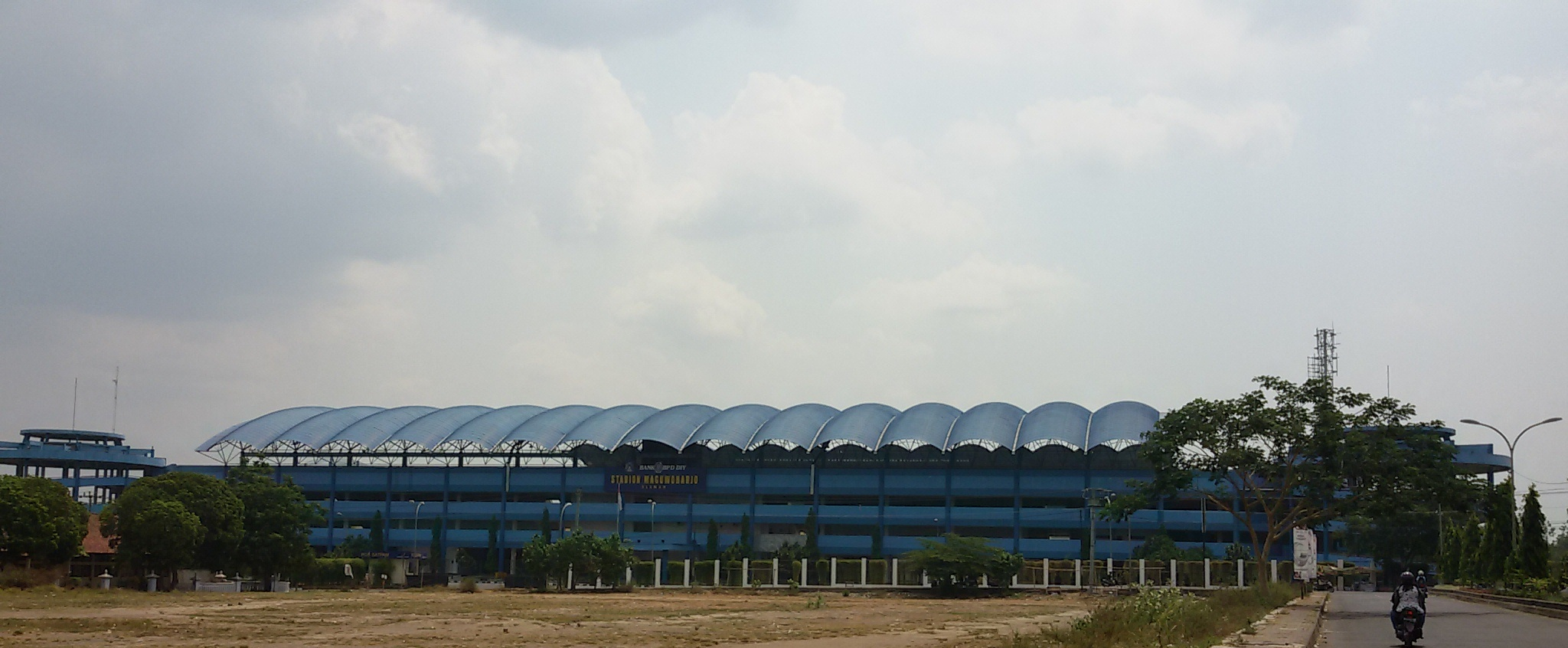
- Interactive map of Stadion Maguwoharjo
- Full name: Stadion Maguwoharjo Sleman
- Location: Maguwoharjo, Sleman Regency, Special Region of Yogyakarta
- Coordinates: 7°45′02″S 110°25′06″E
- Owner: Government of Sleman Regency
- Operator: PSS Sleman
- Capacity: 35,000 (2007–2023); 20,651 (2024–present)
- Surface: Zoysia matrella

Construction
- Built: 2005
- Opened: 2007
- Renovated: 2023–2024

Tenants
- PSS Sleman (2007–present); PSBS Biak (2025)

Maguwoharjo Stadium a.k.a. “Little San Siro" or “Indonesian San Siro", is a football stadium in Sleman Regency, Special Region of Yogyakarta, Indonesia. It is the home of PSS Sleman. The stadium has capacity of 20,651, and is located 9 kilometers away from the Adisucipto International Airport.

== History ==
Stadium entrance

Maguwoharjo Stadium was built in 2005 until 2007. It was owned by the Government of Sleman Regency. It is mostly used for football matches and it is the home of Liga 1 club PSS Sleman. In December 2023, Maguwoharjo Stadium was renovated by the Ministry of Public Works (Indonesia), the rehabilitation and renovation of this stadium is expected to create high-quality sports facilities and infrastructure in accordance with FIFA standards for the comfort of players and spectators during the match. The stadium capacity was reduced after the renovation with the addition of single seats from a capacity of 35,000 to 20,594. The stadium renovation is targeted for completion in December 2024.

== International matches ==
Date	Competition	Team	Res	Team	Crowd
9 September 2014	International Friendly	Indonesia	0–0	Yemen	N/A
4 November 2016	International Friendly	Indonesia	2–2	Vietnam	22,167
13 June 2017	International Friendly	Indonesia	0–0	Puerto Rico	16,592
26 November 2025	FIFA Matchday, Women	Indonesia	2–1	Nepal	379
29 November 2025	FIFA Matchday, Women	Indonesia	0–5	Chinese Taipei	

=== Indonesia League Selection ===
Date	Time (UTC+7)	Team #1	Score	Team #2
11 January 2018 (Note: Non FIFA 'A' international match)	18:30	Indonesia	0 – 6	Iceland

=== 2022 AFF U-16 Youth Championship ===
The AFF U-16 Championship 2022 was originally scheduled to be held at Pakansari Stadium, but the venue was moved to Maguwo Stadium due to damage to the pitch.

Date	Round	Team	Score	Team	Crowd
31 July 2022	Group stage	Indonesia	2–0	Philippines	1,439
3 August 2022	Group stage	Singapore	0–9	Indonesia	1,759
6 August 2022	Group stage	Indonesia	2–1	Vietnam	
10 August 2022	Semi-finals	Indonesia (p)	1(5)–1(4)	Myanmar	
12 August 2022	Final	Vietnam	0–1	Indonesia	22,579

== Gallery ==
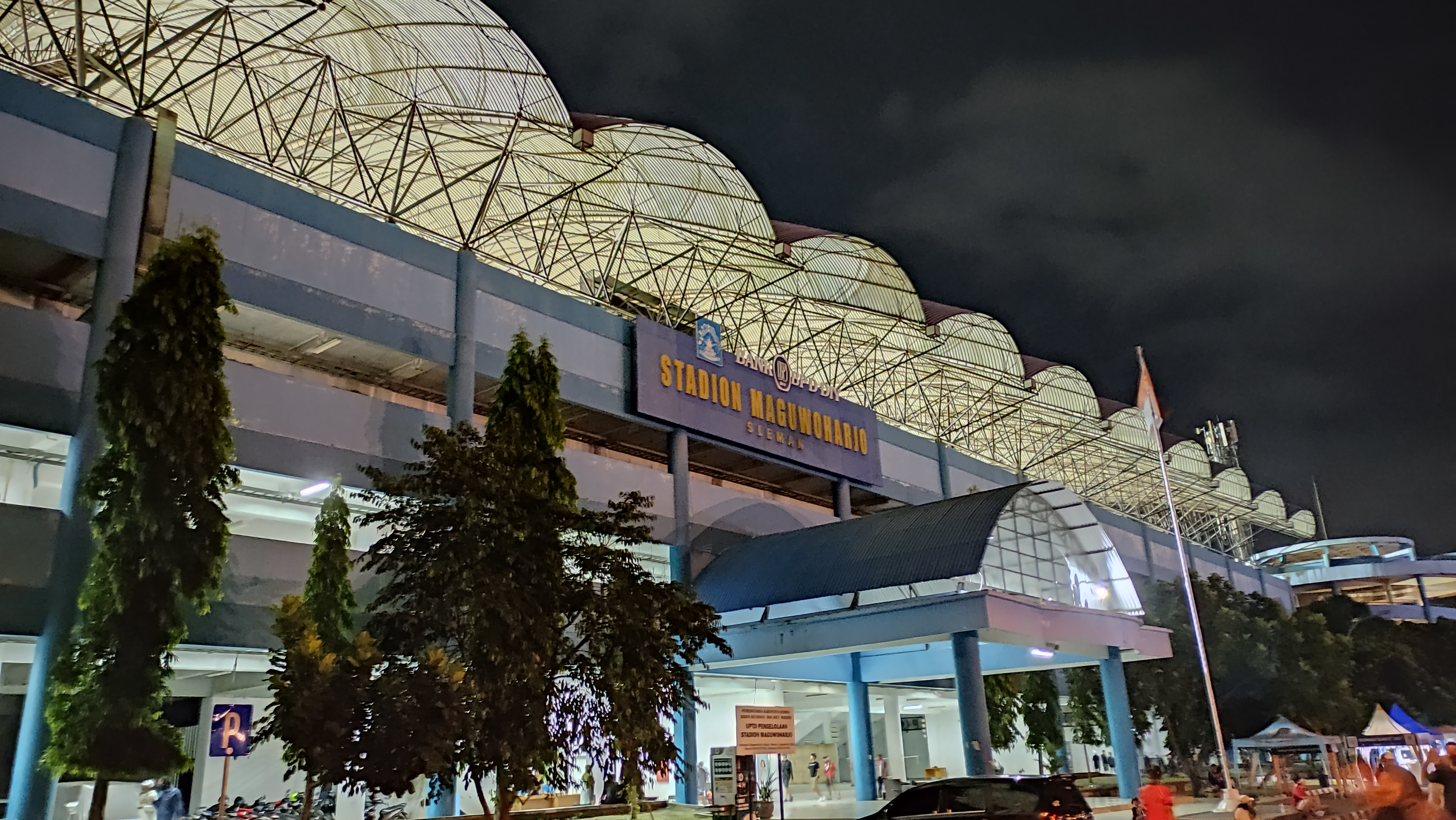
The main entrance of Maguwoharjo Stadium at night

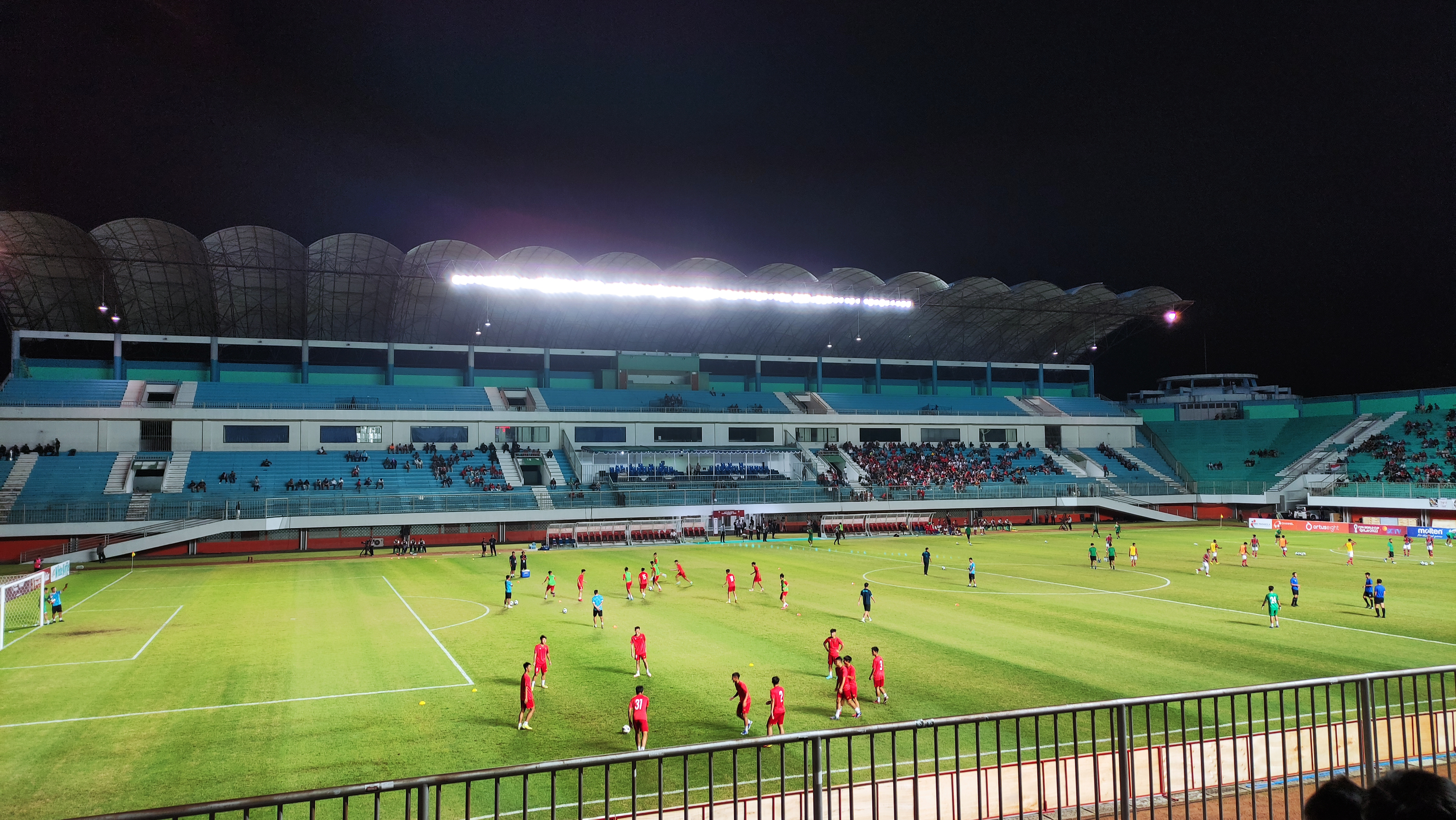
AFF U-16 Youth Championship match at Maguwoharjo Stadium between Indonesia vs Vietnam on August 6, 2022

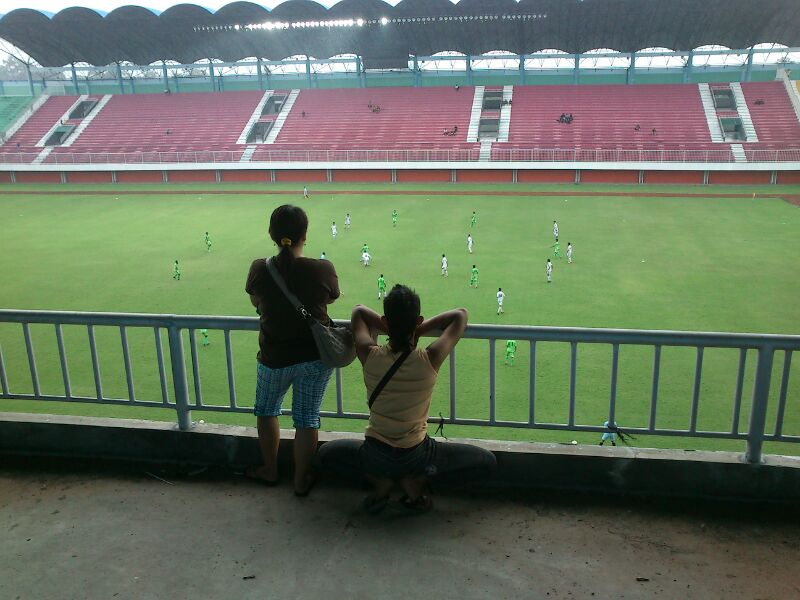
Inside the stadium

== See also ==
- PSS Sleman
- List of stadiums in Indonesia
