= Muhammad Ragil =

Indonesian footballer

Personal information
- Full name: Muhammad Ragil
- Date of birth: 8 May 2005 (age 21)
- Place of birth: Deli Serdang, Indonesia
- Height: 1.85 m (6 ft 1 in)
- Position: Forward

Team information
- Current team: PSMS Medan (on loan from Bhayangkara Presisi)
- Number: 30

Youth career
- Diklat Merden Banjarnegara
- 2021–2022: Bhayangkara
- 2022: Garuda Select

Senior career*
Years	Team	Apps	(Gls)
2022–	Bhayangkara Presisi	15	(2)
2025–2026	→ Kendal Tornado (loan)	25	(5)
2026–	→ PSMS Medan (loan)	1	(1)

International career^{‡}
2024–2025	Indonesia U20	18	(3)
2023–	Indonesia U23	4	(0)
Medal record
Men's football
Representing Indonesia
ASEAN U-19 Boys Championship
Winner	2024 Indonesia	Team
AFF U-23 Championship
Runner-up	2023 Thailand	Team
- * Club domestic league appearances and goals as of 20 September 2026 ‡ National team caps and goals as of 19 February 2025

Muhammad Ragil (born 8 May 2005) is an Indonesian professional footballer who plays as a forward for Championship club PSMS Medan, on loan from Bhayangkara Presisi.

== Club career ==
=== Bhayangkara ===
A product of Bhayangkara youth academy, Ragil made his Liga 1 debut with Bhayangkara in a 1–3 lost against PSIS Semarang on 3 July 2023, as a starter. He also scored his first goal in this match.

== International career ==
Ragil was called by coach Indra Sjafri to the Indonesia U20 team to participate at the 2024 Maurice Revello Tournament.

== Honours ==
Bhayangkara

- Liga 2 runner-up: 2024–25

Indonesia U-19

- ASEAN U-19 Boys Championship: 2024

Indonesia U23

- AFF U-23 Championship runner-up: 2023
