= Toni Firmansyah =

Indonesian footballer (born 2005)

Personal information
- Full name: Toni Firmansyah
- Date of birth: 14 January 2005 (age 21)
- Place of birth: Surabaya, Indonesia
- Height: 1.67 m (5 ft 6 in)
- Position: Midfielder

Team information
- Current team: Persebaya Surabaya
- Number: 68

Youth career
- 2018–2023: Persebaya Surabaya

Senior career*
| Years | Team | Apps | (Gls) |
| 2023– | Persebaya Surabaya | 66 | (1) |

International career^{‡}
| 2024–2025 | Indonesia U20 | 25 | (4) |
| 2025– | Indonesia U23 | 11 | (1) |
Medal record
Men's football
Representing Indonesia
ASEAN U-19 Boys Championship
| Winner | 2024 Indonesia | Team |
ASEAN U-23 Championship
| Runner-up | 2025 Indonesia | Team |
- * Club domestic league appearances and goals as of 23 May 2026 ‡ National team caps and goals as of 12 December 2025

Toni Firmansyah (born 14 January 2005) is an Indonesian professional footballer who plays as a midfielder for Super League club Persebaya Surabaya.

== Club career ==
=== Persebaya Surabaya ===
Firmansyah signed for Persebaya Surabaya in Liga 1 ahead of the 2023–24 season. He made his league debut on 1 July against Persis Solo at the Manahan Stadium, Surakarta.

== International career ==
In December 2023, Firmansyah got called up to the Indonesia under-20 team by head coach Indra Sjafri to a training camp in Jakarta.

On 26 January 2024, Firmansyah scored a goal in a friendly match against Thailand under-20.

Firmansyah was called by coach Indra Sjafri to the Indonesia U20 team to participate at the 2024 Maurice Revello Tournament.

== Career statistics ==
=== International goals ===
International under-20 goals

| No. | Date | Venue | Opponent | Score | Result | Competition |
|---|---|---|---|---|---|---|
| 1. | 26 January 2024 | Gelora Bung Karno Stadium, Jakarta, Indonesia | Thailand | 1–0 | 1–2 | Friendly |
| 2. | 14 June 2024 | Stade René Gimet, Saint-Chamas, France | South Korea | 1–2 | 1–2 | 2024 Maurice Revello Tournament |
| 3. | 25 September 2024 | Gelora Bung Karno Madya Stadium, Jakarta, Indonesia | Maldives | 3–0 | 4–0 | 2025 AFC U-20 Asian Cup qualification |
| 3. | 30 January 2025 | Delta Stadium, Sidoarjo, Indonesia | India | 1–0 | 4–0 | U20 Challenge Series |

== Honours ==
Persebaya Surabaya

- Piala Presiden: 2026

Indonesia U19

- ASEAN U-19 Boys Championship: 2024

Indonesia U23

- ASEAN U-23 Championship runner-up: 2025

Individual

- Liga 1/Super League Young Player of the Month: December 2024, August 2025
