= Alexandro Kamuru =

Indonesian footballer

Personal information
- Full name: Alexandro Felix Kamuru
- Date of birth: 19 August 2005 (age 21)
- Place of birth: Sorong, Indonesia
- Height: 1.70 m (5 ft 7 in)
- Position: Left-back

Youth career
- 2014–2018: SSB Gama Yogyakarta
- 2018–2025: Barito Putera

Senior career*
Years	Team	Apps	(Gls)
2026	Persipura Jayapura	1	(0)

International career^{‡}
2019–2020	Indonesia U16	11	(1)
2022–2024	Indonesia U20	7	(0)
Medal record
Men's football
Representing Indonesia
ASEAN U-16 Boys Championship
Third place	2019 Thailand
ASEAN U-19 Boys Championship
Winner	2024 Indonesia	Team
- * Club domestic league appearances and goals as of 15 February 2026 ‡ National team caps and goals as of 25 September 2024

Alexandro Felix Kamuru (born 19 August 2005) is an Indonesian professional footballer who plays as a left-back.

== Club career ==
He started playing football at the age of nine, joining local side SSB Gama Yogyakarta. In 2018 he left SSB Gama and joined professional side Barito Putera.

== International career ==
Kamuru has represented Indonesia at under-16 and under-20 level.

Kamuru was called by coach Indra Sjafri to the Indonesia U20 team to participate at the 2024 Maurice Revello Tournament.

== Early life ==
Born in Sorong, Southwest Papua, both of Kamuru's parents died when he was young; his father died before he was born in April 2005, and his mother in 2018. He was raised by his older brother.

== Honours ==
Indonesia U16

- ASEAN U-16 Boys Championship third place: 2019

Indonesia U-19

- ASEAN U-19 Boys Championship: 2024
