= Mufli Hidayat =

Indonesian footballer

Personal information
- Full name: Muhammad Mufli Hidayat
- Date of birth: 7 August 2005 (age 21)
- Place of birth: Bone, Indonesia
- Height: 1.72 m (5 ft 8 in)
- Positions: Right winger; right-back

Team information
- Current team: PSM Makassar
- Number: 71

Youth career
- 2017–2018: SSB Watampone
- 2019: Imran Soccer Academy
- 2020–2022: PSM Makassar
- 2021–2022: Garuda Select

Senior career*
Years	Team	Apps	(Gls)
2022–	PSM Makassar	57	(2)

International career
2024–2025	Indonesia U20	17	(0)
Medal record
Men's football
Representing Indonesia
ASEAN U-19 Boys Championship
Winner	2024 Indonesia	Team
- * Club domestic league appearances and goals as of 16 October 2026

Muhammad Mufli Hidayat (born 7 August 2005) is an Indonesian professional footballer who plays as a right winger for Super League club PSM Makassar.

== Club career ==
=== PSM Makassar ===
He was signed for PSM Makassar to played in Liga 1 on 2022 season. Mufli made his league debut on 8 December 2022 in a match against Persita Tangerang at the Sultan Agung Stadium, Bantul.

== International career ==
Mufli was called by coach Indra Sjafri to the Indonesia U20 team to participate at the 2024 Maurice Revello Tournament.

== Career statistics ==
=== Club ===
As of 6 September 2026.

Club	Season	League		Cup		Continental		Other		Total	
Club	Season	Apps	Goals	Apps	Goals	Apps	Goals	Apps	Goals	Apps	Goals
PSM Makassar	2022–23	10	0	0	0	0	0	0	0	10	0
PSM Makassar	2023–24	13	1	0	0	0	0	0	0	13	1
PSM Makassar	2024–25	12	0	0	0	–		4 (Note: Appearances in ASEAN Club Championship)	0	16	0
PSM Makassar	2025–26	18	1	0	0	–		0	0	18	1
PSM Makassar	2026–27	1	0	0	0	–		0	0	1	0
Career total		54	2	0	0	0	0	4	0	58	2

== Honours ==
PSM Makassar

- Liga 1: 2022–23

Indonesia U19

- ASEAN U-19 Boys Championship: 2024
