= Jens Raven =

Indonesian footballer (born 2005)

Personal information
- Full name: Jens Raven
- Date of birth: 12 October 2005 (age 21)
- Place of birth: Dordrecht, Netherlands
- Height: 1.87 m (6 ft 2 in)
- Position: Striker

Team information
- Current team: Bali United
- Number: 19

Youth career
- 2021–2022: SV Nootdorp
- 2023–2025: Dordrecht

Senior career*
Years	Team	Apps	(Gls)
2023	SV Nootdorp	7	(1)
2025–	Bali United	24	(1)

International career^{‡}
2024–2025	Indonesia U20	17	(8)
2025–	Indonesia U23	12	(9)
2026–	Indonesia	3	(1)
Medal record
Men's football
Representing Indonesia
FIFA Series
Runner-up	2026 Indonesia
ASEAN U-23 Championship
Runner-up	Indonesia 2025	Team
ASEAN U-19 Boys Championship
Winner	Indonesia 2024	Team
- * Club domestic league appearances and goals as of 22 May 2026 ‡ National team caps and goals as of 7 August 2026

Jens Raven (born 12 October 2005) is a professional footballer who plays as a striker for Super League club Bali United. Born in the Netherlands, he represents the Indonesia national team.

== Career ==
He started his career with local club SV Nootdorp until 2023, before joining Dordrecht's academy.

On 13 July 2025, he joined Bali United on three-year contract.

== International career ==
Raven was called by coach Indra Sjafri to the Indonesia U20 team to participate at the 2024 Maurice Revello Tournament.

Raven also got called up to the 2024 ASEAN U-19 Boys Championship in Surabaya. He scored 4 goals in the tournament, including the only goal in the final match against Thailand U19, helping the team become the champion.

Raven got called up to the Indonesia U23 team for the 2025 ASEAN U-23 Championship. On 15 July 2025, Raven scored a double hattrick in his debut match for the U23 team against Brunei U23 in a 8–0 victory.

Raven made his senior international debut for Indonesia on 27 July 2026 in a 2026 ASEAN Championship match against Cambodia, scoring a goal in a 5–1 victory.

== Personal life ==
Born in the Netherlands, Raven is of Indonesian descent.

On 27 June 2024, Raven officially obtained Indonesian citizenship.

== Career statistics ==
=== International ===
As of match played 7 August 2026

Appearances and goals by national team and year
National team	Year	Apps	Goals
Indonesia	2026	3	1
Total		3	1

List of international goals scored by Jens Raven
No.	Date	Venue	Opponent	Score	Result	Competition
1.	27 July 2026	Pakansari Stadium, Bogor, Indonesia	Cambodia	5–1	5–1	2026 ASEAN Championship

== Honours ==
Indonesia U-19

- ASEAN U-19 Boys Championship: 2024

Indonesia U-23

- ASEAN U-23 Championship runner-up: 2025

Individual

- ASEAN U-23 Championship Top Scorer: 2025

== See also ==
- List of Indonesia international footballers born outside Indonesia
