= Sulthan Zaky =

Indonesian footballer (born 2006)

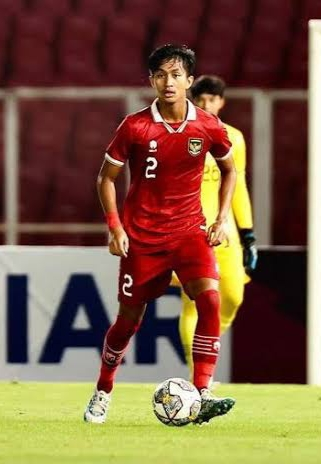
- Zaky playing for Indonesia U20 in 2023

Personal information
- Full name: Sulthan Zaky Pramana Putra Razak
- Date of birth: 23 March 2006 (age 20)
- Place of birth: Makassar, Indonesia
- Height: 1.86 m (6 ft 1 in)
- Position: Centre-back

Team information
- Current team: PSMS Medan
- Number: 23

Youth career
- –2023: PSM Makassar

Senior career*
Years	Team	Apps	(Gls)
2023–2026	PSM Makassar	3	(0)
2025–2026	→ MOI Kompong Dewa (loan)	14	(0)
2026–	PSMS Medan	2	(0)

International career
2022–2023	Indonesia U17	12	(1)
2023–2025	Indonesia U20	14	(0)
Medal record
Men's football
Representing Indonesia
ASEAN U-16 Boys Championship
Winner	2022 Indonesia
ASEAN U-19 Boys Championship
Winner	2024 Indonesia	Team
- * Club domestic league appearances and goals as of 3 October 2026

Sulthan Zaky Pramana Putra Razak (born 23 March 2006) is an Indonesian professional footballer who plays as a centre-back for Championship club PSMS Medan.

== Club career ==
Born in Makassar, Zaky is a youth product of PSM Makassar, the biggest club in his city. He was promoted to the first team in 2023.

== International career ==
In 2022, Zaky featured in the 2022 AFF U-16 Youth Championship with Indonesia U16. He was a starter throughout the tournament as Indonesia were crowned as champions.

In February 2023, Zaky featured in the 2023 AFC U-20 Asian Cup with Indonesia U20 as the youngest member of his team.

In November 2023, Zaky was called up to the Indonesia U17 squad for the 2023 FIFA U-17 World Cup, hosted in his home country Indonesia. He started in all three group stage matches and helped Indonesia drew two games but the team failed to advance to the next stage.

In June 2024, he took part in the Maurice Revello Tournament in France with Indonesia.

On 25 November 2024, Zaky received a called up to the preliminary squad to the Indonesia senior team for the 2024 ASEAN Championship.

== Personal life ==
Zaky is the nephew of former footballer Ansar Razak and the cousin of Asnawi Mangkualam, the Indonesia national team player.

== Honours ==
Indonesia U16

- ASEAN U-16 Boys Championship: 2022

Indonesia U19

- ASEAN U-19 Boys Championship: 2024
