= Alfharezzi Buffon =

Indonesian footballer

Personal information
- Full name: Muhammad Alfharezzi Buffon
- Date of birth: 28 April 2006 (age 20)
- Place of birth: Jakarta, Indonesia
- Height: 1.72 m (5 ft 8 in)
- Positions: Right-back; centre-back

Team information
- Current team: Dewa United Banten (on loan from Garudayaksa)
- Number: 25

Youth career
- 2019: Bina Sentra
- 2021–2022: Borneo Samarinda

Senior career*
Years	Team	Apps	(Gls)
2023–2026	Borneo Samarinda	37	(1)
2026–	Garudayaksa	0	(0)
2026–	→ Dewa United Banten (loan)	8	(0)

International career
2024–2025	Indonesia U20	15	(1)
2025–	Indonesia U23	6	(0)
Medal record
Men's football
Representing Indonesia
ASEAN U-19 Boys Championship
Winner	2024 Indonesia	Team
ASEAN U-23 Championship
Runner-up	2025 Indonesia	Team
- * Club domestic league appearances and goals as of 31 October 2026

Muhammad Alfharezzi Buffon (born 28 April 2006) is an Indonesian professional footballer who plays as a defender for Super League club Dewa United Banten, on loan from Garudayaksa.

== Club career ==
Buffon recorded himself as the third youngest player to make his debut in Liga 1 2022/23 (Precisely in the 32nd week). Even in the match against Bali United at Segiri Stadium, Samarinda, Buffon was fielded when he was still 16 years 11 months and four days old. This is also inseparable because Buffon got his professional contract at a young age by Borneo FC Samarinda in January 2023.

== International career ==
After Buffon's name skyrocketed due to his impressive performance by scoring a goal against Madura United in the first leg of the 2023/24 League 1 Championship Series semifinals, he received a call-up to the Indonesian U-19 National Team squad coached by Indra Sjafri for ASEAN U-19 Boys Championship. There, he played as a right-back instead of a centre-back which is his original position.

== Honours ==
=== International ===
Indonesia U-19

- ASEAN U-19 Boys Championship: 2024

Indonesia U-23

- ASEAN U-23 Championship runner-up: 2025
