= Meshaal Hamzah =

Indonesian footballer (born 2005)

Meshaal Osman
Personal information
- Full name: Meshaal Hamzah Bashier Osman
- Date of birth: 25 January 2005 (age 21)
- Place of birth: Jakarta, Indonesia
- Height: 1.83 m (6 ft 0 in)
- Position: Centre-back

Team information
- Current team: Deltras
- Number: 5

Youth career
- 2020–2023: ASIOP Apacinti

Senior career*
Years	Team	Apps	(Gls)
2023–2025	Persija Jakarta	0	(0)
2024	→ PSBS Biak (loan)	2	(0)
2025	→ Nakhon Pathom United (loan)	1	(0)
2025–	Deltras	14	(0)

International career^{‡}
2024–2025	Indonesia U20	14	(0)
Medal record
Men's football
Representing Indonesia
ASEAN U-19 Boys Championship
Winner	2024 Indonesia	Team
- * Club domestic league appearances and goals as of 3 May 2026 ‡ National team caps and goals as of 27 January 2025

Meshaal Hamzah Bashier Osman (born 25 January 2005) is an Indonesian professional footballer who plays as a centre-back for Deltras.

== Early life ==
Osman was born on 25 January 2005 in Jakarta, Indonesia to Sudanese parents. Growing up, he regarded Brazil international Casemiro as his football idol.

== Club career ==
Hamzah started his career with ASIOP. In 2023, he signed for Persija Jakarta. Six months later, he was sent on loan to PSBS Biak, where he made two league appearances. Subsequently, he was sent on loan to Thai side Nakhon Pathom United in 2025.

== International career ==
In June 2024, he took part in the Maurice Revello Tournament in France with Indonesia.

== Honours ==
=== International ===
Indonesia U-19

- ASEAN U-19 Boys Championship: 2024
