= 2024 ASEAN U-19 Boys Championship squads =

The 2024 ASEAN U-19 Boys Championship is an international football tournament that will be held in Indonesia from 17 July to 29 July 2024. The 12 national teams involved in the tournament were required to register a squad of 23 players in which three must be goalkeepers; only players in these squads are eligible to take part in the tournament.

== Group A ==
=== Cambodia ===
Head coach: Phea Sopheaktra

No.	Pos.	Player	Date of birth (age)	Caps	Goals	Club
1	GK	Mat Lany (captain)	12 September 2005 (age 21)			(Football Federation of Cambodia) Tiffy Army
2	DF	Sonn Thavisiv	2 July 2006 (age 20)			(Football Federation of Cambodia) Bati Academy
3	MF	Bong Samuel	25 September 2005 (age 21)			(Football Federation of Cambodia) Phnom Penh Crown
4	DF	Em Chhumsideth	14 May 2005 (age 21)			(Football Federation of Cambodia) Kirivong Sok Sen Chey
5	DF	Var David	4 April 2007 (age 19)			(Football Federation of Cambodia) Bati Academy
6	DF	Tam Makara	25 January 2006 (age 20)			(Football Federation of Cambodia) Bati Academy
7	FW	Sou Menghong	27 March 2007 (age 19)			(Football Federation of Cambodia) Bati Academy
8	MF	It Sony	7 July 2006 (age 20)			(Football Federation of Cambodia) Nagaworld
9	MF	Eav Sovannara	1 January 2005 (age 21)			(Football Federation of Cambodia) Boeung Ket
10	MF	Lucca Lim	14 September 2006 (age 20)			(New Zealand Football) Melville United
11	MF	Sorm Borith	9 April 2005 (age 21)			(Football Federation of Cambodia) Phnom Penh Crown
12	FW	Sa Usos	25 October 2006 (age 19)			(Football Federation of Cambodia) Tiffy Army
13	DF	Chheang Kimsong	24 June 2005 (age 21)			(Football Federation of Cambodia) Visakha
14	DF	Chhin Vennin	25 June 2005 (age 21)			(Football Federation of Cambodia) Phnom Penh Crown
15	FW	Sreng Sokea	1 March 2007 (age 19)			(Football Federation of Cambodia) Tiffy Army
16	MF	Soeng Somborithy				(Football Federation of Cambodia) Visakha
17	MF	Lim Visal	17 June 2005 (age 21)			(Football Federation of Cambodia) Phnom Penh Crown
18	MF	Leang Pisey	2 December 2005 (age 20)			(Football Federation of Cambodia) Tiffy Army
19	MF	Uk Devin	27 September 2006 (age 20)			(Football Federation of Cambodia) Bati Academy
20	DF	Voeurn Sokkosal	4 November 2005 (age 20)			(Football Federation of Cambodia) ISI Dangkor Senchey
21	GK	Phai Chhaiya	6 October 2005 (age 21)			(Football Federation of Cambodia) Visakha
22	GK	Ron Chongmieng	4 May 2006 (age 20)			(Football Federation of Cambodia) Bati Academy
23	FW	Pheouk Thathai	27 January 2005 (age 21)			(Football Federation of Cambodia) Visakha

=== Indonesia ===
Head coach: Indra Sjafri

No.	Pos.	Player	Date of birth (age)	Caps	Goals	Club
1	GK	Ikram Algiffari	6 June 2006 (age 20)	8	0	(Football Association of Indonesia) Semen Padang
2	DF	Rizdjar Nurviat	2 January 2006 (age 20)	1	0	(Football Association of Indonesia) Borneo Samarinda
3	DF	Alexandro Kamuru	19 August 2005 (age 21)	4	0	(Football Association of Indonesia) Barito Putera
4	DF	Kadek Arel	4 April 2005 (age 21)	11	1	(Football Association of Indonesia) Bali United
5	DF	Alfharezzi Buffon	28 April 2006 (age 20)	1	0	(Football Association of Indonesia) Borneo Samarinda
6	DF	Meshaal Hamzah	25 January 2005 (age 21)	6	0	(Football Association of Indonesia) Persija Jakarta
7	MF	Figo Dennis	28 April 2006 (age 20)	8	1	(Football Association of Indonesia) Persija Jakarta
8	FW	Arkhan Kaka	2 September 2007 (age 19)	10	0	(Football Association of Indonesia) Persis Solo
9	FW	Jens Raven	12 October 2005 (age 20)	6	1	(Royal Dutch Football Association) Dordrecht
10	MF	Kafiatur Rizky	17 July 2006 (age 20)	3	1	(Football Association of Indonesia) Borneo Samarinda
11	MF	Riski Afrisal	25 April 2006 (age 20)	6	0	(Football Association of Indonesia) Madura United
12	DF	Welber Jardim	25 April 2007 (age 19)	7	0	(Brazilian Football Confederation) São Paulo
13	FW	Mufdi Iskandar	1 February 2006 (age 20)	3	0	(Football Association of Indonesia) Persiku Kudus
14	DF	Sulthan Zaky	23 March 2006 (age 20)	9	0	(Football Association of Indonesia) PSM Makassar
15	MF	Marselinus Ama Ola	21 March 2005 (age 21)	0	0	(Royal Spanish Football Federation) Logroñés
16	DF	Dony Tri Pamungkas (captain)	11 January 2005 (age 21)	19	1	(Football Association of Indonesia) Persija Jakarta
17	FW	Mufli Hidayat	7 August 2005 (age 21)	9	0	(Football Association of Indonesia) PSM Makassar
18	MF	Toni Firmansyah	14 January 2005 (age 21)	8	2	(Football Association of Indonesia) Persebaya Surabaya
19	FW	Muhammad Ragil	8 May 2005 (age 21)	4	0	(Football Association of Indonesia) Bhayangkara
20	MF	Arlyansyah Abdulmanan	20 December 2005 (age 20)	7	1	(Football Association of Indonesia) Persija Jakarta
21	DF	Iqbal Gwijangge	29 August 2006 (age 20)	4	2	(Football Association of Indonesia) Barito Putera
22	GK	Wayan Arta	1 October 2006 (age 20)	0	0	(Football Association of Indonesia) Bali United
23	GK	Fitrah Maulana	24 May 2006 (age 20)	1	0	(Football Association of Indonesia) Persib Bandung

=== Philippines ===
Head coach: (Spain) Josep Ferré

No.	Pos.	Player	Date of birth (age)	Caps	Goals	Club
1	GK	Iñigo Castro III	2 July 2006 (aged 18)	2	0	(United States Soccer Federation) Combine Rush
2	GK	Alfonso Gonzalez	5 January 2005 (aged 19)	1	0	(Philippine Football Federation) University of the Philippines
3	DF	Caleb Santos	4 October 2005 (aged 18)	0	0	(United States Soccer Federation) Black Rock
4	DF	Manolo Veneracion	14 March 2005 (aged 19)	0	0	(Football Australia) Perth Glory
5	DF	Joshua Meriño (captain)	11 February 2005 (aged 19)	3	1	(Royal Spanish Football Federation) Alicante City
6	DF	Bryan Villanueva	30 July 2006 (aged 17)	0	0	(Philippine Football Federation) Tuloy
7	FW	Otu Banatao	11 November 2006 (aged 17)	0	0	(United States Soccer Federation) D.C. United
8	MF	Sebastian Lizares	7 August 2005 (aged 18)	0	0	(United States Soccer Federation) Western Reserve Academy
9	MF	Ichiro Koyama	5 December 2006 (aged 17)	0	0	(German Football Association) FC 08 Homburg
10	FW	Benz Samaniego	1 September 2007 (aged 16)	0	0	(Canadian Soccer Association) The Scarborough Academy
11	MF	Jhon Diaz	24 October 2006 (aged 17)	0	0	(Philippine Football Federation) Tuloy
12	MF	Yuan Maniscan		0	0	(Philippine Football Federation) University of Santo Tomas
13	FW	Trez Mariñas	31 January 2005 (aged 19)	0	0	(Philippine Football Federation) University of Santo Tomas
14	FW	Justin Moya	21 August 2006 (aged 17)	0	0	(Football Australia) Wynnum Wolves
15	DF	Bhyl Gimenez	16 August 2005 (aged 18)	0	0	(Philippine Football Federation) University of Southern Philippines
16	FW	Ryen Lim		0	0	(Philippine Football Federation) Ateneo de Manila University
17	DF	Justin Oġur	2 January 2006 (aged 18)	0	0	(Turkish Football Federation) Gaziantep
18	MF	Miguel Benson	9 February 2006 (aged 18)	0	0	(Philippine Football Federation) Ateneo de Manila University
19	MF	Cyrelle Saut	3 September 2005 (aged 18)	6	0	(Philippine Football Federation) Tuloy
20	DF	Alexander Sabatin	27 January 2006 (aged 18)	0	0	(Canadian Soccer Association) Sigma
21	MF	Sylver Pormento	18 March 2005 (aged 19)	0	0	(Philippine Football Federation) Mendiola 1991
22	GK	Luc Narido	9 August 2007 (aged 16)	0	0	(United States Soccer Federation) Breakers
23	DF	Jian Caraig	6 August 2005 (aged 18)	0	0	(Royal Spanish Football Federation) Odisea

=== Timor-Leste ===
Head coach: Eduardo Pereira

No.	Pos.	Player	Date of birth (age)	Club
1	GK	Domingos Baptista		(East Timor Football Federation)
2	DF	Rui Juman		(East Timor Football Federation)
3	DF	Carol Waitilia		(East Timor Football Federation)
4	DF	Aureo Viera		(East Timor Football Federation)
5	MF	Palomito Antonio		(East Timor Football Federation) Nagarjo
6	DF	Fabrizio dos Santos		(East Timor Football Federation)
7	FW	Luís Figo Pereira	17 April 2005 (aged 19)	(East Timor Football Federation) Ponta Leste
8	MF	Luis da Silva	20 May 2006 (aged 18)	(East Timor Football Federation) SLB Laulara
9	FW	Alexandre Vong Guterres		(East Timor Football Federation) Santa Cruz
10	FW	Alexandro Bakhito	1 May 2006 (aged 18)	(East Timor Football Federation) SLB Laulara
11	MF	Vabio Canavaro	25 January 2007 (aged 17)	(East Timor Football Federation) Ponta Leste
12	GK	Alexandre Quintão		(East Timor Football Federation) Marca
13	DF	Norbert Jonerson		(East Timor Football Federation)
14	MF	Edencio Soares	5 October 2005 (aged 18)	(East Timor Football Federation) Porto Taibesse
15	DF	Ricardo Bianco (captain)	15 January 2006 (aged 18)	(East Timor Football Federation) Ponta Leste
16	MF	Leonio Quilton		(East Timor Football Federation)
17	FW	Ario Melio		(East Timor Football Federation)
18	DF	Emidio Martins		(East Timor Football Federation)
19	DF	Francisco Assisi		(East Timor Football Federation)
20	GK	Egidio Luro		(East Timor Football Federation)
21	MF	Uaitila Aprilio		(East Timor Football Federation)
22	MF	Marques de Carvalho	25 February 2007 (aged 17)	(East Timor Football Federation) SLB Laulara
23	DF	Claudia Faria		(East Timor Football Federation)

== Group B ==
=== Australia ===
Head coach: Trevor Morgan

No.	Pos.	Player	Date of birth (age)	Caps	Goals	Club
1	GK	Max Vartuli	20 January 2005 (age 21)	0	0	(Football Australia) Sydney FC
2	DF	Ben van Dorssen	11 May 2005 (age 21)	0	0	(Football Australia) Newcastle Jets
3	DF	Lucas Herrington	5 September 2007 (age 19)	0	0	(Football Australia) Brisbane Roar
4	DF	Pearson Kasawaya	14 October 2006 (age 19)	0	0	(Football Australia) Sydney FC
5	DF	Zac De Jesus	4 February 2006 (age 20)	0	0	(Football Australia) Sydney FC
6	MF	Ryley Hollingdale		0	0	(Football Australia) Western Sydney Wanderers
7	MF	Marcus Younis (captain)	3 July 2005 (age 21)	3	1	(Football Australia) Western Sydney Wanderers
8	DF	Fabian Talladira	4 February 2006 (age 20)	1	0	(Football Australia) Adelaide United
9	FW	Arion Sulemani	1 March 2005 (age 21)	0	0	(Football Australia) Melbourne City
10	FW	Tiago Quintal	16 June 2006 (age 20)	0	0	(Football Australia) Sydney FC
11	MF	Kavian Rahmani		0	0	(Football Australia) Melbourne City
12	GK	Dylan Peraić-Cullen	25 July 2006 (age 20)	0	0	(Football Australia) Central Coast Mariners
13	DF	Luke Vickery	25 October 2005 (age 20)	0	0	(Football Australia) Western United
14	DF	Tyler Williams	22 December 2007 (age 18)	0	0	(Football Australia) Sydney FC
15	MF	Oliver Randazzo	12 October 2006 (age 19)	0	0	(Football Australia) Macarthur FC
16	MF	Zane Helweh		0	0	(Football Australia) Macarthur FC
17	FW	Jake Najdovski	14 March 2005 (age 21)	0	0	(Football Australia) Western United
18	GK	Daniel Graskoski	28 January 2007 (age 19)	0	0	(Football Australia) Melbourne Victory
19	FW	Medin Memeti	20 July 2007 (age 19)	0	0	(Football Australia) Melbourne City
20	MF	Xavier Stella	21 August 2006 (age 20)	0	0	(Football Australia) Melbourne City
21	MF	Adam Bugarija	22 February 2005 (age 21)	0	0	(Football Australia) Perth Glory
22	DF	Dylan Leonard	14 May 2007 (age 19)	0	0	(Football Australia) Western United
23	MF	Jesse Hoey	6 January 2006 (age 20)	0	0	(Football Australia) Melbourne Victory

=== Laos ===
Head coach: Kanlaya Sysomvang

No.	Pos.	Player	Date of birth (age)	Club
1	GK	Kop Lokphathip	8 May 2006 (age 20)	(Lao Football Federation) Ezra
2	DF	Xayasouk Keovisone	21 July 2006 (age 20)	(Lao Football Federation) Ezra
3	DF	Chanthavisouk Phongsavath	16 December 2007 (age 18)	(Lao Football Federation) Ezra
4	MF	Khammanh Thapaseut	31 December 2007 (age 18)	(Lao Football Federation) Ezra
5	DF	Sisavath Keomoungkhoun	5 October 2006 (age 20)	(Lao Football Federation) Namtha United
6	MF	Chanthaviphone Phoumsavanh	19 June 2005 (age 21)	(Lao Football Federation) Namtha United
7	MF	Sayfon Keohanam (captain)	11 July 2006 (age 20)	(Football Association of Thailand) Maraleina
8	FW	Pheatsamone Sihathep	30 March 2006 (age 20)	(Lao Football Federation) Young Elephants
9	FW	Thanousack Nanthavongdouangsy	21 August 2006 (age 20)	(Lao Football Federation) Ezra
10	FW	Peter Phanthavong	15 February 2006 (age 20)	(Lao Football Federation) Ezra
11	FW	Somvang Chummani	2 April 2006 (age 20)	(Lao Football Federation) Master 7
12	GK	Soulisak Manpaseuth	1 November 2008 (age 17)	(Lao Football Federation) Champasak United
13	DF	Khounvang Soundala	13 November 2006 (age 19)	(Lao Football Federation) Namtha United
14	DF	Phetvixay Phimmasen	8 January 2005 (age 21)	(Lao Football Federation) Ezra
15	DF	Matheo Ackhavong	14 July 2007 (age 19)	(French Football Federation) Cholet
16	DF	Ki Mounkanyah	18 November 2009 (age 16)	(Lao Football Federation) Master 7
17	MF	Xayxana Sihalath	11 August 2006 (age 20)	(Lao Football Federation) Ezra
18	GK	Souksamone Vethita	13 August 2007 (age 19)	(Lao Football Federation) Young Elephants
19	MF	Phousomboun Panyavong	20 June 2007 (age 19)	(Lao Football Federation) Lao Army
20	FW	Songkran Liyasak	13 April 2006 (age 20)	(Lao Football Federation) Namtha United
21	MF	Inthida Xayyasane	10 August 2006 (age 20)	(Lao Football Federation) Master 7
22	FW	Yotxay Xayamphone	4 July 2005 (age 21)	(Lao Football Federation) Ezra
23	MF	Bounpharng Xaysombath	5 February 2005 (age 21)	(Lao Football Federation) Luang Prabang

=== Myanmar ===
Head coach: Aung Naing

No.	Pos.	Player	Date of birth (age)	Caps	Goals	Club
1	GK	Saw Kyaw Khant No	21 February 2005 (age 21)	0	0	(Myanmar Football Federation) Ayeyawady United
2	DF	Latt Wai Phone	4 May 2005 (age 21)	4	0	(Myanmar Football Federation) Hantharwaddy
3	DF	Khant Zin Hein	18 April 2005 (age 21)	6	0	(Myanmar Football Federation) Mahar United
4	MF	Saw Lin Htet Paing		0	0	(Myanmar Football Federation) Rakhapura United
5	DF	Samuel Ngai Kee		0	0	(Myanmar Football Federation) Yadanarbon
6	FW	Naing Win Tun	15 November 2005 (age 20)	0	0	(Myanmar Football Federation) Thitsar Arman
7	FW	Swan Htet (captain)	12 April 2005 (age 21)	7	2	(Myanmar Football Federation) Dagon Star
8	MF	Min Maw Oo	6 March 2005 (age 21)	0	0	(Myanmar Football Federation) Thitsar Arman
9	FW	Saw Sae Ka'paw Say	26 May 2005 (age 21)	0	0	(Myanmar Football Federation) ISPE
10	FW	Win Pyae Maung	23 February 2006 (age 20)	0	0	(Myanmar Football Federation) ISPE
11	MF	Kaung Khant Kyaw	26 February 2007 (age 19)	0	0	(Myanmar Football Federation) Yangon United
12	FW	Shine Wanna Aung	15 March 2006 (age 20)	0	0	(Myanmar Football Federation) Thitsar Arman
13	GK	Han Myint Myat Tun	19 November 2005 (age 20)	0	0	(Myanmar Football Federation) Mahar United
14	MF	Win Ko Htay	2 August 2005 (age 21)	0	0	(Myanmar Football Federation) Mahar United
15	MF	Zaw Myo Tun		0	0	(Myanmar Football Federation) Dagon Star United
16	MF	Naing Aung San		0	0	(Myanmar Football Federation) Dagon Port
17	DF	Tun Tun Thein	3 December 2005 (age 20)	9	0	(Myanmar Football Federation) Dagon Port
18	GK	Saw Ei Do Htoo		0	0	(Myanmar Football Federation) Dagon Port
19	DF	Khon Cho Htoo		0	0	(Myanmar Football Federation) Yangon United
20	FW	Zwe Man Thar	1 June 2005 (age 21)	0	0	(Myanmar Football Federation) Hantharwaddy
21	DF	Ye Kaung Sat	20 January 2005 (age 21)	1	0	(Myanmar Football Federation) Shwe Pyi Thar
22	DF	Phyo Pyae Sone	28 June 2005 (age 21)	0	0	(Myanmar Football Federation) Yangon United
23	DF	Hlwan Htet Tun		0	0	(Myanmar Football Federation) Yangon United

=== Vietnam ===
Head coach: Hứa Hiền Vinh

No.	Pos.	Player	Date of birth (age)	Caps	Goals	Club
1	GK	Cao Văn Bình	8 January 2005 (age 21)	15	0	(Vietnam Football Federation) Sông Lam Nghệ An
2	DF	Nguyễn Mai Hoàng	21 February 2005 (age 21)	0	0	(Vietnam Football Federation) Kon Tum
3	DF	Lê Khả Đức	18 September 2007 (age 19)	3	0	(Vietnam Football Federation) Bà Rịa–Vũng Tàu
4	DF	Nguyễn Lương Tuấn Khải	14 November 2006 (age 19)	0	0	(Vietnam Football Federation) Huế
5	DF	Nguyễn Quốc Khánh	15 May 2007 (age 19)	3	0	(Vietnam Football Federation) PVF
6	MF	Nguyễn Ngọc Chiến	19 October 2005 (age 20)	2	0	(Vietnam Football Federation) Becamex Bình Dương
7	FW	Lê Đình Long Vũ	27 May 2006 (age 20)	3	1	(Vietnam Football Federation) Sông Lam Nghệ An
8	MF	Nguyễn Công Phương	3 June 2006 (age 20)	3	0	(Vietnam Football Federation) Thể Công-Viettel
9	FW	Nguyến Đăng Khoa	20 August 2007 (age 19)	2	0	(Vietnam Football Federation) Huế
10	MF	Dương Đình Nguyên	26 July 2006 (age 20)	0	0	(Vietnam Football Federation) Hà Nội
11	FW	Nguyễn Hữu Tuấn	12 March 2005 (age 21)	0	0	(Vietnam Football Federation) Huế
12	DF	Nguyễn Bảo Long	23 August 2005 (age 21)	15	0	(Vietnam Football Federation) PVF-CAND
13	GK	Nguyễn Bảo Ngọc	28 March 2007 (age 19)	1	0	(Vietnam Football Federation) Kon Tum
14	MF	Hoàng Quang Dũng	18 February 2005 (age 21)	3	0	(Vietnam Football Federation) Huế
15	FW	Lê Huỳnh Triệu	16 June 2006 (age 20)	3	0	(Vietnam Football Federation) Văn Hiến University
16	MF	Nguyễn Quang Vinh	27 January 2005 (age 21)	0	0	(Vietnam Football Federation) Sông Lam Nghệ An
17	MF	Thái Bá Đạt (captain)	23 March 2005 (age 21)	2	0	(Vietnam Football Federation) PVF-CAND
18	FW	Đinh Quang Kiệt	16 July 2007 (age 19)	2	0	(Vietnam Football Federation) Kon Tum
19	DF	Trương Nhạc Minh	24 January 2006 (age 20)	3	0	(Vietnam Football Federation) Bà Rịa–Vũng Tàu
20	FW	Phùng Văn Nam	22 January 2006 (age 20)	0	0	(Vietnam Football Federation) Kon Tum
21	GK	Phạm Đình Hải	29 March 2006 (age 20)	2	0	(Vietnam Football Federation) Hà Nội
22	DF	Lê Thắng Long	17 February 2006 (age 20)	3	0	(Vietnam Football Federation) PVF
23	FW	Nguyễn Hoàng Anh	12 January 2006 (age 20)	1	0	(Vietnam Football Federation) PVF

== Group C ==
=== Brunei ===
Head coach: Aminuddin Jumat

No.	Pos.	Player	Date of birth (age)	Caps	Goals	Club
1	GK	Shahrul Haikal		0	0	(Football Association of Brunei Darussalam) Rimba Star
2	DF	Akmal Rizal		0	0	(Football Association of Brunei Darussalam) DPMM
3	DF	Abdul Hakimee		0	0	(Football Association of Brunei Darussalam) Kasuka
4	DF	Adrian Zikry		0	0	(Football Association of Brunei Darussalam) DPMM
5	MF	Wafiq Danish	13 January 2005 (age 21)	7	0	(Football Association of Brunei Darussalam) Kasuka
6	MF	Hafiy Herman	6 February 2005 (age 21)	1	0	(Football Association of Brunei Darussalam) Kasuka
7	MF	Danish Bazli		0	0	(Football Association of Brunei Darussalam) Kuala Belait
8	FW	Safwan Zawawi	8 June 2006 (age 20)	0	0	(Football Association of Brunei Darussalam) DPMM
9	FW	Adrian Zizry		0	0	(Football Association of Brunei Darussalam) DPMM
10	FW	Al-Kholil Sapawi		0	0	(Football Association of Brunei Darussalam) Setia Perdana
11	MF	Hadi Aiman Hamizal		0	0	(Football Association of Brunei Darussalam) DPMM
12	FW	Haziq Syazwan		0	0	(Football Association of Brunei Darussalam) Kasuka
13	DF	Syahmi Darwisy		0	0	(Football Association of Brunei Darussalam) Unknown
14	MF	Danial Hakimi		0	0	(Football Association of Brunei Darussalam) DPMM
15	DF	Abdul Raziq		0	0	(Football Association of Brunei Darussalam) DPMM
16	DF	Irfan Abdullah		0	0	(Football Association of Brunei Darussalam) DPMM
17	MF	Abdul Muntaqim (captain)	17 March 2007 (age 19)	0	0	(Football Association of Brunei Darussalam) DPMM
18	GK	Nur Muhammad Adi Hallim	30 January 2006 (age 20)	0	0	(Football Association of Brunei Darussalam) Wasan
19	DF	Azrin Danial	11 February 2006 (age 20)	0	0	(Football Association of Brunei Darussalam) DPMM
20	GK	Wa'ie Haziq		0	0	(Football Association of Brunei Darussalam) DPMM
21	MF	Baihaqi Yusop	4 February 2005 (age 21)	1	0	(Football Association of Brunei Darussalam) Jerudong
22	MF	Farrish Ballkid		0	0	(Football Association of Brunei Darussalam) DPMM
23	DF	Danish Firdaus	23 January 2006 (age 20)	0	0	(Football Association of Brunei Darussalam) DPMM

=== Malaysia ===
Head coach: (Spain) Juan Torres Garrido

No.	Pos.	Player	Date of birth (age)	Club
1	GK	Amir Jef	6 March 2005 (age 21)	(Football Association of Malaysia) Sabah
2	DF	Ridzwan Rosli	17 March 2005 (age 21)	(Football Association of Malaysia) Johor Darul Ta'zim
3	MF	Faris Danish	4 July 2006 (age 20)	(Football Association of Malaysia) Johor Darul Ta'zim
4	DF	Moses Raj	10 August 2005 (age 21)	(Football Association of Malaysia) Perak
5	DF	Shafizan Arshad	5 August 2005 (age 21)	(Football Association of Malaysia) Johor Darul Ta'zim
6	MF	Danish Hakimi	11 April 2005 (age 21)	(Football Association of Malaysia) Johor Darul Ta'zim
7	FW	Zamirul Hakim	18 November 2005 (age 20)	(Football Association of Malaysia) Selangor
8	MF	Muhammad Khalil	11 April 2005 (age 21)	(Japan Football Association) FC Osaka
9	FW	Izzat Syahir	29 July 2005 (age 21)	(Football Association of Malaysia) Selangor
10	MF	Haykal Danish	5 May 2005 (age 21)	(Football Association of Malaysia) Selangor
11	FW	G. Pavithran	10 January 2005 (age 21)	(Football Association of Malaysia) Johor Darul Ta'zim
12	DF	Amir Farhan	12 March 2005 (age 21)	(Football Association of Malaysia) Selangor
13	MF	Danial Mohd Nor	19 January 2005 (age 21)	(Football Association of Malaysia) Terengganu
14	FW	Naim Zainudin	28 March 2006 (age 20)	(Football Association of Malaysia) Johor Darul Ta'zim
15	DF	Aiman Hakimi	28 January 2005 (age 21)	(Football Association of Malaysia) Selangor
16	GK	Faez Iqhwan	3 February 2005 (age 21)	(Football Association of Malaysia) Mokhtar Dahari Academy
17	FW	Arami Wafiy	30 March 2006 (age 20)	(Football Association of Malaysia) Johor Darul Ta'zim
18	MF	Adam Haikal	10 October 2005 (age 20)	(Football Association of Malaysia) Selangor
19	DF	Zachary Zahidadil	27 May 2005 (age 21)	(Football Association of Malaysia) Terengganu
20	FW	Abid Safaraz	6 March 2007 (age 19)	(Football Association of Malaysia) Johor Darul Ta'zim
21	DF	Ariff Safwan (captain)	17 February 2005 (age 21)	(Football Association of Malaysia) Johor Darul Ta'zim
22	MF	Alauddeen Aliff	22 February 2007 (age 19)	(Football Association of Malaysia) Johor Darul Ta'zim
23	GK	Haziq Aiman	19 January 2005 (age 21)	(Football Association of Malaysia) Johor Darul Ta'zim

=== Singapore ===
Head coach: Gareth Low

No.	Pos.	Player	Date of birth (age)	Caps	Goals	Club
1	GK	Azakhir Azali		0	0	(Football Association of Singapore) Geylang International
2	DF	Raoul Suhaimi (captain)	18 September 2005 (age 21)	6	0	(Football Association of Singapore) Young Lions
3	DF	Ikram Mikhail	5 August 2005 (age 21)	1	0	(Football Association of Singapore) Young Lions
4	DF	Nizwan Izzairie	26 January 2005 (age 21)	0	0	(Football Association of Singapore) Geylang International
5	DF	Merrick Tan	5 March 2006 (age 20)	0	0	(Football Association of Singapore) Balestier Khalsa
6	DF	Tarunn Kannan		0	0	(Football Association of Singapore) Tanjong Pagar United
7	FW	Syazwan Latiff	21 February 2006 (age 20)	0	0	(Football Association of Singapore) Geylang International
8	MF	Yasir Nizamudin	21 January 2005 (age 21)	0	0	(Football Association of Singapore) Hounang United
9	FW	Kian Ghadessy	6 December 2005 (age 20)	0	0	(Football Association of Singapore) Lion City Sailors
10	FW	Jonan Tan	27 June 2006 (age 20)	0	0	(Football Association of Singapore) Young Lions
11	DF	Fairuz Fazli	20 January 2005 (age 21)	3	0	(Football Association of Singapore) Young Lions
12	GK	Rauf Erwan	25 April 2005 (age 21)	0	0	(Football Association of Singapore) Young Lions
13	FW	Louka Tan	13 June 2005 (age 21)	0	0	(Football Association of Singapore) Hounang United
14	DF	Syafi Suhaimi		0	0	(Football Association of Singapore) Geylang International
15	MF	Andy Reefqy	14 July 2008 (age 18)	3	1	(Football Association of Singapore) Lion City Sailors
16	MF	Loo Kai Sheng	9 January 2007 (age 19)	0	0	(Football Association of Singapore) Young Lions
17	DF	Shaddiq Mansor	20 March 2006 (age 20)	0	0	(Football Association of Singapore) Tampines Rovers
18	GK	Ryan Effendy		0	0	(Football Association of Singapore) Tanjong Pagar United
19	MF	Sahoo Garv	26 March 2006 (age 20)	0	0	(Football Association of Singapore) Young Lions
20	FW	Taressh Kannan		0	0	(Football Association of Singapore) Tanjong Pagar United
21	MF	Rasul Ramli	26 March 2007 (age 19)	0	0	(Football Association of Singapore) Young Lions
22	DF	Danish Haqimi	22 March 2007 (age 19)	0	0	(Football Association of Singapore) Young Lions
23	DF	Marcus Moses	21 January 2005 (age 21)	0	0	(Football Association of Singapore) Lion City Sailors

=== Thailand ===
Head coach: (Brazil) Emerson Pereira

No.	Pos.	Player	Date of birth (age)	Caps	Goals	Club
1	GK	Kittipong Bunmak (captain)	22 March 2005 (age 21)	0	0	(Football Association of Thailand) Buriram United
2	DF	Pikanet Laohawiwat	4 March 2005 (age 21)	0	0	(Football Association of Thailand) MH Nakhon Si City
3	DF	Pattaraburin Jannawan	5 July 2005 (age 21)	0	0	(Football Association of Thailand) Nongbua Pitchaya
4	DF	Jhetsaphat Kuanthanom		0	0	(Football Association of Thailand) Buriram United
5	DF	Singha Marasa	19 August 2006 (age 20)	0	0	(Football Association of Thailand) Buriram United
6	MF	Rapeephat Padthaisong	12 December 2005 (age 20)	0	0	(Football Association of Thailand) Suphanburi
7	FW	Thanawut Phochai	2 December 2005 (age 20)	0	0	(Football Association of Thailand) Nongbua Pitchaya
8	MF	Dutsadee Buranajutanon	7 March 2006 (age 20)	0	0	(Football Association of Thailand) Buriram United
9	FW	Caelan Ryan	12 October 2005 (age 20)	0	0	(The Football Association) Port Vale
10	MF	Thanakrit Chotmuangpak	1 September 2006 (age 20)	0	0	(Football Association of Thailand) Buriram United
11	MF	Rattapoom Pankejohn		0	0	(Football Association of Thailand) Buriram United
12	GK	Phijak Donwithai	14 December 2006 (age 19)	0	0	(Football Association of Thailand) Prime Bangkok
13	MF	Siradanai Phosri	6 September 2005 (age 21)	0	0	(Football Association of Thailand) Assumption United
14	MF	Jirapong Pungviravong	20 September 2006 (age 20)	0	0	(Football Association of Thailand) Buriram United
15	DF	Piyawat Petra	15 March 2005 (age 21)	0	0	(Football Association of Thailand) Buriram United
16	DF	Pakawat Taengoakson	28 February 2005 (age 21)	0	0	(Football Association of Thailand) MH Nakhon Si City
17	MF	Chanothai Kongmeng	7 March 2006 (age 20)	0	0	(Football Association of Thailand) Buriram United
18	DF	Jirapol Saelio		0	0	(Football Association of Thailand) Buriram United
19	MF	Paripan Wongsa	19 March 2005 (age 21)	0	0	(Football Association of Thailand) Kanchanaburi City
20	FW	Pitipong Wongbut	29 April 2005 (age 21)	0	0	(Football Association of Thailand) Udon United
21	MF	Nattapakun Promthongmee	28 November 2005 (age 20)	0	0	(Football Association of Thailand) Buriram United
22	MF	Phongsakorn Sangkasopha	19 October 2006 (age 19)	0	0	(Football Association of Thailand) Ratchaburi
23	GK	Anut Samran		0	0	(Football Association of Thailand) Buriram United
