= Marselinus Ama Ola =

Indonesian footballer (born 2005)

Personal information
- Full name: Marselinus Ama Ola
- Date of birth: 21 March 2005 (age 21)
- Place of birth: East Flores, Indonesia
- Height: 1.70 m (5 ft 7 in)
- Position: Winger

Team information
- Current team: Persik Kediri
- Number: 23

Youth career
- SSB Bintang Ragunan
- 2019–2022: ASIOP
- 2023: Logroñés

Senior career*
Years	Team	Apps	(Gls)
2024–2025	Logroñés B	18	(3)
2025–2026	Persikad Depok	20	(3)
2026–	Persik Kediri	0	(0)

International career^{‡}
2024–2025	Indonesia U20	8	(0)
Medal record
Men's football
Representing Indonesia
ASEAN U-19 Boys Championship
Winner	2024 Indonesia	Team
- * Club domestic league appearances and goals as of 2 May 2026 ‡ National team caps and goals as of 19 February 2025

Marselinus Ama Ola (born 21 March 2005) is an Indonesian professional footballer who plays as a winger for Super League club Persik Kediri.

== Early life ==
Ola was born on 21 March 2005, in East Flores Regency, Indonesia. A native of Lamaholot ethnicity, He was born to Sebastianus Suban Doni Atagoran (father) and Mujiyanti (mother). His parents are known to come from the village of Horowura in Central Adonara. He has an older brother and attended SMP Pattimura Jagakarsa in Indonesia.

== Club career ==
As a youth player, Ola joined the youth academy of Indonesian side SSB Bintang Ragunan, where he was regarded as one of the club's key players. In 2019, he joined the youth academy of Indonesian side ASIOP, helping the club's under-18 team win the league title. Subsequently, he joined the youth academy of Spanish side Logroñés in 2023, before being promoted to the club's reserve team in 2024.

== Style of play ==
Ola plays as a winger or as a forward and is left-footed. Indonesian news website Bola.com wrote in 2025 that he is "agile and nimble... a fighter on the left side of the attack. His thrusts are often unexpected... a very calm and calculating player".

== Honours ==
=== International ===
Indonesia U-19

- ASEAN U-19 Boys Championship: 2024
