= Welber Jardim =

Indonesian footballer (born 2007)

Personal information
- Full name: Welberlieskott de Halim Jardim
- Date of birth: 25 April 2007 (age 19)
- Place of birth: Banjarmasin, Indonesia
- Height: 1.80 m (5 ft 11 in)
- Positions: Central midfielder; right-back

Team information
- Current team: São Paulo

Youth career
- 2014–2017: Palmeiras
- 2017–2018: Centro da Corôa
- 2018–: São Paulo

International career^{‡}
Years	Team	Apps	(Gls)
2023	Indonesia U17	3	(0)
2024–	Indonesia U20	23	(0)
Medal record
Men's football
Representing Indonesia
ASEAN U-19 Boys Championship
Winner	2024 Indonesia	Team
- ‡ National team caps and goals as of 6 September 2026

Welberlieskott de Halim Jardim (born 25 April 2007), commonly known as Welber Jardim or Well, is an Indonesian footballer who plays as a central midfielder or a right-back for Brazilian club São Paulo.

== Early life ==
Born in Banjarmasin, Jardim is the son of former Brazilian footballer Elisangelo Jardim de Jesus, who played for Persekaba Badung and Persiba Balikpapan in Indonesia and an Indonesian mother of Chinese descent, Lielyana Halim, also from Banjarmasin.

== Club career ==
At the age of five, his family relocated to Brazil, and he reportedly spent three years with professional side Palmeiras before joining local amateur side Centro da Corôa in 2017. The following year, he joined the academy of professional side São Paulo, and went on to win the 2019 editions of the Gothia Cup, the Dana Cup and the Madewis Cup held in Sweden, Denmark and France, respectively. On 7 March 2025, Jardim officially signed a professional contract with the club.

== International career ==
Jardim is eligible to represent both Brazil and Indonesia at international level. In March 2023, his father stated that, were he to be approached by Indonesia, Jardim would accept their call-up. Later in the same year, the Football Association of Indonesia (PSSI) attempted to call Jardim up to the Indonesian under-17 team, but failed to send correspondence requesting his presence to his club, São Paulo, and instead only asked his parents. Indonesia under-17 manager, Bima Sakti, later clarified that the PSSI had contacted Jardim's parents in order to confirm his availability for the Indonesia national team.

Having confirmed his availability, Sakti called Jardim up to the squad for training matches in August 2023. He featured in a 3–0 win against the under-17 side of Persis Solo, before returning to São Paulo, who had released him for only two weeks to attend the training camp. Following the camp, Sakti said of Jardim: "His achievements match his quality. We can see him in training. It's different if you already have quality. We will probably bring him to Germany [for another training camp]."

In September 2023, under-17 manager Bima Sakti confirmed that Jardim had received his Indonesian passport, enabling him to represent the nation at the 2023 FIFA U-17 World Cup. Later in the same month, having won an under-17 cup in Brazil with São Paulo, he travelled to Germany to compete in friendly games for the Indonesia under-17 side.

On 10 November 2023, Jardim made his official debut for the national under-17 team against Ecuador U-17 in the first match of the 2023 FIFA U-17 World Cup, which ends in a 1–1 draw.

On 13 March 2024, Jardim got called up to the Indonesia U-20 team for two friendly matches against China U-20.

In June 2024, he took part in the Maurice Revello Tournament in France.

== Style of play ==
Predominantly a right wing-back, Jardim has also operated higher up the pitch as a right-winger, and was nicknamed the Neymar from Indonesia by local media in Brazil.

== Personal life ==
Despite leaving Indonesia at the age of five, Jardim is fluent in Indonesian.

== Honours ==
Indonesia U19

- ASEAN U-19 Boys Championship: 2024
