= Kadek Arel =

Indonesian footballer (born 2005)

Personal information
- Full name: Kadek Arel Priyatna
- Date of birth: 4 April 2005 (age 21)
- Place of birth: Denpasar, Indonesia
- Height: 1.84 m (6 ft 0 in)
- Position: Centre-back

Team information
- Current team: Bali United
- Number: 4

Youth career
- 2019–2023: Bali United

Senior career*
Years	Team	Apps	(Gls)
2023–	Bali United	71	(0)

International career^{‡}
2019–2020	Indonesia U16	5	(0)
2022–2025	Indonesia U20	28	(4)
2023–	Indonesia U23	20	(0)
2024–	Indonesia	4	(1)
Medal record
Men's football
Representing Indonesia
ASEAN U-16 Boys Championship
Third place	2019 Thailand
ASEAN U-19 Boys Championship
Winner	2024 Indonesia	Team
ASEAN U-23 Championship
Runner-up	2023 Thailand	Team
Runner-up	2025 Indonesia	Team
- * Club domestic league appearances and goals as of 20 September 2026 ‡ National team caps and goals as of 12 December 2025

Kadek Arel Priyatna (born 4 April 2005) is an Indonesian professional footballer who plays as a centre-back for Super League club Bali United and the Indonesia national team.

== Club career ==
=== Bali United ===
On 12 January 2023, Kadek officially signed a contract with Bali United. He made his official debut against Persita in the 2022–23 Liga 1.

== International career ==
On 30 May 2022, Kadek made his debut for the Indonesia under-20 national team against Venezuela U20 in the 2022 Maurice Revello Tournament in France.

In September 2023, he was a part of the Indonesia U23 squad in the 2022 Asian Games tournament led by Indra Sjafri.

Kadek was once again called by Sjafri to the Indonesia U20 team to participate at the 2024 Maurice Revello Tournament.

On 25 November 2024, Kadek received a called up to the preliminary squad to the Indonesia national team for the 2024 ASEAN Championship. He made his debut against Myanmar in a 1–0 victory.

== Career statistics ==
=== Club ===
As of 20 September 2026

Club	Season	League		Cup		Continental		Other		Total	
Club	Season	Apps	Goals	Apps	Goals	Apps	Goals	Apps	Goals	Apps	Goals
Bali United	2022–23	5	0	0	0	0	0	0	0	5	0
Bali United	2023–24	16	0	0	0	2	0	0	0	18	0
Bali United	2024–25	17	0	0	0	0	0	0	0	17	0
Bali United	2025–26	30	0	0	0	0	0	0	0	30	0
Bali United	2026–27	3	0	0	0	0	0	0	0	3	0
Career total		71	0	0	0	2	0	0	0	73	0

=== International ===
As of match played 21 December 2024

Appearances and goals by national team and year
National team	Year	Apps	Goals
Indonesia	2024	4	1
Total		4	1

As of match played 28 August 2024

List of international under-20 goals scored by Kadek Arel
No.	Date	Venue	Opponent	Score	Result	Competition
1.	17 July 2024	Gelora Bung Tomo Stadium, Surabaya, Indonesia	Philippines	3–0	6–0	2024 ASEAN U-19 Boys Championship
2.	20 July 2024	Gelora Bung Tomo Stadium, Surabaya, Indonesia	Cambodia	1–0	2–0	2024 ASEAN U-19 Boys Championship
3.	23 July 2024	Gelora Bung Tomo Stadium, Surabaya, Indonesia	Timor-Leste	4–1	6–2	2024 ASEAN U-19 Boys Championship
4.	28 August 2024	Mokdong Stadium, Seoul, South Korea	Argentina	1–1	2–1	Seoul EOU Cup

As of match played 12 December 2024

List of international goals scored by Kadek Arel
No.	Date	Venue	Cap	Opponent	Score	Result	Competition
1	12 December 2024	Manahan Stadium, Surakarta, Indonesia	2	Laos	1–1	3–3	2024 ASEAN Championship

== Honours ==
Bali United U18

- Elite Pro Academy Liga 1 U-18: 2021

Indonesia U16

- ASEAN U-16 Boys Championship third place: 2019

Indonesia U19

- ASEAN U-19 Boys Championship: 2024

Indonesia U23

- AFF U-23 Championship runner-up: 2023, 2025
