= Caelan Ryan =

Thai footballer (born 2005)

Personal information
- Full name: Caelan Tanadon Ryan
- Date of birth: 12 October 2005 (age 21)
- Place of birth: Upton, England
- Height: 1.90 m (6 ft 3 in)
- Position: Centre forward

Team information
- Current team: Nakhon Si United (on loan from Port)
- Number: 19

Youth career
- 2013–2017: West Kirby Oanthets
- 2016–2017: Tranmere Rovers
- 2017–2018: Airbus UK Broughton
- –2021: The New Saints Development
- 2018–2024: Port Vale
- 2023–2024: Runcorn Linnets
- 2024: Market Drayton Town

Senior career*
Years	Team	Apps	(Gls)
2024–2025	Buriram United	0	(0)
2025	→ Sisaket United (loan)	2	(0)
2025–	Port	0	(0)
2026	→ Chanthaburi (loan)	3	(0)
2026–	Nakhon Si United	0	(0)

International career^{‡}
2024	Thailand U19	7	(4)
2024–	Thailand U20	7	(5)
Medal record
Men's football
Representing Thailand
Runner-up	Indonesia 2024	Team
- * Club domestic league appearances and goals as of 00:50, 5 February 2026 (UTC) ‡ National team caps and goals as of 11:05, 17 February 2025 (UTC)

Caelan Tanadon Ryan (Thai: เคแลน ธนาดอน ไรอัน; RTGS: Khelan Thanadon Rai-an, born 10 October 2005) is a professional footballer who plays as a centre forward for Thai League 3 club Nakhon Si United, on loan from Port. Born in England, he represents Thailand at youth level.

== Club career ==
=== Youth career ===
Ryan learnt to play football with the English clubs West Kirby Oanthets, Tranmere Rovers, Airbus UK Broughton, The New Saints, Port Vale, Runcorn Linnets and Market Drayton Town.

=== Thailand ===
In early July 2024, he moved to Thailand. There, he signed a contract with Buriram United, a top-flight club based in the city of the same name. He played for Buriram United U23 team in the 2024 Thai U23 League, and he and the team finished second. He did not play in the top flight. In mid-January 2025, he joined Thai League 2 club Sisaket United on loan. He made his second-tier debut for the Sisaket-based club on 29 March 2025 (matchday 30), playing in an away match against Kasetsart In the 1–0 defeat, he came on as a substitute for Ata Inia in the 75th minute. He made two second-division appearances for the club. After his loan spell ended, he returned to Buriram. However, his contract was not renewed. On 1 July 2025, he signed for Port, a top-flight club based in Bangkok. He did not feature for them in the first half of the top-flight season, however. In January 2026, he moved on loan to second-tier side Chanthaburi FC, based in Chanthaburi. After three league matches, he moved on loan to Nakhon Si United in the summer of 2026. They had been relegated from the second tier. He currently plays for the club in the Southern Region of the third tier.

== International career ==
In 2024, Ryan represented Thailand U19 at the ASEAN U19 Boys' Championship in Indonesia. The team made it to the final, but lost 0–1 to Indonesia, the hosts. The following year, he represented the U20 team at the 2025 U20 Asian Cup in China. The team were knocked out after the group stage.

== Honours ==
Buriram United U23

- Thai U23 League: 2024

Thailand U19

- ASEAN U-19 Boys Championship runner-up: 2024
