= Ikram Algiffari =

Indonesian footballer (born 2006)

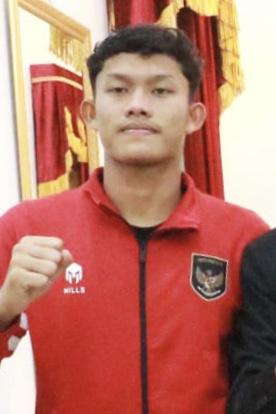
- Algiffari in 2022

Personal information
- Full name: Ikram Algiffari
- Date of birth: 6 June 2006 (age 20)
- Place of birth: Pesisir Selatan, Indonesia
- Height: 1.83 m (6 ft 0 in)
- Position: Goalkeeper

Team information
- Current team: Semen Padang
- Number: 12

Youth career
- 2016–2021: SSB Remaja Terusan
- 2021: PPLP West Sumatra
- 2021–2022: PSP Padang
- 2022–: Semen Padang

Senior career*
Years	Team	Apps	(Gls)
2023–	Semen Padang	2	(0)
2025–2026	→ Bekasi City (loan)	20	(0)

International career^{‡}
2022–2023	Indonesia U17	4	(0)
2024–2025	Indonesia U20	22	(0)
Medal record
Men's football
Representing Indonesia
ASEAN U-16 Boys Championship
Winner	2022 Indonesia
ASEAN U-19 Boys Championship
Winner	2024 Indonesia	Team
- * Club domestic league appearances and goals as of 13 September 2026 ‡ National team caps and goals as of 16 February 2025

Ikram Algiffari (born 6 June 2006) is an Indonesian professional footballer who plays as a goalkeeper for Championship club Semen Padang.

== Club career ==
=== Semen Padang ===
On 24 November 2022, he joined Liga 2 club Semen Padang.

== International career ==
Ikram was the Indonesia under-17 main goalkeeper in the 2023 FIFA U-17 World Cup.

In December 2023, Ikram got called up to the Indonesia under-20 team by head coach Indra Sjafri to a training camp in Jakarta.

Algiffari was called by coach Indra Sjafri to the Indonesia U20 team to participate at the 2024 Maurice Revello Tournament.

On 25 November 2024, Ikram received a called up to the preliminary squad to the Indonesia national team for the 2024 ASEAN Championship.

== Honours ==
Semen Padang

- Liga 2 runner-up: 2023–24

Indonesia U-17

- ASEAN U-16 Boys Championship: 2022

Indonesia U-19

- ASEAN U-19 Boys Championship: 2024

Individual

- ASEAN U-19 Boys Championship Best Goalkeeper: 2024
- Liga 2 Best Young Player: 2025–26
- Liga 2 Team of the Season: 2025–26
