= 2025 ASEAN U-23 Championship squads =

Football team member listings

The following is a list of squads for all ten national teams that are competing at the 2025 ASEAN U-23 Championship.

Players born on or after 1 January 2002 are eligible to participate and ten national teams affiliated with the ASEAN Football Federation (AFF) and participating in this tournament are required to register a squad containing up to 23 players, including three goalkeepers. Only the players from the following squad list are allowed to appear in this tournament.

The club listed is the last club where the player concerned plays a competitive match before the tournament.

Age, caps, goals and club as of 15 July 2025.

== Group A ==
=== Indonesia ===
Indonesia called up 28 players in their preliminary squad on 16 June 2025. The final squad was announced on 14 July 2025.

Head coach: (Netherlands) Gerald Vanenburg

No.	Pos.	Player	Date of birth (age)	Caps	Goals	Club
1	GK	Muhammad Ardiansyah	23 March 2003 (aged 22)	0	0	(Football Association of Indonesia) PSM Makassar
2	DF	Muhammad Ferarri (captain)	21 June 2003 (aged 22)	17	2	(Football Association of Indonesia) Persija Jakarta
3	DF	Kakang Rudianto	22 August 2003 (aged 21)	0	0	(Football Association of Indonesia) Persib Bandung
4	DF	Kadek Arel	4 April 2005 (aged 20)	8	0	(Football Association of Indonesia) Bali United
5	DF	Dony Tri Pamungkas	11 January 2005 (aged 20)	6	0	(Football Association of Indonesia) Persija Jakarta
6	MF	Robi Darwis	22 August 2003 (aged 21)	7	0	(Football Association of Indonesia) Persib Bandung
7	MF	Toni Firmansyah	14 January 2005 (aged 20)	0	0	(Football Association of Indonesia) Persebaya Surabaya
8	MF	Rayhan Hannan	2 April 2004 (aged 21)	3	0	(Football Association of Indonesia) Persija Jakarta
9	FW	Yardan Yafi	15 January 2004 (aged 21)	0	0	(Football Association of Indonesia) Persita Tangerang
10	MF	Arkhan Fikri	28 December 2004 (aged 20)	10	0	(Football Association of Indonesia) Arema
11	FW	Rahmat Arjuna	30 April 2004 (aged 21)	0	0	(Football Association of Indonesia) Bali United
12	FW	Hokky Caraka	21 August 2004 (aged 20)	5	1	(Football Association of Indonesia) PSS Sleman
13	DF	Alfharezzi Buffon	28 April 2006 (aged 19)	0	0	(Football Association of Indonesia) Borneo Samarinda
14	MF	Dominikus Dion	14 October 2004 (aged 20)	0	0	(Football Association of Indonesia) PSS Sleman
15	MF	Firman Juliansyah	7 July 2003 (aged 22)	0	0	(Football Association of Indonesia) Semen Padang
16	FW	Althaf Indie	3 January 2003 (aged 22)	0	0	(Football Association of Indonesia) Persis Solo
17	MF	Victor Dethan	11 July 2004 (aged 21)	0	0	(Football Association of Indonesia) PSM Makassar
18	DF	Brandon Scheunemann	9 March 2005 (aged 20)	0	0	(Football Association of Indonesia) Arema
19	DF	Frengky Missa	20 February 2004 (aged 21)	4	0	(Football Association of Indonesia) Bhayangkara Presisi
20	DF	Achmad Maulana	24 April 2003 (aged 22)	1	0	(Football Association of Indonesia) Arema
21	FW	Jens Raven	12 October 2005 (aged 19)	0	0	(Royal Dutch Football Association) Dordrecht
22	GK	Cahya Supriadi	11 February 2003 (aged 22)	0	0	(Football Association of Indonesia) Bekasi City
23	GK	Daffa Fasya	7 May 2004 (aged 21)	0	0	(Football Association of Indonesia) Borneo Samarinda

=== Malaysia ===
Malaysia announced their 30-men preliminary squad on 25 June 2025. The final squad was announced on 13 July.

Head coach: Nafuzi Zain

No.	Pos.	Player	Date of birth (age)	Club
1	GK	Syahmi Adib	30 March 2003 (aged 22)	(Football Association of Malaysia) Negeri Sembilan
2	DF	Faris Danish	4 July 2006 (aged 19)	(Football Association of Malaysia) Johor Darul Ta'zim
3	DF	Ubaidullah Shamsul	30 November 2003 (aged 21)	(Football Association of Malaysia) Terengganu
4	DF	Alif Ahmad	2 January 2003 (aged 22)	(Football Association of Malaysia) Johor Darul Ta'zim
5	DF	Shafizan Arshad	15 August 2005 (aged 19)	(Football Association of Malaysia) Johor Darul Ta'zim
6	MF	Danish Hakimi	6 January 2005 (aged 20)	(Football Association of Malaysia) Johor Darul Ta'zim
7	FW	Haqimi Azim	6 January 2003 (aged 22)	(Football Association of Malaysia) Kuala Lumpur City
8	MF	Muhammad Khalil	11 April 2005 (aged 20)	(Football Association of Thailand) Nakhon Pathom United
9	MF	Ziad El Basheer	24 December 2003 (aged 21)	(Football Association of Malaysia) Johor Darul Ta'zim
10	MF	Haykal Danish	5 May 2005 (aged 20)	(Football Association of Malaysia) Selangor
11	FW	Aliff Izwan	10 February 2004 (aged 21)	(Football Association of Malaysia) Selangor
12	DF	Arif Ilham	28 September 2003 (aged 21)	(Football Association of Malaysia) Kuala Lumpur City
13	DF	Aysar Hadi	4 September 2003 (aged 21)	(Football Association of Malaysia) Johor Darul Ta'zim
14	DF	Aiman Hakimi	28 January 2005 (aged 20)	(Football Association of Malaysia) Selangor
15	FW	Fergus Tierney	19 March 2003 (aged 22)	(Football Association of Thailand) Nakhon Pathom United
16	GK	Zulhilmi Sharani	4 May 2004 (aged 21)	(Football Association of Malaysia) Johor Darul Ta'zim
17	FW	Nabil Qayyum	25 February 2004 (aged 21)	(Football Association of Malaysia) Selangor
18	MF	Aiman Danish	16 November 2003 (aged 21)	(Football Association of Malaysia) Johor Darul Ta'zim
19	FW	Rahman Daud	4 December 2004 (aged 20)	(Football Association of Malaysia) Selangor
20	MF	Danish Syamer	8 July 2004 (aged 21)	(Football Association of Malaysia) Johor Darul Ta'zim
21	DF	Aiman Yusuf	6 March 2006 (aged 19)	(Football Association of Malaysia) Mokhtar Dahari Academy
22	MF	Haziq Kutty Abba	28 September 2004 (aged 20)	(Football Association of Malaysia) Penang
23	GK	Haziq Aiman	19 January 2005 (aged 20)	(Football Association of Malaysia) Johor Darul Ta'zim

=== Philippines ===
Philippines announced their final squad on 14 July 2025.

Head coach: (Australia) Garrath McPherson

No.	Pos.	Player	Date of birth (age)	Caps	Goals	Club
1	GK	Nicholas Guimarães	9 August 2006 (aged 18)	0	0	(Japan Football Association) Juntendo University
2	DF	Noah Leddel	30 August 2003 (aged 21)	4	0	(United States Soccer Federation) Yale University
3	DF	Bryan Villanueva	30 July 2006 (aged 18)	0	0	(Philippine Football Federation) PFF Youth National Team
4	DF	Kamil Amirul	6 February 2004 (aged 21)	8	0	(Philippine Football Federation) Dynamic Herb Cebu
5	DF	Joshua Meriño	11 February 2005 (aged 20)	4	0	(Philippine Football Federation) PFF Youth National Team
6	MF	Gavin Muens (captain)	24 October 2004 (aged 20)	7	1	(Philippine Football Federation) Kaya–Iloilo
7	FW	Otu Banatao	11 November 2006 (aged 18)	0	0	(United States Soccer Federation) D.C. United
8	MF	Jax Peña	8 May 2006 (aged 19)	5	0	(United States Soccer Federation) Western Reserve Academy
9	FW	Andres Aldeguer	18 December 2003 (aged 21)	4	0	(Philippine Football Federation) One Taguig
10	FW	Karl Absalon	17 October 2003 (aged 21)	2	0	(Philippine Football Federation) PFF Youth National Team
11	FW	Dov Cariño	18 December 2003 (aged 21)	6	1	(Philippine Football Federation) PFF Youth National Team
12	MF	John Lucero	1 December 2003 (aged 21)	8	0	(Football Association of Thailand) Rayong
13	DF	Zachary Taningco	8 October 2004 (aged 20)	0	0	(Philippine Football Federation) Manila Digger
14	DF	Jaime Rosquillo	10 March 2003 (aged 22)	11	0	(Philippine Football Federation) Dynamic Herb Cebu
15	DF	Jian Caraig	6 August 2005 (aged 19)	1	0	(Philippine Football Federation) PFF Youth National Team
16	MF	Harry Nuñez	16 December 2004 (aged 20)	4	0	(Philippine Football Federation) Tuloy
17	MF	Edgar Aban Jr.	24 September 2004 (aged 20)	0	0	(Philippine Football Federation) PFF Youth National Team
18	FW	Theo Libarnes	6 June 2004 (aged 21)	0	0	(Philippine Football Federation) PFF Youth National Team
19	FW	Uriel Dalapo	8 August 2004 (aged 20)	0	0	(Philippine Football Federation) Davao Aguilas
20	FW	Javier Mariona	17 October 2004 (aged 20)	0	0	(United States Soccer Federation) AV Alta
21	DF	Cian Galsim	13 January 2004 (aged 21)	0	0	(Philippine Football Federation) PFF Youth National Team
22	GK	Iñigo Castro	2 July 2006 (aged 19)	0	0	(Philippine Football Federation) PFF Youth National Team
23	GK	Alfonso Gonzalez	5 January 2005 (aged 20)	0	0	(Philippine Football Federation) PFF Youth National Team

=== Brunei ===
Brunei announced their final squad on 12 July 2025.

Head coach: (Brunei) Aminuddin Jumat

No.	Pos.	Player	Date of birth (age)	Caps	Goals	Club
1	GK	Khairul Hisyam Norihwan	7 August 2004 (aged 20)	1	0	(Football Association of Brunei Darussalam) DPMM
2	DF	Abdul Qayyum Irwan Rino	14 August 2004 (aged 20)	0	0	(Football Association of Brunei Darussalam) Rimba Star
3	DF	Danisyh Syariee Masrazni	11 September 2004 (aged 20)	3	0	(Football Association of Brunei Darussalam) Kasuka
4	DF	Azrin Danial Yusra	11 February 2006 (aged 19)	1	0	(Football Association of Brunei Darussalam) DPMM
5	DF	Wafiq Danish Hasimulabdillah	13 January 2005 (aged 20)	8	1	(Football Association of Brunei Darussalam) Kasuka
6	DF	Abdul Hafiy Herman	6 February 2005 (aged 20)	5	0	(Football Association of Brunei Darussalam) Kasuka
7	MF	Ali Munawwar Abdul Rahman	30 June 2004 (aged 21)	7	0	(Football Association of Brunei Darussalam) MS ABDB
8	MF	Khairan Zikry Zulkhairi	9 January 2003 (aged 22)	2	0	(Football Association of Brunei Darussalam) Kuala Belait
9	FW	Al-Kholil Sapawi	18 November 2005 (aged 19)	1	0	(Football Association of Brunei Darussalam) DPMM
10	FW	Bazli Aminuddin	24 June 2003 (aged 22)	7	0	(Football Association of Brunei Darussalam) Kasuka
11	MF	Syafiq Hilmi Shahrom	3 April 2006 (aged 19)	1	0	(Football Association of Brunei Darussalam) Kasuka
12	DF	Hadif Mansur Zulkarman	27 July 2004 (aged 20)	0	0	(Football Association of Brunei Darussalam) Kuala Belait
13	DF	Danish Aiman Sahrizul	23 January 2007 (aged 18)	1	0	(Football Association of Brunei Darussalam) Indera
14	MF	Hadi Aiman Hamizal	15 August 2006 (aged 18)	1	0	(Football Association of Brunei Darussalam) DPMM
15	DF	Abdul Raziq Saiful Faisal	1 December 2006 (aged 18)	0	0	(Football Association of Brunei Darussalam) DPMM
16	DF	Irfan Abdullah Ikhwan Chin	6 January 2006 (aged 19)	1	0	(Football Association of Brunei Darussalam) DPMM
17	MF	Azhari Danial Yusra	30 June 2003 (aged 22)	1	0	(Football Association of Brunei Darussalam) Indera
18	GK	Riyan Aiman Jali	9 January 2003 (aged 22)	0	0	(Football Association of Brunei Darussalam) Wijaya
19	FW	Haziq Naqiuddin Syamra	25 May 2004 (aged 21)	8	0	(Football Association of Brunei Darussalam) DPMM
20	GK	Wa'ie Haziq Wardun	4 August 2005 (aged 19)	0	0	(Football Association of Brunei Darussalam) Kasuka
21	MF	Shad Maymoun Jaafar	17 August 2003 (aged 21)	1	0	(Football Association of Brunei Darussalam) Kota Ranger
22	DF	Danish Firdaus Roddy Suhardy	23 January 2006 (aged 19)	0	0	(Football Association of Brunei Darussalam) DPMM
23	DF	Nazry Aiman Azaman	1 July 2004 (aged 21)	11	0	(Football Association of Brunei Darussalam) DPMM

== Group B ==
=== Vietnam ===
Vietnam announced their 36-man preliminary squad on 22 May. The final squad was announced on 12 July. On 17 July, Nguyễn Thanh Nhàn withdrew injured and was replaced by Lê Văn Thuận.

Head coach: (South Korea) Kim Sang-sik

No.	Pos.	Player	Date of birth (age)	Caps	Goals	Club
1	GK	Trần Trung Kiên	9 February 2003 (aged 22)	0	0	(Vietnam Football Federation) Hoàng Anh Gia Lai
2	DF	Lê Văn Hà	1 July 2004 (aged 21)	4	0	(Vietnam Football Federation) Hà Nội
3	DF	Phạm Lý Đức	14 February 2003 (aged 22)	0	0	(Vietnam Football Federation) Hoang Anh Gia Lai
4	DF	Nguyễn Hiểu Minh	5 August 2004 (aged 20)	6	1	(Vietnam Football Federation) PVF-CAND
5	DF	Nguyễn Đức Anh	16 May 2003 (aged 22)	8	0	(Vietnam Football Federation) SHB Đà Nẵng
6	MF	Nguyễn Thái Sơn	13 July 2003 (aged 22)	20	1	(Vietnam Football Federation) Đông Á Thanh Hóa
7	FW	Nguyễn Đình Bắc	19 August 2004 (aged 20)	11	2	(Vietnam Football Federation) Công An Hà Nội
8	MF	Nguyễn Văn Trường	10 September 2003 (aged 21)	24	0	(Vietnam Football Federation) Hà Nội
9	FW	Nguyễn Quốc Việt	4 May 2003 (aged 22)	28	7	(Vietnam Football Federation) Phù Đổng Ninh Bình
10	MF	Nguyễn Thành Đạt	6 June 2004 (aged 21)	3	0	(Vietnam Football Federation) Trường Tươi Bình Phước
11	MF	Khuất Văn Khang (captain)	11 May 2003 (aged 22)	28	3	(Vietnam Football Federation) Thể Công-Viettel
12	MF	Nguyễn Xuân Bắc	3 February 2003 (aged 22)	6	0	(Vietnam Football Federation) PVF-CAND
13	GK	Nguyễn Tân	16 July 2005 (aged 19)	1	0	(Vietnam Football Federation) Bà Rịa-Vũng Tàu
14	MF	Viktor Le	10 November 2003 (aged 21)	3	0	(Vietnam Football Federation) Hồng Lĩnh Hà Tĩnh
15	DF	Đặng Tuấn Phong	7 February 2003 (aged 22)	2	0	(Vietnam Football Federation) Thể Công-Viettel
16	DF	Nguyễn Nhật Minh	27 July 2003 (aged 21)	5	0	(Vietnam Football Federation) Hải Phòng
17	MF	Nguyễn Phi Hoàng	27 March 2003 (aged 22)	9	0	(Vietnam Football Federation) SHB Đà Nẵng
18	MF	Nguyễn Công Phương	3 June 2006 (aged 19)	0	0	(Vietnam Football Federation) Thể Công-Viettel
19	FW	Nguyễn Ngọc Mỹ	20 February 2004 (aged 21)	0	0	(Vietnam Football Federation) Đông Á Thanh Hóa
20	DF	Võ Anh Quân	7 May 2004 (aged 21)	2	0	(Vietnam Football Federation) Phù Đổng Ninh Bình
21	MF	Phạm Minh Phúc	7 February 2004 (aged 21)	1	0	(Vietnam Football Federation) Công An Hà Nội
22	MF	Lê Văn Thuận	15 July 2006 (aged 19)	0	0	(Vietnam Football Federation) Đông Á Thanh Hóa
23	GK	Cao Văn Bình	8 January 2005 (aged 20)	8	0	(Vietnam Football Federation) Sông Lam Nghệ An

=== Laos ===
Laos announced their final squad on 11 July 2025.

Head coach: (South Korea) Ha Hyeok-jun

No.	Pos.	Player	Date of birth (age)	Club
1	GK	Kop Lokphathip	8 May 2006 (aged 19)	(Lao Football Federation) Ezra
2	DF	Phouluang Vinnavong	12 January 2005 (aged 20)	(Lao Football Federation) Champasak
3	DF	Khammanh Thapaseuth	30 November 2007 (aged 17)	(Lao Football Federation) Ezra
4	DF	Anantaza Siphongphan	9 November 2004 (aged 20)	(Lao Football Federation) Ezra
5	DF	Phetdavanh Somsanith (captain)	24 April 2004 (aged 21)	(Lao Football Federation) Master
6	MF	Chanthavixay Khounthoumphone	17 February 2004 (aged 21)	(Lao Football Federation) Ezra
7	MF	Sayfon Keohanam	11 July 2006 (aged 19)	(Football Association of Thailand) Suphanburi
8	MF	Damoth Thongkhamsavath	3 April 2004 (aged 21)	(Vietnam Football Federation) Đông Á Thanh Hóa
9	MF	Khonesavanh Keonuchanh	4 June 2004 (aged 21)	(Italian Football Federation) Rome City Institute
10	FW	Peter Phanthavong	15 February 2006 (aged 19)	(Lao Football Federation) Ezra
11	FW	Arvilai Siphavanh	6 May 2005 (aged 20)	(Lao Football Federation) PM Sekong
12	GK	Soulisak Manpaseuth	1 November 2008 (aged 16)	(Lao Football Federation) Champasak
13	DF	Aliyakone Phongsavanh	2 February 2006 (aged 19)	(Lao Football Federation) Ezra
14	FW	Somvang Chummani	2 April 2006 (aged 19)	(Lao Football Federation) GB Mazda
15	MF	Khampane Douangvilay	5 February 2004 (aged 21)	(Lao Football Federation) Master
16	DF	Saleumsay Phommavong	7 August 2003 (aged 21)	(Lao Football Federation) Ezra
17	MF	Phudthachak Vongsili	13 July 2005 (aged 20)	(Lao Football Federation) Chanthabouly
18	GK	Soulisak Souvankham	10 September 2007 (aged 17)	(Lao Football Federation) Chanthabouly
19	FW	Phousomboun Panyavong	20 June 2007 (aged 18)	(Lao Football Federation) Lao Army
20	DF	Chittakone Vannachone	24 December 2004 (aged 20)	(Lao Football Federation) Luang Prabang
21	DF	Xayasouk Keovisone	21 July 2006 (aged 18)	(Lao Football Federation) Ezra
22	DF	Oun Phetvongsa	29 September 2003 (aged 21)	(Lao Football Federation) Namtha United
23	MF	Bounpharng Xaysombath	5 February 2005 (aged 20)	(Lao Football Federation) Luang Prabang

=== Cambodia ===
The following 23 players were called up for the tournament.

Head coach: (Japan) Koji Gyotoku

No.	Pos.	Player	Date of birth (age)	Caps	Goals	Club
1	GK	Reth Lyheng	1 January 2004 (aged 21)			(Football Federation of Cambodia) Nagaworld
2	DF	Tum Makara	25 January 2006 (aged 19)			(Football Federation of Cambodia) Angkor Tiger
3	DF	Yang Phumin	22 January 2004 (aged 21)			(Football Federation of Cambodia) Tiffy Army
4	DF	Hout Vanneth	12 April 2004 (aged 21)			(Football Federation of Cambodia) Nagaworld
5	DF	Vorn Phalla	7 June 2004 (aged 21)			(Football Federation of Cambodia) Tiffy Army
6	DF	Im Vakhim	28 November 2003 (aged 21)			(Football Federation of Cambodia) Angkor Tiger
7	FW	Sou Menghong	27 March 2007 (aged 18)			(Football Federation of Cambodia) Bati Academy
8	MF	Kong Lyhour	5 August 2003 (aged 21)			(Football Federation of Cambodia) Visakha
9	FW	Hav Soknet	3 August 2003 (aged 21)			(Football Federation of Cambodia) ISI Dangkor Senchey
10	MF	Lucca Lim	14 September 2006 (aged 18)			(New Zealand Football) Auckland United
11	FW	Mon Rado	27 January 2004 (aged 21)			(Football Federation of Cambodia) Visakha
12	DF	Leng Nora	19 September 2004 (aged 20)			(Football Federation of Cambodia) Visakha
13	DF	Vann Vit	13 October 2003 (aged 21)			(Football Federation of Cambodia) Life Sihanoukville
14	MF	Sin Sovannmakara	6 December 2004 (aged 20)			(Football Federation of Cambodia) Visakha
15	MF	Chou Sinti	1 April 2003 (aged 22)			(Football Federation of Cambodia) PKR Svay Rieng
16	FW	Sam Ol Tina	19 January 2003 (aged 22)			(Football Federation of Cambodia) ISI Dangkor Senchey
17	MF	Khorn Narong	22 July 2003 (aged 21)			(Football Federation of Cambodia) Tiffy Army
18	DF	Phat Sokha	2 March 2003 (aged 22)			(Football Federation of Cambodia) Nagaworld
19	FW	Chanvibol Davit	24 April 2004 (aged 21)			(Football Federation of Cambodia) Angkor Tiger
20	MF	Uk Devin	27 September 2006 (aged 18)			(Football Federation of Cambodia) Life Sihanoukville
21	GK	Ron Chongmieng	4 May 2006 (aged 19)			(Football Federation of Cambodia) Life Sihanoukville
22	GK	Mat Lany	9 December 2005 (aged 19)			(Football Federation of Cambodia) Tiffy Army
23	FW	Soun Makara	6 January 2006 (aged 19)			(Football Federation of Cambodia) ISI Dangkor Senchey

== Group C ==
=== Thailand ===
Thailand announced their final squad on 9 July 2025.

Head coach: Thawatchai Damrong-Ongtrakul

No.	Pos.	Player	Date of birth (age)	Caps	Goals	Club
1	GK	Sorawat Phosaman	30 January 2003 (aged 22)			(Football Association of Thailand) Songkhla
2	DF	Kittiphat Kullapha	6 December 2004 (aged 20)			(Football Association of Thailand) Rayong
3	DF	Pattarapon Suksakit	19 August 2003 (aged 21)			(Football Association of Thailand) Sukhothai
4	DF	Chanapach Buaphan	22 March 2004 (aged 21)			(Japan Football Association) Nara
5	MF	Seksan Ratree	14 March 2003 (aged 22)			(Football Association of Thailand) Buriram United
6	MF	Sittha Boonlha (captain)	2 September 2004 (aged 20)			(Football Association of Thailand) Port
7	FW	Thanakrit Laorkai	22 December 2003 (aged 21)			(Japan Football Association) Tiamo Hirakata
8	FW	Thanawut Phochai	2 December 2005 (aged 19)			(Football Association of Thailand) Nongbua Pitchaya
9	FW	Yotsakorn Burapha	8 June 2005 (aged 20)			(Football Association of Thailand) PT Prachuap
10	FW	Chinnawat Prachuabmon	4 March 2004 (aged 21)			(Football Association of Thailand) Chiangrai United
11	FW	Narakorn Kangkratok	1 April 2003 (aged 22)			(Football Association of Thailand) Ayutthaya United
12	FW	Siraphop Wandee	22 January 2004 (aged 21)			(Football Association of Thailand) Chonburi
13	DF	Theekawin Chansri	17 February 2004 (aged 21)			(Football Association of Thailand) Muangthong United
14	FW	Phanthamit Praphanth	12 September 2003 (aged 21)			(Football Association of Thailand) PT Prachuap
15	DF	Chaiyaphon Otton	4 April 2003 (aged 22)			(Football Association of Thailand) Sukhothai
16	DF	Pichitchai Sienkrathok	18 May 2003 (aged 22)			(Football Association of Thailand) Police Tero
17	FW	Teerapat Pruetong	17 February 2007 (aged 18)			(Football Association of Thailand) BG Pathum United
18	MF	Songkhramsamut Namphueng	7 November 2003 (aged 21)			(Football Association of Thailand) Police Tero
19	FW	Chawanwit Saelao	12 October 2004 (aged 20)			(Football Association of Thailand) Prime Bangkok
20	GK	Sirasawut Wongruankhum	27 October 2005 (aged 19)			(Football Association of Thailand) Chiangrai United
21	DF	Phon-Ek Jensen	30 March 2003 (aged 22)			(Football Association of Thailand) PT Prachuap
22	DF	Sphon Noiwong	7 September 2005 (aged 19)			(Football Association of Thailand) Police Tero
23	GK	Chommaphat Boonloet	17 February 2003 (aged 22)			(Football Association of Thailand) Chonburi

=== Myanmar ===
Myanmar announced their final squad on 13 July 2025.

Head coach: (Japan) Hisashi Kurosaki

No.	Pos.	Player	Date of birth (age)	Caps	Goals	Club
1	GK	Naing Lin Aung	20 June 2004 (aged 21)	1	0	(Myanmar Football Federation) Thitsar Arman
2	DF	Htoo Wai Yan		1	0	(Myanmar Football Federation) Mahar United
3	DF	Sa Khant Chaw	15 July 2005 (aged 20)	1	0	(Myanmar Football Federation) Yadanarbon
4	DF	Myat Phone Khant		1	0	(Myanmar Football Federation) Thitsar Arman
5	MF	Arkar Kyaw	7 February 2003 (aged 22)	9	0	(Myanmar Football Federation) Mahar United
6	FW	Shine Wanna Aung	15 March 2006 (aged 19)	2	1	(Myanmar Football Federation) Thitsar Arman
7	MF	Moe Swe	31 May 2003 (aged 22)	4	1	(Myanmar Football Federation) Yadanarbon
8	FW	Zwe Man Thar	1 June 2005 (aged 20)	2	0	(Myanmar Football Federation) Hantharwaddy United
9	FW	Than Toe Aung	15 July 2003 (aged 22)	4	0	(Myanmar Football Federation) Hantharwaddy United
10	MF	Zaw Win Thein	1 March 2003 (aged 22)	9	0	(Myanmar Football Federation) Yangon United
11	FW	Saw Myo Zaw		1	0	(Myanmar Football Federation) Thitsar Arman
12	GK	Aung Pyae Phyo	21 June 2003 (aged 22)	2	0	(Myanmar Football Federation) Dagon Star United
13	DF	Khant Zin Hein	18 April 2005 (aged 20)	1	0	(Myanmar Football Federation) Mahar United
14	DF	Mar Tee No		1	0	(Myanmar Football Federation) ISPE
15	DF	Wai Yan Lin Thu	21 April 2004 (aged 21)	2	0	(Myanmar Football Federation) Ayeyawady United
16	DF	Samuel Ngai Kee	20 October 2005 (aged 19)	0	0	(Myanmar Football Federation) Yadanarbon
17	MF	Ye Yint Phyo	26 July 2003 (aged 21)	3	0	(Myanmar Football Federation) Ayeyawady United
18	MF	Swan Htet	12 April 2005 (aged 20)	6	1	(Myanmar Football Federation) Dagon Star United
19	MF	Thar Yar Win Htet	18 March 2004 (aged 21)	1	0	(Myanmar Football Federation) Yangon United
20	DF	Khon Choo Htoo	17 July 2006 (aged 18)	0	0	(Myanmar Football Federation) Yangon United
21	DF	Win Pyae Maung	22 February 2006 (aged 19)	0	0	(Myanmar Football Federation) ISPE
22	MF	Min Maw Oo	6 March 2005 (aged 20)	2	0	(Myanmar Football Federation) Thitsar Arman
23	GK	Hein Htet Soe	21 June 2003 (aged 22)	2	0	(Myanmar Football Federation) Ayeyawady United

=== Timor-Leste ===
Timor-Leste announced their final squad on 10 July 2025.

Head coach: (Chile) Simón Elissetche

No.	Pos.	Player	Date of birth (age)	Club
1	GK	Filonito Nogueira	16 November 2004 (aged 20)	(East Timor Football Federation) SLB Laulara
2	MF	Serafin da Costa		(East Timor Football Federation) DIT
3	DF	Liam Farrugia	13 January 2003 (aged 22)	(Football Australia) Manningham United
4	DF	Jackson Fowler	3 September 2004 (aged 20)	(Football Australia) Sydney Olympic
5	DF	Aidan Pereira	14 April 2006 (aged 19)	(Portuguese Football Federation) Trofense
6	MF	Palomito Ribeiro		(East Timor Football Federation) Emmanuel
7	FW	Kenny Ximenes	4 April 2005 (aged 20)	(Irish Football Association) Dollingstown
8	MF	Oatnasio da Silva	11 June 2006 (aged 19)	(Irish Football Association) Loughgall
9	FW	Olagar Xavier	18 May 2003 (aged 22)	(East Timor Football Federation) Karketu Dili
10	FW	Alexandro Bakhito	1 June 2006 (aged 19)	(East Timor Football Federation) SLB Laulara
11	MF	Zenivio (captain)	22 April 2005 (aged 20)	(Football Association of Singapore) Tanjong Pagar United
12	GK	Pablo de Jesus	19 September 2005 (aged 19)	(East Timor Football Federation) Ponta Leste
13	DF	Ricardo Bianco	15 January 2006 (aged 19)	(East Timor Football Federation) Ponta Leste
14	MF	Jorge Casimiro		(Football Australia) Caboolture Sports
15	MF	Leonio Freitas		(East Timor Football Federation) Ponta Leste
16	MF	Freteliano	9 August 2004 (aged 20)	(East Timor Football Federation) Emmanuel
17	DF	Mário Quintão	18 February 2004 (aged 21)	(East Timor Football Federation) Emmanuel
18	FW	Vabio Canavaro	25 January 2007 (aged 18)	(East Timor Football Federation) SLB Laulara
19	MF	Luís Figo	17 April 2005 (aged 20)	(East Timor Football Federation) Ponta Leste
20	GK	Egidio Luro		(East Timor Football Federation) Emmanuel
21	FW	Nicholas Fowler	31 May 2007 (aged 18)	(Football Australia) Sydney Olympic
22	DF	Sandro Rivaldo	1 January 2003 (aged 22)	(East Timor Football Federation) Emmanuel
23	DF	Anizo Correia	23 May 2003 (aged 22)	(East Timor Football Federation) Ponta Leste

== See also ==
- 2025 ASEAN Women's Championship squads
