= Dony Tri Pamungkas =

Indonesian footballer (born 2005)

- Dony Tri with Persija in 2026

Personal information
- Full name: Dony Tri Pamungkas
- Date of birth: 11 January 2005 (age 21)
- Place of birth: Boyolali, Indonesia
- Height: 1.77 m (5 ft 10 in)
- Positions: Left-back; left wing-back

Team information
- Current team: Persija Jakarta
- Number: 77

Youth career
- 2017–2020: PS Bina Taruna
- 2020–2021: Persija Jakarta

Senior career*
Years	Team	Apps	(Gls)
2021–	Persija Jakarta	91	(1)

International career^{‡}
2022–2025	Indonesia U20	35	(1)
2023–	Indonesia U23	19	(2)
2024–	Indonesia	12	(0)
Medal record
Men's football
Representing Indonesia
ASEAN U-19 Boys Championship
Winner	2024 Indonesia	Team
ASEAN U-23 Championship
Runner-up	2025 Indonesia	Team
- * Club domestic league appearances and goals as of 1 November 2026 ‡ National team caps and goals as of 7 August 2026

Dony Tri Pamungkas (born 11 January 2005) is an Indonesian professional footballer who plays as a left-back or left wing-back for Super League club Persija Jakarta and the Indonesia national team.

== Club career ==
=== Persija Jakarta ===
Dony signed for Persija Jakarta to play in Liga 1 for the 2021 season. He made his first-team debut on 28 September 2021 as a substitute in a match against Persita Tangerang at the Pakansari Stadium, Cibinong.

== International career ==
While playing for Persija U19 against Indonesia under-20 national team in a 2–1 win in an exhibition match, coach Shin Tae-yong was impressed with Dony's gameplay and decided to called him to the national team squad. On 14 September 2022, Dony made his debut for the under-20 team against East Timor U20, in a 4–0 win in the 2023 AFC U-20 Asian Cup qualification.

On 28 October 2022, Dony scored a goal against Turkey U20, on a 1–2 lost in a friendly match.

In March 2023, Dony was called up to the Indonesia senior team for two friendly matches against Burundi.

On 25 November 2024, Dony received a called up to the preliminary squad to the Indonesia national team for the 2024 ASEAN Championship. He made his debut against Myanmar in a 1–0 victory.

== Personal life ==
Dony is the younger brother of Joko Sasongko and both are not related to Bambang Pamungkas.

== Career statistics ==
=== Club ===
As of 23 May 2026

Club	Season	League			Cup		League Cup		Continental		Other		Total	
Club	Season	Division	Apps	Goals	Apps	Goals	Apps	Goals	Apps	Goals	Apps	Goals	Apps	Goals
Persija Jakarta	2021–22	Liga 1	10	0	0	0	–		–		0	0	10	0
Persija Jakarta	2022–23	Liga 1	14	0	0	0	–		–		2 (Note: Appearances in Indonesia President's Cup)	0	16	0
Persija Jakarta	2023–24	Liga 1	21	0	0	0	–		–		0	0	21	0
Persija Jakarta	2024–25	Liga 1	14	0	0	0	–		–		1 (Note: Appearances in Indonesia President's Cup)	0	15	0
Persija Jakarta	2025–26	Super League	26	1	0	0	–		–		0	0	22	1
Persija Jakarta	2026–27	Super League	6	0	0	0	1	0	–		0	0	7	0
Career total			91	1	0	0	1	0	0	0	3	0	95	1

=== International ===
As of match played 7 August 2026

Appearances and goals by national team and year
National team	Year	Apps	Goals
Indonesia	2024	4	0
Indonesia	2026	8	0
Total		12	0

=== International goals ===
International under-19 goals

No.	Date	Venue	Opponent	Score	Result	Competition
1.	26 October 2022	Antalya Atatürk Stadium, Manavgat, Turkey	Turkey	1–2	1–2	Friendly

International under-23 goals

No.	Date	Venue	Opponent	Score	Result	Competition
1.	10 October 2025	Madya Stadium, Jakarta, Indonesia	India	1–2	1–2	Friendly
2.	13 October 2025	Madya Stadium, Jakarta, Indonesia	India	1–1	1–1	Friendly

== Honours ==
Indonesia U19

- ASEAN U-19 Boys Championship: 2024

Indonesia U23

- ASEAN U-23 Championship runner-up: 2025

Individual

- ASEAN U-19 Boys Championship Best Player: 2024
- Super League Young Player of the Month: January 2026, February 2026, April 2026
- Super League Best XI: 2025–26
- Super League Best Young Player: 2025–26
- APPI Indonesian Football Award Best XI: 2025–26
- APPI Indonesian Football Award Best Young Footballer: 2025–26
