= 2003 AFF U-18 Youth Championship =

Tournament details
- Host countries: Myanmar; Vietnam
- City: Yangon; Ho Chi Minh City
- Dates: 7–18 June
- Teams: 9 (from 1 confederation)
- Venue: 2 (in 2 host cities)

Final positions
- Champions: Myanmar (1st title)
- Runners-up: Malaysia
- Third place: Singapore
- Fourth place: Vietnam

Tournament statistics
- Matches played: 20
- Goals scored: 73 (3.65 per match)

The 2003 AFF U-18 Youth Championship was held from 7 to 18 June 2003 and was co-hosted by Myanmar and Vietnam. This was the inaugural edition of the tournament.

== Participating nations ==
- Cambodia
- Indonesia
- Laos
- Malaysia
- Myanmar
- Philippines
- Singapore
- Thailand
- Vietnam

== Tournament ==
=== Group stage ===
==== Group A ====
- All matches played in Yangon, Myanmar
- All times are Myanmar Standard Time (MST) - UTC+6:30

Team	Pld	W	D	L	GF	GA	GD	Pts
Myanmar	3	2	1	0	14	3	+11	7
Singapore	3	2	1	0	6	3	+3	7
Thailand	3	1	0	2	6	7	−1	3
Laos	3	0	0	3	1	14	−13	0

7 June 2003
15:30

Laos	0 – 3	Thailand
		Jakrit Inthapho 35', 88'; Chakrit Buathong 78'

8 June 2003
15:30

Singapore	1 – 1	Myanmar
Fazrul Nawaz 61'		Tun Min Oo 1'

9 June 2003
17:30

Thailand	1 – 2	Singapore
Pondpisut Pue-On 9'		Mohd Firdaus 51'; Mohd Khairul Amri 60'

10 June 2003
17:30

Myanmar	6 – 0	Laos
Tun Min Oo 1', 34', 47'; Bo Bo Aung 5', 9'; Kyaw Zin Win ?', ?'; Tun Tun Win ?'

12 June 2003
15:30

Thailand	2 – 4	Myanmar
Pondpisut Pue-On 9'

13 June 2003
17:30

Laos	1 – 3	Singapore
Soulikhan Phanthaya 47'		Mohd Khairul 10'; Mohd Shafuan 55'; Mohammad Nurhadi 57'

==== Group B ====
- All matches played in Ho Chi Minh City, Vietnam
- All times are Indochina Time (ICT) - UTC+7

Team	Pld	W	D	L	GF	GA	GD	Pts
Malaysia	4	4	0	0	14	2	+12	12
Vietnam	4	3	0	1	15	3	+12	9
Indonesia	4	2	0	2	3	6	−3	6
Cambodia	4	1	0	3	3	9	−6	3
Philippines	4	0	0	4	1	16	−15	0

7 June 2003
14:00

Cambodia	0 – 1	Indonesia
		Putut Waringin Jati 2'

7 June 2003
16:00

Vietnam	1 – 2	Malaysia
Phan Thanh Binh 86'		Norshahrul Idlan 69', 70'

8 June 2003
14:00

Philippines	1 – 6	Vietnam
Meliton Pelayo 45'; Jason Mortillero (red card) second half'		Nguyen Tran Minh Hieu 4'; Phan Thanh Binh 5'; Nguyen Xuan Thanh 31'; Tran Hong Quan 64'; Le Xuan Hop 75'; Nguyen Anh Duc 88'

8 June 2003
16:00

Malaysia	3 – 0	Cambodia
Norshahrul Idlan 36'; Mohd Hafiz Sobri 46'; Fitri Omar 80' (pen.)

9 June 2003
16:00

Indonesia	1 – 0	Philippines
Putut Waringin Jati 63'

10 June 2003
14:00

Malaysia	3 – 1	Indonesia
Norshahrul Idlan 31'; Choi Woh Seng 47'; Mohd Hafiz Sobri Omar 78'		Putut Waringin Jati 36'

10 June 2003
16:00

Vietnam	5 – 0	Cambodia
Phan Than Binh 48'; Nguyen Vu Phong 50', 57'; Nguyen Anh Duc 75'; Doan Viet Cuong 86'

12 June 2003
14:00

Indonesia	0 – 3	Vietnam
		Thanh Binh 9', 60'; Nguyen Vu Pong 62'

12 June 2003
16:00

Philippines	0 – 6	Malaysia
		Norshahrul Idlan 19' (pen.), 37', 45'; Arman Esteban 27' (o.g.); Firdaus Yusoff 80'; Mohd Nurul Azwan 90'

13 June 2003
14:00

Cambodia	3 – 0	Philippines
Youerm Naran 18'; Tong Sotto 27'; Hao Sopha 86'

=== Knockout stage ===
- All matches played in Yangon, Myanmar
- All times are Myanmar Standard Time (MST) - UTC+6:30

==== Bracket ====
Semi-finals
16 June
Myanmar	2
Vietnam	0
16 June
Malaysia	2
Singapore	0

Final
18 June
Myanmar	4
Malaysia	0
Third place
18 June
Vietnam	1 (4)
Singapore (p)	1 (5)

==== Semi-finals ====
16 June 2003
15:30

Myanmar	2 – 0	Vietnam
Kyaw Zin Win 73'; Bo Bo Aung 80'

16 June 2003
18:00

Malaysia	2 – 0	Singapore
Mohd Hafiz Sobri Omar 41', 64'

==== Third place play-off ====
18 June 2003
15:00

Singapore	1 – 1	Vietnam
Fazrul Nawaz 9'		Phan Thanh Binh 32'
Penalties
	5 – 4

==== Final ====
18 June 2003
17:30

Myanmar	4 – 0	Malaysia
Kyaw Zin Win 20'; Myo Min Tun 43', 71'; Tun Min Oo 62'

== Winner ==
2003 AFF U-18 Youth Championship winners

Myanmar
First title
