= Hoàng Quang Dũng =

Vietnamese footballer (born 2005)

Personal information
- Full name: Hoàng Quang Dũng
- Date of birth: 18 February 2005 (age 21)
- Place of birth: Quảng Điền, Huế, Vietnam
- Height: 1.73 m (5 ft 8 in)
- Position: Midfielder

Team information
- Current team: Huế
- Number: 6

Youth career
- –2023: Huế

Senior career*
Years	Team	Apps	(Gls)
2023–	Huế	36	(1)

International career^{‡}
2024	Vietnam U20	6	(3)
2026–	Vietnam U23	1	(0)
- * Club domestic league appearances and goals as of 13 June 2026 ‡ National team caps and goals as of 22 September 2026

Hoàng Quang Dũng (born 18 February 2005) is a Vietnamese professional footballer who plays as a midfielder for V.League 2 club Huế.

== Club career ==
Born in Thừa Thiên Huế, Quang Dũng was trained at the local Huế FC. He captained the team in several youth categories and was promoted to the first team in 2023. He made his professional debut in the first matchday of the 2023–24 V.League 2, in a 0–2 away loss against SHB Đà Nẵng. On 24 December 2023, he scored his first career goal in the 1–2 away loss against PVF-CAND.

== International career ==
In July 2024, Quang Dũng was named for the Vietnam U20's squad for the 2024 ASEAN U-19 Boys Championship. Despite not having much gametime during the tournament, he left a big impression on the Vietnamese press with his 3 goals scored in 3 different games, with all of them being longshots from outside the penalty area.
