= Indra Sjafri =

Indonesian football coach and former footballer

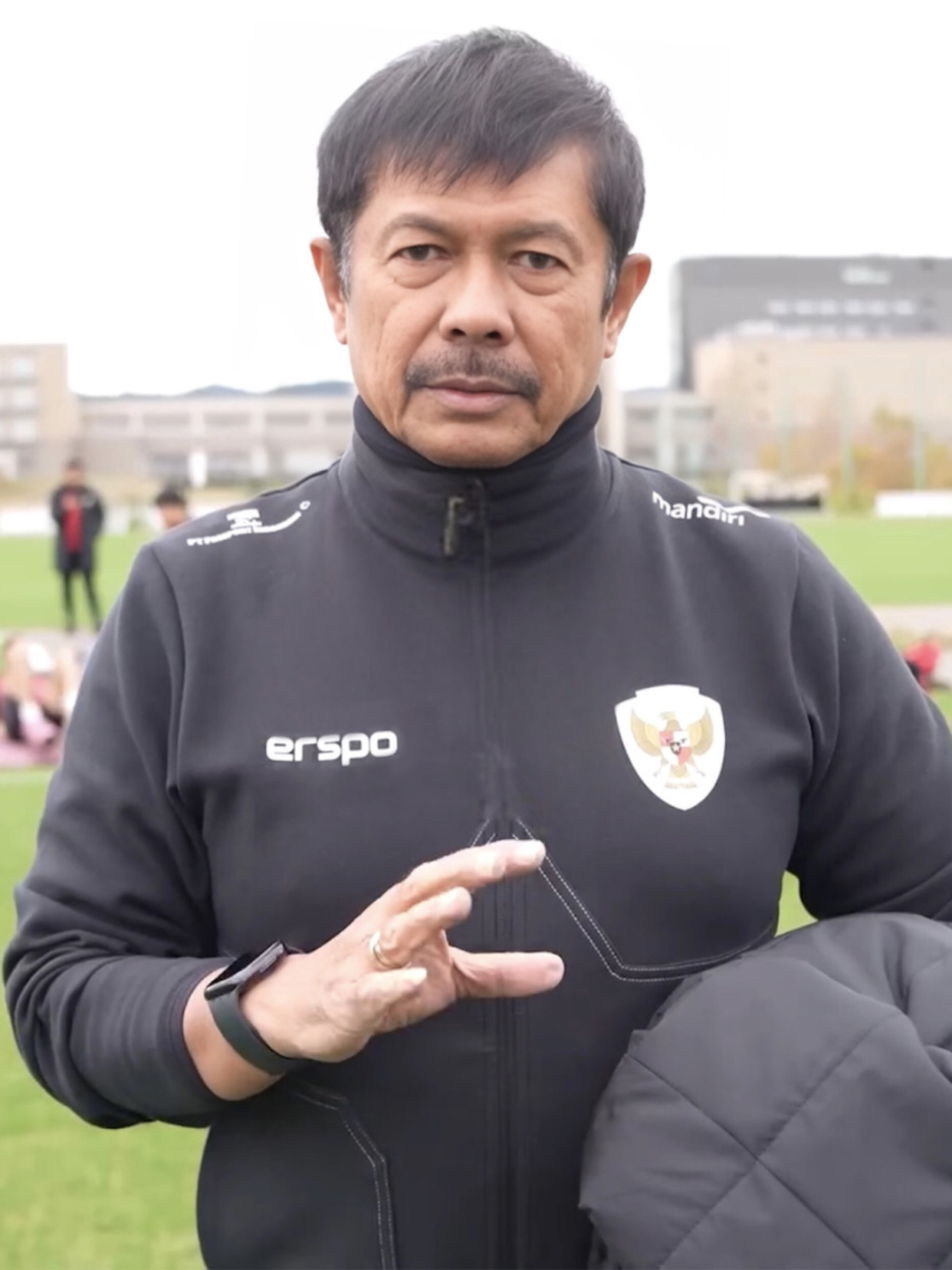
- Sjafri in 2024

Personal information
- Full name: Indra Sjafri
- Date of birth: 2 February 1963 (age 63)
- Place of birth: Pesisir Selatan, Indonesia
- Height: 1.69 m (5 ft 7 in)
- Position: Midfielder

Senior career*
Years	Team	Apps	(Gls)
1986–1991	PSP Padang		

Managerial career
- 2011: Indonesia U-16
- 2011–2014: Indonesia U-19
- 2014–2017: Bali United
- 2017–2018: Indonesia U-19
- 2019–2020: Indonesia U-23
- 2020–2023: Indonesia (technical director)
- 2023: Indonesia U-23
- 2023–2025: Indonesia U-20
- 2025: Indonesia U-23
Medal record
Representing Indonesia (as manager)
AFF U-23 Championship
Winner	2019 Cambodia	Team
Southeast Asian Games
Gold medal – first place	2023 Phnom Penh	Team
Silver medal – second place	2019 Manila	Team
ASEAN U-19 Boys Championship
Winner	2013 Indonesia	Team
Winner	2024 Indonesia	Team
- * Club domestic league appearances and goals

Indra Sjafri (born 2 February 1963) is a former Indonesian football player and was most recently the head coach of Indonesia U-23. Before getting into coaching, he was a branch manager at Pos Indonesia. He holds a Bachelor of Economics degree from Andalas University.

== Coaching license ==
- License C (1997)
- License B (1998)
- License A (1999)
- License Pro (2019)

== Managerial career ==
On 17 December 2014, he was appointed to be the head coach of Bali United.

Sjafri was the manager of the Indonesia U-23 team that won the 2023 SEA Games football tournament after a 32-year drought.

He was again appointed as the Indonesia U-23 manager for the 2022 Asian Games.

On 1 July 2023, Sjafri was again appointed as the head coach of the Indonesia U-20 team. He was relieved of his duties from the role on 23 February 2025, following an early group-stage exit in the 2025 AFC U-20 Asian Cup.

Following Gerald Vanenburg exit from the under-23 team. Sjafri was once again appointed as the head coach of the U-23 national team for the 2025 SEA Games with the hope of retaining the title. However, Indonesia would be knocked out from the group stage, following a lost from the Philippines. Following the early exit, Sjafri was dismissed entirely as a coach and part of the PSSI member.

== Honours ==
=== Manager ===
Indonesia U-19

- AFF U-19 Youth Championship
  - Champions: 2013, 2024

Indonesia U-23

- AFF U-22 Youth Championship
  - Champions: 2019
- SEA Games
  - Gold Medalist: 2023
  - Silver Medalist: 2019
