= 2024 ASEAN U-19 Boys Championship =

Kejuaraan Remaja U-19 ASEAN 2024

Tournament details
- Host country: Indonesia
- Dates: 17–29 July 2024
- Teams: 12 (from 1 sub-confederation)
- Venue: 2 (in 1 host city)

Final positions
- Champions: Indonesia (2nd title)
- Runners-up: Thailand
- Third place: Australia
- Fourth place: Malaysia

Tournament statistics
- Matches played: 22
- Goals scored: 88 (4 per match)
- Top scorer(s): (Australia) Jake Najdovski (5 goals)
- Best player: (Indonesia) Dony Tri Pamungkas
- Best goalkeeper: (Indonesia) Ikram Algiffari

The 2024 ASEAN U-19 Boys Championship was the 19th edition of the ASEAN U-19 Boys Championship, organised by ASEAN Football Federation. It was hosted by Indonesia from 17 to 29 July 2024. This was the first edition that took place after the tournament was rebranded to ASEAN Championship. Players born on or after 1 January 2005 could participate in this tournament.

== Participant teams ==
There was no qualification, and all entrants advanced to the final tournament. The following 12 teams from member associations of the ASEAN Football Federation entered the tournament.

| Team | Association | App | Previous best performance |
|---|---|---|---|
| Australia | Football Australia | 9th | Winners (2006, 2008, 2010, 2016, 2019) |
| Brunei | FA Brunei DS | 11th | Group stage (10 times) |
| Cambodia | FF Cambodia | 13th | Group stage (12 times) |
| Indonesia | FA Indonesia | 12th | Winners (2013, 2024) |
| Laos | Lao FF | 13th | Runners-up (2022) |
| Malaysia | FA Malaysia | 15th | Winners (2018, 2022) |
| Myanmar | Myanmar FF | 15th | Winners (2003, 2005) |
| Philippines | Philippine FF | 11th | Group stage (10 times) |
| Singapore | FA Singapore | 14th | Third place (2003) |
| Thailand | FA Thailand | 18th | Winners (2002, 2009, 2011, 2015, 2017) |
| Timor-Leste | FF Timor-Leste | 10th | Third place (2013) |
| Vietnam | Vietnam FF | 18th | Winners (2007) |

== Draw ==
The tournament's official draw was held on 30 May 2024 in Jakarta, Indonesia at 16:00 (GMT+07:00). The pot placements followed each teams progress based on the previous edition. Indonesia as the host were automatically assigned to pot 1 and position A1.

| Pot 1 | Pot 2 | Pot 3 | Pot 4 |
|---|---|---|---|
| Indonesia (H); Malaysia; Laos | Vietnam; Thailand; Timor-Leste | Myanmar; Cambodia; Singapore | Philippines; Brunei; Australia |

- (H): Tournament host

== Officials ==
The following officials were chosen for the competition. Video assistant referees (VAR) would be used from the semi-finals onwards.

Referees

- (Brunei) Abdul Hakim Mohd Haidi
- (China) Jin Jingyuan
- (Indonesia) Thoriq Alkatiri
- (Indonesia) Ryan Nanda Saputra
- (South Korea) Choi Hyun-jai
- (Malaysia) Razlan Joffri Ali
- (Oman) Yahya Ahmed Al Balushi
- (Philippines) Clifford Daypuyat
- (Saudi Arabia) Faisal Sulaiman Al Balawi
- (Thailand) Songkran Bunmeekiart
- (Thailand) Wiwat Jumpao-on
- (Vietnam) Ngô Duy Lân

Assistant Referees

- (Australia) Andrew Meimarakis
- (Cambodia) Kimsy Pisal
- (China) Tang Chao
- (Indonesia) Bangbang Syamsudar
- (South Korea) Cheon Jin-hee
- (Malaysia) Muhammad Shafiq Ahmad Said
- (Myanmar) Chit Moe Aye
- (Oman) Hamooh Said Hamed Al Shuaibi
- (Saudi Arabia) Faisal Nasser Al Qahtani
- (Singapore) Andy Tan Mint Land
- (Thailand) Kijsathit Pattarapong
- (Vietnam) Nguyễn Trung Việt

Video Assistant Referees

- (China) Jin Jingyuan
- (South Korea) Choi Hyun-jai
- (Saudi Arabia) Faisal Sulaiman Al Balawi
- (Thailand) Songkran Bunmeekiart
- (Thailand) Wiwat Jumpao-on

== Venues ==
In May 2024, the ASEAN Football Federation officially announced the 2 venues for the tournament which was located in Surabaya, East Java.

Surabaya
| Gelora Bung Tomo Stadium | Gelora 10 November Stadium |
| Capacity: 46,806 | Capacity: 20,000 |
2024 ASEAN U-19 Boys Championship is located in Java

== Group stage ==
=== Group A ===
| Pos | Team | Pld | W | D | L | GF | GA | GD | Pts | Qualification |
|---|---|---|---|---|---|---|---|---|---|---|
| 1 | Indonesia (H) | 3 | 3 | 0 | 0 | 14 | 2 | +12 | 9 | Knockout stage |
| 2 | Cambodia | 3 | 1 | 0 | 2 | 3 | 5 | −2 | 3 | |
| 3 | Timor-Leste | 3 | 1 | 0 | 2 | 5 | 10 | −5 | 3 | |
| 4 | Philippines | 3 | 1 | 0 | 2 | 2 | 7 | −5 | 3 | |

Rules for classification: Group stage tiebreakers
(H) Hosts
17 July 2024
15:00

| Timor-Leste | 3–2 | Cambodia |
|---|---|---|
| Canavaro 33'; Bahkito 36'; Figo 38' | Report | Borith 54'; Kimsong 60' |

Gelora Bung Tomo Stadium, Surabaya
Referee: Jin Jingyuan (China)
17 July 2024
19:30

| Indonesia | 6–0 | Philippines |
|---|---|---|
| Arlyansyah 12', 50'; Iqbal 21', 43'; Kadek 29'; Raven 87' | Report |

Gelora Bung Tomo Stadium, Surabaya
Referee: Faisal Sulaiman Al Balawi (Saudi Arabia)

20 July 2024
15:00

| Philippines | 2–0 | Timor-Leste |
|---|---|---|
| Banatao 11', 60' | Report |

Gelora Bung Tomo Stadium, Surabaya
Referee: Choi Hyun-jai (South Korea)
20 July 2024
19:30

| Cambodia | 0–2 | Indonesia |
|---|---|---|
| | Report | Kadek 71'; Iqbal 86' |

Gelora Bung Tomo Stadium, Surabaya
Referee: Yahya Ahmed Al Balushi (Oman)

23 July 2024
19:30

| Indonesia | 6–2 | Timor-Leste |
|---|---|---|
| Raven 18', 26'; Quintão 45+1' (o.g.); Kadek 51'; Arkhan 53'; Kafiatur 57' | Report | Bianco 23' (pen.); Bahkito 86' |

Gelora Bung Tomo Stadium, Surabaya
Referee: Choi Hyun-jai (South Korea)
23 July 2024
19:30

| Cambodia | 1–0 | Philippines |
|---|---|---|
| Sovannara 11' | Report |

Gelora 10 November Stadium, Surabaya
Referee: Jin Jingyuan (China)

=== Group B ===
| Pos | Team | Pld | W | D | L | GF | GA | GD | Pts | Qualification |
|---|---|---|---|---|---|---|---|---|---|---|
| 1 | Australia | 3 | 3 | 0 | 0 | 13 | 2 | +11 | 9 | Knockout stage |
| 2 | Vietnam | 3 | 1 | 1 | 1 | 7 | 8 | −1 | 4 | |
| 3 | Myanmar | 3 | 0 | 2 | 1 | 2 | 3 | −1 | 2 | |
| 4 | Laos | 3 | 0 | 1 | 2 | 2 | 11 | −9 | 1 | |

Rules for classification: Group stage tiebreakers
18 July 2024
15:00

| Laos | 0–6 | Australia |
|---|---|---|
| | Report | Sulemani 16', 25'; Younis 45+4', 73'; Najdovski 89', 90+4' |

Gelora 10 November Stadium, Surabaya
Referee: Songkran Bunmeekiart (Thailand)
18 July 2024
19:30

| Vietnam | 1–1 | Myanmar |
|---|---|---|
| Hoàng Quang Dũng 69' | Report | Phyo Pyae Sone 60' |

Gelora 10 November Stadium, Surabaya
Referee: Razlan Joffri Ali (Malaysia)

21 July 2024
15:00

| Australia | 6–2 | Vietnam |
|---|---|---|
| Najdovski 19', 40', 66'; Sulemani 49'; Helweh 74'; Vickery 90+7' | Report | Hoàng Quang Dũng 57'; Nguyễn Bảo Long 86' (pen.) |

Gelora 10 November Stadium, Surabaya
Referee: Wiwat Jumpao-on (Thailand)
21 July 2024
19:30

| Myanmar | 1–1 | Laos |
|---|---|---|
| Shine Wanna Aung 17' | Report | Phanthavong 82' |

Gelora 10 November Stadium, Surabaya
Referee: Abdul Hakim Mohd Haidi (Brunei Darussalam)

24 July 2024
15:00

| Laos | 1–4 | Vietnam |
|---|---|---|
| Phanthavong 27' | Report | Nguyễn Hoàng Anh 3'; Hoàng Quang Dũng 22'; Nguyễn Công Phương 77'; Phùng Văn Nam 83' |

Gelora Bung Tomo Stadium, Surabaya
Referee: Abdul Hakim Mohd Haidi (Brunei Darussalam)
24 July 2024
15:00

| Myanmar | 0–1 | Australia |
|---|---|---|
| | Report | Memeti 34' |

Gelora 10 November Stadium, Surabaya
Referee: Songkran Bunmeekiart (Thailand)

=== Group C ===
| Pos | Team | Pld | W | D | L | GF | GA | GD | Pts | Qualification |
|---|---|---|---|---|---|---|---|---|---|---|
| 1 | Malaysia | 3 | 2 | 1 | 0 | 17 | 1 | +16 | 7 | Knockout stage |
| 2 | Thailand | 3 | 2 | 1 | 0 | 9 | 2 | +7 | 7 | Knockout stage |
| 3 | Singapore | 3 | 1 | 0 | 2 | 3 | 7 | −4 | 3 | |
| 4 | Brunei | 3 | 0 | 0 | 3 | 0 | 19 | −19 | 0 | |

Rules for classification: Group stage tiebreakers
19 July 2024
15:00

| Malaysia | 11–0 | Brunei |
|---|---|---|
| Pavithran 2', 43'; Abid 14', 16', 81'; Danish 25'; Haykal 42'; Izzat 53' (pen.); Amir 67'; Zamirul 75'; Shafizan 83' | Report |

Gelora 10 November Stadium, Surabaya
Referee: Clifford Daypuyat (Philippines)
19 July 2024
19:30

| Thailand | 2–1 | Singapore |
|---|---|---|
| Phongsakorn 80'; Pikanet 86' | Report | Sahoo 26' |

Gelora 10 November Stadium, Surabaya
Referee: Thoriq Alkatiri (Indonesia)

22 July 2024
15:00

| Brunei | 0–6 | Thailand |
|---|---|---|
| | Report | Pakawat 8'; Paripan 27'; Ryan 45'; Pikanet 45+4'; Pitipong 79'; Rattapoom 90' |

Gelora 10 November Stadium, Surabaya
Referee: Ryan Nanda Saputra (Indonesia)
22 July 2024
19:30

| Singapore | 0–5 | Malaysia |
|---|---|---|
| | Report | Ridzwan 7'; Naim 12'; Pavithran 45+2'; Faris 73'; Izzat 82' |

Gelora 10 November Stadium, Surabaya
Referee: Ngô Duy Lân (Vietnam)

25 July 2024
15:00

| Malaysia | 1–1 | Thailand |
|---|---|---|
| Pavithran 48' (pen.) | Report | Ryan 4' |

Gelora Bung Tomo Stadium, Surabaya
Referee: Clifford Daypuyat (Philippines)
25 July 2024
15:00

| Singapore | 2–0 | Brunei |
|---|---|---|
| Sahoo 19', 40' (pen.) | Report |

Gelora 10 November Stadium, Surabaya
Referee: Ryan Nanda Saputra (Indonesia)

=== Ranking of runner-up teams ===
The best runner-up team from three groups advance to the Knockout stage.

| Pos | Grp | Team | Pld | W | D | L | GF | GA | GD | Pts | Qualification |
|---|---|---|---|---|---|---|---|---|---|---|---|
| 1 | C | Thailand | 3 | 2 | 1 | 0 | 9 | 2 | +7 | 7 | Knockout stage |
| 2 | B | Vietnam | 3 | 1 | 1 | 1 | 7 | 8 | −1 | 4 | |
| 3 | A | Cambodia | 3 | 1 | 0 | 2 | 3 | 5 | −2 | 3 | |

Rules for classification: 1) Points; 2) Goal difference; 3) Goals scored; 4) Drawing of lots.

== Knockout stage ==
In the knockout stage, the penalty shoot-out is used to decide the winner if necessary.

=== Bracket ===
Semi-finals
27 July 2024 – Surabaya
Australia | 0
Thailand | 1
27 July 2024 – Surabaya
Indonesia | 1
Malaysia | 0

Final
29 July 2024 – Surabaya
Thailand | 0
Indonesia | 1
Third place match
29 July 2024 – Surabaya
Australia (p) | 1 (5)
Malaysia | 1 (3)

=== Semi-finals ===
27 July 2024
15:00

| Australia | 0–1 | Thailand |
|---|---|---|
| | Report | Leonard 13' (o.g.) |

Gelora Bung Tomo Stadium, Surabaya
Referee: Razlan Joffri Ali (Malaysia)
27 July 2024
19:30

| Indonesia | 1–0 | Malaysia |
|---|---|---|
| Alfharezzi 78' | Report |

Gelora Bung Tomo Stadium, Surabaya
Referee: Yahya Ahmed Al Balushi (Oman)

=== Third place match ===
29 July 2024
15:00

| Australia | 1–1 | Malaysia |
|---|---|---|
| Younis 28' | Report | Najdovski 73' (o.g.) |
Penalties
| Memeti (penalty scored); Randazzo (penalty scored); Quintal (penalty scored); Bugarija (penalty scored); Helweh (penalty scored) | 5–3 | (penalty scored) Abid; (penalty scored) Pavithran; (penalty missed) Zachary; (penalty scored) Danish |

Gelora Bung Tomo Stadium, Surabaya
Referee: Ngô Duy Lân (Vietnam)

=== Final ===
29 July 2024
19:30

| Thailand | 0–1 | Indonesia |
|---|---|---|
| | Report | Raven 17' |

Gelora Bung Tomo Stadium, Surabaya
Referee: Faisal Sulaiman Al Balawi (Saudi Arabia)

== Winner ==
2024 ASEAN U-19 Boys Championship winners

Indonesia
Second title

== Awards ==
| Most Valuable Player | Top Scorer Award | Best Goalkeeper Award |
|---|---|---|
| (Indonesia) Dony Tri Pamungkas | (Australia) Jake Najdovski | (Indonesia) Ikram Algiffari |

== Goalscorers ==
There were 88 goals scored in 22 matches, for an average of 4 goals per match.

5 goals

- (Australia) Jake Najdovski

4 goals

- (Malaysia) G. Pavithran
- (Indonesia) Jens Raven

3 goals

- (Australia) Arion Sulemani
- (Australia) Marcus Younis
- (Indonesia) Iqbal Gwijangge
- (Indonesia) Kadek Arel
- (Malaysia) Abid Safaraz
- (Singapore) Sahoo Garv
- (Vietnam) Hoàng Quang Dũng

2 goals

- (Indonesia) Arlyansyah Abdulmanan
- (Laos) Peter Phanthavong
- (Malaysia) Izzat Syahir
- (Philippines) Otu Banatao
- (Thailand) Pikanet Laohawiwat
- (Thailand) Caelan Ryan
- (Timor-Leste) Alexandro Bahkito

1 goal

- (Australia) Zane Helweh
- (Australia) Medin Memeti
- (Australia) Luke Vickery
- (Cambodia) Chheang Kimsong
- (Cambodia) Sorm Borith
- (Cambodia) Eav Sovannara
- (Indonesia) Alfharezzi Buffon
- (Indonesia) Arkhan Kaka
- (Indonesia) Kafiatur Rizky
- (Malaysia) Amir Farhan
- (Malaysia) Danish Hakimi
- (Malaysia) Faris Danish Asrul
- (Malaysia) Haykal Danish
- (Malaysia) Naim Zainudin
- (Malaysia) Ridzwan Rosli
- (Malaysia) Shafizan Arshad
- (Malaysia) Zamirul Hakim
- (Myanmar) Phyo Pyae Sone
- (Myanmar) Shine Wanna Aung
- (Thailand) Pakawat Taengoakson
- (Thailand) Paripan Wongsa
- (Thailand) Phongsakorn Sangkasopha
- (Thailand) Pitipong Wongbut
- (Thailand) Rattapoom Pankejohn
- (Timor-Leste) Luís Figo
- (Timor-Leste) Ricardo Bianco
- (Timor-Leste) Vabio Canavaro
- (Vietnam) Nguyễn Bảo Long
- (Vietnam) Nguyễn Công Phương
- (Vietnam) Nguyễn Hoàng Anh
- (Vietnam) Phùng Văn Nam

1 own goal

- (Australia) Dylan Leonard (against Thailand)
- (Australia) Jake Najdovski (against Malaysia)
- (Timor-Leste) Alexandro Quintão (against Indonesia)

== Final ranking ==
| Pos | Team | Pld | W | D | L | GF | GA | GD | Pts | Final result |
|---|---|---|---|---|---|---|---|---|---|---|
| 1 | Indonesia (H) | 5 | 5 | 0 | 0 | 16 | 2 | +14 | 15 | Champion |
| 2 | Thailand | 5 | 3 | 1 | 1 | 10 | 3 | +7 | 10 | Runner up |
| 3 | Australia | 5 | 3 | 1 | 1 | 14 | 4 | +10 | 10 | Third place |
| 4 | Malaysia | 5 | 2 | 2 | 1 | 18 | 3 | +15 | 8 | Fourth place |
| 5 | Vietnam | 3 | 1 | 1 | 1 | 7 | 8 | −1 | 4 | Eliminated in group stage |
| 6 | Cambodia | 3 | 1 | 0 | 2 | 3 | 5 | −2 | 3 | Eliminated in group stage |
| 7 | Singapore | 3 | 1 | 0 | 2 | 3 | 7 | −4 | 3 | Eliminated in group stage |
| 8 | Timor-Leste | 3 | 1 | 0 | 2 | 5 | 10 | −5 | 3 | Eliminated in group stage |
| 9 | Philippines | 3 | 1 | 0 | 2 | 2 | 7 | −5 | 3 | Eliminated in group stage |
| 10 | Myanmar | 3 | 0 | 2 | 1 | 2 | 3 | −1 | 2 | Eliminated in group stage |
| 11 | Laos | 3 | 0 | 1 | 2 | 2 | 11 | −9 | 1 | Eliminated in group stage |
| 12 | Brunei | 3 | 0 | 0 | 3 | 0 | 19 | −19 | 0 | Eliminated in group stage |

Source: Group stage, Knockout stage
(H) Hosts

== Broadcasting rights ==
Broadcasters in Southeast Asia who acquired rights to the tournament include:

| Territory | Broadcaster(s) | Ref. |
|---|---|---|
| Cambodia | Hang Meas HDTV | |
| Indonesia | Indosiar; Moji; SCTV; Vidio.com | |
| Thailand | AIS Play | |

== See also ==
- 2024 ASEAN Championship
- 2024 ASEAN U-16 Boys Championship
