= ASEAN U-19 Boys' Championship =

Southeast Asian football tournament

- Organiser(s): AFF
- Founded: 2002
- Region: Southeast Asia
- Teams: 11 (2026)
- Current champions: Australia (6th title)
- Most championships: Australia (6 titles)
- Website: Official website
- 2026 ASEAN U-19 Boys Championship

The ASEAN U-19 Boys' Championship (formerly the AFF U-19 Youth Championship) is a biennal international football competition contested by the national teams of the members of the ASEAN Football Federation (AFF) and occasionally invited nations from the rest of Asia.

The tournament was previously played at under-20 level (except in 2003 when it was a special under-18 competition), however the AFF followed the lead of the Asian Football Confederation after they renamed its U-20 competition to fall in line with FIFA's naming conventions and also to reflect the age of the players at the competition. Thailand were the champions in the first ever edition in 2002.

== Summary ==
#	Year	Host	Final			Third place match
#	Year	Host	Champions	Score	Runners-up	Third place	Score	Fourth place
1	2002	Cambodia; Thailand	Thailand	4–0	Myanmar	Laos	2–1	Vietnam
2	2003	Myanmar; Vietnam	Myanmar	4–0	Malaysia	Singapore	1–1 (5–4 p)	Vietnam
3	2005	Indonesia	Myanmar	1–0	Malaysia	Laos	4–1	Vietnam
4	2006	Malaysia	Australia	RR	Malaysia	Thailand	RR	Vietnam
5	2007	Vietnam	Vietnam	1–0	Malaysia	Thailand	2–0	Myanmar
6	2008	Thailand	Australia	0–0 (3–1 p)	South Korea	China	3–0	Thailand
7	2009	Vietnam	Thailand	2–2 (5–3 p)	Australia	Vietnam	3–0	Malaysia
8	2010	Vietnam	Australia	1–0	Thailand	South Korea	1–1 (7–6 p)	Vietnam
9	2011	Myanmar	Thailand	1–1 (5–4 p)	Vietnam	Malaysia	0–0 (4–2 p)	Myanmar
10	2012	Vietnam	Iran	2–1	Uzbekistan	Australia	4–0	Vietnam
11	2013	Indonesia	Indonesia	0–0 (7–6 p)	Vietnam	Timor-Leste	4–2	Laos
12	2014	Vietnam	Japan	1–0	Vietnam	Thailand	1–0	Myanmar
13	2015	Laos	Thailand	6–0	Vietnam	Laos	1–1 (3–2 p)	Malaysia
14	2016	Vietnam	Australia	5–1	Thailand	Vietnam	4–0	Timor-Leste
15	2017	Myanmar	Thailand	2–0	Malaysia	Indonesia	7–1	Myanmar
16	2018	Indonesia	Malaysia	4–3	Myanmar	Indonesia	2–1	Thailand
17	2019	Vietnam	Australia	1–0	Malaysia	Indonesia	5–0	Myanmar
18	2022	Indonesia	Malaysia	2–0	Laos	Vietnam	1–1 (5–3 p)	Thailand
19	2024	Indonesia	Indonesia	1–0	Thailand	Australia	1–1 (5–3 p)	Malaysia
20	2026	Indonesia	Australia	2–0	Thailand	Indonesia	1–0	Cambodia

== Performance by countries ==
Team	Champions	Runners-up	Third Place	Fourth Place
Australia	6 (2006, 2008, 2010, 2016, 2019, 2026)	1 (2009)	2 (2012, 2024)	—
Thailand	5 (2002, 2009, 2011, 2015, 2017)	4 (2010, 2016, 2024, 2026)	3 (2006, 2007, 2014)	3 (2008, 2018, 2022)
Malaysia	2 (2018, 2022)	6 (2003, 2005, 2006, 2007, 2017, 2019)	1 (2011)	3 (2009, 2015, 2024)
Myanmar	2 (2003, 2005)	2 (2002, 2018)	—	5 (2007, 2011, 2014, 2017, 2019)
Indonesia	2 (2013, 2024)	—	4 (2017, 2018, 2019, 2026)	—
Vietnam	1 (2007)	4 (2011, 2013, 2014, 2015)	3 (2009, 2016, 2022)	6 (2002, 2003, 2005, 2006, 2010, 2012)
Iran	1 (2012)	—	—	—
Japan	1 (2014)	—	—	—
Laos	—	1 (2022)	3 (2002, 2005, 2015)	1 (2013)
South Korea	—	1 (2008)	1 (2010)	—
Uzbekistan	—	1 (2012)	—	—
Timor-Leste	—	—	1 (2013)	1 (2016)
Singapore	—	—	1 (2003)	—
China	—	—	1 (2008)	—
Cambodia	—	—	—	1 (2026)

== Participating nations ==
Team	(Cambodia) (Thailand) 2002 (10)	(Myanmar) (Vietnam) 2003 (9)	(Indonesia) 2005 (10)	(Malaysia) 2006 (4)	(Vietnam) 2007 (8)	(Thailand) 2008 (4)	(Vietnam) 2009 (8)	(Vietnam) 2010 (4)	(Myanmar) 2011 (10)	(Vietnam) 2012 (4)	(Indonesia) 2013 (11)	(Vietnam) 2014 (6)	(Laos) 2015 (10)	(Vietnam) 2016 (11)	(Myanmar) 2017 (11)	(Indonesia) 2018 (11)	(Vietnam) 2019 (12)	(Indonesia) 2022 (11)	(Indonesia) 2024 (12)	(Indonesia) 2026 (11)	Total
Australia	×	×	×	1st	×	1st	2nd	1st	×	3rd	×	GS	×	1st	×	×	1st	×	3rd	1st	9
Brunei	GS	×	GS	×	GS	×	×	×	GS	×	GS	×	GS	×	GS	GS	GS	GS	GS	GS	11
Cambodia	GS	GS	×	×	GS	×	GS	×	GS	×	GS	×	GS	GS	GS	GS	GS	GS	GS	4th	13
Indonesia	GS	GS	GS	×	×	×	×	×	GS	×	1st	GS	×	GS	3rd	3rd	3rd	GS	1st	3rd	12
Laos	3rd	GS	3rd	×	GS	×	×	×	GS	×	4th	×	3rd	GS	GS	GS	GS	2nd	GS	×	13
Malaysia	GS	2nd	2nd	2nd	2nd	×	4th	×	3rd	×	GS	×	4th	GS	2nd	1st	2nd	1st	4th	GS	15
Myanmar	2nd	1st	1st	×	4th	×	GS	×	4th	×	GS	4th	GS	GS	4th	2nd	4th	GS	GS	GS	15
Philippines	GS	GS	×	×	×	×	×	×	GS	×	GS	×	GS	GS	GS	GS	GS	GS	GS	GS	11
Singapore	GS	3rd	GS	×	GS	×	GS	×	GS	×	GS	×	GS	GS	GS	GS	GS	GS	GS	GS	14
Thailand	1st	GS	GS	3rd	3rd	4th	1st	2nd	1st	×	GS	3rd	1st	2nd	1st	4th	GS	4th	2nd	2nd	18
Timor-Leste	×	×	GS	×	×	×	GS	×	×	×	3rd	×	GS	4th	GS	GS	GS	GS	GS	GS	10
Vietnam	4th	4th	4th	4th	1st	×	3rd	4th	2nd	4th	2nd	2nd	2nd	3rd	GS	GS	GS	3rd	GS	GS	18
Invitees nations
China	×	×	×	×	×	3rd	×	×	×	×	×	×	×	×	×	×	×	×	×	×	1
Iran	×	×	×	×	×	×	×	×	×	1st	×	×	×	×	×	×	×	×	×	×	1
Japan	×	×	×	×	×	×	×	×	×	×	×	1st	×	×	×	×	×	×	×	×	1
Maldives	×	×	GS	×	×	×	×	×	×	×	×	×	×	×	×	×	×	×	×	×	1
South Korea	×	×	×	×	×	2nd	×	3rd	×	×	×	×	×	×	×	×	×	×	×	×	2
Uzbekistan	×	×	×	×	×	×	×	×	×	2nd	×	×	×	×	×	×	×	×	×	×	1

Legend

- 1st — Champions
- 2nd — Runners-up
- 3rd — Third place
- 4th — Fourth place
- GS — Group stage
- q — Qualified for the current tournament
- × — Did not enter / Withdrew / Banned
- — Hosts

== Awards ==
Tournaments	Top Scorers	Goals	Best Player	Best Goalkeeper	Fair Play Award
2002 Cambodia/Thailand	Unknown		Not Awarded	Not Awarded	Not Awarded
2003 Myanmar/Vietnam	(Malaysia) Norshahrul Idlan Talaha	7	Not Awarded	Not Awarded	Not Awarded
2005 Indonesia	(Malaysia) Zaquan Adha	8	Not Awarded	Not Awarded	Not Awarded
2005 Indonesia	(Malaysia) Shafiq Jamal	8	Not Awarded	Not Awarded	Not Awarded
2006 Malaysia	(Malaysia) Abdul Manaf Mamat	3	Not Awarded	Not Awarded	Not Awarded
2007 Vietnam	(Thailand) Kraikitti In-utane	5	Not Awarded	Not Awarded	Not Awarded
2008 Thailand	(Thailand) Nirunrit Jaroensuk	3	Not Awarded	Not Awarded	Thailand
2009 Vietnam	(Malaysia) Thamil Arasu Ambumamee	5	Not Awarded	Not Awarded	Not Awarded
2010 Vietnam	(Vietnam) Nguyễn Văn Thạnh	3	Not Awarded	Not Awarded	South Korea
2011 Myanmar	(Vietnam) Nguyễn Xuân Nam	8	Not Awarded	Not Awarded	Not Awarded
2012 Vietnam	(Iran) Alireza Jahanbakhsh (Iran) Sardar Azmoun	4	Not Awarded	Not Awarded	Not Awarded
2013 Indonesia	(Vietnam) Nguyễn Văn Toàn	6	Not Awarded	Not Awarded	Not Awarded
2014 Vietnam	(Japan) Masaya Okugawa (Thailand) Sittichok Kannoo	3	Not Awarded	Not Awarded	Not Awarded
2015 Laos	(Thailand) Worachit Kanitsribampen	6	Not Awarded	Not Awarded	Not Awarded
2016 Vietnam	(Australia) George Blackwood	6	Not Awarded	Not Awarded	Not Awarded
2017 Myanmar	(Indonesia) Egy Maulana Vikri	8	(Indonesia) Egy Maulana Vikri	Not Awarded	Thailand
2018 Indonesia	(Myanmar) Win Naing Tun	7	Not Awarded	Not Awarded	Not Awarded
2019 Vietnam	(Australia) Dylan Ruiz-Diaz (Indonesia) Bagus Kahfi (Timor-Leste) Mouzinho	6	Not Awarded	Not Awarded	Myanmar
2022 Indonesia	(Vietnam) Nguyễn Quốc Việt	5	(Malaysia) Ahmad Aysar Hadi	(Laos) Phounin Xayyasone	Not Awarded
2024 Indonesia	(Australia) Jake Najdovski	5	(Indonesia) Dony Tri Pamungkas	(Indonesia) Ikram Algiffari	Not Awarded
2026 Indonesia	(Australia) Medin Memeti	5	(Australia) Alexander Garbowski	(Indonesia) Dafa Setiawarman	Not Awarded

== All-time ranking table ==
As of 2026 tournament

Rank	Team	Part	Pld	W	D	L	GF	GA	GD	Pts	Best finish
1	Thailand	19	98	56	18	24	237	99	+138	186	Champions (2002, 2009, 2011, 2015, 2017)
2	Vietnam	19	95	49	21	25	220	117	+103	168	Champions (2007)
3	Malaysia	16	79	43	15	21	182	97	+85	144	Champions (2018, 2022)
4	Myanmar	16	79	39	13	27	163	114	+49	130	Champions (2003, 2005)
5	Indonesia	13	65	37	10	18	173	86	+87	121	Champions (2013, 2024)
6	Australia	10	42	28	6	8	109	42	+67	90	Champions (2006, 2008, 2010, 2016, 2019, 2026)
7	Laos	13	63	26	6	31	109	120	–11	84	Runners-up (2022)
8	Singapore	15	60	14	12	34	60	129	–69	54	Third place (2003)
9	Timor-Leste	11	46	15	7	25	70	105	–35	52	Third place (2013)
10	Cambodia	14	56	15	6	35	72	127	–55	51	Fourth place (2026)
11	Philippines	13	48	6	1	41	44	175	–131	19	Group stage (12 times)
12	Iran	1	4	4	0	0	10	4	+6	12	Champions (2012)
13	Japan	1	4	4	0	0	10	6	+4	12	Champions (2014)
14	South Korea	2	8	2	4	1	4	3	+1	10	Runners-up (2008)
15	Brunei	12	48	3	1	44	18	250	–232	10	Group stage (12 times)
16	Uzbekistan	1	4	2	0	2	8	5	+3	6	Runners-up (2012)
17	China	1	4	1	0	4	4	7	–3	3	Third place (2008)
18	Maldives	1	4	0	1	3	3	10	–3	1	Group stage (1 time)

== See also ==
- AFC U-20 Asian Cup
- ASEAN Football Federation
