= 2025 ASEAN U-23 Championship final =

- Gelora Bung Karno Stadium in Jakarta hosted the final.
- Event: 2025 ASEAN U-23 Championship
| Vietnam | Indonesia |
| (Vietnam) | (Indonesia) |
| 1 | 0 |
- Date: 29 July 2025
- Venue: Gelora Bung Karno Stadium, Jakarta
- Man of the Match: Nguyễn Đình Bắc (Vietnam)
- Referee: Koji Takasaki (Japan)
- Attendance: 35,592
- Weather: Partly cloudy 29 °C (84 °F); 78% humidity

The 2025 ASEAN U-23 Championship final was a football match that took place on 29 July 2025 at Gelora Bung Karno Stadium in Jakarta, Indonesia, to determine the winners of the 2025 ASEAN U-23 Championship. The match was contested by defending champions Vietnam and Indonesia, which repeated the 2023 final in Rayong, Thailand.

Vietnam won the match 1–0 after for their third consecutive ASEAN U-23 Championship and their third title overall. Nguyễn Công Phương scored to put Vietnam's lead in the final until full time.

Nguyễn Đình Bắc was named player of the match in the aftermath, with the game having attended by ASEAN Football Federation (AFF) president Khiev Sameth, Vietnam Football Federation (VFF) president Trần Quốc Tuấn and Football Association of Indonesia (PSSI) president Eric Thohir.

== Route to the final ==
=== Vietnam ===
Vietnam's route to the final
| Match | Opponent | Result |
|---|---|---|
| 1 | Laos | 0–3 |
| 2 | Cambodia | 2–1 |
| SF | Philippines | 2–1 |

In the final tournament as a defending champions, they were drawn in Group B. Their opening match was against Laos at Patriot Chandrabhaga Stadium in Bekasi on 19 July. Vietnam won the game 0–3 with Khuất Văn Khang scoring the side's first goal of the tournament, then two goals later from half-time by Nguyễn Hiểu Minh. Vietnam's second and final group game was against Cambodia at Gelora Bung Karno Stadium, with the team having a 2–1 win with Phạm Lý Đức scored to give Vietnam's 1–0 half time lead. In the second half, Mon Rado equalised a 1–1 tie until Nguyễn Đình Bắc doubled for the final result. Vietnam advanced through the knockout stage by finishing first in the group.

Vietnam faced Philippines in the semi-finals, in the first half, they firstly got a lead from Javier Mariona in the 36th minute until Nguyễn Đình Bắc equalised it in the 41st minute, Nguyễn Xuân Bắc also doubled in the second half, as Vietnam booked their place in the final for the third consecutive time since 2022.

=== Indonesia ===
Indonesia's route to the final
| Match | Opponent | Result |
|---|---|---|
| 1 | Brunei | 8–0 |
| 2 | Philippines | 0–1 |
| 3 | Malaysia | 0–0 |
| SF | Thailand | 1–1 (a.e.t.) (7–6 p) |

The tournament hosts, Indonesia, was drawn in Group A. Indonesia first started their opening match with a large 8–0 win from Brunei with 6 goals from Jens Raven leading him first from goalscorers list. Under their first group stage win, Indonesia later won Philippines, despite Rosquillo's own goal on the 23rd minute. Indonesia's final group stage match was against Malaysia on 21 July at Gelora Bung Karno Stadium, and finished as a scoreless draw. Despite finishing in the scoreless draw, Indonesia advanced through the knockout stage by finishing first in the group.

In a semi-final match against Thailand, it is the rematch from the final match in 2023 SEA Games. It saw Thailand's lead succumbed by one goal from Yotsakorn Burapha, but successfully equalised into one late goal by Jens Raven from the 84th minute as regulation time ended 1–1 after 90 minutes; neither could find the breakthrough in extra time and penalties were used to decide the winner. Muhammad Ardiansyah saved two Thai penalties from Pichitchai Sienkrathok and Yotsakorn Burapha missed the last kick of the game, while Robi Darwis only missed for Indonesia. Indonesia reached their second consecutive ASEAN U-23 Championship final.

== Match details ==
29 July 2025
20:00

| Vietnam | 1–0 | Indonesia |
|---|---|---|
| Nguyễn Công Phương 37' | Report |

Gelora Bung Karno Stadium, Jakarta
Attendance: 35,592
Referee: Koji Takasaki (Japan)

| Vietnam | Indonesia |

| GK | 1 | Trần Trung Kiên | (yellow card) 90+5' |
| CB | 3 | Phạm Lý Đức | (yellow card) 32' |
| CB | 4 | Nguyễn Hiểu Minh |
| CB | 16 | Nguyễn Nhật Minh |
| RM | 20 | Võ Anh Quân | (yellow card) 54' |
| CM | 12 | Nguyễn Xuân Bắc | | (substituted off) 82' |
| CM | 8 | Nguyễn Văn Trường |
| LM | 17 | Nguyễn Phi Hoàng |
| AM | 11 | Khuất Văn Khang (c) | | (substituted off) 69' |
| CF | 18 | Nguyễn Công Phương | | (substituted off) 68' |
| CF | 7 | Nguyễn Đình Bắc | | (substituted off) 90+2' |
Substitutions:
| DF | 2 | Lê Văn Hà | | (substituted on) 90+2' |
| MF | 6 | Nguyễn Thái Sơn | (yellow card) 86' | (substituted on) 82' |
| MF | 14 | Viktor Le | | (substituted on) 69' |
| FW | 22 | Lê Văn Thuận | | (substituted on) 68' |
Manager:
| (South Korea) Kim Sang-sik | | | (yellow card) 90+9' |

| GK | 1 | Muhammad Ardiansyah |
| CB | 3 | Kakang Rudianto |
| CB | 2 | Muhammad Ferarri |
| CB | 4 | Kadek Arel (c) | (yellow card) 14' |
| RWB | 11 | Rahmat Arjuna | | (substituted off) 86' |
| LWB | 19 | Frengky Missa | | (substituted off) 60' |
| DM | 6 | Robi Darwis |
| RM | 8 | Rayhan Hannan | (yellow card) 11' |
| CM | 20 | Dominikus Dion | | (substituted off) 81' |
| LM | 5 | Dony Tri Pamungkas |
| CF | 21 | Jens Raven |
Substitutions:
| DF | 20 | Achmad Maulana | | (substituted on) 60' |
| MF | 10 | Arkhan Fikri | | (substituted on) 81' |
| FW | 12 | Hokky Caraka | | (substituted on) 86' |
Other disciplinary actions:
| TS | — | (South Africa) Damian van Rensburg | Sent off (straight red) |
Manager:
(Netherlands) Gerald Vanenburg

Player of the Match:
Nguyễn Đình Bắc (Vietnam)

Assistant referees:
Abdul Hannan (Singapore)
Tomoyuki Umeda (Japan)
Fourth official:
Mohammed Sami (Saudi Arabia)
Video assistant referee:
Muhammad Taqi (Singapore)
Assistant video assistant referee:
Pansa Chaisanit (Thailand)

Match rules

- 90 minutes.
- 30 minutes of extra time if necessary.
- Penalty shoot-out if scores still level.
- Maximum of twelve named substitutes.
- Maximum of five substitutions, with a sixth allowed in extra time. (Note: Each team was given only three opportunities to make substitutions, with a fourth opportunity in extra time, excluding substitutions made at half-time, before the start of extra time and at half-time in extra time.)

=== Statistics ===
Team-to-team comparision
| Statistic | Vietnam | Indonesia |
|---|---|---|
| Goals scored | 1 | 0 |
| Shots | 6 | 6 |
| Shots on target | 2 | 2 |
| Shots off target | 4 | 4 |
| Total passes | 185 | 441 |
| Ball possession | 32% | 68% |
| Corners | 3 | 3 |
| Fouls | 9 | 11 |
| Offsides | 2 | 1 |
| Yellow cards | 4 | 2 |
| Red cards | 0 | 0 |

== Post-match ==
=== Records ===
Many records were set that day for Vietnam (who became the first three-time consecutive ASEAN U-23 champions), head coach Kim Sang-sik (the first Vietnam national team coach to conquer both this title and the senior-level ASEAN Championship in the same year) and the whole tournament alike (with an all-time record attendance of 35,592 at Gelora Bung Karno).

Viewed live by over 9 million people in Vietnam alone on the FPT Bóng Đá Việt YouTube channel, the final is also Vietnamese television's third most-watched single programme in 2025 so far.

=== Street storming ===
Just after the match ended, street storming lasted throughout the night of 29 July in Hanoi, Ho Chi Minh City, Huế and other cities. A notable case involved a 91-year-old woman named Đỗ Thị Sen, who took to the streets of Haiphong with her family.

=== Triumphant return to Vietnam ===
The Vietnam team were congratulated in messages by Prime Minister Phạm Minh Chính. They flew from Jakarta to Hanoi on the night of 30 July, the plane was expected to arrive at Nội Bài International Airport at 22:05 local time (UTC+7); after the flight plans were announced. Their plane flew with Vietnam Airlines, was expected to land on Ho Chi Minh City at 17:05 local time. The winning team arrived to Soekarno–Hatta International Airport at 13:50 local time (UTC+7). At 18:15, the teams arrived at Tân Sơn Nhất International Airport on Ho Chi Minh City, having 1 hour 10 minutes late from expected arrival At 23:30, the teams arrived at Hanoi on Nội Bài International Airport, having 1 hour 25 minutes late than expected arrival, ending their journey of the tournament.
