= Daffa Fasya =

Indonesian footballer (born 2004)

Personal information
- Full name: Daffa Fasya Sumawijaya
- Date of birth: 7 May 2004 (age 22)
- Place of birth: Majalengka, Indonesia
- Height: 1.85 m (6 ft 1 in)
- Position: Goalkeeper

Team information
- Current team: Garudayaksa
- Number: 14

Youth career
- SSB Asag Biha
- 2021–2023: Borneo Samarinda
- 2021–2022: Garuda Select

Senior career*
Years	Team	Apps	(Gls)
2023–2026	Borneo Samarinda	3	(0)
2026–	Garudayaksa	0	(0)

International career^{‡}
2022–2023	Indonesia U20	6	(0)
2025–	Indonesia U23	3	(0)
2024–	Indonesia	1	(0)
Medal record
Men's football
Representing Indonesia
ASEAN U-23 Championship
Runner-up	2023 Thailand	Team
Runner-up	2025 Indonesia	Team
- * Club domestic league appearances and goals as of 23 May 2025 ‡ National team caps and goals as of 12 December 2025

Daffa Fasya Sumawijaya (born 7 May 2004) is an Indonesian professional footballer who plays as a goalkeeper for Super League club Garudayaksa and the Indonesia national team.

== Club career ==
=== Borneo Samarinda ===
He was signed for Borneo Samarinda to play in Liga 1 in the 2022–23 season. Daffa made his first-team debut on 13 April 2023 in a match against RANS Nusantara at the Segiri Stadium, Samarinda.

== International career ==
In January 2023, Daffa was called up by Shin Tae-Yong to the Indonesia under-20 team for the training centre in preparation for 2023 AFC U-20 Asian Cup. On 17 January 2023, Daffa made his debut for the team against Fiji under-20 in a 4–0 win.

In March 2023, Daffa Fasya was called up by Indonesian manager Shin Tae-yong for two friendly matches against Burundi.

On 25 November 2024, Daffa received a called up to the preliminary squad to the Indonesia national team for the 2024 ASEAN Championship.

== Career statistics ==
=== International ===
As of match played 12 December 2024

Appearances and goals by national team and year
National team	Year	Apps	Goals
Indonesia	2024	1	0
Total		1	0

== Honours ==
Indonesia U23

- AFF U-23 Championship runner-up: 2023, 2025
