= Nguyễn Công Phương =

Vietnamese footballer

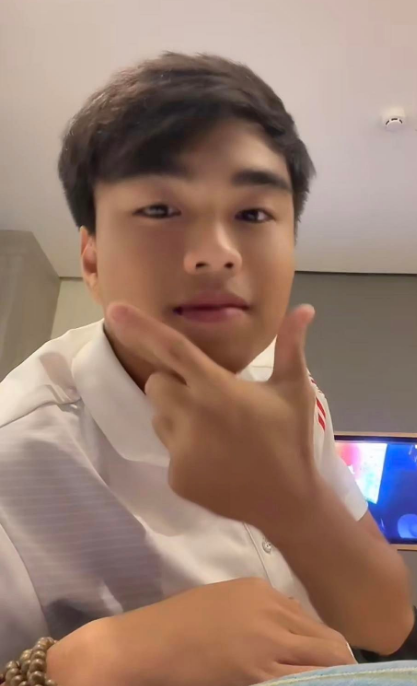
- Công Phương in 2024

Personal information
- Full name: Nguyễn Công Phương
- Date of birth: 3 June 2006 (age 20)
- Place of birth: Hải Dương, Vietnam
- Height: 1.78 m (5 ft 10 in)
- Position: Midfielder

Team information
- Current team: Hải Phòng (on loan from Thể Công–Viettel)

Youth career
- 2015–2018: Hải Dương
- 2018–2023: Viettel

Senior career*
Years	Team	Apps	(Gls)
2023–2026	Thể Công–Viettel	25	(0)
2026–	→ Hải Phòng (loan)	0	(0)

International career^{‡}
2022–2023	Vietnam U17	11	(4)
2024–2025	Vietnam U20	10	(5)
2025–	Vietnam U23	15	(1)
Medal record
Men's football
Representing Vietnam
AFC U-23 Asian Cup
Third place	Saudi Arabia 2026
ASEAN U-23 Championship
Winner	Indonesia 2025
SEA Games
Gold medal – first place	Bangkok 2025
AFF U-16 Youth Championship
Runner-up	Indonesia 2022
- * Club domestic league appearances and goals as of 7 June 2026 ‡ National team caps and goals as of 28 March 2026

Nguyễn Công Phương (born 3 June 2006) is a Vietnamese professional footballer who plays as a midfielder for V.League 1 club Hải Phòng, on loan from Thể Công-Viettel.

== Early career ==
Born in Hải Dương, Công Phương started playing football at an early age. At the age of 9, Công Phương joined the Hải Dương football center after his primary teacher's recommendation. At Hải Dương, Công Phương played as a center back and helped his team finish runner-up in the Vietnamese National U-11 Championship in 2016 and 2017. In 2018, Công Phương joined the Viettel FC youth academy.

In 2023, as the captain of Viettel U-19, Công Phương scored 4 goals in the Vietnamese National U-17 Championship, including one in the final, to help his team win the tournament. He was given the "Player of the tournament" and the "Top scorer" award.

== Club career ==
On 18 May 2024, Công Phương made his professional debut with Thể Công-Viettel, coming in as a substitute in the V.League 1 game against Nam Định. In the 90th minute of the game, he delivered a cross that lead to Trần Danh Trung's goal as Thể Công-Viettel won 2–1.

In July 2026, Công Phương was loaned to Hải Phòng.

== International career ==
In March 2022, Công Phương was included in Vietnam U17 19-men squad for a training camp in Germany, where they played friendlies against youth teams of German professional clubs. Later in the year, Công Phương was selected Vietnam U16 squad to participate in the AFF U-16 Youth Championship. He was named as the team captain and scored two goals during the tournament as Vietnam finished as runner-up after losing to Indonesia in the final.

In February 2023, Công Phương was called up to the Vietnam U20 team for the 2023 AFC U-20 Asian Cup but refused to join the team to concentrate on the Vietnamese National U-17 Championship with his club. Later in year, Công Phương took part in the 2023 AFC U-17 Asian Cup as the Vietnam U17's captain. He started in all three group stage games but displayed a disappointed performance as his team failed to win a game.

In August 2023, Công Phương received his first call-up to the Vietnam U23 side top prepare for the 2023 AFF U-23 Championship but was not included in the final squad. A month after, he was included in the preliminary squad for the 2022 Asian Games but didn't make into the final list.

Công Phương made his debut with Vietnam U23 in the 2025 ASEAN U-23 Championship. He featured in every game, starting in the semi-final and then in the final against host Indonesia, where he scored the only goal of the game to help Vietnam won the tournament.

== Playing style ==
Công Phương is notable for his ability to control and coordinate the ball as well as for keeping tempo in the midfield. Mainly operating as a central midfielder, he has made many breakthroughs when playing; he oftentimes anchors the midfield or lines up behind a striker to cause chaos in the opponent's penalty area. As a result, he has been named as one of the most talented Vietnamese footballers in his generation.

== Career statistics ==
As of match played 7 June 2026

Appearances and goals by club, season and competition
Club	Season	League			National cup		Continental		Other		Total	
Club	Season	Division	Apps	Goals	Apps	Goals	Apps	Goals	Apps	Goals	Apps	Goals
Thể Công-Viettel	2023–24	V.League 1	5	0	1	0	—		—		6	0
Thể Công-Viettel	2024–25	V.League 1	16	0	1	0	—		—		17	0
Thể Công-Viettel	2025–26	V.League 1	4	0	1	0	—		—		5	0
Career total			25	0	3	0	0	0	0	0	28	0

== Honours ==
Vietnam U16

- AFF U-16 Youth Championship runner-up: 2022

Vietnam U23

- ASEAN U-23 Championship: 2025
- SEA Games gold medal: 2025
- AFC U-23 Asian Cup third place: 2026

Individual

- Vietnamese National U-17 Football Championship best player: 2023
- Vietnamese National U-17 Football Championship top scorer: 2023
