= Dominikus Dion =

Indonesian association football player

Personal information
- Full name: Dominikus Dion Oktawian Wibowo
- Date of birth: 14 October 2004 (age 22)
- Place of birth: Sleman, Indonesia
- Height: 1.66 m (5 ft 5 in)
- Position: Midfielder

Team information
- Current team: PSS Sleman
- Number: 76

Youth career
- 2019–2023: PSS Sleman

Senior career*
Years	Team	Apps	(Gls)
2023–	PSS Sleman	64	(5)
2023–2024	→ Persipa Pati (loan)	10	(1)

International career^{‡}
2025	Indonesia U23	4	(0)
Medal record
Men's football
Representing Indonesia
ASEAN U-23 Championship
Runner-up	2025 Indonesia	Team
- * Club domestic league appearances and goals as of 4 September 2026 ‡ National team caps and goals as of 12 May 2026

Dominikus Dion Oktawian Wibowo (born 14 October 2004) is an Indonesian professional footballer who plays as a midfielder for Liga 2 club PSS Sleman.

== Club career ==
=== Persipa Pati ===
Dion was loaned to Liga 2 club Persipa Pati for the 2023–24 season. This experience shaped him into a more mature player before returning to PSS Sleman.

=== PSS Sleman ===
Dion won a place in the PSS Sleman squad for the 2024–25 BRI Liga 1 season. He made his debut against Semen Padang FC on 26 August 2024.

== Honours ==
PSS Sleman

- Championship runner up: 2025–26

Indonesia U23

- ASEAN U-23 Championship runner-up: 2025
