= Yardan Yafi =

Indonesian footballer

Personal information
- Full name: Yardan Yafi
- Date of birth: 15 January 2004 (age 22)
- Place of birth: Tangerang, Indonesia
- Height: 1.64 m (5 ft 5 in)
- Position: Winger

Team information
- Current team: Persita Tangerang
- Number: 46

Youth career
- 2019: SSB Benteng Muda IFA
- 2021–2024: Persita Tangerang U20

Senior career*
Years	Team	Apps	(Gls)
2023–	Persita Tangerang	29	(2)

International career^{‡}
2025	Indonesia U23	2	(0)
Medal record
Men's football
Representing Indonesia
ASEAN U-23 Championship
Runner-up	2025 Indonesia	Team
- * Club domestic league appearances and goals as of 23 May 2025 (UTC) ‡ National team caps and goals as of 25 July 2025

Yardan Yafi (born 15 January 2004) is an Indonesian professional footballer who plays as a winger for Indonesian Super League club Persita Tangerang.

== Club career ==
=== Persita Tangerang ===
Yafi is one of the young players promoted from the Persita U20. Although he has been promoted to the first team, he will continue to play with the U20 team for the 2023–24 season, he is one of four Persita U20 players included in the Best XI EPA Liga 1 U20. On 11 August 2024, Yafi made his professional league debut for Persita in a 0–1 away win over PSIS Semarang at Moch. Soebroto Stadium. On 29 December 2024, Yafi scored his first league goal for the team in a 1–1 draw over PSM Makassar at Pakansari Stadium.

== Career statistics ==
=== Club ===
As of 23 May 2025

Club	Season	League		Cup		Continental		Other		Total	
Club	Season	Apps	Goals	Apps	Goals	Apps	Goals	Apps	Goals	Apps	Goals
Persita Tangerang	2023–24	0	0	0	0	–		0	0	0	0
Persita Tangerang	2024–25	29	2	0	0	–		0	0	29	2
Persita Tangerang	2025–26	0	0	0	0	–		0	0	0	0
Career total		29	2	0	0	0	0	0	0	29	2

== Honours ==
Indonesia U23

- ASEAN U-23 Championship runner-up: 2025
