= 2018 Hassanal Bolkiah Trophy =

Tournament details
- Host country: Brunei
- Dates: 23 April – 5 May 2018
- Teams: 7
- Venues: 2 (in 1 host city)

Final positions
- Champions: Timor-Leste (1st title)
- Runners-up: Cambodia
- Third place: Myanmar; Singapore (shared)

Tournament statistics
- Matches played: 12
- Goals scored: 28 (2.33 per match)
- Top scorer(s): (Laos) Phithack Kongmathilath (Singapore) Ikhsan Fandi (3 goals each)

The 2018 Hassanal Bolkiah Trophy is the sixth edition of the invitational tournament hosted by Brunei, taking place from 23 April to 5 May. A total of 7 teams of the under-22 age group from the Southeast Asian region will be competing for the trophy along with a cash prize of B$20,000 (US$15,200) for the winners, B$10,000 (US$7,600) for the runner-up and B$5,000 (US$3,800) for joint third-place.

Teams were divided into two groups, with the host nation able to choose which group to be placed in. The draw took place on 21 March with Brunei electing to choose Group A. Indonesia could not join due to the 2018 PSSI Anniversary Cup, while Malaysia, Philippines and Vietnam are not participating due to tight football league schedules in their countries.

Timor-Leste emerged as the champion after beating Cambodia by 1–0 in the final, while both Myanmar and Singapore shared the third place.

== Venues ==
Hassanal Bolkiah National Stadium	Track & Field Sports Complex
4°55′44″N 114°56′42″E	4.9312280°N 114.9470584°E
Capacity: 28,000	Capacity: 1,700

== Match officials ==
The following referees were chosen for the tournament.

Referees

- (Brunei) Amidillah Zainuddin
- (Iran) Payam Heidari
- (Jordan) Ahmad Yaqoub Ibrahim
- (Kyrgyzstan) Dmitry Mashentsev
- (Malaysia) Suhaizi Shukri
- (Thailand) Mongkolchai Pechsri

== Group stage ==
=== Group A ===
Pos	Team	Pld	W	D	L	GF	GA	GD	Pts	Qualification
1	Myanmar	3	2	1	0	4	1	+3	7	Semi-finals
2	Timor-Leste	3	1	1	1	2	3	−1	4	Semi-finals
3	Brunei (H)	3	1	0	2	2	3	−1	3	
4	Thailand	3	0	2	1	3	4	−1	2	

Updated to match(es) played on 30 April 2018. Source: Hassanal Bolkiah Trophy
Rules for classification: 1) Points; 2) Goal difference; 3) Goals scored
(H) Hosts
23 April
21:00

Brunei	0–1	Timor-Leste
	Report	José Oliveira 20' (pen.)

Hassanal Bolkiah National Stadium, BSB
Attendance: 27,152
Referee: Ahmad Yaqoub Ibrahim (Jordan)

24 April
20:15

Myanmar	1–1	Thailand
Hein Htet Aung 66'	Report	Sirimongkol 90+2'

Track & Field Sports Complex, BSB
Attendance: 1,640
Referee: Dmitry Mashentsev (Kyrgyzstan)

27 April
20:15

Brunei	2–1	Thailand
Naziruddin 71'; Yura 90+1'	Report	Sittichok 77'

Hassanal Bolkiah National Stadium, BSB
Attendance: 25,616
Referee: Suhaizi Shukri (Malaysia)

27 April
20:15

Timor-Leste	0–2	Myanmar
	Report	Win Naing Tun 27'; Hein Htet Aung 90+2'

Track & Field Sports Complex, BSB
Attendance: 850
Referee: Payam Heidari (Iran)

29 April
20:15

Thailand	1–1	Timor-Leste
Phithak 3'	Report	Rufino Gama 90+9'

Hassanal Bolkiah National Stadium, BSB
Attendance: 2,927
Referee: Ahmad Yaqoub Ibrahim (Jordan)

30 April
21:00

Brunei	0–1	Myanmar
	Report	Zin Min Tun 35'

Hassanal Bolkiah National Stadium, BSB
Attendance: 26,600
Referee: Dmitry Mashentsev (Kyrgyzstan)

=== Group B ===
Pos	Team	Pld	W	D	L	GF	GA	GD	Pts	Qualification
1	Singapore	2	1	0	1	5	2	+3	3	Semi-finals
2	Cambodia	2	1	0	1	2	2	0	3	Semi-finals
3	Laos	2	1	0	1	3	6	−3	3	

Updated to match(es) played on 30 April 2018. Source: Hassanal Bolkiah Trophy
Rules for classification: 1) Points; 2) Goal difference; 3) Goals scored
25 April
20:15

Laos	1–5	Singapore
Phithack 20'	Report	Rusyaidi 18', 90+2'; Hami 40'; Ikhsan 45', 49'

Hassanal Bolkiah National Stadium, BSB
Attendance: 3,748
Referee: Amidillah Zainuddin (Brunei)

28 April
20:15

Cambodia	1–2	Laos
Suhana 15'	Report	Phithack 69', 90+3'

Hassanal Bolkiah National Stadium, BSB
Attendance: 3,600
Referee: Mongkolchai Pechsri (Thailand)

30 April
21:00

Singapore	0–1	Cambodia
	Report	Suhana 23'

Track & Field Sports Complex, BSB
Attendance: 350
Referee: Suhaizi Shukri (Malaysia)

== Knockout stage ==
Semi-finals
2 May – BSB
Myanmar	1
Cambodia	2
2 May – BSB
Singapore	1
Timor-Leste	2

Final
5 May – BSB
Cambodia	0
Timor-Leste	1

=== Semi-finals ===
2 May
20:15

Myanmar	1–2	Cambodia
Visal 40' (o.g.)	Report	N. Kakada 13', 32'

Hassanal Bolkiah National Stadium, BSB
Attendance: 2,226
Referee: Payam Heidari (Iran)
2 May
20:15

Singapore	1–2	Timor-Leste
Ikhsan 34'	Report	Rufino Gama 76'; Henrique Cruz 78'

Track & Field Sports Complex, BSB
Attendance: 602
Referee: Dmitry Mashentsev (Kyrgyzstan)

=== Final ===
5 May
20:30

Cambodia	0–1	Timor-Leste
	Report	Henrique Cruz 51'

Hassanal Bolkiah National Stadium, BSB
Attendance: 20,270
Referee: Ahmad Yaqoub Ibrahim (Jordan)

2018 Hassanal Bolkiah Trophy
(Timor-Leste)
Timor-Leste
First title

== Goalscorers ==
3 goals

- (Laos) Phithack Kongmathilath
- (Singapore) Ikhsan Fandi

2 goals

- (Cambodia) Narong Kakada
- (Cambodia) Sos Suhana
- (Myanmar) Hein Htet Aung
- (Singapore) Rusyaidi Salime
- (Timor-Leste) Henrique Cruz
- (Timor-Leste) Rufino Gama

1 goal

- (Brunei) Nazirrudin Ismail
- (Brunei) Yura Indera Putera Yunos
- (Myanmar) Win Naing Tun
- (Myanmar) Zin Min Tun
- (Singapore) Hami Syahin
- (Thailand) Phithak Phaphirom
- (Thailand) Sirimongkol Tungcharoennuruk
- (Thailand) Sittichok Paso
- (Timor-Leste) José Oliveira

Own goal

- (Cambodia) Soeuy Visal (for Myanmar)

== Team statistics ==
As per statistical convention in football, matches decided in extra time are counted as wins and losses, while matches decided by penalty shoot-outs are counted as draws.

Pos	Team	Pld	W	D	L	GF	GA	GD
1	Timor-Leste	5	3	1	1	5	4	+1
2	Cambodia	4	2	0	2	4	4	0
3	Myanmar	4	2	1	1	5	3	+2
4	Singapore	3	1	0	2	6	4	+2
3 Pld
5	Brunei	3	1	0	2	2	3	–1
6	Thailand	3	0	2	1	3	4	–1
2 Pld
7	Laos	2	1	0	1	3	6	–3
