= Viktor Le =

Russian footballer (born 2003)

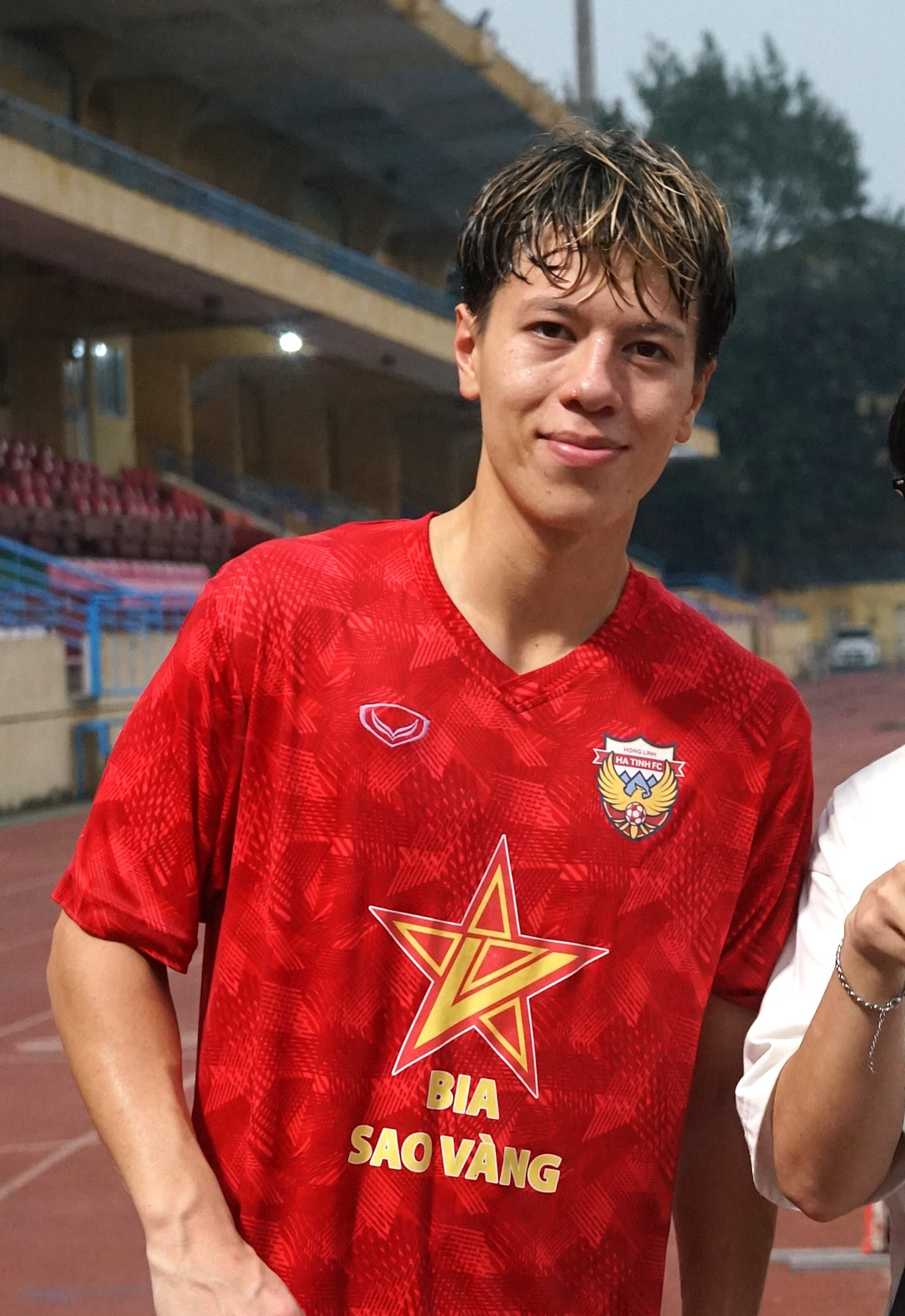
- Viktor Le in 2026

Personal information
- Full name: Lê Viktor
- Birth name: Viktor Khakovich Le
- Date of birth: 10 November 2003 (age 23)
- Place of birth: Moscow, Russia
- Height: 1.78 m (5 ft 10 in)
- Position: Attacking midfielder

Team information
- Current team: Công An Nhân Dân
- Number: 23

Youth career
- 2013–2021: Torpedo Moscow
- 2021–2022: CSKA Moscow

Senior career*
| Years | Team | Apps | (Gls) |
| 2023–2024 | Quy Nhơn Bình Định | 16 | (0) |
| 2024–2026 | Hồng Lĩnh Hà Tĩnh | 64 | (5) |
| 2026– | Công An Nhân Dân | 1 | (0) |

International career^{‡}
| 2025–2026 | Vietnam U23 | 19 | (2) |
Medal record
Men's football
Representing Vietnam
AFC U-23 Asian Cup
| Third place | Saudi Arabia 2026 |
ASEAN U-23 Championship
| Winner | Indonesia 2025 |
- * Club domestic league appearances and goals as of 11 September 2026 ‡ National team caps and goals as of 25 September 2026

Viktor Khakovich Le (Russian: Виктор Хакович Ле, born 10 November 2003), known in Vietnamese as Lê Viktor, is a professional footballer who plays as an attacking midfielder for V.League 2 club Công An Nhân Dân. Born in Russia, he represents Vietnam at youth level.

== Club career ==
He played for the youth academy of Torpedo Moscow and CSKA Moscow.

On 19 January 2023, Viktor signed his first professional contract with Bình Định. He made his debut in a 5–0 loss to Hanoi Police FC on 3 February 2023.

In January 2024, Viktor terminated his contract at Bình Định and signed for Hồng Lĩnh Hà Tĩnh.

In September 2026, Viktor was transferred to V.League 2 club Công An Nhân Dân.

== International career ==
Viktor scored his first goal in a competitive match for Vietnam U-23 against Bangladesh in the 2026 AFC U-23 Asian Cup qualification.

== Personal life ==
Viktor was born in Moscow, Russia to a Russian mother and Vietnamese father. In December 2024, Viktor announced that he had received Vietnamese citizenship.

== Career statistics ==
As of match played 6 July 2024

| Club | Season | League | | | Cup | | Other | | Total | |
| Club | Season | Division | Apps | Goals | Apps | Goals | Apps | Goals | Apps | Goals |
|---|---|---|---|---|---|---|---|---|---|---|
| Binh Dinh FC | 2023 | V.League 1 | 16 | 0 | 2 | 0 | — | | 18 | 0 |
| Binh Dinh FC | 2023–24 | V.League 1 | 0 | 0 | 0 | 0 | — | | 0 | 0 |
| Binh Dinh FC | Total | | 16 | 0 | 2 | 0 | 0 | 0 | 18 | 0 |
| Hong Linh Ha Tinh | 2023–24 | V.League 1 | 14 | 0 | 1 | 0 | 1 (Note: Appearance in V.League 1 relegation play-off) | 0 | 16 | 0 |
| Hong Linh Ha Tinh | 2024–25 | V.League 1 | 0 | 0 | 0 | 0 | 0 | 0 | 0 | 0 |
| Hong Linh Ha Tinh | Total | | 14 | 0 | 1 | 0 | 0 | 0 | 16 | 0 |
| Career total | | | 30 | 0 | 3 | 0 | 1 | 0 | 34 | 0 |

== Honours ==
Vietnam U23

- ASEAN U-23 Championship: 2025
- SEA Games gold medal: 2025
- AFC U-23 Asian Cup third place: 2026
