= Frengky Missa =

Indonesian footballer

Personal information
- Full name: Frengky Deaner Missa
- Date of birth: 20 February 2004 (age 22)
- Place of birth: Soe, East Nusa Tenggara, Indonesia
- Height: 1.66 m (5 ft 5 in)
- Positions: Left-back; winger

Team information
- Current team: Bhayangkara
- Number: 58

Youth career
- 2021–2022: Persija Jakarta

Senior career*
Years	Team	Apps	(Gls)
2022–2024	Persija Jakarta	12	(1)
2023–2024	→ Persikabo 1973 (loan)	23	(1)
2024–	Bhayangkara	38	(4)

International career^{‡}
2022–2023	Indonesia U20	12	(0)
2023–	Indonesia U23	16	(0)
Medal record
Men's football
Representing Indonesia
ASEAN U-23 Championship
Runner-up	2023 Thailand	Team
Runner-up	2025 Indonesia	Team
- * Club domestic league appearances and goals as of 17 May 2026 (UTC) ‡ National team caps and goals as of 12 December 2025 (UTC)

Frengky Deaner Missa (born 20 February 2004) is an Indonesian professional footballer who plays as a left-back or winger for Super League club Bhayangkara.

== Club career ==
=== Persija Jakarta ===
Missa's career began as part of the Persija youth team, and in the 2022–23 season, he promoted to the senior squad.

On 23 July 2022, Missa made his first-team debut by being starting player in a 1–0 loss match against Bali United at Kapten I Wayan Dipta Stadium. He scored his first goal for the club on 31 July 2022 in a 2–1 winning match against Persis at Patriot Candrabhaga Stadium when he was 18 years old.

==== Loan to Persikabo 1973 ====
Missa was signed for Persikabo 1973 to play in Liga 1 in the 2023–24 season, on loan from Persija Jakarta. He made his debut on 3 July 2023 in a match against RANS Nusantara at the Maguwoharjo Stadium, Sleman.

== International career ==
On 14 September 2022, Missa made his debut for Indonesia U-20 national team against Timor-Leste U-20, in a 4–0 win in the 2023 AFC U-20 Asian Cup qualification. In October 2022, it was reported that Frengky received a call-up from the Indonesia U-20 for a training camp, in Turkey and Spain.

== Career statistics ==
=== Club ===
As of 17 May 2026.

Club	Season	League			Cup		Continental		Other		Total	
Club	Season	Division	Apps	Goals	Apps	Goals	Apps	Goals	Apps	Goals	Apps	Goals
Persija Jakarta	2022–23	Liga 1	12	1	0	0	—		4 (Note: Appearances in Indonesia President's Cup)	1	16	2
Persikabo 1973 (loan)	2023–24	Liga 1	23	1	0	0	—		0	0	23	1
Bhayangkara	2024–25	Liga 2	17	4	0	0	—		0	0	17	4
Bhayangkara	2025–26	Super League	21	0	0	0	—		0	0	21	0
Career total			73	6	0	0	0	0	4	1	77	7

== Honours ==
Bhayangkara

- Liga 2 runner-up: 2024–25

Indonesia U23

- AFF U-23 Championship runner-up: 2023, 2025

Individual

- AFF U-23 Championship Team of the Tournament: 2023
