= Brandon Scheunemann =

Indonesian footballer (born 2005)

Personal information
- Full name: Brandon Scheunemann
- Date of birth: 9 March 2005 (age 21)
- Place of birth: Malang, Indonesia
- Height: 1.86 m (6 ft 1 in)
- Position: Centre-back

Team information
- Current team: Madura United
- Number: 16

Youth career
- SSB Putra Gemilang
- Ricky Nelson Academy
- 2021–2022: PSIS Semarang
- 2022–2023: Persis Solo

Senior career*
Years	Team	Apps	(Gls)
2023–2025	PSIS Semarang	6	(0)
2023–2024	→ Persipura Jayapura (loan)	3	(0)
2025	Arema	1	(0)
2026	PSPS Pekanbaru	2	(0)
2026–	Madura United	0	(0)

International career^{‡}
2023	Indonesia U20	2	(0)
2025–	Indonesia U23	4	(0)
Medal record
Men's football
Representing Indonesia
ASEAN U-23 Championship
Runner-up	2025 Indonesia	Team
- * Club domestic league appearances and goals as of 16 January 2026 ‡ National team caps and goals as of 18 November 2025

Brandon Scheunemann (born 9 March 2005) is an Indonesian professional footballer who plays as a centre-back for Super League club Madura United.

== Club career ==
=== Youth ===
As a youth player, he played for SSB Putra Gemilang and the Ricky Nelson Academy.

=== PSIS Semarang ===
He was signed for PSIS Semarang to play in half season 2022–23 Liga 1. Brandon made his debut on 21 January 2023 in a match against Arema at the Jatidiri Stadium, Semarang.

== International career ==
In January 2023, Brandon was called up to the Indonesia U20 for the training centre in preparation for 2023 AFC U-20 Asian Cup. He is eligible to represent Germany internationally.

== Personal life ==
Brandon is the son of the Indonesian-born football coach and former player Timo Scheunemann, and cousin of the footballer Claudia Scheunemann. His father is of German descent and his mother is Indonesian.

== Career statistics ==
=== Club ===
As of 16 January 2026

Club	Season	League			Cup		Continental		Other		Total	
Club	Season	Division	Apps	Goals	Apps	Goals	Apps	Goals	Apps	Goals	Apps	Goals
PSIS Semarang	2022–23	Liga 1	4	0	0	0	–		0	0	4	0
PSIS Semarang	2024–25	Liga 1	2	0	0	0	–		0	0	2	0
Persipura Jayapura (loan)	2023–24	Liga 2	3	0	0	0	–		0	0	3	0
Arema	2024–25	Liga 1	1	0	0	0	–		0	0	1	0
Arema	2025–26	Super League	0	0	0	0	–		0	0	0	0
PSPS Pekanbaru	2025–26	Championship	2	0	0	0	–		0	0	2	0
Career total			12	0	0	0	0	0	0	0	12	0

== Honours ==
Indonesia U23

- ASEAN U-23 Championship runner-up: 2025
