= Nguyễn Xuân Bắc (footballer) =

Vietnamese footballer

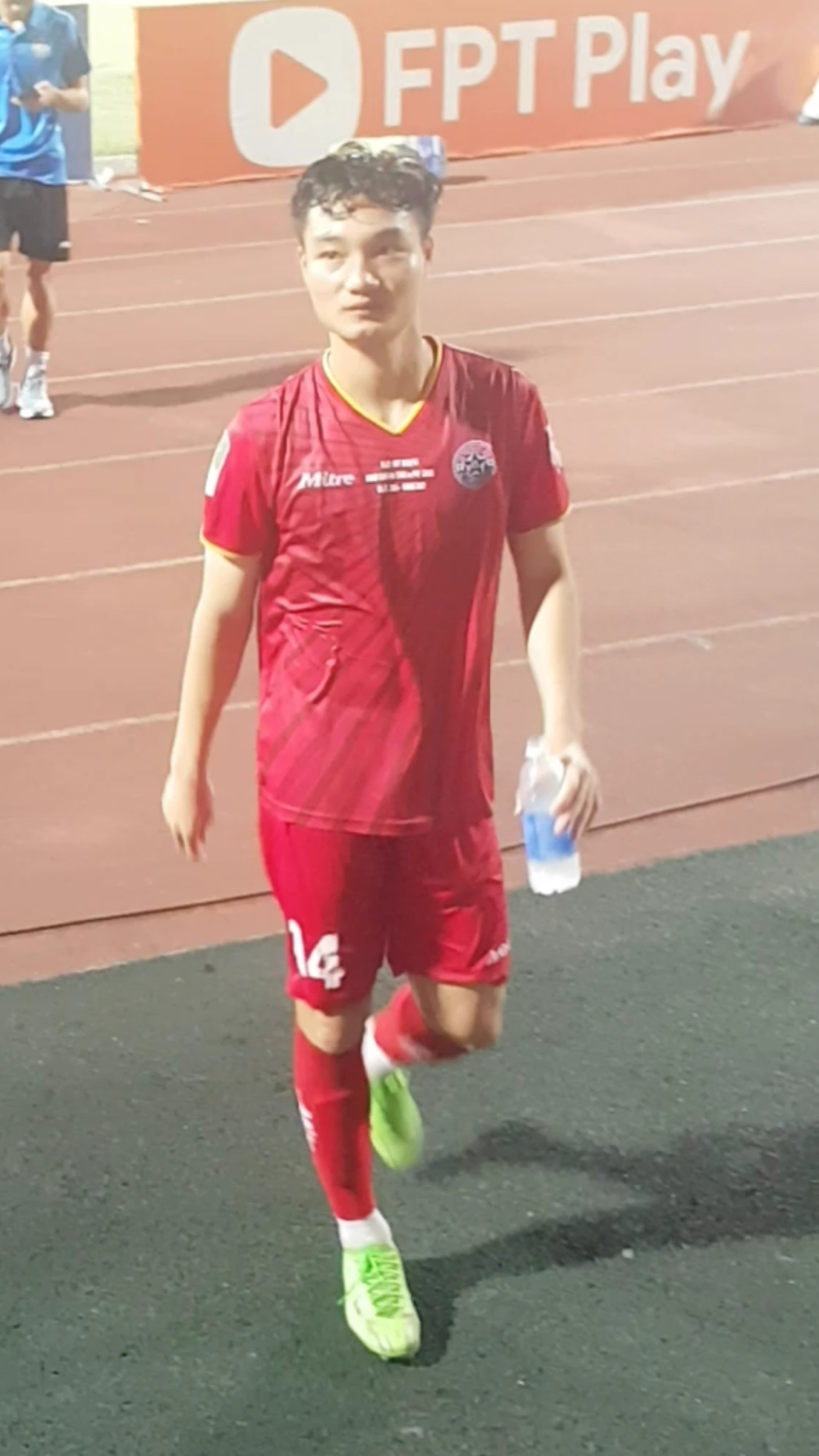
- Xuân Bắc in 2024

Personal information
- Full name: Nguyễn Xuân Bắc
- Date of birth: 3 February 2003 (age 23)
- Place of birth: Đoan Hùng, Phú Thọ, Vietnam
- Height: 1.74 m (5 ft 9 in)
- Positions: Central midfielder; winger

Team information
- Current team: Công An Nhân Dân
- Number: 9

Youth career
- 2012–2022: PVF

Senior career*
Years	Team	Apps	(Gls)
2019–2021	PVF		
2022–	Công An Nhân Dân	98	(10)

International career^{‡}
2022	Vietnam U20	4	(1)
2024–2026	Vietnam U23	27	(1)
Medal record
Men's football
Representing Vietnam
AFC U-23 Asian Cup
Third place	Saudi Arabia 2026
ASEAN U-23 Championship
Winner	Indonesia 2025
- * Club domestic league appearances and goals as of 31 October 2026 ‡ National team caps and goals as of 25 September 2026

Nguyễn Xuân Bắc (born 3 February 2003) is a Vietnamese professional footballer who plays as a central midfielder or winger for V.League 2 club Công An Nhân Dân.

== Club career ==
Born in Phú Thọ, Xuân Bắc joined PVF Football Academy in 2012, after impressing the team coaches during a trial session in his hometown.

Xuân Bắc made his senior debut with PVF in 2019 at the Vietnamese Third Division and contributed in the team's promotion to the Second Division.

In 2022, he was transferred to PVF-CAND in V.League 2, a sister club with PVF. He quickly gained much game time thanks to his versatility, being able to play everywhere in the midfield, as well as a winger. He was named in the V.League 2's Team of the Season at the end of the 2024–25 season after helping his team finish third.

== International career ==
In July 2025, Xuân Bắc was called up to the Vietnam under-23s for the 2025 ASEAN U-23 Championship.

== Career statistics ==
As of match played 31 October 2026

Appearances and goals by club, season and competition
Club	Season	League			Cup		Other		Total	
Club	Season	Division	Apps	Goals	Apps	Goals	Apps	Goals	Apps	Goals
Công An Nhân Dân	2022	V.League 2	18	0	0	0	—		18	0
Công An Nhân Dân	2023	V.League 2	14	1	3	0	—		17	1
Công An Nhân Dân	2023–24	V.League 2	16	1	2	0	1 (Note: Appearances in the V.League 1 promotion/relegation play-offs)	0	19	1
Công An Nhân Dân	2024–25	V.League 2	20	3	2	0	—		22	3
Công An Nhân Dân	2025–26	V.League 1	24	2	0	0	1	0	25	2
Công An Nhân Dân	2026–27	V.League 2	6	1	0	0	—		7	1
Total career			98	10	7	0	2	0	107	10

== Honours ==
Vietnam U23

- ASEAN U-23 Championship: 2025
- SEA Games gold medal: 2025
- AFC U-23 Asian Cup third place: 2026

Individual

- V.League 2 Team of the Season: 2024–25
