= Sittichok Paso =

Thai footballer (born 1999)

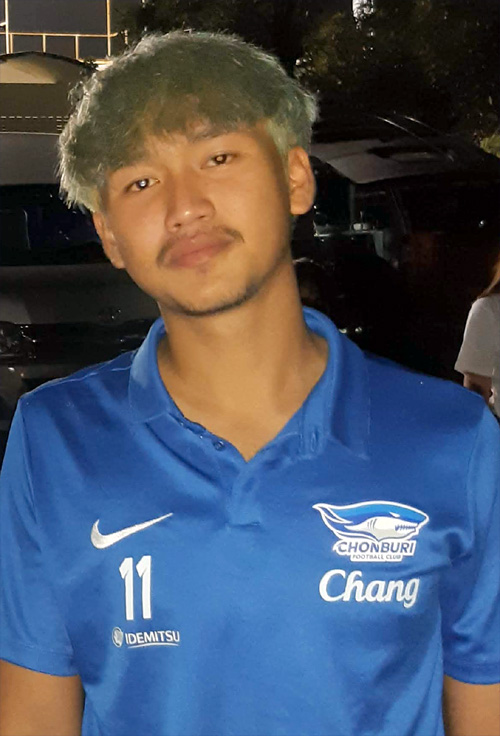

Personal information
- Full name: Sittichok Paso
- Date of birth: 28 January 1999 (age 27)
- Place of birth: Samut Prakan, Thailand
- Height: 1.75 m (5 ft 9 in)
- Positions: Forward; attacking midfielder

Team information
- Current team: Songkhla (on loan from Chonburi)
- Number: 31

Youth career
- 2010–2014: Chonburi

Senior career*
Years	Team	Apps	(Gls)
2014–	Chonburi	57	(3)
2014	→ Sriracha (loan)	8	(1)
2015	→ Phan Thong (loan)	14	(5)
2017	→ Kagoshima United (loan)	5	(0)
2020	→ Trat (loan)	9	(2)
2021–2022	→ FC Ryukyu (loan)	5	(0)
2024	→ Pattaya United (loan)	10	(1)
2024	→ Trat (loan)	15	(0)
2025	→ Suphanburi (loan)	11	(0)
2025	→ Nakhon Ratchasima (loan)	9	(0)
2026–	→ Songkhla (loan)	10	(1)

International career^{‡}
2014	Thailand U16	5	(0)
2016–2018	Thailand U19	13	(12)
2017–2022	Thailand U23	11	(1)
- * Club domestic league appearances and goals as of 01:21, 18 June 2026 (UTC) ‡ National team caps and goals as of 05:14, 9 June 2022 (UTC)

Sittichok Paso (Thai: สิทธิโชค ภาโส, born 28 January 1999) is a Thai professional footballer who plays as a forward for Thai League 2 club Songkhla, on loan from Chonburi.

== Club career ==
Sittichok Paso was chosen from The Guardian to be 60 of the best young talents in world football in 2016 that could be the one from Southeast Asia who finally debut in Europe.

=== Chonburi ===
Born in Samut Prakan province in Bangkok Metropolitan, Thailand, Sittichok became in sight of Witthaya Laohakul, a legendary football coach of Thailand, at the age of 12 from his superb form in the Prime Minister Cup, a regarded youth competition in Thailand. By the recommendation of Witthaya, who was then the technical director of Chonburi, Sittichok moved to study at a primary school in Chonburi in order to enter into the Chonburi academy. After impressive form during the loan spells with Sriracha and Phan Thong, he made his debut Thai Premier League in the second leg of season 2015 as a first-team player at the age of 16.

==== Kagoshima United (loan) ====
At early December 2016, Sittichok, together with his teammate Worachit, participated in J-League Open Trials 2016 and performed well in that trial. His excellent performance caught the sight of Kagoshima United that offered him another trial in January 2017. By his success in this trial, Sittichok signed the loan contract from Chonburi and became a first-team member of Kagoshima United since January 24, 2017 for initially one year.

==== FC Ryukyu (loan) ====
On 19 January 2021, it was announced that Sittichok had joined club FC Ryukyu on a season-long loan deal.

== International career ==
On 26 May 2022, Paso was called up to the Thailand under-23 for the 2022 AFC U-23 Asian Cup.

=== International goals ===
==== Thailand U19 ====
No.	Date	Venue	Opponent	Score	Result	Competition
1.	14 September 2016	Vietnam Youth Training Centre, Hanoi, Vietnam	Indonesia	1–2	3–2	2016 AFF U-19 Youth Championship
2.	14 September 2016	Vietnam Youth Training Centre, Hanoi, Vietnam	Indonesia	2–2	3–2	2016 AFF U-19 Youth Championship
3.	19 October 2016	Khalifa Sports City Stadium, Isa Town, Bahrain	Bahrain	1–1	2–3	2016 AFC U-19 Championship
4.	4 November 2017	MFF Football Centre, Ulaanbaatar, Mongolia	Singapore	1–0	3–1	2018 AFC U-19 Championship qualification
5.	4 November 2017	MFF Football Centre, Ulaanbaatar, Mongolia	Singapore	2–0	3–1	2018 AFC U-19 Championship qualification
6.	4 November 2017	MFF Football Centre, Ulaanbaatar, Mongolia	Singapore	3–1	3–1	2018 AFC U-19 Championship qualification
7.	6 November 2017	MFF Football Centre, Ulaanbaatar, Mongolia	Mongolia	1–0	5–2	2018 AFC U-19 Championship qualification
8.	6 November 2017	MFF Football Centre, Ulaanbaatar, Mongolia	Mongolia	3–1	5–2	2018 AFC U-19 Championship qualification
11.	27 April 2018	Hassanal Bolkiah National Stadium, Bandar Seri Begawan, Brunei	Brunei	1–1	1–2	2018 Hassanal Bolkiah Trophy
12.	5 July 2018	Gelora Delta Stadium, Sidoarjo, Indonesia	Singapore	3–0	6–0	2018 AFF U-19 Youth Championship

==== Thailand U23 ====
No.	Date	Venue	Opponent	Score	Result	Competition
1.	26 March 2022	The Sevens Stadium, Dubai, United Arab Emirates	China	1–1	2–4	2022 Dubai Cup U-23
