= PSSI Anniversary Cup =

- Organising body: Football Association of Indonesia (PSSI)
- Founded: 2018
- Number of teams: 4
- Current champions: Bahrain (1st title)
- Most successful team(s): Bahrain (1 title)

The PSSI Anniversary Cup is a four-team under-23 association football tournament held at Pakansari Stadium in Cibinong, Bogor Regency, Indonesia. It has been held annually since 2018. The tournament is organised to commemorate the anniversary of Football Association of Indonesia (PSSI).

== Results ==
Year
Year	Champions	Runners-up	Third place	Fourth place
2018; Details	Bahrain	Uzbekistan	Indonesia	North Korea
