= Hokky Caraka =

Indonesian footballer

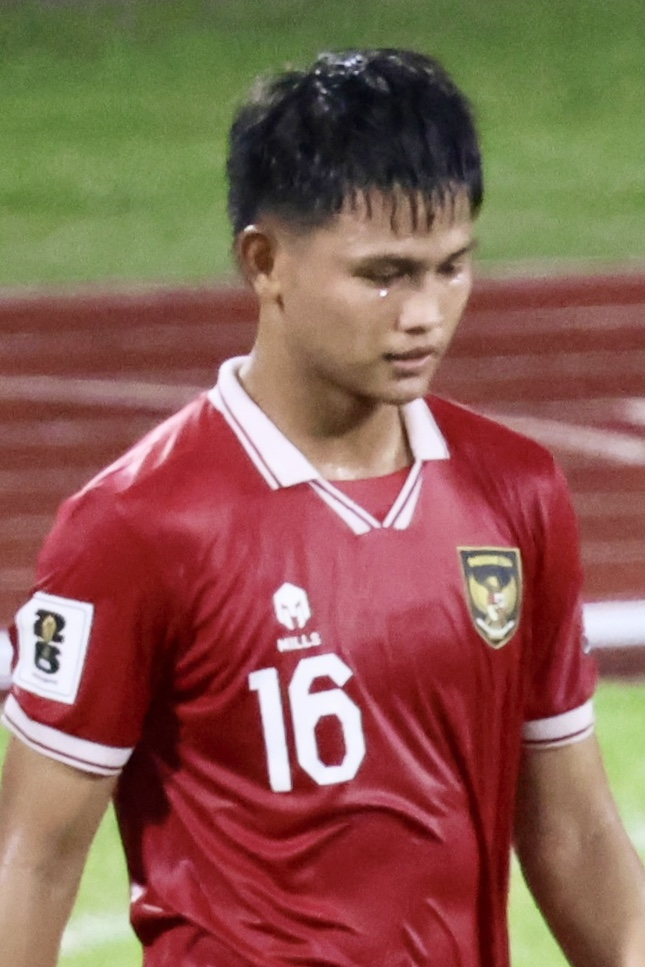
- Hokky playing for Indonesia in 2023

Personal information
- Full name: Hokky Caraka Bintang Briliant
- Date of birth: 21 August 2004 (age 22)
- Place of birth: Gunungkidul, Indonesia
- Height: 1.80 m (5 ft 11 in)
- Position: Forward

Team information
- Current team: Persita Tangerang
- Number: 11

Youth career
- SSB Handayani
- 2018–2019: Persopi Piyungan
- 2020–2021: PSS Sleman
- 2021–2022: Garuda Select

Senior career*
| Years | Team | Apps | (Gls) |
| 2021–2025 | PSS Sleman | 68 | (8) |
| 2025– | Persita Tangerang | 37 | (4) |

International career^{‡}
| 2022–2023 | Indonesia U20 | 21 | (9) |
| 2023–2025 | Indonesia U23 | 17 | (1) |
| 2023– | Indonesia | 11 | (2) |
Medal record
Men's football
Representing Indonesia
ASEAN U-23 Championship
| Runner-up | 2025 Indonesia | Team |
- * Club domestic league appearances and goals as of 31 October 2026 ‡ National team caps and goals as of 12 December 2025

Hokky Caraka Bintang Briliant (born 21 August 2004) is an Indonesian professional footballer who plays as a forward for Super League club Persita Tangerang and the Indonesia national team.

== Club career ==
=== PSS Sleman ===
He was signed for PSS Sleman to play in Liga 1 in the 2021 season. Hokky made his professional league debut on 25 September 2021 in a match against Madura United at the Gelora Bung Karno Madya Stadium, Jakarta.

== International career ==
On 30 May 2022, Hokky made his debut for an Indonesian youth team against a Venezuela U-20 squad in the 2022 Maurice Revello Tournament in France. On 4 July 2022, Caraka scored a quatrick against Brunei U-19 in a 7–0 win in the 2022 AFF U-19 Youth Championship.

On 14 September 2022, Hokky scored a hattrick against Timor-Leste U-20, in a 4–0 win in the 2023 AFC U-20 Asian Cup qualification. In October 2022, it was reported that Hokky received a call-up from the Indonesia U-20 for a training camp, in Turkey and Spain.

In October 2023, Hokky received a call up to the senior team. He would make his debut on 12 October 2023, against Brunei in the 2026 FIFA World Cup qualifiers first leg in a 6–0 victory. Few days later, Hokky would scored a brace in the second leg.

Hokky was named in the final squad for the 2023 AFC Asian Cup tournament. He would play in only one game against Vietnam in a 1–0 win.

On 25 November 2024, Hokky received a called up to the preliminary squad to the Indonesia national team for the 2024 ASEAN Championship.

== Career statistics ==
=== Club ===
As of 31 October 2026.

| Club | Season | League | | Cup | | Continental | | Other | | Total | |
| Club | Season | Apps | Goals | Apps | Goals | Apps | Goals | Apps | Goals | Apps | Goals |
|---|---|---|---|---|---|---|---|---|---|---|---|
| PSS Sleman | 2021–22 | 3 | 0 | 0 | 0 | – | | 0 | 0 | 3 | 0 |
| PSS Sleman | 2022–23 | 11 | 0 | 0 | 0 | – | | 0 | 0 | 11 | 0 |
| PSS Sleman | 2023–24 | 27 | 4 | 0 | 0 | – | | 0 | 0 | 27 | 4 |
| PSS Sleman | 2024–25 | 27 | 3 | 0 | 0 | – | | 0 | 0 | 27 | 3 |
| Persita Tangerang | 2025–26 | 30 | 4 | 0 | 0 | – | | 0 | 0 | 30 | 4 |
| Persita Tangerang | 2026–27 | 7 | 0 | 0 | 0 | – | | 0 | 0 | 7 | 0 |
| Career total | | 105 | 11 | 0 | 0 | 0 | 0 | 0 | 0 | 105 | 11 |

=== International ===
As of match played 21 December 2024

Appearances and goals by national team and year
| National team | Year | Apps | Goals |
|---|---|---|---|
| Indonesia | 2023 | 4 | 2 |
| Indonesia | 2024 | 7 | 0 |
| Total | | 11 | 2 |

As of match played 21 March 2024
Scores and results list Indonesia's goal tally first, score column indicates score after each Hokky goal.

List of international goals scored by Hokky Caraka
| No. | Date | Venue | Cap | Opponent | Score | Result | Competition |
|---|---|---|---|---|---|---|---|
| 1 | 17 October 2023 | Hassanal Bolkiah National Stadium, Bandar Seri Begawan, Brunei | 2 | Brunei | 1–0 | 6–0 | 2026 FIFA World Cup qualification |
| 2 | 17 October 2023 | Hassanal Bolkiah National Stadium, Bandar Seri Begawan, Brunei | 2 | Brunei | 3–0 | 6–0 | 2026 FIFA World Cup qualification |

== Honours ==
Indonesia U23

- ASEAN U-23 Championship runner-up: 2025

Individual

- Super League Goal of the Month: December 2025
