= Rayhan Hannan =

Indonesian footballer

- Hannan with Persija in 2026

Personal information
- Full name: Muhammad Rayhan Hannan
- Date of birth: 2 April 2004 (age 22)
- Place of birth: Jakarta, Indonesia
- Height: 1.72 m (5 ft 8 in)
- Positions: Attacking midfielder; winger

Team information
- Current team: Persija Jakarta
- Number: 58

Youth career
- SSB Bina Taruna Cibubur
- 2021: Persija U18
- 2022: Brisbane Roar Youth

Senior career*
Years	Team	Apps	(Gls)
2022–	Persija Jakarta	76	(9)

International career^{‡}
2023–2025	Indonesia U23	15	(2)
2024–	Indonesia	8	(0)
Medal record
Men's football
Representing Indonesia
FIFA ASEAN Cup
Winner	2026 Indonesia	Team
ASEAN U-23 Championship
Runner-up	2025 Indonesia	Team
- * Club domestic league appearances and goals as of 8 November 2026 ‡ National team caps and goals as of 5 October 2026

Muhammad Rayhan Hannan (born 2 April 2004) is an Indonesian professional footballer who plays as an attacking midfielder or winger for Super League club Persija Jakarta and the Indonesia national team.

== Club career ==
=== Persija Jakarta ===
Hannan is one of the young players promoted from the Persija U18 who will compete in the 2022 Indonesia President's Cup and Liga 1. On 18 June 2022, Hannan made his club debut for in a pre-season 2022 Indonesia President's Cup against Barito Putera in a 0–2 lose. After getting a few minutes of play with Persija's first team in the Indonesia President's Cup, he had a trial with Australian club Brisbane Roar Youth in October 2022. He spent two months training with Brisbane Roar Youth.

On 3 July 2023, Hannan made his professional debut in a 1–1 draw against PSM Makassar as a substituted for Ryo Matsumura in the 89th minute.

== International career ==
On 29 August 2023, Rayhan received a call up to the under-23 team for the 2024 AFC U-23 Asian Cup qualification. He made his debut for the under-23 team against Chinese Taipei.

== Career statistics ==
=== International ===
As of match played 5 October 2026

Appearances and goals by national team and year
National team	Year	Apps	Goals
Indonesia	2024	3	0
Indonesia	2026	5	0
Total		8	0

== Honours ==
Indonesia U23

- ASEAN U-23 Championship runner-up: 2025

Indonesia

- FIFA ASEAN Cup: 2026
