= Street storming =

Vietnamese sports fan phenomenon

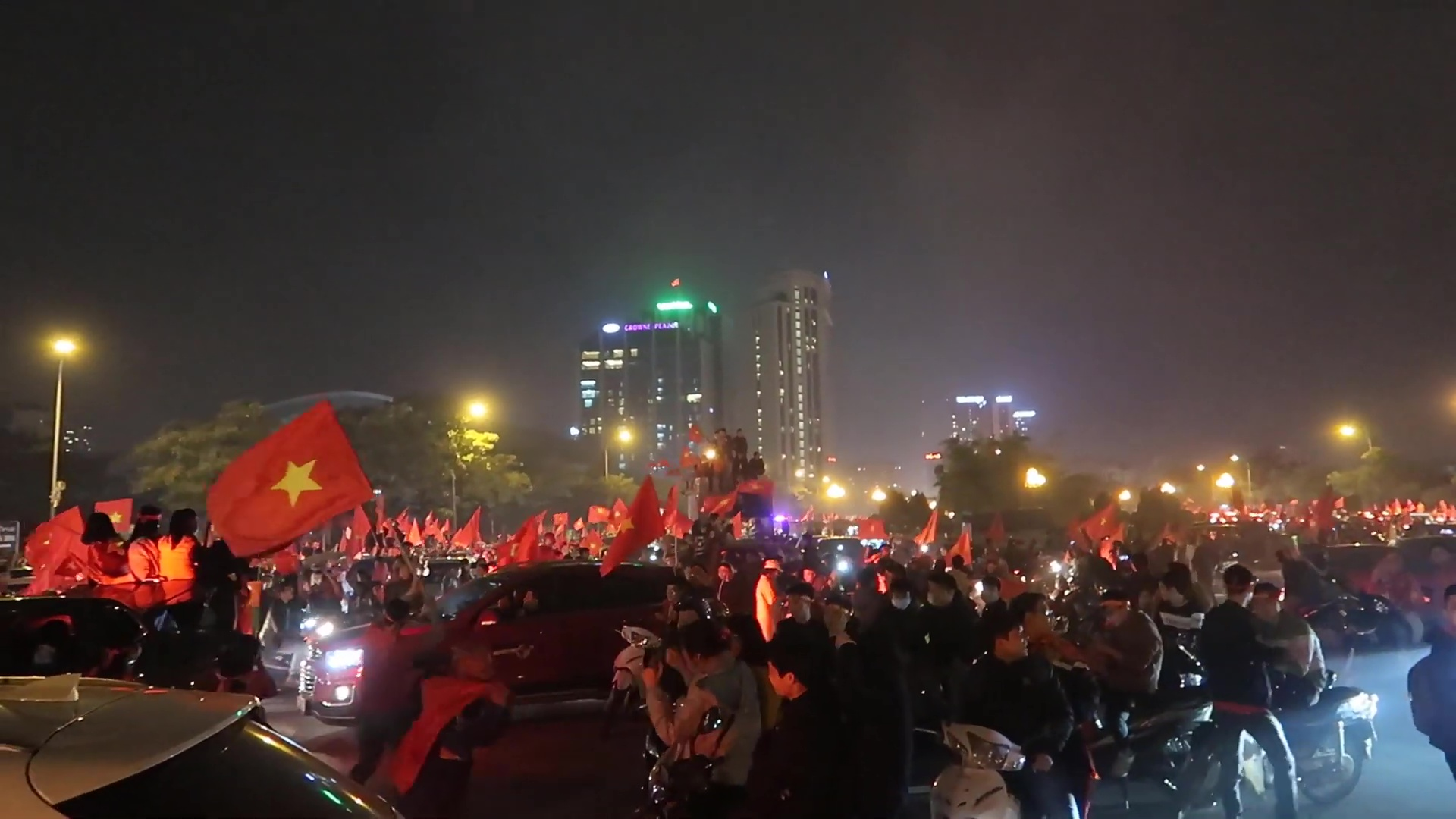
Street storming in 2018

Street storming (Vietnamese: đi bão, lit. 'going storming') is a social phenomenon in Vietnam that occurs in response to major sport victories, notably that of the Vietnam national football team. They are spontaneous celebrations that take place throughout the streets on motorbikes, which are ubiquitous as the country's primary mode of transportation. The term can also be used to refer to street racing and other kinds of public disturbances.

== Overview ==
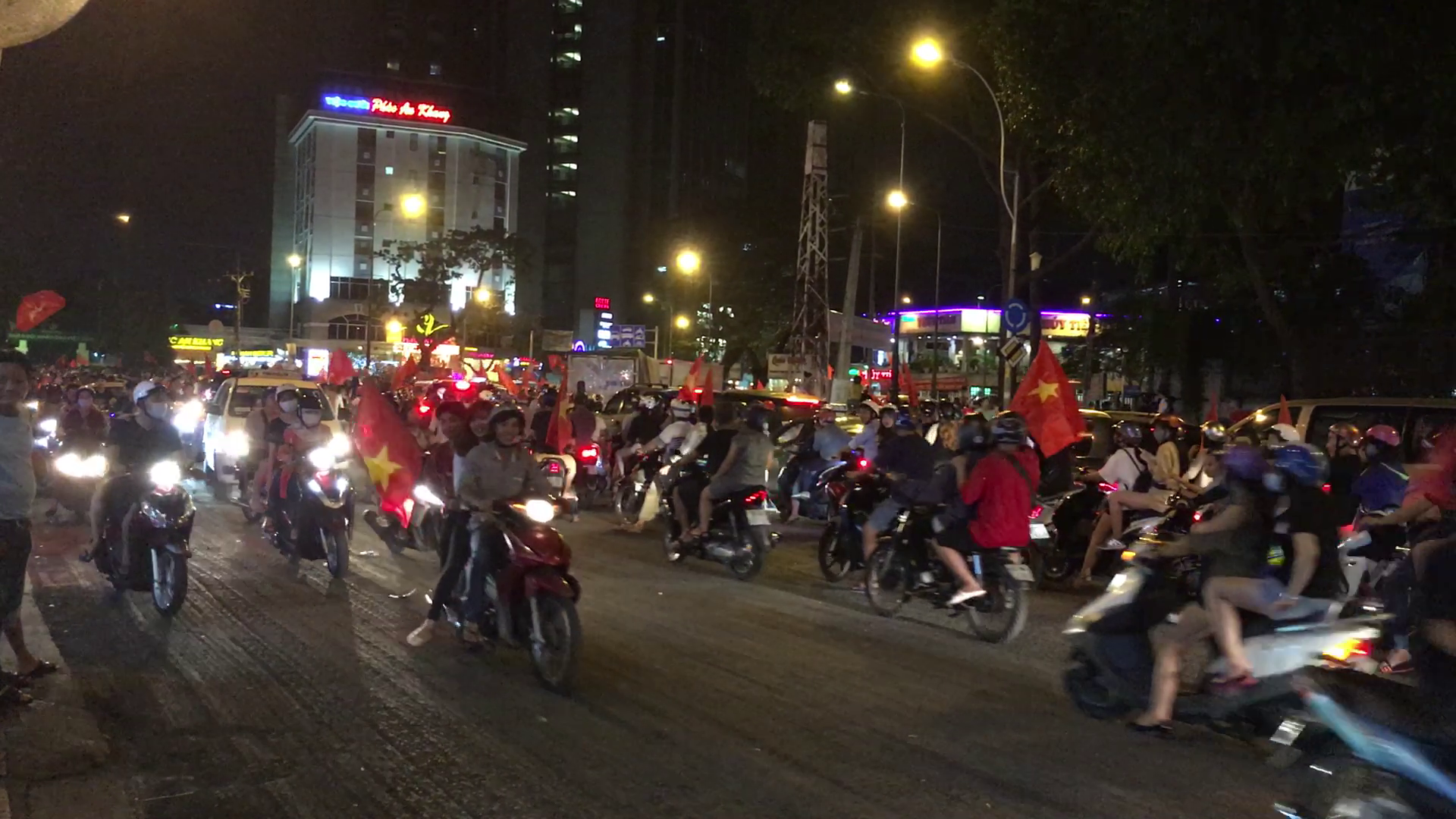
Street storming on 23 January 2018, in Ho Chi Minh City

Association football is the most popular sport in Vietnam. Google search trends for 2018 in Vietnam show that football was the most searched topic by Vietnamese internet users. Former Prime Minister Nguyễn Xuân Phúc commented that football inspired patriotism and national pride in Vietnam. Taking to the streets to celebrate whenever the national team wins an important match is a habit of Vietnamese supporters, which is one of the culture shocks for foreign visitors.

Street storming usually occurs when millions of people parade the streets while waving the national flags, honking, singing songs, banging pots and pans, and zipping up and down streets on motorbikes. During street storming, the participants cheer, shake hands and hug each other, even to strangers.

== History ==
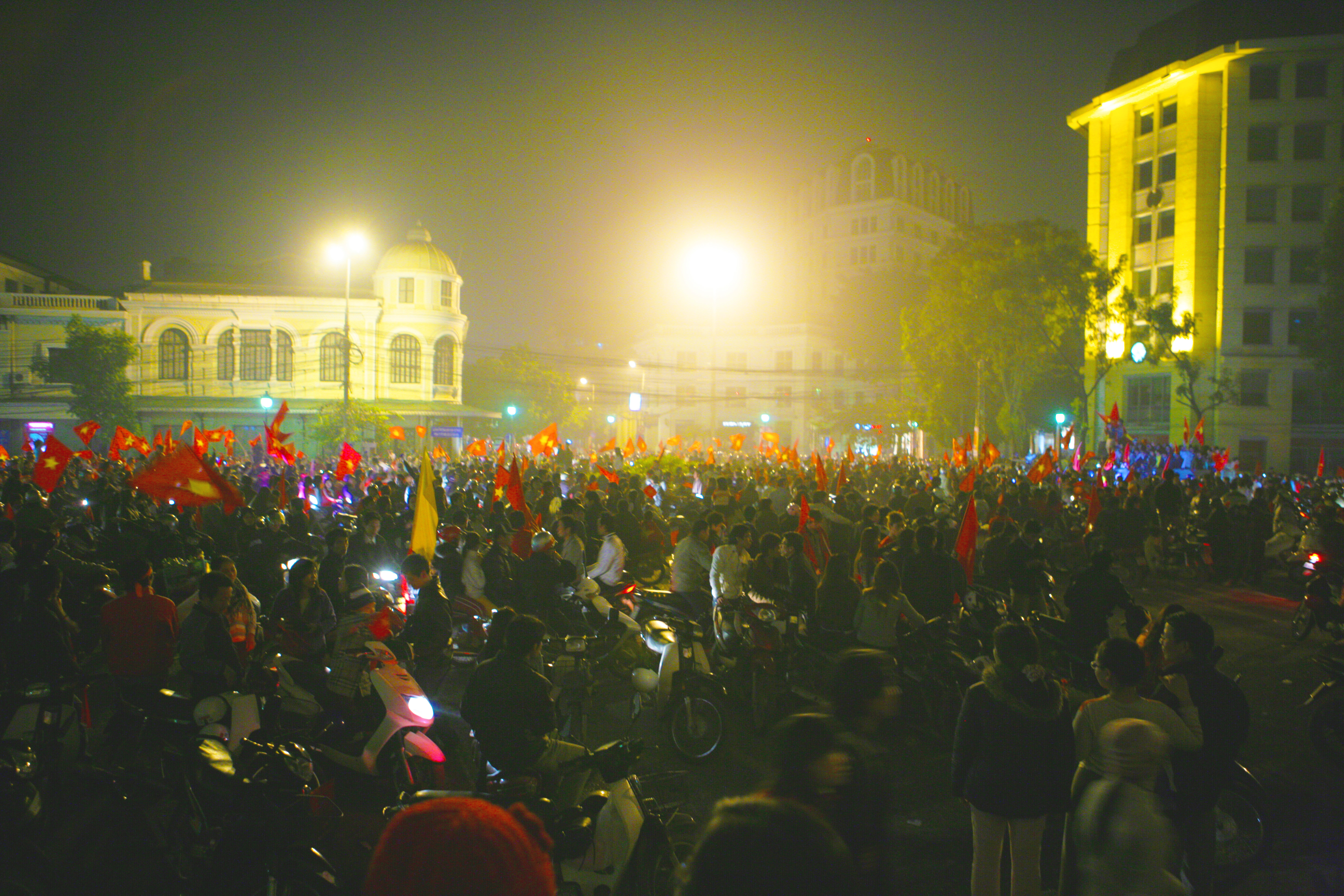
A massive gathering on December 28, 2008

The first recorded occurrences of street storming in Vietnam were in 1995 with the participation of Vietnam national football team in the Southeast Asian Games. After Vietnam's first victorious match against Malaysia on December 4, Vietnamese fans across the country flocked to the streets to cheer and celebrate. As the national team advanced further in the tournament, the gatherings gradually grew bigger and lasted longer, climaxing with Vietnam ending up as the runner-up, when "a sea of people" gathered to welcome the team as they returned on December 18. According to former football player Trần Công Minh, the team was surprised and excited by the lively scene and love of the fans. Since then, street storming has become a distinctive feature and leisure activity of Vietnamese football fans.

The next instance and the first nationwide street storming occurred in 1998 after the national team defeated Thailand 3–0 in the semi-final match of the 1998 AFF Championship. Five years later, street storming happened again when Vietnamese football supporters in Hanoi, Ho Chi Minh City and other provinces took to the streets to celebrate after the Vietnam U-23 won the semi-final match against Malaysia in the 2003 Southeast Asian Games on December 9, 2003. In the 2008 AFF Suzuki Cup, the streets of Vietnam were once again stormed following the victorious games against Singapore and Thailand on December 21, 24, and 28, in celebration of the nation's first championship. One year later, on December 14, the fans around the country celebrated the 4–1 victory against Singapore in 2009 Southeast Asian Games, although Vietnam later lost to Malaysia in the final match.

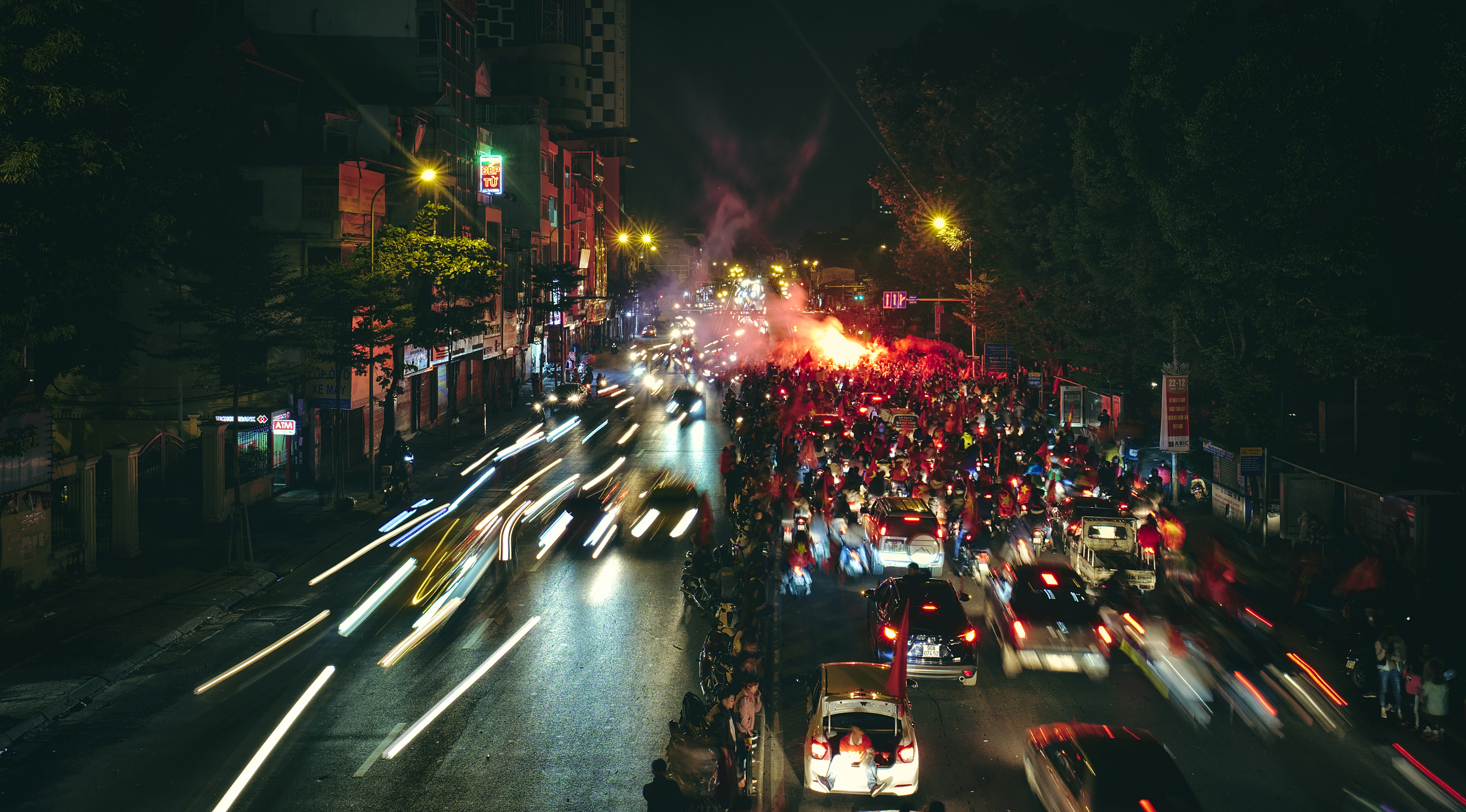
Street storming on December 15, 2018, in Hanoi

After this tournament, Vietnam football team achieved no major successes for nearly 10 years and street storming did not occur again until Vietnam U23, led by the new head coach Park Hang-seo, unexpectedly passed the group stage of the 2018 AFC U-23 Championship before defeating Iraq in January 20 and Qatar in January 23 in the quarter-final and semi-final, respectively. Park Hang-seo's following successes with the 2018 AFF Suzuki Cup's championship, the 2019 AFC Asian Cup's quarter-final round, a victory in the World Cup qualification second round, and the 2019 Southeast Asian Games as well as the 2021 Southeast Asian Games' football gold medal also led to massive celebrations across the country. During the street storming, FIFA president Gianni Infantino also took flied from Oman to Hanoi, expressed his impression of the enthusiasm of Vietnamese football fans.

"Never before have so many people taken to the streets to celebrate"

— Prime Minister of Vietnam, Nguyễn Xuân Phúc in 11 December 2019.

Following the Vietnam 2–1 victory over Thailand in the 2024 ASEAN Championship final, people took to the streets, demonstrating the country's strong passion for football. Fans congregated in cities such as Hanoi and Hue, waving flags, set off red fireworks and chanting in unison. Some have suggested the celebrations highlighted a spirit of unity, with people coming together to celebrate their national team's win. Some supporters demonstrated discipline by observing traffic restrictions and not running red lights.

On 29 July 2025, just after the 2025 ASEAN U-23 Championship final, people began to street storming again on the same year just after the match ends, fans got outside in three cities such as Hanoi, Ho Chi Minh City and Hue; including a 91-year-old woman, who received much press interest for her enthusiasm for taking part in the celebrations.

== Consequences and casualty ==
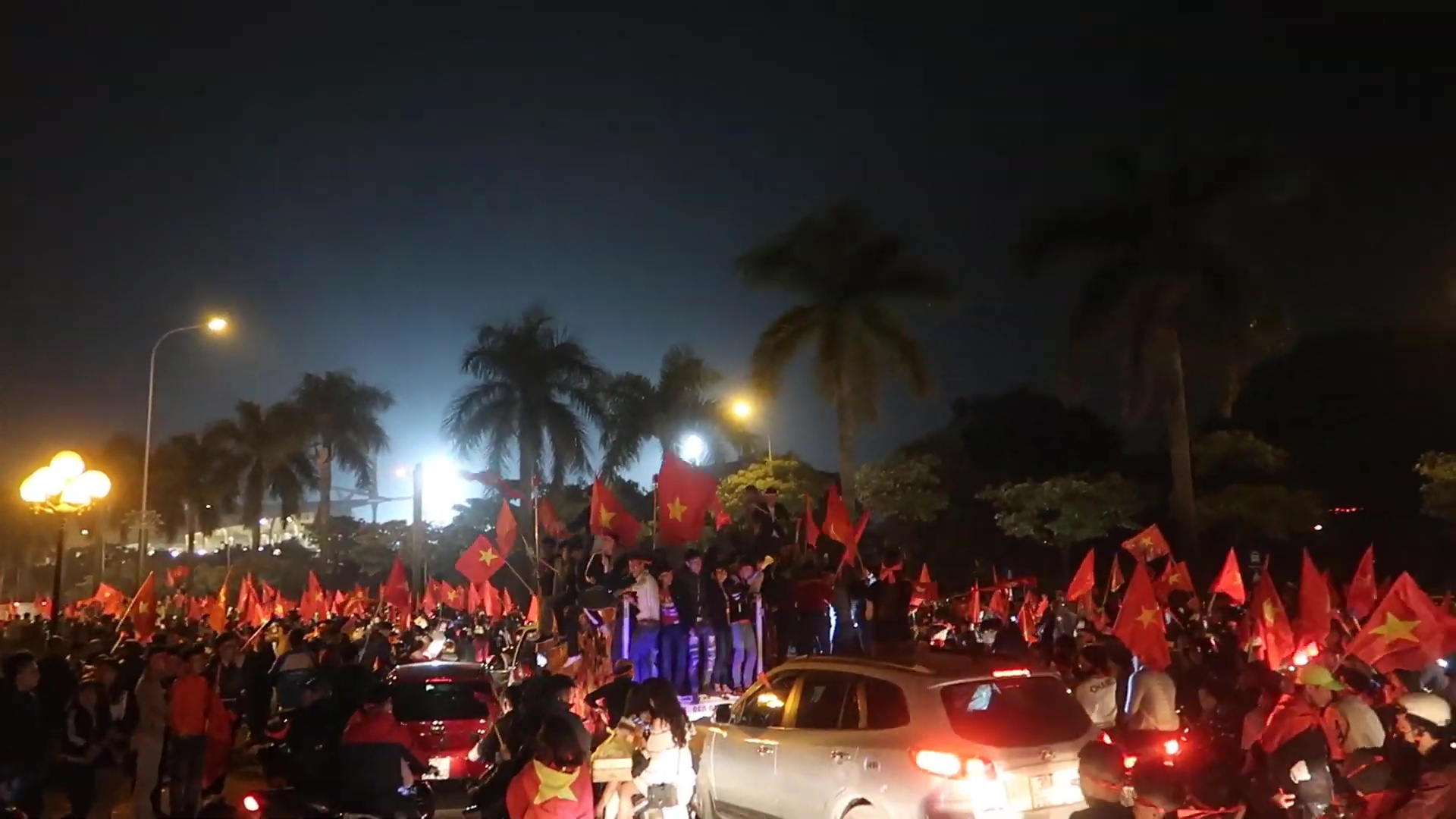
Street storming in Hanoi after the national team won the 2018 AFF Championship on 15 December 2018

After Vietnam's 2008 AFF Championship win, at least four people were killed during the celebration night, with 183 emergency cases of people injured in Ho Chi Minh City and 63 cases of people injured in traffic accidents in Hanoi.

After the street storming on 10 December 2019, 50 traffic accidents were reported with 31 dead and 35 injured.

During the street storming on 29 July 2025, Vietnamese police caught 10 people, including 8 people who are under 18-years-old, not qualified to drive a vehicle according to regulations. Many violations include: not wearing a helmet, carrying too many people, not having a driver's license, etc. The police also reported that there are no traffic accidents during this street storming.

== Criticism ==
Journalist Nguyễn Lưu criticized street storming, calling it "misguided fan culture" and a sign of "low education".

== Other varieties ==
=== Yemen ===
Shortly after the 2021 WAFF U-15 Championship, where Yemen created history by winning the tournament by beating Saudi Arabia on penalties, street storming began to occur across Yemen with thousands of Yemenis stormed the streets in all around the country with mass celebration, a rare display of unity of people of Yemen amidst the ongoing Yemeni civil war, and was congratulated by then-President of Yemen, Abdrabbuh Mansur Hadi.

=== Other countries ===
Many countries around the world also have similar celebrations to "street storming" to congratulate the achievements of their national team, such as the people of Argentina celebrating their team's victory in the 2022 FIFA World Cup, or fans of the Spain national team celebrating the UEFA Euro 2024 championship, etc.

== See also ==
- Fanwalk
- Fan zone
- Football hooliganism
- Pitch invasion
- Sports riot
