= Muhammad Ardiansyah =

Indonesian footballer

Ardiansyah
Personal information
- Full name: Muhammad Ardiansyah
- Date of birth: 23 March 2003 (age 23)
- Place of birth: Makassar, Indonesia
- Height: 1.80 m (5 ft 11 in)
- Position: Goalkeeper

Team information
- Current team: PSM Makassar
- Number: 1

Youth career
- 2019–2020: Borneo
- 2021: PSM Makassar

Senior career*
Years	Team	Apps	(Gls)
2022–	PSM Makassar	12	(0)
2026	→ Persijap Jepara (loan)	5	(0)

International career^{‡}
2025	Indonesia U23	5	(0)
Medal record
Men's football
Representing Indonesia
ASEAN U-23 Championship
Runner-up	Indonesia 2025	Team
- * Club domestic league appearances and goals as of 23 May 2026 ‡ National team caps and goals as of 26 May 2026

Muhammad Ardiansyah (born 23 March 2003) is an Indonesian professional footballer who plays as a goalkeeper for Super League club PSM Makassar.

== Club career ==
=== PSM Makassar ===
Ardiansyah was part of the PSM Makassar youth team from 2021, earning a spot on the senior team ahead of the 2021-22 Liga 1 season. Ardiansyah made his league debut on 6 April 2023 in a match against PSIS Semarang at the Jatidiri Stadium, Semarang.

== Honours ==
PSM Makassar

- Liga 1: 2022–23

Indonesia U-23

- ASEAN U-23 Championship runner-up: 2025

Individual

- ASEAN U-23 Championship Best Goalkeeper: 2025
