= 2005 AFF U-23 Youth Championship =

2005 Football tournament

2005 AFF U-23 Championship
AFF U-23 Youth Championship Thailand 2005

Tournament details
- Host country: Thailand
- Dates: 29 August – 7 September
- Teams: 8 (from 1 confederation)
- Venues: 4 (in 1 host city)

Final positions
- Champions: Thailand (1st title)
- Runners-up: Singapore
- Third place: Myanmar
- Fourth place: Malaysia

Tournament statistics
- Matches played: 16
- Goals scored: 72 (4.5 per match)

The 2005 AFF U-23 Youth Championship was the first ever edition of the AFF U-23 Youth Championship, organised by ASEAN Football Federation. The tournament was held from 29 August to 7 September in Bangkok, Thailand. This tournament was also known as the pre-SEA Games tournament, as a preparatory tournament for the nations competing in the Manila SEA Games in December of the same year.

== Squads ==
- Philippines squad
- Singapore squad

== Venues ==
Bangkok
Supachalasai Stadium	Thai Army Sports Stadium
Capacity: 40,000	Capacity: 20,000
Thephasadin Stadium	Thai-Japanese Stadium
Capacity: 6,378	Capacity: 6,600

== Tournament ==
All times are Thailand Standard Time (TST) - UTC+7

=== Group stage ===
==== Group A ====
Team	Pld	W	D	L	GF	GA	GD	Pts
Myanmar	3	2	1	0	14	3	+11	7
Malaysia	3	2	1	0	6	2	+4	7
Philippines	3	1	0	2	7	9	−2	3
Timor-Leste	3	0	0	3	1	14	−13	0

30 August 2005
17:45

Philippines	2–6	Myanmar

Suphachalasai Stadium

30 August 2005
20:30

Malaysia	3–0	Timor-Leste

Suphachalasai Stadium

1 September 2005
17:45

Myanmar	7–0	Timor-Leste

Suphachalasai Stadium
1 September 2005
20:30

Malaysia	2–1	Philippines

Suphachalasai Stadium

3 September 2005
17:45

Timor-Leste	1–4	Philippines
unknown (?)	Report	Ombos (?); Jaugan (?); J. Orcullo (?); Caligdong (?)

Suphachalasai Stadium

3 September 2005
20:30

Myanmar	1–1	Malaysia

Suphachalasai Stadium

==== Group B ====
Team	Pld	W	D	L	GF	GA	GD	Pts
Thailand	3	3	0	0	15	2	+13	9
Singapore	3	2	0	1	7	7	0	6
Laos	3	1	0	2	5	6	−1	3
Cambodia	3	0	0	3	2	14	−12	0

29 August 2005
17:45

Singapore	3–2	Cambodia
Shi Jiayi 44'; Fazrul 70'; Baihakki (90+?)	Report	unknown 6' unknown 73'

Suphachalasai Stadium

29 August 2005
20:30

Laos	1–3	Thailand

Suphachalasai Stadium

31 August 2005
17:45

Cambodia	0–8	Thailand

Suphachalasai Stadium
31 August 2005
20:30

Laos	1–3	Singapore
Lamnao 2'	Report	Tengku 73'; Shahril 76'; Fazrul 88'

Suphachalasai Stadium

2 September 2005
17:45

Thailand	4–1	Singapore
Teerathep 34', 67'; Prat 65'; Jakkrit 85'	Report	Ruhaizad 14'

Suphachalasai Stadium

2 September 2005
20:30

Cambodia	0–3	Laos

Suphachalasai Stadium

=== Knockout stage ===
==== Bracket ====
Semi-finals
5 September – Bangkok (Thai-Japanese)
Myanmar	1
Singapore	2
5 September – Bangkok (Thai Army Sports)
Thailand	7
Malaysia	0

Final
7 September – Bangkok (Thai Army Sports)
Singapore	0
Thailand	3
Third place
7 September – Bangkok (Thephasadin)
Myanmar (p)	1 (4)
Malaysia	1 (2)

==== Semi-finals ====
5 September 2005
16:00

Myanmar	1–2	Singapore
Soe Myat Min 53'	Report	Shi Jiayi 32'; Itimi 84'

Thai-Japanese Stadium

5 September 2005
17:45

Thailand	7–0	Malaysia

Thai Army Sports Stadium

==== Third place play-off ====
7 September 2005
17:45

Myanmar	1–1	Malaysia
Penalties
	4–2

Thephasadin Stadium

==== Final ====
7 September 2005
20:30

Singapore	0–3	Thailand
	Report	Teerathep 8', 78' (pen.); Sompong (90+?)

Thai Army Sports Stadium

== Winner ==
2005 AFF U-23 Youth Championship winner

Thailand
First title
