= 2018 PSSI Anniversary Cup =

Tournament details
- Host country: Indonesia
- Dates: 27 April – 3 May 2018
- Teams: 4

Final positions
- Champions: Bahrain
- Runners-up: Uzbekistan
- Third place: Indonesia
- Fourth place: North Korea

Tournament statistics
- Matches played: 6
- Goals scored: 16 (2.67 per match)
- Top scorer(s): (Bahrain) Mohamed Marhoon (3 goals)

The 2018 PSSI Anniversary Cup was a four-team under-23 association football tournament held at Pakansari Stadium in Cibinong, Bogor Regency from 27 April until 3 May 2018. The tournament was organised to commemorate the 88th anniversary of Football Association of Indonesia (PSSI). Earlier, the tournament was expected to be kicked off on 28 April, however PSSI later changed it on 27 April due to Liga 1 matches that were to be held on that day.

Bahrain emerged as the tournament champion with 7 points ahead of the rest of the teams.

== Participating nations ==
A total of four nations comprising host Indonesia, Bahrain, North Korea and Malaysia have earlier announced their participation in the tournament. On 12 April 2018, Malaysia announced their withdrawal as the tournament date is coinciding with their league schedule that resulted in each of their players to be busy with their respective club matches that will prevent them from playing with the national team. Two replacement candidates from Senegal and Uzbekistan are then called by PSSI, with Thailand, Vietnam, Turkmenistan and Tajikistan being also decided as other potential candidates despite both Thailand and Vietnam having responded that their players were also busy with tight league schedules in their country. The PSSI later decided Uzbekistan as the suitable replacement candidate.

- Indonesia (Host)
- Bahrain
- North Korea
- Uzbekistan (replacing Malaysia)

== Match officials ==
The following referees and their assistants were chosen for the tournament.

Referees

- (Cambodia) Khoun Virak
- (Hong Kong) Luk Kin Sun
- (Indonesia) Mustafa Umarella
- (Indonesia) Yudi Nurcahya

Assistant referees

- (Hong Kong) Fok Pong Shing
- (Hong Kong) Wong Ping Chung
- (Indonesia) Agus Mulyadi
- (Indonesia) Agus Prima Aspa
- (Indonesia) Dedek Duha

== Regulation ==
The tournament followed Asian Games regulation with all participating teams will be using their U-23 national team with an advantage to use three senior players. It was decided through a round-robin format and team with the highest point would become the winner.

== Venue ==
The sole venue stadium was the Pakansari Stadium in Cibinong of Bogor Regency. Earlier, the PSSI also expected the Gelora Bung Karno Stadium in Jakarta to be used for the tournament, but the stadium was being renovated to host the upcoming 2018 Asian Games, where Indonesia became the host.

(Indonesia) Cibinong
Pakansari Stadium
Capacity: 30,000
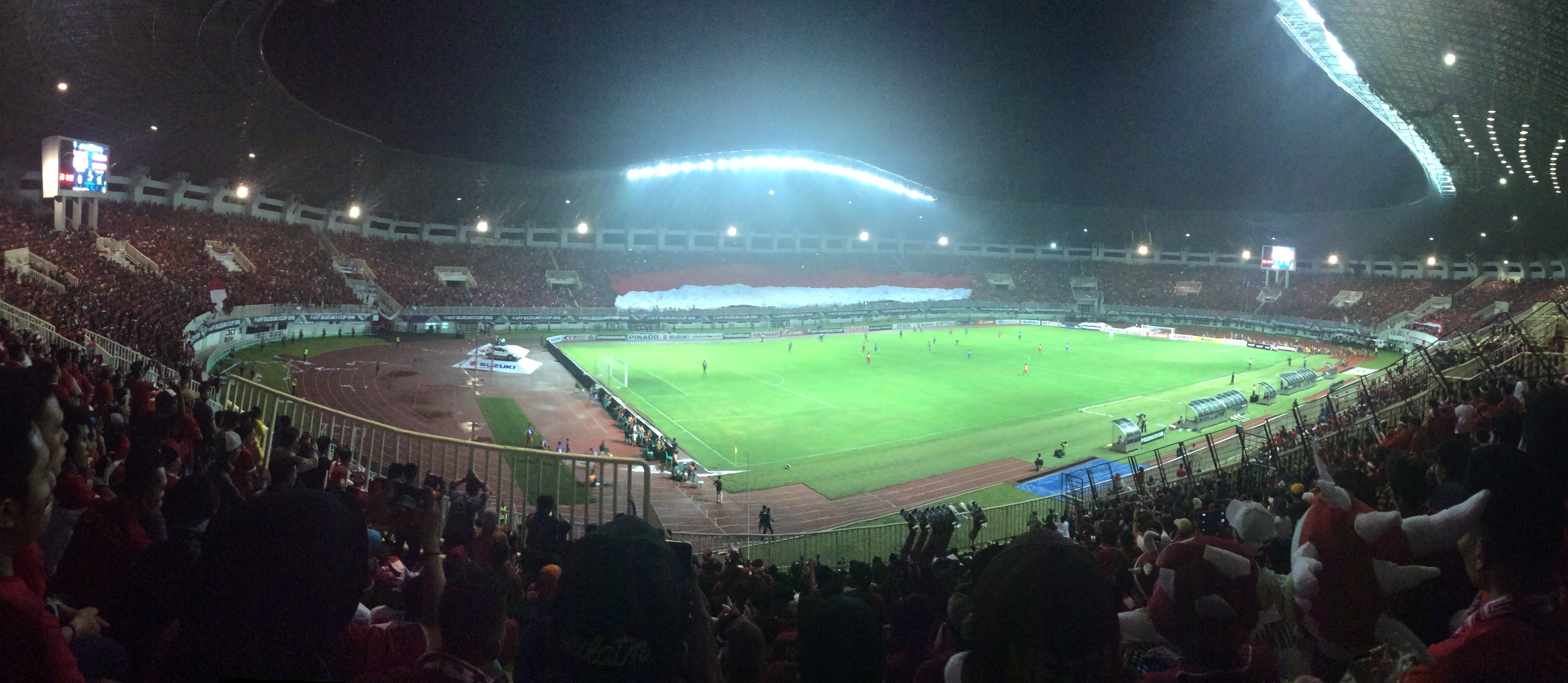

== Standings ==
Pos	Team	Pld	W	D	L	GF	GA	GD	Pts	Result
1	Bahrain	3	2	1	0	8	4	+4	7	Champion
2	Uzbekistan	3	0	3	0	5	5	0	3	Runner–up
3	Indonesia (H)	3	0	2	1	0	1	−1	2	Third place
4	North Korea	3	0	2	1	3	6	−3	2	

Source: Football Association of Indonesia
Rules for classification: 1) Points; 2) Head-to-head; 3) Goal difference; 4) Goals scored; 5) Fair-play points; 6) Penalty shoot-out
(H) Hosts

== Matches ==
- All matches played in Indonesia
- Times listed are local (UTC+7:00)
27 April 2018
16:00

Uzbekistan	2–2	North Korea
Alijonov 8'; Sidorov 25'	Report	Jo Sol-song 32', 86'

Pakansari Stadium, Cibinong
Referee: Mustafa Umarella (Indonesia)
27 April 2018
19:30

Indonesia	0–1	Bahrain
	Report	Marhoon 5'

Pakansari Stadium, Cibinong
Referee: Luk Kin Sun (Hong Kong)

30 April 2018
16:00

Bahrain	3–3	Uzbekistan
Hashim 35'; Marhoon 50', 59'	Report	Amonov 43'; Gafurov 72'; Kodirkulov 90+3'

Pakansari Stadium, Cibinong
Referee: Yudi Nurcahya (Indonesia)
30 April 2018
19:30

Indonesia	0–0	North Korea
	Report

Pakansari Stadium, Cibinong
Referee: Khoun Virak (Cambodia)

3 May 2018
16:00

North Korea	1–4	Bahrain
Song Kum-song 60'	Report	Sanad 15'; Jasim 52'; Al-Sherooqi 57', 75'

Pakansari Stadium, Cibinong
Referee: Mustafa Umarella (Indonesia)
3 May 2018
19:30

Indonesia	0–0	Uzbekistan
	Report

Pakansari Stadium, Cibinong
Referee: Luk Kin Sun (Hong Kong)

== Winners ==
2018 PSSI Anniversary Cup
(Bahrain)
Bahrain
First title

== Goalscorers ==
3 goals

- (Bahrain) Mohamed Marhoon

2 goals

- (Bahrain) Ahmed Al-Sherooqi
- (North Korea) Jo Sol-song

1 goal

- (Bahrain) Ahmed Sanad
- (Bahrain) Jasim Alsalma
- (Bahrain) Sayed Hashim Isa
- (North Korea) Song Kum-song
- (Uzbekistan) Khojiakbar Alijonov
- (Uzbekistan) Azibek Amonov
- (Uzbekistan) Husniddin Gafurov
- (Uzbekistan) Sanjar Kodirkulov
- (Uzbekistan) Andrey Sidorov
