= Indonesia national under-23 football team =

Indonesian football team

Indonesia U-23
- Nickname(s): Garuda Muda (The Young Garuda); Merah Putih (The Red and White)
- Association: PSSI (Football Association of Indonesia)
- Confederation: AFC (Asia)
- Sub-confederation: AFF (Southeast Asia)
- Head coach: John Herdman
- Captain: Ivar Jenner
- Most caps: Witan Sulaeman (39)
- Top scorer: Osvaldo Haay (11)
- Home stadium: Gelora Bung Karno Stadium
- FIFA code: IDN
First colours	Second colours

First international
- South Korea 5–0 Indonesia (Masan, South Korea; 24 March 1991)

Biggest win
- Indonesia 9–0 Brunei (Petaling Jaya, Malaysia; 11 September 2001); Indonesia 9–0 Chinese Taipei (Surakarta, Indonesia; 9 September 2023)

Biggest defeat
- South Korea 7–0 Indonesia (Seoul, South Korea; 29 May 1999)

AFC U-23 Asian Cup
- Appearances: 1 (first in 2024)
- Best result: Fourth place (2024)

Asian Games
- Appearances: 4 (first in 2006)
- Best result: Round of 16 (2014, 2018, 2022)

ASEAN U-23 Championship
- Appearances: 3 (first in 2019)
- Best result: Champions (2019)

SEA Games
- Appearances: 12 (first in 2001)
- Best result: Gold medal (2023)

The Indonesia national under-23 football team (Indonesia: Tim Nasional Sepak Bola Indonesia U-23) is considered to be the feeder team for the Indonesia national football team, represents Indonesia at football in the Olympic Games, Asian Games and SEA Games, as well as any other under-23 international football tournaments including the AFC U-23 Asian Cup. It is controlled by the Football Association of Indonesia (PSSI).

This team was founded when the Olympic football was changed to an under-23 competition, and is also managed as under-22 team while it doesn't play in major competitions.

== Kit ==
The kits used usually follow the senior team's kits. However, they sometimes used kits with different manufacturers. In 2006 Asian Games, they used Puma kits. For the 2018 Asian Games, 2021 Southeast Asian Games, 2022 Asian Games, and 2023 Southeast Asian Games, they will use Li-Ning kits after the Indonesian Olympic Committee reached full sponsorship agreement with the apparel. Li-Ning will manufacture all clothes used by all Indonesian athletes.

Kit manufacturer	Year
(Germany) Adidas	1991–1995
(Italy) Diadora	1995–1996
(Japan) Asics	1996–1997
(Germany) Adidas	1997–2000
(United States) Nike	2000–2002
(Germany) Adidas	2004–2006
(Germany) Puma	2006 (Note: Only for the 2006 Asian Games)
(United States) Nike	2007–2020
(China) Li-Ning (Note: Only for 2018 Asian Games, 2021 Southeast Asian Games, 2023 Southeast Asian Games and 2022 Asian Games)	2018, 2022, and 2023
(Indonesia) Mills	2020–2024 and 2025 (Note: Only for 2025 SEA Games)
(Indonesia) Erspo	2024–2026
(Spain) Kelme	2026–

== Media coverage ==
Indonesia team for Asian Cup finals tournament and qualifiers are broadcast by MNC Media (qualifiers through 2020 and in 2024 only; finals through 2024) and Emtek (qualifiers in 2022 only). Friendlies against other national teams are broadcast by various channels and friendlies against national clubs by Emtek. The SEA Games matches are aired on TVRI (from 2013), MNC Media (2011; from 2019) and Emtek (2013–2017). The Asian Games matches are aired on Emtek (2018) and MNC Media (2022). The play-off match for the 2024 Summer Olympics was aired on RCTI.

== Results and fixtures ==
The following is a list of match results in the last 12 months, as well as any future matches that have been scheduled.

Win Draw Loss Fixture

=== 2025 ===
8 December 2025 SEA Games	Philippines	1–0	Indonesia	Chiang Mai, Thailand
18:00 UTC+7	Banatao 45+2'	Report		Stadium: 700th Anniversary Stadium; Referee: Adel Al-Naqbi (United Arab Emirates)

12 December 2025 SEA Games	Indonesia	3–1	Myanmar	Chiang Mai, Thailand
18:00 UTC+7	Toni 45'; Raven 89', 90+5'	Report	Min Maw Oo 29'	Stadium: 700th Anniversary Stadium; Referee: Ammar Mahfoodh (Bahrain)

== Coaching staff ==
Position	Name
Head coach	John Herdman
Assistant coach	(England) Simon Grayson
Assistant coach	(England) Elliott Dickman
Assistant coach	(Canada) Steven Vitória
Assistant coach	(Indonesia) Nova Arianto
Goalkeeping coaches	(Slovakia) Andrej Kostolansky
Goalkeeping coaches	(South Africa) Damian van Rensburg
Head of performance	(Switzerland) César Meylan
Video analyst	(Indonesia) Dzikry Lazuardi
Sports scientist	(Indonesia) Valdano Wiriawanputra
Doctor	(Indonesia) Alfan Nur Asyhar
Physiotherapists	(Australia) Lachlan Fooks
Physiotherapists	(Republic of Ireland) James Gardiner
Physiotherapists	(Indonesia) Titus Argatama
Physiotherapists	(Indonesia) Firdausi Kahfi
Sports nutritionist	(Indonesia) Emilia Achmadi
Administrator	(Canada) Maeve Glass
Operations manager	(Indonesia) Ashfi Qamara
Kitman	(England) Ronnie Barrie

== Players ==
=== Current squads ===
The following 23 players were called up for 2025 SEA Games. On 3 December 2025, Marselino Ferdinan withdrew due to an injury and replaced by Rifqi Farandi.

Caps and goals as of 12 December 2025, after the match against Myanmar.

No.	Pos.	Player	Date of birth (age)	Caps	Goals	Club
1	GK	Cahya Supriadi	11 February 2003 (age 23)	7	0	(Football Association of Indonesia) PSIM Yogyakarta
22	GK	Daffa Fasya	7 May 2004 (age 22)	3	0	(Football Association of Indonesia) Garudayaksa
23	GK	Muhammad Ardiansyah	23 March 2003 (age 23)	5	0	(Football Association of Indonesia) PSM Makassar
2	DF	Muhammad Ferarri	21 June 2003 (age 23)	25	2	(Football Association of Indonesia) Bhayangkara Presisi Lampung
3	DF	Kakang Rudianto	22 August 2003 (age 23)	11	0	(Football Association of Indonesia) Persib Bandung
4	DF	Kadek Arel (vice-captain)	4 April 2005 (age 21)	20	0	(Football Association of Indonesia) Bali United
6	DF	Robi Darwis	2 August 2003 (age 23)	19	0	(Football Association of Indonesia) Arema
15	DF	Raka Cahyana	24 February 2004 (age 22)	4	0	(Football Association of Indonesia) PSIM Yogyakarta
16	DF	Dony Tri Pamungkas	11 January 2005 (age 21)	19	2	(Football Association of Indonesia) Persija Jakarta
19	DF	Dion Markx	29 June 2005 (age 21)	5	0	(Football Association of Indonesia) Persita Tangerang
20	DF	Frengky Missa	20 February 2004 (age 22)	16	0	(Football Association of Indonesia) Bhayangkara Presisi Lampung
5	MF	Ivar Jenner (captain)	10 January 2004 (age 22)	14	2	(Football Association of Indonesia) Dewa United Banten
7	MF	Zanadin Fariz	31 May 2004 (age 22)	5	1	(Football Association of Indonesia) Persik Kediri
8	MF	Rayhan Hannan	2 April 2004 (age 22)	15	2	(Football Association of Indonesia) Persija Jakarta
12	MF	Ananda Raehan	17 December 2003 (age 22)	14	0	(Football Association of Indonesia) PSM Makassar
13	MF	Rifqi Farandi	22 June 2004 (age 22)	1	0	(Football Association of Indonesia) Madura United
14	MF	Rivaldo Pakpahan	20 January 2003 (age 23)	5	0	(Football Association of Indonesia) Borneo Samarinda
18	MF	Toni Firmansyah	14 January 2005 (age 21)	11	1	(Football Association of Indonesia) Persebaya Surabaya
9	FW	Mauro Zijlstra	9 November 2004 (age 22)	4	1	(Football Association of Indonesia) Arema
10	FW	Rafael Struick	27 March 2003 (age 23)	17	5	(Football Association of Indonesia) Dewa United Banten
11	FW	Hokky Caraka	21 August 2004 (age 22)	17	1	(Football Association of Indonesia) Persita Tangerang
17	FW	Rahmat Arjuna	30 April 2004 (age 22)	12	0	(Football Association of Indonesia) Bali United
21	FW	Jens Raven	12 October 2005 (age 21)	12	9	(Football Association of Indonesia) Bali United

=== Recent call-ups ===
The following players have also been called up to the squad within the last 12 months.

Pos.	Player	Date of birth (age)	Caps	Goals	Club	Latest call-up
GK	Ikram Algiffari	6 June 2006 (age 20)	0	0	(Indonesia) Semen Padang	2025 SEA Games^{PRE}
DF	Alfharezzi Buffon	28 April 2006 (age 20)	6	0	(Indonesia) Dewa United Banten	2025 SEA Games^{PRE}
DF	Mikael Tata	10 May 2004 (age 22)	5	0	(Indonesia) Persebaya Surabaya	2025 SEA Games^{PRE}
DF	Brandon Scheunemann	9 March 2005 (age 21)	4	0	(Indonesia) Madura United	2025 SEA Games^{PRE}
MF	Marselino Ferdinan	9 September 2004 (age 22)	25	8	(England) Oxford United	2025 SEA Games^{INJ}
FW	Ricky Pratama	6 May 2003 (age 23)	6	0	(Indonesia) Persebaya Surabaya	2025 SEA Games^{PRE}
FW	Wigi Pratama	29 July 2004 (age 22)	2	0	(Indonesia) Deltras	2025 SEA Games^{PRE}
Notes: ^{PRE} = Preliminary squad; ^{SUS} = Suspended; ^{INJ} = Withdrew from the roster due to an injury; ^{UNF} = Withdrew from the roster due to unfit condition; ^{RET} = Retired from the national team; ^{WD} = Withdrew from the roster for non-injury related reasons

== Competitive record ==
=== Olympic Games ===
Olympic Games record										Qualification					
Year	Round	Position	Pld	W	D	L	GF	GA	Squad	GP	W	D	L	GF	GA
1900–1988	See Indonesia national team									See Indonesia national team					
(Spain) 1992	Did not qualify									6	1	2	3	6	10
(United States) 1996	Did not qualify									4	2	0	2	6	4
(Australia) 2000	Did not qualify									3	2	0	1	4	9
(Greece) 2004	Did not qualify									2	1	0	1	2	5
(China) 2008	Did not qualify									8	2	1	5	6	11
(United Kingdom) 2012	Did not qualify									2	0	0	2	1	4
(Brazil) 2016	Did not qualify									Via AFC U-23 Asian Cup					
(Japan) 2020	Did not qualify									Via AFC U-23 Asian Cup					
(France) 2024	Did not qualify									Via AFC U-23 Asian Cup					
(United States) 2028	To be determined									Via AFC U-23 Asian Cup					
(Australia) 2032	To be determined									Via AFC U-23 Asian Cup					
Total									—	28	8	3	14	25	43

=== AFC U-23 Asian Cup ===
AFC U-23 Asian Cup record										Qualification					
Year	Round	Position	Pld	W	D	L	GF	GA	Squad	GP	W	D	L	GF	GA
(Oman) 2013	Did not qualify									5	3	0	2	7	7
(Qatar) 2016	Did not qualify									3	2	0	1	7	4
(China) 2018	Did not qualify									3	1	1	1	7	3
(Thailand) 2020	Did not qualify									3	1	0	2	2	6
(Uzbekistan) 2022	Did not qualify									2	0	0	2	2	4
(Qatar) 2024	Fourth place	4th	6	2	1	3	8	9	Squad	2	2	0	0	11	0
(Saudi Arabia) 2026	Did not qualify									3	1	1	1	5	1
(Japan) 2028	To be determined									To be determined					
Total	Best: Fourth place	1/8	6	2	1	3	8	9	—	21	10	2	9	41	25

Other records
First match	Indonesia 0–2 Qatar (15 April 2024; Al Rayyan, Qatar)
Biggest win	Jordan 1–4 Indonesia (21 April 2024; Doha, Qatar)
Biggest defeat	Indonesia 0–2 Qatar (15 April 2024; Al Rayyan, Qatar); Indonesia 0–2 Uzbekistan (29 April 2024; Doha, Qatar)

=== Asian Games ===
Asian Games record
Year	Round	Position	Pld	W	D	L	GF	GA	Squad
1951–1998	See Indonesia national team								
(South Korea) 2002	Did not enter								
(Qatar) 2006	Group stage	27th	3	0	1	2	2	11	Squad
(China) 2010	Did not enter								
(South Korea) 2014	Round of 16	11th	4	2	0	2	12	10	Squad
(Indonesia) 2018	Round of 16	10th	5	3	1	1	13	5	Squad
(China) 2022	Round of 16	11th	4	1	0	3	2	4	Squad
(Japan) 2026	Did not qualify								
(Qatar) 2030	To be determined								
(Saudi Arabia) 2034	To be determined								
Total	Best: Round of 16	4/7	16	6	2	8	29	30	—

Other records
First match	Indonesia 0–6 Iraq (18 November 2006; Doha, Qatar)
Biggest win	Timor-Leste 0–7 Indonesia (15 September 2014; Goyang, South Korea)
Biggest defeat	Indonesia 0–6 Iraq (18 November 2006; Doha, Qatar); Indonesia 0–6 Thailand (22 September 2014; Incheon, South Korea)

=== ASEAN U-23 Championship ===
ASEAN U-23 Championship record
Year	Round	Position	Pld	W	D	L	GF	GA	Squad
(Thailand) 2005	Did not enter								
(Cambodia) 2019	Champions	1st	5	3	2	0	8	4	Squad
(Cambodia) 2022	Withdrew								
(Thailand) 2023	Runners-up	2nd	4	2	1	1	5	3	Squad
(Indonesia) 2025	Runners-up	2nd	5	2	2	1	10	2	Squad
Total	Best: Champions	3/5	14	7	5	2	23	9	—

Other records
First match	Myanmar 1–1 Indonesia (18 February 2019; Phnom Penh, Cambodia)
Biggest win	Indonesia 8–0 Brunei (15 July 2025; Jakarta, Indonesia)
Biggest defeat	Malaysia 2–1 Indonesia (18 August 2023; Rayong, Thailand); Vietnam 1–0 Indonesia (29 July 2025; Jakarta, Indonesia)

=== SEA Games ===
SEA Games record
Year	Round	Position	Pld	W	D	L	GF	GA	Squad
1959–1999	See Indonesia national team								
(Malaysia) 2001	Fourth place	4th	5	2	0	3	12	5	Squad
(Vietnam) 2003	Group stage	6th	3	1	0	2	1	7	Squad
(Philippines) 2005	Fourth place	4th	6	2	2	2	6	4	Squad
(Thailand) 2007	Group stage	6th	3	1	1	1	4	3	Squad
(Laos) 2009	Group stage	8th	3	0	1	2	3	7	Squad
(Indonesia) 2011	Silver medal	2nd	6	4	1	1	14	3	Squad
(Myanmar) 2013	Silver medal	2nd	6	2	2	2	4	6	Squad
(Singapore) 2015	Fourth place	4th	6	3	0	3	11	15	Squad
(Malaysia) 2017	Bronze medal	3rd	7	4	2	1	10	3	Squad
(Philippines) 2019	Silver medal	2nd	7	5	0	2	21	7	Squad
(Vietnam) 2021	Bronze medal	3rd	6	3	1	2	12	7	Squad
(Cambodia) 2023	Gold medal	1st	6	6	0	0	21	5	Squad
2025	Group stage	5th	2	1	0	1	3	2	Squad
(Malaysia) 2027	To be determined								
(Singapore) 2029	To be determined								
(Laos) 2031	To be determined								
(Philippines) 2033	To be determined								
Total	Best: Gold medal	13/13	66	34	10	22	122	74	—

Other records
First match	Indonesia 1–0 Vietnam (6 September 2001; Petaling Jaya, Malaysia)
Biggest win	Indonesia 9–0 Brunei (11 September 2001; Petaling Jaya, Malaysia)
Biggest defeat	Indonesia 0–6 Thailand (7 December 2003; Nam Định, Vietnam)

=== Islamic Solidarity Games ===
Islamic Solidarity Games record
Year	Round	Position	Pld	W	D	L	GF	GA	Squad
(Saudi Arabia) 2005	Did not enter								
(Indonesia) 2013	Silver medal	2nd	4	1	1	2	3	4	Squad
(Azerbaijan) 2017	Did not enter								
(Turkey) 2021	Did not enter								
Total	Best: Silver medal	1/4	4	1	1	2	3	4	—

== Head-to-head record ==
As of 12 December 2025, after the match against Myanmar.

Opponent	Pld	W	D	L	GF	GA	GD	Win %
Australia	3	1	0	2	3	4	−1	33.33
Bangladesh	1	0	1	0	2	2	+0	0.00
Brunei	5	5	0	0	29	1	+28	100.00
Cambodia	6	6	0	0	20	2	+18	100.00
China	1	0	0	1	0	2	−2	0.00
Chinese Taipei	6	4	0	2	18	6	+12	66.67
Guinea	1	0	0	1	0	1	−1	0.00
Hong Kong	6	4	2	0	13	4	+9	66.67
Hong Kong U-21	1	1	0	0	4	0	+4	100.00
India	2	0	1	1	2	3	−1	0.00
Iran	2	1	1	0	3	2	+1	50.00
Iraq	1	0	0	1	1	2	−1	0.00
Japan	2	0	0	2	2	5	−3	0.00
Jordan	1	1	0	0	4	1	+3	100.00
Kyrgyzstan	2	1	0	1	2	1	+1	50.00
Laos	7	4	1	2	14	5	+9	57.14
Lebanon	4	1	0	3	4	9	−5	25.00
Macau	1	1	0	0	5	0	+5	100.00
Malaysia	11	0	5	6	7	15	−8	0.00
Maldives	3	2	1	0	5	0	+5	66.67
Mali	2	0	1	1	2	5	−3	0.00
Mongolia	2	2	0	0	10	2	+8	100.00
Myanmar	11	4	4	3	16	14	+2	36.36
North Korea	3	1	0	2	8	5	+3	33.33
Oman	2	1	0	1	2	4	−2	50.00
Palestine	1	0	0	1	1	2	−1	0.00
Philippines	6	5	0	1	15	1	+14	83.33
Qatar	1	0	0	1	0	2	−2	0.00
Saudi Arabia	2	0	1	1	2	4	−2	0.00
Singapore	5	3	2	0	7	2	+5	60.00
Slovenia U-21	1	0	1	0	2	2	+0	0.00
South Korea	9	0	1	8	5	27	−22	0.00
Sri Lanka	1	1	0	0	2	1	+1	100.00
Thailand	20	4	5	11	18	42	−24	20.00
Timor-Leste	5	4	1	0	11	1	+10	80.00
Turkmenistan	3	1	0	2	3	4	−1	33.33
United Arab Emirates	2	1	1	0	3	2	+1	50.00
Uzbekistan	3	0	1	2	0	4	−4	0.00
Vietnam	16	4	1	11	7	21	−14	25.00
38 Countries	160	63	30	67	250	208	+42	39.38

== Honours ==
=== International ===
- Islamic Solidarity Games
  - Silver medal (1): 2013

=== Continental ===
- AFC U-23 Asian Cup
  - Fourth place (1): 2024

=== Regional ===
- ASEAN U-23 Championship
  - (gold) Champions (1): 2019
  - (silver) Runners-up (2): 2023, 2025
- SEA Games
  - Gold medal (1): 2023
  - Silver medal (3): 2011, 2013, 2019
  - Bronze medal (2): 2017, 2021
- ASEAN University Games
  - (gold) Champions (1): 2014
  - (bronze) Third Place (1):2008

=== Exhibition Tournaments ===
- Aga Khan Cup
  - (gold) Champions (1): 1966
- MNC Cup
  - (gold) Champions (1): 2013
- PSSI Anniversary Cup
  - (bronze) Third place (1): 2018
- Merlion Cup
  - (bronze) Third place (1): 2019
- 2019 Trofeo HB X Cup
  - (gold) Champions (1): 2019

== See also ==
- Indonesia national football team
- Indonesia women's national football team
- Indonesia national under-20 football team
- Indonesia national under-17 football team
- Indonesia women's national under-20 football team
- Indonesia women's national under-17 football team
