= 2025 ASEAN U-23 Championship =

Kejuaraan ASEAN U-23 2025

Tournament details
- Host country: Indonesia
- Dates: 15–29 July
- Teams: 10 (from 1 sub-confederation)
- Venues: 2 (in 2 host cities)

Final positions
- Champions: Vietnam (3rd title)
- Runners-up: Indonesia
- Third place: Thailand
- Fourth place: Philippines

Tournament statistics
- Matches played: 16
- Goals scored: 51 (3.19 per match)
- Top scorer(s): (Indonesia) Jens Raven (7 goals)
- Best player: (Vietnam) Nguyễn Đình Bắc
- Best goalkeeper: (Indonesia) Muhammad Ardiansyah

The 2025 ASEAN U-23 Championship (officially the ASEAN U-23 mandiri Cup 2025 for sponsorship reasons) was the 5th edition of the ASEAN U-23 Championship (previously known as the AFF U-23 Championship), the biennial international youth football championship organised by ASEAN Football Federation (AFF) for the men's under-23 national teams of Southeast Asia. The tournament was held in Indonesia from 15 to 29 July.

The two-time defending champions Vietnam defeated hosts Indonesia 1–0 in the final, thereby successfully defending their 2022 and 2023 title and winning their third title overall.

== Qualified teams ==
There was no qualification phase. The following teams, from 10 out of 12 member associations of the AFF, entered the tournament:

Team	Appearance	First appearance	Last appearance	Previous best performance
Brunei	3rd	2022	2023	Group stage (2022, 2023)
Cambodia	5th	2005	2023	Fourth place (2019)
Indonesia	3rd	2019	2023	Champions (2019)
Laos	4th	2005	2023	Third place (2022)
Malaysia	5th	2005	2023	Fourth place (2005, 2023)
Myanmar	4th	2005	2023	Third place (2005)
Philippines	5th	2005	2023	Group stage (2005, 2019, 2022, 2023)
Thailand	4th	2005	2023	Champions (2005)
Timor-Leste	5th	2005	2023	Third place (2022)
Vietnam	4th	2019	2023	Champions (2022, 2023)

Did not enter
Australia
Singapore

== Draw ==
The group stage draw was held on Bali, Indonesia at 10:00 local time (UTC+8).

Pot 1	Pot 2	Pot 3	Pot 4
1. Vietnam; 2. Indonesia (H); 3. Thailand	4. Malaysia; 5. Cambodia; 6. Myanmar	7. Philippines; 8. Laos; 9. Timor-Leste	10. Brunei

== Schedule ==
All matches were played from 15 to 29 July.

Stage(s)	Matchday	Group A	Date	Group B, C	Date
Group stage	Matchday 1	2 v 3, 1 v 4	15 July 2025	2 v 3	16 July 2025
Group stage	Matchday 2	4 v 2, 3 v 1	18 July 2025	3 v 1	19 July 2025
Group stage	Matchday 3	1 v 2, 3 v 4	21 July 2025	1 v 2	22 July 2025
Knockout stage	Round		Matches		Date
Knockout stage	Semi-finals				
Knockout stage	Semi-finals		B1 v C1/A2		25 July 2025
Knockout stage	Semi-finals		A1 v B3-C3/C1		25 July 2025
Knockout stage	Third place play-off		SF1 loser v SF2 loser		28 July 2025
Knockout stage	Final		SF1 winner v SF2 winner		29 July 2025

== Squads ==
Players born on or after 1 January 2002 are eligible to participate. Each national team had to submit a squad of 23 players, three of whom had to be goalkeepers. If a player was injured or ill severely enough to prevent his participation in the tournament before his team's first match, he could be replaced by another player.

== Match officials ==
- (Indonesia) Naufal Adya Fairuski
- (Indonesia) Ryan Nanda Saputra
- (Japan) Koji Takasaki
- (Saudi Arabia) Mohammed Sami Al-Ismail
- (Malaysia) Mohd Usaid Jamal
- (Singapore) Mohd Zulfiqar
- (Thailand) Pansa Chaisanit
- (Vietnam) Lê Vũ Linh
- (Vietnam) Nguyễn Mạnh Hải

== Venues ==
The tournament take place in two stadiums across northwestern part of Greater Jakarta.

Bekasi	Jakarta
Patriot Candrabhaga Stadium	Gelora Bung Karno Stadium
Capacity: 30,000	Capacity: 77,193
2025 ASEAN U-23 Championship is located in West Java

== Group stage ==
The group winners and the best runners-up advanced to the knockout stage, which began with the semi-finals.

All times are local, WIB (UTC+7).

=== Tiebreakers ===
The ranking of teams in the group stage was determined as follows:

1. Points obtained in all group matches;
2. Points in head-to-head matches among tied teams;
3. Goal difference in head-to-head matches among tied teams;
4. Goals scored in head-to-head matches among tied teams;
5. If more than two teams were tied, and after applying all head-to-head criteria above, a subset of teams were still tied, all head-to-head criteria above were reapplied exclusively to this subset of teams;
6. Goal difference in all group matches;
7. Goals scored in all group matches;
8. Penalty shoot-out if only two teams had the same number of points, and they met in the last round of the group and were tied after applying all criteria above (not used if more than two teams had the same number of points, or if their rankings were not relevant for qualification for the next stage);
9. Disciplinary points
  - Yellow card: −1 point;
  - Indirect red card (second yellow card): −3 points;
  - Direct red card: −3 points;
10. Drawing of lots.

=== Group A ===
Pos	Team	Pld	W	D	L	GF	GA	GD	Pts	Qualification
1	Indonesia (H)	3	2	1	0	9	0	+9	7	Advance to knockout stage
2	Philippines	3	2	0	1	4	1	+3	6	Advance to knockout stage
3	Malaysia	3	1	1	1	7	3	+4	4	
4	Brunei	3	0	0	3	1	17	−16	0	

Source: ASEAN United FC
Rules for classification: Group stage tiebreakers
(H) Hosts
15 July 2025
17:00

Malaysia	0–2	Philippines
	Report	Banatao 9', 40'

Gelora Bung Karno Stadium, Jakarta
Referee: Koji Takasaki (Japan)
15 July 2025
20:00

Indonesia	8–0	Brunei
Raven 2', 9', 31', 33', 41' (pen.), 62'; Arkhan 20'; Rayhan 35'	Report

Gelora Bung Karno Stadium, Jakarta
Attendance: 2,743
Referee: Mohd Zulfiqar (Singapore)

18 July 2025
17:00

Brunei	1–7	Malaysia
Haziq 74'	Report	Danish S. 3'; Nazry 4' (o.g.); Haykal 32'; Haqimi 42', 89'; Danish H. 69'; Tierney 76'

Gelora Bung Karno Stadium, Jakarta
Referee: Lê Vũ Linh (Vietnam)
18 July 2025
20:00

Philippines	0–1	Indonesia
	Report	Rosquillo 23' (o.g.)

Gelora Bung Karno Stadium, Jakarta
Attendance: 8,409
Referee: Mohammed Sami Al-Ismail (Saudi Arabia)

21 July 2025
20:00

Indonesia	0–0	Malaysia
	Report

Gelora Bung Karno Stadium, Jakarta
Attendance: 27,013
Referee: Koji Takasaki (Japan)
21 July 2025
20:00

Philippines	2–0	Brunei
Mariona 20' (pen.); Nuñez 85'	Report

Patriot Chandrabhaga Stadium, Bekasi
Referee: Pansa Chaisanit (Thailand)

=== Group B ===
Pos	Team	Pld	W	D	L	GF	GA	GD	Pts	Qualification
1	Vietnam	2	2	0	0	5	1	+4	6	Advance to knockout stage
2	Cambodia	2	0	1	1	2	3	−1	1	
3	Laos	2	0	1	1	1	4	−3	1	

Source: ASEAN United FC
Rules for classification: Group stage tiebreakers
16 July 2025
17:00

Cambodia	1–1	Laos
Sokha 57'	Report	Phousomboun 18'

Patriot Chandrabhaga Stadium, Bekasi
Referee: Ryan Nanda Saputra (Indonesia)

19 July 2025
17:00

Laos	0–3	Vietnam
	Report	Khuất Văn Khang 19'; Nguyễn Hiểu Minh 71', 84'

Patriot Chandrabhaga Stadium, Bekasi
Referee: Muhammad Usaid Jamal (Malaysia)

22 July 2025
20:00

Vietnam	2–1	Cambodia
Phạm Lý Đức 35'; Nguyễn Đình Bắc 85'	Report	Rado 62'

Gelora Bung Karno Stadium, Jakarta
Referee: Mohd Zulfiqar (Singapore)

=== Group C ===
Pos	Team	Pld	W	D	L	GF	GA	GD	Pts	Qualification
1	Thailand	2	1	1	0	4	0	+4	4	Advance to knockout stage
2	Myanmar	2	0	2	0	4	4	0	2	
3	Timor-Leste	2	0	1	1	4	8	−4	1	

Source: ASEAN United FC
Rules for classification: Group stage tiebreakers
16 July 2025
20:00

Myanmar	4–4	Timor-Leste
Shine Wanna Aung 13'; Zaw Win Thein 39' (pen.); Than Toe Aung 55'; Min Maw Oo 61'	Report	Zenivio 45+2'; Figo 53'; Canavaro 75'; Bakhito 90+2'

Patriot Chandrabhaga Stadium, Bekasi
Referee: Naufal Adya Fairuski (Indonesia)

19 July 2025
20:00

Timor-Leste	0–4	Thailand
	Report	Yotsakorn 14'; Thanawut 40'; Seksan 50'; Chawanwit 74'

Patriot Chandrabhaga Stadium, Bekasi
Referee: Nguyễn Mạnh Hải (Vietnam)

22 July 2025
20:00

Thailand	0–0	Myanmar
	Report

Patriot Chandrabhaga Stadium, Bekasi
Referee: Mohammed Sami Al-Ismail (Saudi Arabia)

=== Ranking of second-placed teams ===
Only one second-placed team will qualify for the semi-finals.

Result against fourth-placed team in Group A will not be considered for this ranking.

Pos	Grp	Team	Pld	W	D	L	GF	GA	GD	Pts	Qualification
1	A	Philippines	2	1	0	1	2	1	+1	3	Advance to knockout stage
2	C	Myanmar	2	0	2	0	4	4	0	2	
3	B	Cambodia	2	0	1	1	2	3	−1	1	

Source: ASEAN United FC
Rules for classification: 1) Points; 2) Goal difference; 3) Goals scored; 4) Wins; 5) Lower disciplinary points total; 6) Drawing of lots.

== Knockout stage ==
In the knockout stage, the penalty shoot-out was used to decide the winner if necessary.

=== Bracket ===
Semi-finals
25 July – Jakarta
Vietnam	2
Philippines	1
25 July – Jakarta
Indonesia (p)	1 (7)
Thailand	1 (6)

Final
29 July – Jakarta
Vietnam	1
Indonesia	0
Third place play-off
28 July – Jakarta
Philippines	1
Thailand	3

=== Semi-finals ===
25 July 2025
16:00

Vietnam	2–1	Philippines
Nguyễn Đình Bắc 41'; Nguyễn Xuân Bắc 54'	Report	Mariona 36'

Gelora Bung Karno Stadium, Jakarta
Referee: Mohd Usaid Jamal (Malaysia)
25 July 2025
20:00

Indonesia	1–1 (a.e.t.)	Thailand
Raven 84'	Report	Yotsakorn 60'
Penalties
Kadek (penalty scored); Kakang (penalty scored); Robi (penalty missed); Rayhan (penalty scored); Hokky (penalty scored); Yardan (penalty scored); Scheunemann (penalty scored); Alfharezzi (penalty scored)	7–6	(penalty missed) Pichitchai; (penalty scored) Thanawut; (penalty scored) Songkhramsamut; (penalty scored) Sphon; (penalty scored) Thanakrit; (penalty scored) Chawanwit; (penalty scored) Pattarapon; (penalty missed) Yotsakorn

Gelora Bung Karno Stadium, Jakarta
Attendance: 10,771
Referee: Mohammed Sami Al-Ismail (Saudi Arabia)

=== Third place play-off ===
28 July 2025
20:00

Philippines	1–3	Thailand
Banatao 79'	Report	Phanthamit 29'; Siraphop 74'; Seksan 86'

Gelora Bung Karno Stadium, Jakarta
Referee: Naufal Adya Fairuski (Indonesia)

=== Final ===
29 July 2025
20:00

Vietnam	1–0	Indonesia
Nguyễn Công Phương 37'	Report

Gelora Bung Karno Stadium, Jakarta
Attendance: 35,592
Referee: Koji Takasaki (Japan)

== Statistics ==
=== Goalscorers ===
There were 51 goals scored in 16 matches, for an average of 3.19 goals per match.

7 goals

- (Indonesia) Jens Raven

3 goals

- (Philippines) Otu Banatao

2 goals

- (Malaysia) Haqimi Azim
- (Vietnam) Nguyễn Hiểu Minh
- (Vietnam) Nguyễn Đình Bắc
- (Philippines) Javier Mariona
- (Thailand) Yotsakorn Burapha
- (Thailand) Seksan Ratree

1 goal

- (Indonesia) Arkhan Fikri
- (Indonesia) Rayhan Hannan
- (Laos) Phousomboun Panyavong
- (Cambodia) Phat Sokha
- (Cambodia) Mon Rado
- (Myanmar) Shine Wanna Aung
- (Myanmar) Zaw Win Thein
- (Myanmar) Than Toe Aung
- (Myanmar) Min Maw Oo
- (Timor-Leste) Zenivio
- (Timor-Leste) Luís Figo
- (Timor-Leste) Vabio Canavaro
- (Timor-Leste) Alexandro Bakhito
- (Malaysia) Danish Syamer
- (Malaysia) Haykal Danish
- (Malaysia) Danish Hakimi
- (Malaysia) Fergus Tierney
- (Philippines) Harry Nuñez
- (Brunei) Haziq Naqiuddin
- (Vietnam) Khuất Văn Khang
- (Vietnam) Phạm Lý Đức
- (Vietnam) Nguyễn Xuân Bắc
- (Vietnam) Nguyễn Công Phương
- (Thailand) Phanthamit Praphanth
- (Thailand) Siraphop Wandee
- (Thailand) Thanawut Phochai
- (Thailand) Chawanwit Saelao

1 own goal

- (Philippines) Jaime Rosquillo (against Indonesia)
- (Brunei) Nazry Aiman (against Malaysia)

=== Rising Star of the Tournament ===
The Adidas Rising Star of the Tournament award was given to the Philippines' Otu Banatao.

- (Philippines) Otu Banatao

=== Best Goalkeeper ===
The best goalkeeper award was given to Indonesia's Muhammad Ardiansyah.

- (Indonesia) Muhammad Ardiansyah

=== Top Goalscorer ===
The Yanmar Top Goalscorer award was given to Indonesia's Jens Raven, who scored 7 goals throughout the tournament including a double hat-trick against Brunei.

- (Indonesia) Jens Raven (7 goals)

=== Most Valuable Player ===
The Mandiri Most Valuable Player award was given to Vietnam's Nguyễn Đình Bắc.

- (Vietnam) Nguyễn Đình Bắc

=== Final ranking ===
Pos	Team	Pld	W	D	L	GF	GA	GD	Pts	Final result
1	Vietnam	4	4	0	0	8	2	+6	12	Champions
2	Indonesia	5	2	2	1	10	2	+8	8	Runners-up
3	Thailand	4	2	2	0	8	2	+6	8	Third place
4	Philippines	5	2	0	3	6	6	0	6	Fourth place
5	Malaysia	3	1	1	1	7	3	+4	4	Eliminated in group stage
6	Myanmar	2	0	2	0	4	4	0	2	Eliminated in group stage
7	Cambodia	2	0	1	1	2	3	−1	1	Eliminated in group stage
8	Laos	2	0	1	1	1	4	−3	1	Eliminated in group stage
9	Timor-Leste	2	0	1	1	4	8	−4	1	Eliminated in group stage
10	Brunei	3	0	0	3	1	17	−16	0	Eliminated in group stage

Source: ASEAN United FC

== Broadcasting rights ==
2025 ASEAN U-23 Championship television broadcasters in Southeast Asia
Country	Broadcaster	TV	Online	Ref.
Brunei	Bayon Television	—N/a	Youtube: BTV News; Facebook: BTV News	
Cambodia	Bayon Television	Bayon Television	Youtube: BTV News; Facebook: BTV News	
Indonesia	SCM	SCTV, Indosiar, Moji, Nex Parabola	Vidio	
Philippines	SCM	SCTV, Indosiar, Moji, Nex Parabola	Vidio	
Timor Leste	SCM	SCTV, Indosiar, Moji, Nex Parabola	Vidio	
Laos	BG Sports Co.	—N/a	BG SPORTS	
Malaysia	Astro	Astro Arena	—N/a	
Myanmar	Sky Net, BG Sports Co.	Sky Net Sports HD, Sky Net Sports 4	BG SPORTS	
Singapore	Mediacorp	—N/a	meWATCH	
Thailand	Triple V Broadcast Co., Ltd., BG Sports Co., AIS Play, TrueVisions	Thairath TV, True Sports 2, True Ball Thai 9	Youtube: Thairath Sport BG SPORTS; Facebook: Thairath Sport; Online Platforms: AIS Play, TrueVisions Now	
Vietnam	FPT, VTV	VTV5, VTV7, VTV Cần Thơ	FPT Play, VTVgo	
2025 ASEAN U-23 Championship international television broadcasters
South Korea	Eclat Media Group	SPOTV	SPOTV Now	
Rest of the World	YouTube	—N/a	ASEAN United FC	
