= ASEAN U-23 Championship =

Southeast Asian association football tournament for under-23 national teams

- Organiser(s): AFF
- Founded: 2005
- Region: Southeast Asia
- Teams: 12
- Current champions: Vietnam (3rd title)
- Most championships: Vietnam (3 titles)
- Website: aseanutdfc.com/asean-u23-championship
- 2025 ASEAN U-23 Championship

The ASEAN U-23 Championship (formerly AFF U-23 Championship) is an international football competition contested by the national under-23 teams of the member nations of the ASEAN Football Federation (AFF). The inaugural edition was held in 2005.

Vietnam are the most successful team in the tournament's history, having won three titles. They are also the current champions, having beaten Indonesia 1–0 in the 2025 final.

== Background ==
In 2005, the first edition was held in Bangkok, Thailand as the AFF U-23 Youth Championship. A second edition of the tournament was set to take place in Palembang, Indonesia between 16 and 26 July 2011 but was cancelled due to the main stadium of Gelora Sriwijaya Stadium, which was to be used for the tournament, still being under renovation.

In 2019, the tournament was then revived as the AFF U-22 Youth Championship with Phnom Penh, Cambodia as the host where it also served as a preparatory tournament for the Southeast Asian Games and AFC U-23 Asian Cup football tournament.

== Results ==
Ed.	Year	Hosts	Final			Losing semi-finalists (or third place match)			No. of teams
Ed.	Year	Hosts	Winners	Score	Runners-up	Third place	Score	Fourth place	No. of teams
1	2005; Details	Thailand	Thailand	3–0	Singapore	Myanmar	1–1 (4–2 p)	Malaysia	8
–	2011	Indonesia	Cancelled			Cancelled			
2	2019; Details	Cambodia	Indonesia	2–1	Thailand	Vietnam	1–0	Cambodia	8
3	2022; Details	Cambodia	Vietnam	1–0	Thailand	Timor-Leste and Laos (Note: Timor-Leste won by walkover as Laos were unable to play after several of their players tested positive for COVID-19 before the match. However both teams were declared as bronze medalists following a proposal by Timor Leste.) (Note: There was no designated fourth placing team after Laos was elevated as third placers with Timor-Leste. There were five other competing national teams for this tournament.)			9
4	2023; Details	Thailand	Vietnam	0–0 (a.e.t.) (6–5 p)	Indonesia	Thailand	0–0 (4–3 p)	Malaysia	10
5	2025; Details	Indonesia	Vietnam	1–0	Indonesia	Thailand	3–1	Philippines	10
6	2027; Details	Vietnam							

== Performance by countries ==
Team	Winners	Runners-up	Third place	Fourth place
Vietnam	3 (2022, 2023, 2025)		1 (2019)	
Thailand	1 (2005)	2 (2019, 2022)	2 (2023, 2025)	
Indonesia	1 (2019)	2 (2023, 2025)		
Singapore		1 (2005)		
Myanmar			1 (2005)	
Laos			1 (2022)	
Timor-Leste			1 (2022)	
Malaysia				2 (2005, 2023)
Cambodia				1 (2019)
Philippines				1 (2025)

== Comprehensive team results by tournament ==
Legend

- 1st – Champions
- 2nd – Runners-up
- 3rd – Third place
- 4th – Fourth place
- GS – Group stage
- q – Qualified/Entered/Participated for the next tournament
- – Hosts
- • – Did not qualify
- × – Did not enter
- ??? – Not confirmed
- × – Withdrew before qualification / banned

Team	(Thailand) 2005 (8)	(Cambodia) 2019 (8)	(Cambodia) 2022 (9)	(Thailand) 2023 (10)	(Indonesia) 2025 (10)	(Vietnam) 2027 (10)	Total
Australia		×	×	×	x	0	
Brunei	×	×	GS	GS	GS	q	4
Cambodia	GS	4th	GS	GS	GS	q	6
Indonesia	×	1st	×	2nd	2nd	q	4
Laos	GS	×	3rd	GS	GS	q	5
Malaysia	4th	GS	GS	4th	GS	q	6
Myanmar	3rd	GS	×	GS	GS	q	5
Philippines	GS	GS	GS	GS	4th	q	6
Singapore	2nd	×	GS	×	x	???	2
Thailand	1st	2nd	2nd	3rd	3rd	q	6
Timor-Leste	GS	GS	3rd	GS	GS	q	6
Vietnam	×	3rd	1st	1st	1st	q	5

== All-time ranking table ==
As of 29 July 2025

Rank	Team	Part	Pld	W	D	L	GF	GA	GD	Pts	Best finish
1	Thailand	5	23	14	5	4	52	12	+40	47	Champions (2005)
2	Vietnam	4	17	13	3	1	33	6	+28	42	Champions (2022, 2023, 2025)
3	Indonesia	3	14	7	5	2	23	9	+14	26	Champions (2019)
4	Malaysia	5	17	6	5	6	24	26	–2	23	Fourth place (2005, 2023)
5	Cambodia	5	16	5	3	8	20	24	–4	18	Fourth place (2019)
6	Myanmar	4	13	3	6	4	26	19	+7	15	Third place (2005)
7	Philippines	5	16	4	2	10	20	28	–8	14	Fourth place (2025)
8	Timor-Leste	5	14	3	3	8	14	34	–20	12	Third place (2022)
9	Laos	4	10	3	2	5	13	19	–6	11	Third place (2022)
10	Singapore	2	7	3	0	4	10	21	–11	9	Runners-up (2005)
11	Brunei	3	9	0	0	9	4	40	–36	0	Group stage (2 times)

== Awards ==
=== Overalls ===
Year	Best player	Top scorer(s)	Goals	Best goalkeeper	Fair play award
2005	Not awarded			Not awarded	
2019	Not awarded	(Indonesia) Marinus Wanewar (Thailand) Saringkan Promsupa (Vietnam) Trần Danh Trung	3	Not awarded	Cambodia
2022	(Laos) Bounphachan Bounkong	(Thailand) Teerasak Poeiphimai	3	(Cambodia) Hul Kimhuy	
2023	(Indonesia) Arkhan Fikri	(Malaysia) Alif Ikmalrizal (Vietnam) Đinh Xuân Tiến	3	(Vietnam) Quan Văn Chuẩn	
2025	(Vietnam) Nguyễn Đình Bắc	(Indonesia) Jens Raven	8	(Indonesia) Muhammad Ardiansyah	

=== Winning coaches ===
Year	Team	Coach
2005	Thailand	(Thailand) Charnwit Polcheewin
2019	Indonesia	(Indonesia) Indra Sjafri
2022	Vietnam	(Vietnam) Đinh Thế Nam
2023	Vietnam	(Vietnam) Hoàng Anh Tuấn
2025	Vietnam	(South Korea) Kim Sang-sik

== See also ==
- AFC U-23 Asian Cup
- ASEAN U-19 Boys' Championship
- ASEAN U-16 Boys' Championship
