= 2019 in Indonesian football =

Football in Indonesia
- Season: 2019

Men's football
- Liga 1: Bali United
- Liga 2: Persik
- Liga 3: Persijap
- Liga 1 Putri: Persib Putri
- Piala Indonesia: PSM

The 2019 season of competitive association football in Indonesia.

== Promotion and relegation ==
League	Promoted to league	Relegated from league
Liga 1	PSS; Semen Padang; Kalteng Putra	Mitra Kukar; Sriwijaya; PSMS
Liga 2	PSCS; Persik; PSGC; Persatu; Sulut United (formerly Bogor); Persewar	Persegres; Persik Kendal; Persika; Persiwa; PSIR; Semeru; PSMP (Disqualified)

== National teams ==
=== Men's national football team ===
13 March 2019 Friendly	Perth Glory Reserves (Australia)	1–3	Indonesia	Perth, Australia
	Hore 41'	Report	Rachmat 67', 81', 88'	Stadium: Litis Stadium

16 March 2019 Friendly	NPLWA State League 1 All Stars (Australia)	1–5	Indonesia	Perth, Australia
	Hurley 67' (pen.)	Report	Dutra 12'; Rachmat 15'; Febri 52'; Evan 78'; Sanadi 80'	Stadium: Hartfield Park, Forrestfield

20 March 2019 Friendly	Bali United (Indonesia)	1–1	Indonesia	Gianyar, Indonesia
16:30 UTC+8	Gunawan 16'	Report	Manahati 78' (pen.)	Stadium: Kapten I Wayan Dipta Stadium; Attendance: 0

25 March 2019 Int'l Friendly	Myanmar	0–2	Indonesia	Mandalay, Myanmar
18:30 UTC+7		Report	Greg 41'; Spasojević 85' (pen.)	Stadium: Mandalarthiri Stadium; Attendance: 32,000; Referee: Torpong Somsingha (Thailand)

11 June 2019 Int'l Friendly	Jordan	4–1	Indonesia	Amman, Jordan
20:00 UTC+7	Faisal 23'; Hamdouni 42'; Al-Rawashdeh 63'; Al-Dardour 79'	Report	Gonçalves 86' (pen.)	Stadium: Amman International Stadium; Attendance: 500; Referee: Maher Ali (Lebanon)

15 June 2019 Int'l Friendly	Indonesia	6–0	Vanuatu	Jakarta, Indonesia
18:30 UTC+7	Gonçalves 2', 48', 61', 65'; Evan 19', 74'	Report		Stadium: Gelora Bung Karno Stadium; Attendance: 8,086; Referee: Yudi Nurcahya (Indonesia)

25 August 2019 Friendly	Indonesia	4–0	(Indonesia) Persika	Cibinong, Indonesia
	Gonçalves 16'; Irfan 45'; Pellu 56'; Dutra 81'	Report		Stadium: Pakansari Stadium

28 August 2019 Friendly	Indonesia	2–0	(Indonesia) Bhayangkara	Cibinong, Indonesia
	Gonçalves 37' (pen.); Hanif 63'	Report		Stadium: Pakansari Stadium

14 November 2019 Friendly	PKNS U21s (Malaysia)	0–3	Indonesia	Petaling Jaya, Malaysia
15:00 UTC+7		Report	Septian 25'; Lerby 80', 85'	Stadium: PKNS Field

==== 2022 FIFA World Cup and 2023 AFC Asian Cup qualification ====
5 September 2019 Group G	Indonesia	2–3	Malaysia	Jakarta, Indonesia
19:30 UTC+7	Gonçalves 11', 38'	Report	Sumareh 36', 90+6'; Syafiq 65'	Stadium: Gelora Bung Karno Stadium; Attendance: 54,659; Referee: Ko Hyung-jin (South Korea)

10 September 2019 Group G	Indonesia	0–3	Thailand	Jakarta, Indonesia
19:30 UTC+7		Report	Sarachat 55', 71'; Bunmathan 63' (pen.)	Stadium: Gelora Bung Karno Stadium; Attendance: 11,600; Referee: Ma Ning (China)

10 October 2019 Group G	United Arab Emirates	5–0	Indonesia	Dubai, United Arab Emirates
23:00 UTC+7	Ibrahim 40'; Mabkhout 51', 63' (pen.), 72'; Hassan 90+3'	Report		Stadium: Al Maktoum Stadium; Attendance: 6,768; Referee: Adham Makhadmeh (Jordan)

15 October 2019 Group G	Indonesia	1–3	Vietnam	Gianyar, Indonesia
19:30 UTC+7	Bachdim 84'	Report	Đỗ Duy Mạnh 26'; Quế Ngọc Hải 55' (pen.); Nguyễn Tiến Linh 61'	Stadium: Kapten I Wayan Dipta Stadium; Attendance: 8,237; Referee: Turki Al-Khudhayr (Saudi Arabia)

19 November 2019 Group G	Malaysia	2–0	Indonesia	Kuala Lumpur, Malaysia
19:45 UTC+7	Safawi 30', 73'	Report		Stadium: Bukit Jalil National Stadium; Attendance: 75,044; Referee: Alireza Faghani (Iran)

=== Men's under-23 football team ===
6 February 2019 Friendly	Bhayangkara (Indonesia)	2–2	Indonesia	Bekasi, Indonesia
15:00 UTC+7	Armaiyn 75'; Mahir 85'	Report	Andy 61'; Zola 65' (pen.)	Stadium: Patriot Candrabhaga Stadium

10 February 2019 Friendly	Arema (Indonesia)	1–1	Indonesia	Malang, Indonesia
15:00 UTC+7	Gladiador 86'	Report	Hanif 74'	Stadium: Kanjuruhan Stadium; Referee: Djumadi Effendi (Indonesia)

12 February 2019 Friendly	Madura United (Indonesia)	1–1	Indonesia	Bangkalan, Indonesia
15:00 UTC+7	Slamet 40'	Report	Marinus 90+1'	Stadium: Gelora Bangkalan Stadium; Attendance: 7,433; Referee: Prasetyo Hadi (Indonesia)

12 March 2019 Friendly	Semen Padang (Indonesia)	2–2	Indonesia	Jakarta, Indonesia
15:45 UTC+7	Barthélémy,	Report	Osvaldo,	Stadium: Madya Stadium

17 March 2019 Friendly	Bali United (Indonesia)	0–3	Indonesia	Gianyar, Indonesia
16:00 UTC+7		Report	Zola 9'; Witan 55'; Walian 69'	Stadium: Kapten I Wayan Dipta Stadium; Referee: Wildan Albari (Indonesia)

2 June 2019 Friendly	PSIM (Indonesia)	0–0	Indonesia	Bantul, Indonesia
20:00 UTC+7		Report		Stadium: Sultan Agung Stadium; Referee: Fariq Hitaba (Indonesia)

7 June 2019 Merlion Cup SF	Thailand	2–1	Indonesia	Kallang, Singapore
15:00 UTC+7	Saringkan 6' (pen.); Ekanit 12'	Report	Witan 41'	Stadium: Jalan Besar Stadium; Referee: Gopala Letchman (Singapore)

9 June 2019 Merlion Cup 3rd place	Indonesia	5–0	Philippines	Kallang, Singapore
15:00 UTC+7	Rafli 5', 59', 67'; Rizky 47' (pen.); Asnawi 73'	Report		Stadium: Jalan Besar Stadium; Referee: Zulfiqar Mustaffa (Singapore)

14 June 2019 Friendly	Bali United (Indonesia)	0–0	Indonesia	Gianyar, Indonesia
18:30 UTC+7		Report		Stadium: Kapten I Wayan Dipta Stadium; Referee: Ali Mustofa (Indonesia)

28 July 2019 Friendly	Lampung (Indonesia)	0–2	Indonesia	Bandar Lampung, Indonesia
15:30 UTC+7		Report	Abimanyu 22'; Infantrie 42'	Stadium: Sumpah Pemuda Stadium

8 September 2019 Trofeo HB X	Bali United (Indonesia)	0–1	Indonesia	Yogyakarta, Indonesia
15:00 UTC+7		Report	Sani 18'	Stadium: Mandala Krida Stadium; Referee: Fariq Hitaba (Indonesia)
Note: Trofeo format

8 September 2019 Trofeo HB X	Indonesia	4–1	(Indonesia) PSIM	Yogyakarta, Indonesia
16:00 UTC+7	Bagas 22'; Rafli 27', 36', 45+2'	Report	Aditya 45+4' (pen.)	Stadium: Mandala Krida Stadium; Referee: Agus Fauzan (Indonesia)
Note: Trofeo format

11 October 2019 CFA Int'l Cup R1	Indonesia	0–2	China	Wuhan, China
18:00 UTC+7		Report	Tong Lei 57'; Firza 67' (o.g.)	Stadium: Wuhan Sports Center

13 October 2019 CFA Int'l Cup R1	Indonesia	0–1	Jordan	Wuhan, China
14:00 UTC+7		Report	Al-Naimat 48'	Stadium: Wuhan Sports Center

15 October 2019 CFA Int'l Cup R1	Saudi Arabia	1–1	Indonesia	Wuhan, China
14:00 UTC+7	Al-Selouli 10'	Report	Milla 14'	Stadium: Wuhan Sports Center

13 November 2019 Int'l Friendly	Indonesia	1–1	Iran	Gianyar, Indonesia
16:30 UTC+7	Rafli 10'	Report	Azadi 67'	Stadium: Kapten I Wayan Dipta Stadium; Referee: Yudi Nurcahya (Indonesia)

16 November 2019 Int'l Friendly	Indonesia	2–1	Iran	Cibinong, Indonesia
19:00 UTC+7	Rafli 32'; Egy 84'	Report	Shekari 37' (pen.)	Stadium: Pakansari Stadium

==== 2019 AFF U-22 Youth Championship ====
18 February 2019 Group B	Myanmar	1–1	Indonesia	Phnom Penh, Cambodia
15:30 UTC+7	Kaung Khant 13'	Report	Irianto 38'	Stadium: Phnom Penh Olympic Stadium; Attendance: 633; Referee: Sivakorn Pu-udom (Thailand)

20 February 2019 Group B	Indonesia	2–2	Malaysia	Phnom Penh, Cambodia
15:30 UTC+7	Marinus 53'; Witan 77'	Report	Akif 62'; Fayyadh 87'	Stadium: Phnom Penh Olympic Stadium; Attendance: 600; Referee: Steve Supresencia (Philippines)

22 February 2019 Group B	Indonesia	2–0	Cambodia	Phnom Penh, Cambodia
18:30 UTC+7	Marinus 19', 83'	Report		Stadium: Phnom Penh Olympic Stadium; Attendance: 8,318; Referee: Steve Supresencia (Philippines)

24 February 2019 Semi-finals	Vietnam	0–1	Indonesia	Phnom Penh, Cambodia
15:30 UTC+7		Report	Luthfi 69'	Stadium: Phnom Penh Olympic Stadium; Attendance: 5,150; Referee: Thant Zin Oo (Myanmar)

26 February 2019 Final	Indonesia	2–1	Thailand	Phnom Penh, Cambodia
18:30 UTC+7	Sani 59'; Osvaldo 64'		Saringkan 57'	Stadium: Phnom Penh Olympic Stadium; Referee: Nguyễn Hiền Triết (Vietnam)

==== 2020 AFC U-23 Championship qualification ====
22 March 2019 Group K	Thailand	4–0	Indonesia	Hanoi, Vietnam
17:00 UTC+7	Shinnaphat 21'; Supachai 50' (pen.), 71'; Supachok 74'	Report		Stadium: Mỹ Đình National Stadium; Attendance: 1,053; Referee: Sherzod Kasimov (Uzbekistan)

24 March 2019 Group K	Indonesia	0–1	Vietnam	Hanoi, Vietnam
20:00 UTC+7		Report	Triệu Việt Hưng 90+4'	Stadium: Mỹ Đình National Stadium; Attendance: 25,591; Referee: Saoud Al-Athbah (Qatar)

26 March 2019 Group K	Indonesia	2–1	Brunei	Hanoi, Vietnam
17:00 UTC+7	Dimas 31'; Raffi 78'	Report	Azim 85' (pen.)	Stadium: Mỹ Đình National Stadium; Attendance: 825; Referee: Bijan Heidari (Iran)

==== 2019 Southeast Asian Games ====
26 November 2019 Group B	Thailand	0–2	Indonesia	Manila, Philippines
15:00 UTC+7		Report	Egy 4'; Osvaldo 86'	Stadium: Rizal Memorial Stadium; Referee: Ismaeel Habib Ali (Bahrain)

28 November 2019 Group B	Indonesia	2–0	Singapore	Manila, Philippines
19:00 UTC+7	Osvaldo 64'; Asnawi 74'	Report		Stadium: Rizal Memorial Stadium; Referee: Majed Al-Shamrani (Saudi Arabia)

1 December 2019 Group B	Vietnam	2–1	Indonesia	Manila, Philippines
19:00 UTC+7	Nguyễn Thành Chung 64'; Nguyễn Hoàng Đức 90+1'	Report	Sani 23'	Stadium: Rizal Memorial Stadium; Referee: Majed Al-Shamrani (Saudi Arabia)

3 December 2019 Group B	Indonesia	8–0	Brunei	Biñan, Philippines
19:00 UTC+7	Osvaldo 11', 45+2', 72'; Egy 40', 80'; Saddil 50'; Witan 68'; Andy 77'	Report		Stadium: Biñan Football Stadium; Referee: Clifford Daypuyat (Philippines)

5 December 2019 Group B	Indonesia	4–0	Laos	Imus, Philippines
15:00 UTC+7	Saddil 4'; Osvaldo 47', 90+5'; Bagas 73' (pen.)	Report		Stadium: City of Imus Grandstand; Referee: Clifford Daypuyat (Philippines)

7 December 2019 Semi-finals	Myanmar	2–4 (a.e.t.)	Indonesia	Manila, Philippines
15:00 UTC+7	Aung Kaung Mann 79'; Win Naing Tun 80'	Report	Evan 57', 113'; Egy 72'; Osvaldo 102'	Stadium: Rizal Memorial Stadium; Referee: C. R. Srikrishna (India)

10 December 2019 Final	Indonesia	0–3	Vietnam	Manila, Philippines
19:00 UTC+7		Report	Đoàn Văn Hậu 39', 73'; Đỗ Hùng Dũng 59'	Stadium: Rizal Memorial Stadium; Referee: Majed Al-Shamrani (Saudi Arabia)

=== Men's under-19 football team ===
7 July 2019 Friendly	Indonesia	1–0	(Indonesia) Barito Putera U20s	Cikarang, Indonesia
15:00 UTC+7	Zico	Report		Stadium: Wibawa Mukti Stadium

8 July 2019 Friendly	Indonesia	0–1	(Indonesia) Bhayangkara U20s	Cikarang, Indonesia
08:00 UTC+7		Report	Yudista 69'	Stadium: Wibawa Mukti Stadium

15 July 2019 Friendly	Indonesia	4–1	(Indonesia) Persija U20s	Cikarang, Indonesia
15:00 UTC+7	Beckham; Fajar; Bagus,	Report	Anang	Stadium: Wibawa Mukti Stadium

18 July 2019 Friendly	Indonesia	2–1	(Indonesia) Persibo	Sidoarjo, Indonesia
15:00 UTC+7	Rendy 45' (pen.); Bagus 54'	Report	Ananda 71'	Stadium: Gelora Delta Stadium

20 July 2019 Friendly	Indonesia	1–0	(Indonesia) Deltras	Sidoarjo, Indonesia
19:00 UTC+7	Brylian 35'	Report		Stadium: Gelora Delta Stadium

22 July 2019 Friendly	Indonesia	4–0	(Indonesia) Persekabpas	Sidoarjo, Indonesia
15:00 UTC+7	Zico 15', 17'; Supriadi 35'; Rendy 47'	Report		Stadium: Gelora Delta Stadium

30 July 2019 Friendly	Indonesia	2–0	(Indonesia) Persikasi	Cikarang, Indonesia
15:30 UTC+7	Dewangga 19'; Figo 84'	Report		Stadium: Wibawa Mukti Stadium

7 September 2019 Int'l Friendly	Indonesia	2–4	Iran	Bekasi, Indonesia
15:30 UTC+7	Fajar 46'; Bagus 86'	Report	Salmani 15' (pen.); Sobhani 50'; Barzega 58'; Hashemnezhad 60'	Stadium: Patriot Chandrabhaga Stadium

11 September 2019 Int'l Friendly	Indonesia	1–0	Iran	Yogyakarta, Indonesia
15:30 UTC+7	Zico 48'	Report		Stadium: Mandala Krida Stadium

5 October 2019 Friendly	Indonesia	3–0	(Indonesia) Pra PON DKI Jakarta	Cibinong, Indonesia
	Zico; Braif; Imam	Report		Stadium: Pakansari Stadium

12 October 2019 Friendly	Indonesia	0–0	(Indonesia) TIRA-Persikabo	Cibinong, Indonesia
		Report		Stadium: Pakansari Stadium

17 October 2019 Int'l Friendly	Indonesia	3–1	China	Surabaya, Indonesia
19:30 UTC+7	Bagus 14'; Fajar 26'; Dewangga 36'	Report	Tao Qianglong 64' (pen.)	Stadium: Gelora Bung Tomo Stadium

20 October 2019 Int'l Friendly	Indonesia	1–3	China	Gianyar, Indonesia
18:30 UTC+7	Bagus 75'	Report	Tao Qianglong 7', 90+1'; Aisikaer 78'	Stadium: Kapten I Wayan Dipta Stadium

==== 2019 AFF U-18 Youth Championship ====
6 August 2019 Group A	Indonesia	7–1	Philippines	Thủ Dầu Một, Vietnam
15:30 UTC+7	Zico 3'; Fajar 15'; Bagus 16', 24'; David 43'; Supriadi 78', 90+1'	Report	Ambong 66'	Stadium: Bình Dương 2 Stadium; Attendance: 100; Referee: Mongkolchai Pechsri (Thailand)

8 August 2019 Group A	Indonesia	4–0	Timor-Leste	Thủ Dầu Một, Vietnam
16:00 UTC+7	David 9'; Salman 42'; Beckham 45+2' (pen.); Zico 80'	Report		Stadium: Gò Đậu Stadium; Attendance: 300; Referee: Wiwat Jumpaoon (Thailand)

10 August 2019 Group A	Brunei	1–6	Indonesia	Thủ Dầu Một, Vietnam
18:30 UTC+7	Hilmi 60'	Report	Bagus 8', 76'; Rendy 11' (pen.), 44'; Beckham 25'; Khairul 34'	Stadium: Gò Đậu Stadium; Attendance: 100; Referee: Ngô Duy Lân (Vietnam)

12 August 2019 Group A	Indonesia	2–1	Laos	Ho Chi Minh City, Vietnam
15:30 UTC+7	Bagus 72'; Anoulack 90+1' (o.g.)	Report	Alounnay 70'	Stadium: Thống Nhất Stadium; Attendance: 236; Referee: Lim Bunthoeun (Cambodia)

14 August 2019 Group A	Myanmar	1–1	Indonesia	Ho Chi Minh City, Vietnam
15:30 UTC+7	Hein Htet Aung 50'	Report	Rizky 68'	Stadium: Thống Nhất Stadium; Attendance: 122; Referee: Xaypaseuth Phongsanit (Laos)

17 August 2019 Semi-finals	Indonesia	3–4 (a.e.t.)	Malaysia	Thủ Dầu Một, Vietnam
16:30 UTC+7	Bagus 45'; Fajar 80'; Brylian 83'	Report	Aiman 19'; Luqman 54'; Harith 84' (pen.), 99'	Stadium: Gò Đậu Stadium; Attendance: 564; Referee: Mongkolchai Pechsri (Thailand)

19 August 2019 Third place	Indonesia	5–0	Myanmar	Ho Chi Minh City, Vietnam
16:30 UTC+7	Beckham 36', 44'; Supriadi 38', 40', 45+2'	Report		Stadium: Thống Nhất Stadium; Attendance: 275; Referee: Souei Vongkham (Laos)

==== 2020 AFC U-19 Championship qualification ====
6 November 2019 Group K	Indonesia	3–1	Timor-Leste	Jakarta, Indonesia
19:00 UTC+7	Fajar 3', 77'; Gumario 63' (o.g.)	Report	Mouzinho 52' (pen.)	Stadium: Madya Stadium; Attendance: 2,297; Referee: Heidari Payam (Iran)

8 November 2019 Group K	Hong Kong	0–4	Indonesia	Jakarta, Indonesia
19:00 UTC+7		Report	Bagas 24'; Fajar 30'; David 60'; Bagus 90+3' (pen.)	Stadium: Madya Stadium; Attendance: 3,233; Referee: Nasrullo Kabirov (Tajikistan)

10 November 2019 Group K	Indonesia	1–1	North Korea	Jakarta, Indonesia
19:00 UTC+7	Bagus 60' (pen.)	Report	Kim Kwang-chong 40'	Stadium: Gelora Bung Karno Stadium; Attendance: 16,291; Referee: Mahmood Al-Majarafi (Oman)

=== Men's under-16 football team ===
14 August 2019 Boys Elite Football Tournament	Myanmar	0–2	Indonesia	Mandalay, Myanmar
		Report	Diandra 26'; Athallah 68'	Stadium: Mandalarthiri Stadium

16 August 2019 Boys Elite Football Tournament	Montenegro	0–1	Indonesia	Mandalay, Myanmar
		Report	Wahyu 54'	Stadium: Mandalarthiri Stadium

18 August 2019 Boys Elite Football Tournament	Indonesia	1–1	South Korea	Mandalay, Myanmar
	Athallah 82'	Report	Jang Seok-hwan 89'	Stadium: Mandalarthiri Stadium

25 August 2019 Four Nations Tournament	Qatar	2–1	Indonesia	Doha, Qatar
16:00 UTC+7	Alqhareeb 31'; Al-Quraishi 73' (pen.)	Report	Athallah 56'	Stadium: Aspire Pitch 5

27 August 2019 Four Nations Tournament	Maldives	0–4	Indonesia	Doha, Qatar
14:00 UTC+7		Report	Wahyu 9', 89'; Daffa 10'; Marselino 73'	Stadium: Aspire Pitch 4

29 August 2019 Four Nations Tournament	Indonesia	2–0	Jordan	Doha, Qatar
14:00 UTC+7	Athallah 10'; Daffa 84'	Report		Stadium: Aspire Pitch 4

==== 2019 AFF U-15 Boys' Championship ====
27 July 2019 Group A	Vietnam	0–2	Indonesia	Chonburi, Thailand
15:00 UTC+7		Report	Valeron 40+2'; Marselino 46'	Stadium: IPE Chonburi Stadium 1 Attendance: 85; Referee: Abdul Hakim Mohd Haidi (Brunei)

29 July 2019 Group A	Indonesia	3–0	Singapore	Chonburi, Thailand
15:00 UTC+7	Marselino 18'; Wahyu 71'; Faizal 79'	Report		Stadium: IPE Chonburi Stadium 1 Attendance: 102; Referee: Khamsing Xaiyavongsy (Laos)

31 July 2019 Group A	Indonesia	1–1	Timor-Leste	Chonburi, Thailand
15:00 UTC+7	Marselino 45'	Report	Freitas 56'	Stadium: IPE Chonburi Stadium 1 Attendance: 50; Referee: Songkran Bunmeekiart (Thailand)

2 August 2019 Group A	Philippines	0–4	Indonesia	Chonburi, Thailand
15:00 UTC+7		Report	Marselino 25'; Wahyu 30'; Marcell 38' (pen.); Alexandro 65'	Stadium: IPE Chonburi Stadium 1 Attendance: 76; Referee: Torpong Somsing (Thailand)

4 August 2019 Group A	Indonesia	5–0	Myanmar	Chonburi, Thailand
15:00 UTC+7	Faizal 8', 42'; Marselino 31'; Ruy 56'; Valeron 80'	Report		Stadium: IPE Chonburi Stadium 1 Attendance: 85; Referee: Khoun Virak (Cambodia)

7 August 2019 Semi-finals	Indonesia	0–2	Thailand	Chonburi, Thailand
18:00 UTC+7		Report	Niphitphon 52', 70'	Stadium: IPE Chonburi Stadium 1 Attendance: 590; Referee: Khamsing Xaiyavongsy (Laos)

9 August 2019 Third place	Indonesia	0–0 (3–2 p)	Vietnam	Chonburi, Thailand
15:00 UTC+7		Report		Stadium: IPE Chonburi Stadium 1 Attendance: 85; Referee: Torpong Somsing (Thailand)
	Penalties
	Resa (penalty scored); Alfin (penalty missed); Marcell (penalty missed); Wahyu (penalty scored); Ahmad (penalty scored)		(penalty missed) Hà Văn Việt; (penalty scored) Nguyễn Văn Bảy; (penalty missed) Nguyễn Phú Nhã; (penalty scored) Nguyễn Đình Đức; (penalty missed) Nguyễn Công Sơn

==== 2020 AFC U-16 Championship qualification ====
16 September 2019 Group G	Philippines	0–4	Indonesia	Jakarta, Indonesia
19:00 UTC+7		Report	Athallah 37'; Marselino 46'; Alfin 57'; Wahyu 75'	Stadium: Madya Stadium; Attendance: 3,740; Referee: Abdulla Ali Al-Marri (Qatar)

18 September 2019 Group G	Indonesia	15–1	Northern Mariana Islands	Jakarta, Indonesia
19:00 UTC+7	Marselino 8', 51', 53' (pen.), 63', 90'; Daffa 15'; Athallah 16', 18', 26', 42'; Ruy 57', 73'; Wahyu P. 59', 78'; Mikael 87'	Report	Maniago 45+1'	Stadium: Madya Stadium; Attendance: 711; Referee: Feras Taweel (Syria)

20 September 2019 Group G	Brunei	0–8	Indonesia	Jakarta, Indonesia
19:00 UTC+7		Report	Athallah 15' (pen.); Daffa 43', 87'; Marselino 46' (pen.); Shaifullah 61', 68'; Ruy 63', 83'	Stadium: Madya Stadium; Attendance: 1,060; Referee: Abdulla Al-Marri (Qatar)

22 September 2019 Group G	Indonesia	0–0	China	Jakarta, Indonesia
19:00 UTC+7		Report		Stadium: Gelora Bung Karno Stadium; Attendance: 10,012; Referee: Sherzod Kasimov (Uzbekistan)

=== Women's national football team ===
27 January 2019 Int'l Friendly	Indonesia	0−3	India	Tangerang, Indonesia
15:30 UTC+7		Report	Ratanbala Devi 67', 70', 78'	Stadium: Benteng Taruna Stadium

30 January 2019 Int'l Friendly	Indonesia	0−2	India	Tangerang, Indonesia
		Report	Sanju Yadav 20'; Dangmei Grace 90+2'	Stadium: Benteng Taruna Stadium

16 November 2019 Int'l Friendly	Indonesia	5−0	Sri Lanka	Cibinong, Indonesia
20:00 UTC+7	Mayang 2', 62'; Nisma 4'; Baiq 31'; Safitri 74'	Report		Stadium: Pakansari Stadium

==== 2020 AFC Women's Olympic Qualifying Tournament (second round) ====
3 April 2019 2R Group A	India	2−0	Indonesia	Mandalay, Myanmar
15:30 UTC+7	Dangmei Grace 27', 68'	Report		Stadium: Mandalarthiri Stadium; Attendance: 100; Referee: Kim Yu-jeong (South Korea)

6 April 2019 2R Group A	Indonesia	0−6	Myanmar	Mandalay, Myanmar
18:30 UTC+7		Report	Khin Marlar Tun 2', 49'; Yee Yee Oo 19', 65', 74'; Win Theingi Tun 32'	Stadium: Mandalarthiri Stadium, Mandalay; Attendance: 755; Referee: Cha Min-ji (South Korea)

9 April 2019 2R Group A	Indonesia	1−2	Nepal	Mandalay, Myanmar
16:30 UTC+7	Amiatun 47'	Report	Bhandari 36', 89'	Stadium: Mandalarthiri Stadium, Mandalay; Attendance: 100; Referee: Cha Min-ji (South Korea)

==== 2019 AFF Women's Championship ====
16 August 2019 Group B	Myanmar	7–0	Indonesia	Chonburi, Thailand
15:00 UTC+7	Yee Yee Oo 3', 27', 90'; Khaing Thazin 17'; Khin Moe Wai 45+4'; Win Theingi Tun 66'; Khin Marlar Tun 76'	Report		Stadium: IPE Chonburi Stadium 1 Attendance: 45; Referee: Rita Gani (Malaysia)

18 August 2019 Group B	Indonesia	0–7	Vietnam	Chonburi, Thailand
15:00 UTC+7		Report	Nguyễn Thị Bích Thùy 1'; Huỳnh Như 19', 40', 43'; Phạm Hải Yến 22'; Nguyễn Thị Tuyết Dung 61', 63'	Stadium: IPE Chonburi Stadium 1 Attendance: 20; Referee: Rita Gani (Malaysia)

18 August 2019 Group B	Cambodia	0–4	Indonesia	Chonburi, Thailand
15:00 UTC+7		Report	Mayang 21'; Dewi 25', 90+1'; Amiatun 90+4'	Stadium: IPE Chonburi Stadium 1 Attendance: 20; Referee: Pansa Chaisanit (Thailand)

==== 2019 Southeast Asian Games ====
29 November 2019 Group B	Indonesia	0–6	Vietnam	Biñan, Philippines
15:00 UTC+7			Nguyễn Thị Tuyết Dung 9', 84'; Nguyễn Thị Vạn 14', 19'; Huỳnh Như 50', 61'	Stadium: Biñan Football Stadium

2 December 2019 Group B	Thailand	5–1	Indonesia	Manila, Philippines
15:00 UTC+7	Kanyanat 2', 18', 29'; Silawan 42'; Suchawadee 51'	Report	Rani 70'	Stadium: Rizal Memorial Stadium

== League season ==
=== Liga 1 ===
Pos	Team	Pld	W	D	L	GF	GA	GD	Pts	Qualification or relegation
1	Bali United (C)	34	19	7	8	48	35	+13	64	Qualification for the AFC Champions League preliminary round 1 and ASEAN Club Championship group stage
2	Persebaya (Note: Persebaya would have qualified for the AFC Cup group stage had Bali United qualified for the AFC Champions League group stage. As Bali United failed to qualify for the AFC Champions League group stage, Persebaya's qualification in the AFC Cup was annulled.)	34	14	12	8	57	43	+14	54	Qualification for the ASEAN Club Championship group stage
3	Persipura	34	14	11	9	47	38	+9	53 (Note: Head-to-head points: Persipura (+2) 9 pts; Bhayangkara (+2) 7 pts; Madura United (–4) 1 pts.)	
4	Bhayangkara	34	14	11	9	51	43	+8	53	
5	Madura United	34	15	8	11	55	44	+11	53	
6	Persib	34	13	12	9	49	39	+10	51 (Note: Head-to-head results: Persib 2–2 Borneo; Borneo 0–1 Persib.)	
7	Borneo	34	12	15	7	55	42	+13	51	
8	PSS	34	12	12	10	45	42	+3	48	
9	Arema	34	13	7	14	59	62	−3	46	
10	Persija	34	11	11	12	43	42	+1	44 (Note: Head-to-head points: Persija (+2) 8 pts; Persela (+0) 4 pts; PSM (–2) 4 pts.)	
11	Persela	34	11	11	12	47	45	+2	44	
12	PSM	34	13	5	16	50	50	0	44	Qualification for the AFC Cup play-off round (Note: PSM qualified for the AFC Cup play-off round as the 2018–19 Piala Indonesia winners.)
13	Barito Putera	34	11	10	13	45	51	−6	43 (Note: Head-to-head results: PSIS 0–0 Barito Putera; Barito Putera 2–0 PSIS.)	
14	PSIS	34	12	7	15	36	41	−5	43	
15	TIRA-Persikabo	34	10	12	12	51	57	−6	42	
16	Badak Lampung (R)	34	8	9	17	35	65	−30	33	Relegation to Liga 2
17	Semen Padang (R)	34	7	11	16	32	45	−13	32	Relegation to Liga 2
18	Kalteng Putra (R)	34	8	7	19	33	54	−21	31	Relegation to Liga 2

Source: Shopee Liga 1 2019, Soccerway
Rules for classification: 1) Points; 2) Head-to-head; 3) Goal difference; 4) Goals scored; 5) Drawing.
(C) Champions; (R) Relegated

=== Liga 2 ===
First round

West Region

Pos	Team	Pld	Pts
1	Persiraja (P)	22	42
2	Persita (P)	22	42
3	Sriwijaya	22	40
4	PSMS	22	37
5	PSCS	22	36
6	Perserang	22	33
7	Cilegon United	22	31
8	Babel United	22	30
9	PSPS Riau	22	26
10	PSGC (R)	22	19
11	Persibat (R)	22	16
12	Bandung United (R)	22	12

Source: Standings Liga 2 Group Barat
(P) Promoted;
(R) Relegated
East Region

Pos	Team	Pld	Pts
1	Persik (C, P)	20	33
2	Persewar	20	31
3	Martapura	20	31
4	Mitra Kukar	20	30
5	Persis	20	30
6	Sulut United	20	29
7	PSIM	20	27
8	Persiba	20	27
9	PSBS	20	24
10	Madura (R)	20	23
11	Persatu (R)	20	20

Source: Standings Liga 2 Group Timur
(C) Champions;
(P) Promoted;
(R) Relegated

Second round

Group X

Pos	Team	Pld	Pts
1	Persiraja	3	5
2	Sriwijaya	3	5
3	Persewar	3	2
4	Mitra Kukar	3	2

Source: Standings Liga 2 Group X
Group Y

Pos	Team	Pld	Pts
1	Persita	3	6
2	Persik	3	5
3	PSMS	3	4
4	Martapura	3	1

Source: Standings Liga 2 Group Y

Knockout round

Semi-finals
22 November – Gianyar
Sriwijaya	0 (2)
Persita (pen.)	0 (3)
22 November – Gianyar
Persik (pen.)	0 (5)
Persiraja	0 (4)

Final
25 November – Gianyar
Persita	2
Persik	3
Third place
25 November – Gianyar
Sriwijaya	0
Persiraja	1

Final

25 November 2019
20:00

Persita	2–3	Persik
M. Roby 24'; S. Arvani 38'	Report	R. Prahalabenta 11'; S. Wijaya 14'; W.S. Fanosa 90+1'

Kapten I Wayan Dipta Stadium, Gianyar
Attendance: 3,656
Referee: Sance Lawita

=== Liga 3 ===
First round

Group A
Pos	Team	Pld	Pts
1	Tiga Naga (H)	3	5
2	Karo United	3	5
3	Persikota	3	2
4	Tornado	3	2

Source: PSSI
(H) Hosts

Group B
Pos	Team	Pld	Pts
1	Persidi	3	7
2	757 Kepri Jaya	3	4
3	PSBL	3	2
4	Persibri	3	2

Source: PSSI

Group C
Pos	Team	Pld	Pts
1	Persekat	3	6
2	PSKC (H)	3	6
3	Persibas	3	6
4	Persitas	3	0

Source: PSSI
(H) Hosts

Group D
Pos	Team	Pld	Pts
1	Persinga	3	7
2	Sleman United	3	6
3	PS Protaba	3	2
4	Persiba Bantul (H)	3	1

Source: PSSI
(H) Hosts

Group E
Pos	Team	Pld	Pts
1	Persijap (H)	3	6
2	Perseden	3	6
3	Persidago	3	4
4	PS Matra	3	1

Source: PSSI
(H) Hosts

Group F
Pos	Team	Pld	Pts
1	Putra Sinar Giri (H)	3	7
2	PSIL	3	3
3	Gaspa 1958	3	2
4	PSN	3	1

Source: PSSI
(H) Hosts

Group G
Pos	Team	Pld	Pts
1	Semeru (H)	3	7
2	Persedikab	3	4
3	Persiter	3	3
4	PS Tarakan Banten Jaya	3	1

Source: PSSI
(H) Hosts

Group H
Pos	Team	Pld	Pts
1	Perseta (H)	3	7
2	Persemi	3	6
3	PSID	3	2
4	Bontang City	3	1

Source: PSSI
(H) Hosts

Second round

19 December 2019
Tiga Naga	1–0	757 Kepri Jaya	Tumpal Sinaga Stadium, Pekanbaru
Persidi	0–0 (4–3 p)	Karo United	Haji Agus Salim Stadium, Padang
Persekat	1–0 (a.e.t.)	Sleman United	Siliwangi Stadium, Bandung
Persinga	1–2	PSKC	Sultan Agung Stadium, Bantul
Persijap	4–1	PSIL	Gelora Bumi Kartini Stadium, Jepara
Putra Sinar Giri	2–2 (4–2 p)	Perseden	Gelora Joko Samudro Stadium, Gresik
Semeru	3–0	Persemi	Gelora Supriyadi Stadium, Blitar
Perseta	2–0	Persedikab	Rejoagung Stadium, Tulungagung Regency

Third round

West group
Pos	Team	Pld	Pts
1	PSKC (H, P)	3	7
2	Tiga Naga (P)	3	6
3	Persekat (P)	3	3
4	Persidi	3	1

Source: PSSI
(H) Hosts;
(P) Promoted

East group
Pos	Team	Pld	Pts
1	Persijap (C, P)	3	9
2	Putra Sinar Giri (H, P)	3	4
3	Semeru (P)	3	2
4	Perseta	3	1

Source: PSSI
(C) Champions;
(H) Hosts;
(P) Promoted

Final

=== Liga 1 Putri ===
Group stage

Group A

Pos	Team	Pld	Pts
1	Persib Putri	16	34
2	TIRA-Persikabo Kartini	16	31
3	Persija Putri	16	21
4	PSS Putri	16	14
5	PSIS Putri	16	11

Source: PSSI
Group B

Pos	Team	Pld	Pts
1	Galanita Persipura	16	43
2	Arema Putri	16	34
3	Bali United Women	16	18
4	Persebaya Putri	16	12
5	PSM Putri	16	10

Source: PSSI

Knockout stage

Semi-finals
A1	Persib Putri	2	0	2
B2	Arema Putri	0	0	0
A2	TIRA-Persikabo Kartini	4	3	7
B1	Galanita Persipura	5	0	5

Finals
A1	Persib Putri	3	3	6
A2	TIRA-Persikabo Kartini	0	1	1

== Domestic Cups ==
=== Piala Indonesia ===
Finals

21 July 2019
15:30

Persija	1–0	PSM
Ryuji 87'	Report

Gelora Bung Karno Stadium, Jakarta
Attendance: 70,306
Referee: Dwi Purba
6 August 2019 (Note: The PSM v Persija match, originally scheduled on 28 July 2019, 15:30 UTC+7, was postponed to 8 August 2019 due to an attack on the Persija team bus when several players and officials were injured.)
15:30

PSM	2–0	Persija
Evans 3'; Zulham 49'	Report

Andi Mattalata Stadium, Makassar
Attendance: 14,997
Referee: Fariq Hitaba

PSM won 2–1 on aggregate.

== AFC Competitions ==
=== AFC Champions League ===
==== Qualifying play-offs ====
===== Preliminary round 1 =====
Team 1	Score	Team 2
Home United (Singapore)	1–3	(Indonesia) Persija Jakarta

===== Preliminary round 2 =====
Team 1	Score	Team 2
Newcastle Jets (Australia)	3–1 (a.e.t.)	(Indonesia) Persija Jakarta

=== AFC Cup ===
==== Group stage ====
===== Group G =====
Pos	Team	Pld	W	D	L	GF	GA	GD	Pts	Qualification	CER	BBD	PSJ	SHA
1	(Philippines) Ceres–Negros	6	5	0	1	15	6	+9	15	Zonal semi-finals	—	0–1	1–0	3–2
2	(Vietnam) Becamex Bình Dương	6	4	1	1	13	5	+8	13	Zonal semi-finals	1–3	—	3–1	6–0
3	(Indonesia) Persija Jakarta	6	2	1	3	12	9	+3	7		2–3	0–0	—	6–1
4	(Myanmar) Shan United	6	0	0	6	5	25	−20	0		0–5	1–2	1–3	—

Source: AFC

===== Group H =====
Pos	Team	Pld	W	D	L	GF	GA	GD	Pts	Qualification	PSM	HOM	KAY	LAO
1	(Indonesia) PSM Makassar	6	4	2	0	17	8	+9	14	Zonal semi-finals	—	3–2	1–1	7–3
2	(Singapore) Home United	6	3	1	2	9	11	−2	10		1–1	—	2–0	1–0
3	(Philippines) Kaya–Iloilo	6	2	2	2	13	7	+6	8		1–2	5–0	—	5–1
4	(Laos) Lao Toyota	6	0	1	5	7	20	−13	1		0–3	2–3	1–1	—

Source: AFC

==== Knockout stage ====
===== Zonal semi-finals =====
Team 1	Agg.	Team 2	1st leg	2nd leg
Becamex Binh Dương (Vietnam)	2–2	(Indonesia) PSM Makassar	1–0	1–2
