= List of women's football clubs in Indonesia =

This is a list of football clubs in Indonesia. Currently the governing body of football in Indonesia is the PSSI.

In Indonesia, there is only one women's football league: the Liga 1 Putri. Thus, there are no promotions or relegation to date.

== Indonesia Women's League ==
Club	City / Regency	Province
Bekasi City	Bekasi	West Java
Dewa United Banten Women	Serang	Banten
Garudayaksa Women	Bogor	West Java
Persija Jakarta Women	Jakarta	Jakarta
Persikad Depok Women	Depok	West Java
Persita Tangerang Women	Tangerang	Banten

== Defuncts ==
Club	City / Regency	Province
Arema Putri	Malang	East Java
Bali United Women	Gianyar	Bali
Galanita Persipura	Tolikara	Papua
Persebaya Putri	Surabaya	East Java
Persib Putri	Bandung	West Java
PSIS Putri	Semarang	Central Java
PSM Putri	Makassar	South Sulawesi
PSS Putri	Sleman	Yogyakarta
TIRA-Persikabo Kartini	Bogor Regency	West Java

== See also ==
- List of football clubs in Indonesia
- Indonesia national football team
- Indonesian football league system
