= Pertiwi =

Pertiwi may refer to

- Pertiwi (surname)
- Ibu Pertiwi, a national personification of Indonesia
- Ibu Pertiwi (song), an Indonesian patriotic song of the 1950s-1960s
- Pertiwi Cup, a women's football competition in Indonesia
  - 2014 Pertiwi Cup
- Purna Bhakti Pertiwi Museum in Indonesia
- Yayasan Kemanusiaan Ibu Pertiwi, an Indonesian non-profit organisation

== See also ==
- Prithvi (disambiguation)
