= 2024 AFC U-17 Women's Asian Cup squads =

The following is a list of squads for each national team competing at the 2024 AFC U-17 Women's Asian Cup. The tournament is taking place in Indonesia, between 6–19 May 2024. It is the 9th edition of the international youth football championship organised by the Asian Football Confederation for the women's under-17 national teams of Asia.

Players born between 1 January 2007 and 31 December 2009 are eligible to compete in the tournament. Each team must register a squad of minimum 18 players and maximum 23 players, minimum three of whom must be goalkeepers (regulation articles 22.1 and 26.3). The full squad listings are below.

The age listed for each player is their age as of 6 May 2024, the first day of the tournament. The numbers of caps and goals listed for each player do not include any matches played after the start of the tournament. The club listed is the club for which the player last played a competitive match prior to the tournament. The nationality for each club reflects the national association (not the league) to which the club is affiliated. A flag is included for coaches who are of a different nationality than their team.

== Group A ==
=== Indonesia ===
Coach: (Japan) Satoru Mochizuki

The final squad was announced on 4 May 2024.

No.	Pos.	Player	Date of birth (age)	Club
1	GK	Gadhiza Asnanza	3 March 2008 (aged 16)	(Indonesia) Persib Putri
2	DF	Rizka Dwi Juniar	1 July 2007 (aged 16)	(Indonesia) Central Java
3	DF	Amelia Heselo	3 June 2007 (aged 16)	(Indonesia) Papua
4	DF	Nabila Divany	22 October 2007 (aged 16)	(Indonesia) Lampung
5	DF	Wandha Azzahra	27 October 2007 (aged 16)	(Indonesia) Persib Putri
6	MF	Zaira Kusuma	20 February 2007 (aged 17)	(Indonesia) DKI Jakarta
7	MF	Allya Putri	8 January 2008 (aged 16)	(Indonesia) Bangka Belitung
8	MF	Adelia Ramadany	27 November 2007 (aged 16)	(Indonesia) East Java
9	FW	Mayzura Alifa	25 May 2007 (aged 16)	(Indonesia) West Java
10	FW	Keyssya Anatassya	17 June 2008 (aged 15)	(Indonesia) DKI Jakarta
11	MF	Syafia Chorlienka	25 October 2009 (aged 14)	(Indonesia) Arema Putri
12	DF	Sofia Soll	23 January 2007 (aged 17)	(Indonesia) Highland Papua
13	FW	Claudia Scheunemann	24 April 2009 (aged 15)	(Indonesia) Banten
14	DF	Indira Jenna	14 February 2007 (aged 17)	(Indonesia) Banten
15	FW	Kikka Putri	13 September 2008 (aged 15)	(Indonesia) Central Kalimantan
16	DF	Zaskia Azzahra	16 October 2007 (aged 16)	(Indonesia) East Kalimantan
17	DF	Nanda Rahmawati	30 June 2007 (aged 16)	(Indonesia) West Java
18	MF	Zahra Nafisa	30 August 2008 (aged 15)	(Indonesia) Persib Putri
19	MF	Aulia Arifah	21 March 2008 (aged 16)	(Indonesia) Banten
20	GK	Fairus Khalisa	24 November 2009 (aged 14)	(Indonesia) Central Java
21	MF	Nabila Saputri	4 February 2007 (aged 17)	(Indonesia) Banten
22	DF	Sola Mananohas	28 August 2007 (aged 16)	(Indonesia) North Sulawesi
23	GK	Edelweiz Auradiva	9 March 2009 (aged 15)	(Indonesia) Borneo Putri

=== North Korea ===
Coach: Song Sung-gwon

No.	Pos.	Player	Date of birth (age)	Club
1	GK	Pak Ju-gyong	7 November 2007 (aged 16)	(North Korea) Naegohyang SC
2	DF	Choe Chong-gum	15 September 2007 (aged 16)	(North Korea) April 25
3	DF	Jong Pok-yong	20 January 2007 (aged 17)	(North Korea) April 25
4	MF	Hong Son-gyong	11 January 2007 (aged 17)	(North Korea) Pyongyang
5	DF	Ri Ye-gyong	10 November 2007 (aged 16)	(North Korea) April 25
6	MF	Jo Un-bom	7 April 2007 (aged 17)	(North Korea) Naegohyang SC
7	MF	Jon Il-chong	12 March 2007 (aged 17)	(North Korea) Amrogang
8	MF	So Ryu-yong	10 November 2007 (aged 16)	(North Korea) Amrogang
9	FW	Ri Su-jong	7 January 2007 (aged 17)	(North Korea) Naegohyang SC
10	FW	Ho Kyong	28 February 2007 (aged 17)	(North Korea) Sobaekus
11	MF	Choe Rim-jong	27 January 2007 (aged 17)	(North Korea) Amrogang
12	FW	Kang Ryu-mi	20 September 2007 (aged 16)	(North Korea) Rimyongsu
13	MF	Choe Yon-a	1 January 2007 (aged 17)	(North Korea) Naegohyang SC
14	DF	Pak Il-sim	20 May 2007 (aged 16)	(North Korea) Amrogang
15	FW	Choe Il-son	1 January 2007 (aged 17)	(North Korea) April 25
16	DF	Ri Pom	3 March 2007 (aged 17)	(North Korea) Naegohyang SC
17	DF	Ri Kuk-hyang	7 October 2007 (aged 16)	(North Korea) Naegohyang SC
18	GK	Choe Kyong-mi	17 July 2007 (aged 16)	(North Korea) Amrogang
19	MF	Ro Un-hyang	18 May 2007 (aged 16)	(North Korea) Naegohyang SC
20	MF	An Kyong-yong	27 August 2007 (aged 16)	(North Korea) April 25
21	FW	Son Jo-ye	26 July 2007 (aged 16)	(North Korea) Sobaekus
22	DF	Hong Sin-jong	20 August 2007 (aged 16)	(North Korea) Naegohyang SC
23	GK	Hong Ryu-mi	2 June 2009 (aged 14)	(North Korea) Sobaekus

=== Philippines ===
Coach: (Australia) Sinisa Cohadzic

The final squad was announced on 4 May 2024.

No.	Pos.	Player	Date of birth (age)	Club
1	GK	Gabrielle Baker	10 May 2007 (aged 16)	(United States) PDA
2	FW	Nina Mathelus	12 September 2008 (aged 15)	(United States) Scorpions Soccer Club
3	DF	Caidy Nelson	13 August 2008 (aged 15)	
4	MF	Kendyll King	16 April 2007 (aged 17)	
5	DF	Geline Dizon	27 April 2007 (aged 17)	
6	DF	Anna Medalla	29 March 2007 (aged 17)	
7	FW	Jael Guy	15 August 2007 (aged 16)	
8	MF	Francesca Alberto	19 January 2007 (aged 17)	
9	MF	Sophia Saludares	9 November 2007 (aged 16)	
10	DF	Luna Rivera	10 December 2009 (aged 14)	
11	FW	Kieran Bradley	12 January 2008 (aged 16)	
12	MF	Tea Pidding	31 October 2008 (aged 15)	
13	FW	Natalie Collins	28 May 2007 (aged 16)	(United States) Heat
14	DF	Ariana Markey	8 June 2007 (aged 16)	
15	FW	Louraine Evangelista	7 January 2009 (aged 15)	(Philippines) Tuloy
16	DF	Jelena Soon	18 February 2007 (aged 17)	(Philippines) Beach Hut
17	DF	Aiselyn Sia	23 February 2009 (aged 15)	(United States) Martin Luther King High School
18	GK	Leah Bradley	7 April 2009 (aged 15)	(United States) Wilmington Hammerheads
19	MF	Ava Villapando	8 May 2008 (aged 15)	
20	MF	Isabella Alamo	21 March 2007 (aged 17)	
21	DF	Lauren Villasin	27 June 2007 (aged 16)	(United States) University of Albany
22	GK	Samantha Hughes	21 May 2008 (aged 15)	(Australia) Lions
23	MF	Alexa Pino	1 March 2007 (aged 17)	(United States) St. Joseph Cadets

=== South Korea ===
Coach: Kim Eun-jung

The final squad was announced on 27 April 2024.

No.	Pos.	Player	Date of birth (age)	Club
1	GK	Woo Su-min	18 May 2007 (aged 16)	(South Korea) Pohang Girls' Electronic High School
2	DF	Shin Da-in	1 May 2007 (aged 17)	(South Korea) Ulsan Hyundai High School
3	DF	Ryoo Ji-hae	22 February 2008 (aged 16)	(South Korea) Ulsan Hyundai High School
4	DF	Sin Seong-hui	27 June 2007 (aged 16)	(South Korea) Ulsan Hyundai High School
5	DF	Lee Ha-eun	1 October 2007 (aged 16)	(South Korea) Ulsan Hyundai High School
6	DF	Noh Si-eun	24 March 2007 (aged 17)	(South Korea) Ulsan Hyundai High School
7	MF	Kim Yee-un	25 April 2007 (aged 17)	(South Korea) Ulsan Hyundai High School
8	MF	Beom Ye-ju	12 August 2007 (aged 16)	(South Korea) Gwangyang Girls' High School
9	MF	Baek Ji-eun	16 February 2008 (aged 16)	(South Korea) Ulsan Hyundai High School
10	FW	Won Ju-eun	9 March 2007 (aged 17)	(South Korea) Ulsan Hyundai High School
11	MF	Seo Min-jeong	31 January 2007 (aged 17)	(South Korea) Gyeongnam Robot High School
12	MF	Kwon Da-eun	5 September 2007 (aged 16)	(South Korea) Ulsan Hyundai High School
13	MF	Kim Ji-hyo	25 December 2007 (aged 16)	(South Korea) Gyeongnam Robot High School
14	FW	Kim Hyo-won	24 June 2007 (aged 16)	(South Korea) Gwangyang Girls' High School
15	MF	Park Ju-ha	10 October 2007 (aged 16)	(South Korea) Chungju Yesung Girls' High School
16	DF	Park Ji-yu	6 September 2007 (aged 16)	(South Korea) Chungju Yesung Girls' High School
17	MF	Nam Sa-rang	30 October 2007 (aged 16)	(South Korea) Ulsan Hyundai High School
18	GK	Lee Yeo-eun	18 June 2007 (aged 16)	(South Korea) Hwacheon Information High School
19	FW	Casey Phair	29 June 2007 (aged 16)	(United States) Angel City FC
20	DF	Ji Ae	1 May 2007 (aged 17)	(South Korea) Hwacheon Information High School
21	GK	Kim Chae-bin	14 April 2008 (aged 16)	(South Korea) Gwangyang Girls' High School
22	MF	Han Hee	21 August 2009 (aged 14)	(South Korea) Ulsan Hyundai High School
23	FW	Jeong Ye-won	3 June 2008 (aged 15)	(South Korea) Osan Information High School

== Group B ==
=== Australia ===
Coach: Rae Dower

The final squad was announced on 17 April 2024. Shelby McMahon was replaced by Amelia Bennett due to shin injury on 3 May 2024.

No.	Pos.	Player	Date of birth (age)	Caps	Goals	Club
1	GK	Layla Adams	18 January 2007 (aged 17)	2	0	(Australia) Gold Coast United
2	DF	Amelia Tartaglia	9 April 2008 (aged 16)	6	0	(Australia) FFV NTC
3	DF	Chloe Parker	15 January 2007 (aged 17)	5	0	(Australia) Queensland Academy of Sport
4	DF	Ruby Cuthbert (captain)	6 March 2007 (aged 17)	8	1	(Australia) Brisbane Roar
5	MF	Kiera Meyers	22 June 2007 (aged 16)	3	2	(Australia) Melbourne City
6	MF	Amelia Bennett	22 May 2008 (aged 15)	0	0	(Australia) FNSW Institute
7	MF	Sian Dewey	9 June 2007 (aged 16)	2	0	(Australia) Adelaide United
8	MF	Talia Younis	26 October 2008 (aged 15)	8	2	(Australia) Western Sydney Wanderers
9	FW	Sienna Dale	19 April 2007 (aged 17)	5	7	(Australia) Manly United
10	MF	Indiana Dos Santos	10 October 2007 (aged 16)	5	1	(Australia) Sydney FC
11	FW	Tiana Fuller	28 July 2008 (aged 15)	3	4	(Australia) FNSW Institute
12	GK	Jessica Skinner	24 July 2007 (aged 16)	3	0	(Australia) Football West NTC
13	MF	Mikayla Duong	5 March 2008 (aged 16)	1	1	(Australia) FNSW Institute
14	FW	Lily Punch	25 September 2008 (aged 15)	3	0	(Australia) Queensland Academy of Sport
15	DF	Isabela Hoyos	23 May 2008 (aged 15)	3	0	(Australia) Queensland Academy of Sport
16	MF	Ehva Gutszmit	21 January 2007 (aged 17)	0	0	(Australia) FFV NTC
17	DF	Annabelle Yates	17 July 2007 (aged 16)	3	0	(Australia) FFV NTC
18	GK	Caoimhe Bray	23 September 2009 (aged 14)	0	0	(Australia) Emerging Jets
19	FW	Clancy Westaway	1 October 2007 (aged 16)	0	0	(Australia) FFV NTC
20	DF	Alvina Khoshaba	22 April 2007 (aged 17)	4	0	(Australia) FNSW Institute
21	MF	Emma Dundas	29 May 2007 (aged 16)	1	0	(Australia) Newcastle Jets
22	DF	Christina Kiceec	10 January 2007 (aged 17)	1	1	(Australia) FNSW Institute
23	FW	Alice Francou	3 January 2008 (aged 16)	0	0	(Australia) FFV NTC

=== China ===
Coach: (Australia) Gary van Egmond

The final squad was announced on 30 April 2024.

No.	Pos.	Player	Date of birth (age)	Club
1	GK	Hou Shumei	30 December 2007 (aged 16)	(China) Liaoning
2	FW	Zhang Jie	13 December 2008 (aged 15)	(China) Zhejiang
3	MF	Wu Zhe	10 December 2007 (aged 16)	(China) Shanghai
4	DF	Song Yu	21 May 2008 (aged 15)	(China) Beijing
5	MF	Cheng Haitang	21 January 2007 (aged 17)	(China) Guangzhou
6	MF	Yuan Chenjie	6 April 2007 (aged 17)	(China) Jiangsu
7	DF	Wei Xuanxuan	12 November 2007 (aged 16)	(China) Jiangsu
8	DF	Chen Rui	2 July 2007 (aged 16)	(China) Beijing
9	FW	Li Yuhan	8 June 2007 (aged 16)	(China) Shaanxi
10	FW	Xiao Jiaqi	22 April 2007 (aged 17)	(China) Dalian
11	DF	Wang Dantong	22 April 2007 (aged 17)	(China) Baoding
12	GK	You Yaxin	17 October 2008 (aged 15)	(China) Jiangsu
13	FW	Liu Zeyu	1 May 2007 (aged 17)	(China) Beijing
14	MF	Lin Yuya	18 December 2008 (aged 15)	(China) Shaanxi
15	DF	Sun Mengyue	5 January 2007 (aged 17)	(China) Hubei
16	MF	Zhang Kecan	17 September 2008 (aged 15)	(China) Shandong
17	FW	Dong Yujie	26 September 2007 (aged 16)	(China) Shandong
18	DF	Liu Jingwen	5 January 2007 (aged 17)	(China) Guangzhou
19	DF	Yang Yifan	17 January 2007 (aged 17)	(China) Shanghai
20	MF	Chen Ziyi	28 September 2007 (aged 16)	(China) Shanghai
21	FW	Zhou Xinyi	26 February 2008 (aged 16)	(China) Shanghai
22	MF	Zhong Yuxin	29 July 2007 (aged 16)	(China) Chengdu
23	GK	Ruan Xiuyu	1 November 2007 (aged 16)	(China) Shanghai

=== Japan ===
Coach: Sadayoshi Shirai

The final squad was announced on 12 April 2024.

No.	Pos.	Player	Date of birth (age)	Club
1	GK	Airi Nagai	6 September 2007 (aged 16)	(Japan) Tokyo Verdy Menina
2	DF	Yuna Aoki	7 July 2008 (aged 15)	(Japan) Tokyo Verdy Menina
3	DF	Yuka Makiguchi	16 July 2007 (aged 16)	(Japan) Cerezo Osaka Yanmar U-18
4	DF	Mitsuki Ota	20 January 2007 (aged 17)	(Japan) Daisho Gakuen High School
5	MF	Manaka Sakaki	10 October 2007 (aged 16)	(Japan) JFA Academy Fukushima
6	DF	Haruko Suzuki	11 January 2007 (aged 17)	(Japan) Tokyo Verdy Menina
7	MF	Hana Kikuchi	6 September 2007 (aged 16)	(Japan) Mynavi Sendai Youth
8	FW	Hinako Kinoshita	5 January 2007 (aged 17)	(Japan) Cerezo Osaka Yanmar U-18
9	FW	Momo Sato	12 July 2007 (aged 16)	(Japan) Daisho Gakuen High School
10	MF	Asako Furuta	23 April 2007 (aged 17)	(Japan) Cerezo Osaka Yanmar U-18
11	FW	Ririka Nezu	10 July 2007 (aged 16)	(Japan) JEF United Chiba U-18
12	FW	Anon Tsuda	8 November 2007 (aged 16)	(Japan) Mynavi Sendai Youth
13	DF	Chihiro Sugawara	25 February 2007 (aged 17)	(Japan) Mynavi Sendai Youth
14	MF	Miharu Shinjo	5 February 2007 (aged 17)	(Japan) Tokyo Verdy Menina
15	MF	Momoka Honda	12 June 2007 (aged 16)	(Japan) Jumonji High School
16	MF	Noa Fukushima	12 December 2008 (aged 15)	(Japan) JFA Academy Fukushima
17	DF	Tamami Aso	26 October 2007 (aged 16)	(Japan) Tokyo Verdy Menina
18	GK	Korin Sakata	19 April 2007 (aged 17)	Japan Soccer College High School
19	FW	Amiru Tsuji	8 September 2007 (aged 16)	(Japan) Urawa Red Diamonds Youth
20	FW	Mei Hanashiro	23 June 2009 (aged 14)	(Japan) JFA Academy Fukushima
21	GK	Mao Fukuda	24 June 2007 (aged 16)	(Japan) JFA Academy Fukushima
22	MF	Hina Hirakawa	6 October 2008 (aged 15)	(Japan) Urawa Red Diamonds Youth
23	FW	Meiko Matsuura	23 June 2007 (aged 16)	(Japan) Tokoha University Tachibana High School

=== Thailand ===
Coach: Kritsada Phungmali

The final squad was announced on 27 April 2024.

No.	Pos.	Player	Date of birth (age)	Club
1	GK	Benyapa Singsai	5 March 2009 (aged 15)	(Thailand) Chonburi Sports School
2	DF	Napatsawan Suebsuan	3 June 2009 (aged 14)	(Thailand) Chonburi Sports School
3	DF	Alissada Yuttakas	20 March 2008 (aged 16)	(Thailand) Nakhon Si Thammarat Provincial Sports School
4	MF	Siriwimon Mukdasakulpibal	1 March 2008 (aged 16)	(Thailand) Nakhon Si Thammarat Provincial Sports School
5	DF	Manita Noyvach	15 November 2007 (aged 16)	(Thailand) Chonburi Sports School
6	DF	Pinyaphat Klinklai	26 January 2008 (aged 16)	(Thailand) Nakhon Si Thammarat Provincial Sports School
7	MF	Rinyaphat Moondong	19 June 2007 (aged 16)	(Thailand) Khelang United
8	MF	Rasita Taobao	6 June 2007 (aged 16)	(Thailand) Chonburi Sports School
9	FW	Achiraya Yingsakul	13 December 2007 (aged 16)	(Thailand) Phranakorn
10	FW	Madison Casteen	15 October 2007 (aged 16)	(United States) North Carolina Fusion
11	DF	Phatcharaphorn Khuchuea	23 October 2007 (aged 16)	(Thailand) Khelang United
12	MF	Matika Thaprik	31 May 2008 (aged 15)	(Thailand) Pandit Asia
13	MF	Chirarak Khamtan	9 July 2008 (aged 15)	(Thailand) Khelang United
14	DF	Julaiporn Jaimulwong	7 April 2007 (aged 17)	(Thailand) Chonburi Sports School
15	MF	Prichakorn Kruechuenchom	4 December 2008 (aged 15)	(Thailand) Chonburi Sports School
16	MF	Nachanok Kosonsaksakun	22 September 2008 (aged 15)	(Thailand) Phranakorn
17	MF	Aunchidtha Homtago	29 January 2009 (aged 15)	(Thailand) Chonburi Sports School
18	GK	Atima Boonprakanpai	13 March 2007 (aged 17)	(Thailand) Surin Hinkhon United
19	FW	Kurisara Limpawanich	5 February 2009 (aged 15)	(Philippines) Makati
20	FW	Chutikan Kitikhun	20 April 2007 (aged 17)	(Thailand) Khon Kaen Sports School
21	FW	Porntita Sitthisan	3 February 2007 (aged 17)	(Thailand) Chonburi Sports School
22	GK	Pimlapat Aeewong	9 September 2009 (aged 14)	(Thailand) Phranakorn
23	MF	Methini Bupphahao	5 April 2007 (aged 17)	(Thailand) Bangkok Sports School
