= Pertiwi Cup =

- Founded: 2006; 20 years ago
- Region: Indonesia
- Teams: 16 (2025)
- Current champions: Toli Putri (3rd title)
- Most championships: Papua (4 titles)
- Broadcaster: Vidio
- Website: ASBWI
- 2025 Pertiwi Cup

Piala Pertiwi (English: Motherland's Cup) is the main national women's football cup competition in Indonesia, thus the female counterpart to the Piala Indonesia. This competition is managed by women's football board, under supervision of the Football Association of Indonesia (PSSI), and has been held since 2006. In the first three edition, the tournament name was Women's National Football Championship, before renamed to Pertiwi Cup in 2014.

== List of finals ==
Year	Winner	Result	Runner-up
2006	Putri Dafonsoro (Papua)	—N/a	Buana Putri (Jakarta)
2008	West Java	3–2	Yogyakarta 1
2010	Papua	4–0	West Java
2014	Papua 2	2–0	Papua 1
2017	Papua	2–1	West Kalimantan
2018–19	Persimura Putri (South Sumatra)	2–1	Bangka Belitung
2021–22	Toli Putri (Papua)	3–1	PS Bangka Putri (Bangka Belitung)
2024	Toli Putri (Highland Papua)	3–0	Raga Negeri Putri (Banten)
2025	Toli Putri (Highland Papua)	1–0	Persib Putri (West Java)

== Performances ==
Club	Winners	Runners-up	Years won	Years runners-up	Total final appearances
Papua	3	–	2010, 2017, 2021–22	–	3
Highland Papua	2	–	2024, 2025	–	2
West Java	1	2	2008	2014, 2025	3
Papua 2	1	–	2014	–	1
Putri Dafonsoro	1	–	2006	–	1
South Sumatra	1	–	2018–19	–	1
Bangka Belitung	–	2	–	2018–19, 2021–22	2
Buana Putri	–	1	–	2006	1
Banten	–	1	–	2024	1
Papua 1	–	1	–	2014	1
West Kalimantan	–	1	–	2017	1
Yogyakarta 1	–	1	–	2008	1

== Awards ==
=== Top scorer ===
Year	Scorer	Club	Goals
2006	(Indonesia) Hannah Herriman	Yogyakarta	15
2008	(Indonesia) Lintang Marsini	Yogyakarta 1	14
2010	(Indonesia) Akudiana Tebay	Papua	6
2014	(Indonesia) Henny Jigibalom	Papua 2	9
2017	(Indonesia) Rani Mulyasari	Bangka Belitung	8
2018–19	(Indonesia) Febiana Kusumaningrum	South Sumatra	7
2021–22	(Indonesia) Dewi Tia	Arema Putri	10
2024	(Indonesia) Neng Resti Agustiani	Persib Putri	7
2025	(Indonesia) Neng Resti Agustiani	Persib Putri	16

=== Best players ===
Year	Player	Club
2006	—N/a	—N/a
2008	—N/a	—N/a
2010	(Indonesia) Akudiana Tebay	Papua
2014	(Indonesia) Christina Kaisiri	Papua 2
2017	(Indonesia) Yudith Herlina Sada	Papua
2018–19	(Indonesia) Azra Zifa Kayla	Jakarta
2021–22	—N/a	—N/a
2024	(Indonesia) Marsela Awi	Toli Putri
2025	(Indonesia) Liza Armanita Madjar	Toli Putri

== See also ==
- Liga 1 Putri
- Women's football in Indonesia
