= 2025 Pertiwi Cup =

Tournament details
- Country: Indonesia
- Dates: National round: 30 October — 10 November 2025
- Teams: 14

Final positions
- Champions: Toli Putri (Papua)
- Runners-up: Persib Putri (Jabar)

Tournament statistics
- Matches played: 28
- Goals scored: 182 (6.5 per match)
- Top goal scorer(s): Neng Resti Agustiani (15 goals)

The 2025 Pertiwi Cup is the eight edition of Pertiwi Cup. The tournament started on 30 October 2025 and ended on 10 November 2025. All matches were played in Yogyakarta. The tournament was organized by the Indonesian Women's Football Association under supervision of the Football Association of Indonesia.

== Provincial round ==
Sumatra
Province	Qualified teams
North Sumatra	BHRU Sumut
Bengkulu	Bengkulu Soccer Club

Kalimantan
Province	Qualified teams
West Kalimantan	Putri Asprov Kalbar
Central Kalimantan	Putri Asprov Kalteng
East Kalimantan	Kertanegara Women F.C.

Java
Province	Qualified teams
Banten	Putri Asprov Banten
Jakarta	Putri Asprov DK Jakarta
West Java	Persib Putri
Central Java	UNSA FC Women
Special Region of Yogyakarta	DI Yogyakarta All Stars
East Java	Arema Putri

Lesser Sunda Islands
Province	Qualified teams
West Nusa Tenggara	Neo Angel

Sulawesi
Province	Qualified teams
South Sulawesi	Putri Asprov Sulsel

Papua
Province	Qualified teams
Highland Papua	Toli Putri

== National round ==
=== Group stage ===
==== Group A ====
Pos	Team	Pld	W	D	L	GF	GA	GD	Pts	Qualification	(East Java) ARM	(West Kalimantan) KLB	(Central Java) UNS	(Jakarta) DKJ
1	(East Java) Arema Putri	3	3	0	0	15	0	+15	9	Advance to knockout stage	—	—	—	8–0
2	(West Kalimantan) Putri Asprov Kalbar	3	2	0	1	4	4	0	6	Advance to knockout stage	0–4	—	3–0 (Note: Central Java was declared lose 0–3 for fielding an ineligible player.)	—
3	(Central Java) UNSA FC Women	3	1	0	2	4	6	−2	3		0–3	—	—	—
4	Putri Asprov Jakarta	3	0	0	3	0	13	−13	0		—	0–1	0–4	—

Source: ASBWI

==== Group B ====
Pos	Team	Pld	W	D	L	GF	GA	GD	Pts	Qualification	(Highland Papua) TOL	(North Sumatra) BHR	(Bengkulu) BSC	(East Kalimantan) KTN
1	(Highland Papua) Toli Putri	3	3	0	0	22	2	+20	9	Advance to knockout stage	—	9–1	—	3–1
2	(North Sumatra) BHRU Sumut	3	1	1	1	6	11	−5	4	Advance to knockout stage	—	—	4–1	1–1
3	Bengkulu Soccer Club	3	1	0	2	4	16	−12	3		0–10	—	—	—
4	(East Kalimantan) Kertanegara Women F.C.	3	0	1	2	4	7	−3	1		—	—	2–3	—

Source: ASBWI

==== Group C ====
Pos	Team	Pld	W	D	L	GF	GA	GD	Pts	Qualification	(West Java) PSB	(Special Region of Yogyakarta) DIY	(South Sulawesi) SLS
1	(West Java) Persib Putri	2	2	0	0	14	1	+13	6	Advance to knockout stage	—	6–1	—
2	(Special Region of Yogyakarta) DI Yogyakarta All Stars	2	1	0	1	4	6	−2	3	Advance to knockout stage	—	—	3–0 (Note: South Sulawesi was declared lose 0–3 for fielding an ineligible player.)
3	(South Sulawesi) Putri Asprov Sulsel	2	0	0	2	0	11	−11	0		0–8	—	—

Source: ASBWI

==== Group D ====
Pos	Team	Pld	W	D	L	GF	GA	GD	Pts	Qualification	(Banten) BTN	(Central Kalimantan) KTG	(West Nusa Tenggara) NTB
1	Putri Asprov Banten	2	2	0	0	18	0	+18	6	Advance to knockout stage	—	3–0	—
2	(Central Kalimantan) Putri Asprov Kalteng	2	1	0	1	12	3	+9	3	Advance to knockout stage	—	—	—
3	(West Nusa Tenggara) Neo Angel	2	0	0	2	0	27	−27	0		0–15	0–12	—

Source: ASBWI

=== Quarter-finals ===
6 November 2025
08:00

Arema Putri (East Java)	1–1	BHRU Sumut (North Sumatra)
Andini Angelina Putri 49'		Malia Siregar 75'
Penalties
	4–5

UII Field, Sleman Regency
6 November 2025
08:00

Persib Putri (West Java)	6–1	Putri Asprov Kalteng (Central Kalimantan)
Neng Resti 14' 50' 56' 90+1'; Zahra Nafisa 29'; Dian Fitri 75'		Windi 79'

Purwobinangun Field, Sleman Regency

6 November 2025
13:30

Toli Putri (Highland Papua)	8–0	Putri Asprov Kalbar (West Kalimantan)
Liza Armanita Madjar 4' 38'; Kristina Bapan 42'; Anitha Isabela Sroyer 49' 62'; Debora Pagawak 51'; Ida Ellha Hawida 55'; Rana Wandik 72'

UII Field, Sleman Regency
6 November 2025
13:30

Putri Asprov Banten (Banten)	2–0	Yogyakarta All Stars (Yogyakarta)
Sri Maharani 45+1'; Rihla Nuer 62'

Purwobinangun Field, Sleman Regency

=== Semi-finals ===
7 November 2025
08:00

BHRU Sumut (North Sumatra)	0–7	Persib Putri (West Java)
		Neng Resti 5' 11' 17' 29' 56' 75'; Zilfa Aninda 90'

UII Field, Sleman Regency

7 November 2025
13:30

Toli Putri (Highland Papua)	1–0	Putri Asprov Banten (Banten)
Ianell K. 30'

UII Field, Sleman Regency

=== Thrid place ===
10 November 2025
08:00

BHRU Sumut (North Sumatra)	0–3	Putri Asprov Banten (Banten)
		Firanda 6'; Salsa Nabila 16'; Sri Maharani 72'

UII Field, Sleman Regency

=== Final ===
10 November 2025
13:30

Toli Putri (Highland Papua)	1–0	Persib Putri (West Java)
own goal 90'

UII Field, Sleman Regency

== Top goalscorers ==
Rank	Player	Team	Goals
1	(Indonesia) Neng Resti Agustiani	Persib Putri	15
2	(Indonesia) Firanda	Putri Asprov Banten	8
3	(Indonesia) Ida Ellha Hawida	Toli Putri	7
3	(Indonesia) Anitha Isabela Sroyer	Toli Putri	7
5	(Indonesia) Valencia Cessa	Putri Asprov Kalteng	6
6	(Indonesia) Andini Angelina Putri	Arema Putri	5
7	(Indonesia) Feni Finbarek	Toli Putri	4
7	(Indonesia) Debora Pagawak	Toli Putri	4
