= 2021–22 Pertiwi Cup =

Tournament details
- Country: Indonesia
- Dates: Provincial round: 24 October 2021 – 15 March 2022; National round: 18 March — 28 March 2022
- Teams: 18

Final positions
- Champions: Toli Putri (Papua)
- Runners-up: PS Bangka Putri (Babel)

Tournament statistics
- Matches played: 42
- Goals scored: 175 (4.17 per match)
- Top goal scorer(s): Dewi Tia (10 goals)

The 2021–22 Pertiwi Cup is the seventh edition of Pertiwi Cup. The tournament started on 18 March 2022 and ended on 28 March 2022. All matches were played in Bandung, West Java. The tournament was organized by Indonesian Women's Football Association under supervision of PSSI.

== Provincial round ==
Sumatra
Province	Qualified teams
Bengkulu	PS Bengkulu Putri
(Bangka Belitung Islands) Bangka Belitung	PS Bangka Putri
Lampung	Spektra Trisula Putri

Kalimantan
Province	Qualified teams
West Kalimantan	Persipon Putri
Central Kalimantan	Kalteng Putri
East Kalimantan	Putri Askot Samarinda

Java
Province	Qualified teams
Banten	Putri BMIFA
Jakarta	Persija Putri (Note: The team used in preparation for PON 2024.)
West Java	Persib Putri
Central Java	Putri Wijayakusuma
(Special Region of Yogyakarta) Yogyakarta	Putri Mataram
East Java	Arema Putri

Lesser Sunda Islands
Province	Qualified teams
West Nusa Tenggara	Neo Angel
East Nusa Tenggara	PPLM Kemenpora

Sulawesi
Province	Qualified teams
South Sulawesi	RGC Foundation
Gorontalo	Women Selection Gorut

Papua
Province	Qualified teams
(Papua (province)) Papua	Toli Putri
(West Papua (province)) West Papua	Putri Asprov Papua Barat

Withdrawn teams
Province	Teams
Bali	Bali All Stars Putri

== National round ==
=== Group stage ===
==== Group A ====
Pos	Team	Pld	W	D	L	GF	GA	GD	Pts	Qualification	(Papua (province)) TOL	(Bangka Belitung Islands) BGK	(Central Kalimantan) KTP	(West Java) PSB	(Central Java) PWK
1	(Papua (province)) Toli Putri	4	3	1	0	15	3	+12	10	Advance to knockout stage	—	—	2–0	—	—
2	(Bangka Belitung Islands) PS Bangka Putri	4	3	1	0	15	4	+11	10	Advance to knockout stage	3–3	—	—	4–1	3–0
3	(Central Kalimantan) Kalteng Putri	4	2	0	2	5	10	−5	6		—	0–5	—	—	1–0
4	(West Java) Persib Putri	4	1	0	3	10	15	−5	3		0–7	—	3–4	—	6–0
5	(Central Java) Putri Wijayakusuma	4	0	0	4	0	13	−13	0		0–3	—	—	—	—

Source: ASBWI

==== Group B ====
Pos	Team	Pld	W	D	L	GF	GA	GD	Pts	Qualification	(East Java) AFC	(Special Region of Yogyakarta) MTM	(Gorontalo) WSG	(West Kalimantan) PSP	(West Nusa Tenggara) NAM
1	(East Java) Arema Putri	4	4	0	0	31	1	+30	12	Advance to knockout stage	—	—	10–1	7–0	8–0
2	(Special Region of Yogyakarta) Putri Mataram	4	2	1	1	13	10	+3	7	Advance to knockout stage	0–6	—	2–2	—	8–1
3	(Gorontalo) Women Selection Gorut	4	1	2	1	11	15	−4	5		—	—	—	—	5–0
4	(West Kalimantan) Persipon Putri	4	1	1	2	8	15	−7	4		—	1–3	3–3	—	—
5	(West Nusa Tenggara) Neo Angel	4	0	0	4	3	25	−22	0		—	—	—	2–4	—

Source: ASBWI

==== Group C ====
Pos	Team	Pld	W	D	L	GF	GA	GD	Pts	Qualification	(East Kalimantan) SMR	(Lampung) SPT	(South Sulawesi) RGC	(Bengkulu) BEN	(West Papua (province)) PBA
1	(East Kalimantan) Putri Askot Samarinda	4	3	1	0	9	1	+8	10	Advance to knockout stage	—	—	—	3–1	3–0 (Note: West Papua declared walkout)
2	(Lampung) Spektra Trisula Putri	4	3	0	1	8	4	+4	9	Advance to knockout stage	0–3	—	2–1	—	—
3	(South Sulawesi) RGC Foundation	4	2	1	1	9	2	+7	7		0–0	—	—	—	3–0
4	PS Bengkulu Putri	4	1	0	3	4	11	−7	3		—	0–3	0–5	—	3–0
5	(West Papua (province)) Putri Asprov Papua Barat	4	0	0	4	0	12	−12	0		—	0–3	—	—	—

Source: ASBWI

==== Group D ====
Pos	Team	Pld	W	D	L	GF	GA	GD	Pts	Qualification	(East Nusa Tenggara) NTT	(Banten) BMI	(Jakarta) DKI
1	(East Nusa Tenggara) PPLM Kemenpora	2	1	1	0	1	0	+1	4	Advance to knockout stage	—	1–0	—
2	(Banten) Putri BMIFA	2	1	0	1	4	1	+3	3	Advance to knockout stage	—	—	—
3	(Jakarta) Persija Putri	2	0	1	1	0	4	−4	1		0–0	0–4	—

Source: ASBWI

=== Knockout stage ===
All times were local, WIB (UTC+7).

==== Bracket ====
Quarter-finals
(Papua (province)) Toli Putri	13
(Lampung) Spektra Trisula Putri	0
(East Java) Arema Putri	3
(Banten) Putri BMIFA	0
(East Kalimantan) Putri Askot Samarinda	0
(Bangka Belitung Islands) PS Bangka Putri	2
(East Nusa Tenggara) PPLM Kemenpora	1
(Special Region of Yogyakarta) Putri Mataram	0

Semi-finals
(Papua (province)) Toli Putri	1
(East Java) Arema Putri	0
(Bangka Belitung Islands) PS Bangka Putri	2
(East Nusa Tenggara) PPLM Kemenpora	0

Finals
(Papua (province)) Toli Putri	3
(Bangka Belitung Islands) PS Bangka Putri	1
Third place
(East Java) Arema Putri	2
(East Nusa Tenggara) PPLM Kemenpora	0

=== Quarter-finals ===
24 March 2022
07:30

Toli Putri (Papua)	13–0	Spektra Trisula Putri (Lampung)
Remini 7', 76'; Marsela 15', 28'; Selly Wamungga 29'; Feni Binbarek 36', 56'; Liza Armanita 38'; Ina Paulanda 45'; Barbalina Salampessy 61', 68'; Yuliana Ongge 63'; Imelda Troce 70'	Report

Sabilulungan Field, Bandung Regency

24 March 2022
10:00

Putri Askot Samarinda (Kaltim)	0–2	PS Bangka Putri (Babel)
	Report	Rosdilah 11'; Reva 38'

Sabilulungan Field, Bandung Regency
Referee: Siswanto

24 March 2022
13:30

Arema Putri (Jatim)	3–0	Putri BMIFA (Banten)
Dewi 38'; Helsya 45'; Citra Ramadhani 79'	Report

Sabilulungan Field, Bandung Regency

24 March 2022
16:00

PPLM Kemenpora (NTT)	1–0	Putri Mataram (Yogyakarta)
Puput Ulyani 86'	Report

Sabilulungan Field, Bandung Regency

=== Semi-finals ===
26 March 2022
13:00

Toli Putri (Papua)	1–0	Arema Putri (Jatim)
Feni Binbarek 55'	Report

Sabilulungan Field, Bandung Regency
Referee: Fadli Nurdiana

26 March 2022
15:00

PS Bangka Putri (Babel)	2–1	PPLM Kemenpora (NTT)
Carla 10'; Sheva Imut Furyzcha 24'	Report	Berlian Asya Pertiwi 60'

Sabilulungan Field, Bandung Regency

=== Third place ===
28 March 2022
11:00

Arema Putri (Jatim)	2–0	PPLM Kemenpora (NTT)
Citra Ramadhani 52'; Dewi 66'	Report

Sabilulungan Field, Bandung Regency

=== Final ===
28 March 2022
14:30

Toli Putri (Papua)	3–1	PS Bangka Putri (Babel)
Marsela 38', 79'; Remini 41'	Report	Firanda 39'

Sabilulungan Field, Bandung Regency

== Top goalscorers ==
As of 28 March 2022

Rank	Player	Team	Goals
1	(Indonesia) Dewi Tia	Arema Putri	10
2	(Indonesia) Citra Ramadhani	Arema Putri	8
3	(Indonesia) Marsela Yuliana	Toli Putri	7
3	(Indonesia) Fitria Seltika	Persipon Putri	7
3	(Indonesia) Neng Resti Agustiani	Persib Putri	7
6	(Indonesia) Feni Binbarek	Toli Putri	6
6	(Indonesia) Sheva Imut Furcyzcha	PS Bangka Putri	6
