= Nafeeza Nori =

Indonesian footballer (born 2011)

- Nafeeza with Indonesia U16 in 2026

Personal information
- Full name: Nafeeza Ayasha Nori
- Date of birth: 29 March 2011 (age 15)
- Place of birth: Bandung, Indonesia
- Position: Midfielder

Team information
- Current team: Persija Jakarta
- Number: 10

Youth career
- Mojang Priangan

Senior career*
Years	Team	Apps	(Gls)
2024–2026	Makati		
2026–	Persija Jakarta	6	(0)

International career
2025–	Indonesia U16		
2025–	Indonesia U17		
2025–	Indonesia	2	(0)
- * Club domestic league appearances and goals as of 22 November 2026

Nafeeza Ayasha Nori (born 29 March 2011) is an Indonesian professional footballer who plays as a midfielder for Indonesia Women's League club Persija Jakarta and the Indonesia national team.

== Club career ==
=== Makati FC ===
In December 2024, Nafeeza moved to the Philippines after receiving an offer to join Makati F.C., where she competed in the PFF Women's League. At the age of 13, she began living and training in the Philippines with teammates from different parts of the country.

On 6 April 2025, she scored a goal in Makati's 4–0 victory over UST Lady Booters in the PFF Women's League. She was subsequently named Women of the Match for her performance.

=== Persija Jakarta Women ===
In 2026, Nafeeza returned to Indonesia and joined Persija Jakarta Women to compete in the inaugural Indonesia Women's League 2026–27 season.

== International career ==
Nafeeza has represented Indonesia in women's youth football. In August 2025, she was included in the Indonesia under-16 squad for the 2025 ASEAN U-16 Women's Championship.

In October 2025, she was selected for the Indonesia under-17 squad for the 2026 AFC U-17 Women's Asian Cup qualification.

In May 2026, Nafeeza was among the Indonesia under-17 players who participated in a training camp at the Clairefontaine National Football Centre in France from 3 to 9 May.

== Honours ==
Indonesia U16

- Srikandi Merdeka Cup runner-up: 2026
