= Risa Afriyani Ulfa =

Indonesian footballer

Risa Afriyani
Personal information
- Full name: Risa Afriyani Ulfa
- Date of birth: 11 April 1996 (age 30)
- Place of birth: Jakarta, Indonesia
- Height: 1.52 m (5 ft 0 in)
- Position: Midfielder

Team information
- Current team: Persija Jakarta
- Number: 29

Senior career*
Years	Team	Apps	(Gls)
2019–	Persija Jakarta	2	(0)

International career
2023–	Indonesia	1	(0)
- * Club domestic league appearances and goals

Risa Afriyani Ulfa (born 11 April 1996) is an Indonesian footballer who plays a midfielder for Indonesia Women's League club Persija Jakarta, which she captains, and has made one appearance for the Indonesia national team.

== Club career ==
Risa was a member of the Persija Putri squad that competed in the 2019 Liga 1 Putri. Ahead of the 2026–27 Indonesia Women's League season, she was appointed as the club captain of the club.

== International career ==
Risa received her maiden call-up to the senior Indonesia women's national football team in February 2023 for the FIFA Matchday fixtures. She was named in the final 23-player squad traveling for international friendly matches against Saudi Arabia.
