= 2010 Indonesia Women's Football Tournament =

Indonesian Women's Football Tournament
- Season: 2010
- Champions: Papua
- Matches: 13
- Goals: 42 (3.23 per match)
- Top goalscorer: Akudiana Tebay (6)
- Highest scoring: Papua 7-0 North Sumatra
- Longest winning run: Papua (5 games)
- Longest unbeaten run: Papua (5 games)

The 2010 Indonesian Women's Football Tournament season was the third edition of Indonesian Women's Football Tournament (IWFT), a fully professional football competition for women in the country. The competition began on 4 October 2010 and ended on 9 October 2010.

== Format ==
This competition has adopted a single host tournament system, for which Jakarta was chosen as the host. It was contested only by seven out of thirty three provincial football associations in Indonesia.

Each qualified team must include a minimum of eight players under the age of sixteen. It is aimed to develop young female players that have potentials to become the future squad of the Indonesia women's national football team.

The competition began with a group stage using a single round system. Seven teams were divided into two groups. Group A consisted of three teams, while group B four teams. The top two teams from each group advanced to the semifinals, which commences the knock-out tournament. The two winners of the semi-finals then competed for the final match to determine the champion and runner-up, while the losers played for the third and fourth place.

== Qualified teams ==
Women football teams from the following provinces have participated in this edition: North Sumatra, Banten, West Java, Papua, Jakarta, Babel, and Yogyakarta. The other provinces were unable to send their teams due to a lack of preparation.

=== Group stage ===
==== Group A ====
Rank	Team	Pld	W	D	L	GF	GA	GD	Pts
1	West Java	2	2	0	0	6	0	+6	6
2	North Sumatra	2	1	0	1	0	3	-3	3
3	Banten	2	0	0	2	0	3	-3	0

Source: RSSSF

===== Fixtures and results =====
4 October 2010
07:30 WIB

West Java	3–0	North Sumatra
Meylan 3'; Meylan 14'; Meylan 52'

GOR Ragunan
5 October 2010
07:30 WIB

Banten	0–3	West Java
		Meylan 41'; Canigia 64'; Tia 75'

GOR Ragunan
6 October 2010
07:30 WIB

Banten	0–0	North Sumatra
Penalties
Fidelia (penalty scored)	1–2	Novida Sri Devi (penalty scored); Enita Triana (penalty scored)

GOR Ragunan

==== Group B ====
Rank	Team	Pld	W	D	L	GF	GA	GD	Pts
1	Papua	3	3	0	0	10	0	+10	9
2	Jakarta	3	2	0	1	3	1	+2	6
3	Babel	3	0	1	2	2	8	-6	1
4	Yogyakarta	3	0	1	2	2	8	-6	1

Source: RSSSF

===== Fixtures and results =====
4 October 2010
09:30 WIB

Yogyakarta	2–2	Babel
Farhana 39'; Tugiyati 48'		Umi Rosidah 9'; Rosmita 47'

GOR Ragunan
4 October 2010
15:00 WIB

Jakarta	0–1	Papua
		Heny Yigibalom 68'

GOR Ragunan
5 October 2010
09:30 WIB

Jakarta	1–0	Yogyakarta
Rani Mulyasari 74'

GOR Ragunan
5 October 2010
15:00 WIB

Babel	0–4	Papua

GOR Ragunan
6 October 2010
09:30 WIB

Jakarta	2–0	Babel
Maulina Novry Liani 5'; Maulina Novry Liani 56'

GOR Ragunan
6 October 2010
15:00 WIB

Papua	5–0	Yogyakarta

GOR Ragunan

Key to colours in group tables
Top two placed teams advance to the Semifinal

=== Knockout phase ===
Semi-finals
8 October 2010 - GOR Ragunan
Papua	7
North Sumatra	0
8 October 2010 - GOR Ragunan
West Java	2
Jakarta	0

Final
9 October 2010 - GOR Ragunan
Papua	4
West Java	0
Third place
9 October 2010 - GOR Ragunan
North Sumatra	0
Jakarta	6

=== Semifinals ===
8 October 2010

Papua	7–0	North Sumatra
Akudiana Tebay 46' 63'; Heni Jigibalom 54'; Amina Tabuni 78'; Regina Wonda 81'	Report	2 own goal

GOR Ragunan
8 cktober 2010

West Java	2–0	Jakarta
Ira; Siti

GOR Ragunan

=== Third place ===
9 October 2010

North Sumatra	0–6	Jakarta
		Rani Mulyasari 30'; Anggi Puspitasari 40'; Susi Susanti 54'; Maulina Novry Liani 69'; Maulina Novry Liani 80'; Rani Mulyasari 86'

GOR Ragunan

=== Final ===
9 October 2010

Papua	4–0	West Java
Rulin Asparek 12'; Akudiana Tebay 13'; Amina Tabuni 20'; Akudiyana Tebay 44'

GOR Ragunan

== Honors ==
=== Champions ===
Champions
Papua
Prize money: USD 1000

Runner up
West Java
Prize money: USD 750

3rd placed
Jakarta
Prize money: USD 500

=== Top scorers ===
Year	Scorer	Club	Goals	Prize money
2010	(Indonesia) Akudiana Tebay	Papua	6	USD 100

=== Best players ===
Year	Player	Club	Prize money
2010	(Indonesia) Akudiana Tebay	Papua	USD 50

== Top scorers ==
Rank	Scorer	Club	Goals
1	(Indonesia) Akudiana Tebay	Papua	6
2	(Indonesia) Meylan	West Java	4
2	(Indonesia) Maulina Novry Liani	Jakarta	4
4	(Indonesia) Rani Mulyasari	Jakarta	3
