= Mayang Z.P. =

Indonesian footballer

Personal information
- Full name: Mayang Z.P.
- Date of birth: 16 July 1993 (age 33)
- Place of birth: Jakarta, Indonesia
- Position: Striker

Team information
- Current team: Persija Putri
- Number: 10

Senior career*
Years	Team	Apps	(Gls)
2019–	Persija Putri		

International career^{‡}
2019–	Indonesia	13	(4)
- * Club domestic league appearances and goals ‡ National team caps and goals as of 5 December 2024

Mayang Z.P. is an Indonesian footballer who plays as a striker for Persija Putri.

== Early life ==
She was born in 1993 and is regarded as one of the best women's players from Limapuluh Kota Regency.

== Club career ==
She has played for Indonesian side Persija Putri. Besides Indonesia, she has played in Malaysia and Singapore. Besides football, she has worked as a civil servant.

== International career ==
While playing in Malaysia for Selangor, she was invited to represent Malaysia internationally. Despite this offer, she later represented her home nation of Indonesia internationally instead of Malaysia.

== Style of play ==
She mainly operates as a striker.

== Personal life ==
Her hometown is Padang, Indonesia.
