= Sabreena Dressler =

Indonesian footballer

- Dressler in training with Indonesia in 2021

Personal information
- Full name: Sabreena Ashleigh Dressler
- Date of birth: 26 December 2001 (age 24)
- Place of birth: Perth, Western Australia, Australia
- Position: Midfielder

Team information
- Current team: Persija Jakarta

Youth career
- 2018: Pro:Direct Academy

Senior career*
Years	Team	Apps	(Gls)
2019	Persija Jakarta		
2022	Subiaco AFC		
2023	Balcatta		
2024	DKI Jakarta		
2025	FC Spicegals		
2026–	Persija Jakarta	1	(0)

International career
2021	Indonesia (training camp)		
- * Club domestic league appearances and goals as of 8 November 2026

Sabreena Ashleigh Dressler (born 26 December 2001) is an Indonesian professional footballer who plays as a defender for Indonesia Women's League club Persija Jakarta.

== Early life ==
Dressler was born in Perth, Western Australia, on 26 December 2001. She has Indonesian and German ancestry.

She began playing football at a young age and trained at Pro:Direct Academy in 2018. A serious injury interrupted her development, leading to an eight-month recovery period in Germany.

== Club career ==
=== Persija Jakarta ===
Dressler returned to Indonesia in 2019 and joined the women's team of Persija Jakarta. She played as a defender during her time with the club. The suspension of women's league competition in Indonesia during the COVID-19 pandemic disrupted her early senior career.

=== Australia ===
In May 2022, Dressler joined Australian club Subiaco AFC after undertaking trials with clubs in Perth. Her move was reported as an opportunity to continue her football career overseas.

She also played for Balcatta Women's, another club based in Perth.

=== FC Spicegals ===
In April 2025, Dressler joined Malaysian women's club FC Spicegals. The club described her as a winger and highlighted her experience with Persija Jakarta and Subiaco.

== International career ==
In 2021, Dressler was invited to attend a training camp and selection process for the Indonesia women's national football team ahead of the proposed women's football tournament at the 2021 Southeast Asian Games. She did not make the final squad.
