= Prithvi (disambiguation) =

Prithvi is a Sanskrit word for the Earth, and also a Hindu earth goddess.

Prithvi may also refer to:

- Prithvi (missile), a ballistic missile
- Prithvi (1997 film), a Hindi-language film
- Prithvi (2010 film), a Kannada-language film
- Prithvi Chand, Indian politician
- Prithviraj Sukumaran, (born 1982), Indian actor
- Prithvi (musician), Indian music producer

== See also ==
- Pertiwi (disambiguation)
- Prithviraj (disambiguation)
