= Saki Ueno =

Japanese footballer (born 1994)

Saki Ueno 上野 紗稀
- Saki with Persija in 2026

Personal information
- Full name: Saki Ueno
- Date of birth: 20 November 1994 (age 32)
- Place of birth: Matsudo, Chiba, Japan
- Height: 1.54 m (5 ft 1/2 in)
- Position: Left winger

Team information
- Current team: Persija Jakarta
- Number: 8

Youth career
- 2007–2012: Urawa Reds

Senior career*
Years	Team	Apps	(Gls)
2013–2019	JEF United Chiba	48	(1)
2020–2023	Urawa Reds	9	(0)
2023–2024	JEF United Chiba	13	(0)
2024	Young Elephants	3	(0)
2024–2025	Sabah FA	3	(0)
2026	BGC-College of Asian Scholars		
2026–	Persija Jakarta	7	(2)

International career
2013	Japan	1	(0)
Medal record
JEF United Chiba
Winner	Nadeshiko League Cup	2017
Runner-up	Nadeshiko League Cup	2016
- * Club domestic league appearances and goals as of 22 November 2026

Saki Nishihara (西原 紗稀, Nishihara Saki) (born Saki Ueno (上野 紗稀, Ueno Saki) on 20 November 1994) is a Japanese professional footballer who plays as a left winger for Indonesia Women's League club Persija Jakarta and has made one appearance for the Japan national team.

== Club career ==
Ueno was born in Matsudo on November 20, 1994. In 2013, she joined JEF United Chiba from Urawa Reds youth team. She was selected Best Young Player awards in 2013 season. Than she continue her career in JEF United Chiba until 2019 before she moved back to Urawa Reds. In Urawa, she winning the league with Urawa Reds in 2022–23 season.

== International career ==
On 26 September 2013, when Ueno was 18 years old, she debuted for Japan national team against Nigeria.

== Career statistics ==
=== International ===
As of match played 26 September 2013

Japan national team
Year	Apps	Goals
2013	1	0
Total	1	0

== Honours ==
Urawa Red Diamonds

- WE League: 2022–23

Individual

- Nadeshiko League Best Young Player: 2013

== Personal life ==
Ueno married Japanese footballer Takumu Nishihara on 1 June 2024. Following her marriage, she became known as Saki Nishihara.
