= Michika Sakamoto =

Japanese professional footballer

Michika Sakamoto 阪本未周
- Michika with Persija in 2026

Personal information
- Date of birth: July 22, 1998 (age 28)
- Place of birth: Hokkaido, Japan
- Height: 1.65 m (5 ft 5 in)
- Position: Midfielder

Team information
- Current team: Persija Jakarta
- Number: 14

Youth career
- 2017–2020: Waseda University

Senior career*
Years	Team	Apps	(Gls)
2021–2023	Ehime F.C.	14	(0)
2024–2025	C.D. Femarguín	21	(2)
2026–	Persija Jakarta	7	(1)
- * Club domestic league appearances and goals as of 22 November 2026

Michika Sakamoto (阪本未周, Sakamoto Michika; born 22 July 1998) is a Japanese professional footballer who plays as a midfielder for Indonesia Women's League club Persija Jakarta.

== Early life ==
Born in Japan, Sakamoto played collegiate football at Waseda University from 2017 to 2020.

== Club career ==
In 2021, Sakamoto joined Japanese side Ehime F.C., where she played until 2023. She then moved to Spain in 2024 to play for C.D. Femarguín.

Ahead of the inaugural 2026–27 season of the Indonesia Women's League, Sakamoto moved to Indonesia to sign with Persija Jakarta Women. Wearing squad number 14, she quickly became a key player for the team, earning individual accolades such as Player of the Match honors.
