= Dewi Tia =

Indonesian footballer

Personal information
- Full name: Dewi Tia Safitri
- Date of birth: 15 March 1998 (age 28)
- Place of birth: Bantul, Indonesia
- Height: 1.62 m (5 ft 4 in)
- Position: Forward

Team information
- Current team: Bekasi City
- Number: 7

Senior career*
Years	Team	Apps	(Gls)
- Pertiwi DIY
2020–2026	Arema Putri		
2026–	Bekasi City	2	(0)

International career^{‡}
2019–	Indonesia	4	(2)
- * Club domestic league appearances and goals ‡ National team caps and goals as of 27 September 2021.

Dewi Tia Safitri (born 15 March 1998) is an Indonesian footballer who plays as a forward for Indonesia Women's League club Bekasi City and the Indonesia national team.

== Club career ==
Tia has played for Arema Putri in Indonesia.

== International career ==
Tia represented Indonesia at the 2022 AFC Women's Asian Cup qualification.

== International goals ==
No.	Date	Venue	Opponent	Score	Result	Competition
1.	20 August 2019	IPE Chonburi Stadium, Chonburi, Thailand	Cambodia	2–0	4–0	2019 AFF Women's Championship
2.	20 August 2019	IPE Chonburi Stadium, Chonburi, Thailand	Cambodia	3–0	4–0	2019 AFF Women's Championship

== Honours ==
=== Club ===
Arema

- Pertiwi Cup 3rd place: 2021–22

=== Individual ===
- Pertiwi Cup top scorer: 2021–22
