= 2019 Liga 1 Putri =

- Season: 2019
- Dates: 5 October – 28 December 2019
- Country: Indonesia
- Teams: 10
- Champions: Persib Putri; 1st Liga 1 Putri title
- Runner up: TIRA-Persikabo Kartini
- Matches: 86
- Goals: 242 (2.81 per match)
- Best player: Reva Octaviani
- Top goalscorer: Insyafadya Salsabillah (14 goals)

The 2019 Liga 1 Putri season was the inaugural season of Liga 1 Putri, the top-flight Indonesian league for women's association football. The season started on 5 October 2019 and finished with two-legged finals on 22 and 28 December 2019.

Persib Putri won the title after defeating TIRA-Persikabo Kartini 6–1 on aggregate.

== Teams ==
Ten teams competed in the league. From the 18 current men's Liga 1 teams, eight didn't field a women's team.

Note: Flags indicate national team as has been defined under FIFA eligibility rules. Players and coaches may hold more than one non-FIFA nationality.

Team	Head coach	Captain
Arema Putri	(Indonesia) Alief Syahrizal	(Indonesia) Serli Anggraini
Bali United Women	(Indonesia) Sandhika Pratama	(Indonesia) I Dewa Ayu Ratna Sari
Galanita Persipura	(Indonesia) Samuel Weya	(Indonesia) Regina Wondo
Persebaya Putri	(Indonesia) Ridwan Anwar	(Indonesia) Lilla Puspita
Persib Putri	(Indonesia) Iwan Bastian	(Indonesia) Een Sumarni
Persija Putri	(Indonesia) John Arwandhi	(Indonesia) Viny Silfianus
PSIS Putri	(Indonesia) Satrio Pratomo	(Indonesia) Hartati
PSM Putri	(Indonesia) Yusrifar Fajar	(Indonesia) Daeng Rosma
PSS Putri	(Indonesia) Yuyud Pujiarto	(Indonesia) Suciana Yuliani
TIRA-Persikabo Kartini	(Indonesia) Adi Kuswanto	(Indonesia) Risda Yulianti

== Schedule and venue ==
The schedule of the competition was as follows:

Stage	Round	Match date		Group A venue	Group B venue
Group stage	Series 1	5–12 October 2019		Maguwoharjo, Sleman	Kusuma Agrowisata, Batu (Note: The series venue was moved from Gelora Brantas to Kusuma Agrowisata because participating teams complained about the pitch condition. Also match between Arema Putri vs Persebaya Putri was held at Pusdik Arhanud Field.)
Group stage	Series 2	19–31 October 2019		Pakansari, Cibinong	Gelora Samudra, Kuta (Note: Three matches was held in Kapten I Wayan Dipta, Gianyar.)
Group stage	Series 3	2–10 November 2019		Pakansari, Cibinong	Cendrawasih, Biak Numfor
Group stage	Series 4	16–22 November 2019		Wibawa Mukti, Cikarang	Gajayana, Malang (Note: The match between Persebaya Putri vs Arema Putri was held at Kanjuruhan Stadium.)
Knockout stage	Semi-finals	1 December 2019	7 December 2019		
Knockout stage	Final	22 December 2019	28 December 2019		

== Group stage ==
The draw for the group stage was held on 8 September 2019 at the Hotel Sultan in Jakarta. The 10 teams are drawn into two groups of five.

In each group, teams played a four-series home tournament with five matches for each series. The winners and runner-ups from each group advanced to semi-finals.

=== Group A ===
Pos	Team	Pld	W	D	L	GF	GA	GD	Pts	Qualification
1	Persib Putri	16	10	4	2	39	9	+30	34	Advanced to the semi-finals
2	TIRA-Persikabo Kartini	16	9	4	3	37	11	+26	31	Advanced to the semi-finals
3	Persija Putri	16	6	3	7	22	34	−12	21	
4	PSS Putri	16	3	5	8	13	30	−17	14	
5	PSIS Putri	16	3	2	11	11	38	−27	11	

Source: PSSI

=== Group B ===
Pos	Team	Pld	W	D	L	GF	GA	GD	Pts	Qualification
1	Galanita Persipura	16	14	1	1	38	9	+29	43	Advanced to the semi-finals
2	Arema Putri	16	11	1	4	26	12	+14	34	Advanced to the semi-finals
3	Bali United Women	16	5	3	8	19	19	0	18	
4	Persebaya Putri	16	4	0	12	10	33	−23	12	
5	PSM Putri	16	3	1	12	6	26	−20	10	

Source: PSSI

== Knockout stage ==
=== Bracket ===
Semi-finals
A1	Persib Putri	2	0	2
B2	Arema Putri	0	0	0
A2	TIRA-Persikabo Kartini	4	3	7
B1	Galanita Persipura	5	0	5

Finals
A1	Persib Putri	3	3	6
A2	TIRA-Persikabo Kartini	0	1	1

=== Semi-finals ===
1 December 2019
16:00 UTC+7

Persib Putri	2–0	Arema Putri
Siti 45'; Mila 59'	Report

Siliwangi Stadium, Bandung
Referee: Achmad Fikriyansyah
7 December 2019
16:00 UTC+7

Arema Putri	0–0	Persib Putri
	Report

Gajayana Stadium, Malang
Referee: Yanuar Dhuma Ardhiyanto

Persib Putri won 2–0 on aggregate.

1 December 2019
16:00 UTC+7

TIRA-Persikabo Kartini	4–5	Galanita Persipura
Insyafadya 4', 55'; Riri 75'; Zimot 77'	Report	Regina 26', 29'; Gerda 33', 52'; Barbalina 90+2'

Pakansari Stadium, Cibinong
Referee: Axel Febrian Sinaga
7 December 2019
15:15 UTC+7

Galanita Persipura	0–3 (Original score was 1–2)	TIRA-Persikabo Kartini
Selly 79'	Report	Baiq 27'; Jesella 68'

Cendrawasih Stadium, Biak Numfor
Referee: Fadli Nurdiana

PSSI Disciplinary Committee awarded a 3–0 win to TIRA-Persikabo Kartini because Galanita Persipura refused to continue the match. TIRA-Persikabo Kartini won 7–5 on aggregate.

=== Finals ===
22 December 2019
19:30 UTC+7

Persib Putri	3–0	TIRA-Persikabo Kartini
Febriana 17'; Tia 45+2'; Siti 77'	Report

Jalak Harupat Stadium, Bandung
Referee: Juandi Hidayatulloh
28 December 2019
15:00 UTC+7

TIRA-Persikabo Kartini	1–3	Persib Putri
Risda 39'	Report	Siti 14'; Febriana 32' (pen.); Reva 64'

Pakansari Stadium, Cibinong
Referee: Bayu Pratama

Persib Putri won 6–1 on aggregate.

== Top goalscorers ==
Rank	Player	Team	Goals
1	(Indonesia) Insyafadya Salsabillah	TIRA-Persikabo Kartini	14
2	(Indonesia) Rulin Aspalek	Galanita Persipura	13
3	(Indonesia) Febriana Kusumaningrum	Persib Putri	12
4	(Indonesia) Sheva Imut	Arema Putri	10
4	(Indonesia) Baiq Amiatun	TIRA-Persikabo Kartini	10
6	(Indonesia) Barbalina Salampessy	Galanita Persipura	9
7	(Indonesia) Siti Latipah Nurul Inayah	Persib Putri	8

== Awards ==
- Fair Play Team: TIRA-Persikabo Kartini
- Best Young Player: Helsya Maeisyaroh (TIRA-Persikabo Kartini)
- Best Player: Reva Octaviani (Persib Putri)
