= Lisa Jacob Zouaoui =

Algerian footballer (born 2005)

- Zouaoui with Persija in 2026

Personal information
- Full name: Lisa Ginette Jacqueline Jacob Zouaoui
- Date of birth: 18 January 2005 (age 21)
- Place of birth: Épinal, France
- Height: 1.67 m (5 ft 6 in)
- Position: Defender

Team information
- Current team: Persija Jakarta
- Number: 4

Youth career
- 2014–2020: Thaon
- 2020–2024: Metz

Senior career*
Years	Team	Apps	(Gls)
2024–2026	Metz	32	(0)
2026–	Persija Jakarta	6	(0)

International career^{‡}
2023	Algeria U20	3	(0)
2025–	Algeria	2	(0)
- * Club domestic league appearances and goals as of 22 November 2026 ‡ National team caps and goals as of 10 October 2026

Lisa Ginette Jacqueline Jacob Zouaoui (Arabic: ليزا جاكوب زواوي; born 18 January 2005) is a professional footballer who plays as a defender for Indonesia Women's League club Persija Jakarta. Born in France, she plays for the Algeria national team.

== Club career ==
=== Early career ===
Zouaoui was born in Épinal, France, and began playing football with ES Thaon. In 2020, she joined the youth academy of FC Metz, where she progressed through the club's under-18 and under-19 teams.

=== FC Metz ===
During the 2024–25 season, Zouaoui progressed to the FC Metz senior team and made her debut in the Seconde Ligue against Toulouse FC on 20 November 2024. She wore the number 17 shirt, which she chose as a tribute to her mother's birthday.

=== Persija Jakarta ===
In 2026, Zouaoui joined Persija Jakarta, competing in the Indonesia Women's League. Persija announced its participation in the 2026–27 Indonesia Women's League in August 2026.

== International career ==
=== Youth ===
In March 2023, Zouaoui was called up to the Algeria under-20 national team for the UNAF Women's Under-20 Tournament, where Algeria faced Egypt. She was subsequently included in preparations for Algeria's 2024 FIFA U-20 Women's World Cup qualifying matches against Mali in July and October 2023.

=== Senior ===
Lisa Jacob with Algeria in 2025

In October 2025, Zouaoui received her first call-up to the senior Algeria women's national team from head coach Farid Benstiti for the team's 2026 Women's Africa Cup of Nations qualifying matches against Cameroon. The following month, she was selected for friendly matches against Kenya. She made her senior international debut on 26 November 2025, appearing in Algeria's 2–1 victory over Kenya at the Mustapha Tchaker Stadium in Blida.

== Career statistics ==
=== Club ===
As of match played 8 May 2026

Appearances and goals by club, season and competition
Club	Season	League			National Cup (Note: Includes Coupe de France Féminine)		League Cup (Note: Includes Coupe LFFP)		Continental		Other		Total	
Club	Season	Division	Apps	Goals	Apps	Goals	Apps	Goals	Apps	Goals	Apps	Goals	Apps	Goals
Metz	2024–25	D2	10	0	—		—		—		0	0	10	0
Metz	2025–26	D2	21	0	—		3	0	—		0	0	25	0
Career total			32	0	—		3	0	–		0	0	35	0

=== International ===
As of match played 2 March 2026

Appearances and goals by national team and year
National team	Year	Apps	Goals
Algeria	2025	1	0
Algeria	2026	1	0
Total		2	0
