= 2008 Indonesian Women's Football Tournament =

Indonesian Women Football Tournament
- Season: 2008
- Matches: 16
- Goals: 113 (7.06 per match)
- Longest winning run: West Java (5 games)
- Longest unbeaten run: West Java (5 games)
- Longest losing run: Central Java; Babel 2 (3 games)

The 2008 Indonesian Women's Football Tournament was the second edition of the Indonesian Women's Football Tournament (IWFT), a fully professional football competition for women in the country.

== Format ==
The competition used a system of home tournament with a host Yogyakarta. Eight teams from six of the thirty-three provinces Indonesian football association board competed in the competition.

The competition began with the group stage, the eight teams being divided into two groups. Each group contained four teams, the winners and runners-up from each group advancing to the semifinals.

The knockout phase began with the semi-finals with the winners advancing to the final. The teams that lost in the semifinals played in a final to decide third place.

Each team was obliged to include a minimum of eight young players under the age of sixteen years. This rule was intended for the development of female football player for the women national team of Indonesian in the future.

== Teams ==
Aceh, West Sumatra, Riau, Riau Islands, Jambi, South Sumatra, Bengkulu, Lampung, North Sumatra, East Java, Bali, West Nusa Tenggara, East Nusa Tenggara, West Kalimantan, Central Kalimantan, South Kalimantan, East Kalimantan, North Sulawesi, Gorontalo, Central Sulawesi, West Sulawesi, South Sulawesi, South East Sulawesi, Maluku, North Maluku and Papua. The teams referred to above did not participate in this edition, because the women's football teams in the area were unprepared.

=== Group stage ===
==== Group A ====
Rank	Team	Pld	W	D	L	GF	GA	GD	Pts
1	Yogyakarta 1	3	3	0	0	28	1	+27	9
2	Wondama Bay (West Papua)	3	2	0	1	21	3	+18	6
3	Babel 1	3	1	0	2	18	11	-7	3
4	Central Java	3	0	0	3	0	50	-50	0

==== Group B ====
Rank	Team	Pld	W	D	L	GF	GA	GD	Pts
1	West Java	3	3	0	0	19	0	+19	9
2	Jakarta	3	2	0	1	8	6	+2	6
3	Yogyakarta 2	3	1	0	2	6	4	+2	3
4	Babel 2	3	0	0	3	2	25	-23	0

Key to colours in group tables
Top two placed teams advance to the semifinal

=== Knockout phase ===
Semi-finals
1 August 2008 - GOR Ragunan
Yogyakarta 1	1
Jawa Barat	5
2 August 2008 - GOR Ragunan
TW Papua Barat
D.I. Yogyakarta 2

Final
3 August 2008 - GOR Ragunan
Jawa Barat	3
D.I. Yogyakarta 2	2
Third place
3 August 2008 - GOR Ragunan
TW Papua Barat	4
D.I. Yogyakarta 1	2
