= Women's football in Indonesia =

- Country: Indonesia
- Governing body: PSSI
- National team: Women's national team

National competitions
- Pertiwi Cup

Club competitions
- Liga 1 Putri

Women's football in Indonesia is not popular but is mainly played in affluent areas in Indonesia.

One of the barriers of the sport growing is that many women experience prejudice for playing the sport.

In December 2017, Women's Football Association of Indonesia (ASBWI) was created in their first congress in Palembang.

In 2019 Liga 1 Putri was launched as the top-flight women's football league in Indonesia.

== See also ==
- Football in Indonesia
- Indonesia women's national football team
