= Bali United W.F.C. =

Indonesian football club

Bali United Women
- Full name: Bali United Women Football Club
- Nickname: Srikandi Tridatu
- Founded: 3 October 2019; 7 years ago
- Ground: Gelora Samudra Stadium; Kapten I Wayan Dipta Stadium
- Chairman: Pieter Tanuri
- Head coach: Sandhika Pratama
- League: Liga 1 Putri
- 2019: Liga 1 Putri, 3rd in group stage
- Website: www.baliutd.com
Home colours	Away colours	Third colours

Bali United Women Football Club is a women's association football club based in Gianyar, Bali, Indonesia. Founded in 2019, the club is affiliated with men's professional association football club Bali United. It was established in 2019 as part of PSSI's efforts to foster women's football in Indonesia. The team played in Liga 1 Putri in 2019.

== History ==
In July 2019, Bali United announced their commitment to take part in the inaugural season of Liga 1 Putri, a women's football competition in Indonesia and formed a women's football team. Bali United Women Football Club were officially introduced on 3 October 2019. Sandhika Pratama was appointed as the club's first head coach, with their inaugural 25-player squad announced on the same day.

The nickname Srikandi Tridatu is taken from the name of Srikandi, one of the figures in the Mahabharata epic. Srikandi is the daughter of the king of the Panchala Kingdom, who later became a hero in the Bharatayuddha war. The figure of the Srikandi knight is expected to be played by Bali United Women players while on the field.

The team's first game back was on 6 October 2019, where they draw 1–1 against PSM Putri in the Liga 1 Putri, with Fitriya Hilda scoring their first competitive goal.

== 2020 squad ==
As of 23 November 2020

Note: Flags indicate national team as defined under FIFA eligibility rules; some limited exceptions apply. Players may hold more than one non-FIFA nationality.

No.	Pos.	Nation	Player
1	GK	IDN	Putu Suarni
3	FW	IDN	Vina Andaratih
4	MF	IDN	Ni Kadek Novi Aryani
5	FW	IDN	Rizky Amalia Putri
6	DF	IDN	Nur Laili Khomariyah Purnama
7	DF	IDN	Aryndha Christyana Rachmawatie
8	FW	IDN	Hamida Kurnia Dewi
9	MF	IDN	I Dewa Ayu Ratna Sari (captain)
10	FW	IDN	Mey Putri Selpia Husiana
11	FW	IDN	Syenida Meryfandina
13	MF	IDN	Sabrina Mutiara
14	MF	IDN	Fifit Marlena

No.	Pos.	Nation	Player
16	MF	IDN	Ni Wayan Anggita Putri Darmianti
17	DF	IDN	Fitriya Hilda
18	FW	IDN	Natasya Anggraini Sumitro
19	DF	IDN	Ayu Lidya Agustin Meok
20	GK	IDN	Noor Isniwati Berliana
21	GK	IDN	Ranti Lestari Salimi
22	FW	IDN	Ni Made Rika Utari Dewi
24	MF	IDN	Rika Mai Wulandari Idris
25	MF	IDN	Desy Natalia
26	FW	IDN	Luh Made Juwita Somayani
27	FW	IDN	Herliana
30	FW	IDN	Runi Sulistia Oktari

== Club officials ==
Position	Name
Manager	(Indonesia) Richie Kurniawan
Assistant Manager	(Indonesia) Himar Galih Dharmasaputra
Head coach	(Indonesia) Sandhika Pratama
Assistant coach	(Indonesia) Muhammad Imron (Indonesia) Wijang Kinanjar
Goalkeeping coach	(Indonesia) Eddy Harto
Team doctor	(Indonesia) I Nyoman Endi Ananda Khrisna
Physiotherapist	(Indonesia) Desak Putu Rina Jayanti
