= Clairefontaine =

Clairefontaine may refer to:

- INF Clairefontaine, France national football centre
- CNFE Clairefontaine, France national women's football centre
- Clairefontaine-en-Yvelines, commune in the Yvelines department of the Île-de-France region in north-central France
- Étival-Clairefontaine, commune in the Vosges department in Grand Est in northeastern France
- Clairefontaine paper mills, French paper company
- Clairefontaine Abbey, Belgian hamlet belonging to the city of Arlon

== See also ==
- Clairfontaine, commune in the Aisne department of the Hauts-de-France region in northern France
