= Women's Football Association of Indonesia =

Football association in Indonesia

- Founded: 7 December 2017; 8 years ago
- Location: Indonesia
- President: Nadalsyah
- Vice-President: Monica Desideria
- General Secretary: Souraiya Farina
- Website: asbwi.com

Women's Football Association of Indonesia (Indonesian: Asosiasi Sepak Bola Wanita Indonesia; abbreviated as ASBWI) is the governing body for women's association football in Indonesia. Since 2017, this organization has been recognized as member of the Football Association of Indonesia (PSSI).

This association is one of three associations under PSSI, besides the Indonesia Futsal Federation (FFI) and the Indonesian Coaches Association.

== History ==
The association was founded on 7 December 2017 at their first congress in Palembang, South Sumatra. It was founded when PSSI Chairman Edy Rahmayadi and General Secretary Ratu Tisha led the Football Association of Indonesia (PSSI). Papat Yunisal, a former women's national team player in the 80s, was elected as the first president. Yunisal was replaced by North Barito regent, Nadalsyah, in 2021.

=== List of presidents ===
| President | Period | Ref. |
|---|---|---|
| Papat Yunisal | 2017–2021 | |
| Nadalsyah | 2021– | |

== See also ==
- Women's football in Indonesia
- Indonesia women's national football team
