= 2014 Pertiwi Cup =

- Season: 2014
- Champions: Papua 2
- Top goalscorer: Henny Yigibalom (9 goals)

The 2014 Pertiwi Cup season is the fourth edition of Pertiwi Cup. The season is scheduled to begin in August 2014, but in the end PSSI decided that the competition will begin on 12 September 2014 and ends on 21 September 2014.

== Group stage ==
=== Group A ===
Team	Pld	W	D	L	GF	GA	GD	Pts
East Java	2	2	0	0	24	3	+21	6
Yogyakarta	2	1	0	1	5	5	0	3
Central Java 1	2	0	0	2	1	22	−21	0

== Knockout stage ==
Semi-finals
19 September 2014 – Jakarta
East Java	0
Papua 1	2
19 September 2014 – Jakarta
Bangka Belitung	1
Papua 2	2

Final
21 September 2014 – Jakarta
Papua 1	0
Papua 2	2
Third place
21 September 2014 – Jakarta
East Java	1
Bangka Belitung	0

=== Semi-finals ===
19 September 2014
09:30

East Java	0 – 2	Papua 1
	Report	Feibe Pekey 39'; Gerda Warkis 65'

Senayan field, Jakarta
19 September 2014
16:00

Bangka Belitung	0 – 2	Papua 2
Goal	Report	Henny Yigibalom

Senayan field, Jakarta

=== Third place play-off ===
21 September 2014
09:30

East Java	1 – 0	Bangka Belitung
Vina Andaratih 15'	Report

Senayan field, Jakarta

=== Final ===
21 September 2014
16:00

Papua 1	0 – 2	Papua 2
	Report	Leni Gombo 9'; Emy Awes 40'

Senayan field, Jakarta
Attendance: 350

== Top scorers ==
Rank	Scorer	Club	Goals
1	(Indonesia) Henny Yigibalom	Papua	9
2	(Indonesia) Vina Andaratih	East Java	7
3	(Indonesia) Akudiana Tebay	East Java	5
