= Nguyen Dinh Duc =

Vietnamese mechanical/materials scientist

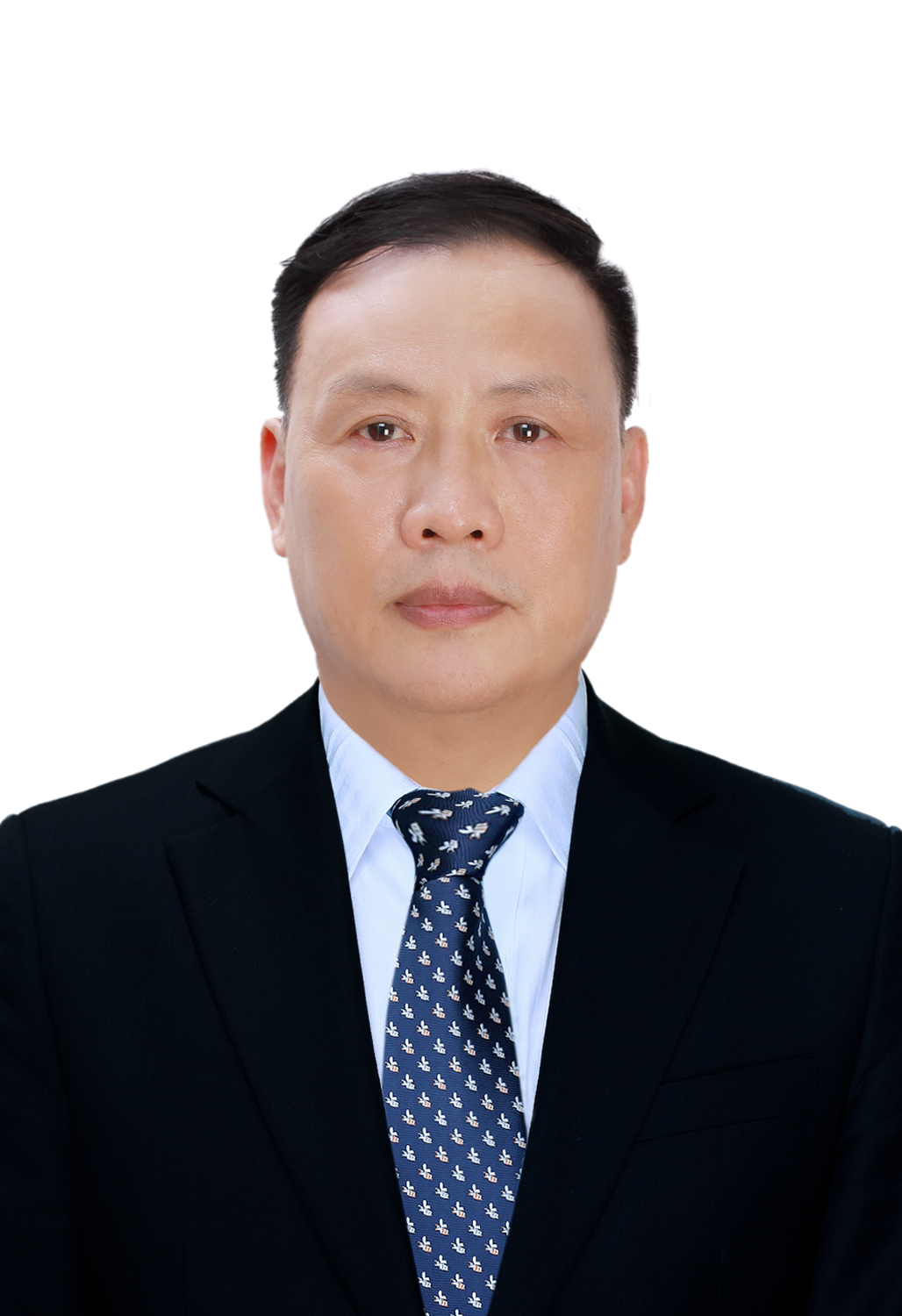
- Born: Hanoi, Vietnam
- Scientific career
- Workplaces: Professor of the University of Engineering and Technology, Vietnam National University Vietnam National University, Hanoi

Nguyen Dinh Duc (Nguyễn Đình Đức) (born 1963) is a Vietnamese scientist who is a full professor, member of the Central Committee of the Vietnam Fatherland Front XI-th Term (2026–2031), and former first the Chairman of the University Council at the University of Engineering and Technology, Vietnam National University, Hanoi. He has made contributions in the field of new materials, particularly composites, Advanced Materials and Structures.

Duc is the vice-president of the Vietnamese Association of Mechanics and President of the Network Club for Ensuring the Quality of Higher Education in Vietnam. He is known for his contributions in the field of new materials.

== Early life and education ==
Nguyen Dinh Duc was born in his maternal hometown of Lai Xa village, Kim Chung commune, Hoai Duc district (former Ha Tay province), now part of Hanoi. His paternal hometown is Hue Tri village, An Phu commune, Kinh Mon district, Hai Duong province.

His childhood and schooling years are closely associated with Yen Bai, a mountainous town in the northwest. He is a former specialized mathematics student in the first class of Hoang Lien Son province (1977–1980).

Duc graduated from Hanoi National University in 1984, PhD at Moscow State University in 1990 and Dr.Sci (Dr. habilitation) at the Russian Academy of Sciences in 1997. Academician of the Russian Academy of Natural Sciences since 1999.

== Career ==
According to the worldwide ranking of the most influential scientists published by the PloS Biology journal, Duc is working in Vietnam to make the top 10,000 scientists with the most influential index since 2019–present, and the top 100 – at 74th in the rankings of leading scientists globally in the field of Engineering and Technology in 2024, and rise to top 51st ranking in the world in this field by 2025. ,.

At VNU University of Engineering and Technology, Duc established the research group and Laboratory for Advanced Materials and Structures, supervising students in engineering mechanics and composite materials.

Duc has been awarded the Third-Class Labor Medal (2016) and the Second-Class Labor Medal (2022) by the President of the Socialist Republic of Vietnam. He was also recognized by the Ministry of Education and Training as an outstanding educator on the occasion of the 40th anniversary of the education sector (1982–2022) and honored as an outstanding Vietnamese scientist in science and technology in 2024.

In 1999, Duc was elected as a Foreign Academician of the Russian Academy of Natural Sciences. He also served as a member of the Central Committee of the Vietnam Fatherland Front for its fifth term (1999–2004), X-th term (2024–2026) and XI-th term (2026–2031). Duc has been an official delegate to the National Congress of Emulation Heroes three times: the V-th (2000), the X-th (2020) and the XI-th (2025) in Hanoi.

Since 2019, Duc has been ranked among the top 10,000 most influential scientists worldwide for seven consecutive years, and in 2025, he advanced to the top 51 globally in the field of engineering.

== Awards ==
- Third Prize of Vietnam Talent in 2008 for the project "Research and manufacture of inertial navigation system for controlled vehicles".
- Award "Lecturer of Hanoi National University" in 2022, Award "For the cause of education" of IMG Group in 2022.
- Bao Son Award in 2024 in the field of Engineering - Technology for the project "Advanced 3-phase composite materials applied in Engineering and Technology".

== Publications ==
Duc has published over 400 international and national articles as well as scientific works, including over 250 research papers in ISI listed international journals. He has written 06 textbooks and monographs in Vietnamese, Russian and English - using for the undergraduate and graduate programs. One monograph about 3D, 4D composites had been published in Russian (Russian Publisher – USSR, 2000) and two other – about static and dynamic stability of FGMs structures and nonlinear vibration of auxetic plates and shells – have been published in English (VNU, Hanoi Publisher, 2014, 2021).

- Nguyen Dinh Duc, The sphero-fibers composite with space structure, URSS Publishing House, Moscow, Russia, 2000, 242 pages (Monograph, in Russian).
- Nguyen Hoa Thinh, Nguyen Dinh Duc, Composite materials – Mechanics and Technology of manufacture, Science and Technics Publishing House, Hanoi, Vietnam, 2002, 364 pages (Monograph).
- Nguyen Dinh Duc, Dao Nhu Mai, Strength of the Materials and Structures. Vietnam National University Press, Hanoi, 2012, 292 pages (Text book).
- Nguyen Dinh Duc, Nonlinear Static and Dynamic Stability of Functionally Graded Plates and Shells. Vietnam National University Press, Hanoi, 2014, 724 pages (Monograph, in English).
- Nguyen Dinh Duc, Tran Quoc Quan, Pham Hong Cong. Nonlinear Vibration of Auxetic Plates and Shells. Vietnam National University Press, Hanoi, 2021, 376 pages (Monograph, in English).
- Nguyen Dinh Duc, Vu Thi Thuy Anh. Mechanics of Deformed Solid. Vietnam National University Press, Hanoi, 2022, 374 pages (Text book).
