= Pertiwi (surname) =

Pertiwi is an Indonesian surname. Notable people with the surname include:

- Elfin Pertiwi Rappa (born 1995), Indonesian beauty pageant titleholder
- Indah Dewi Pertiwi (born 1991), Indonesian singer, dancer, and artist
