= Kieran Bradley =

Filipino footballer (born 2008)

Personal information
- Full name: Kieran Leyla Honra Bradley
- Date of birth: January 12, 2008 (age 18)
- Place of birth: Cary, North Carolina, U.S.
- Height: 5 ft 8 in (1.73 m)
- Positions: Forward; attacking midfielder

Team information
- Current team: Xavier Musketeers
- Number: 11

Youth career
- Wilmington Hammerheads
- Ashley Screaming Eagles

College career
Years	Team	Apps	(Gls)
2026–	Xavier Musketeers	20	(4)

International career^{‡}
2024	Philippines U17	4	(0)
- ‡ National team caps and goals as of 12 May 2024

Kieran Leyla Honra Bradley (born January 12, 2008) is a footballer who plays as a forward or attacking midfielder for the Xavier Musketeers. Born in the United States, she has represented the Philippines at youth international level.

== Early life ==
Bradley currently attends Eugene Ashley High School in Wilmington, North Carolina, where she plays for the Screaming Eagles varsity soccer team. As a freshman, Bradley scored 23 goals and had nine assists to help her team win the NCHSAA 4A East Regional championship securing a berth to the state finals. She was named All-Region First Team. As a sophomore, Bradley helped the Screaming Eagles win their second straight 4A Regional championship 2–1 over Hoggard, scoring one goal in the East Regional final and helped lead her team to their second consecutive state championship appearance. She played club soccer for Wilmington Hammerheads Youth FC and helped her team advance to ECNL Playoffs in 2023 and 2024 where she was named ECNL Mid-Atlantic All-Conference First Team in both years.

== International career ==
In January 2024, Bradley was called up for Philippines U-17 team and made her international debut on February 5, 2024 as a starter in a friendly match at 2024 MIMA Cup in Spain against England U-17. She also started in a friendly against Sweden U-17.

In May 2024, Bradley was selected as part of the Philippines U17 squad for the 2024 AFC U-17 Women's Asian Cup in Bali, Indonesia. During a game against Indonesia U-17, she made an assist to Jael-Marie Guy's goal in the 22nd minute for the Philippines to take the 2–1 lead. The Philippines later won the match 6–1.
