= Persebaya Putri =

- Full name: Persatuan Sepakbola Surabaya Putri
- Nicknames: Women in Green (team); Bonek and Bonita (supporters)
- Short name: PSBY, SBY
- Founded: 2019
- Owners: Koperasi Surya Abadi Persebaya (30%); PT DBL Indonesia (70%)
- President: Azrul Ananda
- Head coach: Ridwan Anwar
- League: Liga 1 Putri
- 2019: Group Stage (B): 4th Overall: 9th
- Website: http://www.persebaya.id
Home colours	Away colours	Third colours

Persebaya Putri (English: Persebaya Women's) is an Indonesia professional women's football club based in Surabaya, East Java, Indonesia. It played in the Liga 1 Putri, the top women's league in Indonesia in 2019.

The team is associated with Persebaya Surabaya.

== History ==
In July 2019, Persebaya announced their commitment to take part in the inaugural season of Liga 1 Putri, a women's football competition in Indonesia and formed a women's football team.

On Friday, 27 September 2019, Persebaya decided to resign after sending a letter to PSSI to postpone participation in the 2019 Liga 1 Putri. The plan was that the Women in Green would enter the competition next year. But Persebaya finally decided to take part in the 2019 Liga 1 Putri. The obligation of every Liga 1 team to take part in the women's competition next season was taken into consideration.

== Players ==
=== Current squad ===
As of 3 October 2019

Note: Flags indicate national team as defined under FIFA eligibility rules; some limited exceptions apply. Players may hold more than one non-FIFA nationality.

No.	Pos.	Nation	Player
1	GK	IDN	Nabilla Ghassani
2		IDN	Dayinta Tiara
3		IDN	Fara Ninda
4		IDN	Wahyuni Hartati
5		IDN	Feni Norrahmah
6		IDN	Ellen Tira
7		IDN	Dini Hindrayati
8		IDN	Sintia Nur
9		IDN	Nabillah Azzah
10		IDN	Reira Faizah
11		IDN	Devi Malika
12		IDN	Berliana Mustika
13		IDN	Izha Lely

No.	Pos.	Nation	Player
14		IDN	Adinda Nur
15		IDN	Lilla Puspita
16		IDN	Irma Bita
17		IDN	Ratih Ginanjar
18		IDN	Maya Dwi Pratiwi
19		IDN	Citra Ramadhani
20		IDN	Dianita Ajeng
21		IDN	Yayuk
22		IDN	Nabila Fitriah
23		IDN	Amadea
24		IDN	Cici Santika
25		IDN	Manda Prima
