= Rani Mulyasari =

Indonesian footballer (born 1994)

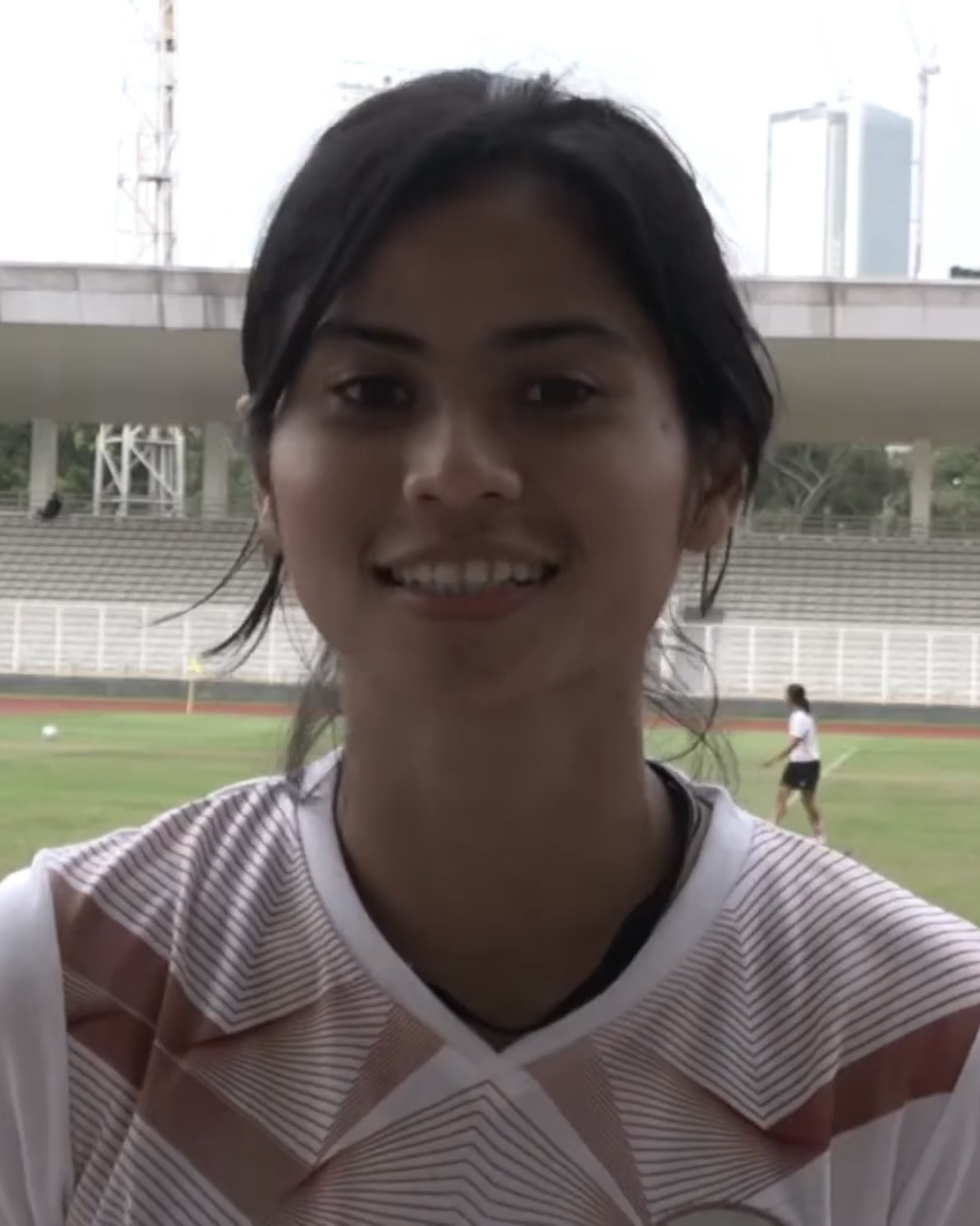
- Mulyasari training with Indonesia in 2022

Personal information
- Date of birth: 4 March 1994 (age 32)
- Place of birth: Tangerang, Indonesia
- Height: 1.57 m (5 ft 2 in)
- Position: Midfielder

Team information
- Current team: Muara Enim United (futsal)
- Number: 10

Senior career*
Years	Team	Apps	(Gls)
- Persiba Balikpapan
- Muara Enim United (futsal)

International career^{‡}
2018–2023	Indonesia	13	(1)
- Indonesia (futsal)
- * Club domestic league appearances and goals ‡ National team caps and goals as of 27 January 2022.

Rani Mulyasari (born 4 March 1994) is an Indonesian footballer who plays a midfielder for Persiba Putri and the Indonesia women's national team.

== Club career ==
Mulyasari has played for Persiba Putri in Indonesia.

== International career ==
Mulyasari represented Indonesia at the 2022 AFC Women's Asian Cup.

== Career statistics ==
International

As of match played 2 December 2019.
Indonesia score listed first, score column indicates score after each Mulyasari goal

List of international goals scored by Rani Mulyasari
No.	Date	Venue	Opponent	Score	Result	Competition
1	2 December 2019	Rizal Memorial Stadium, Manila, Philippines	Thailand	1–5	1–5	2019 Southeast Asian Games
