= Galanita Persipura =

- Full name: Gabungan Sepakbola Wanita Persipura
- Nicknames: Srikandi Mutiara Hitam (Heroine Black Pearls)
- Founded: 5 May 2019; 7 years ago
- Ground: Tolikara Regency
- Owner: PT Persipura Jayapura
- Head coach: Samuel Weya
- League: Liga 1 Putri
- 2019: Group Stage (B): 1st Overall: 3rd (semi-finalists)
Home colours	Away colours

Active departments of Persipura
Football	Football (Women's)	Football U-20 (Men's)
Football U-18 (Men's)	Football U-16 (Men's)

Gabungan Sepakbola Wanita Persipura or Galanita Persipura is an Indonesia professional women's football club based in Tolikara, Papua Province, Indonesia. Founded in 2019, the club is affiliated with men's professional association football club Persipura. It played in the Liga 1 Putri, the top women's league in Indonesia in 2019.

== History ==
In July 2019, Persipura Jayapura announced their commitment to take part in the inaugural season of Liga 1 Putri, a women's football competition in Indonesia and formed a women's football team.

== Players ==
=== Current squad ===
As of 3 October 2019

Note: Flags indicate national team as defined under FIFA eligibility rules; some limited exceptions apply. Players may hold more than one non-FIFA nationality.

No.	Pos.	Nation	Player
