= Persija Jakarta (women) =

Persija Jakarta Women
- Full name: Persatuan Sepakbola Indonesia Jakarta Putri
- Nicknames: None Macan (Lady Tigers)
- Short name: PSJ
- Founded: 2019; 7 years ago
- Ground: Persija Training Ground
- Owner: PT Persija Jaya Jakarta
- Director: Mohamad Prapanca
- Head coach: Ricky Nelson
- League: Indonesia Women’s League
- 2019: Liga 1 Putri (Group A), 3rd
- Website: http://persija.id
Home colours	Away colours

Persatuan Sepakbola Indonesia Jakarta Putri abbreviated as Persija Putri or Persija Women is an Indonesian professional women's football team based in Jakarta, Indonesia. The club was founded in 2019 and plays in the Indonesia Women's League, the top women's league in Indonesia. Persija Women were a founding member of the Liga 1 Putri in 2019 and affiliated with Super League team Persija.

== History ==
=== Formation and Liga 1 Putri (2019) ===
Persija Jakarta's women's team, known as Persija Putri, was formed to participate in the inaugural season of Liga 1 Putri, Indonesia's national women's football competition, in 2019. The team was coached by John Arwandhi and featured forward Mayang Z.P. and Indonesian international Zahra Muzdalifah among its players. Persija began their campaign on 6 October 2019 with a 4–1 victory over PSIS Semarang, with Mayang scoring a hat-trick and Zahra adding the other goal.

Persija competed in Group A alongside Persib Bandung, TIRA-Persikabo Kartini, PSS Sleman and PSIS Semarang. The team initially performed well, finishing the first series at the top of the group standings after recording three wins and one draw. On 10 October 2019, Persija defeated PSS Sleman 3–1, with Mayang scoring all three goals to complete a successful first series.

However, Persija were unable to maintain their early momentum throughout the competition. They finished third in Group A with 21 points from 16 matches, recording six wins, three draws and seven defeats. The team consequently failed to qualify for the knockout stage, as only the top two teams in each group advanced to the semi-finals.

=== Return to Competition (2026–present) ===
After a lengthy hiatus in national women's league football following the 2019 season, Persija Jakarta announced their return to the women's game through participation in the inaugural Indonesia Women's League (IWL) for the 2026–27 season. The club confirmed its participation on 11 August 2026, describing the move as part of its commitment to providing competitive opportunities for female footballers and contributing to the development of women's football in Indonesia.

The 2026–27 Indonesia Women's League began in October 2026 and featured six clubs competing in a centralised triple round-robin format, in which each team would face every other team three times. Persija played their opening match against Bekasi City on 18 October 2026, drawing 1–1. Their participation marked the club's return to national league competition in women's football after seven years without a league season.

== Players ==
As of 24 October 2026

Note: Flags indicate national team as defined under FIFA eligibility rules; some limited exceptions apply. Players may hold more than one non-FIFA nationality.

No.	Pos.	Nation	Player
2	DF	IDN	Manda Prima Saleppang
3	DF	IDN	Anggita Oktaviani
4	DF	ALG	Lisa Jacob (3rd captain)
5	DF	IDN	Dian Fitri
6	FW	IDN	Sopiah Solihat
7	MF	IDN	Anggi Puspita Sari
8	MF	JPN	Saki Nishihara
9	FW	IDN	Ajeng Sri Handayani
10	MF	IDN	Nafeeza Nori
11	DF	IDN	Sabreena Dressler
12	DF	IDN	May Fyra Egawulantary
14	MF	JPN	Michika Sakamoto

No.	Pos.	Nation	Player
17	DF	IDN	Vivi Oktavia (vice-captain)
18	FW	IDN	Shifana Rizka Nadhifa
19	MF	IDN	Nasywa Rambe
20	DF	IDN	Nabila Saputri
21	GK	IDN	Fathiya Salsabila Nur Aini
22	DF	IDN	Sola Gratia Mananohas
23	GK	IDN	Edelweiz Auradiva
27	FW	SKN	Christi-Anne Mills
28	GK	IDN	Mutmainah
29	MF	IDN	Risa Afriyani Ulfa (captain)
31	MF	IDN	Dila Husna Fauziah
39	FW	IDN	Kikka Putri Ramadani
99	FW	IDN	Keyssya Anastassya

== Coaches & staffs ==
The following is a list of coaches and staffs of Persija Jakarta women’s team for the 2026–27 season.

Position	Name
Head coach	(Indonesia) Ricky Nelson
Team manager	(Indonesia) Diky Soemarno
Assistant coach	(Indonesia) Aji Riduan
Goalkeeping coach	(Indonesia) Irfan Nurmansyah
Fitness coach	(Indonesia) Lingga Saputra
Analyst	(Indonesia) Yusron Yazid
Assistant team manager	(Indonesia) Ahmad Rizal
Team secretary	(Indonesia) Wandiati Yorania
Physiotherapist	(Indonesia) Putri Razita
Masseur	(Indonesia) Sundari Putri
Kitman	(Indonesia) Rahmad Hidayat
Kitman	(Indonesia) Andri Fadjri

== Season-by-season records ==
Season(s)	League	Tier	Tms.	Pos.
2019	Liga 1 Putri	1	10	3rd, Group A
2026–27	Indonesia Women's League	1	6	TBD

== Sponsors ==
The following sponsors support Persija Jakarta women for the 2026-2027 season.

• PAM Jaya
• Macan Kemayoran
• IKL
• Bank Jakarta
• Adidas

== Affiliated teams ==
- Persija Jakarta (men’s main team)
- Persija Jakarta U-20 (men’s youth team)
- Persija Muda (men’s satellite team)
