= PSM Putri =

Indonesian football club

PSM Makassar Putri
- Full name: Persatuan Sepakbola Makassar Putri
- Nicknames: Beccena PSM (team); The Macz Man, Laskar Ayam Jantan, Red Gank, CSM and KVS (supporters)
- Founded: 2019
- Owner: PT Persaudaraan Sepak Bola Makassar
- Chairman: Sadikin Aksa
- Head coach: Yusrifar Djafar
- League: Liga 1 Putri
- 2019: Group Stage (B): 5th Overall: 10th
- Website: www.psmmakassar.co.id
Home colours	Away colours	Third colours

PSM Makassar Putri (English: PSM Makassar Women's) is an Indonesia professional women's football club based in Makassar, Indonesia. Founded in 2019, the club is affiliated with men's professional association football club PSM Makassar. It played in the Liga 1 Putri, the top women's league in Indonesia in 2019.

== History ==
In July 2019, PSM Makassar announced their commitment to take part in the inaugural season of Liga 1 Putri, a first professional women's football competition in Indonesia and formed 25 players including 3 players taken from Palembang, Indonesia. The player was selected by trial match by selection campaign 3 days in a row at Telkom Pettarani football field in Makassar.

The teams also did some trial match in same field with local U-15 Man football teams after completed players selection.

== Players ==
=== Current squad ===
As of 30 October 2019

Note: Flags indicate national team as defined under FIFA eligibility rules; some limited exceptions apply. Players may hold more than one non-FIFA nationality.

No.	Pos.	Nation	Player
1	GK	IDN	Vivi Novia Eka
5	MF	IDN	Uswatun Hasanah
6	DF	IDN	Daeng Rosma (Captain)
7	DF	IDN	Eva Faulina
9	FW	IDN	Magdalena Unyat
10	MF	IDN	Austin Melan
11	DF	IDN	Nur Fitra Kariutang
13	FW	IDN	Marselia
14	MF	IDN	Mitha Nur Fajriana
15	FW	IDN	Sulfiati
17	DF	IDN	Nupus Piani Ningsih

No.	Pos.	Nation	Player
19	FW	IDN	Sri Angela Ninia
20	GK	IDN	Sri Muliana
21	MF	IDN	Stelvani Marampa
22	MF	IDN	Jessica Virginia (Vice-captain)
24	MF	IDN	Niclatus Sholeha
25	MF	IDN	Yuliani Wijaya
26	MF	IDN	Marlinawati
27	DF	IDN	Sri Megawati Putri
31	DF	IDN	Fitriani Nur
80	DF	IDN	Dwi Septiani
89	DF	IDN	Rizky Dwy Ekawati
99	GK	IDN	Andi Putri Handayani

== Club officials ==
=== Coaching staff ===
As of October 2019.

Position	Name
Manager	(Indonesia) Marlina
Head coach	(Indonesia) Yusrifar Djafar
Assistant coach	(Indonesia) Rizki Dwi Handari
Goalkeeping coach	(Indonesia) Ansar Abdullah
Physical coach	(Indonesia) Muhammad Akmal Almy
Doctor	(Indonesia) dr. Hutami Citrasari Herman
Physioteraphy	(Indonesia) Antonia Rainata Kuswikan
Photographer	(Indonesia) Capt. Muhammad Rahmat Basalamah
Kitman	(Indonesia) Sunardi Una
