= Arema F.C. Women =

Arema FC Putri
- Full name: Arema Football Club Women
- Nickname: Singo Wedok (Lionesses)
- Founded: 2 October 2019; 7 years ago
- Ground: Kanjuruhan Stadium; Gajayana Stadium
- Owner: PT Arema Aremania Bersatu Berprestasi Indonesia
- Head Coach: Nanang Habibi
- League: Liga 1 Putri
- 2019: Group Stage (B): 2nd Overall: 4th (semi-finalists)
- Website: www.aremafc.com
Home colours	Away colours	Third colours

Arema Football Club Putri (English: Arema FC Women) is an Indonesia professional women's football club based in Malang, East Java, Indonesia. Founded in 2019, the club is affiliated with men's professional association football club Arema FC. It played in the Liga 1 Putri, the top women's league in Indonesia in 2019.

== History ==
In July 2019, Arema FC announced their commitment to take part in the inaugural season of Liga 1 Putri, a women's football competition in Indonesia and formed a women's football team. Arema Football Club Putri were officially introduced on 2 October 2019 at the Kanjuruhan Stadium during the Arema match against PSM Makassar in the competition Liga 1. Alief Syahrizal was appointed as the club's first head coach, with their inaugural 24-player squad announced on the same day.

The nickname for Arema FC Putri is Ongis Kodew (Lionesses). Ongis is a language from Malang which means singo (lion in Javanese). Since a long time ago the lion was an icon of the city of Malang. While Kodew is the slang of wedok (women in Javanese). There have been several color changes from Arema FC Putri, but the official colors of the Arema Putri club are blues and red.

The team's first game back was on 6 October 2019, where they lost 0–1 against Galanita Persipura in the Liga 1 Putri.

== Honours ==
=== League ===
- Liga 1

Semi-finalist: 2019

=== Cup ===
- Women Sriwijaya FC Championship

Winner: 2021

- Pertiwi Cup:

Regional (East Java)

Winners: 2022, 2025

National

3rd place: 2022

- DKI Jakarta Governor Cup

Winner: 2022

- Regent of Malang Cup

Winner: 2022

== Players ==
=== Current squad ===
As of 23 November 2020

Note: Flags indicate national team as defined under FIFA eligibility rules; some limited exceptions apply. Players may hold more than one non-FIFA nationality.

No.	Pos.	Nation	Player
1	GK	IDN	Windi Ayu Puspitasari
3	DF	IDN	Syafira Azzahra Ramadhanti
4	MF	IDN	Alzahna Firzalvia
5	FW	IDN	Sabrina Mutiara
6	DF	IDN	Serli Anggraini (captain)
7	FW	IDN	Asmina Kogoya
8	MF	IDN	Febri Anita Eka Putri Cahyo
9	FW	IDN	Yuniar Herawati
10	FW	IDN	Regina Tiofanny Herdiyanta
11	FW	IDN	Dianita Ajeng Astiwi
12	FW	IDN	Jasmine Sefia Waynie Cahyono
—	MF	IDN	Putri Becham

No.	Pos.	Nation	Player
13	DF	IDN	Shafira Ika Putri Kartini
14	DF	IDN	Eka Nurul Permatasari
15	MF	IDN	Riskyi Rahmadhani
17	DF	IDN	Ariska Kusumaningtyas
18	MF	IDN	Susi Susanti
19	GK	IDN	Laita Ro'ati Masykuroh
20	MF	IDN	Rachmayanti Indah Ma'ruf
21	DF	IDN	Pradea Syawella Wati
23	MF	IDN	Nova Sofi Pertiwi
87	FW	IDN	Anisya Widyawati
—	MF	IDN	Ratri Cahyawati Titannia
—	MF	IDN	Ade Mustikiana

== Head coaches ==
Head Coach by years (2019–present)

Years	Name
2019–2020	(Indonesia) Alief Syahrizal
2020–	(Indonesia) Nanang Habibi
