= Persib Putri =

- Full name: Perserikatan Sepakbola Indonesia Bandung Putri
- Nicknames: Putri Biru (Blue Princesses)
- Founded: 2019; 7 years ago
- Ground: Various
- Owner: PT Persib Bandung Bermartabat
- President: Glenn Timothy Sugita
- Head coach: Iwan Bastian
- League: Liga 1 Putri
- Website: www.persib.co.id
Home colours	Away colours	Third colours

Persib Putri (English: Persib Women) (also known as Persib Putri Bandung) is an Indonesian professional women's football club based in Bandung, West Java. Founded in 2019, the club is affiliated with men's professional association football club Persib Bandung. It played in the Liga 1 Putri, the top women's league in Indonesia in 2019.

== History ==
In July 2019, Persib announced their commitment to take part in the inaugural season of Liga 1 Putri, a women's football competition in Indonesia and formed a women's football team.
