= 2022–23 Chelsea F.C. season =

English football club season

Chelsea
2022–23 season
- Owner: BlueCo
- Chairman: Todd Boehly
- Head coach: Thomas Tuchel (until 7 September); Graham Potter (from 8 September to 2 April); Bruno Saltor (caretaker, from 2 to 6 April); Frank Lampard (interim, from 6 April to 28 May)
- Stadium: Stamford Bridge
- Premier League: 12th
- FA Cup: Third round
- EFL Cup: Third round
- UEFA Champions League: Quarter-finals
- Top goalscorer: League: Kai Havertz (7); All: Kai Havertz; Raheem Sterling (9 each)
- Highest home attendance: 40,152 vs Southampton, 18 February 2023, Premier League
- Lowest home attendance: 38,882 vs Borussia Dortmund, 7 March 2023, UEFA Champions League
- Average home league attendance: 39,969
- Biggest win: 3–0 vs Milan (H), 5 October 2022, UEFA Champions League; 3–0 vs Wolverhampton Wanderers (H), 8 October 2022, Premier League
- Biggest defeat: 0–4 vs Manchester City (A), 8 January 2023, FA Cup
| Home colours | Away colours | Third colours |

The 2022–23 season was Chelsea Football Club's 117th year in existence and 34th consecutive season in the top flight of English football. In addition to the domestic league, Chelsea participated in this season's editions of the FA Cup, EFL Cup and UEFA Champions League.

The season covers the period from 1 July 2022 to 30 June 2023. This was the first full season under new owner and chairman Todd Boehly after he officially acquired the club on 30 May 2022, making it the first season since 2002–03 without Roman Abramovich. It was also the first time in Chelsea's history that they were under four different managers in a single season. As Chelsea finished in 12th place, this was the first season since 1995–96 that the team failed to finish in the top half of the league table and the club's lowest league finish since ending the 1993–94 season in 14th place.

== Kits ==
| Home | Home alt. | Away | Away alt. | Third | Third alt. |
| Goalkeeper 1 | Goalkeeper 2 | Goalkeeper 3 |

== Season summary ==
On 23 May, it was announced that long-serving goalkeeping coach Christophe Lollichon would leave the club after having joined from Rennes in 2007 to help with the training of former goalkeeper Petr Čech.

On 28 May, Chelsea released a statement via the club website stating that "Chelsea Football Club can confirm that a final and definitive agreement was entered into last night to sell the Club to the Todd Boehly/Clearlake Capital consortium. It was expected that the transaction would be completed on Monday." The consortium led by Todd Boehly, chairman and CEO of Eldridge Industries, and Clearlake Capital, announced completion of the ownership transfer of Chelsea on 30 May 2022. The consortium also includes Hansjörg Wyss, founder of the Wyss Foundation, and Mark Walter, co-founder and CEO of Guggenheim Partners. Walter and Boehly are partial owners of the Los Angeles Dodgers, the Los Angeles Lakers, and the Los Angeles Sparks. The transaction has received all necessary approvals from The Government of the United Kingdom, The Premier League, and other authorities.

It was announced on 20 June that long-serving Chairman Bruce Buck would step-down after 19 years in the role effective on 30 June. A further statement was released on 22 June announcing a new-look Board of Directors including Boehly, Eghbali, Feliciano, Walter, Wyss as well as Jonathan Goldstein, Barbara Charone, Daniel Finkelstein and James Pade. It was also revealed that long serving Marina Granovskaia left the club, with Boehly acting as interim Sporting Director as well as chairman. The club then announced on 27 June that Petr Čech would leave his role as technical and performance advisor at the end of the month.

On 13 July, Chelsea announced their first signing of the season, with English international winger Raheem Sterling joining the club for a reported fee of £47.5 million. Three days later, they completed the signing of Kalidou Koulibaly for a reported fee of £33 million.

In the first match of the new Premier League season, Chelsea defeated Everton 1–0 at Goodison Park, with Jorginho scoring a penalty. The second game of the season saw Chelsea face their North London rivals Tottenham Hotspur at Stamford Bridge. After a relatively quiet first half, Chelsea went into the break 1–0 up courtesy of defender Kalidou Koulibaly's first goal for the club – a volley from a Marc Cucurella corner. Tottenham Hotspur midfielder Pierre-Emile Højbjerg equalised in the 68th minute, with Chelsea players and manager, Thomas Tuchel, unhappy that Kai Havertz had been fouled in the build-up to the goal, as well as Tottenham Hotspur forward Richarlison being in an offside position and obstructing Chelsea goalkeeper Édouard Mendy's view of Højbjerg's shot. In the aftermath of the goal, Tuchel squared up to Tottenham Hotspur manager, and former Chelsea boss, Antonio Conte, after Conte's exuberant celebrations. Both managers were shown yellow cards. Chelsea regained the lead through right-back Reece James' composed finish in the 77th minute. Tottenham Hotspur equalised again in the 96th minute, after Harry Kane had headed in from a corner. Once again, Tuchel and the Chelsea players were unhappy that Tottenham Hotspur defender Cristian Romero had pulled on Marc Cucurella's hair at the previous corner – an incident which had been reviewed by VAR referee Mike Dean. Both the referee and VAR admitted a mistake was made, during the hair pulling incident. Following the full-time whistle, there was another heated confrontation between Tuchel and Conte, with referee Anthony Taylor showing both straight red cards. In his post-match press conference, Tuchel stated that he was frustrated with the refereeing decisions against his team, and when asked about the supporters' view that Taylor has a history of making decisions against Chelsea, he replied: "I don't think just some of the fans think that. I can assure you the whole dressing room of us, every single person, thinks that". He went on to say that "of course" his players were worried when they had learned of Taylor's appointment to this game, and replied "maybe it would be better" when asked if Taylor should not referee Chelsea games in future. In the third league match, Chelsea travelled to Elland Road to face rivals Leeds United and suffered a heavy 3–0 defeat, the first of the season, leaving them five points behind league leaders Arsenal.

During the first week of September long time serving head of international scouting Scott McLachlan left the club. He had been on gardening leave for three months after being in his post for the last eleven years – during which he oversaw both the men's and youth recruitment during a significant portion of the Roman Abramovich era.

On 6 September, Chelsea started their UEFA Champions League campaign away to Dinamo Zagreb, losing 1–0. Shortly after the loss, Tuchel was sacked by the club.

On 8 September, Chelsea announced Graham Potter as their new head coach. Potter's debut match for Chelsea saw the Blues’ draw against Red Bull Salzburg 1–1 in a home Champions League match, with a Raheem Sterling goal. In Potter's second match, Chelsea defeated Crystal Palace 2–1 away from home. In his third match in charge, Chelsea trounced Milan 3–0 at Stamford Bridge, improving their position in the Champions League. They also won the reverse fixture away from home 2–0 top go top of their group. In between the two UCL games, Chelsea easily dispatched of Wolverhampton, 3–0. Chelsea's good form continued, as they defeated Aston Villa 2–0 on the road, with a Mason Mount brace. Overall, Potter won five and drew one of his first six matches in charge.

However, in the next 20 league matches, Chelsea only managed 4 wins and eight draws, while sustaining eight losses. As a result, team dropped to 11th and Graham Potter was sacked on 2 April 2023 following a 0–2 home defeat to Aston Villa. Chelsea were also out of both the Carabao Cup and FA Cup after losing to Manchester City in the third round of both competitions although they unexpectedly knocked out Borussia Dortmund in the Champions League round of 16 (0–1 away, 2–0 home). He was replaced by caretaker Bruno Saltor until 6 April, when an interim, Frank Lampard, was hired until the end of the season. Lampard had already led Chelsea in the 2019–20 and the first half of 2020–21 seasons.

Chelsea ended the season in 12th place after only managing 1 win and 2 draws, while sustaining 6 losses, in their nine league games under Lampard, capping off a turbulent first season under new ownership. As they had also been knocked out of the Champions League after losing 4–0 on aggregate to Real Madrid in the quarter-finals, they did not participate in European football the following season for the first time since 2016–17, the most recent time they won the Premier League.

== Management team ==
| Position | Name |
|---|---|
| Coach | (England) Frank Lampard |
| Assistant coach | (Sweden) Björn Hamberg |
| Assistant coach | (England) Anthony Barry |
| Goalkeeper coach | (Portugal) Henrique Hilário |
| Goalkeeper coach | (England) Ben Roberts |
| Assistant goalkeeper coach | (England) James Russell |
| Recruitment analyst | (Scotland) Kyle Macaulay |

== Players ==
=== Squad information ===
Players and squad numbers last updated on 28 May 2023. Appearances include all competitions.
Note: Flags indicate national team as has been defined under FIFA eligibility rules. Players may hold more than one non-FIFA nationality.

| No. | Player | Nat. | Position(s) | Date of birth (age) | Signed in | Contract ends | Signed from | Transfer fee | Apps. | Goals |
Goalkeepers
| 1 | Kepa Arrizabalaga | (Spain) | GK | 3 October 1994 (aged 28) | 2018 | 2025 | (Spain) Athletic Bilbao | £71.5M | 163 | 0 |
| 13 | Marcus Bettinelli (HG) | (England) | GK | 24 May 1992 (aged 31) | 2021 | 2026 | (England) Fulham | Free | 1 | 0 |
| 16 | Édouard Mendy | (Senegal) | GK | 1 March 1992 (aged 31) | 2020 | 2025 | (France) Rennes | £22M | 105 | 0 |
| 36 | Gabriel Slonina (U21) | (United States) | GK | 15 May 2004 (aged 19) | 2022 | 2028 | (United States) Chicago Fire | £8.1M | 0 | 0 |
Defenders
| 4 | Benoît Badiashile (U21) | (France) | CB | 26 March 2001 (aged 22) | 2023 | 2030 | (France) Monaco | £35M | 11 | 1 |
| 6 | Thiago Silva | (Brazil) | CB | 22 September 1984 (aged 38) | 2020 | 2024 | (France) Paris Saint-Germain | Free | 117 | 5 |
| 14 | Trevoh Chalobah (HG) | (England) | CB / RB / DM | 5 July 1999 (aged 23) | 2018 | 2028 | (England) Chelsea Academy | N/A | 63 | 4 |
| 21 | Ben Chilwell (HG) | (England) | LB / LWB | 21 December 1996 (aged 26) | 2020 | 2025 | (England) Leicester City | £45M | 85 | 9 |
| 24 | Reece James (HG) | (England) | RB / RWB / CB | 8 December 1999 (aged 23) | 2018 | 2028 | (England) Chelsea Academy | N/A | 147 | 11 |
| 26 | Kalidou Koulibaly | (Senegal) | CB / LB | 20 June 1991 (aged 32) | 2022 | 2026 | (Italy) Napoli | £33M | 32 | 2 |
| 28 | César Azpilicueta (captain) | (Spain) | RB / RWB / CB | 28 August 1989 (aged 33) | 2012 | 2024 | (France) Marseille | £7M | 508 | 17 |
| 32 | Marc Cucurella | (Spain) | LB / LWB / CB | 22 July 1998 (aged 24) | 2022 | 2028 | (England) Brighton & Hove Albion | £63M | 33 | 0 |
| 33 | Wesley Fofana | (France) | CB | 17 December 2000 (aged 22) | 2022 | 2029 | (England) Leicester City | £69.5M | 20 | 2 |
Midfielders
| 5 | Enzo Fernández (U21) | (Argentina) | CM / DM | 17 January 2001 (aged 22) | 2023 | 2031 | (Portugal) Benfica | £106.7M | 22 | 0 |
| 7 | N'Golo Kanté | (France) | DM / CM | 29 March 1991 (aged 32) | 2016 | 2023 | (England) Leicester City | £32M | 269 | 13 |
| 8 | Mateo Kovačić | (Croatia) | CM / DM | 6 May 1994 (aged 29) | 2019 | 2024 | (Spain) Real Madrid | £40M | 221 | 6 |
| 12 | Ruben Loftus-Cheek (HG) | (England) | CM / DM / RWB | 23 January 1996 (aged 27) | 2014 | 2024 | (England) Chelsea Academy | N/A | 155 | 13 |
| 19 | Mason Mount (HG) | (England) | AM / CM / LW | 10 January 1999 (aged 24) | 2017 | 2024 | (England) Chelsea Academy | N/A | 195 | 33 |
| 20 | Denis Zakaria | (Switzerland) | DM / CM | 20 November 1996 (aged 26) | 2022 | 2023 | (Italy) Juventus | Loan | 11 | 1 |
| 23 | Conor Gallagher (HG) | (England) | CM / AM / RM | 6 February 2000 (aged 23) | 2019 | 2025 | (England) Chelsea Academy | N/A | 45 | 3 |
| 30 | Carney Chukwuemeka (U21) | (Austria) | CM / AM / LM | 20 October 2003 (aged 19) | 2022 | 2028 | (England) Aston Villa | £20M | 15 | 0 |
| 56 | Omari Hutchinson (U21) | (Jamaica) | AM / LW / RW | 29 October 2003 (aged 19) | 2023 | 2025 | (England) Chelsea Academy | N/A | 2 | 0 |
| 67 | Lewis Hall (U21, ListB) | (England) | LM / LB / CB | 8 September 2004 (aged 18) | 2021 | 2025 | (England) Chelsea Academy | N/A | 12 | 0 |
Forwards
| 9 | Pierre-Emerick Aubameyang | (Gabon) | ST / LW / RW | 18 June 1989 (aged 34) | 2022 | 2024 | (Spain) Barcelona | £10.3M | 21 | 3 |
| 10 | Christian Pulisic | (United States) | LW / RW / RWB | 18 September 1998 (aged 24) | 2019 | 2024 | (Germany) Borussia Dortmund | £58M | 145 | 26 |
| 11 | João Félix | (Portugal) | ST / LW / RW | 10 November 1999 (aged 23) | 2023 | 2023 | (Spain) Atlético Madrid | Loan | 20 | 4 |
| 15 | Mykhailo Mudryk (U21) | (Ukraine) | LW / AM / RW | 5 January 2001 (aged 22) | 2023 | 2031 | (Ukraine) Shakhtar Donetsk | £88.5M | 17 | 0 |
| 17 | Raheem Sterling (HG) | (England) | LW / RW / LWB | 8 December 1994 (aged 28) | 2022 | 2027 | (England) Manchester City | £47.5M | 38 | 9 |
| 18 | Armando Broja (U21, ListB) | (Albania) | ST | 10 September 2001 (aged 21) | 2020 | 2028 | (England) Chelsea Academy | N/A | 19 | 1 |
| 22 | Hakim Ziyech | (Morocco) | RW / AM / RWB | 19 March 1993 (aged 30) | 2020 | 2025 | (Netherlands) Ajax | £37M | 107 | 14 |
| 27 | David Datro Fofana (U21) | (Ivory Coast) | ST / RW / LW | 22 December 2002 (aged 20) | 2023 | 2029 | (Norway) Molde | £8M | 4 | 0 |
| 29 | Kai Havertz | (Germany) | ST / AM / RW | 11 June 1999 (aged 24) | 2020 | 2025 | (Germany) Bayer Leverkusen | £72M | 139 | 32 |
| 31 | Noni Madueke (U21) | (England) | RW / ST / AM | 10 March 2002 (aged 21) | 2023 | 2030 | (Netherlands) PSV | £30.6M | 12 | 1 |

Notes:

- Player (HG) – Player who fulfils the Premier League's "Home Grown Player" criteria.
- Player (U21) – Player who was registered by Chelsea as an Under-21 Player on the 2022–23 Premier League Squad List.
- Player (ListB) – Player who was registered by Chelsea on the 2022–23 UEFA Champions League Squad List B.

== Transfers ==
=== In ===
==== Summer ====
| Date | No. | Pos. | Player | From | Fee | Source |
|---|---|---|---|---|---|---|
| 1 July 2022 | 50 | GK | (Wales) Eddie Beach | (England) Southampton | Undisclosed | |
| 13 July 2022 | 17 | FW | (England) Raheem Sterling | (England) Manchester City | £47,500,000 | |
| 16 July 2022 | 26 | DF | (Senegal) Kalidou Koulibaly | (Italy) Napoli | £33,000,000 | |
| 16 July 2022 | 56 | MF | (Jamaica) Omari Hutchinson | (England) Arsenal | Free | |
| 2 August 2022 | 36 | GK | (United States) Gabriel Slonina | (United States) Chicago Fire | £8,100,000 | |
| 4 August 2022 | 30 | MF | (England) Carney Chukwuemeka | (England) Aston Villa | £20,000,000 | |
| 4 August 2022 | 45 | DF | (England) Zak Sturge | (England) Brighton & Hove Albion | Free | |
| 5 August 2022 | 32 | DF | (Spain) Marc Cucurella | (England) Brighton & Hove Albion | £60,000,000 | |
| 11 August 2022 | 77 | MF | (England) Tyler Dibling | (England) Southampton | £1,700,000 | |
| 19 August 2022 | 46 | MF | (Italy) Cesare Casadei | (Italy) Inter Milan | £16,800,000 | |
| 31 August 2022 | 33 | DF | (France) Wesley Fofana | (England) Leicester City | £75,000,000 | |
| 1 September 2022 | 9 | FW | (Gabon) Pierre-Emerick Aubameyang | (Spain) Barcelona | £10,300,000 | |

==== Winter ====
| Date | No. | Pos. | Player | From | Fee | Source |
|---|---|---|---|---|---|---|
| 5 January 2023 | 4 | DF | (France) Benoît Badiashile | (France) Monaco | £35,000,000 | |
| 7 January 2023 | 27 | FW | (Ivory Coast) David Datro Fofana | (Norway) Molde | £10,000,000 | |
| 7 January 2023 | | MF | (Brazil) Andrey Santos | (Brazil) Vasco da Gama | £18,000,000 | |
| 15 January 2023 | 15 | MF | (Ukraine) Mykhailo Mudryk | (Ukraine) Shakhtar Donetsk | £62,000,000 (Note: Initial £62 million plus reported £27 million bonuses) | |
| 20 January 2023 | 31 | FW | (England) Noni Madueke | (Netherlands) PSV Eindhoven | £29,000,000 | |
| 29 January 2023 | — | DF | (France) Malo Gusto | (France) Lyon | £26,300,000 | |
| 31 January 2023 | 8 | MF | (Argentina) Enzo Fernández | (Portugal) Benfica | £106,800,000 | |
| 10 February 2023 | | FW | (England) Jimmy-Jay Morgan | (England) Southampton | £3,000,000 | |

=== Loan in ===
==== Summer ====
| Date | No. | Pos. | Player | From | Fee | Source |
|---|---|---|---|---|---|---|
| 1 September 2022 | 20 | MF | (Switzerland) Denis Zakaria | (Italy) Juventus | £2,700,000 | |

==== Winter ====
| Date | No. | Pos. | Player | From | Fee | Source |
|---|---|---|---|---|---|---|
| 11 January 2023 | 11 | FW | (Portugal) João Félix | (Spain) Atlético Madrid | £9,700,000 | |

=== Out ===
==== Summer ====
| Date | No. | Pos. | Player | To | Fee | Source |
|---|---|---|---|---|---|---|
| 1 July 2022 | 2 | DF | (Germany) Antonio Rüdiger | (Spain) Real Madrid | Free | |
| 1 July 2022 | 4 | DF | (Denmark) Andreas Christensen | (Spain) Barcelona | Free | |
| 1 July 2022 | 41 | MF | (England) George McEachran | (England) Swindon Town (Note: Released on 1 July 2022, McEachran joined Swindon Town on 13 February 2023.) | Released | |
| 1 July 2022 | 42 | MF | (Austria) Thierno Ballo | (Austria) Wolfsberger AC (Note: Released on 1 July 2022, Ballo joined Wolfsberger AC on 12 July 2022) | Released | |
| 1 July 2022 | | GK | (Croatia) Karlo Žiger | (Croatia) Gorica | Free | |
| 1 July 2022 | | DF | (England) Jake Clarke-Salter | (England) Queens Park Rangers | Free | |
| 1 July 2022 | | MF | (England) Danny Drinkwater | Retired (Note: On 30 October 2023, Drinkwater announced his retirement from football.) | N/A | |
| 1 July 2022 | | MF | (Belgium) Charly Musonda | (Spain) Levante (Note: Released on 1 July 2022, Musonda joined Levante on 16 August 2022) | Released | |
| 12 July 2022 | | FW | (Republic of Ireland) George Nunn | (England) Derby County | Free | |
| 20 July 2022 | | DF | (England) Josh Tobin | (England) Cray Wanderers (Note: Released on 20 July 2022, Tobin joined Cray Wanderers on 8 November 2023) | Free | |
| 5 August 2022 | | DF | (United States) Matt Miazga | (United States) FC Cincinnati | Free | |
| 8 August 2022 | 11 | FW | (Germany) Timo Werner | (Germany) RB Leipzig | £25,300,000 | |
| 15 August 2022 | | MF | (Sweden) Edwin Andersson | (England) Stoke City | Free | |
| 23 August 2022 | 33 | DF | (Italy) Emerson | (England) West Ham United | £15,000,000 | |
| 26 August 2022 | | DF | (Jamaica) Luke Badley-Morgan | (England) Stoke City | Free | |
| 29 August 2022 | | MF | (England) Ross Barkley | (France) Nice (Note: Released on 29 August 2022, Barkley joined Nice on 4 September 2022) | Released | |
| 1 September 2022 | 3 | DF | (Spain) Marcos Alonso | (Spain) Barcelona | Free | |
| 1 September 2022 | 35 | MF | (Scotland) Billy Gilmour | (England) Brighton & Hove Albion | £10,000,000 | |
| 1 September 2022 | 77 | MF | (England) Tyler Dibling | (England) Southampton | Undisclosed | |
| 1 September 2022 | | DF | (Netherlands) Xavier Mbuyamba | (Netherlands) Volendam | Undisclosed | |
| 1 September 2022 | | FW | (Brazil) Kenedy | (Spain) Valladolid | £500,000 | |
| 2 September 2022 | | FW | (Belgium) Michy Batshuayi | (Turkey) Fenerbahçe | £3,500,000 | |
| 11 November 2022 | | DF | (England) Alex Kpakpé | (Scotland) Rangers (Note: Released on 11 November 2022, Kpakpé joined Rangers on 10 January 2023.) | Released | |

==== Winter ====
| Date | No. | Pos. | Player | To | Fee | Source |
|---|---|---|---|---|---|---|
| 31 January 2023 | 61 | FW | (England) Jude Soonsup-Bell | (England) Tottenham Hotspur | Free | |
| 31 January 2023 | 5 | MF | (Italy) Jorginho | (England) Arsenal | £12,000,000 | |

=== Loans out ===
==== Summer ====
| Date | Until | No. | Pos. | Player | To | Fee | Source |
|---|---|---|---|---|---|---|---|
| 30 August 2021 | 30 June 2023 | | MF | (France) Tiémoué Bakayoko | (Italy) Milan | £1,800,000 | |
| 1 July 2022 | End of season | 9 | FW | (Belgium) Romelu Lukaku | (Italy) Inter Milan | £7,000,000 | |
| 1 July 2022 | 15 January 2023 (Note: On 15 January, Bergström was recalled from his season-long loan at Peterborough United.) | 36 | GK | (Finland) Lucas Bergström | (England) Peterborough United | Free | |
| 1 July 2022 | End of season | 45 | DF | (Northern Ireland) Sam McClelland | (England) Barrow | Free | |
| 1 July 2022 | 31 January 2023 (Note: On 31 January, Wady was recalled from his season-long loan at Woking.) | | GK | (United States) Ethan Wady | (England) Woking | Free | |
| 4 July 2022 | End of season | | GK | (England) Nathan Baxter | (England) Hull City | Free | |
| 7 July 2022 | 2 September 2022 (Note: On 2 September, Adegoke was recalled from his season-long loan at Welling United.) | 70 | GK | (England) Prince Adegoke | (England) Welling United | Free | |
| 9 July 2022 | End of season | | GK | (England) Jamie Cumming | (England) Milton Keynes Dons | Free | |
| 15 July 2022 | End of season | | DF | (Netherlands) Ian Maatsen | (England) Burnley | Free | |
| 22 July 2022 | End of season | | MF | (England) Tino Anjorin | (England) Huddersfield Town | Free | |
| 22 July 2022 | End of season | | DF | (England) Henry Lawrence | (England) Milton Keynes Dons | Free | |
| 2 August 2022 | 31 December 2022 | 36 | GK | (United States) Gabriel Slonina | (United States) Chicago Fire | Free | |
| 5 August 2022 | End of season | | DF | (England) Levi Colwill | (England) Brighton & Hove Albion | Free | |
| 10 August 2022 | End of season | 31 | DF | (France) Malang Sarr | (France) Monaco | £900,000 | |
| 30 August 2022 | End of season | 20 | FW | (England) Callum Hudson-Odoi | (Germany) Bayer Leverkusen | Free | |
| 31 August 2022 | End of season | | DF | (Ghana) Baba Rahman | (England) Reading | Free | |
| 1 September 2022 | 23 January 2023 (Note: On 23 January, Vale was recalled from his season-long loan at Hull City.) | 39 | MF | (England) Harvey Vale | (England) Hull City | Free | |
| 1 September 2022 | End of season | 44 | DF | (Wales) Ethan Ampadu | (Italy) Spezia | Free | |
| 1 September 2022 | 1 January 2023 | 51 | MF | (England) Joe Haigh | (England) Derby County | Free | |
| 1 September 2022 | 11 January 2023 (Note: On 11 January, Wareham was recalled from his season-long loan at Leyton Orient.) | 53 | FW | (England) Jayden Wareham | (England) Leyton Orient | Free | |
| 1 September 2022 | End of season | 54 | MF | (England) Xavier Simons | (England) Hull City | Free | |
| 1 September 2022 | End of season | | DF | (England) Dujon Sterling | (England) Stoke City | Free | |
| 1 September 2022 | 31 January 2023 (Note: On 31 January, Fiabema was recalled from his season-long loan at Forest Green Rovers.) | | FW | (Norway) Bryan Fiabema | (England) Forest Green Rovers | Free | |

==== Winter ====
| Date | Until | No. | Pos. | Player | To | Fee | Source |
|---|---|---|---|---|---|---|---|
| 13 January 2023 | End of season | 50 | GK | (Wales) Eddie Beach | (England) Chelmsford City | Free | |
| 13 January 2023 | End of season | 40 | GK | (England) Teddy Sharman-Lowe | (England) Havant & Waterlooville | Free | |
| 27 January 2023 | End of season | 42 | DF | (England) Bashir Humphreys | (Germany) SC Paderborn | Free | |
| 29 January 2023 | End of season | | DF | (France) Malo Gusto | (France) Lyon | Free | |
| 30 January 2023 | End of season | 46 | MF | (Italy) Cesare Casadei | (England) Reading | Free | |
| 31 January 2023 | End of season | 80 | GK | (England) Max Merrick | (England) Hanwell Town | Free | |
| 2 March 2023 | End of season | | MF | (Brazil) Andrey Santos | (Brazil) Vasco da Gama | Free | |

=== Overall transfer activity ===
==== Expenditure ====
Summer: ▼£275,100,000

Winter: ▼£299,700,000

Total: ▼£574,800,000

==== Income ====
Summer: ▲£64,000,000

Winter: ▲£12,000,000

Total: ▲£76,000,000

==== Net totals ====
Summer: ▼£211,100,000

Winter: ▼£287,700,000

Total: ▼£498,800,000

== Pre-season and friendlies ==
Chelsea announced they would travel to the United States to take part in the FC Series with a friendly against Arsenal. A month later the club announced two further fixtures as part of the FC Series, against América and Charlotte FC. On 6 July, Chelsea confirmed they would play Udinese in Italy after the American tour.

During the mid-season winter break, The club announced a friendly with Aston Villa in Abu Dhabi.

Win Draw Loss Fixtures

| 16 July 2022 FC Series | América | 1–2 | Chelsea | Paradise, United States |
| 19:00 PT (UTC-8) | Damm (yellow card) 3'; Aquino (yellow card) 27'; James 60' (o.g.) | Report | Gallagher (yellow card) 35'; Werner 55' (yellow card) 90+2'; Mount 83' | Stadium: Allegiant Stadium; Attendance: 47,223; Referee: Kevin Broadley (United States) |

| 20 July 2022 FC Series | Charlotte FC | 1–1 (5–3 p) | Chelsea | Charlotte, United States |
| 20:35 EDT (UTC-4) (Note: The match was originally scheduled for 19:30 EDT, but was rescheduled to 20:35 EDT due to severe weather conditions around the stadium.) | Mora (yellow card) 47'; McNeill (yellow card) 53'; Ríos 90+2' (pen.) | Report | Pulisic (yellow card) 17', (goal) 30'; Chalobah (yellow card) 90+1' | Stadium: Bank of America Stadium; Attendance: 52,673; Referee: Rosendo Mendoza (United States) |
| | Penalties |
| | Ríos (penalty scored); Makoun (penalty scored); Walkes (penalty scored); Mora (penalty scored); Jóźwiak (penalty scored) | | (penalty scored) Havertz; (penalty scored) Chilwell; (penalty missed) Gallagher; (penalty scored) Sterling |
Note:

| 23 July 2022 FC Series | Arsenal | 4–0 | Chelsea | Orlando, United States |
| 20:00 EDT (UTC-4) | Gabriel Jesus 15'; Ødegaard 36', (yellow card) 78'; Nketiah (yellow card) 60'; Saka 66'; Sambi Lokonga 90+2', (yellow card) 90+3' | Report | Mount (yellow card) 49'; Alonso (yellow card) 76'; Ampadu (yellow card) 77'; Koulibaly (yellow card) 90' | Stadium: Camping World Stadium; Attendance: 63,811; Referee: Kevin Broadley (United States) |

| 29 July 2022 Friendly | Udinese | 1–3 | Chelsea | Udine, Italy |
| 21:00 CEST (UTC+2) | Deulofeu 42' | Report | Kanté 20'; Sterling 37'; Mount 90' | Stadium: Stadio Friuli; Attendance: 11,776; Referee: Michael Fabbri (Italy) |

| 11 December 2022 Al Wadha FC Challenge Cup | Aston Villa | 1–0 | Chelsea | Abu Dhabi, United Arab Emirates |
| 18:10 GST (UTC+4) | McGinn 7' | Report | Brooking (yellow card) 66' | Stadium: Al Nahyan Stadium; Referee: Omar Mohamed Al Ali (United Arab Emirates) |

| 20 December 2022 Friendly | Chelsea | 5–1 | Brentford | Cobham, Surrey, England |
| | Kai Havertz x3 | Report | | Stadium: Cobham Training Centre; Attendance: 0 |

== Competitions ==
=== Overall record ===
| Competition | First match | Last match | Starting round | Final position | Record | | | | | | | |
| Competition | First match | Last match | Starting round | Final position | Pld | W | D | L | GF | GA | GD | Win % |
|---|---|---|---|---|---|---|---|---|---|---|---|---|
| Premier League | 6 August 2022 | 28 May 2023 | Matchday 1 | 12th | 38 | 11 | 11 | 16 | 38 | 47 | −9 | 28.95 |
| FA Cup | 8 January 2023 | | Third round | Third round | 1 | 0 | 0 | 1 | 0 | 4 | −4 | 0.00 |
| EFL Cup | 9 November 2022 | | Third round | Third round | 1 | 0 | 0 | 1 | 0 | 2 | −2 | 0.00 |
| UEFA Champions League | 6 September 2022 | 18 April 2023 | Group stage | Quarter-finals | 10 | 5 | 1 | 4 | 12 | 9 | +3 | 50.00 |
| Total | | | | | 50 | 16 | 12 | 22 | 50 | 62 | −12 | 32.00 |

Source: Soccerway

=== Premier League ===
==== League table ====
| Pos | Team | Pld | W | D | L | GF | GA | GD | Pts | Qualification or relegation |
|---|---|---|---|---|---|---|---|---|---|---|
| 10 | Fulham | 38 | 15 | 7 | 16 | 55 | 53 | +2 | 52 | |
| 11 | Crystal Palace | 38 | 11 | 12 | 15 | 40 | 49 | −9 | 45 | |
| 12 | Chelsea | 38 | 11 | 11 | 16 | 38 | 47 | −9 | 44 | |
| 13 | Wolverhampton Wanderers | 38 | 11 | 8 | 19 | 31 | 58 | −27 | 41 | |
| 14 | West Ham United | 38 | 11 | 7 | 20 | 42 | 55 | −13 | 40 | Qualification to Europa League group stage (Note: West Ham United qualified for the Europa League group stage by winning the 2022–23 UEFA Europa Conference League.) |

Source: Premier League
Rules for classification: 1) Points; 2) Goal difference; 3) Goals scored; 4) If the champions, relegated teams or qualified teams for UEFA competitions cannot be determined by rules 1 to 3, rules 4.1 to 4.3 are applied – 4.1) Points gained in head-to-head record between such teams; 4.2) Away goals scored in head-to-head record between such teams; 4.3) Play-offs

==== Results summary ====
| Overall | | | | | | | | Home | | | | | | Away | | | | | |
| Pld | W | D | L | GF | GA | GD | Pts | W | D | L | GF | GA | GD | W | D | L | GF | GA | GD |
|---|---|---|---|---|---|---|---|---|---|---|---|---|---|---|---|---|---|---|---|
| 38 | 11 | 11 | 16 | 38 | 47 | −9 | 44 | 6 | 7 | 6 | 20 | 19 | +1 | 5 | 4 | 10 | 18 | 28 | −10 |

Source: Premier League

==== Results by round ====
| Round | 1 | 2 | 3 | 4 | 5 | 6 | 9 | 10 | 11 | 12 | 13 | 14 | 15 | 16 | 17 | 18 | 19 | 7 | 20 | 21 | 22 | 23 | 24 | 25 | 26 | 27 | 28 | 29 | 8 | 30 | 31 | 32 | 33 | 34 | 35 | 36 | 37 | 38 |
|---|---|---|---|---|---|---|---|---|---|---|---|---|---|---|---|---|---|---|---|---|---|---|---|---|---|---|---|---|---|---|---|---|---|---|---|---|---|---|
| Ground | A | H | A | H | A | H | A | H | A | A | H | A | H | A | H | A | H | A | H | A | H | A | H | A | H | A | H | H | H | A | H | H | A | A | H | A | A | H |
| Result | W | D | L | W | L | W | W | W | W | D | D | L | L | L | W | D | L | L | W | D | D | D | L | L | W | W | D | L | D | L | L | L | L | W | D | L | L | D |
| Position | 8 | 7 | 12 | 6 | 10 | 6 | 5 | 4 | 4 | 4 | 5 | 6 | 7 | 8 | 8 | 8 | 10 | 10 | 10 | 10 | 9 | 10 | 10 | 10 | 10 | 10 | 10 | 11 | 11 | 11 | 11 | 11 | 12 | 11 | 11 | 12 | 12 | 12 |

Source: Premier League
A = Away; H = Home; W = Win; D = Draw; L = Loss; P = Postponed

==== Score overview ====
Win Draw Loss

| Opposition | Home score | Away score | Aggregate score | Double |
|---|---|---|---|---|
| Arsenal | 0–1 | 1–3 | 1–4 | No |
| Aston Villa | 0–2 | 2–0 | 2–2 | No |
| Bournemouth | 2–0 | 3–1 | 5–1 | Yes |
| Brentford | 0–2 | 0–0 | 0–2 | No |
| Brighton | 1–2 | 1–4 | 2–6 | No |
| Crystal Palace | 1–0 | 2–1 | 3–1 | Yes |
| Everton | 2–2 | 1–0 | 3–2 | No |
| Fulham | 0–0 | 1–2 | 1–2 | No |
| Leeds United | 1–0 | 0–3 | 1–3 | No |
| Leicester City | 2–1 | 3–1 | 5–2 | Yes |
| Liverpool | 0–0 | 0–0 | 0–0 | No |
| Manchester City | 0–1 | 0–1 | 0–2 | No |
| Manchester United | 1–1 | 1–4 | 2–5 | No |
| Newcastle United | 1–1 | 0–1 | 1–2 | No |
| Nottingham Forest | 2–2 | 1–1 | 3–3 | No |
| Southampton | 0–1 | 1–2 | 1–3 | No |
| Tottenham Hotspur | 2–2 | 0–2 | 2–4 | No |
| West Ham United | 2–1 | 1–1 | 3–2 | No |
| Wolves | 3–0 | 0–1 | 3–1 | No |

==== Matches ====
Win Draw Loss Fixtures

The league fixtures were announced on 16 June 2022.

| 6 August 2022 1 | Everton | 0–1 | Chelsea | Walton |
| 17:30 BST | Mina (yellow card) 45+8'; Mykolenko (yellow card) 80'; Holgate (yellow card) 90+8' | Report | Jorginho 45+9' (pen.); James (yellow card) 56'; Cucurella (yellow card) 90+11' | Stadium: Goodison Park; Attendance: 39,254; Referee: Craig Pawson |

| 14 August 2022 2 | Chelsea | 2–2 | Tottenham Hotspur | Fulham |
| 16:30 BST | Koulibaly 19'; James (yellow card) 41', (goal) 77'; Mendy (yellow card) 62'; Havertz (yellow card) 86' | Report | Højbjerg 68'; Kane 90+6' | Stadium: Stamford Bridge; Attendance: 39,946; Referee: Anthony Taylor |

| 21 August 2022 3 | Leeds United | 3–0 | Chelsea | Leeds |
| 14:00 BST | Aaronson 33'; Rodrigo 37'; Harrison 69' | Report | Koulibaly (yellow card) 9' (yellow-red card) 84'; Sterling (yellow card) 36' | Stadium: Elland Road; Attendance: 36,372; Referee: Stuart Attwell |

| 27 August 2022 4 | Chelsea | 2–1 | Leicester City | Fulham |
| 15:00 BST | Gallagher (yellow card) 22' (yellow-red card) 28'; Sterling 47', 63'; Havertz (yellow card) 90+3' | Report | Dewsbury-Hall (yellow card) 31'; Praet (yellow card) 40'; Barnes 66' | Stadium: Stamford Bridge; Attendance: 39,953; Referee: Paul Tierney |

| 30 August 2022 5 | Southampton | 2–1 | Chelsea | Southampton |
| 19:45 BST | Lavia 28'; A. Armstrong 45+1'; Salisu (yellow card) 53'; Ward-Prowse (yellow card) 64' | Report | Sterling 23'; Pulisic (yellow card) 80' | Stadium: St Mary's Stadium; Attendance: 31,072; Referee: Michael Oliver |

| 3 September 2022 6 | Chelsea | 2–1 | West Ham United | Fulham |
| 15:00 BST | Loftus-Cheek (yellow card) 9'; Cucurella (yellow card) 35'; James (yellow card) 54'; Chilwell 76'; Havertz 88', (yellow card) 90+8' | Report | Antonio (yellow card) 54', (goal) 62'; Kehrer (yellow card) 90+3' | Stadium: Stamford Bridge; Attendance: 39,923; Referee: Andrew Madley |

| 1 October 2022 9 | Crystal Palace | 1–2 | Chelsea | Selhurst |
| 15:00 BST | Édouard 7', (yellow card) 22' | Report | Thiago Silva (yellow card) 33'; Aubameyang 38'; Mount (yellow card) 52'; Kovačić (yellow card) 88'; Gallagher 90' | Stadium: Selhurst Park; Attendance: 25,198; Referee: Chris Kavanagh |

| 8 October 2022 10 | Chelsea | 3–0 | Wolverhampton Wanderers | Fulham |
| 15:00 BST | Azpilicueta (yellow card) 22'; Havertz 45+3'; Pulisic 54'; Jorginho (yellow card) 61'; Broja 90' | Report | | Stadium: Stamford Bridge; Attendance: 39,940; Referee: Simon Hooper |

| 16 October 2022 11 | Aston Villa | 0–2 | Chelsea | Birmingham |
| 14:00 BST | | Report | Mount 6', 65', (yellow card) 83'; Chilwell (yellow card) 33'; Koulibaly (yellow card) 61' | Stadium: Villa Park; Attendance: 41,754; Referee: Robert Jones |

| 19 October 2022 12 | Brentford | 0–0 | Chelsea | Brentford |
| 19:30 BST | | Report | | Stadium: Gtech Community Stadium; Attendance: 17,118; Referee: Jarred Gillett |

| 22 October 2022 13 | Chelsea | 1–1 | Manchester United | Fulham |
| 17:30 BST | Jorginho 87' (pen.), (yellow card) 90+2' | Report | Antony (yellow card) 32'; Fred (yellow card) 86'; Shaw (yellow card) 90'; Casemiro 90+4'; Martínez (yellow card) 90+5' | Stadium: Stamford Bridge; Attendance: 39,503; Referee: Stuart Attwell |

| 29 October 2022 14 | Brighton & Hove Albion | 4–1 | Chelsea | Falmer |
| 15:00 BST | Trossard 5'; Loftus-Cheek 14' (o.g.); Chalobah 42' (o.g.); Enciso (yellow card) 83'; Groß 90+2' | Report | Kovačić (yellow card) 11'; Havertz 48'; Sterling (yellow card) 50' | Stadium: Falmer Stadium; Attendance: 31,746; Referee: Andrew Madley |

| 6 November 2022 15 | Chelsea | 0–1 | Arsenal | Fulham |
| 12:00 GMT | Aubameyang (yellow card) 27'; Azpilicueta (yellow card) 51'; Chalobah (yellow card) 60'; Gallagher (yellow card) 85'; Sterling (yellow card) 89' | Report | Saka (yellow card) 42'; Gabriel 63'; White (yellow card) 80' | Stadium: Stamford Bridge; Attendance: 40,142; Referee: Michael Oliver |

| 12 November 2022 16 | Newcastle United | 1–0 | Chelsea | Newcastle upon Tyne |
| 17:30 GMT | Trippier (yellow card) 56'; Willock 67'; Pope (yellow card) 90+5'; Longstaff (yellow card) 90+8'; Lascelles (yellow card) 90+9' | Report | Jorginho (yellow card) 30'; Koulibaly (yellow card) 89' | Stadium: St James' Park; Attendance: 52,264; Referee: Robert Jones |

| 27 December 2022 17 | Chelsea | 2–0 | Bournemouth | Fulham |
| 17:30 GMT | Havertz 16'; Mount 24' | Report | | Stadium: Stamford Bridge; Attendance: 40,046; Referee: Simon Hooper |

| 1 January 2023 18 | Nottingham Forest | 1–1 | Chelsea | West Bridgford |
| 16:30 GMT | Yates (yellow card) 43'; Aurier 63'; Lodi (yellow card) 90+3' | Report | Sterling 16'; Azpilicueta (yellow card) 53'; Gallagher (yellow card) 90' | Stadium: City Ground; Attendance: 29,229; Referee: Peter Bankes |

| 5 January 2023 19 | Chelsea | 0–1 | Manchester City | Fulham |
| 20:00 GMT | Kovačić (yellow card) 89'; Koulibaly (yellow card) 90+4' | Report | Mahrez 63' | Stadium: Stamford Bridge; Attendance: 39,998; Referee: Paul Tierney |

| 12 January 2023 7 | Fulham | 2–1 | Chelsea | Fulham |
| 20:00 GMT | Robinson (yellow card) 9'; Pereira (yellow card) 14'; Willian 25'; Carlos Vinícius 73'; Adarabioyo (yellow card) 84' | Report | Chalobah (yellow card) 36'; Koulibaly 47'; Félix (red card) 58'; Hall (yellow card) 62'; Mount (yellow card) 76' | Stadium: Craven Cottage; Attendance: 24,460; Referee: David Coote |
Note: This match, originally to be played on 10 September 2022, was included in the league-wide postponement due to the death of Queen Elizabeth II.

| 15 January 2023 20 | Chelsea | 1–0 | Crystal Palace | Fulham |
| 14:00 GMT | Jorginho (yellow card) 49'; Havertz 64'; Gallagher (yellow card) 84' | Report | Doucouré (yellow card) 26'; Clyne (yellow card) 42'; Eze (yellow card) 52'; Hughes (yellow card) 83'; Guéhi (yellow card) 88' | Stadium: Stamford Bridge; Attendance: 40,075; Referee: Peter Bankes |

| 21 January 2023 21 | Liverpool | 0–0 | Chelsea | Liverpool |
| 12:30 GMT | Bajcetic (yellow card) 34'; Milner (yellow card) 66'; Jones (yellow card) 90' | Report | Chalobah (yellow card) 80' | Stadium: Anfield; Attendance: 53,126; Referee: Michael Oliver |

| 3 February 2023 22 | Chelsea | 0–0 | Fulham | Fulham |
| 20:00 GMT | Gallagher (yellow card) 64' | Report | Palhinha (yellow card) 22'; Pereira (yellow card) 51'; Decordova-Reid (yellow card) 67'; Wilson (yellow card) 90+3' | Stadium: Stamford Bridge; Attendance: 40,041; Referee: Stuart Attwell |

| 11 February 2023 23 | West Ham United | 1–1 | Chelsea | London |
| 12:30 GMT | Emerson 28'; Coufal (yellow card) 55' | Report | Félix 16'; Badiashile (yellow card) 64' | Stadium: London Stadium; Attendance: 62,471; Referee: Craig Pawson |

| 18 February 2023 24 | Chelsea | 0–1 | Southampton | Fulham |
| 15:00 GMT | Koulibaly (yellow card) 4'; Arrizabalaga (yellow card) 87'; Kovačić (yellow card) 90+7' | Report | Bella-Kotchap (yellow card) 16'; Ward-Prowse 45+1', (yellow card) 90+7'; S. Armstrong (yellow card) 45+4'; Mara (yellow card) 75'; Lavia (yellow card) 87'; Perraud (yellow card) 90+8' | Stadium: Stamford Bridge; Attendance: 40,152; Referee: David Coote |

| 26 February 2023 25 | Tottenham Hotspur | 2–0 | Chelsea | London |
| 13:30 GMT | Emerson (yellow card) 45+3'; Skipp 46'; Davies (yellow card) 59'; Kane 82' | Report | Havertz (yellow card) 45+3'; Ziyech (yellow card) 45+6'; Mount (yellow card) 74' | Stadium: Tottenham Hotspur Stadium; Attendance: 61,613; Referee: Stuart Attwell |

| 4 March 2023 26 | Chelsea | 1–0 | Leeds United | Fulham |
| 15:00 GMT | W. Fofana (yellow card) 33', (goal) 53'; Gallagher (yellow card) 90+4' | Report | | Stadium: Stamford Bridge; Attendance: 39,905; Referee: Michael Oliver |

| 11 March 2023 27 | Leicester City | 1–3 | Chelsea | Leicester |
| 15:00 GMT | Faes (yellow card) 19' (yellow-red card) 87'; Daka 39'; Pereira (yellow card) 51' | Report | Chilwell 11'; W. Fofana (yellow card) 13'; Cucurella (yellow card) 31'; Havertz 45+6'; Kovačić 78' | Stadium: King Power Stadium; Attendance: 32,170; Referee: Andre Marriner |

| 18 March 2023 28 | Chelsea | 2–2 | Everton | Fulham |
| 17:30 GMT | Félix 52'; Koulibaly (yellow card) 57'; James (yellow card) 74'; Havertz 76' (pen.) | Report | Gueye (yellow card) 29'; McNeil (yellow card) 45+1'; Doucouré 69'; Simms 89' | Stadium: Stamford Bridge; Attendance: 40,025; Referee: Darren England |

| 1 April 2023 29 | Chelsea | 0–2 | Aston Villa | Fulham |
| 17:30 BST | Kovačić (yellow card) 39'; Chilwell (yellow card) 54'; Fernández (yellow card) 68' | Report | Kamara (yellow card) 4'; Watkins 18'; McGinn 56'; Chambers (yellow card) 84'; Digne (yellow card) 90+3' | Stadium: Stamford Bridge; Attendance: 40,082; Referee: Andrew Madley |

| 4 April 2023 8 | Chelsea | 0–0 | Liverpool | Fulham |
| 20:00 BST | Kovačić (yellow card) 68' | Report | Matip (yellow card) 46'; Tsimikas (yellow card) 56'; Jones (yellow card) 61'; Fabinho (yellow card) 74' | Stadium: Stamford Bridge; Attendance: 40,093; Referee: Anthony Taylor |
Note: The match, originally to be played on 18 September 2022, was postponed due to police concerns surrounding the state funeral of Queen Elizabeth II.

| 8 April 2023 30 | Wolverhampton Wanderers | 1–0 | Chelsea | Wolverhampton |
| 15:00 BST | Nunes 31'; Lemina (yellow card) 39'; João Gomes (yellow card) 59' | Report | Cucurella (yellow card) 49'; Sterling (yellow card) 63'; Gallagher (yellow card) 67'; Kovačić (yellow card) 87'; Chilwell (yellow card) 89' | Stadium: Molineux Stadium; Attendance: 31,614; Referee: Peter Bankes |

| 15 April 2023 31 | Chelsea | 1–2 | Brighton & Hove Albion | Fulham |
| 15:00 BST | Gallagher 13', (yellow card) 45'; Chalobah (yellow card) 51' | Report | Veltman (yellow card) 4'; Welbeck 42'; Enciso 69'; Sánchez (yellow card) 77' | Stadium: Stamford Bridge; Attendance: 40,126; Referee: Robert Jones |

| 26 April 2023 33 | Chelsea | 0–2 | Brentford | Fulham |
| 19:45 BST | W. Fofana (yellow card) 72' | Report | Azpilicueta 37' (o.g.); Jensen (yellow card) 46'; Henry (yellow card) 73'; Mbeumo 78' | Stadium: Stamford Bridge; Attendance: 39,929; Referee: Andrew Madley |

| 2 May 2023 34 | Arsenal | 3–1 | Chelsea | London |
| 20:00 BST | Ødegaard 18', 31'; Gabriel Jesus 34' | Report | Madueke 65'; Kovačić (yellow card) 80'; Gallagher (yellow card) 90+5' | Stadium: Emirates Stadium; Attendance: 60,144; Referee: Robert Jones |
Note: The match, originally scheduled for 29 April 2023, was postponed due to consequences of the increased policing demands necessary for the coronation of King Charles III.

| 6 May 2023 35 | Bournemouth | 1–3 | Chelsea | Bournemouth |
| 15:00 GMT | Viña 21'; Senesi (yellow card) 45+3' | Report | Gallagher 9'; Mudryk (yellow card) 15'; Kanté (yellow card) 20'; Badiashile (yellow card) 65', (goal) 82'; Félix 86' | Stadium: Dean Court; Attendance: 10,357; Referee: John Brooks |

| 13 May 2023 36 | Chelsea | 2–2 | Nottingham Forest | Fulham |
| 15:00 BST | Sterling 51', 58'; Félix (yellow card) 69'; Thiago Silva (yellow card) 73'; Gallagher (yellow card) 79' | Report | Awoniyi 13', 62'; Lodi (yellow card) 83' | Stadium: Stamford Bridge; Attendance: 40,030; Referee: Paul Tierney |

| 21 May 2023 37 | Manchester City | 1–0 | Chelsea | Manchester |
| 16:00 BST | Álvarez 12' | Report | Havertz (yellow card) 18'; Fernández (yellow card) 66' | Stadium: City of Manchester Stadium; Attendance: 53,490; Referee: Michael Oliver |

| 25 May 2023 32 | Manchester United | 4–1 | Chelsea | Manchester |
| 20:00 BST | Casemiro 6'; Martial 45+5'; Fernandes 73' (pen.); Malacia (yellow card) 75'; Rashford 78' | Report | Fernández (yellow card) 75'; Félix 89' | Stadium: Old Trafford; Attendance: 73,561; Referee: Stuart Attwell |

| 28 May 2023 38 | Chelsea | 1–1 | Newcastle United | Fulham |
| 16:30 BST | Trippier 27' (o.g.) | Report | Gordon 9' | Stadium: Stamford Bridge; Attendance: 40,130; Referee: Jarred Gillett |

=== FA Cup ===
Chelsea entered the competition at the third round stage and were drawn away to Manchester City.

Win Draw Loss Fixtures

| 8 January 2023 Third round | Manchester City | 4–0 | Chelsea | Manchester |
| 16:30 GMT | Mahrez 23', 85' (pen.); Álvarez 30' (pen.); Foden 38'; Rodri (yellow card) 54'; Silva (yellow card) 70'; Cancelo (yellow card) 87' | Report | Gallagher (yellow card) 62' | Stadium: City of Manchester Stadium; Attendance: 51,505; Referee: Robert Jones |

=== EFL Cup ===
Win Draw Loss Fixtures

| 9 November 2022 Third round | Manchester City | 2–0 | Chelsea | Manchester |
| 20:00 GMT | Mahrez 53'; Álvarez 58'; Grealish (yellow card) 89' | Report | Koulibaly (yellow card) 18'; Chalobah (yellow card) 52'; Azpilicueta (yellow card) 89' | Stadium: City of Manchester Stadium; Attendance: 52,148; Referee: Simon Hooper |

=== UEFA Champions League ===
==== Group stage ====
| Pos | Team | Pld | W | D | L | GF | GA | GD | Pts | Qualification | CHE | MIL | SAL | DZG |
|---|---|---|---|---|---|---|---|---|---|---|---|---|---|---|
| 1 | (England) Chelsea | 6 | 4 | 1 | 1 | 10 | 4 | +6 | 13 | Advance to knockout phase | — | 3–0 | 1–1 | 2–1 |
| 2 | (Italy) Milan | 6 | 3 | 1 | 2 | 12 | 7 | +5 | 10 | Advance to knockout phase | 0–2 | — | 4–0 | 3–1 |
| 3 | (Austria) Red Bull Salzburg | 6 | 1 | 3 | 2 | 5 | 9 | −4 | 6 | Transfer to Europa League | 1–2 | 1–1 | — | 1–0 |
| 4 | (Croatia) Dinamo Zagreb | 6 | 1 | 1 | 4 | 4 | 11 | −7 | 4 | | 1–0 | 0–4 | 1–1 | — |

Source: UEFA
Rules for classification: Group stage tiebreakers

| 6 September 2022 1 | Dinamo Zagreb (Croatia) | 1–0 | (England) Chelsea | Zagreb, Croatia |
| 18:45 CEST | Oršić 13'; Baturina (yellow card) 90+6' | Report | Mount (yellow card) 59'; Koulibaly (yellow card) 67' | Stadium: Stadion Maksimir; Attendance: 20,607; Referee: István Kovács (Romania) |

| 14 September 2022 2 | Chelsea (England) | 1–1 | (Austria) Red Bull Salzburg | London, England |
| 20:00 BST | Sterling 48'; James (yellow card) 79' | Report | Okafor 75'; Adamu (yellow card) 76'; Pavlović (yellow card) 77'; Ulmer (yellow card) 78'; Capaldo (yellow card) 89' | Stadium: Stamford Bridge; Attendance: 38,818; Referee: Ivan Kružliak (Slovakia) |

| 5 October 2022 3 | Chelsea (England) | 3–0 | (Italy) Milan | London, England |
| 20:00 BST | W. Fofana 24'; Kovačić (yellow card) 39'; Aubameyang 56'; James 62'; Thiago Silva (yellow card) 71' | Report | Krunić (yellow card) 8'; Ballo-Touré (yellow card) 15'; Tomori (yellow card) 42' | Stadium: Stamford Bridge; Attendance: 39,537; Referee: Danny Makkelie (Netherlands) |

| 11 October 2022 4 | Milan (Italy) | 0–2 | (England) Chelsea | Milan, Italy |
| 21:00 CEST | Tomori (red card) 18'; Giroud (yellow card) 20'; Gabbia (yellow card) 32'; Krunić (yellow card) 35'; Pobega (yellow card) 66'; Tonali (yellow card) 89'; Ballo-Touré (yellow card) 90' | Report | Mount (yellow card) 20'; Jorginho 21' (pen.); Sterling (yellow card) 29'; Aubameyang 34'; Gallagher (yellow card) 86' | Stadium: San Siro; Attendance: 75,051; Referee: Daniel Siebert (Germany) |

| 25 October 2022 5 | Red Bull Salzburg (Austria) | 1–2 | (England) Chelsea | Salzburg, Austria |
| 18:45 CEST | Sučić (yellow card) 47'; Adamu 49' | Report | Kovačić 23'; Havertz 64'; Gallagher (yellow card) 85'; Arrizabalaga (yellow card) 90+2' | Stadium: Stadion Wals-Siezenheim; Attendance: 29,520; Referee: Sandro Schärer (Switzerland) |

| 2 November 2022 6 | Chelsea (England) | 2–1 | (Croatia) Dinamo Zagreb | London, England |
| 20:00 GMT | Sterling 18'; Zakaria 30'; Koulibaly (yellow card) 39' | Report | Petković 7'; Mišić (yellow card) 22'; Ivanušec (yellow card) 54'; Moharrami (yellow card) 89' | Stadium: Stamford Bridge; Attendance: 39,392; Referee: François Letexier (France) |

==== Knockout phase ====
===== Round of 16 =====
The round of 16 draw was held on 7 November 2022.

Chelsea were drawn against German side Borussia Dortmund in the round of 16, with the first leg away from home as they progressed as group winners.

| 15 February 2023 First leg | Borussia Dortmund (Germany) | 1–0 | (England) Chelsea | Dortmund, Germany |
| 21:00 CET | Bellingham (yellow card) 49'; Can (yellow card) 53'; Adeyemi 63', (yellow card) 77'; Özcan (yellow card) 85'; Ryerson (yellow card) 90'; Süle (yellow card) 90' | Report | James (yellow card) 9'; Thiago Silva (yellow card) 16'; Ziyech (yellow card) 72'; Mount (yellow card) 90' | Stadium: Signal Iduna Park; Attendance: 81,365; Referee: Jesús Gil Manzano (Spain) |

| 7 March 2023 Second leg | Chelsea (England) | 2–0 (2–1 agg.) | (Germany) Borussia Dortmund | London, England |
| 20:10 GMT | Sterling 43'; Havertz 53' (pen.); Arrizabalaga (yellow card) 65'; Fernández (yellow card) 77'; Chilwell (yellow card) 90+2'; Cucurella (yellow card) 90+6' | Report | Süle (yellow card) 41'; Wolf (yellow card) 90+2'; Bellingham (yellow card) 90+8' | Stadium: Stamford Bridge; Attendance: 38,882; Referee: Danny Makkelie (Netherlands) |
Note: The match was originally scheduled to kick-off at 20:00 GMT, but was delayed by ten minutes due to the late arrival of the bus to the stadium carrying Borussia Dortmund's team.

===== Quarter-finals =====
The quarter-finals draw was held on 17 March 2023.

Chelsea were drawn against Spanish side and defending champions Real Madrid, with the first leg away from home.

| 12 April 2023 First leg | Real Madrid (Spain) | 2–0 | (England) Chelsea | Madrid, Spain |
| 20:00 GMT | Camavinga (yellow card) 7'; Benzema 21'; Asensio 74'; Militão (yellow card) 84'; Carvajal (yellow card) 87' | Report | W. Fofana (yellow card) 5'; Chilwell (red card) 59'; Kovačić (yellow card) 87' | Stadium: Santiago Bernabéu; Attendance: 63,142; Referee: François Letexier (France) |

| 18 April 2023 Second leg | Chelsea (England) | 0–2 (0–4 agg.) | (Spain) Real Madrid | London, England |
| 20:00 GMT | Cucurella (yellow card) 34'; James (yellow card) 50'; Mudryk (yellow card) 89' | Report | Militão (yellow card) 22'; Rodrygo 58', 80' | Stadium: Stamford Bridge; Attendance: 39,453; Referee: Daniele Orsato (Italy) |

== Statistics ==
=== Appearances ===
| No. | Pos. | Player | Premier League | FA Cup | EFL Cup | UEFA Champions League | Total |
|---|---|---|---|---|---|---|---|
| 1 | GK | (Spain) Kepa Arrizabalaga | 29 | 1 | 0 | 9 | 39 |
| 4 | DF | (France) Benoît Badiashile | 11 | 0 | 0 | 0 | 11 |
| 5 | MF | (Argentina) Enzo Fernández | 18 | 0 | 0 | 4 | 22 |
| 6 | DF | (Brazil) Thiago Silva | 27 | 0 | 0 | 8 | 35 |
| 7 | MF | (France) N'Golo Kanté | 7 | 0 | 0 | 2 | 9 |
| 8 | MF | (Croatia) Mateo Kovačić | 27 | 1 | 1 | 8 | 37 |
| 9 | FW | (Gabon) Pierre-Emerick Aubameyang | 15 | 0 | 0 | 6 | 21 |
| 10 | FW | (United States) Christian Pulisic | 23 | 0 | 1 | 5 | 29 |
| 11 | FW | (Portugal) João Félix | 16 | 0 | 0 | 4 | 20 |
| 12 | MF | (England) Ruben Loftus-Cheek | 25 | 0 | 1 | 7 | 33 |
| 13 | GK | (England) Marcus Bettinelli | 0 | 0 | 0 | 0 | 0 |
| 14 | DF | (England) Trevoh Chalobah | 25 | 1 | 1 | 6 | 33 |
| 15 | FW | (Ukraine) Mykhailo Mudryk | 15 | 0 | 0 | 2 | 17 |
| 16 | GK | (Senegal) Édouard Mendy | 10 | 0 | 1 | 1 | 12 |
| 17 | FW | (England) Raheem Sterling | 28 | 0 | 1 | 9 | 38 |
| 18 | FW | (Albania) Armando Broja | 12 | 0 | 1 | 5 | 18 |
| 19 | MF | (England) Mason Mount | 24 | 1 | 1 | 9 | 35 |
| 20 | MF | (Switzerland) Denis Zakaria | 7 | 1 | 1 | 2 | 11 |
| 21 | DF | (England) Ben Chilwell | 23 | 0 | 0 | 7 | 30 |
| 22 | FW | (Morocco) Hakim Ziyech | 17 | 1 | 1 | 4 | 23 |
| 23 | MF | (England) Conor Gallagher | 35 | 1 | 1 | 8 | 45 |
| 24 | DF | (England) Reece James | 16 | 0 | 0 | 8 | 24 |
| 26 | DF | (Senegal) Kalidou Koulibaly | 23 | 1 | 1 | 7 | 32 |
| 27 | FW | (Ivory Coast) David Datro Fofana | 3 | 1 | 0 | 0 | 4 |
| 28 | DF | (Spain) César Azpilicueta | 25 | 1 | 1 | 5 | 32 |
| 29 | FW | (Germany) Kai Havertz | 35 | 1 | 1 | 10 | 47 |
| 30 | MF | (England) Carney Chukwuemeka | 14 | 1 | 0 | 0 | 15 |
| 31 | FW | (England) Noni Madueke | 12 | 0 | 0 | 0 | 12 |
| 32 | DF | (Spain) Marc Cucurella | 24 | 0 | 1 | 8 | 33 |
| 33 | DF | (France) Wesley Fofana | 15 | 0 | 0 | 5 | 20 |
| 42 | DF | (England) Bashir Humphreys | 0 | 1 | 0 | 0 | 1 |
| 56 | MF | (England) Omari Hutchinson | 1 | 1 | 0 | 0 | 2 |
| 67 | MF | (England) Lewis Hall | 9 | 1 | 1 | 0 | 11 |
Players who left the club during the season
| 5 | MF | (Italy) Jorginho | 18 | 1 | 0 | 6 | 25 |

Source: FBref.com

=== Goalscorers ===
| Rank | No. | Pos. | Player | Premier League | FA Cup | EFL Cup | UEFA Champions League | Total |
|---|---|---|---|---|---|---|---|---|
| 1 | 29 | FW | (Germany) Kai Havertz | 7 | 0 | 0 | 2 | 9 |
| 1 | 17 | FW | (England) Raheem Sterling | 6 | 0 | 0 | 3 | 9 |
| 3 | 11 | FW | (Portugal) João Félix | 4 | 0 | 0 | 0 | 4 |
| 4 | 9 | FW | (Gabon) Pierre-Emerick Aubameyang | 1 | 0 | 0 | 2 | 3 |
| 4 | 19 | MF | (England) Mason Mount | 3 | 0 | 0 | 0 | 3 |
| 4 | 23 | MF | (England) Conor Gallagher | 3 | 0 | 0 | 0 | 3 |
| 8 | 8 | MF | (Croatia) Mateo Kovačić | 1 | 0 | 0 | 1 | 2 |
| 8 | 21 | DF | (England) Ben Chilwell | 2 | 0 | 0 | 0 | 2 |
| 8 | 24 | DF | (England) Reece James | 1 | 0 | 0 | 1 | 2 |
| 8 | 26 | DF | (Senegal) Kalidou Koulibaly | 2 | 0 | 0 | 0 | 2 |
| 8 | 33 | DF | (France) Wesley Fofana | 1 | 0 | 0 | 1 | 2 |
| 13 | 4 | DF | (France) Benoît Badiashile | 1 | 0 | 0 | 0 | 1 |
| 13 | 10 | FW | (United States) Christian Pulisic | 1 | 0 | 0 | 0 | 1 |
| 13 | 18 | FW | (Albania) Armando Broja | 1 | 0 | 0 | 0 | 1 |
| 13 | 20 | MF | (Switzerland) Denis Zakaria | 0 | 0 | 0 | 1 | 1 |
| 13 | 31 | FW | (England) Noni Madueke | 1 | 0 | 0 | 0 | 1 |
| Own goals | | | | 1 | 0 | 0 | 0 | 1 |
Players who have left the club
| | 5 | MF | (Italy) Jorginho | 2 | 0 | 0 | 1 | 3 |
| Totals | | | | 38 | 0 | 0 | 12 | 50 |

Source: FBref.com

=== Top assists ===
| Rank | No. | Pos. | Player | Premier League | FA Cup | EFL Cup | UEFA Champions League | Total |
|---|---|---|---|---|---|---|---|---|
| 1 | 17 | FW | (England) Raheem Sterling | 3 | 0 | 0 | 1 | 4 |
| 1 | 19 | MF | (England) Mason Mount | 2 | 0 | 0 | 1 | 3 |
| 3 | 22 | FW | (Morocco) Hakim Ziyech | 3 | 0 | 0 | 0 | 3 |
| 4 | 5 | MF | (Argentina) Enzo Fernández | 2 | 0 | 0 | 0 | 2 |
| 4 | 6 | DF | (Brazil) Thiago Silva | 2 | 0 | 0 | 0 | 2 |
| 4 | 8 | MF | (Croatia) Mateo Kovačić | 2 | 0 | 0 | 0 | 2 |
| 4 | 10 | FW | (United States) Christian Pulisic | 1 | 0 | 0 | 1 | 2 |
| 4 | 15 | FW | (Ukraine) Mykhailo Mudryk | 2 | 0 | 0 | 0 | 2 |
| 4 | 21 | DF | (England) Ben Chilwell | 2 | 0 | 0 | 0 | 2 |
| 4 | 24 | DF | (England) Reece James | 1 | 0 | 0 | 1 | 2 |
| 4 | 32 | DF | (Spain) Marc Cucurella | 2 | 0 | 0 | 0 | 2 |
| 4 | 12 | MF | (England) Ruben Loftus-Cheek | 1 | 0 | 0 | 1 | 2 |
| 13 | 7 | MF | (France) N'Golo Kanté | 1 | 0 | 0 | 0 | 1 |
| 13 | 9 | FW | (Gabon) Pierre-Emerick Aubameyang | 0 | 0 | 0 | 1 | 1 |
| 13 | 23 | MF | (England) Conor Gallagher | 1 | 0 | 0 | 0 | 1 |
| 13 | 26 | DF | (Senegal) Kalidou Koulibaly | 1 | 0 | 0 | 0 | 1 |
| 13 | 29 | FW | (Germany) Kai Havertz | 1 | 0 | 0 | 0 | 1 |
| 13 | Totals | | | 27 | 0 | 0 | 7 | 34 |

Source: FBref.com

=== Clean sheets ===
| Rank | No. | Pos. | Player | Premier League | FA Cup | EFL Cup | UEFA Champions League | Total |
|---|---|---|---|---|---|---|---|---|
| 1 | 1 | GK | (Spain) Kepa Arrizabalaga | 9 | 0 | 0 | 3 | 12 |
| 2 | 16 | GK | (Senegal) Edouard Mendy | 1 | 0 | 0 | 0 | 1 |
| Totals | | | | 10 | 0 | 0 | 3 | 13 |

Source: FBref.com

=== Discipline ===
| No. | Pos. | Player | Premier League | | | FA Cup | | | EFL Cup | | | UEFA Champions League | | | Total | | |
| No. | Pos. | Player | Yellow card | (yellow card) (yellow-red card) | Red card | Yellow card | (yellow card) (yellow-red card) | Red card | Yellow card | (yellow card) (yellow-red card) | Red card | Yellow card | (yellow card) (yellow-red card) | Red card | Yellow card | (yellow card) (yellow-red card) | Red card |
|---|---|---|---|---|---|---|---|---|---|---|---|---|---|---|---|---|---|
| 1 | GK | (Spain) Kepa Arrizabalaga | 1 | 0 | 0 | 0 | 0 | 0 | 0 | 0 | 0 | 2 | 0 | 0 | 3 | 0 | 0 |
| 4 | DF | (France) Benoît Badiashile | 2 | 0 | 0 | 0 | 0 | 0 | 0 | 0 | 0 | 0 | 0 | 0 | 2 | 0 | 0 |
| 5 | MF | (Italy) Jorginho | 4 | 0 | 0 | 0 | 0 | 0 | 0 | 0 | 0 | 0 | 0 | 0 | 4 | 0 | 0 |
| 5 | MF | (Argentina) Enzo Fernández | 3 | 0 | 0 | 0 | 0 | 0 | 0 | 0 | 0 | 1 | 0 | 0 | 4 | 0 | 0 |
| 6 | DF | (Brazil) Thiago Silva | 2 | 0 | 0 | 0 | 0 | 0 | 0 | 0 | 0 | 2 | 0 | 0 | 4 | 0 | 0 |
| 7 | MF | (France) N'Golo Kanté | 1 | 0 | 0 | 0 | 0 | 0 | 0 | 0 | 0 | 0 | 0 | 0 | 1 | 0 | 0 |
| 8 | MF | (Croatia) Mateo Kovačić | 8 | 0 | 0 | 0 | 0 | 0 | 0 | 0 | 0 | 2 | 0 | 0 | 10 | 0 | 0 |
| 9 | FW | (Gabon) Pierre-Emerick Aubameyang | 1 | 0 | 0 | 0 | 0 | 0 | 0 | 0 | 0 | 0 | 0 | 0 | 1 | 0 | 0 |
| 10 | FW | (United States) Christian Pulisic | 1 | 0 | 0 | 0 | 0 | 0 | 0 | 0 | 0 | 0 | 0 | 0 | 1 | 0 | 0 |
| 11 | FW | (Portugal) João Félix | 1 | 0 | 1 | 0 | 0 | 0 | 0 | 0 | 0 | 0 | 0 | 0 | 1 | 0 | 1 |
| 12 | MF | (England) Ruben Loftus-Cheek | 1 | 0 | 0 | 0 | 0 | 0 | 0 | 0 | 0 | 0 | 0 | 0 | 1 | 0 | 0 |
| 13 | GK | (England) Marcus Bettinelli | 0 | 0 | 0 | 0 | 0 | 0 | 0 | 0 | 0 | 0 | 0 | 0 | 0 | 0 | 0 |
| 14 | DF | (England) Trevoh Chalobah | 4 | 0 | 0 | 0 | 0 | 0 | 1 | 0 | 0 | 0 | 0 | 0 | 5 | 0 | 0 |
| 15 | FW | (Ukraine) Mykhailo Mudryk | 1 | 0 | 0 | 0 | 0 | 0 | 0 | 0 | 0 | 1 | 0 | 0 | 2 | 0 | 0 |
| 16 | GK | (Senegal) Édouard Mendy | 1 | 0 | 0 | 0 | 0 | 0 | 0 | 0 | 0 | 0 | 0 | 0 | 1 | 0 | 0 |
| 17 | MF | (England) Raheem Sterling | 4 | 0 | 0 | 0 | 0 | 0 | 0 | 0 | 0 | 1 | 0 | 0 | 5 | 0 | 0 |
| 18 | MF | (Albania) Armando Broja | 0 | 0 | 0 | 0 | 0 | 0 | 0 | 0 | 0 | 0 | 0 | 0 | 0 | 0 | 0 |
| 19 | MF | (England) Mason Mount | 4 | 0 | 0 | 0 | 0 | 0 | 0 | 0 | 0 | 3 | 0 | 0 | 7 | 0 | 0 |
| 20 | MF | (Switzerland) Denis Zakaria | 0 | 0 | 0 | 0 | 0 | 0 | 0 | 0 | 0 | 0 | 0 | 0 | 0 | 0 | 0 |
| 21 | DF | (England) Ben Chilwell | 3 | 0 | 0 | 0 | 0 | 0 | 0 | 0 | 0 | 1 | 0 | 1 | 4 | 0 | 1 |
| 22 | FW | (Morocco) Hakim Ziyech | 1 | 0 | 0 | 0 | 0 | 0 | 0 | 0 | 0 | 1 | 0 | 0 | 2 | 0 | 0 |
| 23 | FW | (England) Conor Gallagher | 9 | 1 | 0 | 1 | 0 | 0 | 0 | 0 | 0 | 2 | 0 | 0 | 12 | 1 | 0 |
| 24 | DF | (England) Reece James | 4 | 0 | 0 | 0 | 0 | 0 | 0 | 0 | 0 | 3 | 0 | 0 | 7 | 0 | 0 |
| 26 | DF | (Senegal) Kalidou Koulibaly | 5 | 1 | 0 | 0 | 0 | 0 | 1 | 0 | 0 | 2 | 0 | 0 | 8 | 1 | 0 |
| 27 | FW | (Ivory Coast) David Datro Fofana | 0 | 0 | 0 | 0 | 0 | 0 | 0 | 0 | 0 | 0 | 0 | 0 | 0 | 0 | 0 |
| 28 | DF | (Spain) César Azpilicueta | 3 | 0 | 0 | 0 | 0 | 0 | 1 | 0 | 0 | 0 | 0 | 0 | 4 | 0 | 0 |
| 29 | FW | (Germany) Kai Havertz | 5 | 0 | 0 | 0 | 0 | 0 | 0 | 0 | 0 | 0 | 0 | 0 | 5 | 0 | 0 |
| 30 | MF | (England) Carney Chukwuemeka | 0 | 0 | 0 | 0 | 0 | 0 | 0 | 0 | 0 | 0 | 0 | 0 | 0 | 0 | 0 |
| 31 | FW | (England) Noni Madueke | 0 | 0 | 0 | 0 | 0 | 0 | 0 | 0 | 0 | 0 | 0 | 0 | 0 | 0 | 0 |
| 32 | DF | (Spain) Marc Cucurella | 4 | 0 | 0 | 0 | 0 | 0 | 0 | 0 | 0 | 2 | 0 | 0 | 6 | 0 | 0 |
| 33 | DF | (France) Wesley Fofana | 3 | 0 | 0 | 0 | 0 | 0 | 0 | 0 | 0 | 1 | 0 | 0 | 4 | 0 | 0 |
| 42 | DF | (England) Bashir Humphreys | 0 | 0 | 0 | 0 | 0 | 0 | 0 | 0 | 0 | 0 | 0 | 0 | 0 | 0 | 0 |
| 56 | MF | (Jamaica) Omari Hutchinson | 0 | 0 | 0 | 0 | 0 | 0 | 0 | 0 | 0 | 0 | 0 | 0 | 0 | 0 | 0 |
| 67 | MF | (England) Lewis Hall | 1 | 0 | 0 | 0 | 0 | 0 | 0 | 0 | 0 | 0 | 0 | 0 | 1 | 0 | 0 |
| — | | (Germany) Thomas Tuchel | 0 | 0 | 1 | 0 | 0 | 0 | 0 | 0 | 0 | 1 | 0 | 0 | 1 | 0 | 1 |
| — | | (England) Graham Potter | 0 | 0 | 0 | 0 | 0 | 0 | 0 | 0 | 0 | 0 | 0 | 0 | 0 | 0 | 0 |
| — | | (Spain) Bruno Saltor | 0 | 0 | 0 | 0 | 0 | 0 | 0 | 0 | 0 | 0 | 0 | 0 | 0 | 0 | 0 |
| — | | (England) Frank Lampard | 0 | 0 | 0 | 0 | 0 | 0 | 0 | 0 | 0 | 0 | 0 | 0 | 0 | 0 | 0 |
| Totals | | | 77 | 2 | 2 | 1 | 0 | 0 | 3 | 0 | 0 | 25 | 0 | 1 | 106 | 2 | 3 |

Source: FBref.com

== Awards ==
=== Players ===
| No. | Pos. | Player | Award | Source |
|---|---|---|---|---|
| 1 | GK | (Spain) Kepa Arrizabalaga | October 2022 Premier League Save of the Month | |
| 1 | GK | (Spain) Kepa Arrizabalaga | 2022–23 Premier League Save of the Season | |
