= List of Indonesia international footballers born or raised outside Indonesia =

This is a list of Indonesia international footballers who were born or grew up outside Indonesia. Players born in or raised in other countries may qualify for the Indonesia national team through parents or grandparents, or through 10-years residency and subsequent naturalization as Indonesian citizens.

== Men ==
=== Naturalized citizens of Indonesia ===
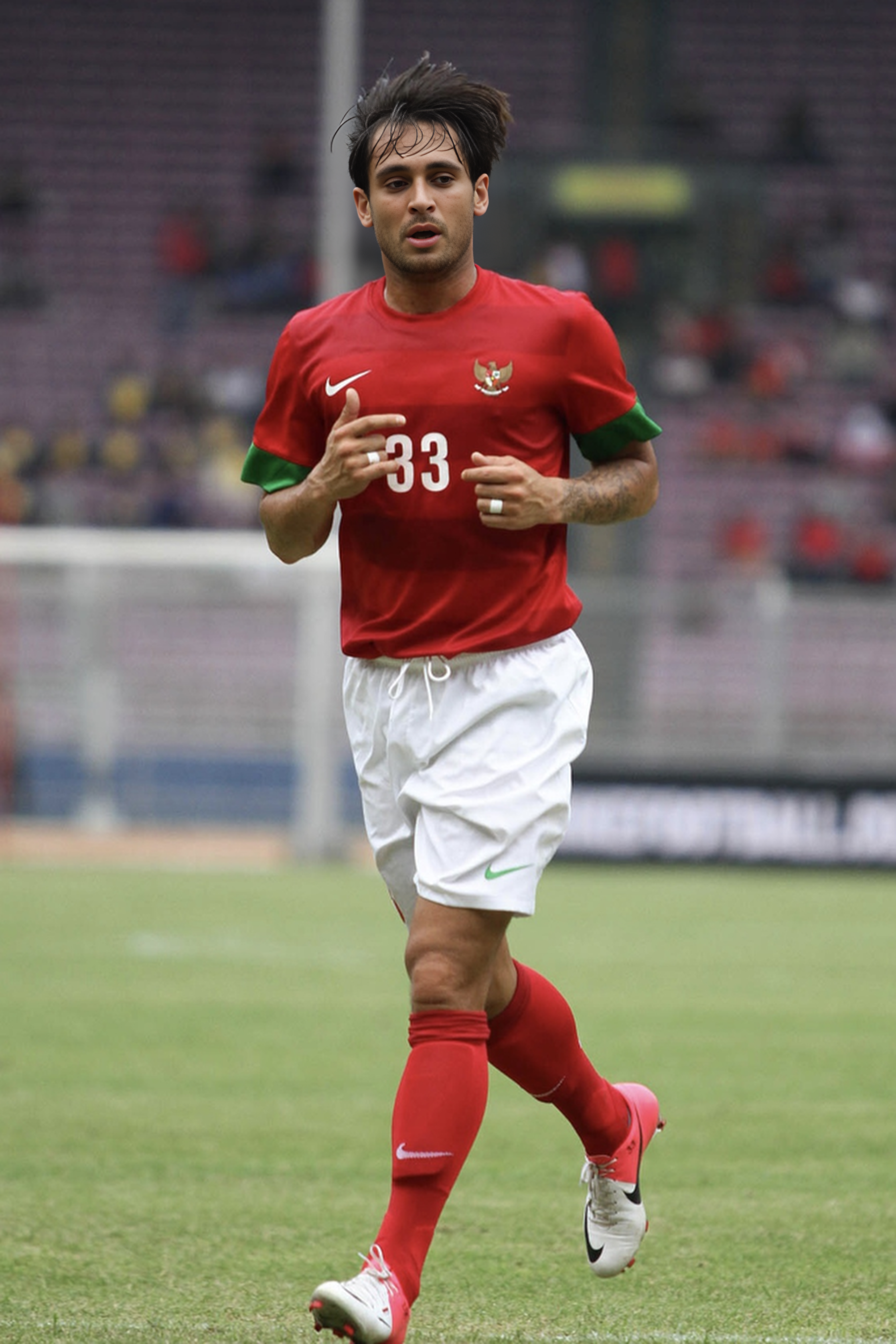
Tonnie Cusell has been naturalized as Indonesia citizen since October 2011

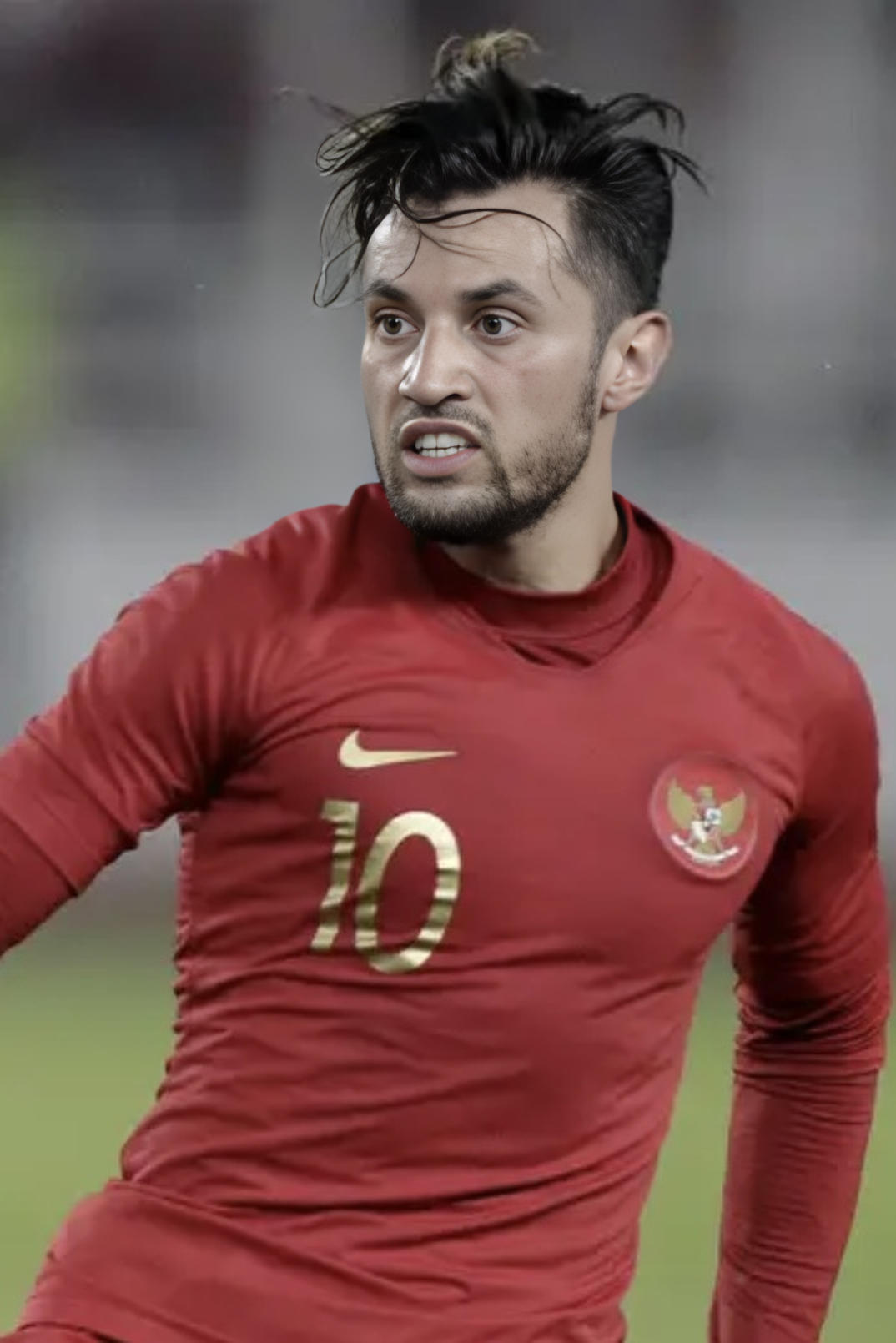
Stefano Lilipaly made 32 appearances for Indonesia since being naturalized in October 2011

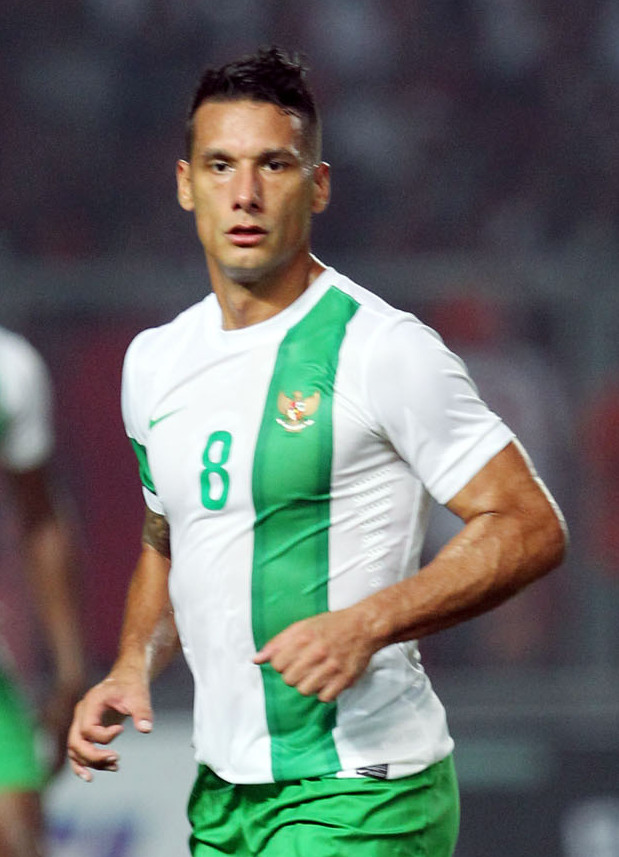
Raphael Maitimo made 21 appearances for the national team since being naturalized in November 2012

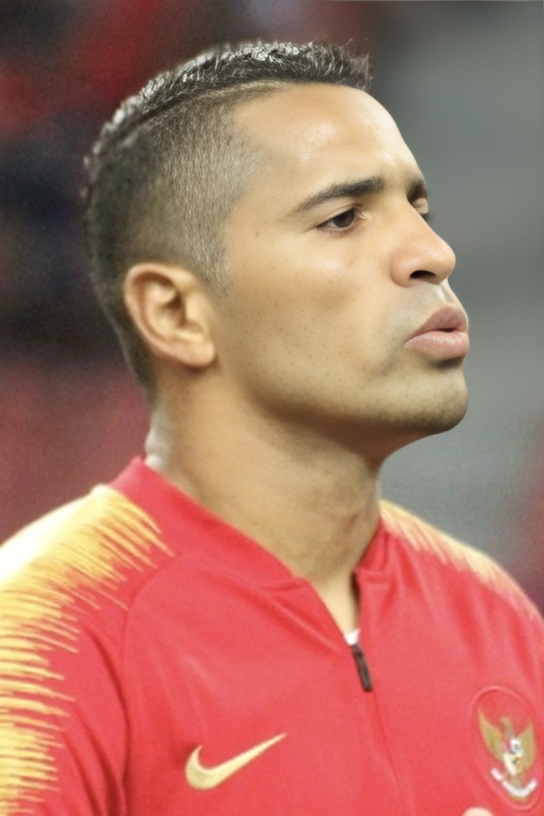
Beto Gonçalves has scored 10 goals in 12 appearances for Indonesia since being naturalized in February 2018

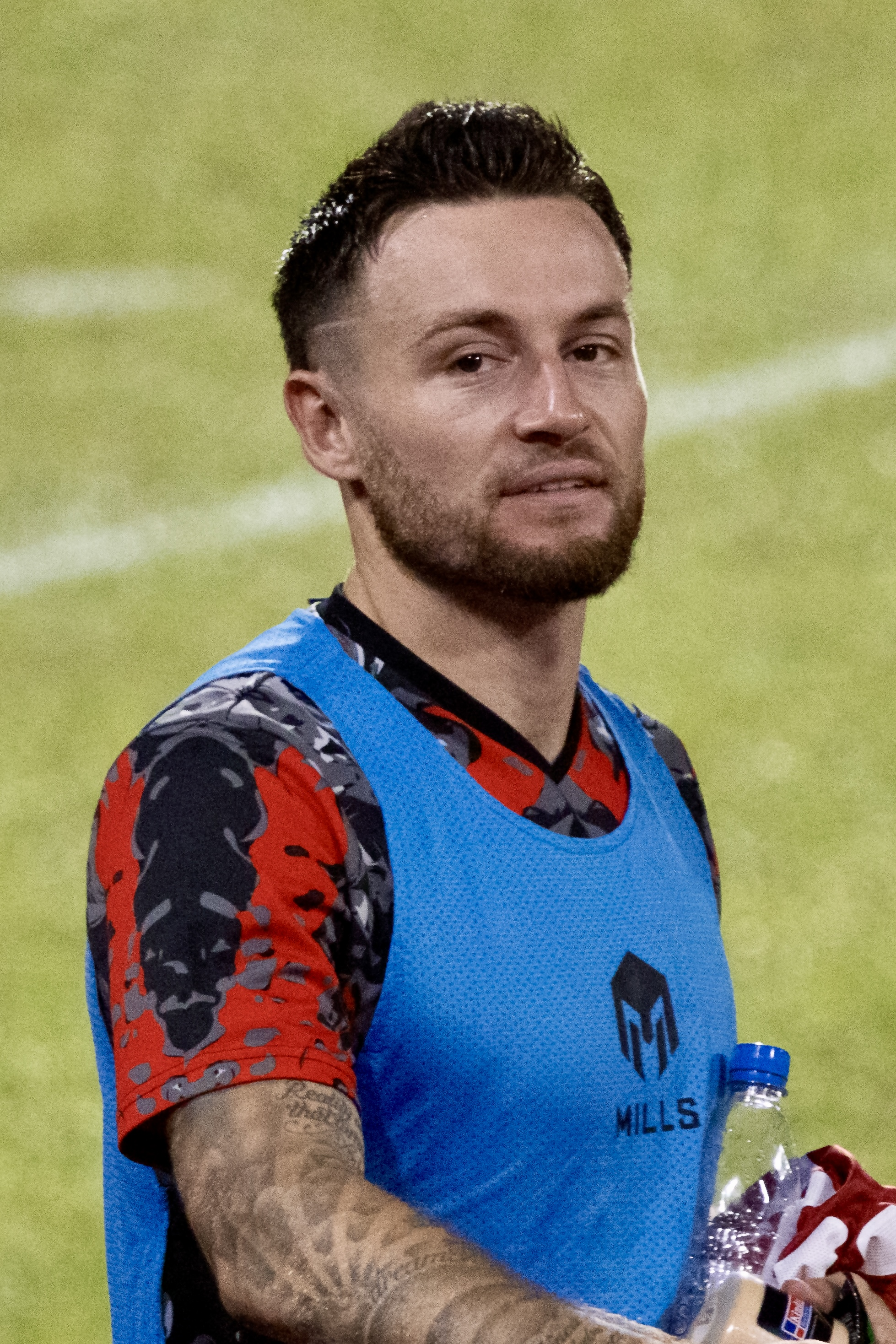
Marc Klok made 21 appearances for Indonesia since being naturalized in November 2020

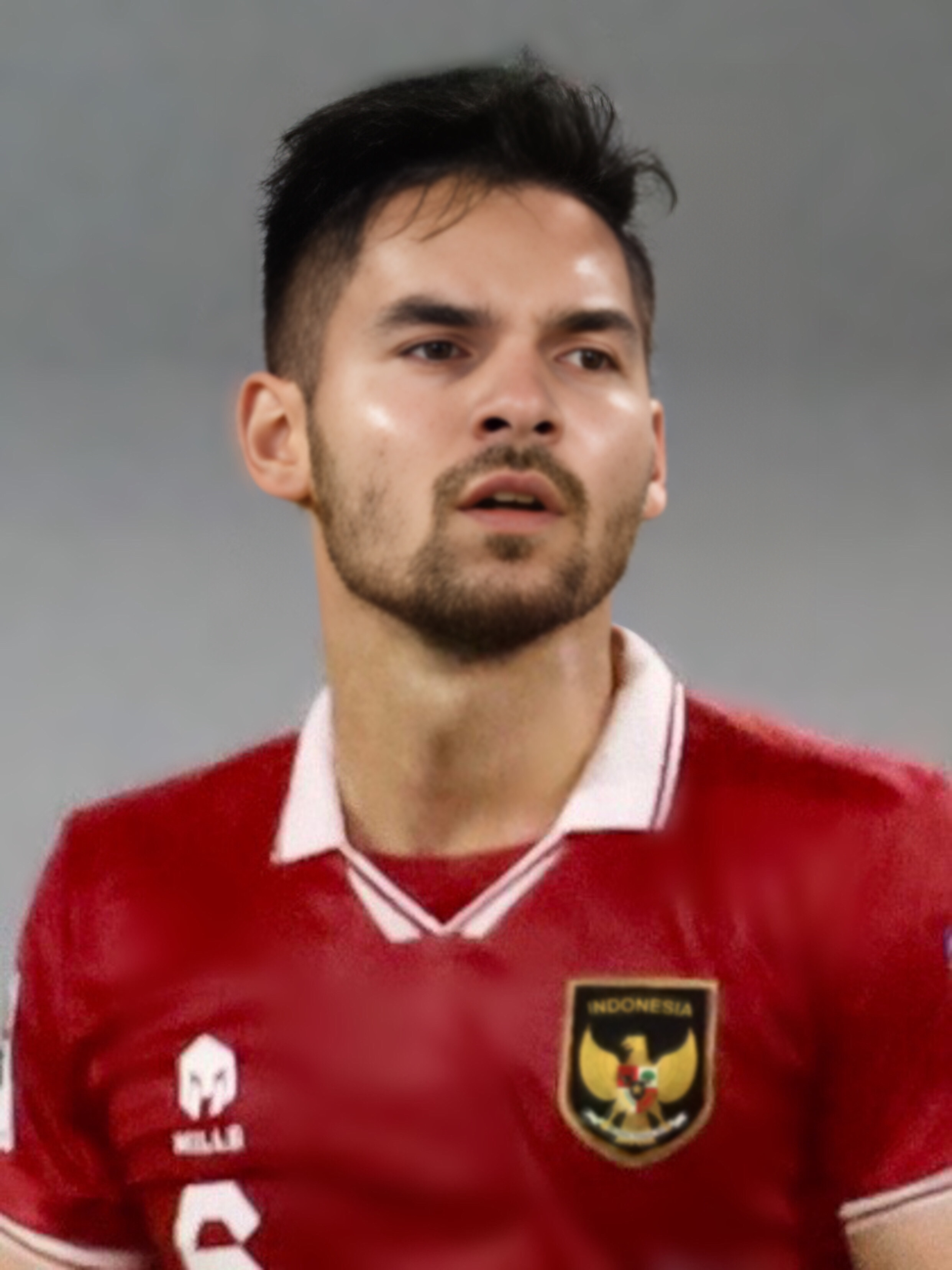
Sandy Walsh has been naturalized as Indonesia citizen since November 2022

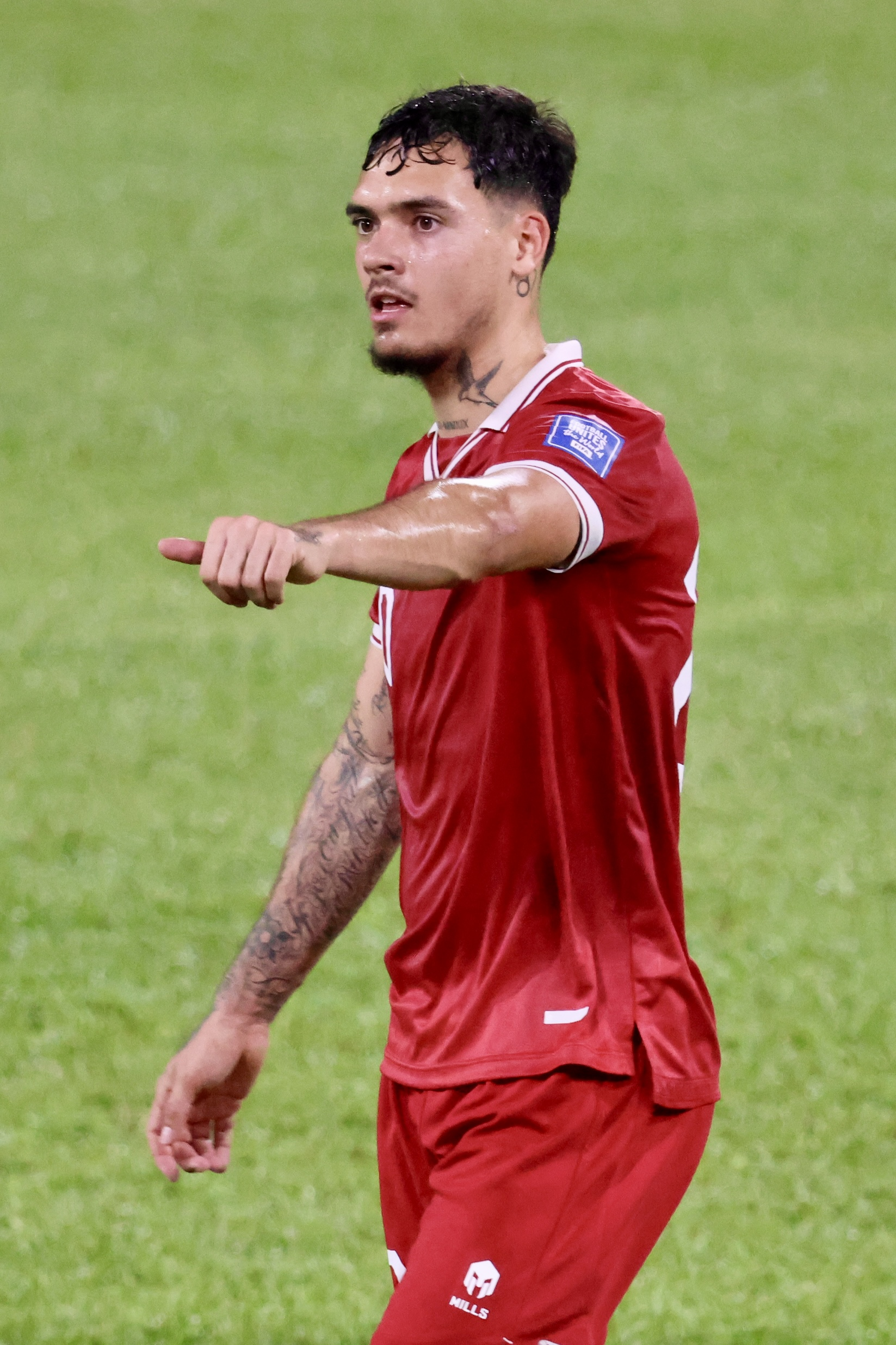
Shayne Pattynama has been naturalized as Indonesia citizen since January 2023

Ivar Jenner has been naturalized as Indonesia citizen since May 2023

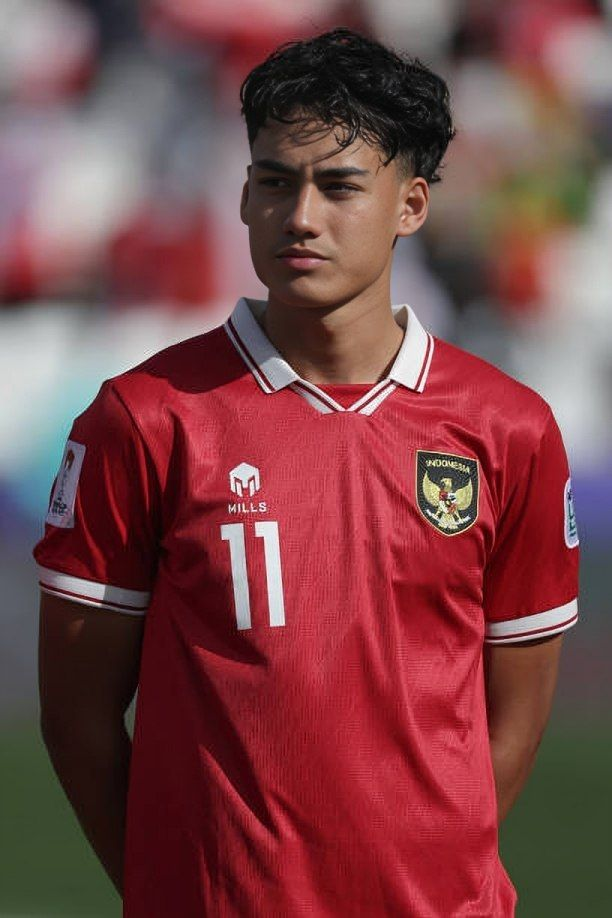
Rafael Struick made 24 appearances for Indonesia since being naturalized in May 2023

Jay Idzes jas been naturalized as Indonesia citizen since December 2023

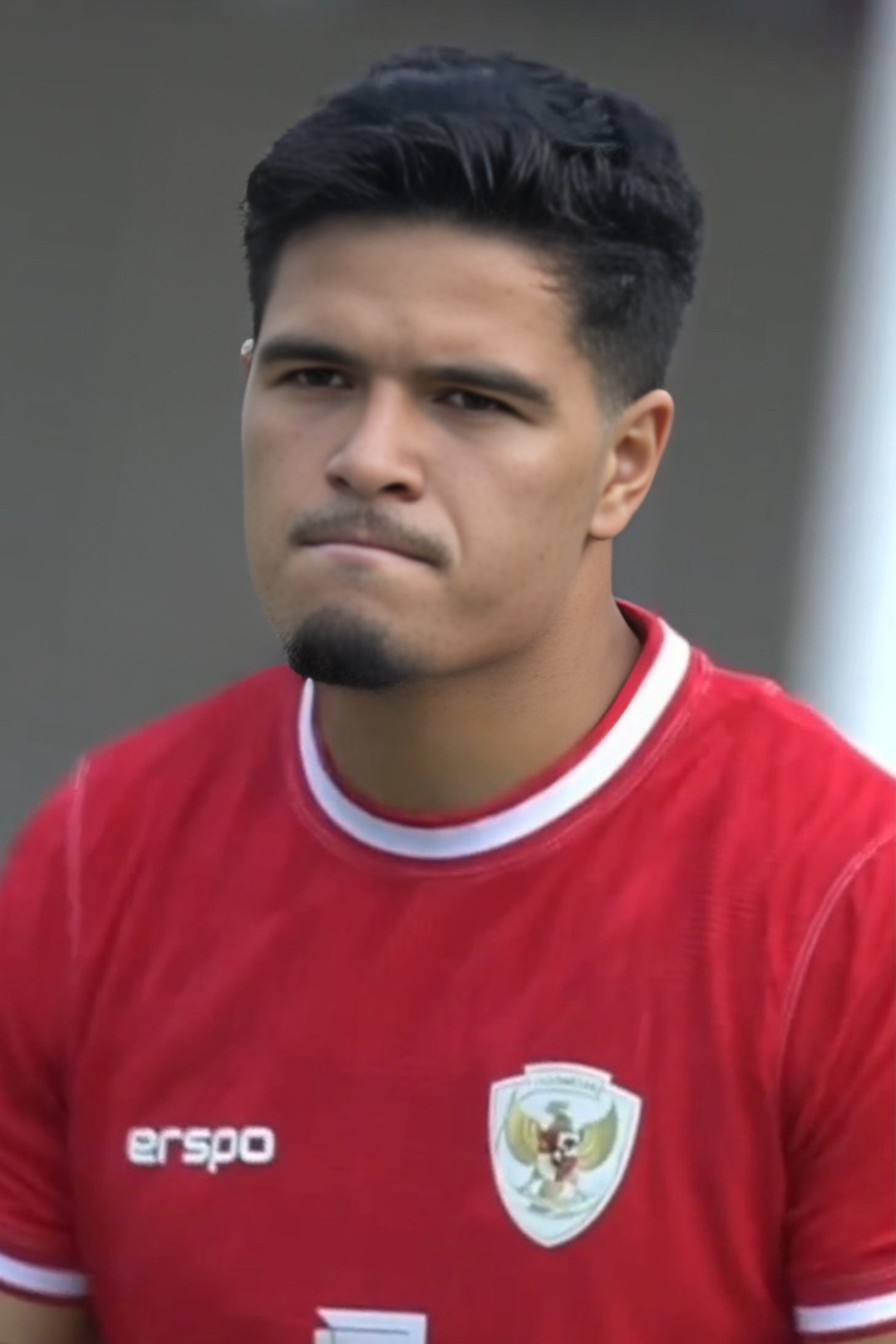
Ragnar Oratmangoen has been naturalized as Indonesia citizen since March 2024

Maarten Paes has been naturalized as Indonesia citizen since April 2024

Calvin Verdonk has been naturalized as Indonesia citizen since June 2024

Kevin Diks lead Indonesia to won the 2026 FIFA ASEAN Cup

Ole Romeny has scored 7 goals in 13 appearances for Indonesia since being naturalized in March 2025

Joey Pelupessy has been naturalized as Indonesia citizen since March 2025

Mitchell Baker has scored 9 goals in 8 appearances for Indonesia since being naturalized in July 2026

The following players born elsewhere and were naturalized via the formal process (either through residency or through descent) and went on to play for the Indonesia senior national team – Indonesian nationality law does not permit dual citizenship, so all the listed players had to give up their other nationalities.

No.	Name	Born	Place of birth	Origin	Naturalized	National career	Caps	Goals
1	Cristian Gonzáles	1976	(Uruguay) Montevideo	Uruguay	3 November 2010	2010–2015	32	13
2	Kim Kurniawan	1990	(Germany) Mühlacker	Germany	6 December 2010	2015	1	0
3	Diego Michiels	1990	(Netherlands) Deventer	Netherlands	7 April 2011	2012–2014	3	0
4	Greg Nwokolo	1986	(Nigeria) Onitsha	Nigeria	10 October 2011	2013–2019	8	2
5	Victor Igbonefo	1985	(Nigeria) Enugu	Nigeria	10 October 2011	2013–2021	14	0
6	Jhon van Beukering	1983	(Netherlands) Velp	Netherlands	10 October 2011	2012	3	0
7	Tonnie Cusell	1983	(Netherlands) Amsterdam	Netherlands	10 October 2011	2012	3	0
8	Stefano Lilipaly	1990	(Netherlands) Amsterdam	Netherlands	10 October 2011	2013–2025	34	3
9	Raphael Maitimo	1984	(Netherlands) Rotterdam	Netherlands	23 November 2011	2012–2015	21	4
10	Sergio van Dijk	1982	(Netherlands) Assen	Netherlands	11 February 2013	2013–2014	6	1
11	Bio Paulin	1984	(Cameroon) Nanga Eboko	Cameroon	23 March 2015	2015	1	0
12	Ezra Walian	1997	(Netherlands) Amsterdam	Netherlands	20 March 2017	2017–2021	9	3
13	Ilija Spasojević	1987	(Montenegro) Bar (Note: Born in Montenegro, when it was still part of Yugoslavia)	Montenegro	25 October 2017	2017–2023	7	4
14	Beto Gonçalves	1980	(Brazil) Belém	Brazil	8 February 2018	2018–2019	12	10
15	Estebán Vizcarra	1986	(Argentina) Belén de Escobar	Argentina	16 March 2018	2018	1	0
16	Osas Saha	1986	(Nigeria) Lagos	Nigeria	16 May 2018	2019	2	0
17	Otávio Dutra	1983	(Brazil) Fortaleza	Brazil	27 September 2019	2019	2	0
18	Marc Klok	1993	(Netherlands) Amsterdam	Netherlands	12 November 2020	2022–	27	5
19	Jordi Amat	1992	(Spain) Canet de Mar	Spain	17 November 2022	2022–	25	2
20	Rafael Struick	2003	(Netherlands) Leidschendam	Netherlands	22 May 2023	2023–	26	1
21	Ivar Jenner	2004	(Netherlands) Utrecht	Netherlands	22 May 2023	2023–	33	0
22	Shayne Pattynama	1998	(Netherlands) Lelystad	Netherlands	24 January 2023	2023–	18	2
23	Sandy Walsh	1995	(Belgium) Brussels	Netherlands	17 November 2022	2023–	26	4
24	Justin Hubner	2003	(Netherlands) 's-Hertogenbosch	Netherlands	6 December 2023	2024–	25	2
25	Jay Idzes	2000	(Netherlands) Mierlo	Netherlands	28 December 2023	2024–	18	1
26	Nathan Tjoe-A-On	2001	(Netherlands) Rotterdam	Netherlands	11 March 2024	2024–	19	0
27	Ragnar Oratmangoen	1998	(Netherlands) Oss	Netherlands	18 March 2024	2024–	24	5
28	Thom Haye	1995	(Netherlands) Amsterdam	Netherlands	18 March 2024	2024–	25	3
29	Maarten Paes	1998	(Netherlands) Nijmegen	Netherlands	30 April 2024	2024–	14	0
30	Calvin Verdonk	1997	(Netherlands) Dordrecht	Netherlands	4 June 2024	2024–	20	0
31	Mees Hilgers	2001	(Netherlands) Amersfoort	Netherlands	30 September 2024	2024–	4	0
32	Eliano Reijnders	2000	(Finland) Tampere (Note: Born in Finland, when his father played professionally there at the time)	Netherlands	30 September 2024	2024–	13	1
33	Kevin Diks	1996	(Netherlands) Apeldoorn	Netherlands	8 November 2024	2024–	16	3
34	Ole Romeny	2000	(Netherlands) Nijmegen	Netherlands	8 February 2025	2025–	14	7
35	Dean James	2000	(Netherlands) Leiden	Netherlands	10 March 2025	2025–	9	1
36	Joey Pelupessy	1993	(Netherlands) Nijverdal	Netherlands	10 March 2025	2025–	14	0
37	Mauro Zijlstra	2004	(Netherlands) Zaandam	Netherlands	29 August 2025	2025–	5	1
38	Miliano Jonathans	2004	(Netherlands) Arnhem	Netherlands	3 September 2025	2025–	4	0
39	Mitchell Baker	2006	(Australia) Melbourne	Australia	13 July 2026	2026–	8	9
40	Jens Raven	2005	(Netherlands) Dordrecht	Netherlands	27 June 2024	2026–	3	1
41	Tim Geypens	2005	(Netherlands) Oldenzaal	Netherlands	8 February 2025	2026–	3	0
42	Luke Vickery	2005	(United States) Kailua (Note: Born in the United States, when his parents (without Australian ancestry) briefly live there)	Australia	16 July 2026	2026–	4	1

=== Existing Indonesian nationality ===
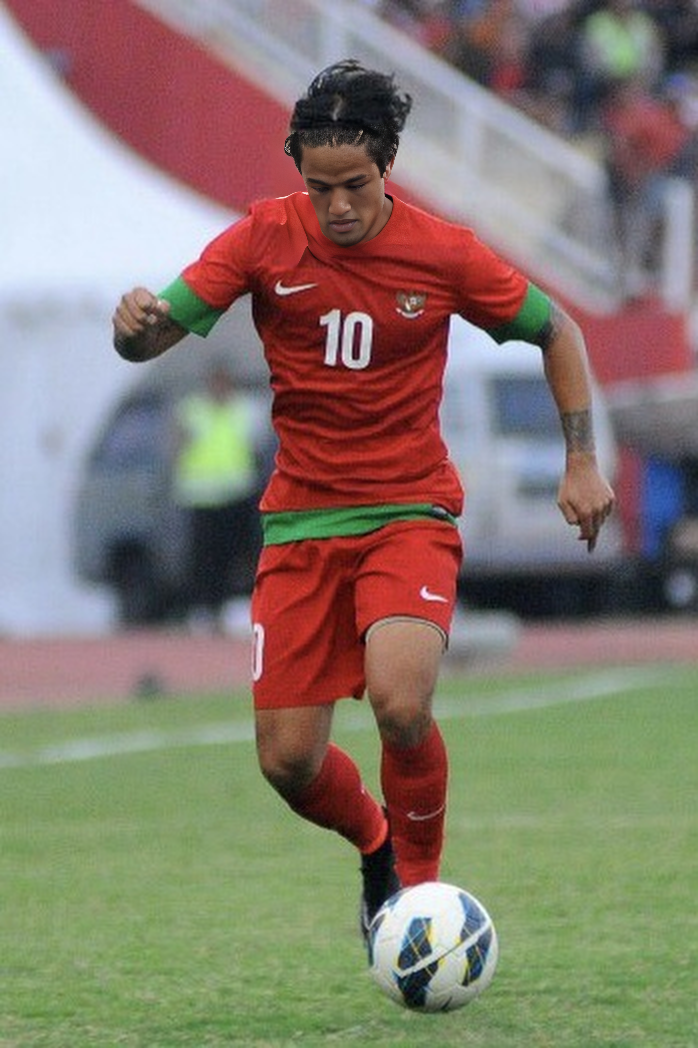
Irfan Bachdim made 41 appearances and scored 12 goals for Indonesia after choosing to become an Indonesian citizen at the age of 17

Elkan Baggott made 24 appearances for the national team after choosing to become an Indonesian citizen at the age of 17

The following players have chosen to represent Indonesia men's national team with this already being their primary nationality or gain their Indonesia citizenship through their parents who hold the latter nationality, although born elsewhere and eligible to represent other countries (i.e. parent's original country, nation of birth, etc.).

No.	Name	Born	Place of birth	Background(s)	National career	Caps	Goals
1	Miro Baldo Bento	1975	(Timor-Leste) Dili (Note: Born in Timor Leste, when it was still part of Portuguese Timor)	East Timor	1998–2000	9	3
2	Irfan Bachdim	1988	(Netherlands) Amsterdam	Netherlands	2010–2019	41	13
3	Elkan Baggott	2002	(Thailand) Bangkok	England; Thailand (Note: Born in Thailand, when his parents (without Thailand ancestry) briefly live there)	2020–	32	3
4	Adrian Wibowo	2006	(United States) Los Angeles	United States	2025–	1	0
5	Mathew Baker	2009	(Australia) Melbourne	Australia	2026–	1	0

=== Stats by country of birth ===
Country	Total
Netherlands	26
Nigeria	3
Australia	2
Brazil	2
Germany	2
United States	2
Argentina	1
Belgium	1
Cameroon	1
East Timor	1
Finland	1
Montenegro	1
Spain	1
Thailand	1
Uruguay	1

=== Indonesian-born with restored Indonesian citizenship ===
Emil Audero moved to Italy during chilhood, decides to represent Indonesia since regained his Indonesia citizenship in 10 March 2025

The following players were born in Indonesia but grew up abroad, having previously held or used another nationality before regained their Indonesian citizenship to represent the national team.

No.	Name	Born	Origin	Nationality regained	National career	Caps	Goals
1	Emil Audero	1997	Italy	10 March 2025	2025–	8	0

== Women ==
=== Naturalized citizens of Indonesia ===
Estella Loupatty were the first naturalized player of Indonesia women's team alongside Noa Leatomu

Noa Leatomu were the first naturalized player of Indonesia women's team alongside Estella Loupatty

Isa Warps has been naturalized as Indonesia citizen since June 2025

The following players were naturalized via the formal process (either through residency or through descent) and went on to play for the Indonesia women's national senior team – Indonesian nationality law does not permit dual citizenship, so all the listed players had to give up their other nationalities.

No.	Name	Born	Place of birth	Origin	Naturalized	National career	Caps	Goals
1	Estella Loupatty	2003	(Netherlands) Amsterdam	Netherlands	8 November 2024	2024–	18	2
2	Emily Nahon	2007	(Netherlands) Oegstgeest	Netherlands	10 June 2025	2025–	17	3
3	Felicia de Zeeuw	2005	(Netherlands) Delft	Netherlands	10 June 2025	2025–	14	1
4	Iris de Rouw	2005	(Netherlands) Rotterdam	Netherlands	10 June 2025	2025–	12	0
5	Isa Warps	2005	(Netherlands) Veldhoven	Netherlands	10 June 2025	2025–	15	2
6	Noa Leatomu	2003	(Netherlands) Roermond	Netherlands	8 November 2024	2025–	2	0
7	Isabelle Nottet	2003	(Netherlands) Uithoorn	Netherlands	29 August 2025	2025–	7	1
8	Isabel Kopp	2002	(Netherlands) Amsterdam	Netherlands	29 August 2025	2025–	2	0
9	Pauline van de Pol	2003	(Netherlands) Haarlem	Netherlands	29 August 2025	2026–	6	0

=== Existing Indonesian nationality ===
The following players have chosen to represent Indonesia women's national senior team with this already being their primary nationality, although born elsewhere and eligible to represent other countries (i.e. parent's original country, nation of birth, etc.).

No.	Name	Born	Place of birth	Background(s)	National career	Caps	Goals
1	Kayla Ristianto	2005	(United States) Lakewood	United States	2024–	1	0
2	Sydney Hopper	2007	(United States) Bentonville	United States	2024–	12	2
3	Katarina Stalin	2009	(United States) Katy	Sweden; United States	2024–	11	0

=== Stats by country of birth ===
Country	Total
Netherlands	9
United States	3

== See also ==
- List of Indonesia international footballers
- List of Malaysia international footballers born outside Malaysia
- List of Singapore international footballers born outside Singapore
- List of Philippines international footballers born outside the Philippines
- List of Thailand international footballers born outside Thailand
- List of Vietnam international footballers born outside Vietnam
