= Kayla Ristianto =

Indonesian footballer (born 2007)

Personal information
- Full name: Kayla Nafiza Ristianto
- Date of birth: 18 February 2005 (age 21)
- Place of birth: Lakewood, Ohio, U.S.
- Height: 1.63 m (5 ft 4 in)
- Position: Midfielder

Team information
- Current team: Cornell Big Red
- Number: 26

Youth career
- –2023: FC Dallas

College career
Years	Team	Apps	(Gls)
2023–	Cornell Big Red	21	(0)

International career^{‡}
2024–	Indonesia	1	(0)
- ‡ National team caps and goals as of 14 July 2024

Kayla Nafiza Ristianto (born February 18, 2005) is a footballer who plays as a midfielder for Cornell Big Red of the National Collegiate Athletic Association (NCAA) Division I. Born in the United States, she represents Indonesia at international level.

== Career statistics ==
=== International ===
As of match played 14 July 2024

Appearances and goals by national team and year
National team	Year	Apps	Goals
Indonesia	2024	1	0
Total		1	0

== See also ==
- List of Indonesia international footballers born outside Indonesia
