= Noa Leatomu =

Indonesian footballer (born 2003)

- Leatomu with Indonesia in 2025

Personal information
- Full name: Noa Johanna Christina Cornelia Leatomu
- Date of birth: 7 November 2003 (age 22)
- Place of birth: Roermond, Netherlands
- Height: 1.70 m (5 ft 7 in)
- Positions: Wing-back; winger

Team information
- Current team: Vc Moldavo

Youth career
- 2013: SVC 2000
- 2017–2019: Alemannia Aachen
- 2019–2020: FC Eindhoven
- 2020–2022: Fortuna Sittard

Senior career*
Years	Team	Apps	(Gls)
2022–2023	Jong Fortuna Sittard		
2023–2024	Genk B		
2024–2025	Alemannia Aachen		
2025–2026	VfR Warbeyen		
2026–	Borussia Mönchengladbach		

International career^{‡}
2025–	Indonesia	2	(0)
- * Club domestic league appearances and goals ‡ National team caps and goals as of 12 August 2025

Noa Johanna Christina Cornelia Leatomu (born 7 November 2003) is a professional footballer who plays as a wing-back or winger for 2. Frauen-Bundesliga club Borussia Mönchengladbach. Born in the Netherlands, she plays Indonesia for the Indonesia national team.

== Early life and background ==
Leatomu was born in Roermond, Netherlands. She is of Indonesian descent, with her Indonesian heritage coming from her father, who is from Maluku. Growing up in the Netherlands, she was surrounded by a large Indonesian family and learned the language through her father. Noa showed an early interest in various sports, including athletics, badminton, and tennis, before focusing primarily on football.

== Club career ==
Leatomu began her football journey in 2013, playing for local amateur club, SVC 2000.

She later moved to Germany to join Alemannia Aachen, a second-division club, where she developed her skills for two years. After returning to the Netherlands, she joined the youth team of FC Eindhoven, followed by Fortuna Sittard, where she continues her career.

Noa also briefly played with Genk B in Belgium from the 2023–24 season. In the 2024–25 season, she returned to Alemannia Aachen.

== International career ==
Leatomu has opted to represents the Indonesia women's national team. On 23 October 2024, she made her unofficial debut in a friendly match against ADO Den Haag.

== Personal life ==
Leatomu was born to a Dutch mother and an Indonesian father of Maluku descent. Her paternal grandmother, Paulina Johanna Ferdinandus, was born in Tanah Merah, Papua, Indonesia. Leatomu's family heritage has deeply influenced her connection to Indonesia, and she learned the Indonesian language from her father.

On 8 November 2024, alongside Estella Loupatty, Leatomu obtained Indonesian citizenship, making them the first naturalized female players for the Indonesia women's team.

Leatomu obtained Bachelor of Science in Biomedical sciences in the Maastricht University.

== Honours ==
Indonesia

- AFF Women's Cup: 2024

== See also ==
- List of Indonesia international footballers born outside Indonesia
