= Tonnie Cusell =

Indonesian former footballer

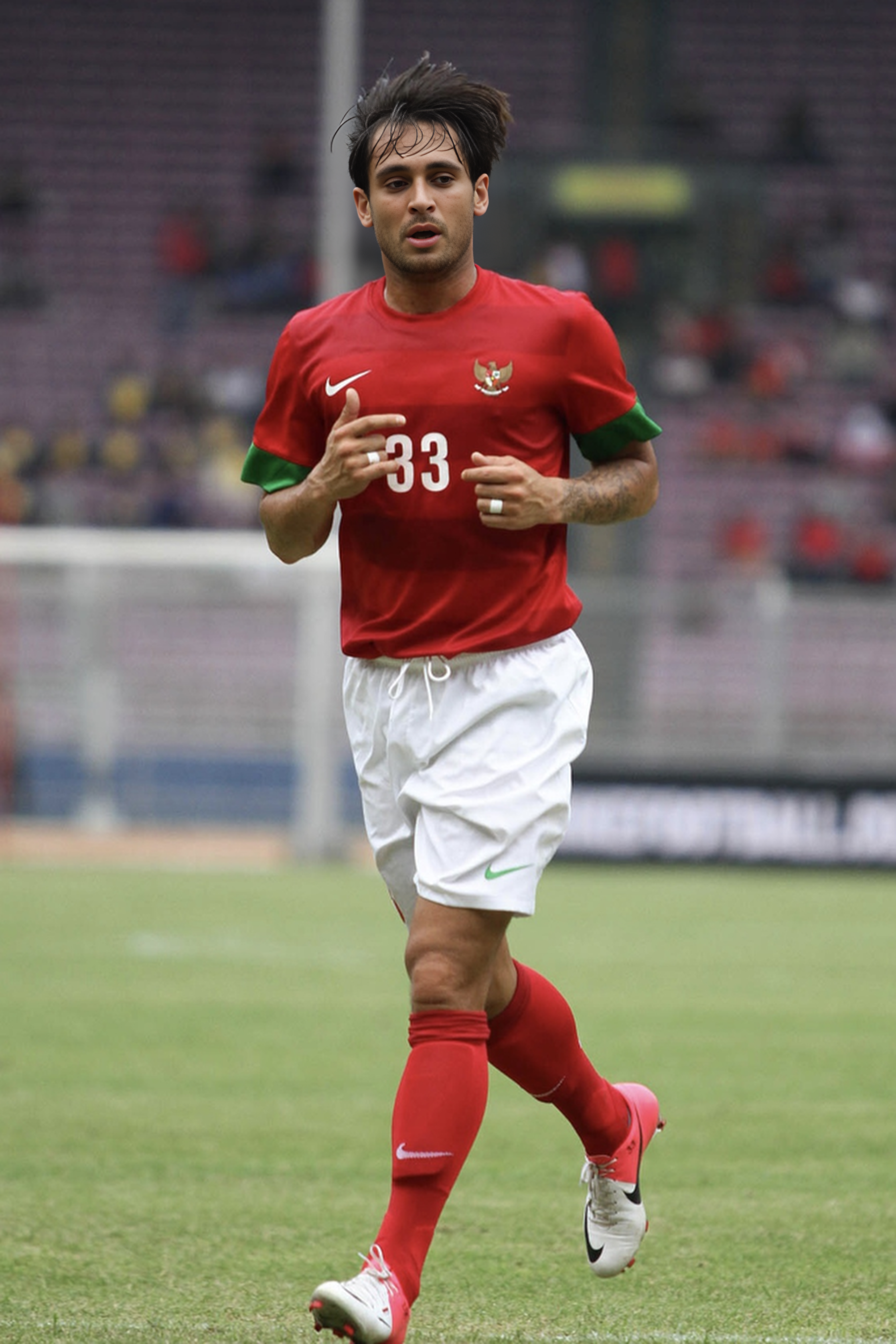
- Cusell playing for Indonesia in 2012

Personal information
- Full name: Tonnie Harry Cusell Lilipaly
- Date of birth: 4 February 1983 (age 43)
- Place of birth: Amsterdam, Netherlands
- Height: 5 ft 9 in (1.75 m)
- Position: Midfielder

Youth career
- 1997: Abcoude
- 1998: Haarlem
- 1999: DWS
- 1999–2000: Vitesse
- 2000–2002: Twente
- 2002–2003: Volendam

Senior career*
Years	Team	Apps	(Gls)
2003–2004	Cannes	22	(2)
2004	AGT Amsterdam	8	(0)
2004–2005	ADO '20	19	(0)
2005–2006	DWV	12	(0)
2006–2007	RKC Waalwijk II	27	(0)
2007–2008	AFC	28	(0)
2008–2009	NVC Naarden	21	(0)
2009–2011	Hilversum	21	(2)
2011–2013	GVVV	35	(6)
2013–2014	Ajax Amateurs	14	(2)
2014	Barito Putera	5	(0)
2014–2015	Nieuw Utrecht	13	(0)
2015–2016	Ajax Amateurs	11	(0)
Total		236	(12)

International career
2012	Indonesia	3	(0)
- * Club domestic league appearances and goals

Tonnie Harry Cusell Lilipaly (born 4 February 1983) is a retired footballer who played as a midfielder. Born in the Netherlands, he represented Indonesia at international level.

== Club career ==
Cusell played for 18 clubs in 25 years time, primarily in Dutch football. In 2013 he left Topklasse club GVVV for Ajax, only to leave them for a stint with Indonesian side Barito Putera.

He finished his career in June 2016 after another season at Ajax Amateurs.

== International career ==
On 14 November 2012, Cusell made his international debut for the Indonesia national team in a friendly match against Timor Leste. Cusell also played in the friendly against Cameroon on 17 November 2012 in a 0–0 draw.

Cusell made his official international debut on 25 November 2012, in 2012 AFF Suzuki Cup against Laos. He retired from the national team in 2014.

== Personal life ==
His cousin Stefano Lilipaly is also a footballer.

== See also ==
- List of Indonesia international footballers born outside Indonesia
