= Jude Soonsup-Bell =

Thai footballer (born 2004)

Personal information
- Full name: Jude Jacob Soonsup-Bell
- Date of birth: 10 January 2004 (age 22)
- Place of birth: Chippenham, England
- Height: 1.86 m (6 ft 1 in)
- Position: Striker

Team information
- Current team: Port
- Number: 18

Youth career
- Calne Town
- Swindon Town
- 2016–2021: Chelsea

Senior career*
Years	Team	Apps	(Gls)
2021–2023	Chelsea	0	(0)
2023–2024	Tottenham Hotspur	0	(0)
2024–2025	Córdoba	7	(0)
2025	→ Sanluqueño (loan)	13	(1)
2025–2026	Grimsby Town	24	(1)
2026–	Port	5	(0)

International career^{‡}
2019	England U15	4	(1)
2019–2020	England U16	7	(6)
2021	England U18	5	(2)
2021	England U19	2	(1)
2025–	Thailand	9	(3)
Medal record
Men's football
Representing Thailand
FIFA ASEAN Cup
Runner-up	2026 Indonesia	Team
- * Club domestic league appearances and goals as of 15:52, 28 July 2026 (UTC) ‡ National team caps and goals as of 5 October 2026

Jude Jacob Soonsup-Bell (Thai: จู๊ด ซุ่นทรัพย์-เบลล์; RTGS: Chut Sunsap-Ben; born 10 January 2004) is a professional footballer who plays as a striker for Thai League 1 club Port. Born in England, he plays for the Thailand national team.

== Early life ==
Born in Chippenham, Soonsup-Bell started his career at local side Calne Town, before joining Swindon Town. He moved to Chelsea at under-13 level.

== Club career ==
=== Chelsea ===
Initially a midfielder, Soonsup-Bell was converted into a forward in the Chelsea academy. This change was beneficial for both Chelsea and Soonsup-Bell, as he progressed into a prolific striker, notably scoring four goals in an 8–1 FA Youth Cup win over Barnsley - the first Chelsea player to score four goals in this competition since Roger Bill in 1961.

At the age of 16, he was playing regularly for Chelsea's under-23 squad, and was seen as one of Chelsea's best young players. He signed his first professional contract in January 2021, having trained with the first team in preparation for their FA Cup third round tie with Morecambe.

Soonsup-Bell made his Chelsea debut on 22 December 2021 in the quarterfinals of the EFL Cup, starting in a 2–0 win against Brentford.

=== Tottenham Hotspur ===
On 30 January 2023, it was confirmed that Soonsup-Bell had signed a contract with Tottenham Hotspur.

=== Córdoba ===
On 22 August 2024, following a successful season in Premier League 2, Soonsup-Bell joined Segunda División club Córdoba. On 30 October, he scored his first senior goal, his only goal for the club, in a Copa del Rey tie against fourth tier side UE Olot. The match finished 1-1, and Córdoba went on to lose the penalty shootout 4-3 following misses from forwards Ander Yoldi and Antonio Casas.

On 3 February 2025, Soonsup-Bell was loaned to Atlético Sanluqueño in the third tier until the end of the season. On 30 March, he scored his first goal for the club, his only goal in Spanish league football, in a 4–2 victory over Antequera CF. On 25 July, he terminated his contract with Córdoba.

=== Grimsby Town ===
On 11 August 2025, Soonsup-Bell joined Grimsby Town on a one-year deal, with an option for a further year. He scored his only goal for the club in a 3-1 victory over Salford City. After making 24 League and 5 Cup appearances, he was released at the conclusion of the 2025–26 season.

=== Port ===
On 26 July 2026, Soonsup-Bell joined Thai League 1 club Port on a four-year deal.

== International career ==
Soonsup-Bell is of Thai and English descent through his mother, and English and Irish descent through his father. He has played for England at under-15, under-16, under-18 and under-19 level. He is the second highest goal-scorer for the England U16s, behind Jadon Sancho, with six goals in seven appearances.

In November 2025, Soonsup-Bell officially accepted a call-up to the Thailand national team. On 6 November 2025, his request to switch international allegiance to Thailand was approved by FIFA. Soonsup-Bell made his debut for Thailand in a friendly match against Singapore on 13 November 2025, in which he missed a penalty at the end of the game. Soonsup-Bell scored his first international goals with a brace on 18 November against Sri Lanka during the 2027 AFC Asian Cup qualification at the Colombo Racecourse.

Soonsup-Bell is of Thai descent through his mother. His maternal family has a long history of public service in Thailand; he is the grandson of Roongsak Soonsup and the great-grandson of Lieutenant Boonluen Soonsup (Thai: เรือเอก บุญเลื่อน ซุ่นทรัพย์), a former Director-General of the Marine Department. The "Boonluen Soonsup Building" (Thai: อาคารบุญเลื่อน ซุ่นทรัพย์) was dedicated in his great-grandfather's honour to recognise his contributions to the department. Additionally, his grandfather's younger brother, Pol. Lt. Gen. Rungrit Soonsup, served as Assistant Commissioner-General of the Royal Thai Police.

== Career statistics ==
As of match played 2 May 2026

Appearances and goals by club, season and competition
Club	Season	League			National cup (Note: Includes Copa del Rey, FA Cup)		League cup (Note: Includes EFL Cup)		Other		Total	
Club	Season	Division	Apps	Goals	Apps	Goals	Apps	Goals	Apps	Goals	Apps	Goals
Chelsea U21	2021–22	—			—		—		3 (Note: Appearances in EFL Trophy)	0	3	0
Chelsea U21	2022–23	—			—		—		2	0	2	0
Chelsea U21	Total		0	0	0	0	0	0	5	0	5	0
Chelsea	2021–22	Premier League	0	0	0	0	1	0	0	0	1	0
Tottenham Hotspur	2022–23	Premier League	0	0	0	0	0	0	0	0	0	0
Córdoba	2024–25	Segunda División	7	0	1	1	—		0	0	8	1
Atlético Sanluqueño (loan)	2024–25	Primera Federación	13	1	0	0	—		0	0	13	1
Grimsby Town	2025–26	EFL League Two	24	1	2	0	0	0	3	0	29	1
Career total			44	2	3	1	1	0	8	0	56	3

=== International goals ===
#	Date	Venue	Opponent	Score	Result	Competition
1.	18 November 2025	Colombo Racecourse, Colombo, Sri Lanka	Sri Lanka	2–0	4–0	2027 AFC Asian Cup qualification
2.	18 November 2025	Colombo Racecourse, Colombo, Sri Lanka	Sri Lanka	4–0	4–0	2027 AFC Asian Cup qualification
3.	26 September 2026	Si Jalak Harupat Stadium, Bandung, Indonesia	Pakistan	2–0	4–0	2026 FIFA ASEAN Cup

== Honours ==
Thailand

- FIFA ASEAN Cup runner-up: 2026

== See also ==
- List of Thailand international footballers born outside Thailand
