= List of Thailand international footballers born outside Thailand =

This is the list of Thailand international footballers who are either naturalised or born outside the country before choosing to represent Thailand national football team.

== List of players ==
The following players:

1. have played at least one game for the full (senior male) Thailand international team; and
2. were born outside Thailand.

Player	Born	Origin	First cap	Last cap	Notes
Jamie Waite	1986	(England) Plymouth	2002	2002	
Peter Läng	1986	(Switzerland) Zürich	2009	2009	
Anthony Ampaipitakwong	1988	(United States) Texas	2013	2013	
Charyl Chappuis	1992	(Switzerland) Locarno	2014	2017	
Tristan Do	1993	(France) Paris	2015	2023	
Philip Roller	1994	(Germany) Munich	2017	2022	
Mika Chunuonsee	1989	(Wales) Bridgend	2016	2019	
Kevin Deeromram	1997	(Sweden) Stockholm	2017	2025	
Manuel Bihr	1994	(Germany) Herrenberg	2017	TBD	
Elias Dolah	1993	(Sweden) Lund	2019	TBD	
Ernesto Amantegui	1990	(Spain) Oviedo	2021	2021	
Chakkit Laptrakul	1994	(France) Fleury-Mérogis	2023	TBD	
Athit Berg	1998	(Norway) Oslo	2023	TBD	
Nicholas Mickelson	1999	(Norway) Skien	2023	TBD	
James Beresford	2002	(England) Worthing	2023	TBD	
Patrik Gustavsson	2001	(Sweden) Åtvidaberg	2024	TBD	
William Weidersjö	2001	(Sweden) Älvsjö	2024	TBD	
Marco Ballini	1998	(Italy) Bologna	2025	TBD	
Jude Soonsup-Bell	2004	(England) Chippenham	2025	TBD	
Erawan Garnier	2006	(France) Ecully	2026	TBD	
