= 2024–25 Córdoba CF season =

Córdoba CF
2024–25 season
- CEO: Antonio Fernández Monterrubio
- Head coach: Iván Ania
- Stadium: Estadio Nuevo Arcángel
- Segunda División: Pre-season
- Copa del Rey: Pre-season
- Average home league attendance: 15,804
Home colours	Away colours	Third colours

The 2024–25 season is the 71st season in the history of the Córdoba CF, and the club's first season back in the Segunda División since 2019. In addition to the domestic league, the team is scheduled to participate in the Copa del Rey.

== Summary ==
Due to the successful promotion from the Primera Federation, coach Iván Ania's contract was automatically renewed. On 13 July, Cordoba announced that their midfielder captain, Kike Márquez, is leaving with one year left on his contract.

== Transfers ==
=== In ===
Pos.	Player	Transferred from	Fee	Date	Source
MF	(Spain) Cristian Delgado	(Spain) CD Numancia	Loan return	30 June 2024	
MF	(Spain) Álex Sala	(Spain) Girona FC	Free	2 July 2024	
MF	(Spain) Xavi Sintes	(Spain) Sevilla Atlético	Free	3 July 2024	
FW	(Russia) Nikolay Obolskiy	(Spain) UD Ibiza	Free	4 July 2024	
GK	(Spain) Ramón Vila	(Spain) Atlético Baleares		5 July 2024	
MF	(France) Théo Zidane	(Spain) Real Madrid Castilla	Free	11 July 2024	
FW	(Spain) Jacobo González	(Spain) Alcorcón	Free	16 July 2024	

=== Out ===
Pos.	Player	Transferred to	Fee	Date	Source
DF	(Spain) Carlos García	(Spain) Cadiz CF	Loan return	30 June 2024	
FW	(Spain) Álvaro Leiva	(Spain) Real Madrid Castilla	Loan return	30 June 2024	
FW	(Spain) Alberto Toril	(Costa Rica) Alajuelense	End of contract	1 July 2024	
MF	(Morocco) Simo Bouzaidi	(Spain) CD Eldense	End of contract	1 July 2024	
MF	(Mali) Youssouf Diarra	(Spain) CD Tenerife	End of contract	1 July 2024	
MF	(Spain) Recio		End of contract	1 July 2024	
DF	(Spain) Iván Rodríguez		End of contract	1 July 2024	
MF	(Spain) Cristian Delgado	(Spain) CD Numancia	End of contract	1 July 2024	
GK	(Spain) Lluis Tarrés			1 July 2024	
MF	(Spain) Kike Márquez		Contract termination	13 July 2024	

== Friendlies ==
=== Pre-season ===
On July 13, Córdoba invited first division club Rayo Vallecano from the Madrid region to compete for the II Puertas de Córdoba Trophy. Córdoba's pre-season began on 15 July. The Blanquiverdes will hold a pre-season camp in Montecastillo from 5 to 10 August.

31 July 2024 Trofeo Puertas de Córdoba	Córdoba	v	Rayo Vallecano	Córdoba
21:00				Stadium: Estadio Nuevo Arcángel

6 August 2024 Trofeo Colombino	Recreativo de Huelva	v	Córdoba	Huelva
				Stadium: Estadio Nuevo Colombino

== Competitions ==
=== Overall record ===
Competition	First match	Last match	Starting round	Record							
Competition	First match	Last match	Starting round	Pld	W	D	L	GF	GA	GD	Win %
Segunda División	16 August 2024	1 June 2025	Matchday 1	7	2	2	3	9	11	−2	28.57
Copa del Rey				0	0	0	0	0	0	+0	—
Total				7	2	2	3	9	11	−2	28.57

Last updated: 29 September 2024
Source: [ Soccerway]

=== Segunda División ===
==== League table ====
Pos	Team	Pld	W	D	L	GF	GA	GD	Pts
12	Burgos	42	15	10	17	41	48	−7	55 (Note: Burgos finished ahead of Cádiz and Córdoba on head-to-head points: Burgos 6 pts, Cádiz 5 pts, Córdoba 4 pts.)
13	Cádiz	42	14	13	15	55	53	+2	55
14	Córdoba	42	14	13	15	59	63	−4	55
15	Deportivo La Coruña	42	13	14	15	56	54	+2	53 (Note: Deportivo La Coruña finished ahead of Málaga and Castellón on head-to-head points: Deportivo La Coruña 6 pts, Málaga 5 pts, Castellón 4 pts.)
16	Málaga	42	12	17	13	42	46	−4	53

Source: LaLiga Hypermotion
Rules for classification: 1) Points; 2) Head-to-head points; 3) Head-to-head goal difference; 4) Goal difference; 5) Goals scored; 6) Fair-play points
(Note: Head-to-head record is used only after all the matches between the teams in question have been played)

==== Results summary ====
Overall								Home						Away					
Pld	W	D	L	GF	GA	GD	Pts	W	D	L	GF	GA	GD	W	D	L	GF	GA	GD
1	0	0	1	0	1	−1	0	0	0	0	0	0	0	0	0	1	0	1	−1

Last updated: 16 August 2024.

==== Results by round ====
Round	1
Ground	A
Result	L
Position	

Updated to match(es) played on 16 August 2024. Source:
A = Away; H = Home; W = Win; D = Draw; L = Loss

==== Matches ====
The match schedule was released on 26 June 2024.

16 August 2024 1	Mirandés	1–0	Córdoba	Miranda de Ebro
19:00	Reina 25'			Stadium: Anduva; Referee: Miguel González Díaz

26 August 2024 2	Córdoba	2–2	Burgos	Córdoba
21:30				Stadium: Estadio Nuevo Arcángel

2 September 2024 3	Elche	3–1	Córdoba	Elche
21:30				Stadium: Estadio Martínez Valero

7 September 2024 4	Córdoba	0–0	Málaga	Córdoba
21:00				Stadium: Estadio Nuevo Arcángel

13 September 2024 5	Córdoba	2–0	Deportivo La Coruña	Córdoba
20:30				Stadium: Estadio Nuevo Arcángel

23 September 2024 6	Huesca	4–1	Córdoba	Huesca
20:30				Stadium: Estadio El Alcoraz

29 September 2024 7	Córdoba	3–1	Racing Ferrol	Córdoba
18:30	Ruiz 43'; Casas 71'; Lapeña 84'		Jauregi 47'	Stadium: Estadio Nuevo Arcángel

6 October 2024 8	Albacete	1–1	Córdoba	Albacete

13 October 2024 9	Granada	1–0	Córdoba	Granada

18 October 2024 10	Córdoba	2–1	Cartagena	Córdoba

23 October 2024 11	Racing Santander	2–0	Córdoba	Santander

26 October 2024 12	Córdoba	2–0	Eldense	Córdoba

10 November 2024 14	Córdoba	2–2	Castellón	Córdoba

17 November 2024 15	Cádiz	2–0	Córdoba	Cádiz

23 November 2024 16	Córdoba	2–2	Zaragoza	Córdoba

26 November 2024 13	Almería	4–0	Córdoba	Almería

1 December 2024 17	Sporting Gijón	2–0	Córdoba	Gijón

8 December 2024 18	Córdoba	3–0	Tenerife	Córdoba

14 December 2024 19	Levante	2–2	Córdoba	Valencia

17 December 2024 20	Córdoba	2–1	Eibar	Córdoba

21 December 2024 21	Oviedo	2–3	Córdoba	Oviedo

12 January 2025 22	Córdoba	0–3	Almería	Córdoba

19 January 2025 23	Castellón	1–2	Córdoba	Castellón de la Plana

25 January 2025 24	Córdoba	1–2	Racing Santander	Córdoba

2 February 2025 25	Cartagena	0–1	Córdoba	Cartagena

9 February 2025 26	Córdoba	1–2	Huesca	Córdoba

15 February 2025 27	Tenerife	2–3	Córdoba	Santa Cruz de Tenerife

22 February 2025 28	Racing Ferrol	0–1	Córdoba	Ferrol

2 March 2025 29	Córdoba	5–0	Granada	Córdoba

7 March 2025 30	Deportivo La Coruña	1–1	Córdoba	A Coruña

15 March 2025 31	Córdoba	1–1	Sporting Gijón	Córdoba

24 March 2025 32	Zaragoza	1–1	Córdoba	Zaragoza

30 March 2025 33	Córdoba	1–2	Elche	Córdoba

6 April 2025 34	Málaga	0–1	Córdoba	Málaga

11 April 2025 35	Córdoba	2–2	Levante	Córdoba

20 April 2025 36	Córdoba	0–0	Oviedo	Córdoba

26 April 2025 37	Eldense	v	Córdoba	Elda
16:15
