= Alex Kpakpé =

English footballer (born 2004)

Personal information
- Full name: Alex Colin Kpakpé
- Date of birth: 22 February 2004 (age 22)
- Place of birth: Hackney, England
- Position: Left-back

Team information
- Current team: Lingfield

Youth career
- 2018–2022: Chelsea

Senior career*
Years	Team	Apps	(Gls)
2023	Rangers B	4	(0)
2024	Hitchin Town	15	(0)
2024–2025	Aveley	12	(0)
2024	→ Wingate & Finchley (dual-registration)	3	(0)
2025	→ Hastings United (dual-registration)	14	(0)
2025	Cray Valley Paper Mills	7	(0)
2025–2026	Lewes	23	(1)
2026–	Lingfield	10	(1)
- * Club domestic league appearances and goals as of 15:56, 14 October 2026 (UTC)

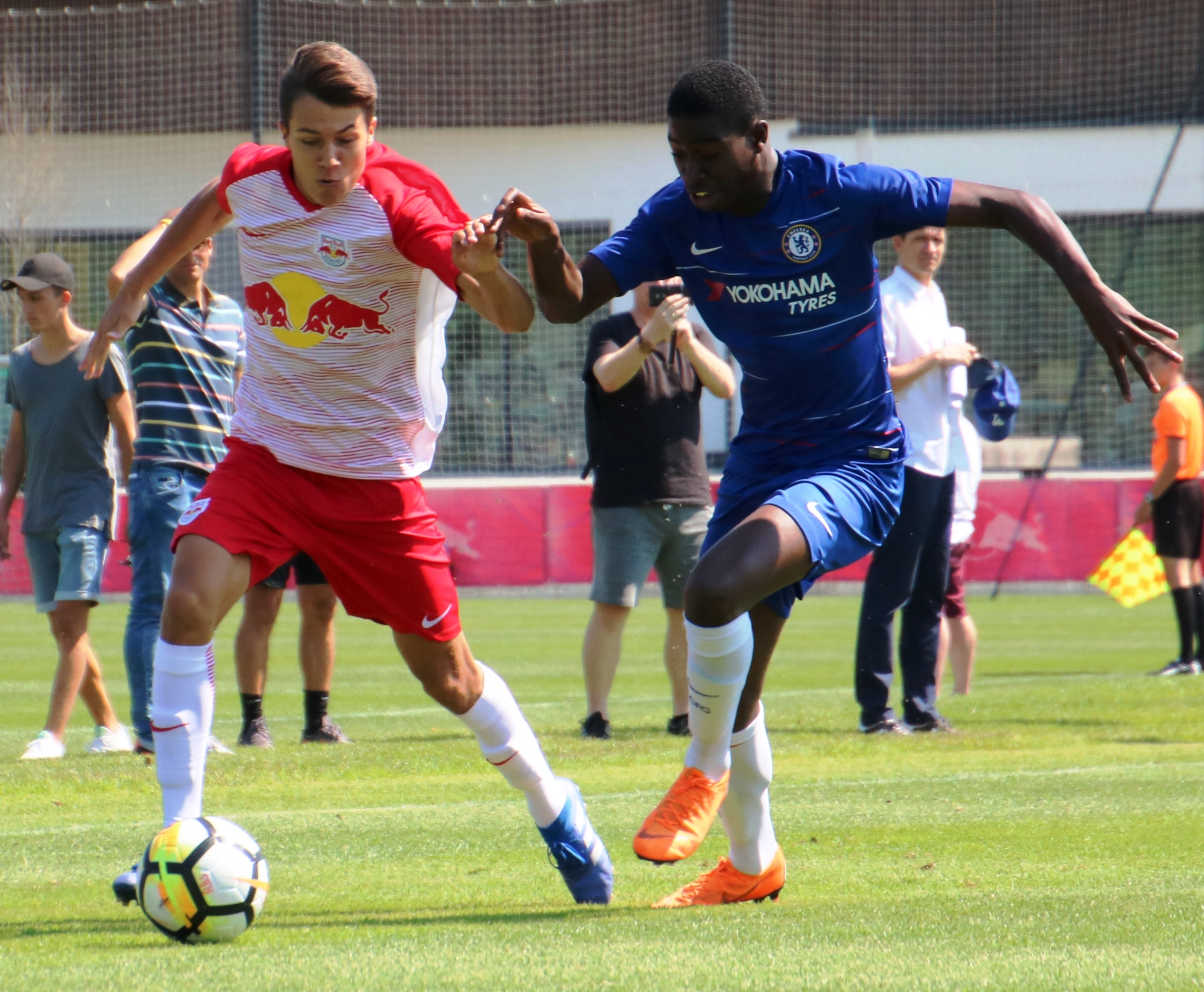
Alex Kpakpé (right)

Alex Colin Kpakpé (born 22 February 2004) is an English professional footballer who plays as a left-back for Southern Combination Premier Division club Lingfield.

== Club career ==
Born in Hackney, Kpakpé first took an interest in football at the age of five, playing in his garden with his cousins. He played grassroots football in Tulse Hill, before joining the academy of Chelsea at under-14 level. During his youth, he also played handball, and was a 100 metres sprinter. Initially a defensive midfielder, Kpakpé transitioned to a left-back during his time with Chelsea. He signed his first professional contract in February 2021.

His time with the Blues was hampered by injury and illness, and after four years in West London, he left the club in November 2022. The following month, he played in a bounce match with Scottish side Rangers. He signed a six-month deal with Rangers in January 2023.

On 14 January 2023, he made his debut for Rangers B in the Lowland League, coming on as a substitute for Mackenzie Strachan in a 6–1 win over Dalbeattie Star. Following his release by Rangers B in July 2023, Kpakpé signed with Southern League Premier side Hitchin Town.

On 31 August 2024, Kpakpé joined National League South side Aveley. In December 2024, he signed dual-registration terms with Isthmian League Premier Division side Wingate & Finchley.

In August 2025, Kpakpé joined Isthmian League Premier Division club Cray Valley Paper Mills. In December 2025, he joined divisional rivals Lewes.

In July 2026, Kpakpé joined Southern Combination Premier Division club Lingfield.

== Personal life ==
Kpakpé's cousins are Fulham winger Ryan Sessegnon and Wigan Athletic right-back Steven Sessegnon; both of whom have represented England at youth international level.

He is of Haitian and Ivorian descent.

== Career statistics ==
=== Club ===
As of 11 May 2023.

Club	Season	League			Cup		Other		Total	
Club	Season	Division	Apps	Goals	Apps	Goals	Apps	Goals	Apps	Goals
Rangers B	2022–23	Lowland League	4	0	–		0	0	4	0
Career total			4	0	0	0	0	0	4	0
