= Indonesia women's national football team results (2020–present) =

Indonesia women's national football team results

This article provides details of international football games played by the Indonesia women's national football team from 2020 to present.

== 2020–present ==
Key
Win
Draw
Defeat

=== 2021 ===
24 September 2021 Women's Asian Cup qualifiers	Singapore	0–1	Indonesia	Dushanbe, Tajikistan
18:00 UTC+5		Report (AFC); Report (PSSI)	Baiq 4'	Stadium: Pamir Stadium; Attendance: 0 Referee: Lee Yi-chi (Chinese Taipei)

27 September 2021 Women's Asian Cup qualifiers	Indonesia	1–0	Singapore	Dushanbe, Tajikistan
18:00 UTC+5	Octavianti 30'	Report (AFC); Report (PSSI)		Stadium: Pamir Stadium; Attendance: 0 Referee: Choki Om (Bhutan)

=== 2022 ===
21 January 2022 Women's Asian Cup	Australia	18–0	Indonesia	Mumbai, India
15:30 UTC+5:30	Kerr 9', 11', 26' (pen.), 36', 54'; Foord 14'; Fowler 17'; Raso 24', 88'; Carpenter 34', 49'; Van Egmond 39' (pen.), 57', 58', 69'; Simon 67', 71'; Luik 78'	Report (FIFA); Report (AFC)		Stadium: Mumbai Football Arena; Attendance: 0 Referee: Mahsa Ghorbani (Iran)

24 January 2022 Women's Asian Cup	Indonesia	0–4	Thailand	Navi Mumbai, India
17:30 UTC+5:30		Report (FIFA); Report (AFC)	Chetthabutr 27', 36', 71'; Makris 76'	Stadium: DY Patil Stadium; Attendance: 0 Referee: Yoshimi Yamashita (Japan)

27 January 2022 Women's Asian Cup	Philippines	6–0	Indonesia	Pune, India
19:30 UTC+5:30	Guillou 6'; Bolden 27'; Annis 56', 82'; Miclat 74'; Cesar 90+4'	Report (FIFA); Report (AFC)		Stadium: Shiv Chhatrapati Sports Complex; Attendance: 0 Referee: Kim Yu-jeong (South Korea)

9 May 2022 Southeast Asian Games	Vietnam	Cancelled	Indonesia	Quảng Ninh, Vietnam
--:-- UTC+7				Stadium: Cẩm Phả Stadium

11 May 2022 Southeast Asian Games	Cambodia	Cancelled	Indonesia	Quảng Ninh, Vietnam
--:-- UTC+7				Stadium: Cẩm Phả Stadium

14 May 2022 Southeast Asian Games	Indonesia	Cancelled	Philippines	Quảng Ninh, Vietnam
--:-- UTC+7		Report		Stadium: Cẩm Phả Stadium

4 July 2022 AFF Women's Championship	Indonesia	0–4	Thailand	Biñan, Philippines
19:00 UTC+8		Report	Alisa 3', 88'; Tipkritta 10'; Sawang 69'	Stadium: Biñan Football Stadium; Attendance: 0 Referee: Công Thị Dung (Vietnam)

6 July 2022 AFF Women's Championship	Indonesia	1–1	Malaysia	Biñan, Philippines
19:00 UTC+8	Sheva 74'	Report	Steffi 90+2'	Stadium: Biñan Football Stadium; Referee: Plong Pichakara (Cambodia)

8 July 2022 AFF Women's Championship	Australia U23	4–0	Indonesia	Manila, Philippines
16:00 UTC+8	Sayer 9', 13', 15', 44'	Report		Stadium: Rizal Memorial Stadium; Referee: Aung Seinn Cho (Myanmar)

10 July 2022 AFF Women's Championship	Philippines	4–1	Indonesia	Manila, Philippines
19:00 UTC+8	Annis 48'; Bolden 58', 65', 67'	Report	Carla 38'	Stadium: Rizal Memorial Stadium; Attendance: 1,464; Referee: Bùi Thị Thu Trang (Vietnam)

12 July 2022 AFF Women's Championship	Indonesia	0–2	Singapore	Biñan, Philippines
19:00 UTC+8		Report	Izzati 45+3'; Syazwani 90+2'	Stadium: Biñan Football Stadium; Attendance: 58; Referee: Bùi Thị Thu Trang (Vietnam)

10 October 2022 Friendly	Singapore	1–2	Indonesia	Jalan Besar, Singapore
20:00 UTC+8	Nur Farhanah 86'	Report	Marsela 51'; Helsya 90+2'	Stadium: Jalan Besar Stadium; Attendance: 986

=== 2023 ===
22 February 2023 Friendly	Saudi Arabia	1–1	Indonesia	Dammam, Saudi Arabia
18:00 UTC+3	Abdulrazak 85'	Report	Baiq 8'	Stadium: Prince Mohamed bin Fahd Stadium; Referee: Veronika Bernatskaia (Kyrgyzstan)

26 February 2023 Friendly	Saudi Arabia	0–1	Indonesia	Dammam, Saudi Arabia
18:00 UTC+3		Report	Baiq 18'	Stadium: Prince Mohamed bin Fahd Stadium; Referee: Veronika Bernatskaia (Kyrgyzstan)

8 April 2023 2024 AFC Women's Olympic qualification	Indonesia	0–5	Lebanon	Jounieh, Lebanon
14:30 UTC+3		Report	Iskandar 29', 79'; Khoury 45+2'; Bou Rada 59'; Maalouf 69'	Stadium: Fouad Chehab Stadium; Referee: Nguyen Thi Hang Nga (Vietnam)

11 April 2023 2024 AFC Women's Olympic qualification	Chinese Taipei	4–0	Indonesia	Jounieh, Lebanon
14:30 UTC+3	Wang Hsiang-huei 7'; Hsu Yi-yun 35'; Remini 87' (o.g.); Wu Kai-ching 90'	Report		Stadium: Fouad Chehab Stadium; Referee: Veronika Bernatskaya (Kyrgyz Republic)

=== 2024 ===
28 May Friendly	Indonesia	5–1	Singapore	Jakarta, Indonesia
19:00 UTC+7	Awi 11', 66'; Scheunemann 64', 87' (pen.); Reva 90+5'	Report	Chu 20'	Stadium: Gelora Madya Stadium; Attendance: 2,939

8 June Friendly	Bahrain	2–3	Indonesia	Manama, Bahrain
18:45 UTC+3	Sabkar 63'; Al-Ali 78'	Report	Safira 4'; Octavianti 26'; Scheunemann 43'	Stadium: Al Ahli Stadium

11 June Friendly	Indonesia	3–0	Bahrain	Manama, Bahrain
18:30 UTC+3	Scheunemann 57'; Zahra 70'; Citra 90+2'	Report		Stadium: Al Ahli Stadium

11 July Friendly	Hong Kong	3–2	Indonesia	Happy Valley, Hong Kong
18:00 UTC+8	Chung Pui-ki 19'; Chan Wing Sze 54'; Cheung Wai Ki 69'	Report (FIFA)	Citra 24'; Awi 80'	Stadium: Hong Kong Football Club Stadium; Attendance: 0

14 July Friendly	Hong Kong	4–1	Indonesia	Happy Valley, Hong Kong
18:00 UTC+8	Wai Yuen Ting 5'; Mui Meo Ho 25'; Wai Kit Cheung 28', 45+3'	Report (FIFA)	Sheva 63'	Stadium: Hong Kong Football Club Stadium; Attendance: 1,589; Referee: Supiree Testhomya (Thailand)

25 October Friendly	Netherlands	15–0	Indonesia	Doetinchem, Netherlands
20:45 UTC+1	Leuchter 10', 31'; Roord 21', 48'; Spitse 28' (pen.); Hutapea 32' (o.g.); Keukelaar 41', 57'; Egurrola 56'; Nijstad 63', 73'; Jansen 66', 74', 81'; Snoeijs 75'			Stadium: De Vijverberg; Referee: Caroline Lanssens (Belgium)

23 November 2024 AFF Women's Cup GS	Indonesia	0–0	Cambodia	Vientiane, Laos
15:00 UTC+7		Report		Stadium: New Laos National Stadium; Referee: Cha Min-ji (South Korea)

26 November 2024 AFF Women's Cup GS	Malaysia	0–1	Indonesia	Vientiane, Laos
19:30 UTC+7		Report	Scheunemann 79'	Stadium: New Laos National Stadium; Referee: Asaka Koizumi (Japan)

2 December 2024 AFF Women's Cup SF	Singapore	0–3	Indonesia	Vientiane, Laos
19:30 UTC+7		Report	Scheunemann 6'; Reva 45'; Octavianti 90+4'	Stadium: New Laos National Stadium; Referee: Cha Min-ji (South Korea)

5 December 2024 AFF Women's Cup Final	Cambodia	1–3	Indonesia	Vientiane, Laos
19:30 UTC+7	Saody 32'	Report	Reva 24', 57'; Hopper 35'	Stadium: New Laos National Stadium; Referee: Asaka Koizumi (Japan)

=== 2025 ===
20 February Friendly	Saudi Arabia	0–1	Indonesia	Jeddah, Saudi Arabia
19:30 UTC+3			Reva 31' (pen.)	Stadium: King Abdullah Sports City; Referee: Mohammed Al-Manii (Oman)

28 May Women's Tri-Nation Cup	Jordan	1–1	Indonesia	Amman, Jordan
19:00 UTC+3	Farah 45+1'		Remini 33'	Stadium: King Abdullah II Stadium

31 May Women's Tri-Nation Cup	Indonesia	0–0	Bangladesh	Amman, Jordan
19:00 UTC+3				Stadium: King Abdullah II Stadium; Referee: Perissa Nasr (Lebanon)

29 June 2026 AFC Women's Asian Cup qualification	Indonesia	1–0	Kyrgyzstan	Tangerang, Indonesia
20:00 UTC+7	Warps 62'	Report		Stadium: Indomilk Arena; Referee: Casey Reibelt (Australia)

2 July 2026 AFC Women's Asian Cup qualification	Pakistan	2–0	Indonesia	Tangerang, Indonesia
20:00 UTC+7	N. Khan 8'; Hirani 19' (pen.)	Report		Stadium: Indomilk Arena

5 July 2026 AFC Women's Asian Cup qualification	Chinese Taipei	2–1	Indonesia	Tangerang, Indonesia
20:00 UTC+7	Su Yu-hsuan 15'; Liu Yu-chiao 75'	Report	Helsya 48'	Stadium: Indomilk Arena

6 August 2025 ASEAN Women's Championship	Thailand	7–0	Indonesia	Haiphong, Vietnam
16:30 UTC+7	Phomsri 6', 27' (pen.); Casteen 19'; Manowang 40'; Jinantuya 41'; Klinklai 71'; Promthongmee 72'	Report		Stadium: Lạch Tray Stadium; Referee: Razlan Joffri Ali (Malaysia)

9 August 2025 ASEAN Women's Championship	Indonesia	0–7	Vietnam	Haiphong, Vietnam
19:30 UTC+7		Report	Nguyễn Thị Bích Thùy 25'; Hoàng Thị Loan 28'; Phạm Hải Yến 69', 85'; Ngân Thị Vạn Sự 71'; Trần Thị Thu Thảo 81'; Nguyễn Thị Tuyết Dung 89'	Stadium: Lạch Tray Stadium; Referee: Rustam Lutfullin (Uzbekistan)

12 August 2025 ASEAN Women's Championship	Indonesia	1–1	Cambodia	Việt Trì, Vietnam
19:30 UTC+7	Rosdilah 82'	Report	Saody 76'	Stadium: Việt Trì Stadium; Referee: Yu Hong (China)

26 November Friendly	Indonesia	2–1	Nepal	Yogyakarta, Indonesia
19:30 UTC+7	Gea 58'; Aulia 67'	Report	Vivi 20' (o.g.)	Stadium: Maguwoharjo Stadium

29 November Friendly	Indonesia	0–5	Chinese Taipei	Yogyakarta, Indonesia
19:30 UTC+7		Report	Nottet 35' (o.g.); Pu Hsin-hui 42'; Gea 70' (o.g.); Chen Yu-chin 75'; Hsu Yi-yun 87'	Stadium: Maguwoharjo Stadium

4 December 2025 SEA Games	Thailand	8–0	Indonesia	Chonburi, Thailand
18:30 UTC+7	Yumanda 8' (o.g.); Pattaranan 21'; Silawan 27'; Saowalak 44'; Jiraporn 50' (pen.), 52' (pen.), 59'; Panittha 55'	Report		Stadium: Chonburi Stadium; Referee: Azusa Sugino (Japan)

7 December 2025 SEA Games	Singapore	1–3	Indonesia	Chonburi, Thailand
16:00 UTC+7	Ruhaizat 22'	Report	Warps 31'; Scheunemann 62'; Aulia 90+5'	Stadium: IPE Chonburi Stadium; Referee: Esra'a Almbaidin (Jordan)

14 December 2025 SEA Games SF	Vietnam	5–0	Indonesia	Chonburi, Thailand
16:00 UTC+7	Nguyễn Thị Bích Thùy 28' (pen.), 80'; Phạm Hải Yến 49', 58'; Huỳnh Như 86'	Report		Stadium: IPE Chonburi Stadium; Referee: Alesar Baddour (Syria)

17 December 2025 SEA Games 3rd	Thailand	2–0	Indonesia	Chonburi, Thailand
15:30 UTC+7	Pitsamai 17'; Pattaranan 43'	Report		Stadium: IPE Chonburi Stadium; Referee: Gulshoda Saitkulova (Uzbekistan)

=== 2026 ===
12 April 2026 FIFA Series	Indonesia	1–7	DR Congo	Ratchaburi, Thailand
16:00 UTC+7	Scheunemann 7' (pen.)	Report (FIFA)	Kanjinga 23', 59'; Mawete 29', 74'; Kasaj 45+6'; Massombo 52'; Feza 82'	Stadium: Ratchaburi Stadium; Referee: Pansa Chaisanit (Thailand)

15 April 2026 FIFA Series	New Caledonia	2–4	Indonesia	Ratchaburi, Thailand
16:00 UTC+7	Honakoko 61'; Hmae 80'	Report (FIFA)	Nahon 19'; Imut 28', 53'; Scheunemann 59'	Stadium: Ratchaburi Stadium; Referee: Sunita Thongthawin (Thailand)

3 June Friendly	Indonesia	0–2	Singapore	Bandung, Indonesia
19:00 UTC+7			Danelle Tan 10'; Nicole Lim 22'	Stadium: Arcamanik Stadium

9 June Friendly	Indonesia	1–1	Cambodia	Bandung, Indonesia
15:30 UTC+7	Siti 54'	Report	Sapheourn 55'	Stadium: Arcamanik Stadium

10 July 2026 AFF Women's Cup GS	Timor-Leste	0–2	Indonesia	Kuala Lumpur, Malaysia
16:45 UTC+8		Report	Nahon 5'; Loupatty 28'	Stadium: Kuala Lumpur Stadium; Referee: Pansa Chaisanit (Thailand)

16 July 2026 AFF Women's Cup GS	Indonesia	1–1	Cambodia	Shah Alam, Malaysia
16:45 UTC+8	Sheva 40'	Report	Serysitha 47'	Stadium: UiTM Stadium; Referee: Asaka Koizumi (Japan)

19 July 2026 AFF Women's Cup SF	Singapore	0–2	Indonesia	Kuala Lumpur, Malaysia
20:45 UTC+8				Stadium: Kuala Lumpur Stadium

22 July 2026 AFF Women's Cup Final	Laos	0–5	Indonesia	Kuala Lumpur, Malaysia
20:45 UTC+8		Report	Hopper 33'; Nottet 48'; Loupatty 55'; De Zeeuw 68'; Nahon 84'	Stadium: Kuala Lumpur Stadium; Referee: Asaka Koizumi (Japan)
