= 2022 AFC Women's Asian Cup Group B =

Group B was the second of three groups of the 2022 AFC Women's Asian Cup that took place from 21 to 27 February 2022. The group consisted of Australia, Indonesia, the Philippines and Thailand. The top three teams, Australia, the Philippines and Thailand, qualified for the knockout stage. The two teams that advanced are Australia and Philippines. Thailand also made the quarter-finals as they are not comparatively last to the other third-place teams.

== Teams ==
Draw position	Team	Pot	Federation	Method of qualification	Date of qualification	Finals appearance	Last appearance	Previous best performance	FIFA Rankings										
Draw position	Team	Pot	Federation	Method of qualification	Date of qualification	Finals appearance	Last appearance	Previous best performance	FIFA Rankings	B1	Australia	1	AFF	2018 runners-up	28 January 2021	6th	2018	Champions (2010)	11
B2	Thailand (Note: Due to non-compliance with conditions set by the World Anti-Doping Agency (WADA), Thailand and Indonesia were not allowed to be represented by their national flags. The sanctions took effect in October 2021. Thailand is represented by its national team logo while Indonesia is represented by its coat of arms.)	2	AFF	Group H winners	25 September 2021	17th	2018	Champions (1983)	38										
B3	Philippines	3	AFF	Group F winners	24 September 2021	10th	2018	Sixth place (2018)	64										
B4	Indonesia	4	AFF	Group C winners	27 September 2021	5th	1989	Fourth place (1977, 1986)	94										

== Standings ==
Pos	Team	Pld	W	D	L	GF	GA	GD	Pts	Qualification
1	Australia	3	3	0	0	24	1	+23	9	Knockout stage
2	Philippines	3	2	0	1	7	4	+3	6	Knockout stage
3	Thailand	3	1	0	2	5	3	+2	3	Knockout stage
4	Indonesia	3	0	0	3	0	28	−28	0	

Source: AFC
Rules for classification: Group stage tiebreakers

== Matches ==
=== Australia vs Indonesia ===
21 January 2022
15:30

Australia	18–0	Indonesia
Kerr 9', 11', 26' (pen.), 36', 54'; Foord 14'; Fowler 17'; Raso 24', 88'; Carpenter 34', 49'; Van Egmond 39' (pen.), 57', 69'; Yallop 59'; Simon 67', 71'; Luik 78'	Report (FIFA); Report (AFC)

Mumbai Football Arena, Mumbai
Attendance: 0
Referee: Mahsa Ghorbani (Iran)

Australia

Team stats
Australia	Statistic	Indonesia
42	Shots	3
25	Shots on target	1
67%	Possession	33%
438	Passes	232
81%	Pass accuracy	58%
11	Fouls	6
1	Yellow cards	0
0	Red cards	0
13	Offsides	0
15	Corners	1

Indonesia

GK	18	Mackenzie Arnold
RB	21	Ellie Carpenter
CB	14	Alanna Kennedy	(yellow card) 53'
CB	4	Clare Polkinghorne		(substituted off) 46'
LB	7	Steph Catley		(substituted off) 46'
CM	10	Emily van Egmond
CM	6	Clare Wheeler
RW	16	Hayley Raso
AM	11	Mary Fowler		(substituted off) 46'
LW	9	Caitlin Foord		(substituted off) 46'
CF	20	Sam Kerr (c)		(substituted off) 68'
Substitutions:
DF	2	Courtney Nevin		(substituted on) 46'
MF	3	Aivi Luik		(substituted on) 46'
MF	13	Tameka Yallop		(substituted on) 46'
FW	17	Kyah Simon		(substituted on) 46'
FW	22	Holly McNamara		(substituted on) 68'
Manager:
(Sweden) Tony Gustavsson

GK	19	Fani Supriyanto	(substituted off) 46'
RB	6	Pani Oktavianti	(substituted off) 75'
CB	9	Ade Mustikiana (c)
CB	2	Remini Chere
LB	14	Diah Tri Lestari	(substituted off) 26'
DM	17	Vivi Oktavia
CM	20	Viny Silfianus	(substituted off) 26'
CM	15	Helsya Maeisyaroh
RF	11	Baiq Amiatun
CF	12	Zahra Muzdalifah
LF	7	Octavianti Dwi	(substituted off) 46'
Substitutions:
DF	4	Shalika Aurelia	(substituted on) 26'
MF	10	Rani Mulyasari	(substituted on) 26'
GK	1	Nurhalimah	(substituted on) 46'
FW	16	Carla Bio	(substituted on) 46'
DF	3	Rosdilah Nurrohmah	(substituted on) 75'
Manager:
Rudy Eka Priyambada

Assistant referees:
Ensieh Khabaz (Iran)
Kristina Sereda (Uzbekistan)
Fourth official:
Oh Hyeon-jeong (South Korea)

=== Thailand vs Philippines ===
21 January 2022
17:30

Thailand	0–1	Philippines
	Report (FIFA); Report (AFC)	C. McDaniel 81'

DY Patil Stadium, Navi Mumbai
Attendance: 0
Referee: Công Thị Dung (Vietnam)

Thailand

Team stats
Thailand	Statistic	Philippines
10	Shots	11
5	Shots on target	4
64%	Possession	36%
513	Passes	299
72%	Pass accuracy	59%
12	Fouls	9
1	Yellow cards	1
0	Red cards	0
2	Offsides	2
8	Corners	0

Philippines

GK	1	Waraporn Boonsing
CB	9	Warunee Phetwiset		(substituted off) 78'
CB	2	Kanjanaporn Saenkhun
CB	4	Phornphirun Philawan
RM	23	Miranda Nild		(substituted off) 85'
CM	8	Nipawan Panyosuk		(substituted off) 78'
CM	15	Orapin Waenngoen
LM	21	Chatchawan Rodthong
AM	7	Silawan Intamee (c)		(substituted off) 67'
AM	12	Nutwadee Pram-nak	(yellow card) 32'
CF	13	Kanyanat Chetthabutr		(substituted off) 67'
Substitutions:
DF	5	Amornrat Utchai		(substituted on) 67'
FW	14	Saowalak Pengngam		(substituted on) 67'
FW	3	Irravadee Makris		(substituted on) 78'
MF	6	Pikul Khueanpet		(substituted on) 78'
FW	17	Taneekarn Dangda		(substituted on) 85'
Manager:
(Japan) Miyo Okamoto

GK	23	Olivia McDaniel
RB	19	Eva Madarang		(substituted off) 46'
CB	5	Hali Long
CB	3	Dominique Randle
LB	16	Sofia Harrison
CM	9	Jessica Miclat		(substituted off) 70'
CM	10	Ryley Bugay
RW	6	Tahnai Annis (c)		(substituted off) 70'
AM	20	Quinley Quezada
LW	21	Katrina Guillou		(substituted off) 90+4'
CF	8	Chandler McDaniel		(substituted off) 88'
Substitutions:
DF	2	Malea Cesar		(substituted on) 46'
MF	12	Sara Castañeda		(substituted on) 70'
MF	15	Carleigh Frilles		(substituted on) 70'
MF	11	Anicka Castañeda	(yellow card) 90+1'	(substituted on) 88'
DF	14	Isabella Flanigan		(substituted on) 90+4'
Manager:
(Australia) Alen Stajcic

Assistant referees:
Trương Thị Lệ Trinh (Vietnam)
Park Mi-suk (South Korea)
Fourth official:
Asaka Koizumi (Japan)

=== Philippines vs Australia ===
24 January 2022
15:30

Philippines	0–4	Australia
	Report (FIFA); Report (AFC)	Kerr 51'; Randle 53' (o.g.); Van Egmond 67'; Fowler 87'

Mumbai Football Arena, Mumbai
Attendance: 0
Referee: Wang Chieh (Chinese Taipei)

Philippines

Team stats
Philippines	Statistic	Australia
3	Shots	33
2	Shots on target	8
26%	Possession	74%
208	Passes	550
44%	Pass accuracy	80%
6	Fouls	8
0	Yellow cards	1
0	Red cards	0
1	Offsides	1
0	Corners	16

Australia

GK	22	Kiara Fontanilla
RB	19	Eva Madarang	(substituted off) 59'
CB	5	Hali Long (c)
CB	3	Dominique Randle
LB	16	Sofia Harrison
CM	9	Jessica Miclat	(substituted off) 87'
CM	12	Sara Castañeda	(substituted off) 71'
CM	10	Ryley Bugay
AM	15	Carleigh Frilles	(substituted off) 71'
CF	8	Chandler McDaniel	(substituted off) 59'
CF	18	Sarina Bolden
Substitutions:
DF	2	Malea Cesar	(substituted on) 59'
MF	21	Katrina Guillou	(substituted on) 59'
DF	4	Tara Shelton	(substituted on) 71'
MF	11	Anicka Castañeda	(substituted on) 71'
MF	7	Camille Rodriguez	(substituted on) 87'
Manager:
(Australia) Alen Stajcic

GK	12	Teagan Micah
RB	21	Ellie Carpenter	(yellow card) 90+2'
CB	14	Alanna Kennedy
CB	4	Clare Polkinghorne
LB	7	Steph Catley		(substituted off) 72'
CM	10	Emily van Egmond
CM	13	Tameka Yallop		(substituted off) 81'
RW	17	Kyah Simon		(substituted off) 71'
AM	11	Mary Fowler
LW	9	Caitlin Foord		(substituted off) 71'
CF	20	Sam Kerr (c)		(substituted off) 80'
Substitutions:
DF	5	Cortnee Vine		(substituted on) 71'
FW	22	Holly McNamara		(substituted on) 71'
DF	2	Courtney Nevin		(substituted on) 72'
FW	23	Remy Siemsen		(substituted on) 80'
MF	19	Kyra Cooney-Cross		(substituted on) 81'
Manager:
(Sweden) Tony Gustavsson

Assistant referees:
Fang Yan (China PR)
Xie Lijun (China PR)
Fourth official:
Qin Liang (China PR)

=== Indonesia vs Thailand ===
24 January 2022
17:30

Indonesia	0–4	Thailand
	Report (FIFA); Report (AFC)	Kanyanat 27', 36', 71'; Irravadee 76'

DY Patil Stadium, Navi Mumbai
Attendance: 0
Referee: Yoshimi Yamashita (Japan)

Indonesia

Team stats
Indonesia	Statistic	Thailand
2	Shots	28
0	Shots on target	12
33%	Possession	67%
247	Passes	472
46%	Pass accuracy	74%
10	Fouls	11
2	Yellow cards	1
0	Red cards	0
4	Offsides	6
0	Corners	12

Thailand

GK	19	Fani Supriyanto		(substituted off) 60'
CB	4	Shalika Aurelia	(yellow card) 3'	(substituted off) 46'
CB	9	Ade Mustikiana (c)
CB	23	Reva Octaviani		(substituted off) 60'
RWB	6	Pani Oktavianti
LWB	18	Tia Darti Septiawati
DM	17	Vivi Oktavia
RM	11	Baiq Amiatun
CM	15	Helsya Maeisyaroh
LM	22	Insyafadya Salsabillah		(substituted off) 34'
CF	13	Marsela Yuliana	(yellow card) 15'	(substituted off) 34'
Substitutions:
FW	12	Zahra Muzdalifah		(substituted on) 34'
FW	16	Carla Bio		(substituted on) 34'
MF	10	Rani Mulyasari		(substituted on) 46'
DF	5	Sabrina Mutiara		(substituted on) 60'
GK	21	Riska Aprilia		(substituted on) 60'
Manager:
Rudy Eka Priyambada

GK	22	Tiffany Sornpao
CB	5	Amornrat Utchai
CB	16	Uraiporn Yongkul
CB	10	Sunisa Srangthaisong (c)	(yellow card) 29'
RM	11	Jaruwan Chaiyarak
CM	20	Wilaiporn Boothduang
CM	6	Pikul Khueanpet
LM	13	Kanyanat Chetthabutr
AM	3	Irravadee Makris
CF	17	Taneekarn Dangda		(substituted off) 73'
CF	19	Pitsamai Sornsai
Substitutions:
FW	14	Saowalak Pengngam		(substituted on) 73'
Manager:
(Japan) Miyo Okamoto

Assistant referees:
Makoto Bozono (Japan)
Kim Kyoung-min (South Korea)
Fourth official:
Công Thị Dung (Vietnam)

=== Australia vs Thailand ===
27 January 2022
19:30

Australia	2–1	Thailand
Van Egmond 39'; Kerr 80'	Report (FIFA); Report (AFC)	Nipawan 90+3'

Mumbai Football Arena, Mumbai
Attendance: 0
Referee: Thein Thein Aye (Myanmar)

Australia

Team stats
Australia	Statistic	Thailand
24	Shots	6
8	Shots on target	1
73%	Possession	27%
551	Passes	212
83%	Pass accuracy	50%
6	Fouls	7
1	Yellow cards	1
0	Red cards	0
2	Offsides	0
14	Corners	2

Thailand

GK	1	Lydia Williams
CB	8	Charlotte Grant
CB	3	Aivi Luik
CB	7	Steph Catley (c)		(substituted off) 46'
RM	5	Cortnee Vine		(substituted off) 76'
CM	19	Kyra Cooney-Cross
CM	10	Emily van Egmond		(substituted off) 65'
CM	6	Clare Wheeler	(yellow card) 18'
LM	2	Courtney Nevin
CF	22	Holly McNamara		(substituted off) 58'
CF	23	Remy Siemsen		(substituted off) 65'
Substitutions:
FW	17	Kyah Simon		(substituted on) 46'
FW	9	Caitlin Foord		(substituted on) 58'
MF	11	Mary Fowler		(substituted on) 65'
FW	20	Sam Kerr		(substituted on) 65'
FW	15	Emily Gielnik		(substituted on) 76'
Manager:
(Sweden) Tony Gustavsson

GK	22	Tiffany Sornpao
CB	9	Warunee Phetwiset	(yellow card) 6'	(substituted off) 73'
CB	2	Kanjanaporn Saenkhun		(substituted off) 83'
CB	4	Phornphirun Philawan
RM	23	Miranda Nild
CM	6	Pikul Khueanpet		(substituted off) 46'
CM	15	Orapin Waenngoen
LM	14	Saowalak Pengngam		(substituted off) 83'
AM	7	Silawan Intamee (c)		(substituted off) 73'
AM	3	Irravadee Makris
CF	19	Pitsamai Sornsai
Substitutions:
MF	8	Nipawan Panyosuk		(substituted on) 46'
DF	5	Amornrat Utchai		(substituted on) 73'
MF	21	Chatchawan Rodthong		(substituted on) 73'
FW	13	Kanyanat Chetthabutr		(substituted on) 83'
FW	17	Taneekarn Dangda		(substituted on) 83'
Manager:
(Japan) Miyo Okamoto

Assistant referees:
Trương Thị Lệ Trinh (Vietnam)
Ramina Tsoi (Kyrgyzstan)
Fourth official:
Veronika Bernatskaia (Kyrgyzstan)

=== Philippines vs Indonesia ===
27 January 2022
19:30

Philippines	6–0	Indonesia
Guillou 6'; Bolden 27'; Annis 56', 82'; Miclat 74' (pen.); Cesar 90+4'	Report (FIFA); Report (AFC)

Shiv Chhatrapati Sports Complex, Pune
Attendance: 0
Referee: Kim Yu-jeong (South Korea)

Philippines

Team stats
Philippines	Statistic	Indonesia
31	Shots	1
12	Shots on target	0
60%	Possession	40%
452	Passes	312
76%	Pass accuracy	65%
3	Fouls	8
0	Yellow cards	1
0	Red cards	0
9	Offsides	1
7	Corners	0

Indonesia

GK	23	Olivia McDaniel
CB	19	Eva Madarang	(substituted off) 76'
CB	3	Dominique Randle
CB	2	Malea Cesar
CM	9	Jessica Miclat
CM	10	Ryley Bugay	(substituted off) 78'
RW	6	Tahnai Annis (c)
AM	15	Carleigh Frilles
LW	21	Katrina Guillou	(substituted off) 64'
CF	8	Chandler McDaniel	(substituted off) 64'
CF	18	Sarina Bolden	(substituted off) 76'
Substitutions:
MF	11	Anicka Castañeda	(substituted on) 64'
MF	12	Sara Castañeda	(substituted on) 64'
MF	7	Camille Rodriguez	(substituted on) 76'
DF	14	Isabella Flanigan	(substituted on) 76'
DF	13	Morgan Brown	(substituted on) 78'
Manager:
(Australia) Alen Stajcic

GK	21	Riska Aprilia
RB	6	Pani Oktavianti
CB	4	Shalika Aurelia
CB	2	Remini Chere
LB	18	Tia Darti Septiawati		(substituted off) 88'
CM	17	Vivi Oktavia	(yellow card) 17'
CM	8	Maulina Novryliani (c)		(substituted off) 63'
RW	11	Baiq Amiatun
AM	7	Octavianti Dwi		(substituted off) 63'
LW	22	Insyafadya Salsabillah		(substituted off) 46'
CF	12	Zahra Muzdalifah		(substituted off) 46'
Substitutions:
FW	13	Marsela Yuliana		(substituted on) 46'
MF	15	Helsya Maeisyaroh		(substituted on) 46'
MF	10	Rani Mulyasari		(substituted on) 63'
FW	16	Carla Bio		(substituted on) 63'
MF	20	Viny Silfianus		(substituted on) 88'
Manager:
Rudy Eka Priyambada

Assistant referees:
Kim Kyoung-min (South Korea)
Lee Seul-gi (South Korea)
Fourth official:
Oh Hyeon-jeong (South Korea)

== Discipline ==
Fair play points would have been used as tie-breakers in the group if the overall and head-to-head records of teams were tied, or if teams had the same record in the ranking of third-placed teams. These were calculated based on yellow and red cards received in all group matches as follows:

- yellow card = 1 point
- red card as a result of two yellow cards = 3 points
- direct red card = 3 points
- yellow card followed by direct red card = 4 points

Team	Match 1				Match 2				Match 3				Points
Team	Booked	(yellow card) (yellow-red card)	Sent off (straight red)	(yellow card) (red card)	Booked	(yellow card) (yellow-red card)	Sent off (straight red)	(yellow card) (red card)	Booked	(yellow card) (yellow-red card)	Sent off (straight red)	(yellow card) (red card)	Points
Australia	1				1				1				–3
Indonesia					2				1				–3
Philippines	1												–1
Thailand	1				1				1				–3
