= 2026–27 Indonesia Women's League =

Indonesia Women's League
- Season: 2026–27
- Dates: 18 October 2026 – 30 January 2027
- Matches: 21
- Goals: 54 (2.57 per match)
- Top goalscorer: Grace Paradis (7 goals)
- Biggest home win: Dewa United 5–0 Garudayaksa (7 November 2026)
- Biggest away win: Persita 2–3 Persikad (14 November 2026); Persikad Women 2–3 Persija Jakarta Women (18 November 2026)
- Highest scoring: Dewa United Banten Women 5–0 Garudayaksa Women (7 November 2026)
- Longest winning run: Dewa United Banten Women (6 games)
- Longest unbeaten run: Dewa United Banten Women (6 games)
- Longest winless run: Garudayaksa Women (7 games)
- Longest losing run: Persita Women (5 games)
- Total attendance: 13,929

The 2026–27 Indonesia Women's League is the second season of the top-tier Indonesian women's football league previously known as the Liga 1 Putri and the inaugural season under its current name. The season will begin in 18 October 2026. The league is projected to end in January 2027 at earliest or before the start of Ramadan.

Persib Putri is the defending champions but they cannot defend their title as they are not listed in the league this season.

== Format ==
The 2026–27 Indonesia Women's League will have the six participating clubs play in a triple round robin, with each team playing 15 matches. The best teams will advance to a knock-out stage featuring the semifinals and a final.

== Schedule and venue ==
The schedule of the competition was as follows:

Stage	Gameweek	Date	Venue
Regular round	1	18 October 2026	Madya, Jakarta
Regular round	2	25 October 2026	Indomilk Arena, Tangerang (Note: Venue was moved from Patriot Candrabhaga, Bekasi to Indomilk Arena, Tangerang due to venue readiness concerns.)
Regular round	3	1 November 2026	Indomilk Arena, Tangerang
Regular round	4	7 November 2026	Indomilk Arena, Tangerang
Regular round	5	14 November 2026	Indomilk Arena, Tangerang
Regular round	6	18 November 2026	Indomilk Arena, Tangerang
Regular round	7	21 November 2026	Indomilk Arena, Tangerang
Regular round	8	6 December 2026	Indomilk Arena, Tangerang
Regular round	9	12 December 2026	Indomilk Arena, Tangerang
Regular round	10	16 December 2026	Indomilk Arena, Tangerang
Regular round	11	20 December 2026	Indomilk Arena, Tangerang
Regular round	12	27 December 2026	Indomilk Arena, Tangerang
Regular round	13	3 January 2027	Indomilk Arena, Tangerang
Regular round	14	18 January 2027	Indomilk Arena, Tangerang
Regular round	15	TBD	TBD
Knockout stage	Semi-finals	TBD	TBD
Knockout stage	Third place play-off	TBD	TBD
Knockout stage	Final	TBD	TBD

== Teams ==
A total of 6 teams will compete in this season.

=== Teams by province ===
Number	Province	Team(s)
3	West Java	Bekasi City, Garudayaksa, and Persikad
2	Banten	Dewa United Banten and Persita
1	Jakarta	Persija

=== Locations ===
Locations of teams in the 2026–27 Indonesia Women's League

Team	Location
Bekasi City	Bekasi
Dewa United Banten	Serang Regency
Garudayaksa	Bogor Regency
Persija	Jakarta
Persikad	Depok
Persita	Tangerang Regency

=== Personnel and kits ===
Women's League managers must obtain an AFC A license.

Note: Flags indicate national team as has been defined under FIFA eligibility rules. Players and coaches may hold more than one non-FIFA nationality.

Team	Manager	Captain	Kit manufacturer	Kit sponsors	
Team	Manager	Captain	Kit manufacturer	Main	Other(s)
Bekasi City	(Indonesia national football team) Rudy Eka Priyambada	(Indonesia national football team) Ade Mustikiana	(Indonesia) Drive	PStore	List: Front: PStore; Back: None; Sleeves: None; Shorts: None
Dewa United Banten	(Indonesia national football team) Dicky Firasat	(Indonesia national football team) Safira Ika	(Indonesia) DRX	BAIC Indonesia	List: Front: Cow Play Cow Moo; Back: Carstensz Residence and Mall BSD, Le Minerale; Sleeves: JHL Solitaire; Shorts: None
Garudayaksa	(Indonesia national football team) Yopie Riwoe	(Indonesia national football team) Remini Rumbewas	(Indonesia) DRX	None	List: Front: None; Back: None; Sleeves: Mitra Orphys Sports Clinic; Shorts: None
Persija	(Indonesia national football team) Ricky Nelson	(Indonesia national football team) Risa Afriyani Ulfa	(Germany) Adidas	Macan Kemayoran	List: Front: PAM Jaya, IKL; Back: Bank Jakarta; Sleeves: RS Premier Bintaro; Shorts: None
Persikad	(Indonesia national football team) Diego Tobing	(Indonesia national football team) Viny Silfianus	(Indonesia) XTen	None	List: Front: None; Back: None; Sleeves: None; Shorts: None
Persita	(Indonesia national football team) Febriardi Bobihoe	(Indonesia national football team) Ayunda Dwi Anggraini	(Indonesia) 1953	Indomilk	List: Front: Moya; Back: aetra, Netive, PMI, Kaboom Creative; Sleeves: Indomie; Shorts: None

=== Managerial changes ===
Team	Outgoing manager	Manner of departure	Date of vacancy	Position on table	Incoming manager	Date of appointment
Persija	Yusup Prasetiyo	Sacked	27 October 2026	6th in RR	Ricky Nelson	27 October 2026

== Foreign players ==
Each Women's League team can only register 4 foreign players. Heritage/naturalized players are counted as part of foreign quotas.

Team	Player 1	Player 2	Player 3	Player 4	Former players
Bekasi City	(Canada) Sofia Iaderosa	(Japan) Marin Kai	(Japan) Nao Tsukamoto	(United States) Miamour Mesa	
Dewa United Banten	(Indonesia) (Netherlands) Estella Loupatty	(Japan) Anna Hirakawa	(Puerto Rico) Imani Morlock	(United States) Jessica Wallace	
Garudayaksa					
Persija Jakarta	(Algeria) Lisa Jacob	(Japan) Michika Sakamoto	(Japan) Saki Nishihara	(Saint Kitts and Nevis) Christi-Anne Mills	
Persikad Depok	(Indonesia) (Netherlands) Isabelle Nottet	(Turkey) Gamze Bilmez	(United States) Grace Paradis		
Persita Tangerang					

== Regular round ==
Regular round consists of 6 teams, with each team playing against the other teams three times in a triple round-robin format.

=== Standings ===
Pos	Team	Pld	W	D	L	GF	GA	GD	Pts	Qualification
1	Dewa United Banten	7	6	0	1	16	2	+14	18	Advance to knockout round
2	Bekasi City	7	3	2	2	11	8	+3	11	Advance to knockout round
3	Persija	7	3	2	2	9	8	+1	11	Advance to knockout round
4	Persikad (Note: Persikad Women had 3 points deduction for exceeding the permitted number of substitutions in the match against Bekasi City on 7 November 2026.)	7	3	1	3	10	10	0	7	Advance to knockout round
5	Garudayaksa	7	0	4	3	3	11	−8	4	
6	Persita	7	1	1	5	5	15	−10	4	

Updated to match(es) played on 21 November 2026. Source: I-League
Rules for classification: 1) Points; 2) Head-to-head points; 3) Head-to-head goal difference; 4) Head-to-head goals scored; 5) Goal difference; 6) Goals scored; 7) Fair-play points; 8) Drawing of lots.

== Results ==
Home \ Away	FCB	DUB	GFC	PSJ	KAD	PTR	FCB	DUB	GFC	PSJ	KAD	PTR
Bekasi City			2–0		3–0 (Note: The Bekasi City vs Persikad match on 7 November 2026 ended in a 3–0 win for Bekasi City because Persikad made 4 substitutions.)	3–0						
Dewa United Banten	3–1		5–0	1–0		3–0						
Garudayaksa	1–1			1–1		0–1						
Persija	1–1	1–0			0–1	3–2						
Persikad	3–0	0–1	1–1	2–3								
Persita		0–3	0–0		2–3							

Updated to match(es) played on 21 November 2026. Source: I-League
Legend: Blue = home team win; Yellow = draw; Red = away team win.
For upcoming matches, an "a" indicates there is an article about the rivalry between the two participants.

== Knockout stage ==
=== Bracket ===
Semi-finals
1	1st-placed team
4	4th-placed team
2	2nd-placed team
3	3rd-placed team

Final
Winner of Semi-final 1
Winner of Semi-final 2
Third place play-off
Loser of Semi-final 1
Loser of Semi-final 2

=== Semi-finals ===
2027

1st-placed team	v	4th-placed team

2027

2nd-placed team	v	3rd-placed team

=== Third place play-off ===
2027

Loser of Semi-final 1	v	Loser of Semi-final 2

=== Final ===
2027

Winner of Semi-final 1	v	Winner of Semi-final 2

== Statistics ==
=== Top scorers ===
As of 18 November 2026

Rank	Player	Club	Goals
1	(United States) Grace Paradis	Persikad Depok	7
2	(Indonesia) Estella Loupatty	Dewa United Banten	5
3	(Japan) Nao Tsukamoto	Bekasi City	4
3	(Japan) Anna Hirakawa	Dewa United Banten	3
3	(Indonesia) Baiq Amiatun	Dewa United Banten	3
3	(Saint Kitts and Nevis) Christi-Anne Mills	Persija Jakarta	3
4	Four players		2
5	24 players		1

=== Hat-tricks ===
Player	For	Against	Result	Date
(Indonesia) Estella Loupatty	Dewa United Banten	Persita Tangerang	3–0 (H)	18 November 2026
(United States) Grace Paradis	Persikad Depok	Bekasi City	3–0 (H)	21 November 2026
