= Anna Hirakawa =

Japanese association football player

Personal information
- Date of birth: November 9, 1999 (age 27)
- Place of birth: Chiba, Japan
- Height: 1.68 m (5 ft 6 in)
- Position: Forward

Team information
- Current team: Dewa United FC
- Number: 25

Senior career*
Years	Team	Apps	(Gls)
2018–2022	Yokohama FC Seagulls	28	(5)
2023	Virginia United FC		
2024	Peninsula Power FC		
2025–2026	Brisbane City FC		
2026–	Dewa United FC	6	(3)
- * Club domestic league appearances and goals as of 12 November 2026

Anna Hirakawa (Japanese: 平川 杏奈; born 9 November 1999) is a Japanese professional footballer who plays as a forward for Dewa United FC in the Indonesia Women's League (IWL).

== Club career ==
=== Early career in Japan ===
Hirakawa began her professional career in Japan, playing for Yokohama FC Seagulls in the Nadeshiko League from 2018 to 2022.

=== Australia (2024–2026) ===
In 2023, she moved to Australia to play in the regional competitions, representing Virginia United FC Women in 2023, Peninsula Power FC in 2024, and Brisbane City FC from 2025 to 2026. In 2025, She helps Brisbane City FC Woman secured the NPL Queensland Championship for the second year in a row.

=== Dewa United FC Women (2026–present) ===
Ahead of the 2026–27 season of the Indonesia Women's League (IWL), Hirakawa joined Dewa United FC Women under head coach Dicky Firasat. In the squad, she plays alongside fellow Indonesian star player Safira Ika and Estella Loupatty. Hirakawa made her official club debut on 18 October 2026 Persikad Women. She scored her first goal in the league against Persita Women on 25 October 2026. Later, on 7 November 2026, she netted a brace (two goals) in a dominant 5–0 victory against Garudayaksa FC Women at Indomilk Arena.
