= List of Indonesia women's international footballers =

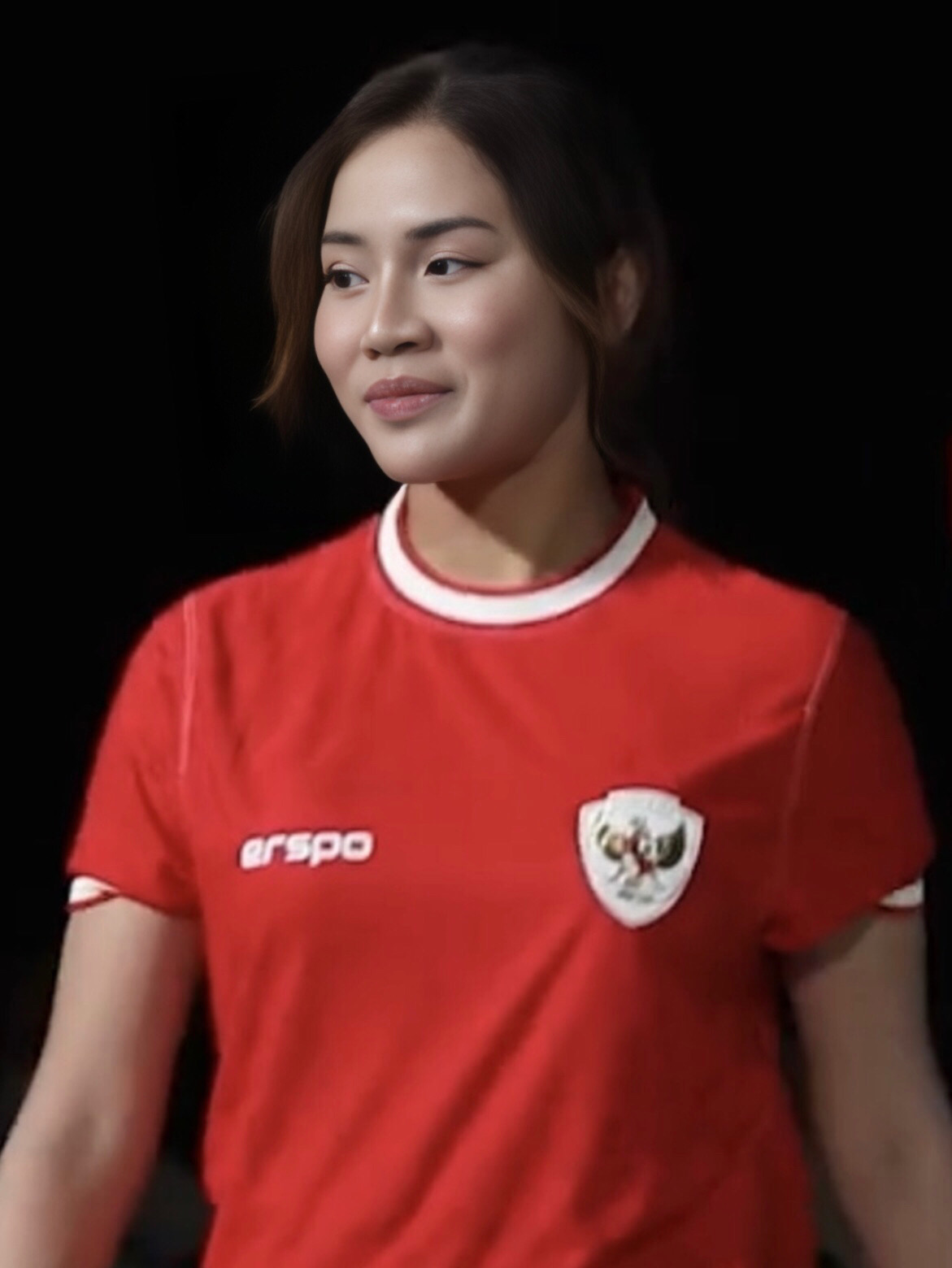
Safira Ika is the women's overall record holder, with 47 caps as of 13 October 2026.

Claudia Scheunemann is the all-time top scorer, having scored 9 goals in 26 matches.

The Indonesian women's national football team has represented Indonesia in international women's football matches since 1975. The women's national team is controlled by the Football Association of Indonesia (PSSI), the governing body for football in Indonesia, which is a part of AFC, under the jurisdiction of FIFA.

Safira Ika is the player with the most appearances for the Indonesian national team, with 47 caps since making her debut in 2018. She has also served as the women's national team captain. Claudia Scheunemann is the team's all-time leading goalscorer, with 9 goals in 26 appearances. Both players are recognized for their significant contributions to strengthening the women's national team and serving as inspirations for the development of women's football in Indonesia.

The following list of Indonesian women's international footballers covers all football players with official caps for the Indonesian women's national football team, as recorded by the Football Association of Indonesia. The players are listed here sorted first by the total number of caps, and then by the number of goals.

== Key ==
Positions key
Pre-1960s		1960s–	
GK	Goalkeeper		
FB	Full back	DF	Defender
HB	Half back	MF	Midfielder
FW	Forward		

Position
Playing positions are listed according to the tactical formations that were employed at the time. Thus the change in the names of defensive and midfield positions reflects the tactical evolution that occurred from the 1960s onwards.
Caps and goals
Caps and goals comprise those in the FIFA Women's World Cup and AFC Women's Asian Cup, their associated qualification matches, and international friendly tournaments and matches.

== List of players ==
As of 5 December 2024

Name	Pos.	Caps	Goals	National team career
Safira Ika	DF	39	1	2018–present
Ade Mustikiana	DF	30	2	2015–2022
Zahra Muzdalifah	FW	27	4	2018–present
Vivi Oktavia	MF	27	2	2018–present
Octavianti Dwi	MF	24	3	2018–present
Helsya Maeisyaroh	MF	18	1	2019–present
Baiq Amiatun	FW	17	5	2019–present
Marsela Awi	FW	16	4	2022–present
Nastasia Suci	MF	16	0	2022–present
Sheva Imut	MF	15	2	2022–present
Viny Silfianus	MF	15	0	2021–present
Tugiyati Cindy	MF	14	1	2011–2013
Shalika Aurelia	DF	14	0	2019–present
Mayang ZP	MF	13	4	2018–2021
Rani Mulyasari	MF	13	1	2018–2023
Claudia Scheunemann	FW	12	6	2023–present
Yuri Maryati	FW	12	4	1982–1986
Reva Octaviani	MF	12	4	2021–present
Muthia Datau	GK	12	0	1977–1980
Fani Supriyanto	GK	12	0	2021–present
Remini Rumbewas	DF	11	0	2022–present
Papat Yunisal	FW	10	3	1980–1989
Agnes Hutapea	DF	10	0	2022–present
Tia Darti	DF	10	0	2018–2023
Rukijah	FW	9	4	1986–1989
Atmini	FW	9	3	1985–1986
Carla Bio	FW	9	1	2018–2023
Nurhayati	MF	9	0	2021–2023
Rosdilah Nurrohmah	FW	9	0	2021–present
Iin Parbo	FW	8	3	1985–1986
Yudith Sada	FW	8	2	2008–2018
Marion Pakage	MF	8	1	2001–2005
Prihatini	GK	8	0	2019–present
Sabrina Mutiara	MF	8	0	2019–present
Jenny Merlin	FW	7	2	2001–2005
Gea Yumanda	DF	7	0	2023–present
Yakomina Swabra	FW	7	1	2001–2005
Jasella Arifya Sari	MF	6	1	2018–2019
Sydney Hopper	FW	6	1	2024–present
Gusriwati	DF	6	0	2001–2005
Laita Roati	GK	6	0	2023–present
Elan Kaligis	MF	5	2	1986
Citra Ramadhani	MF	5	2	2023–present
Rosita Pella	DF	5	1	1986
Katarina Stalin	MF	5	0	2023–present
Dewi Tia	FW	4	2	2019–2023
Lantang	FW	4	1	1977
Maulina Novryliani	MF	4	1	2008–2013
Wiwin Yuniggishi	FW	4	1	2004
Rosmita	MF	4	1	2005
Syenida Meryfandina	MF	4	1	2018–2019
Titas Susiana	DF	4	0	1986
Ellen Tria	DF	4	0	2024–present
Tiktik	MF	3	1	1985
Sarce Buaim	FW	3	1	2008
Henny Hardiana	FW	3	1	2011
Akudiana Tebai	MF	3	1	2011
Dorce Upuya	DF	3	0	1981
Nelce Libak	DF	3	0	1989
Amanda Florentinae	DF	3	0	2023–present
Estella Loupatty	MF	3	0	2024–present
Ina Wetipo	MF	3	0	2023–present
Pani Tri	DF	3	0	2022–2023
Insyafadya Salsabillah	FW	3	0	2021–2023
Fitri Rosdiana	FW	3	0	2013
Erma Karafir	FW	2	1	2015
Nabila Divany	DF	2	0	2024–present
Indira Jenna	DF	2	0	2024–present
Riska Aprilia	GK	2	0	2022–2023
Syafia Chorlienka	MF	2	0	2024–present
Anisya Widyawati	MF	2	0	2023–present
Firanda	FW	2	1	2018–2023
Thasza Amelia	GK	1	0	2024–present
Nasywa Zetira	MF	1	0	2024–present
Kayla Ristianto	MF	1	0	2024–present
Feni Binsbarek	MF	1	0	2024–present
Kikka Putri	FW	1	0	2024–present
Riri Junian	DF	1	0	2021
Nurhalimah	GK	1	0	2022
Diah Tri	DF	1	0	2022

== See also ==
- List of Indonesia international footballers
- List of Indonesia international footballers born outside Indonesia
