= F.C. Bekasi City (women) =

Indonesian women's football club

Bekasi City
- Full name: Football Club Bekasi City
- Nicknames: Laskar Kuda Hitam (Dark Horse Warriors)
- Short name: FCB
- Founded: 2026; 0 years ago
- Ground: Bekasi International Soccer Field
- Owner(s): PT Putra Siregar Merakyat; PT Bekasi Jayatama Mandiri
- Chairman: Putra Siregar
- Head coach: Rudy Eka Priyambada
- League: Indonesia Women's League
- Website: https://fcbekasi.calma.id/
Home colours	Away colours	Third colours

Football Club Bekasi City is an Indonesian professional women's football team based in Bekasi, Indonesia. The club was founded in 2026 and plays in the Indonesia Women's League, the top women's league in Indonesia. Bekasi City Women were a founding member of the Indonesia Women's League in 2026.

== History ==
=== Formation and inaugural season ===
After men's team of Bekasi City sold to Public Prosecution Service of Indonesia and rebranded as Adhyaksa Bekasi, Bekasi City Women were established as a women's football club entity using the name and nickname previously used by the men's team when competing in the Championship (formerly known as Liga 2) until the 2025-26 season.

Bekasi City Women take participation in the inaugural Indonesia Women's League in the 2026–27 season. The competition was organised under I-League and featured six participating clubs, including Bekasi City, Persija Jakarta, Persita Tangerang, Dewa United Banten, Persikad Depok and Garudayaksa.

The establishment of the league marked a new stage in the organisation of women's football in Indonesia, with I-League and the Football Association of Indonesia (PSSI) seeking to provide a professional competition for women's players. The inaugural season was scheduled to begin in October 2026, with matches held at Soemantri Brodjonegoro Stadium in Jakarta.

Bekasi City Women played their first match in the competition against Persija Jakarta Women on 18 October 2026 at Madya Stadium in Jakarta. The match ended in a 1–1 draw, marking the club's debut in the Indonesia Women's League.

== Players ==
=== Current squad ===
As of 18 October 2026

Note: Flags indicate national team as defined under FIFA eligibility rules; some limited exceptions apply. Players may hold more than one non-FIFA nationality.

No.	Pos.	Nation	Player
2	MF	IDN	Aulia Arifah
3	DF	JPN	Nao Tsukamoto
4	DF	IDN	Syafira Azzahra
5	MF	IDN	Sabrina Mutiara
6	DF	IDN	Pani Tri
7	MF	IDN	Dewi Tia
8	MF	JPN	Marin Kai
9	FW	IDN	Ade Mustikiana (captain)
10	FW	IDN	Rosalia
11	FW	IDN	Risa Rismawati
12	MF	IDN	Jasmine Sefia

No.	Pos.	Nation	Player
13	DF	USA	Miamour Mesa
14	MF	IDN	Aulia Mubraroh
16	MF	IDN	Chelsea
17	FW	CAN	Sofia Iaderosa
19	MF	IDN	Hanipa Halimatusyadiah
21	GK	IDN	Indri Yuliyanti
23	GK	IDN	Thasza Amelia
25	DF	IDN	Adinda Amelia
26	DF	IDN	Allya Afianti
87	DF	IDN	Ariska Kusuma
98	GK	IDN	Windy Ayu

== Season-by-season records ==
Season(s)	League	Tier	Tms.	Pos.
2026–27	Indonesia Women's League	1	6	TBD

== See also ==
- Indonesia Women's League
- Adhyaksa F.C. Bekasi
