= Jazlyn Kayla =

Indonesian footballer (born 2010)

Jazlyn Kayla Firyal
- Jazlyn with Indonesia U16 in 2025

Personal information
- Full name: Jazlyn Kayla Firyal
- Date of birth: 26 August 2010 (age 16)
- Place of birth: Indonesia
- Position: Defender

Team information
- Current team: Persikad Depok
- Number: 4

Youth career
- Asprov Jawa Barat
- Roket

Senior career*
Years	Team	Apps	(Gls)
2026–	Persikad Depok	5	(0)

International career
2025–	Indonesia U16	8	(3)
2025–	Indonesia U19	7	(2)
- * Club domestic league appearances and goals as of 18 October 2026

Jazlyn Kayla Firyal (born 26 August 2010) is an Indonesian footballer who plays as a defender for Indonesia Women's League club Persikad Depok. She represents Indonesia in youth international level.

== Club career ==
Jazlyn joined Persikad Depok ahead of the 2026–27 Indonesia Women's League season. She made her professional league debut on 18 October 2026 in a 1–0 defeat against Dewa United Banten at Madya Stadium in Jakarta.

== International career ==
Jazlyn has represented Indonesia at youth level. She played in the 2025 ASEAN U-16 Women's Championship, scoring against Timor-Leste and Malaysia during the group stage.

She also captained Indonesia in the 2026 AFC U-17 Women's Asian Cup qualification, scoring in a 2–0 win over Macau on 13 October 2025.
