= Ayunda Dwi Anggraini =

Indonesian footballer

- Ayunda with Indonesia U19 in 2023

Personal information
- Full name: Ayunda Dwi Anggraini
- Date of birth: 15 January 2006 (age 20)
- Place of birth: Gresik, Indonesia
- Position: Forward

Team information
- Current team: Persita Tangerang
- Number: 11

Senior career*
Years	Team	Apps	(Gls)
2026–	Persita Tangerang	6	(2)

International career
2023–2026	Indonesia U20	9	(4)
2025–	Indonesia	1	(0)
- * Club domestic league appearances and goals

Ayunda Dwi Anggraini (born 15 January 2006) is an Indonesian footballer who plays as a forward for Indonesia Women's League club Persita Tangerang, which she captains, and the Indonesia national team.

== Early life ==
Anggraini is from Gresik, East Java, Indonesia. Before pursuing football, she played futsal and represented the Gresik women's futsal team at the 2022 East Java Provincial Sports Week (Porprov), where the team won a bronze medal. She subsequently played in the Pertiwi Cup and was selected for Indonesia's under-19 women's national team after submitting videos of her performances during the selection process.

== Club career ==
In 2026, Anggraini joined Persita Tangerang ahead of the inaugural 2026–27 Indonesia Women's League season. The club identified her as one of its players with experience in the Indonesian national team setup.

Anggraini captained Persita in their opening league match against Garudayaksa on 18 October 2026. Persita won 1–0, with Diana Annisa scoring the decisive goal in stoppage time. After the match, Anggraini spoke about the team's determination and collective effort in securing the victory.

== International career ==
In July 2023, Anggraini made her debut for Indonesia U19 at the 2023 AFF U-19 Women's Championship in Palembang, Indonesia. She scored twice as Indonesia defeated Timor-Leste 7–0 in the opening group match, then scored against Laos in a 4–1 victory. She finished the tournament with four goals in three appearances.

In 2025, she was included in Indonesia's senior team squad for the 2025 SEA Games in Thailand.
