= Persita Tangerang (women) =

Persita Tangerang women's
- Full name: Persatuan Sepakbola Indonesia Kabupaten Tangerang Women
- Nicknames: Putri Cisadane (Cisadane Princesses)
- Short name: PTR
- Founded: 2026; 0 years ago
- Ground: Indomilk Arena
- Capacity: 15,000
- Owner: PT Persita Tangerang Raya
- Head coach: Febriardi Bobihoe
- League: Indonesia Women's League
- Website: persitafc.com
Home colours	Away colours

Persatuan Sepakbola Indonesia Tangerang (lit. 'Indonesian Football Association of Tangerang'), abbreviated as Persita (Indonesian pronunciation: [pərˈsita]), is an Indonesian professional women's football team based in Tangerang, Indonesia. The club was founded in 2026 and plays in the Indonesia Women's League, the top women's league in Indonesia.

Persita Women were a founding member of the Indonesia Women's League in 2026 and affiliated with Super League team Persita.

== History ==
Persita Women was established in 2026 as the women's football team affiliated with Persita Tangerang. The club was formed ahead of the inaugural season of the Indonesia Women's League, a professional women's football competition organised by I-League. Persita was named among the six participating clubs for the league's 2026–27 season, alongside Persija Jakarta, Dewa United, Bekasi City, Persikad Depok and Garudayaksa.

In preparation for the competition, Persita Women appointed Febriardi Bobihoe as head coach. The team began training more than a month before the league's scheduled opening, focusing on physical conditioning, stamina, team cohesion and tactical preparation. The coaching staff also arranged weekly friendly matches while continuing to assess players to complete the squad ahead of the start of the season.

Persita were scheduled to make their competitive debut against Persija Jakarta on 17 October 2026, in the opening match of the 2026–27 Indonesia Women's League at Soemantri Brodjonegoro Stadium in Jakarta. The inaugural competition featured six clubs and adopted a centralised venue format, with each team scheduled to face the other participants three times during the regular season.

== Squad ==
=== Current squad ===
As of 3 October 2026

Note: Flags indicate national team as defined under FIFA eligibility rules; some limited exceptions apply. Players may hold more than one non-FIFA nationality.

No.	Pos.	Nation	Player
1	GK	IDN	Gadhiza Asnanza
2	DF	IDN	Azra Zifa Kayla
3	DF	IDN	Henni Ulandari
4	MF	IDN	Syarifah Lita Anggarini
5	DF	IDN	Marcelinda Nurul Khusna
7	FW	IDN	Leni Maharani
8	MF	IDN	Nurhayati
9	MF	IDN	Nazly Olivia Azzami
10	FW	IDN	Fransiska Tokan
11	FW	IDN	Ayunda Dwi Anggraini (captain)
12	MF	IDN	Rindiana Refani
13	FW	IDN	Diana Annisa

No.	Pos.	Nation	Player
14	DF	IDN	Cessa Elyen Febriani
15	DF	IDN	Sela Seviany
16	FW	IDN	Sarah Davi
17	DF	IDN	Devi Safitri
18	MF	IDN	Michel Putri Arifiana
20	GK	IDN	Desca Nava Salsabilla
21	DF	IDN	Merisya Ika
22	DF	IDN	Jimbaran Jihan Jauhari
23	GK	IDN	Alleana Ayu Arumy
24	DF	IDN	Nesian Nayla
25	MF	IDN	Herlina Simangunsong

== Season-by-season records ==
Season(s)	League	Tier	Tms.	Pos.
2026–27	Indonesia Women's League	1	6	TBD
