= Bio =

Bio or BIO may refer to:

== Computing ==
- bio(4), a pseudo-device driver in RAID controller management interface in OpenBSD and NetBSD
- Block I/O, a concept in computer data storage

== Media and entertainment ==
- Bio (Australian TV channel)
- The Biography Channel (UK and Ireland)
- Bio (graffiti artist) Wilfredo Feliciano (born 1966)
- Bio (album), a Chuck Berry album released in 1973

== Organizations ==
- Bedford Institute of Oceanography
- Biographers International Organization
- Biotechnology Innovation Organization
- Belgian Investment Company for Developing Countries

== Energy ==
- Biofuel, fuel made from biomass
  - Biodiesel, the biofuel alternative for diesel
  - Biogas, a blend of gasses formed by the breakdown of organic matter used in renewable energy production
  - Biogasoline, the biofuel alternative for gasoline

== Places ==
- Bio, Azerbaijan, village in Astara Rayon
- Bio, Lot, commune in France
- Bilbao Airport, Spain, IATA airport code BIO
- British Indian Ocean Territory, ITU code BIO

== Other uses ==
- BIO, the Biennale of Design (Slovene: bienale oblikovanja Ljubljana), international design exhibition held since 1964 in Ljubljana, Slovenia
- Bio (given name)
- Bio (surname)
- Biography (abbreviation)
- Biology (prefix and abbreviation)
- Bioplastic, plastic made from biomass
- British Informatics Olympiad

== See also ==
- Bios (disambiguation)
