= Bioattack =

Bioattack may refer to:

- Bio-Attack, a 1983 shoot-em-up by Taito
- Biological warfare, attack
- Bioterrorism attack, a terrorist attack using biological weapons
- A specific attack with bioweapons, see History of biological warfare

== See also ==
- Bio (disambiguation)
- Attack (disambiguation)
