= Hutapea =

Batak surname originating in Indonesia

Hutapea is one of Toba Batak clans originating in North Sumatra, Indonesia. People of this clan bear the clan's name as their surname. Notable people of this clan include:

- Agnes Hutapea (born 2000), Indonesian footballer
- Hotman Paris Hutapea (born 1959), Indonesian lawyer
- Oloan Hutapea (1920s-1968), Indonesian communist
