= I/O System =

I/O System may refer to:

- DOS BIOS (Basic Input/Output System), a low-level component in DOS operating systems, including PC DOS and DR-DOS

- I/O System (86-DOS), the DOS-BIOS specifically in 86-DOS
- I/O System (MS-DOS), the DOS-BIOS specifically in MS-DOS

== See also ==
- BIOS, Basic Input/Output System
- XIOS, Extended Input/Output System
- CP/M BIOS, the BIOS in the CP/M family of operating systems
- BIOS (disambiguation)
- IOS (disambiguation)
- IOCS, Input/Output Control System
