= IOSS =

IOSS can refer to:

- Import One-Stop Shop, an electronic portal for declaration and payment of value-added tax when importing goods into the European Union
- Input/output subsystems, see for example Cray Y-MP
- Interagency OPSEC Support Staff, a U.S. government consultant to other U.S. government departments or agencies
- International Orchestra Safari Sound, a former Tanzanian band from 1985 to 1992
- Investigations & Operations Support Section, a branch of the American Federal Bureau of Investigation

== See also ==
- IOS (disambiguation)
