= Christi-Anne Mills =

Saint Kitts and Nevis footballer

- Mills with Persija in 2026

Personal information
- Full name: Christi-Anne K'Shanta Mills
- Date of birth: 27 July 2002 (age 24)
- Place of birth: Basseterre, Saint Kitts and Nevis
- Positions: Forward; midfielder

Team information
- Current team: Persija Jakarta
- Number: 27

College career
Years	Team	Apps	(Gls)
2022–2025	NWOSU Rangers	38	(8)

Senior career*
Years	Team	Apps	(Gls)
2023–2026	Newtown United		
2026–	Persija Jakarta	5	(3)

International career
2020–	Saint Kitts and Nevis U20	7	(0)
2020–2022	Saint Kitts and Nevis	8	(0)
- * Club domestic league appearances and goals as of 22 November 2026

Christi-Anne K'Shanta Mills (born 27 July 2002) is a Kittian professional footballer who plays as a forward or midfielder for Indonesia Women's League club Persija Jakarta and the Saint Kitts and Nevis national team.

== Club career ==
Mills played for Newtown United in Saint Kitts and Nevis, where she established herself as a prolific goalscorer in the Elvis Star Browne Women's League. In May 2023, she scored four goals in a 7–1 victory over Village Lady Superstars. In August 2026, she scored 11 goals across two matches for Newtown United.

Mills finished as the runner-up in the 2026 Elvis Star Browne Women's League Golden Boot race, scoring 29 goals during the regular season. She was the league's leading scorer heading into the final round of matches before being surpassed by Leranja Wilkinson, who scored 11 goals in her final regular-season match to finish with 30 goals and claim the Golden Boot.

Mills also played collegiate soccer for Northwestern Oklahoma State University in the United States. She appeared on the university's women's soccer roster in 2023 and 2024 and was named the Great American Conference's Offensive Player of the Week in September 2025 after scoring twice in a victory over Newman University.

In October 2026, Mills joined Persija Jakarta Women for the 2026–27 Indonesia Women's League season. The club announced her signing as its final foreign-player recruitment for the season.

== International career ==
Mills has represented Saint Kitts and Nevis at both senior and under-20 international levels. She made her senior international debut in January 2020 and recorded eight appearances without scoring. She also made seven appearances for the under-20 national team between February 2020 and March 2022.

== Honours ==
Newtown United

- SKNFA Elvis Star Browne Women's League: 2026

Individual

- SKNFA Elvis Star Browne Women's League Most Valuable Player: 2026
