= IOS (disambiguation) =

iOS is a mobile operating system developed by Apple Inc.

IOS or ios may also refer to:

== Technology ==
- Instructor operating station, in flight simulators
- International operator services, making an international call via a live telephone operator

=== Computing ===
- Cisco IOS, router and switch operating system
  - Cisco IOS XE
  - Cisco IOS XR
- ios (C++), a C++ header file ("input/output stream")
- I/O System (86-DOS), DOS BIOS in 86-DOS
- I/O System (MS-DOS), DOS BIOS in MS-DOS
- Input/Output Supervisor, a part of the control program in the IBM mainframe OS/360 operating system and its successors
- IOS (Wii firmware), firmware that runs on the Nintendo Wii used with Wii homebrew
- Internet operating system, any operating system designed to run all of its applications and services through an Internet client, generally a web browser
- Interorganizational system, a system between organizations

== Organizations ==
- Illinois Ornithological Society, American state-based bird club
- Institute for Objectivist Studies, the former name of The Atlas Society
- Institute of Oriental Studies of the Russian Academy of Sciences
- International Organizations for Succulent Plant Research, in Zürich, Switzerland
- Interorbital Systems, an aerospace design firm in Mojave, California, US
- Investors Overseas Service, an investment company

== Places ==
- Ios, a Greek island
- Ilhéus Jorge Amado Airport (IATA airport code), Ilhéus, Brazil

== Media ==
- IOS Press, a Dutch scientific and medical publisher
- Independent on Sunday, a UK newspaper
- Ireland on Sunday, an Irish newspaper published from 1996 to 2006

== Other uses ==
- International Open Series, an amateur snooker tour
- Island of Sodor, fictional location in The Railway Series books and the Thomas & Friends franchise

== See also ==
- eyeOS
- I/O System (disambiguation)
- IO (disambiguation)
- Input/Output Control System (IOCS)
- International Organization for Standardization (ISO)
- BIOS (disambiguation)
- XIOS, Extended Input/Output System
