= Persikad Depok (women) =

Persikad Depok women's
- Full name: Persatuan Sepakbola Indonesia Kota Administratif Depok
- Nicknames: Srikandi Margonda (Margonda Princesses)
- Short name: KAD
- Founded: 2026; 0 years ago
- Ground: Merpati Stadium
- Capacity: 10,000
- Owner: Abdullah Alatas
- Head coach: Diego Tobing
- League: Indonesia Women's League
Home colours	Away colours

Persatuan Sepakbola Indonesia Kota Administratif Depok (lit. 'Indonesian Football Association of Depok Administrative City'), abbreviated as Persikad (Indonesian pronunciation: [pərˈsikad]), is an Indonesian professional women's football team based in Depok, Indonesia. The club was founded in 2026 and plays in the Indonesia Women's League, the top women's league in Indonesia.

Persikad Women were a founding member of the Indonesia Women's League in 2026 and affiliated with Championship team Persikad Depok.

== History ==
Persikad Depok Women were established in 2026 ahead of the inaugural season of the Indonesia Women's League (IWL), Indonesia's national women's football competition. The league was officially launched on 11 August 2026, with its inaugural season scheduled to begin in October. Persikad were among the six clubs selected to participate in the competition, alongside Bekasi City, Dewa United Banten, Persija Jakarta, Persita Tangerang and Garudayaksa.

The formation of the women's team marked Persikad's entry into organised women's football at the national level. The club's participation in the new league formed part of a broader initiative to provide a more professional competitive platform for women's football in Indonesia. The inaugural competition was organised in a centralised format, with all six participating teams scheduled to play at Soemantri Brodjonegoro Stadium in Jakarta.

In preparation for the 2026–27 season, Persikad recruited players from Indonesia's women's national team setup and signed Dutch player Isabelle Nottet, who had previously played for Hera United in the Vrouwen Eerste Divisie. Her arrival was reported by ANTARA on 20 August 2026 as part of the club's preparations for its debut in the Indonesia Women's League.

Ahead of their first league campaign, Persikad expressed their ambition to compete for the title despite interruptions to their preparations caused by national-team training camps. In October 2026, I.League reported that the team was targeting a strong debut, with its opening match scheduled for 18 October. The club's early squad included several Indonesian women's national-team players alongside Nottet.

== Players ==
=== Current squad ===
As of 18 October 2026

Note: Flags indicate national team as defined under FIFA eligibility rules; some limited exceptions apply. Players may hold more than one non-FIFA nationality.

No.	Pos.	Nation	Player
2	GK	IDN	Resti Rosalina
3	MF	USA	Grace Paradis
4	DF	IDN	Jazlyn Kayla
5	DF	IDN	Gea Yumanda
6	DF	IDN	Ayu Lidya
8	MF	IDN	Daeng Rosma
9	DF	IDN	Sherli Anggraini
11	FW	IDN	Isabelle Nottet
12	GK	IDN	Naila Dinda
13	MF	IDN	Zilfa Zevanya
14	DF	IDN	Chalista Kurniadi

No.	Pos.	Nation	Player
16	FW	IDN	Dinda Yosephine Manurung
19	MF	IDN	Viny Silfianus
20	FW	IDN	Nasywa Salsabila
21	GK	IDN	Shesilia Putri Desrina
23	DF	IDN	Nofa Pertiwi
25	MF	IDN	Syafia Chorlienka
27	DF	IDN	Zalfa Alya
33	MF	IDN	Mega Aprilia
77	FW	IDN	Rosdilah Nurrohmah
88	MF	TUR	Gamze Bilmez
99	FW	IDN	Bunga Syifa Fadillah

== Season-by-season records ==
Season(s)	League	Tier	Tms.	Pos.
2026–27	Indonesia Women's League	1	6	TBD
