= Garudayaksa F.C. (women) =

Indonesian women's football club

Garudayaksa Women
- Full name: Garudayaksa Football Club
- Nickname: Spirit of Garuda
- Short name: GFC
- Founded: 2026; 0 years ago
- Head coach: Yopie Riwoe
- League: Indonesia Women's League
- Website: www.gfa-indonesia.com
Home colours	Away colours

Garudayaksa Football Club is an Indonesian professional women's football team based in Bogor, Indonesia. The club was founded in 2026 and plays in the Indonesia Women's League, the top women's league in Indonesia. Garudayaksa Women were a founding member of the Indonesia Women's League in 2026 and affiliated with Super League team Garudayaksa.

== History ==
Garudayaksa Women was among the six clubs announced as participants in the inaugural Indonesia Women's League in 2026. The other participating clubs were Bekasi City, Persikad Depok, Dewa United Banten, Persija Jakarta and Persita Tangerang.

In October 2026, head coach Yopie Riwoe outlined the club's preparations for the competition, stating that player recruitment was being conducted using existing player data and through direct contact with prospective players. At the time, the squad comprised 21 players, two of whom were temporarily absent due to national-team commitments.

== Players ==
=== Current squad ===
As of 12 October 2026 Note: Flags indicate national team as defined under FIFA eligibility rules; some limited exceptions apply. Players may hold more than one non-FIFA nationality.

No.	Pos.	Nation	Player
1	GK	IDN	Prihatini
2	DF	IDN	Siti Nuriyah
5	DF	IDN	Amelia Heselo
6	MF	IDN	Nastasia Suci
7	DF	IDN	Octavianti Dwi
8	FW	IDN	Haviva Oktaditya
9	MF	IDN	Sri Maharani
10	MF	IDN	Valencia Antogia
11	DF	IDN	Feni Binsbarek
12	FW	IDN	Anitha Sroyer
13	MF	IDN	Zahra Naqiyyah

No.	Pos.	Nation	Player
14	DF	IDN	Ellen Tria Ferlika
16	FW	IDN	Sulfiati
17	FW	IDN	Anisya Widyawati
18	FW	IDN	Marsela Awi
19	GK	IDN	Fani Supriyanto
23	DF	IDN	Agnes Hutapea
27	MF	IDN	Salsa Nabila
88	DF	IDN	Remini Rumbewas (captain)
—	MF	IDN	Nanda Wayangkau

== Season-by-season records ==
Season(s)	League	Tier	Tms.	Pos.
2026–27	Indonesia Women's League	1	6	TBD

== See also ==
- Indonesia Women's League
- Garudayaksa F.C.
