= Bio (surname) =

Bio is the surname of the following notable people:

- Benito Owusu Bio (born 1968), Ghanaian politician
- Carla Bio (born 2002), Indonesian football forward
- Fatima Bio (born 1980), Sierra Leonean actress and screenwriter, wife of Julius
- Ibrahim Bio (born April 1957), Nigerian politician
- Julius Maada Bio (born 1964), Sierra Leonean politician
- Rose Atinga Bio (born 1957), Ghanaian police commissioner
