= Isabelle Nottet =

Dutch association footballer (born 2003)

Personal information
- Full name: Isabelle Nottet
- Date of birth: 6 March 2003 (age 23)
- Place of birth: Uithoorn, Netherlands
- Position: Forward

Team information
- Current team: Persikad Depok
- Number: 11

Youth career
- Legmeervogels
- Combinatie Sportclub Wilnis

Senior career*
Years	Team	Apps	(Gls)
2020–2023	Alkmaar	15	(1)
2023–2025	Telstar	40	(2)
2025–2026	Hera United	13	(1)
2026–	Persikad Depok	5	(1)

International career^{‡}
2025–	Indonesia	9	(1)
- * Club domestic league appearances and goals as of 26 April 2026 ‡ National team caps and goals as of 9 October 2026

Isabelle Nottet (born 6 March 2003) is a professional footballer who plays as a forward for Indonesia Women's League club Persikad Depok. Born in the Netherlands, she plays for the Indonesia national team.

== Club career ==
Nottet played for Legmeervogels and CSW Wilnis in her youth years before switching to the Youth Academy of Alkmaar. In the 2020–21 season, Nottet made her debut for VV Alkmaar in the women's Eredivisie in an away match against Excelsior, where she also managed to score her first goal for Alkmaar.

In the 2022–23 season, she returned to Telstar. Following the conclusion of the debut season, Nottet was presented as the first new signing for in the 2023–24 season on 24 May 2023. On 9 September 2023, Nottet made her debut for Telstar in an away match against PSV. Nottet scored her first goal for Telstar on 1 May 2024 in a home match against AZ. She extended her contract by one year on 23 August 2024.

Nottet scored two goals in 40 league games for Telstar, before the club licence was taken over by Hera United, the first independent women's football club in the Netherlands.

In August 2026, Nottet is introduced as one of few players to have confirmed to join Indonesia Women's League. She then confirmed to join the Persikad Women team for the 2026-2027 season.

== Career statistics ==
As of match played 26 April 2026

Appearances and goals by club, season and competition
Club	Season	League			KNVB Cup		Other		Total	
Club	Season	Division	Apps	Goals	Apps	Goals	Apps	Goals	Apps	Goals
Alkmaar	2020–21	Eredivisie	4	1	0	0	0	0	4	1
Alkmaar	2021–22	Eredivisie	4	0	0	0	0	0	4	0
Alkmaar	2022–23	Eredivisie	7	0	2	0	0	0	9	0
Alkmaar	Total		15	1	2	0	0	0	17	1
Telstar	2023–24	Eredivisie	22	1	1	0	0	0	23	1
Telstar	2024–25	Eredivisie	18	1	0	0	0	0	18	1
Telstar	Total		40	2	1	0	0	0	41	2
Hera United	2025–26	Eredivisie	13	1	1	0	0	0	14	1
Career total			68	4	4	0	0	0	72	4

== International career ==
Nottet obtained Indonesian citizenship through naturalization in August 2025, which made her eligible to play for the Indonesia national team.

== Career statistics ==
=== Club ===
As of match played 26 April 2026

Appearances and goals by club, season and competition
Club	Season	League			KNVB Cup		Other		Total	
Club	Season	Division	Apps	Goals	Apps	Goals	Apps	Goals	Apps	Goals
Alkmaar	2020–21	Eredivisie	4	1	0	0	0	0	4	1
Alkmaar	2021–22	Eredivisie	4	0	0	0	0	0	4	0
Alkmaar	2022–23	Eredivisie	7	0	2	0	0	0	9	0
Alkmaar	Total		15	1	2	0	0	0	17	1
Telstar	2023–24	Eredivisie	22	1	1	0	0	0	23	1
Telstar	2024–25	Eredivisie	18	1	0	0	0	0	18	1
Telstar	Total		40	2	1	0	0	0	41	2
Hera United	2025–26	Eredivisie	13	1	1	0	0	0	14	1
Career total			68	4	4	0	0	0	72	4

=== International ===
As of match played 22 July 2026
Indonesia score listed first, score column indicates score after each Nottet goal

List of international goals scored by Isabelle Nottet
No.	Date	Venue	Opponent	Score	Result	Competition
1	22 July 2026	Kuala Lumpur Stadium, Kuala Lumpur, Malaysia	Laos	2–0	5–0	2026 AFF Women's Cup

== Honours ==
Indonesia

- AFF Women's Cup: 2026

== See also ==
- List of Indonesia international footballers born outside Indonesia
