= Imani Morlock =

Puerto Rican footballer (born 1997)

Personal information
- Full name: Imani Ariana Morlock
- Date of birth: June 14, 1997 (age 29)
- Place of birth: Rio Rancho, New Mexico, U.S.
- Height: 1.70 m (5 ft 7 in)
- Position: Defender

Team information
- Current team: Dewa United Banten
- Number: 22

Youth career
- –2015: New Mexico Rush

College career
Years	Team	Apps	(Gls)
2015–2019	Midwestern State Mustangs	75	(3)

Senior career*
Years	Team	Apps	(Gls)
2020–2021	Aprilia Racing		
2021–2023	Puerto Rico Sol	22	(1)
2023–2024	Bnot Netanya		
2024–2025	Mitchelton		
2025	Acharnaikos	2	(0)
2025–2026	Odysseas Moschatou	6	(0)
2026–	Dewa United Banten	1	(0)

International career^{‡}
2021–	Puerto Rico	6	(0)
- * Club domestic league appearances and goals as of 28 December 2025 ‡ National team caps and goals as of June 15, 2021 Hh

Imani Ariana Morlock (born June 14, 1997) is a footballer who plays as a defender for Indonesia Women's League club Dewa United Banten. Born in the United States, she plays for the Puerto Rico national team.

== Early life ==
Morlock attended Rio Rancho High School and played youth soccer for New Mexico Rush Soccer Club. She majored in kinesiology at Midwestern State University.

== Club career ==
=== Racing Aprilia ===
In October 2020, Morlock signed with Serie C side F.C. Aprilia Racing Club.

== International career ==
In March 2021, Morlock accepted a call-up to the Puerto Rico women's national team.
