= Rudy Eka Priyambada =

Indonesian football manager

Rudy Eka
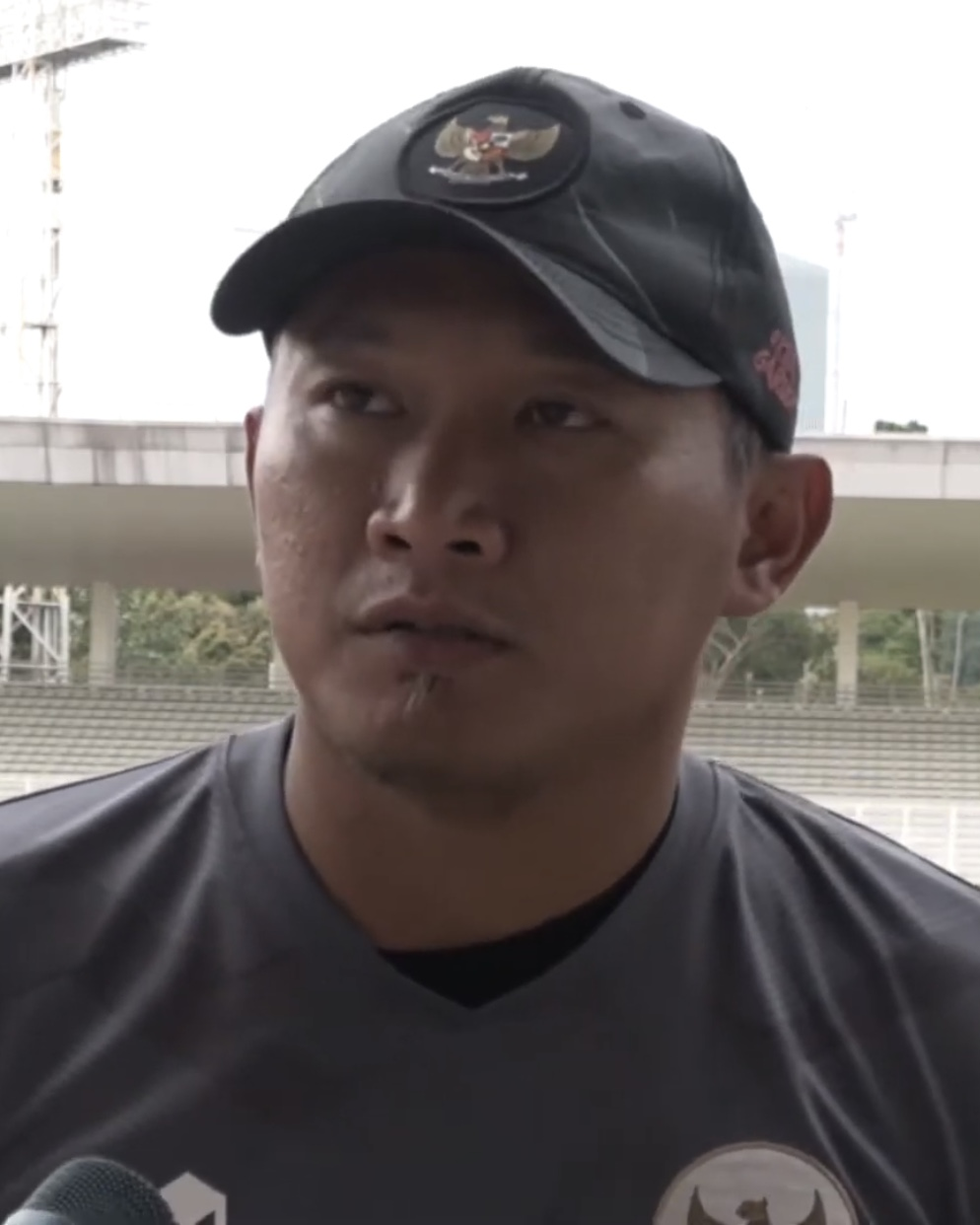
- Priyambada in 2022

Personal information
- Full name: Rudy Eka Priyambada
- Date of birth: 5 December 1982 (age 43)
- Place of birth: Jakarta, Indonesia

Team information
- Current team: Bekasi City Women (head coach)

Managerial career
- Years: Team
- 2012: Monbulk Rangers
- 2013: Bali Devata
- 2014: Mitra Kukar (assistant)
- 2014: Mitra Kukar
- 2015: Al-Najma (assistant)
- 2016: Celebest
- 2017: PS TIRA
- 2021–2023: Indonesia Women
- 2022–2023: Indonesia U19 Women
- 2023: Gresik United
- 2023–2024: Persiba Balikpapan
- 2025: Persijap Jepara (assistant)
- 2025–2026: Al-Nassr Women (assistant)
- 2026–: Bekasi City Women

Rudy Eka Priyambada is an Indonesian professional football coach who is currently the head coach of Indonesia Women's League club Bekasi City Women.

== Coaching career ==
On 20 January 2021, Rudy was officially appointed as head coach of the Indonesia women's national team

In September 2021, under Rudy, Indonesia qualified for the 2022 AFC Women's Asian Cup for the first time since 1989 after a 33 year absence. In the final tournament however, Indonesia lost all of their matches without scoring a goal, including a 18—0 defeat against Australia, the nation's worst defeat of all time.

On August 1 2023, Rudy was appointed as head coach of Liga 2 club Gresik United, however he left the club on 20 November 2023. A week later on 28 November 2023, Rudy became the head coach of Persiba Balikpapan. That season the club was relegated to Liga 3.

On 6 July 2025, Rudy joined Al-Nassr Women as head coach. Prior to this move, he had briefly served as technical director and assistant coach at Persijap Jepara from early May to the end of June 2025.
