= Dicky Firasat =

Indonesian footballer

Personal information
- Full name: Dicky Firasat
- Date of birth: 16 July 1981 (age 45)
- Place of birth: Bandung, Indonesia
- Height: 1.75 m (5 ft 9 in)
- Position: Striker

Team information
- Current team: Dewa United Banten Women (head coach)

Youth career
- SSB Garuda
- SSB Sidolig
- Kwalram

Senior career*
Years	Team	Apps	(Gls)
1999–2003	Persikabo Bogor	55	(20)
2003–2008	Persib Bandung	28	(4)
2006−2007	→ Persikab Bandung (loan)	20	(5)
2008–2010	Persela Lamongan	50	(16)
2010–2011	Persibo Bojonegoro	15	(4)
2011–2012	Arema Indonesia	13	(2)
2013−2014	Persijap Jepara	37	(8)
2014–2015	Persik Kediri	17	(5)
2015–2016	PSBK Blitar	8	(0)
2016–2017	Persatu Tuban	18	(6)
2017–2018	Persiba Bantul	23	(12)
Total		284	(82)

Managerial career
- 2026–: Dewa United Banten Women
- * Club domestic league appearances and goals

Dicky Firasat (born 16 July 1981) is an Indonesian football manager and former professional player. He is currently the head coach of Indonesia Women's League club Dewa United Banten Women.
