= Bios =

Bios or BIOS may refer to:

== Arts, entertainment, and media ==
- Bios (album), the third album by Costa Rican music group Gandhi
- Bios (novel), a 1999 science fiction novel by Robert Charles Wilson
- BIOS, the original title of the 2021 American science fiction drama film Finch
- BIOS (journal), the society journal of the Tri Beta society
- BIOS Faction, a fictional group in the Allegiance video game
- "BIOS", a track on Blank Banshee's 2016 album MEGA

== Computing ==
- BIOS (Basic Input/Output System), a de facto standard firmware interface of IBM PC-compatible computers
  - AMI BIOS, manufactured by American Megatrends
  - Award BIOS, manufactured by Award Software
  - BIOS (CP/M), the BIOS in the CP/M family of operating systems
  - Insyde BIOS, manufactured by Insyde Software
  - Phoenix BIOS, manufactured by Phoenix Technologies
- DOS-BIOS, the equivalent of the CP/M component in some DOS operating systems, IBMBIO.COM in PC DOS
  - IO.SYS, in MS-DOS
  - NetBIOS

== Organisations ==
- Bermuda Institute of Ocean Sciences
- Biological Innovation for Open Society
- BIOS-3, a closed ecosystem at the Institute of Biophysics in Krasnoyarsk, Russia
- BIOS Centre for the Study of Bioscience, Biomedicine, Biotechnology and Society, at the London School of Economics, United Kingdom
- British Institute of Organ Studies, for the study and appreciation of pipe organs

== Other uses ==
- Bios (philosophy), a philosophical concept of Giorgio Agamben
- Biographies, or bios

== See also ==
- Bio (disambiguation)
- ROS (disambiguation)
