= Fani Supriyanto =

Indonesian footballer

Personal information
- Date of birth: 30 May 2004 (age 22)
- Place of birth: Banjarnegara, Indonesia
- Position: Goalkeeper

Team information
- Current team: Garudayaksa
- Number: 19

Senior career*
Years	Team	Apps	(Gls)
–2022	Asprov Jateng		
2022–2023	Persis Women		
2023–2026	Al-Hmmah	7	(0)
2026–	Garudayaksa	0	(0)

International career^{‡}
2018	Indonesia U16	2	(0)
2022–	Indonesia U20	4	(0)
2021–	Indonesia	12	(0)
- * Club domestic league appearances and goals as of 2 March 2024 ‡ National team caps and goals as of 14 July 2024.

Fani Supriyanto (born 30 May 2004) is an Indonesian footballer who plays a goalkeeper for Indonesia Women's League club Garudayaksa and the Indonesia national team.

== Club career ==
Fani played for Asprov Jateng and Persis Women in Indonesia.

== International career ==
Fani represented Indonesia at the 2022 AFC Women's Asian Cup.
