= Beta Beta Beta =

American undergraduate honors society

- ΒΒΒ
- Founded: 1922; 104 years ago Oklahoma City University
- Type: Honor
- Affiliation: Independent
- Status: Active
- Emphasis: Biological Sciences
- Scope: National (US)
- Motto: Blepein Basin Biou "To See the Foundation of Life"
- Colors: Blood red and Leaf green
- Flower: American Beauty rose
- Publication: BIOS
- Chapters: 553
- Members: 200,000+ lifetime
- Nickname: TriBeta
- Headquarters: One Harrison Plaza, Box 5079; Florence, Alabama 35632; United States
- Website: www.tri-beta.org

Beta Beta Beta (ΒΒΒ or TriBeta), is a collegiate honor society and academic fraternity for students of the biological sciences. It was founded in 1922 at Oklahoma City University by Dr. Frank G. Brooks and a group of his students. As of 2012, it has 553 chapters in the United States with over 200,000 members. The society's journal, BIOS, publishes research papers by undergraduates.

== History ==
In 1922, Frank Brooks proposed the organization of a biology fraternity to a group of biology majors at Oklahoma City University. Five students joined him to join the first or Alpha chapter.

In 1923, a student from Simpson College attended a summer session at Oklahoma City University, and expressed interest in the society. Upon returning to Simpson College a charter was applied for and granted as Beta chapter, however, the chapter was not installed until 1927. By that time, both Gamma chapter at Western State College and Delta at Southwestern College had been installed.

In December 1925, representatives from Alpha, Gamma, and Delta chapters met, decided that Beta Beta Beta would no longer be secret, abolished the rituals used until that time, formed a National Organization, and elected national officers.

== Symbols ==
Beta Beta Beta's motto is Blepein Basin Biou or "To See the Foundation of Life". The society's colors are blood red and leaf green. Its flower is the American Beauty rose. Its publication is BIOS.

== Chapters ==
As of 2012, Beta Beta Beta has 553 chapters in the United States with over 200,000 members.
