= Bio (given name) =

Bio is a given name. Notable people with the name include:

- Bio De Casseres (1875–1964), American author
- Bio Paulin (born 1984), Indonesian football player and coach, politician, and internet celebrity
