= Illinois Ornithological Society =

American nonprofit organization

The Illinois Ornithological Society (IOS) is the principal birding and bird conservation organization in the American state of Illinois. It produces a quarterly magazine, Meadowlark, A Journal of Illinois Birds. A website is also available and features updates on rare bird sightings in the state as well as profiles of local birders and links to upcoming field trips.

The objectives of the IOS are to promote scientific research and education in order to improve knowledge and awareness of birds in Illinois, publish a journal and keep a permanent historical record of its bird life, maintain an up-to-date state checklist, and support the well-being of birds and birding in the state.

The IOS also sponsors the Illinois Young Birders Club, which is open to all state birders ages 18 and younger.

The IOS has a standing committee (the Illinois Ornithological Records Committee), founded in 1985, which evaluates the evidence for records of birds that are rare or unusual in the state, and which is responsible for publishing and maintaining the official checklist of Illinois birds.
