= Miyo Okamoto =

Japanese footballer and manager

Miyo Okamoto 岡本三代
Personal information
- Full name: Miyo Okamoto
- Date of birth: July 1, 1978 (age 48)
- Place of birth: Kōchi, Japan
- Height: 1.65 m (5 ft 5 in)
- Position: Midfielder

Senior career*
Years	Team	Apps	(Gls)
1994–1998	Suzuyo Shimizu FC Lovely Ladies		
1999–2000	Kumamoto Renaissance FC		
2001–2003	Okayama Yunogo Belle		
2004–2005	Bene Gruppo		
2006–2008	Kochi Ganador FC		

Managerial career
- 2006–2012: Kochi Ganador FC
- 2009–2012: Kochi Ganador FC Jr.
- 2013–2018: Cerezo Osaka Sakai Girls
- 2019–2020: Cerezo Osaka Sakai Ladies
- 2021–2023: Thailand women
- 2021–2023: Thailand women U20
- * Club domestic league appearances and goals

Miyo Okamoto (岡本三代, Okamoto Miyo; born 1 July 1978) is a Japanese football manager and former player who played as a midfielder. She was most recently the head coach of the Thailand senior and under-20 women's national teams.

== Managerial statistics ==
As of 21 February 2023

Team	From	To	Record							
Team	From	To	P	W	D	L	GF	GA	GD	Win %
Thailand (senior)	22 January 2021	28 February 2023	24	12	3	9	47	27	+20	50.00
Thailand U-20	22 January 2021	28 February 2023	6	4	0	2	15	2	+13	66.67
Career totals			30	16	3	11	62	29	+33	53.33

== Honours ==
=== Manager ===
Thailand Women

- 2021 Southeast Asian Games: Silver medal
- AFF Women's Championship runner-up: 2022

== See also ==
- Japan Football Association (JFA)
