= Helsya Maeisyaroh =

Indonesian footballer (born 2005)

- Helsya with Indonesia in 2025

Personal information
- Date of birth: 7 May 2005 (age 21)
- Place of birth: Bekasi, Indonesia
- Position: Midfielder

Team information
- Current team: Dewa United Banten
- Number: 15

Senior career*
| Years | Team | Apps | (Gls) |
| 2019 | TIRA-Persikabo | | |
| 2021–2022 | Arema | 7 | (1) |
| 2022–2024 | Persis Solo | | |
| 2024–2025 | FC Ryukyu | 12 | (3) |
| 2025–2026 | Kelana United | 2 | (0) |
| 2026– | Dewa United Banten | 5 | (0) |

International career^{‡}
| 2018 | Indonesia U16 | 4 | (0) |
| 2022– | Indonesia U20 | 11 | (3) |
| 2019– | Indonesia | 40 | (2) |
- * Club domestic league appearances and goals as of 22 October 2024 ‡ National team caps and goals as of 22 July 2025

Helsya Maeisyaroh (born 7 May 2005) is an Indonesian footballer who plays as a midfielder for Indonesia Women's League club Dewa United Banten and the Indonesia national team.

== Club career ==
=== Arema ===
In February 2022, Helsya signed a contract with Women's Liga 1 club Arema Putri.

=== Persis Solo ===
In mid 2022, Persis Solo founded their women's team. Helsya was one of many players announced in May 2022 for their first season.

=== Kelana United ===
On 14 August 2025, it was officially announced that Helsya has signed with Kelana United.

== International career ==
Helsya represented Indonesia at the 2022 AFC Women's Asian Cup.

On 10 October 2022, Helsya scored her debut goal against Singapore from the kick-off distance, in the 92nd minute of the match, in a 2–1 win in a friendly match.

== Career statistics ==
=== International ===
As of match played 5 July 2025
Indonesia score listed first, score column indicates score after each Helsya goal

List of international goals scored by Helsya Meisyaroh
| No. | Date | Venue | Opponent | Score | Result | Competition |
|---|---|---|---|---|---|---|
| 1 | 10 October 2022 | Jalan Besar Stadium, Jalan Besar, Singapore | Singapore | 2–1 | 2–1 | Friendly |
| 2 | 5 July 2025 | Indomilk Arena, Tangerang, Indonesia | Chinese Taipei | 1–2 | 1–2 | 2026 AFC Women's Asian Cup qualification |

== Honours ==
Arema

- Pertiwi Cup third place: 2021–22

Indonesia

- AFF Women's Cup: 2026

Individual

- Women's Liga 1 Best Young Player: 2019
