= Zahra Muzdalifah =

Indonesian footballer

Personal information
- Date of birth: 4 April 2001 (age 25)
- Place of birth: Jakarta, Indonesia
- Height: 1.63 m (5 ft 4 in)
- Position: Forward

Team information
- Current team: Dewa United Banten
- Number: 12

Youth career
- SSB Madani Meruya
- SSB Patriot Merah Putih
- ASIOP Apacinti

Senior career*
Years	Team	Apps	(Gls)
2019–2022	Persija Jakarta	4	(3)
2022–2023	South Shields	2	(1)
2023–2025	Cerezo Osaka	12	(1)
2026–	Dewa United Banten	3	(0)

International career^{‡}
2018–	Indonesia	37	(4)
- * Club domestic league appearances and goals as of 1 January 2026 ‡ National team caps and goals as of 25 January 2026

Zahra Muzdalifah (born 4 April 2001) is an Indonesian professional footballer who plays as a forward for Indonesia Women's League club Dewa United Banten and the Indonesia national team. She is widely regarded as a pioneer for Indonesian women's football for being one of the first female players from the country to play professionally in Europe and Japan.

== Early life ==
Zahra Muzdalifah was born on 4 April 2001 in Jakarta, Indonesia. She started playing football from the age of 7, after her father introduced her to the sport.

== Career ==
=== Early career ===
Zahra started her football journey by joining SSB Madani Meruya and later moved to SSB Patriot Merah Putih. In 2012, she joined the ASIOP Football Academy. At the age of 12, her performance with ASIOP earned her a spot in a competitive women's football tournament in Norway, which served as her first international exposure. Before transitioning fully to association football, she also played for the futsal team Ngapak FC and the local club Jakarta 69.

Zahra's professional breakthrough came in 2019 when she joined Persija Putri for the inaugural season of the Liga 1 Putri. She made a notable debut by scoring in a 4–1 victory against PSIS Putri at Maguwoharjo Stadium, Sleman.

=== Overseas career ===
After a brief stint with the English side South Shields in 2022, Zahra made history in July 2023 by signing with Cerezo Osaka Yanmar Ladies in the WE League, Japan's top-tier professional women's league.

During the 2024–25 season, she became the first Indonesian woman to score a goal in the Japanese professional league. She was praised for her technical adaptation to the fast-paced Japanese style of play. Zahra concluded her tenure with Cerezo Osaka in late 2025 after making 12 league appearances, citing a desire to pursue new challenges for the 2026 season.

== International career ==
Zahra has been a mainstay of the Indonesia women's national team since 2018. She was appointed as the team captain during the 2018 Asian Games at only 17 years old.

Throughout 2025, Zahra played a pivotal role in Indonesia's campaign for the **2026 AFC Women's Asian Cup qualification**. Her experience playing professionally in Japan significantly influenced the team's tactical discipline, helping Indonesia achieve a higher position in the FIFA World Rankings. As of January 2026, she remains the most-capped active player for the "Garuda Pertiwi" with 42 caps and 6 goals.

== Personal life ==
She attended Islamic Secondary School International Middle School (IISS), then proceed to the upper intermediate level at International Islamic High School. After completing her education at the senior secondary level, Zahra then continued her education at Binus University majoring in Mass Communication.

== Career statistics ==
=== International ===
As of 11 June 2024
Indonesia score listed first, score column indicates score after each Zahra goal

List of international goals scored by Zahra Muzdalifah
No.	Date	Venue	Opponent	Score	Result	Competition
1	9 July 2018	Gelora Sriwijaya Stadium, Palembang, Indonesia	Philippines	1–2	3–3	2018 AFF Women's Championship
2	16 August 2018	Gelora Sriwijaya Stadium, Palembang, Indonesia	Maldives	1–0	6–0	2018 Asian Games
3	16 August 2018	Gelora Sriwijaya Stadium, Palembang, Indonesia	Maldives	6–0	6–0	2018 Asian Games
4	11 June 2024	Al Ahli Stadium, Manama, Bahrain	Bahrain	2–0	3–0	Friendly
