= Octavianti Dwi =

Indonesian footballer

Personal information
- Full name: Octavianti Dwi Nurmalita
- Date of birth: 25 October 1998 (age 28)
- Place of birth: Yogyakarta, Indonesia
- Positions: Left-back; defensive midfielder

Team information
- Current team: Garudayaksa
- Number: 7

Senior career*
Years	Team	Apps	(Gls)
2022–2023	Persis Solo		
2023–2026	DIY (PON)		
2026–	Garudayaksa	2	(0)

International career^{‡}
2018–	Indonesia	26	(3)
- * Club domestic league appearances and goals ‡ National team caps and goals as of 9 August 2025

Octavianti Dwi Nurmalita (born 25 October 1998) is an Indonesian footballer who plays as a left-back or defensive midfielder for Indonesia Women's League club Garudayaksa and the Indonesia national team.

== Club career ==
Octavianti has played for Pertiwi DIY in Indonesia.

== International career ==
On 27 September 2021, Octavianti scored her first goal for the national team against Singapore as the winning goal in a 1–0 victory in the 2022 AFC Women's Asian Cup qualification.

Octavianti represented Indonesia at the 2022 AFC Women's Asian Cup.

On 8 June 2024, Octavianti scored her second international goal in a 3–2 victory against Bahrain in a friendly match.

== Career statis ==
=== International ===
As of 2 December 2024
Indonesia score listed first, score column indicates score after each Octavianti goal

List of international goals scored by Octavianti Dwi
No.	Date	Venue	Opponent	Score	Result	Competition
1	27 September 2021	Pamir Stadium, Dushanbe, Tajikistan	Singapore	1–0	1–0	2022 AFC Women's Asian Cup qualification
2	8 June 2024	Al Ahli Stadium, Manama, Bahrain	Bahrain	2–0	3–2	Friendly
3	2 December 2024	New Laos National Stadium, Vientiane, Laos	Singapore	3–0	3–0	2024 AFF Women's Cup

== Honours ==
Indonesia

- AFF Women's Cup: 2024
