= Ade Mustikiana =

Indonesian footballer

Personal information
- Full name: Ade Mustikiana Oktafiani
- Date of birth: 3 October 1999 (age 27)
- Place of birth: East Belitung, Indonesia
- Height: 1.69 m (5 ft 7 in)
- Position: Defender

Team information
- Current team: Bekasi City
- Number: 9

Senior career*
Years	Team	Apps	(Gls)
- Asprov Babel
2019	Arema Putri		
2026–	Bekasi City	5	(1)

International career^{‡}
2018–	Indonesia	30	(2)
- * Club domestic league appearances and goals as of 18 October 2026 ‡ National team caps and goals as of 10 October 2022.

Ade Mustikiana Oktafiani (born 3 October 1999) is an Indonesian footballer who plays a defender for Indonesia Women's League club Bekasi City, which she captains, and the Indonesia national team.

== Club career ==
Mustikiana has played for Asprov Babel in Indonesia.

== International career ==
Mustikiana represented Indonesia at the 2022 AFC Women's Asian Cup.

== Honours ==
=== Club ===
PS Bangka

- Pertiwi Cup runner-up: 2021–22

== International goals ==
No.	Date	Venue	Opponent	Score	Result	Competition
1.	11 November 2018	Faisal Al-Husseini International Stadium, Al-Ram, Palestine	Maldives	2–0	3–1	2020 AFC Women's Olympic Qualifying Tournament
2.	11 November 2018	Faisal Al-Husseini International Stadium, Al-Ram, Palestine	Maldives	3–0	3–1	2020 AFC Women's Olympic Qualifying Tournament
