= Viny Silfianus =

Indonesian footballer

Personal information
- Full name: Viny Silfianus Sunaryo
- Date of birth: 3 July 2002 (age 24)
- Place of birth: Jakarta, Indonesia
- Position: Midfielder

Team information
- Current team: Persikad Depok
- Number: 19

Senior career*
Years	Team	Apps	(Gls)
2019	Persija Putri		
2025–2026	Kelana United	14	(7)
2026–	Persikad Depok	5	(0)

International career^{‡}
2017	Indonesia U-15	3	(0)
2021–	Indonesia	34	(0)
- * Club domestic league appearances and goals as of 19 September 2025 ‡ National team caps and goals as of 9 August 2025

Viny Silfianus Sunaryo (born 3 July 2002) is an Indonesian women's footballer who plays a midfielder for Indonesia Women's League club Persikad Depok, which she captains, and the Indonesia national team.

== Club career ==
Silfianus has played for Asprov DKI Jakarta in Indonesia.

On July 10, 2025, it was officially announced that Viny Silfianus has signed with Kelana United in Malaysia National Women's League, joining fellow Indonesian Shalika Aurelia in the squad.

== International career ==
Silfianus represented Indonesia for the first time at the under-15 level and was named in the final squad for the 2017 AFF U-16 Girls' Championship held in Laos from 8–20 May 2017. She then represented the senior Indonesia women's national football team for the first time at the 2022 AFC Women's Asian Cup.

== Honours ==
Indonesia

- AFF Women's Cup: 2024, 2026
