= Shalika Aurelia =

Indonesian footballer

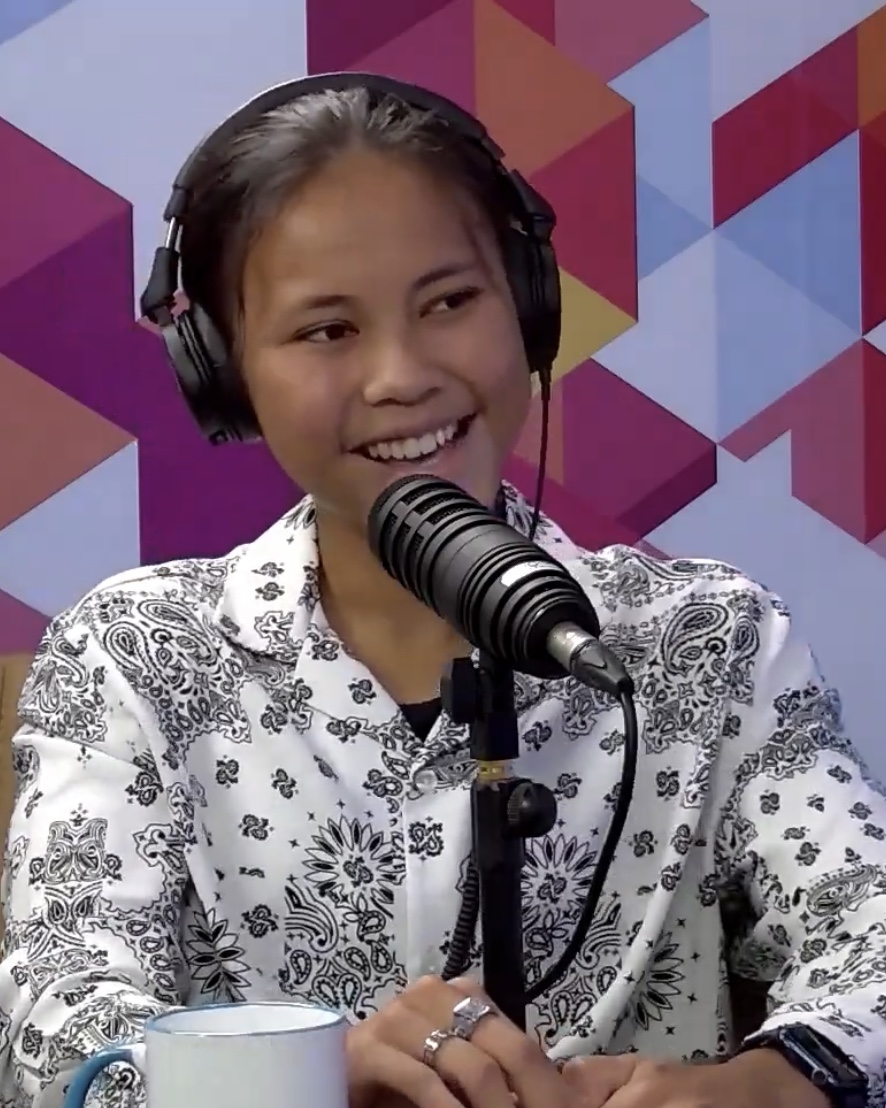
- Aurelia in 2022

Personal information
- Full name: Shalika Aurelia Viandrisa
- Date of birth: 1 August 2003 (age 23)
- Place of birth: Jakarta, Indonesia
- Height: 1.75 m (5 ft 9 in)
- Position: Centre-back

Team information
- Current team: Kelana United
- Number: 24

Youth career
- 2017–2019: SSB Astam

Senior career*
Years	Team	Apps	(Gls)
2019	Persija Jakarta	6	(0)
2022–2023	Roma CF	7	(0)
2025	Makati	7	(1)
2025–	Kelana United	9	(1)

International career^{‡}
2018	Indonesia U16	4	(0)
2019–	Indonesia	15	(0)
- * Club domestic league appearances and goals as of 19 September 2025 ‡ National team caps and goals as of 19 August 2025

Shalika Aurelia Viandrisa (born 1 August 2003) is an Indonesian footballer who plays a centre-back for Malaysia National Women's League club Kelana United and the Indonesia women's national team. She previously played for Roma and become the first Indonesian female player to sign for a club abroad.

== Early life ==
Aurelia began playing football aged 12, and played youth football for SSB Astam.

== Club career ==
Aurelia went on trial at English club West Ham United in 2019, and German club Bayern Munich in 2021.

On 10 January 2022, Aurelia joined Italian Serie B club Roma CF, becoming the first Indonesian female player to sign for a club abroad.

In 2025, Aurelia joined Makati F.C. of the PFF Women's League in the Philippines. And on July 10, 2025, it was officially announced that Shalika Aurelia Viandrisa has signed with Kelana United in Malaysia National Women's League, joining fellow Indonesian Viny Silfianus in the squad.

== International career ==
Having represented Indonesia at under-16 level, Aurelia made her debut for the senior team in 2019. She represented Jakarta at the 2021 Pekan Olahraga Nasional. Aurelia was called up for the final 2022 AFC Women's Asian Cup squad.
