= Agnes Hutapea =

Indonesian footballer (born 2000)

- Agnes with Indonesia in 2025

Personal information
- Full name: Agnes Sintauli Hutapea
- Date of birth: 14 August 2000 (age 26)
- Place of birth: Bandung, Indonesia
- Position: Defender

Team information
- Current team: Garudayaksa
- Number: 23

Youth career
- Goal Aksis Female

Senior career*
Years	Team	Apps	(Gls)
2019–2022	Persib Putri		
2023–2024	West Java (PON)		
2026–	Garudayaksa		

International career
2022–	Indonesia	12	(0)
- * Club domestic league appearances and goals

Agnes Sintauli Hutapea (born 14 August 2000) is an Indonesian footballer who plays as a defender for Indonesia Women's League club Garudayaksa and the Indonesia national team.

== Club career ==
=== Goal Aksis Female ===
Hutapea played for Goal Aksis Female, a women's football team associated with the Goal Aksis football school in Bandung. According to Lapangbola, she appeared for the team in the 2019 Women's Bandung Football League (WBFL), recording four appearances and three goals in the competition.

=== West Java ===
Hutapea subsequently represented West Java in women's football, including the province's team preparing for the 2024 National Sports Week (PON XXI). In October 2023, she played as a centre-back in two preparatory matches against East Java's women's team. In June 2024, she was reported to be playing for the West Java PON team ahead of the national competition.

At PON XXI in September 2024, West Java won the women's football gold medal. Hutapea was among the players representing the province during the competition.

== International career ==
Hutapea has represented Indonesia at senior international level. In May 2024, she was included in the national team's preparations for friendly matches against Singapore, and she was named in the squad for the matches against Bahrain in June of that year. She started in Indonesia's friendly against Singapore on 28 May 2024 and against Bahrain on 8 June 2024.

In July 2024, Hutapea was included in Indonesia's 24-player squad for two friendly matches against Hong Kong. She started as a defender in the first match on 11 July, which Indonesia lost 3–2.

Hutapea was selected for Indonesia's squad at the 2024 AFF Women's Cup in Laos. The squad advanced to the semi-finals after finishing second in Group B, with Hutapea listed among the team's defenders.

In August 2025, Hutapea was again included in Indonesia's squad for the 2025 ASEAN Women's Championship. She featured in the team's 1–1 draw against Cambodia on 12 August 2025.

== Honours ==
West Java

- PON women's football: 2024

Persib Putri

- Liga 1 Putri: 2019

Indonesia

- AFF Women's Cup: 2024
