= Remini Rumbewas =

Indonesian footballer (born 2000)

Personal information
- Full name: Remini Chere Elisabeth Rumbewas
- Date of birth: 9 October 2000 (age 26)
- Place of birth: Mamoribo, Biak Numfor, Indonesia
- Position: Centre-back

Team information
- Current team: Garudayaksa
- Number: 88

Senior career*
Years	Team	Apps	(Gls)
- Asprov Papua
2022–2023	Persis Putri		
2024–2026	Toli		
2026–	Garudayaksa	2	(0)

International career^{‡}
2022–	Indonesia	24	(2)
- * Club domestic league appearances and goals ‡ National team caps and goals as of 9 August 2025.

Remini Chere Elisabeth Rumbewas (born 9 October 2000) is an Indonesian footballer who plays as a centre-back for Indonesia Women's League club Garudayaksa, which she captains, and the Indonesia national team.

== Club career ==
=== Asprov Papua/Toli FC ===
Remini represented Asprov Papua (the Provincial Football Association of Papua) in the Pertiwi Cup with Toli FC. She played as a captain and one of the key in the team's 2021–22 Pertiwi Cup victory.

=== Persis Women ===
On 22 August 2022, new women's club Persis Women announced Remini as their player.

== International career ==
Remini represented Indonesia at the 2022 AFC Women's Asian Cup.

== International goals ==
No.	Date	Venue	Opponent	Score	Result	Competition
1.	28 May 2025	King Abdullah II Stadium, Amman, Jordan	Jordan	1–0	1–1	Friendly
2.	19 July 2026	Kuala Lumpur Stadium, Kuala Lumpur, Malaysia	Singapore	2–0	2–0	2026 AFF Women's Cup

== Honours ==
=== Club ===
Toli FC

- Pertiwi Cup: 2021–22
