= Baiq Amiatun =

Indonesian footballer

Personal information
- Full name: Baiq Amiatun Shalihah
- Date of birth: 16 July 1991 (age 35)
- Place of birth: Loyok, East Lombok, Indonesia
- Position: Forward

Team information
- Current team: Dewa United Banten
- Number: 91

Senior career*
Years	Team	Apps	(Gls)
2019–2020	TIRA-Persikabo	17	(10)
2020–2023	Persis Solo	0	(0)
2023–2026	East Nusa Tenggara (PON)	0	(0)
2026–	Dewa United Banten	6	(3)

International career^{‡}
2019–	Indonesia	17	(5)
- * Club domestic league appearances and goals ‡ National team caps and goals as of 11 June 2024.

Baiq Amiatun Shalihah (born 16 July 1991) is a Indonesian professional footballer who plays as a forward for Indonesia Women's League club Dewa United Banten and the Indonesia national team.

== Club career ==
Amiatun previously played for Persis Solo in Indonesia and currently plays for Asprov NTB.

== International career ==
Amiatun scored the sole goal against Singapore in the 2022 AFC Women's Asian Cup qualification and represented the national team at the 2022 AFC Women's Asian Cup.

On 22 & 26 February 2023, Amiatun scored in two matches against Saudi Arabia twice in a friendly matches.

== Career statistics ==
=== International ===
As of 26 February 2023
Indonesia score listed first, score column indicates score after each Baiq goal

List of international goals scored by Amiatun Amiatun
No.	Date	Venue	Opponent	Score	Result	Competition
1	9 April 2019	Bahtoo Stadium, Mandalay, Myanmar	Nepal	1–1	1–2	2020 AFC Women's Olympic Qualifying Tournament
2	20 August 2019	IPE Chonburi Stadium, Chonburi, Thailand	Cambodia	4–0	4–0	2019 AFF Women's Championship
3	4 September 2021	Pamir Stadium, Dushanbe, Tajikistan	Singapore	1–0	1–0	2022 AFC Women's Asian Cup qualification
4	22 February 2023	Prince Mohamed bin Fahd Stadium, Dammam, Saudi Arabia	Saudi Arabia	1–0	1–1	Friendly
5	26 February 2023	Prince Mohamed bin Fahd Stadium, Dammam, Saudi Arabia	Saudi Arabia	1–0	1–0	Friendly
