= Dewa United Banten F.C. (women) =

Women's association football team in Indonesia

Dewa United women's
- Full name: Dewa United Banten Football Club
- Nickname: Banten Warriors
- Short name: DUB
- Founded: 2026; 0 years ago
- Ground: Dewa United Training Ground
- President: Akira Afif
- Manager: Dhanandika
- Head coach: Dicky Firasat
- League: Indonesia Women's League
- Website: dewaunited.com
Home colours	Away colours	Third colours

Dewa United Banten Football Club, commonly referred to as Dewa United is an Indonesian professional women's football based in Serang, Indonesia. The club was founded in 2026 and plays in the Indonesia Women's League, the top women's league in Indonesia. Dewa United Women were a founding member of the Indonesia Women's League in 2026 and affiliated with Super League team Dewa United Banten.

== History ==
Dewa United Women were among the clubs announced to participate in the 2026–27 season of the Indonesia Women's League, a professional women's football competition in Indonesia. The league featured six participating clubs.

The team began their inaugural campaign on 18 October 2026 with a 1–0 victory over Persikad Depok at the Gelora Bung Karno Madya Stadium in Jakarta. Dewa United won 1–0, with Zahra Muzdalifah scoring the decisive goal to give the team a winning start to its league campaign.

The victory marked Dewa United Women's first recorded result in the Indonesia Women's League. Their opening fixture against Persikad Depok established the beginning of the club's competitive record in the new women's competition, as the team joined the five other participating clubs in the inaugural 2026–27 season.

== Players ==
=== Current squad ===
As of 18 October 2026

Note: Flags indicate national team as defined under FIFA eligibility rules; some limited exceptions apply. Players may hold more than one non-FIFA nationality.

No.	Pos.	Nation	Player
1	GK	IDN	Nilna Risqi
2	MF	IDN	Dian Khusnul
3	MF	IDN	Ayu Wulan
4	DF	IDN	Nabila Divany
5	MF	USA	Jessica Wallace
6	MF	IDN	Dinda Damayanti
7	FW	IDN	Neng Resti
8	MF	IDN	Siti Nur Sadiah
10	FW	IDN	Sheva Imut
12	MF	IDN	Zahra Muzdalifah
13	DF	IDN	Safira Ika (captain)
14	MF	IDN	Alzahna Firzalvia
15	FW	IDN	Helsya Maeisyaroh
17	MF	IDN	Febri Arum

No.	Pos.	Nation	Player
18	DF	IDN	Ratri Titannia
19	GK	IDN	Laita Masykuroh
21	DF	PUR	Imani Morlock
22	FW	IDN	Estella Loupatty
25	FW	JPN	Anna Hirakawa
26	MF	IDN	Yasni Halifah
28	DF	IDN	Soleha
29	MF	IDN	Zahra Nafisa
30	GK	IDN	Nafidza Sisco
91	FW	IDN	Baiq Amiatun
97	FW	IDN	Siti Rusdianna
—	MF	IDN	Maura Adinda
—	FW	IDN	Marcha Egis

== Season-by-season records ==
Season(s)	League	Tier	Tms.	Pos.
2026–27	Indonesia Women's League	1	6	TBD

== See also ==
- Dewa United Banten F.C.
- Indonesia women's national football team
- Indonesia Women's League
