= Safira Ika =

Indonesian footballer (born 2003)

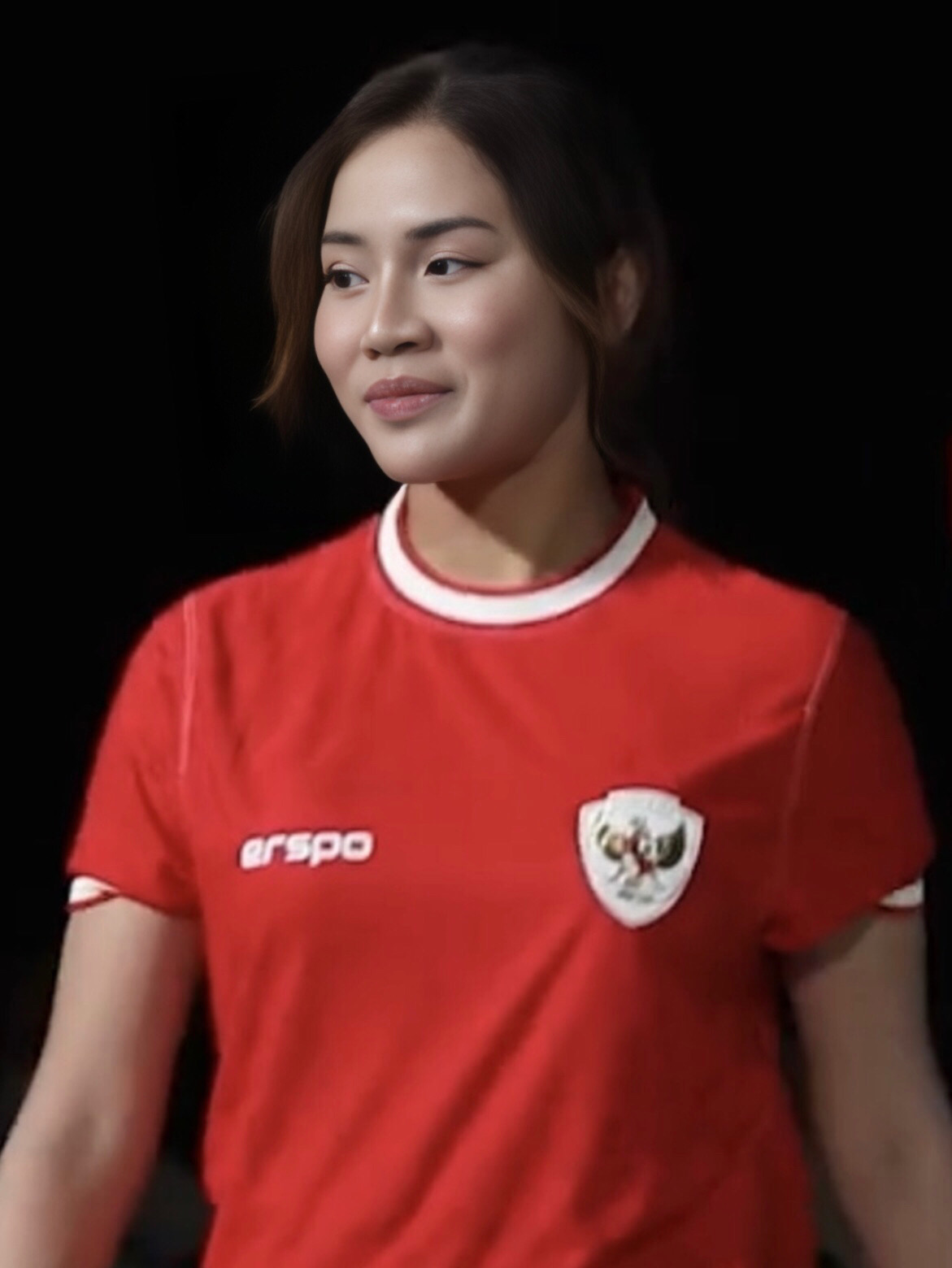
- Safira Ika with Indonesia in 2024

Personal information
- Full name: Safira Ika Putri Kartini
- Date of birth: April 21, 2003 (age 23)
- Place of birth: Bangka Belitung, Indonesia
- Position: Full-back

Team information
- Current team: Dewa United Banten
- Number: 13

Youth career
- –2019: Galanita Babel

Senior career*
Years	Team	Apps	(Gls)
2019–2020	TIRA-Persikabo		
2020–2022	Arema		
2022–2023	Persis Solo		
2024–2026	DKI Jakarta		
2026–	Dewa United Banten	5	(0)

International career^{‡}
2018	Indonesia U16	4	(1)
2018–	Indonesia	47	(1)
- * Club domestic league appearances and goals ‡ National team caps and goals as of 5 July 2025

Safira Ika Putri Kartini (born 21 April 2003) is an Indonesian professional footballer who plays as a full-back for and captains both Indonesia Women's League club Dewa United Banten and the Indonesia national team.

== Club career ==
=== Arema ===
Safira Ika signed for Women's Liga 1 club Arema Putri in November 2020. At Arema, she was the team captain and attracted a lot of attention. She reached Pertiwi Cup third place and several unofficial titles when playing for the team.

=== Persis ===
In mid 2022, Persis Solo founded their women's team. Safira Ika was among the first players the team announced in late April 2022, before their inaugural season.

== International career ==
Safira Ika represented Indonesia at the 2022 AFC Women's Asian Cup qualification.

She was chosen as the captain for the national team at the 2022 AFF Women's Championship.

On 8 June 2024, Safira Ika scored her first international goal through a free-kick in a 3–2 victory against Bahrain in a friendly match.

== Career statistics ==
=== International ===
As of match played 8 June 2024
Indonesia score listed first, score column indicates score after each Safira Ika goal

List of international goals scored by Safira Ika
No.	Date	Venue	Opponent	Score	Result	Competition
1	8 June 2024	Al Ahli Stadium, Manama, Bahrain	Bahrain	3–0	3–2	Friendly

== Honours ==
Arema

- Pertiwi Cup third place: 2021–22

Indonesia

- AFF Women's Cup: 2024, 2026

Individual

- PSSI Awards Women's Player of the Year: 2026
