= Estella Loupatty =

Indonesian footballer (born 2003)

- Loupatty with Indonesia in 2025

Personal information
- Full name: Estella Raquel Loupattij
- Date of birth: 14 November 2003 (age 23)
- Place of birth: Amsterdam, Netherlands
- Height: 1.61 m (5 ft 3 in)
- Position: Winger

Team information
- Current team: Dewa United Banten
- Number: 22

Youth career
- 2015–2018: Buitenveldert
- 2018–2022: AFC
- 2022–2023: Telstar

Senior career*
| Years | Team | Apps | (Gls) |
| 2023–2024 | Telstar | 11 | (1) |
| 2024–2025 | AFC | 32 | (3) |
| 2025 | Zulte Waregem | 3 | (0) |
| 2025–2026 | Torres | 20 | (10) |
| 2026– | Dewa United Banten | 6 | (5) |

International career^{‡}
| 2024– | Indonesia | 18 | (2) |
- * Club domestic league appearances and goals as of 21 March 2026 ‡ National team caps and goals as of 9 October 2026

Estella Raquel Loupattij (born 14 November 2003) is a professional footballer who plays as a winger for Indonesia Women's League club Dewa United Banten. Born in the Netherlands, she plays for the Indonesia.

== Early life and background ==
Loupatty was born in Amsterdam, Netherlands. Loupatty has Indonesian ancestry from her father who has Dutch-Moluccan blood. Her father's mother came from Tuhaha village in East Saparua, Central Maluku. Meanwhile, her mother has Dutch and Argentinian blood.

Loupatty did not immediately take up football as a child. When she was nine years old, Estella studied dance at school. Until the age of eleven, she was interested in trying new sports. Her father introduced her to football. Loupatty often studied basic football techniques with her father on the field near the house.

== Club career ==
Loupatty began her football career when she was 11 years in SC Buitenveldert for three seasons from 2015 to 2018.

From 2018 to 2022 she played in Amsterdamsche Vrouwen from the under-15 to senior side.

In the 2022–23 season, Loupatyy was invited by SC Telstar to play in their youth team, which she was eventually promoted to the main team in the 2023–24 season.

In the 2024–25 season she returned to play for the Amsterdamsche FC Senior team.

On 28 January 2025, Loupatty signed a contract with Belgian Women's Super League club SV Zulte Waregem.

On 5 September 2025, Loupatty moved to Serie C club Torres Calcio.

== International career ==
Loupatty has opted to represents the Indonesia women's national team. On 23 October 2024, she made her unofficial debut in a friendly match against ADO Den Haag.

== Personal life ==
Loupatty was born to a Dutch mother with Argentinian heritage, Gabriella Versteeg, born in Rotterdam, and an Indonesian father of Maluku descent, Lucas Louptattij, born in Zaandam. Her paternal grandmother, Jozephina Loupattij, was born in Larantuka, East Flores, Indonesia.

Apart from being an active footballer, Loupatty also studies sports. She also had an internship at a fitness center.

On 8 November 2024, alongside Noa Leatomu, Loupatty obtained Indonesian citizenship, making them the first naturalized female players for the Indonesia women's team.

== Career statistics ==
=== International ===
As of match played 13 October 2026

Appearances and goals by national team and year
| National team | Year | Apps | Goals |
|---|---|---|---|
| Indonesia | 2024 | 3 | 0 |
| Indonesia | 2025 | 12 | 2 |
| Indonesia | 2026 | 5 | 0 |
| Total | | 20 | 2 |

List of international goals scored by Estella Loupatty
| No. | Date | Venue | Opponent | Score | Result | Competition |
|---|---|---|---|---|---|---|
| 1 | 10 July 2026 | Kuala Lumpur Stadium, Kuala Lumpur, Malaysia | Timor-Leste | 2–0 | 2–0 | 2026 AFF Women's Cup |
| 2 | 22 July 2026 | Kuala Lumpur Stadium, Kuala Lumpur, Malaysia | Laos | 3–0 | 5–0 | 2026 AFF Women's Cup |

== Honours ==
Indonesia

- AFF Women's Cup: 2024, 2026

== See also ==
- List of Indonesia international footballers born outside Indonesia
