= Carla Bio =

Indonesian footballer

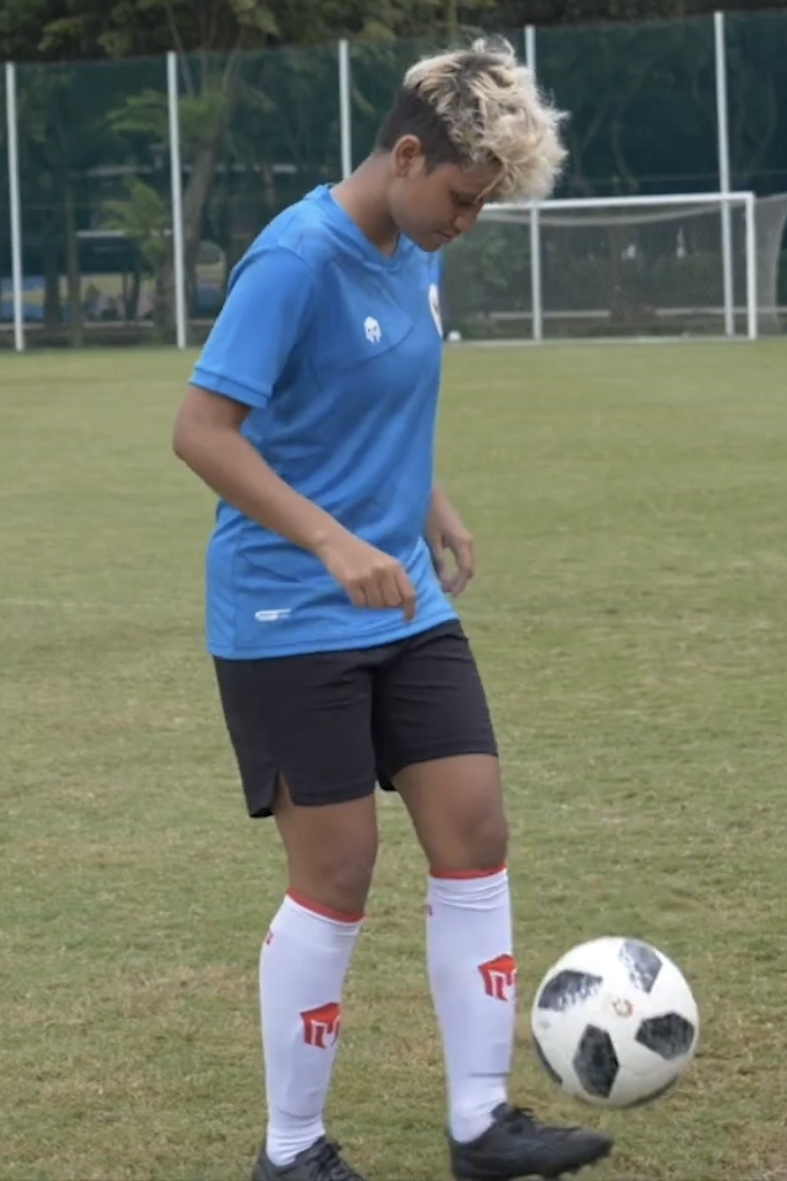
- Bio training with Indonesia in 2021

Personal information
- Full name: Carla Bio Pattinasarany
- Date of birth: 9 August 2002 (age 24)
- Place of birth: Jakarta, Indonesia
- Position: Forward

Team information
- Current team: Kuala Lumpur Rangers
- Number: 14

Senior career*
Years	Team	Apps	(Gls)
- DKI Jakarta (PON)
2025–2026	Kuala Lumpur Rangers		
2026–	S'Amuser		

International career^{‡}
2018–	Indonesia	9	(1)
- * Club domestic league appearances and goals ‡ National team caps and goals as of 27 January 2022.

Carla Bio Pattinasarany (born 9 August 2002) is an Indonesian footballer who plays a forward for S'Amuser and the Indonesia women's national team.

== Club career ==
Bio has played for Asprov DKI Jakarta in Indonesia.

== International career ==
Bio represented Indonesia at the 2022 AFC Women's Asian Cup.

== International goals ==
No.	Date	Venue	Opponent	Score	Result	Competition
1.	10 July 2022	Rizal Memorial Stadium, Manila, Philippines	Philippines	1–0	1–4	2022 AFF Women's Championship

== Honours ==
=== Club ===
PS Bangka

- Pertiwi Cup runner-up: 2021–22
