= Indomilk Arena =

Stadium in Kelapa Dua, Tangerang Regency, Banten, Indonesia

- Kelapa Dua Sports Centre Stadium
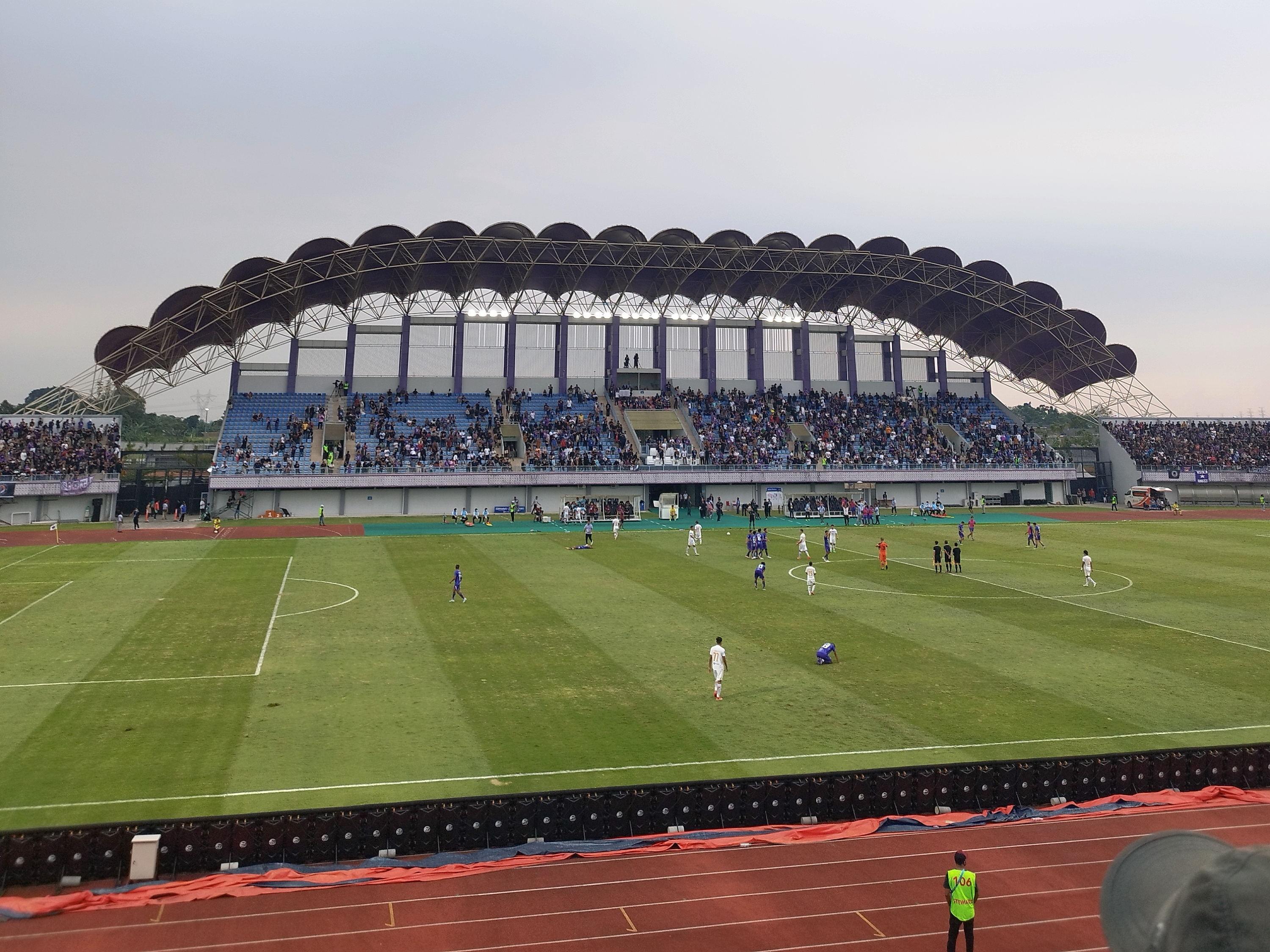

- Location in Java
- Former names: Stadion Benteng Taruna
- Location: Kelapa Dua, Tangerang Regency, Banten, Indonesia
- Coordinates: 6°15′30.9″S 106°36′15.3″E
- Owner: Government of Tangerang Regency
- Operator: Government of Tangerang Regency
- Capacity: 15,000 (Note: Capacity history: 30,000 (2014–2024), 15,000 (2024–present))
- Surface: Zoysia matrella

Construction
- Built: 2014–2018
- Opened: 2018
- Renovated: 2024

Tenant
- Persita Tangerang (2018–present)

Website
- https://sck2.id/

Indomilk Arena (formerly Benteng Taruna Stadium) or Kelapa Dua Sports Centre Stadium (for AFC competitions) is a multi-purpose stadium in Kelapa Dua, Tangerang Regency, Banten, Indonesia. It is used as the home venue for Persita Tangerang of Liga Indonesia.

The stadium's name, for sponsorship reason, is named after Indomilk, a dairy subsidiary of Indofood. For FIFA international matches, it is alternatively referred as Kelapa Dua Sports Centre Stadium due to FIFA's sponsorship policy.

== Naming ==
In 2021, Persita Tangerang officially changed the name of the Benteng Taruna Stadium to Indomilk Arena. The stadium name change was made after an agreement with their main sponsor, PT Indofood Sukses Makmur. The commercialization of the stadium name is the first in Indonesian football. In international football, the use of stadium names for commercial purposes is very common, for example, Arsenal's Emirates Stadium, Manchester City's Etihad Stadium or Bayern Munich's Allianz Arena.

Indofood itself is one of the companies that is the main sponsor for many teams in the Indonesian League. There are nine clubs that display the name Indofood on the front page of their jerseys, including Persita Tangerang.

During FIFA and AFC international competitions, where the usage of commercialized name is disallowed under current regulation, the stadium is referred as the Kelapa Dua Sports Centre Stadium. This neutralized name was first used during the 2026 AFC Women's Asian Cup qualification from 29 June – 5 July 2025.

== Facilities ==
The stadium is the main arena of Kelapa Dua Sports Centre, which consists of this stadium, a sport center/gymnasium, basketball arena, a wall for climbing, a softball and baseball field. The stadium is designed for a capacity of 30,000. The construction started in 2014 and finished in 2018, and it was renovated in 2024 to a new capacity of 15,000 with single-seat configuration.

== International matches hosted ==
Date	Tournament	Team #1	Score	Team #2
29 June 2025	2026 AFC Women's Asian Cup qualification	Chinese Taipei	8–0	Pakistan
29 June 2025	2026 AFC Women's Asian Cup qualification	Indonesia	1–0	Kyrgyzstan
2 July 2025	2026 AFC Women's Asian Cup qualification	Kyrgyzstan	0–3	Chinese Taipei
2 July 2025	2026 AFC Women's Asian Cup qualification	Pakistan	2–0	Indonesia
5 July 2025	2026 AFC Women's Asian Cup qualification	Kyrgyzstan	1–2	Pakistan
5 July 2025	2026 AFC Women's Asian Cup qualification	Chinese Taipei	2–1	Indonesia
