= Indonesia Women's League =

- Organising body: I-League
- Founded: 25 July 2019; 7 years ago
- First season: 2019
- Country: Indonesia
- Confederation: AFC
- Number of clubs: 6
- Level on pyramid: 1
- Domestic cup: Pertiwi Cup
- International cup: AFC Women's Champions League (planned)
- Current champions: Persib Putri (1st title) (2019)
- Most championships: Persib Putri (1 title)
- Broadcasters: TVRI; RANS Entertainment
- Website: Official website
- Current: 2026–27 Indonesia Women's League

The Indonesia Women's League (Indonesian: Liga Wanita Indonesia) is the top-flight women's football league in Indonesia. Supervised by the PSSI and the I-League, the league is participated by clubs who each field a team in the Super League men's league. The league's inaugural season began on 5 October 2019.

== History ==
=== Liga 1 Putri era ===
On 25 July 2019, during a general assembly meeting with all Liga 1 club representative in Jakarta, Acting Chairperson of PSSI Iwan Budianto announced the formation of the new Liga 1 Putri. From 2006, the Pertiwi Cup was Indonesia's top women's association football competition. However compared to the Liga 1 Putri, the Pertiwi Cup was contested by Indonesian provincial selection teams and not by clubs. The league was formed as a means to aid the selection of players for the Indonesian women's national team and so that the competition between boys and girls is balanced.

Ten teams out of 18 in 2019 Liga 1 teams announced their participation in the inaugural season of Liga 1 Putri: Persija, PSM, Persib, TIRA-Persikabo, Bali United, Arema, PSIS, Persipura, PSS, Persebaya. However, the Liga 1 women's competition then went on a seven-year hiatus.

=== Indonesia Women's League era ===
In July 2026, the top-flight women's competition was rebranded under the new official name Indonesia Women's League. The second season was initially planned for 2027, but the organizers brought forward the season to 17 October 2026. CEO Teddy Tjahjono projected that the Indonesia Women's League champions would qualify for the AFC Women's Champions League next season.

== Format ==
There are 6 teams in the league. In the first round, the teams play each other three times. The best four teams advance to semi-finals.

== Past winners ==
Indonesia Women's League finals
Season	Home team	Score	Away team	Venue
2019	Persib Putri	3–0	TIRA-Persikabo Kartini	Jalak Harupat Stadium, Bandung
2019	TIRA-Persikabo Kartini	1–3	Persib Putri	Pakansari Stadium, Cibinong
2019	Persib Putri won 6–1 on aggregate			

Indonesia Women's League finals (one leg)
Season	Champions	Score	Runners-up	Venue
2026–27				

== Performances ==
Team	Winners	Runners-up	Years won	Years runner-up
Persib Putri	1	0	2019	
TIRA-Persikabo Kartini	0	1		2019

== Awards ==
=== Top scorer ===
Year	Scorer	Club	Goals
2019	(Indonesia) Insyafadya Salsabillah	TIRA-Persikabo Kartini	14
2026–27			

=== Best player ===
Year	Player	Club
2019	(Indonesia) Reva Octaviani	Persib Putri
2026–27		

=== Best young player ===
Year	Player	Club
2019	(Indonesia) Helsya Maeisyaroh	TIRA-Persikabo Kartini
2026–27		

== Media coverage ==
=== Current ===
Broadcaster	Coverage	Year	Summary	Ref.
(Indonesia) TVRI	Free-to-air TV	2019–present	Live on TVRI Nasional and TVRI Sport HD.	
(Indonesia) TVRI	Streaming	2019–present	Available internationally via TVRI website and TVRI Klik app.	
(Indonesia) RANS Entertainment	Streaming	2026–present	Live on RANS Entertainment YouTube channel (free).	

=== Former ===
Year	Broadcaster		Ref.
Year	Free-to-air TV	Streaming	Ref.
2019	—N/a	(Indonesia) Mola	

== See also ==
- AFC Women's Champions League
- Super League
