= Conner Cappelletti =

Guamanian footballer and coach (born 1989)

Personal information
- Date of birth: January 17, 1989 (age 37)
- Place of birth: Kent, Washington, U.S.
- Height: 6 ft 0 in (1.83 m)
- Position: Defender

Youth career
- 2004–2006: Valley FC
- 2006–2007: Birmingham United

College career
Years	Team	Apps	(Gls)
2007–2008	Wallace State Lions		
2009–2010	Valparaiso Crusaders	19	(0)

Senior career*
Years	Team	Apps	(Gls)
2009	Indiana Invaders	16	(0)
2010	Kansas City Brass	14	(0)
2011–2012	Rocket City United		
2013	Lane United	0	(0)
Total		30+	(0+)

International career
2016	Guam	3	(0)

Managerial career
- 2017: Lane Titans (interim)
- 2017–2019: Lane Titans
- 2019: Lane United
- 2023: North Alabama SC
- * Club domestic league appearances and goals

Conner Cappelletti (born January 17, 1989) is an association football coach and former player. Previously the head coach at Lane United, Lane Community College, and North Alabama SC, he also served as assistant coach for USL League One club Richmond Kickers. Born in the United States, he represented Guam at international level, playing as a defender.

A native of Kent, Washington, Cappelletti grew up in Alabama and attended Bob Jones High School, where he was a three-sport athlete. After playing youth football with Valley FC and Birmingham United, he spent his first two years of college at Wallace State Community College before transferring to Valparaiso University. Cappelletti played while in school with Indiana Invaders and Kansas City Brass, both in the Premier Development League, and played three more years after graduating: two seasons in the National Premier Soccer League with Rocket City United and a pair of friendly matches with Lane United. Three years after ending his club career, he was called up for the first and only time by Guam, earning three caps at the 2017 EAFF E-1 Football Championship.

Cappelletti transitioned into coaching during his playing career, taking charge of youth and high school teams before taking a job as an assistant coach with Lane United following his playing retirement. In 2017, he was named the head coach at Lane Community College, and in 2019 doubled up when he was promoted to head coach at Lane United. He stepped down from both positions in November 2019.

== Early life ==
Cappelletti was born on January 17, 1989, in Kent, Washington, the son of Cap and Christi Cappelletti. As a child, he lived in Tennessee and Germany before his family settled in Madison, Alabama, ahead of his sophomore year of high school. Cappelletti was a three-sport athlete at Bob Jones High School, playing basketball, American football, and association football. He was on varsity in all three sports as both a junior and senior; with the Patriots soccer team, he was team captain and MVP and scored 15 goals during his senior season.

At club level, Cappelletti played two years with Valley FC and one year with Birmingham United. Without a Division I scholarship offer following his high school graduation, he elected to attend Wallace State Community College and play for the Lions' team in the National Junior College Athletic Association (NJCAA).

== Playing career ==
=== College and amateur ===
For two seasons, Cappelletti played college soccer at Wallace State, serving as a team captain as a sophomore. He earned NJCAA All-Region honors in both seasons, with the Lions going 15–3–0 under his leadership in 2008. Academically, he was named to the President's List in May 2009. Following his two years at Wallace State, he was recruited and received a scholarship to attend Valparaiso University and play under head coach Mike Avery. Joining Cappelletti in transferring to Valpo was his Wallace State teammate Roby Del Giudice, and the Crusaders' 2009 recruiting class also included Stefan Antonijevic.

On September 1, 2009, Cappelletti made his Division I and Valparaiso debut, starting in a 2–0 victory over Eastern Illinois. He played the full 90 minutes, anchoring a Crusader backline that allowed just four shots on target. He went on to appear in 13 matches during his junior season, including starting in all three games Valpo played that year against ranked opponents. Cappelletti was chosen to play less as a senior: he appeared in just six matches for the Crusaders. His lone start of the year came in his final collegiate game, as he played the full 90 minutes in a 2–0 victory over Detroit on November 6, 2010. Cappelletti played 19 matches over his two seasons with the Crusaders and was part of Valpo squads that earned two consecutive winning seasons for the first time in the team's history.

==== Premier Development League ====
While in college, Cappelletti spent two summers playing in the Premier Development League (PDL). Ahead of his first year at Valpo, he took the field with Indiana Invaders. In his lone season with the Invaders, Cappelletti appeared in 16 matches. He returned to the PDL ahead of his senior season with the Crusaders, this time playing with Kansas City Brass. Cappelletti appeared in 14 games for the Brass during his time with the club and trained with Major League Soccer club Kansas City Wizards.

=== Later career ===
Following his graduation from college, Cappelletti did not pursue a professional career, instead returning to Alabama. He signed on to play with National Premier Soccer League club Rocket City United, with who he would spend two seasons. While playing with Rocket City, Cappelletti also worked as a youth coach for his former youth club, Valley FC, as well as coaching at the high school level. He spent one year as the junior varsity coach at Sparkman High School and one year as the varsity head coach at James Clemens High School.

Cappelletti returned to the Pacific Northwest in 2013, joining newly-formed PDL club Lane United. Although the club did not begin league play until the 2014 season, they did play several friendly matches over the summer of 2013. Cappelletti appeared for the Reds in the first match in club history, a 3–0 defeat against Portland Timbers U23s on July 18. He did not continue as a player once the club began league play, however, and ended his club career by accepting a role as an assistant coach with Lane United. While serving with the Reds, he additionally worked as a coach for local youth club Eugene Timbers.

== International career ==
In October 2016, three years after ending his club career, Cappelletti was called up for the first time by the Guam national team for the 2017 EAFF E-1 Football Championship. Although he was in the squad as a player, Cappelletti said he was excited for the callup as a "learning tool for coaching" and that he would be able to see firsthand what coaching is like at the national team level. He made his Guamanian debut on November 6, 2016, replacing Ian Mariano at halftime of an eventual 3–2 defeat against Hong Kong. Cappelletti appeared in all three of Guam's matches at the tournament and was not called up again by the country.

== Coaching career ==
While still working as an assistant coach at Lane United, Cappelletti was named as the interim head coach at Lane Community College (LCC) on June 20, 2017. Without a formal announcement, he became the permanent head coach for the Titans before the 2017 season had begun. His first game in charge of Lane ended in a 3–2 victory over Skagit Valley on August 24. Lane finished with a 5–9–0 record in Cappelletti's first season in charge but recovered to go 6–6–3 in 2018, the program's best record since being brought back from hiatus. In 2019, the Titans led their region of the Northwest Athletic Conference (NWAC) through seven games; they ended up finishing second and qualified for the NWAC playoffs for the first time in program history. Although the Titans were defeated in the regional playoff by Everett, Cappelletti was named as the Southern Region Co-Coach of the Year.

Following the 2018 PDL season, Lane United head coach John Galas departed the club to become an assistant coach at FC Tucson; Cappelletti was promoted to become the Reds' new head coach. He became just the second head coach in club history. To fill out his staff, Cappelletti hired his youth and college teammate Chace Zanaty as an assistant and brought in former American international Nate Jaqua as strikers coach. In his first game in charge of the Reds, Cappelletti and Lane United earned a 1–1 draw against Victoria Highlanders on May 10, 2019. Lane United finished with a 5–4–5 record in Cappelletti's lone season in charge, equaling the best record in club history.

On November 20, 2019, Cappelletti resigned his positions with both LCC and Lane United. He and his fiancée moved to Ohio, where Cappelletti took a position as a coach at Cincinnati-area youth club Cincinnati United SC. He departed Lane United with a 5–4–5 record from his lone season in charge and ended his Titans tenure with a record of 16–18–9. Cappelletti spent two years at Cincinnati United, then in 2021 was hired as an assistant coach for the Western Oregon Wolves, a brand-new NCAA Division II program. He was the first assistant in program history, but left the team before it ever played a game. In 2022, Cappelletti returned to Lane United as an assistant coach while also serving as an assistant for the Willamette Bearcats men's and women's teams.

Ahead of the 2023 season, Cappelletti briefly joined North Alabama SC as the club's assistant director of coaching. Shortly after, he was named as the head coach of the senior men's team, playing in USL League Two, and as an assistant coach for the senior women's team, playing in the USL W League. However, after just one month in Alabama and without taking charge of a game, Cappelletti received a professional coaching offer and departed to become an assistant coach for USL League One club Richmond Kickers. The head coach of the Kickers, Darren Sawatzky, was the head coach of Guam when Cappelletti earned his three caps with the national team.

On 15 December 2025, the Richmond Kickers announced his departure as assistant coach.

== Career statistics ==
=== International ===
Appearances and goals by national team and year
National team	Year	Apps	Goals
Guam	2016	3	0
Total		3	0

=== Managerial ===
As of February 1, 2023

Managerial record by team and tenure
Team	From	To	Record					
Team	From	To	G	W	L	T	Win %	Ref.
Lane Titans	June 20, 2017	November 20, 2019	43	16	18	9	37.21	
Lane United	January 11, 2019	November 20, 2019	14	5	4	5	35.71	
North Alabama SC	December 30, 2022	February 1, 2023	0	0	0	0	—	
Total			57	21	22	14	36.84	

== Honors ==
=== Individual ===
- NWAC South Region Co-Coach of the Year: 2019
