= Allison Montgomery =

American politician

Representative-elect for Alabama House District 25
- Assuming office January 2027
- Succeeding: Phillip Rigsby

Personal details
- Born: 1993 or 1994 (age 32–33) Madison, Alabama, U.S.
- Party: Democratic
- Education: University of Alabama, Huntsville (BS)
- Occupation: Software engineer Politician
- Website: yourallyinmontgomery.org

Allison Montgomery is an American politician, civil rights advocate, and software engineer. A member of the Democratic Party, she was elected in the 2026 Alabama House of Representatives election to the Alabama House of Representatives' 25th District. She defeated Republican incumbent Phillip Rigsby with 53.2% of the vote to represent much of Madison, parts of Huntsville, and surrounding areas. Montgomery is a trans woman and the state's first openly transgender lawmaker.

== Early life and education ==
Montgomery was raised in Madison, Alabama. She said she is "a Madison native and lifelong resident of the Huntsville area". She is an Eagle Scout, having earned the rank through Scout Troop 350. She attended Bob Jones High School and graduated from the University of Alabama in Huntsville (UAH) in 2018 with a bachelor's in Computer Science Engineering.

== Career ==
=== Engineering career ===
Montgomery is a software engineer. She has worked as a computer software engineer supporting Redstone Arsenal, a major installation of the United States Army, near Huntsville, Alabama. In May 2026, she stated that she planned to continue working as an engineer while serving as a representative.

=== Advocacy ===
Montgomery is a volunteer for Alabama Transgender Rights Action Coalition (ALTRAC), through which she became involved with civil rights legislative advocacy in 2023, and she holds a leadership position within the group. During Alabama's 2024 legislative session, Montgomery spoke to a House Committee against Alabama's then-proposed What is a Woman Act, which ultimately passed into law in 2025. That same year she presented a statement from ALTRAC against Alabama's then-proposed House Bill 67, which would have prevented schools and libraries from presenting drag performances.

In November 2024, Montgomery organized with a trans community rally at Huntsville's Stoner Park. WAFF 48 reported that the event included "education booths, food, music and free clothes for transitioning members of the community." She stated that one of the intentions behind the event was to bring attention to the existence of transgender Alabamian citizens and to dispel of the notion that trans people are not native to Alabama. In 2026, S. Baum noted that, while many trans people from conservative U.S. states fled for more friendly environments, Montgomery was one who "stayed behind to fight for her home in Appalachia."

=== Political career ===
==== 2026 Alabama House race ====
Montgomery ran in House District 25 as a Democrat in the 2026 midterm elections. Her opponent in the Democratic primary, Damon Eubanks, endorsed her after suspending his campaign.

During her campaign, she stated that her focus was on finding solutions to issues of affordability, "smarter" budgets, improving Alabama's schools, improving the state's healthcare system, and divesting from corporate interests. She accused her opponent, Republican incumbent Phillip Rigsby, of prioritizing culture war issues and "obsess[ively]" focusing on her gender identity to distract from issues that more acutely affected citizens. She also accused Rigsby, an owner of multiple pharmacies, of participating in corrupt practices due in large part to his ties to the pharmaceutical industry. She condemned the concept of lawmakers "enrich[ing] themselves through the office" and called for "safeguards" to disincentivize and eliminate greed amongst said lawmakers.

On education, Montgomery supports repealing Alabama's CHOOSE Act, which would establish a system of school choice in Alabama; Montgomery expressed concerns that the CHOOSE Act, and the Alabamian legislators who supported it, "siphoned away" funds intended for public schools, public school students, and teachers, and that this siphoning created worse educational outcomes for Alabamian children. She also opposed AI data centers, supporting a moratorium against their development. She said AI data centers cause local strain on electricity and water supplies. Other stances she took during the campaign included support for Medicaid expansion, a statewide minimum wage, an education lottery, incentives for housing, improving transportation and energy infrastructure, and removing the grocery tax.

During her campaign, Alabama Republican Party chair Scott Stadthagen gave a speech in which he used transphobic language to target Montgomery and another trans woman running for a seat in Alabama's House of Representatives, Terri Osborne, to which Montgomery replied that she did not know Stadhagen, he did not know her, his comments were rooted in prejudice, and his comments were indicative of Stadhagen's and the Alabama Republican Party's "fail[ure] at governing," adding that citizens were less concerned about her transition than they were about high prices and affordability. Montgomery told Alabama.com, "When I'm knocking doors and talking with voters, they don't care that I'm trans, and that's not what I'm focused on either."

==== 2026 election results ====
Following the midterm elections on November 3, 2026, Montgomery defeated Rigsby with 53.2% of the vote. She was heavily outspent by her opponent in the district, which had been held by Republicans for two decades; between 2010 and 2018, the seat was unopposed by Democrats including while being held by Alabama house speaker Mac McCutcheon. Her win made her Alabama's first openly transgender lawmaker. She was one of three Democratic Party politicians to flip a seat in Northern Alabama from the Republican Party. Her win was one of several Democratic Party victories linked to that election cycle's "blue wave".

After winning the election, Montgomery also commented, "I don't really care how they treat me; I'm tough. I just wanna do right by the people I've been chosen to serve. ... I think the way we begin that relationship is to find overlap in our platforms. Maybe we can start by eliminating the grocery tax together, then move on to fully funding our public schools." She said she intended to work even for people who harbored prejudice or hatred against her "because they deserve a better Alabama as much as anyone".

== Personal life ==
Montgomery is a lifelong resident of the Huntsville area. She said she is "an Eagle Scout, and a practicing Christian, so I know what it means to serve with compassion for others". She attends local Episcopalian church services, particularly noting Huntsville's Episcopal Church of the Nativity. She listed some favorite prayers and songs on her website, including three from the 1979 Book of Common Prayer. She is transgender. She told Newsweek she had "felt a calling to be a public servant".

== See also ==
- List of transgender public officeholders in the United States
