= Madison City Schools =

School district in Alabama, United States

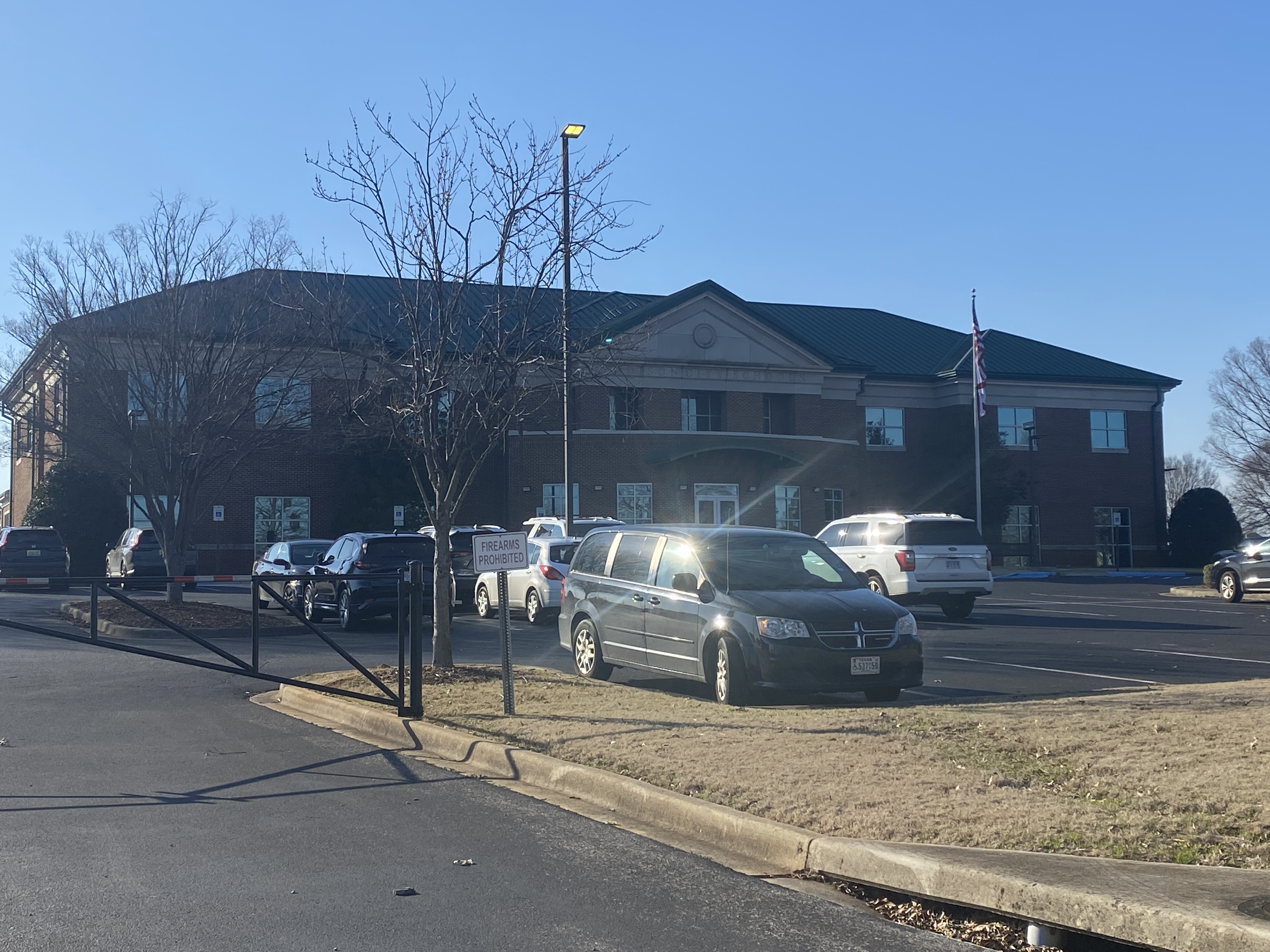

Address
- 211 Celtic Dr Madison, Alabama; United States
- Coordinates: 34.686705°N 86.745751°W

District information
- Type: Public
- Motto: Empowering all students for global success
- Established: July 1, 1998; 28 years ago

Other information
- Website: www.madisoncity.k12.al.us

Madison City Schools is a school district headquartered in and serving Madison, Alabama.

A portion of the district is in Madison County, while the rest is in Limestone County.

Madison County Schools serves most other areas in Madison County, Alabama while Huntsville City Schools serves some others.

The town of Triana is also a part of the Madison City School District.

== Schools ==
=== High schools ===
- Bob Jones High School
- James Clemens High School

=== Middle schools ===
- Discovery Middle School
- Journey Middle School
- Liberty Middle School

=== Elementary schools ===
- Columbia Elementary School
- Heritage Elementary School
- Horizon Elementary School
- Madison Elementary School
- Mill Creek Elementary School
- Rainbow Elementary School
- Midtown Elementary School
- Russell Branch Elementary School

=== Preschool ===
- West Madison Pre-K Center

==== Former ====
- West Madison Elementary School (1936–2021)
