= Irravadee Makris =

American-born Thai footballer (born 1992)

Personal information
- Date of birth: 20 January 1992 (age 34)
- Place of birth: Barrow, Alaska, U.S.
- Height: 1.63 m (5 ft 4 in)
- Position: Forward

Team information
- Current team: MH Nakhon Si Lady

Youth career
- Birmingham United
- –2010: Vestavia Hills Rebels

College career
Years	Team	Apps	(Gls)
2010–2013	Furman Paladins	74	(9)

International career
	Thailand	3+	(1+)

Irravadee "Dee" Makris (Thai: อิรวดี มาคริส; born 20 January 1992) is an American-born Thai footballer who plays as a forward for the Thailand women's national team.

== Career ==
In high school, Makris played for the Rebels of Vestavia Hills High School, where she lettered three times and won the 2007 Alabama state title. She also played for the Birmingham United youth club, where she won three consecutive Alabama state titles and was team captain, and was a five-year member of the Alabama Olympic Development Program. She later attended Furman University, and played for the Paladins from 2010 to 2013. She was included in the Southern Conference All-Freshman team, as well as the Southern Conference Academic Honor Roll, in 2010. In total, she made 74 appearances, scoring 9 goals and recording 10 assists.

Makris has appeared for the Thailand women's national team, including at the 2015 AFF Women's Championship, where she appeared against Australia U20. She was also included in Thailand's squad at the 2019 AFF Women's Championship, appearing against Singapore and Malaysia, scoring a goal against the former.

== Personal life ==
Makris is a native of Vestavia Hills, Alabama. She was born to a Thai mother, and therefore eligible to play for the Thailand women's national team.

== International goals ==
No.	Date	Location	Opponent	Score	Result	Competition	Ref.
1.	17 August 2019	IPE Chonburi Stadium 1, Chonburi, Thailand	Singapore	6–0	8–0	2019 AFF Women's Championship	
2.	25 September 2021	Faisal Al-Husseini International Stadium, Al-Ram, Palestine	Palestine	3–0	7–0	2022 AFC Women's Asian Cup qualification	
3.	25 September 2021	Faisal Al-Husseini International Stadium, Al-Ram, Palestine	Palestine	4–0	7–0	2022 AFC Women's Asian Cup qualification	
4.	25 September 2021	Faisal Al-Husseini International Stadium, Al-Ram, Palestine	Palestine	6–0	7–0	2022 AFC Women's Asian Cup qualification	
5.	24 January 2022	DY Patil Stadium, Navi Mumbai, India	Indonesia	4–0	4–0	2022 AFC Women's Asian Cup	
6.	13 May 2022	Cẩm Phả Stadium, Cẩm Phả, Vietnam	Myanmar	1–0	1–1	2021 Southeast Asian Games	
