= James Record =

American politician

James Ralph Record Sr.
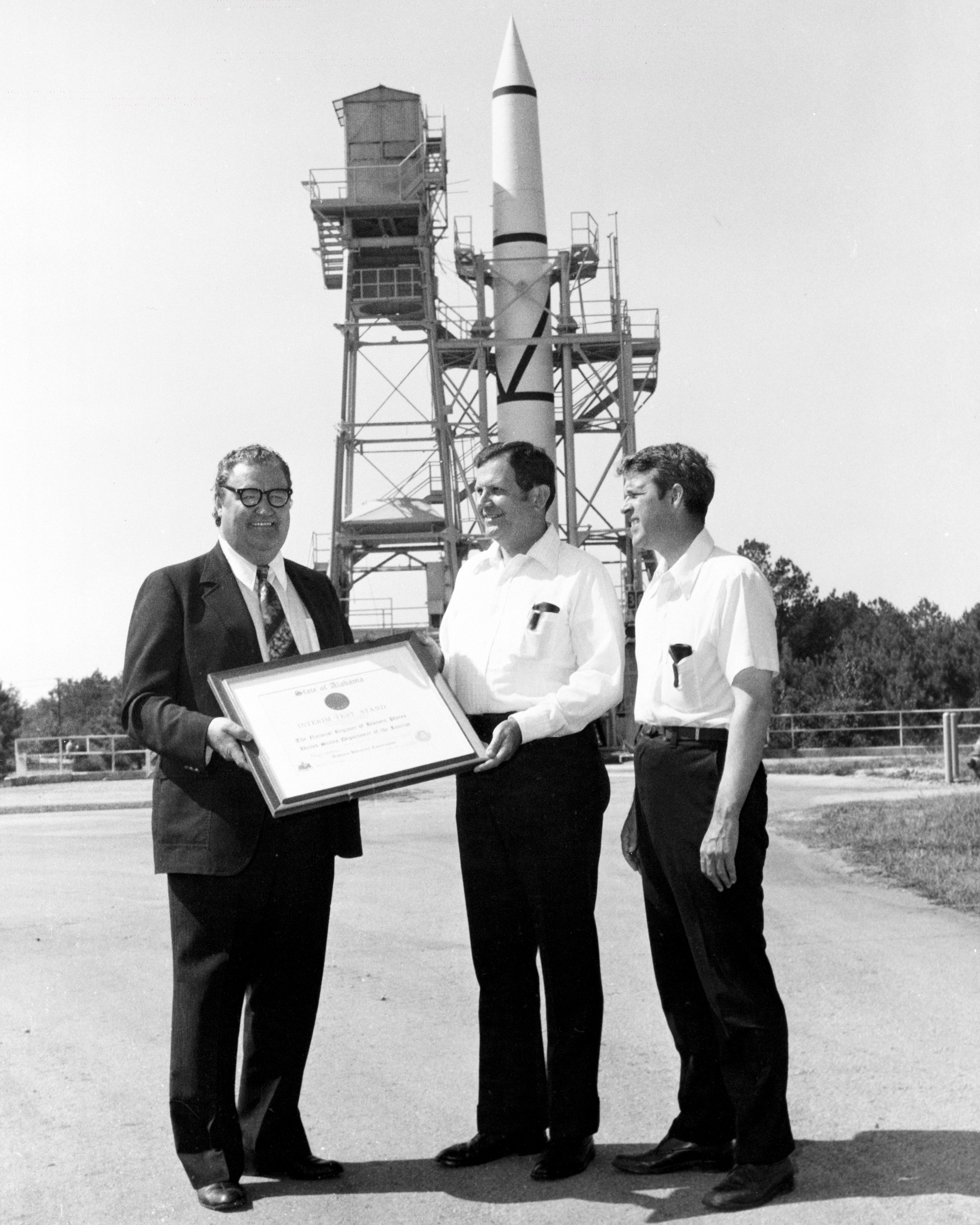
- Dr. William R. Lucas, MSFC Center Director from June 15, 1974 until July 3, 1986, as he is accepting a certificate of registration from Madison County Commission Chairman James Record, and Huntsville architect Harvie Jones.
- Born: December 27, 1918; New Market, Alabama
- Died: December 1, 1996 (aged 77); Huntsville, Alabama
- Resting place: Maple Hill Cemetery; Huntsville, Alabama
- Occupation: Politician
- Employer: Madison County, Alabama
- Spouses: Lillian Marion Ahonen (m. 1946–1962) Ruth Parker McWhorter (m. 1974)
- Children: James Record Jr (1956-); Carole D. Record (1948-)
- Parent(s): John Raymond Record; Lillie Belle (Fisk)

James Ralph Record Sr. (27 December 1918 – 1 December 1996) was an Alabama state senator, a former chairman of the Madison County (Alabama) Commission, and a noted historical author. He was born in New Market, Alabama, near the Alabama-Tennessee border. Record also served as president of several local organizations such as the Alabama Space and Rocket Center, State of Alabama Historical Commission, Madison County Historical Society, The American Legion, Veterans of Foreign Wars, Elks Lodge, Burritt Museum, YMCA, Woodmen of the World, Alabama Association of County Commissioners, First Baptist Church Huntsville, and the Madison County Mental Health Association and numerous civic organizations.

== Personal life ==
He married the former Lillian Marion Aho on June 15, 1946. They had two children, Carole D. Record and James R. Record Jr. His wife Lillian died on February 14, 1963, after a tragic accident. After raising 2 children as a single parent, Record later married the former Ruth Parker McWhorter on May 10, 1974. Record enjoyed writing history and spent much of his time writing about Madison County. He helped preserve many historical articles over the years about Madison County which are stored in the Huntsville/Madison County Library historical room. Record authored or co-authored over 10 books during his life. He graduated from Huntsville High School and later attending the University of Alabama in Huntsville obtaining a degree in accounting. Record also attended Howard College which today is known as Samford University in Birmingham Alabama. He was later presented with an honorary doctorate degree by Southeastern Institute of Technology.

== Mr. Madison County ==
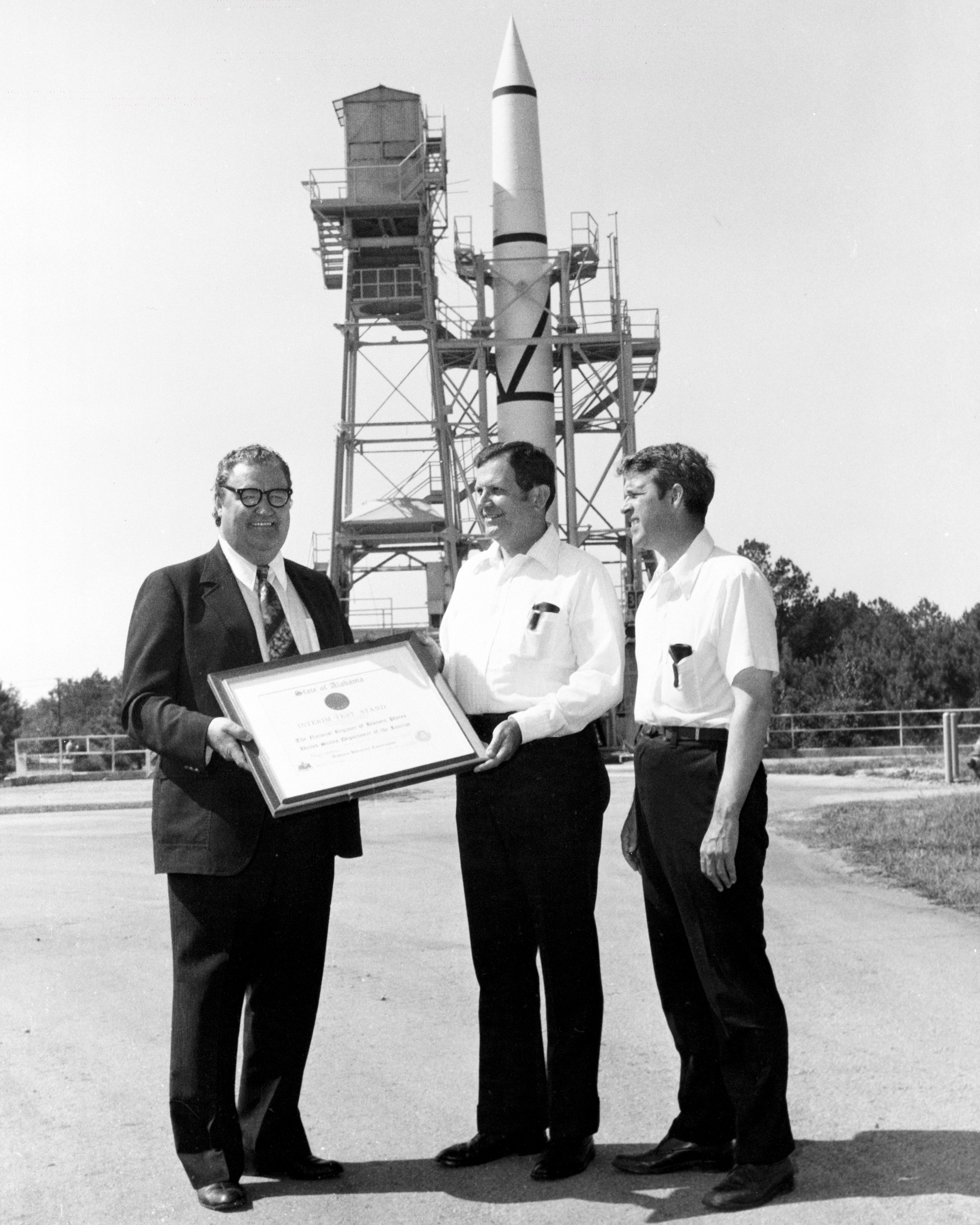
Marshall Space Flight Center director Dr. William R. Lucas accepting a certificate from Madison County Commission Chairman James Record and Huntsville architect Harvie Jones (1976)

James Record is recognized for his honest, effective leadership from the 1940s to the 1980s in the development of Madison County, Alabama. He is regarded as one of Madison County Alabama's most influential citizens. Record first served as Madison County Auditor from 1948 to 1960, State Senator 1960-1962 and then as Chairman of the Madison County Commission until 1981. Under James Record's leadership, Madison County won over 50 awards from NACO (National Association of County Officials) including the prestigious Number One County in America Award, the first #1 award for Madison County/Huntsville which are displayed in the Madison County Alabama Courthouse. Record himself also won numerous awards during his tenure, more awards than any other public official in Alabama history. Many large industries were also attracted to move to the Huntsville/Madison County area through business recruitment trips James Record made with other civic officials recruiting.

Other major achievements during James Record's tenure as chairman include establishment of county-wide water service provisioning, building of the Huntsville International Airport, county-wide road paving, county-wide garbage pickup, county-wide 911 house numbering, and the building of multiple parks such as the Madison County Nature Trail on Green Mountain in south Huntsville, Sharon Johnston Park, the Constitutional Walk at the Huntsville Botanical Garden and numerous ball parks throughout Madison county. Record was involved in most efforts to fund and build many of Huntsville's downtown civic buildings including the Huntsville/Madison County Public Library, the Von Braun Civic Center, Alabama Space and Rocket Center, Constitution Hall, Huntsville City Hall, and the Madison County courthouse. Record even implemented programs such as the braille trail for the blind at the Madison County Nature Trail so that the visually handicapped could experience the beauty of Madison County.

Record served as the fund-raising chairman for the establishment and building of the United States Space and Rocket Center. Record enlisted the help of Paul "Bear" Bryant and Ralph "Shug" Jordan and others to help raise funds to build the Space and Rocket Center. Additionally James Record worked in the Alabama Legislature to secure funding for the University of Alabama in Huntsville and to move it towards full campus status. Record worked closely with state, city, and national leaders to bring multiple major industries to Huntsville and Madison County from the 1940s until 1981. James Record understood the need for funding and often visited Washington DC with Dr. Von Braun and other civic leaders in search of funding for new projects for Madison County. In 1974, the Madison County school board planned to surprise James Record with the naming of a new high school in Madison in his honor. When Record accidentally learned of the idea, he modestly suggested that it instead be named after former U.S. representative Robert "Bob" Jones. That school in Madison Alabama is known today as Bob Jones High School because of James Record.

Record served with distinction in the US Army Air Corps during World War II and remained active in organizations, such as the VFW, American Legion, Elks and YMCA. He also founded the Madison County Military Hall of Heroes in February 1975 honoring local heroes who won military awards for heroism or valor, which can be found in the Madison County Courthouse still today. It is the only one of its kind in the United States.

In 1981 he served as Exalted Ruler of Huntsville Lodge 1648 of The Benevolent and Protective Order of Elks. In 1989, James Record was recognized as Humanitarian of the year by the Arthritis Foundation.

Record also founded the Madison County, Alabama, newspaper, The Madison County Record in 1967, a paper that is still published today.

James Record was the original chairman of the board for the Huntsville-Madison County Athletic Hall of Fame. Founded in 1989 due to the efforts of artist Vaughn Stewart, the sports hall of fame for the Madison County area tapped Record because of his knowledge of local history and many personal contacts within Madison County. Record himself was inducted into this hall of fame in 1990.

James Record was active at the First Baptist Church of Huntsville, who publicly quoted that he wanted to make Madison County, Alabama, a place to work, live, play and pray for current and future generations.

== Books and other historical writing ==
Record authored several books and other works about the history of Huntsville, Madison County, and its inhabitants. Many of his papers, photographs, and other works are now housed in the James Record Collection located in the Huntsville Heritage Room at the main location of the Huntsville/Madison County Public Library in downtown Huntsville, Alabama. Below is a selected bibliography.

- Commemorative Album Celebrating our City’s Sesquicentennial of Progress: Huntsville, Alabama, 1805-1955 - Record served as co-chairman and editor of this 1955 publication illustrating the growth of Alabama's first city into America's Rocket City.
- Huntsville, Alabama: Rocket City, U.S.A. - a 16-page pamphlet published in 1953 by Strode publishers, co-authored with John McCormick, to promote the city and provide an anecdotal history of Huntsville and Madison County.
- Dedication: Madison County Courthouse 1967 A.D. - a 39-page booklet printed in 1967 by the Hicklin Printing Co. to celebrate the dedication of the then-new courthouse in downtown Huntsville.
- A Dream Come True: The Story of Madison County and Incidentally of Alabama and the United States - published in two volumes by John Hicklin Printing Co. Volume 1 (published in 1970) covers "1492-1865, History and Our County Government." Volume 2 (published in 1978) covers "1866-1967 History," "1811-1977 Our City Government," "1798-1818 Our Territorial Government," and "1804-1977 Other Data."
- Great Elks in Madison County? You Better Believe It! - a hardcover book published in 1972 as a history of Madison County, Alabama, Elkdom.
- The Elks Move in Alabama: A History of Alabama Elks & Their Lodges - a 480-page hardcover book published in 1983 by Hicklin Printing Company about the history of the Benevolent & Protective Order of Elks fraternal organization in Alabama from 1868 to 1982.

== Memorials ==
- James Record Road, near Huntsville International Airport located off of Highway 20 just west of Wall Triana Highway, in southwest Huntsville, Alabama.
- James Record Street in Triana, Alabama.
