= Child Placing Agency Inclusion Act =

Alabamian law permitting discrimination

Child Placing Agency Inclusion Act (House Bill 24 (HB 24)) is a 2017 anti-LGBTQ law that was enacted in the U.S. state of Alabama that permits taxpayer-funded adoption agencies to deny services on the basis of religious exemptions.

== Passage ==
On April 18, 2017, the Alabama Senate passed HB 24, with 23 yeas and 9 nays. On April 18, 2017, the Alabama House of Representatives passed HB 24, with 87 yeas and 6 abstaining. On April 27, 2017, it was assigned Act No. 2017-213. On May 3, 2017, Governor Kay Ivey signed it into law. This is in the Code of Alabama under Title 26 Chapter 10D.

== See also ==
- LGBTQ rights in Alabama
- Same-sex adoption in the United States
