= Logan Stenberg =

American football player (born 1997)

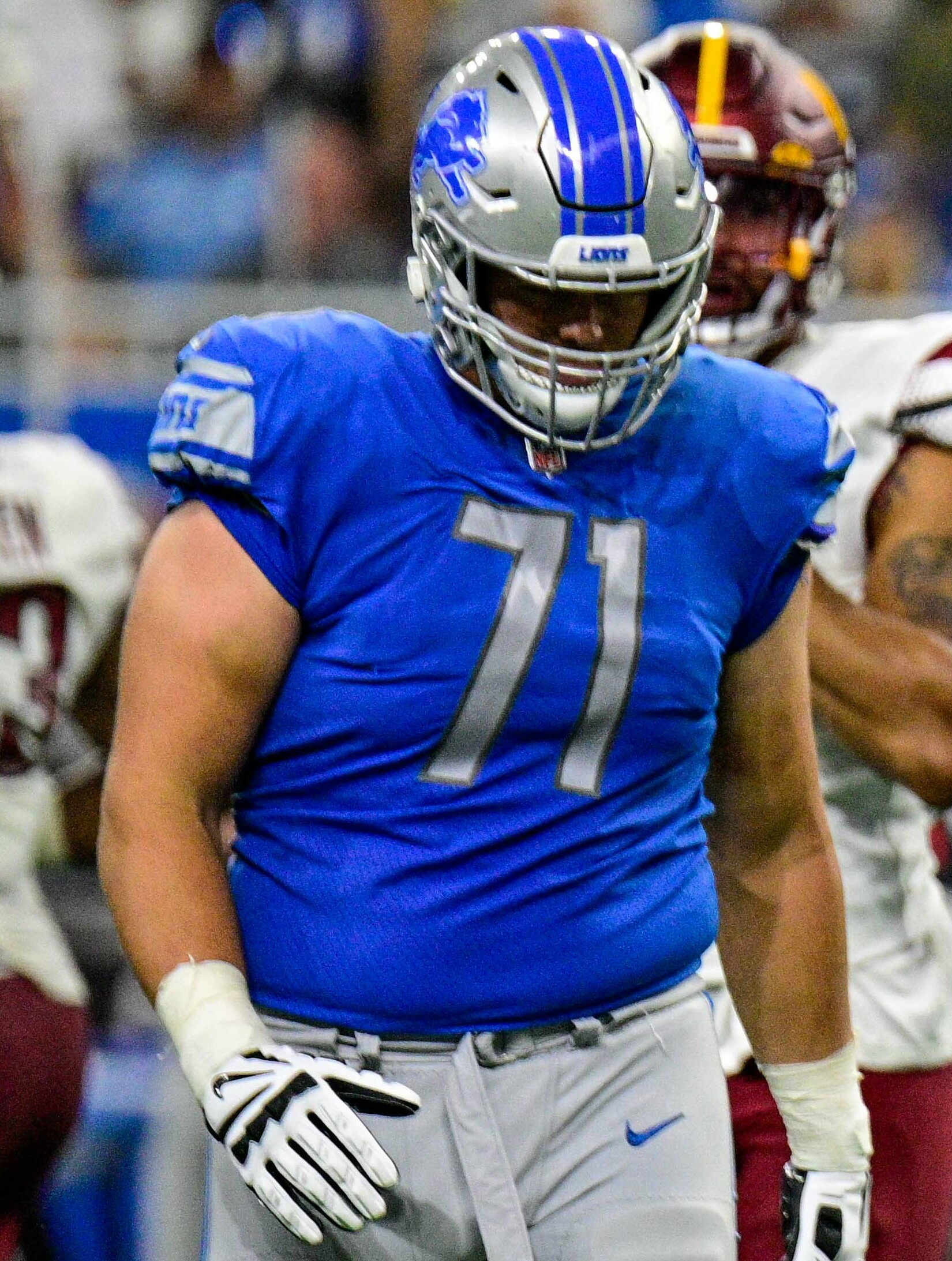
- Stenberg with the Detroit Lions in 2022

No. 61, 71
- Position: Guard

Personal information
- Born: March 18, 1997 (age 29); Madison, Alabama, U.S.
- Listed height: 6 ft 6 in (1.98 m)
- Listed weight: 312 lb (142 kg)

Career information
- High school: James Clemens (Madison)
- College: Kentucky (2015–2019)
- NFL draft: 2020: 4th round, 121st overall pick

Career history
- Detroit Lions (2020–2022); Chicago Bears (2023)*; Tampa Bay Buccaneers (2023)*
- * Offseason or practice squad member only

Awards and highlights
- First-team All-SEC (2019)

Career NFL statistics
- Games played: 25
- Games started: 4
- Stats at Pro Football Reference

Logan Stenberg (born March 18, 1997) is an American former professional football player who was a guard in the National Football League (NFL). He played college football for the Kentucky Wildcats.

== Early life ==
Stenberg grew up in Madison, Alabama, and attended James Clemens High School. He was named first-team All-State at offensive tackle as a senior. In April 2022, Stenberg married Leah-Mabry Mims.

== College career ==
Stenberg redshirted his true freshman season. He became as a starter as a redshirt freshman and started all of the Wildcats games from his redshirt sophomore season on. As a redshirt senior, Stenberg was named first-team All-Southeastern Conference by the Associated Press and a second-team All-American by the Football Writers Association of America.

== Professional career ==
Pre-draft measurables
Height	Weight	Arm length	Hand span	40-yard dash	10-yard split	20-yard split	20-yard shuttle	Three-cone drill	Vertical jump	Broad jump
6 ft 6 in (1.98 m)	317 lb (144 kg)	32 1/2 in (0.83 m)	10 1/4 in (0.26 m)	5.30 s	1.86 s	3.11 s	4.83 s	8.00 s	26.0 in (0.66 m)	8 ft 8 in (2.64 m)
All values from NFL Combine

=== Detroit Lions ===
Stenberg was selected by the Detroit Lions in the fourth round of the 2020 NFL draft. On May 22, 2020, the Lions signed Stenberg to a four-year contract.

On October 25, 2021, Stenberg was placed on injured reserve.

On August 10, 2023, Stenberg was waived by the Lions.

=== Chicago Bears ===
On August 12, 2023, Stenberg was claimed off waivers by the Chicago Bears. He was waived on August 29, 2023.

=== Tampa Bay Buccaneers ===
On September 20, 2023, Stenberg was signed to the practice squad of the Tampa Bay Buccaneers. He signed a reserve/future contract on January 23, 2024. He was released on May 13.
