= Ralph Malone =

American football player (born 1964)

Profile
- Position: Defensive end

Personal information
- Born: January 12, 1964 (age 62); Huntsville, Alabama
- Listed height: 6 ft 5 in (1.96 m)
- Listed weight: 225 lb (102 kg)

Career information
- High school: Bob Jones (Madison, Alabama)
- College: Georgia Tech
- NFL draft: 1986: undrafted

Career history
- Cleveland Browns (1986–1987)
- Stats at Pro Football Reference

Ralph D. Malone (born January 12, 1964, in Huntsville, Alabama) was a National Football League player for the Cleveland Browns from 1986 to 1987, and was on the practice roster for the Los Angeles Raiders and the Miami Dolphins from 1986 to 1989. He played collegiately for the Georgia Tech football team.

Malone is the president and CEO of Triana Industries, a manufacturer of wire harnesses and cable assemblies.
