= Clyde Foster =

American mathematician (1931–2017)

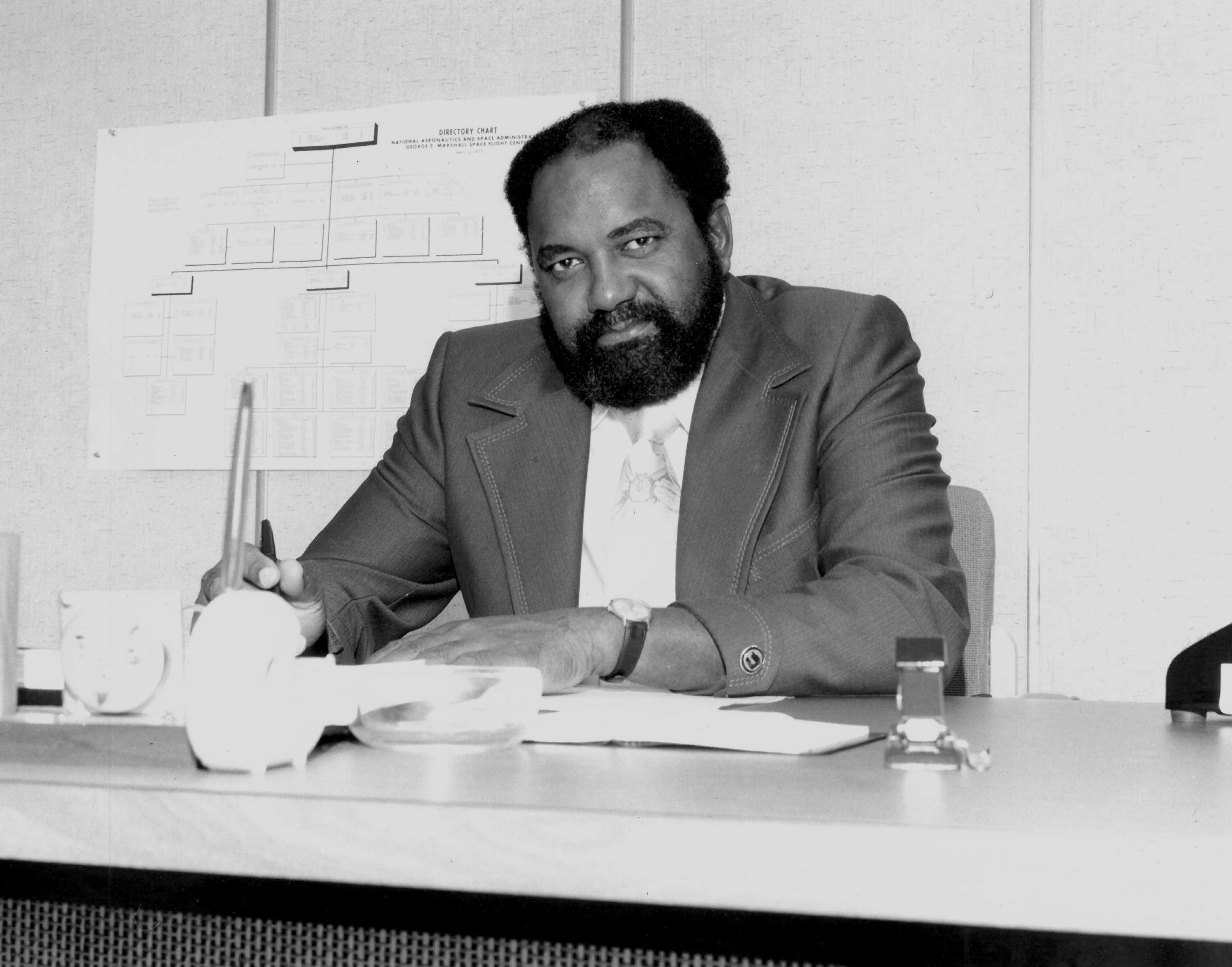
- Born: November 21, 1931; Birmingham, Alabama, U.S.
- Died: March 6, 2017 (aged 85)
- Education: Alabama A&M University
- Occupations: Scientist, civic leader
- Employer: NASA

Clyde Foster (November 21, 1931 – March 6, 2017) was an American mathematician and NASA official, mayor, educator and education administrator.

He worked for the Army Ballistic Missile Agency (which became NASA), from 1955 to 1986; working originally as a "human computer" and eventually as head of Equal Employment Opportunity at Marshall Space Flight Center in Huntsville, Alabama. Throughout the 1960s, he got more Black people NASA jobs, advanced the education of more Black computer programming students and cleared the path toward equality more enduringly than any other Black NASA employee.

He set up a training programs that allowed hundreds of African Americans to get the training necessary for positions and promotions at NASA in Huntsville, when Alabama was segregated and African Americans were denied those opportunities. He also helped establish a Computer Science degree program at his alma mater, Alabama A&M University (a historically black university) where he headed the Computer Science program while on loan from NASA. In 1981 he was awarded the Philip A. Hart Award for his "significant contribution toward improving urban and working environments".

Foster was also a community activist, and helped revive Triana, Alabama, a small, all-African American community near Huntsville. He was instrumental in the community regaining its charter, was a plaintiff in lawsuits filed over DDT pollution in Triana, and for two decades served as its mayor.

== Early life and education ==
Clyde Foster with family in his youth.

Clyde Foster was born in Birmingham, Alabama, on November 21, 1931, as the sixth child of twelve. Birmingham had spent generations mired in Jim Crow when Foster was growing up. He said there were, “Two sets of everything, one for colored and one for the white. Signs was posted on water fountains, restrooms and at that time, you could not purchase a hamburger or hotdog because there was no public facilities [that allowed blacks], including restaurants.”

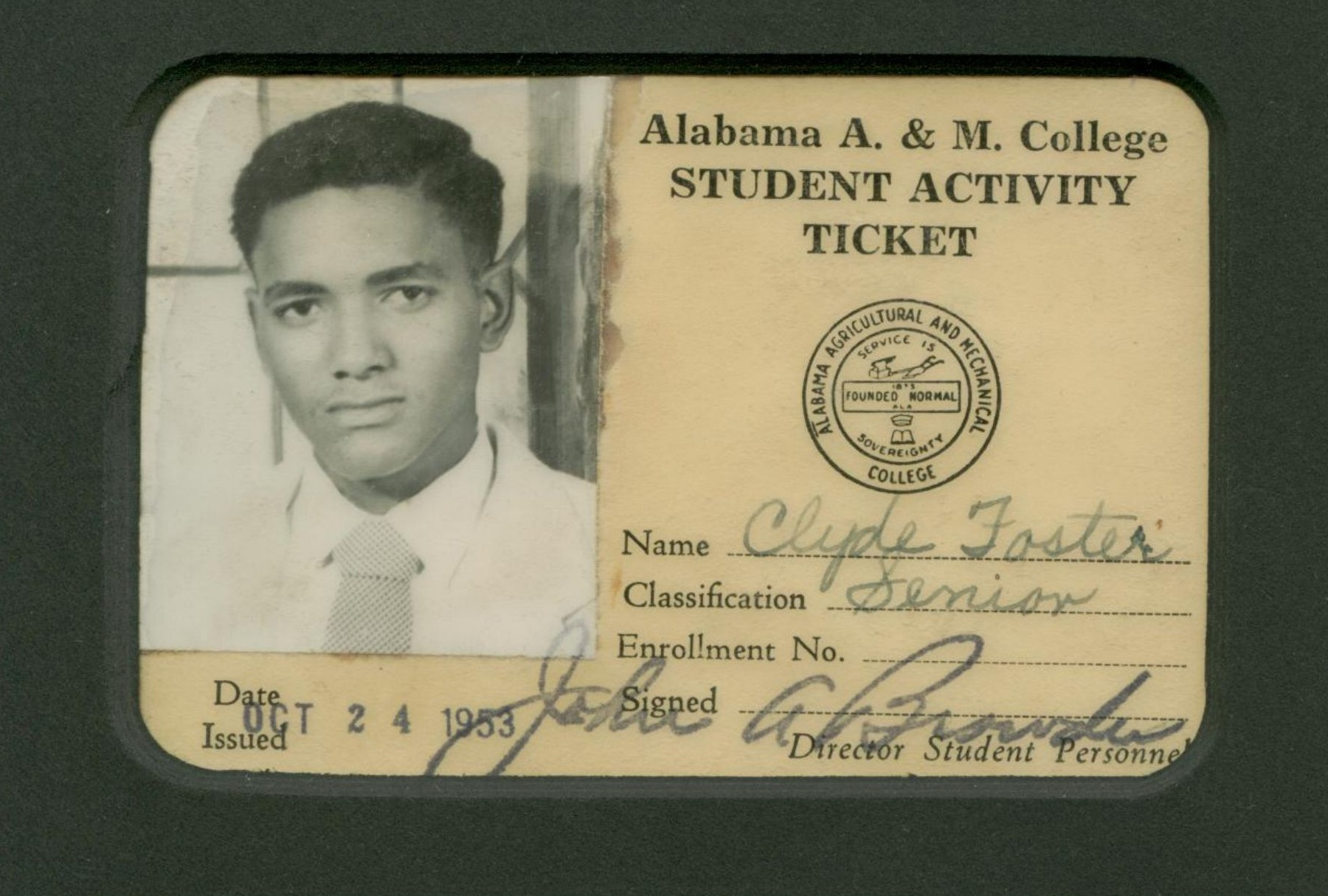
Clyde Foster's Alabama A&M University student ID card

He attended A. H. Parker High School, and as he said in a 2009 interview, “I determined at a very early age that I wanted to further my education. I told my (steelworker) father: I am not going to follow into his footsteps. He would often come home and talk about how tired he was and I told him, I said, ‘Dad, I’m going to do something different.’" He knew that college was the only way out, so he left Birmingham for Huntsville, enrolling at Alabama A&M in 1949. He received a BS degree in Mathematics and Chemistry from Alabama A&M in 1954.

Clyde Foster serving in the U.S. Army.

After serving two years in the United States Army, he moved to Selma, Alabama, and worked as a science teacher from 1956 to 1957. “I told my wife and I told my family that I was going to go down to Selma and apply for a teaching job," he said in a 2009 interview. "That was one of the things that really made my father happy. He was the most happy person in the world that he had a son -- first graduate son, out of college -- was going to become a teacher.” Foster enjoyed the work in Selma. His wife, Dorothy however was miserable. She had grown up in Huntsville and found the discrimination in Selma to be a nightmare by comparison. "She cried every day she was in Selma,” Foster said. “She would say, ‘I told you when we got married that I would follow you to the end of the earth. And then you carried me there!’”

== Heading to NASA ==
When Dorothy Foster found an application for Clyde to work at the Army Ballistic Missile Agency, at Redstone Arsenal in her hometown of Huntsville, she filled it out and sent it in. As Clyde Foster remembered, "I got a hit to come in for an interview. She shouted! She was ready to get out of there!"

Foster was one of the massive team of people who, during rocket test firings, calculated numbers from gauges set deep inside missiles and rocket engines. The gauges kept track of the missile's speed and its heat; as well as other factors like wind speed. Human computers like Foster then reduced those numbers to averages; allowing engineers to calculate how much thrust a missile had, how much wind resistance it would meet, and whether the combination would allow it to move off into space. Human computers cranked out their numbers on forty-pound gear-driven steel calculating machines. ABMA became part of NASA in 1958. In 1960, Foster and a group of colleagues were transferred to NASA's Marshall Space Flight Center, which had just been founded. Around that time Foster was considering leaving, but President John F. Kennedy's announcement that the new administration would charge NASA to go to the Moon made him stay. Foster worked regularly as a recruiter, trying to attract black workers to Marshall. He was almost universally unsuccessful. He, "found quite a few," he said, "and they just, some came in just left the next day."

If a black NASA employee wanted to move up in salary range (to become a supervisor or get a more challenging or interesting job) "there were some prerequisites," Foster said. Specifically, "more training and more education." NASA had an advanced training program. But the Agency held classes in white-only facilities. Classes were principally held in the ballrooms of Huntsville's whites-only hotels, or at the whites-only university. Foster said, "One of the things that bugged me the most," was "when you had to go off-post for a seminar or for training, because you weren't allowed in public facilities." When NASA asked Foster to train a white colleague to become his boss he finally had enough. "You feel like you are a piece of dynamite ready to explode. The only thing it takes is but a little fire -- a cigarette butt -- and light the fuse." Foster went over his supervisor's head. "I went to the officials at NASA and informed them," he said, that blacks wanted training held in places they could attend. He and Eberhard Rees, the Director of the MSFC worked out a solution. They created another separate but equal training program, held at Alabama A&M for black employees. "They would import some instructors as far away as Nashville, Tennessee, and we would tell them what kind of courses we wanted to get some training in. NASA paid those individuals to come down and do that." Thanks to Foster, close to one hundred black MSFC employees took advanced training and qualified for better jobs.

== Alabama A&M Computer Degree Program ==
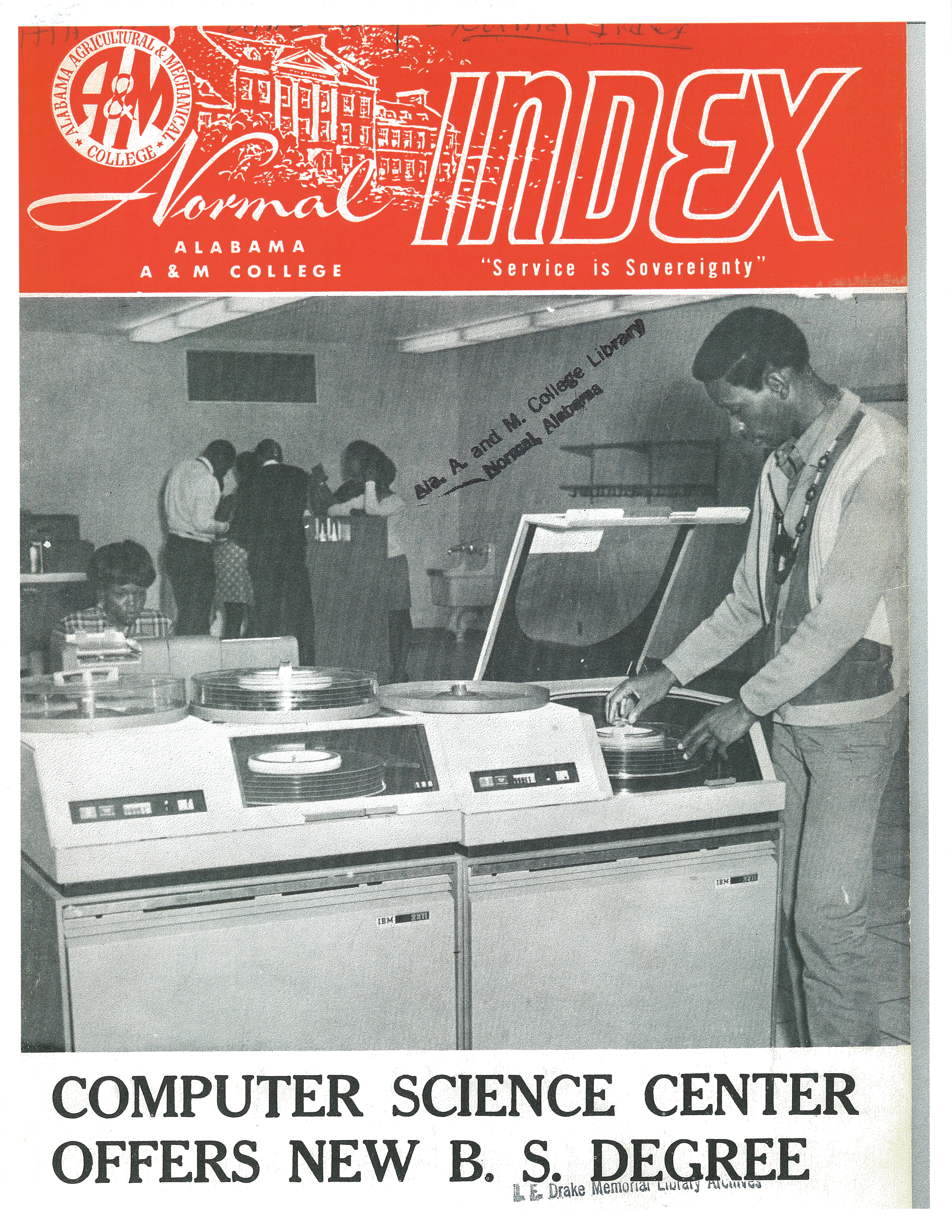
Alabama A&M Computer Science Degree Program brochure

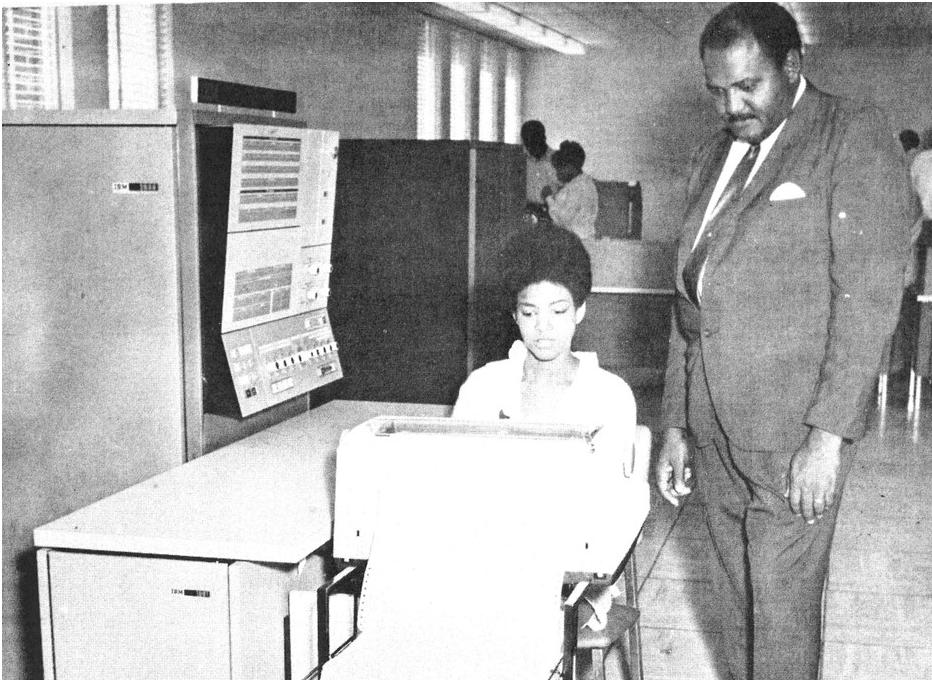
Gloria Hullett-Smith and Clyde Foster in the Alabama A&M Computer class

Through Foster's work in the computation lab, he said, "I was becoming very much computer literate," to the point where he made a name for himself in Huntsville's black community. In 1967, Dr. Walter H. Hollins, an instructor at Alabama A&M "had received a computer (from NASA) but he didn't have anyone to install it," Foster said. "He asked me if I would give him some help." In the course of doing that work, Foster got an idea: He would use his skills in computer programming to train young people in this new, emerging field so that they could get jobs at NASA. "I said, ‘Maybe this is one way we can get more (black) employees.’" He took the idea to NASA management. The agency had recently told the White House it would work directly on "the improvement of (HBCU) curriculum and faculty to provide better qualified (black) graduates for employment with NASA at Huntsville." This was a chance to do just that. Foster said, NASA "cut a deal that they would place me on loan to the university to establish a BS degree in computer sciences." This was, he said, ""the very first baccalaureate granting program [in computer science] in the state of Alabama."

As for the aim of growing a new crop of NASA employees, that worked out too. In 1964, James Jennings was majoring in math at A&M when Foster arrived to set up the computing program. He went on to work at the Space Agency for 38 years. Jennings said Foster, "kind of took me under his arms and mentored me through the process." Foster was also instrumental in Gloria Hullett-Smith coming to NASA. She made history as the first Black woman to ever run a science or engineering branch at the Marshall Space Flight Center. They are only two of the numerous other black NASA employees who got their start in the Alabama A&M Computer Science class.

In 1972, Foster joined the Equal Opportunity Office at Marshall, as a staff officer, and in 1975 he became the office's director. His job was to ensure that all the Center's operations and its contractors provided equal opportunity. In this capacity, and through the establishment of training programs, he helped hundreds of African-Americans become employed by NASA. He retired in 1986.

== Reviving Triana ==
During the years that Clyde Foster worked for NASA, he and Dorothy lived in a small, all-black unincorporated entity called Triana, Alabama. The area had no running water or flush toilets, but Dorothy Foster was happy to be back among family and back among the stories that she knew. One of those stories was about Triana itself, and it was one that Clyde just did not believe. "She was telling me that the area was [once] a city," Foster remembered. "And I said, 'You're out of your mind, girl, this isn't a city. I don't see any remnants of anything even favoring a city.' Not a stoplight, not a stop sign. And then I started talking with her father, and her father started talking about the time they had police officers, sheriffs, deputy sheriffs who were black." The story his wife and father-in-law told him was true. Triana had once been a town. Not too long after the Revolutionary War, Dorothy Foster said, "Wealthy whites bought the land in Triana and brought their slaves with them." Because Triana was near a river, there were many who believed it would "someday overtake Huntsville as northern Alabama's largest city." But the state could never rouse itself to spend money to enlarge the Huntsville Canal, and by the 1820s, "the town [began] to die."

Clyde Foster as Mayor of Triana, Alabama (c. 1966), standing with his wife, Dorothy, and an unidentified visitor holding a commemorative plaque.

Pouring through 19th century property records in the Alabama State Archives, Foster found something that astounded him. In 1819, Triana had been chartered as a city. "And I said, 'Holy mackerel'" Before the trip to the Archives, Foster had been working to get Triana running water. Town residents were "getting water out of [Indian Creek], off their roofs after rainstorms, or carrying it in barrels from distant wells." He had tried unsuccessfully to start a water authority and get the U.S. government to finance it through loans. Now, though, "when I found out this was a town, I said the easiest way to do this is: let's incorporate the town, and the town will now be eligible for some grants that you don't have to pay back." With his goal in mind, Foster raised money, hired lawyers and got townspeople to gather signatures and organize. He persevered for months until finally a judge declared that Triana was once again a town. He appointed Clyde Foster mayor, and named an all black five-member town council. They applied for the water grant and received $26,000 from the government. With that success in-hand, Foster said they obtained other grants "to build a brand-new town hall. On one side of the town hall, we had the administration such as the Council offices, fire department, jailhouse, recreation department, and then on the other side we had a day care and gymnasium, recreation for the kids. We also got paved streets, water, lights." Foster served as mayor for twenty years, from his appointment until September 1984.

== DDT in Triana ==
People in Triana not only drank from Indian Creek, they also fished in it. Birds had started dying around there in the 1960s. The bird deaths were linked that to a factory that made DDT. The plant shut down in 1970, and two years later DDT was banned. But no one in Triana knew that people were being poisoned until a reporter called Mayor Foster. Foster called the federal Centers for Disease Control who sent out a team that learned people in Triana had more DDT in their bodies than anyone in America who didn’t work in a DDT plant. When the government said the water was too contaminated to fish in, fishermen sued the company for $50 million. Mayor Foster sued them too, and in 1983 they won. Every man, woman and child in Triana got $10,000. The settlement also put aside money for medical treatment, and the company paid $231 million dollars (2026 equivalent) to clean up the Creek.

== Water Projects in Africa ==
Clyde Foster on his first trip to Nigeria.

After retiring from NASA, Foster started a number of small businesses, including one called Prep Tech. Prep Tech supported a large Chrysler automotive electronics manufacturing plant in Huntsville by cleaning containers that held parts Chrysler used in its assembly work. In the late 1980s, Prep Tech hired a young man named Victor Nnorom to do computer work. According to Foster’s daughter Edith, “As usual, Daddy has interest in different cultures and became interested in Victor’s story of his village in the Nigerian region called (Mbaise).” Nnorom told Foster about his community’s need for running water and sanitation. Foster reflected back on his work in the early days of Triana, and in 1995 headed to Africa to see how he could help. He and Dorothy ended up donating $10,000 of their own money, which paid to sink a mechanical rig borehole down to the village's 350-foot water table; line the hole with heavy-gauge PVC casing and filtration components to secure the well against ground shifting or rust; and for the purchase of a mechanical water pump to draw the subterranean water to the surface for the community compound.

== Other activities ==
With his to-be life-long friends Alonzo Toney and George Malone, in 1972 he co-founded Triana Industries, an electronics manufacturer with himself as president and 28 employees. Toney was the company vice-president and also the operations manager of the Alabama A&M Computer Services Center, and in 1984 later succeeded Foster as mayor of Triana. Malone was the general manager of Triana Industries. Foster also served on the state's Commission on Higher Education, on an appointment made in 1974 by Alabama Governor George C. Wallace. In 1981 Foster was awarded the Philip A. Hart Award for his "significant contribution toward improving urban and working environments".

Foster died on March 6, 2017.
