= Bob Jones High School =

Public secondary school in Madison, Alabama, United States

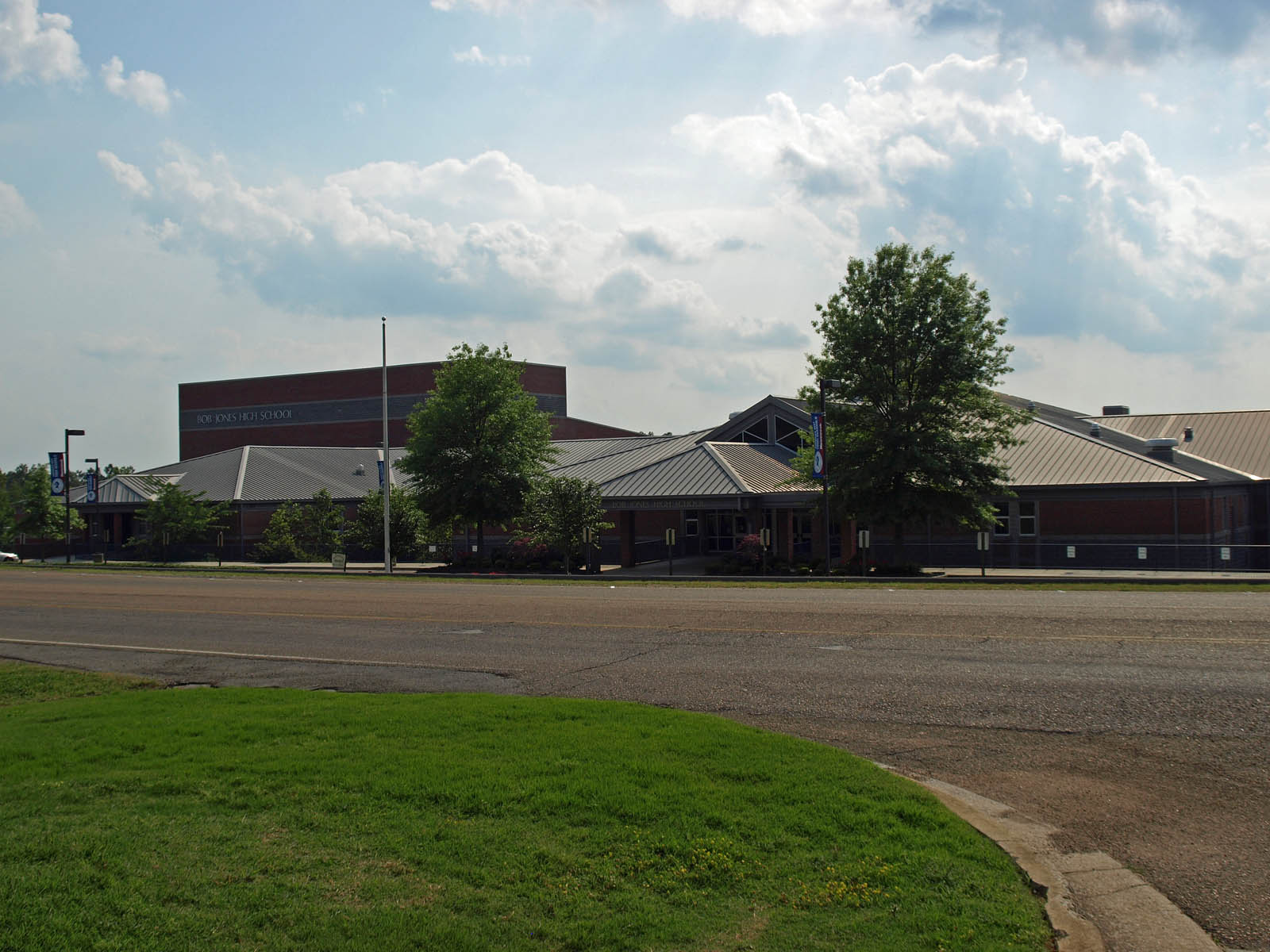
- Bob Jones High School in May 2011

Location
- 650 Hughes Road; Madison, Alabama 35758; United States; 34°43′08″N 86°44′35″W

Information
- Type: Public
- Motto: “Preparing Today For The Challenges Of Tomorrow”
- Established: 1974 (52 years ago)
- Oversight: Madison City Schools
- CEEB code: 011697
- Principal: Sylvia Lambert
- Teaching staff: 109.34 (FTE)
- Grades: 9–12
- Enrollment: 1,968 (2023–2024)
- Student to teacher ratio: 18:1
- Campus type: Suburban
- Colors: Red, white, and blue
- Mascot: Patriot
- Nickname: Patriots
- Rivals: James Clemens High School Sparkman High School
- National ranking: 6
- Publication: Eclectic vol 21
- Newspaper: Patriot Pages
- Yearbook: 'Our Story So Far..'
- Website: bjhs.madisoncity.k12.al.us

Bob Jones High School is a public high school in Madison, Alabama, United States. It is part of Madison City Schools and is named after Robert E. Jones, Jr., a former U.S. Representative from Alabama. It is not affiliated with Bob Jones University in Greenville, South Carolina

In 2007, Bob Jones High School was ranked by Newsweek in the top 5% of American High Schools. The school was ranked 1044 among the top 1200 high schools in the nation based on the number of Advanced Placement exams, Cambridge tests, and/or International Baccalaureate tests taken by the students at the school then divided by the number of graduating seniors. These students are nationally known for their scholastic aptitude, with eleven students having been selected as Presidential Scholars Program candidates in the last three years alone.

== History ==
The school was named for former Alabama congressman Robert E. "Bob" Jones. (Originally the school was to be named for James Record, the former Alabama State Senator and Madison County Commission Chairman who suggested Jones for the honor instead.) The current principal is Sylvia Lambert, and the school is in Region 4 of Class 7A in the AHSAA.

Bob Jones High School opened in 1974 at 1304 Hughes Road as a part of the Madison County School system. It remained a part of this system until 1998, when the Madison City Schools system was created.

In 1996, it moved to a new campus at 650 Hughes Road, with the original building repurposed for Discovery Middle School. Due to population growth, expansions were later added. At the time, the building did not occupy enough space, thus leaving the 9th-grade class at the middle school. When a second high school, James Clemens High School, was opened in 2012, the 9th grade was then moved back to the high school.

== Scholarships ==
The Class of 2010 broke the school record for the dollar amount of scholarships awarded. More than $32 million in scholarships was offered to about 350 students.

== Extracurricular activities ==
=== Marching band ===
The Bob Jones Marching Patriot Band earned 3rd place out of 18 schools in the Outback Bowl Marching Open Class Competition. They also won 1st place in their class and the Grand Champion title in the Parade Competition at the Outback Bowl Band Festival in Tampa, Florida. In October 2011, they became the Field Show USA Champions in Washington, D.C. In 2013, they returned to the Outback Bowl Band Festival with their show "007: The 50th Anniversary," winning Best in Class and again being named Grand Champions.

In 2024, the competition band participated in the Bands of America Grand National Championships for the first time in school history. In preliminary competition, they placed 60th overall with a score of 76.150. They did not qualify for semifinals.

In 2025, the Bob Jones Competition Marching Band participated in the Bands of America Middle Tennessee Super Regional and placed 13th in preliminary competition, making finals at a BOA super regional for the first time. They scored a 80.65 in finals, the highest score at a BOA competition ever won by the band.

=== Air Force JROTC ===
Bob Jones High School has an AFJROTC unit called the 'Blue Knights.' This unit has received the Air Force's Distinguished Unit Award for the school years 2006–2007, 2007–2008, 2008–2009, 2016–2017, and 2017–2018. The corps has over 100 cadets who support both the school and the community. They have more than 11 teams that compete at local and national levels. One of these teams is the Blue Knights Drill Team, which competed in the 2019 JROTC Open Drill Nationals in Dayton, Ohio, and placed 5th in the unarmed flight regulation drill sequence.

=== Theater Department ===
The Bob Jones Patriot Players have represented the local district and the state of Alabama numerous times in the Walter Trumbauer Secondary Theatre Competition. On multiple occasions, they have been selected to advance to the South-Eastern Theatre Conference, most recently in December of 2024 with their one-act show "Stuck With You", in which they received 3rd place.

== Athletics ==
For the 2006–2007 school year, Bob Jones athletic programs finished 6th in the Birmingham News All-Sports rankings. For the 2007–2008 school year, Bob Jones finished 4th in the All-Sports rankings.

=== Boys' basketball ===
In 2010, the boys' basketball team won the school's first-ever Boys' Basketball State Championship (6A) after a 20–14 season, beating No. 1 Homewood High School 61–45 in the finals.

=== Girls' basketball ===
In 2008, the girls' basketball team won the 6A State Championship for the first time in Birmingham, where they beat Clay-Chalkville High School. The girls' team finished with a 35–2 record and was ranked #14 in the country by ESPN In 2009, the girls' team defended their 6A State Championship by defeating Hoover High School in the finals. In 2010, the Lady Patriots were defeated by Hoover High School in the state championship. These same two teams meet in the 2011 state finals with Bob Jones prevailing, capturing their third state championship in four years.

=== Cheerleading ===
The Varsity Competition Cheerleaders are the five-time defending UCA National Champions. They won the Medium Varsity division (13-16 members) in 2006 and the Super Varsity division (21-30 members) in 2007, 2008, 2009, winning the Large Varsity division in 2010. They also won the AHSAA State Cheerleading Championship 6A division in 2003, 2004, 2005, 2006, 2008, and 2010.

=== Boys' cross-country ===
The boys' cross country team is one of the top teams in the nation, previously under the leadership of Coach Robin Gaines. He has produced Olympic medalist runners in his programs. Stephen Baker, former coach at Westminster Christian Academy and Huntsville High School, took over as head coach for the 2014 season.

=== Football ===
The 2011 team featured 5-star linebacker Reggie Ragland, who committed to play at Alabama and numerous other D-1 athletes. They were 9-0 until they ran into Hoover in the final week of the season, losing 41–13. They defeated Tuscaloosa County in the first round of the playoffs, then faced the same Hoover team, but this time at home. Bob Jones was leading 17–13 at halftime but was unable to finish them off as they lost 26–17. Bob Jones has yet to lose a region game under head coach Kevin Rose in his three years at the school.

=== Swimming ===
The boys' swim team is the defending AHSAA State Champions, and has been AHSAA State Champions 8 times since 2004. In 2014, the boys won another State Championship, led by their "Captain-by-Committee" approach. While some Captains (such as Christopher Burrows) led workouts, other Captains (including Christopher Gunner) would lead pre-meet cheers. Andrey Tretyakov (sophomore) recently achieved an Olympic Trial Time in the 100m butterfly, and has been invited to compete for a spot on the U.S. Olympic team in 2016. The girls' team became State Champions in 2007, 2022, 2023, and 2024. They received 5th place in 2014.

=== Boys' tennis ===
The boys' tennis team has been the Varsity State Doubles Champions for 3 years in a row. Most recently, in the 2022–2023 season, the Patriots won the section title for the 1st time in a decade and also placed 2nd at the AHSAA state tournament.

=== Wrestling ===
The Bob Jones Wrestling Team has placed in the Top 10 in the state for the past 11 years. Individually, wrestlers have won four State titles, 33 section championships, and had five All-Americans (Two Academic All-Americans). The team has won over 20 Tournament Championships, including three AHSAA Section Championships.

== Notable alumni ==
- Linda Burgess, WNBA player
- Tom Butler (Alabama politician), member of the Alabama Senate
- Conner Cappelletti, Guam international soccer player
- Grant Dayton, Major League Baseball pitcher who is a free agent. Won 2021 World Series with Atlanta Braves
- Zach Harting, competitive swimmer who specializes in the butterfly and freestyle events
- Robert Hoffman, actor, producer, dancer, and choreographer
- Tega Ikoba, forward for the Portland Timbers of Major League Soccer (MLS)
- Candice Storey Lee, former women's basketball player and athletic director at Vanderbilt University
- Chip Lindsey, Missouri Tigers football offensive coordinator
- Ralph Malone, former National Football League (NFL) player and current president and CEO of Triana Industries
- Allison Montgomery, politician
- Reggie Ragland, linebacker for the Cleveland Browns of the National Football League. Won Super Bowl LIV with the Kansas City Chiefs
- Kendall Randolph, CFL offensive lineman
- Levi Randolph (born 1992), basketball player for Hapoel Jerusalem of the Israeli Basketball Premier League
- Dylan Ray (born 2001), pitcher in the Arizona Diamondbacks organization for Major League Baseball
- Trey Wingenter (born 1994), pitcher in the Chicago Cubs organization for Major League Baseball
