= Sharon Johnston Park =

County park in Madison County, Alabama, U.S.

Coordinates: 34.898°N 86.442°W

Sharon Johnston Park is a county park located in north Madison County, Alabama near New Market, Alabama, about 20 minutes from downtown Huntsville, Alabama. The park project was originated and developed by former county commission chairman James Record and the Madison County Commission in the 1970s. The Commission along with the Department of Conservation and Natural Resources entered into an agreement with the Johnston family, previous owners of the park property, to dedicate Sharon Johnston Memorial Park on June 4, 1979.

The park is named in memory of Sharon Johnston, a pilot who died in 1974 at the age of 31 doing what she loved, aerobatic flying. The accident occurred September 8 at the South Weymouth (Massachusetts) Naval Air Station during an airshow that was open to the public. Her family donated the land to the community in her name because it was a place she loved dearly, where her father had built a lake, worked to conserve wildlife, and taught his children about the wonders of nature.

The park consists of over 250 acres (1.0 km^{2}) and features a 12-acre (49,000 m^{2}) fishing lake, Olympic-size swimming pool, outdoor track, soccer fields, campground facilities, picnic shelters & pavilions, and open air barbecue grills. Fishing is allowed in the lake, which is stocked with catfish, bream, bass and crappie. Numerous events such as a children's fishing tournament and a civil war reenactment are held annually at the park.

The Sharon Johnston Pool is operated each summer from the Saturday of Memorial Day Weekend through early August. The pool is open daily offering swim lessons, public swimming and a full service concession stand. It is also host to the Sharon Johnston Swim Team, the Tornadoes - the name is aptly due to the partial destruction of the Sharon Johnston Pool by a tornado in 1997.
