= Alabama House Bill 261 =

2023 law in Alabama, U.S.

Alabama Legislature
- Long title: Relating to two-year and four-year public institutions of higher education; to amend Section 16-1-52, Code of Alabama 1975, to prohibit a biological male from participating on an athletic team or sport designated for females; to prohibit a biological female from participating on an athletic team or sport designated for males; to prohibit adverse action against a public K-12 school or public two-year or four-year institution of higher education for complying with this act; to prohibit adverse action or retaliation against a student who reports a violation of this act; and to provide a remedy for any student who suffers harm or is directly deprived of an athletic opportunity as a result of a violation of this act.
- Territorial extent: Alabama
- Enacted by: Alabama House of Representatives
- Enacted: April 18, 2023
- Enacted by: Alabama Senate
- Enacted: May 3, 2023
- Signed by: Kay Ivey
- Signed: May 30, 2023

Legislative history

Initiating chamber: Alabama House of Representatives
- First reading: April 5, 2023
- Second reading: April 12, 2023
- Third reading: April 18, 2023
- Voting summary: 83 voted for; 5 voted against; 14 abstained; 3 absent

Revising chamber: Alabama Senate
- Received from the Alabama House of Representatives: April 19, 2023
- First reading: April 19, 2023
- Second reading: April 27, 2023
- Third reading: May 3, 2023
- Voting summary: 26 voted for; 4 voted against; 1 abstained; 4 absent

Final stages
- Finally passed both chambers: May 24, 2023

Summary
- Prohibits Alabamians in colleges and universities from competing in sports or on a sports team differing from their sex assigned at birth, even if the individual has undergone gender-affirming hormone therapy, with the exception of co-ed sports.
- Status: In force

Alabama House Bill 261 (HB261) is a 2023 law in the U.S. state of Alabama that prohibits colleges and universities from allowing individuals to compete in sports teams differing from their sex assigned at birth, thereby prohibiting transgender people from competing in sports aligning with their gender identity. It was signed into law by governor Kay Ivey on May 30, 2023.

House Bill 261 was an expansion upon House Bill 391, a 2021 bill which prohibited K-12 schools from allowing individuals to compete in sports differing from their sex assigned at birth. The bill was criticized by civil rights organizations, including the American Civil Liberties Union and Human Rights Campaign, for discriminating against transgender and gender non-conforming people.

== Legislative history ==
House Bill 261 was sponsored in the House by Republican representative Susan DuBose. In the Alabama House of Representatives, 14 lawmakers abstained, and 5 voted against it, with the final vote being 83-5. The Alabama Senate approved the bill in May 2023 by a vote of 26-4.

== Provisions ==
House Bill 261 prohibits individuals from competing in a sports team or league that differs from their sex as determined in state law. Individuals are identified as either male or female in the law based upon biological sex characteristics. The ban still applies to those who have undergone gender-affirming hormone therapy. The bill does not affect co-ed sports.

== See also ==
- 2020s anti-LGBTQ movement in the United States
- LGBTQ rights in Alabama
- Transgender people in sports
