= Triana, Alabama =

- Town
- Interactive map of Triana, Alabama
- Location within Alabama Location within the United States
- Coordinates: 34.587779°N 86.748488°W
- Country: United States
- State: Alabama
- County: Madison
- Incorporated: November 13, 1819
- Reincorporated: July 13, 1964

Government
  - Mayor: Mary Caudle

Area
  - Town: 2.824 sq mi (7.314 km^{2})
  - Land: 2.801 sq mi (7.255 km^{2})
  - Water: 0.023 sq mi (0.059 km^{2}) 0.81%
- Elevation: 604 ft (184 m)

Population (2020)
  - Town: 2,890
  - Estimate (2024): 4,936
  - Density: 1,030/sq mi (398/km^{2})
  - Urban: 329,066
  - Metro: 542,297
  - Combined: 913,977
- Time zone: UTC−6 (Central (CST))
  - Summer (DST): UTC−5 (CDT)
- ZIP Code: 35758
- Area code(s): 256 and 938
- FIPS code: 01-76824
- GNIS feature ID: 2406753
- Website: townoftrianaal.gov

Triana (/traɪˈænə/) is a municipality in southwest Madison County, Alabama, United States, and is included in the Huntsville–Decatur–Albertville combined statistical area. The population was 2,890 at the 2020 census, and was estimated at 4,936 in 2024.

== History ==
Triana was originally incorporated on November 13, 1819, as the second town in Madison County. It purportedly was named after Rodrigo de Triana, the crewman who first sighted land while sailing with Christopher Columbus on their first voyage to the Americas. For a time in the 19th century, it was a thriving riverport on the Tennessee River prior to the construction of the railroads. Its incorporation later lapsed and it was reincorporated on July 13, 1964, with the help of Clyde Foster, who later became Triana's mayor. Until the 2020 census, it was the only incorporated community in Madison County with a majority black population.

== Geography ==
Triana is located in southwestern Madison County at 34°35′16″N 86°44′55″W (34.587779, -86.748488), on a bluff on the north bank of the Tennessee River. It is 16 miles (26 km) southwest of the center of Huntsville. It is served by nearby Madison for education, and is a part of Madison City Schools.

According to the United States Census Bureau, the town has a total area of 2.824 square miles (7.31 km^{2}), of which 2.801 square miles (7.25 km^{2}) is land and 0.023 square miles (0.060 km^{2}) (0.81%) is water.

== Demographics ==
Triana has been one of the fastest growing areas in Alabama recently, with its growing the fastest out of all places in Alabama in the 2020 US Census.

Historical population
Census	Pop.	Note	%±
1880	146		—
1970	228		—
1980	285		25.0%
1990	499		75.1%
2000	458		−8.2%
2010	496		8.3%
2020	2,890		482.7%
2025 (est.)	5,244	▲	81.5%
U.S. Decennial Census; 2020 Census

=== Racial and ethnic composition ===
Triana, Alabama – racial and ethnic composition Note: the US Census treats Hispanic/Latino as an ethnic category. This table excludes Latinos from the racial categories and assigns them to a separate category. Hispanics/Latinos may be of any race.
Race / ethnicity (NH = non-Hispanic)	Pop. 2000	Pop. 2010	Pop. 2020	% 2000	% 2010	% 2020
White alone (NH)	52	103	1,118	11.35%	20.77%	38.69%
Black or African American alone (NH)	395	366	1,207	86.24%	73.79%	41.76%
Native American or Alaska Native alone (NH)	5	2	9	1.09%	0.40%	0.31%
Asian alone (NH)	2	0	102	0.44%	0.00%	3.53%
Pacific Islander alone (NH)	0	0	7	0.00%	0.00%	0.24%
Other race alone (NH)	0	0	18	0.00%	0.00%	0.62%
Mixed race or multiracial (NH)	3	6	200	0.66%	1.21%	6.92%
Hispanic or Latino (any race)	1	19	229	0.22%	3.83%	7.92%
Total	458	496	2,890	100.00%	100.00%	100.00%

=== 2020 census ===
As of the 2020 census, there were 2,890 people, 1,102 households, and 775 families residing in the town. The population density was 1,031.77 inhabitants per square mile (398.4/km^{2}). There were 1,180 housing units at an average density of 421.28 per square mile (162.7/km^{2}).

The median age was 33.5 years. 28.8% of residents were under the age of 18 and 7.2% of residents were 65 years of age or older. For every 100 females there were 90.1 males, and for every 100 females age 18 and over there were 86.2 males age 18 and over.

93.4% of residents lived in urban areas, while 6.6% lived in rural areas.

Of the town's households, 45.3% had children under the age of 18 living in them. Of all households, 44.3% were married-couple households, 16.0% were households with a male householder and no spouse or partner present, and 33.3% were households with a female householder and no spouse or partner present. About 23.7% of all households were made up of individuals and 6.0% had someone living alone who was 65 years of age or older. Of the 1,180 housing units, 6.6% were vacant; the homeowner vacancy rate was 1.8% and the rental vacancy rate was 3.8%.

=== 2010 census ===
As of the 2010 census, there were 496 people, 213 households, and _ families residing in the town. The population density was 397.75 inhabitants per square mile (153.6/km^{2}). There were 227 housing units at an average density of 182.04 per square mile (70.3/km^{2}). The racial makeup of the town was 21.37% White, 74.40% African American, 0.40% Native American, 0.00% Asian, 0.00% Pacific Islander, 2.42% from some other races and 1.41% from two or more races. Hispanic or Latino people of any race were 3.83% of the population.

=== 2000 census ===
As of the 2000 census, there were 458 people, 162 households, and 116 families residing in the town. The population density was 360.37 inhabitants per square mile (139.1/km^{2}). There were 176 housing units at an average density of 138.48 per square mile (53.5/km^{2}). The racial makeup of the town was 11.35% White, 86.46% African American, 1.09% Native American, 0.44% Asian, 0.00% Pacific Islander, 0.00% from some other races and 0.66% from two or more races. Hispanic or Latino people of any race were 0.22% of the population.

There were 162 households, out of which 38.3% had children under the age of 18 living with them, 35.2% were married couples living together, 34.0% had a female householder with no husband present, and 27.8% were non-families. 26.5% of all households were made up of individuals, and 6.8% had someone living alone who was 65 years of age or older. The average household size was 2.83 and the average family size was 3.44.

In the town, the population was spread out, with 33.0% under the age of 18, 10.0% from 18 to 24, 29.5% from 25 to 44, 19.2% from 45 to 64, and 8.3% who were 65 years of age or older. The median age was 31 years. For every 100 females, there were 92.4 males. For every 100 females age 18 and over, there were 79.5 males.

The median income for a household in the town was $26,250, and the median income for a family was $30,750. Males had a median income of $26,875 versus $16,538 for females. The per capita income for the town was $13,012. About 27.3% of families and 27.6% of the population were below the poverty line, including 44.6% of those under age 18 and 7.5% of those age 65 or over.

== DDT pollution ==
In 1977, the EPA issued warnings that fish and waterfowl from the Huntsville Spring Branch had shown high levels of Dichlorodiphenyltrichloroethane (DDT) in their bodies. Two years later, the EPA began to investigate how the pollutant had contaminated the water supply of the area. The findings indicated that the pollutant came from the Olin Corporation's production of the chemical on Redstone Arsenal. Lawsuits were filed against Olin Corporation by residents of Triana, as well as the United States Department of Justice. These lawsuits were eventually settled.

The water near Triana was monitored by the EPA from 1982–1995 to track the levels of DDT that was still in the Huntsville Spring Branch. During that time, the amount of DDT in the water was reduced by 97%. The EPA now considers the physical cleanup process for the site to be complete. Despite this, it is still on the Agency's Superfund list.

== Education ==
It is served by the Madison City Schools school district.
