= Alabama Senate Bill 79 =

2025 law in Alabama, U.S.

Alabama Legislature
- Long title: Relating to sex-based terminology; to amend Section 1-1-1, Code of Alabama 1975, to define certain sex-based terms; to provide policy relating to sex; to allow public entities to establish certain single-sex spaces or environments; and to require public entities that collect vital statistics related to sex as male or female to identify each individual as male or female as observed at birth.
- Territorial extent: Alabama
- Enacted by: Alabama Senate
- Enacted: February 6, 2025
- Enacted by: Alabama House of Representatives
- Enacted: February 12, 2025
- Signed by: Kay Ivey
- Signed: February 13, 2025
- Effective: October 1, 2025

Legislative history

Initiating chamber: Alabama Senate
- First reading: February 4, 2025
- Second reading: February 5, 2025
- Third reading: February 6, 2025
- Voting summary: 26 voted for; 5 voted against; 3 present not voting

Revising chamber: Alabama House of Representatives
- Received from the Alabama Senate: February 6, 2025
- First reading: February 6, 2025
- Second reading: February 11, 2025
- Third reading: February 12, 2025
- Voting summary: 77 voted for; 12 voted against; 9 abstained; 7 present not voting

Final stages
- Finally passed both chambers: February 12, 2025

Summary
- Modifies the definitions of male, female, and related terms in state law to be determined at birth based on a person's reproductive organs, and allows the state and local subdivisions to designate single-sex spaces based on the definitions of sex in state law.
- Status: In force

Alabama Senate Bill 79 (SB79), also known as the What is a Woman Act, is a 2025 law in the U.S. state of Alabama that modifies the definitions of male, female, and related terms in state law to determine gender as based on a person's reproductive organs and whether they produce or would produce sperm or ova. The bill was signed into law by governor Kay Ivey on February 13, 2025, and took effect on October 1, 2025.

The bill has been criticized for being discriminatory towards transgender, intersex, and gender-nonconforming people. During the debate of Senate Bill 79 in the House, debate was restricted to only 10 minutes, which is unusual for controversial legislation in the chamber.

== Legislative history ==
Prior to its passage, a section of the bill which banned people of the opposite sex as determined in state law from using bathrooms aligning with their gender identity was removed. Instead, it was replaced with a section which allows the state and local governments to restrict bathrooms and other spaces to that of sex. No Republicans voted against the bill in the legislature, with some Democrats opposing it.

== Provisions ==
Senate Bill 79 codifies the definitions of male, female, and other related terms in state law to be tied to that of a person's reproductive organs. It also allows the state to restrict bathrooms, changing rooms, and other generally segregated facilities to be restricted to that of sex as defined in state law, but does not outright restrict the usage of such facilities in the bill itself.

Senate Bill 79 defines two sexes in state law, male and female, and does not include exceptions for intersex people. A person's sex under the bill is determined at birth by a medical professional as either male or female. People who identify as a gender differing from their sex as defined in state law, including transgender people, are referred to in state medical registries as that sex and not by their gender.

== See also ==
- LGBTQ rights in Alabama
