= LGBTQ rights in Alabama =

- Alabama (US)
- Legal status: Legal since 2003
- Gender identity: Sex change recognized
- Military: Sexual orientation allowed since 2011; (Don't Ask, Don't Tell Repeal Act of 2010), while gender identity status is ambiguous since 2019; (Directive-type Memorandum-19-004)
- Discrimination protections: Sexual orientation covered in employment anti-discrimination laws statewide since 2020; (Bostock v. Clayton County, R.G. & G.R. Harris Funeral Homes Inc. v. Equal Employment Opportunity Commission, Altitude Express, Inc. v. Zarda) and gender identity covered in employment anti-discrimination laws statewide since 2011; (Glenn v. Brumby)

Family rights
- Recognition of relationships: Same-sex marriage since 2015; (Searcy v. Strange, Strawser v. Strange ) (Note: From February 9, 2015 to March 3, 2015, 47 of the state's 67 counties issued marriage licenses to same-sex couples. On March 3, 2015, the Alabama Supreme Court ruled in the case of Ex parte State ex rel. Alabama Policy Institute and Alabama Citizens Action Program v. King and State v. King that Alabama's ban on same-sex marriage did not violate the United States Constitution. From March 3, 2015 to June 26, 2015, Alabama's probate judges stopped issuing marriage licenses to same-sex couples or marriage licensees altogether. From June 26, 2015, to August 29, 2019, some Alabama's probate judges stopped issuing marriage licensees altogether. On August 29, 2019, the final eight counties in Alabama began issuing marriage certificates to all couples. Although unenforceable, Executive Order Number 24 by Governor Fob James, Alabama Code § 30-1-19, and Amendment 774 of the Constitution of the State of Alabama prohibits any recognition or issuance of same-sex marriage licenses, same-sex common law marriage, or a union replicating marriage.)
- Adoption: Legal since 2016; (V.L. v. E.L.)

Lesbian, gay, bisexual, transgender, and queer (LGBTQ) individuals in the U.S. state of Alabama have federal protections, but still face legal challenges and discrimination on the state level that are not experienced by non-LGBTQ residents. LGBTQ rights in Alabama—a Republican Party stronghold located in both the Deep South and greater Bible Belt—are severely limited in comparison to other states. Alabama was one of the last two states (along with neighboring Mississippi) to poll higher opposition to same-sex marriage than support. However, since at least 2022, more Alabamians support same-sex marriage than oppose the practice. Same-sex sexual activity in Alabama was legalized in accordance with the 2003 Lawrence v. Texas decision. The state's sodomy ban was subsequently repealed in 2019; making it the first state on the Gulf Coast to codify same-sex sexual activity into state law.

== Law regarding same-sex sexual activity ==
Same-sex sexual activity has been legal in Alabama since 2003, when the United States Supreme Court decision in Lawrence v. Texas struck down all state sodomy laws. On May 23, 2019, the Alabama House of Representatives passed, with 101 voting yes and 3 absent, Alabama Senate Bill 320, which repeals the ban on "deviate sexual intercourse". On May 28, 2019, the Alabama State Senate passed Alabama Senate Bill 320, with 32 yea and 3 absent. The bill took effect on September 1, 2019.

The age of consent in Alabama is 16 years old; however, sexual contact is legal with someone under 16 years and within 2 years of the older individual. In 2019, this provision was extended to members of the same sex. It had previously only been allowed for individuals of the opposite sex. A few other US states still keep these types of age-of-consent clauses, exclusively applying them to individuals of opposite sexes.

== Recognition of same-sex relationships ==
On June 26, 2015, the U.S. Supreme Court's ruling in Obergefell v. Hodges made same-sex marriage legal nationwide. However, not all counties immediately complied, and instead they copied behavior from the civil rights era when they had refused to perform interracial marriages. By 2017, eight counties were still protesting by refusing to issue any marriage licenses at all.

In May 2019, the Alabama Legislature decided counties were required to record marriage certificates. On August 29, 2019, all Alabama counties began recording marriage certificates for all couples (including interracial and same-sex couples).

Previously, Alabama had banned the licensing of same-sex marriages and the recognition of such marriages from other jurisdictions by executive order in 1996, by statute in 1998, and by constitutional amendment in June 2006. There are still some legal prohibitions on same-sex marriage, but they are unenforceable. They are: Executive Order Number 24 by Governor Fob James, Alabama Code § 30-1-19, and Amendment 774 of the Constitution of the State of Alabama.

== Adoption rights and parenting ==
Alabama permits adoption by same-sex couples.

Sexual orientation has sometimes been used as a reason to deny parents' rights. In 2002, the Supreme Court of Alabama ruled that

"the homosexual conduct of a parent — conduct involving a sexual relationship between two persons of the same gender — creates a strong presumption of unfitness that alone is sufficient justification for denying that parent custody of his or her own children or prohibiting the adoption of the children of others. ... Homosexual conduct is, and has been, considered abhorrent, immoral, detestable, a crime against nature, and a violation of the laws of nature and of nature's God upon which this Nation and our laws are predicated. Such conduct violates both the criminal and civil laws of this State and is destructive to a basic building block of society — the family. The law of Alabama is not only clear in its condemning such conduct, but the courts of this State have consistently held that exposing a child to such behavior has a destructive and seriously detrimental effect on the children. It is an inherent evil against which children must be protected."

However, the following year, the U.S. Supreme Court said in Lawrence v. Texas that states could not ban same-sex sexual activity.

=== Child Placing Agency Inclusion Act ===
Alabama is one of the few states to have a law protecting the right of faith-based adoption agencies to refuse to place a child with a certain couple or individual due to the agency's religious beliefs. The law was signed by Governor Kay Ivey in May 2017.

=== Fertility assistance ===
In February 2024, the Alabama Supreme Court ruled that embryos have the legal status of children. Justice Gregory Cook dissented, predicting that "the creation of frozen embryos will end in Alabama" due to the court's ruling. Cook explained: "No rational medical provider would continue to provide services for creating and maintaining frozen embryos knowing that they must continue to maintain such frozen embryos forever or risk the penalty of a Wrongful Death Act claim for punitive damages."

== Discrimination protections ==
=== Federal law ===
Since 2011, gender identity has been applied to the definition of sex in Title VII of the Civil Rights Act of 1964 within the jurisdiction of the United States Court of Appeals for the Eleventh Circuit. Since 2020, sexual orientation has been applied to the definition of sex in Title VII of the Civil Rights Act of 1964.

=== State level ===
Alabama state law does not address discrimination based on sexual orientation and gender identity in employment, housing, discrimination in public accommodations, addresses harassment and/or bullying of students, and discrimination against students. The state law has neither a ban on insurance exclusions for transgender healthcare nor does it provide transgender-inclusive health benefits to state employees. However, in 2022, it became a felony for a medical provider to give gender-affirming care to a minor.

=== Local level ===
The city of Birmingham prohibits all discrimination on the basis of sexual orientation and gender identity. It approved such protections in September 2017. The city of Montevallo passed a similar non-discrimination ordinance in April 2018, becoming the second city in the state to have such protections.

Huntsville, Tuscaloosa, and Montgomery have public employment protections on the basis of both sexual orientation and gender identity.

== Hate crime law ==
Since 1994, Alabama has had a hate crime law applicable to "race, color, religion, national origin, ethnicity, or physical or mental disability." The current law does not apply to crimes committed on account of sexual orientation or gender identity.

On April 24, 2009, State Representative Alvin Holmes introduced HB533, a bill that would have added sexual orientation to the list of hate crime categories. State Representative Patricia Todd, the Legislature's first and only openly‐LGBTQ member, unsuccessfully attempted to add gender identity to the bill, but was opposed by Holmes and other legislators. Holmes said he believed that his bill covering only sexual orientation would protect persons victimized as a result of their gender identity. Holmes had introduced identical bills in previous sessions: HB829 (2008), HB247 (2007), HB57 (2006), HB423 (2001), HB85 (2000), and has pushed for the inclusion of sexual orientation in the hate crime law since at least 1999.

In April 2009, the Alabama House of Representatives passed Holmes' bill by a vote of 46 to 41. The Alabama Senate Judiciary Committee later approved the bill, but the full Senate took no action on it before the Legislature adjourned on May 15, 2009.

HB413 (2016) was sponsored by Todd and Representative Juandalynn Givan to add protections for sexual orientation and gender identity and HB8 (2017), but neither bill made it to a vote.

In 2019, the Alabama Senate Judiciary Committee approved a bill that would have added police officers to the protected classes covered by the hate crime statute. Senator Vivian Davis Figures of Mobile added an amendment that would have also included sexual orientation as a protected class. Though it passed the Senate committee, it did not pass the legislature.

The Matthew Shepard and James Byrd Jr. Hate Crimes Prevention Act, approved by the United States Congress and signed into law by President Barack Obama in October 2009, bans such hate crimes federally.

== Education ==
From 1992 to 2021, Alabama's no promo homo law said that "course materials and instruction that relate to sexual education or sexually transmitted diseases should include [...] an emphasis, in a factual manner and from a public health perspective, that homosexuality is not a lifestyle acceptable to the general public and that homosexual conduct is a criminal offense under the laws of the state." The law was repealed in April 2021 after Governor Kay Ivey signed the Alabama Legislature's bill to repeal all archaic references to "homosexuality and HIV/AIDS" in Alabama's post-1992 sex education laws.

== Transgender rights ==
=== Gender-affirming healthcare ===
Since May 8, 2022, it is a Class C felony for a medical provider to give gender-affirming care (including puberty blockers, hormones, or surgeries) to anyone under the age of 19. The medical provider can be punished by 10 years in prison. The ban was temporarily not enforceable while it was challenged in court. On August 21, 2023, the 11th U.S. Circuit Court of Appeals said that Alabama could begin enforcing the ban until the court could make a permanent decision. The trial is scheduled for April 2, 2024.

Alabama is the first U.S. state to implement a law like this. The bill, called the "Vulnerable Child Compassion and Protection Act", had been introduced in previous years. The Alabama Legislature passed it in early 2022 (SB 184), and Governor Kay Ivey signed it on April 8. It took effect one month later.

The state of Alabama hired James Cantor as an expert witness in defense of the ban of gender-affirming care for minors with gender dysphoria. However, on cross-examination, federal judge Liles C. Burke discovered that Cantor had no clinical experience diagnosing or treating minors with gender dysphoria, nor in monitoring such patients for improvements, and that he lacked knowledge of the treatments and methods used in gender clinics in the state of Alabama. As a result, Burke wrote that he gave Cantor's testimony "very little weight".

On May 13, 2022, five days after the law had taken effect, Burke temporarily halted the parts of the law that prohibit doctors from prescribing puberty blockers and hormone therapies from going into effect while the law is challenged in court. However the parts of the law that prohibit minors from receiving sex-altering surgeries remain in effect. An article in The New York Times summarized the changes:

Judge Burke found that particular element of the law most likely unconstitutional, writing that parents have a fundamental right to direct the care of their children within medically accepted standards and that limiting care to gender-nonconforming children amounted to sex discrimination.

A January 2023 review of the state of Alabama's expenses for the trans medical care suit revealed that the state had spent over $1 million on legal council, and over $500,000 on expert witnesses.

==== Boe v. Marshall (aka Eknes-Tucker v. Ivey) ====
Five parents sued the state, with Alabama Attorney General Steve Marshall as a defendant. They argued that the law prevented them from making decisions about their children's healthcare. The state asked the parents for "all medical records" and "all documents" related to their children's "Gender Dysphoria", to any care provider who "treated" the children for gender dysphoria, and to "any mental health treatment" of these children. In August 2023, a three-judge panel of the 11th U.S. Circuit Court of Appeals decided to allow the ban to take effect. On September 11, 2023, plaintiffs asked for a rehearing in the full court. Although the U.S. Department of Justice tried to pause this case, on December 26, 2023, U.S. District Judge Liles Burke said it could continue. On 1 May 2025, plaintiffs withdrew their legal challenge to the state law, a decision the state attorney general praised as a victory. Consequently, the ban remained in force.

=== Identity documents ===
Alabama allows an individual who can provide documentation of having had their sex "changed by surgical procedure" and having changed their name to amend legal documents, such as birth certificates and driver's licenses, to their current sex.

In January 2021, a federal judge ruled that Alabama's requirement of sexual reassignment surgery to amend sex on legal documents was a violation of the plaintiff's rights (in part under the Equal Protection Clause.) A month later this case, referred to as Corbitt v. Taylor, was appealed to the Eleventh Circuit by the defendants. The Eleventh Circuit struck down the lower court's ruling, leaving the requirement for sex and name changes standing.

=== Sports ===
Since July 1, 2021, Alabama requires single-sex sports teams in public schools to consider a student's "biological sex". The Alabama Legislature passed the bill earlier that year, and Governor Kay Ivey signed it. House Bill 261 was signed into law on May 30, 2023, which prohibits people in colleges and universities from competing in sports or on a sports team differing from their sex assigned at birth, even if the individual has undergone gender-affirming hormone therapy, with the exception of co-ed sports.

=== Bathroom ban ===
HB322, a house bill to require public school students to use bathrooms consistent with the gender on their birth certificate, passed the Alabama House of Representatives in February 2022 and the Alabama Senate in April 2022. The Senate version included an amendment to ban K–5 classroom "instruction" on sexuality and gender. On April 8, 2022, Governor Ivey signed it into law as Act No. 2022-290.

In September 2022, the Alabama Board of Education implemented and codified the policy in full.

In March 2024, the House and Senate passed a bill that would eliminate DEI programs at universities and would also ban people from using bathrooms that aren't aligned with their sex assigned at birth.

=== Senate Bill 79 ===
In February 2025, Senate Bill 79 was signed into law by Governor Kay Ivey. It declares that gender is an immutable male-female binary (determined by biological sex assigned at birth), and that "neither the state nor any political subdivision of the state shall be prohibited from establishing separate single-sex spaces or environments for males and females when biology, privacy, safety, or fairness are implicated."

== Politics ==
Patricia Todd, a member of the Alabama House of Representatives, was elected in November 2006 and became the first ever openly gay elected official in the state of Alabama. In September 2013, she married her wife, Jennifer Clarke, in Massachusetts.

In the 2018 Alabama House of Representatives election, Neil Rafferty, a former member of the United States Marine Corps, was elected to represent the 54th House District of Alabama. Rafferty became Alabama's first openly gay congressman. He resides in Birmingham with his husband Michael Rudulph.

=== Organizations ===
- Alabama Stonewall Democrats

== Public opinion ==
A 2017 Public Religion Research Institute (PRRI) poll found that 42% of Alabamians supported same-sex marriage, while 51% were opposed. 7% were undecided. The same poll also found that 58% supported an anti-discrimination law covering sexual orientation and gender identity. 34% were against. Additionally, 51% were against allowing public businesses to refuse to serve LGBTQ people due to religious beliefs, while 41% supported allowing such religiously-based refusals.

A 2022 Public Religion Research Institute (PRRI) poll found that 53% of Alabamians supported same-sex marriage, while 41% were opposed. 6% were undecided. The same poll also found that 69% supported an anti-discrimination law covering sexual orientation and gender identity. 26% were against. 5% were undecided. Additionally, 47% were against allowing public businesses to refuse to serve LGBTQ people due to religious beliefs, while 46% supported allowing such religiously-based refusals. 6% were undecided.

In 2025, support for same-sex marriage increased to 54% of Alabamians. 66% supported anti-discrimination laws, and 50% were opposed to religiously based refusals.

== Summary table ==
Same-sex sexual activity legal	(Since 2003; codified in 2019)	
Equal age of consent (16)	(Since 2003)	
Same-sex marriage	(Since 2015, under Obergefell v. Hodges; not codified into law yet)	
Recognition of same-sex couples in legal unions outside of marriage (e.g. civil unions or domestic partnership)		
LGBTQ people and materials free from censorship	No (Although since 2021, the old "no homo promo law" was repealed, in 2022 a new law was enacted censoring LGBT subjects in the classroom again)	
Both joint and step child adoption by same-sex couples legally recognised	(Since 2015)	
Lesbian, gay and bisexual people allowed to serve openly in the military	(Since 2011)	
Transgender people allowed to serve openly in the military	(Banned since 2025)	
Transvestites allowed to serve openly in the military	No (Cross-dressing banned in the military since 2012)	
Intersex people allowed to serve openly in the military	No (Current Department of Defense policy bans "hermaphrodites" from serving or enlisting in the military)	
Right to change legal gender on birth certificates	(Requires SRS)	
Right to change legal gender on drivers licenses	(No longer requires SRS since 2021)	
Third gender option on legal documents	No	
Gay panic defense abolished	No	
Gay and lesbian criminal records expunged	No	
Equal access to IVF for lesbian couples		
Banning sexual reassignment surgery on minors	Yes (In litigation)	
Commercial surrogacy for gay male couples		
Homosexuality declassified as a mental illness	Yes (since 1973)	
Transgender identity declassified as a mental illness	Yes (since 1994) Not considered a mental illness. (Note: Diagnosis of "gender dysphoria" in accordance with DSM-5 (2013), is made only if there is "clinically significant distress or impairment in social, occupational, or other important areas of functioning", the American Psychiatric Association advises. The DSM-IV (1994) listed "gender identity disorder" with simlilar clinical criteria. Between 1980 and 1994, "transsexualism" was listed as a mental disorder by the DSM-III, without any criteria of "distress" or "impaired function" (in effect, classifying transgender identity itself as a mental disorder).)	
Intersex sex characteristics declassified as a physical deformity		
Anti discrimination laws and protections	Sexual orientation	Gender identity
Anti-discrimination laws in public employment	(Under Bostock v Clayton County, Georgia)	(Under Glenn v. Brumby)
Anti-discrimination laws in private employment	(Under Bostock v Clayton County, Georgia)	(Under Glenn v. Brumby)
Anti-discrimination laws in public accommodations	/ (Varies by jurisdiction)	/ (Varies by jurisdiction)
Anti-discrimination laws in housing	/ (Varies by jurisdiction)	/ (Varies by jurisdiction)
Anti-discrimination laws in credit and lending services	/ (Varies by jurisdiction)	/ (Varies by jurisdiction)
Hate crime law		
Conversion therapy banned on minors		

== See also ==
- LGBTQ rights in the United States
- Equality Alabama
- Politics of Alabama
- No promo homo laws
