= Birmingham United Soccer Association =

The Birmingham United Soccer Association is a youth soccer organization located in Birmingham, Alabama, United States. Birmingham United and its affiliates form the largest soccer club in Alabama, claiming over 2500 registered members. Birmingham United serves youth soccer players from ages 3 years to 18 years with a set of age and skill appropriate programming.

Birmingham United was formed in 2006 as a merger between the American Soccer Club of Birmingham and Shelby County, Alabama and the Mountain Brook Soccer Club of Mountain Brook, Alabama. At the time of the merger, American Soccer and Mountain Brook Soccer were the two largest independent clubs in Alabama, and each had enjoyed considerable recognition and success during their 25-year histories. The two agreed to merge for the purpose of combining their coaching, volunteer, and facilities resources to improve the game of soccer in the state of Alabama.

Birmingham United operates a large very competitive soccer tournament each March, the Red Diamond Vulcan Cup.
