= James Clemens High School =

Public high school in Madison, Alabama, USA

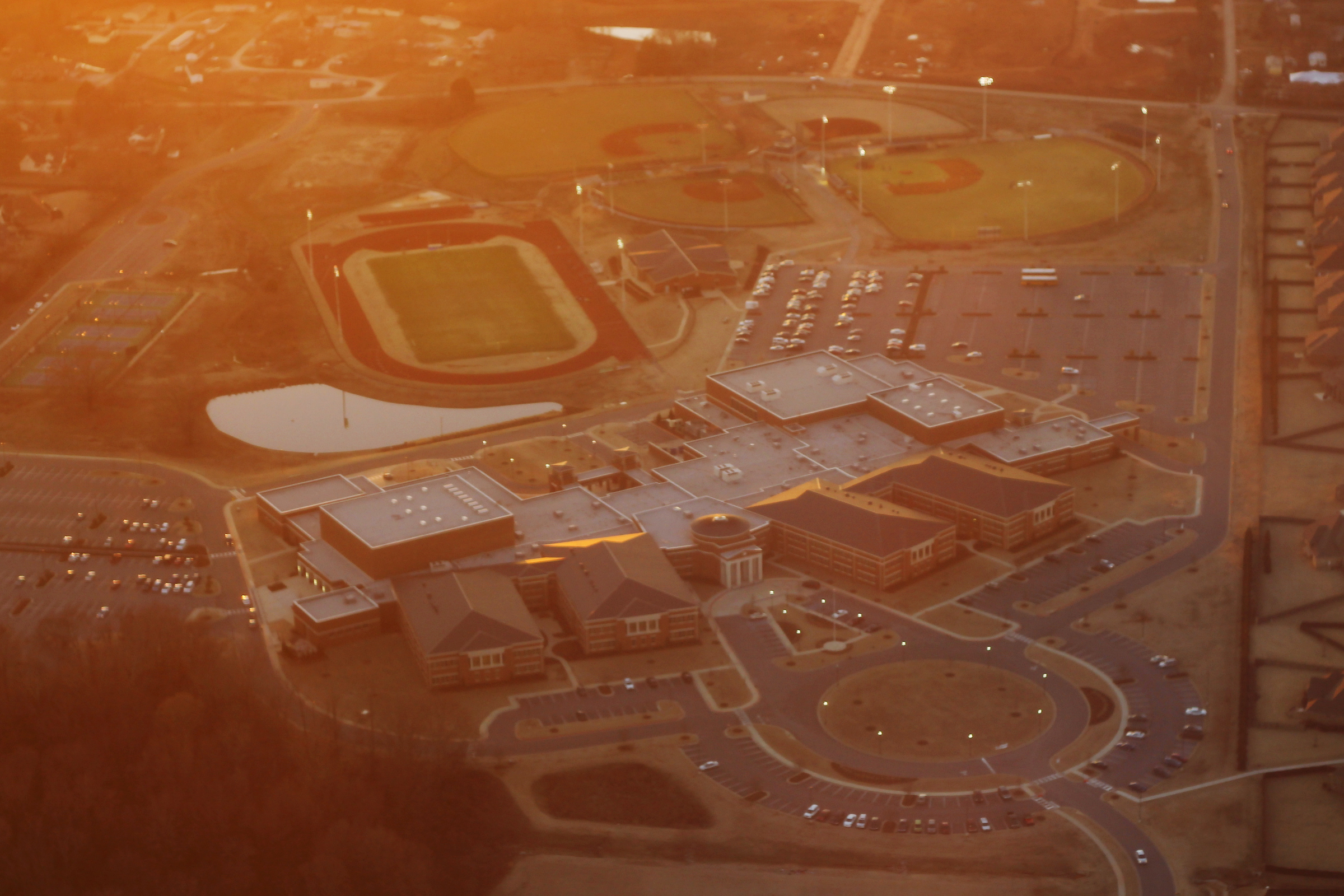
- Aerial view of the school

Location
- 11306 County Line Rd. Madison, Alabama 35756; United States; 34°42′21″N 86°47′31″W

Information
- Type: Public
- Motto: "Where opportunity meets inspiration"
- Established: 2012 (14 years ago)
- Oversight: Madison City Schools
- CEEB code: 011701
- Principal: Kerry Donaldson
- Teaching staff: 120.83 (on an FTE basis)
- Grades: 9-12
- Enrollment: 2,159 (2024–2025)
- Student to teacher ratio: 17.87
- Campus type: Suburban
- Colors: Navy blue and Carolina blue
- Mascot: Jets
- Nickname: Jets
- Rival: Bob Jones High School Sparkman High School
- Newspaper: Jet Stream
- Website: jchs.madisoncity.k12.al.us
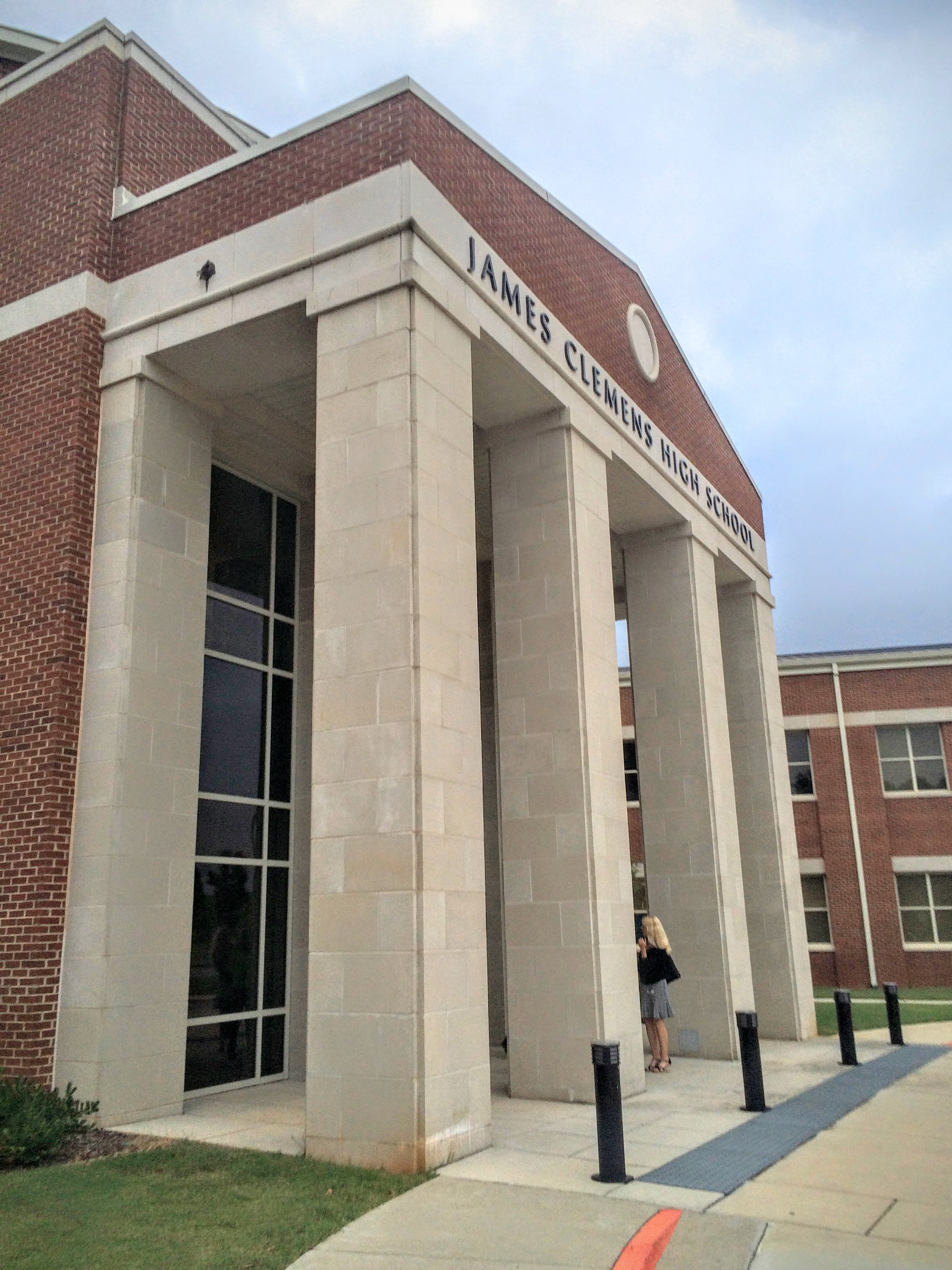

James Clemens High School is a public high school in Madison, Alabama, United States. The school is a part of Madison City Schools. The school is named after James Clemens, the founder of Madison, Alabama. James Clemens was the second high school to be built in Madison, a necessary endeavor to serve the rapid growth of the community. The city was rezoned for two high schools with Liberty Middle School feeding into James Clemens. It is the 4th largest high school in Alabama by enrolled students, only Thompson, Baker, and Hoover High Schools have more enrolled students.

== Clubs and organizations ==
James Clemens offers over 70 clubs and organizations, many of them service based, such as Interact Club and Junior Civitan, providing funds and services for the surrounding community.

James Clemens High School is home to the JROTC "Jet Battalion", with over 100 cadets enrolled. The Jet Battalion's Color Guard presents The Colors at every home football game, basketball game, and soccer game. The Jet Battalion also cleans the Madison City Schools Stadium after every home game. In 2015, the Battalion started rebuilding a Grumman F-9 Cougar, concluding the project in 2023 with the display on campus.

== Notable events ==
On December 14, 2022, videos were released of James Clemens assistant principal Jason Watts engaging in a physical altercation with a female student on a bus while it was loading other students. Two students had allegedly gotten into a physical altercation with each other on the bus, at which point Watts and other administrative members of the school staff were called to help defuse the situation. Watts started arguing with one of the students, and the student allegedly bit his arm. Watts then grabbed the student by the neck and hit her. Several other students started confronting Watts after this. Following the incident, both of the students who engaged in a physical altercation with each other were suspended.

Madison City Schools superintendent Ed Nichols spoke on the incident the next day, where he defended Watts' actions, stating, "I’m never going to tell someone if they are being assaulted, that they can’t defend themselves from further harm."

On March 21, 2023, the family of the student involved in the incident filed a lawsuit against Watts, as well as the Madison City Schools Board of Education and former James Clemens principal Brian Clayton. The lawsuit claimed that the student was in special education.

On April 20, 2023, Madison City Schools announced Dr. Kerry Donaldson as the Principal of James Clemens, following the retirement of the previous principal, Dr. Clayton, in December 2022.

== Athletics ==
James Clemens provides students with the opportunity to compete in many of the major high school sports.

| Sport | Boys' athletics | Girls' athletics |
|---|---|---|
| Football | Yes | No |
| Volleyball | No | Yes |
| Basketball | Yes | Yes |
| Baseball | Yes | Unknown |
| Softball | No | Yes |
| Wrestling | Yes | No |
| Competitive cheerleading | No | Yes |
| Cross country | Yes | Yes |
| Track and field | Coed | Coed |
| Tennis | Yes | Yes |
| Golf | Yes | Yes |
| Soccer | Yes | Yes |
| Swimming and diving | Yes | Yes |
| Bowling | Yes | Yes |
| Lacrosse | Yes | Yes |

== Notable alumni ==
- Gio Lopez, quarterback for the Wake Forest Demon Deacons
- Monty Rice, linebacker for the Tennessee Titans
- Logan Stenberg, offensive guard for the Detroit Lions
