= Football at the 2023 SEA Games – Men's team squads =

Below are the squads for the 2023 SEA Games Men's tournament, which will take place between 29 April to 16 May 2023.

Ten under-22 national teams affiliated with ASEAN Football Federation (AFF) and participating in this tournament are required to register a final squad containing up to 20 players, including two goalkeepers. Only the players from the following squad list are allowed to appear in this tournament.

The age listed is the age of each player is one day before the tournament, April 28 2023. The club listed is the last club where the player concerned plays a competitive match before the tournament. Fold flag for each club According to the State Football Association (not league) the club is affiliated.

== Group A ==
=== Cambodia ===
Head coach: (Japan) Keisuke Honda

The final squad was announced on 28 April 2023.

No.	Pos.	Player	Date of birth (age)	Club
1	GK	Vireak Dara	30 October 2003 (aged 19)	(Football Federation of Cambodia) Preah Khan Reach Svay Rieng
2	DF	Chea Sokmeng	26 November 2002 (aged 20)	(Football Federation of Cambodia) Nagaworld
3	DF	Taing Bunchhai	28 December 2002 (aged 20)	(Football Federation of Cambodia) Boeung Ket
4	DF	Soeuth Nava	13 February 2001 (aged 22)	(Football Federation of Cambodia) Boeung Ket
5	MF	Chou Sinti	1 April 2003 (aged 20)	(Football Federation of Cambodia) Preah Khan Reach Svay Rieng
6	DF	Ny Sokry	7 September 2001 (aged 21)	(Football Federation of Cambodia) Preah Khan Reach Svay Rieng
7	FW	Lim Pisoth	29 August 2001 (aged 21)	(Football Federation of Cambodia) Phnom Penh Crown
8	DF	Leng Nora	19 September 2004 (aged 18)	(Football Federation of Cambodia) Visakha
9	FW	Sieng Chanthea (captain)	9 September 2002 (aged 20)	(Football Federation of Cambodia) Boeung Ket
10	MF	Nhean Sosidan	11 October 2002 (aged 20)	(Football Federation of Cambodia) Tiffy Army
11	MF	Min Ratanak	30 July 2002 (aged 20)	(Football Federation of Cambodia) Preah Khan Reach Svay Rieng
13	DF	Chan Sarapich	5 April 2002 (aged 21)	(Football Federation of Cambodia) Visakha
14	MF	Sin Sovannmakara	6 December 2004 (aged 18)	(Football Federation of Cambodia) Visakha
15	MF	Lim Aarun Raymond	25 June 2003 (aged 19)	(Football Federation of Cambodia) Nagaworld
16	FW	Ky Rina	5 August 2002 (aged 20)	(Football Federation of Cambodia) Prey Veng
17	MF	Sophal Dimong	4 March 2001 (aged 22)	(Football Federation of Cambodia) Angkor Tiger
18	DF	Phat Sokha	2 May 2003 (aged 19)	(Football Federation of Cambodia) Nagaworld
19	DF	Sor Rotana	9 October 2002 (aged 20)	(Football Federation of Cambodia) Visakha
20	MF	Koeut Pich	15 November 2003 (aged 19)	(Football Federation of Cambodia) Phnom Penh Crown
21	GK	Reth Lyheng	1 January 2004 (aged 19)	(Football Federation of Cambodia) Nagaworld

=== Indonesia ===
Head coach: (Indonesia) Indra Sjafri

The final 20-man squad was announced on 21 April 2023.

No.	Pos.	Player	Date of birth (age)	Club
1	GK	Adi Satryo	7 July 2001 (aged 21)	(Football Association of Indonesia) PSIS Semarang
2	DF	Bagas Kaffa	16 January 2002 (aged 21)	(Football Association of Indonesia) Barito Putera
3	DF	Rio Fahmi	6 October 2001 (aged 21)	(Football Association of Indonesia) Persija Jakarta
4	DF	Komang Teguh	28 April 2002 (aged 21)	(Football Association of Indonesia) Borneo Samarinda
5	DF	Rizky Ridho (captain)	21 November 2001 (aged 21)	(Football Association of Indonesia) Persija Jakarta
6	MF	Ananda Raehan	17 December 2003 (aged 19)	(Football Association of Indonesia) PSM Makassar
7	MF	Marselino Ferdinan	9 September 2004 (aged 18)	(Royal Belgian Football Association) Deinze
8	FW	Witan Sulaeman	8 October 2001 (aged 21)	(Football Association of Indonesia) Persija Jakarta
9	FW	Ramadhan Sananta	27 November 2002 (aged 20)	(Football Association of Indonesia) PSM Makassar
10	MF	Beckham Putra	29 October 2001 (aged 21)	(Football Association of Indonesia) Persib Bandung
11	FW	Jeam Kelly Sroyer	11 December 2002 (aged 20)	(Football Association of Indonesia) Persik Kediri
12	DF	Pratama Arhan	21 December 2001 (aged 21)	(Japan Football Association) Tokyo Verdy
13	DF	Haykal Alhafiz	24 March 2001 (aged 22)	(Football Association of Indonesia) PSIS Semarang
14	MF	Fajar Fathur Rahman	29 May 2002 (aged 20)	(Football Association of Indonesia) Borneo Samarinda
15	MF	Taufany Muslihuddin	24 March 2002 (aged 21)	(Football Association of Indonesia) Borneo Samarinda
16	DF	Muhammad Ferarri	21 June 2003 (aged 19)	(Football Association of Indonesia) Persija Jakarta
17	FW	Irfan Jauhari	31 January 2001 (aged 22)	(Football Association of Indonesia) Persis Solo
18	FW	Titan Agung	5 June 2001 (aged 21)	(Football Association of Indonesia) Bhayangkara
19	DF	Alfeandra Dewangga	28 June 2001 (aged 21)	(Football Association of Indonesia) PSIS Semarang
20	GK	Ernando Ari	27 February 2002 (aged 21)	(Football Association of Indonesia) Persebaya Surabaya

=== Myanmar ===
Head coach: (Germany) Michael Feichtenbeiner

The final squad was announced on 26 April 2023.

No.	Pos.	Player	Date of birth (age)	Club
1	GK	Pyae Phyo Thu	11 October 2002 (aged 20)	(Myanmar Football Federation) Yadanarbon
2	DF	Nyan Lin Htet	10 January 2002 (aged 21)	(Myanmar Football Federation) Yangon United
3	DF	Thet Hein Soe	29 September 2001 (aged 21)	(Myanmar Football Federation) Yadanarbon
4	DF	Latt Wai Phone	4 May 2005 (aged 17)	(Myanmar Football Federation) Shan United
5	DF	Kaung Htet Paing	27 May 2004 (aged 18)	(Myanmar Football Federation) Yadanarbon
6	MF	Yan Kyaw Soe	4 January 2002 (aged 21)	(Myanmar Football Federation) Yangon United
7	MF	Zaw Win Thein (captain)	1 March 2003 (aged 20)	(Myanmar Football Federation) Yangon United
8	MF	Ye Yint Phyo	26 July 2003 (aged 19)	(Myanmar Football Federation) Ayeyawady
9	FW	Oakkar Naing	8 November 2003 (aged 19)	(Myanmar Football Federation) Yangon United
10	FW	Hein Htet Aung	5 October 2001 (aged 21)	(Football Association of Malaysia) Selangor
11	FW	Khun Kyaw Zin Hein	5 July 2002 (aged 20)	(Myanmar Football Federation) Hanthawaddy
12	DF	Shine Thant Aung	31 May 2002 (aged 20)	(Myanmar Football Federation) Hanthawaddy
13	DF	Htoo Myat Khant	23 March 2004 (aged 19)	(Myanmar Football Federation) Kachin United
14	FW	Aung Thiha	6 July 2004 (aged 18)	(Myanmar Football Federation) Ayeyawady
15	MF	Aung Myo Khant	16 May 2001 (aged 21)	(Myanmar Football Federation) Yadanarbon
16	MF	Arkar Kyaw	7 February 2003 (aged 20)	(Myanmar Football Federation) Mahar United
17	MF	Chit Aye	17 January 2003 (aged 20)	(Myanmar Football Federation) Yadanarbon
18	GK	Hein Htet Soe	21 June 2003 (aged 19)	(Myanmar Football Federation) Ayeyawady
19	DF	Naung Naung Soe	10 October 2002 (aged 20)	(Myanmar Football Federation) Yadanarbon
20	FW	Swan Htet	12 April 2005 (aged 18)	(Myanmar Football Federation) Yadanarbon

=== Philippines ===
Head coach: Rob Gier

The final squad was announced on 28 April 2023.

No.	Pos.	Player	Date of birth (age)	Club
1	GK	Quincy Kammeraad (captain)	1 February 2001 (aged 22)	(Philippine Football Federation) Kaya
2	DF	Santiago Rublico	16 August 2005 (aged 17)	(Royal Spanish Football Federation) Atlético Madrid B
4	DF	Kamil Amirul	6 February 2004 (aged 19)	(Philippine Football Federation) ADT
5	DF	Daniel Christensen	4 August 2004 (aged 18)	(Philippine Football Federation) ADT
7	MF	Dennis Chung	24 January 2001 (aged 22)	(Philippine Football Federation) ADT
9	FW	Andres Aldeguer	18 December 2003 (aged 19)	(Philippine Football Federation) ADT
10	MF	Justin Frias	24 July 2003 (aged 19)	(Philippine Football Federation) ADT
11	MF	Yrick Gallantes	14 January 2001 (aged 22)	(Philippine Football Federation) ADT
12	DF	Dov Cariño	18 December 2003 (aged 19)	(Philippine Football Federation) ADT
13	MF	Jacob Peña	27 November 2001 (aged 21)	(Philippine Football Federation) Stallion Laguna
14	MF	Gavin Muens	24 October 2004 (aged 18)	(Philippine Football Federation) ADT
17	DF	Noah Leddel	30 August 2003 (aged 19)	(United States Soccer Federation) Black Rock
18	GK	Enrico Mangaoang	28 May 2002 (aged 20)	(Philippine Football Federation) ADT
19	MF	Jaime Sacopon	24 March 2004 (aged 19)	(Philippine Football Federation) ADT
21	FW	Carlo Dorin	7 June 2001 (aged 21)	Unattached
22	DF	Pocholo Bugas	3 December 2001 (aged 21)	(Philippine Football Federation) ADT
23	MF	Lance Ocampo	23 September 2001 (aged 21)	(Japan Football Association) NUCB
25	MF	Harry Nuñez	16 December 2004 (aged 18)	(Philippine Football Federation) ADT
53	DF	David Setters	9 May 2004 (aged 18)	(Philippine Football Federation) ADT
71	DF	John Lucero	1 December 2003 (aged 19)	(The Football Association) Worthing

=== Timor-Leste ===
Head coach: (South Korea) Park Sun-tae

The final squad was announced on 28 April 2023.

No.	Pos.	Player	Date of birth (age)	Club
1	GK	Georgino Mendonça	16 March 2002 (aged 21)	(East Timor Football Federation) Boavista
2	DF	Danilo Menezes Alves	31 May 2004 (aged 18)	(East Timor Football Federation) Boavista
3	DF	Orcelio	30 April 2001 (aged 21)	(East Timor Football Federation) Karketu Dili
4	DF	Candido Oliveira	2 December 1997 (aged 25)	(East Timor Football Federation) Ponta Leste
5	MF	Cristevão	16 January 2004 (aged 19)	(East Timor Football Federation) SLB Laulara
6	MF	Jhon Firth (captain)	17 July 2002 (aged 20)	(East Timor Football Federation) SLB Laulara
7	MF	Elias Mesquita	17 July 2002 (aged 20)	(East Timor Football Federation) Lalenkok United
8	MF	Edencio Soares	5 October 2005 (aged 17)	(East Timor Football Federation) Ponta Leste
9	FW	Alexandro Kefi	20 December 2004 (aged 18)	(East Timor Football Federation) SLB Laulara
10	FW	Mouzinho	26 June 2002 (aged 20)	(Football Federation of Cambodia) Visakha
11	FW	Zenivio	22 April 2005 (aged 18)	(East Timor Football Federation) SLB Laulara
12	GK	Junildo Pereira	4 June 2003 (aged 19)	(East Timor Football Federation) Assalam
13	DF	Juvito Moniz	8 December 2003 (aged 19)	(East Timor Football Federation) Ponta Leste
14	MF	Kornelis Portela	12 January 2001 (aged 22)	(East Timor Football Federation) SLB Laulara
15	DF	Xavier Olagar	18 May 2003 (aged 19)	(East Timor Football Federation) Ponta Leste
16	DF	João Bosco	2 March 2003 (aged 20)	(East Timor Football Federation) Ponta Leste
17	MF	Luís Figo	11 December 2003 (aged 19)	(East Timor Football Federation) SLB Laulara
18	FW	Mário Quintão	18 February 2004 (aged 19)	(East Timor Football Federation) Emmanuel
19	FW	Alexandro Bahkito	1 May 2006 (aged 16)	(East Timor Football Federation) SLB Laulara
20	DF	Ricardo Bianco	15 January 2006 (aged 17)	(East Timor Football Federation) SLB Laulara

== Group B ==
=== Vietnam ===
Head coach: (France) Philippe Troussier

The final squad was announced on 29 April 2023.

No.	Pos.	Player	Date of birth (age)	Club
1	GK	Quan Văn Chuẩn (captain)	7 January 2001 (age 25)	(Vietnam Football Federation) Hà Nội
2	DF	Phan Tuấn Tài	7 January 2001 (age 25)	(Vietnam Football Federation) Viettel
3	DF	Lương Duy Cương	7 November 2001 (age 25)	(Vietnam Football Federation) SHB Đà Nẵng
4	DF	Trần Quang Thịnh	12 May 2001 (age 25)	(Vietnam Football Federation) Công An Hà Nội
5	DF	Nguyễn Ngọc Thắng	31 January 2002 (age 24)	(Vietnam Football Federation) Hồng Lĩnh Hà Tĩnh
6	DF	Vũ Tiến Long	4 April 2002 (age 24)	(Vietnam Football Federation) Hà Nội
7	MF	Lê Văn Đô	7 August 2001 (age 25)	(Vietnam Football Federation) Công An Hà Nội
8	MF	Khuất Văn Khang	11 May 2003 (age 23)	(Vietnam Football Federation) Viettel
9	FW	Nguyễn Văn Tùng	7 December 2001 (age 24)	(Vietnam Football Federation) Hà Nội
10	MF	Đinh Xuân Tiến	10 January 2003 (age 23)	(Vietnam Football Federation) Sông Lam Nghệ An
11	FW	Nguyễn Thanh Nhàn	28 July 2003 (age 23)	(Vietnam Football Federation) PVF-CAND
12	MF	Nguyễn Thái Sơn	13 July 2003 (age 23)	(Vietnam Football Federation) Thanh Hóa
13	DF	Hồ Văn Cường	15 January 2003 (age 23)	(Vietnam Football Federation) Sông Lam Nghệ An
14	FW	Nguyễn Văn Trường	10 September 2003 (age 23)	(Vietnam Football Federation) Hà Nội
15	MF	Huỳnh Công Đến	19 August 2001 (age 25)	(Vietnam Football Federation) PVF-CAND
16	MF	Lê Quốc Nhật Nam	23 March 2001 (age 25)	(Vietnam Football Federation) Huế
17	DF	Võ Minh Trọng	24 October 2001 (age 25)	(Vietnam Football Federation) Đồng Tháp
18	MF	Nguyễn Đức Phú	13 January 2003 (age 23)	(Vietnam Football Federation) PVF-CAND
19	FW	Nguyễn Quốc Việt	4 May 2003 (age 23)	(Vietnam Football Federation) Hoàng Anh Gia Lai
20	GK	Đoàn Huy Hoàng	18 June 2003 (age 23)	(Vietnam Football Federation) Viettel

=== Thailand ===
Head coach: (Thailand) Issara Sritaro

The final squad was announced on 26 April 2023.

No.	Pos.	Player	Date of birth (age)	Club
1	GK	Soponwit Rakyart	25 January 2001 (aged 22)	(Football Association of Thailand) Phrae United
2	DF	Bukkoree Lemdee	March 11, 2004 (aged 19)	(Football Association of Thailand) Customs United
3	DF	Chatmongkol Rueangthanarot	May 9, 2002 (aged 20)	(Football Association of Thailand) Chonburi
4	DF	Jonathan Khemdee	May 9, 2002 (aged 20)	(Football Association of Thailand) Ratchaburi
5	DF	Songchai Thongcham	June 9, 2001 (aged 21)	(Football Association of Thailand) Chonburi
6	MF	Airfan Doloh (captain)	January 26, 2001 (aged 22)	(Football Association of Thailand) Buriram United
7	MF	Channarong Promsrikaew	April 17, 2001 (aged 22)	(Football Association of Thailand) Chonburi
8	FW	Teerasak Poeiphimai	September 21, 2002 (aged 20)	(Football Association of Thailand) Port
9	FW	Yotsakorn Burapha	June 8, 2005 (aged 17)	(Football Association of Thailand) Samut Prakan City
10	FW	Achitpol Keereerom	October 21, 2001 (aged 21)	(German Football Association) FC Augsburg II
11	FW	Anan Yodsangwal	July 9, 2001 (aged 21)	(Football Association of Thailand) Lamphun Warriors
12	DF	Apisit Saenseekammuan	11 October 2002 (age 24)	(Football Association of Thailand) Nongbua Pitchaya
13	DF	Pongsakorn Trisat	September 12, 2003 (aged 19)	(Football Association of Thailand) Samut Prakan City
14	MF	Purachet Thodsanit	May 9, 2001 (aged 21)	(Football Association of Thailand) Muangthong United
15	DF	Jakkapong Sanmahung	April 6, 2002 (aged 21)	(Football Association of Thailand) Uthai Thani
16	MF	Leon James	August 29, 2001 (aged 21)	(Football Association of Thailand) Nongbua Pitchaya
17	MF	Settasit Suwannasit	March 6, 2002 (aged 21)	(Football Association of Thailand) Chiangrai United
18	MF	Thirapak Prueangna	August 15, 2001 (aged 21)	(Football Association of Thailand) Ayutthaya United
19	MF	Chayapipat Supunpasuch	February 25, 2001 (aged 22)	(Portuguese Football Federation) Praiense
20	GK	Thirawut Sraunson	November 10, 2001 (aged 21)	(Football Association of Thailand) Kasetsart

=== Malaysia ===
Head coach: E. Elavarasan

The final squad was announced on 1 May 2023.

No.	Pos.	Player	Date of birth (age)	Club
1	GK	Sikh Izhan	23 March 2002 (aged 21)	(Football Association of Malaysia) Negeri Sembilan
2	DF	V. Ruventhiran	24 August 2001 (aged 21)	(Football Association of Malaysia) Selangor
3	DF	Ubaidullah Shamsul Fazili	30 November 2003 (aged 19)	(Football Association of Malaysia) Terengganu II
4	DF	Azrin Afiq	1 January 2002 (aged 21)	(Football Association of Malaysia) Kedah Darul Aman
5	DF	Harith Haiqal	22 June 2002 (aged 20)	(Football Association of Malaysia) Selangor
6	DF	Azam Azmi	12 February 2001 (aged 22)	(Football Association of Malaysia) Terengganu
7	MF	Mukhairi Ajmal (captain)	7 November 2001 (aged 21)	(Football Association of Malaysia) Selangor
8	MF	Adam Farhan	4 March 2004 (aged 19)	(Football Association of Malaysia) Johor Darul Ta'zim II
10	MF	Aliff Izwan	10 February 2004 (aged 19)	(Football Association of Malaysia) Selangor
11	FW	Najmuddin Akmal	11 January 2003 (aged 20)	(Football Association of Malaysia) Johor Darul Ta'zim II
13	FW	T. Saravanan	26 February 2001 (aged 22)	(Football Association of Malaysia) Kuala Lumpur City
14	DF	Zikri Khalili	25 June 2002 (aged 20)	(Football Association of Malaysia) Selangor
15	FW	Fergus Tierney	19 March 2003 (aged 20)	(Football Association of Malaysia) Johor Darul Ta'zim II
17	MF	Syahir Bashah	16 September 2001 (aged 21)	(Football Association of Malaysia) Selangor
18	FW	Daryl Sham	30 November 2002 (aged 20)	(Football Association of Malaysia) Johor Darul Ta'zim II
19	FW	Muslihudin Atiq	20 July 2002 (aged 20)	(Football Association of Malaysia) Terengganu II
20	MF	Aiman Afif	18 February 2001 (aged 22)	(Football Association of Malaysia) Kedah Darul Aman
21	DF	Safwan Mazlan	22 February 2002 (aged 21)	(Football Association of Malaysia) Terengganu
22	FW	Haqimi Azim	6 January 2003 (aged 20)	(Football Association of Malaysia) Kuala Lumpur City
23	GK	Azim Al-Amin	20 September 2001 (aged 21)	(Football Association of Malaysia) Kuala Lumpur City

=== Singapore ===
Head coach: Philippe Aw

The final squad list was announced on 26 April 2023.

No.	Pos.	Player	Date of birth (age)	Club
1	GK	Wayne Chew	22 October 2001 (age 25)	(Football Association of Singapore) Young Lions
2	DF	Ryaan Sanizal	31 May 2002 (age 24)	(Football Association of Singapore) Tampines Rovers
3	FW	Abdul Rasaq Akeem	16 June 2001 (age 25)	(Football Association of Singapore) Lion City Sailors
4	DF	Bill Mamadou	8 September 2001 (age 25)	(Football Association of Singapore) Lion City Sailors
5	DF	Kieran Teo	6 April 2004 (age 22)	(Football Association of Singapore) Young Lions
6	DF	Nur Adam Abdullah	13 April 2001 (age 25)	(Football Association of Singapore) Lion City Sailors
7	MF	Ajay Robson	6 December 2003 (age 22)	(Football Association of Singapore) Hougang United
8	MF	Harhys Stewart (captain)	20 March 2001 (age 25)	(Football Association of Singapore) Young Lions
9	FW	Syahadat Masnawi	16 June 2001 (age 25)	(Football Association of Singapore) Young Lions
10	MF	Elijah Lim	9 March 2002 (age 24)	(Football Association of Singapore) Young Lions
11	DF	Fairuz Fazli	20 January 2005 (age 21)	(Football Association of Singapore) Young Lions
12	DF	Aqil Yazid	9 January 2004 (age 22)	(Football Association of Singapore) Young Lions
13	DF	Andrew Aw	29 March 2003 (age 23)	(Football Association of Singapore) Young Lions
14	MF	Jared Gallagher	18 January 2002 (age 24)	(Football Association of Singapore) Young Lions
15	FW	Nicky Melvin Singh	13 June 2002 (age 24)	(Football Association of Singapore) Albirex Niigata (S)
16	MF	Fathullah Rahmat	5 September 2002 (age 24)	(Football Association of Singapore) Tanjong Pagar United
17	FW	Jordan Emaviwe	9 April 2001 (age 25)	(Football Association of Singapore) Young Lions
18	GK	Aizil Yazid	24 December 2004 (age 21)	(Football Association of Singapore) Young Lions
19	DF	Adam Reefdy	8 May 2004 (age 22)	(Football Association of Singapore) Young Lions
20	DF	Ilhan Noor	19 February 2002 (age 24)	(Football Association of Singapore) Young Lions

=== Laos ===
Head coach: (Germany) Michael Weiß

The final squad was announced on 29 April 2023.

No.	Pos.	Player	Date of birth (age)	Club
1	GK	Kop Lokphathip	8 May 2006 (age 20)	(Lao Football Federation) Ezra
2	DF	Phoutthavong Sangvilay (captain)	16 October 2004 (age 22)	(Lao Football Federation) Ezra
3	DF	Phonsack Seesavath	4 October 2004 (age 22)	(Lao Football Federation) Ezra
4	DF	Anantaza Siphongphan	9 November 2004 (age 22)	(Lao Football Federation) Ezra
5	DF	Phetdavanh Somsanid	24 April 2004 (age 22)	(Lao Football Federation) Master 7
6	MF	Chanthavixay Khounthoumphone	17 February 2004 (age 22)	(Lao Football Federation) Ezra
7	FW	Anousone Xaypanya	16 December 2002 (age 23)	(Lao Football Federation) Ezra
8	MF	Roman Angot	2 March 2001 (age 25)	(German Football Association) Bahlinger SC
9	FW	Athit Louanglath	18 May 2004 (age 22)	(Lao Football Federation) Ezra
10	FW	Chony Waenpaseuth	27 November 2002 (age 23)	(Lao Football Federation) Ezra
11	FW	Soukphachan Lueanthala	24 August 2002 (age 24)	(Lao Football Federation) Master 7
12	GK	Solasak Thilavong	3 November 2003 (age 23)	(Lao Football Federation) Young Elephants
13	FW	Victor Ngovinnasack		(French Football Federation) Montceau Bourgogne
14	DF	Inthachak Sisouphan	23 May 2001 (age 25)	(Lao Football Federation) Luang Prabang
15	MF	Damoth Thongkhamsavath	3 April 2004 (age 22)	(Lao Football Federation) Ezra
16	MF	Sonexay Phanhthaxay	10 June 2001 (age 25)	(Lao Football Federation) Master 7
17	FW	Thanongsay Rammangkoun	12 April 2003 (age 23)	(Lao Football Federation) Namtha United
18	MF	Theo Klein	3 December 2001 (age 24)	(United States Soccer Federation) Omaha Mavericks
19	DF	Nalongsit Chanthalangsy	3 December 2001 (age 24)	(Lao Football Federation) Viengchanh
20	MF	Phoutthalak Thongsanith	3 December 2002 (age 23)	(Lao Football Federation) Ezra

== Statistics ==
Note: Only the final squad of each team is taken into consideration.

=== Age ===
==== Outfield players ====
- Oldest: (Vietnam) Phan Tuấn Tài (22 years, 111 days)
- Youngest: (Philippines) Santiago Rublico (17 years, 255 days)

==== Goalkeepers ====
- Oldest: (Vietnam) Quan Văn Chuẩn (22 years, 111 days)
- Youngest: (Laos) Kop Lokphathip (16 years, 355 days)

==== Captains ====
- Oldest: (Vietnam) Quan Văn Chuẩn (22 years, 111 days)
- Youngest: (Laos) Phoutthavong Sangvilay (18 years, 194 days)

==== Coaches ====
- Oldest: (France) Philippe Troussier (68 years, 38 days)
- Youngest: (Japan) Keisuke Honda (36 years, 319 days)
