= Football at the 2023 SEA Games =

Sports tournament in Cambodia

- Mascot

Event details
- Games: 2023 SEA Games
- Host country: Cambodia
- Dates: 29 April – 16 May
- Venues: 4 (in 1 host city)
- Competitors: 360 from 10 nations

Men's tournament
- Teams: 10 (from 1 sub-confederation)
Medalists
Gold	Indonesia
Silver	Thailand
Bronze	Vietnam

Women's tournament
- Teams: 8 (from 1 sub-confederation)
Medalists
Gold	Vietnam
Silver	Myanmar
Bronze	Thailand

Editions
- ← 2021 2025 →

The football tournament at the 2023 SEA Games was held from 29 April to 16 May 2023 in Cambodia. All matches were held in Phnom Penh city.

Associations affiliated with FIFA might send teams to participate in the tournament. There were no age restrictions on women's teams. For men's teams, the age limit returned from under-23 to under-22 (born on or after 1 January 2001) with no overage players being allowed.

The draw was held on 5 April 2023 at the Morodok Techo National Stadium.

== Competition schedule ==
The following is the competition schedule for the football competitions:

G	Group stage	½	Semifinals	B	3rd place play-off	F	Final

Event	Sat 29	Sun 30	Mon 1	Tue 2	Wed 3	Thu 4	Fri 5	Sat 6	Sun 7	Mon 8	Tue 9	Wed 10	Thu 11	Fri 12	Sat 13	Sun 14	Mon 15		Tue 16	
Men	G	G		G	G	G		G	G	G		G	G		½				B	F
Women					G			G			G			½			B	F		

== Venues ==
A total of 4 venues in Phnom Penh were used to host the football matches. Olympic Stadium and Visakha Stadium hosted the men's tournament, the women's Bronze medal match and Gold medal match. Meanwhile, Old Stadium and RSN Stadium hosted the women's group stage and semifinals.

Football at the 2023 SEA Games (Cambodia)
Football at the 2023 SEA Games (Cambodia)	Olympic Stadium	Visakha Stadium	RCAF Old Stadium	RSN Stadium
Football at the 2023 SEA Games (Cambodia)	Capacity: 50,000	Capacity: 15,000	Capacity: 8,000	Capacity: 5,000

== Participating nations ==
Nation	Men's	Women's
Brunei	No	No
Cambodia	Yes	Yes
Indonesia	Yes	No
Laos	Yes	Yes
Malaysia	Yes	Yes
Myanmar	Yes	Yes
Philippines	Yes	Yes
Singapore	Yes	Yes
Thailand	Yes	Yes
Timor-Leste	Yes	No
Vietnam	Yes	Yes
Total: 10 NOCs	10	8

== Men's tournament ==
=== Group stage ===
- All times are Cambodia Standard Time (UTC+7).

==== Group A ====
Pos	Team	Pld	W	D	L	GF	GA	GD	Pts	Qualification
1	Indonesia	4	4	0	0	13	1	+12	12	Advance to Semi-finals
2	Myanmar	4	3	0	1	4	5	−1	9	Advance to Semi-finals
3	Cambodia (H)	4	1	1	2	6	5	+1	4	
4	Timor-Leste	4	1	0	3	3	8	−5	3	
5	Philippines	4	0	1	3	1	8	−7	1	

Source: FIFA
(H) Hosts

==== Group B ====
Pos	Team	Pld	W	D	L	GF	GA	GD	Pts	Qualification
1	Thailand	4	3	1	0	10	3	+7	10	Advance to Semi-finals
2	Vietnam	4	3	1	0	8	3	+5	10	Advance to Semi-finals
3	Malaysia	4	2	0	2	13	5	+8	6	
4	Laos	4	0	1	3	2	11	−9	1	
5	Singapore	4	0	1	3	2	13	−11	1	

Source: FIFA

=== Knockout stage ===
Semi-finals
13 May – Phnom Penh
Indonesia	3
Vietnam	2
13 May – Phnom Penh
Thailand	3
Myanmar	0

Gold medal match
16 May – Phnom Penh
Indonesia (a.e.t.)	5
Thailand	2
Bronze medal match
16 May – Phnom Penh
Vietnam	3
Myanmar	1

== Women's tournament ==
=== Group stage ===
- All times are Cambodia Standard Time (UTC+7).

==== Group A ====
Pos	Team	Pld	W	D	L	GF	GA	GD	Pts	Qualification
1	Vietnam	3	2	0	1	7	3	+4	6	Advance to Semi-finals
2	Myanmar	3	2	0	1	7	4	+3	6	Advance to Semi-finals
3	Philippines	3	2	0	1	3	2	+1	6	
4	Malaysia	3	0	0	3	1	9	−8	0	
5	Indonesia	0	0	0	0	0	0	0	0	Withdrew

Source: FIFA

==== Group B ====
Pos	Team	Pld	W	D	L	GF	GA	GD	Pts	Qualification
1	Thailand	3	3	0	0	13	0	+13	9	Advance to Semi-finals
2	Cambodia (H)	3	2	0	1	3	3	0	6	Advance to Semi-finals
3	Singapore	3	1	0	2	2	6	−4	3	
4	Laos	3	0	0	3	1	10	−9	0	

Source: FIFA
(H) Hosts

=== Knockout stage ===
Semi-finals
12 May – Phnom Penh
Vietnam	4
Cambodia	0
12 May – Phnom Penh
Thailand	2
Myanmar	4

Gold medal match
15 May – Phnom Penh
Vietnam	2
Myanmar	0
Bronze medal match
15 May – Phnom Penh
Cambodia	0
Thailand	6

== Medal summary ==
=== Medal table ===
* Host nation (Cambodia)

Rank	Nation	Gold	Silver	Bronze	Total
1	Vietnam (VIE)	1	0	1	2
2	Indonesia (INA)	1	0	0	1
3	Thailand (THA)	0	1	1	2
4	Myanmar (MYA)	0	1	0	1
Totals (4 entries)		2	2	2	6

=== Medalists ===
Event	Gold	Silver	Bronze
Men's tournament	Indonesia; Adi Satryo; Bagas Kaffa; Rio Fahmi; Komang Teguh; Rizky Ridho; Ananda Raehan; Marselino Ferdinan; Witan Sulaeman; Ramadhan Sananta; Beckham Putra; Jeam Kelly Sroyer; Pratama Arhan; Haykal Alhafiz; Fajar Fathur Rahman; Taufany Muslihuddin; Muhammad Ferarri; Irfan Jauhari; Titan Agung; Alfeandra Dewangga; Ernando Ari	Thailand; Soponwit Rakyart; Bukkoree Lemdee; Chatmongkol Rueangthanarot; Jonathan Khemdee; Songchai Thongcham; Airfan Doloh; Channarong Promsrikaew; Teerasak Poeiphimai; Yotsakorn Burapha; Achitpol Keereerom; Anan Yodsangwal; Apisit Saenseekammuan; Pongsakorn Trisat; Purachet Thodsanit; Jakkapong Sanmahung; Leon James; Settasit Suvannaseat; Thirapak Prueangna; Chayapipat Supunpasuch; Thirawoot Sraunson	Vietnam; Quan Văn Chuẩn; Phan Tuấn Tài; Lương Duy Cương; Trần Quang Thịnh; Nguyễn Ngọc Thắng; Vũ Tiến Long; Lê Văn Đô; Khuất Văn Khang; Nguyễn Văn Tùng; Đinh Xuân Tiến; Nguyễn Thanh Nhàn; Nguyễn Thái Sơn; Hồ Văn Cường; Nguyễn Văn Trường; Huỳnh Công Đến; Lê Quốc Nhật Nam; Võ Minh Trọng; Nguyễn Đức Phú; Nguyễn Quốc Việt; Đoàn Huy Hoàng
Women's tournament	Vietnam; Dương Thị Vân; Hoàng Thị Loan; Huỳnh Như; Khổng Thị Hằng; Lê Thị Diễm My; Lương Thị Thu Thương; Ngân Thị Vạn Sự; Nguyễn Thị Bích Thùy; Nguyễn Thị Mỹ Anh; Nguyễn Thị Thanh Nhã; Nguyễn Thị Tuyết Dung; Phạm Hải Yến; Thái Thị Thảo; Trần Thị Hải Linh; Trần Thị Kim Thanh; Trần Thị Thu; Trần Thị Thu Thảo; Trần Thị Thúy Nga; Trần Thị Thùy Trang; Vũ Thị Hoa	Myanmar; Aye Aye Moe; July Kyaw; Khin Marlar Tun; Khin Mo Mo Tun; Khin Myo Win; Khin Than Wai; Lin Myint Mo; May Thet Mon Myint; May Zin Nwe; Moe Ma Ma Soe; Myat Noe Khin; Naw Htet Htet Wai; Phyu Phyu Win; Pont Pont Pyae Maung; San Thaw Thaw; Shwe Vee Tun; Win Theingi Tun; Yuper Khine; Zu Latt Nadi; Zune Yu Ya Oo	Thailand; Pattaranan Aupachai; Supapron Intaraprasit; Thanchanok Jansri; Panittha Jeeratanapavibul; Orawan Keereesuwannakul; Saruda Konfay; Pichayatida Manowang; Jiraporn Mongkoldee; Nualanong Muensri; Nipawan Panyosuk; Saowalak Peng-ngam; Nutwadee Pram-nak; Chatchawan Rodthong; Kanjanaporn Saenkhun; Thichanan Sodchuen; Ploychompoo Somnuek; Pluemjai Sontisawat; Tiffany Sornpao; Parichat Thongrong; Orapin Waenngoen
