= Ramadhan Sananta =

Indonesian footballer (born 2002)

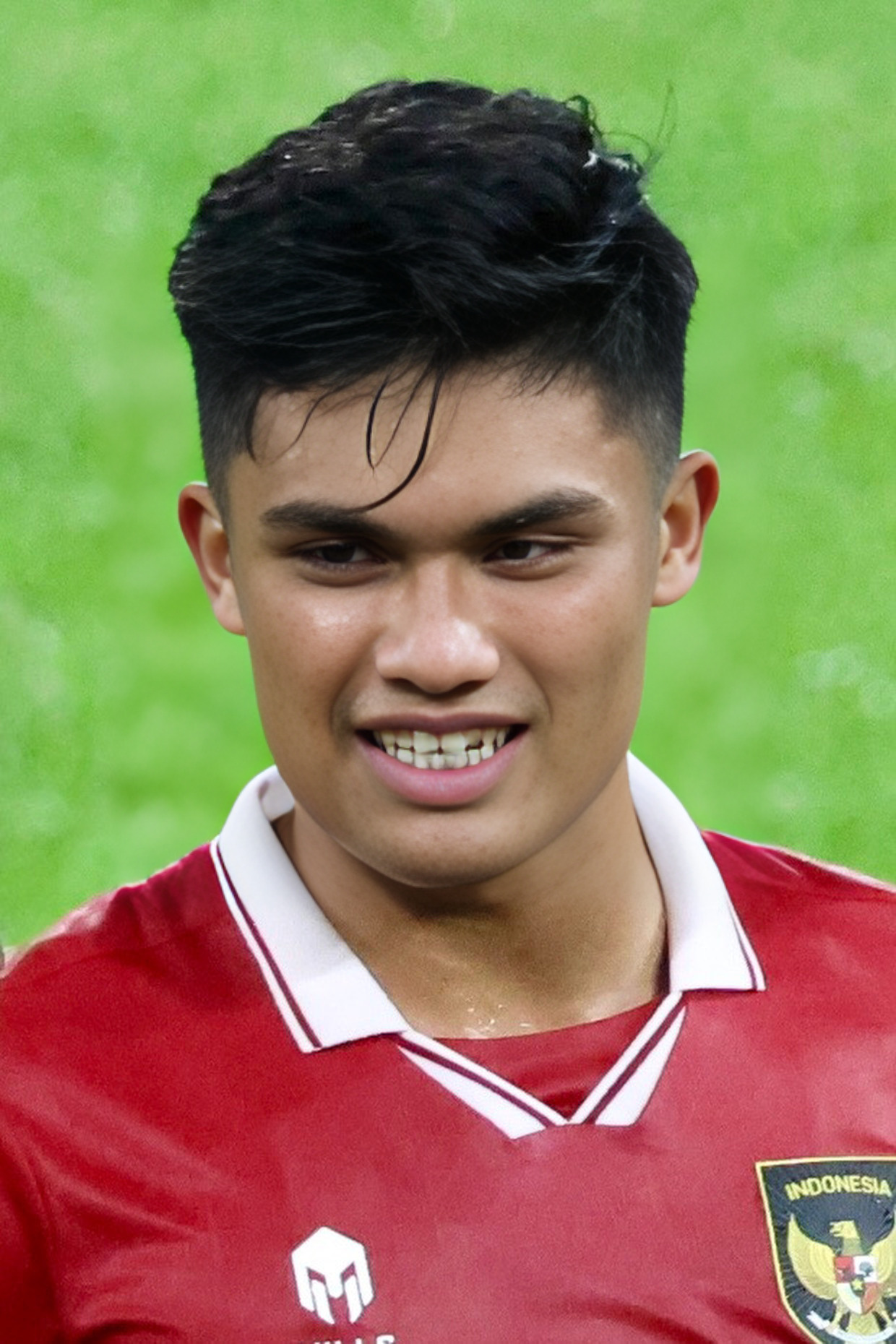
- Sananta playing for Indonesia in 2023

Personal information
- Full name: Muhammad Ramadhan Sananta
- Date of birth: 27 November 2002 (age 23)
- Place of birth: Daik, Lingga, Indonesia
- Height: 1.82 m (6 ft 0 in)
- Position: Striker

Team information
- Current team: Persebaya Surabaya
- Number: 9

Youth career
- –2019: Kepri Belia FC
- 2019: Asian Schools Football
- 2019–2020: PPLP Kepulauan Riau

Senior career*
Years	Team	Apps	(Gls)
2021	PS Harjuna Putra	12	(9)
2021–2022	Persikabo 1973	4	(0)
2022–2023	PSM Makassar	24	(11)
2023–2025	Persis Solo	53	(13)
2025–2026	DPMM	21	(2)
2026–	Persebaya Surabaya	1	(0)

International career^{‡}
2023–2024	Indonesia U23	21	(8)
2022–	Indonesia	20	(6)
Medal record
Men's football
Representing Indonesia
FIFA Series
Runner-up	2026 Indonesia
Southeast Asian Games
Gold medal – first place	2023 Cambodia	Team
AFF U-23 Championship
Runner-up	2023 Thailand	Team
- * Club domestic league appearances and goals as of 5 September 2026 ‡ National team caps and goals as of 30 March 2026

Muhammad Ramadhan Sananta (born 31 November 2002) is an Indonesian professional footballer who plays as a striker for Super League club Persebaya Surabaya and Indonesia national team.

== Club career ==
=== Persikabo 1973 ===
He was signed for Persikabo 1973 to play in the Liga 1 in the 2021 season. Sananta made his league debut on 3 February 2022 in a match against Bali United at the Ngurah Rai Stadium, Denpasar.

=== PSM Makassar ===
Sananta was signed for PSM Makassar to play in Liga 1 in the 2022–23 season. He made his league debut on 15 August 2022 in a match against RANS Nusantara at the Pakansari Stadium, Cibinong. On 29 August 2022, Sananta scored his first league goal for PSM Makassar with scored a brace in a 5–1 win over Persib Bandung at Parepare. On 10 September 2022, he scored the opening goal in a 3–0 home win over Persebaya Surabaya.

On 14 January 2023, Sananta scored a brace in a 4–0 win over PSS Sleman; the latter result saw PSM Makassar move to 1st position in the league table. On 25 January, he coming as a substitutes for Akbar Tanjung and made his first assist to Everton Nascimento in PSM's 4–2 away lose over Persija Jakarta. Five days later, Sananta scored equalizer in a 3–1 home win over RANS Nusantara. On 9 February, he scored in a 4–1 over PS Barito Putera. Five days later, Sananta scored another equalizer in a 2–1 away win over Persib at Pakansari Stadium, with his 1-goal, he has scored a total of 3 goals in the two encounters that led to Persib's two defeats against PSM Makassar. On 19 February, Sananta scored the winning goal in a 2–1 win over Persik Kediri, at the age of 20, he is the only purely local striker competing in the Liga 1 top scorer list this season. On 9 March, Sananta scored another the winning goal in a 0–1 away win over former club Persikabo 1973, scoring a penalty in the injury time of second half. This result makes PSM Makassar likely to win the 2022–23 Liga 1 with nine consecutive wins, while equaling Bali United's record in 2017 Liga 1.

=== Persis Solo ===
On 8 June 2023, Sananta signed a two-years contract with Persis Solo. Sananta made his club debut on 17 June 2023 in a pre-season friendly against K League 1 club Jeonbuk Hyundai Motors, also scored his first goal for the club, opening the scoring in a 1–2 lose. And scoring again in another friendly match against Persebaya Surabaya a week later.

Sananta made his league debut on 1 July 2023 and scored his first league goal in a 2–3 loss over Persebaya.

=== DPMM ===
On 19 May 2025, DPMM of Brunei announced the signing of Sananta for the 2025–26 Malaysia Super League season, occupying their allocated ASEAN slot. On 10 August 2025, Sananta made his debut and scored his first Malaysia Super League goal, in a 2–2 draw against PDRM. On 9 May 2026, Sananta was red-carded for a high boot in the 0–1 loss against Sabah, bringing his season with the Bruneian club to an end with four goals in 27 matches. On 13 May, DPMM announced his release from the club.

=== Persebaya Surabaya ===
On 17 June 2026, Sananta officially completed a transfer to Super League club Persebaya Surabaya in the 2026–27 season. He made his league debut for the Bajul Ijo on 5 September 2026, coming on as a substituted in a 1–1 draw against Bhayangkara Presisi.

== International career ==
=== Youth team ===
In April 2023, Sananta was called up to the Indonesia U22 for the training centre in preparation for 2023 SEA Games. Sananta made his international U22 debut on 14 April 2023 in a friendly match against Lebanon U22 at Gelora Bung Karno Stadium, Jakarta. On 4 May 2023, Sananta scored his first international goal for Indonesia U22, scoring a brace in a 5–0 win against Myanmar U22 in the 2023 Southeast Asian Games group stage. He continued his good form with the opening goal, scoring a header in a 3–0 victory over Timor-Leste U22 three days later, sending Indonesia to the semi-final match. On 16 May 2023, Sananta scored another brace in a final match against Thailand U22, in a 5–2 victory after extra time, and also winning the gold medal after a long wait of 32 years in the Southeast Asian Games. With a total of 5 goals, he became the top scorer along with his team-mate Fajar Fathur Rahman and Vietnamese player Nguyễn Văn Tùng.

=== Senior ===
On 24 September 2022, Sananta made his first cap for the Indonesia national team for a friendly match against Curacao in a 3–2 win. In December 2022, Sananta was included in the final 23-man squad for the 2022 AFF Championship by Shin Tae-Yong. On 26 December, Sananta scored his debut goal against Brunei in a 7–0 win on the group stage.

On 12 October 2023, Sananta scored a brace against Brunei in the 2026 FIFA World Cup qualifiers. He scored again in the second leg on 17 October 2023. Sananta was included in the 2023 AFC Asian Cup final squad. However he was never included in any of the match line-ups, as assistant coach Nova Arianto claimed that Sananta has an unfit condition throughout the tournament.

On 26 March 2024, Sananta scored a goal against Vietnam in a 3–0 victory in the 2026 FIFA World Cup second round qualifiers.

== Career statistics ==
=== Club ===
As of 5 September 2026

Club	Season	League			Cup		Continental		Other		Total	
Club	Season	Division	Apps	Goals	Apps	Goals	Apps	Goals	Apps	Goals	Apps	Goals
PS Harjuna Putra	2021–22	Liga 3	12	9	—		—		0	0	12	9
Persikabo 1973	2021–22	Liga 1	4	0	—		—		0	0	4	0
PSM Makassar	2022–23	Liga 1	24	11	—		2 (Note: Appearances in AFC Cup)	0	2 (Note: Appearances in Indonesia President's Cup)	0	28	11
Persis Solo	2023–24	Liga 1	23	8	—		—		0	0	23	8
Persis Solo	2024–25	Liga 1	30	5	—		—		0	0	30	5
Persis Solo	Total		53	13	0	0	—		0	0	53	13
DPMM	2025–26	Malaysia Super League	21	2	3 (Note: Appearances in Malaysia FA Cup)	1	—		3 (Note: Appearances in Malaysia Cup)	1	27	4
Persebaya Surabaya	2026–27	Super League	1	0	0	0	0	0	0	0	1	0
Career total			115	35	3	1	2	0	5	1	125	37

=== International ===
As of match played 30 March 2026

Appearances and goals by national team and year
National team	Year	Apps	Goals
Indonesia	2022	3	1
Indonesia	2023	4	3
Indonesia	2024	5	1
Indonesia	2025	6	1
Indonesia	2026	2	0
Total		20	6

As of match played 5 September 2025
Scores and results list Indonesia's goal tally first, score column indicates score after each Sananta goal.

List of international goals scored by Ramadhan Sananta
No.	Date	Venue	Cap	Opponent	Score	Result	Competition
1	26 December 2022	Kuala Lumpur Stadium, Kuala Lumpur, Malaysia	3	Brunei	5–0	7–0	2022 AFF Championship
2	12 October 2023	Gelora Bung Karno Stadium, Jakarta, Indonesia	5	Brunei	3–0	6–0	2026 FIFA World Cup qualification
3	12 October 2023	Gelora Bung Karno Stadium, Jakarta, Indonesia	5	Brunei	4–0	6–0	2026 FIFA World Cup qualification
4	17 October 2023	Hassanal Bolkiah National Stadium, Bandar Seri Begawan, Brunei	6	Brunei	6–0	6–0	2026 FIFA World Cup qualification
5	26 March 2024	Mỹ Đình National Stadium, Hanoi, Vietnam	12	Vietnam	3–0	3–0	2026 FIFA World Cup qualification
6	5 September 2025	Gelora Bung Tomo Stadium, Surabaya, Indonesia	16	Chinese Taipei	5–0	6–0	Friendly

== Honours ==
PSM Makassar

- Liga 1: 2022–23

Persebaya Surabaya

- Piala Presiden: 2026

Indonesia U23

- SEA Games gold medal: 2023
- AFF U-23 Championship runner-up: 2023

Individual

- Southeast Asian Games Top scorer: 2023
- AFF U-23 Championship Team of the Tournament: 2023
- Liga 1 Young Player of the Month: September 2023
- Piala Presiden Top scorer: 2024
