= Haykal Alhafiz =

Indonesian professional footballer

Personal information
- Full name: Mohammad Haykal Alhafiz
- Date of birth: 24 March 2001 (age 25)
- Place of birth: Sidoarjo, Indonesia
- Height: 1.72 m (5 ft 8 in)
- Position: Left-back

Team information
- Current team: PSMS Medan
- Number: 4

Youth career
- 2018: Persida Sidoarjo
- 2019: UNTAG Rosita
- 2019: Persebaya Surabaya
- 2019–2021: PON Jatim

Senior career*
| Years | Team | Apps | (Gls) |
| 2021–2022 | Persikab Bandung | 6 | (0) |
| 2023–2025 | PSIS Semarang | 45 | (0) |
| 2025–2026 | Borneo Samarinda | 1 | (0) |
| 2026 | → Kendal Tornado (loan) | 10 | (0) |
| 2026– | PSMS Medan | 1 | (0) |

International career
| 2023 | Indonesia U23 | 12 | (0) |
Medal record
Men's football
Representing Indonesia
Southeast Asian Games
| Gold medal – first place | 2023 Cambodia | Team |
AFF U-23 Championship
| Runner-up | 2023 Thailand | Team |
- * Club domestic league appearances and goals as of 13 September 2026

Mohammad Haykal Alhafiz (born 24 March 2001) is an Indonesian professional footballer who plays as a left-back for Championship club PSMS Medan.

== Early life ==
Born in 2001, Haykal was born in Sidoarjo, East Java, Indonesia.

== Club career ==
=== Youth career ===
As a youth player, Haykal joined PON Jatim.

=== Persikab Bandung ===
In 2021, Haykal is contracted by Persikab Bandung to sail in Liga 2.

=== PSIS Semarang ===
On 20 April 2023, PSIS Semarang announces new recruit, Haykal Alhafiz, signed for 2 seasons. Haykal has signed a contract with PSIS Semarang for 2 seasons, until 2025 with an option for a 1-year contract extension. Haykal made his debut on 3 July 2023 in a match against Bhayangkara at the Jatidiri Stadium, Semarang. On 9 June 2025, Haykal officially left PSIS Semarang.

=== Borneo Samarinda ===
On 25 June 2025, Haykal officially signed Borneo Samarinda.

== International career ==
In April 2023, Haykal was called up to the Indonesia U23 for the training centre in preparation for 2023 SEA Games. Haykal made his international debut on 14 April 2023 in a friendly match against Lebanon U23 at Gelora Bung Karno Stadium, Jakarta.

== Career statistics ==
=== Club ===
As of 13 September 2026

| Club | Season | League | | | Cup | | Continental | | Other | | Total | |
| Club | Season | Division | Apps | Goals | Apps | Goals | Apps | Goals | Apps | Goals | Apps | Goals |
|---|---|---|---|---|---|---|---|---|---|---|---|---|
| Persikab Bandung | 2022–23 | Liga 2 | 6 | 0 | 0 | 0 | – | | 0 | 0 | 6 | 0 |
| PSIS Semarang | 2023–24 | Liga 1 | 18 | 0 | 0 | 0 | – | | 0 | 0 | 18 | 0 |
| PSIS Semarang | 2024–25 | Liga 1 | 27 | 0 | 0 | 0 | – | | 0 | 0 | 27 | 0 |
| Borneo Samarinda | 2025–26 | Super League | 1 | 0 | 0 | 0 | – | | 0 | 0 | 1 | 0 |
| Kendal Tornado (loan) | 2025–26 | Championship | 10 | 0 | 0 | 0 | – | | 0 | 0 | 10 | 0 |
| PSMS Medan | 2026–27 | Championship | 1 | 0 | 0 | 0 | – | | 0 | 0 | 1 | 0 |
| Career total | | | 63 | 0 | 0 | 0 | 0 | 0 | 0 | 0 | 63 | 0 |

== Honours ==
=== International ===
Indonesia U-23

- SEA Games gold medal: 2023
- AFF U-23 Championship runner-up: 2023
