= Adi Satryo =

Indonesian association footballer

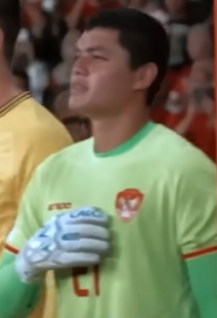
- Adi Satryo with Indonesia in 2024

Personal information
- Full name: Muhammad Adi Satryo
- Date of birth: 7 July 2001 (age 25)
- Place of birth: Tangerang, Indonesia
- Height: 1.80 m (5 ft 11 in)
- Position: Goalkeeper

Team information
- Current team: Arema
- Number: 30

Youth career
- 2017: Persib Bandung
- 2018: Kalteng Putra
- 2019–2020: PPLP DKI Jakarta

Senior career*
Years	Team	Apps	(Gls)
2020–2021	PSMS Medan	0	(0)
2021–2022	PSS Sleman	0	(0)
2022–2023	Persik Kediri	10	(0)
2023–2025	PSIS Semarang	54	(0)
2025–	Arema	22	(0)

International career
2019–2020	Indonesia U19	7	(0)
2022–2024	Indonesia U23	7	(0)
2021–2024	Indonesia	4	(0)
Medal record
Men's football
Representing Indonesia
AFF U-19 Youth Championship
Third place	2019 Vietnam
Southeast Asian Games
Gold medal – first place	2023 Cambodia	Team
Bronze medal – third place	2021 Vietnam	Team
- * Club domestic league appearances and goals as of 20 November 2026

Muhammad Adi Satryo (born 7 July 2001) is an Indonesian professional footballer who plays as a goalkeeper for Super League club Arema.

== Club career ==
=== PSS Sleman ===
Adi Satryo joined PSS Sleman from Liga 2 club PSMS Medan in March 2021 ahead of the 2021 Menpora Cup, in which he started in one match when starting goalkeeper Ega Rizky was off-duty.

=== Persik Kediri ===
In 2022, Satryo signed a contract with Indonesian Liga 1 club Persik Kediri. He made his league debut on 8 January 2022 in a match against Borneo at the Kapten I Wayan Dipta Stadium, Gianyar. In the 85th minute, Satryo had a terrible incident towards the end of the match, he was unconscious after being involved in an incident with Borneo's Kei Hirose in the continuation of the Liga 1 match and he could not continue the match and had to be hospitalized after previously collapsing from a hard kick and hitting his neck during a one-on-one duel. And a few days later, Satryo recovered quickly and not seriously injured. Satryo made his comeback to the squad, after being sidelined due to collapse in the previous match. In the match against Persikabo 1973 on 14 January, coming on as a starter and played the full 90 minute. On 6 February, he kept his first clean sheet in a 0–0 draw over PSIS Semarang. Satryo recorded five cleansheets in the 2021–22 Liga 1.

He officially left Persik Kediri at the end of the first round of 2022–23 Liga 1. Satryo recorded only 2 appearances. In every appearance he often makes blunders.

=== PSIS Semarang ===
Adi Satryo became PSIS Semarang's first recruit in half of the 2022–23 Liga 1. Adi Satryo was recruited by Laskar Mahesa Jenar to add depth to the squad in the goalkeeper position. Satryo made his league debut and also kept his first clean sheet on 16 January 2023 in a match against RANS Nusantara at the Pakansari Stadium, Bogor. and keeping two clean sheets in his second appearances, in a 1–0 win against Arema five days later. On 2 February, he made five brilliant saves in a match against Persikabo 1973 and was pulled off in the 80th minute due to an injury, he had to receive further treatment. On 9 June 2025, Adi Satryo officially left PSIS Semarang.

=== Arema ===
On 14 June 2025, Adi Satryo officially introduced by Arema.

== International career ==
Adi Satryo never played in an official match of the Indonesia national under-19 football team but was the starting goalkeeper for the U-19 team when they went on a two-month training session in Croatia where they played against other national youth squads. He debuted in a 9 August 2020 friendly match against Croatia U-19, in which Indonesia lost 1–7.

Despite Satryo's lack of experience in top-flight football or official international youth championships, Indonesia national football team coach Shin Tae-yong in May 2021 called him to join the senior team. On 25 May 2021, he earned his first senior cap in a friendly match in Dubai against Afghanistan.

In February 2022, Satryo was called up to play for the Indonesia under-23 team for the 2022 AFF U-23 Youth Championship.

On 21 March 2024, Satryo would return to play for the senior national team after almost 3 years since he last appeared. Satyro kept a clean-sheet against Vietnam in a 1–0 win in the 2026 FIFA World Cup qualifiers.

== Career statistics ==
=== Club ===
As of 20 November 2026

Club	Season	League			Cup		League cup		Continental		Other		Total	
Club	Season	Division	Apps	Goals	Apps	Goals	Apps	Goals	Apps	Goals	Apps	Goals	Apps	Goals
PSMS Medan	2020	Liga 2	0	0	0	0	0	0	–		0	0	0	0
PSS Sleman	2021–22	Liga 1	0	0	0	0	0	0	–		1 (Note: Appearances in Menpora Cup.)	0	1	0
Persik Kediri	2021–22	Liga 1	8	0	0	0	0	0	–		0	0	8	0
Persik Kediri	2022–23	Liga 1	2	0	0	0	0	0	–		0	0	2	0
Persik Kediri	Total		10	0	0	0	0	0	–		1	0	11	0
PSIS Semarang	2022–23	Liga 1	14	0	0	0	0	0	–		0	0	14	0
PSIS Semarang	2023–24	Liga 1	23	0	0	0	0	0	–		0	0	23	0
PSIS Semarang	2024–25	Liga 1	17	0	0	0	0	0	–		0	0	17	0
PSIS Semarang	Total		54	0	0	0	0	0	–		0	0	54	0
Arema	2025–26	Super League	14	0	0	0	0	0	–		0	0	14	0
Arema	2026–27	Super League	8	0	0	0	1	0	–		4 (Note: Appearances in Piala Presiden.)	0	13	0
Arema	Total		22	0	0	0	1	0	–		4	0	27	0
Career total			86	0	0	0	1	0	0	0	5	0	92	0

=== International ===
As of match played 2 June 2024

Appearances and goals by national team and year
National team	Year	Apps	Goals
Indonesia	2021	2	0
Indonesia	2024	2	0
Total		4	0

== Honours ==
=== Club ===
PSS Sleman

- Menpora Cup third place: 2021

=== International ===
Indonesia U-19

- AFF U-19 Youth Championship third place: 2019

Indonesia U-23

- SEA Games gold medal: 2023; bronze medal: 2021
