= Ananda Raehan =

Indonesian footballer

Personal information
- Full name: Ananda Raehan Alief
- Date of birth: 17 December 2003 (age 22)
- Place of birth: Makassar, Indonesia
- Height: 1.73 m (5 ft 8 in)
- Position: Defensive midfielder

Team information
- Current team: PSM Makassar
- Number: 88

Youth career
- SSB Hasanuddin
- 2021–2022: PSM Makassar

Senior career*
Years	Team	Apps	(Gls)
2022–	PSM Makassar	109	(3)

International career^{‡}
2023–2025	Indonesia U23	14	(0)
Medal record
Men's football
Representing Indonesia
Southeast Asian Games
Gold medal – first place	2023 Cambodia	Team
- * Club domestic league appearances and goals as of 16 October 2026 ‡ National team caps and goals as of 15 November 2025

Ananda Raehan Alief (born 17 December 2003) is an Indonesian professional footballer who plays as a defensive midfielder for Super League club PSM Makassar.

== Club career ==
=== PSM Makassar ===
Raehan is an original player from the PSM Makassar Academy. Last season he participated with PSM U-18 in the Elite Pro Academy, in the 2022 AFC Cup, Raehan played three matches as a substitute. Raehan made his league debut on 23 July 2022 in a match against PSS Sleman at the Maguwoharjo Stadium, Sleman. Raehan played the full 90 minutes in a 5–1 win against Persib Bandung on 28 August 2022.

On 14 January 2023, Raehan scored his first league goal for PSM Makassar with in a 4–0 win over PSS Sleman at Parepare. On 17 March, Raehan scored the opening goal for PSM in a 3–1 home win over Bhayangkara. 2022–23 Liga 1 was his first season and was both a team and individual success. He also contributed to his club becoming champions this season, he made 31 league appearances and scored two goals for PSM Makassar.

== International career ==
In April 2023, Raehan was called up to the Indonesia U22 for the training centre in preparation for 2023 SEA Games. Raehan made his international debut on 14 April 2023 in a friendly match against Lebanon U22 at Gelora Bung Karno Stadium, Jakarta.

== Career statistics ==
=== Club ===
As of 6 September 2026.

Club	Season	League			Cup		Continental		Other		Total	
Club	Season	Division	Apps	Goals	Apps	Goals	Apps	Goals	Apps	Goals	Apps	Goals
PSM Makassar	2022–23	Liga 1	31	2	0	0	3 (Note: Appearances in AFC Cup)	0	2 (Note: Appearances in Indonesia President's Cup)	0	36	2
PSM Makassar	2023–24	Liga 1	24	0	0	0	4	0	0	0	28	0
PSM Makassar	2024–25	Liga 1	25	0	0	0	–		6 (Note: Appearances in ASEAN Club Championship)	0	31	0
PSM Makassar	2025–26	Super League	24	0	0	0	–		0	0	24	0
PSM Makassar	2026–27	Super League	1	0	0	0	–		0	0	1	0
Career total			105	2	0	0	7	0	8	0	120	2

== Honours ==
PSM Makassar

- Liga 1: 2022–23

Indonesia U23

- SEA Games gold medal: 2023

Individual

- Liga 1 Young Player of the Month: February 2023
