= Jeam Kelly Sroyer =

Indonesian footballer

Personal information
- Full name: Jeam Kelly Sroyer
- Date of birth: 11 December 2002 (age 23)
- Place of birth: Biak, Indonesia
- Height: 1.69 m (5 ft 7 in)
- Position: Winger

Team information
- Current team: Persipura Jayapura
- Number: 82

Senior career*
Years	Team	Apps	(Gls)
2021	PSBS Biak	10	(1)
2022–2024	Persik Kediri	44	(5)
2024–2025	PSBS Biak	32	(2)
2025–	Persipura Jayapura	31	(7)

International career^{‡}
2023–2024	Indonesia U23	17	(1)
Medal record
Men's football
Representing Indonesia
Southeast Asian Games
Gold medal – first place	2023 Cambodia	Team
AFF U-23 Championship
Runner-up	2023 Thailand	Team
- * Club domestic league appearances and goals as of 2 October 2026 ‡ National team caps and goals as of 9 May 2024

Jeam Kelly Sroyer (born 11 December 2002) is an Indonesian professional footballer who plays as a winger for Championship club Persipura Jayapura.

== Club career ==
=== PSBS Biak ===
In 2021, Sroyer signed a contract with Indonesian Liga 2 club PSBS Biak. He made his league debut on 7 October 2021 in a match against Mitra Kukar at the Tuah Pahoe Stadium, Palangka Raya. On 3 November, Sroyer scored his first league goal in the 2021 Liga 2 for PSBS Biak in a 2–1 victory over Mitra Kukar.

=== Persik Kediri ===
He was signed for Persik Kediri to play in Liga 1 in the 2021 season. Sroyer made his professional debut on 8 January 2022 in a match against Borneo as a substitute for Antoni Nugroho in the 90th minute at the Kapten I Wayan Dipta Stadium, Gianyar. On 5 March, Sroyer scored his first league goal in 87th minute and saved Persik Kediri from losing to Madura United. score draw 2–2.

On 31 July 2022, he started his match in the 2022–23 Liga 1 season for Persik, playing as a substitutes in a 1–1 draw over Bhayangkara. Sroyer scored his first goal of the 2022–23 season on 17 December in a 1–0 win against Dewa United, while getting the first win in the new league season.

== International career ==
In April 2023, Sroyer was called up to the Indonesia U22 for the training centre in preparation for 2023 SEA Games. Sroyer made his international U22 debut on 14 April 2023 in a friendly match against Lebanon U22 at Gelora Bung Karno Stadium, Jakarta.

On 24 August 2023, Sroyer scored his first goal for the national team against Thailand U-23 in the 2023 AFF U-23 Championship.

== Career statistics ==
=== Club ===
As of 2 October 2026.

Club	Season	League			Cup		Continental		Other		Total	
Club	Season	Division	Apps	Goals	Apps	Goals	Apps	Goals	Apps	Goals	Apps	Goals
PSBS Biak	2021	Liga 2	10	1	0	0	–		0	0	10	1
Persik Kediri	2021–22	Liga 1	13	1	0	0	–		0	0	13	1
Persik Kediri	2022–23	Liga 1	8	1	0	0	–		2 (Note: Appearances in Indonesia President's Cup)	0	10	1
Persik Kediri	2023–24	Liga 1	23	3	0	0	–		0	0	23	3
Persik Kediri	Total		44	5	0	0	–		2	0	46	5
PSBS Biak	2024–25	Liga 1	32	2	0	0	–		0	0	32	2
Persipura Jayapura	2025–26	Championship	27	6	0	0	–		0	0	27	6
Persipura Jayapura	2026–27	Championship	4	1	0	0	–		0	0	4	1
Career total			117	15	0	0	0	0	2	0	119	15

=== International goals ===
International under-23 goals

Goal	Date	Venue	Opponent	Score	Result	Competition
1.	24 August 2023	Rayong Province Stadium, Rayong, Thailand	Thailand	1–0	3–1	2023 AFF U-23 Championship

== Honours ==
Indonesia U23

- SEA Games gold medal: 2023
- AFF U-23 Championship runner-up: 2023
