= Taufany Muslihuddin =

Indonesian footballer

Personal information
- Full name: Muhammad Taufany Muslihuddin
- Date of birth: 24 March 2002 (age 24)
- Place of birth: Tenggarong, Indonesia
- Height: 1.71 m (5 ft 7 in)
- Position: Attacking midfielder

Team information
- Current team: Madura United
- Number: 24

Youth career
- 2017: PS Penajam Utama
- 2018–2020: Borneo Samarinda

Senior career*
Years	Team	Apps	(Gls)
2021–2022	Mitra Kukar	7	(1)
2022–2025	Borneo Samarinda	18	(0)
2024–2025	→ Madura United (loan)	15	(0)
2025–	Madura United	16	(2)

International career^{‡}
2023	Indonesia U23	10	(1)
Medal record
Men's football
Representing Indonesia
Southeast Asian Games
Gold medal – first place	2023 Cambodia	Team
- * Club domestic league appearances and goals as of 10 January 2026 ‡ National team caps and goals as of 24 September 2023

Muhammad Taufany Muslihuddin (born 24 March 2002) is an Indonesian professional footballer who plays as an attacking midfielder for Super League club Madura United.

== Club career ==
=== PS Mitra Kukar ===
On 2021, Muslihuddin signed a one-year contract with Liga 2 club Mitra Kukar. He made 7 league appearances and scored 1 goal for Mitra Kukar in the 2021–22 Liga 2.

=== Borneo F.C. Samarinda ===
He was signed for Borneo Samarinda to play in Liga 1 in the 2022 season. Muslihuddin made his league debut on 19 December 2022 in a match against RANS Nusantara at the Manahan Stadium, Surakarta.

== International career ==
In April 2023, Muslihuddin was called up to the Indonesia under-23 for the training centre in preparation for 2023 SEA Games. Muslihuddin made his international under-23 debut on 14 April 2023 in a friendly match against Lebanon under-23 at Gelora Bung Karno Stadium, Jakarta. On 13 May 2023, Muslihuddin scored his first international goal for Indonesia under-23, scoring the winning goal in a 3–2 win against Vietnam under-23, sending Indonesia to the final match of the 2023 Southeast Asian Games.

== Career statistics ==
=== Club ===
As of 10 January 2026

Club	Season	League			Cup		Continental		Other		Total	
Club	Season	Division	Apps	Goals	Apps	Goals	Apps	Goals	Apps	Goals	Apps	Goals
Mitra Kukar	2021	Liga 2	7	1	0	0	–		0	0	7	1
Borneo Samarinda	2022–23	Liga 1	8	0	0	0	–		0	0	8	0
Borneo Samarinda	2023–24	Liga 1	10	0	0	0	–		0	0	10	0
Madura United (loan)	2024–25	Liga 1	15	0	0	0	3 (Note: Appearances in AFC Challenge League)	0	0	0	18	0
Madura United	2025–26	Super League	16	2	0	0	–		0	0	16	2
Career total			56	3	0	0	3	0	0	0	59	3

=== International goals ===
International under-23 goals

Goal	Date	Venue	Opponent	Score	Result	Competition
1.	13 May 2023	Olympic Stadium, Phnom Penh, Cambodia	Vietnam	3–2	3–2	2023 Southeast Asian Games

== Honours ==
=== International ===
Indonesia U-23

- SEA Games gold medal: 2023
