= Jonathan Khemdee =

Thai footballer (born 2002)

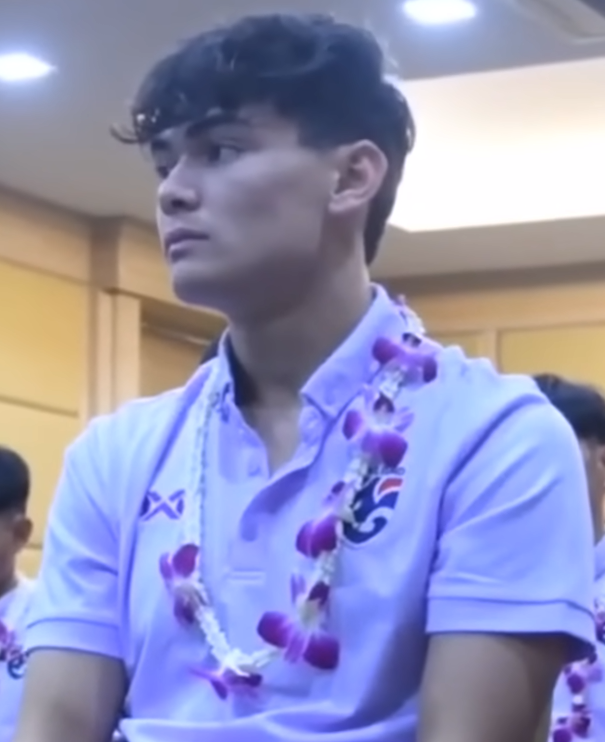
- Khemdee with Thailand U23 in 2023

Personal information
- Full name: Jonathan Khemdee
- Date of birth: 9 May 2002 (age 24)
- Place of birth: Surin, Thailand
- Height: 1.90 m (6 ft 3 in)
- Position: Centre-back

Team information
- Current team: Ratchaburi
- Number: 4

Youth career
- Skårup IF
- 2014–2015: Svendborg
- 2016–2021: OB

Senior career*
| Years | Team | Apps | (Gls) |
| 2021–2022 | OB | 0 | (0) |
| 2022 | → Næstved (loan) | 11 | (0) |
| 2023– | Ratchaburi | 72 | (3) |

International career^{‡}
| 2023 | Thailand U22 | 3 | (0) |
| 2021–2023 | Thailand U23 | 14 | (2) |
| 2024– | Thailand | 13 | (0) |
Medal record
Thailand under-23
SEA Games
| Silver medal – second place | Vietnam 2021 | Team |
| Silver medal – second place | Cambodia 2023 | Team |
Thailand
ASEAN Championship
| Runner-up | ASEAN 2024 | Team |
- * Club domestic league appearances and goals as of 9 January 2026 ‡ National team caps and goals as of 31 March 2026

Jonathan Khemdee (Thai: โจนาธาร เข็มดี, RTGS: Chonathan Khemdi, pronounced [t͡ɕōː.nāː.tʰāːn kʰěm.dīː]; born 9 May 2002) is a Thai professional footballer who plays as a centre-back for Thai League 1 club Ratchaburi and the Thailand national team.

== Club career ==
=== OB ===
On 10 March 2021, Khemdee made the debut with OB in the quarterfinals of the 2020–21 Danish Cup against Midtjylland. He signed his first professional contract with the club in July 2021. On 4 July 2022, OB announced that Khemdee would join the Danish 1st Division club Næstved Boldklub on a loan. On 21 November 2022, OB announced that Khemdee's contract with OB had been terminated by mutual consent.

=== Ratchaburi ===
On 21 January 2023, it was announced that Ratchaburi signing of Khemdee, introduces in front of the fans at the Dragon Solar Park during the 2022–23 Thai League 1 debut game, the second leg against Khonkaen United.

== International career ==
=== Youth ===
On 15 October 2021, Khemdee was called up to the Thailand under-23 national team for the 2022 AFC U-23 Asian Cup qualification phase.

On 16 May 2023, Khemdee announced his retirement from international football with the 2023 SEA Games being his final tournament, he stated that he wanted to rest and concentrate on playing football with his club. In December 2023, Khemdee returned to international football with Thailand U23 in the 2024 AFC U-23 Asian Cup.

=== Senior ===
Khemdee made his debut for the senior Thailand national team on 10 September 2024 in a 2024 LPBank Cup game against Vietnam at the Mỹ Đình National Stadium. He was selected in the Thailand squad for the 2024 ASEAN Championship.

== Personal life ==
Khemdee was born in Thailand and was raised in Denmark. He is of both Thai and Danish descent.

== Honours ==
=== International ===
Thailand U23

- SEA Games (silver) Silver medal (2): 2021, 2023

Thailand

- King's Cup: 2024
