= Titan Agung =

Indonesian footballer (born 2001)

Personal information
- Full name: Titan Agung Bagus Fawwazi
- Date of birth: 5 June 2001 (age 25)
- Place of birth: Malang, Indonesia
- Height: 1.76 m (5 ft 9 in)
- Position: Forward

Team information
- Current team: De Red
- Number: 21

Youth career
- 2017: Persid Jember
- 2018–2019: Arema

Senior career*
Years	Team	Apps	(Gls)
2019–2021	Arema	1	(0)
2021–2026	Bhayangkara	45	(4)
2025	→ Bekasi City (loan)	7	(3)
2026	→ Persela Lamongan (loan)	9	(4)
2026–	De Red	1	(0)

International career^{‡}
2023	Indonesia U23	9	(2)
Medal record
Men's football
Representing Indonesia
Southeast Asian Games
Gold medal – first place	2023 Cambodia	Team
- * Club domestic league appearances and goals as of 12 September 2026 ‡ National team caps and goals as of 24 September 2023

Titan Agung Bagus Fawwazi (born 5 June 2001) is an Indonesian professional footballer who plays as a forward for Championship club De Red.

== Club career ==
=== Arema ===
He joined the Arema Academy and played for the club at youth levels. During the 2019 season, Agung scored 2 goals in 8 appearances for the under-20s. Agung made his only match and professional debut for Arema in the Indonesian Liga 1 on 2 March 2020, against TIRA-Persikabo where he played as a substitute.

=== Bhayangkara ===
On 18 February 2020, Titan Agung officially joined with Bhayangkara after resigning from Arema. He made his league debut on 29 September 2021 as a substitute in a match against Persik Kediri at the Gelora Bung Karno Madya Stadium, Jakarta. On 5 December 2022, Titan Agung scored his first league goal in the 2022–23 Liga 1 for Bhayangkara in a 3–1 victory over PSS Sleman at the Jatidiri Stadium. He scored his league goal for the club, opening the scoring in a 2–1 loss against RANS Nusantara on 16 December 2022 at Maguwoharjo Stadium.

On 19 January 2023, he scored in a 2–3 lose over Persik Kediri.

==== Persela Lamongan (loan) ====
In January 2026, Titan Agung joined Persela Lamongan on loan for the remainder of the 2025–26 season. He made his debut for the club on 18 January 2026, appearing as a substitute in a 1–1 draw against PSS Sleman.

== International career ==
In April 2023, Titan Agung was called up to the Indonesia U22 for the training centre in preparation for 2023 SEA Games. Titan Agung made his international U22 debut on 14 April 2023 in a friendly match against Lebanon U22 at Gelora Bung Karno Stadium, Jakarta.

== Career statistics ==
=== Club ===
As of 12 September 2026

Club	Season	League			Cup		Continental		Other		Total	
Club	Season	Division	Apps	Goals	Apps	Goals	Apps	Goals	Apps	Goals	Apps	Goals
Arema	2019	Liga 1	0	0	0	0	–		0	0	0	0
Arema	2020	Liga 1	1	0	0	0	–		0	0	1	0
Bhayangkara	2021–22	Liga 1	8	0	0	0	–		1 (Note: Appearances in Menpora Cup)	0	9	0
Bhayangkara	2022–23	Liga 1	18	3	0	0	–		0	0	18	3
Bhayangkara	2023–24	Liga 1	14	1	0	0	–		0	0	14	1
Bhayangkara	2024–25	Liga 2	1	0	0	0	–		0	0	1	0
Bhayangkara	2025–26	Super League	4	0	0	0	–		0	0	4	0
Bhayangkara	Total		45	4	0	0	0	0	1	0	46	4
Bekasi City (loan)	2024–25	Liga 2	7	3	0	0	–		0	0	7	3
Persela Lamongan (loan)	2025–26	Championship	9	4	0	0	–		0	0	9	4
de Red	2026–27	Championship	1	0	0	0	–		0	0	1	0
Career total			64	11	0	0	0	0	2	0	66	11

=== International goals ===
International under-23 goals

Goal	Date	Venue	Opponent	Score	Result	Competition
1.	4 May 2023	Olympic Stadium, Phnom Penh, Cambodia	Myanmar	5–0	5–0	2023 Southeast Asian Games
2.	10 May 2023	Olympic Stadium, Phnom Penh, Cambodia	Cambodia	0–1	1–2	2023 Southeast Asian Games

== Honours ==
=== Club ===
Arema

- Indonesia President's Cup: 2019

=== International ===
Indonesia U-23

- SEA Games gold medal: 2023
