= Huỳnh Công Đến =

Vietnamese footballer (born 2001)

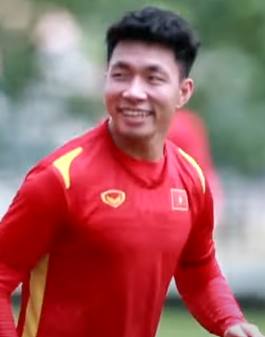
- Huỳnh Công Đến in 2022

Personal information
- Full name: Huỳnh Công Đến
- Date of birth: 19 August 2001 (age 25)
- Place of birth: Quy Nhơn, Bình Định, Vietnam
- Height: 1.63 m (5 ft 4 in)
- Position: Midfielder

Team information
- Current team: Công An Nhân Dân
- Number: 88

Youth career
- 2012–2020: PVF

Senior career*
Years	Team	Apps	(Gls)
2019–	Công An Nhân Dân	86	(8)
2020–2021	→ SHB Đà Nẵng (loan)	7	(0)

International career^{‡}
2017–2019	Vietnam U19	8	(1)
2021–2024	Vietnam U23	25	(0)
Medal record
Men's football
Representing Vietnam
SEA Games
Gold medal – first place	Hanoi 2021	Team
Bronze medal – third place	Phnom Penh 2023	Team
- * Club domestic league appearances and goals as of 12 June 2026 ‡ National team caps and goals as of 2 April 2024

Huỳnh Công Đến (born 19 August 2001) is a Vietnamese professional footballer who plays as a midfielder for V.League 2 side Công An Nhân Dân.

== International goals ==
=== Vietnam U19 ===
No.	Date	Venue	Opponent	Score	Result	Competition
1.	12 October 2019	Bangkok, Thailand	Thailand	1–0	1–0	GSB Bangkok Cup 2019

== Honours ==
Vietnam U23

- SEA Games gold medal: 2021; bronze medal: 2023
