= Đoàn Huy Hoàng =

Vietnamese footballer (born 2003)

Personal information
- Full name: Đoàn Huy Hoàng
- Date of birth: 18 June 2003 (age 23)
- Place of birth: Quỳnh Phụ, Thái Bình, Vietnam
- Height: 1.77 m (5 ft 10 in)
- Position: Goalkeeper

Team information
- Current team: Bắc Ninh
- Number: 1

Youth career
- 2019–2023: Viettel

Senior career*
Years	Team	Apps	(Gls)
2023–	Thể Công-Viettel	0	(0)
2023–2024	→ Trường Tươi Bình Phước (loan)	10	(0)
2024–	→ Bắc Ninh (loan)	2	(0)

International career^{‡}
2021–2023	Vietnam U20	6	(0)
2023–	Vietnam U23	4	(0)
Medal record
Men's football
Representing Vietnam
SEA Games
Bronze medal – third place	Phnom Penh 2023	Team
- * Club domestic league appearances and goals as of 12 June 2026 ‡ National team caps and goals as of 31 October 2023

Đoàn Huy Hoàng (born 18 June 2003) is a Vietnamese professional footballer who plays as a goalkeeper for V.League 1 club Bắc Ninh, on loan from Thể Công-Viettel.

== Early career ==
Born in Thái Bình, Huy Hoàng joined the youth academy of Viettel at an early age. He started his career operating as a centre back, but was later trained to becoming a goalkeeper after displaying good reflexion ability during a youth tournament.

He gained recognition after his outstanding performances in the 2020 Vietnamese U-17 Football Championship, helping Viettel finish runner-up. Therefore, Huy Hoàng was named as the tournament's "Best Goalkeeper".

In 2022, Huy Hoàng was part of the Viettel squad that reached the Vietnamese U-19 Football Championship final, where they were defeated by Hà Nội. With several important saves during the tournament, Huy Hoàng was named as the "Best goalkeeper of the tournament".

== Club career ==
For the 2023 V.League 1 season, Huy Hoàng was promoted to Viettel's first team.

In October 2023, he was loaned to V.League 2 team Trường Tươi Bình Phước. On 21 October 2023, he made his professional debut in a 1–1 V.League 2 game against Hòa Bình.

In September 2024, Huy Hoàng joined Vietnamese Second Division side Bắc Ninh in a one-season loan deal.

== International career ==
In April 2023, Huy Hoàng was named in Vietnam U23 final 20-men squad for the 2023 SEA Games. He made 2 appearances during the tournament, in the group stage game against Thailand and in the bronze medal game against Myanmar.

== Honours ==
Vietnam U15

- AFF U-15 Championship: 2017

Vietnam U19

- International Thanh Niên Newspaper Cup: 2022

Vietnam U23

- SEA Games Bronze medal: 2023

Individual

- Vietnamese U-17 Football Championship Best Goalkeeper: 2020
- Vietnamese U-19 Football Championship Best Goalkeeper: 2022
