= Lê Quốc Nhật Nam =

Vietnamese footballer (born 2001)

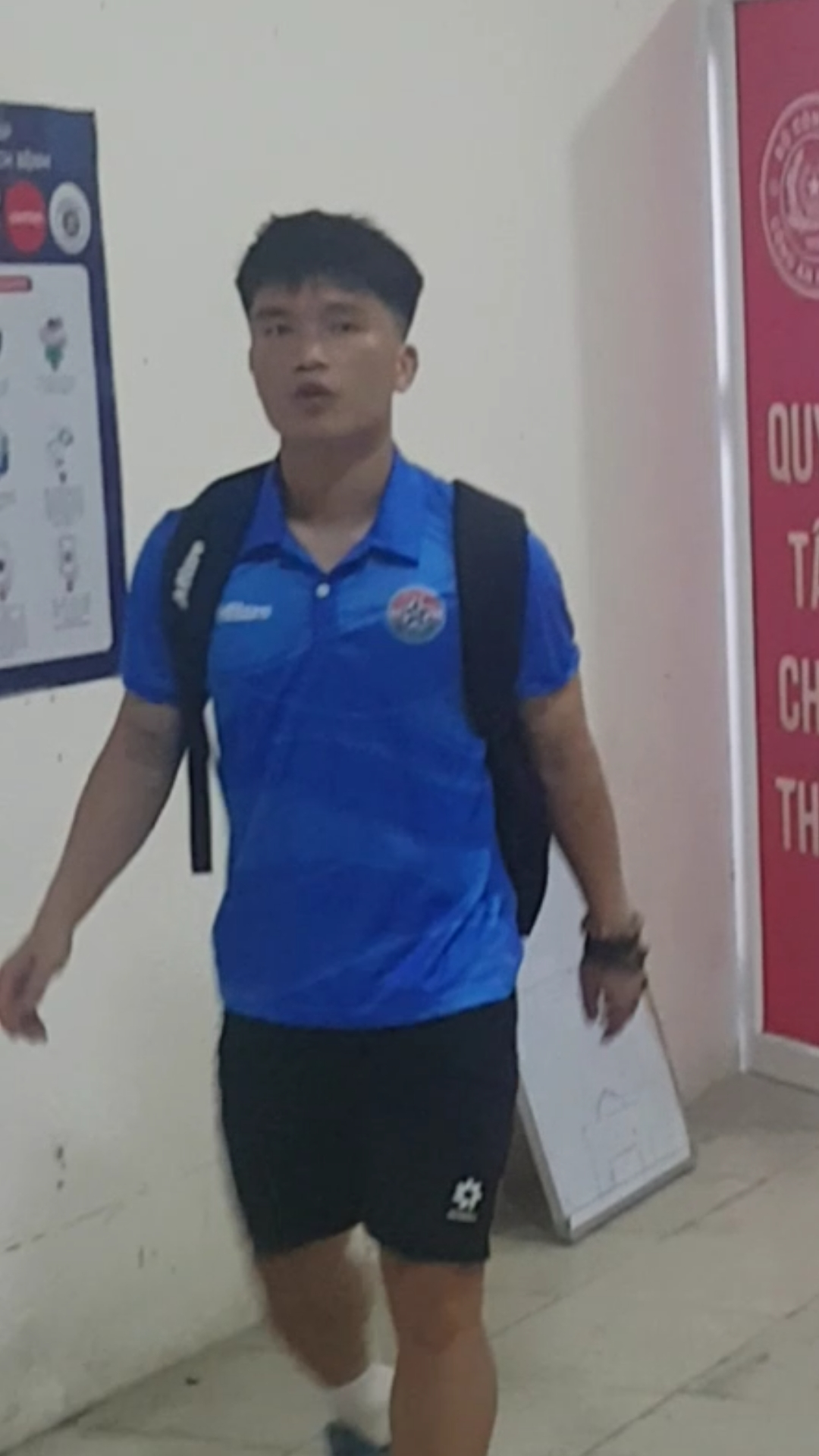
- Nhật Nam in 2024

Personal information
- Full name: Lê Quốc Nhật Nam
- Date of birth: 23 March 2001 (age 25)
- Place of birth: Kỳ Anh, Hà Tĩnh, Vietnam
- Height: 1.66 m (5 ft 5 in)
- Position: Midfielder

Team information
- Current team: Thể Công-Viettel
- Number: 89

Youth career
- 2012–2021: Viettel

Senior career*
Years	Team	Apps	(Gls)
2021–	Thể Công-Viettel	31	(3)
2021–2023	→ Huế (loan)	39	(5)
2023–2024	→ PVF-CAND (loan)	19	(0)

International career^{‡}
2018–2019	Vietnam U17	5	(0)
2023–2024	Vietnam U23	8	(2)
2026–	Vietnam	1	(0)
Medal record
Men's football
Representing Vietnam
SEA Games
Bronze medal – third place	Phnom Penh 2023	Team
- * Club domestic league appearances and goals as of 20 November 2026 ‡ National team caps and goals as of 17 November 2026

Lê Quốc Nhật Nam (born 23 March 2001) is a Vietnamese professional footballer who plays as a midfielder for V.League 1 club Thể Công-Viettel and the Vietnam national team.

== Club career ==
Nhật Nam was discovered by coach Hồ Sỹ Phúc after his great performances at a youth football tournament in Hà Tĩnh. In 2012, he was admitted to Viettel youth academy after the enrollment period that year. In 2018, he won the Vietnamese National U-17 Football Championship with Viettel U17 as the team's vice captain. In 2020, Nhật Nam played a crucial role on Viettel U21's successful campaign in Vietnamese National U-21 Football Championship, leading the team winning the competition.

In 2021, Nhật Nam joined V.League 2 side Huế on a long-term loan deal. He spent two seasons at the club, before being loaned to PVF-CAND, another team playing at the V.League 2.

== International career ==
Nhật Nam was named by coach Philippe Troussier on Vietnam under-22 squad for the 2023 SEA Games. He scored a goal during the tournament against Thailand in the group stage from a long range shot.

In November 2026, Nhật Nam received his first call-up to the Vietnam national team, being named in the squad for the friendly tournament Casper Cup.

== Honours ==
Vietnam U23

- SEA Games bronze medal: 2023
