= Nguyễn Thái Sơn =

Vietnamese footballer

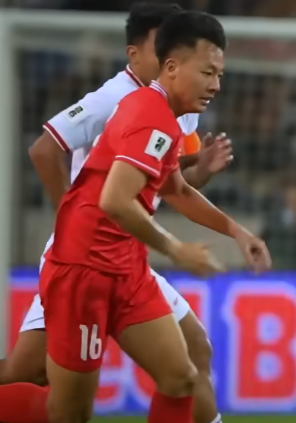
- Thái Sơn in 2024

Personal information
- Full name: Nguyễn Thái Sơn
- Date of birth: 13 July 2003 (age 23)
- Place of birth: Như Xuân, Thanh Hóa, Vietnam
- Height: 1.71 m (5 ft 7 in)
- Position: Defensive midfielder

Team information
- Current team: Ninh Bình
- Number: 21

Youth career
- 2013–2022: Thanh Hóa

Senior career*
Years	Team	Apps	(Gls)
2022–2026	Đông Á Thanh Hóa	77	(3)
2026–	Ninh Bình	1	(0)

International career^{‡}
2019–2022	Vietnam U20	6	(0)
2023–2026	Vietnam U23	40	(1)
2023–	Vietnam	13	(0)
Medal record
Men's football
Representing Vietnam
SEA Games
Bronze medal – third place	Phnom Penh 2023	Team
AFC U-23 Asian Cup
Third place	Saudi Arabia 2026
ASEAN U-23 Championship
Winner	Indonesia 2025
- * Club domestic league appearances and goals as of 2 February 2026 ‡ National team caps and goals as of 23 January 2026

Nguyễn Thái Sơn (born 13 July 2003) is a Vietnamese professional footballer who plays as a defensive midfielder for V.League 1 club Ninh Bình and the Vietnam national team.

== Club career ==
Born in Thanh Hóa, Thái Sơn was formed by his local team Đông Á Thanh Hóa. He made his professional debut for Đông Á Thanh Hóa on 4 November 2022 as a 72nd-minute substitute for Hoang Dinh Tung, and scored the final goal of a 1–1 draw with Hanoi FC.

In the 2023 V.League 1 season, Thái Sơn appeared in 15 games, playing a big role to help Thanh Hóa finish fourth in the league. He also contributed in the club's victorious campaign in the 2023 Vietnamese Cup. Thanks his consistent good form throughout the year, Thái Sơn was given the V.League 1 Young Player of the Season award and was named as the Vietnamese Young Player of the Year.

On 13 January 2025, Thái Sơn was transferred to V.League 1 fellow Ninh Bình.

== International career ==
In April 2023, Thái Sơn was named by coach Philippe Troussier on Vietnam U22 squad for the 2023 Southeast Asian Games. He scored a goal in the second group stage match against Singapore.

On 18 June 2023, Thái Sơn was called up to the senior Vietnam squad for the first time for friendlies against Syria and later made his international debut against the opponent.

In January 2024, he featured in Vietnam's 26-men squad for the 2023 AFC Asian Cup.

== Playing style ==
Thái Sơn is capable of playing in several midfield positions or as a winger. He is known for his stamina and ability to cover large areas of the pitch, contributing to both defensive and attacking play.

== Career statistics ==
=== Club ===
As of match played 2 February 2026

Appearances and goals by club, season and competition
Club	Season	League			Cup		Other		Total	
Club	Season	Division	Apps	Goals	Apps	Goals	Apps	Goals	Apps	Goals
Đông Á Thanh Hóa	2022	V.League 1	4	2	1	0	—		5	2
Đông Á Thanh Hóa	2023	V.League 1	15	0	4	0	—		19	0
Đông Á Thanh Hóa	2023–24	V.League 1	24	0	4	0	1 (Note: Appearance in Vietnamese Super Cup)	0	29	0
Đông Á Thanh Hóa	2024–25	V.League 1	25	1	1	0	6 (Note: One appearance in Vietnamese Super Cup, five appearances in ASEAN Club Championship)	0	32	1
Đông Á Thanh Hóa	2025–26	V.League 1	9	0	1	0	—		10	0
Đông Á Thanh Hóa	Total		77	3	11	0	7	0	95	3
Ninh Bình	2025–26	V.League 1	1	0	0	0	—		1	0
Career total			78	3	11	0	7	0	96	3

=== International ===
As of match played 12 October 2024

Appearances and goals by national team and year
National team	Years	Apps	Goals
Vietnam	2023	6	0
Vietnam	2024	7	0
Total		13	0

== Honours ==
Đông Á Thanh Hóa

- Vietnamese Cup: 2023, 2023–24
- Vietnamese Super Cup: 2023

Vietnam U19

- International Thanh Niên Newspaper Cup: 2022

Vietnam U23

- SEA Games gold medal: 2025; bronze medal: 2023
- ASEAN U-23 Championship: 2025
- AFC U-23 Asian Cup third place: 2026

Individual

- V.League 1 Young Player of the Season: 2023
- Vietnamese Young Player of the Year: 2023
