= Lương Duy Cương =

Vietnamese footballer (born 2001)

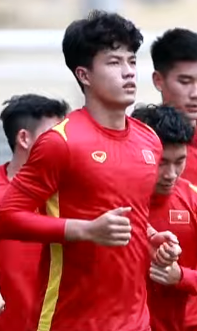
- Duy Cương in 2022

Personal information
- Full name: Lương Duy Cương
- Date of birth: 7 November 2001 (age 25)
- Place of birth: Đại Từ, Thái Nguyên, Vietnam
- Height: 1.82 m (6 ft 0 in)
- Positions: Centre back; right back

Team information
- Current team: SHB Đà Nẵng
- Number: 20

Youth career
- 2016–2021: SHB Đà Nẵng

Senior career*
Years	Team	Apps	(Gls)
2021–	SHB Đà Nẵng	90	(1)

International career^{‡}
2022–2024	Vietnam U23	32	(0)
2022–	Vietnam	1	(0)
Medal record
Men's football
Representing Vietnam
AFF U-23 Championship
Winner	Cambodia 2022
Winner	Thailand 2023
SEA Games
Gold medal – first place	Hanoi 2021	Team
Bronze medal – third place	Phnom Penh 2023	Team
- * Club domestic league appearances and goals as of 7 June 2026 ‡ National team caps and goals as of 21 September 2022

Lương Duy Cương (born 7 November 2001) is a Vietnamese professional footballer who plays as a centre back or a right back for V.League 1 club SHB Đà Nẵng and the Vietnam national team.

At the 2022 AFC U-23 Asian Cup, he was also used as a defensive midfielder.

== Career statistics ==
=== Club ===
As of match played 27 June 2025

Appearances and goals by club, season and competition
Club	Season	League			Vietnamese Cup		Other		Total	
Club	Season	Division	Apps	Goals	Apps	Goals	Apps	Goals	Apps	Goals
SHB Da Nang	2021	V.League 1	0	0	0	0	—		0	0
SHB Da Nang	2022	V.League 1	18	0	0	0	—		18	0
SHB Da Nang	2023	V.League 1	16	0	1	0	—		17	0
SHB Da Nang	2023–24	V.League 2	19	1	1	0	—		20	1
SHB Da Nang	2024–25	V.League 1	25	0	1	0	1 (Note: Appearance in V.League 1 relegation play-offs)	0	27	1
Career total			78	1	3	0	1	0	82	1

=== International ===
As of match played 21 September 2022

National team	Year	Apps	Goals
Vietnam
Vietnam	2022	1	0
Total		1	0

== Honours ==
SHB Đà Nẵng

- V.League 2: 2023–24

Vietnam U23

- AFF U-23 Championship: 2022, 2023
- SEA Games gold medal: 2021; bronze medal: 2023

Vietnam

- VFF Cup: 2022

Individual

- AFF U-23 Championship Team of the Tournament: 2023
