= Fajar Fathur Rahman =

Indonesian footballer

Personal information
- Full name: Muhammad Fajar Fathur Rahman Ahmad
- Date of birth: 29 May 2002 (age 24)
- Place of birth: Manokwari, Indonesia
- Height: 1.71 m (5 ft 7 in)
- Positions: Right-back; winger

Team information
- Current team: Persija Jakarta
- Number: 4

Youth career
- –2018: Bina Taruna
- 2018: PSSA Asahan
- 2018: Persib
- 2018: Garuda Select
- 2019–2020: Kalteng Putra
- 2020: ASAD 313

Senior career*
Years	Team	Apps	(Gls)
2020–2025	Borneo Samarinda	117	(2)
2026–	Persija Jakarta	11	(0)

International career^{‡}
2018	Indonesia U16	7	(2)
2019–2020	Indonesia U19	5	(2)
2023–2024	Indonesia U23	15	(5)
Medal record
Men's football
Representing Indonesia
AFF U-16 Youth Championship
Winner	2018 Indonesia
AFF U-19 Youth Championship
Third place	2019 Vietnam
Southeast Asian Games
Gold medal – first place	2023 Cambodia	Team
- * Club domestic league appearances and goals as of 22 April 2026 ‡ National team caps and goals as of 2 May 2024

Muhammad Fajar Fathur Rahman Ahmad (born 29 May 2002) is an Indonesian professional footballer who plays as a right-back or a winger for Super League club Persija Jakarta.

== Club career ==
=== Borneo Samarinda ===
He was signed for Borneo to play in Liga 1 in the 2021 season. Fajar made his professional debut on 4 September 2021 in a match against Persebaya Surabaya at the Wibawa Mukti Stadium, Cikarang.

== International career ==
On 29 July 2018, Fajar started to represent Indonesia from the age of 16 when he debuted in an Indonesia U16 team match against Philippines U16 in the 2018 AFF U-16 Youth Championship, he also scored his first international goal in that debut that ended with a 8–0 win. On 11 August, he scored the opening goal for Indonesia in a 1–1 final match against Thailand U17, Until winning the penalty-shootout, he successfully led Indonesia to become the winner of 2018 AFF U-16 Youth Championship.

Then in 2019, he moved up to the U19 national team, and scored 2 goals in the group stage of the 2019 AFF U-18 Youth Championship. And became the third-place of this tournament.

In April 2023, Fajar was called up to the Indonesia U22 for the training centre in preparation for the 2023 SEA Games. Fajar made his international U22 debut on 14 April 2023 in a friendly match against Lebanon U22 at the Gelora Bung Karno Stadium, Jakarta. Fajar then went on to score 5 goals in 7 appearances for Indonesia U22, making him the joint top scorer and winning the gold medal in the 2023 SEA Games football tournament.

== Career statistics ==
=== Club ===
As of 22 April 2026.

Club	Season	League			Cup		Continental		Other		Total	
Club	Season	Division	Apps	Goals	Apps	Goals	Apps	Goals	Apps	Goals	Apps	Goals
Borneo Samarinda	2021–22	Liga 1	11	0	0	0	–		3 (Note: Appearances in Menpora Cup)	0	14	0
Borneo Samarinda	2022–23	Liga 1	25	2	0	0	–		7	0	32	2
Borneo Samarinda	2023–24	Liga 1	34	0	0	0	–		0	0	34	0
Borneo Samarinda	2024–25	Liga 1	33	0	0	0	–		5 (Note: Appearances in ASEAN Club Championship)	0	38	0
Borneo Samarinda	2025–26	Super League	14	0	0	0	–		0	0	14	0
Borneo Samarinda	Total		117	2	0	0	—		15	0	132	2
Persija Jakarta	2025–26	Super League	11	0	0	0	–		0	0	11	0
Career total			128	2	0	0	0	0	15	0	143	2

=== International goals ===
International under-23 goals

Goal	Date	Venue	Opponent	Score	Result	Competition
1.	29 April 2023	Olympic Stadium, Phnom Penh, Cambodia	Philippines	3–0	3–0	2023 Southeast Asian Games
2.	4 May 2023	Olympic Stadium, Phnom Penh, Cambodia	Myanmar	4–0	5–0	2023 Southeast Asian Games
3.	7 May 2023	Olympic Stadium, Phnom Penh, Cambodia	Timor-Leste	2–0	3–0	2023 Southeast Asian Games
4.	7 May 2023	Olympic Stadium, Phnom Penh, Cambodia	Timor-Leste	3–0	3–0	2023 Southeast Asian Games
5.	16 May 2023	Olympic Stadium, Phnom Penh, Cambodia	Thailand	4–2	5–2	2023 Southeast Asian Games

== Honours ==
Borneo Samarinda

- Piala Presiden runner-up: 2022, 2024

Indonesia U-16

- AFF U-16 Youth Championship: 2018

Indonesia U-19

- AFF U-19 Youth Championship third place: 2019

Indonesia U-23

- SEA Games gold medal: 2023

Individual

- Piala Presiden Best Young Player: 2022
- Liga 1 Young Player of the Month: March 2023, October 2023
- Southeast Asian Games Top scorer: 2023
- Liga 1 Best Young Player: 2023–24
- Liga 1 Team of the Season: 2023–24, 2024–25
- APPI Indonesian Football Award Best Young Player: 2023–24
- APPI Indonesian Football Award Best XI: 2023–24
