= Hồ Văn Cường =

Vietnamese footballer (born 2003)

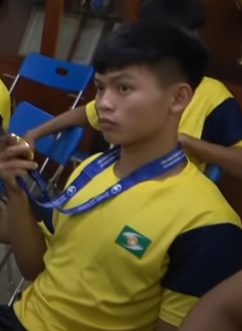
- Văn Cường in 2020

Personal information
- Full name: Hồ Văn Cường
- Date of birth: 15 January 2003 (age 23)
- Place of birth: Hoàng Mai, Nghệ An, Vietnam
- Height: 1.67 m (5 ft 6 in)
- Position: Right back

Team information
- Current team: Sông Lam Nghệ An
- Number: 30

Youth career
- 2013–2019: PVF
- 2019–2022: Sông Lam Nghệ An

Senior career*
Years	Team	Apps	(Gls)
2022–	Sông Lam Nghệ An	58	(0)
2023–2024	→ Công An Hà Nội (loan)	12	(0)

International career^{‡}
2018–2019	Vietnam U17	3	(0)
2022–2023	Vietnam U20	6	(0)
2022–2024	Vietnam U23	18	(3)
2023–	Vietnam	3	(0)
Medal record
Men's football
Representing Vietnam
AFF U-23 Championship
Winner	Cambodia 2022
SEA Games
Bronze medal – third place	Phnom Penh 2023	Team
- * Club domestic league appearances and goals as of 23 October 2025 ‡ National team caps and goals as of 25 March 2025

Hồ Văn Cường (born 15 January 2003) is a Vietnamese professional footballer who plays as a right back for V.League 1 club Sông Lam Nghệ An.

== Club career ==
Văn Cường started his football career at PVF Football Academy. In 2019, he was released from PVF because he was considered too small to play football. Văn Cường then joined the youth team of his local Sông Lam Nghệ An. Following his good performances at the 2021 Vietnamese National U-19 Football Championship, Văn Cường was promoted to Sông Lam Nghệ An first team for the 2022 season. Văn Cường became the main starter right-back of the team right on his first season and helped his club finishing fifth in the league.

In September 2023, Văn Cường joined Công An Hà Nội in a one-season loan deal.

== International career ==
Văn Cường was named in the under-23 squad for the 2022 AFF U-23 Championship. He made only one appearance in the group stage before forfeiting the rest of the tournament due to the COVID-19 pandemic. Vietnam under-23 ended up winning the tournament.

In 2023, Văn Cường was called up to the under-20 team for the 2023 AFC U-20 Championship and played in all three group matches as his team was eliminated. He later represented Vietnam at the 2023 SEA Games, scoring twice in the bronze medal match against Myanmar under-22s.

== Honours ==
Vietnam U-23

- AFF U-23 Championship: 2022
- SEA Games: Bronze medal: (bronze) 2023
