= Nguyễn Văn Tùng =

Vietnamese footballer (born 2001)

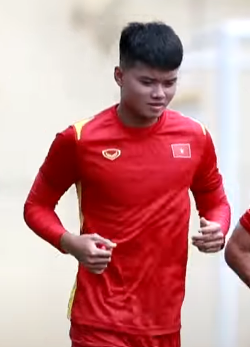
- Văn Tùng training with Vietnam U23 in 2022

Personal information
- Full name: Nguyễn Văn Tùng
- Date of birth: 2 June 2001 (age 25)
- Place of birth: Gia Lâm, Hanoi, Vietnam
- Height: 1.80 m (5 ft 11 in)
- Position: Striker

Team information
- Current team: Hà Nội
- Number: 23

Youth career
- 2015–2021: Hà Nội

Senior career*
Years	Team	Apps	(Gls)
2018–2020	→ Phú Thọ (loan)		
2022–	Hà Nội	66	(8)

International career^{‡}
2019–2021	Vietnam U19	6	(2)
2022–2024	Vietnam U23	28	(12)
2023–	Vietnam	7	(0)
Medal record
Men's football
Representing Vietnam
AFF U-23 Championship
Winner	Cambodia 2022
SEA Games
Gold medal – first place	Hanoi 2021	Team
Bronze medal – third place	Phnom Penh 2023	Team
- * Club domestic league appearances and goals as of 21 November 2026 ‡ National team caps and goals as of 17 November 2026

Nguyễn Văn Tùng (born 2 June 2001) is a Vietnamese professional footballer who plays as a striker for V.League 1 club Hà Nội and the Vietnam national team.

== Club career ==
=== Early career ===
Văn Tùng initiated his football journey at the Gia Lâm Sports Center of the Hà Nội football academy. After a brief stint with the U16 Hà Nội team, his career faced a two-year interruption due to injury. In 2019, he returned to the U19 Hà Nội squad, scoring 6 goals in 5 matches and helping the team clinch the U19 National Championship.

=== Hà Nội ===
On 26 June 2022, Văn Tùng was named on the substitutes bench for a match against Nam Định in the V.League 1. He made his competitive debut for the club on 3 July in a V.League 1 match against SHB Đà Nẵng. Văn Tùng was replaced by Phạm Tuấn Hải in the 86th minute as his team lost 2–1. He scored his first goal for the club at the 2022 Vietnamese Cup quarter-finals against Bình Phước which ended 5–0 for Hà Nội.

On 27 May 2023, Văn Tùng scored his first V.League 1 goal in a 1–1 away draw at Becamex Bình Dương.

== International career ==
In 2019, Văn Tùng was called up by coach Philippe Troussier to the Vietnam U-19 national team for the 2020 AFC U-19 Championship qualifiers. At the AFF U-23 Championship, he scored 2 goals in his debut match for Vietnam U-23 against Singapore U-23. At the 2023 SEA Games, Văn Tùng scored 5 goals and became the top scorer, but the Vietnam U-22 team only secured a bronze medal after being eliminated early in the semifinals by Indonesia U-22.

Văn Tùng was called up to the senior Vietnam squad for the first time to face Hong Kong and Syria in June 2023. He made his Vietnam senior team debut on 15 June 2023 against the former at the Lạch Tray Stadium.

In January 2024, he was included in Vietnam's 26-men squad for the 2023 AFC Asian Cup.

== Career statistics ==
=== Club ===
As of match played 21 November 2026

Appearances and goals by club, season and competition
Club	Season	League			Cup		Continental		Other		Total	
Club	Season	Division	Apps	Goals	Apps	Goals	Apps	Goals	Apps	Goals	Apps	Goals
Hà Nội	2022	V.League 1	9	0	3	1	—		—		12	1
Hà Nội	2023	V.League 1	10	1	1	0	—		0	0	11	1
Hà Nội	2023–24	V.League 1	16	1	2	0	3 (Note: Appearance in AFC Champions League)	0	—		21	1
Hà Nội	2024–25	V.League 1	12	2	1	0	—		—		13	1
Hà Nội	2025–26	V.League 1	11	2	0	0	—		—		11	2
Hà Nội	2026–27	V.League 1	8	2	1	0	—		—		9	2
Total career			66	8	8	1	3	0	0	0	77	9

=== International ===
As of match played 17 November 2026

National team	Years	Apps	Goals
Vietnam	2023	3	0
Vietnam	2024	2	0
Vietnam	2026	2	0
Total		7	0

=== International goals ===
Vietnam U19

No.	Date	Venue	Opponent	Score	Result	Competition
1.	6 November 2019	Hồ Chí Minh City, Vietnam	Mongolia	3–0	3–0	2020 AFC U-19 Championship qualification

Vietnam U23

#	Date	Venue	Opponent	Score	Result	Competition
1.	19 February 2022	Phnom Penh, Cambodia	Singapore	1–0	7–0	2022 AFF U-23 Youth Championship
2.	19 February 2022	Phnom Penh, Cambodia	Singapore	3–0	7–0	2022 AFF U-23 Youth Championship
3.	22 April 2022	Hanoi, Vietnam	South Korea U-20	1–0	1–0	Friendly
4.	15 May 2022	Phu Tho, Vietnam	Timor-Leste	1–0	2–0	2021 Southeast Asian Games
5.	5 June 2022	Tashkent, Uzbekistan	Thailand	2–1	2–2	2022 AFC U-23 Asian Cup
6.	30 April 2023	Phnom Penh, Cambodia	Laos	1–0	2–0	2023 SEA Games
7.	3 May 2023	Phnom Penh, Cambodia	Singapore	1–0	3–1	2023 SEA Games
8.	8 May 2023	Phnom Penh, Cambodia	Malaysia	1–0	2–1	2023 SEA Games
9.	8 May 2023	Phnom Penh, Cambodia	Malaysia	2–0	2–1	2023 SEA Games
10.	13 May 2023	Phnom Penh, Cambodia	Indonesia	1–1	2–3	2023 SEA Games
11.	6 September 2023	Phu Tho, Vietnam	Guam	2–0	6–0	2024 AFC U-23 Asian Cup qualification
12.	17 April 2024	Al Wakrah, Qatar	Kuwait	1–0	3–1	2024 AFC U-23 Asian Cup

== Honours ==
Hà Nội

- V.League 1: 2022
- Vietnamese National Cup: 2022

Vietnam U23

- AFF U-23 Championship: 2022
- SEA Games gold medal: 2021; bronze medal: 2023

Individual

- SEA Games top scorer: 2023
