= Leon James (footballer) =

Thai footballer

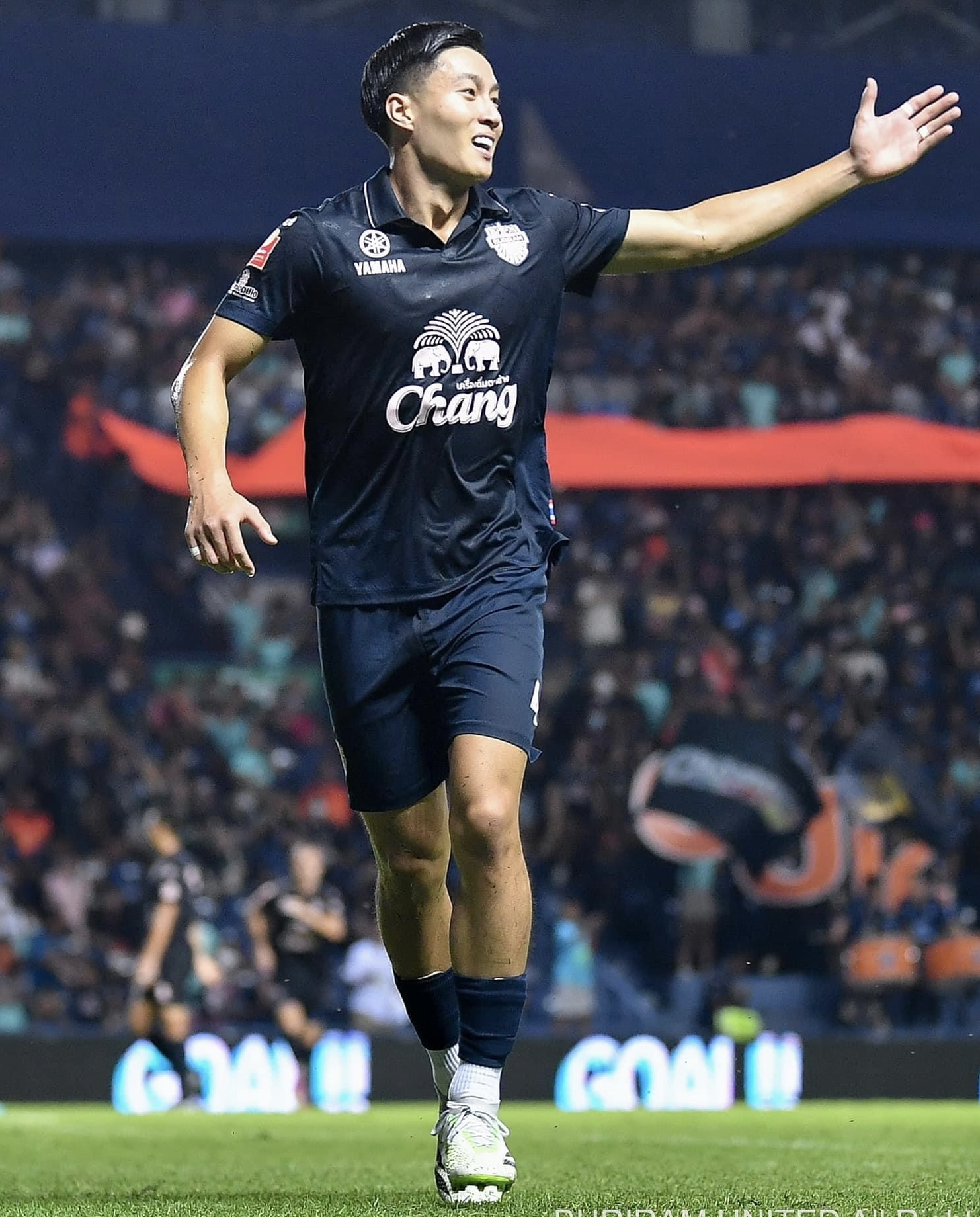
- Leon James scoring on his Debut for Buriram United.

Personal information
- Full name: Leon Pitchaya James
- Date of birth: 29 August 2001 (age 25)
- Place of birth: Coventry, England
- Height: 1.83 m (6 ft 0 in)
- Position: Midfielder

Team information
- Current team: BG Pathum United

Youth career
- 2007–2019: Leicester City

Senior career*
Years	Team	Apps	(Gls)
2019–2020	Ratchaburi Mitr Phol	1	(0)
2020–2022	Sukhothai	40	(2)
2022–2023	Nongbua Pitchaya	20	(0)
2023–2026	Buriram United	7	(1)
2024	→ Chonburi (loan)	9	(1)
2025	→ Uthai Thani (loan)	9	(0)
2026	→ Nakhon Ratchasima (loan)	14	(2)
2026–	BG Pathum United	0	(0)

International career^{‡}
2019	Thailand U19	3	(0)
2022–2024	Thailand U23	11	(1)
- * Club domestic league appearances and goals as of 10 May 2026 (UTC) ‡ National team caps and goals as of 13 May 2023

Leon Pitchaya James (Thai: ลีออน พิชญ เจมส์; born 29 August 2001) is a professional footballer born and raised in England who plays as a midfielder for Thai League 1 club BG Pathum United. Born in England, he represents Thailand at youth level.

James spent 12 years playing for Leicester City being the first ever Thailand national to sign a scholarship in England. He competed in various competitions, reaching the quarter-finals of the FA Youth Cup, before deciding to part ways with Leicester City to move to Thailand to sign his first professional contract for Thai Premier League club Ratchaburi Mitr Phol. James made an appearance in the Chang FA Cup.

James signed his second contract in Thailand for Sukhothai.

== Club career ==
=== Leicester City ===
James joined the Leicester City academy at age six, and progressed through the various age groups for the following 11 seasons. In his final year with the club, his under-19 squad reached the quarterfinals of the 2018–19 FA Youth Cup.

=== Ratchaburi Mitr Phol ===
In December 2019, James completed a move to Ratchaburi Mitr Phol in the Thai League 1.

=== Sukhothai ===
On 4 December 2020, it was announced that James had joined club Sukhothai.

=== Nongbua Pitchaya ===
On 1 June 2022, it was announced that James had joined club Nongbua Pitchaya.

== International career ==
In March 2019, James was called up to the Thailand U19 first time for VFF International Tournament. In October 2019, James was in the squad of Thailand U19 for GSB Bangkok Cup 2019, but did not make an appearance.

In December 2022, James was called up to the Thailand U23 national team for a training camp held from 5–15 December 2022 and for the friendly matches against Laos.

== Honours ==
=== Club ===
Buriram United

- Thai League 1: 2023–24, 2024–25
- Thai FA Cup: 2024–25
- Thai League Cup: 2024–25
- ASEAN Club Championship: 2024–25
- Thailand Champions Cup runner-up: 2023

=== International ===
Thailand U23

- SEA Games (silver) Silver medal: 2023
