= Chou Sinti =

Cambodian footballer (born 2003)

Personal information
- Full name: Chou Sinti
- Date of birth: 2 April 2003 (age 23)
- Place of birth: Battambang Province, Cambodia
- Height: 1.60 m (5 ft 3 in)
- Position: Central midfielder

Team information
- Current team: Preah Khan Reach Svay Rieng
- Number: 25

Youth career
- Bati Academy

Senior career*
Years	Team	Apps	(Gls)
2021–	Preah Khan Reach Svay Rieng	73	(1)

International career^{‡}
2019	Cambodia U19		
2022–2025	Cambodia U23	5	(2)
2022–	Cambodia	3	(0)
- * Club domestic league appearances and goals as of 9 November 2026 ‡ National team caps and goals as of 14:00, 6 June 2025 (UTC)

Chou Sinti (Khmer: ជូ ស៊ីនទី; born 2 April 2003) is a Cambodian professional footballer who plays as a central midfielder for Cambodian Premier League club Preah Khan Reach Svay Rieng and the Cambodia national team.

== Career ==
Sinti joined Bati Youth Football Academy in 2016. He previously played for Victory Poipet football club.

Sinti first call up to the national team was to play in an AFC Asian Cup qualifiers game away against India, which Cambodia lost 2–0. The next game Sinti took part in was against Afghanistan where Cambodia fought back to a 2–2 draw.
