= Achitpol Keereerom =

Thai footballer (born 2001)

Personal information
- Full name: Achitpol Keereerom
- Date of birth: 21 October 2001 (age 25)
- Place of birth: Bangkok, Thailand
- Height: 1.81 m (5 ft 11 in)
- Position: Forward

Team information
- Current team: SSV Ulm
- Number: 29

Youth career
- 2010–2012: Bangkok Christian College
- 2013–2014: Assumption College Thonburi
- 2015: SV Nettelnburg/Allermöhe
- 2016–2017: DFI Bad Aibling
- 2018–2019: TSV 1860 Rosenheim

Senior career*
Years	Team	Apps	(Gls)
2019–2021	TSV 1860 Rosenheim	7	(3)
2021–2024	FC Augsburg II	28	(6)
2024–2026	Schwaben Augsburg	65	(16)
2026–	SSV Ulm	0	(0)

International career^{‡}
2019	Thailand U18	9	(6)
2023	Thailand U22	5	(2)
2022–2023	Thailand U23	5	(0)
- * Club domestic league appearances and goals as of 05:26, 16 March 2026 (UTC) ‡ National team caps and goals as of 16 March 2026

Achitpol Keereerom (Thai: อชิตพล คีรีรมย์; born 21 October 2001) is a Thai professional footballer who plays as a forward for Regionalliga Südwest club SSV Ulm.

== International career ==
On 26 May 2022, Keereerom was called up to the Thailand U23 for the 2022 AFC U-23 Asian Cup.

== Career statistics ==
=== Club ===
As of match played 16 March 2026

Appearances and goals by club, season and competition
Club	Season	League			Cup		Total	
Club	Season	Division	Apps	Goals	Apps	Goals	Apps	Goals
TSV 1860 Rosenheim	2019–20	Regionalliga Bayern	0	0	—		0	0
TSV 1860 Rosenheim	2020–21	Regionalliga Bayern	7	3	3	3	10	6
Total			10	6	3	3	13	9
FC Augsburg II	2021–22	Regionalliga Bayern	9	3	—		9	3
FC Augsburg II	2022–23	Regionalliga Bayern	19	3	—		19	3
Total			28	6	—		28	6
TSV Schwaben Augsburg	2024–25	Regionalliga Bayern	29	6	—		29	6
TSV Schwaben Augsburg	2025–26	Regionalliga Bayern	34	9	—		34	9
Total			51	13	—		51	13
Career total			86	22	3	3	89	25

== Honours ==
=== International ===
Thailand U23

- SEA Games (silver) Silver medal: 2023
