= Dov Cariño =

Filipino footballer (born 2003)

Personal information
- Full name: Dov Anthony Misael Santico Cariño
- Date of birth: December 18, 2003 (age 22)
- Place of birth: San Juan, Metro Manila, Philippines
- Height: 1.77 m (5 ft 10 in)
- Positions: Forward; midfielder

Team information
- Current team: Ateneo de Manila University

Youth career
- Ateneo de Manila High School
- British International School, Phuket

College career
Years	Team	Apps	(Gls)
- Ateneo de Manila University

Senior career*
Years	Team	Apps	(Gls)
2022	Azkals Development Team		
2023	CF Manila		

International career^{‡}
2022	Philippines U19	4	(0)
2022	Philippines U20	3	(0)
2023	Philippines U22	5	(1)
2023–	Philippines U23	14	(1)
2024–	Philippines	1	(0)
- * Club domestic league appearances and goals ‡ National team caps and goals as of 22 September 2026

Dov Anthony Misael Santico Cariño (born December 18, 2003) is a Filipino professional footballer who plays as a Forward and midfielder for Ateneo de Manila University and the Philippines national team.

== Career statistics ==
=== International ===
As of match played 18 December 2024

Appearances and goals by national team and year
National team	Year	Apps	Goals
Philippines	2024	1	0
Total		1	0
