= Philippe Troussier =

French footballer and coach (born 1955)

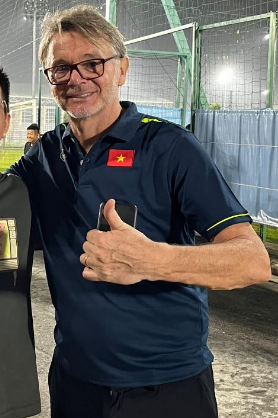
- Troussier in 2023 as the Vietnam manager

Personal information
- Full name: Philippe Bernard Victor Troussier
- Date of birth: 21 March 1955 (age 71)
- Place of birth: Paris, France
- Height: 1.83 m (6 ft 0 in)
- Position: Defender

Youth career
- 1974–1975: AS Choisy-le-Roi
- 1975–1976: RC Joinville

Senior career*
Years	Team	Apps	(Gls)
1976–1977	Angoulême	22	(0)
1977–1978	Red Star 93	3	(0)
1978–1981	Rouen	79	(8)
1981–1983	Reims	38	(0)
Total		142	(8)

Managerial career
- 1983–1984: INF Vichy
- 1984–1987: CS Alençon
- 1987–1989: Red Star 93
- 1989: Créteil
- 1989–1992: ASEC Mimosas
- 1993: Ivory Coast
- 1994: Kaizer Chiefs
- 1995–1997: FUS Rabat
- 1997: Nigeria
- 1997–1998: Burkina Faso
- 1998: South Africa
- 1998–2002: Japan
- 1999: Japan U20
- 2000: Japan U23
- 2003–2004: Qatar
- 2004–2005: Marseille
- 2005: Morocco
- 2007: FAR Rabat
- 2008–2010: Ryūkyū (sports director)
- 2011–2013: Shenzhen Ruby
- 2014: Sfaxien
- 2015: Hangzhou Greentown
- 2017–2018: Chongqing Liangjiang (Technical director)
- 2018–2021: PVF (Technical director)
- 2019–2021: Vietnam U19
- 2023–2024: Vietnam U23
- 2023–2024: Vietnam
Medal record
Men's football
Representing Japan (as manager)
AFC Asian Cup
Winner	2000
FIFA Confederations Cup
Runner-up	2001
Representing Vietnam (as manager)
SEA Games
Bronze medal – third place	2023
- * Club domestic league appearances and goals

Philippe Bernard Victor Troussier (French pronunciation: [filip tʁusje]; born 21 March 1955) is a French former association football player and manager.

After a modest playing career as a defender within the French leagues, he moved into management where he started out within the lower echelons of French football, however it was his move to Ivorian team ASEC Mimosas where he started to distinguish himself as a manager after winning several league titles with them. This would soon see him have a long association with African football and particularly their national teams, with Ivory Coast, Nigeria, South Africa and Burkina Faso being teams he managed. His international management career would continue with Japan where he had a successful spell with them by winning the 2000 AFC Asian Cup. Since then, he has returned to club management.

== Playing career ==
Troussier started his career in football as a player and would go on to become a professional with French Division 2 football club Angoulême in the 1976–77 league season. The following campaign he would leave to join Red Star 93, however his stay at the club was brief and he moved to Rouen. After several seasons with Rouen, Troussier's last professional club was Stade de Reims whom he played for until 1983. After having spent his whole professional career in the second division he moved into management.

== Coaching career ==
=== Early coaching career ===
Troussier soon moved into management after gaining his coaching licences and achieved his first coaching position with the French Football Federation where he was allowed to manage a National football centre football club called Institut National du Football de Vichy or more commonly known as INF Vichy. The team were allowed to participate in the third tier and given exemption from promotion or relegation so the young players could develop. In his time with the team he led them into the 1983–84 league season where they came second within their group. The following season Troussier would coach CS Alençon in the French fourth division and spent three seasons learning how to manage an amateur football club.

He would return to his former club Red Star 93 in the 1987–88 league season as their manager. In his time with the club he would guide them to second within the group and promotion to the second tier at the end of the 1988–89 league campaign. He would, however leave the club on 30 June 1989 to join second-tier club Créteil on a caretaker basis until 1 October 1989 when Bernard Maligorne took on the management position.

=== Move to Africa ===
Troussier's first move away from France started with Ivory Coast top division football club ASEC Mimosas where in his debut season he won the league championship. This would soon be followed by two further league titles and an endearment towards the country, which saw him gain citizenship with Ivory Coast. With his impressive run at club level the Ivory Coast national football team hired him as their manager in hopes that he could replicate his success with the national team. He was assigned to qualify for the 1994 FIFA World Cup, however he failed to achieve this and soon left his post to move to South African football club Kaizer Chiefs.

After a brief period with Kaizer Chiefs Troussier moved to Moroccan football club Fath Union Sport and led them to the 1995 Coupe du Trône. His time with Fath Union Sport also saw him experience relegation to the second tier with them, however he remained with the club for several seasons until he was offered a chance to return to international management with Nigeria to replace Shaibu Amodu as they attempted to qualify for the 1998 FIFA World Cup. Entering the job halfway through qualifying he led them into four games throughout the campaign as Nigeria qualified, however the Nigeria Football Federation decided to relieve Troussier of his duties and ultimately let highly experienced coach Bora Milutinović lead them into the tournament due to his experience of already managing three different nations in a World Cup at that time.

Troussier quickly found a new job managing another African nation in Burkina Faso where he was assigned to coach them in the 1998 African Cup of Nations, which they were hosting. In a short period of time he made the team genuine title contenders until they were beaten by Egypt 2–0 in the semi-finals. Burkina Faso ultimately finished fourth after losing to DR Congo in the third-place match, nevertheless the result meant it was their highest ever finish at the time. His stint at Burkina Faso would impress the South African Football Association, who offered him the job of leading South Africa to the 1998 World Cup. He would replace Jomo Sono, who, despite leading South Africa to the final of the 1998 African Cup of Nations as a caretaker manager, was not given a permanent position. Troussier, however was not able to galvanize the squad as he had done with Burkina Faso and the team were knocked-out in the group stages. After the tournament he would leave Africa, but before he did he was nicknamed as the "White Witch Doctor" for his overall successful legacy towards African football. However, his role as coach of South Africa remains a highly controversial topic, in which former defender Mark Fish, who played in the 1998 World Cup, later blamed Troussier for the failure.

=== Move to Asia ===
In 1998 Troussier replaced Takeshi Okada to coach Japan and was assigned to improve upon the nation's previous results at the 1998 FIFA World Cup as they prepared to co-host the 2002 FIFA World Cup. Having to use a translator, he struggled to get what he wanted from the players as they were knocked out of the 1999 Copa América within the group stages. The disappointing performance within the tournament gathered a negative reaction from the Japanese media, which saw Troussier go for a more youthful approach and take the reins of the under-20 team as they participated in the 1999 FIFA World Youth Championship. The Japanese team had a successful campaign and were runners-up within the tournament. He continued to take control of Japan's youth teams when he managed the under-23 team in the 2000 Summer Olympics and led them to the quarter-finals. The majority of that team would then go on to be called up to the 2000 AFC Asian Cup and win the tournament. With this success, Troussier went into the 2002 FIFA World Cup with confidence and led Japan to the final 16, making it at the time Japan's best ever finish within the competition.

In July 2003 Troussier was appointed as the new manager of Qatar and was assigned with qualification for the 2004 AFC Asian Cup with the hope of repeating the success he previously had with Japan. Initially his reign went smoothly with a successful qualification campaign and a team selection that once again employed a youthful approach as well as several naturalized players. The tournament itself turned out to be a disappointment that saw Qatar finish bottom of their group. Along with his disappointing start to the 2006 FIFA World Cup qualification campaign, Troussier was ultimately fired from his position.

=== Return to France and Africa ===
On 27 November 2004, Troussier returned to France to manage Ligue 1 team Olympique de Marseille. His time with the club would see him have a tumultuous relationship with the senior players, particularly French international player Bixente Lizarazu. A fifth-place finish at the end of the season saw Troussier replaced by Jean Fernandez. He returned to Africa and became the head coach of the Moroccan national team, having taken over after the country's failure to qualify for the 2006 World Cup. However, he was fired after two months in charge by the Royal Moroccan Football Federation due to a difference in opinion.

=== Return to Asia ===
From 2005, after a stint with Morocco, Troussier would stay away from football and was confirmed to have converted to Islam around 2006. In March 2008, he returned to Japan to manage FC Ryūkyū a Japanese third-division team, before he was replaced by compatriot Jean Paul Rabier. On 22 February 2010, he returned to management with Chinese Super League side Shenzhen Ruby F.C. on a three-year contract. He would once again enforce a youthful team selection; however this would relegate the team, making them the first top-tier champions to be relegated since the foundation of professional football in China. He would remain with the club while they were in the second tier; however after mounting criticism he would alienate himself from the fans after the fourth-round league match versus Chongqing F.C. when in a local TV interview Troussier fired out against criticism and doubt from fans and urged them "not to come to the game or him". Shenzhen Ruby won the match, however former players who were forced to leave by Troussier in his efforts to force youth into the team Li Fei and Chris Killen scored for Chongqing F.C. in their first return to Shenzhen and physical confrontations took place after the match among fans, staffs, players and even Troussier himself. He further alienated his relationships with the squad and staff on 25 August after a defeat to Chengdu Tiancheng F.C. saw the club's hopes of promotion vanish and he provided a statement that he would take leave back to France on a "regular holiday under his contract". The club's supporters would believe the board sent him on leave hoping that the indignity would see him resign rather than compensating him the 1 million euros per year in his contract. He returned from his holiday and managed the club throughout the 2013 Chinese league season, where he was unable to gain promotion.

Troussier is widely believed to be the first-choice replacement as coach of the Malaysia national football team after the Football Association of Malaysia didn't renew former coach K. Rajagopal's contract after it expired in December 2013. He was said to have agreed a MYR5 million annual salary with the FAM. However, the deal fell through when he faced some disagreements with the Football Association of Malaysia.

On 30 June 2014, Troussier became manager of CS Sfaxien of Tunisia. On 28 September 2014, Troussier quit CS Sfaxien.

In April 2018, he was one of 77 applicants for the vacant Cameroon national team job.

==== Vietnam and decline ====
Later in 2018, he became a strategic adviser and then officially a technical director of PVF, a Vietnamese football academy. In 2019, referred by PVF, Troussier became the head coach of Vietnam U19 National Team.

On February 16, 2023, the Vietnam Football Federation (VFF) officially announced it had appointed Troussier head coach of the Vietnam national football team. Troussier officially took office in February 2023, succeeding Park Hang-seo to lead the U22, U23, Olympic and Vietnam national teams. His contract is expected to officially begin in early March 2023 and will run until the end of July 2026, for a total of 3 years and 5 months. At the 32nd Southeast Asian Games, the Vietnam U-22 team lost to Indonesia U-22 in the semifinals, 3-2, and won the bronze medal after beating Myanmar U-22, 3-1.

He then led Vietnam to the biggest failure in its modern history, becoming the first fail to advance past the group stage of the 2023 AFC Asian Cup after two consecutive opening losses against Japan and Indonesia (the latter had not defeated Vietnam since 2016) and for the first time, Vietnam didn't advance past the group stage of an Asian Cup after doing in 2007 and 2019. Vietnam also lost in the last match against Iraq. Following the shock elimination, calls to fire Troussier increased. Despite mounting public pressure, the VFF affirms its support for him and will only reconsider his contract if Vietnam continues to perform poorly in the remaining fixtures of the 2026 World Cup qualification.

Vietnam lost to Indonesia in the first leg of the 2026 FIFA World Cup qualification, with the score 1-0. Following this loss, Troussier continued to face heavy criticism. The loss was blamed on Troussier's lack of focus on professional areas and confrontational attitude with Vietnamese media. On March 26, 2024, Vietnam at home lost 0–3 to Indonesia in their second leg. During the match, Vietnamese fans carried posters urging Troussier's ouster. This loss was the breaking point in his relationship with the Vietnamese supporters, as it was the first time in 20 years that Indonesia had defeated Vietnam on home soil. His contract was eventually terminated by the VFF shortly after the match.

== Personal life ==
Phillipe Troussier and his wife converted to Islam in Morocco, acquiring the name Philippe Omar Troussier.

== Managerial statistics ==
As of match played 26 March 2024

Managerial record by team and tenure
Team	Nat	From	To	Record				
Team	Nat	From	To	G	W	D	L	Win %
Nigeria	(Nigeria)	1 March 1997	1 September 1997	4	3	0	1	75.00
Burkina Faso	(Burkina Faso)	1 September 1997	1 March 1998	6	3	0	3	50.00
South Africa	(South Africa)	1 March 1998	30 June 1998	6	0	4	2	0.00
Japan U20	(Japan)	1 July 1998	30 June 1999	7	5	0	2	71.43
Japan	(Japan)	1 July 1998	1 August 2002	43	17	14	12	39.53
Japan	(Japan)	13 September 2000	30 September 2000	4	2	0	2	50.00
Qatar	(Qatar)	1 January 2004	20 July 2004	4	1	0	3	25.00
Marseille	(France)	28 November 2004	1 June 2005	23	8	6	9	34.78
FAR Rabat	(Morocco)	1 January 2007	31 December 2007	3	1	0	2	33.33
Shenzhen Ruby	(China)	23 February 2011	6 November 2013	49	11	11	27	22.45
Sfaxien	(Tunisia)	1 July 2014	28 September 2014	10	4	3	3	40.00
HZ Greentown	(China)	2 December 2014	2 July 2015	17	5	5	7	29.41
Vietnam U23	(Vietnam)	1 March 2023	26 March 2024	12	6	3	3	50.00
Vietnam	(Vietnam)	1 March 2023	26 March 2024	14	4	0	10	28.57
Career Total				202	70	46	86	34.65

== Honors ==
ASEC Mimosas

- Côte d'Ivoire Premier Division: 1990, 1991, 1992

FUS Rabat

- Coupe du Trône: 1995

Japan U20

- FIFA U-20 World Cup: runner-up 1999

Japan

- FIFA Confederations Cup: runner-up 2001
- AFC Asian Cup: 2000

Vietnam U23

- SEA Games: bronze medal 2023

Individual

- AFC Coach of the Year: 2000
- Japan Football Hall of Fame: Inducted in 2020

Orders

- Knight of the National Order of Merit: 2009
