= Football at the 2023 SEA Games – Men's tournament =

2023 SEA Games Men's Football Tournament
Tournament details
- Host country: Cambodia
- Dates: 29 April – 16 May
- Teams: 10 (from 10 associations)
- Venue: 3 (in 1 host city)

Final positions
- Champions: Indonesia (3rd title)
- Runners-up: Thailand
- Third place: Vietnam
- Fourth place: Myanmar

Tournament statistics
- Matches played: 24
- Goals scored: 81 (3.38 per match)
- Attendance: 230,407 (9,600 per match)
- Top scorer(s): (Indonesia) Fajar Fathur Rahman (Indonesia) Ramadhan Sananta (Vietnam) Nguyễn Văn Tùng (5 goals each)

The men's football tournament at the 2023 SEA Games was held in Cambodia. Ten Southeast Asian nations entered the men's tournament. The tournament was limited to players exclusively under-22 years of age (born on or after 1 January 2001).

Vietnam were the two-time defending champions, but were eliminated in the semi-finals by Indonesia. The Indonesians went on to win their first title in 32 years, and their third title in history by defeating Thailand 5–2 in the final.

== Competition schedule ==
The following is the competition schedule for the football competitions:

G	Group stage	½	Semifinals	B	3rd place play-off	F	Final

Event	Sat 29	Sun 30	Mon 1	Tue 2	Wed 3	Thu 4	Fri 5	Sat 6	Sun 7	Mon 8	Tue 9	Wed 10	Thu 11	Fri 12	Sat 13	Sun 14	Mon 15	Tue 16	
Men	G	G		G	G	G		G	G	G		G	G		½			B	F

== Venues ==
Three venues were used during the tournament. Olympic Stadium hosted Group A, the Semi-finals, Bronze medal match and the Gold medal Match.

Football at the 2023 SEA Games – Men's tournament (Cambodia)
Football at the 2023 SEA Games – Men's tournament (Cambodia)	Olympic Stadium	RSN Stadium	Visakha Stadium
Football at the 2023 SEA Games – Men's tournament (Cambodia)	Capacity: 50,000	Capacity: 5,000	Capacity: 15,000

== Participating nations ==
- Cambodia (hosts)
- Indonesia
- Laos
- Malaysia
- Myanmar
- Philippines
- Singapore
- Thailand
- Timor-Leste
- Vietnam

== Draw ==
The draw for the tournament was held on 5 April 2023 at the Morodok Techo National Stadium. 10 teams were seeded into five pots based on their performance in the 2021 edition. The hosts were allocated in Pot 1.

Pot 1	Pot 2	Pot 3	Pot 4	Pot 5
Cambodia (H); Vietnam (C)	Thailand; Indonesia	Malaysia; Myanmar	Singapore; Philippines	Laos; Timor-Leste

== Squads ==
The men's tournament was an under-22 international tournament, with no overage players allowed.

== Group stage ==
- All times are Cambodia Standard Time (UTC+7).

=== Group A ===
Pos	Team	Pld	W	D	L	GF	GA	GD	Pts	Qualification
1	Indonesia	4	4	0	0	13	1	+12	12	Advance to Semi-finals
2	Myanmar	4	3	0	1	4	5	−1	9	Advance to Semi-finals
3	Cambodia (H)	4	1	1	2	6	5	+1	4	
4	Timor-Leste	4	1	0	3	3	8	−5	3	
5	Philippines	4	0	1	3	1	8	−7	1	

Source: FIFA
(H) Hosts
29 April 2023
16:00

Indonesia	3–0	Philippines
Marselino 45'; Irfan 89'; Fajar 90+1'	Report

Olympic Stadium, Phnom Penh
Attendance: 14,500
Referee: Rowan Arumughan (India)
29 April 2023
19:00

Cambodia	4–0	Timor-Leste
Sinti 38', 45+2'; Rotana 73'; Pisoth 82'	Report

Olympic Stadium, Phnom Penh
Attendance: 29,985
Referee: Abdullah Jamali (Kuwait)

2 May 2023
16:00

Myanmar	1–0	Timor-Leste
Thet Hein Soe 72'	Report

Olympic Stadium, Phnom Penh
Attendance: 3,589
Referee: Hassan Akrami (Iran)
2 May 2023
19:00

Philippines	1–1	Cambodia
Cariño 90+3'	Report	Rina 26'

Olympic Stadium, Phnom Penh
Attendance: 30,118
Referee: Nazmi Nasaruddin (Malaysia)

4 May 2023
16:00

Indonesia	5–0	Myanmar
Marselino 19'; Sananta 31' (pen.), 59'; Fajar 73'; Titan 87'	Report

Olympic Stadium, Phnom Penh
Attendance: 1,652
Referee: Jumpei Iida (Japan)
4 May 2023
19:00

Timor-Leste	3–0	Philippines
Mouzinho 14'; Figo 55'; Mesquita 90'	Report

Olympic Stadium, Phnom Penh
Attendance: 3,182
Referee: Qasim Al-Hatmi (Oman)

7 May 2023
16:00

Timor-Leste	0–3	Indonesia
	Report	Sananta 44'; Fajar 62', 74'

Olympic Stadium, Phnom Penh
Attendance: 2,765
Referee: Nazmi Nasaruddin (Malaysia)
7 May 2023
19:00

Myanmar	2–0	Cambodia
Hein Htet Aung 12'; Thet Hein Soe 38'	Report

Olympic Stadium, Phnom Penh
Attendance: 32,804
Referee: Qasim Al-Hatmi (Oman)

10 May 2023
19:00

Philippines	0–1	Myanmar
	Report	Thet Hein Soe 55'

RSN Stadium, Phnom Penh
Attendance: 432
Referee: Rowan Arumughan (India)
10 May 2023
19:00

Cambodia	1–2	Indonesia
Sovannmakara 45+1'	Report	Titan 9'; Beckham 52'

Olympic Stadium, Phnom Penh
Attendance: 29,168
Referee: Shen Yinhao (China)

=== Group B ===
Pos	Team	Pld	W	D	L	GF	GA	GD	Pts	Qualification
1	Thailand	4	3	1	0	10	3	+7	10	Advance to Semi-finals
2	Vietnam	4	3	1	0	8	3	+5	10	Advance to Semi-finals
3	Malaysia	4	2	0	2	13	5	+8	6	
4	Laos	4	0	1	3	2	11	−9	1	
5	Singapore	4	0	1	3	2	13	−11	1	

Source: FIFA
30 April 2023
16:00

Thailand	3–1	Singapore
Teerasak 7'; Achitpol 38'; Purachet 49'	Report	Singh 41'

Visakha Stadium, Phnom Penh
Attendance: 2,573
Referee: Kim Hee-gon (South Korea)
30 April 2023
19:00

Vietnam	2–0	Laos
Nguyễn Văn Tùng 2'; Nguyễn Quốc Việt 90+2'	Report

Visakha Stadium, Phnom Penh
Attendance: 3,925
Referee: Khin Ouseyha (Cambodia)

3 May 2023
16:00

Singapore	1–3	Vietnam
Vũ Tiến Long 90+4' (o.g.)	Report	Nguyễn Văn Tùng 35'; Nguyễn Thái Sơn 43'; Ilhan 79' (o.g.)

Visakha Stadium, Phnom Penh
Attendance: 4,062
Referee: Shen Yinhao (China)
3 May 2023
19:00

Malaysia	5–1	Laos
Ubaidullah 4'; Anantaza 28' (o.g.); Syahir 75'; Najmudin 90+2'; Sonexay 90+4' (o.g.)	Report	Ubaidullah 21' (o.g.)

Visakha Stadium, Phnom Penh
Attendance: 4,850
Referee: Clifford Daypuyat (Philippines)

6 May 2023
16:00

Thailand	2–0	Malaysia
Anan 73'; Yotsakorn 84'	Report

Visakha Stadium, Phnom Penh
Attendance: 2,423
Referee: Kim Hee-gon (South Korea)
6 May 2023
19:00

Laos	0–0	Singapore
	Report

Visakha Stadium, Phnom Penh
Attendance: 647
Referee: Khin Ouseyha (Cambodia)

8 May 2023
16:00

Laos	1–4	Thailand
Angot 90+2' (pen.)	Report	Yotsakorn 2', 40'; Teerasak 5', 52'

Visakha Stadium, Phnom Penh
Attendance: 2,106
Referee: Clifford Daypuyat (Philippines)
8 May 2023
19:00

Malaysia	1–2	Vietnam
Aliff 43'	Report	Nguyễn Văn Tùng 6', 33'

Visakha Stadium, Phnom Penh
Attendance: 3,558
Referee: Jumpei Iida (Japan)

11 May 2023
16:00

Singapore	0–7	Malaysia
	Report	Saravanan 14', 47', 53', 62'; Haqimi 45+2'; Mukhairi 87'; Aiman 90+3'

Visakha Stadium, Phnom Penh
Attendance: 1,320
Referee: Hassan Akrami (Iran)
11 May 2023
19:00

Vietnam	1–1	Thailand
Lê Quốc Nhật Nam 53'	Report	Achitpol 2'

Visakha Stadium, Phnom Penh
Attendance: 5,402
Referee: Ammar Ashkanani (Kuwait)

== Knockout stage ==
Semi-finals
13 May – Phnom Penh
Indonesia	3
Vietnam	2
13 May – Phnom Penh
Thailand	3
Myanmar	0

Gold medal match
16 May – Phnom Penh
Indonesia (a.e.t.)	5
Thailand	2
Bronze medal match
16 May – Phnom Penh
Vietnam	3
Myanmar	1

=== Semi-finals ===
13 May 2023
16:00

Indonesia	3–2	Vietnam
Komang 9'; Ferarri 53'; Taufany 90+6'	Report	Nguyễn Văn Tùng 36'; Bagas 79' (o.g.)

Olympic Stadium, Phnom Penh
Attendance: 7,864
Referee: Kim Hee-gon (South Korea)
13 May 2023
20:00

Thailand	3–0	Myanmar
Teerasak 37'; James 85'; Anan 90+7'	Report

Olympic Stadium, Phnom Penh
Attendance: 4,520
Referee: Shen Yinhao (China)

=== Bronze medal match ===
16 May 2023
16:00

Vietnam	3–1	Myanmar
Hồ Văn Cường 8', 34'; Khuất Văn Khang 56'	Report	Aung Myo Khant 88'

Olympic Stadium, Phnom Penh
Attendance: 10,829
Referee: Hassan Akrami (Iran)

=== Gold medal match ===
16 May 2023
19:30

Indonesia	5–2 (a.e.t.)	Thailand
Sananta 20', 45+5'; Irfan 91'; Fajar 107'; Beckham 120'	Report	Anan 65'; Yotsakorn 90+7'

Olympic Stadium, Phnom Penh
Attendance: 28,133
Referee: Qasim Al-Hatmi (Oman)

== Goalscorers ==
There were 81 goals scored in 24 matches, for an average of 3.38 goals per match.

5 goals

- (Indonesia) Fajar Fathur Rahman
- (Indonesia) Ramadhan Sananta
- (Vietnam) Nguyễn Văn Tùng

4 goals

- (Malaysia) T. Saravanan
- (Thailand) Teerasak Poeiphimai
- (Thailand) Yotsakorn Burapha

3 goals

- (Myanmar) Thet Hein Soe
- (Thailand) Anan Yodsangwal

2 goals

- (Cambodia) Chou Sinti
- (Indonesia) Beckham Putra
- (Indonesia) Irfan Jauhari
- (Indonesia) Marselino Ferdinan
- (Indonesia) Titan Agung
- (Thailand) Achitpol Keereerom
- (Vietnam) Hồ Văn Cường

1 goal

- (Cambodia) Ky Rina
- (Cambodia) Lim Pisoth
- (Cambodia) Sin Sovannmakara
- (Cambodia) Sor Rotana
- (Indonesia) Komang Teguh Trisnanda
- (Indonesia) Muhammad Ferarri
- (Indonesia) Taufany Muslihuddin
- (Laos) Roman Angot
- (Malaysia) Aiman Afif
- (Malaysia) Aliff Izwan
- (Malaysia) Haqimi Azim
- (Malaysia) Mukhairi Ajmal
- (Malaysia) Najmudin Akmal
- (Malaysia) Syahir Bashah
- (Malaysia) Ubaidullah Shamsul
- (Myanmar) Aung Myo Khant
- (Myanmar) Hein Htet Aung
- (Philippines) Dov Cariño
- (Singapore) Nicky Melvin Singh
- (Thailand) Leon James
- (Thailand) Purachet Thodsanit
- (Timor-Leste) Elias Mesquita
- (Timor-Leste) Mouzinho
- (Timor-Leste) Luís Figo
- (Vietnam) Khuất Văn Khang
- (Vietnam) Lê Quốc Nhật Nam
- (Vietnam) Nguyễn Quốc Việt
- (Vietnam) Nguyễn Thái Sơn

1 own goal

- (Indonesia) Bagas Kaffa (against Vietnam)
- (Laos) Anantaza Siphongphan (against Malaysia)
- (Laos) Sonexay Phanhthaxay (against Malaysia)
- (Malaysia) Ubaidullah Shamsul (against Laos)
- (Singapore) Ilhan Noor (against Vietnam)
- (Vietnam) Vũ Tiến Long (against Singapore)

== Final ranking ==
Pos	Team	Pld	W	D	L	GF	GA	GD	Pts	Final result
1	Indonesia	6	6	0	0	21	5	+16	18	Gold Medal
2	Thailand	6	4	1	1	15	8	+7	13	Silver Medal
3	Vietnam	6	4	1	1	13	7	+6	13	Bronze Medal
4	Myanmar	6	3	0	3	5	11	−6	9	Fourth place
5	Malaysia	4	2	0	2	13	5	+8	6	Eliminated in group stage
6	Cambodia (H)	4	1	1	2	6	5	+1	4	Eliminated in group stage
7	Timor-Leste	4	1	0	3	3	8	−5	3	Eliminated in group stage
8	Philippines	4	0	1	3	1	8	−7	1	Eliminated in group stage
9	Laos	4	0	1	3	2	11	−9	1	Eliminated in group stage
10	Singapore	4	0	1	3	2	13	−11	1	Eliminated in group stage

(H) Hosts

== Controversy ==
Chaos ensued in the match between the Indonesia and Thailand in the final match.

The first incident occurred when referee Qasim Al Hatmi blew the whistle during the injury time of the second half. At that time, Indonesia had a 2–1 lead and were ready to celebrate their victory and championship title. When the whistle sounded, Indonesian head coach Indra Sjafri, started celebrating with the staff because they mistook the long blow for a full-time signal. However, Al Hatmi had actually intended to signal a free kick for Thailand. After the premature celebrations settled down, the free kick that followed led to Thailand striker Yotsakorn Burapha scoring an equalizer goal, thereby making the score 2–2. Indonesian coaches and players began criticizing the referee's decision, and Indonesian media claims that Al Hatmi gave an unfair advantage to the opponent with the seven-minute additional time.

After the extra time match started, Indonesian player Irfan Jauhari scored a goal in the 91st minute, making the score 3–2 and giving back Indonesia the lead. The goal was again followed by unrest in the benches. In the videos that were shown, Indonesia's team manager Sumardji was beaten and punched by several Thai coaching staff and players which resulted in Sumardji's face bleeding from the nose and mouth. As a result of the incident, the referee issued several red cards to the Thailand players and coaching staff. Indonesia went on to score two more goals and lose none during the remaining duration of extra time, and conquer the championship title after 32 years of drought.

== See also ==
- Football at the 2023 SEA Games – Women's tournament
