= 2020 AFF Championship Group A =

Association football group

Group A was one of the two groups of competing nations at the 2020 AFF Championship. It consisted of Thailand, Myanmar, the Philippines, hosts Singapore and Timor-Leste. The matches took place from 5 to 18 December 2021. Thailand and hosts Singapore, as the top two teams, advanced to the semi-finals. Thailand topped the group with four group game victories. Singapore would advance as runners-up, with three wins and a loss. The Philippines finished third, Myanmar finished fourth, having won one game, while Timor-Leste finished fifth without registering a single point.

== Teams ==
Draw position	Team	Appearance	Previous best performance	FIFA World Rankings (November 2021)
A1	Thailand (Note: Due to non-compliance with conditions set by the World Anti-Doping Agency (WADA), Thailand was not allowed to be represented by its national flag. The sanctions took effect in October 2021.)	13th	Winners (1996, 2000, 2002, 2014, 2016)	118
A2	Myanmar	13th	Fourth place / Semi-finalists (2004, 2016)	148
A3	Philippines	12th	Semi-finalists (2010, 2012, 2014, 2018)	126
A4	Singapore	13th	Winners (1998, 2004, 2007, 2012)	160
A5	Timor-Leste	3rd	Group stage (2004, 2018)	194

== Standings ==
Pos	Team	Pld	W	D	L	GF	GA	GD	Pts	Qualification
1	Thailand	4	4	0	0	10	1	+9	12	Advance to semi-finals
2	Singapore (H)	4	3	0	1	7	3	+4	9	Advance to semi-finals
3	Philippines	4	2	0	2	12	6	+6	6	
4	Myanmar	4	1	0	3	4	10	−6	3	
5	Timor-Leste	4	0	0	4	0	13	−13	0	

Source: AFF
(H) Hosts

== Matches ==
=== Timor-Leste vs Thailand ===
5 December 2021
17:30

Timor-Leste	0–2	Thailand
	Report (AFFSZ); Report (AFF)	Pathompol 51'; Supachok 81'

National Stadium, Kallang
Attendance: 2,432
Referee: Qasim Al-Hatmi (Oman)

Timor-Leste	Thailand

GK	12	Junildo Pereira	(yellow card) 28'
RB	22	Nelson Viegas	(yellow card) 37'
CB	29	João Panji
CB	18	Filomeno
LB	24	Yohanes Gusmão		(substituted off) 46'
DM	15	Armindo (c)
CM	6	Jhon Firth		(substituted off) 90'
CM	14	Cristevão
RF	7	Rufino Gama		(substituted off) 46'
CF	21	Paulo Gali		(substituted off) 90'
LF	11	Mouzinho		(substituted off) 65'
Substitutions:
FW	17	Elias Mesquita		(substituted on) 46'
FW	10	João Pedro		(substituted on) 46'
MF	27	Dom Lucas Braz	(yellow card) 78'	(substituted on) 65'
FW	16	Zenivio		(substituted on) 90'
DF	4	Jaimito Soares		(substituted on) 90'
Manager:
(Brazil) Fábio Magrão

GK	20	Chatchai Budprom
RB	15	Narubadin Weerawatnodom
CB	4	Manuel Bihr
CB	16	Phitiwat Sukjitthammakul	(substituted off) 46'
LB	19	Tristan Do
DM	26	Kritsada Kaman
DM	6	Sarach Yooyen
CM	8	Thitiphan Puangchan	(substituted off) 68'
RF	7	Supachok Sarachat	(substituted off) 85'
CF	10	Teerasil Dangda (c)	(substituted off) 68'
LF	11	Bordin Phala	(substituted off) 46'
Substitutions:
MF	12	Thanawat Suengchitthawon	(substituted on) 46'
FW	14	Pathompol Charoenrattanapirom	(substituted on) 46'
FW	22	Supachai Chaided	(substituted on) 68'
MF	24	Worachit Kanitsribampen	(substituted on) 68'
FW	9	Adisak Kraisorn	(substituted on) 85'
Manager:
(Brazil) Alexandré Pölking

=== Singapore vs Myanmar ===
5 December 2021
20:45

Singapore	3–0	Myanmar
Safuwan 34'; Ikhsan 39', 45+1'	Report (AFFSZ); Report (AFF)

National Stadium, Kallang
Attendance: 7,588
Referee: Ahmed Faisal Al-Ali (Jordan)

Singapore	Myanmar

GK	18	Hassan Sunny
RB	4	Nazrul Nazari		(substituted off) 89'
CB	17	Irfan Fandi	(yellow card) 20'
CB	21	Safuwan Baharudin
LB	2	Shakir Hamzah
CM	14	Hariss Harun (c)	(yellow card) 67'
CM	8	Shahdan Sulaiman
RW	20	Shawal Anuar		(substituted off) 66'
AM	15	Song Ui-young		(substituted off) 81'
LW	10	Faris Ramli		(substituted off) 66'
CF	9	Ikhsan Fandi		(substituted off) 89'
Substitutions:
DF	13	Zulqarnaen Suzliman		(substituted on) 66'
MF	16	Hami Syahin		(substituted on) 66'
FW	27	Adam Swandi		(substituted on) 81'
DF	24	Iqram Rifqi		(substituted on) 89'
FW	7	Amy Recha		(substituted on) 89'
Manager:
(Japan) Tatsuma Yoshida

GK	18	Myo Min Latt
CB	2	Nyein Chan	(yellow card) 85'
CB	5	Win Moe Kyaw
CB	3	Zaw Ye Tun		(substituted off) 46'
RWB	4	David Htan
LWB	30	Hein Htet Aung		(substituted off) 64'
CM	11	Maung Maung Lwin (c)
CM	6	Hlaing Bo Bo
CM	10	Yan Naing Oo		(substituted off) 90+1'
CF	13	Aung Kaung Mann		(substituted off) 46'
CF	20	Suan Lam Mang		(substituted off) 46'
Substitutions:
MF	7	Lwin Moe Aung		(substituted on) 46'
DF	17	Hein Phyo Win		(substituted on) 46'
FW	12	Win Naing Tun		(substituted on) 46'
FW	14	Htet Phyo Wai		(substituted on) 64'
MF	16	Myat Kaung Khant		(substituted on) 90+1'
Manager:
(Germany) Antoine Hey

=== Myanmar vs Timor-Leste ===
8 December 2021
17:30

Myanmar	2–0	Timor-Leste
Than Paing 16'; Maung Maung Lwin 50'	Report (AFFSZ); Report (AFF)

National Stadium, Kallang
Attendance: 970
Referee: Saoud Ali Al-Adba (Qatar)

Myanmar	Timor-Leste

GK	18	Myo Min Latt
CB	4	David Htan
CB	5	Win Moe Kyaw	(substituted off) 88'
CB	17	Hein Phyo Win
RM	11	Maung Maung Lwin (c)
CM	6	Hlaing Bo Bo	(substituted off) 75'
CM	7	Lwin Moe Aung
LM	30	Hein Htet Aung
AM	16	Myat Kaung Khant	(substituted off) 75'
CF	9	Than Paing	(substituted off) 65'
CF	20	Suan Lam Mang
Substitutions:
FW	12	Win Naing Tun	(substituted on) 65'
FW	14	Htet Phyo Wai	(substituted on) 75'
MF	8	Maung Maung Win	(substituted on) 75'
MF	10	Yan Naing Oo	(substituted on) 88'
Manager:
(Germany) Antoine Hey

GK	12	Junildo Pereira
RB	22	Nelson Viegas		(substituted off) 78'
CB	29	João Panji		(substituted off) 83'
CB	18	Filomeno
LB	24	Yohanes Gusmão
DM	15	Armindo (c)
CM	6	Jhon Firth
CM	14	Cristevão		(substituted off) 78'
RF	21	Paulo Gali	(yellow card) 11'
CF	11	Mouzinho		(substituted off) 83'
LF	10	João Pedro		(substituted off) 39'
Substitutions:
FW	17	Elias Mesquita		(substituted on) 39'
DF	4	Jaimito Soares		(substituted on) 78'
MF	8	Olegario		(substituted on) 78'
FW	7	Rufino Gama		(substituted on) 83'
DF	13	Gumario		(substituted on) 83'
Manager:
(Brazil) Fábio Magrão

=== Philippines vs Singapore ===
8 December 2021
20:30

Philippines	1–2	Singapore
Nazari 69'	Report (AFFSZ); Report (AFF)	Hariss 61'; Faris 63'

National Stadium, Kallang
Attendance: 8,922
Referee: Kim Dae-yong (South Korea)

Philippines	Singapore

GK	16	Kevin Ray Mendoza
RB	29	Patrick Reichelt
CB	12	Amani Aguinaldo	(yellow card) 20'
CB	13	Justin Baas
LB	23	Martin Steuble
CM	6	Kevin Ingreso		(substituted off) 76'
CM	22	Amin Nazari
RW	21	Oliver Bias		(substituted off) 69'
AM	17	Stephan Schröck (c)	(yellow card) 22'
LW	11	Daisuke Sato
CF	9	Bienvenido Marañón		(substituted off) 76'
Substitutions:
FW	8	Ángel Guirado		(substituted on) 69'
MF	14	Oskari Kekkonen		(substituted on) 76'
MF	10	Mike Ott		(substituted on) 76'
Manager:
(England) Stewart Hall

GK	18	Hassan Sunny
RB	13	Zulqarnaen Suzliman		(substituted off) 72'
CB	17	Irfan Fandi
CB	21	Safuwan Baharudin
LB	2	Shakir Hamzah	(yellow card) 66'
DM	14	Hariss Harun (c)
DM	23	Zulfahmi Arifin
CM	6	Anumanthan Kumar		(substituted off) 79'
RF	22	Gabriel Quak		(substituted off) 60'
CF	9	Ikhsan Fandi
LF	10	Faris Ramli
Substitutions:
MF	15	Song Ui-young		(substituted on) 60'
DF	4	Nazrul Nazari		(substituted on) 72'
DF	24	Iqram Rifqi		(substituted on) 79'
MF	8	Shahdan Sulaiman		(substituted on) 79'
Manager:
(Japan) Tatsuma Yoshida

=== Timor-Leste vs Philippines ===
11 December 2021
17:30

Timor-Leste	0–7	Philippines
	Report (AFFSZ); Report (AFF)	Steuble 21'; Nazari 31'; Guirado 35'; Reichelt 40'; Nyholm 45'; Marañón 45+1'; Ingreso 78'

National Stadium, Kallang
Attendance: 420
Referee: Nazmi Nasaruddin (Malaysia)

Timor-Leste	Philippines

GK	1	Aderito		(substituted off) 46'
CB	29	João Panji
CB	13	Gumario
CB	18	Filomeno
DM	15	Armindo (c)
RM	4	Jaimito Soares
CM	27	Dom Lucas Braz		(substituted off) 46'
CM	8	Olegario		(substituted off) 46'
LM	3	Orcelio	(yellow card) 73'
SS	17	Elias Mesquita		(substituted off) 87'
CF	7	Rufino Gama		(substituted off) 46'
Substitutions:
FW	21	Paulo Gali		(substituted on) 46'
FW	11	Mouzinho		(substituted on) 46'
MF	6	Jhon Firth		(substituted on) 46'
GK	12	Junildo Pereira		(substituted on) 46'
FW	16	Zenivio		(substituted on) 87'
Manager:
(Brazil) Fábio Magrão

GK	16	Kevin Ray Mendoza
RB	29	Patrick Reichelt
CB	12	Amani Aguinaldo		(substituted off) 46'
CB	2	Jesper Nyholm
LB	11	Daisuke Sato
DM	6	Kevin Ingreso	(yellow card) 37'
DM	23	Martin Steuble
CM	22	Amin Nazari		(substituted off) 46'
RF	8	Ángel Guirado		(substituted off) 71'
CF	17	Stephan Schröck (c)		(substituted off) 46'
LF	9	Bienvenido Marañón		(substituted off) 46'
Substitutions:
MF	19	Yrick Gallantes		(substituted on) 46'
MF	14	Oskari Kekkonen		(substituted on) 46'
FW	18	Kenshiro Daniels	(yellow card) 84'	(substituted on) 46'
DF	13	Justin Baas		(substituted on) 46'
MF	10	Mike Ott		(substituted on) 71'
Manager:
(England) Stewart Hall

=== Thailand vs Myanmar ===
11 December 2021
20:30

Thailand	4–0	Myanmar
Teerasil 23', 53' (pen.); Worachit 78'; Supachok 90+2'	Report (AFFSZ); Report (AFF)

National Stadium, Kallang
Attendance: 1,142
Referee: Shukri Al-Hunfush (Saudi Arabia)

Thailand	Myanmar

GK	20	Chatchai Budprom
RB	15	Narubadin Weerawatnodom	(substituted off) 83'
CB	4	Manuel Bihr
CB	16	Phitiwat Sukjitthammakul
LB	3	Theerathon Bunmathan
CM	26	Kritsada Kaman
CM	6	Sarach Yooyen	(substituted off) 67'
RW	12	Thanawat Suengchitthawon	(substituted off) 76'
LW	18	Chanathip Songkrasin (c)	(substituted off) 66'
CF	22	Supachai Chaided	(substituted off) 66'
CF	10	Teerasil Dangda
Substitutions:
MF	8	Thitiphan Puangchan	(substituted on) 66'
MF	7	Supachok Sarachat	(substituted on) 66'
FW	14	Pathompol Charoenrattanapirom	(substituted on) 67'
MF	24	Worachit Kanitsribampen	(substituted on) 76'
DF	19	Tristan Do	(substituted on) 83'
Manager:
(Brazil) Alexandré Pölking

GK	18	Myo Min Latt
CB	4	David Htan
CB	5	Win Moe Kyaw
CB	17	Hein Phyo Win	(yellow card) 29'
DM	8	Maung Maung Win		(substituted off) 70'
CM	6	Hlaing Bo Bo		(substituted off) 54'
CM	7	Lwin Moe Aung
RW	11	Maung Maung Lwin (c)
LW	30	Hein Htet Aung
CF	9	Than Paing		(substituted off) 83'
CF	20	Suan Lam Mang	(yellow card) 14'
Substitutions:
MF	10	Yan Naing Oo		(substituted on) 54'
FW	12	Win Naing Tun		(substituted on) 70'
FW	13	Aung Kaung Mann		(substituted on) 83'
Manager:
(Germany) Antoine Hey

=== Philippines vs Thailand ===
14 December 2021
17:30

Philippines	1–2	Thailand
Reichelt 57'	Report (AFFSZ); Report (AFF)	Teerasil 26', 78' (pen.)

National Stadium, Kallang
Attendance: 2,559
Referee: Qasim Al-Hatmi (Oman)

Philippines	Thailand

GK	16	Kevin Ray Mendoza
CB	12	Amani Aguinaldo
CB	2	Jesper Nyholm
CB	13	Justin Baas
RWB	23	Martin Steuble	(yellow card) 13'
LWB	11	Daisuke Sato
DM	6	Kevin Ingreso		(substituted off) 90'
RM	29	Patrick Reichelt		(substituted off) 90'
LM	7	Iain Ramsay		(substituted off) 82'
AM	17	Stephan Schröck (c)	(yellow card) 43'
CF	8	Ángel Guirado		(substituted off) 66'
Substitutions:
MF	10	Mike Ott		(substituted on) 66'
MF	19	Yrick Gallantes		(substituted on) 82'
FW	9	Bienvenido Marañón		(substituted on) 90'
MF	22	Amin Nazari		(substituted on) 90'
Manager:
(England) Stewart Hall

GK	20	Chatchai Budprom
CB	15	Narubadin Weerawatnodom
CB	4	Manuel Bihr
CB	3	Theerathon Bunmathan
CM	26	Kritsada Kaman
CM	16	Phitiwat Sukjitthammakul
CM	6	Sarach Yooyen	(yellow card) 56'	(substituted off) 75'
RW	7	Supachok Sarachat		(substituted off) 90+1'
AM	12	Thanawat Suengchitthawon		(substituted off) 76'
LW	18	Chanathip Songkrasin (c)	(yellow card) 65'	(substituted off) 76'
CF	10	Teerasil Dangda		(substituted off) 87'
Substitutions:
FW	11	Bordin Phala		(substituted on) 75'
MF	8	Thitiphan Puangchan		(substituted on) 76'
MF	24	Worachit Kanitsribampen	(yellow card) 90'	(substituted on) 76'
DF	5	Elias Dolah		(substituted on) 87'
FW	22	Supachai Chaided		(substituted on) 90+1'
Manager:
(Brazil) Alexandré Pölking

=== Singapore vs Timor-Leste ===
14 December 2021
20:30

Singapore	2–0	Timor-Leste
Adam S. 4'; Shakir 70'	Report (AFFSZ); Report (AFF)

National Stadium, Kallang
Attendance: 8,518
Referee: Mohammed Al-Hoaish (Saudi Arabia)

Singapore	Timor-Leste

GK	18	Hassan Sunny
RB	13	Zulqarnaen Suzliman	(substituted off) 88'
CB	17	Irfan Fandi
CB	21	Safuwan Baharudin
LB	2	Shakir Hamzah
CM	14	Hariss Harun (c)
CM	16	Hami Syahin	(substituted off) 67'
RW	20	Shawal Anuar
AM	15	Song Ui-young	(substituted off) 46'
LW	27	Adam Swandi	(substituted off) 67'
CF	9	Ikhsan Fandi	(substituted off) 83'
Substitutions:
MF	8	Shahdan Sulaiman	(substituted on) 46'
FW	10	Faris Ramli	(substituted on) 67'
MF	6	Anumanthan Kumar	(substituted on) 67'
FW	7	Amy Recha	(substituted on) 83'
DF	4	Nazrul Nazari	(substituted on) 88'
Manager:
(Japan) Tatsuma Yoshida

GK	12	Junildo Pereira
RB	22	Nelson Viegas
CB	29	João Panji
CB	18	Filomeno	(substituted off) 78'
LB	24	Yohanes Gusmão	(substituted off) 72'
DM	15	Armindo (c)
CM	6	Jhon Firth	(substituted off) 90'
CM	14	Cristevão
RF	21	Paulo Gali
CF	11	Mouzinho	(substituted off) 90'
LF	17	Elias Mesquita	(substituted off) 72'
Substitutions:
DF	3	Orcelio	(substituted on) 72'
FW	16	Zenivio	(substituted on) 72'
DF	4	Jaimito Soares	(substituted on) 78'
FW	9	Anizo Correia	(substituted on) 90'
MF	27	Dom Lucas Braz	(substituted on) 90'
Manager:
(Brazil) Fábio Magrão

=== Thailand vs Singapore ===
18 December 2021
20:30

Thailand	2–0	Singapore
Dolah 31'; Supachai 45+2'	Report (AFFSZ); Report (AFF)

National Stadium, Kallang
Attendance: 9,540
Referee: Ahmad Yaqoub Ibrahim (Jordan)

Thailand	Singapore

GK	23	Siwarak Tedsungnoen (c)	(yellow card) 69'
RB	19	Tristan Do
CB	5	Elias Dolah
CB	25	Pawee Tanthatemee
LB	2	Suriya Singmui		(substituted off) 46'
CM	27	Weerathep Pomphan
CM	8	Thitiphan Puangchan		(substituted off) 65'
RW	14	Pathompol Charoenrattanapirom		(substituted off) 46'
AM	24	Worachit Kanitsribampen
LW	11	Bordin Phala		(substituted off) 46'
CF	22	Supachai Chaided		(substituted off) 66'
Substitutions:
FW	9	Adisak Kraisorn		(substituted on) 46'
DF	13	Philip Roller		(substituted on) 46'
MF	28	Pokklaw Anan		(substituted on) 46'
MF	29	Picha Autra		(substituted on) 65'
MF	21	Sivakorn Tiatrakul	(yellow card) 73'	(substituted on) 66'
Manager:
(Brazil) Alexandré Pölking

GK	18	Hassan Sunny
RB	13	Zulqarnaen Suzliman
CB	17	Irfan Fandi
CB	21	Safuwan Baharudin
LB	2	Shakir Hamzah		(substituted off) 12'
DM	14	Hariss Harun (c)
DM	8	Shahdan Sulaiman
CM	16	Hami Syahin	(yellow card) 18'	(substituted off) 65'
RF	20	Shawal Anuar		(substituted off) 65'
CF	9	Ikhsan Fandi		(substituted off) 90'
LF	10	Faris Ramli
Substitutions:
MF	23	Zulfahmi Arifin	(yellow card) 46'	(substituted on) 12'	(substituted off) 89'
FW	28	Saifullah Akbar		(substituted on) 65'
DF	25	Nur Adam Abdullah		(substituted on) 65'
DF	5	Amirul Adli		(substituted on) 89'
FW	7	Amy Recha		(substituted on) 90'
Manager:
(Japan) Tatsuma Yoshida

=== Myanmar vs Philippines ===
18 December 2021
20:30

Myanmar	2–3	Philippines
Htet Phyo Wai 74', 86'	Report (AFFSZ); Report (AFF)	Marañón 16', 19', 45'

Bishan Stadium, Bishan
Attendance: 215
Referee: Mohammed Al-Hoaish (Saudi Arabia)

Myanmar	Philippines

GK	18	Myo Min Latt
CB	4	David Htan
CB	5	Win Moe Kyaw		(substituted off) 81'
CB	17	Hein Phyo Win
DM	22	Aung Naing Win		(substituted off) 25'
CM	6	Hlaing Bo Bo		(substituted off) 81'
CM	7	Lwin Moe Aung
RW	11	Maung Maung Lwin (c)	(yellow card) 60'
LW	30	Hein Htet Aung		(substituted off) 59'
CF	9	Than Paing		(substituted off) 59'
CF	20	Suan Lam Mang
Substitutions:
DF	2	Nyein Chan	(yellow card) 53'	(substituted on) 25'
FW	13	Aung Kaung Mann		(substituted on) 59'
FW	14	Htet Phyo Wai		(substituted on) 59'
FW	12	Win Naing Tun		(substituted on) 81'
MF	16	Myat Kaung Khant		(substituted on) 81'
Manager:
(Germany) Antoine Hey

GK	16	Kevin Ray Mendoza
RB	29	Patrick Reichelt		(substituted off) 84'
CB	2	Jesper Nyholm
CB	13	Justin Baas
LB	11	Daisuke Sato	(yellow card) 90'
DM	6	Kevin Ingreso		(substituted off) 85'
DM	23	Martin Steuble	(yellow card) 43'	(substituted off) 85'
CM	14	Oskari Kekkonen		(substituted off) 72'
AM	19	Yrick Gallantes
AM	7	Iain Ramsay		(substituted off) 79'
CF	9	Bienvenido Marañón
Substitutions:
MF	30	Sandro Reyes		(substituted on) 72'
FW	8	Ángel Guirado		(substituted on) 79'
MF	10	Mike Ott		(substituted on) 84'
MF	22	Amin Nazari		(substituted on) 85'
DF	12	Amani Aguinaldo		(substituted on) 85'
Manager:
(England) Stewart Hall
