= Park Soon-tae =

South Korean footballer (born 1967)

Personal information
- Full name: Park Soon-tae
- Date of birth: 10 January 1967 (age 59)
- Place of birth: Seoul, South Korea

Youth career
- Seoul Gyeonghi High School
- Daegu University

Senior career*
Years	Team	Apps	(Gls)
- Busan Daewoo Royals
- Pohang Steelers
- Sangmu FC
- Hokkaido Consadole Sapporo

Managerial career
- 2002–2018: Daegu University
- 2023–2024: East Timor
- 2023–2024: East Timor U23
- * Club domestic league appearances and goals

Park Soon-tae or Park Sun-tae (born 10 January 1967) is a South Korean football manager.

He was previously a long-time manager of the Daegu University football team from 2002 to 2018.

In 2023, Park took over as manager of the East Timor national team. His tenure lasted until May 2024 when he was replaced by the returning Simón Elissetche.
