= Pedro Correia =

Pedro Correia or Pedro Corrêa may refer to:

- Pedro Correia (footballer, born 1974), Portuguese goalkeeper
- Pedro Correia (footballer, born 1987), Portuguese right-back
- Pedro Correia (footballer, born 1988), Portuguese forward
- Pedro Correia (politician) (born 1974), Portuguese politician
- Pedro Correia de Barros (1911–1968), Portuguese navy officer and colonial administrator
- Pedro Correia da Cunha (1440–1497), Portuguese nobleman
- Pedro Correia De Almeida, East Timorese football manager
- Pedro Correia Garção (1724–1772), Portuguese lyric poet
- Pedro Alves Correia or Pedro Martelo (born 1999), Portuguese football forward
- Ró-Ró (born 1990), Qatari footballer
- Pedro Corrêa (Brazilian politician) (born 1948), former Brazilian politician, a member of the Progressive Party
