= Marselino Ferdinan =

Indonesian footballer (born 2004)

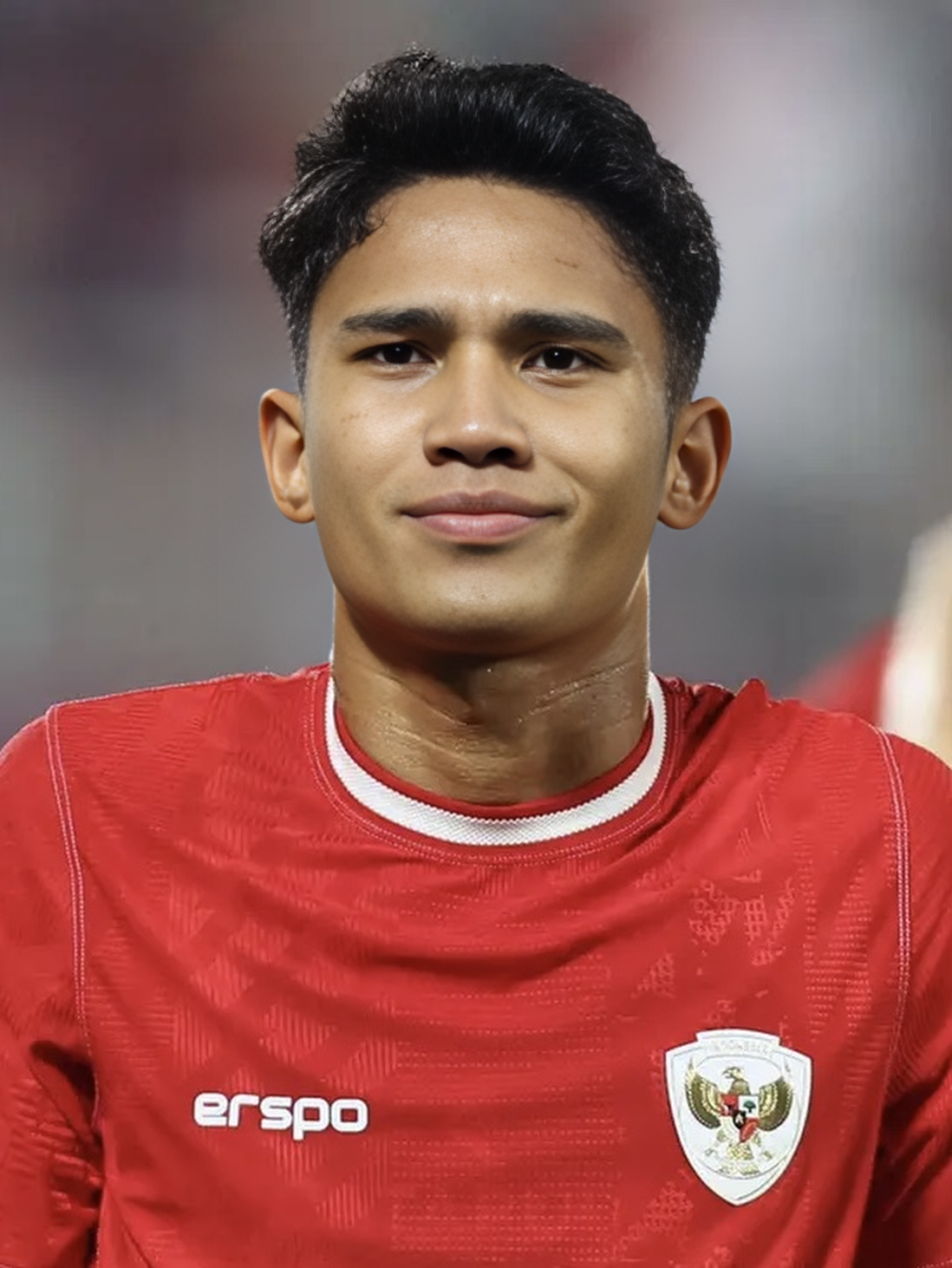
- Ferdinan playing for Indonesia U23 at the 2024 AFC U-23 Asian Cup

Personal information
- Full name: Marselino Ferdinan Philipus
- Date of birth: 9 September 2004 (age 22)
- Place of birth: Surabaya, Indonesia
- Height: 1.78 m (5 ft 10 in)
- Positions: Attacking midfielder; winger

Team information
- Current team: Persija Jakarta
- Number: 10

Youth career
- 2019–2021: Persebaya Surabaya

Senior career*
Years	Team	Apps	(Gls)
2021–2023	Persebaya Surabaya	30	(7)
2023–2024	Deinze	7	(1)
2024–2026	Oxford United	1	(0)
2025–2026	→ Trenčín (loan)	3	(0)
2026–	Persija Jakarta	0	(0)

International career^{‡}
2019–2020	Indonesia U16	11	(12)
2022–2023	Indonesia U20	12	(5)
2021–2024	Indonesia U23	25	(8)
2022–	Indonesia	41	(5)
Medal record
Men's football
Representing Indonesia
AFF U-16 Youth Championship
Third place	2019 Thailand
Southeast Asian Games
Gold medal – first place	2023 Cambodia	Team
Bronze medal – third place	2021 Vietnam	Team
- * Club domestic league appearances and goals as of 16 May 2026 ‡ National team caps and goals as of 9 June 2026

Marselino Ferdinan Philipus (born 9 September 2004), commonly known as Lino, is an Indonesian professional footballer who plays as an attacking midfielder or winger for Super League club Persija Jakarta, and the Indonesia national team.

Marselino started his senior career with Persebaya Surabaya in 2021, emerging through its youth system. During his first season he became a regular starter and won the Liga 1 Best Young Player Award and was named of as one of the 60 most talented and promising players by The Guardian in the same year. He joined Belgian side Deinze in February 2023. After one-year-and-a-half with Deinze, he joined Oxford United on a free transfer in 2024.

Marselino has represented Indonesia at various youth level, finishing third at the 2019 AFF U-15 Championship and winning a bronze medal at the 2021 Southeast Asian Games. He made his senior international debut in 2022, becoming the second youngest Indonesian debutant, and scored his first goal at the 2023 AFC Asian Cup qualifiers becoming the nation's youngest goalscorer.

== Club career ==
=== Persebaya Surabaya ===
Marselino broke into the senior team of Persebaya Surabaya in the 2021–22 Liga 1 season a few days after his 17th birthday, after two years in its youth system. On 12 September 2021, he made his Liga 1 match debut against Persikabo 1973 that ended in a 3–1 victory for Persebaya. On 6 November 2021, he scored his first league goal and saved his team from defeat in a 2–2 draw with rival Arema. On 4 December 2021, he scored the opening goal in the first half and recorded his first assist, to Taisei Marukawa, in Persebaya's 2–0 victory against Barito Putera at Manahan Stadium.

On 5 January 2022, Marselino provided another assist for Samsul Arif early in the first half, and scored in the second half of Persebaya's 3–1 win over Bali United. Nine days later, he was involved in Persebaya's 2–1 victory against PSM Makassar, scoring in the 55th minute. On 23 August, Marselino scored the only goal in a 1–0 home win against PSIS Semarang at the Gelora Bung Tomo Stadium and was named Man of the Match.

On 18 January 2023, Marselino scored a brace for the club in a 0–5 away win against Persita Tangerang.

=== Deinze ===
On 1 February 2023, Marselino officially joined Belgian First Division B club Deinze on a one-and-a-half-year contract. He made his Deinze debut against Jong Genk on 25 February, coming on as substitute for Jellert Van Landschoot in the 80th minute.

Marselino scored his first and only league goal for Deinze on 22 April 2023 against Virton in a 3–1 win.

=== Oxford United ===
On 19 August 2024, EFL Championship club Oxford United announced that Marselino had signed a two-year contract and had been assigned the number 28 jersey. On 11 January 2025, he debuted in the 2024–25 FA Cup match against Exeter City, coming on as a substitute at the 89th minute in a 1–3 loss.

On 3 May 2025, Marselino made his league debut, coming on as a substitute in the 77th minute for his compatriot Ole Romeny against Swansea City, and becoming the first Indonesian-born player to appear in an English second-tier match.

==== Loan to AS Trenčín ====
On 6 September 2025, it was announced that Marselino would be officially joining Slovak First Football League club AS Trenčín on a season-long loan deal.

On 18 October 2025, Marselino made his league debut, coming on as a substitute in the 46th minute for Adrián Fiala against Skalica.

== International career ==
=== Youth ===
Marselino first represented Indonesia at the age of 14 when he debuted for the Indonesia U-17 team in a match against Vietnam U-17 in the 2019 AFF U-15 Championship. He scored his first international goal in his that ended in a 2–0 victory.

In October 2021, Marselino joined the Indonesia U23 team for friendlies against Tajikistan U-23 and Nepal U-23 during preparations in Tajikistan for the 2022 AFC U-23 Asian Cup qualification. On 26 October 2021, he debuted in an official U-23 international game as a substitute in a 2–3 loss against Australia U23 in the 2022 AFC U-23 Asian Cup qualification.

Marselino was part of the Indonesia U-23 team that won a bronze medal in the 2021 Southeast Asian Games. He scored two goals in the six matches that he played in that tournament. He was again called up for the under-23 national team for the 2023 Southeast Asian Games, in which he scored two goals in the tournament and helped the team win the gold medal for the first time in 32 years.

Marselino was part of the Indonesia U-20 team that played in the 2023 AFC U-20 Asian Cup qualification. On 16 September 2022, he scored a brace against Hong Kong U-20. On 21 April 2024, Marselino scored a brace against Jordan U-23 in the 2024 AFC U-23 Asian Cup.

=== Senior ===
In January 2022, Marselino was called up to the Indonesia national team for two friendly matches against Timor-Leste in Bali. He debuted on 27 January 2022 in the first match that ended in 4–1 victory for Indonesia. He became the second youngest Indonesian to play for the senior national team at the age of 17 years, 4 months, 18 days – followed by Ronaldo Kwateh who debuted in the same match.

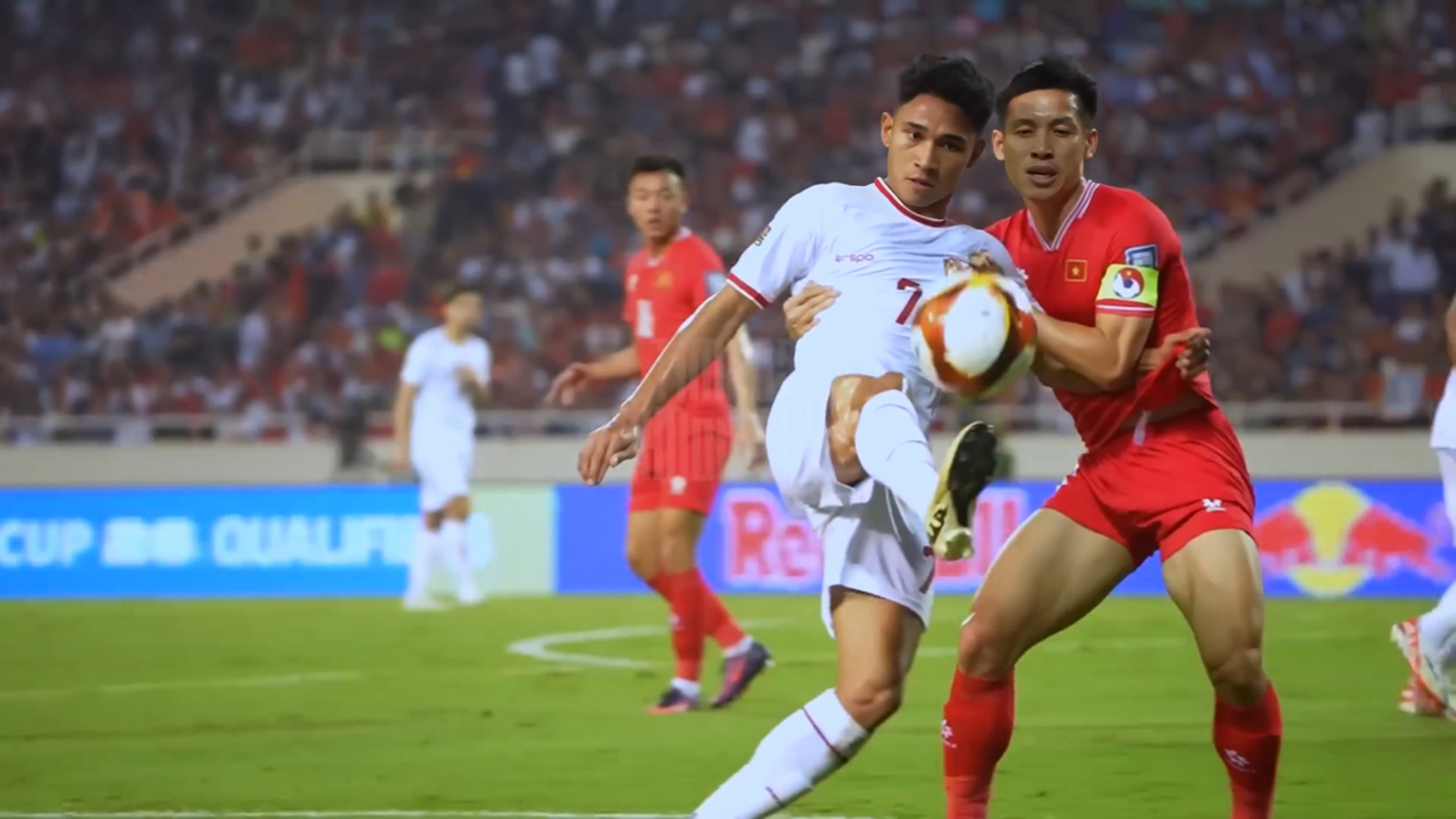
Marselino (left) contends for the ball while representing Indonesia in a match against Vietnam in 2024

On 14 June 2022, Marselino became the youngest goalscorer in the Indonesia senior team at the age of 17 years and 9 months, after scoring against Nepal in the 2023 AFC Asian Cup qualification in a 7–0 victory.

Marselino was called up for his first AFF Championship tournament by Shin Tae-yong. He scored a goal against the Philippines in the 2022 AFF Championship group stage, which became a social media trend and caught the attention of the Brazilian Richarlison due to his similar goal celebration. Marselino was also awarded Young Player of the Tournament.

On 15 January 2024, Marselino scored the equalizing goal against Iraq in an eventual 1–3 loss in the 2023 AFC Asian Cup group stage. He became the youngest goalscorer in the tournament and the nation's all-time youngest scorer in the AFC Asian Cup. On 19 November 2024, Marselino scored a brace in a 2–0 victory against Saudi Arabia, which secured Indonesia's first ever victory against Saudi Arabia as well as in the third round of 2026 FIFA World Cup qualification. He was also named the man of the match.

== Personal life ==
His traditional name based on the Ngada people's customs is Marselino Ferdinan Dhewa Kedhi. Marselino's mother comes from Surabaya, while his father comes from Ngada, East Nusa Tenggara. He spent his school years in Surabaya.

Marselino is the youngest child of four siblings. During the 2021–22 Liga 1 season, Oktafianus Fernando, his older brother, played for Persebaya Surabaya before Oktafianus left for PSIS Semarang the following season.

== Career statistics ==
=== Club ===
As of match played 19 November 2025

Club	Season	League			Cup		Continental		Other		Total	
Club	Season	Division	Apps	Goals	Apps	Goals	Apps	Goals	Apps	Goals	Apps	Goals
Persebaya Surabaya	2021–22	Liga 1	23	4	—		—		2 (Note: Appearances in Menpora Cup)	0	25	4
Persebaya Surabaya	2022–23	Liga 1	7	3	—		—		2 (Note: Appearances in Indonesia President's Cup)	0	9	3
Persebaya Surabaya	Total		30	7	0	0	—		4	0	34	7
Deinze	2022–23	Challenger Pro League	4	1	0	0	—		0	0	4	1
Deinze	2023–24	Challenger Pro League	3	0	0	0	—		0	0	3	0
Deinze	Total		7	1	0	0	—		0	0	7	1
Oxford United	2024–25	Championship	1	0	1 (Note: Appearances in FA Cup)	0	—		0	0	2	0
Trenčín (loan)	2025–26	Niké liga	2	0	1 (Note: Appearances in Slovak Cup)	0	—		0	0	3	0
Career total			40	8	2	0	0	0	5	2	47	8

=== International ===
As of match played 9 June 2026

Appearances and goals by national team and year
National team	Year	Apps	Goals
Indonesia	2022	9	1
Indonesia	2023	5	1
Indonesia	2024	21	3
Indonesia	2025	5	0
Indonesia	2026	1	0
Total		41	5

Scores and results list Indonesia's goal tally first, score column indicates score after each Marselino goal.

International senior goals

As of match played 19 November 2024

List of international goals scored by Marselino Ferdinan
No.	Date	Venue	Cap	Opponent	Score	Result	Competition
1	14 June 2022	Jaber Al-Ahmad International Stadium, Kuwait City, Kuwait	5	Nepal	7–0	7–0	2023 AFC Asian Cup qualification
2	2 January 2023	Rizal Memorial Stadium, Manila, Philippines	10	Philippines	2–0	2–1	2022 AFF Championship
3	15 January 2024	Ahmad bin Ali Stadium, Al Rayyan, Qatar	18	Iraq	1–1	1–3	2023 AFC Asian Cup
4	19 November 2024	Gelora Bung Karno Stadium, Surabaya, Indonesia	32	Saudi Arabia	1–0	2–0	2026 FIFA World Cup qualification
5	19 November 2024	Gelora Bung Karno Stadium, Surabaya, Indonesia	32	Saudi Arabia	2–0	2–0	2026 FIFA World Cup qualification

== Honours ==
Indonesia U-16

- AFF U-16 Youth Championship third place: 2019

Indonesia U-23

- SEA Games gold medal: 2023; bronze medal: 2021

Individual

- Liga 1 Goal of the Month: November 2021, August 2022, January 2023
- Liga 1 Young Player of the Month: December 2021, January 2022, January 2023
- Liga 1 Best Young Player: 2021–22
- APPI Indonesian Football Award Best 11: 2021–22
- APPI Indonesian Football Award Best Young Footballer: 2021–22
- AFF Championship Young Player of the Tournament: 2022
- PSSI Awards Young Player of the Year: 2026

Records

- Youngest player to score a goal for the Indonesia national team: 17 years 278 days (v Nepal, 14 June 2022)
