= Timor-Leste national under-23 football team =

Timor-Leste U-23
- Nickname(s): O Sol Nascente (The Rising Sun)
- Association: Federação de Futebol de Timor-Leste
- Confederation: AFC (Asia)
- Sub-confederation: AFF (Southeast Asia)
- Head coach: Emral Abus
- Captain: Filomeno Junior
- Most caps: Ramos Maxanches; Nilo Soares (18)
- Top scorer: Murilo de Almeida; Henrique Cruz; Mouzinho (3)
- Home stadium: Timor-Leste National Stadium
- FIFA code: TLS
First colours	Second colours

First international
- Malaysia 3–0 Timor-Leste (Bangkok, Thailand; 30 August 2005)

Biggest win
- Timor-Leste 6–0 Northern Mariana Islands (Xi'an, China; 9 September 2025); Timor-Leste 7–1 Macau (Ho Chi Minh City, Vietnam; 23 July 2017)

Biggest defeat
- Malaysia 11–0 Timor-Leste (Vientiane, Laos; 2 December 2009)

Asian Games
- Appearances: 2 (first in 2014)
- Best result: Group Stage (2014, 2018)

Southeast Asian Games
- Appearances: 8 (first in 2009)
- Best result: Group Stage (8 times)

ASEAN U-23 Championship
- Appearances: 4 (first in 2005)
- Best result: Third place (2022)

The Timor-Leste national Under-23 football team (Portuguese: Seleção Timorense de Futebol Sub-23) represents Timor-Leste (formerly known as East Timor) in international football competitions in the Olympic Games, Asian Games, Southeast Asian Games and any other under-23 international football tournaments. It is controlled by the Federação de Futebol de Timor-Leste, the governing body of football in the country. Timor-Leste is currently one of the weakest teams in the world. They won their first match on 5 November 2011 against Brunei, scoring 2–1.

== History ==
Football was firstly introduced during Portuguese Timor era where many local and the Portuguese colonial official played the sport for enjoyment. After the Portuguese leave the eastern part of the island of Timor, neighbouring Indonesia invaded and change their culture and identity. Timor-Leste gained full independence in 2002 after more than 20 years of occupation which resulted in a long running battle against Jakarta-led forces. The Timor-Leste U-23 team was invited to the 2005 AFF U-23 Youth Championship without any success, which is the first time that the team played in an international tournament. In 2009, the team entered the first Southeast Asian Games. Once again, they lost every match, including a 0–11 loss to Malaysia. Timor-Leste had major improvements at the 2011 SEA Games, when they used overseas players of Timorese descent from Brazil and Australia. These players contributed a lot to their successful run; especially from Murilo de Almeida who managed to score three goals. The team finished third in their group by recording their first win in their history, finishing above Laos, Brunei and the Philippines and had a goal difference of –4, which was a big improvement compared to their previous participation where the team finished last in their group with no wins from four games, scoring only once and having a goal difference of –28.

== Kits ==
Timor-Leste's traditional home kit includes a red shirt, black shorts and red or black socks. The away kits feature white or yellow shirts. At the 2009 SEA Games, their home kit resemble the one worn by the Belgium national team.

=== Kit evolution ===
Home Kit 2009–2010	Alternative Kit 2011

== Stadium ==
- Timor-Leste National Stadium (2002–present)

== Competitive record ==
=== Olympic Games ===
Olympic Games record									Qualification record						
Year	Result	Position	Pld	W	D	L	GF	GA	TQ	GP	W	D	L	GF	GA
(Spain) 1992	Part of Indonesia								Part of Indonesia						
(United States) 1996	Part of Indonesia								Part of Indonesia						
(Australia) 2000	Part of Indonesia								Part of Indonesia						
(Greece) 2004	did not enter								did not enter						
(China) 2008	did not enter								did not enter						
(United Kingdom) 2012	did not enter								did not enter						
(Brazil) 2016	did not qualify								2016 AFC U-23 Championship qualification	3	1	0	2	3	8
(Japan) 2020	did not qualify								2020 AFC U-23 Championship qualification	3	1	0	2	5	16
(France) 2024	did not qualify								2024 AFC U-23 Asian Cup qualification	3	1	0	2	5	10
(United States) 2028	To be determined								To be determined						
Total	—	0/8	–	–	–	–	–	–	AFC U-23 Asian Cup (From 2016)	9	3	0	6	13	34

=== Asian Games Record ===
(Under-23 Team since 2002)

Asian Games
Year	Result	Position	GP	W	D	L	GF	GA
(South Korea) 2002	did not enter							
(Qatar) 2006	did not enter							
(China) 2010	did not enter							
(South Korea) 2014	Group stage	28th	3	0	0	3	2	13
(Indonesia) 2018	Group stage	24th	3	0	0	3	3	15
(China) 2022	did not enter							
Total	Group stage	2/5	6	0	0	6	5	28

=== AFC U-23 Asian Cup Record ===
AFC U-23 Championship									Qualification record					
Year	Result	Position	Pld	W	D	L	GF	GA	Pld	W	D	L	GF	GA
(Oman) 2013	did not qualify								5	1	0	4	5	9
(Qatar) 2016	did not qualify								3	1	0	2	3	8
(China) 2018	did not qualify								3	1	1	1	7	5
(Thailand) 2020	did not qualify								3	1	0	2	5	16
(Uzbekistan) 2022	did not qualify								3	1	1	1	3	8
(Qatar) 2024	did not qualify								3	1	0	2	5	10
(Saudi Arabia) 2026	Did not enter								Did not enter					
(Japan) 2028	To be determined								To be determined					
Total	–	0/8	0	0	0	0	0	0	20	6	2	12	28	56

=== SEA Games Record ===
(Under-23 Team since 2001)

Southeast Asian Games
Year	Result	Position	GP	W	D	L	GF	GA
(Philippines) 2005	Did not enter							
(Thailand) 2007	Did not enter							
(Laos) 2009	Group stage	9th	4	0	0	4	1	28
(Indonesia) 2011	Group stage	6th	5	2	0	3	4	8
(Myanmar) 2013	Group stage	7th	4	1	1	2	5	8
(Singapore) 2015	Group stage	9th	5	1	0	4	4	10
(Malaysia) 2017	Group stage	9th	5	1	0	4	2	8
(Philippines) 2019	Group stage	10th	4	0	0	4	2	18
(Vietnam) 2021	Group stage	10th	4	0	0	4	3	13
(Cambodia) 2023	Group stage	7th	4	1	0	3	3	8
Total	Group stage	8/10	35	6	1	28	24	101

=== ASEAN U-23 Championship record ===
ASEAN U-23 Championship
Year	Round	Position	GP	W	D	L	GF	GA
(Thailand) 2005	Group stage	8th	3	0	0	3	1	14
(Cambodia) 2019	Group stage	6th	3	1	0	2	1	5
(Cambodia) 2022	Third place	3rd	4	2	2	0	7	3
(Thailand) 2023	Group stage	9th	2	0	0	2	1	4
(Indonesia) 2025	Group stage	9th	2	0	1	1	4	8
Total	Third Place	4/4	12	3	2	7	14	34

== Coaching staff ==
Position	Name
Head coach	(Indonesia) Emral Abus
Assistant coach	(Timor-Leste) Miro Baldo Bento
Goalkeeping coach	(Timor-Leste) Derson Gusmão
Physiotherapist	(Timor-Leste) Adou Costa
Media Officer	(Timor-Leste) Mario Filipe Belo
Administrator	(Timor-Leste) Hasan Cesario
Official	(Timor-Leste) Adou Marques
Kitman	(Timor-Leste) Fablo Freitas

== Players ==
=== Current squad ===
The following 23 players were called up for the 2025 SEA Games.

No.	Pos.	Player	Date of birth (age)	Caps	Goals	Club
	GK	Filonito Nogueira	16 November 2004 (aged 21)	2	0	(East Timor Football Federation) SLB Laulara
	GK	Egidio Luro	5 December 2008 (aged 16)	2	0	(East Timor Football Federation) Emmanuel
	DF	Jackson Fowler	3 September 2004 (aged 21)	4	0	(Football Australia) Sydney Olympic
	DF	Aniso Monteiro	1 July 2003 (aged 22)	0	0	(East Timor Football Federation) Assalam
	DF	Mário Quintão	18 February 2004 (aged 21)	9	0	(East Timor Football Federation) Emmanuel
	DF	Oatnasio Guterres	11 June 2006 (aged 19)	3	1	(Irish Football Association) Longhgall
	DF	Anizo Correia	23 May 2003 (aged 22)	7	0	(East Timor Football Federation) Ponta Leste
	DF	Ricardo Bianco	15 January 2006 (aged 19)	6	1	(East Timor Football Federation) Ponta Leste
	DF	Ryan Jom	3 March 2005 (aged 20)	0	0	(Football Australia) Rydalmere Lions
	MF	Palomito Ribeiro	14 June 2005 (aged 20)	4	0	(East Timor Football Federation) Emmanuel
	MF	Tristan Xavi	26 July 2008 (aged 17)	2	0	(Football Australia) Western Sydney Wanderers
	MF	Zenivio	22 April 2005 (aged 20)	15	3	(Football Association of Singapore) Tanjong Pagar United
	MF	Jonatas Pereira	24 June 2003 (aged 22)	1	0	(East Timor Football Federation) Emmanuel
	MF	Freteliano	9 August 2004 (aged 21)	8	1	(East Timor Football Federation) Emmanuel
	MF	Gali Freitas	31 December 2004 (aged 20)	9	4	(Football Association of Indonesia) Persebaya Surabaya
	MF	Leonio Freitas	17 April 2007 (aged 18)	3	0	(East Timor Football Federation) Ponta Leste
	FW	Serafin Brito	unknown	2	0	(East Timor Football Federation) DIT
	FW	Vabio Canavaro	25 January 2007 (aged 18)	0	0	(East Timor Football Federation) Ponta Leste
	FW	Paul Godinho	unknown	0	0	(East Timor Football Federation) Santa Cruz
	FW	Luís Figo	17 April 2005 (aged 20)	7	2	(East Timor Football Federation) Ponta Leste
	FW	Olagar Xavier	18 May 2003 (aged 22)	0	0	(Philippine Football Federation) Aguilas–UMak
	FW	Alexandro Bakhito	1 June 2006 (aged 19)	5	3	(East Timor Football Federation) SLB Laulara

=== Recent call-ups ===
Pos.	Player	Date of birth (age)	Caps	Goals	Club	Latest call-up
Notes: ^{INJ} Withdrew due to injury; ^{PRE} Preliminary squad / standby

== Results and fixtures ==
The following is a list of match results in the last 12 months, as well as any future matches that have been scheduled.

Win Draw Loss

=== 2025 ===
3 December 2025 SEA Games	Timor-Leste	1–6	Thailand	Bangkok, Thailand
19:00 UTC+7	Palomito 90+3'	Report	Yotsakorn B. 44', 70', 72'; Siraphop 49'; Iklas 60'; Kakana 83'	Stadium: Rajamangala Stadium; Attendance: 7,741; Referee: Choi Hyun-jai (South Korea

6 December 2025 SEA Games	Singapore	1–3	Timor-Leste	Bangkok, Thailand
19:00 UTC+7	Amir 11'	Report	Canavaro 19'; Correia 42'; Olagar 45+1'	Stadium: Rajamangala Stadium; Referee: Asker Nadjafaliev (Uzbekistan)

== List of coaches ==
Coach	Coaching period	Pld	W	D	L	Achievements
(Portugal) José Luís	2005	3	0	0	3	2005 AFF U-23 Youth Championship – Round 1 (First Time)
(Timor-Leste) Manuel da Costa Soares	2009–2010	4	0	0	4	2009 Southeast Asian Games – Round 1 (First Time)
(Brazil) Antonio Carlos Vieira	2011–2012	5	2	0	3	2011 Southeast Asian Games – First Win with Brunei
(Japan) Norio Tsukitate	2012	5	1	0	4	2013 AFC U-22 Championship qualification – Did not qualify
(Brazil) Emerson Alcântara	2013–2014	6	2	2	2	2013 Southeast Asian Games – First Draw with Indonesia
(Japan) Takuma Koga	2014	3	0	0	3	2014 Asian Games – Round 1 (First Time)
(Brazil) Fábio Magrão	2015–2016	8	2	0	6	2016 AFC U-23 Championship qualification – Did not qualify 2015 Southeast Asian Games – Round 1
(South Korea) Kim Shin-hwan	2017–2018	3	1	1	1	2018 AFC U-23 Championship qualification – Did not qualify
(Japan) Norio Tsukitate	2018–2019	3	0	0	3	2018 Asian Games – Group stage

== See also ==
- Timor-Leste national football team
- Timor-Leste women's national football team
- Timor-Leste national under-20 football team
- Timor-Leste national under-17 football team
- Timor-Leste women's national under-20 football team
- Timor-Leste women's national under-17 football team
