= 2019 AFF U-15 Championship =

Tournament details
- Host country: Thailand
- City: Chonburi
- Dates: 27 July – 9 August
- Teams: 12 (from 1 sub-confederation)
- Venue: 2 (in 1 host city)

Final positions
- Champions: Malaysia (2nd title)
- Runners-up: Thailand
- Third place: Indonesia
- Fourth place: Vietnam

Tournament statistics
- Matches played: 34
- Goals scored: 109 (3.21 per match)
- Attendance: 7,022 (207 per match)
- Top scorer(s): (Timor-Leste) Gali Freitas (7 goals)
- Fair play award: Vietnam

The 2019 AFF U-15 Championship was the fourteenth edition of the AFF U-16 Championship (second edition of the under-15 era), the annual international youth association football championship organised by the ASEAN Football Federation for men's under-15 national teams of Southeast Asia.

A total of 12 teams played in the tournament, with players born on or after 1 January 2004 eligible to participate. Each match had a duration of 80 minutes, consisting of two halves of 40 minutes.

Malaysia beat Thailand 2–1 in the final for their second title in the championship.

== Participant teams ==
There was no qualification, and all entrants advanced to the final tournament. The following 12 teams from member associations of the ASEAN Football Federation entered the tournament.

Team	Association	App	Previous best performance
Australia	FF Australia	7th	Winners (2008, 2016)
Brunei	FA Brunei DS	8th	Group stage (7 times)
Cambodia	FF Cambodia	10th	Fourth place (2016)
Indonesia	FA Indonesia	10th	Winners (2018)
Laos	Lao FF	12th	Runners-up (2002, 2007, 2011)
Malaysia	FA Malaysia	11th	Winners (2013)
Myanmar	Myanmar FF	11th	Winners (2002, 2005)
Philippines	Philippine FF	8th	Group stage (7 times)
Singapore	FA Singapore	10th	Fourth place (2008, 2011)
Thailand (H)	FA Thailand	10th	Winners (2007, 2011, 2015)
Timor-Leste	FF Timor-Leste	7th	Third place (2010)
Vietnam	Vietnam FF	12th	Winners (2006, 2010, 2017)

== Venues ==
The competition is being played at two venues in Chonburi, Chonburi Province: Chonburi Campus Stadium and Chonburi Stadium (in Mueang Chonburi).

Chonburi Province	Mueang Chonburi

Group stage and Knockout stage	Group stage
Chonburi Campus Stadium 1	Chonburi Campus Stadium 2
13°24′41″N 100°59′34″E	13°20′14″N 100°57′18″E
Capacity: 12,000	Capacity: 8,680

== Officials ==
Referees

- Abdul Hakim Mohd Haidi (Brunei)
- Chy Samdy (Cambodia)
- Khoun Virak (Cambodia)
- Yudi Nurcahya (Indonesia)
- Khamsing Xaiyavongsy (Laos)
- Kyaw Zwall Lwin (Myanmar)
- Soe Lin Aung (Myanmar)
- Linjun Talaver (Philippines)
- Steve Supresencia (Philippines)
- Songkran Bunmeekiart (Thailand)
- Torpong Somsing (Thailand)
- Trường Hồng Vũ (Vietnam)

Assistant referees

- Sun Daravuth (Cambodia)
- Beni Andriko (Indonesia)
- I Gede Selamet Raharja (Indonesia)
- Phonesooksin Teso (Laos)
- Somphavanh Louanglath (Laos)
- Mohd Hariff Md Akhir (Malaysia)
- Hein Min Tun (Myanmar)
- Zayar Maung (Myanmar)
- Giovanni Lachica (Philippines)
- Chotrawee Tongduang (Thailand)
- Poonsawat Samransuk (Thailand)
- Phạm Hoài Tâm (Vietnam)

== Draw ==
Pot 1	Pot 2	Pot 3	Pot 4	Pot 5	Pot 6
Indonesia; Thailand	Malaysia; Myanmar	Vietnam; Laos	Timor-Leste; Cambodia	Singapore; Brunei	Philippines; Australia

== Group stage ==
The top two teams of each group advance to the semi-finals.

Tiebreakers

The teams are ranked according to points (3 points for a win, 1 point for a draw, 0 points for a loss). If tied on points, tiebreakers are applied in the following order:

1. Goal difference in all the group matches;
2. Greater number of goals scored in all the group matches;
3. Result of the direct match between the teams concerned;
4. Kicks from the penalty mark if the teams concerned are still on the field of play.
5. Lowest score using Fair Play Criteria;
6. Drawing of lots.
- All matches held in Thailand.
- All times are local, UTC+7.

=== Group A ===
Pos	Team	Pld	W	D	L	GF	GA	GD	Pts	Qualification
1	Indonesia	5	4	1	0	15	1	+14	13	Knockout stage
2	Vietnam	5	4	0	1	8	3	+5	12	Knockout stage
3	Timor-Leste	5	3	1	1	15	4	+11	10	
4	Singapore	5	1	1	3	3	10	−7	4	
5	Myanmar	5	1	1	3	2	11	−9	4	
6	Philippines	5	0	0	5	4	18	−14	0	

Source: aseanfootball.org
Rules for classification: Tiebreakers
27 July 2019
15:00

Vietnam	0–2	Indonesia
	Report	Valeron 40+2'; Marselino 46'

Chonburi Campus Stadium 1, Chonburi
Attendance: 85
Referee: Abdul Hakim Mohd Haidi (Brunei)
27 July 2019
15:30

Timor-Leste	7–1	Philippines
Freitas 4', 42', 55', 58'; Brito 16'; Vong 53'; Kefi 56'	Report	Tom 40'

Chonburi Campus Stadium 2, Chonburi
Attendance: 34
Referee: Songkran Bunmeekiart (Thailand)
27 July 2019
18:00

Myanmar	0–0	Singapore
	Report

Chonburi Campus Stadium 1, Chonburi
Attendance: 232
Referee: Khoun Virak (Cambodia)

29 July 2019
15:00

Indonesia	3–0	Singapore
Marselino 18'; Wahyu 71'; Faizal 79'	Report

Chonburi Campus Stadium 1, Chonburi
Attendance: 102
Referee: Khamsing Xaiyavongsy (Laos)
29 July 2019
15:30

Myanmar	1–3	Timor-Leste
Lai Wai Phone 76'	Report	Kefi 37', 46', 69'

Chonburi Campus Stadium 2, Chonburi
Attendance: 249
Referee: Torpong Somsing (Thailand)
29 July 2019
18:00

Vietnam	3–1	Philippines
Phạm Văn Phong 25'; Cái Văn Quỳ 47', 49'	Report	Nuñez 79'

Chonburi Campus Stadium 1, Chonburi
Attendance: 150
Referee: Chy Samdy (Cambodia)

31 July 2019
15:30

Singapore	0–1	Vietnam
	Report	Lê Minh Toàn 80' (pen.)

Chonburi Campus Stadium 2, Chonburi
Attendance: 20
Referee: Khoun Virak (Cambodia)
31 July 2019
18:00

Philippines	0–1	Myanmar
	Report	Yan Naing Tun 74'

Chonburi Campus Stadium 1, Chonburi
Attendance: 150
Referee: Abdul Hakim Mohd Haidi (Brunei)
31 July 2019
15:00

Indonesia	1–1	Timor-Leste
Marselino 45'	Report	Freitas 56'

Chonburi Campus Stadium 1, Chonburi
Attendance: 50
Referee: Songkran Bunmeekiart (Thailand)

2 August 2019
18:00

Timor-Leste	4–0	Singapore
Freitas 13' (pen.), 28'; Mota 43'; Brito 79'	Report

Chonburi Campus Stadium 1, Chonburi
Attendance: 75
Referee: Chy Samdy (Cambodia)
2 August 2019
15:00

Philippines	0–4	Indonesia
	Report	Marselino 25'; Wahyu 30'; Marcell 38' (pen.); Alexandro 65'

Chonburi Campus Stadium 1, Chonburi
Attendance: 76
Referee: Torpong Somsing (Thailand)
2 August 2019
15:30

Myanmar	0–3	Vietnam
	Report	Cái Văn Quỳ 3'; Nguyễn Phú Nhã 46'; Võ Anh Quân 71'

Chonburi Campus Stadium 2, Chonburi
Attendance: 70
Referee: Khamsing Xaiyavongsy (Laos)

4 August 2019
15:30

Singapore	3–2	Philippines
Seng 38'; Amir 48'; Ethan 68'	Report	Dadivas 63'; Dalapo 66'

Chonburi Campus Stadium 2, Chonburi
Attendance: 51
Referee: Abdul Hakim Mohd Haidi (Brunei)
4 August 2019
18:00

Vietnam	1–0	Timor-Leste
Cái Văn Quỳ 77'	Report

Chonburi Campus Stadium 1, Chonburi
Attendance: 75
Referee: Songkran Bunmeekiart (Thailand)
4 August 2019
15:00

Indonesia	5–0	Myanmar
Faizal 9', 42'; Marselino 31'; Ruy 56'; Valeron 80'	Report

Chonburi Campus Stadium 1, Chonburi
Attendance: 85
Referee: Khoun Virak (Cambodia)

=== Group B ===
Pos	Team	Pld	W	D	L	GF	GA	GD	Pts	Qualification
1	Malaysia	5	3	2	0	15	2	+13	11	Knockout stage
2	Thailand (H)	5	3	2	0	15	4	+11	11	Knockout stage
3	Australia	5	3	1	1	11	5	+6	10	
4	Laos	5	2	1	2	8	6	+2	7	
5	Cambodia	5	0	1	4	2	13	−11	1	
6	Brunei	5	0	1	4	2	23	−21	1	

Source: aseanfootball.org
Rules for classification: Tiebreakers
(H) Hosts
28 July 2019
18:00

Laos	1–2	Thailand
Phomma 9'	Report	Kakana 43', 65'

Chonburi Campus Stadium 1, Chonburi
Attendance: 550
Referee: Steve Supresencia (Philippines)
28 July 2019
15:30

Cambodia	1–3	Australia
Pusateri 64' (o.g.)	Report	D'Argenio 12'; Helweh 24', 31'

Chonburi Campus Stadium 2, Chonburi
Referee: Soe Lin Aung (Myanmar)
28 July 2019
15:00

Malaysia	8–0	Brunei
Harry 6', 13', 46'; Zubaidi 40+1', 40+3'; Hakim 40+4'; Nabil 57'; Aliff 72'	Report

Chonburi Campus Stadium 1, Chonburi
Attendance: 50
Referee: Trường Hồng Vũ (Vietnam)

30 July 2019
18:00

Thailand	7–1	Brunei
Minhart 3', 51', 80+1'; Wongwat 12'; Anucha 18'; Theekawin 26'; Kakana 35'	Report	Syaherrul 40+1'

Chonburi Campus Stadium 1, Chonburi
Attendance: 215
Referee: Kyaw Zwall Lwin (Myanmar)
30 July 2019
15:30

Malaysia	2–0	Cambodia
Izrin 63'; Aliff 66'	Report

Chonburi Campus Stadium 2, Chonburi
Attendance: 7
Referee: Linjun Talaver (Philippines)
30 July 2019
15:00

Laos	0–3	Australia
	Report	Menelaou 33'; Oliveira 75'; Segecic 80'

Chonburi Campus Stadium 1, Chonburi
Attendance: 75
Referee: Yudi Nurcahya (Indonesia)

1 August 2019
15:30

Brunei	0–3	Laos
	Report	Anantaza 26'; Thipphachan 40', 47'

Chonburi Campus Stadium 2, Chonburi
Attendance: 10
Referee: Trường Hồng Vũ (Vietnam)
1 August 2019
15:00

Australia	0–3	Malaysia
	Report	Daniel 4' (pen.); Nabil 28'; Izrin 70'

Chonburi Campus Stadium 1, Chonburi
Attendance: 80
Referee: Steve Supresencia (Philippines)
1 August 2019
18:00

Thailand	4–0	Cambodia
Wongwat 19'; Kongpop 49'; Thanawat Sa. 77'; Chonnapat 80'	Report

Chonburi Campus Stadium 1, Chonburi
Attendance: 150
Referee: Soe Lin Aung (Myanmar)

3 August 2019
15:00

Cambodia	1–1	Brunei
Sovanpanha 69'	Report	Syaherrul 31'

Chonburi Campus Stadium 1, Chonburi
Attendance: 40
Referee: Kyaw Zwall Lwin (Myanmar)
3 August 2019
18:00

Australia	1–1	Thailand
Taylor 4'	Report	Theekawin 40'

Chonburi Campus Stadium 1, Chonburi
Attendance: 550
Referee: Yudi Nurcahya (Indonesia)
3 August 2019
15:30

Malaysia	1–1	Laos
Vongsakda 80' (o.g.)	Report	Thipphachan 33'

Chonburi Campus Stadium 2, Chonburi
Attendance: 64
Referee: Linjun Talaver (Philippines)

5 August 2019
15:30

Brunei	0–4	Australia
	Report	Mostofi 20', 65'; Gomez 32'; Oliveira 54'

Chonburi Campus Stadium 2, Chonburi
Attendance: 93
Referee: Soe Lin Aung (Myanmar)
5 August 2019
15:00

Laos	3–0	Cambodia
Phomma 20'; Damoth 28'; Thipphachan 80'	Report

Chonburi Campus Stadium 1, Chonburi
Attendance: 34
Referee: Trường Hồng Vũ (Vietnam)
5 August 2019
18:00

Thailand	1–1	Malaysia
Pornsawan 18'	Report	Sittha 80+3' (o.g.)

Chonburi Campus Stadium 1, Chonburi
Attendance: 320
Referee: Steve Supresencia (Philippines)

== Knockout stage ==
In the knockout stage, the penalty shoot-outs are used to decide the winner if necessary (extra time is not used).

=== Bracket ===
Semi-finals
7 August – Chonburi
Indonesia	0
Thailand	2
7 August – Chonburi
Malaysia	3
Vietnam	1

Final
9 August – Chonburi
Thailand	1
Malaysia	2
Third place match
9 August – Chonburi
Indonesia (p)	0 (3)
Vietnam	0 (2)

=== Semi-finals ===
7 August 2019
18:00

Indonesia	0–2	Thailand
	Report	Niphitphon 52', 70'

Chonburi Campus Stadium 1, Chonburi
Attendance: 590
Referee: Khamsing Xaiyavongsy (Laos)
7 August 2019
15:00

Malaysia	3–1	Vietnam
Nabil 14', 49'; Aliff 77'	Report	Phạm Văn Phong 9'

Chonburi Campus Stadium 1, Chonburi
Attendance: 105
Referee: Abdul Hakim Mohd Haidi (Brunei)

=== Third place match ===
9 August 2019
15:00

Indonesia	0–0	Vietnam
	Report
Penalties
Resa (penalty scored); Alfin (penalty missed); Marcell (penalty missed); Wahyu (penalty scored); Athallah (penalty scored)	3–2	(penalty missed) Hà Văn Việt; (penalty scored) Nguyễn Văn Bảy; (penalty missed) Nguyễn Phú Nhã; (penalty scored) Nguyễn Đình Đức; (penalty missed) Nguyễn Công Sơn

Chonburi Campus Stadium 1, Chonburi
Attendance: 85
Referee: Torpong Somsing (Thailand)

=== Final ===
9 August 2019
18:00

Thailand	1–2	Malaysia
Theekawin 16'; Pakpoom (yellow card) 55' (yellow-red card) 79'; Kongpop (red card) 80+4'	Report	Izrin 68'; Nabil 80'; Khairil (red card) 80+4'

Chonburi Campus Stadium 1, Chonburi
Attendance: 2,500
Referee: Steve Supresencia (Philippines)

== Winner ==
2019 AFF U-15 Youth Championship winners

Malaysia
Second title

== Awards ==
Top Scorer Award	Fair Play Award
(Timor-Leste) Gali Freitas	Vietnam

== Goalscorers ==
There were 109 goals scored in 34 matches, for an average of 3.21 goals per match.

7 goals

- (Timor-Leste) Gali Freitas

5 goals

- (Indonesia) Marselino Ferdinan
- (Malaysia) Muhammad Nabil Qayyum Zainuddin

4 goals

- (Laos) Thipphachan Khambai One
- (Timor-Leste) Alexandro Kefi
- (Vietnam) Cái Văn Quỳ

3 goals

- (Indonesia) Mochammad Faizal Shaifullah
- (Malaysia) Aliff Izwan
- (Malaysia) Muhammad Harry Danish Mohd Haizon
- (Malaysia) Muhammad Izrin Ibrahim
- (Thailand) Kakana Khamyok
- (Thailand) Minhart Kadeeroj
- (Thailand) Theekawin Chansri

2 goals

- (Australia) Aiden Mostofi
- (Australia) Bernardo Oliveira
- (Australia) Daniel Helweh
- (Brunei) Syaherrul Affendy Syahmirul Nizam
- (Indonesia) Muhamad Valeron
- (Indonesia) Wahyu Agong Drajat Mulyono
- (Laos) Phomma Khotphoutone
- (Malaysia) Zubaidi Mohd Buang
- (Thailand) Niphitphon Wongpanya
- (Thailand) Wongwat Jaroenthaweesuk
- (Timor-Leste) Serafin da Silva Brito
- (Vietnam) Phạm Văn Phong

1 goal

- (Australia) Adrian Segecic
- (Australia) Alexander Menelaou
- (Australia) Clayton Taylor
- (Australia) Massimo D'Argenio
- (Australia) Sebastian Gomez
- (Cambodia) Heng Sovanpanha
- (Indonesia) Alexandro Felix Kamuru
- (Indonesia) Marcell Januar Putra
- (Indonesia) Ruy Arianto
- (Laos) Anantaza Siphongphan
- (Laos) Damoth Thongkhamsavath
- (Malaysia) Muhammad Daniel Edzuan Mohd Anuar
- (Malaysia) Wan Muhammad Hakim Wan Mohd Nazril
- (Myanmar) Lai Wai Phone
- (Myanmar) Yan Naing Tun
- (Philippines) Domic Tom
- (Philippines) Harry Nuñez
- (Philippines) Mark Dadivas
- (Philippines) Uriel Dalapo
- (Singapore) Amir Syafiz Abdul Rashid
- (Singapore) Ethan Henry Pinto
- (Singapore) Seng Hong Kai
- (Thailand) Anucha Somonwat
- (Thailand) Chonnapat Buaphan
- (Thailand) Kongpop Soirak
- (Thailand) Pornsawan Saenkla
- (Thailand) Thanawat Saipet
- (Timor-Leste) William Quintas Vong
- (Timor-Leste) Zenivo Mota
- (Vietnam) Lê Minh Toàn
- (Vietnam) Nguyễn Phú Nhã
- (Vietnam) Võ Anh Quân

1 own goal

- (Australia) Francesco Pusateri (against Cambodia)
- (Laos) Vongsakda Chanthaleuxay (against Malaysia)
- (Thailand) Sittha Boonlha (against Malaysia)

== Final ranking ==
Pos	Team	Pld	W	D	L	GF	GA	GD	Pts	Final result
1	Malaysia	7	5	2	0	20	4	+16	17	Champion
2	Thailand	7	4	2	1	18	6	+12	14	Runner up
3	Indonesia	7	4	2	1	15	3	+12	14	Third place
4	Vietnam	7	4	1	2	9	6	+3	13	Fourth place
5	Timor-Leste	5	3	1	1	15	4	+11	10	Eliminated in group stage
6	Australia	5	3	1	1	11	5	+6	10	Eliminated in group stage
7	Laos	5	2	1	2	8	6	+2	7	Eliminated in group stage
8	Singapore	5	1	1	3	3	10	−7	4	Eliminated in group stage
9	Myanmar	5	1	1	3	2	11	−9	4	Eliminated in group stage
10	Cambodia	5	0	1	4	2	13	−11	1	Eliminated in group stage
11	Brunei	5	0	1	4	2	23	−21	1	Eliminated in group stage
12	Philippines	5	0	0	5	4	18	−14	0	Eliminated in group stage

Source: Group stage, Knockout stage

== Incidents and controversies ==
On 29 July 2019, the ASEAN Football Federation (AFF) received official protest from two participating teams regarding the eligibility of an East Timorese player in the ongoing tournament. The protest was subsequently admitted upon compliance of the procedural requirements set out in the 2019 Tournament Regulations with the AFF began to carrying out the necessary investigation and have requested the parties involved to collaborate to establish the facts. On 3 August, the AFF further stated that the relevant documents requested from the player and his team have been delivered and acknowledged by the AFF secretariat. In accordance to the tournament regulations, the conclusion of the investigation will be decided by the AFF Disciplinary and Ethics Committee. On 4 August, the AFF announced their findings that the said player is deemed to be eligible to participate in the tournament in accordance with Article 5.1 as stated in the tournament regulations and ruled the protest lodged by two countries as unfounded and dismissed it accordingly.

On 9 August, the final match between Thailand and Malaysia was marred with ugly incident that resulted in Thai player Kongpop Sroirak and Malaysian player Khairil Zain being both issued a red card.
