= Murilo de Almeida =

Brazilian-born East Timorese footballer

Personal information
- Full name: Murilo Ribeiro de Almeida
- Date of birth: 21 January 1989 (age 37)
- Place of birth: Presidente Prudente, Brazil
- Height: 1.85 m (6 ft 1 in)
- Position: Forward

Youth career
- Bahia

Senior career*
Years	Team	Apps	(Gls)
2009–2011	Bahia	0	(0)
2011–2012	Persiraja Banda Aceh	25	(7)
2012–2013	Busaiteen Club	3	(1)
2013	Magway FC	10	(4)
2013–2014	Mesaimeer		
2014	Ettifaq FC	6	(0)
2015	Oita Trinita	0	(0)
2015	→ AC Nagano Parceiro (loan)	0	(0)
2015	South China	1	(0)
2015–2016	Busaiteen Club		
2016–2017	Al Tadhamon SC		
2017–2018	Chennai City	8	(1)
2018	Marcerra Kuantan	5	(0)
2020	Luverdense	3	(0)

International career^{‡}
2011–2013	Timor-Leste U-23	4	(3)
2012–2015	Timor-Leste	8	(6)
- * Club domestic league appearances and goals as of 25 February 2018 ‡ National team caps and goals as of 15:32, 27 September 2015 (UTC)

Murilo Ribeiro de Almeida (born January 21, 1989) simply known as Murilo de Almeida, is a footballer who played as a forward. Born in Brazil, he played for the Timor-Leste national team and is the country's leading goal scorer.

== Personal life ==
Murilo was born at Presidente Prudente, Brazil, and naturalized East Timorese by fellow Brazilian Antônio Carlos Vieira, who was then the coach of Timor-Leste.

== Club career ==
=== Earlier career ===
Murilo de Almeida began his professional club career at Esporte Clube Bahia in Brazil but has not appeared in a single league match.

=== Persiraja ===
In 2011, he signed for Persiraja Banda Aceh. Murilo made his debut for Persiraja Banda Aceh in a match versus Persijap Jepara. He score at his opening match debut; In 69 minutes, Murilo make a surprised goal. Persiraja finished 2-1 with Persijap. Murilo de Almeida was sent off in the 16th minute, after a protest with the referee because of his excessive diving at the goal post in Persija IPL match. Referee reaction was pulling out two yellow cards.

=== Busaiteen ===
Between 2012 and 2013, he signed with and played for Busaiteen Club in the Bahraini Premier League. After his departure, in the 2013 edition of Bahraini Premier League was won by Busaiteen.

=== Magwe ===
In 2013, he moved to Myanmar and played for Magwe FC and scored 4 goals in 10 league matches.

=== Al-Mesaimeer and Ettifaq ===
During the 2013-14 Qatari Second Division, he represented Al-Mesaimeer SC and later moved to Saudi giants Al-Ettifaq FC in 2014. With Ettifaq, he played only 6 games in the Saudi Professional League.

=== Japanese leagues and Hongkong ===
In 2015, he signed with J1 League outfit Oita Trinita and later played for AC Nagano Parceiro in the J3 League on loan from Oita.

Murilo later moved to South China AA in the Hong Kong Premier League and also appeared with the club in 2015 AFC Cup.

=== Later career ===
Murilo came back to his previous club Busaiteen Club in the Bahraini Premier League and stayed there until 2016. He later moved to Kuwait and joined Al Tadhamon SC.

=== Chennai City ===
In 2017, he signed with Indian I-League club Chennai City FC on a two-year deal. He appeared in 8 I-League matches and scored a single goal against Churchill Brothers SC. He was also impressive in his team’s 2-1 victory over Mohun Bagan AC in January.

== International career ==
Murilo made his international debut for Timor-Leste national under-23 football team in the 2011 SEA Games, where the first match was against Brunei U23. Murilo is known for his quick and fast attack. Murilo scored 3 goals during the 2011 SEA Games. Recently, Murilo received a red card for bad conduct during the third match which was against Vietnam U23. He scored 3 goals in 4 matches for the Timor-Leste U23 between 2011 and 2013.

Murilo made his senior international debut for Timor-Leste national football team on 5 October 2012, against Cambodia, where he struck twice late in the first half against Cambodia at the Youth Training Centre to set Timor Leste on the way to their first-ever win in the competition as he glanced home a cross by Alan and then finished off a counter-attack on the stroke of half-time. Timor-Leste won their first international match against Cambodia in which they scored 5–1.

He made his hat-trick against Brunei in the 2014 AFF Suzuki Cup group stages and honoured as the "Southeast Asia Player of the Week" by Goal.com and Goal Indonesia's CEO Eric Noveanto said that, "The Brazilian-born striker was an important figure for Timor Leste in AFF Suzuki Cup 2014 qualification round on Sunday as he successfully netted a hat-trick to clinch a 4–2 thrilling victory over Brunei at New National Stadium Laos."

He appeared in a total of 8 matches for the O Sol Nascente between 2012 and 2015 and scored 6 goals.

== Career statistics ==
=== International goals ===
Scores and results list Timor-Leste's goal tally first.

#	Date	Venue	Opponent	Score	Result	Competition
1.	5 October 2012	Thuwunna Stadium, Yangon	Cambodia	1–0	5–1	2012 AFF Suzuki Cup qualifier
2.	5 October 2012	Thuwunna Stadium, Yangon	Cambodia	2–0	5–1	2012 AFF Suzuki Cup qualifier
3.	9 October 2012	Thuwunna Stadium, Yangon	Laos	1–0	3–1	2012 AFF Suzuki Cup qualifier
4.	12 October 2014	New Laos National Stadium, Vientiane	Brunei	1–0	4–2	2014 AFF Suzuki Cup qualifier
5.	12 October 2014	New Laos National Stadium, Vientiane	Brunei	2–2	4–2	2014 AFF Suzuki Cup qualifier
6.	12 October 2014	New Laos National Stadium, Vientiane	Brunei	3–2	4–2	2014 AFF Suzuki Cup qualifier
