= Ruy Arianto =

Indonesian footballer (born 2004)

Personal information
- Full name: Ruy Arianto
- Date of birth: 7 July 2004 (age 22)
- Place of birth: Surabaya, Indonesia
- Height: 1.65 m (5 ft 5 in)
- Position: Left winger

Team information
- Current team: Persela Lamongan
- Number: 17

Youth career
- 2019–: Persebaya Surabaya

Senior career*
Years	Team	Apps	(Gls)
2021–2024	Persebaya Surabaya	1	(0)
2025–2026	RANS Nusantara	12	(1)
2026–	Persela Lamongan	0	(0)

International career^{‡}
2019–2020	Indonesia U16	9	(5)
Medal record
Men's football
Representing Indonesia
AFF U-16 Youth Championship
Third place	2019 Thailand
- * Club domestic league appearances and goals as of 8 February 2026 ‡ National team caps and goals as of 19 August 2019

Ruy Arianto (born 7 July 2004) is an Indonesian professional footballer who plays as a winger for Championship club Persela Lamongan.

== Club career ==
=== Persebaya Surabaya ===
He was signed for Persebaya Surabaya to play in Liga 1 in the 2021 season. Ruy made his first-team debut on 6 February 2022 in a match against Persipura Jayapura at the Ngurah Rai Stadium, Denpasar.

== Career statistics ==
=== Club ===
As of 8 February 2026

Club	Season	League			Cup		Other		Total	
Club	Season	Division	Apps	Goals	Apps	Goals	Apps	Goals	Apps	Goals
Persebaya Surabaya	2021	Liga 1	1	0	0	0	0	0	1	0
Persebaya Surabaya	2022–23	Liga 1	0	0	0	0	0	0	0	0
RANS Nusantara	2025–26	Liga Nusantara	12	1	0	0	0	0	12	1
Career total			13	1	0	0	0	0	13	1

== Honours ==
=== Club ===
RANS Nusantara

- Liga Nusantara: 2025–26

=== International ===
Indonesia U-16

- AFF U-16 Youth Championship third place: 2019
