= Fernando Alcântara =

Brazilian association football manager

Personal information
- Full name: Fernando Rogério de Alcântara
- Date of birth: 1 January 1966 (age 60)
- Place of birth: Brazil

Managerial career
- Years: Team
- 1994–1995: Nacional-SP (youth)
- 1998: Taubaté (youth)
- 2001: Coslada (youth)
- 2002: Portuguesa (youth)
- 2003: Prudentópolis (assistant)
- 2004: Águia
- 2004–2005: Al-Nassr (youth)
- 2007: Figueirense (assistant)
- 2007: Botafogo (assistant)
- 2008: Taubaté (youth)
- 2008: Figueirense (assistant)
- 2009: Portuguesa (assistant)
- 2009: Pouso Alegre
- 2010: Olé Brasil
- 2011: Paulista
- 2012–2013: Gamba Osaka (assistant)
- 2014: Salgueiro
- 2014–2015: Conquista FC
- 2015: Ceará (youth)
- 2015–2016: Timor-Leste
- 2018: Paranavaí
- 2018–2019: Vitória das Tabocas

Fernando Rogério de Alcântara (born 1 January 1966) is a Brazilian football manager who is a coach for American youth club Phoenix Brazas SC.

== Career ==
Alcantara started his managerial career with Salgueiro Atlético Clube. In 2015, he was appointed head coach of the Timor-Leste national football team, a position he held until 2016. After that, he coached Atlético Clube Paranavaí and Associação Acadêmica e Desportiva Vitória das Tabocas.
