= Kubba Sportswear =

Singaporean sportswear brand

Kubba
- Company type: Private Limited company
- Traded as: Kubba
- Industry: Accessories, Equipment
- Founder: Ricky B. Swen Jr
- Headquarters: Swen Labels International Pte. Ltd.: 1. Fullerton Road, #02-01. One Fullerton, Singapore 049213
- Area served: Worldwide
- Key people: Ricky B. Swen Jr (Chairman); Koh EE Lyn Carina (Secretary) Ria Domingulano (Director); Sidiki M. Sumaoro (Director); Ivan Dragicevic (Director)
- Products: Footwear, sportswear, sports equipment
- Website: www.kubbasportswear.com

Kubba Sportswear is a Singapore sportswear brand founded in 2006. The headquarters are located at Swen Labels International Pte. Ltd. located at One Fullerton, Singapore. The company designs and manufactures shoes, clothing and accessories. It also supplies police and military uniforms and tactical boots and gears as well.

== Sponsorships ==
Kubba is a sponsor of international football brands across the world. The company sponsors both football and volleyball teams.

=== Former sponsored teams ===
==== National teams ====
===== Africa =====
- Burkina Faso
- Ghana
- Kenya
- Liberia
- Libya
- Nigeria
- Sudan
- Zambia

===== Asia =====
- Iran
- Iraq
- Myanmar
- Oman
- Timor-Leste

=== Current sponsored teams ===
==== Football clubs ====
Africa

- LPRC Oilers
- Asante Kotoko SC (2014)
- Berekum Chelsea F.C. (2010)

Asia

- Perlis FA (2012)
- Kuala Muda Naza FC (2009)

Europe

- FK Jagodina (2013)
