= João Panji =

East Timorese footballer

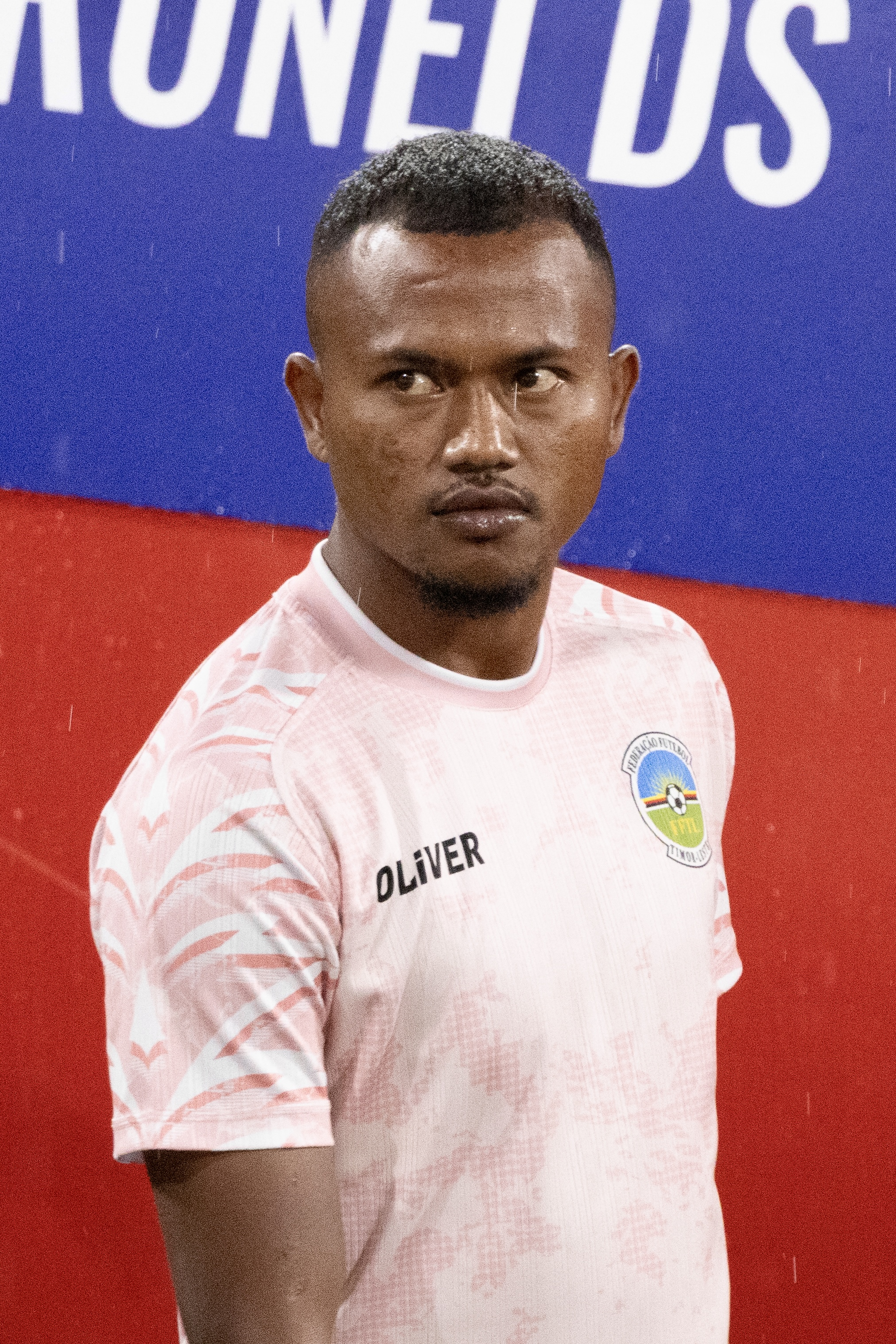
- João with East Timor in 2024

Personal information
- Full name: João Panji dos Santos Soares
- Date of birth: 29 October 2000 (age 26)
- Place of birth: Dili, East Timor
- Height: 1.70 m (5 ft 7 in)
- Position: Centre-back

Team information
- Current team: Assalam

Senior career*
Years	Team	Apps	(Gls)
2017–	Assalam		

International career^{‡}
2017–	East Timor	12	(0)
- * Club domestic league appearances and goals ‡ National team caps and goals as of 10 September 2024

João Panji dos Santos Soares (born 29 October 2000) is a Timorese footballer who currently plays as a centre-back for Liga Futebol Amadora Primeira Divisão club Assalam and the Timor-Leste national team.

== Career statistics ==
=== International ===
As of matches played 10 September 2024

National team	Year	Apps	Goals
East Timor	2017	2	0
East Timor	2019	2	0
East Timor	2021	4	0
East Timor	2022	2	0
East Timor	2024	2	0
Total		12	0
