= Emerson Alcântara =

Brazilian footballer and manager (born 1970)

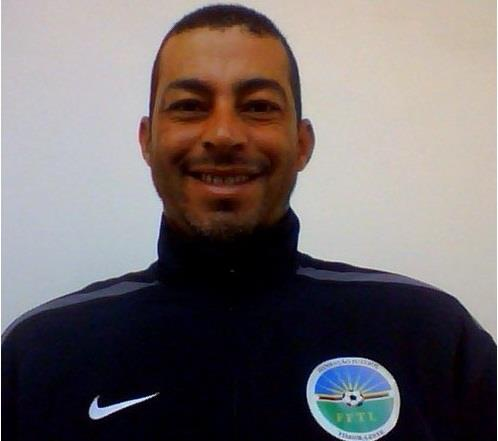
- Alcântara in 2012 as the manager of Timor Leste

Personal information
- Full name: Emerson Ricardo Alcântara
- Date of birth: 27 August 1970 (age 56)
- Place of birth: Cândido Mota, Brazil
- Height: 1.78 m (5 ft 10 in)
- Positions: Defender; defensive midfielder

Senior career*
Years	Team	Apps	(Gls)
1991	Paraguaçuense	5	(0)
1992–1993	Criciúma	10	(1)
1995–1996	Belenenses	20	(3)
Total		35	(4)

Managerial career
- Estrela
- Paulista de Caieiras
- São Bento U20
- Jaboticabal
- 2005: Ipanema
- 2006: CRB U20
- 2008: Penapolense
- 2009: CAL Bariri
- 2009: Velo Clube
- 2009: XV de Piracicaba
- 2010: Olímpia
- 2010: Batatais
- 2010: Amparo
- 2011: Osvaldo Cruz
- 2011: Tupã
- 2011–2012: North East Stars
- 2012–2013: Timor Leste
- 2013: Timor Leste U23
- 2014–2016: Yangon United
- 2018–2019: Lonestar Kashmir
- 2020–2021: Punjab FC
- 2021: Penapolense
- 2022: Burgan SC
- 2022–2023: Vanuatu U17
- 2022: Vanuatu U23
- 2023–2024: Vanuatu
Medal record
Men's football
Representing Vanuatu (as manager)
MSG Prime Minister's Cup
Third place	2023 New Caledonia
- * Club domestic league appearances and goals

Emerson Ricardo Alcântara (born 27 August 1970 in Cândido Mota) is a Brazilian football manager and a former defender and defensive midfielder for C.F. Os Belenenses. He is the former manager of North East Stars of Trinidad and Tobago, and he was most recently the manager of Vanuatu.

== Playing career ==
Emerson Alcântara started his career in 1991 with Esporte Clube Paraguaçuense in São Paulo before moving the year after to play for Brazilian second division side Criciúma Esporte Clube, who had the previous year won the Copa Do Brasil.

He then ended his playing career with one of Portugal’s oldest club C.F. Os Belenenses in 1996.

== Coaching career ==
Emerson Alcântara began his coaching career in 2005 with a small club, Ipanema Atlético Clube, which is based in the Alagoas state before moving to XV de Piracicaba, a club playing in the São Paulo state championship. In 2009, they finished fourth in the regional league.

Prior to his arrival to take up the coaching position in Timor Leste, Emerson Alcântara had coached North East Stars in Trinidad and Tobago.

Emerson Alcântara joined Lonestar Kashmir as a manager in 2018. He was then the caretaker manager of the Vanuatu national team between 2023 and 2024.

== Honours ==
=== Manager ===
Vanuatu

- MSG Prime Minister's Cup: 3rd place, 2023
