= Sebastián Gómez =

Sebastián Gómez may refer to:

- Sebastián Gómez (Andorran footballer) (born 1983), Andorran football winger
- Sebastián Gómez (Colombian footballer) (born 1996), Colombian football midfielder
- Sebastian Gomez (soccer, born 2006), American soccer player
