= Gali Freitas =

Timorese footballer

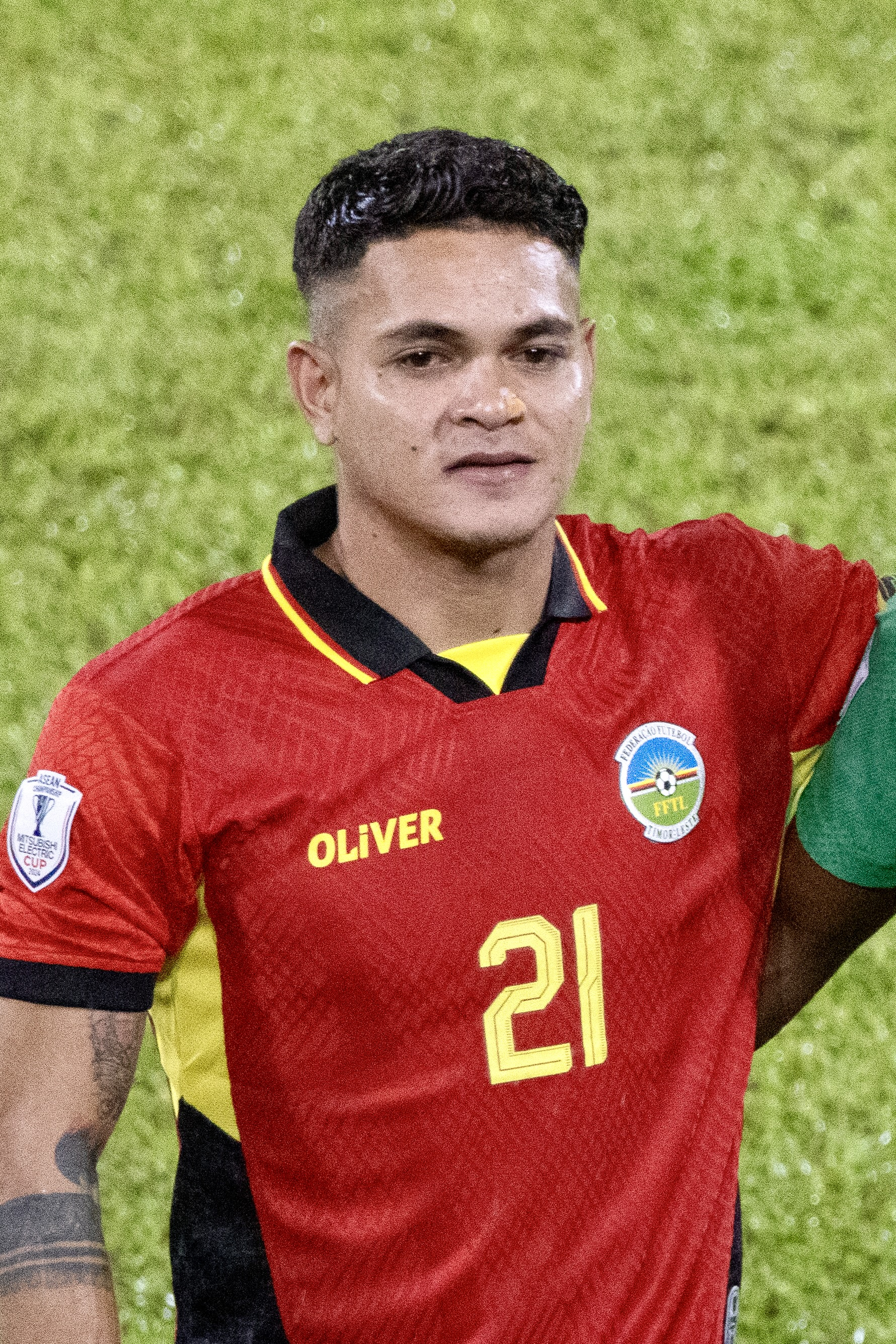
- Freitas playing for Timor-Leste in 2024

Personal information
- Full name: Paulo Domingos Gali da Costa Freitas
- Date of birth: 31 December 2004 (age 21)
- Place of birth: Dili, Timor Leste
- Height: 1.65 m (5 ft 5 in)
- Position: Winger

Team information
- Current team: Madura United (on loan from Persebaya Surabaya)
- Number: 21

Youth career
- 2010–2017: Timor-Leste Youth Training Center Dili

Senior career*
Years	Team	Apps	(Gls)
2018	SLB Laulara		
2019–2022	Lalenok United		
2022–2023	Assalam		
2023	Karketu Dili		
2023–2025	PSIS Semarang	61	(12)
2025–	Persebaya Surabaya	29	(6)
2026–	→ Madura United (loan)	1	(0)

International career^{‡}
2017–2019	Timor-Leste U16	9	(11)
2017–2019	Timor-Leste U19	4	(2)
2021–	Timor-Leste U23	9	(4)
2018–	Timor-Leste	17	(3)
- * Club domestic league appearances and goals as of 6 September 2026 ‡ National team caps and goals as of 31 March 2026

Paulo Domingos Gali da Costa Freitas (born 31 December 2004) is a Timorese professional footballer who plays as a winger for Super League club Madura United, on loan from Persebaya Surabaya and the Timor-Leste national team. Nicknamed The Eternal Wonderkid, he is a player with the longest youth career, debuting for the national team at the age of 13.

== Club career ==
On 2 June 2023, Gali joined Indonesian club PSIS Semarang, signing a one season contract. On 3 July 2023, he scored a goal in his debut against Bhayangkara at the Jatidiri Stadium, Semarang.

On 12 February 2024, his contract was extended for two seasons, until 2026.

== International career ==
On 1 September 2018, Gali made his debut for the senior team in a 2018 AFF Championship qualification game against Brunei in the first-leg in a 3–1 win. On 27 January 2022, Gali scored his debut goal for the senior team in a friendly match against Indonesia.

== Controversy ==
In 2019 Timor Leste's under 15 team for the 2019 AFF U-15 Championship were accused of fielding overage players at the tournament, with team captain Gali Freitas being one of the prominent players accused of being over age with claims that he was at least 22 years old at the time. These protests led to a formal investigation by the ASEAN Football Federation into the incident. The protests however were later dismissed with Gali being deemed to be eligible to participate in the tournament.

== Career statistics ==
=== Club ===
As of match played 6 September 2026

Appearances and goals by club, season and competition
Club	Season	League			Cup		Continental		Other		Total	
Club	Season	Division	Apps	Goals	Apps	Goals	Apps	Goals	Apps	Goals	Apps	Goals
PSIS Semarang	2023–24	Liga 1	32	11	–		–		0	0	32	11
PSIS Semarang	2024–25	Liga 1	29	1	–		–		0	0	29	1
Persebaya Surabaya	2025–26	Super League	29	6	0	0	–		0	0	29	6
Madura United (loan)	2026–27	Super League	1	0	0	0	–		0	0	1	0
Career total			91	18	0	0	0	0	0	0	91	18

=== International ===
As of 31 March 2026

Appearances and goals by national team and year
Timor-Leste national team
Year	Apps	Goals
2018	3	0
2019	0	0
2020	0	0
2021	4	0
2022	3	1
2023	0	0
2024	3	1
2025	3	1
2026	1	0
Total	17	3

Scores and results list Timor Leste's goal tally first, score column indicates score after each Freitas goal.

International senior goals

As of match played 14 October 2025

List of international goals scored by Gali Freitas
No.	Date	Venue	Opponent	Score	Result	Competition
1.	27 January 2022	Kapten I Wayan Dipta Stadium, Gianyar Regency, Indonesia	Indonesia	1–0	1–4	Friendly
2.	8 October 2024	Hassanal Bolkiah National Stadium, Bandar Seri Begawan, Brunei	Brunei	1–0	1–0	2024 ASEAN Championship qualification
3.	9 October 2025	Territory Rugby League Stadium, Darwin, Australia	Philippines	1–2	1–4	2027 AFC Asian Cup qualification

== Honours ==
Lalenok United

- Copa FFTL: 2020

Individual

- AFF U-16 Youth Championship top scorer: 2019 (7 goals)
