= Fábio Magrão =

Brazilian footballer and coach (born 1977)

Personal information
- Full name: Fábio Joaquim Maciel da Silva
- Date of birth: 29 October 1977 (age 49)
- Place of birth: Ouro Fino, Minas Gerais, Brazil
- Height: 1.88 m (6 ft 2 in)
- Position: Midfielder

Senior career*
Years	Team	Apps	(Gls)
1995–1998	Flamengo	2	(0)
1999	CSA		
2000	Joinville		
2000	Juventude	3	(0)
2001	CSA		
- Al Khaleej
- Al Arabi
2007–2008	Zob Ahan	18	(0)
- Emirates
2009–2010	Shatin	6	(0)
2010	Bangkok Glass		
2011	Sisaket		

Managerial career
- 2015: Timor-Leste
- 2015: Timor-Leste U-23
- 2015–2016: Dibba Al-Hisn Sports Club
- 2016: Timor-Leste
- 2017–2018: Kuala Lumpur FA
- 2020–2021: Timor-Leste (technical director)
- 2021–2022: Timor-Leste
- 2021–2022: Timor-Leste U-23
- 2025–: Brunei (technical director)
- 2025–2026: Brunei
- * Club domestic league appearances and goals

Fábio Joaquim Maciel da Silva (born 29 October 1977), known as Fábio Magrão, is a Brazilian football coach and former player. Previously, he was the head coach of Kuala Lumpur FA. He also had a successful career as a player, playing for Flamengo, one of the greatest teams in Brazil, and in the United Arab Emirates.

Fábio replaced his compatriot Wanderley Junior as Kuala Lumpur's head coach in the middle of the 2017 Malaysia Premier League season and succeeded on winning 12 of his 14 games, taking Kuala Lumpur FA from eighth to first place and winning promotion. On 11 October 2017, he extended his contract with Kuala Lumpur for another year. In the 2018 Malaysia Super League, he successfully avoided relegation.

Fábio became Timor-Leste senior and under-23 coach for the third time in 2021. His highest achievement for the national team was taking the under-23 team to third place in the 2022 AFF U-23 Championship.

In January 2025, Fábio was unveiled as the new technical director of the Brunei national football team. After the departure of Vinícius Eutrópio a month later, he was given the reins of the team starting from the 2027 AFC Asian Cup qualification fixture against Lebanon in March.
