= Manuel da Costa Soares =

East Timorese professional football manager

Personal information
- Place of birth: East Timor

Managerial career
- Years: Team
- 2009: Timor-Leste
- 2015: Timor-Leste

Manuel da Costa Soares is an East Timorese professional football manager. He had coached Timor-Leste national football team in two stints; in 2009 and in 2015.
