= Pedro Correia de Almeida =

East Timorese football manager

Personal information
- Place of birth: East Timor

Managerial career
- Years: Team
- 2007–2008: Timor-Leste
- 2010: Timor-Leste

Pedro Correia de Almeida is an East Timorese football coach. From 2007 to 2008 and on November 21, 2010 in a friendly match against Indonesia, he led the Timor-Leste national football team.
