= Antonio Carlos Vieira =

Brazilian footballer and manager (born 1956)

Personal information
- Date of birth: 7 February 1956 (age 70)
- Place of birth: Brazil

Senior career*
Years	Team	Apps	(Gls)
1983–1985	Oriente Petrolero		
1985–1987	Sol de América		
1987	Cascavel FC		
1988	Toledo FC		
1988	Palestino		

Managerial career
- 1990: Juventus (Ecuador)
- 1992, 1994–1995: Estudiantes de Mérida
- 1996 1997 AtleticoTorino: Botafogo
- 1999: Águila
- 2001, 2004: Panama
- 2002: Dragón
- 2003: Juventus (Belize)
- 2006–2007: Belize
- 2008: Portuguesa F.C.
- 2008: Real Maryland Monarchs
- 2009: Floriana F.C.
- 2011–2012: Timor Leste
- 2012–2013: Phoenix Monsoon
- 2014: Timor Leste
- * Club domestic league appearances and goals

Antonio Carlos Vieira (born 7 February 1956) is a former Brazilian football player and manager.
