= Timor-Leste national football team =

Timor-Leste
- Nickname(s): Lafaek (The Crocodiles); O Sol Nascente (The Rising Sun)
- Association: Federação de Futebol de Timor-Leste (FFTL)
- Confederation: AFC (Asia)
- Sub-confederation: AFF (Southeast Asia)
- Head coach: Zé Pedro
- Captain: Gali Freitas
- Most caps: Anggisu Barbosa (30)
- Top scorer: João Pedro (9)
- Home stadium: Municipal Stadium of Dili
- FIFA code: TLS
First colours	Second colours

FIFA ranking
- Current: 202 ▼1 (7 October 2026)
- Highest: 146 (June 2015)
- Lowest: 206 (October 2012)

First international
- Sri Lanka 3–2 Timor-Leste (Colombo, Sri Lanka; 21 March 2003)

Biggest win
- Cambodia 1–5 Timor-Leste (Yangon, Myanmar; 5 October 2012)

Biggest defeat
- Timor-Leste 0–10 Saudi Arabia (Dili, Timor Leste; 17 November 2015); Timor-Leste 0–10 Thailand (Hanoi, Vietnam; 8 December 2024)

AFC Solidarity Cup
- Appearances: 1 (first in 2016)
- Best result: Group stage (2016)

ASEAN Championship
- Appearances: 5 (first in 2004)
- Best result: Group stage (2004, 2018, 2020, 2024, 2026)

ASEAN Challenge Cup
- Appearances: 1 (first in 2026)
- Best result: Group stage (2026)

The Timor-Leste national football team (Portuguese: Seleção Timorense de Futebol) represents Timor-Leste in the senior men's international football. It is organised by the Federação de Futebol de Timor-Leste (FFTL) which is affiliated with the Asian Football Confederation (AFC) and the regional ASEAN Football Federation (AFF). They became a member of FIFA on 12 September 2005. The team's traditional home kit is primarily faded red, often paired with black shorts and sometimes accented with yellow trim. Timor-Leste are colloquially known as "Lafaek" also known as 'The Crocodiles', an animal of prominent symbolic nature to the country.

Timor-Leste's international debut was in the preliminary round of the 2004 AFC Asian Cup qualification in March 2003, when they lost 3–2 to Sri Lanka and 3–0 to Chinese Taipei. Timor-Leste won their first international match on 5 October 2012 against Cambodia with a score of 5–1.

== History ==
=== Early history (2003–2017) ===
Football was established in East Timor during the Portuguese colonial era, when many of the locals and the Portuguese officials played amateur football. After Portugal ended its colonial rule, Indonesia invaded and occupied the island, which resulted in a long running battle against Jakarta-led forces. Timor-Leste eventually gained independence from Indonesia in 2002.

The East Timor Football Federation was accepted as an associate member of AFC at the 20th AFC Congress in 2002. Their international debut came in March 2003 when they participated in the 2004 AFC Asian Cup qualification campaign for the 2004 AFC Asian Cup in China. Given their history, it was no surprise that they crashed out with defeats against the likes of Sri Lanka and Chinese Taipei. They then entered the regional competition for the first time in 2004 as they played in the 2004 AFF Championship as an invited member. They finished in last place, showing that they had a long way to go before they could compete even on the regional stage.

They again had no success in the 2007 AFF Championship qualification, with four heavy losses, including a 7–0 trouncing by the Philippines. The following year in the 2008 AFF Championship qualification, Timor-Leste surprisingly drew against Cambodia; this feat was reported in international news.

==== First win ====
In the 2012 AFF Championship qualification, the country's football federation (FFTL) reportedly selected their foreign based players, who played in Brazil, Portugal, Australia and elsewhere, to fortify the team as they also did at the 2011 SEA Games.

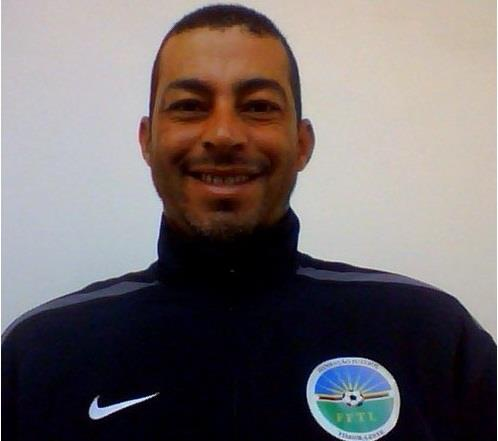
Emerson Alcântara lead East Timor to a 5–1 victory over Cambodia in their first-ever win in 2012.

On 5 October 2012, Timor-Leste won their first international match in a 5–1 victory against Cambodia with goals coming from Murilo de Almeida who scored a brace, Adelino Trindade and Alan Leandro. On 9 October 2012, the team won another match against Laos in the qualification round as Murilo de Almeida scored a penalty at 43' minutes of the first half of the match. Later Adelino Trindade extended the Timorese advantage with a header early in the second half and then Alan Leandro added the third goal on the 83rd minute. After winning the second match against Laos, head coach Emerson Alcântara stated "This is a win for the people of East Timor. They had to wait a long time for our team to win their first match in this competition but now we have two wins and this was an important victory for Timor-Leste. "I think that about 70 percent of people in Timor Leste are poor so it is very important to get this result for them because they love football and the people can get confidence and take pride in this result. It is very important for us to motivate our people and to help to change their lives." With a win needed in the final fixture, Timor-Leste subsequently lost to Brunei 2–1 and finished in third place in the group, one point away from runners-up of the group, Laos as they went on to qualify for the 2012 AFF Championship. In the 2014 AFF Championship qualification, Timor-Leste secured a victory against Brunei winning them 4–2 in the process. In the next match, they caused an upset to Myanmar on 14 October 2014 which ended up in a goalless draw but that wasn't enough as Timor-Leste didn't make it to the 2014 AFF Championship.

==== 2018 FIFA World Cup qualification – AFC second round ====
Timor-Leste then participated in the 2018 FIFA World Cup qualification first round facing Mongolia where on 12 March 2015, they secured their first ever win against a country outside of Southeast Asia in a 4–1 win at the National Stadium of Timor-Leste. In the second leg, Timor-Leste travelled to Ulaanbaatar where they won 1–0 putting them on an aggregate of 5–2 seeing them advancing to the second round however on 12 December 2017, FIFA awarded both matches 3–0 to Mongolia due to Timor-Leste fielding numerous ineligible players. However, this was long after the Second round had been played, so Timor-Leste advanced and Mongolia were not reinstated. Timor-Leste were then grouped with Saudi Arabia, United Arab Emirates, Palestine and Malaysia in Group A. On 11 June 2015, Ramon Saro scored in the 90+3' minute stoppage time which cause a huge upsets to Malaysia in a 1–1 draw at the Bukit Jalil National Stadium which Timor-Leste got their first ever point in the campaign. On 8 October 2015 while playing at home, Ramon Saro break the deadlock as they lead against Palestine however in the dying minute of the match, Ahmad Abu Nahyeh equalise for Palestine in 1–1 draw as it gains media attention from the Southeast Asia region. However, Timor-Leste has to forfeited five of their group matches due to fielding numerous ineligible players. Since their last match against Saudi Arabia on 17 November 2015, Timor-Leste has been playing their home match overboard as their National Stadium of Timor-Leste in Dili failed to meet FIFA standards which also see them finishing at the bottom of the table. During the 2019 AFC Asian Cup qualification match, Timor-Leste played their home match at the Tan Sri Dato Haji Hassan Yunos Stadium in Johor Bahru playing against Malaysia.

Timor-Leste then participated in the 2016 AFC Solidarity Cup held in Kuching where they snatched a goalless draw against Nepal. They were also invited to the 2017 CTFA International Tournament where in the match against the Philippines, Silveiro Garcia scored the only goal in the match as Timor-Leste gains a win in the tournament.

=== Back-to-back AFF Championships (2018–2020) ===
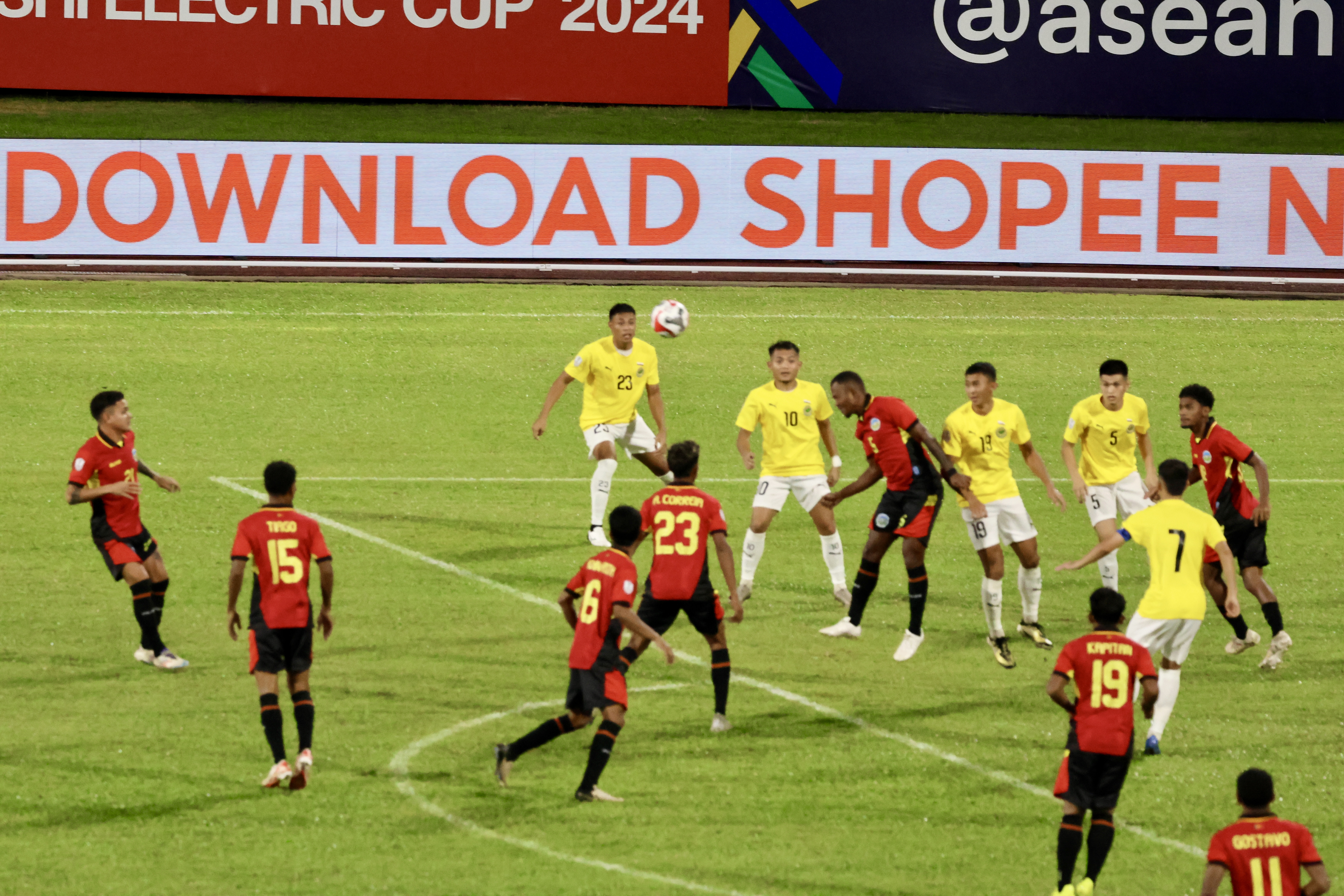
Timor Leste playing against regional rivals, Brunei during the 2024 ASEAN Championship qualification.

Timor-Leste then qualified to the 2018 AFF Championship for the first time in 14 years winning the 2018 AFF Championship qualification against Brunei on an aggregate of 3–2. They will play their designated "home" match against Thailand at the Rajamangala Stadium in Bangkok, while their home tie against the Philippines will be played at the Kuala Lumpur Stadium in Malaysia due to the incomplete floodlighting of the National Stadium of Timor-Leste. Timor-Leste then qualified for the 2020 AFF Championship automatically after the withdrawal of Brunei in the qualification play-off.

=== Young star in the making (2021–present) ===
During the 2027 AFC Asian Cup qualification – play-off round first leg match on 5 September 2024, João Pedro became the first player in Timorese history to score a hat-trick in a 4–1 win over Mongolia while playing on neutral ground at the Kapten I Wayan Dipta Stadium held in Gianyar, Bali. In October 2024, Timor Leste then played against Brunei who is also on a five-game winning streak for the 2024 ASEAN Championship qualification. Timor Leste ended up victorious winning 1–0 on aggregate where Gali Freitas scored the goal to ensure the team qualified for the 2024 ASEAN Championship, where they will play their matches at Hàng Đẫy Stadium in Hanoi.

==== 2024 ASEAN Championship ====
As of 28 December 2024, Timor-Leste's performance at the 2024 ASEAN Championship has been poor, ending in a string of defeats that resulted in their early elimination. The squad competed in four matches, beginning with a devastating loss to Thailand on 8 December suffering their worst ever defeat since 2015 with a 10–0 thrasing defeat scoreline. Following that, they met Malaysia on 11 December, putting up a valiant battle but ultimately lost 2–3. Their difficulties continued against Singapore on 14 December with a 0–3 defeat. Timor-Leste met Cambodia in their last group stage match on 17 December and fell to a 1–2 defeat.

Timor-Leste finished with a record of four losses, two goals scored, and an incredible eighteen goals conceded, resulting in a goal differential of -16. They were unable to gain any victories during the tournament. They became the first team to be eliminated from the 2024 ASEAN Championship.

During the third round of 2027 AFC Asian Cup qualification on 10 June 2025, João Pedro scored the lone goal in a 1–0 win against Maldives which put him to become the all time top scorer for Timor-Leste.

== Eligibility of players controversy ==
Since 2012, several Brazilian-born footballers, who are not of East Timorese descent and had not necessarily played in the East Timorese League, were expressly naturalised.

The country's recent history of naturalising foreign players such as Murilo de Almeida, Fellipe Bertoldo, Diogo Rangel, Rodrigo Silva, Jairo Neto, Ramon Saro, Alan Leandro, Thiago Cunha, Juninho and Heberty has been criticized by many, including native East Timorese players and fans.

In a match on 8 October 2015 against Palestine seven of the starting eleven for the Timorese line-up were naturalized Brazilians. Following the match the Palestinian Football Association made a complaint to FIFA stating that the naturalized Timorese players were not eligible to represent Timor-Leste under FIFA rules.

Following a concern from some Timorese who complained to the prime minister, the prosecutor general and the minister for justice regarding the naturalisation program, Timor Leste Football Federation (FFTL) decided to drop their overseas-born legion. It meant Timor-Leste would be without seven naturalised Brazilian players for the 2018 FIFA World Cup and 2019 AFC Asian Cup joint qualifiers match against United Arab Emirates on 12 November 2015. In that match, coach Fernando Alcântara played an all national line up including six who were under twenty, including Ervino Soares who was 16. Timor-Leste ended up losing the match 8–0. Alcântara took responsibility for the defeat although he also added that he had been forced to play such an inexperienced line-up by the FFTL.

The next match, Timor-Leste did even worse, suffering a record 0–10 home defeat to a strong Saudi Arabia side, who eventually qualified for the 2018 FIFA World Cup in Russia.

Jesse Pinto, an Australian-Timorese footballer, told reporters that the FFTL gives Brazilian players Timorese passports so that they can be registered as "Asian" players and meet the quotas of teams. Pinto also added that the FFTL often takes advantage of players from poor backgrounds, but that it often did not meet its promises of allowing players to travel back to Brazil to meet their families.

In December 2016, the FFTL was charged with using forged and falsified documents, fielding ineligible players and bringing the game into disrepute.

A decision was made on 20 January 2017 that Timor-Leste is barred from participating in the qualification tournament for the 2023 AFC Asian Cup after being found to have fielded a total of twelve ineligible players in 2019 AFC Asian Cup qualification matches and among other competitions.

== Team image ==
=== Kit manufacturers ===
Period	Manufacturer
2008–2010	(Japan) Tiger
2012	(United States) Nike
2013–2014	(United Kingdom) Mitre
2015–2017	(Singapore) Kubba Sportswear
2018–2024	(Indonesia) Narrow
2024–2026	(Indonesia) Oliver Sports
2026–present	(Brazil) Volt Sport

The team's kit manufacturer was Kubba Sportswear from June 2014 to February 2017.

Since 2018, the kits are made by Narrow, an Indonesian apparel. The home kit is red shirts, black shorts, and red socks, with black as a secondary color. The away kit all white. From 2008 to 2010, their away kits were yellow but at 2010 AFF Suzuki Cup qualification, the away kits changed back into all whites. Their kits were made by Nike in 2012. Previous kit makers include Mitre, Joma, Nike and Tiger.

=== Home stadium ===
Timor Leste's home ground is the National Stadium of Timor-Leste in Dili. The stadium capacity is 5,000. The first official match played in the stadium was a 2018 FIFA World Cup qualification match against Mongolia on 12 March 2015. Timor-Leste played their last match at the National Stadium of Timor-Leste against Saudi Arabia on 17 November 2015 and since then, they have used neutral grounds all over Southeast Asia as their home ground.

Timor Leste national football team home stadiums
Image	Stadium	Capacity	Location	Last match
	National Stadium of Timor-Leste	5,000	Dili	v Saudi Arabia (17 November 2015; 2018 FIFA World Cup qualification)

=== Neutral venue ===
List of neutral venue grounds for Timor-Leste in the FIFA World Cup qualifications, AFC Asian Cup qualifications and AFF Championship qualifications since 2020.

Timor Leste neutral home stadiums
Image	Stadium	Capacity	Location	Last match
	Chonburi Stadium	8,680	Mueang Chonburi, Chonburi Province, Thailand.	v Indonesia (31 July 2026; 2026 ASEAN Championship)
	Territory Rugby League Stadium	10,000	Darwin, Northern Territory, Australia	v Maldives (10 June 2025; 2027 AFC Asian Cup qualification – third round)
	Hàng Đẫy Stadium	22,500	Hanoi, Vietnam	v Singapore (14 December 2024; 2024 ASEAN Championship)
	Kapten I Wayan Dipta Stadium	18,000	Gianyar Regency, Bali, Indonesia	v Mongolia (5 September 2024; 2027 AFC Asian Cup qualification – play-off round)
	Kaohsiung National Stadium	55,000	Zuoying, Kaohsiung, Taiwan	v Chinese Taipei (17 October 2023; 2026 FIFA World Cup qualification)
	Track & Field Sports Complex	1,700	Bandar Seri Begawan, Brunei	v Brunei (8 November 2022; 2022 AFF Championship qualification)

== Results and fixtures ==
The following is a list of match results in the last 12 months, as well as any future matches that have been scheduled.

Win Draw Loss Fixture

=== 2026 ===
31 March 2027 AFC Asian Cup qualification	Maldives	2–1	Timor-Leste	Malé, Maldives
15:30 UTC+5:30	Irufaan 89'; Fasir 90+4' (pen.)	Report; Report (AFC)	Bakhito 67'	Stadium: National Football Stadium; Attendance: 500; Referee: Razlan Joffri Ali (Malaysia)

2 June 2026 ASEAN Championship qualification	Brunei	0–3	Timor-Leste	Bandar Seri Begawan, Brunei
20:15 UTC+8		Report	Rangel 27'; Zenivio 43' (pen.); Oatnasio 90+2'	Stadium: Hassanal Bolkiah National Stadium; Attendance: 2,186; Referee: Ahmad A'Qashah (Singapore)

9 June 2026 ASEAN Championship qualification	Timor-Leste	3–1	Brunei	Kuala Lumpur, Malaysia
17:00 UTC+8	Cruz 55'; Osorio 62'; Oatnasio 80'	Report	Azwan 43'	Stadium: Kuala Lumpur Stadium; Attendance: 250; Referee: Sivakorn Pu-Udom (Thailand)

24 July 2026 ASEAN Championship	Timor-Leste	0–7	Vietnam	Chonburi, Thailand
20:30 UTC+7		Report	Đỗ Hoàng Hên 7', 41'; Nguyễn Đình Bắc 31', 42', 65'; Nguyễn Xuân Son 45+1'; Nguyễn Quang Hải 79'	Stadium: Chonburi Stadium; Referee: Jin Jingyuan (China)

27 July 2026 ASEAN Championship	Singapore	2–0	Timor-Leste	Kallang, Singapore
19:00 UTC+8	Ilhan 41'; Song Ui-young 56'	Report		Stadium: Jalan Besar Stadium; Attendance: 4,665; Referee: Salman Ahmad Falahi (Qatar)

31 July 2026 ASEAN Championship	Timor-Leste	0–3	Indonesia	Chonburi, Thailand
17:00 UTC+7		Report	Pattynama 74'; Haye 78'; Baker 81'	Stadium: Chonburi Stadium; Referee: Choi Hyun-jai (South Korea)

3 August 2026 ASEAN Championship	Cambodia	3–0	Timor-Leste	Phnom Penh, Cambodia
17;30 UTC+7	Soknet 16', 63'; Rado 90'	Report		Stadium: Morodok Techo National Stadium; Referee: Zakaria Ismail (Malaysia)

24 September 2026 FIFA ASEAN Challenge Cup	Myanmar	2–0	Timor-Leste	Kowloon, Hong Kong
20:00 UTC+8				Stadium: Mong Kok Stadium

30 September 2026 FIFA ASEAN Challenge Cup	Timor-Leste	2–2	Cambodia	Kowloon, Hong Kong
17:00 UTC+8	João Pedro 17'; Bakhito 58'	FIFA Report; GSA Report	Nieto 28', 38' (pen.)	Stadium: Kai Tak Stadium; Referee: Torphong Somsing (Thailand)

== Coaching staff ==
Position	Name
Technical director	(Timor-Leste) Paulo Mesquita
Head coach	(Portugal) Zé Pedro
Assistant coach	(Portugal) Jaime Coelho (Timor-Leste) Miro Baldo Bento
Goalkeeping coach	(Timor-Leste) Derson Gusmão
Physiotherapist	(Timor-Leste) Adou Costa
Media Officer	(Timor-Leste) Mario Filipe Belo
Administrator	(Timor-Leste) Hasan Cesario
Official	(Timor-Leste) Adou Marques
Kitman	(Timor-Leste) Fablo Freitas

=== Coaching history ===
As of May 2024

Manager	Period	Internationals				
Manager	Period	G	W	D	L	%
(Portugal) José Luís	2004–2006	10	0	0	10	0.0
(Timor-Leste) João Paulo Pereira	2007	2	0	0	2	0.0
(Timor-Leste) Pedro Correia de Almeida	2007–2008	5	0	1	4	0.0
(Brazil) Clodoaldo	2010	3	0	0	3	0.0
(Brazil) Antonio Carlos Vieira	2011–2012	6	1	1	4	16.7
(Brazil) Emerson Alcântara	2012–2014	4	2	0	2	50.0
(Timor-Leste) Manuel da Costa Soares	2015	1	1	0	0	100.0
(Brazil) Fábio Magrão	2015–2016	3	0	1	2	0.0
(Brazil) Emerson Alcântara	2015–2016	6	0	1	5	0.0
(Chile) Simón Elissetche	2017–2018	3	1	0	2	33.3
(Japan) Norio Tsukitate	2018–2019	9	1	1	7	11.1
(Portugal) Fabiano Flora	2019–2020	0	0	0	0	—
(Brazil) Fábio Magrão	2021–2022	9	0	1	8	0.0
(Malaysia) Gopalkrishnan Ramasamy	2022–2023	2	1	0	1	50.0
(South Korea) Park Soon-tae	2023	2	0	0	2	0.0
(Chile) Simón Elissetche	2024–2025	2	1	0	1	50.0
(Portugal) José Pedro Alves Salazar	2025–	2	2	0	0	100.0

== Players ==
=== Current squad ===
The following 23 players were called up for the 2026 FIFA ASEAN Challenge Cup.

Caps and goals updated as of 30 September 2026, after the match against Cambodia.

No.	Pos.	Player	Date of birth (age)	Caps	Goals	Club
1	GK	Dylan Niski	1 March 2000 (age 26)	9	0	(Football Australia) Western City Rangers
12	GK	Alexandre Lima	3 November 2005 (age 21)	1	0	(East Timor Football Federation) Santa Cruz
20	GK	Egidio Lurio	5 December 2008 (age 17)	0	0	(East Timor Football Federation) Karketu Dili
2	DF	Jackson Fowler	3 September 2004 (age 22)	7	0	(Football Australia) Valentine
3	DF	Eric Silva	10 July 2002 (age 24)	7	0	(Portuguese Football Federation) Sesimbra
4	DF	Anizo Correia	23 May 2003 (age 23)	26	0	(East Timor Football Federation) AD Santo António
6	DF	João Varudo	6 June 1992 (age 34)	5	0	(Portuguese Football Federation) AD Bobadelense
7	DF	Luís Figo	17 April 2005 (age 21)	17	0	(East Timor Football Federation) AD Santo António
16	DF	Ryan Jom	3 March 2005 (age 21)	10	0	(Football Australia) Canterbury Bankstown
17	DF	Liam Farrugia	13 January 2003 (age 23)	9	0	(Malta Football Association) Naxxar Lions
18	DF	Juvito Moniz	8 December 2003 (age 22)	3	0	(East Timor Football Federation) Santa Cruz
5	MF	Palomito Ribeiro	14 June 2005 (age 21)	5	0	(East Timor Football Federation) AD Santo António
8	MF	Claudio Osorio	26 September 2002 (age 24)	22	1	(Portuguese Football Federation) O Elvas
11	MF	Freteliano	9 August 2004 (age 22)	15	0	(East Timor Football Federation) Santa Cruz
13	MF	Tristan Arrarte	26 July 2008 (age 18)	9	0	(Football Australia) Western Sydney Wanderers
21	MF	Natalino da Costa	3 August 2003 (age 23)	2	0	(East Timor Football Federation) Karketu Dili
9	FW	Olagar Xavier	18 May 2003 (age 23)	20	1	(East Timor Football Federation) AD Santo António
10	FW	João Pedro	24 June 1998 (age 28)	30	9	(Football Association of Malaysia) Kuching City
14	FW	Zion Cruz	18 April 2001 (age 25)	9	1	Free agent
15	FW	Paulo Gusmão	24 August 2003 (age 23)	1	0	(East Timor Football Federation) Santa Cruz
19	FW	Alexandro Bakhito	1 June 2006 (age 20)	14	2	(East Timor Football Federation) Karketu Dili
22	FW	Vabio Canavaro	25 January 2007 (age 19)	8	0	(Croatian Football Federation) Kamen Podbablje
23	FW	Oatnasio da Silva	11 June 2006 (age 20)	7	2	(Irish Football Association) Portadown

=== Recent call-ups ===
Pos.	Player	Date of birth (age)	Caps	Goals	Club	Latest call-up
GK	Filonito	16 September 2004 (age 22)	3	0	(Timor-Leste) SLB Laulara	v. Brunei, 9 June 2026
DF	Filomeno Junior	21 June 1998 (age 28)	29	0	(Timor-Leste) SLB Laulara	v. Brunei, 9 June 2026
DF	Nelson Viegas	24 December 1999 (age 26)	29	1	(Timor-Leste) Karketu Dili	v. Maldives, 31 March 2026
DF	Ricardo Bianco	15 January 2006 (age 20)	3	0	(Timor-Leste) Santa Cruz	v. Maldives, 31 March 2026
DF	Jonah Madeira	16 February 2001 (age 25)	1	0	(Australia) Craigieburn City	v. Maldives, 31 March 2026
MF	Tiago	13 April 1999 (age 27)	15	0	(Timor-Leste) Karketu Dili	2026 FIFA ASEAN Cup ^{WD}
MF	Denilson Almeida	15 August 2008 (age 18)	0	0	(Timor-Leste) Coração	2026 ASEAN Championship
MF	Amancio Araujo	26 April 2002 (age 24)	0	0	(Timor-Leste) Santa Cruz	v. Brunei, 9 June 2026
MF	Nilton de Carvalho	1999 (age 27)	1	0	(Timor-Leste) Santa Cruz	v. Maldives, 31 March 2026
FW	Zenivio	22 April 2005 (age 21)	28	2	(Malaysia) UM-Damansara United	2026 FIFA ASEAN Cup ^{WD}
FW	Gali Freitas	31 December 2004 (age 21)	17	3	(Indonesia) Madura United	2026 FIFA ASEAN Cup ^{WD}
FW	João Rangel	17 July 2001 (age 25)	9	2	(England) Leiston	2026 ASEAN Championship
FW	Angenucu Viegas	22 July 2003 (age 23)	1	0	(Timor-Leste) Karketu Dili	2026 ASEAN Championship
FW	Mouzinho	26 February 2002 (age 24)	17	3	(Timor-Leste) SLB Laulara	v. Maldives, 31 March 2026
Notes: ^{INJ} Withdrew due to injury; ^{PRE} Preliminary squad / standby; ^{WD} Withdrew from the squad

=== Previous squads ===
- 2004 AFF Championship squad
- 2016 AFC Solidarity Cup squad
- 2018 AFF Championship squad
- 2020 AFF Championship squad
- 2024 ASEAN Championship squad

== Player records ==
As of 30 September 2026
Players in bold are still active with Timor-Leste.

=== Most appearances ===
Rank	Name	Caps	Goals	Career
1	Anggisu Barbosa	30	4	2008–2016
1	**João Pedro**	30	9	2018–present
2	Adelino Trindade	27	3	2010–2018
3	José Fonseca	26	0	2010–2017
4	Henrique Cruz	25	3	2015–2018
4	**Nelson Viegas**	25	1	2016–present
6	**Filomeno Junior**	24	0	2018–present
8	Nataniel Reis	23	1	2014–2018
9	Eusebio de Almeida	22	0	2007–2015
9	Rufino Gama	22	7	2016–2022

=== Top goalscorers ===
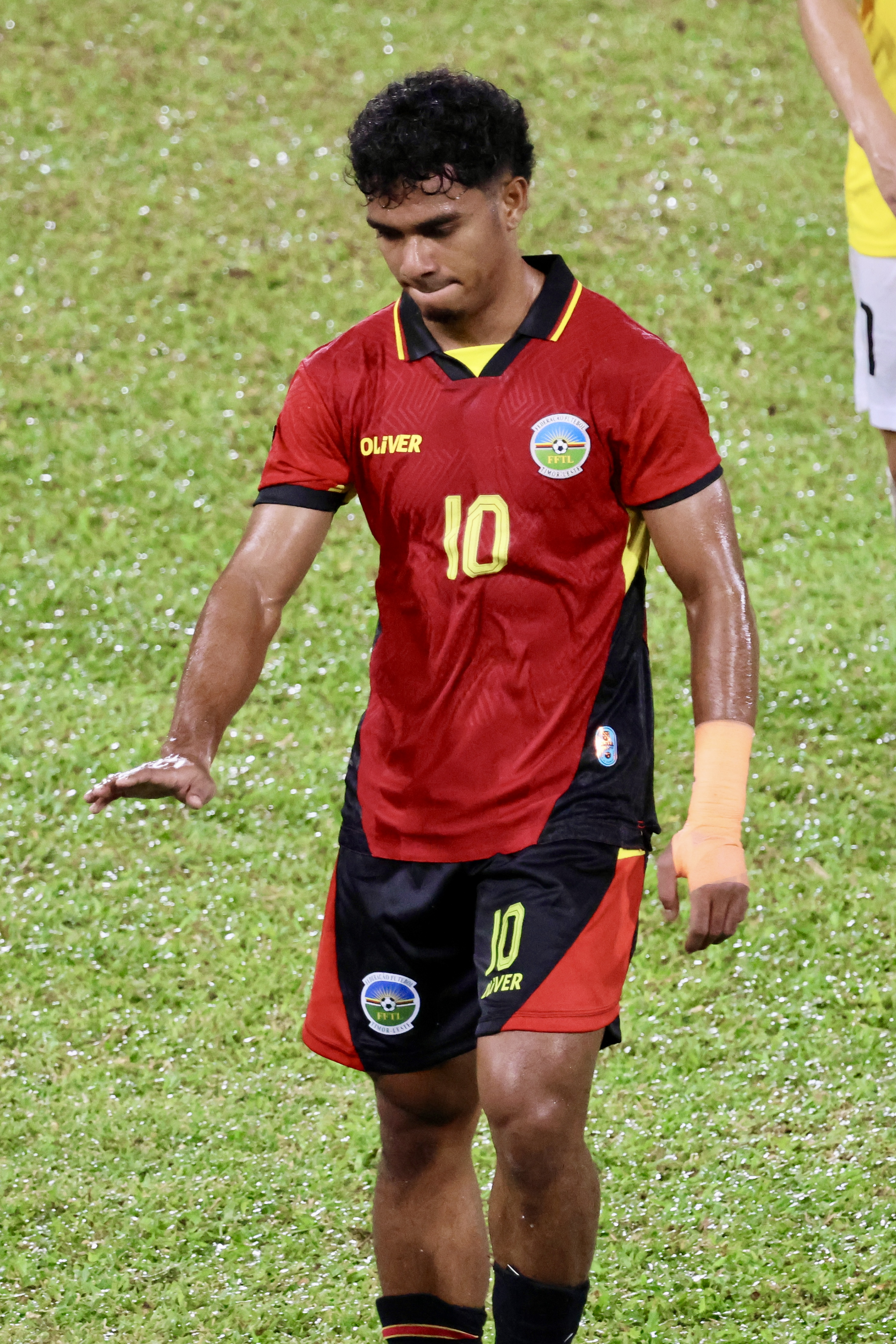
João Pedro is Timor-Leste's top scorer with 8 goals.

Rank	Name	Goals	Caps	Ratio	Career
1	**João Pedro**	9	30	0.3	2018–present
2	Rufino Gama	7	22	0.32	2016–2022
3	Murilo de Almeida	6	7	0.86	2012–2014
4	Chiquito do Carmo	4	16	0.25	2010–2016
4	Anggisu Barbosa	4	30	0.13	2008–2016
6	Adélio Guterres	3	4	0.75	2006–2007
6	Alan Leandro	3	5	0.6	2012
6	**Mouzinho**	3	12	0.25	2019–present
6	Emilio da Silva	3	12	0.25	2004–2012
6	Henrique Cruz	3	25	0.12	2015–2018
6	Adelino Trindade	3	27	0.11	2010–2018

== Competition records ==
=== FIFA World Cup ===
FIFA World Cup									Qualification					
Year	Result	Position	Pld	W	D*	L	F	A	Pld	W	D	L	F	A
(Uruguay) 1930 to (West Germany) 1974	Part of Portugal								Part of Portugal					
(Argentina) 1978 to (France) 1998	Part of Indonesia								Part of Indonesia					
(South Korea) (Japan) 2002	Not member of FIFA								Not member of FIFA					
(Germany) 2006	Did not enter								Did not enter					
(South Africa) 2010	Did not qualify								2	0	0	2	3	11
(Brazil) 2014	Did not qualify								2	0	0	2	1	7
(Russia) 2018	Did not qualify								10	2	0	8	5	45
(Qatar) 2022	Did not qualify								2	0	0	2	2	12
(Canada) (Mexico) (United States) 2026	Did not qualify								2	0	0	2	0	7
(Morocco) (Portugal) (Spain) 2030	To be determined								To be determined					
(Saudi Arabia) 2034	To be determined								To be determined					
Total	—	0/5	–	–	–	–	–	–	18	2	0	16	11	82

=== AFC Asian Cup ===
AFC Asian Cup									AFC Asian Cup qualification					
Year	Round	Position	Pld	W	D	L	GF	GA	Pld	W	D	L	GF	GA
1956 to 1972	Part of Portugal								Part of Portugal					
1976 to 1996	Part of Indonesia								Part of Indonesia					
(Lebanon) 2000	Did not exist, under United Nations								Did not exist, under United Nations					
(China) 2004	Did not qualify								2	0	0	2	2	6
2007 to 2015	Did not enter								Did not enter					
(United Arab Emirates) 2019	Did not qualify								14	2	2	10	9	47
(Qatar) 2023	Disqualified								2	0	0	2	2	12
(Saudi Arabia) 2027	Did not qualify								4	1	0	3	4	10
Total	—	—	–	–	–	–	–	–	21	3	2	16	17	73

=== AFC Challenge Cup ===
AFC Challenge Cup									AFC Challenge Cup qualification					
Year	Result	Position	Pld	W	D*	L	GF	GA	Pld	W	D	L	GF	GA
(Bangladesh) 2006	Did not participate								Selected but removed					
(India) 2008	Did not enter								Did not enter					
(Sri Lanka) 2010	Did not enter								Did not enter					
(Nepal) 2012	Did not enter								Did not enter					
(Maldives) 2014	Did not enter								Did not enter					
Total	—	—	–	–	–	–	–	–	–	–	–	–	–	–

- 2006 – Was originally selected to take part, but was then replaced
- 2008 – Was selected to take part, but withdrew

=== AFC Solidarity Cup ===
AFC Solidarity Cup
Year	Result	Position	Pld	W	D	L	GF	GA
(Malaysia) 2016	Group stage	6th	2	0	1	1	0	4
Total	Group stage	1/1	2	0	1	1	0	4

=== ASEAN Championship ===
ASEAN Championship record									Qualification record					
Year	Result	Position	Pld	W	D	L	GF	GA	Pld	W	D	L	GF	GA
(Singapore) 1996	Part of Indonesia								Part of Indonesia					
(Vietnam) 1998	Part of Indonesia								Part of Indonesia					
(Thailand) 2000	Under United Nations								Under United Nations					
(Indonesia) (Singapore) 2002	Under United Nations								Under United Nations					
(Malaysia) (Vietnam) 2004	Group stage	9th	4	0	0	4	2	18	No qualification					
(Singapore) (Thailand) 2007	Did not qualify								4	0	0	4	5	17
(Indonesia) (Thailand) 2008	Did not qualify								4	0	1	3	4	9
(Indonesia) (Vietnam) 2010	Did not qualify								3	0	0	3	3	15
(Malaysia) (Thailand) 2012	Did not qualify								4	2	0	2	10	6
(Singapore) (Vietnam) 2014	Did not qualify								4	1	1	2	6	7
(Myanmar) (Philippines) 2016	Did not qualify								3	0	0	3	4	7
(ASEAN) 2018	Group stage	10th	4	0	0	4	4	19	2	1	0	1	3	2
(Singapore) 2020	Group stage	10th	4	0	0	4	0	13	Opponents withdrew					
(ASEAN) 2022	Did not qualify								2	1	0	1	3	6
(ASEAN) 2024	Group stage	10th	4	0	0	4	3	0	2	2	0	0	6	1
(ASEAN) 2026	Group stage	9th	4	0	0	4	0	15	2	1	1	0	1	0
Total	Group stage	5/16	20	0	0	20	9	83	30	8	3	19	45	69

ASEAN Championship History
Season	Round	Opponent	Scores	Venue
2004	Group B	Malaysia	0–5	Kuala Lumpur, Malaysia
2004	Group B	Thailand	0–8	Kuala Lumpur, Malaysia
2004	Group B	Philippines	1–2	Kuala Lumpur, Malaysia
2004	Group B	Myanmar	1–3	Kuala Lumpur, Malaysia
2018	Group B	Thailand	0–7	Bangkok, Thailand
2018	Group B	Indonesia	1–3	Jakarta, Indonesia
2018	Group B	Philippines	2–3	Kuala Lumpur, Malaysia
2018	Group B	Singapore	1–6	Kallang, Singapore
2020	Group A	Thailand	0–2	Kallang, Singapore
2020	Group A	Myanmar	0–2	Kallang, Singapore
2020	Group A	Philippines	0–7	Kallang, Singapore
2020	Group A	Singapore	0–2	Kallang, Singapore

=== FIFA ASEAN Challenge Cup ===
FIFA ASEAN Challenge Cup record
Year	Result	Position	Pld	W	D	L	GF	GA
(Hong Kong) 2026	Group stage	5th	2	0	1	1	2	4

=== Lusofonia Games ===
Jogos da Lusofonia
Year	Round	Position	Pld	W	D*	L	GF	GA
(Macau) 2006	Group stage	9th	0	0	0	2	0	10
(Portugal) 2009	Did not enter							
(India) 2014	Did not enter							
Total	Group stage	1/3	0	0	0	2	0	10

Lusofonia Games
Date	Venue	Opponents	Score	Year
4 October 2006	Macau University of Science and Technology Sports Field	Mozambique U-20	0–5	2006 Lusofonia Games
6 October 2006	Macau University of Science and Technology Sports Field	Angola U-20	0–5	2006 Lusofonia Games

== Head-to-head record ==
As of 30 September 2026

Team	Pld	W	D	L	GF	GA	GD	WPCT
Brunei	14	6	1	7	22	26	−4	42.86
Cambodia	12	1	3	8	20	30	−10	8.33
Chinese Taipei	6	0	0	6	3	17	−14	0.00
Hong Kong	2	0	0	2	3	11	−8	0.00
Indonesia	7	0	0	7	2	24	−22	0.00
Laos	7	1	0	6	9	18	−9	14.29
Lebanon	1	0	0	1	0	4	−4	0.00
Malaysia	8	0	1	7	5	25	−20	0.00
Maldives	2	1	0	1	2	2	0	50.00
Mongolia	4	3	0	1	9	4	+5	75.00
Myanmar	5	0	1	4	2	9	−7	0.00
Nepal	4	0	2	2	3	9	−6	0.00
Palestine	2	0	1	1	1	8	−7	0.00
Philippines	9	1	0	8	6	33	−27	11.11
Saudi Arabia	2	0	0	2	0	17	−17	0.00
Singapore	4	0	0	4	1	13	−12	0.00
Sri Lanka	1	0	0	1	2	3	−1	0.00
Thailand	4	0	0	4	0	27	−27	0.00
Tajikistan	2	0	0	2	0	6	−6	0.00
United Arab Emirates	2	0	0	2	0	9	−9	0.00
Vietnam	1	0	0	1	0	7	−7	0.00
Total	99	13	9	77	90	302	−212	13.13

Source: Results

=== Regional record ===
Last meet up against Southeast Asia countries
Opponents	Year	Score	Outcome	Match type
Brunei	9 June 2026	3−1	Win	2026 ASEAN Championship qualification
Cambodia	30 September 2026	2−2	Draw	2026 FIFA ASEAN Challenge Cup
Indonesia	31 July 2026	0−3	Lost	2026 ASEAN Championship
Laos	3 December 2017	1−2	Lost	Friendly
Malaysia	11 December 2024	2−3	Lost	2024 ASEAN Championship
Myanmar	24 September 2026	0−2	Lost	2026 FIFA ASEAN Challenge Cup
Philippines	14 October 2025	1−3	Lost	2027 AFC Asian Cup qualification
Singapore	27 July 2026	0−2	Lost	2026 ASEAN Championship
Thailand	8 December 2024	0−10	Lost	2024 ASEAN Championship
Vietnam	24 July 2026	0−7	Lost	2026 ASEAN Championship

== See also ==
- Timor-Leste national under-23 football team
- Timor-Leste national under-21 football team
- Timor-Leste national under-20 football team
- Timor-Leste national under-17 football team
- Timor-Leste women's national football team
- Timor-Leste national futsal team
