= 2022 AFF U-23 Championship squads =

Below are the squads for the 2022 AFF U-23 Championship, which took place between 14 and 26 February 2022.

== Group A ==
=== Cambodia ===
Head coach : (Japan) Ryu Hirose

| No. | Pos. | Player | Date of birth (age) | Caps | Goals | Club |
|---|---|---|---|---|---|---|
| | GK | Vireak Dara | 30 October 2003 (age 22) | | | (Football Federation of Cambodia) Visakha |
| | GK | Hul Kimhuy | 7 April 2000 (age 26) | | | (Football Federation of Cambodia) Boeung Ket |
| | GK | Koy Salim | 10 December 2002 (age 23) | | | (Football Federation of Cambodia) Boeung Ket |
| | DF | Yue Safy | 8 November 2000 (age 25) | | | (Football Federation of Cambodia) Phnom Penh Crown |
| | DF | Seut Baraing | 29 September 1999 (age 27) | | | (Football Federation of Cambodia) Phnom Penh Crown |
| | DF | Ny Sokry | 7 September 2001 (age 25) | | | (Football Federation of Cambodia) Preah Khan Reach Svay Rieng |
| | DF | Leng Nora | 19 September 2004 (age 22) | | | (Football Federation of Cambodia) Visakha |
| | DF | Tes Sambath | 20 October 2000 (age 25) | | | (Football Federation of Cambodia) Visakha |
| | DF | Soeuth Nava | 13 February 2001 (age 25) | | | (Football Federation of Cambodia) Boeung Ket |
| | DF | Taing Bunchhay | 28 December 2002 (age 23) | | | (Football Federation of Cambodia) Boeung Ket |
| | DF | Chhoeung Visinu | 1 February 2000 (age 26) | | | (Football Federation of Cambodia) Electricite du Cambodge |
| | DF | Chan Sarapich | 5 April 2002 (age 24) | | | (Football Federation of Cambodia) Prey Veng |
| | DF | Sor Rotana | 9 October 2002 (age 24) | | | (Football Federation of Cambodia) Prey Veng |
| | DF | Ath Ontoch | 1 February 2002 (age 24) | | | (Football Federation of Cambodia) Prey Veng |
| | MF | Choun Chanchav | 5 May 1999 (age 27) | | | (Football Federation of Cambodia) Phnom Penh Crown |
| | MF | Min Ratanak | 30 July 2002 (age 24) | | | (Football Federation of Cambodia) Preah Khan Reach Svay Rieng |
| | MF | Ean Pisey | 11 March 2002 (age 24) | | | (Football Federation of Cambodia) Preah Khan Reach Svay Rieng |
| | MF | Lim Aarun Raymond | 25 June 2003 (age 23) | | | (Football Federation of Cambodia) Boeung Ket |
| | MF | San Kimheng | 2 March 2000 (age 26) | | | (Football Federation of Cambodia) Boeung Ket |
| | MF | Nhean Sosidan | 11 October 2002 (age 24) | | | (Football Federation of Cambodia) Tiffy Army |
| | MF | Nop David | 18 July 2000 (age 26) | | | (Football Federation of Cambodia) Electricite du Cambodge |
| | MF | Sin Sovannmakara | 6 December 2004 (age 21) | | | (Football Federation of Cambodia) Prey Veng |
| | FW | Ky Rina | 5 August 2002 (age 24) | | | (Football Federation of Cambodia) Visakha |
| | FW | Sa Ty | 4 April 2002 (age 24) | | | (Football Federation of Cambodia) Visakha |
| | FW | Rath Virak | 29 July 2001 (age 25) | | | (Football Federation of Cambodia) Visakha |
| | FW | Sieng Chanthea | 9 September 2002 (age 24) | | | (Football Federation of Cambodia) Boeung Ket |
| | FW | Mao Piseth | 17 February 2000 (age 26) | | | (Football Federation of Cambodia) Angkor Tiger |
| | FW | Narong Kakada | 5 July 1999 (age 27) | | | (Football Federation of Cambodia) Tiffy Army |

=== Timor Leste ===
Head oach: (Brazil) Fábio Magrão

| No. | Pos. | Player | Date of birth (age) | Club |
|---|---|---|---|---|
| 1 | GK | Junildo Pereira | 17 August 2003 (aged 18) | (East Timor Football Federation) Assalam |
| 12 | GK | Filonito Nogueira | 16 November 2004 (aged 17) | (East Timor Football Federation) SLB Laulara |
| 20 | GK | Georgino Mendonça | 16 March 2002 (aged 19) | (East Timor Football Federation) SLB Laulara |
| 2 | DF | Olagar Xavier | 18 May 2003 (aged 18) | (East Timor Football Federation) Ponta Leste |
| 3 | DF | Orcelio | 30 April 2001 (aged 20) | (East Timor Football Federation) Karketu Dili |
| 4 | DF | Jaimito Soares | 10 June 2003 (aged 18) | (East Timor Football Federation) Karketu Dili |
| 5 | DF | Tomas Sarmento | 24 August 2000 (aged 21) | (East Timor Football Federation) SLB Laulara |
| 13 | DF | Gumario | 8 October 2001 (aged 20) | (East Timor Football Federation) Lalenok United |
| 16 | DF | João Bosco | 2 March 2003 (aged 18) | (East Timor Football Federation) Ponta Leste |
| 18 | DF | Filomeno Junior | 5 August 2000 (aged 21) | (East Timor Football Federation) SLB Laulara |
| 22 | DF | Nelson Viegas | 24 December 1999 (aged 22) | (East Timor Football Federation) Boavista Timor Leste |
| 24 | DF | Yohanes Gusmão | 1 April 2000 (aged 21) | (East Timor Football Federation) Ponta Leste |
| 28 | DF | João Panji | 29 October 2000 (aged 21) | (East Timor Football Federation) Assalam |
| 6 | MF | Jhon Frith | 17 July 2002 (aged 19) | (East Timor Football Federation) Lalenok United |
| 8 | MF | Dom Lucas | 14 March 2001 (aged 20) | (East Timor Football Federation) Assalam |
| 10 | MF | Mouzinho | 14 March 2001 (aged 20) | (East Timor Football Federation) SLB Laulara |
| 11 | MF | Kornelis Nahak | 12 January 2001 (aged 21) | (East Timor Football Federation) SLB Laulara |
| 14 | MF | Santiago Da Costa | 13 April 1999 (aged 22) | (East Timor Football Federation) Lalenok United |
| 15 | MF | Natalino Da Costa | 3 August 2003 (aged 18) | (East Timor Football Federation) Karketu Dili |
| 19 | MF | Mário Quintão | 18 March 2004 (aged 17) | (East Timor Football Federation) Emmanuel |
| 21 | MF | Paulo Gali | 31 December 2004 (aged 17) | (East Timor Football Federation) Lalenok United |
| 23 | MF | Cristevão Fernandes | 16 January 2004 (aged 18) | (East Timor Football Federation) SLB Laulara |
| 7 | FW | Elias Mesquita | 27 March 2002 (aged 19) | (East Timor Football Federation) Lalenok United |
| 9 | FW | Anizo Correia | 23 May 2003 (aged 20) | (East Timor Football Federation) Ponta Leste |
| 17 | FW | Zenivio | 22 April 2005 (aged 18) | (East Timor Football Federation) SLB Laulara |
| 26 | FW | Alexandro Kefi | 20 December 2004 (aged 18) | (East Timor Football Federation) SLB Laulara |

=== Philippines ===
Head coach: (England) Stewart Hall

The final squad was announced on 10 February 2022.

| No. | Pos. | Player | Date of birth (age) | Caps | Goals | Club |
|---|---|---|---|---|---|---|
| 1 | GK | Quincy Kammeraad | 1 February 2001 (aged 21) | 4 | 0 | (Philippine Football Federation) ADT |
| 20 | GK | Enrico Mangaoang | 28 May 2002 (aged 19) | 0 | 0 | (Philippine Football Federation) De La Salle University |
| 22 | GK | Jessie Semblante | 22 April 2000 (aged 21) | 0 | 0 | (Philippine Football Federation) Mendiola 1991 |
| 3 | DF | Gyles Encabo | 9 February 1999 (aged 23) | 1 | 0 | (Philippine Football Federation) Stallion Laguna |
| 5 | DF | Elijah Liao | | 0 | 0 | (Philippine Football Federation) Ateneo De Manila University |
| 12 | DF | Miguel Mendoza | 3 February 1999 (aged 23) | 4 | 0 | unattached |
| 15 | DF | Pete Forrosuelo | 6 July 1999 (aged 22) | 1 | 0 | (Philippine Football Federation) ADT |
| 18 | DF | Jaime Rosquillo | 10 March 2003 (aged 18) | 1 | 0 | (Philippine Football Federation) Dynamic Herb Cebu |
| 25 | DF | Jayvee Kallukaran | 7 September 2000 (aged 21) | 0 | 0 | (Philippine Football Federation) Stallion Laguna |
| | DF | David Setters | 19 May 2004 (aged 17) | 1 | 0 | (The Football Association) Portsmouth Academy |
| 4 | MF | Jacob Maniti | 16 October 2002 (aged 19) | 2 | 0 | (Football Australia) Macarthur FC |
| 6 | MF | Oskari Kekkonen | 24 September 1999 (aged 22) | 4 | 0 | (Philippine Football Federation) Kaya–Iloilo |
| 7 | MF | Dennis Chung | 24 January 2001 (aged 21) | 8 | 1 | (Philippine Football Federation) ADT |
| 8 | MF | Sandro Reyes | 29 March 2003 (aged 18) | 4 | 0 | (Philippine Football Federation) Kaya–Iloilo |
| 9 | MF | Kieran Hayes | 4 January 1999 (aged 23) | 2 | 0 | (Philippine Football Federation) United City |
| 14 | MF | Jacob Peña | 27 November 2002 (aged 19) | 1 | 0 | (Philippine Football Federation) Stallion Laguna |
| 16 | MF | Pocholo Bugas | 3 December 2001 (aged 20) | 2 | 0 | (Philippine Football Federation) United City |
| 19 | MF | Nathan Rilloraza | 16 October 2002 (aged 19) | 1 | 0 | (Royal Spanish Football Federation) Global M Málaga |
| 21 | MF | Antoine Ortega | 12 May 2003 (aged 18) | 1 | 0 | (Royal Spanish Football Federation) Badalona |
| 23 | MF | Scott Woods | 7 May 2000 (aged 21) | 1 | 0 | (United States Soccer Federation) Northeastern State University |
| | MF | Oliver Bias (captain) | 15 June 2001 (aged 20) | 3 | 0 | (Philippine Football Federation) ADT |
| | MF | Lance Ocampo | 23 September 2001 (aged 20) | 0 | 0 | (Philippine Football Federation) ADT |
| 11 | MF | Griffin McDaniel | 30 March 2000 (aged 21) | 2 | 0 | (Philippine Football Federation) Stallion Laguna |
| 13 | FW | Mariano Suba Jr. | 2 January 2000 (aged 22) | 8 | 0 | (Philippine Football Federation) Mendiola 1991 |
| 17 | FW | Ivan Ouano | 6 March 2000 (aged 21) | 2 | 2 | (Philippine Football Federation) ADT |
| 27 | FW | Andres Aldeguer | 18 December 2003 (aged 18) | 0 | 0 | (Philippine Football Federation) ADT |

=== Brunei ===
Head coach: (Brunei) Aminuddin Jumat

The final squad was announced on 8 February 2022.

| No. | Pos. | Player | Date of birth (age) | Caps | Goals | Club |
|---|---|---|---|---|---|---|
| 1 | GK | Abdul Mutalip Mohammad | 7 January 1999 (aged 23) | 0 | 0 | (Football Association of Brunei Darussalam) BIBD SRC |
| 2 | DF | Amirul Aizad Zaidi | 29 July 2002 (aged 19) | 0 | 0 | (Football Association of Brunei Darussalam) Indera SC |
| 3 | DF | Ridhwan Nokman | 10 May 2000 (aged 21) | 1 | 0 | (Football Association of Brunei Darussalam) Indera SC |
| 4 | DF | Nazif Safwan Jaini | 18 August 2000 (aged 21) | 6 | 0 | (Football Association of Brunei Darussalam) Kota Ranger |
| 5 | DF | Nur Aiman Aliman | 22 July 1999 (aged 22) | 2 | 0 | (Football Association of Brunei Darussalam) MS ABDB |
| 6 | DF | Wafi Aminuddin | 20 September 2000 (aged 21) | 7 | 0 | (Football Association of Brunei Darussalam) DPMM FC |
| 7 | MF | Nur Asyraffahmi Norsamri | 4 May 2000 (aged 21) | 7 | 0 | (Football Association of Brunei Darussalam) DPMM FC |
| 8 | MF | Eddy Shahrol Omar | 4 October 2003 (aged 18) | 0 | 0 | (Football Association of Brunei Darussalam) Kasuka FC |
| 9 | FW | Hanif Aiman Adanan | 4 March 2000 (aged 21) | 2 | 0 | (Football Association of Brunei Darussalam) Kasuka FC |
| 10 | MF | Hakeme Yazid Said | 8 February 2003 (aged 19) | 5 | 0 | (Football Association of Brunei Darussalam) DPMM FC |
| 11 | MF | Alinur Rashimy Jufri | 12 June 2000 (aged 21) | 0 | 0 | (Football Association of Brunei Darussalam) Kasuka FC |
| 12 | FW | Syafiq Abdullah Ghazali | 23 July 2003 (aged 18) | 0 | 0 | (Football Association of Brunei Darussalam) KB FC |
| 13 | DF | Khoirunnaas Khalid | 1 July 2001 (aged 20) | 0 | 0 | (Football Association of Brunei Darussalam) Ar Rawda |
| 14 | DF | Hirman Abdul Latip | 25 March 2003 (aged 18) | 0 | 0 | (Football Association of Brunei Darussalam) Indera SC |
| 15 | DF | Nazry Aiman Azaman | 1 July 2004 (aged 17) | 0 | 0 | (Football Association of Brunei Darussalam) DPMM FC |
| 16 | MF | Abdul Hariz Herman | 24 September 2000 (aged 21) | 3 | 0 | (Football Association of Brunei Darussalam) MS ABDB |
| 17 | FW | Syaherrul Affendy Syahmirul Nizam | 13 January 2004 (aged 18) | 0 | 0 | (Football Association of Brunei Darussalam) DPMM FC |
| 18 | MF | Abdul Wadud Ramli | 18 March 1999 (aged 22) | 0 | 0 | (Football Association of Brunei Darussalam) MS PPDB |
| 19 | MF | Syafiq Safiuddin Abdul Shariff | 16 July 2002 (aged 19) | 0 | 0 | (Football Association of Brunei Darussalam) Indera SC |
| 20 | GK | Danish Aiman Mardianni | 9 January 2003 (aged 19) | 0 | 0 | (Football Association of Brunei Darussalam) DPMM FC |
| 21 | DF | Nazhan Zulkifle | 17 January 2001 (aged 21) | 0 | 0 | (Football Association of Brunei Darussalam) Kasuka FC |
| 22 | DF | Radzillah Abdul Ghani | 16 April 2000 (aged 21) | 0 | 0 | (Football Association of Brunei Darussalam) Panchor Murai |
| 23 | MF | Danisyh Syariee Masrazni | 11 September 2004 (aged 17) | 0 | 0 | (Football Association of Brunei Darussalam) DPMM FC |
| 24 | MF | Haziq Hafizhan Hardi | 24 March 2001 (aged 20) | 0 | 0 | (Football Association of Brunei Darussalam) Kasuka FC |
| 25 | GK | Haziq Hazwan Wahid | 6 March 2000 (aged 21) | 0 | 0 | (Football Association of Brunei Darussalam) Wijaya FC |
| 26 | DF | Alin Syahmi Hossaini | 5 July 2001 (aged 20) | 0 | 0 | (Football Association of Brunei Darussalam) Wijaya FC |

== Group B ==
=== Malaysia ===
Head coach: (Australia) Brad Maloney

| No. | Pos. | Player | Date of birth (age) | Caps | Goals | Club |
|---|---|---|---|---|---|---|
| | GK | Syed Nasrulhaq | 6 March 1999 (age 27) | 0 | 0 | (Football Association of Malaysia) Terengganu |
| | GK | Sikh Izhan Nazrel | 23 March 2002 (age 24) | 0 | 0 | (Royal Spanish Football Federation) Fuenlabrada |
| | GK | Aizat Aiman | 24 September 1999 (age 27) | 0 | 0 | (Football Association of Malaysia) Projek FAM-MSN |
| | GK | Firdaus Irman | 23 July 2001 (age 25) | 0 | 0 | (Football Association of Malaysia) PDRM |
| | DF | Zikri Khalili | 25 June 2002 (age 24) | 3 | 0 | (Football Association of Malaysia) Selangor |
| | DF | Azrin Afiq | 2 January 2002 (age 24) | 0 | 0 | (Football Association of Malaysia) Selangor |
| | DF | Faiz Amer | 15 February 2003 (age 23) | 0 | 0 | (Football Association of Malaysia) Selangor II |
| | DF | Fakrul Iman | 29 March 2001 (age 25) | 0 | 0 | (Football Association of Malaysia) Selangor II |
| | DF | Zainal Abidin Jamil | 5 August 1999 (age 27) | 0 | 0 | (Football Association of Malaysia) Petaling Jaya City |
| | DF | Shivan Pillay | 7 December 2000 (age 25) | 0 | 0 | (Football Association of Malaysia) Petaling Jaya City |
| | DF | Hanafie Tokyo | 25 March 1999 (age 27) | 0 | 0 | (Football Association of Malaysia) Sabah |
| | DF | Tasnim Fitri | 19 January 1999 (age 27) | 0 | 0 | (Football Association of Malaysia) Sarawak United |
| | DF | Harith Haiqal | 22 June 2002 (age 24) | 3 | 0 | (Football Association of Malaysia) Selangor |
| | MF | Nureizkhan Isa | 6 October 2000 (age 26) | 0 | 0 | (Football Association of Malaysia) Sabah |
| | MF | Shafi Azswad | 9 March 2001 (age 25) | 0 | 0 | (Football Association of Malaysia) Johor Darul Ta'zim II |
| | MF | Aiman Afif | 18 February 2001 (age 25) | 0 | 0 | (Football Association of Malaysia) Kedah Darul Aman |
| | MF | Arif Shaqirin | 13 March 2000 (age 26) | 0 | 0 | (Football Association of Malaysia) Kuala Lumpur City |
| | MF | Thivandaran Karnan | 8 March 1999 (age 27) | 0 | 0 | (Football Association of Malaysia) Penang |
| | MF | Ruventhiran Vengadesan | 24 August 2001 (age 25) | 0 | 0 | (Football Association of Malaysia) Petaling Jaya City |
| | MF | Gerald Gadit | 16 May 1999 (age 27) | 0 | 0 | (Football Association of Malaysia) Sabah |
| | MF | Selvan Anbualagan | 5 November 2000 (age 25) | 0 | 0 | (Football Association of Malaysia) Negeri Sembilan |
| | MF | Ubaidullah Shamsul | 30 November 2003 (age 22) | 0 | 0 | (Football Association of Malaysia) Projek FAM-MSN |
| | FW | N.Javabilaarivin | 17 July 2000 (age 26) | 0 | 0 | (Football Association of Malaysia) Negeri Sembilan |
| | FW | Azhad Harraz | 9 May 2003 (age 23) | 1 | 0 | (Football Association of Malaysia) Sabah |
| | FW | Zharmein Ashraf | 30 March 2002 (age 24) | 0 | 0 | (Football Association of Malaysia) Sarawak United |
| | FW | Azfar Fikri | 5 February 2000 (age 26) | 3 | 2 | (Football Association of Malaysia) Terengganu II |
| | FW | T. Saravanan | 26 February 2001 (age 25) | 0 | 0 | (Football Association of Malaysia) Penang |
| | FW | Harith Naem | 26 January 2002 (age 24) | 0 | 0 | (Football Association of Malaysia) Melaka United |

=== Laos ===
Head coach: (Germany) Michael Weiß

| No. | Pos. | Player | Date of birth (age) | Caps | Goals | Club |
|---|---|---|---|---|---|---|
| 1 | GK | Seeamphone Sengsavang | 3 March 2001 (age 25) | | | (Lao Football Federation) Young Elephant |
| 12 | GK | Keo-Oudone Souvannasangso | 19 June 2000 (age 26) | | | (Lao Football Federation) Lao Army |
| 26 | GK | Phounin Xayyasone | | | | (Lao Football Federation) Ezra |
| 2 | DF | Phoutthavong Sangvilay | 16 October 2004 (age 21) | | | (Lao Football Federation) Ezra |
| 5 | DF | At Viengkham | 24 October 2000 (age 25) | | | (Lao Football Federation) Master 7 |
| 27 | DF | Thilaphon Pathammavong | 8 September 1998 (age 28) | | | (Lao Football Federation) Twenty Six FC |
| 19 | DF | Nalongsit Chanthalangsy | 3 December 2001 (age 24) | | | (Lao Football Federation) Champasak FC |
| 24 | DF | Channichone Chanthavong | 23 October 2000 (age 25) | | | (Lao Football Federation) Champasak FC |
| 4 | DF | Phetdavanh Somsanid | 24 April 2004 (age 22) | | | (Lao Football Federation) Champasak FC |
| 16 | DF | Inthachak Sisouphan | | | | (Lao Football Federation) Luang Prabang FC |
| 13 | MF | Thanouthong Kietnalonglop | 5 March 2001 (age 25) | | | (Lao Football Federation) Young Elephant |
| 15 | MF | Damoth Thongkhamsavath | 13 April 2004 (age 22) | | | (Lao Football Federation) Champasak FC |
| 21 | MF | Guijeng Noupakdee | | | | (Lao Football Federation) Champasak FC |
| 8 | MF | Bounmy Pinkeo | 29 September 2002 (age 24) | | | (Lao Football Federation) Champasak FC |
| 22 | MF | Phouvieng Phounsavath | 12 November 2002 (age 23) | | | (Lao Football Federation) Champasak FC |
| 25 | MF | Thongsamai Pinnalone | | | | (Lao Football Federation) Champasak FC |
| 3 | MF | Anouksak Luangamat | | | | (Lao Football Federation) Vientiane |
| 18 | MF | Vongphachanh Phoutthavong | 26 April 2003 (age 23) | | | (Lao Football Federation) Twenty Six FC |
| 6 | MF | Chanthavixay Khounthoumphone | | | | (Lao Football Federation) Savannakhet Province |
| 7 | MF | Khonesavanh Keonuchanh | 4 June 2004 (age 22) | | | (Lao Football Federation) Chanthabouly |
| 9 | FW | Thipphachanh Khambaione | 2 August 2004 (age 22) | | | (Lao Football Federation) Champasak FC |
| 17 | FW | Bounphachan Bounkong (Captain) | 29 September 2000 (age 26) | | | (Lao Football Federation) Young Elephant |
| 10 | FW | Chony Waenpaseuth | 27 November 2002 (age 23) | | | (Lao Football Federation) Ezra |
| 20 | FW | Souksakhone Bouaphaivanh | 10 May 2001 (age 25) | | | (Lao Football Federation) Chanthabouly |
| 23 | FW | Visith Bounpaserth | 23 January 2002 (age 24) | | | (Lao Football Federation) Salavan Province |

== Group C ==
=== Thailand ===
Head coach: (Spain) Salva Valero Garcia

The final squad was announced on 1 February 2022.

| No. | Pos. | Player | Date of birth (age) | Caps | Goals | Club |
|---|---|---|---|---|---|---|
| 1 | GK | Narongsak Nuangwongsa | 19 February 2003 (age 23) | | | (Football Association of Thailand) See Khwae City |
| 20 | GK | Narawich Inthacharoen | 11 November 2003 (age 22) | | | (Football Association of Thailand) Chiangmai |
| 23 | GK | Kasidej Rungkitwattananukul | 23 April 2004 (age 22) | | | (Football Association of Thailand) Assumption United |
| 2 | DF | Phakphum Kunkongmee | 1 February 2004 (age 22) | | | (Football Association of Thailand) Assumption United |
| 3 | DF | Thawatchai Inprakhon | 31 March 2003 (age 23) | | | (Football Association of Thailand) Buriram United |
| 4 | DF | Theekawin Chansri | 17 February 2004 (age 22) | | | (Football Association of Thailand) Assumption United |
| 5 | DF | Chonnapat Buaphan | 22 March 2004 (age 22) | | | (Football Association of Thailand) Rajpracha |
| 13 | DF | Waris Choolthong | 8 January 2004 (age 22) | | | (Football Association of Thailand) Rajpracha |
| 24 | DF | Tony Laurent-Gonnet | 1 May 2003 (age 23) | | | (Football Association of Thailand) Ratchaburi Mitr Phol |
| 26 | DF | Nuttasit Choosai | 21 May 2004 (age 22) | | | (Football Association of Thailand) Wat Bot City |
| 27 | DF | Anusak Jaiphet (captain) | 23 June 1999 (age 27) | | | (Football Association of Thailand) Port |
| 6 | MF | Sittha Boonlha | 2 September 2004 (age 22) | | | (Football Association of Thailand) Port |
| 7 | MF | Kakana Khamyok | 21 May 2004 (age 22) | | | (Football Association of Thailand) Assumption United |
| 12 | MF | Thanawat Saipetch | 27 January 2004 (age 22) | | | (Football Association of Thailand) Prime Bangkok |
| 14 | MF | Seksan Ratree | 14 March 2003 (age 23) | | | (Football Association of Thailand) Buriram United |
| 15 | MF | Chitipat Kaeoyos | 21 March 2003 (age 23) | | | (Football Association of Thailand) Samut Prakan City |
| 16 | MF | Thawatchai Aocharod | 10 January 2003 (age 23) | | | (Football Association of Thailand) Nongbua Pitchaya |
| 18 | MF | Sattawas Leela | 17 February 2003 (age 23) | | | (Football Association of Thailand) Rajpracha |
| 19 | MF | Kroekphon Arbram | 19 May 2003 (age 23) | | | (Football Association of Thailand) Rajpracha |
| 21 | MF | Songkramsamut Namphueng | 7 November 2003 (age 22) | | | (Football Association of Thailand) Police Tero |
| 22 | MF | Woradet Boonmakajornkit | 12 April 2003 (age 23) | | | (Football Association of Thailand) Chamchuri United |
| 8 | FW | Teerasak Poeiphimai | 21 September 2002 (age 24) | | | (Football Association of Thailand) Port |
| 9 | FW | Panupong Wongpila | 15 February 2003 (age 23) | | | (Football Association of Thailand) STK Muangnont |
| 10 | FW | Olaxon A Tamba | 10 June 2003 (age 23) | | | (Football Association of Thailand) Chiangrai City |
| 11 | FW | Niphitphon Wongpanya | 1 February 2004 (age 22) | | | (Football Association of Thailand) Prime Bangkok |
| 17 | FW | Tuwanon Boonma | 12 March 2003 (age 23) | | | (Football Association of Thailand) Debsirin School |
| 25 | FW | Khunanon Chornpradit | 30 May 2003 (age 23) | | | (Football Association of Thailand) Nonthaburi City |
| 28 | FW | Thanawut Phochai | 2 December 2005 (age 20) | | | (Football Association of Thailand) Udon United |

=== Vietnam ===
Head coach: (Vietnam) Đinh Thế Nam

| No. | Pos. | Player | Date of birth (age) | Club |
|---|---|---|---|---|
| 1 | GK | Y Êli Niê | 8 January 2001 (age 25) | (Vietnam Football Federation) Đắk Lắk |
| 25 | GK | Trịnh Xuân Hoàng (until 24 February) | 6 November 2000 (age 25) | (Vietnam Football Federation) Đông Á Thanh Hóa |
| 25 | GK | Trần Liêm Điều (from 24 February) | 19 February 2001 (age 25) | (Vietnam Football Federation) Nam Định |
| 28 | GK | Đặng Tuấn Hưng | 1 May 2000 (age 26) | (Vietnam Football Federation) SHB Đà Nẵng |
| 2 | DF | Hồ Văn Cường | 16 March 2003 (age 23) | (Vietnam Football Federation) Sông Lam Nghệ An |
| 3 | DF | Trần Quang Thịnh | 22 March 2001 (age 25) | (Vietnam Football Federation) Công An Nhân Dân |
| 4 | DF | Võ Minh Trọng (until 22 February) | 24 October 2001 (age 24) | (Vietnam Football Federation) Đồng Tháp |
| 12 | DF | Trần Văn Thắng | 6 July 2001 (age 25) | (Vietnam Football Federation) Phù Đổng |
| 16 | DF | Trương Đức Mạnh | 24 August 2000 (age 26) | (Vietnam Football Federation) Tuấn Tú Phú Thọ |
| 21 | DF | Nguyễn Văn Sơn (until 22 February) | 26 June 2001 (age 25) | (Vietnam Football Federation) Tuấn Tú Phú Thọ |
| 21 | DF | Phan Tuấn Tài (from 22 February) | 7 January 2001 (age 25) | (Vietnam Football Federation) Viettel |
| 22 | DF | Lương Duy Cương | 7 November 2001 (age 24) | (Vietnam Football Federation) SHB Đà Nẵng |
| 24 | DF | Nguyễn Ngọc Thắng (until 22 February) | 2 August 2002 (age 24) | (Vietnam Football Federation) Hồng Lĩnh Hà Tĩnh |
| 26 | DF | Lê Thành Lâm (until 24 February) | 15 June 2000 (age 26) | (Vietnam Football Federation) Đắk Lắk |
| 26 | DF | Đoàn Anh Việt (from 24 February) | 15 August 1999 (age 27) | (Vietnam Football Federation) Than Quảng Ninh |
| 27 | DF | Vũ Tiến Long (until 22 February) | 4 April 2002 (age 24) | (Vietnam Football Federation) Phù Đổng |
| 27 | DF | Nguyễn Thanh Nhân (from 22 February) | 25 October 2000 (age 25) | (Vietnam Football Federation) Khánh Hoà |
| 5 | MF | Nguyễn Thanh Khôi | 25 October 2001 (age 24) | (Vietnam Football Federation) Long An |
| 6 | MF | Dụng Quang Nho (captain) | 1 January 2000 (age 26) | (Vietnam Football Federation) Hải Phòng |
| 7 | MF | Trần Mạnh Quỳnh | 18 January 2001 (age 25) | (Vietnam Football Federation) Sông Lam Nghệ An |
| 8 | MF | Ngô Đức Hoàng (until 22 February) | 28 November 2002 (age 23) | (Vietnam Football Federation) Hà Nội |
| 10 | MF | Đinh Xuân Tiến (until 22 February) | 6 January 2003 (age 23) | (Vietnam Football Federation) Sông Lam Nghệ An |
| 10 | MF | Vũ Đình Hai (from 22 February) | 13 January 2000 (age 26) | (Vietnam Football Federation) Phù Đổng |
| 14 | MF | Hoàng Văn Toản | 1 April 2001 (age 25) | (Vietnam Football Federation) Công An Nhân Dân |
| 17 | MF | Nguyễn Trung Thành | 14 April 2001 (age 25) | (Vietnam Football Federation) Bà Rịa-Vũng Tàu |
| 19 | MF | Mai Xuân Quyết (util 24 February) | 1 April 1999 (age 27) | (Vietnam Football Federation) Nam Định |
| 19 | MF | Hồ Khắc Lương (from 24 February) | 10 January 2001 (age 25) | (Vietnam Football Federation) Sông Lam Nghệ An |
| 20 | MF | Phạm Văn Hữu | 3 June 2001 (age 25) | (Vietnam Football Federation) SHB Đà Nẵng |
| 23 | MF | Phan Bá Quyền | 13 August 2002 (age 24) | (Vietnam Football Federation) Hải Nam Vĩnh Yên Vĩnh Phúc |
| 24 | MF | Đinh Quý (from 22 February) | 25 May 2002 (age 24) | (Vietnam Football Federation) Quảng Nam |
| 4 | FW | Trần Bảo Toàn (from 22 February) | 14 July 2000 (age 26) | (Vietnam Football Federation) Hoàng Anh Gia Lai |
| 9 | FW | Nguyễn Quốc Việt (until 24 February) | 2 October 2003 (age 23) | (Vietnam Football Federation) Nutifood Academy |
| 9 | FW | Võ Nguyên Hoàng (from 24 February) | 7 February 2002 (age 24) | (Vietnam Football Federation) Sài Gòn |
| 11 | FW | Nguyễn Văn Tùng | 7 December 2001 (age 24) | (Vietnam Football Federation) Hà Nội |
| 15 | FW | Nguyễn Văn Tùng | 7 March 2002 (age 24) | (Vietnam Football Federation) Hoà Bình |
| 18 | FW | Bùi Anh Thống (until 22 February) | 24 December 2001 (age 24) | (Vietnam Football Federation) Công An Nhân Dân |
| 18 | FW | Huỳnh Tiến Đạt (from 22 February) | 26 January 2000 (age 26) | (Vietnam Football Federation) Công An Nhân Dân |
| 24 | FW | Nguyễn Ngọc Hậu (from 22 February) | 16 February 2001 (age 25) | (Vietnam Football Federation) Hồ Chí Minh City |

=== Singapore ===
Head coach: (Singapore) Nazri Nasir

| No. | Pos. | Player | Date of birth (age) | Caps | Goals | Club |
|---|---|---|---|---|---|---|
| | GK | Ridhwan Fikri | 29 April 1999 (age 27) | 3 | 0 | (Football Association of Singapore) Young Lions |
| | GK | Kimura Riki | 14 November 2000 (age 25) | 0 | 0 | (Football Association of Singapore) Balestier Khalsa |
| | GK | Umayr Sujuandy | 18 February 2003 (age 23) | 0 | 0 | (Football Association of Singapore) Young Lions |
| | DF | Raoul Suhaimi | 18 September 2005 (age 21) | 1 | 0 | (Football Association of Singapore) Young Lions |
| | DF | Jordan Emaviwe | 9 April 2001 (age 25) | 3 | 1 | (Football Association of Singapore) Young Lions |
| | DF | Danish Irfan | 10 March 1999 (age 27) | 3 | 0 | (Football Association of Singapore) Young Lions |
| | DF | Ryaan Sanizal | 31 May 2002 (age 24) | 2 | 0 | (Football Association of Singapore) Tampines Rovers |
| | DF | Jacob Mahler | 10 April 2000 (age 26) | 19 | 0 | (Football Association of Singapore) Young Lions |
| | DF | Ryhan Stewart | 15 February 2000 (age 26) | 12 | 0 | (Football Association of Singapore) Young Lions |
| | DF | Syed Akmal | 28 April 2000 (age 26) | 12 | 0 | (Football Association of Singapore) Young Lions |
| | DF | Irfan Najeeb | 31 July 1999 (age 27) | 9 | | (Football Association of Singapore) Tampines Rovers |
| | MF | Daniel Goh | 13 August 1999 (age 27) | 4 | 1 | (Football Association of Singapore) Young Lions |
| | MF | Shah Shahiran | 14 November 1999 (age 26) | 9 | 0 | (Football Association of Singapore) Young Lions |
| | MF | Saifullah Akbar | 31 January 1999 (age 27) | 8 | 1 | (Football Association of Singapore) Lion City Sailors |
| | MF | Farhan Zulkifli | 10 November 2002 (age 23) | 3 | 0 | (Football Association of Singapore) Hougang United |
| | MF | Jared Gallagher | 18 January 2002 (age 24) | 1 | | (Football Association of Singapore) Young Lions |
| | MF | Rasaq Akeem | 16 June 2001 (age 25) | 19 | 0 | (Football Association of Singapore) Young Lions |
| | MF | Danish Qayyum | 2 February 2002 (age 24) | 0 | 0 | (Football Association of Singapore) Young Lions |
| | FW | Zikos Vasileios Chua | 15 April 2002 (age 24) | 4 | | (Football Association of Singapore) Young Lions |
| | FW | Glenn Kweh | 26 March 2000 (age 26) | 3 | 2 | (Football Association of Singapore) Young Lions |
| | FW | Khairin Nadim | 8 May 2004 (age 22) | 2 | 0 | (Football Association of Singapore) Young Lions |
| | FW | Zamani Zamri | 31 May 2001 (age 25) | 1 | 0 | (Football Association of Singapore) Young Lions |
| | FW | Nicky Melvin Singh | 16 June 2002 (age 24) | 1 | 0 | (Japan Football Association) Albirex Niigata (S) |
| | FW | Ilhan Fandi | 8 November 2002 (age 23) | 0 | 0 | (Football Association of Singapore) Young Lions |
