= 2023 Hoang Anh Gia Lai FC season =

Hoang Anh Gia Lai FC
2023 season
- Owner: Hoang Anh Gia Lai Sport Join Stock Company
- Chairman: Doan Nguyen Duc
- Manager: Kiatisuk Senamuang
- Stadium: Pleiku Stadium
- V.League 1: 8/14
- Vietnamese Cup: 1/8 round
- Top goalscorer: League: Chau Ngoc Quang (3goals); Paollo Madeira; All: Chau Ngoc Quang (3 goals); Paollo Madeira
- Highest home attendance: 11,000 vs Cong An Hanoi (19 February 2023)
- Lowest home attendance: 9,000 vs Hong Linh Ha Tinh (4 February 2023)
- Average home league attendance: 9.667
- Biggest win: Viettel 1-4 Hoang Anh Gia Lai (6 April 2023)
- Biggest defeat: Song Lam Nghe An 3-1 Hoang Anh Gia Lai (15 April 2023)
- All statistics correct as of 15 April 2023.

The 2023 football season is the 43rd official season in the history of Hoang Anh Gia Lai and the 21st consecutive season the team plays in V.League 1, the highest level football tournament in the Vietnam football tournament.

== Squad ==
#	Pos	Players
1	GK	Dương Văn Lợi
2	DF	Lê Văn Sơn
3	DF	Lê Văn Đại
4	MF	Châu Ngọc Quang
5	DF	Nguyễn Hữu Anh Tài
6	MF	Trần Thanh Sơn
7	FW	Paollo Madeira
8	MF	Trần Minh Vương
9	FW	Đinh Thanh Bình
10	FW	Lê Minh Bình
11	MF	Nguyễn Tuấn Anh(captain)
12	FW	Washington Brandão
17	MF	Võ Đình Lâm
19	FW	Nguyễn Quốc Việt

#	Pos	Players
20	MF	Trần Bảo Toàn
23	DF	Nguyễn Thanh Nhân
24	MF	Nguyễn Đức Việt
25	GK	Trần Trung Kiên
26	GK	Huỳnh Tuấn Linh
27	DF	Nguyễn Văn Triệu
28	FW	Nguyễn Văn Anh
29	MF	Âu Dương Quân
34	MF	Lê Hữu Phước
44	DF	Papé Diakité
62	DF	Phan Du Học
66	MF	Trần Đình Bảo
82	DF	A Hoàng
86	MF	Dụng Quang Nho

== Transfers ==
=== In ===
#	Pos	Players	From	Fee	Ref.
1	HV	(Vietnam) Lê Văn Đại	Becamex Binh Duong	Free	
2	TĐ	(Vietnam) Dụng Quang Nho	Haiphong FC	Borrowing expired	
3	TV	(Vietnam) Châu Ngọc Quang	Haiphong FC	Borrowing expired	
4	HV	(Vietnam) Nguyễn Hữu Anh Tài	Cong An Ha Noi FC	Borrowing expired	
5	TV	(Vietnam) Trần Thanh Sơn	Cong An Ha Noi FC	Borrowing expired	
6	TĐ	(Vietnam) Đinh Thanh Bình	Cong An Ha Noi FC	Borrowing expired	
7	TĐ	(Vietnam) Nguyễn Văn Anh	Cong An Ha Noi FC	Borrowing expired	
8	HV	(Vietnam) Phan Du Học	Cong An Ha Noi FC	Borrowing expired	
9	TV	(Vietnam) Âu Dương Quân	Hue FC	Borrowing expired	
10	TĐ	(Vietnam) Nguyễn Quốc Việt	Nutifood	Free	
11	TV	(Vietnam) Trần Đình Bảo	Ho Chi Minh City FC	Free	
12	TĐ	(Portugal) Paollo Madeira	Hong Linh Ha Tinh FC	Free	
13	HV	(Senegal) Papé Diakité	Terengganu FC	Free	

=== Left ===
#	VT	Players	Come	Fee	Ref.
1	TĐ	(Vietnam) Huỳnh Tiến Đạt	(Vietnam) Topenland Binh Dinh	Free	
2	HV	(Vietnam) Nguyễn Phong Hồng Duy	(Vietnam) Thep Xanh Nam Dinh	Free	
3	HV	(Vietnam) Nguyễn Hữu Tuấn	(Vietnam) Thep Xanh Nam Dinh	Free	
4	TM	(Vietnam) Lê Văn Trường	(Vietnam) Khanh Hoa FC	Free	
5	HV	(Vietnam) Nguyễn Văn Việt	(Vietnam) Khanh Hoa FC	Free	
6	TV	(Vietnam) Lương Xuân Trường	(Vietnam) Haiphong FC	Free	
7	HV	(Vietnam) Vũ Văn Thanh	(Vietnam) Cong An Hanoi	Free	
8	HV	(Vietnam) Steven Đặng	(Vietnam) Becamex Binh Duong	Free	
9	TĐ	(Vietnam) Nguyễn Công Phượng	(Japan) Yokohama FC	Free	
10	TĐ	(Vietnam) Nguyễn Văn Toàn	(South Korea) Seoul E-Land FC	Free	
11	TV	(Vietnam) Trần Hữu Đông Triều	(Vietnam) Quang Nam FC	Free	
12	HV	(South Korea) Ahn Sae-hee	(Malaysia) Penang F.C.	Free	
13	TĐ	(Brazil) Bruno Henrique	Không có	Free	
14	HV	(Brazil) Mauricio Teixeira	(Brazil) Madudeira-RJ	Free	

== Pre-season and friendlies ==
Before the 2023 season, Hoang Anh Gia Lai did not have any friendly matches but only practiced at Ham Rong Football Center.

== Season ==
=== Results ===
Competition	First match	Last match	Starting round	Final position	Record							
Competition	First match	Last match	Starting round	Final position	Pld	W	D	L	GF	GA	GD	Win %
2023 V.League 1	April 15, 2023	-	Round 6		6	1	4	1	8	5	+3	16.67
2023 Vietnamese Cup	June 16/17, 2023		Round of 1/8	-	0	0	0	0	0	0	+0	—
Total					6	1	4	1	8	5	+3	16.67

Last updated: April 15, 2023
Source: Competitions

=== 2023 V.League 1 ===
The 2023 V.League 1 schedule was announced on December 26, 2022.

==== Table ====
Pos	Team	Pld	W	D	L	GF	GA	GD	Pts	Promotion or relegation
8	Hong Linh Ha Tinh	13	4	6	3	20	20	0	18	Qualification to Championship round
9	Song Lam Nghe An	13	3	7	3	14	15	−1	16	Qualification to Relegation round
10	Hoang Anh Gia Lai	13	2	8	3	15	16	−1	14	Qualification to Relegation round
11	Khanh Hoa FC	13	2	7	4	11	14	−3	13	Qualification to Relegation round
12	SHB Da Nang	13	1	7	5	8	15	−7	10	Qualification to Relegation round

Updated to match(es) played on 17 April 2023. Source: VPF
Rules for classification: 1) Points; 2) Goal difference; 3) Goals scored; 4) Disciplinary points; 5) Play-off (Only to decide champions, runners-up, third placed and relegation spots); 6) Drawing of lots

Pos	Team	Pld	W	D	L	GF	GA	GD	Pts	Qualification	HNP	HAN	VTL	DTH	TND	HPG	TBD	HHT
1	Cong An Hanoi (C)	20	11	5	4	39	21	+18	38	Qualification for the ASEAN Club Championship	—	2–1		1–1		0–2		1–1
2	Hanoi FC	20	11	5	4	35	22	+13	38			—	2–1		1–0	3–1	4–2	
3	Viettel	20	8	8	4	23	17	+6	32		0–3		—			2–0	0–0	4–0
4	Dong A Thanh Hoa	20	8	7	5	27	22	+5	31	Qualification to the ASEAN Club Championship (Note: Dong A Thanh Hoa qualified for the ASEAN Club Championship group stage as the 2023 Vietnamese Cup winners.)		1–3	0–1	—	0–2		2–0	
5	Thep Xanh Nam Dinh	20	7	8	5	19	19	0	29		1–2		0–0		—			2–0
6	Haiphong FC	20	6	8	6	20	23	−3	26					0–3	2–0	—	1–2	
7	Topenland Binh Dinh	20	6	6	8	23	28	−5	24		0–1				1–2		—	1–1
8	Hong Linh Ha Tinh	20	4	11	5	24	30	−6	23			2–2		0–0		0–0		—

Updated to match(es) played on 10 August 2023. Source: VPF
Rules for classification: 1) Points; 2) Goal difference; 3) Goals scored; 4) Disciplinary points; 5) Play-off (Only to decide champions, runners-up, third placed and relegation spots); 6) Drawing of lots
(C) Champions
Notes:

Pos	Team	Pld	W	D	L	GF	GA	GD	Pts	SNA	HGL	KHA	BBD	HCM	SDN
9	Song Lam Nghe An	18	6	7	5	19	20	−1	25	—	1–0		0–2	2–0	
10	Hoang Anh Gia Lai	18	5	8	5	19	19	0	23		—	1–0		0–1	1–0
11	Khanh Hoa	18	4	7	7	18	22	−4	19	3–1		—		3–0	1–3
12	Becamex Binh Duong	18	2	9	7	19	23	−4	15		0–1	3–0	—		
13	Ho Chi Minh City	18	4	3	11	21	32	−11	15				0–0	—	1–0

Source: VPF
Rules for classification: 1) Points; 2) Head-to-head points 3) Goal difference; 4) Goals scored; 5) Disciplinary points; 6) Play-off (Only to decide champions, runners-up, third placed and relegation spots); 7) Drawing of lots

Overall								Home						Away					
Pld	W	D	L	GF	GA	GD	Pts	W	D	L	GF	GA	GD	W	D	L	GF	GA	GD
8	1	6	1	12	11	+1	9	0	4	0	4	4	0	1	2	1	8	7	+1

==== Matches ====
Win draw Loss Unplayed

4 February 2023 1 -Phase 1	Hoang Anh Gia Lai FC	0–0	Hong Linh Ha Tinh	Pleiku, Gia Lai
17:00		Report		Stadium: Pleiku Stadium; Attendance: 9.000; Referee: Vũ Nguyên Vũ

8 February 2023 2 - Phase 1	Becamex Binh Duong	1–1	Hoang Anh Gia Lai FC	Thu Dau Mot, Binh Duong
17:00	Rimario Gordon (yellow card) 59' (goal) 90+2'	Report	Châu Ngọc Quang 51'	Stadium: Go Dau Stadium; Attendance: 5.000; Referee: Đỗ Thành Đệ

14 February 2023 3 -Phase 1	Thep Xanh Nam Dinh	2–2	Hoang Anh Gia Lai FC	Nam Dinh, Nam Dinh
18:00	Dương Thanh Hào 2'; Đoàn Thanh Trường 84'	Report	Châu Ngọc Quang 79'; Washington Brandão 90+1'	Stadium: Thien Truong Stadium; Attendance: 18.000

19 February 2023 4 -Phase 1	Hoang Anh Gia Lai FC	1–1	Cong An Ha Noi	Pleiku, Gia Lai
17:00	Papé Diakité (yellow card) 59'; Paollo Oliveira 73'	Report	Phan Văn Đức (yellow card) 76'; Jhon Cley 83'	Stadium: Pleiku Stadium; Attendance: 11.000; Referee: Nguyễn Ngọc Châu

6 April 2023 5 - Phase 1	Viettel	1–4	Hoang Anh Gia Lai FC	Đống Đa, Hà Nội
19:15	Bui Tien Dung (yellow card) 10' (goal) 21' (pen.)	Report	Châu Ngọc Quang 13'; Trần Minh Vương 51'; Nguyễn Quốc Việt 67'; Paollo Oliveira (yellow card) 69' (goal) 76'	Stadium: Hang Day Stadium; Attendance: 3.500; Referee: Hoàng Thanh Bình

11 April 2023 6 - Phase 1	Hoang Anh Gia Lai FC	1–1	Khanh Hoa FC	Pleiku, Gia Lai
17:00	Trần Đình Bảo 16'	Report	Jairo Rodrigues 46'	Stadium: Pleiku Stadium; Attendance: 9.000; Referee: Nguyễn Trung Kiên

15 April 2023 7 - Phase 1	Song Lam Nghe An	3–1	Hoang Anh Gia Lai FC	Vinh, Nghệ An
18:00	Michael Olaha 2'; Jordy Soladio 36'; Đinh Xuân Tiến 58'	Report	Paollo Madeira Oliveira 42' (pen.)	Stadium: Vinh Stadium; Attendance: 4000

19 May 2023 8 -Phase 1	Hoang Anh Gia Lai FC	2–2	Dong A Thanh Hoa	Pleiku, Gia Lai
17:00	Trần Minh Vương 23'; Đinh Thanh Bình 87'	Report	Paulo Conrado 59'; Bruno Cantanhede 77'	Stadium: Pleiku Stadium; Attendance: 6000; Referee: Nguyen Ngoc Chau

27 May 2023 9 - Phase 1	SHB Da Nang	–	Hoang Anh Gia Lai FC	Cẩm Lệ district, Đà Nẵng
17:00		Report		Stadium: Hoa Xuan Stadium

31 May 2023 10 -Phase 1	Hoang Anh Gia Lai FC	–	Hanoi FC	Pleiku, Gia Lai
17:00		Report		Stadium: Pleiku Stadium

4 June 2023 11 - Phase 1	Haiphong FC	–	Hoang Anh Gia Lai FC	Ngô Quyền district, Hải Phòng
19:15		Report		Stadium: Lach Tray Stadium

25 June 2023 12 - Phase 1	Hoang Anh Gia Lai FC	–	Ho Chi Minh City FC	Pleiku, Gia Lai
17:00		Report		Stadium: Pleiku Stadium

2 July 2023 13 - Phase 1	Topenland Binh Dinh	–	Hoang Anh Gia Lai FC	Quy Nhơn, Bình Định
17:00		Report		Stadium: Quy Nhơn Stadium

=== Vietnamese Cup ===
June 2023 1/8 Round	Hoang Anh Gia Lai FC	–	Becamex Binh Duong	Pleiku, Gia Lai
		Report		Stadium: Pleiku Stadium

== Stats ==
=== Thống kê đội hình ===
No.	Pos	Nat	Player	Total		V.League		National Cup	
No.	Pos	Nat	Player	Apps	Goals	Apps	Goals	Apps	Goals
Goalie
1	GK	(Vietnam) VIE	Duong Van Loi	3	0	3	0	0	0
18	GK	(Vietnam) VIE	Tran Trung Kien	0	0	0	0	0	0
25	GK	(Vietnam) VIE	Huynh Tuan Linh	4	0	4	0	0	0
Defender
2	DF	(Vietnam) VIE	Le Van Son	7	0	7	0	0	0
3	DF	(Vietnam) VIE	Le Van Dai	3	0	1+2	0	0	0
5	DF	(Vietnam) VIE	Nguyen Huu Anh Tai	1	0	1	0	0	0
23	DF	(Vietnam) VIE	Nguyen Thanh Nhan	7	0	6+1	0	0	0
27	DF	(Vietnam) VIE	Nguyen Van Trieu	1	0	0+1	0	0	0
44	DF	(Senegal) SEN	Papé Diakité	6	0	6	0	0	0
62	DF	(Vietnam) VIE	Phan Du Hoc	0	0	0	0	0	0
82	DF	(Vietnam) VIE	A Hoang	0	0	0	0	0	0
Midfielder
4	MF	(Vietnam) VIE	Chau Ngoc Quang	6	3	6	3	0	0
6	MF	(Vietnam) VIE	Tran Thanh Son	1	0	0+1	0	0	0
8	MF	(Vietnam) VIE	Tran Minh Vuong	7	1	4+3	1	0	0
11	MF	(Vietnam) VIE	Nguyen Tuan Anh	7	0	7	0	0	0
17	MF	(Vietnam) VIE	Vo Dinh Lam	1	0	0+1	0	0	0
20	MF	(Vietnam) VIE	Tran Bao Toan	5	0	5	0	0	0
24	MF	(Vietnam) VIE	Nguyễn Đức Việt	2	0	1+1	0	0	0
29	MF	(Vietnam) VIE	Au Duong Quan	0	0	0	0	0	0
34	MF	(Vietnam) VIE	Le Huu Phuoc	0	0	0	0	0	0
66	MF	(Vietnam) VIE	Tran Dinh Bao	2	1	1+1	1	0	0
86	MF	(Vietnam) VIE	Using Quang Nho	7	0	7	0	0	0
Striker
7	FW	(Portugal) POR	Paollo Madeira	7	3	7	3	0	0
9	FW	(Vietnam) VIE	Dinh Thanh Bình	5	0	2+3	0	0	0
12	FW	(Brazil) BRA	Washington Brandão	7	1	7	1	0	0
19	FW	(Vietnam) VIE	Nguyen Quoc Viet	4	1	0+4	1	0	0
28	FW	(Vietnam) VIE	Nguyen Van Anh	1	0	1	0	0	0
Mid-season transfer player
10	FW	(Vietnam) VIE	Le Minh Binh	0	0	0	0	0	0

Source: Competitions

=== Top goalscorers ===
#	Shirt numbers	Players	V.League 1	Vietnamese Cup	Total
1	4	(Vietnam) Châu Ngọc Quang	3	0	3
1	7	(Portugal) Paollo Madeira	3	0	3
2	12	(Brazil) Washington Brandão	1	0	1
2	8	(Vietnam) Trần Minh Vương	1	0	1
2	19	(Vietnam) Nguyễn Quốc Việt	1	0	1
2	66	(Vietnam) Trần Đình Bảo	1	0	1
Own goals			0	0	0
Total			10	0	10

#	Shirt number	Players	V.League 1	Vietnamese Cup	Total
1	8	(Vietnam) Trần Minh Vương	3	0	3
1	12	(Brazil) Washington Brandão	2	0	2
3	88	(Vietnam) Dụng Quang Nho	1	0	1
3	7	(Portugal) Paollo Madeira	1	0	1
Total			7	0	7

=== Clean sheets ===
#	Shirt	Players	V.League 1	Cup	Total
1	26	(Vietnam) Huỳnh Tuấn Linh	1	0	1
2	1	(Vietnam) Dương Văn Lợi	0	0	0
2	25	(Vietnam) Trần Trung Kiên	0	0	0
Total			1	0	1

=== Cards ===
#	Players	Shirt numbers	Pos	V.League 1		Vietnamese Cup		Total	
#	Players	Shirt numbers	Pos	Booked	Sent off (straight red)	Booked	Sent off (straight red)	Booked	Sent off (straight red)
1	(Senegal) Papé Diakité	44	HV	3				3	
1	(Vietnam) Châu Ngọc Quang	4	TV	3				3	
3	(Portugal) Paollo Oliveira	7	TĐ	1				1	
3	(Vietnam) Dụng Quang Nho	88	TV	1				1	
Tổng cộng				8	0	0	0	8	0
