= Trần Quang Thịnh =

Vietnamese footballer (born 2001)

Personal information
- Birth name: Trần Quang Thịnh
- Date of birth: 12 May 2001 (age 25)
- Place of birth: Dương Kinh, Hải Phòng, Vietnam
- Height: 1.80 m (5 ft 11 in)
- Position: Centre back

Team information
- Current team: Thép Cần Thơ
- Number: 71

Youth career
- 2011–2012: Viettel
- 2012–2019: Công An Nhân Dân

Senior career*
Years	Team	Apps	(Gls)
2019–2024	Công An Hà Nội	25	(0)
2024	→ Hoàng Anh Gia Lai (loan)	9	(0)
2024–2025	Thép Xanh Nam Định	2	(0)
2025–2026	Trường Tươi Đồng Nai	2	(0)
2026	Becamex Ho Chi Minh City	0	(0)
2026–	Thép Cần Thơ	2	(0)

International career^{‡}
2017–2018	Vietnam U17	3	(0)
2018–2019	Vietnam U19	4	(0)
2022–2024	Vietnam U23	21	(0)
Medal record
Men's football
Representing Vietnam
AFF U-23 Championship
Winner	Cambodia 2022	Team
SEA Games
Bronze medal – third place	Phnom Penh 2023	Team
- * Club domestic league appearances and goals as of 10 October 2026 ‡ National team caps and goals as of 1 April 2024

Trần Quang Thịnh (born 12 May 2001) is a Vietnamese professional footballer who plays as a centre back for V.League 2 club Thép Cần Thơ.

== Club career ==
=== Viettel ===
Quang Thịnh entered the youth academy of Viettel after passing the selection test of the academy in his hometown Haiphong. However, because he was deemed unfit for development and left Viettel youth academy in 2012.

=== Công An Nhân Dân/Công An Hà Nội ===
In 2012, through a physical education teacher, Quang Thịnh was introduced to participate in the entrance exam of Công An Nhân Dân youth academy. Quang Thịnh passed the exam and played for the youth team of the Ministry of Public Security before getting promoted to the first team in 2020. Quang Thịnh made his debut for the team in May 2022 in a V.League 2 match. Soon after the team changed its name to Công An Hà Nội in December 2022.

In the 2023 V.League 1 season, he won the league title with Công An Hà Nội without making any appearance.

=== Loan spell to LPBank HAGL ===
In February 2024, Quang Thịnh joined V.League 1 fellow LPBank HAGL on a loan deal until the end of the season.

=== Thép Xanh Nam Định ===
On 30 August 2024, Thép Xanh Nam Định announced their signature of Quang Thịnh to the team.

=== Thép Cần Thơ ===
In September 2026, Quang Thịnh signed for V.League 2 club Thép Cần Thơ.

== International career ==
Quang Thịnh was named to the Vietnam U23 squad for the 2022 AFF U-23 Championship. Alongside Nguyễn Thanh Nhân, he was the two players with the game time in the team during the tournament, both performed brilliantly to help Vietnam U23 win the tournament. Therefore, Quang Thịnh and Thanh Nhân were also named in the Team of the Tournament.

After his impressive performances at the 2022 AFF U-23 Championship, Quang Thịnh was called up again to the Vietnam U23 team by coach Park Hang-seo to prepare for 31st SEA Games. Quang Thịnh was included preliminary squad but wasn't named in the final squad list.

== Career statistics ==
As of 9 April 2023

Club	Season	League			National Cup		Total	
Club	Season	Division	Appearance	Goal	Appearance	Goal	Appearance	Goal
Công An Hà Nội	2022	V.League 2	11	0	1	0	12	0
Công An Hà Nội	2023	V.League 1	0	0	0	0	0	0
Total			11	0	1	0	12	0

== Honours ==
Công An Hà Nội

- V.League 1: 2023
- V.League 2: 2022

Thép Xanh Nam Định

- V.League 1: 2024–25

Trường Tươi Đồng Nai

- V.League 2: 2025–26

Vietnam U23

- AFF U-23 Championship: 2022
- SEA Games bronze medal: 2023

Individual

- AFF U-23 Championship Team of the Tournament: 2022
