= Paollo Madeira =

Brazilian footballer (1996–2023)

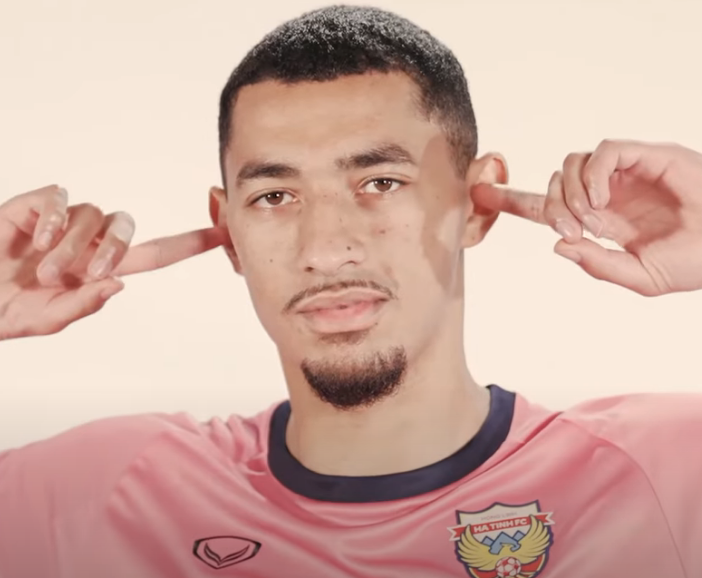
- Paollo in 2022

Personal information
- Full name: Paollo Madeira Oliveira
- Date of birth: 8 July 1996
- Place of birth: Santos, São Paulo, Brazil
- Date of death: 12 August 2023 (aged 27)
- Place of death: Chư Pưh, Gia Lai, Vietnam
- Height: 1.89 m (6 ft 2 in)
- Position: Forward

Youth career
- –2013: Imortal

Senior career*
Years	Team	Apps	(Gls)
2014–2015	Quarteirense		
2015	Imortal		
2019–2022	Farense	13	(2)
2020	→ Estrela (loan)	11	(3)
2022	→ Hồng Lĩnh Hà Tĩnh (loan)	25	(8)
2023	Hoàng Anh Gia Lai	15	(6)
Total		64	(19)
- * Club domestic league appearances and goals

Paollo Madeira Oliveira (8 July 1996 – 12 August 2023), simply known as Paollo, was a Brazilian professional footballer who played as a forward.

== Life ==
=== Early life ===
Paollo was born on 8 July 1996 in Santos, São Paulo, Brazil and moved to Portugal when he was 8.

== Career ==
Before arriving in Vietnam, he had played for several clubs in Portugal.

=== Hồng Lĩnh Hà Tĩnh ===
Paollo joined V.League 1 club Hồng Lĩnh Hà Tĩnh, on loan from S.C. Farense before 2022 season. He made 25 appearances and scored 8 goals, helping his team to be safe from relegation.

=== Hoàng Anh Gia Lai ===
Paollo left Hà Tĩnh for Hoàng Anh Gia Lai prior to the 2023 season. Before his death, he played 15 matches and scored 6 goals in the league.

=== Statistics ===
Appearances and goals by club, season and competition
Club	Season	League			National cup		League Cup		Continental		Other		Total	
Club	Season	Division	Apps	Goals	Apps	Goals	Apps	Goals	Apps	Goals	Apps	Goals	Apps	Goals
Farense U23	?	Liga Revelação U-23	7	2	–		–		–		–		7	2
Estrela Amadora (loan)	2020–21	Primeira Liga	4	0	7	3	–		–		–		11	3
Farense	2021–22	Liga Portugal 2	5	0	–		1	0	–		–		6	0
Hồng Lĩnh Hà Tĩnh	2022	V.League 1	23	8	2	0	–		–		–		25	8
Hoàng Anh Gia Lai	2023	V.League 1	15	6	–		–		–		–		15	6
Career total			54	16	9	3	1	0	–		–		64	19

== Death ==
After the final match of the 2023 season against Sông Lam Nghệ An at Vinh Stadium, due to not being able to find a direct flight back to Pleiku, the HAGL squad was forced to fly to Buôn Ma Thuột, Đắk Lắk. Paollo, alongside team doctor Đào Trọng Trí and assistant coach Dương Minh Ninh, went by car to Pleiku, but when passing through Chư Pưh district on National Highway 14, the car came into the path of two trucks and was forcefully sandwiched between them. All three occupants, including Paollo, were unable to escape and did not survive the accident.

HAGL helped Paollo's family bring his body back to his final resting place in Portugal. Paollo is survived by his wife, Tammy Araújo Chaves.
