= Huỳnh Tiến Đạt =

Vietnamese footballer

Personal information
- Full name: Huỳnh Tiến Đạt
- Date of birth: 26 January 2000 (age 26)
- Place of birth: Bình Định, Vietnam
- Height: 1.68 m (5 ft 6 in)
- Position: Winger

Team information
- Current team: Hồng Lĩnh Hà Tĩnh
- Number: 20

Youth career
- –2019: Hoàng Anh Gia Lai

Senior career*
Years	Team	Apps	(Gls)
2019–2022	Hoàng Anh Gia Lai	1	(0)
2019	→ Phố Hiến (loan)	12	(5)
2020	→ Công An Hà Nội (loan)	12	(6)
2021	→ Phố Hiến (loan)	6	(0)
2022	→ Công An Hà Nội (loan)	6	(0)
2023–2024	Quy Nhơn Bình Định	20	(1)
2024	Becamex Bình Dương	10	(0)
2024–	Hồng Lĩnh Hà Tĩnh	40	(1)

International career
2017	Vietnam U19	1	(0)
2019–2022	Vietnam U23	3	(0)
Medal record
Men's football
Representing Vietnam
AFF U-23 Championship
Winner	Cambodia 2022	Team
- * Club domestic league appearances and goals as of 7 June 2026

Huỳnh Tiến Đạt (born 26 January 2000) is a Vietnamese professional footballer who plays as a winger for V.League 1 team Hồng Lĩnh Hà Tĩnh.

== Club career ==
Born in Bình Định, Tiến Đạt was a youth product of the Hoàng Anh Gia Lai academy. He began his professional career with Phố Hiến in the V.League 2, where he was loaned in 2019. He then joined Second Division club Công An Nhân Dân, where he was team captain for the 2020 season.

In the middle of the 2022 season, Tiến Đạt returned to Công An Nhân Dân on loan and help the club win the 2022 V.League 2.

In January 2023, Tiến Đạt was transferred to his hometown club Bình Định. After the year at the club, he moved to league fellow Becamex Bình Dương.

After being released by Becamex Bình Dương, Tiến Đạt joined Hồng Lĩnh Hà Tĩnh, signing a two-year contract. Here, he became an important player of the club.

== International career ==
Initially not called up for the 2022 AFF U-23 Championship, Tiến Đạt was added to squad after several players withdrew due for being COVID-19 positive. He appeared in 3 games in the tournament and won the tournament with Vietnam U23.

== Honours ==
Công An Nhân Dân

- V.League 2: 2022

Vietnam U23

- AFF U-23 Championship: 2022
