= Chư Pưh district =

Coordinates: 13°35′55″N 108°05′22″E

Chư Pưh district Huyện Chư Pưh
- District
- Interactive map of Chư Pưh district
- Country: Vietnam
- Region: Central Highlands
- Province: Gia Lai province
- Capital: Nhơn Hòa

Area
  - Total: 286.92 sq mi (743.12 km^{2})

Population (31/12/2024)
  - Total: 94,828
  - Density: 330.50/sq mi (127.61/km^{2})
- Time zone: UTC+7 (Indochina Time)

Chư Pưh is a rural district (huyện) of Gia Lai province in the Central Highlands region of Vietnam. It was established in 2009 with the split of Chư Sê District's territory into Chư Pưh District in the southern half and the new Chư Sê district in the northern half. The district's name comes from native languages and is misspelled in Vietnamese orthography.

Chư Pưh district is subdivided into Nhơn Hòa township and the communes of: Chư Don, Ia Dreng, Ia Hrú, Ia Rong, Ia Hla, Ia Le, Ia Blứ and Ia Phang.
