= Nazif Safwan Jaini =

Bruneian footballer

Nazif Safwan
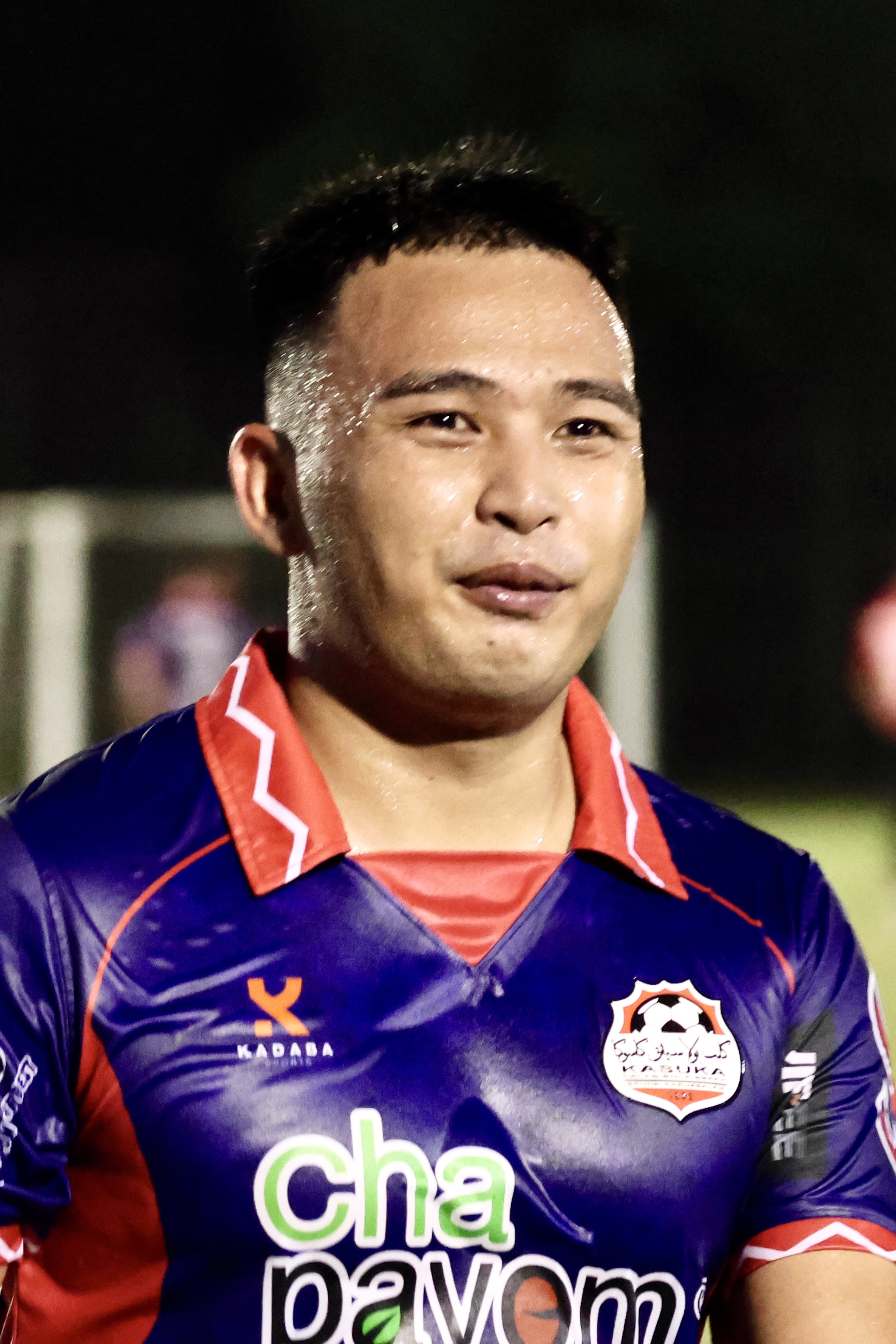
- Nazif with Kasuka in 2024

Personal information
- Full name: Muhammad Nazif Safwan bin Jaini
- Date of birth: 18 August 2000 (age 26)
- Place of birth: Brunei
- Positions: Defender; midfielder

Youth career
- 2015–2018: Tabuan Muda

Senior career*
Years	Team	Apps	(Gls)
2016–2018	Tabuan Muda		(1)
2018–2019	Kasuka		
2019–2020	DPMM II		
2021–2023	Kota Ranger		(3)
2024–	Kasuka	7	(0)

International career^{‡}
2015–2016	Brunei U16	9	(0)
2015–2018	Brunei U19	11	(0)
2020–2022	Brunei U23	7	(0)
2022–2024	Brunei	2	(0)
- * Club domestic league appearances and goals as of 25 November 2025 ‡ National team caps and goals as of 20 September 2024

Muhammad Nazif Safwan bin Jaini (born 18 August 2000) is a Bruneian footballer who plays as a defender or midfielder for Kasuka of the Brunei Super League.

== Club career ==
As a youngster, Nazif was a prospect under Tabuan Muda, the league team of youth international players set up by the National Football Association of Brunei Darussalam (NFABD) and had represented Brunei in various age categories since 2015. He scored his first league goal on 28 January 2018 against Lun Bawang FC in a 3–3 draw. He then signed for the second team of DPMM FC of the Singapore Premier League which established a youthful squad to challenge the domestic league in 2019. The team comfortably won the league in February 2019.

Nazif moved to Kota Ranger FC at the start of the 2021 Brunei Super League. He scored on his debut in a 4–0 win against Setia Perdana on 20 June. The team were head-to-head with DPMM FC in the league after six games when it was cancelled for the second year running due to the COVID-19 pandemic. The following year, Nazif aided his club to the semi-finals of the 2022 Brunei FA Cup where they were beaten 0–3 on aggregate to the eventual winners, DPMM FC.

In the 2023 Brunei Super League, Nazif scored against both Kuala Belait and Rimba Star before leaving the club midway through the season to join the Royal Brunei Armed Forces. A year later, he signed for domestic powerhouses Kasuka FC and made his debut in a 9–0 win against Lun Bawang FC on 1 September 2024.

== International career ==
=== Youth ===
Nazif regularly partnered Wafi Aminuddin in central defence throughout the various Brunei youth teams that they played together. Their first assignment was the 2015 AFF U-16 Youth Championship held in Cambodia where they drew 2–2 with Timor-Leste in the first game on 26 July. Although they suffered four defeats at the rest of the tournament, the players that impressed including Nazif were drafted into the under-19s for the 2016 AFC U-19 Championship qualification matches in Myanmar the following September. Nazif took the field in three games, all ending in defeats.

A return to Cambodia for the 2016 AFF U-16 Youth Championship the following year was in the books for Nazif, who was ever-present for the Young Wasps. The team failed to gain a single point from encounters with Timor-Leste, Cambodia, Thailand and Laos.

In September 2017, Nazif laced up with the under-19s for the 2017 AFF U-18 Youth Championship held in Myanmar. Despite a 3–2 win over the Young Azkals in the first match, Brunei suffered heavy defeats against Vietnam, Myanmar and Indonesia. Nazif subsequently did not travel with the squad for the 2018 AFC U-19 Championship qualification phase in South Korea a month later.

Nazif travelled with the Brunei under-19 squad for the 2018 AFF U-19 Youth Championship in Indonesia that July. He was ever-present partnering Wafi for all four matches as Brunei left East Java without gaining any points.

In March 2019, Nazif was selected for the Brunei under-23 team to compete at the 2020 AFC U-23 Championship qualification matches hosted by Vietnam. In the first match against the hosts, the Young Wasps suffered a 6–0 drubbing, followed by a crushing 8–0 defeat to Thailand. These two matches were Nazif's only involvement of the tournament. Later in the year, he made four appearances at the 2019 SEA Games football tournament in a largely forgettable campaign where Brunei failed to even score a goal.

Nazif was announced to be joining the under-23 squad for the 2022 AFF U-23 Championship hosted by Cambodia in February. He only made one appearance in the tournament which was a second-half substitute for Abdul Hariz Herman in a 1–3 defeat to Timor-Leste.

=== Senior ===
Nazif's first involvement with the full national team was at a training camp in June 2023. He was then selected for the first ever FIFA Series in March 2024 hosted by Saudi Arabia. He made his first full appearance for the Wasps on 22 March against Bermuda, replacing Nurikhwan Othman in the second half in a 0–2 defeat. The following match against Vanuatu four days later, Nazif was also brought on by Mario Rivera in the second half when Hakeme Yazid Said smashed home an injury time freekick for a 3–2 victory against their first-ever OFC opponents.

== Honours ==
Kasuka FC

- Brunei Super League: 2024–25
