= Phan Bá Quyền =

Vietnamese footballer

Personal information
- Full name: Phan Bá Quyền
- Date of birth: 17 February 2002 (age 24)
- Place of birth: Yên Thành, Nghệ An, Vietnam
- Height: 1.75 m (5 ft 9 in)
- Positions: Defensive midfielder; defender

Team information
- Current team: Sông Lam Nghệ An
- Number: 19

Youth career
- 2020–2022: Sông Lam Nghệ An

Senior career*
Years	Team	Apps	(Gls)
2020–	Sông Lam Nghệ An	54	(3)
2020	→ Đồng Nai (loan)		
2022	→ Hải Nam Vĩnh Yên (loan)		
2022–2023	→ Bình Phước (loan)	13	(1)

International career
2022	Vietnam U23	1	(0)
Medal record
Men's football
Representing Vietnam
AFF U-23 Championship
Winner	Cambodia 2022	Team
- * Club domestic league appearances and goals as of 7 June 2026

Phan Bá Quyền (born 17 February 2002) is a Vietnamese professional footballer who plays as a defensive midfielder or defender for V.League 1 club Sông Lam Nghệ An.

== Club career ==
Born in Nghệ An, Bá Quyền was formed at the local Sông Lam Nghệ An academy. In 2022, he joined Vietnamese Second Division side Hải Nam Vĩnh Yên on a loan deal. After the championship ended, he signed for Bình Phước for the second part of the 2022 V.League 2 season. He appeared in 11 games for the team as they managed to avoid relegation at the end of the season. As a result, his loan deal was extended for another season. On 18 April 2023, Bình Phước controversaly released Bá Quyền's contract after he conceded a penalty, causing the team to lose to Hoa Bình in a league game.

In the following season, Bá Quyền returned to Sông Lam Nghệ An and quickly gained a starter spot due to his versatility. He appeared in 20 games for the club and scored a goal in the 2023–24.

== International career ==
In 2022, Bá Quyền took part in the Vietnam U23's triumph in the 2022 AFF U-23 Championship.

== Playing style ==
Bá Quyền began his career as a center-back, but due to his short height for the position, follow by his good passing ability, he was repositioned to several positions such as defensive midfielder or full back.

== Honours ==
Vietnam U23

- AFF U-23 Championship: 2022
