= Đoàn Anh Việt =

Vietnamese footballer (born 1999)

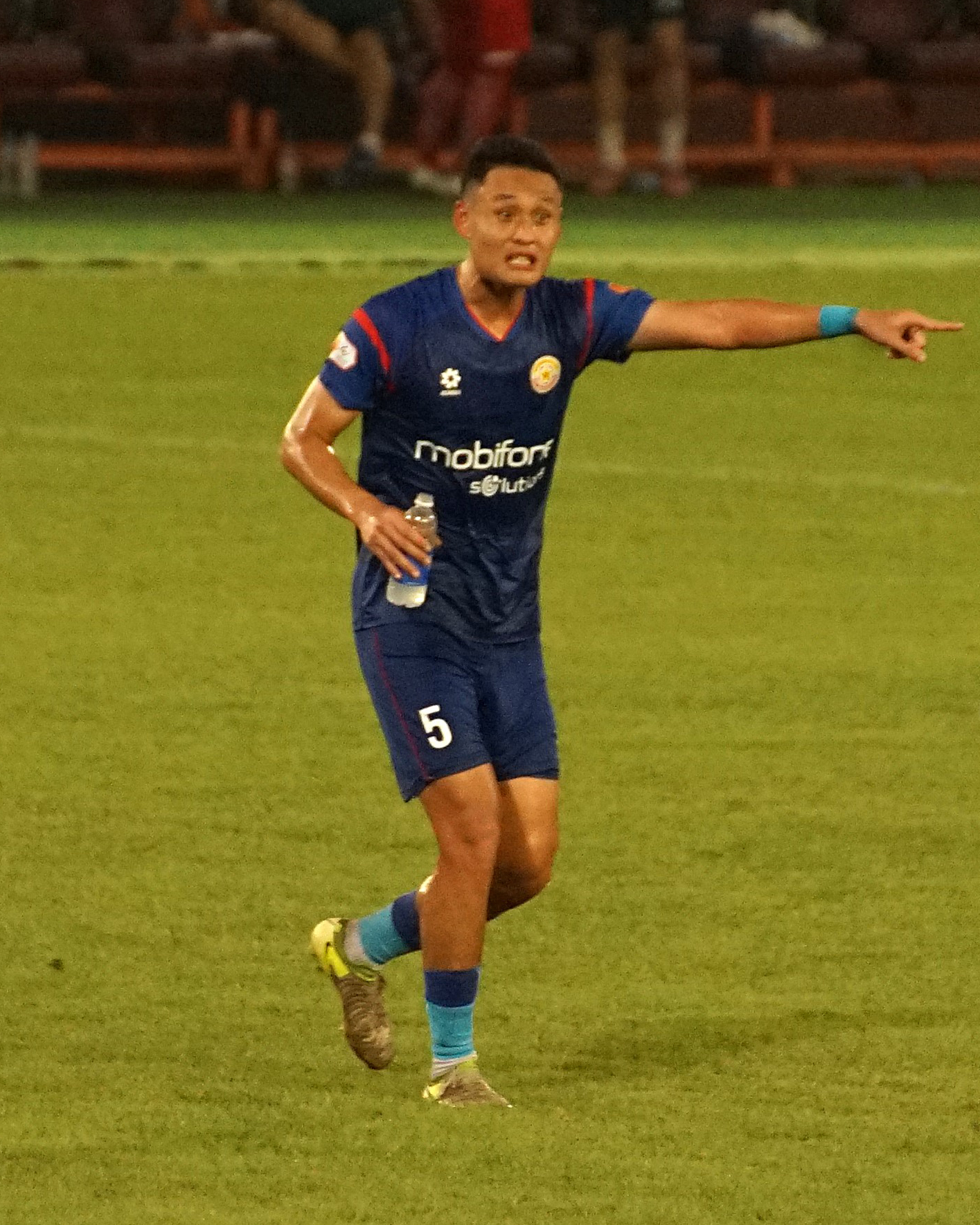
- Anh Việt in 2026

Personal information
- Full name: Đoàn Anh Việt
- Date of birth: 15 August 1999 (age 27)
- Place of birth: Hải Phòng, Vietnam
- Height: 1.86 m (6 ft 1 in)
- Position: Centre back

Team information
- Current team: Công An Nhân Dân
- Number: 5

Youth career
- 2012–2018: Than Quảng Ninh

Senior career*
Years	Team	Apps	(Gls)
2018–2021	Than Quảng Ninh	9	(0)
2018	→ Lâm Đồng (loan)		
2019	→ Đắk Lắk (loan)		
2020	→ Hồng Lĩnh Hà Tĩnh (loan)	0	(0)
2020	→ Đắk Lắk (loan)	4	(0)
2021–2022	Sài Gòn	7	(0)
2023–2024	Becamex Bình Dương	1	(0)
2023–2024	→ Trường Tươi Bình Phước (loan)	7	(1)
2024	Đồng Tháp	9	(0)
2024–2025	SHB Đà Nẵng	3	(0)
2025–	Công An Nhân Dân	11	(0)

International career
2021–2022	Vietnam U23	6	(0)
Medal record
Men's football
Representing Vietnam
AFF U-23 Championship
Winner	Cambodia 2022	Team
- * Club domestic league appearances and goals as of 12 June 2026

Đoàn Anh Việt (born 15 August 1999) is a Vietnamese professional footballer who plays as a centre back for V.League 2 club Công An Nhân Dân.

== Club career ==
Born in Hải Phòng, Anh Việt started playing football at en early age. Because his city doesn't have any football academy, he had to travel to the neighbor province Quảng Ninh to join the youth team of Than Quảng Ninh. After several loan spells at lower-tier clubs such as Lâm Đồng and Đắk Lắk, he was registered in Than Quảng Ninh's squad for the 2021 V.League 1 season and had made 9 appearances. At the end of the season, the club was in financial difficulties and was dissolved.

In November 2021, Anh Việt joined Sài Gòn, signing a three-year contract. He appeared in 7 matches for the club throughout the season as they finish last in the league and suffer relegation. Aftermath, the club cease operations and Anh Việt was released.

In 2023, he joined Becamex Bình Dương as a free agent but was released after one season at the club, making only one appearance.

In October 2024, Anh Việt joined V.League 2 side Trường Tươi Bình Phước. He scored his first career goal in his team's 2–2 league draw against SHB Đà Nẵng.

In March 2024, Anh Việt signed for V.League 2 fellow Đồng Tháp.

== International career ==
In February 2022, following the forfeit of the players that were tested positive for COVID-19, Anh Việt was additionally called up to the Vietnam U23 squad for the 2022 AFF U-23 Championship. He appeared in the semi-final against Timor-Leste where he was given the captain's armband, and then in the final against Thailand where he managed to keep a clean sheet in a 1–0 victory to win the title.

Later in the year, he featured in the 2022 AFC U-23 Asian Cup, making one appearance in the group stage.

== Honours ==
Vietnam U23

- AFF U-23 Championship: 2022
