= Ivan Ouano =

Filipino footballer

Personal information
- Full name: Marcel Ivan Arcenal Ouano
- Date of birth: March 6, 2000 (age 26)
- Place of birth: Cebu City, Philippines
- Height: 1.78 m (5 ft 10 in)
- Position: Forward

Team information
- Current team: Maharlika
- Number: 17

College career
Years	Team	Apps	(Gls)
2019–2020	National University		

Senior career*
Years	Team	Apps	(Gls)
2020–2022	Azkals Development Team		
2022–2023	United City	11	(0)
2023–2024	Cebu	9	(2)
2024	United City	14	(1)
2024–2025	Loyola	16	(0)
2025–	Maharlika	8	(1)

International career
2016–2017	Philippines U17	8	(0)
2017–2018	Philippines U19	6	(0)
2019–2023	Philippines U23	4	(2)
- * Club domestic league appearances and goals

Marcel Ivan Arcenal Ouano (born March 6, 2000) is a Filipino professional footballer who plays as a forward for Philippines Football League club Maharlika.

== Collegiate career ==
Ouano played for the football team of his college, National University in the UAAP.

== Club career ==
=== Azkals Development Team ===
In 2020, he joined the Azkals Development Team, a guest team in the Philippines Football League mainly composed of the Philippines international youth players. He made his league debut for ADT in a 1–0 defeat against the defending champions United City.

=== United City ===
After his 2-year stint with ADT, Ouano joined United City. He scored his first goal for the club in a 4–0 win against Maharlika Manila in the 2022 Copa Paulino Alcantara. A week later, he scored his second goal in a 4–0 win against his former club ADT.

On 15 April 2022, Ouano made his AFC Champions League debut in a 0–1 defeat against Jeonnam Dragons, coming in as a substitute replacing Ricardo Sendra at the 83rd minute of the match.

== International career ==
=== Philippines U17 ===
In 2016, Ouano was included in the 23-man squad for the 2016 AFF U-16 Youth Championship held in Phnom Penh, Cambodia. He made his debut for the Philippines U16 in a 1–0 defeat against Singapore U17.

=== Philippines U19 ===
In 2017, Ouano was called up to represent the Philippines U19 in the 2017 AFF U-19 Youth Championship. He made his debut for the Philippines U19 in a 3–2 defeat against Brunei U19.

=== Philippines U23 ===
Ouano was named in the reserves list of the Philippines U-22 squad that competed in the 2019 Southeast Asian Games held in the Philippines. In 2021, Ouano was included in the 23-man squad for the 2022 AFC U-23 Asian Cup qualification matches against South Korea, Singapore and Timor Leste. He made his debut for the Philippines U23 in a 1–0 defeat against Singapore U23, coming in as a substitute replacing Mark Winhoffer at the 59th minute. Ouano scored his first and second goal for the Philippines U23 in a 2–2 draw against Timor Leste U23 in the 2022 AFF U-23 Youth Championship held in Cambodia.

== Career statistics ==
=== Club ===
As of 21 April 2022.

Club	Season	League			Cup		Continental		Other		Total	
Club	Season	Division	Apps	Goals	Apps	Goals	Apps	Goals	Apps	Goals	Apps	Goals
ADT	2020	PFL	3	0	Cancelled		0	0	0	0	3	0
ADT	2021	PFL	Cancelled		3	0	0	0	0	0	3	0
United City	2022	PFL	0	0	4	2	2	0	0	0	6	2
Career total			3	0	7	2	2	0	0	0	12	2
