= Chanapach Buaphan =

Thai footballer (born 2004)

Personal information
- Full name: Chanapach Buaphan
- Date of birth: 22 March 2004 (age 22)
- Place of birth: Lopburi, Thailand
- Height: 1.95 m (6 ft 5 in)
- Position: Centre-back

Team information
- Current team: BG Pathum United
- Number: 89

Youth career
- 2017–2021: Assumption College Sriracha

Senior career*
Years	Team	Apps	(Gls)
2021–	BG Pathum United	34	(0)
2021–2022	→ Rajpracha (loan)	16	(0)
2022	→ Lamphun Warriors (loan)	4	(0)
2025	→ Nara Club (loan)	0	(0)

International career^{‡}
2018–2019	Thailand U16	9	(1)
2022	Thailand U19	10	(1)
2022–	Thailand U23	19	(2)
Medal record
Men's football
Representing Thailand
SEA Games
Silver medal – second place	Hanoi 2021	Team
Silver medal – second place	Bangkok 2025	Team
AFF U-23 Championship
Runner-up	Cambodia 2022
- * Club domestic league appearances and goals as of 9 January 2026 ‡ National team caps and goals as of 1 February 2026

Chanapach (or Chonnaphat) Buaphan (Thai: ชนภัช บัวพันธ์, born 22 March 2004) is a Thai professional footballer who plays as a centre-back for Thai League 1 club BG Pathum United.

== Club career ==
Chanapach comes from the BG Pathum United youth team and was on loan at Rajpracha during the 2021–22 season. He made his debut on 4 September 2021 in an away game against Chainat Hornbill. Here the defender was in the starting XI and played the full 90 minutes in a 1–1 draw. Overall, he completed 16 league games there while on loan and one game in the Thai League Cup.

In the 2022–23 season, Chanapach was loaned to the Lamphun Warriors. He played four first division games for the club from Lamphun. After the loan, he returned to BG at the end of December 2022.

In January 2025, Chanapach signed a 1-year loan contract to J3 league club Nara Club. But after 6 months, as a result of his health issue abnormalities associated with polycystic kidney disease (a hereditary condition) were detected during a medical check-up. With a further operation required, Nara Club and Chanapach mutually agreed to terminate his contract. He returned to BG Pathum United in June 2025.

== International career ==
On 16 February 2022, Chanapach made his first four appearances for the Thailand U-23 national team during the 2022 AFF U-23 Championship in Cambodia. With the selection he lost in the final Vietnam 0–1 and was able to achieve second place.

== Honours ==
=== Club ===
==== BG Pathum United ====
- Thai League Cup: 2023–24

=== International ===
Thailand U23

- Southeast Asian Games (silver) Silver medal: 2021, 2025

=== Individual ===
- AFF U-23 Championship Team of the Tournament: 2022
