= Nguyễn Ngọc Thắng =

Vietnamese footballer (born 2002)

Personal information
- Birth name: Nguyễn Ngọc Thắng
- Date of birth: 2 August 2002 (age 24)
- Place of birth: Kỳ Anh, Hà Tĩnh, Vietnam
- Height: 1.78 m (5 ft 10 in)
- Position: Centre back

Youth career
- 2013–2020: Hồng Lĩnh Hà Tĩnh

Senior career*
Years	Team	Apps	(Gls)
2020–2024	Hồng Lĩnh Hà Tĩnh	24	(0)
2022	→ Long An (loan)	16	(0)

International career^{‡}
2022–2024	Vietnam U23	17	(1)
Medal record
Men's football
Representing Vietnam
AFF U-23 Championship
Winner	Cambodia 2022	Team
Winner	Thailand 2023
SEA Games
Bronze medal – third place	Phnom Penh 2023	Team
- * Club domestic league appearances and goals as of 4 April 2024 ‡ National team caps and goals as of 3 May 2023

Nguyễn Ngọc Thắng (born 2 August 2002) is a Vietnamese professional footballer who plays as a centre back.

In May 2024, Ngọc Thắng was arrested for illegal drug use in Hà Tĩnh and was later sentenced to four years in prison.

== Club career ==
Born in Hà Tĩnh, Ngọc Thắng was admitted to the youth team of Hồng Lĩnh Hà Tĩnh in 2013 after his performances during a local tournament. He was promoted to Hồng Lĩnh Hà Tĩnh's first team for the 2020 V.League 1 season but didn't make any appearances.

In 2021, Ngọc Thắng was loaned to Nutifood-JMG and won the 2021 Vietnamese National U-21 Championship as his team's main centre back.

On 13 February 2023, Ngọc Thắng made his professional debut, starting in Hồng Lĩnh Hà Tĩnh's 2–3 V.League 1 defeat against defending champions Hà Nội.

== International career ==
Ngọc Thắng was named to the Vietnam national under-23 team squad for the 2022 AFF U-23 Championship. He played in the opening game against Singapore before getting replaced in the squad for being tested positive for COVID-19. His teammates later secured the title after the 1–0 against Thailand in the final.

In April 2022, Ngọc Thắng was selected by coach Philippe Troussier to participate in the 2023 Southeast Asian Games with Vietnam under-22.

In April 2024, Ngọc Thắng was named in Vietnam U23's squad for the AFC U-23 Asian Cup 2024. He was sent-off in his first match against Kuwait and conceded his team a penalty.

== Personal life ==
Ngọc Thắng idolizes Vietnam national team captain Quế Ngọc Hải.

=== Arrest and sentence ===
On 4 May 2024, Ngọc Thắng and four other teammates at Hồng Lĩnh Hà Tĩnh were arrested at a hotel in Hà Tĩnh on drug-related charges. The Vietnam Football Federation immediately suspended these players from all football activities and Hồng Lĩnh Hà Tĩnh also removed them from the squad. In the trial held on 27 August 2024, the People's Court of Hà Tĩnh sentenced Ngọc Thắng to 4 years in prison for the illegal use of drugs.

== Honours ==
Nutifood JMG Academy

- Vietnamese National U-21 Football Championship: 2021

Vietnam U23

- AFF U-23 Championship: 2022, 2023
- SEA Games: Bronze medal: (bronze) 2023
