= Hồ Khắc Lương =

Vietnamese footballer (born 2001)

Personal information
- Full name: Hồ Khắc Lương
- Date of birth: 10 January 2001 (age 25)
- Place of birth: Quỳnh Lưu, Nghệ An, Vietnam
- Height: 1.72 m (5 ft 8 in)
- Positions: Center-back; defensive midfielder

Team information
- Current team: Sông Lam Nghệ An
- Number: 15

Youth career
- 2018–2021: Sông Lam Nghệ An

Senior career*
Years	Team	Apps	(Gls)
2021–	Sông Lam Nghệ An	19	(0)
2021	→ Phù Đổng (loan)	6	(0)

International career
2019–2020	Vietnam U19	7	(0)
2022–2023	Vietnam U23	2	(0)
Medal record
Men's football
Representing Vietnam
AFF U-23 Championship
Winner	Cambodia 2022	Team
- * Club domestic league appearances and goals as of 7 June 2026

Hồ Khắc Lương (born 10 January 2001) is a Vietnamese professional footballer who plays as a center-back or defensive midfielder for V.League 1 club Sông Lam Nghệ An.

== Club career ==
Born in Nghệ An, Khắc Lương is a youth product of the local Sông Lam Nghệ An academy. In 2021, he was loaned to Phù Đổng and made his debut at the 2021 V.League 2.

In first game of the 2023–24 V.League 1 against Hồng Lĩnh Hà Tĩnh, Khắc Lương suffered from an anterior cruciate ligament injury, and missed the rest of the season.

== International career ==
Khắc Lương featured in the 2019 AFF U-18 Youth Championship, held in his home country Vietnam and appeared in all 4 games as his team got elimated from the group stage.

In February 2022, Khắc Lương was additionally called up to the Vietnam U23's squad for the 2022 AFF U-23 Championship. He played in the semi-final and the final game, as Vietnam won the tournament.

== Honours ==
Vietnam U23

- AFF U-23 Championship: 2022
