= Nguyễn Thanh Khôi =

Vietnamese footballer

Personal information
- Full name: Nguyễn Thanh Khôi
- Date of birth: November 18, 2001 (age 24)
- Place of birth: Huế, Vietnam
- Height: 1.65 m (5 ft 5 in)
- Position: Midfielder

Team information
- Current team: Becamex Hồ Chí Minh City
- Number: 6

Youth career
- 2013–2020: Hoàng Anh Gia Lai
- 2020–2022: Nutifood

Senior career*
Years	Team	Apps	(Gls)
2021–2022	Nutifood	0	(0)
2022	→ Long An (loan)	16	(2)
2023–2025	Hồ Chí Minh City	45	(0)
2023	→ Bà Rịa-Vũng Tàu (loan)	9	(0)
2025–2026	Bắc Ninh	20	(0)
2026–	Becamex Hồ Chí Minh City	1	(0)

International career^{‡}
2019–2020	Vietnam U19	6	(1)
2022–2024	Vietnam U23	2	(1)
Medal record
Men's football
Representing Vietnam
AFF U-23 Championship
Winner	Cambodia 2022	Team
- * Club domestic league appearances and goals as of 20 September 2026 ‡ National team caps and goals as of 28 March 2024

Nguyễn Thanh Khôi (born 18 November 2001) is a Vietnamese professional footballer who plays as a midfielder for V.League 2 club Becamex Hồ Chí Minh City.

== Early career ==
Born in Huế, Thanh Khôi started youth career at the age of 13 after he was admitted to the Hoang Anh Gia Lai – Arsenal JMG Academy. In 2019, he was sent to train with the under-17 side of Feyenoord during a short period. At the same year he captained Hoàng Anh Gia Lai U19 to the Vietnamese National U-19 Championship final but failed to win the title after losing to Hà Nội.

In 2020, Thanh Khôi was transferred to the Nutifood JMG Academy, a partner club of Hoàng Anh Gia Lai. He was part of the U-21 Nutifood squad that won the 2021 Vietnamese National U-21 Championship.

== Club career ==
In 2022, Thanh Khôi joined V.League 2 side Long An on a loan deal from Nutifood. He scored 2 goals after 16 league appearances for the team.

In November 2022, after Nutifood was handed over to Hồ Chí Minh City, Thanh Khôi signed for the V.League 1 team.

In June 2023, Thanh Khôi was loaned to Bà Rịa-Vũng Tàu until the end of the 2023 season.

In July 2026, Thanh Khôi signed for Becamex Hồ Chí Minh City.

== International career ==
Khôi took part in the 2022 AFF U-23 Championship with Vietnam U23. He played in the opening game against Singapore and scored a goal in the 7–0 win. After the game, he was tested positive for COVID-19 and forfeited for the rest of the tournament. His teammates later secured the title after defeating Thailand in the final.

== Honours ==
Vietnam U23

- AFF U-23 Championship: 2022
