= Hul Kimhuy =

Cambodian footballer

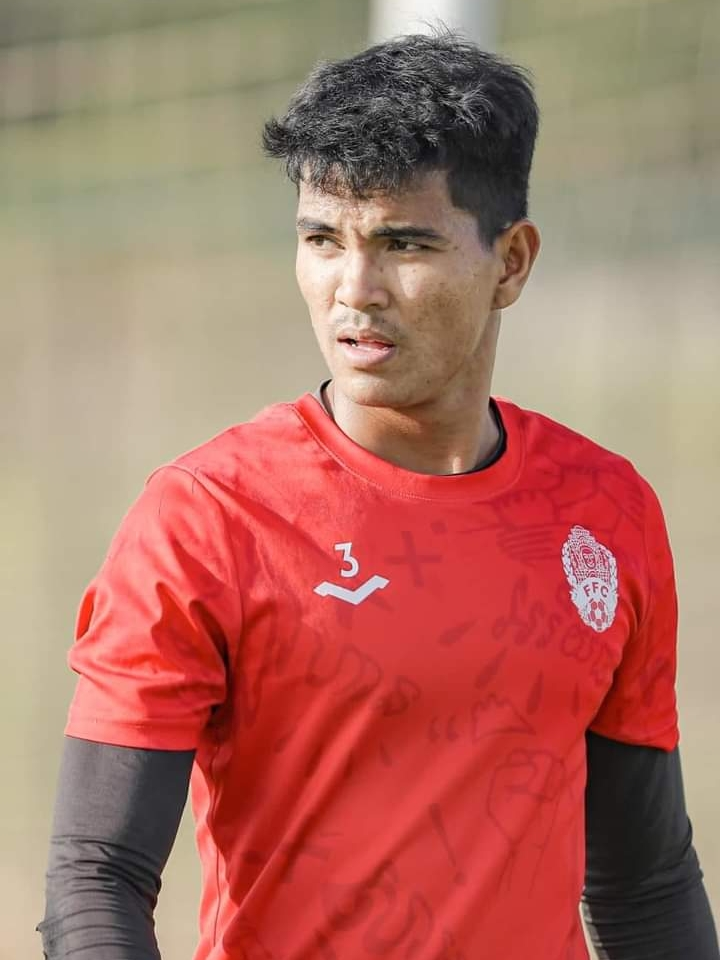

Personal information
- Full name: Hul Kimhuy
- Date of birth: 7 April 2000 (age 26)
- Place of birth: Takéo Province, Cambodia
- Height: 1.82 m (6 ft 0 in)
- Position: Goalkeeper

Team information
- Current team: ISI Dangkor Senchey
- Number: 1

Youth career
- 2015–2018: Bati Academy

Senior career*
Years	Team	Apps	(Gls)
2018–2022	Boeung Ket		
2023–	Visakha	39	(0)
2026–	→ ISI Dangkor Senchey (loan)	5	(0)

International career^{‡}
2019–2022	Cambodia U23	6	(0)
2019–	Cambodia	23	(0)
- * Club domestic league appearances and goals as of 10 November 2026 ‡ National team caps and goals as of 19 August 2026

Hul Kimhuy (Khmer: ហ៊ុល គឹមហ៊ុយ; born 7 April 2000) is a Cambodian professional footballer who plays as goalkeeper for Cambodian Premier League club ISI Dangkor Senchey on loan from Visakha and the Cambodia national football team.

== Club career ==
Hul Kimhuy joined Boeung Ket in 2018 and made his senior debut in the Cambodian League on 16 March 2019 against Phnom Penh Crown. He left Boeung Ket at the end of 2022 season.

In 2023, Kimhuy joined Visakha.

On 30 June 2026, Kimhuy joined ISI Dangkor Senchey a season loan from Visakha.

== International career ==
Kimhuy made his debut in the 2020 AFC U-23 Championship qualification against Australia on 22 March 2019.

== Honours ==
Boeung Ket

- Cambodian Premier League: 2020

=== Individual ===
- Cambodian Premier League Golden gloves: 2020
- AFF U-23 Championship Best Goalkeeper: 2022
- AFF U-23 Championship Team of the Tournament: 2022
