= Chư Pưh =

Chư Pưh Xã Chư Pưh
- Commune
- Chư Pưh commune
- Location within Vietnam
- Coordinates: 13°32′48″N 108°05′59″E
- Country: Vietnam
- Region: Central Highlands
- Province: Gia Lai
- Time zone: UTC+7 (UTC + 7)

Chư Pưh is a commune (xã) of Gia Lai Province, Vietnam.

On June 16, 2025, the Standing Committee of the National Assembly issued Resolution No. 1660/NQ-UBTVQH15 on the reorganization of commune-level administrative units in Gia Lai Province in 2025 (the resolution took effect on the date of its adoption). Accordingly, the entire natural area and population of Nhơn Hòa Township, Chư Don Commune, and Ia Phang Commune were consolidated to establish a new commune named Chư Pưh Commune.
