= Sin Sovannmakara =

Cambodian footballer

Personal information
- Full name: Sin Sovannmakara
- Date of birth: 6 December 2004 (age 21)
- Place of birth: Kandal, Cambodia
- Height: 1.75 m (5 ft 9 in)
- Position: Defensive midfielder

Team information
- Current team: Visakha
- Number: 88

Youth career
- Phnom Penh Crown
- Visakha

Senior career*
Years	Team	Apps	(Gls)
2021–2022	Prey Veng		
2023–	Visakha	65	(2)
2023–2024	Visakha B	5	(0)

International career^{‡}
2021–2025	Cambodia U23		
2021–	Cambodia	8	(0)
- * Club domestic league appearances and goals as of 9 November 2026 ‡ National team caps and goals as of 19 August 2026

Sin Sovannmakara (born 6 December 2004) is a Cambodian professional footballer who plays as a defensive midfielder for Cambodian Premier League club Visakha and the Cambodia national team. He is younger brother of Sin Kakada who is currently playing for Visakha.

== Honours ==
=== Individual ===
- AFF U-23 Championship Team of the Tournament: 2022
