= Dụng Quang Nho =

Vietnamese footballer (born 2000)

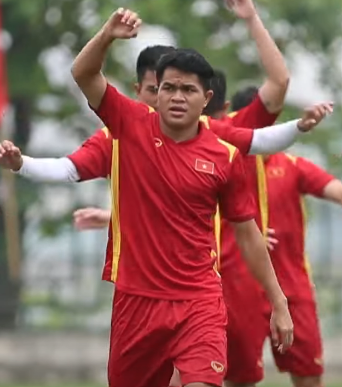
- Dụng Quang Nho in 2022

Personal information
- Full name: Dụng Quang Nho
- Date of birth: 1 January 2000 (age 26)
- Place of birth: Bắc Bình, Bình Thuận, Vietnam
- Height: 1.71 m (5 ft 7 in)
- Positions: Right-back; defensive midfielder

Team information
- Current team: Ninh Bình
- Number: 86

Youth career
- 2010–2018: Hoàng Anh Gia Lai

Senior career*
Years	Team	Apps	(Gls)
2019–2025	Hoàng Anh Gia Lai	80	(3)
2022	→ Hải Phòng (loan)	13	(0)
2025–	Ninh Bình	23	(2)

International career^{‡}
2018–2020	Vietnam U19	11	(0)
2021–2022	Vietnam U23	11	(1)
Medal record
Men's football
Representing Vietnam
AFF U-23 Championship
Winner	Cambodia 2022
SEA Games
Gold medal – first place	Hanoi 2021	Team
- * Club domestic league appearances and goals as of 7 June 2026 ‡ National team caps and goals as of 27 February 2022

Dụng Quang Nho (born 1 January 2000) is a Vietnamese professional footballer who plays as a right-back or midfielder for V.League 1 club Ninh Bình. He is of Cham ethnicity.

== International goals ==
=== U-19 ===
#	Date	Venue	Opponent	Score	Result	Competition
1.	8 November 2017	Zhubei, Taiwan	Laos	2–0	4–0	2018 AFC U-19 Championship qualification

=== U-23 ===
#	Date	Venue	Opponent	Score	Result	Competition
1.	19 February 2022	Phnom Penh, Cambodia	Singapore	4–0	7–0	2022 AFF U-23 Youth Championship

== Honours ==
Vietnam U-23

- AFF U-23 Championship: 2022
- SEA Games gold medal: 2021
