= Narong Kakada =

Cambodian footballer

Personal information
- Full name: Narong Kakada
- Date of birth: 5 July 1999 (age 27)
- Place of birth: Battambang Province, Cambodia
- Height: 1.70 m (5 ft 7 in)
- Positions: Forward; attacking midfielder

Team information
- Current team: Preah Khan Reach Svay Rieng
- Number: 45

Senior career*
Years	Team	Apps	(Gls)
2018–2023	Tiffy Army		
2023–	Preah Khan Reach Svay Rieng	33	(2)

International career^{‡}
2019	Cambodia U-23		
2019–	Cambodia	2	(0)
- * Club domestic league appearances and goals as of 22 September 2026 ‡ National team caps and goals as of 17:03, 11 January 2022 (UTC)

Narong Kakada (born 5 July 1999), is a Cambodian professional footballer currently playing as a forward or an attacking midfielder for Preah Khan Reach Svay Rieng in the Cambodian Premier League, and the Cambodia national team.
