= Trần Bảo Toàn =

Vietnamese footballer

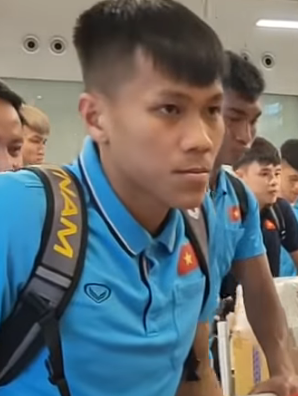
- Bảo Toàn in 2020

Personal information
- Full name: Trần Bảo Toàn
- Date of birth: 14 July 2000 (age 26)
- Place of birth: Quảng Ngãi, Vietnam
- Height: 1.69 m (5 ft 7 in)
- Position: Midfielder

Team information
- Current team: Ninh Bình
- Number: 15

Youth career
- 2010–2018: Hoàng Anh Gia Lai

Senior career*
Years	Team	Apps	(Gls)
2018–2025	Hoàng Anh Gia Lai	100	(2)
2025–	Ninh Bình	18	(2)

International career^{‡}
2018–2020	Vietnam U19	8	(0)
2020–2022	Vietnam U23	6	(1)
Medal record
Men's football
Representing Vietnam
AFF U-23 Championship
Winner	Cambodia 2022
- * Club domestic league appearances and goals as of 7 June 2026 ‡ National team caps and goals as of 6 March 2025

Trần Bảo Toàn (born 14 July 2000) is a Vietnamese professional footballer who is a midfielder for V.League 1 club Ninh Bình.

== International career ==
=== Vietnam U–19 ===
In 2018, he was summoned by coach Hoang Anh Tuan to Vietnam U19 to attend the 2018 AFF U-19 Youth Championship in Indonesia. Bao Toan was then called up to the International U19 Championship in Qatar and then the 2018 AFC U-19 Championship.

=== Vietnam U–23 ===
At the 2022 AFF U-23 Championship, Bao Toan was in the "reinforcement group" added to the team after a series of players of the team received positive results for COVID-19. The guy and 3 other teammates even had to travel overland through Cambodia by bus. Bao Toan scored the only goal to help U23 Vietnam beat Thailand U23 in the final to win the championship.

== International goals ==
=== Vietnam U19 ===
No.	Date	Venue	Opponent	Score	Result	Competition
1.	8 November 2017	Zhubei, Taiwan	Laos	1–0	4–0	2018 AFC U-19 Championship qualification

=== U-23 ===
No.	Date	Venue	Opponent	Score	Result	Competition
1.	26 February 2022	Phnom Penh, Cambodia	Thailand	1–0	1–0	2022 AFF U-23 Youth Championship

== Honours ==
Vietnam U23

- AFF U-23 Championship: 2022
