= Nguyễn Thanh Nhân =

Vietnamese footballer

Personal information
- Full name: Nguyễn Thanh Nhân
- Date of birth: 25 October 2000 (age 26)
- Place of birth: Long Xuyên, An Giang, Vietnam
- Height: 1.68 m (5 ft 6 in)
- Position: Left-back

Team information
- Current team: Hoàng Anh Gia Lai
- Number: 7

Youth career
- 2014–2021: Hoàng Anh Gia Lai

Senior career*
Years	Team	Apps	(Gls)
2020	→ Đồng Nai (loan)		
2022–	Hoàng Anh Gia Lai	89	(2)

International career^{‡}
2022	Vietnam U23	6	(0)
2022	Vietnam	2	(1)
Medal record
Men's football
Representing Vietnam
AFF U-23 Championship
Winner	Cambodia 2022
- * Club domestic league appearances and goals as of 7 June 2026 ‡ National team caps and goals as of 25 September 2022

Nguyễn Thanh Nhân (born 25 October 2000) is a Vietnamese professional footballer who plays as a left-back for V.League 1 club Hoàng Anh Gia Lai.

== Club career ==
A graduate from Hoang Anh Gia Lai – Arsenal JMG Academy, Thanh Nhân was promoted to the first team in 2022 to become Nguyễn Phong Hồng Duy's back-up at the left-back position. He made his first league debut on 7 February 2022 in the 1–1 draw Topenland Bình Định. On 28 April 2022, Thanh Nhân had his first AFC Champions League appearance in the 0–2 defeat against Japanese side Yokohama F. Marinos, replacing Nguyễn Công Phượng in the 54th minute.

== International career ==
In February 2022, due to numerous COVID-19 cases within the Vietnam U23 squad, Thanh Nhân and 9 other players were additionally called up to the team for the 2022 AFF U-23 Championship in Cambodia. He played two matches in total during the tournament, including the 1–0 against Thailand in group stage and the semi-final victory against Timor Leste, in which he scored the winning penalty to help U23 Vietnam win 5–3 in the penalty shoot-out. His teammates secured the title by defeating Thailand 1–0 again in the final.

In June 2022, Gong Oh-kyun named Thanh Nhân in the Vietnam U23's squad for the 2022 AFC U-23 Asian Cup in Uzbekistan. Thanh Nhân played in the 3 matches during the tournament and had an assist in the group stage match against Malaysia with a cross to help Nhâm Mạnh Dũng headed the opener.

Thanh Nhân made his senior level debut on 25 September 2022 against Singapore in the 2022 VFF Tri-Nations Series. He substituted Phan Tuấn Tài in the 46th minute and scored his first international goal just 5 minutes after. The match ended in a 4–0 win for Vietnam.

== Career statistics ==
=== Club ===
As of match played 7 June 2026

Appearances and goals by club, season and competition
Club	Season	League			National cup		Continental		Other		Total	
Club	Season	Division	Apps	Goals	Apps	Goals	Apps	Goals	Apps	Goals	Apps	Goals
Hoàng Anh Gia Lai	2022	V.League 1	13	0	1	0	1 (Note: Appearances in AFC Champions League)	0	—		15	0
Hoàng Anh Gia Lai	2023	V.League 1	14	0	0	0	—		—		14	0
Hoàng Anh Gia Lai	2023–24	V.League 1	22	1	1	0	—		—		23	1
Hoàng Anh Gia Lai	2024–25	V.League 1	15	0	1	0	—		—		16	0
Hoàng Anh Gia Lai	2025–26	V.League 1	25	1	2	0	—		—		27	1
Career total			89	2	5	0	1	0	0	0	95	2

=== International ===
As of match played 24 September 2022

Appearances and goals by national team and year
National team	Year	Apps	Goals
Vietnam
Vietnam	2022	2	1
Total		2	1

Scores and results list Vietnam's goal tally first, score column indicates score after each Nhàn goal.

International goals by date, venue, cap, opponent, score, result and competition
No.	Date	Venue	Cap	Opponent	Score	Result	Competition
1	21 September 2022	Thống Nhất Stadium, Ho Chi Minh City, Vietnam	1	Singapore	2–0	4–0	2022 VFF Tri-Nations Series

== Honours ==
Vietnam U23

- AFF U-23 Championship: 2022

Vietnam

- VFF Cup: 2022

Individual

- AFF U-23 Championship Team of the Tournament: 2022
