= 2022 AFF U-23 Championship =

AFF U-23 Championship Cambodia 2022

Tournament details
- Host country: Cambodia
- Dates: 14–26 February
- Teams: 9 (from 1 sub-confederation)
- Venues: 2 (in 1 host city)

Final positions
- Champions: Vietnam (1st title)
- Runners-up: Thailand
- Third place: Timor-Leste; Laos

Tournament statistics
- Matches played: 14
- Goals scored: 39 (2.79 per match)
- Attendance: 79,653 (5,690 per match)
- Top scorer: (Thailand) Teerasak Poeiphimai (3 goals)
- Best player: (Laos) Bounphachan Bounkong
- Best goalkeeper: (Cambodia) Hul Kimhuy

The 2022 AFF U-23 Championship was the 3rd edition of the AFF U-23 Championship, organised by the ASEAN Football Federation (AFF) and held amidst the COVID-19 pandemic in Phnom Penh, the capital of Cambodia, from 14 to 26 February 2022.

Indonesia were the defending champions, having won the 2019 edition also on Cambodian soil, but they and Myanmar withdrew entirely after several players and officials from both sides tested positive for COVID-19.

Despite having their squad decimated by both the virus and injuries, Vietnam conquered the U-23 regional crown for the first time after defeating Thailand 1–0 in the final. Additionally, Laos and Timor-Leste made their maiden semi-final appearances, though both ended in defeat – a third place play-off between them never came about because COVID-19 had ruled out several Laotian players.

== Qualified teams ==
There was no qualification, and all entrants advanced to the final tournament. The following teams from member associations of the AFF entered the tournament:

Team	Association	Appearance	Previous best performance
Brunei	FA Brunei Darussalam	1st	Debut
Cambodia	FF Cambodia	3rd	Fourth place (2019)
Laos	Lao FF	2nd	Group stage (2005)
Malaysia	FA Malaysia	3rd	Fourth place (2005)
Philippines	Philippine FF	3rd	Group stage (2005, 2019)
Singapore	FA Singapore	2nd	Runners-up (2005)
Thailand	FA Thailand	2nd	Champions (2005)
Timor-Leste	FF Timor-Leste	3rd	Group stage (2005, 2019)
Vietnam	Vietnam FF	2nd	Third place (2019)

Did not enter
Australia

Withdrew
Indonesia
Myanmar

== Draw ==
The draw for the 2022 AFF U-23 Championship was held on 29 December 2021 at the Goodwood Park Hotel in Singapore.

== Squads ==
A final squad of 23 players (three of whom must be goalkeepers) must be registered one day before the first match of the tournament.

== Match officials ==
- (Singapore) Zulfiqar Mustaffa
- (Cambodia) Khoun Virak
- (Brunei) Abdul Hakim Mohd Haidi
- (Indonesia) Yudi Nurcahya
- (Laos) Souei Vongkham
- (Malaysia) Tuan Yaasin Hanafiah
- (Thailand) Warintorn Sassadee
- (Vietnam) Ngô Duy Lân

== Venues ==
Phnom Penh
Morodok Techo National Stadium	Prince Stadium
Capacity: 60,000	Capacity: 15,000

== Group stage ==
All times are local, ICT (UTC+7).

=== Group A ===
Pos	Team	Pld	W	D	L	GF	GA	GD	Pts	Qualification
1	Timor-Leste	3	2	1	0	6	3	+3	7	Knockout stage
2	Cambodia (H)	3	2	0	1	7	1	+6	6	
3	Philippines	3	1	1	1	4	4	0	4	
4	Brunei	3	0	0	3	2	11	−9	0	

Source: AFF
Rules for classification: 1) points; 2) head-to-head; 3) goal difference; 4) goals scored; 5) penalty shoot-out; 6) disciplinary points; 7) drawing of lots.
(H) Hosts
14 February 2022
16:00

Timor-Leste	2–2	Philippines
Mouzinho 7' (pen.); Soares 55'	Report	Ouano 45', 63'

Morodok Techo National Stadium, Phnom Penh
Attendance: 540
Referee: Souei Vongkham (Laos)
14 February 2022
19:00

Cambodia	6–0	Brunei
Chanthea 18'; Sosidan 21'; Ty 32'; Bunchhai 72'; Rotana 86'; Kakada 88'	Report

Morodok Techo National Stadium, Phnom Penh
Attendance: 24,587
Referee: Tuan Yaasin Hanafiah (Malaysia)

17 February 2022
16:00

Brunei	1–3	Timor-Leste
Hakeme 17'	Report	Mouzinho 30'; Gali 45+2'; Wafi 81' (o.g.)

Morodok Techo National Stadium, Phnom Penh
Attendance: 2,357
Referee: Ngô Duy Lân (Vietnam)
17 February 2022
19:00

Philippines	0–1	Cambodia
	Report	Sovannmakara 81'

Morodok Techo National Stadium, Phnom Penh
Attendance: 17,080
Referee: Warintorn Sassadee (Thailand)

20 February 2022
19:00

Cambodia	0–1	Timor-Leste
	Report	Safy 18' (o.g.)

Morodok Techo National Stadium, Phnom Penh
Attendance: 25,307
Referee: Zulfiqar Mustaffa (Singapore)
20 February 2022
19:00

Philippines	2–1	Brunei
Chung 48'; Reyes 58'	Report	Hakeme 59'

Prince Stadium, Phnom Penh
Attendance: 285
Referee: Souei Vongkham (Laos)

=== Group B ===
After the withdrawal of Indonesia and Myanmar from the tournament due to several of their players testing positive for COVID-19, the two remaining teams will play against each other twice. The winners will qualify for the knockout stage, while the losers will be eliminated.

Pos	Team	Pld	W	D	L	GF	GA	GD	Pts	Qualification
1	Laos	2	2	0	0	4	1	+3	6	Knockout stage
2	Malaysia	2	0	0	2	1	4	−3	0	
3	Myanmar (Note: Myanmar withdrew hours before their first match, due to multiple players tested positive for COVID-19.)	0	0	0	0	0	0	0	0	Withdrew
4	Indonesia (Note: Indonesia withdrew from the tournament on 11 February 2022 because seven players tested positive for COVID-19, four others were categorised as suspected COVID-19 cases and three players suffered injuries.)	0	0	0	0	0	0	0	0	Withdrew

Source: AFF
Rules for classification: 1) points; 2) head-to-head; 3) goal difference; 4) goals scored; 5) penalty shoot-out; 6) disciplinary points; 7) drawing of lots.
Notes:
18 February 2022
16:00

Laos	2–1	Malaysia
Bounphachan 56'; Phetdavanh 79'	Report	Selvan 45+2'

Prince Stadium, Phnom Penh
Attendance: 316
Referee: Abdul Hakim Mohd Haidi (Brunei)

21 February 2022
19:00

Malaysia	0–2	Laos
	Report	Bounphachan 43'; Souksakhone 86'

Morodok Techo National Stadium, Phnom Penh
Attendance: 75
Referee: Warintorn Sassadee (Thailand)

=== Group C ===
Pos	Team	Pld	W	D	L	GF	GA	GD	Pts	Qualification
1	Vietnam	2	2	0	0	8	0	+8	6	Knockout stage
2	Thailand	2	1	0	1	3	2	+1	3	Knockout stage
3	Singapore	2	0	0	2	1	10	−9	0	

Source: AFF
Rules for classification: 1) points; 2) head-to-head; 3) goal difference; 4) goals scored; 5) penalty shoot-out; 6) disciplinary points; 7) drawing of lots.
16 February 2022
19:00

Thailand	3–1	Singapore
Teerasak 45', 62'; Niphitphon 57'	Report	Ilhan 16'

Prince Stadium, Phnom Penh
Attendance: 570
Referee: Yudi Nurcahya (Indonesia)
19 February 2022
19:00

Singapore	0–7	Vietnam
	Report	Nguyễn Văn Tùng 3', 37'; Đinh Xuân Tiến 32'; Dụng Quang Nho 56'; Nguyễn Ngọc Thắng 78'; Nguyễn Thanh Khôi 89'; Vũ Tiến Long 90+5'

Prince Stadium, Phnom Penh
Attendance: 1,100
Referee: Khoun Virak (Cambodia)
22 February 2022
19:00

Vietnam	1–0	Thailand
Nguyễn Trung Thành 29'

Prince Stadium, Phnom Penh
Attendance: 1,845
Referee: Tuan Yaasin Hanafiah (Malaysia)

== Ranking of second-placed teams ==
Only one second-placed team will qualify for the semi-finals.

Due to Indonesia and Myanmar's withdrawals, Group B is left with only two teams. Thus, the second-placed team from Group B will not be included to determine the best runner-up team.

Result against fourth-placed team in Group A was not considered for this ranking.

Pos	Grp	Team	Pld	W	D	L	GF	GA	GD	Pts	Qualification
1	C	Thailand	2	1	0	1	3	2	+1	3	Knockout stage
2	A	Cambodia (H)	2	1	0	1	1	1	0	3	

Source: AFF
Rules for classification: 1) points; 2) goal difference; 3) goals scored; 4) disciplinary points; 5) drawing of lots.
(H) Hosts

== Knockout stage ==
In the knockout stage, the penalty shoot-out was used to decide the winner if necessary.

=== Bracket ===
Semi-finals
24 February – Phnom Penh
Laos	0
Thailand	2
24 February – Phnom Penh
Timor-Leste	0 (3)
Vietnam (p)	0 (5)

Final
26 February – Phnom Penh
Thailand	0
Vietnam	1
Third Place
26 February – Phnom Penh
Laos
Timor-Leste	w/o (Note: Timor-Leste won by walkover as several Laotian players tested positive for COVID-19 before the match, forcing Laos to withdraw.)

=== Semi-finals ===
24 February 2022
16:00

Laos	0–2	Thailand
	Report	Teerasak 14'; Kroekphon 52' (pen.)

Morodok Techo National Stadium, Phnom Penh
Attendance: 100
Referee: Yudi Nurcahya (Indonesia)
24 February 2022
19:30

Timor-Leste	0–0 (a.e.t.)	Vietnam
	Report
Penalties
Filomeno (penalty scored); Orcelio (penalty scored); Gumario (penalty scored); Firth (penalty missed)	3–5	(penalty scored) Trần Quang Thịnh; (penalty scored) Hồ Khắc Lương; (penalty scored) Vũ Đình Hai; (penalty scored) Trần Bảo Toàn; (penalty scored) Nguyễn Thanh Nhân

Morodok Techo National Stadium, Phnom Penh
Attendance: 1,256
Referee: Tuan Yaasin Hanafiah (Malaysia)

=== Third place match ===
26 February 2022
16:00

Laos	Cancelled	Timor-Leste

Morodok Techo National Stadium, Phnom Penh

=== Final ===
26 February 2022
19:30

Thailand	0–1	Vietnam
	Report	Trần Bảo Toàn 45'

Morodok Techo National Stadium, Phnom Penh
Attendance: 4,235
Referee: Khoun Virak (Cambodia)

== Statistics ==
=== Winners ===
2022 AFF U-23 Championship winners

Vietnam
First title

=== Awards ===
Most Valuable Player	Top Scorer Award	Best Goalkeeper Award
(Laos) Bounphachan Bounkong	(Thailand) Teerasak Poeiphimai	(Cambodia) Hul Kimhuy

=== Team of the Tournament ===
Goalkeeper	Defenders	Midfielders	Forwards
(Cambodia) Hul Kimhuy	(Thailand) Thawatchai Inprakhon; (Thailand) Chonnapat Buaphan; (Timor-Leste) Jaimito Soares; (Vietnam) Trần Quang Thịnh	(Timor-Leste) Mouzinho; (Laos) Bounphachan Bounkong; (Cambodia) Sin Sovannmakara; (Philippines) Sandro Reyes; (Vietnam) Nguyễn Thanh Nhân	(Thailand) Teerasak Poeiphimai

=== Goalscorers ===
There were 39 goals scored in 14 matches, for an average of 2.79 goals per match.

3 goals

- (Thailand) Teerasak Poeiphimai

2 goals

- (Brunei) Hakeme Yazid Said
- (Laos) Bounphachan Bounkong
- (Philippines) Ivan Ouano
- (Timor-Leste) Mouzinho
- (Vietnam) Nguyễn Văn Tùng

1 goal

- (Cambodia) Narong Kakada
- (Cambodia) Nhean Sosidan
- (Cambodia) Sa Ty
- (Cambodia) Sin Sovannmakara
- (Cambodia) Sieng Chanthea
- (Cambodia) Sor Rotana
- (Cambodia) Taing Bunchhai
- (Laos) Souksakhone Bouaphaivanh
- (Laos) Phetdavanh Somsanith
- (Malaysia) Selvan Anbualagan
- (Philippines) Dennis Chung
- (Philippines) Sandro Reyes
- (Singapore) Ilhan Fandi
- (Thailand) Kroekphon Abram
- (Thailand) Niphitphon Wongpanya
- (Timor-Leste) Paulo Gali
- (Timor-Leste) Jaimito Soares
- (Vietnam) Đinh Xuân Tiến
- (Vietnam) Dụng Quang Nho
- (Vietnam) Nguyễn Ngọc Thắng
- (Vietnam) Nguyễn Thanh Khôi
- (Vietnam) Nguyễn Trung Thành
- (Vietnam) Trần Bảo Toàn
- (Vietnam) Vũ Tiến Long

1 own goal

- (Brunei) Wafi Aminuddin (against Timor-Leste)
- (Cambodia) Yue Safy (against Timor-Leste)

=== Final ranking ===
This table shows the ranking of teams throughout the tournament.

Pos	Team	Pld	W	D	L	GF	GA	GD	Pts	Final result
1	Vietnam	4	3	1	0	9	0	+9	10	Champions
2	Thailand	4	2	0	2	5	3	+2	6	Runners-up
3	Timor-Leste	4	2	2	0	6	3	+3	8	Third place (Note: Originally, the third place was awarded automatically to Timor Leste, but the country proposed for the third place to be awarded to Laos as well. The proposal was accepted by the ASEAN Football Federation.)
4	Laos	3	2	0	1	4	3	+1	6	Third place
5	Cambodia (H)	3	2	0	1	7	1	+6	6	Eliminated in the group stage
6	Philippines	3	1	1	1	4	4	0	4	Eliminated in the group stage
7	Malaysia	2	0	0	2	1	4	−3	0	Eliminated in the group stage
8	Brunei	3	0	0	3	2	11	−9	0	Eliminated in the group stage
9	Singapore	2	0	0	2	1	10	−9	0	Eliminated in the group stage

Source: Group stage, Knockout stage
(H) Hosts

== Broadcasting rights ==
Territory	Rights holder(s)	Ref.
Brunei	Radio Television Brunei	
Indonesia; Timor Leste	SCTV (free TV); Champions TV (pay TV); Vidio (OTT)	
Malaysia	Astro; Media Prima	
Myanmar; Laos	FPT Telecom	
Singapore	Football Association of Singapore (via social media channels)	
Thailand	True Visions	
Vietnam	FPT Telecom; VTV	
