= 2023 AFF U-23 Championship final =

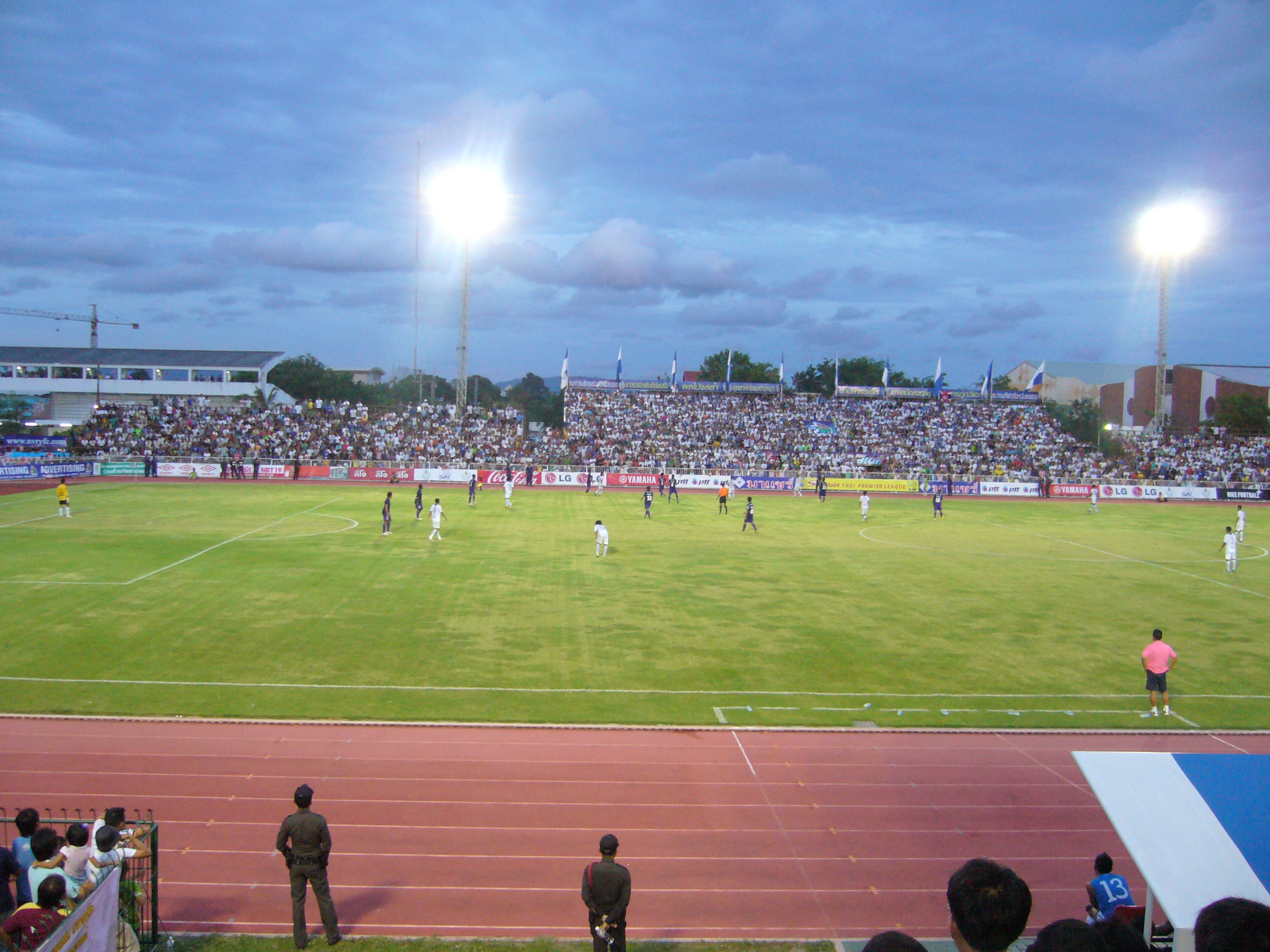
- Rayong Province Stadium in Rayong hosted the final.
- Event: 2023 AFF U-23 Championship
| Vietnam | Indonesia |
| (Vietnam) | (Indonesia) |
| 0 | 0 |
- After extra time Vietnam won 6–5 on penalties
- Date: 26 August 2023
- Venue: Rayong Province Stadium, Rayong
- Man of the Match: Ernando Ari (Indonesia)
- Referee: Hiroki Kasahara (Japan)
- Attendance: 1,542
- Weather: Good; 30 °C (86 °F); 78% humidity

The 2023 AFF U-23 Championship final was a football match that took place on 26 August 2023 at Rayong Province Stadium in Rayong, Indonesia, to determine the winners of the 2023 AFF U-23 Championship. The match was contested by defending champions Vietnam and Indonesia, which met in the final for the first time.

Vietnam won the match after the penalties shootout to achieve their second consecutive ASEAN U-23 Championship and their second title.

Goalkeeper Ernando Ari, the only player who missed his take during the penalty shootout, was named player of the match in the aftermath.

== Route to the final ==
=== Vietnam ===
Vietnam's route to the final
| Match | Opponent | Result |
|---|---|---|
| 1 | Laos | 1–4 |
| 2 | Philippines | 1–0 |
| SF | Malaysia | 1–4 |

=== Indonesia ===
Indonesia's route to the final
| Match | Opponent | Result |
|---|---|---|
| 1 | Malaysia | 2–1 |
| 2 | Timor-Leste | 1–0 |
| SF | Thailand | 1–3 |

== Match details ==
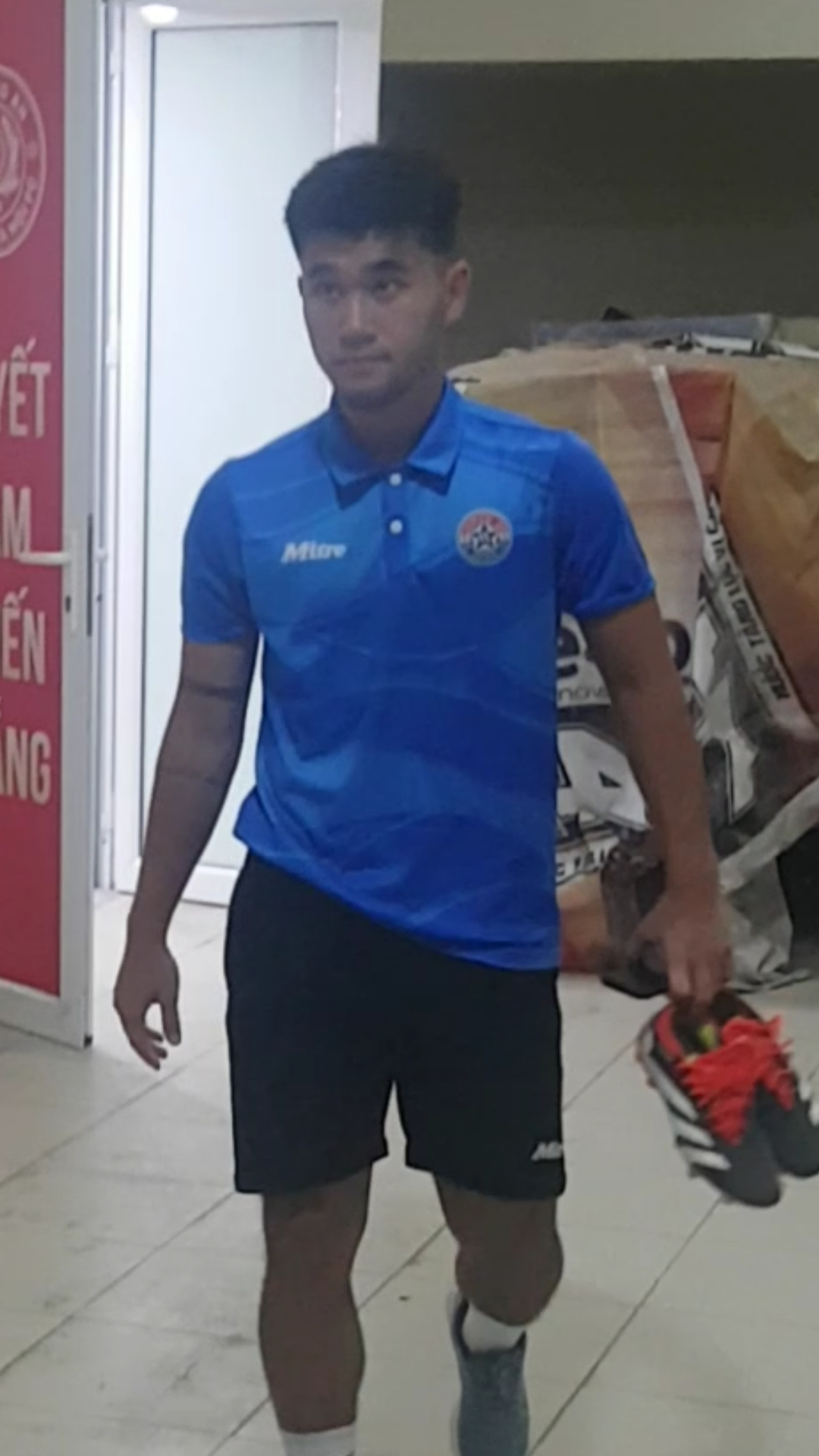
Thái Bá Đạt, the player who scored the winning penalty.

26 August 2023
20:00

| Vietnam | 0–0 (a.e.t.) | Indonesia |
|---|---|---|
| | Report |
Penalties
| Nguyễn Đức Việt (penalty scored); Đinh Xuân Tiến (penalty scored); Lê Nguyên Hoàng (penalty scored); Trần Nam Hải (penalty scored); Lương Duy Cương (penalty scored); Thái Bá Đạt (penalty scored) | 6–5 | (penalty scored) Dewangga; (penalty scored) Arkhan; (penalty scored) Frengky; (penalty scored) Sroyer; (penalty scored) Sananta; (penalty missed) Ernando |

Rayong Province Stadium, Rayong
Attendance: 1,542
Referee: Hiroki Kasahara (Japan)

| Vietnam | Indonesia |

| GK | 1 | Quan Văn Chuẩn (c) |
| CB | 3 | Lương Duy Cương |
| CB | 4 | Nguyễn Ngọc Thắng | (yellow card) 56' | (substituted off) 91' |
| CM | 6 | Trần Nam Hải |
| RM | 8 | Nguyễn Đức Việt | (yellow card) 54' |
| RM | 9 | Đinh Xuân Tiến | (yellow card) 54' |
| CM | 10 | Khuất Văn Khang | (yellow card) 36' | (substituted off) 79' |
| CM | 15 | Nguyễn Minh Quang | (yellow card) 75' | (substituted off) 114' |
| LM | 16 | Võ Hoàng Minh Khoa | | (substituted off) 79' |
| AM | 22 | Phạm Đình Duy | | (substituted off) 91' |
| CF | 14 | Nguyễn Quốc Việt | | (substituted off) 91' |
Substitutions:
| DF | 5 | Lê Nguyên Hoàng | | (substituted on) 91' |
| MF | 12 | Lê Đình Long Vũ | | (substituted on) 91' |
| MF | 13 | Nguyễn Đăng Dương | | (substituted on) 79' |
| MF | 18 | Thái Bá Đạt | | (substituted on) 114' |
| MF | 19 | Nguyễn Phi Hoàng | | (substituted on) 91' |
| DF | 20 | Nguyễn Hồng Phúc | | (substituted on) 79' |
Manager:
Hoàng Anh Tuấn

| GK | 21 | Ernando Ari |
| CB | 13 | Kadek Arel |
| CB | 15 | Haykal Alhafiz | (yellow card) 116' |
| CB | 16 | Muhammad Ferarri |
| CB | 19 | Alfeandra Dewangga (c) | (yellow card) 90+5' |
| DM | 6 | Robi Darwis |
| DM | 7 | Beckham Putra | (yellow card) 39' | (substituted off) 90' |
| RM | 8 | Arkhan Fikri |
| AM | 23 | Rifky Dwi Septiawan | | (substituted off) 87' |
| CF | 10 | Muhammad Ragil | | (substituted off) 46' |
| CF | 12 | Abdul Rahman | | (substituted off) 46' |
Substitutions:
| DF | 3 | Frengky Missa | | (substituted on) 87' |
| FW | 9 | Ramadhan Sananta | (yellow card) 105' | (substituted on) 46' |
| FW | 11 | Jeam Kelly Sroyer | | (substituted on) 46' |
| FW | 20 | Esal Sahrul | (yellow card) 90+5' | (substituted on) 90' |
Manager:
(South Korea) Shin Tae-yong

Player of the Match:
Ernando Ari (Indonesia)

Assistant referees:
Kimsy Pusal (Cambodia)
Ashokraj Jeevaraja (Singapore)
Fourth official:
Abdul Hakim Mohd Haid (Brunei)

Match rules

- 90 minutes.
- 30 minutes of extra time if necessary.
- Penalty shoot-out if scores still level.
- Maximum of twelve named substitutes.
- Maximum of five substitutions, with a sixth allowed in extra time. (Note: Each team was given only three opportunities to make substitutions, with a fourth opportunity in extra time, excluding substitutions made at half-time, before the start of extra time and at half-time in extra time.)

== Post-match ==
To be confirmed.
