= 2023 AFF U-23 Championship squads =

Football tournament in Thailand

Below are the squads for the 2023 AFF U-23 Championship, which took place between 17 August 2023 to 26 August 2023.

Ten national teams affiliated with the ASEAN Football Federation (AFF) and participating in this tournament were required to register a squad containing up to 23 players, including three goalkeepers. Only the players from the following squad list were allowed to appear in this tournament.

== Group A ==
=== Thailand ===
Head coach: Issara Sritaro

| No. | Pos. | Player | Date of birth (age) | Club |
|---|---|---|---|---|
| 1 | GK | Thirawut Sruanson | 10 November 2001 (age 24) | (Football Association of Thailand) Kasetsart |
| 2 | MF | Suksan Bunta | 5 May 2002 (age 24) | (Football Association of Thailand) Chonburi |
| 3 | DF | Thanison Paibulkijcharoen | 19 February 2002 (age 24) | (Football Association of Thailand) Chiangmai United |
| 4 | DF | Chonnapat Buaphan | 22 March 2004 (age 22) | (Football Association of Thailand) BG Pathum United |
| 5 | DF | Songchai Thongcham (captain) | 9 June 2001 (age 25) | (Football Association of Thailand) Chonburi |
| 6 | DF | Kittichai Yaidee | 9 February 2002 (age 24) | (Football Association of Thailand) Samut Prakan City |
| 7 | MF | Phanthamit Praphanth | 12 September 2003 (age 23) | (Football Association of Thailand) PT Prachuap |
| 8 | FW | Yotsakorn Burapha | 8 June 2005 (age 21) | (Football Association of Thailand) Chonburi |
| 9 | FW | Pattara Soimalai | 27 August 2001 (age 25) | (Football Association of Thailand) Chiangmai United |
| 10 | FW | Phodchara Chainarong | 28 March 2001 (age 25) | (Football Association of Thailand) Nakhon Pathom United |
| 11 | FW | Netithorn Kaewcharoen | 31 July 2001 (age 25) | (Football Association of Thailand) Chiangrai United |
| 12 | DF | Apisit Saenseekammuan | 11 October 2002 (age 24) | (Football Association of Thailand) Nongbua Pitchaya |
| 13 | DF | Chiraphong Raksongkham | 9 June 2001 (age 25) | (Football Association of Thailand) Trat |
| 14 | MF | Thakdanai Jaihan | 12 January 2002 (age 24) | (Football Association of Thailand) Chiangrai United |
| 15 | DF | Warinthon Jamnongwat | 6 April 2002 (age 24) | (Football Association of Thailand) Chainat Hornbill |
| 16 | DF | Kritsada Nontharat | 16 February 2001 (age 25) | (Football Association of Thailand) Bangkok United |
| 17 | FW | Chukid Wanpraphao | 2 July 2001 (age 25) | (Football Association of Thailand) Ayutthaya United |
| 18 | MF | Natcha Promsomboon | 8 February 2001 (age 25) | (Football Association of Thailand) Ayutthaya United |
| 19 | FW | Varintorn Watcharapringam | 18 January 2003 (age 23) | (Football Association of Thailand) Chiangrai United |
| 20 | GK | Siriwat Ingkaew | 11 January 2001 (age 25) | (Football Association of Thailand) Phrae United |
| 21 | MF | Nathaphop Kaewklang | 14 September 2001 (age 25) | (Football Association of Thailand) Chainat Hornbill |
| 22 | DF | Kasidit Kalasin | 2 July 2004 (age 22) | (Football Association of Thailand) Chonburi |
| 23 | GK | Sakpon Nichakam | 4 April 2002 (age 24) | (Football Association of Thailand) Chamchuri United |

=== Cambodia ===
Head coach: (Argentina) Félix Dalmás

| No. | Pos. | Player | Date of birth (age) | Club |
|---|---|---|---|---|
| 1 | GK | Tha Chan Rithy | 2 May 2001 (age 25) | (Football Federation of Cambodia) Boeung Ket |
| 2 | DF | Eam Ratana | 12 March 2004 (age 22) | (Football Federation of Cambodia) Soltilo Angkor |
| 3 | DF | Taing Bunchhai | 28 December 2002 (age 23) | (Football Federation of Cambodia) Boeung Ket |
| 4 | MF | Yang Phomin | | |
| 5 | DF | In Khindaro | 17 December 2001 (age 24) | (Football Federation of Cambodia) Prey Veng |
| 6 | DF | Chhom Sokhay | 8 November 2001 (age 24) | (Football Federation of Cambodia) Phnom Penh Crown |
| 7 | FW | Ean Pisey | 11 March 2002 (age 24) | (Football Federation of Cambodia) Kirivong Sok Sen Chey |
| 8 | MF | Chou Sinti | 1 April 2003 (age 23) | (Football Federation of Cambodia) Preah Khan Reach Svay Rieng |
| 9 | FW | Khean Soben | 8 October 2004 (age 22) | (Football Federation of Cambodia) Bati Academy |
| 10 | DF | Leng Nora | 19 September 2004 (age 22) | (Football Federation of Cambodia) Visakha |
| 11 | MF | Min Ratanak | 30 July 2002 (age 24) | (Football Federation of Cambodia) Preah Khan Reach Svay Rieng |
| 12 | DF | Hout Vanneth | 12 January 2004 (age 22) | (Football Federation of Cambodia) Nagaworld |
| 13 | FW | Mean Chanrith | 31 December 2005 (age 20) | (Football Federation of Cambodia) Visakha |
| 14 | MF | Sin Sovannmakara | 6 December 2004 (age 21) | (Football Federation of Cambodia) Visakha |
| 15 | FW | Orn Seyha | 24 August 2001 (age 25) | (Football Federation of Cambodia) Kirivong Sok Sen Chey |
| 16 | FW | Som Ol Tina | 19 January 2003 (age 23) | (Football Federation of Cambodia) Phnom Penh Crown |
| 17 | FW | Sa Ty | 4 April 2002 (age 24) | (Football Federation of Cambodia) Visakha |
| 18 | MF | Kong Lyhour | 5 August 2003 (age 23) | (Football Federation of Cambodia) Prey Veng |
| 19 | FW | Phoeuk Thatthai | 27 January 2005 (age 21) | (Football Federation of Cambodia) Visakha |
| 20 | DF | Koeut Pich | 15 November 2003 (age 22) | (Football Federation of Cambodia) Phnom Penh Crown |
| 21 | GK | Kim Chanveasna | | (Football Federation of Cambodia) Prey Veng |
| 22 | GK | Reth Lyheng | 1 January 2004 (age 22) | (Football Federation of Cambodia) Nagaworld |
| 23 | FW | Sor Rotana | 9 October 2002 (age 24) | (Football Federation of Cambodia) Visakha |

=== Myanmar ===
Head coach: (Germany) Michael Feichtenbeiner

| No. | Pos. | Player | Date of birth (age) | Club |
|---|---|---|---|---|
| 1 | GK | Pyae Phyo Thu | 11 October 2002 (age 24) | (Myanmar Football Federation) Yadanarbon |
| 2 | DF | Nyan Lin Htet | January 10, 2002 (age 24) | (Myanmar Football Federation) Yangon United |
| 3 | DF | Thet Hein Soe | September 29, 2001 (age 25) | (Myanmar Football Federation) Yadanarbon |
| 4 | DF | Latt Wai Phone | May 4, 2005 (age 21) | (Myanmar Football Federation) Shan United |
| 5 | DF | Min Khant | August 5, 2002 (age 24) | (Myanmar Football Federation) Rakhine United |
| 6 | MF | Arkar Kyaw | February 7, 2003 (age 23) | (Myanmar Football Federation) Mahar United |
| 7 | FW | Chit Aye | January 17, 2003 (age 23) | (Myanmar Football Federation) Yadanarbon |
| 8 | MF | Soe Min Oo | May 1, 2002 (age 24) | (Myanmar Football Federation) Myawady |
| 9 | FW | Swan Htet | April 12, 2005 (age 21) | (Myanmar Football Federation) Yadanarbon |
| 10 | MF | Moe Swe | May 31, 2003 (age 23) | (Myanmar Football Federation) Yadanarbon |
| 11 | FW | Khun Kyaw Zin Hein | July 15, 2002 (age 24) | (Myanmar Football Federation) Ayeyawady United |
| 12 | DF | Shin Thant Aung | May 31, 2002 (age 24) | (Myanmar Football Federation) Hanthawaddy |
| 13 | DF | Moe Swe Aung | June 16, 2002 (age 24) | (Myanmar Football Federation) ISPE |
| 14 | FW | Than Toe Aung | July 13, 2003 (age 23) | (Myanmar Football Federation) GFA |
| 15 | MF | Aung Myo Khant | May 16, 2001 (age 25) | (Myanmar Football Federation) Yadanarbon |
| 16 | DF | Lan San Aung | January 15, 2003 (age 23) | (Myanmar Football Federation) ISPE |
| 17 | MF | Min Maw Oo | | (Myanmar Football Federation) Thitsar Arman |
| 18 | GK | Hein Htet Soe | 21 June 2003 (age 23) | (Myanmar Football Federation) Ayeyawady |
| 19 | DF | Naung Naung Soe | October 10, 2002 (age 24) | (Myanmar Football Federation) Yadanarbon |
| 20 | MF | Peter Aung Wai Htoo | April 5, 2001 (age 25) | (Myanmar Football Federation) Ayeyawady |
| 21 | DF | Htoo Myat Khant | March 23, 2005 (age 21) | (Myanmar Football Federation) Kachin United |
| 22 | MF | Than Toe Aung | 13 July 2003 (age 23) | (Myanmar Football Federation) Kachin United |
| 23 | GK | Nay Lin Htet | 13 April 2002 (age 24) | (Myanmar Football Federation) Mahar United |

=== Brunei ===
Head coach: (Japan) Atsushi Hanita

| No. | Pos. | Player | Date of birth (age) | Club |
|---|---|---|---|---|
| 1 | GK | Khairul Hisyam Norihwan | 7 August 2004 (age 22) | (Football Association of Brunei Darussalam) DPMM U20 |
| 2 | DF | Khoirunnaas Khalid | 1 July 2001 (age 25) | (Football Association of Brunei Darussalam) Ar-Rawda FC |
| 3 | MF | Azhari Danial Yusra | | (Football Association of Brunei Darussalam) Indera SC |
| 4 | MF | Abdul Hafiy Herman | 6 February 2005 (age 21) | (Football Association of Brunei Darussalam) Kasuka FC |
| 5 | DF | Wafiq Danish Hasimulabdillah | 13 January 2005 (age 21) | (Football Association of Brunei Darussalam) Kasuka FC |
| 6 | MF | Syafiq Safiuddin Abdul Shariff | 16 July 2002 (age 24) | (Football Association of Brunei Darussalam) Indera SC |
| 7 | MF | Ali Munawwar Abdul Rahman | 30 June 2004 (age 22) | (Football Association of Brunei Darussalam) MS ABDB |
| 8 | MF | Khairan Zikry Zulkhairi | 9 January 2003 (age 23) | (Football Association of Brunei Darussalam) KB FC |
| 9 | MF | Haziq Naqiuddin Syamra | 25 May 2004 (age 22) | (Football Association of Brunei Darussalam) Kota Ranger |
| 10 | FW | Qusyairi Haiqal Arabimulfhasal | | (Football Association of Brunei Darussalam) IKLS-MB5 |
| 11 | FW | Bazli Aminuddin | 24 June 2003 (age 23) | (Football Association of Brunei Darussalam) Kasuka FC |
| 12 | MF | Rozandy Anak Bujang | 28 November 2001 (age 24) | (Football Association of Brunei Darussalam) MS PPDB |
| 13 | DF | Amirul Aizad Zaidi | 29 July 2002 (age 24) | (Football Association of Brunei Darussalam) Indera SC |
| 14 | DF | Hirman Abdul Latip | 25 March 2003 (age 23) | (Football Association of Brunei Darussalam) Indera SC |
| 15 | MF | Imam Mahdi Suhaimi | 9 July 2002 (age 24) | (Football Association of Brunei Darussalam) Kota Ranger |
| 16 | DF | Abdul Wafiy Yazid Sudirman | | (Football Association of Brunei Darussalam) MS ABDB |
| 17 | MF | Hadif Aiman Adanan | 19 October 2001 (age 25) | (Football Association of Brunei Darussalam) MS ABDB |
| 18 | DF | Abdul Basith Murtadha Billah Hussin | | (Football Association of Brunei Darussalam) Indera SC |
| 19 | GK | Riyan Aiman Jali | 9 January 2003 (age 23) | (Football Association of Brunei Darussalam) Kota Ranger |
| 21 | DF | Nazhan Zulkifle (Captain) | 17 January 2001 (age 25) | (Football Association of Brunei Darussalam) Kasuka FC |
| 20 | GK | Jefri Syafiq Ishak | 21 May 2002 (age 24) | (Football Association of Brunei Darussalam) KB FC |
| 22 | FW | Syaherrul Affendy Syahmirul Nizam | 13 January 2004 (age 22) | (Football Association of Brunei Darussalam) IKLS-MB5 |
| 23 | MF | Nazry Aiman Azaman | 1 July 2004 (age 22) | (Football Association of Brunei Darussalam) MS ABDB |

== Group B ==
=== Timor-Leste ===
Head coach: (South Korea) Park Soon-tae

| No. | Pos. | Player | Date of birth (age) | Club |
|---|---|---|---|---|
| 1 | GK | Georgino Mendonça | 16 March 2002 (aged 21) | (Football Federation of Cambodia) Life FC |
| 3 | DF | Orcelio | 30 April 2001 (aged 22) | (East Timor Football Federation) Karketu Dili |
| 4 | DF | Anizo Correia | 23 May 2003 (aged 20) | (East Timor Football Federation) Ponta Leste |
| 5 | DF | Fernando Carvalho | 18 February 2004 (aged 19) | (East Timor Football Federation) SLB Laulara |
| 6 | DF | Ricardo Bianco | 15 January 2006 (aged 17) | (East Timor Football Federation) Ponta Leste |
| 7 | FW | Luís Figo | 17 April 2005 (aged 18) | (East Timor Football Federation) Ponta Leste |
| 8 | MF | Luis da Silva | 20 May 2006 (aged 17) | (East Timor Football Federation) SLB Laulara |
| 9 | FW | Alexandre Moreira | 24 September 2001 (aged 21) | (East Timor Football Federation) Ponta Leste |
| 11 | FW | Serafin da Silva | | (East Timor Football Federation) |
| 12 | GK | Pablo de Jesus | 16 September 2005 (aged 17) | (East Timor Football Federation) Ponta Leste |
| 14 | MF | Luis Pinto | 8 May 2001 (aged 22) | (East Timor Football Federation) Santa Cruz |
| 15 | MF | Pascoal Ximenes | | (East Timor Football Federation) |
| 16 | DF | João Bosco | 2 March 2003 (aged 20) | (East Timor Football Federation) Ponta Leste |
| 17 | MF | Marques de Carvalho | 25 February 2007 (aged 16) | (East Timor Football Federation) SLB Laulara |
| 18 | FW | Olagar Xavier | 18 May 2003 (aged 20) | (East Timor Football Federation) Ponta Leste |
| 19 | MF | Mário Quintão | 18 March 2004 (aged 19) | (East Timor Football Federation) Emmanuel |
| 20 | GK | Junildo Pereira | 17 August 2003 (aged 20) | (East Timor Football Federation) Assalam |
| 21 | MF | Freteliano | 9 August 2004 (aged 19) | (East Timor Football Federation) Emmanuel |
| 23 | MF | Cristevão | 16 January 2004 (aged 19) | (East Timor Football Federation) SLB Laulara |

=== Malaysia ===
Head coach: E. Elavarasan

| No. | Pos. | Player | Date of birth (age) | Club |
|---|---|---|---|---|
| 1 | GK | Syahmi Adib | 30 March 2003 (age 23) | (Football Association of Malaysia) Selangor |
| 2 | DF | Hariz Mansor | 2 January 2002 (age 24) | (Football Association of Malaysia) Kedah Darul Aman |
| 3 | DF | Ubaidullah Shamsul Fazili | 30 November 2003 (age 22) | (Football Association of Malaysia) Terengganu |
| 4 | DF | M. Rakesh | 11 June 2002 (age 24) | (Football Association of Malaysia) Kelantan |
| 5 | DF | Nik Umar | 15 June 2001 (age 25) | (Football Association of Malaysia) Perak |
| 6 | MF | Haziq Kutty Abba | 28 September 2004 (age 22) | (Football Association of Malaysia) Penang |
| 7 | FW | Najmudin Akmal | 11 January 2003 (age 23) | (Football Association of Malaysia) Johor Darul Ta'zim |
| 8 | FW | Muslihuddin Atiq | 20 July 2002 (age 24) | (Football Association of Malaysia) Terengganu |
| 9 | FW | Alif Ikmalrizal | 9 September 2002 (age 24) | (Football Association of Malaysia) Penang |
| 10 | MF | Aliff Izwan | 10 February 2004 (age 22) | (Football Association of Malaysia) Selangor |
| 11 | MF | Saiful Jamaluddin | 28 May 2002 (age 24) | (Football Association of Malaysia) Sri Pahang |
| 12 | MF | Nadzwin Salleh | 23 November 2001 (age 24) | (Football Association of Malaysia) Kuala Lumpur City |
| 13 | MF | Umar Hakeem | 26 August 2002 (age 24) | (Football Association of Malaysia) Johor Darul Ta'zim |
| 14 | DF | V. Ruventhiran | 24 August 2001 (age 25) | (Football Association of Malaysia) Selangor |
| 15 | MF | Fergus Tierney | 19 March 2003 (age 23) | (Football Association of Malaysia) Johor Darul Ta'zim |
| 16 | GK | Azim Al-Amin | 20 September 2001 (age 25) | (Football Association of Malaysia) Kuala Lumpur City |
| 17 | MF | Syahir Bashah | 16 September 2001 (age 25) | (Football Association of Malaysia) Selangor |
| 18 | MF | Muhammad Abu Khalil | 11 April 2005 (age 21) | (Football Association of Malaysia) Selangor |
| 19 | MF | Hazim Abu Zaid | 17 January 2001 (age 25) | (Football Association of Malaysia) Immigration |
| 20 | FW | Aiman Afif | 18 February 2001 (age 25) | (Football Association of Malaysia) Kedah Darul Aman |
| 21 | FW | Harith Akif | 28 October 2001 (age 25) | (Football Association of Malaysia) Kelantan |
| 22 | MF | Firdaus Hasnoddin | 22 April 2002 (age 24) | (Football Association of Malaysia) Kelantan |
| 23 | GK | Rahadiazli Rahalim | 29 May 2001 (age 25) | (Football Association of Malaysia) Terengganu |

=== Indonesia ===
Head coach: (South Korea) Shin Tae-yong

| No. | Pos. | Player | Date of birth (age) | Club |
|---|---|---|---|---|
| 1 | GK | Nuri Agus | 6 August 2001 (aged 22) | (Football Association of Indonesia) Bekasi City |
| 2 | DF | Bagas Kaffa | 16 January 2002 (aged 21) | (Football Association of Indonesia) Barito Putera |
| 3 | DF | Frengky Missa | 20 February 2004 (aged 19) | (Football Association of Indonesia) Persikabo 1973 |
| 5 | MF | Kanu Helmiawan | 27 April 2001 (aged 22) | (Football Association of Indonesia) Persis Solo |
| 6 | MF | Robi Darwis | 22 August 2003 (aged 19) | (Football Association of Indonesia) Persib Bandung |
| 7 | MF | Beckham Putra | 29 October 2001 (aged 21) | (Football Association of Indonesia) Persib Bandung |
| 8 | MF | Arkhan Fikri | 28 December 2004 (aged 18) | (Football Association of Indonesia) Arema |
| 9 | FW | Ramadhan Sananta | 27 November 2002 (aged 20) | (Football Association of Indonesia) Persis Solo |
| 10 | FW | Muhammad Ragil | 8 May 2005 (aged 18) | (Football Association of Indonesia) Bhayangkara |
| 11 | FW | Kelly Sroyer | 11 December 2002 (aged 20) | (Football Association of Indonesia) Persik Kediri |
| 12 | FW | Abdul Rahman | 1 August 2002 (aged 21) | (Football Association of Indonesia) RANS Nusantara |
| 13 | DF | Kadek Arel | 4 April 2005 (aged 18) | (Football Association of Indonesia) Bali United |
| 14 | MF | Salim Tuharea | 30 November 2003 (aged 19) | (Football Association of Indonesia) Madura United |
| 15 | DF | Haykal Alhafiz | 24 March 2001 (aged 22) | (Football Association of Indonesia) PSIS Semarang |
| 16 | DF | Muhammad Ferarri | 21 June 2003 (aged 20) | (Football Association of Indonesia) Persija Jakarta |
| 17 | FW | Irfan Jauhari | 31 January 2001 (aged 22) | (Football Association of Indonesia) Persis Solo |
| 19 | DF | Alfeandra Dewangga | 28 June 2001 (aged 22) | (Football Association of Indonesia) PSIS Semarang |
| 20 | MF | Esal Sahrul | 14 March 2002 (aged 21) | (Football Association of Indonesia) Persita Tangerang |
| 21 | GK | Ernando Ari | 27 February 2002 (aged 21) | (Football Association of Indonesia) Persebaya Surabaya |
| 22 | GK | Daffa Fasya | 7 May 2004 (aged 19) | (Football Association of Indonesia) Borneo Samarinda |
| 23 | MF | Rifky Dwi Septiawan | 3 February 2002 (aged 21) | (Football Association of Indonesia) Persita Tangerang |

== Group C ==
=== Vietnam ===
Head coach: Hoàng Anh Tuấn

| No. | Pos. | Player | Date of birth (age) | Club |
|---|---|---|---|---|
| 1 | GK | Quan Văn Chuẩn | 7 January 2001 (age 25) | (Vietnam Football Federation) Hà Nội |
| 2 | DF | Nguyễn Mạnh Hưng | 8 August 2005 (age 21) | (Vietnam Football Federation) Viettel |
| 3 | DF | Lương Duy Cương | 7 November 2001 (age 24) | (Vietnam Football Federation) SHB Đà Nẵng |
| 4 | DF | Nguyễn Ngọc Thắng | 2 August 2002 (age 24) | (Vietnam Football Federation) Hồng Lĩnh Hà Tĩnh |
| 5 | DF | Lê Nguyên Hoàng | 14 February 2005 (age 21) | (Vietnam Football Federation) Sông Lam Nghệ An |
| 6 | MF | Trần Nam Hải | 5 February 2004 (age 22) | (Vietnam Football Federation) Sông Lam Nghệ An |
| 7 | MF | Nguyễn Văn Trường | 9 October 2003 (age 23) | (Vietnam Football Federation) Hà Nội |
| 8 | MF | Nguyễn Đức Việt | 1 January 2004 (age 22) | (Vietnam Football Federation) Hoàng Anh Gia Lai |
| 9 | MF | Đinh Xuân Tiến | 10 January 2003 (age 23) | (Vietnam Football Federation) Sông Lam Nghệ An |
| 10 | MF | Khuất Văn Khang | 11 May 2003 (age 23) | (Vietnam Football Federation) Viettel |
| 11 | FW | Bùi Vĩ Hào | 24 February 2003 (age 23) | (Vietnam Football Federation) Becamex Bình Dương |
| 12 | FW | Lê Đình Long Vũ | 27 May 2006 (age 20) | (Vietnam Football Federation) Sông Lam Nghệ An |
| 13 | MF | Nguyễn Đăng Dương | 7 September 2005 (age 21) | (Vietnam Football Federation) Viettel |
| 14 | FW | Nguyễn Quốc Việt | 4 May 2003 (age 23) | (Vietnam Football Federation) Hoàng Anh Gia Lai |
| 15 | FW | Nguyễn Minh Quang | 3 February 2001 (age 25) | (Vietnam Football Federation) Bình Thuận |
| 16 | MF | Võ Hoàng Minh Khoa | 12 March 2001 (age 25) | (Vietnam Football Federation) Becamex Bình Dương |
| 17 | FW | Nguyễn Hữu Tuấn | 12 March 2005 (age 21) | (Vietnam Football Federation) Viettel |
| 18 | MF | Thái Bá Đạt | 23 March 2005 (age 21) | (Vietnam Football Federation) PVF |
| 19 | MF | Nguyễn Phi Hoàng | 27 March 2003 (age 23) | (Vietnam Football Federation) SHB Đà Nẵng |
| 20 | DF | Nguyễn Hồng Phúc | 31 May 2003 (age 23) | (Vietnam Football Federation) Hòa Bình |
| 21 | GK | Nguyễn Văn Việt | 12 July 2002 (age 24) | (Vietnam Football Federation) Sông Lam Nghệ An |
| 22 | FW | Phạm Đình Duy | 2 April 2002 (age 24) | (Vietnam Football Federation) SHB Đà Nẵng |
| 23 | GK | Trần Trung Kiên | 9 February 2003 (age 23) | (Vietnam Football Federation) Hoàng Anh Gia Lai |

=== Philippines ===
Head coach: Christopher Pedimonte

| No. | Pos. | Player | Date of birth (age) | Club |
|---|---|---|---|---|
| 1 | GK | Enrico Mangaoang | 28 May 2002 (age 24) | (Philippine Football Federation) CF Manila |
| 2 | DF | John Lucero | 1 December 2003 (age 22) | (The Football Association) Worthing |
| 3 | DF | Caleb Santos | 4 October 2005 (age 21) | (Philippine Football Federation) Pilipinas Dragons |
| 4 | DF | Kamil Amirul | 6 February 2004 (age 22) | (Philippine Football Federation) ADT |
| 5 | FW | Patrick Grogg | 7 November 2002 (age 23) | (Philippine Football Federation) CF Manila |
| 6 | MF | Jacob Peña | 27 November 2002 (age 23) | (Philippine Football Federation) Stallion Laguna |
| 7 | MF | Dennis Chung | 24 January 2001 (age 25) | (Philippine Football Federation) ADT |
| 8 | MF | Jacob Maniti | 16 October 2002 (age 24) | (Danish Football Association) Hobro II |
| 9 | FW | Selwyn Mamon | 4 July 2004 (age 22) | (Philippine Football Federation) Far Eastern University |
| 10 | MF | Justin Frias | 24 July 2004 (age 22) | (Philippine Football Federation) ADT |
| 11 | DF | Yrick Gallantes | 14 January 2001 (age 25) | (Philippine Football Federation) ADT |
| 12 | MF | Francis Tacardon | 30 September 2001 (age 25) | (Philippine Football Federation) University of the Philippines |
| 13 | GK | Dimitrios Makapagkal | 13 February 2004 (age 22) | (Philippine Football Federation) ADT |
| 14 | DF | Jaime Rosquillo | 10 March 2003 (age 23) | (Philippine Football Federation) Dynamic Herb Cebu |
| 15 | FW | John Lloyd Jalique | 4 February 2002 (age 24) | (Philippine Football Federation) Tuloy |
| 16 | MF | Jared Peña | 5 August 2006 (age 20) | (Philippine Football Federation) Pilipinas Dragons |
| 17 | DF | Kart Talaroc | 30 March 2001 (age 25) | (Philippine Football Federation) Davao Aguilas |
| 18 | GK | Iñigo Castro | 2 July 2006 (age 20) | (Philippine Football Federation) Pilipinas Dragons |
| 19 | DF | Joshua Meriño | 11 February 2005 (age 21) | (Philippine Football Federation) Pilipinas Dragons |
| 20 | DF | David Setters | 27 October 2003 (age 23) | (Canadian Soccer Association) Algoma University |
| 21 | MF | Harry Nuñez | 16 December 2004 (age 21) | (Philippine Football Federation) Tuloy |
| 22 | DF | Jian Caraig | 6 August 2005 (age 21) | (Philippine Football Federation) Pilipinas Dragons |
| 23 | MF | Karl Absalon | 17 October 2003 (age 23) | (Philippine Football Federation) Far Eastern University |

=== Laos ===
Head coach: (Italy) Guglielmo Arena

| No. | Pos. | Player | Date of birth (age) | Club |
|---|---|---|---|---|
| 1 | GK | Sanaxai Sonethavong | 3 November 2002 (age 23) | (Lao Football Federation) Viengchanh |
| 2 | DF | Phoutthavong Sangvilay | 16 October 2004 (age 22) | (Lao Football Federation) Ezra |
| 3 | DF | Khamsa-nga Phimmasone | 3 December 2001 (age 24) | (Lao Football Federation) Champasak United |
| 4 | DF | Phetdavanh Somsanith | 24 April 2004 (age 22) | (Lao Football Federation) Master 7 |
| 5 | DF | Anoulack Vannalath | 7 March 2002 (age 24) | (Lao Football Federation) Chanthabouly |
| 6 | DF | Inthachak Sisouphan | 23 May 2001 (age 25) | (Lao Football Federation) Luang Prabang |
| 7 | FW | Anousone Xaypanya | 16 December 2002 (age 23) | (Lao Football Federation) Ezra |
| 8 | MF | Chanthavixay Khounthoumphone | 17 February 2004 (age 22) | (Lao Football Federation) Ezra |
| 9 | FW | Thipphachan Khambai-on | 2 August 2004 (age 22) | (Lao Football Federation) Viengchanh |
| 10 | MF | Kongyang Faidangyangjongtoua | | (Lao Football Federation) Lao Army |
| 11 | FW | Soukphachan Lueanthala | 24 August 2002 (age 24) | (Lao Football Federation) Master 7 |
| 12 | GK | Kop Lokphathip | 8 May 2006 (age 20) | (Lao Football Federation) Ezra |
| 13 | DF | Thanouthong Kietnalonglop | 5 March 2001 (age 25) | (Lao Football Federation) Young Elephants |
| 14 | DF | Victor Ngovinassack | 6 May 2001 (age 25) | (French Football Federation) Is-Selongey |
| 15 | MF | Damoth Thongkhamsavath | 3 April 2004 (age 22) | (Lao Football Federation) Ezra |
| 16 | FW | Phomma Khotphouthone | | (Lao Football Federation) STT |
| 17 | DF | Chittakone Vannachone | 24 December 2004 (age 21) | (Lao Football Federation) Luang Prabang |
| 18 | GK | Solasak Thilavong | 3 November 2003 (age 22) | (Lao Football Federation) Young Elephants |
| 19 | MF | Anoulack Xayyalath | 5 October 2003 (age 23) | (Lao Football Federation) Namtha United |
| 20 | MF | Phudthachak Vongsili | | (Lao Football Federation) Beach District |
| 21 | DF | Inthavong Luangsalath | | (Lao Football Federation) HBT 941 |
| 22 | MF | Souphan Khambai-on | 30 January 2002 (age 24) | (Lao Football Federation) Young Elephants |
| 23 | MF | Chanthaviphone Phoumsavanh | 19 June 2005 (age 21) | (Lao Football Federation) Namtha United |
