= Kanu Helmiawan =

Indonesian footballer (born 2001)

Personal information
- Full name: Mohammad Kanu Helmiawan
- Date of birth: 27 April 2001 (age 25)
- Place of birth: Jakarta, Indonesia
- Height: 1.76 m (5 ft 9 in)
- Position: Defensive midfielder

Team information
- Current team: Persiku Kudus
- Number: 25

Youth career
- 2013–2019: ASIOP Apacinti

Senior career*
Years	Team	Apps	(Gls)
2019–2020	Muba Babel United	5	(1)
2021	Persita Tangerang	0	(0)
2021–2024	Persis Solo	34	(0)
2022	→ PSS Sleman (loan)	12	(0)
2024–2025	PSMS Medan	10	(1)
2025–2026	PSS Sleman	15	(0)
2026–	Persiku Kudus	0	(0)

International career^{‡}
2020	Indonesia U19	2	(0)
2021–2023	Indonesia U23	7	(0)
Medal record
Men's football
Representing Indonesia
AFF U-23 Championship
Runner-up	2023 Thailand	Team
- * Club domestic league appearances and goals as of 11 April 2026 ‡ National team caps and goals as of 26 August 2023

Mohammad Kanu Helmiawan (born 27 April 2001) is an Indonesian professional footballer who plays as a defensive midfielder for Championship club Persiku Kudus.

== Club career ==
=== Muba Babel United ===
Kanu joined the Muba Babel United club in the 2019. He scored 1 goal and one assist in the 2019 season when Muba Babel United played in the second division.

=== Persita Tangerang ===
He was signed for Persita Tangerang to play in 2021 Menpora Cup. Helmiawan made his debut for Persita Tangerang in the 2021 Menpora Cup, he played of his team's two matches in the tournament that preluded the 2021 Liga 1 season.

=== Persis Solo ===
In 2021, Kanu Helmiawan signed a contract with Indonesian Liga 2 club Persis Solo. He made first 2021–22 Liga 2 debut on 26 September 2021, coming on as a starter in a 2–0 win against PSG Pati at the Manahan Stadium, Surakarta.

==== PSS Sleman (loan) ====
In 2022, Helmiawan signed a contract with Indonesian Liga 1 club PSS Sleman, on loan from Persis Solo. He made his league debut on 18 January 2022 in a match against Madura United at the Kapten I Wayan Dipta Stadium, Gianyar.

== International career ==
Kanu Helmiawan has played for Indonesia at the under-19 level. He won his first cap for the under-19 team on 11 October 2020 in a friendly against North Macedonia U19. In October 2021, Kanu was called up to the Indonesia U23 in a friendly match against Tajikistan and Nepal and also prepared for 2022 AFC U-23 Asian Cup qualification in Tajikistan by Shin Tae-yong.

== Career statistics ==
=== Club ===
As of 11 April 2026

Club	Season	League			Cup		Continental		Other		Total	
Club	Season	Division	Apps	Goals	Apps	Goals	Apps	Goals	Apps	Goals	Apps	Goals
Muba Babel United	2019	Liga 2	5	1	0	0	–		0	0	5	1
Muba Babel United	2020	Liga 2	0	0	0	0	–		0	0	0	0
Muba Babel United	Total		5	1	0	0	–		0	0	5	1
Persita Tangerang	2021	Liga 1	0	0	0	0	–		2 (Note: Appearances in Menpora Cup)	0	2	0
Persis Solo	2021	Liga 2	3	0	0	0	–		0	0	3	0
Persis Solo	2022–23	Liga 1	21	0	0	0	–		2 (Note: Appearances in Indonesia President's Cup)	0	23	0
Persis Solo	2023–24	Liga 1	10	0	0	0	–		0	0	10	0
2024–25	Liga 1	0	0	0	0	–		0	0	0	0	
PSS Sleman (loan)	2021–22	Liga 1	12	0	0	0	–		0	0	12	0
PSMS Medan	2024–25	Liga 2	10	1	0	0	–		0	0	10	1
PSS Sleman	2025–26	Championship	15	0	0	0	–		0	0	15	0
Career total			76	2	0	0	–		4	0	80	2

== Honours ==
=== Club ===
Persis Solo

- Liga 2: 2021

PSS Sleman

- Championship runner up: 2025–26

=== International ===
Indonesia U23

- AFF U-23 Championship runner-up: 2023
