= Hiroki Kasahara (referee) =

Japanese football referee (born 1989)

Hiroki Kasahara 笠原寛貴
- Full name: Hiroki Kasahara
- Born: 8 April 1989 (age 37); Fukuoka Prefecture, Japan

Domestic
Years	League	Role
2014–present	J3 League	Referee
2019–present	J.League	Referee

International
Years	League	Role
2020–present	FIFA listed	Referee

Hiroki Kasahara (Japanese: 笠原寛貴, Hepburn: Kasahara Hiroki; born 8 April 1989) is a Japanese football referee, as well as a VAR and AVAR official. He is FIFA-listed since 2020.

== Career ==
Born in Fukuoka Prefecture, Kasahara played for a local football club during his elementary school years, and was a member of the football team of the Municipal Oji Junior High School and later of the Prefectural Chikushi High School. After graduating from the International University of Health and Welfare in 2012, he enrolled in the Japan Football Association's Referee College, a referee training program preparing officials for the local and national leagues. He completed the program in 2014 and obtained his first-class referee qualification.

He has been a referee in the J3 League since 2014, and the J1 League since 2019. In 2020, Kasahara was given the international badge by FIFA.

Kasahara has refereed AFC Champions League Elite matches, and was appointed in August 2025, as Japan's representative at the 2025 FIFA U-17 World Cup in Qatar, leading the inaugural match between South Africa and Bolivia, which ended in a 3–1 victory for the South Africans. He also officiated the final match of 2025 AFC U-20 Asian Cup in China as the main referee.

In August 2023, Kasahara refereed the final of the AFF U-23 Championship in Thailand, between Vietnam and Indonesia, which ended in a Vietnamese victory on penalties. After the game, Indonesia's coach Shin Tae-yong accused Kasahara of "detrimental decisions" that directly affected Indonesia, including an alleged elbow strike by Vietnamese player Nguyễn Hồng Phúc on Indonesian Haykal Alhafiz which, according to Shin, should have been issued with a red card. Shin reacted angrily and scolded Kasahara on the pitch following Indonesia's defeat. The controversy continued in the following days, with the Football Association of Indonesia threatening to withdraw from the AFF Cup after an online campaign by Indonesian fans, which trended the hashtag "GoodByeAFF". Shin also continued the attacks on Kasahara in the days after, saying that he gave a nonexistent penalty kick to Vietnam, after player Nguyễn Minh Quang fell in the goalkeeper's area, with goalkeeper Ernando Ari subsequently saving the kick.

Kasahara also served as the video assistant referee at the 2023 J.League Cup final, which was won 2–1 by Avispa Fukuoka over Urawa Red Diamonds at the Japan National Stadium in Tokyo.

== Selected record ==
2023 AFF U-23 Championship – Thailand
Date	Match	Result	Round
18 August 2023	Malaysia – Indonesia	2–1	Group stage
22 August 2023	Vietnam – Philippines	1–0	Group stage
24 August 2023	Thailand – Indonesia	1–3	Semifinal
26 August 2023	Vietnam – Indonesia	0–0 (6–5)	Final
2025 FIFA U-17 World Cup – Qatar
Date	Match	Result	Round
3 November 2025	South Africa – Bolivia	3–1	Group stage
6 November 2025	Senegal – Costa Rica	1–0	Group stage
9 November 2025	Italy – South Africa	3–1	Group stage
