= Nuri Agus Wibowo =

Indonesian footballer

Personal information
- Full name: Nuri Agus Wibowo
- Date of birth: 6 August 2001 (age 25)
- Place of birth: Karanganyar, Indonesia
- Height: 1.86 m (6 ft 1 in)
- Position: Goalkeeper

Team information
- Current team: Persika Karanganyar

Youth career
- 2020–2021: PSS Sleman Youth

Senior career*
Years	Team	Apps	(Gls)
2021–2024	Persis Solo	0	(0)
2022–2023	→ Persipa Pati (loan)	4	(0)
2023–2024	→ Bekasi City (loan)	2	(0)
2024–2025	Madura United	0	(0)
2025–2026	Persiku Kudus	9	(0)
2026–	Persika Karanganyar	0	(0)
Medal record
Men's football
Representing Indonesia
AFF U-23 Championship
Runner-up	2023 Thailand	Team
- * Club domestic league appearances and goals as of 18 January 2026

Nuri Agus Wibowo (born 6 August 2001) is an Indonesian professional footballer who plays as a goalkeeper for Liga Nusantara club Persika Karanganyar.

== Club career ==
=== Bekasi City ===
On 11 August 2023, Nuri made his debut with Bekasi City against Sriwijaya in a 3–2 win.

=== Persika Karanganyar ===
In October 2026, Nuri officially played for his hometown club, Persika Karanganyar, in the 2026–27 Liga Nusantara campaign.

== Honours ==
=== International ===
Indonesia U-23

- AFF U-23 Championship runner-up: 2023
