= Rifky Dwi Septiawan =

Indonesian footballer (born 2002)

Personal information
- Full name: Rifky Dwi Septiawan
- Date of birth: 3 February 2002 (age 24)
- Place of birth: Tangerang, Indonesia
- Height: 1.72 m (5 ft 8 in)
- Position: Defensive midfielder

Team information
- Current team: PSIS Semarang (on loan from Persita Tangerang)
- Number: 32

Youth career
- Persikota Tangerang
- 2020: Persita Tangerang

Senior career*
| Years | Team | Apps | (Gls) |
| 2021– | Persita Tangerang | 59 | (7) |
| 2025–2026 | → PSM Makassar (loan) | 11 | (0) |
| 2026– | → PSIS Semarang (loan) | 6 | (0) |

International career
| 2017 | Indonesia U16 | 2 | (0) |
| 2023 | Indonesia U23 | 5 | (0) |
Medal record
Men's football
Representing Indonesia
AFF U-23 Championship
| Runner-up | 2023 Thailand | Team |
- * Club domestic league appearances and goals as of 21 November 2026

Rifky Dwi Septiawan (born 3 February 2002) is an Indonesian professional footballer who plays as a defensive midfielder for Championship club PSIS Semarang, on loan from Super League club Persita Tangerang.

== Club career ==
=== Persita Tangerang ===
Septiawan signed for Liga 1 club Persita Tangerang in 2021. He made his first-team debut on 11 September as a substitute against Persib Bandung. On 17 September, he scored his first league goal against Persela Lamongan. On 2 October, he scored again in a 2–2 draw with Borneo Samarinda.

Septiawan was away from club while serving in the Indonesian navy for nearly a year, returning in February 2023 against Persikabo 1973. He scored his first goal of the 2022–23 season on 2 March, opening the scoring in a 2–1 victory over PSS Sleman.

==== Loan to PSM Makassar ====
On 19 June 2025, Septian officially joined PSM Makassar on loan for a season.

==== Loan to PSIS Semarang ====
On 17 September 2026, Septiawan will be on loan at PSIS Semarang, which will be playing in the 2026–27 Championship.

== Career statistics ==
=== Club ===
As of 21 November 2026

| Club | Season | League | | Cup | | Continental | | Other | | Total | |
| Club | Season | Apps | Goals | Apps | Goals | Apps | Goals | Apps | Goals | Apps | Goals |
|---|---|---|---|---|---|---|---|---|---|---|---|
| Persita Tangerang | 2021–22 | 4 | 2 | 0 | 0 | – | | 3 (Note: Appearances in Menpora Cup) | 0 | 7 | 2 |
| Persita Tangerang | 2022–23 | 11 | 1 | 0 | 0 | – | | 0 | 0 | 11 | 1 |
| Persita Tangerang | 2023–24 | 25 | 4 | 0 | 0 | – | | 0 | 0 | 25 | 4 |
| Persita Tangerang | 2024–25 | 19 | 0 | 0 | 0 | – | | 0 | 0 | 19 | 0 |
| PSM Makassar (loan) | 2025–26 | 11 | 0 | 0 | 0 | – | | 0 | 0 | 11 | 0 |
| PSIS Semarang (loan) | 2026–27 | 6 | 0 | 0 | 0 | – | | 0 | 0 | 6 | 0 |
| Career total | | 76 | 7 | 0 | 0 | 0 | 0 | 3 | 0 | 79 | 7 |

== Honours ==
Indonesia U23

- AFF U-23 Championship runner-up: 2023
