= Zulfan Djiaulhaq =

Indonesian footballer (born 2006)

Personal information
- Full name: Muhammad Zulfan Djiaulhaq Mukti
- Date of birth: 9 December 2006 (age 19)
- Place of birth: Bogor, Indonesia
- Height: 1.75 m (5 ft 9 in)
- Position: Defensive midfielder

Team information
- Current team: Persita Tangerang
- Number: 36

Youth career
- 2017–2022: Villa 2000
- 2022–2023: Persita Tangerang U18
- 2023–2025: Persita Tangerang U20

Senior career*
Years	Team	Apps	(Gls)
2025–	Persita Tangerang	22	(0)
- * Club domestic league appearances and goals as of 31 October 2026

Muhammad Zulfan Djiaulhaq Mukti (born 9 December 2006) is an Indonesian professional footballer who plays as a defensive midfielder for Super League club Persita Tangerang.

== Early life ==
Zulfan was born in Bogor Regency, West Java. He lived and grew up in the district of Parung, in the northern part of the regency.

== Club career ==
=== Early career ===
Born in Bogor Regency, Zulfan started his career with Villa 2000 which is based in Pamulang, South Tangerang. At the 2018 Gothia Cup China in Qingdao, he was included in the Villa 2000 U12 squad that will compete in the competition.

=== Persita Tangerang ===
Zulfan spent his youth career with the Villa 2000 Academy and the youth system of Persita Tangerang, eventually helping the Persita Tangerang U20 team win the Elite Pro Academy (EPA) championship title.

He was promoted to the senior team by Spanish manager Carlos Peña during the 2025–26 Super League campaign. Zulfan made his professional first-team debut on 21 December 2025, coming on as a substitute during a 3–0 clean-sheet victory against Persik Kediri at the Indomilk Arena. He registered 16 league appearances during his debut season.

On 5 September 2026, he started his match in the 2026–27 season for Persita, coming on as a substitute during a 1–1 draw over PSIM Yogyakarta.

== Career statistics ==
=== Club ===
As of 31 October 2026

Club	Season	League			Cup		Continental		Other		Total	
Club	Season	Division	Apps	Goals	Apps	Goals	Apps	Goals	Apps	Goals	Apps	Goals
Persita Tangerang	2025–26	Super League	16	0	0	0	—	—	0	0	16	0
Persita Tangerang	2026–27	Super League	6	0	0	0	—	—	0	0	6	0
Career total			22	0	0	0	0	0	0	0	22	0

== Honours ==
Persita Tangerang U-20

- Elite Pro Academy Liga 1 U-20: 2024–25
