= Esal Sahrul =

Indonesian footballer

Personal information
- Full name: Esal Sahrul Muhrom
- Date of birth: 14 March 2002 (age 24)
- Place of birth: Tangerang, Indonesia
- Height: 1.75 m (5 ft 9 in)
- Position: Winger

Team information
- Current team: Persita Tangerang
- Number: 99

Youth career
- 2020–2022: Persita U20

Senior career*
Years	Team	Apps	(Gls)
2023–	Persita Tangerang	64	(9)

International career^{‡}
2023	Indonesia U23	3	(0)
Medal record
Men's football
Representing Indonesia
AFF U-23 Championship
Runner-up	2023 Thailand	Team
- * Club domestic league appearances and goals as of 31 October 2026 (UTC) ‡ National team caps and goals as of 26 August 2023

Esal Sahrul Muhrom (born 14 March 2002) is an Indonesian professional footballer who plays as a winger for Super League club Persita Tangerang.

== Club career ==
=== Persita Tangerang ===
Sahrul is one of the young players promoted to main team of Persita Tangerang. On 14 April 2023, Sahrul made his professional league debut for Persita in a 0–1 loss over PS Barito Putera at Demang Lehman Stadium. Sahrul finished the season with only one appearance with the club.

On 15 July 2023, he started his match in the 2023–24 Liga 1 season for Persita Tangerang, playing as a substitute in a 0–1 away win over RANS Nusantara. A week later, Sahrul scored his first league goal for the club, the winning goal against Persija Jakarta in a 1–0 at the Indomilk Arena. On 28 July 2023, Sahrul scored the equalizer in a 2–2 draw over Persikabo 1973 at the Wibawa Mukti Stadium. He added his third goal of the season on 22 September 2023 with the winning goal against Dewa United in a 1–0.

On 6 March 2024, Sahrul scored the opening goal in a 3–2 away lose over Madura United. On 30 April 2024, Sahrul scored a brace in a 4–2 win against Bali United. With the result victory over Bali United made Persita Tangerang stay away from the relegation zone. They finished in 14th place with 39 points.

== International career ==
In August 2023, Sahrul was called up for the first time to the Indonesia U23 for the 2023 AFF U-23 Championship by Shin Tae-yong. On 18 August 2023, Sahrul made his debut for the under-23 team against Malaysia U23, in a 2–1 lose.

== Career statistics ==
=== Club ===
As of 31 October 2026

Club	Season	League		Cup		Continental		Other		Total	
Club	Season	Apps	Goals	Apps	Goals	Apps	Goals	Apps	Goals	Apps	Goals
Persita Tangerang	2022–23	1	0	0	0	–		0	0	1	0
Persita Tangerang	2023–24	22	6	0	0	–		0	0	22	6
Persita Tangerang	2024–25	15	2	0	0	–		0	0	15	2
Persita Tangerang	2025–26	23	1	0	0	–		0	0	23	1
Persita Tangerang	2026–27	4	0	0	0	–		0	0	4	0
Career total		64	9	0	0	0	0	0	0	64	9

== Honours ==
Indonesia U23

- AFF U-23 Championship runner-up: 2023

Individual

- Super League Goal of the Month: September 2025
