= PTT Stadium =

Association football stadium in Rayong, Thailand

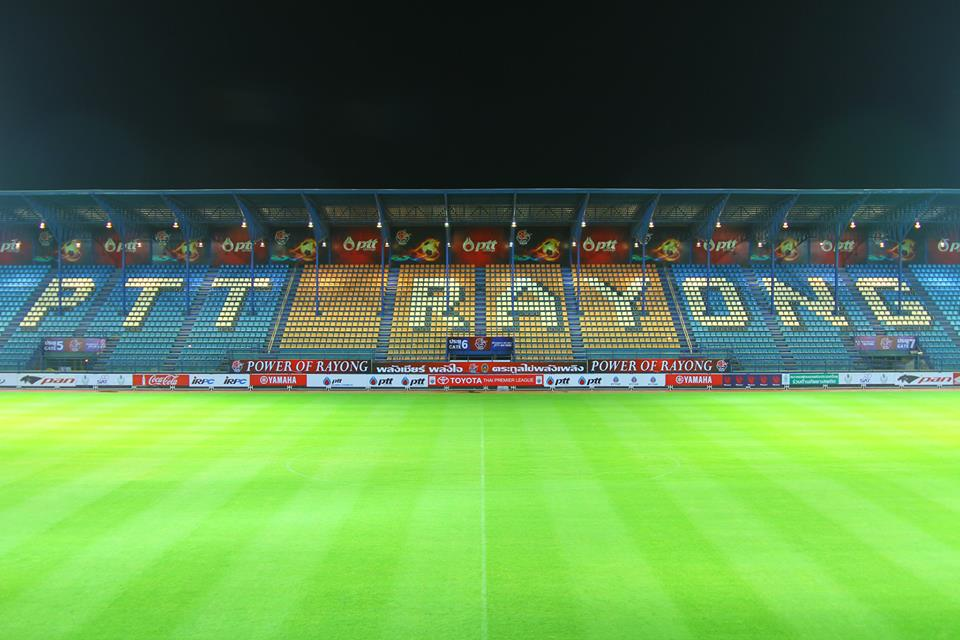
- Interactive map of PTT Stadium
- Former names: Mabka Stadium
- Location: Huai Pong, Mueang Rayong, Rayong, Thailand
- Coordinates: 12°46′02″N 101°09′54″E
- Owner: PTT Public Company Limited
- Operator: PTT Public Company Limited
- Capacity: 12,000
- Surface: Grass

Construction
- Opened: 2012

PTT Stadium (Thai: สนาม ปตท. ระยอง หรือ สนามสวนสมุนไพร มาบข่า; known as Mabka Stadium) is a football stadium located in Rayong, Thailand, with a capacity of 12,000. The name of the ground changed due to sponsorship agreements with PTT Public Company Limited.
