= Nguyễn Hữu Tuấn (footballer, born 2005) =

Vietnamese footballer (born 2005)

Personal information
- Full name: Nguyễn Hữu Tuấn
- Date of birth: 12 March 2005 (age 21)
- Place of birth: Hải Dương, Vietnam
- Height: 1.68 m (5 ft 6 in)
- Position: Winger

Team information
- Current team: Huế (on loan from Thể Công-Viettel)
- Number: 9

Youth career
- –2023: Viettel

Senior career*
Years	Team	Apps	(Gls)
2023–	Thể Công-Viettel	0	(0)
2023–	→ Huế (loan)	43	(9)

International career^{‡}
2024	Vietnam U20	6	(1)
2023–	Vietnam U23	1	(1)
Medal record
Men's football
Representing Vietnam
AFF U-23 Championship
Winner	Thailand 2023
- * Club domestic league appearances and goals as of 6 October 2026 ‡ National team caps and goals as of 24 July 2024

Nguyễn Hữu Tuấn (born 12 March 2005) is a Vietnamese professional footballer who plays as a winger for V.League 2 club Huế, on loan from Thể Công-Viettel.

== Club career ==
Born in Hải Dương, Hữu Tuấn was a youth product of Viettel.

In October 2023, he joined V.League 2 club Huế until the end of the 2023–24 season. He made his professional debut in Huế's 2–0 loss against SHB Đà Nẵng on 27 October 2023.

== International career ==
In August 2023, Hữu Tuấn was named in Vietnam U23's squad for the 2023 AFF U-23 Championship. He made one appearance during the tournament against Philippines and scored the only goal of the match to help Vietnam win 1–0. Vietnam U23 later secured the title after defeating Indonesia in the final.

== Career statistics ==
As of match played 6 October 2026

Appearances and goals by club, season and competition
Club	Season	League			Cup		Other		Total	
Club	Season	Division	Apps	Goals	Apps	Goals	Apps	Goals	Apps	Goals
Huế (loan)	2023–24	V.League 2	12	2	1	0	—		13	2
Huế (loan)	2024–25	V.League 2	19	4	0	0	—		19	4
Huế (loan)	2026	Second Division	11	3	—		1 (Note: Appearances in Second Division promotion play-offs)	2	12	5
Huế (loan)	2026–27	V.League 2	1	0	1	0	—		2	0
Career total			43	9	2	0	1	2	46	11

== Honours ==
Vietnam U23

- AFF U-23 Championship: 2023
