= Đinh Xuân Tiến =

Vietnamese footballer (born 2003)

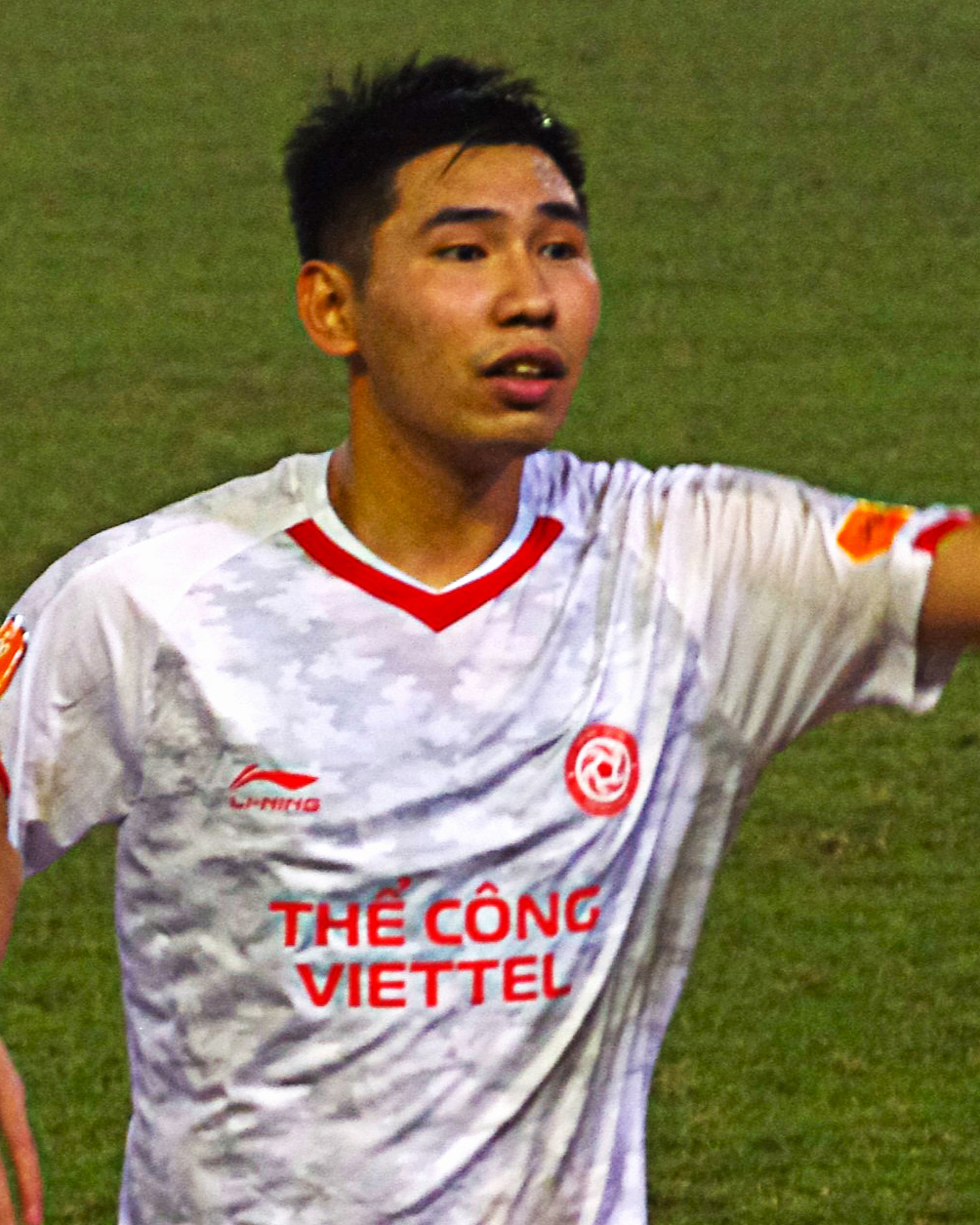
- Đinh Xuân Tiến in 2026

Personal information
- Full name: Đinh Xuân Tiến
- Date of birth: 10 January 2003 (age 23)
- Place of birth: Nam Đàn, Nghệ An, Vietnam
- Height: 1.71 m (5 ft 7 in)
- Position: Attacking midfielder

Team information
- Current team: Thể Công-Viettel
- Number: 19

Youth career
- 2014–2021: Sông Lam Nghệ An

Senior career*
Years	Team	Apps	(Gls)
2021–2026	Sông Lam Nghệ An	63	(7)
2025–2026	→ Thể Công-Viettel (loan)	19	(4)
2026–	Thể Công-Viettel	0	(0)

International career^{‡}
2022–2023	Vietnam U20	3	(3)
2022–2025	Vietnam U23	16	(4)
Medal record
Men's football
Representing Vietnam
AFF U-23 Championship
Winner	Cambodia 2022
Winner	Thailand 2023
SEA Games
Bronze medal – third place	Phnom Penh 2023	Team
- * Club domestic league appearances and goals as of 7 June 2026 ‡ National team caps and goals as of 9 October 2025

Đinh Xuân Tiến (born 10 January 2003) is a Vietnamese professional footballer who plays as an attacking midfielder for V.League 1 club Thể Công-Viettel.

== International career ==
=== U19 ===
No.	Date	Venue	Opponent	Score	Result	Competition
1.	14 September 2022	Gelora Bung Tomo Stadium, Surabaya, Indonesia	Hong Kong	1–0	5–1	2023 AFC U-20 Asian Cup qualification
2.	14 September 2022	Gelora Bung Tomo Stadium, Surabaya, Indonesia	Hong Kong	2–0	5–1	2023 AFC U-20 Asian Cup qualification
3.	16 September 2022	Gelora Bung Tomo Stadium, Surabaya, Indonesia	Indonesia	2–1	2–3	2023 AFC U-20 Asian Cup qualification

=== U23 ===
#	Date	Venue	Opponent	Score	Result	Competition
1.	19 February 2022	Phnom Penh, Cambodia	Singapore	2–0	7–0	2022 AFF U-23 Youth Championship
2.	20 August 2023	Rayong, Thailand	Laos	3–1	4–1	2023 AFF U-23 Championship
3.	2 August 2023	Rayong, Thailand	Malaysia	1–0	4–1	2023 AFF U-23 Championship
4.	2 August 2023	Rayong, Thailand	Malaysia	3–0	4–1	2023 AFF U-23 Championship

== Honours ==
Vietnam U23

- AFF U-23 Championship: 2022, 2023
- SEA Games: Bronze medal: (bronze) 2023

Individual

- AFF U-23 Championship Top Scorer: 2023
- AFF U-23 Championship Team of the Tournament: 2023
