= Ernando Ari =

Indonesian footballer (born 2002)

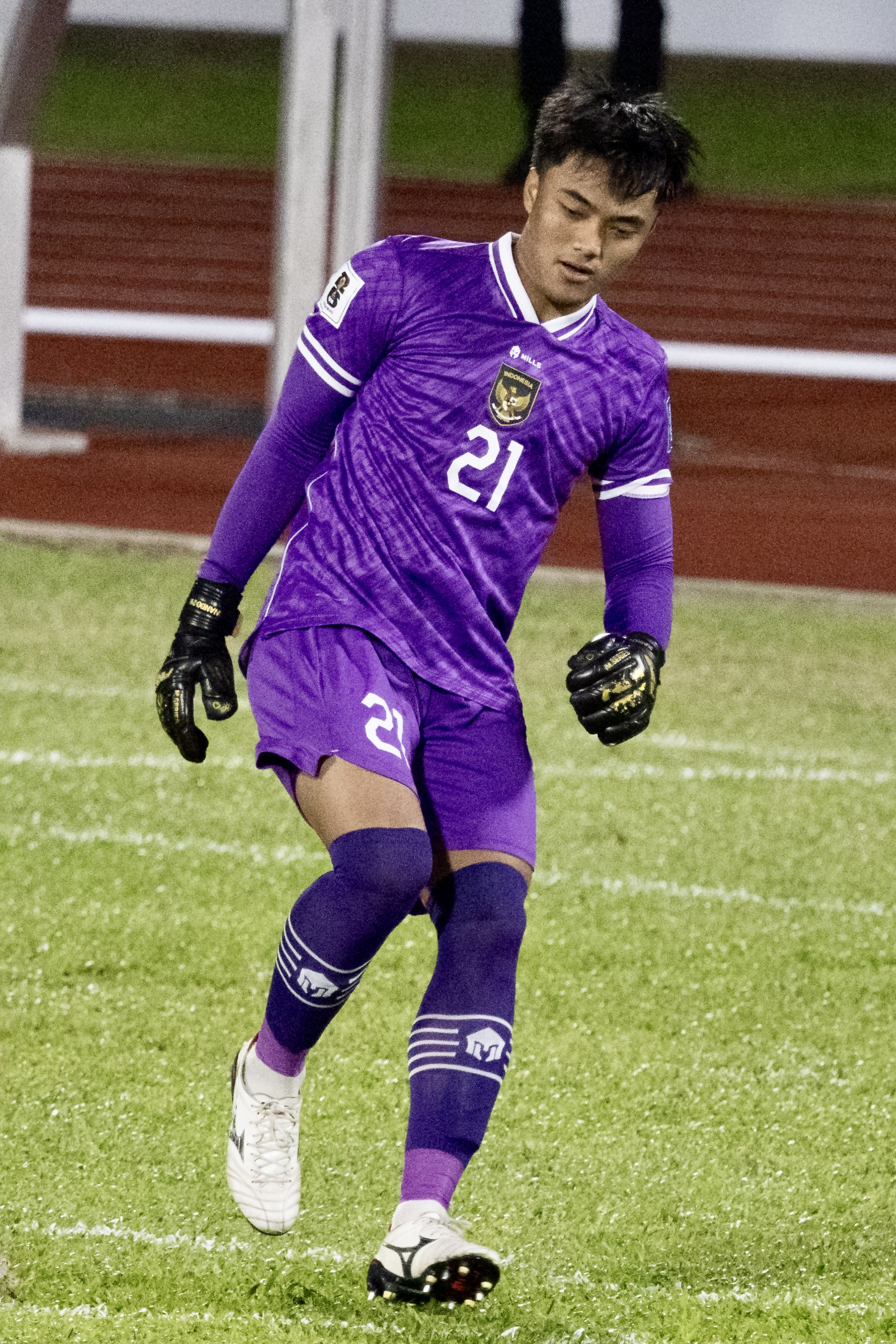
- Ernando Ari playing for Indonesia in 2023

Personal information
- Full name: Ernando Ari Sutaryadi
- Date of birth: 26 February 2002 (age 24)
- Place of birth: Semarang, Indonesia
- Height: 1.80 m (5 ft 11 in)
- Position: Goalkeeper

Team information
- Current team: Persebaya Surabaya
- Number: 21

Youth career
- 2018–2019: Persebaya Surabaya
- 2019: Garuda Select

Senior career*
Years	Team	Apps	(Gls)
2020–	Persebaya Surabaya	102	(0)

International career^{‡}
2017–2018	Indonesia U16	14	(0)
2018–2019	Indonesia U20	6	(0)
2021–2024	Indonesia U23	32	(0)
2021–	Indonesia	15	(0)
Medal record
Men's football
Representing Indonesia
AFF U-16 Youth Championship
Winner	2018 Indonesia
AFF U-19 Youth Championship
Third place	2019 Vietnam
Southeast Asian Games
Gold medal – first place	2023 Cambodia	Team
Bronze medal – third place	2021 Vietnam	Team
AFF U-23 Championship
Runner-up	2023 Thailand	Team
AFF Championship
Runner-up	2020 Singapore	Team
- * Club domestic league appearances and goals as of 18:44, 23 May 2026 (UTC+7) ‡ National team caps and goals as of 21:48, 11 June 2024 (UTC +7)

Ernando Ari Sutaryadi (born 27 February 2002) is an Indonesian professional footballer who plays as a goalkeeper for Super League club Persebaya Surabaya and the Indonesia national team.

== Club career ==
=== Persebaya Surabaya ===
In October 2018, Persebaya Surabaya announced a deal for Ernando Ari to join the club, not only himself, Persebaya also signed his teammate in the Indonesia national under-16 team, Brylian Aldama. He will not immediately join the Persebaya senior team. He had to start his career by joining Persebaya U16.

In January 2019, Ernando Ari was officially promoted to the Persebaya Surabaya senior team, and is ready to made his first career with the team in Indonesian Liga 1, He has joined Persebaya U16 since last season who appeared in the 2018 Elite Pro Academy Liga 1 U16, Ernando Ari actually did not think about joining Persebaya. born in Semarang, initially he wanted to join PSIS Semarang U16 to appear in the same competition. As a result, the player quota at the club was full, causing Ernando Ari to fail to join. The process of joining Persebaya was due to accidental factors.

==== 2021–2022 season ====
Ernando Ari made his first-team debut for Persebaya on 7 April 2021 as a starter in a match against PSS Sleman in the 2021 Menpora Cup tournament. He played his first official league match on 4 September 2021 in a 1–3 loss against Borneo. He was voted the best young player and also selected in the list of the Best Starting Eleven of the second week of 2021–22 Liga 1 after making three saves and conceding only one goal against Persikabo 1973 on 11 September. On 20 November, he kept his first clean sheet in a 1–0 victory over Madura United. On 8 December, he kept his fifth clean sheet in a 3–0 victory over Persib Bandung, in that match, he made seven brilliant saves.

==== 2022–2023 season ====
On 21 December 2022, he kept his first clean sheet of the season in a 0–0 draw with Persis Solo, denying two clear chances from Ryo Matsumura and Alexis Messidoro. Six days later, Ernando Ari extended his contract with the club for two half years, was announced by Persebaya through the club's official Instagram account.

== International career ==
Ernando Ari debuted for the Indonesia U-16 team in 2017 before leading the team to win the 2018 AFF U-16 Youth Championship. He also played in the 2019 AFF U-18 Youth Championship. In 2018, Ernando represented the Indonesia U-16, in the 2018 AFC U-16 Championship. He been call-up for the Senior Team against Chinese Taipei for 2023 AFC Asian Cup qualification. He stopped a penalty from Patrick Wood in his third international U23 team match in a 2–3 loss against Australia U23 on 26 October 2021.

In December 2021, he was named in Indonesian's squad for the 2020 AFF Championship in Singapore.

On 12 December 2021, Ernando Ari earned his first cap, starting in a 2020 AFF Championship against Laos at Bishan Stadium, Bishan, Singapore.

On 19 June 2023, he was included in Indonesia's squad against Argentina, which he played the full 90 minutes in a 0–2 loss.

== Career statistics ==
=== Club ===
As of 23 May 2026

Club	Season	League			Cup		Continental		Other		Total	
Club	Season	Division	Apps	Goals	Apps	Goals	Apps	Goals	Apps	Goals	Apps	Goals
Persebaya Surabaya	2020	Liga 1	0	0	0	0	—		0	0	0	0
Persebaya Surabaya	2021–2022	Liga 1	19	0	0	0	—		2 (Note: Appearances in Menpora Cup.)	0	21	0
Persebaya Surabaya	2022–2023	Liga 1	21	0	0	0	—		0	0	21	0
Persebaya Surabaya	2023–2024	Liga 1	14	0	0	0	—		0	0	14	0
Persebaya Surabaya	2024–2025	Liga 1	24	0	0	0	—		0	0	24	0
Persebaya Surabaya	2025–2026	Super League	24	0	0	0	—		0	0	24	0
Career total			102	0	0	0	0	0	2	0	104	0

=== International appearances ===
As of match played 11 June 2024

Appearances and goals by national team and year
National team	Year	Apps	Goals
Indonesia	2021	1	0
Indonesia	2022	1	0
Indonesia	2023	3	0
Indonesia	2024	10	0
Total		15	0

== Honours ==
Persebaya Surabaya

- Piala Presiden: 2026

Persebaya Surabaya U-20

- Elite Pro Academy U-20: 2019

Indonesia U-16

- JENESYS Japan-ASEAN U-16 Youth Football Tournament: 2017
- AFF U-16 Youth Championship: 2018

Indonesia U-19

- AFF U-19 Youth Championship third place: 2019

Indonesia U-23

- SEA Games gold medal: 2023; bronze medal: 2021
- AFF U-23 Championship runner-up: 2023

Indonesia

- AFF Championship runner-up: 2020
