= Persita Tangerang =

Association football team in Indonesia

- Full name: Persatuan Sepakbola Indonesia Kabupaten Tangerang
- Nicknames: Pendekar Cisadane (Cisadane Warrior); Ayam Wareng (The Fierce Rooster)
- Short name: PTR
- Founded: 9 September 1953; 73 years ago
- Ground: Indomilk Arena
- Capacity: 15,000
- Owner(s): PT Persita Tangerang Raya; PT Budi Delta Swakarya
- President: Ahmed Zaki Iskandar
- Head coach: Carlos Peña
- League: Super League
- 2024–25: Liga 1, 11th of 18
- Website: persitafc.com
Home colours	Away colours

Persatuan Sepakbola Indonesia Kabupaten Tangerang (lit. 'Indonesian Football Association of Tangerang Regency'), commonly known as Persita is an Indonesian professional football club based in Tangerang Regency, Banten, Indonesia. The club currently competes in the Super League. Their nicknames are Pendekar Cisadane (lit. 'Cisadane Warrior') and Ayam Wareng (lit. 'The Fierce Rooster'). Persita Tangerang finished as a runner-up of the 2019 Liga 2 season.

== History ==
Persita was first formed in the city of Tangerang on 19 April 1940. It only became an official club after being recognized by the PSSI on 9 September 1953 as their member. In the Liga Indonesia Premier Division era, they were relegated in the 1998–99 Liga Indonesia Premier Division season but got promoted in the next season and clinched the 2000 First Division title. They became runners-up in the 2002 Liga Indonesia Premier Division, with Benny Dollo as coach. Despite losing in the 2011–12 Liga Indonesia Premier Division final to Barito Putera, they were promoted to the Indonesia Super League. After a poor performance in the 2014 Indonesia Super League season, they were relegated to the Liga Indonesia Premier Division.

== Stadium ==
The club used to play their home matches in Benteng Stadium. In 2014, the government of Tangerang Regency started to build the Benteng Taruna Stadium (known as Indomilk Arena for sponsorship reasons). After the construction was completed in 2018, Persita has been playing their home matches in this stadium. During the renovation of Indomilk Arena, Persita played its home matches at Banten International Stadium for the 2026–27 Super League season from September to October 2026.

== Supporters ==
They have around 10,000 fanatic supporters. Some of the famous supporter groups are LBV (Laskar Benteng Viola), La Viola, and North Legion 1953 (Ultras Persita).

== Rivalries ==
=== Tangerang derby ===
Tangerang derby is an Indonesian football derby between two clubs from Greater Tangerang (Tangerang City and Tangerang Regency), namely Persikota Tangerang and Persita Tangerang. The rivalry and hostility between these two clubs began with the expansion policy of Tangerang Regency, which then gave founded to Tangerang City. The derby is known as one of the hottest derbies in Indonesian football, but unfortunately it is also known as a very forbidden derby, matches between the two are often postponed, cancelled, and have an impact on clubs losses.

=== Rivalry with Persija Jakarta ===
Persita Tangerang has a fairly tense relationship with Persija Jakarta, especially its supporter base. Various clashes between the two supporters often occur, because they are located next to each other.

== Players ==
=== Current squad ===
As of October 2026

Note: Flags indicate national team as defined under FIFA eligibility rules; some limited exceptions apply. Players may hold more than one non-FIFA nationality.

No.	Pos.	Nation	Player
4	DF	IDN	Ryuji Utomo
5	DF	KGZ	Tamirlan Kozubayev
7	FW	ESP	Rayco Rodríguez
8	MF	GEQ	Pablo Ganet
9	FW	IDN	Ahmad Nur Hardianto
10	MF	BRA	Éber Bessa
11	FW	IDN	Hokky Caraka
14	DF	IDN	Diovani Rafly
15	DF	IDN	Charisma Fathoni
18	MF	IDN	Sutanto Tan
19	DF	UZB	Javlon Guseynov (captain)
21	GK	IDN	Rizwan Haikal
27	DF	IDN	Zalnando
28	FW	IDN	Dafiq Firdaus
29	GK	POR	Igor Rodrigues

No.	Pos.	Nation	Player
30	MF	IDN	Andriano Saputra
33	MF	IDN	Wahyudi Hamisi
36	MF	IDN	Zulfan Djiaulhaq
42	DF	IDN	Sandro Magenta
44	DF	IDN	Dion Markx (on loan from Persib Bandung)
46	FW	IDN	Yardan Yafi
53	DF	IDN	Azwan Zulkarami
66	DF	IDN	Mario Jardel
73	DF	IDN	Aep Nursofyan
77	MF	ESP	Tyronne del Pino
90	FW	MAD	Alexandre Ramalingom
93	FW	SRB	Aleksa Andrejić
96	GK	IDN	Kartika Ajie
97	MF	BRA	Luquinhas
99	FW	IDN	Esal Sahrul

=== Out on loan ===
Note: Flags indicate national team as defined under FIFA eligibility rules; some limited exceptions apply. Players may hold more than one non-FIFA nationality.

No.	Pos.	Nation	Player
6	FW	IDN	Evan Tuhuteru (at Adhyaksa Bekasi)
32	MF	IDN	Rifky Dwi Septiawan (at PSIS Semarang)

== Coaching staff ==
Position	Staff
Team manager	(Indonesia) Abdurrahman
Technical director	(Indonesia) Bambang Nurdiansyah
Head coach	(Spain) Carlos Peña
Assistant coach	(Indonesia) Jan Saragih
Physical coach	(Spain) Luis Garcia
Goalkeeper coach	(Indonesia) Raden Muhammad Sabilillahi
Analyst	(Spain) Manuel Crespo

== Honours ==
=== Domestic competitions ===
- Liga Indonesia Premier Division
  - Runners-up: 2002
  - Third-place: 2003
- Liga Indonesia First Division / Liga 2
  - Winners: 2000
  - Runners-up (2): 2019, 2011–12
- Perserikatan First Division
  - Winners: 1988

=== AFF (Southeast Asia competitions) ===
- ASEAN Club Championship
  - 2003 – Quarter-finals

Season	Competition	Round	Club	Home	Away	Aggregate
2003	ASEAN Club Championship	Group stage	(Vietnam) Hoàng Anh Gia Lai	2–1		Group Winners
2003	ASEAN Club Championship	Group stage	(Laos) MCTPC	5–1		Group Winners
2003	ASEAN Club Championship	Quarter-finals	(India) Kingfisher East Bengal	1–2		

== Season-by-season records ==
=== Past seasons ===
Season	League/Division	Tms.	Pos.	Piala Indonesia	I-League Cup	AFC/AFF competition(s)	
1994–95	Premier Division	34	8 in West Div.	–	–	–	–
1995–96	Premier Division	31	Second round	–	–	–	–
1996–97	Premier Division	33	5 in West Div.	–	–	–	–
1997–98	Premier Division	31	did not finish	–	–	–	–
1998–99	Premier Division	28	5 in West Div. Group 2	–	–	–	–
1999–2000	First Division	21	1	–	–	–	–
2001	Premier Division	28	Second round	–	–	–	–
2002	Premier Division	24	2	–	–	AFC Champions League	Qualifying round
2003	Premier Division	20	3	–	–	ASEAN Club Championship	Quarter-finals
2004	Premier Division	18	8	–	–	–	–
2005	Premier Division	28	8 in East Div.	Second round	–	–	–
2006	Premier Division	28	10 in West Div.	Second round	–	–	–
2007–08	Premier Division	36	9 in West Div.	Quarter-finals	–	–	–
2008–09	Super League	18	17	First round	–	–	–
2009–10	Premier Division	33	4 in Group 1	First round	–	–	–
2010–11	Premier Division	39	4 in Group 1	–	–	–	–
2011–12	Premier Division	22	2	–	–	–	–
2013	Indonesia Super League	18	14	–	–	–	–
2014	Indonesia Super League	22	10 in West Div.	–	–	–	–
2015	Premier Division	55	did not finish	–	–	–	–
2016	ISC B	53	Quarter-finals	–	–	–	–
2017	Liga 2	61	Round of 16	–	–	–	–
2018	Liga 2	24	4	Second round	–	–	–
2019	Liga 2	24	2	Second round	–	–	–
2020	Liga 1	18	did not finish	–	–	–	–
2021–22	Liga 1	18	12	–	–	–	–
2022–23	Liga 1	18	9	–	–	–	–
2023–24	Liga 1	18	14	–	–	–	–
2024–25	Liga 1	18	11	–	–	–	–
2025–26	Super League	18	10	–	–	–	–
2026–27	Super League	18	TBD	–	TBD	–	–

Key

- Tms. = Number of teams
- Pos. = Position in league

== Performance in AFC competitions ==
Season	Competition	Round	Club	Home	Away	Aggregate
2002–03	AFC Champions League	Qualifying round	(Thailand) Osotspa	0–1	0–0	0–1

== See also ==
- Tangerang Hawks – a basketball club playing in the IBL under Persita's ownership
