= Nguyễn Hồng Phúc =

Vietnamese footballer

Personal information
- Full name: Nguyễn Hồng Phúc
- Date of birth: 31 May 2003 (age 23)
- Place of birth: Nam Sách, Hải Dương, Vietnam
- Height: 1.78 m (5 ft 10 in)
- Positions: Center back; right back

Team information
- Current team: SHB Đà Nẵng
- Number: 23

Youth career
- –2021: Viettel

Senior career*
Years	Team	Apps	(Gls)
2021–2026	Thể Công-Viettel	11	(0)
2021–2024	→ Hòa Bình (loan)	28	(0)
2025–2026	→ SHB Đà Nẵng (loan)	23	(1)
2026–	SHB Đà Nẵng	7	(0)

International career^{‡}
2017–2018	Vietnam U16	2	(0)
2021–2023	Vietnam U20	15	(0)
2023–2025	Vietnam U23	15	(1)
2026–	Vietnam	2	(0)
Medal record
Men's football
Representing Vietnam
AFF U-19 Youth Championship
Third place	Indonesia 2022
AFF U-23 Championship
Winner	Thailand 2023
- * Club domestic league appearances and goals as of 6 November 2026 ‡ National team caps and goals as of 17 November 2026

Nguyễn Hồng Phúc (born 31 May 2003) is a Vietnamese professional footballer who plays as a center back or right back for V.League 1 club SHB Đà Nẵng and the Vietnam national team.

== Club career ==
Hồng Phúc was formed in the Viettel youth academy. In 2021, he joined Hòa Bình on a long-term loan deal. In the 2022 season, he played an important role in helping Hòa Bình gaining a promotion from Vietnamese Second Division to V.League 2. In his first season in V.League 2, Hồng Phúc made 7 appearances and finished 4th in the league with his team.

In March 2024, Hồng Phúc's loan spell at Hòa Bình ended as he was recalled by Thể Công-Viettel for the second part of the 2023–24 V.League 1 season.

In August 2025, Hồng Phúc was loaned to V.League 1 fellow SHB Đà Nẵng.

== International career ==
In September 2018, Hồng Phúc was called up to the Vietnam U16 squad for the 2018 AFC U-16 Championship but didn't play a single minute during the tournament.

In 2022, Hồng Phúc was part of the Vietnam U19 team that finished third in the AFF U-19 Youth Championship.

Between February and March 2023, Hồng Phúc participated in the 2023 AFC U-20 Championship with Vietnam national under-20s. He appeared in all three group stage matches before Vietnam was eliminated. Later in the year, he was named in Vietnam U23's 23-men squad for the 2023 AFF U-23 Championship. He scored one goal in the 4–1 semi-final win against Malaysia and later appeared as a substitute in the final as Vietnam won the tournament.

== Honours ==
Vietnam U19

- AFF U-19 Youth Championship third place: 2022
- International Thanh Niên Newspaper Cup: 2022

Vietnam U23

- AFF U-23 Championship: 2023
