= 2023 AFF U-23 Championship =

AFF U-23 Championship Thailand 2023

Tournament details
- Host country: Thailand
- Dates: 17–26 August
- Teams: 10 (from 1 sub-confederation)
- Venues: 2 (in 1 host city)

Final positions
- Champions: Vietnam (2nd title)
- Runners-up: Indonesia
- Third place: Thailand
- Fourth place: Malaysia

Tournament statistics
- Matches played: 16
- Goals scored: 47 (2.94 per match)
- Attendance: 14,925 (933 per match)
- Top scorer(s): (Malaysia) Alif Ikmalrizal (Vietnam) Đinh Xuân Tiến (3 goals)
- Best player: (Indonesia) Arkhan Fikri
- Best goalkeeper: (Vietnam) Quan Văn Chuẩn

The 2023 AFF U-23 Championship was the 4th edition of the AFF U-23 Championship, organised by the ASEAN Football Federation (AFF). The tournament took place from 17 to 26 August in Rayong, Thailand. Vietnam are the defending champions, having won the 2022 edition and successfully defended their title through a 6–5 victory on penalties following a 0–0 draw after extra time over Indonesia in the final, thus becoming the first team to win the tournament for a second time.

== Qualified teams ==
There was no qualification phase. Singapore withdrew due to the country's under-23 team being subject to evaluation following the 2023 SEA Games. The following teams, all from member associations of the AFF, entered the tournament:

Team	Association	Appearance	Previous best performance
Brunei	FA Brunei Darussalam	2nd	Group stage (2022)
Cambodia	FF Cambodia	4th	Fourth place (2019)
Indonesia	FA Indonesia	2nd	Champions (2019)
Laos	Lao FF	3rd	Third place (2022)
Malaysia	FA Malaysia	4th	Fourth place (2005)
Myanmar	Myanmar FF	3rd	Third place (2005)
Philippines	Philippine FF	4th	Group stage (2005, 2019, 2022)
Thailand	FA Thailand	3rd	Champions (2005)
Timor-Leste	FF Timor-Leste	4th	Third place (2022)
Vietnam	Vietnam FF	3rd	Champions (2022)

Did not enter
Australia
Singapore

== Draw ==
The draw for the 2023 AFF U-23 Championship was held on 29 May 2023 in Bangkok, Thailand and was streamed online in the competition's official YouTube channel. The seeding was based on the performance from the previous tournaments.

Pot 1	Pot 2	Pot 3
1. Thailand (H); 2. Vietnam; 3. Timor-Leste	4. Malaysia; 5. Cambodia; 6. Philippines	7. Indonesia; 8. Laos; 9. Myanmar; 10. Brunei

== Squads ==
A final squad of 23 players (three of whom must be goalkeepers) must be registered one day before the first match of the tournament.

== Match officials ==
- (Brunei) Abdul Hakim Mohd Haidi
- (Vietnam) Ngô Duy Lân
- (Laos) Souei Vongkham
- (Malaysia) Muhammad Usaid Jamal
- (South Korea) Choi Hyun-jai
- (Thailand) Songkran Bunmeekiart
- (Thailand) Torpong Somsing
- (Japan) Hiroki Kasahara

== Venues ==
Rayong
PTT Stadium	Rayong Province Stadium
Capacity: 12,000	Capacity: 7,500

== Group stage ==
All times are local, ICT (UTC+7).

=== Group A ===
Pos	Team	Pld	W	D	L	GF	GA	GD	Pts	Qualification
1	Thailand (H)	3	3	0	0	8	0	+8	9	Knockout stage
2	Cambodia	3	1	1	1	6	3	+3	4	
3	Myanmar	3	1	1	1	5	5	0	4	
4	Brunei	3	0	0	3	1	12	−11	0	

Source: AFF
Rules for classification: 1) points; 2) head-to-head; 3) goal difference; 4) goals scored; 5) penalty shoot-out; 6) disciplinary points; 7) drawing of lots.
(H) Hosts
17 August 2023
16:00

Cambodia	5–0	Brunei
Rotana 5', 50'; Jefri 9' (o.g.); Chanrith 73'; Pisey 90'	Report

PTT Stadium, Rayong
Attendance: 0
Referee: Ngô Duy Lân (Vietnam)
17 August 2023
20:00

Thailand	3–0	Myanmar
Phodchara 21'; Chukid 32'; Yotsakorn 89' (pen.)	Report

PTT Stadium, Rayong
Attendance: 2,512
Referee: Choi Hyun-jai (South Korea)

19 August 2023
16:00

Myanmar	1–1	Cambodia
Kyaw Zin Hein 88'	Report	Lyhour 13'

PTT Stadium, Rayong
Attendance: 126
Referee: Muhammad Usaid Jamal (Malaysia)
19 August 2023
20:00

Brunei	0–3	Thailand
	Report	Varintorn 15'; Pattara 20'; Chirapong 66'

PTT Stadium, Rayong
Attendance: 2,350
Referee: Souei Vongkham (Laos)

21 August 2023
20:00

Thailand	2–0	Cambodia
Tina 50' (o.g.); Netithorn 80'	Report

PTT Stadium, Rayong
Attendance: 2,070
Referee: Ngô Duy Lân (Vietnam)
21 August 2023
20:00

Brunei	1–4	Myanmar
Wafiq 71'	Report	Naung Naung Soe 28'; Swan Htet 47'; Moe Swe 52'; Chit Aye 67'

Rayong Province Stadium, Rayong
Attendance: 68
Referee: Muhammad Usaid Jamal (Malaysia)

=== Group B ===
Pos	Team	Pld	W	D	L	GF	GA	GD	Pts	Qualification
1	Malaysia	2	2	0	0	5	2	+3	6	Knockout stage
2	Indonesia	2	1	0	1	2	2	0	3	Knockout stage
3	Timor-Leste	2	0	0	2	1	4	−3	0	

Source: AFF
Rules for classification: 1) points; 2) head-to-head; 3) goal difference; 4) goals scored; 5) penalty shoot-out; 6) disciplinary points; 7) drawing of lots.
18 August 2023
20:00

Malaysia	2–1	Indonesia
Tierney 54' (pen.), 63'	Report	Sananta 29'

Rayong Province Stadium, Rayong
Attendance: 700
Referee: Hiroki Kasahara (Japan)
20 August 2023
20:00

Indonesia	1–0	Timor-Leste
Sananta 45'	Report

Rayong Province Stadium, Rayong
Attendance: 253
Referee: Torpong Somsing (Thailand)
22 August 2023
20:00

Timor-Leste	1–3	Malaysia
Olagar 41'	Report	Alif 5', 64'; Izwan 13'

PTT Stadium, Rayong
Attendance: 56
Referee: Abdul Hakim Mohd Haidi (Brunei)

=== Group C ===
Pos	Team	Pld	W	D	L	GF	GA	GD	Pts	Qualification
1	Vietnam	2	2	0	0	5	1	+4	6	Knockout stage
2	Philippines	2	0	1	1	2	3	−1	1	
3	Laos	2	0	1	1	3	6	−3	1	

Source: AFF
Rules for classification: 1) points; 2) head-to-head; 3) goal difference; 4) goals scored; 5) penalty shoot-out; 6) disciplinary points; 7) drawing of lots.
18 August 2023
16:00

Philippines	2–2	Laos
Mamon 23'; Chung 90+2'	Report	Khamsa 39'; Souphan 90+5'

Rayong Province Stadium, Rayong
Attendance: 77
Referee: Songkran Bunmeekiart (Thailand)
20 August 2023
16:00

Laos	1–4	Vietnam
Thipphachanh 53'	Report	Phetdavanh 23' (o.g.); Nguyễn Minh Quang 73'; Đinh Xuân Tiến 76'; Bùi Vĩ Hào 90+3'

Rayong Province Stadium, Rayong
Attendance: 181
Referee: Abdul Hakim Mohd Haidi (Brunei)
22 August 2023
20:00

Vietnam	1–0	Philippines
Nguyễn Hữu Tuấn 18'	Report

Rayong Province Stadium, Rayong
Attendance: 607
Referee: Hiroki Kasahara (Japan)

== Ranking of second-placed teams ==
Only one second-placed team qualified for the semi-finals.

Result against fourth-placed team in Group A were not considered for this ranking.

Pos	Grp	Team	Pld	W	D	L	GF	GA	GD	Pts	Qualification
1	B	Indonesia	2	1	0	1	2	2	0	3	Knockout stage
2	C	Philippines	2	0	1	1	2	3	−1	1	
3	A	Cambodia	2	0	1	1	1	3	−2	1	

Source: AFF
Rules for classification: 1) points; 2) goal difference; 3) goals scored; 4) disciplinary points; 5) drawing of lots.

== Knockout stage ==
In the knockout stage, the penalty shoot-out was used to decide the winner if necessary.

=== Bracket ===
Semi-finals
24 August – Rayong
Malaysia	1
Vietnam	4
24 August – Rayong
Thailand	1
Indonesia	3

Final
26 August – Rayong
Vietnam (p)	0 (6)
Indonesia	0 (5)
Third Place
26 August – Rayong
Malaysia	0 (3)
Thailand (p)	0 (4)

=== Semi-finals ===
24 August 2023
16:00

Malaysia	1–4	Vietnam
Alif 49'	Report	Đinh Xuân Tiến 8', 44'; Nguyễn Quốc Việt 32'; Nguyễn Hồng Phúc 85'

Rayong Province Stadium, Rayong
Attendance: 395
Referee: Choi Hyun-jai (South Korea)
24 August 2023
20:00

Thailand	1–3	Indonesia
Chukid 27'	Report	Sroyer 10'; Ferarri 23'; Natcha 45+1' (o.g.)

Rayong Province Stadium, Rayong
Attendance: 3,214
Referee: Hiroki Kasahara (Japan)

=== Third place match ===
26 August 2023
16:00

Malaysia	0–0	Thailand
	Report
Penalties
Tierney (penalty scored); Izwan (penalty scored); Syahir (penalty missed); Ruventhiran (penalty scored); Khalil (penalty missed)	3–4	(penalty scored) Thanison; (penalty scored) Pattara; (penalty scored) Songchai; (penalty missed) Thakdanai; (penalty scored) Chukid

Rayong Province Stadium, Rayong
Attendance: 774
Referee: Choi Hyun-jai (South Korea)

=== Final ===
26 August 2023
20:00

Vietnam	0–0 (a.e.t.)	Indonesia
	Report
Penalties
Nguyễn Đức Việt (penalty scored); Đinh Xuân Tiến (penalty scored); Lê Nguyên Hoàng (penalty scored); Trần Nam Hải (penalty scored); Lương Duy Cương (penalty scored); Thái Bá Đạt (penalty scored)	6–5	(penalty scored) Dewangga; (penalty scored) Arkhan; (penalty scored) Frengky; (penalty scored) Sroyer; (penalty scored) Sananta; (penalty missed) Ernando

Rayong Province Stadium, Rayong
Attendance: 1,542
Referee: Hiroki Kasahara (Japan)

== Statistics ==
=== Winners ===
2023 AFF U-23 Championship winners

Vietnam
Second title

=== Awards ===
Most Valuable Player	Top Scorer Award	Best Goalkeeper Award
(Indonesia) Arkhan Fikri	(Malaysia) Alif Ikmalrizal (Vietnam) Đinh Xuân Tiến	(Vietnam) Quan Văn Chuẩn

=== Team of the Tournament ===
Goalkeeper	Defenders	Midfielders	Forwards
(Vietnam) Quan Văn Chuẩn	(Indonesia) Frengky Missa; (Thailand) Songchai Thongcham; (Vietnam) Lương Duy Cương; (Indonesia) Robi Darwis	(Vietnam) Khuất Văn Khang; (Indonesia) Arkhan Fikri; (Vietnam) Đinh Xuân Tiến	(Indonesia) Ramadhan Sananta; (Malaysia) Alif Ikmalrizal; (Thailand) Chukid Wanpraphao

=== Goalscorers ===
There were 47 goals scored in 16 matches, for an average of 2.94 goals per match.

3 goals

- (Malaysia) Alif Ikmalrizal
- (Vietnam) Đinh Xuân Tiến

2 goals

- (Cambodia) Sor Rotana
- (Indonesia) Ramadhan Sananta
- (Malaysia) Fergus Tierney
- (Thailand) Chukid Wanpraphao

1 goal

- (Brunei) Wafiq Danish
- (Cambodia) Meas Chanrith
- (Cambodia) Kong Lyhour
- (Cambodia) Ean Pisey
- (Indonesia) Jeam Kelly Sroyer
- (Indonesia) Muhammad Ferarri
- (Laos) Souphan Khambaion
- (Laos) Khamsa Phimmasone
- (Laos) Thipphachanh Khambaion
- (Malaysia) Aliff Izwan
- (Myanmar) Chit Aye
- (Myanmar) Kyaw Zin Hein
- (Myanmar) Moe Swe
- (Myanmar) Naung Naung Soe
- (Myanmar) Swan Htet
- (Philippines) Dennis Chung
- (Philippines) Selwyn Mamon
- (Thailand) Phodchara Chainarong
- (Thailand) Yotsakorn Burapha
- (Thailand) Chiraphong Raksongkham
- (Thailand) Pattara Soimalai
- (Thailand) Varintorn Watcharaprinngam
- (Thailand) Netithorn Kaewcharoen
- (Timor-Leste) Olagar Xavier
- (Vietnam) Bùi Vĩ Hào
- (Vietnam) Nguyễn Hữu Tuấn
- (Vietnam) Nguyễn Hồng Phúc
- (Vietnam) Nguyễn Minh Quang
- (Vietnam) Nguyễn Quốc Việt

1 own goal

- (Brunei) Jefri Syafiq (against Cambodia)
- (Cambodia) Sam Ol Tina (against Thailand)
- (Laos) Phetdavanh Somsanid (against Vietnam)
- (Thailand) Natcha Promsomboon (against Indonesia)

=== Final ranking ===
This table will show the ranking of teams throughout the tournament.

Pos	Team	Pld	W	D	L	GF	GA	GD	Pts	Final result
1	Vietnam	4	3	1	0	9	2	+7	10	Champions
2	Indonesia	4	2	1	1	5	3	+2	7	Runners-up
3	Thailand (H)	5	3	1	1	9	3	+6	10	Third place
4	Malaysia	4	2	1	1	6	6	0	7	Fourth place
5	Cambodia	3	1	1	1	6	3	+3	4	Eliminated in the group stage
6	Myanmar	3	1	1	1	5	5	0	4	Eliminated in the group stage
7	Philippines	2	0	1	1	2	3	−1	1	Eliminated in the group stage
8	Laos	2	0	1	1	3	6	−3	1	Eliminated in the group stage
9	Timor-Leste	2	0	0	2	1	4	−3	0	Eliminated in the group stage
10	Brunei	3	0	0	3	1	12	−11	0	Eliminated in the group stage

Source: Group stage, Knockout stage
(H) Hosts

== Broadcasting rights ==
Country	Broadcaster Network	Channel TV	Online
Brunei	RTB	RTB Aneka	RTBGo
Cambodia	Bayon TV	BTV News	BTV News TV (YouTube), BTV Cambodia, BTV Sports (Facebook)
Indonesia	SCM	SCTV, Nex Parabola	Vidio
Philippines	SCM	SCTV, Nex Parabola	Vidio
Timor Leste	SCM	SCTV, Nex Parabola	Vidio
Malaysia	RTM	Sukan RTM	
Thailand	Truevision	Truesport 2, Truesport 3	Truesport Now, TrueID
Vietnam	SCTV, VTV	SCTV15, SCTV17, VTV5 Tây Nam Bộ, VTV Cần Thơ	SCTV Online, Mytv, TV360, FPT Play
