= 2025–26 Bali United F.C. season =

Indonesian football club season

Bali United
2025–26 season
- Chairman: Pieter Tanuri
- Head coach: Johnny Jansen
- Stadium: Kapten I Wayan Dipta Stadium
- Super League: 8th
- Top goalscorer: Boris Kopitović (8)
- Highest home attendance: 14,514 (vs Persib, 1 November 2025)
- Lowest home attendance: 3,088 (Note: Excluding matches played behind closed doors.) (vs PSM, 27 April 2026)
- Average home league attendance: 6,409
- Biggest win: 6–1 (vs PSBS, 6 April 2026)
- Biggest defeat: 2–5 (vs Persebaya, 23 August 2025); 0–3 (vs Persis, 12 March 2026)
Home colours	Away colours	Third colours

The 2025–26 season is the 11th in the history of Bali United Football Club and the club's 10th consecutive season in the top flight of Indonesian football. The club is participating only in the Super League (rebranded from Liga 1) as they are not qualified for any AFC nor AFF club competitions and the Piala Indonesia still not held again this season.

This is Bali United's first season under new head coach Johnny Jansen, who was announced as Stefano Cugurra's replacement on 26 May 2025.

== Squad ==
Note: Flags indicate national team as has been defined under FIFA eligibility rules. Players may hold more than one non-FIFA nationality.

No.	Player	Nationality	Date of birth (age)	Joined	Signed from
Goalkeepers
1	Mike Hauptmeijer	(Netherlands)	18 March 1997 (age 29)	2025	(Netherlands) PEC Zwolle
21	Wayan Arta (U23)	(Indonesia)	1 October 2006 (age 20)	2024	Youth Sector
31	Dikri Yusron	(Indonesia)	8 January 1995 (age 31)	2025	Gresik United
95	Fitrul Dwi Rustapa	(Indonesia)	5 June 1995 (age 31)	2024	Persib
Defenders
2	João Ferrari	(Brazil)	25 June 1997 (age 29)	2025	PSIS
4	Kadek Arel (U23)	(Indonesia)	4 April 2005 (age 21)	2023	Youth Sector
5	Bagas Adi Nugroho	(Indonesia)	8 March 1997 (age 29)	2024	Arema
16	Rizky Dwi Febrianto	(Indonesia)	22 February 1997 (age 29)	2024	Persis
24	Ricky Fajrin (captain)	(Indonesia)	6 September 1995 (age 31)	2015	SSB Berlian Rajawali
33	Made Andhika	(Indonesia)	12 June 1996 (age 30)	2016	Youth Sector
44	Putu Panji (U23)	(Indonesia)	2 April 2008 (age 18)	2025	Youth Sector
77	Yusuf Meilana	(Indonesia)	4 May 1998 (age 28)	2026	Persik (loan)
93	Gede Agus	(Indonesia)	1 June 2002 (age 24)	2021	Youth Sector
Midfielders
6	Brandon Wilson	(Australia)	28 January 1997 (age 29)	2024	Free agent
7	Thijmen Goppel	(Netherlands)	16 February 1997 (age 29)	2025	(Germany) Wehen Wiesbaden
8	Jordy Bruijn	(Netherlands)	23 July 1996 (age 30)	2025	(Netherlands) Heracles Almelo
10	Mirza Mustafić	(Luxembourg)	20 June 1998 (age 28)	2025	(Bosnia and Herzegovina) Sarajevo
14	Tim Receveur	(Netherlands)	30 July 1991 (age 35)	2025	(Netherlands) Almere City
17	Teppei Yachida	(Japan)	1 November 2001 (age 25)	2025	(Japan) RB Omiya Ardija
18	Kadek Agung	(Indonesia)	25 June 1998 (age 28)	2018	Youth Sector
41	Irfan Jaya	(Indonesia)	1 May 1996 (age 30)	2022	PSS
42	Maouri Simon (U23)	(Indonesia)	9 November 2006 (age 20)	2024	Youth Sector
47	Rahmat Arjuna (U23)	(Indonesia)	30 April 2004 (age 22)	2022	Youth Sector
55	Made Tito (U23)	(Indonesia)	31 July 2003 (age 23)	2022	Youth Sector
79	Aris Sanjaya (U23)	(Indonesia)	17 April 2007 (age 19)	2025	Youth Sector
87	Komang Dedi (U23)	(Indonesia)	23 November 2003 (age 22)	2023	Youth Sector
91	Rahmat	(Indonesia)	28 May 1988 (age 38)	2020	PSM
92	Reyner Barusu (U23)	(Indonesia)	27 December 2005 (age 20)	2025	Youth Sector
99	Diego Campos	(Costa Rica)	1 October 1995 (age 31)	2026	(Costa Rica) Alajuelense
Forwards
9	Boris Kopitović	(Montenegro)	27 April 1995 (age 31)	2025	(Singapore) Tampines Rovers
19	Jens Raven (U23)	(Indonesia)	12 October 2005 (age 21)	2025	(Netherlands) Dordrecht
Players who left the club during the season
11	Yabes Roni	(Indonesia)	6 February 1995 (age 31)	2015	Persap
15	Nathan Ari (U23)	(Indonesia)	3 August 2006 (age 20)	2024	Youth Sector
78	Ananta Krisna (U23)	(Indonesia)	19 May 2006 (age 20)	2025	Youth Sector

== Coaching staff ==
Position	Staff
Head coach	(Netherlands) Johnny Jansen
Assistant coach	(Netherlands) Ronnie Pander (Netherlands) Jeffrey Talan (Indonesia) I Gde Mahatma Dharma
Goalkeeping coach	(Brazil) Marcelo Pires (Indonesia) I Made Wardana
Physical coach	(Indonesia) Muhammad Rasyid
Performance coach	(Netherlands) Hendrickus Aben
Analyst	(Indonesia) Fery Muchlas

Last updated: 1 July 2025

== Pre-season and friendlies ==
On 19 July 2025, a behind-closed-doors friendly was played against Bhayangkara Presisi Lampung at the Bali United Training Center. After that, it was confirmed that they would play two friendly matches, facing Deltras and newly-promoted PSIM. The match against PSIM would be held in conjunction with the team's official launching event. A match in Surakarta against Persis was added to conclude the pre-season fixtures.

Bali United's score is shown first in each case.

Bali United pre-season results
Date	Venue	Opponents	Score	Bali United scorers	Att.	Ref.
19 July 2025	Bali United Training Center, Gianyar (H)	Bhayangkara Presisi	2–0	Fajrin, Andhika	0	
19 July 2025	Bali United Training Center, Gianyar (H)	Bhayangkara Presisi	1–3	Sette	0	
23 July 2025	Bali United Training Center, Gianyar (H)	Deltras	4–1	João Ferrari, Kopitović (2), Receveur	0	
26 July 2025	Kapten I Wayan Dipta, Gianyar (H)	PSIM	6–0	Mustafić, Kopitović, Agung, Irfan, Goppel, Reyner	7,993	
3 August 2025	UNS, Surakarta (A)	Persis	2–1	Irfan, Kopitović	0	
3 September 2025	Bali United Training Center, Gianyar (H)	Perseden	4–3	Rahmat (2), Dwik, Maouri	0	
3 October 2025	Bali United Training Center, Gianyar (H)	Perseden	4–1	N/A	0	

== Super League ==
Bali United's place in the 2025–26 Super League season was confirmed on 19 April 2025. It is their 10th season in the Super League as well as their 10th consecutive season and overall season in the top flight of Indonesian football. The fixtures were announced on 15 July 2025. The competition begins on 8 August 2025.

=== League table ===
Pos	Team	Pld	W	D	L	GF	GA	GD	Pts
6	Malut United	34	15	8	11	68	53	+15	53 (Note: Head-to-head points: Bhayangkara Presisi 9, Malut United 6, Dewa United Banten 3.)
7	Dewa United Banten	34	16	5	13	44	37	+7	53
8	Bali United	34	14	9	11	57	48	+9	51
9	Arema	34	13	9	12	53	47	+6	48
10	Persita	34	13	6	15	38	37	+1	45 (Note: Head-to-head points: Persita 6, PSIM 0.)

Source: Super League 2025–26
Rules for classification: 1) Points; 2) Head-to-head points; 3) Head-to-head goal difference; 4) Head-to-head goals scored; 5) Goal difference; 6) Goals scored; 7) Fair-play points; 8) Draw.

=== Results summary ===
Overall								Home						Away					
Pld	W	D	L	GF	GA	GD	Pts	W	D	L	GF	GA	GD	W	D	L	GF	GA	GD
34	14	9	11	57	48	+9	51	6	6	5	26	18	+8	8	3	6	31	30	+1

Source: Soccerway

=== Results by round ===
Round	1	2	3	4	5	6	7	9	10	11	12	13	14	15	8 (Note: The match was originally scheduled for 2 October 2025, but was postponed as a form of full support for the Indonesia national football team in the fourth round of the 2026 FIFA World Cup qualification.)	16	17	18	19	20	21	22	23	24	25	26	27	28	29	30	31	32	33	34
Ground	H	A	A	H	A	H	A	A	H	H	A	H	A	A	H	H	A	H	A	H	H	A	H	A	A	H	A	H	A	H	A	H	H	A
Result	D	D	L	W	D	L	W	W	D	L	L	D	W	W	D	W	W	D	L	L	L	D	D	W	L	W	L	W	W	W	L	L	W	W
Position	9	12	14	8	9	14	11	8	8	10	10	11	11	7	8	8	8	8	8	8	10	11	11	9	10	10	10	9	8	8	8	8	8	8
Points	1	2	2	5	6	6	9	12	13	13	13	14	17	20	21	24	27	28	28	28	28	29	30	33	33	36	36	39	42	45	45	45	48	51

Source: Super League
A = Away; H = Home; W = Win; D = Draw; L = Loss; P = Postponed

=== Matches ===
The league fixtures were released on 15 July 2025.

Bali United's score is shown first in each case.

Bali United in the 2025–26 Super League
Date	Venue	Opponents	Score	Bali United scorers	Att.	Ref.
10 August 2025	Kapten I Wayan Dipta, Gianyar (H)	Persik	1–1	Kopitović	10,302	
15 August 2025	Gelora Kie Raha, Ternate (A)	Malut United	3–3	Goppel (2), Irfan	4,703	
23 August 2025	Gelora Bung Tomo, Surabaya (A)	Persebaya	2–5	Kopitović, Irfan	10,200	
30 August 2025	Kapten I Wayan Dipta, Gianyar (H)	Madura United	1–0	Mustafić	11,323	
14 September 2025	Jakarta International, North Jakarta (A)	Persija	1–1	Mustafić	29,389	
20 September 2025	Kapten I Wayan Dipta, Gianyar (H)	PSIM	1–3	Mustafić	6,530	
26 September 2025	Haji Agus Salim, Padang (A)	Semen Padang	3–1	Kopitović, Reyner, Rahmat	4,100	
19 October 2025	Gelora Bumi Kartini, Jepara (A)	Persijap	2–1	Agung, Bruijn	4,561	
25 October 2025	Kapten I Wayan Dipta, Gianyar (H)	Persita	0–0		4,262	
1 November 2025	Kapten I Wayan Dipta, Gianyar (H)	Persib	0–1		14,514	
7 November 2025	Sumpah Pemuda, Bandar Lampung (A)	Bhayangkara Presisi	1–2	Andhika	3,260	
23 November 2025	Kapten I Wayan Dipta, Gianyar (H)	Persis	0–0		3,811	
30 November 2025	Segiri, Samarinda (A)	Borneo Samarinda	1–0	Agung	8,246	
22 December 2025	Maguwoharjo, Sleman (A)	PSBS	3–0	Receveur, Kopitović, Goppel	0	
29 December 2025	Kapten I Wayan Dipta, Gianyar (H)	Dewa United Banten	0–0		3,885	
4 January 2026	Kapten I Wayan Dipta, Gianyar (H)	Arema	1–0	Agung	8,501	
9 January 2026	Gelora B.J. Habibie, Parepare (A)	PSM	2–0	Mustafić, Goppel	2,225	
24 January 2026	Kapten I Wayan Dipta, Gianyar (H)	Semen Padang	3–3	Raven, Mustafić, Goppel	4,195	
30 January 2026	Brawijaya, Kediri (A)	Persik	2–3	Firly (o.g.), João Ferrari	2,772	
7 February 2026	Kapten I Wayan Dipta, Gianyar (H)	Persebaya	1–3	Bruijn	12,163	
15 February 2026	Kapten I Wayan Dipta, Gianyar (H)	Persija	0–1		9,811	
23 February 2026	Sultan Agung, Bantul (A)	PSIM	3–3	Goppel, Receveur, Irfan	5,983	
28 February 2026	Kapten I Wayan Dipta, Gianyar (H)	Persijap	0–0		0 (Note: Bali United were sanctioned with two home matches to be played behind closed doors following a decision by the PSSI Disciplinary Committee.)	
6 March 2026	Kanjuruhan, Malang (A)	Arema	4–3	Yachida (2), Campos, Betinho (o.g.)	4,125	
12 March 2026	Manahan, Surakarta (A)	Persis	0–3		7,131	
6 April 2026	Kapten I Wayan Dipta, Gianyar (H)	PSBS	6–1	Yachida, João Ferrari (2), Campos, Bruijn, Kopitović	0	
12 April 2026	Gelora Bandung Lautan Api, Bandung (A)	Persib	2–3	Yachida, Bruijn	28,932	
19 April 2026	Kapten I Wayan Dipta, Gianyar (H)	Malut United	4–1	Yachida, João Ferrari, Kopitović, Goppel	3,734	
23 April 2026	Banten International, Serang (A)	Persita	1–0	Campos	304	
27 April 2026	Kapten I Wayan Dipta, Gianyar (H)	PSM	2–0	Campos, Irfan	3,088	
5 May 2026	Gelora Bangkalan, Bangkalan (A)	Madura United	0–2		749	
11 May 2026	Kapten I Wayan Dipta, Gianyar (H)	Borneo Samarinda	2–3	Yachida, Caxambu (o.g.)	5,485	
17 May 2026	Kapten I Wayan Dipta, Gianyar (H)	Bhayangkara Presisi	4–1	Kopitović (2), Irfan, Tito	7,357	
22 May 2026	Banten International, Serang (A)	Dewa United Banten	1–0	Agung	993	

== Statistics ==
=== Appearances and goals ===
No.	Pos	Nat	Player	Total		Super League	
No.	Pos	Nat	Player	Apps	Goals	Apps	Goals
1	GK	(Netherlands) NED	Mike Hauptmeijer	34	0	34	0
2	DF	(Brazil) BRA	João Ferrari	29	4	28+1	4
4	DF	(Indonesia) IDN	Kadek Arel	30	0	23+7	0
5	DF	(Indonesia) IDN	Bagas Adi Nugroho	16	0	11+5	0
6	MF	(Australia) AUS	Brandon Wilson	16	0	10+6	0
7	MF	(Netherlands) NED	Thijmen Goppel	34	7	34	7
8	MF	(Netherlands) NED	Jordy Bruijn	20	4	16+4	4
9	FW	(Montenegro) MNE	Boris Kopitović	32	8	29+3	8
10	MF	(Luxembourg) LUX	Mirza Mustafić	18	5	13+5	5
14	MF	(Netherlands) NED	Tim Receveur	31	2	31	2
16	DF	(Indonesia) IDN	Rizky Dwi Febrianto	22	0	11+11	0
17	MF	(Japan) JPN	Teppei Yachida	17	6	16+1	6
18	MF	(Indonesia) IDN	Kadek Agung	31	4	26+5	4
19	FW	(Indonesia) IDN	Jens Raven	24	1	1+23	1
24	DF	(Indonesia) IDN	Ricky Fajrin	31	0	31	0
33	DF	(Indonesia) IDN	Made Andhika	15	1	8+7	1
41	MF	(Indonesia) IDN	Irfan Jaya	22	5	15+7	5
42	MF	(Indonesia) IDN	Maouri Simon	17	0	2+15	0
47	MF	(Indonesia) IDN	Rahmat Arjuna	30	0	19+11	0
55	MF	(Indonesia) IDN	Made Tito	14	1	1+13	1
77	DF	(Indonesia) IDN	Yusuf Meilana	6	0	2+4	0
91	MF	(Indonesia) IDN	Rahmat	15	1	3+12	1
92	MF	(Indonesia) IDN	Reyner Barusu	4	1	3+1	1
99	MF	(Costa Rica) CRC	Diego Campos	12	4	7+5	4
Players left the club during the season
11	MF	(Indonesia) IDN	Yabes Roni	1	0	0+1	0

- Source: Match results
- Ordered by player's number.

=== Disciplinary record ===
No.	Pos	Nat	Player	Total			Super League		
No.	Pos	Nat	Player	Yellow card	Second yellow card	Red card	Yellow card	Second yellow card	Red card
1	GK	(Netherlands) NED	Mike Hauptmeijer	4	0	0	4	0	0
2	DF	(Brazil) BRA	João Ferrari	4	0	2	4	0	2
4	DF	(Indonesia) IDN	Kadek Arel	3	0	0	3	0	0
5	DF	(Indonesia) IDN	Bagas Adi Nugroho	5	0	0	5	0	0
6	MF	(Australia) AUS	Brandon Wilson	5	0	0	5	0	0
7	MF	(Netherlands) NED	Thijmen Goppel	1	0	0	1	0	0
8	MF	(Netherlands) NED	Jordy Bruijn	2	0	0	2	0	0
9	FW	(Montenegro) MNE	Boris Kopitović	7	0	0	7	0	0
10	MF	(Luxembourg) LUX	Mirza Mustafić	2	0	1	2	0	1
14	MF	(Netherlands) NED	Tim Receveur	7	1	0	7	1	0
16	DF	(Indonesia) IDN	Rizky Dwi Febrianto	5	0	0	5	0	0
17	MF	(Japan) JPN	Teppei Yachida	1	0	0	1	0	0
18	MF	(Indonesia) IDN	Kadek Agung	4	0	0	4	0	0
19	FW	(Indonesia) IDN	Jens Raven	2	0	0	2	0	0
24	DF	(Indonesia) IDN	Ricky Fajrin	7	0	0	7	0	0
33	DF	(Indonesia) IDN	Made Andhika	4	0	0	4	0	0
41	MF	(Indonesia) IDN	Irfan Jaya	1	0	0	1	0	0
42	MF	(Indonesia) IDN	Maouri Simon	1	0	0	1	0	0
47	MF	(Indonesia) IDN	Rahmat Arjuna	4	0	0	4	0	0
77	DF	(Indonesia) IDN	Yusuf Meilana	1	0	0	1	0	0
99	MF	(Costa Rica) CRC	Diego Campos	3	0	0	3	0	0

- Source: Match results
- Ordered by player's number.
- (yellow card) = Number of bookings; (second yellow card) = Number of sending offs after a second yellow card; (red card) = Number of sending offs by a direct red card.

== Transfers ==
=== Transfers in ===
Date from	Pos.	Name	From	Fee	Ref.
24 June 2025	DF	(Brazil) João Ferrari	PSIS	Free transfer	
25 June 2025	DF	(Indonesia) Rizky Dwi Febrianto	Persis	Free transfer	
28 June 2025	MF	(Netherlands) Thijmen Goppel	(Germany) Wehen Wiesbaden	Free transfer	
30 June 2025	GK	(Netherlands) Mike Hauptmeijer	(Netherlands) PEC Zwolle	Free transfer	
13 July 2025	FW	(Indonesia) Jens Raven	(Netherlands) Dordrecht	Free transfer	
14 July 2025	MF	(Netherlands) Tim Receveur	(Netherlands) Almere City	Undisclosed	
15 July 2025	MF	(Luxembourg) Mirza Mustafić	(Bosnia and Herzegovina) Sarajevo	Free transfer	
31 July 2025	GK	(Indonesia) Dikri Yusron	Gresik United	Free transfer	
18 August 2025	MF	(Netherlands) Jordy Bruijn	(Netherlands) Heracles Almelo	Undisclosed	
23 December 2025	MF	(Japan) Teppei Yachida	(Japan) RB Omiya Ardija	Free transfer	
21 January 2026	MF	(Costa Rica) Diego Campos	(Costa Rica) Alajuelense	Free transfer	

=== Transfers out ===
Date from	Pos.	Name	To	Fee	Ref.
1 June 2025	GK	(Brazil) Adilson Maringá	(Malta) Valletta (Note: Joined on 22 June 2025.)	Free transfer	
1 June 2025	MF	(Japan) Mitsuru Maruoka	(Japan) Basara Hyōgo (Note: Joined on 31 July 2025.)	Free transfer	
1 June 2025	DF	(Thailand) Elias Dolah	(Thailand) Buriram United (Note: Joined on 7 July 2025.)	Free transfer	
1 June 2025	MF	(Indonesia) Luthfi Kamal	Persikad (Note: Joined on 24 August 2025.)	Free transfer	
1 June 2025	FW	(Indonesia) Taufik Hidayat	Garudayaksa (Note: Joined on 28 August 2025.)	Free transfer	
1 June 2025	MF	(Indonesia) Sidik Saimima	Persis (Note: Joined on 29 June 2025.)	Free transfer	
1 June 2025	FW	(Brazil) Everton	Garudayaksa (Note: Joined on 28 August 2025.)	Free transfer	
1 June 2025	MF	(Cameroon) Privat Mbarga	Dewa United Banten (Note: Joined on 7 July 2025.)	Free transfer	
1 June 2025	GK	(Indonesia) Komang Aryantara	Deltras	Free transfer	
7 June 2025	DF	(Indonesia) Novri Setiawan	Persik (Note: Joined on 21 June 2025.)	Free transfer	
11 June 2025	DF	(Indonesia) Ryuji Utomo	Persita (Note: Redeem after loan.)	Free transfer	
18 June 2025	DF	(Indonesia) Ardi Idrus	Bhayangkara Presisi (Note: Joined on 26 June 2025.)	Free transfer	
18 June 2025	MF	(Indonesia) Tegar Infantrie	Persita (Note: Joined on 8 July 2025.)	Free transfer	
1 July 2025	MF	(Indonesia) Gede Sunu	Persekat (Note: Joined on 1 January 2026.)	Free transfer	
1 July 2025	DF	(Indonesia) Kadek Lanang	Persipal (Note: Joined on 10 January 2026.)	Free transfer	
1 July 2025	MF	(Indonesia) Nyoman Adi	Free agent	End of contract	
29 July 2025	GK	(Indonesia) Rakasurya Handika	Bhayangkara Presisi	Free transfer	

=== Loans in ===
Start date	Pos.	Name	From	End date	Ref.
20 January 2026	DF	(Indonesia) Yusuf Meilana	Persik	End of season	

=== Loans out ===
Start date	Pos.	Name	To	End date	Ref.
26 August 2025	MF	(Indonesia) Dillan Rinaldi	Persikad	End of season	
26 August 2025	DF	(Indonesia) Komang Tri	Garudayaksa	End of season	
26 August 2025	DF	(Indonesia) Komang Dedi	Perseden	End of season (Note: Recalled after Perseden’s campaign ended.)	
20 January 2026	MF	(Indonesia) Yabes Roni	Persis	End of season	
27 January 2026	MF	(Indonesia) Ananta Krisna	Persiba	End of season	
21 February 2026	MF	(Indonesia) Nathan Ari	Persekat	End of season	

== Awards ==
- Super League Best XI: João Ferrari
