= 2022–23 Bali United F.C. season =

Indonesian football club season

Bali United
2022–23 season
- Chairman: Pieter Tanuri
- Head coach: Stefano Cugurra
- Stadium: Kapten I Wayan Dipta Stadium (until September 2022); Sultan Agung Stadium (in January 2023); Maguwoharjo Stadium (from February 2023)
- Liga 1: 5th
- Piala Indonesia: Cancelled
- AFC Cup: Group stage
- Top goalscorer: League: Ilija Spasojević (17); All: Ilija Spasojević; Privat Mbarga (17)
- Highest home attendance: 13,754 (vs Arema, 13 August 2022)
- Lowest home attendance: 5,161 (vs Dewa United, 10 September 2022) (Matches played behind closed doors are not included)
Home colours	Away colours	Third colours

The 2022–23 season was the eighth season of competitive association football and the seventh season in the Liga 1 played by Bali United Football Club, a professional football club based in Gianyar, Bali, Indonesia. Their 1st-place finish in 2021–22, mean it is their seventh successive season in Liga 1.

Coming into the season, Bali United were the two-time reigning Liga 1 champions. They also qualified for the AFC Cup group stage. This season was Bali United's fourth with head coach Stefano Cugurra.

== Pre-season and friendlies ==
=== Friendlies ===
Friendlies match details
Date	Opponent	Venue	Result	Scorers
4 June 2022 – 20:00	PSS	Sleman (A)	2–1	Pacheco, Spasojević
5 June 2022 – 16:00	Persis	Solo (A)	2–2	Lerby, Pellu

=== Indonesia President's Cup ===
Indonesia President's Cup match details
Date	Round	Opponent	Venue	Result	Scorers	Attendance	Referee
12 June 2022 – 21:30	Group stage	Persib	Bandung (N)	1–1	Novri	15,652	Fariq Hitaba
16 June 2022 – 21:30	Group stage	Bhayangkara	Bandung (N)	1–2	Novri	473	Hamim Thohari
20 June 2022 – 21:30	Group stage	Persebaya	Soreang (N)	1–0	Ramdani	0	Aprisman Aranda

== Match results ==
=== Liga 1 ===
Pos	Team	Pld	W	D	L	GF	GA	GD	Pts	Qualification or relegation
3	Persib	34	19	5	10	54	50	+4	62	
4	Borneo Samarinda	34	16	9	9	64	40	+24	57	
5	Bali United	34	16	6	12	67	53	+14	54	Qualification for the additional play-offs for AFC Club Competition and Qualification for the 2023–24 AFC Champions League Preliminary Round 1
6	Persebaya	34	15	7	12	52	45	+7	52	
7	Bhayangkara	34	15	6	13	53	44	+9	51 (Note: Head-to-head results: Madura United 1–0 Bhayangkara; Bhayangkara 4–0 Madura United.)	

Source: BRI Liga 1 2022–23
Rules for classification: 1) Points; 2) Head-to-head points; 3) Head-to-head goal difference; 4) Head-to-head goals scored; 5) Head-to-head away goals scored; 6) Goal difference; 7) Goals scored; 8) Fair-play points; 9) Draw.
Notes:

Liga 1 match details
Date	Week	Opponent	Venue	Result	Scorers	Attendance	Referee	Position
23 July 2022 – 21:00	1	Persija	Gianyar (H)	1–0	Pacheco	11,022	Fariq Hitaba	7
29 July 2022 – 17:00	2	PSM	Parepare (A)	0–2		18,436	Gedion F. Dapaherang	9
4 August 2022 – 21:30	3	RANS Nusantara	Gianyar (H)	3–2	Spasojević (2), Pacheco	7,376	Yudi Nurcahya	6
13 August 2022 – 21:30	4	Arema	Gianyar (H)	1–2	Mbarga	13,754	Faulur Rosy	8
18 August 2022 – 17:30	5	Barito Putera	Martapura (A)	2–1	Mbarga, Jajang	8,199	Moch Adung	6
23 August 2022 – 16:30	6	Persib	Bandung (A)	3–2	Mbarga, Spasojević, Rahmat	7,927	M. Erfan Efendi	5
27 August 2022 – 17:00	7	Persik	Gianyar (H)	4–0	Irfan, Spasojević, Éber, Lerby	6,096	Faulur Rosy	4
2 September 2022 – 17:00	8	Persebaya	Surabaya (A)	1–0	Mbarga	20,321	Thoriq Alkatiri	3
10 September 2022 – 16:30	9	Dewa United	Gianyar (H)	6–0	Mbarga, Haudi, Novri, Spasojević (3)	5,161	Marjukih	2
15 September 2022 – 21:30	10	Persis	Surakarta (A)	0–2		13,050	Juhandri Setiana	3
30 September 2022 – 21:30	11	Persikabo 1973	Gianyar (H)	1–2	Tupamahu	6,439	Fariq Hitaba	5
5 December 2022 – 19:50	12	Persita	Surakarta (A)	3–2	Rahmat, Éber (2)	0	Ruli	2
8 December 2022 – 19:15	13	Bhayangkara	Surakarta (H)	3–0	Hargianto (o.g.), Pacheco, Mbarga	0	Tommi Manggopa	2
12 December 2022 – 19:15	14	Madura United	Sleman (A)	3–1	Mbarga (2), Pacheco	0	Sigit Budiyanto	1
15 December 2022 – 16:15	15	Borneo Samarinda	Bantul (H)	1–3	Lerby	0	Thoriq Alkatiri	2
19 December 2022 – 21:15	16	PSS	Surakarta (H)	1–2	Rahmat	0	Aprisman Aranda	4
22 December 2022 – 19:30	17	PSIS	Surakarta (A)	3–0	Rahmat (2), Mbarga	0	Yudi Nurcahya	2
15 January 2023 – 16:30	18	Persija	Bekasi (A)	2–3	Spasojević (2)	22,990	Thoriq Alkatiri	4
20 January 2023 – 17:00	19	PSM	Bantul (H)	2–2	Éber, Spasojević	0	Sance Lawita	5
25 January 2023 – 19:30	20	RANS Nusantara	Cibinong (A)	4–4	Spasojević, Irfan, Sute, Rahmat	2,475	Oki Dwi Putra	6
5 February 2023 – 19:30	22	Barito Putera	Sleman (H)	1–2	Fadil	0	Agus Fauzan Arifin	6
10 February 2023 – 18:00	23	Persib	Sleman (H)	1–1	Mbarga	0	Fariq Hitaba	6
14 February 2023 – 16:00	24	Persik	Kediri (A)	1–1	Spasojević	1,110	Heru Cahyono	6
18 February 2023 – 17:00	25	Persebaya	Sleman (H)	4–0	Éber, Ridho (o.g.), Mbarga, Spasojević	0	Nendi Rohaendi	6
22 February 2023 – 16:00	26	Dewa United	Tangerang (A)	2–1	Mbarga, Rahmat	1,210	Dwi Purba	4
27 February 2023 – 18:00	27	Persis	Sleman (H)	3–1	Spasojević, Tito, Yabes	0	Yudi Nurcahya	4
3 March 2023 – 18:00	28	Persikabo 1973	Cibinong (A)	1–2	Fadil	841	Pipin Indra Pratama	4
7 March 2023 – 18:00	29	Persita	Sleman (H)	1–1	Spasojević	0	Ruli	5
11 March 2023 – 18:00	30	Bhayangkara	Cikarang (A)	1–3	Mbarga	616	Yudi Nurcahya	6
16 March 2023 – 18:00	31	Madura United	Sleman (H)	1–1	Éber	0	Dwi Purba	6
27 March 2023 – 21:30	21	Arema	South Jakarta (A)	3–1	Spasojević, Mbarga, Yabes	0	Cahya Sugandi	5
3 April 2023 – 21:30	32	Borneo Samarinda	Samarinda (A)	1–5	Mbarga	5,403	Oki Dwi Putra	5
7 April 2023 – 21:30	33	PSS	Sleman (A)	0–2		7,583	Faulur Rosy	5
12 April 2023 – 21:30	34	PSIS	Sleman (H)	3–2	Spasojević, Éber, Mbarga	0	Bangkit Sanjaya	5

=== AFC Cup ===
Pos	Team	Pld	W	D	L	GF	GA	GD	Pts	Qualification
1	(Malaysia) Kedah Darul Aman	3	2	0	1	9	4	+5	6 (Note: Head-to-head standings: Tied on head-to-head points.; Head-to-head goal difference: Kedah Darul Aman: +2, Visakha FC –1, Bali United –1.; Head-to-head goals scored: Visakha FC 6, Bali United 4.)	Zonal semi-finals
2	(Cambodia) Visakha FC	3	2	0	1	8	8	0	6	
3	(Indonesia) Bali United (H)	3	2	0	1	5	5	0	6	
4	(Philippines) Kaya F.C.–Iloilo	3	0	0	3	2	7	−5	0	

Source: AFC
Rules for classification: Tiebreakers
(H) Hosts
Notes:

AFC Cup match details
Date	Round	Opponent	Venue	Result	Scorers	Attendance	Referee
24 June 2022 – 21:00	Group stage	(Malaysia) Kedah Darul Aman	Gianyar (N)	2–0	Ngah (o.g.), Rahmat	9,832	(Uzbekistan) Akhrol Risqullaev
27 June 2022 – 17:00	Group stage	(Cambodia) Visakha	Gianyar (N)	2–5	Irfan, Mbarga	5,669	(Maldives) Mohamed Javiz
30 June 2022 – 17:00	Group stage	(Philippines) Kaya–Iloilo	Gianyar (N)	1–0	Jajang	5,069	(Saudi Arabia) Shukri Al Hanfosh

== Player details ==
=== Appearances and goals ===
No.	Pos	Nat	Player	Total		Liga 1		Piala Indonesia		AFC Cup	
No.	Pos	Nat	Player	Apps	Goals	Apps	Goals	Apps	Goals	Apps	Goals
1	GK	(Indonesia) IDN	Nadeo Argawinata	19	0	17	0	0	0	2	0
5	DF	(Indonesia) IDN	Haudi Abdillah	15	1	12+3	1	0	0	0	0
6	MF	(Iraq) IRQ	Brwa Nouri	31	0	27+1	0	0	0	3	0
7	MF	(Indonesia) IDN	Sidik Saimima	7	0	4+3	0	0	0	0	0
8 (28)	DF	(Indonesia) IDN	Ardi Idrus	21	0	12+9	0	0	0	0	0
9	FW	(Indonesia) IDN	Ilija Spasojević	30	17	27	17	0	0	3	0
10	MF	(Brazil) BRA	Éber Bessa	33	7	29+1	7	0	0	3	0
11	MF	(Indonesia) IDN	Yabes Roni	28	2	10+16	2	0	0	0+2	0
13	DF	(Indonesia) IDN	Gunawan Dwi Cahyo	0	0	0	0	0	0	0	0
14	MF	(Indonesia) IDN	Fadil Sausu (captain)	19	2	10+7	2	0	0	1+1	0
15	MF	(Indonesia) IDN	Hendra Bayauw	8	0	0+8	0	0	0	0	0
16	MF	(Indonesia) IDN	Hariono	9	0	6+3	0	0	0	0	0
17 (4)	MF	(Indonesia) IDN	Ahmad Agung	13	0	2+11	0	0	0	0	0
18	MF	(Indonesia) IDN	I Kadek Agung Widnyana	0	0	0	0	0	0	0	0
19	MF	(Indonesia) IDN	Rizky Pellu	17	0	10+4	0	0	0	1+2	0
20	FW	(Indonesia) IDN	Lerby Eliandry	14	2	5+8	2	0	0	0+1	0
21	GK	(Indonesia) IDN	Rakasurya Handika	0	0	0	0	0	0	0	0
22	MF	(Indonesia) IDN	Novri Setiawan	29	1	24+4	1	0	0	0+1	0
23	DF	(Indonesia) IDN	Ryuji Utomo	8	0	6+2	0	0	0	0	0
24	DF	(Indonesia) IDN	Ricky Fajrin	36	0	29+4	0	0	0	3	0
26	DF	(Indonesia) IDN	Komang Tri	3	0	0+3	0	0	0	0	0
29	MF	(Indonesia) IDN	Sandi Sute	7	1	4+3	1	0	0	0	0
32	DF	(Indonesia) IDN	Leonard Tupamahu	9	1	6+1	1	0	0	2	0
33	DF	(Indonesia) IDN	I Made Andhika Wijaya	13	0	5+5	0	0	0	3	0
34	DF	(Brazil) BRA	Wellington Carvalho	13	0	13	0	0	0	0	0
37	MF	(Cameroon) CMR	Privat Mbarga	37	17	34	16	0	0	3	1
41	MF	(Indonesia) IDN	Irfan Jaya	24	3	11+10	2	0	0	2+1	1
44	DF	(Indonesia) IDN	Kadek Arel Priyatna	3	0	3	0	0	0	0	0
47	GK	(Indonesia) IDN	Gerri Mandagi	0	0	0	0	0	0	0	0
55	MF	(Indonesia) IDN	I Made Tito Wiratama	6	1	5+1	1	0	0	0	0
66	DF	(Indonesia) IDN	I Gede Agus Mahendra	7	0	2+5	0	0	0	0	0
67	GK	(Indonesia) IDN	I Komang Aryantara	0	0	0	0	0	0	0	0
73	DF	(Indonesia) IDN	Jajang Mulyana	21	2	16+3	1	0	0	1+1	1
76	FW	(Indonesia) IDN	Kadek Dimas Satria	2	0	0+2	0	0	0	0	0
77	MF	(Indonesia) IDN	Ramdani Lestaluhu	18	0	4+11	0	0	0	1+2	0
88	GK	(Indonesia) IDN	Muhammad Ridho	19	0	17+1	0	0	0	1	0
90	MF	(Indonesia) IDN	Rahmat Arjuna	8	0	3+5	0	0	0	0	0
91	MF	(Indonesia) IDN	Rahmat	27	8	8+16	7	0	0	1+2	1
Players transferred out during the season
43	DF	(Brazil) BRA	Willian Pacheco	17	4	14	4	0	0	3	0

- Source: Match results
- Ordered by player's number.
- No. in bracket is the player's number in AFC Competitions.

=== Disciplinary record ===
No.	Pos	Nat	Player	Total			Liga 1			Piala Indonesia			AFC Cup		
No.	Pos	Nat	Player	Yellow card	Second yellow card	Red card	Yellow card	Second yellow card	Red card	Yellow card	Second yellow card	Red card	Yellow card	Second yellow card	Red card
1	GK	(Indonesia) IDN	Nadeo Argawinata	1	1	0	1	1	0	0	0	0	0	0	0
5	DF	(Indonesia) IDN	Haudi Abdillah	6	1	0	6	1	0	0	0	0	0	0	0
6	MF	(Iraq) IRQ	Brwa Nouri	10	0	1	10	0	1	0	0	0	0	0	0
8	DF	(Indonesia) IDN	Ardi Idrus	1	0	0	1	0	0	0	0	0	0	0	0
9	FW	(Indonesia) IDN	Ilija Spasojević	3	0	0	3	0	0	0	0	0	0	0	0
10	MF	(Brazil) BRA	Éber Bessa	13	0	0	12	0	0	0	0	0	1	0	0
11	MF	(Indonesia) IDN	Yabes Roni	4	0	0	4	0	0	0	0	0	0	0	0
14	MF	(Indonesia) IDN	Fadil Sausu	4	0	0	4	0	0	0	0	0	0	0	0
16	MF	(Indonesia) IDN	Hariono	4	0	0	4	0	0	0	0	0	0	0	0
17	MF	(Indonesia) IDN	Ahmad Agung	3	0	0	3	0	0	0	0	0	0	0	0
19	MF	(Indonesia) IDN	Rizky Pellu	4	0	0	3	0	0	0	0	0	1	0	0
22	MF	(Indonesia) IDN	Novri Setiawan	4	0	1	4	0	1	0	0	0	0	0	0
23	DF	(Indonesia) IDN	Ryuji Utomo	2	0	0	2	0	0	0	0	0	0	0	0
24	DF	(Indonesia) IDN	Ricky Fajrin	3	0	0	3	0	0	0	0	0	0	0	0
29	MF	(Indonesia) IDN	Sandi Sute	1	1	0	1	1	0	0	0	0	0	0	0
32	DF	(Indonesia) IDN	Leonard Tupamahu	2	0	0	2	0	0	0	0	0	0	0	0
33	DF	(Indonesia) IDN	I Made Andhika Wijaya	2	1	0	1	1	0	0	0	0	1	0	0
34	DF	(Brazil) BRA	Wellington Carvalho	4	0	0	4	0	0	0	0	0	0	0	0
37	MF	(Cameroon) CMR	Privat Mbarga	3	0	0	3	0	0	0	0	0	0	0	0
41	MF	(Indonesia) IDN	Irfan Jaya	1	0	0	1	0	0	0	0	0	0	0	0
55	MF	(Indonesia) IDN	I Made Tito Wiratama	2	0	0	2	0	0	0	0	0	0	0	0
73	DF	(Indonesia) IDN	Jajang Mulyana	1	0	0	1	0	0	0	0	0	0	0	0
77	MF	(Indonesia) IDN	Ramdani Lestaluhu	3	0	0	3	0	0	0	0	0	0	0	0
88	GK	(Indonesia) IDN	Muhammad Ridho	1	0	0	1	0	0	0	0	0	0	0	0
91	MF	(Indonesia) IDN	Rahmat	3	0	0	3	0	0	0	0	0	0	0	0
Players transferred out during the season
43	DF	(Brazil) BRA	Willian Pacheco	7	1	0	6	1	0	0	0	0	1	0	0

- Source: Match results
- Ordered by player's number.
- (yellow card) = Number of bookings; (second yellow card) = Number of sending offs after a second yellow card; (red card) = Number of sending offs by a direct red card.

== Transfers ==
=== Transfers in ===
Date	Pos.	Name	From	Fee	Ref.
8 April 2022	MF	(Indonesia) Ahmad Agung	Persik (Note: Redeem after loan.)	Undisclosed	
25 April 2022	GK	(Indonesia) I Komang Aryantara	Youth sector	Promoted	
4 May 2022	GK	(Indonesia) Muhammad Ridho	Madura United	Free transfer	
5 May 2022	MF	(Indonesia) Hendra Bayauw	Persikabo 1973	Free transfer	
9 May 2022	DF	(Indonesia) Jajang Mulyana	Bhayangkara	Free transfer	
10 May 2022	DF	(Indonesia) Ardi Idrus	Persib	Free transfer	
10 May 2022	MF	(Indonesia) Novri Setiawan	Persija	Free transfer	
10 May 2022	MF	(Indonesia) Ramdani Lestaluhu	Persija	Undisclosed	
24 May 2022	MF	(Indonesia) I Made Tito Wiratama	Youth sector	Promoted	
3 January 2023	GK	(Indonesia) Gerri Mandagi	PSBS	Free transfer	
5 January 2023	DF	(Brazil) Wellington Carvalho	(Brazil) Tombense	Free transfer	
5 January 2023	MF	(Indonesia) Sandi Sute	RANS Nusantara	Free transfer	
11 January 2023	DF	(Indonesia) Ryuji Utomo	Persija	Free transfer	
12 January 2023	DF	(Indonesia) Kadek Arel Priyatna	Youth sector	Promoted	

=== Transfers out ===
Date	Pos.	Name	To	Fee	Ref.
2 April 2022	DF	(Indonesia) Michael Orah	Sulut United (Note: Joined on 14 May 2022.)	Free transfer	
2 April 2022	MF	(Indonesia) Muhammad Taufiq	Persik (Note: Joined on 21 April 2022.)	Free transfer	
2 April 2022	DF	(Indonesia) Dias Angga Putra	Dewa United (Note: Joined on 12 April 2022.)	Free transfer	
4 April 2022	GK	(Indonesia) Samuel Reimas	Semen Padang (Note: Joined on 5 June 2022.)	Free transfer	
4 April 2022	GK	(Indonesia) Wawan Hendrawan	RANS Nusantara (Note: Joined on 21 April 2022.)	Free transfer	
23 April 2022	DF	(Indonesia) Gavin Kwan Adsit	Persis (Note: Joined on 15 May 2022.)	Free transfer	
6 May 2022	MF	(Indonesia) Stefano Lilipaly	Borneo Samarinda (Note: Joined on 9 May 2022.)	Free transfer	
3 June 2022	MF	(Indonesia) Fahmi Al-Ayyubi	Dewa United	Undisclosed	
5 January 2023	DF	(Brazil) Willian Pacheco	Free agent	Released	
