= Kadek =

Kadek is a masculine given name. Notable people with the name include:

- Kadek Agung (born 1998), Indonesian football midfielder
- Kadek Arel (born 2005), Indonesian football centre-back
- Kadek Devie (born 1985), Indonesian actress and model
- Kadek Raditya (born 1999), Indonesian football centre-back
- Kadek Dimas Satria (born 2001), Indonesian football striker
