= Devie =

Devie or DEVIE can refer to:

- Kadek Devie (born 1985), Indonesian actress and model
- Viersen (UN/LOCODE:DEVIE), town in North Rhine-Westphalia, Germany
