= Rakasurya Handika =

Indonesian footballer (born 2000)

Personal information
- Full name: Rakasurya Handika Aryabagasakti
- Date of birth: 13 June 2000 (age 26)
- Place of birth: Semarang, Indonesia
- Height: 1.80 m (5 ft 11 in)
- Position: Goalkeeper

Team information
- Current team: Persijap Jepara (on loan from Borneo Samarinda)
- Number: 26

Youth career
- 2017: PPLP Jawa Tengah
- 2018–2019: Bali United

Senior career*
Years	Team	Apps	(Gls)
2018–2025	Bali United	1	(0)
2024–2025	→ Nusantara United (loan)	12	(0)
2025–2026	Bhayangkara	1	(0)
2026–	Borneo Samarinda	0	(0)
2026–	→ Persijap Jepara (loan)	1	(0)
- * Club domestic league appearances and goals as of 22:00, 20 September 2026 (UTC) ‡ National team caps and goals as of 07:34, 6 June 2019 (UTC)

Rakasurya Handika Aryabagasakti (born on 13 June 2000) is an Indonesian professional footballer who plays as a goalkeeper for Super League club Persijap Jepara, on loan from Borneo Samarinda.

== Career ==
=== Bali United ===
On 23 April 2018, Rakasurya officially signed a year contract with Bali United. In his first season, he was first-choice goalkeeper for Bali United U-19 in 2018 Liga 1 U-19. Bali United registered him for 2019 Liga 1 to completes the quota of U-23 players.

He finally made his long-awaited debut on the last match of 2021–22 Liga 1.

== Career statistics ==
=== Club ===
As of 3 November 2026.

Club	Season	League		Cup		Continental		Other		Total	
Club	Season	Apps	Goals	Apps	Goals	Apps	Goals	Apps	Goals	Apps	Goals
Bali United	2021–22	1	0	0	0	–		0	0	1	0
Bali United	2022–23	0	0	0	0	0	0	1 (Note: Appearances in Indonesia President's Cup)	0	1	0
Bali United	2023–24	0	0	0	0	0	0	0	0	0	0
Nusantara United (loan)	2024–25	12	0	0	0	–		0	0	12	0
Bhayangkara	2025–26	1	0	0	0	–		0	0	1	0
Borneo Samarinda	2026–27	0	0	0	0	–		0	0	0	0
Persijap Jepara (loan)	2026–27	1	0	0	0	–		1 (Note: Appearances in I-League Cup)	0	2	0
Career total		15	0	0	0	0	0	2	0	17	0
