= Maouri Simon =

Indonesian footballer (born 2006)

Personal information
- Full name: Maouri Ananda Yves Ramli Simon
- Date of birth: 9 November 2006 (age 20)
- Place of birth: Tabanan, Indonesia
- Height: 1.77 m (5 ft 10 in)
- Position: Midfielder

Team information
- Current team: Bali United
- Number: 42

Youth career
- SSB Badak Putra
- 2021–2024: Bali United

Senior career*
Years	Team	Apps	(Gls)
2024–	Bali United	17	(0)

International career^{‡}
2024–2025	Indonesia U20	5	(1)
- * Club domestic league appearances and goals ‡ National team caps and goals as of 22 May 2026

Maouri Ananda Yves Ramli Simon (born 9 November 2006) is an Indonesian professional footballer who plays as a midfielder for Super League club Bali United.

== Club career ==
Born in Tabanan, Maouri is a youth product of Bali United. He made his official debut on 30 April 2024 in 2023–24 Liga 1 match against Persita Tangerang.

== International career ==
In August 2024, he was called up to the Indonesia U20 squad for an exhibition tournament in South Korea alongside his two teammates, as preparation for AFC U-20 Asian Cup qualifier.

== Personal life ==
Maouri was born to French father and Indonesian mother.
