= Dikri Yusron =

Indonesian footballer

Personal information
- Full name: Dikri Yusron Afafa
- Date of birth: 8 January 1995 (age 31)
- Place of birth: Ciamis, Indonesia
- Height: 1.78 m (5 ft 10 in)
- Position: Goalkeeper

Team information
- Current team: Semen Padang
- Number: 31

Youth career
- 2012: Deportivo Indonesia
- 2013–2015: Persib Bandung
- 2016: Persela Lamongan

Senior career*
Years	Team	Apps	(Gls)
2017–2018	Sriwijaya	3	(0)
2019–2021	Badak Lampung	2	(0)
2021–2024	Persik Kediri	63	(0)
2024–2025	Gresik United	7	(0)
2025–2026	Bali United	0	(0)
2026–	Semen Padang	0	(0)

International career
2013–2014	Indonesia U19	1	(0)
- * Club domestic league appearances and goals as of 23:05, 16 February 2025 (UTC)

Dikri Yusron Afafa (born 8 January 1995) is an Indonesian professional footballer who plays as a goalkeeper for Championship club Semen Padang.

== Club career ==
=== Sriwijaya ===
He was signed for Sriwijaya to play in Liga 1 in the 2017 season. Yusron made his league debut on 25 October 2017 in a match against PS TNI at the Pakansari Stadium, Cibinong.

=== Badak Lampung ===
In 2019, Yusron signed a year contract with Liga 1 club Badak Lampung. He made his league debut on 24 May 2019 in a match against PSM Makassar at the Andi Mattalatta Stadium, Makassar.

=== Persik Kediri ===
On 10 March 2021, he signed one-year contract with Liga 1 club Persik Kediri. He made his debut on 27 August, as a starter in a 1–0 defeat to Bali United at the Gelora Bung Karno Stadium, Jakarta.

== International career ==
In 2014, Dikri Yusron represented the Indonesia U-19, in the 2014 AFF U-19 Youth Championship.

== Career statistics ==
=== Club ===
As of match played 16 February 2025

Club	Season	League			Cup		Continental		Other		Total	
Club	Season	Division	Apps	Goals	Apps	Goals	Apps	Goals	Apps	Goals	Apps	Goals
Sriwijaya	2017	Liga 1	2	0	0	0	–		0	0	2	0
Sriwijaya	2018	Liga 1	1	0	0	0	–		0	0	1	0
Sriwijaya	Total		3	0	0	0	–		0	0	3	0
Badak Lampung	2019	Liga 1	2	0	0	0	–		0	0	2	0
Badak Lampung	2020	Liga 2	0	0	0	0	–		0	0	0	0
Badak Lampung	Total		2	0	0	0	–		0	0	2	0
Persik Kediri	2021–22	Liga 1	18	0	0	0	–		3 (Note: Appearances in Menpora Cup)	0	21	0
Persik Kediri	2022–23	Liga 1	20	0	0	0	–		2 (Note: Appearances in Indonesia President's Cup)	0	22	0
Persik Kediri	2023–24	Liga 1	25	0	0	0	–		0	0	25	0
Gresik United	2024–25	Liga 2	7	0	0	0	–		0	0	7	0
Bali United	2025–26	Super League	0	0	0	0	–		0	0	0	0
Career total			75	0	0	0	0	0	5	0	80	0

== Honours ==
=== Club ===
Sriwijaya

- East Kalimantan Governor Cup: 2018
