= Gerri Mandagi =

Indonesian footballer

Personal information
- Full name: Gerri Martin Milliam Mandagi
- Date of birth: 12 June 1983 (age 43)
- Place of birth: Tomohon, Indonesia
- Height: 1.80 m (5 ft 11 in)
- Position: Goalkeeper

Senior career*
Years	Team	Apps	(Gls)
2007–2008	Persiwa Wamena	4	(0)
2008–2009	PSIR Rembang	15	(0)
2009–2010	Persiwa Wamena	2	(0)
2010–2011	PSS Sleman	13	(0)
2012–2014	Persepam Madura Utama	10	(0)
2015	Persiram Raja Ampat	0	(0)
2016–2019	Mitra Kukar	40	(0)
2020–2022	Persipura Jayapura	1	(0)
2022	PSBS Biak	1	(0)
2023	Bali United	0	(0)
2023–2024	PSBS Biak	1	(0)
2024–2025	Persibo Bojonegoro	13	(0)
2025–2026	Sriwijaya	3	(0)
- * Club domestic league appearances and goals as of 11 November 2025 (UTC)

Gerri Martin Milliam Mandagi (born 12 June 1983) is an Indonesian professional footballer who plays as a goalkeeper.

== Club career ==
=== Mitra Kukar ===
Gerri Mandagi was signed for Mitra Kukar to play in Indonesia Soccer Championship A in 2016. He quickly rose as the team's starting goalkeeper, appearing in 40 matches in four seasons.

=== Persipura Jayapura ===
Mandagi in 2020 signed for Persipura Jayapura to play in Liga 1 in the 2020 season. This season was suspended on 27 March 2020 due to the COVID-19 pandemic. The season was abandoned and was declared void on 20 January 2021. Mandagi made his league debut on 28 August 2021 in a match against Persita Tangerang at the Pakansari Stadium, Cibinong.

== Honours ==
PSBS Biak

- Liga 2: 2023–24
