= Bali Utd TV =

Bali United Television
Ownership
- Owner: Bali United

History
- Launched: 19 October 2016; 8 years ago

Links
- Website: Website

Bali United Television, also known as Bali Utd TV, is an online streaming based TV channel, entirely dedicated to the Indonesian professional football club Bali United The channel offers Bali United fans home matches in Indonesian league and friendlies, as well as other themed programming.

This sport channel is operating in a sector of the Kapten I Wayan Dipta Stadium, since 24 September 2016. Before grand launching, Bali Utd TV already broadcast live Trofeo Bali Celebest 2016 and Bali Soeratin Cup final 2016 between Bali United U-17 vs Putra Tresna at Kapten I Wayan Dipta Stadium, Gianyar.

== Programs ==
- Bali United 24/7
- What's news
- Grebek Semeton
- Goal Skill Save
- Bali United Challenge
- Behind the Pitch
- Tanya-tanya yuk!
- How to Kick
- Lady Dewata Corner

== Personnel ==
- Producer: Hendra Bayu Dwiputra
- Cameramen & Editor:
  - Yudistira Achmad Nugroho
  - Genta Pradana
  - Galih Seta Dananjati
