= Wellington Carvalho =

Brazilian footballer (born 1993)

Personal information
- Full name: Wellington Carvalho dos Santos
- Date of birth: 15 February 1993 (age 33)
- Place of birth: Duque de Caxias, Brazil
- Height: 1.85 m (6 ft 1 in)
- Position: Centre-back

Team information
- Current team: ABC

Youth career
- Fluminense

Senior career*
Years	Team	Apps	(Gls)
2012–2016	Fluminense	2	(0)
2014	→ Ceará (loan)	14	(0)
2016	→ Tombense (loan)	10	(1)
2017–2023	Tombense	52	(3)
2018–2019	→ CRB (loan)	45	(0)
2020–2021	→ Ponte Preta (loan)	36	(0)
2021	→ Coritiba (loan)	22	(3)
2022	→ CRB (loan)	26	(1)
2023	Bali United	13	(0)
2023	Paysandu	11	(1)
2024	Amazonas	0	(0)
2024	CSA	10	(2)
2025	AA Aparecidense	10	(1)
2026–	ABC	29	(3)
- * Club domestic league appearances and goals as of 18 November 2026

Wellington Carvalho dos Santos (born 15 February 1993) is a Brazilian professional footballer who plays as a centre-back for Campeonato Brasileiro Série D club ABC.

== Early life ==
Carvalho was born in Duque de Caxias, Brazil.

== Career ==
=== Fluminense ===
Wellington Carvalho made his league debut against Corinthians on 20 May 2012.

=== First loan to Ceará ===
Wellington Carvalho joined Ceara in 2014. He made his league debut against Paraná on 16 September 2014.

=== Second loan to Ceará ===
During his second spell at the club, Wellington Carvalho made his league debut against Itapipoca on 29 January 2015.

=== First loan to Tombense ===
Wellington Carvalho joined Tombense in 2016. During his loan spell, he made his league debut against Atlético Mineiro on 6 March 2016. He scored his first goal for the club against Guarani MG on 12 March 2016, scoring in the 84th minute.

=== Tombense ===
Wellington Carvalho joined Tombense permanently in 2017. He made his league debut against Tupi Football Club on 29 January 2017. He scored his first league goal for the club against Esporte Clube Democrata on 4 March 2017, scoring in the 45th+4th minute.

=== First loan to CRB ===
Wellington Carvalho joined CRB on loan in 2018. He made his league debut against Guarani FC on 7 September 2018. He scored his first goal for the club in the Copa do Brasil against Goiás on 22 February 2019, scoring in the 47th minute.

=== Ponte Preta ===
Wellington Carvalho joined Ponte Preta on loan in December 2019. He made his league debut against Palmeiras on 8 February 2020. Wellington Carvalho renewed his contract with Ponte Preta until January 2021.

=== Coritiba ===
Wellington Carvalho joined Coritiba in 2021. He made his league debut against Maringá on 23 March 2021. He scored his first goal for the club against Paraná on 24 April 2021, scoring in the 47th minute.

=== Second loan to CRB ===
During his second spell with CRB, Wellington Carvalho made his league debut against Alagoinhas Atlético Clube on 10 March 2022. He scored his first goal for the club against Tombense on 8 October 2022, scoring in the 63rd minute.

=== Bali United ===
Wellington Carvalho made his league debut against PSM Makassar on 20 January 2023.

=== Paysandu ===
Wellington Carvalho made his league debut against Amazonas on 8 July 2023. He scored his first goal for the club against CSA on 24 July 2023, scoring in the 21st minute.

=== CSA ===
Wellington Carvalho made his league debut against ASA on 8 February 2024. He scored his first goal for the club against Penedense on 24 February 2024, scoring in the 27th minute.

== International career ==
Carvalho was a Brazil youth international.

== Style of play ==
Carvalho mainly operates as a centre-back.
