= Made Tito =

Indonesian footballer

I Made Tito Wiratama
Personal information
- Full name: I Made Tito Wiratama
- Date of birth: 31 July 2003 (age 23)
- Place of birth: Denpasar, Indonesia
- Height: 1.75 m (5 ft 9 in)
- Position: Midfielder

Team information
- Current team: Bali United
- Number: 55

Youth career
- 2015–2017: SSB Mandala United
- 2018–2022: Bali United

Senior career*
Years	Team	Apps	(Gls)
2022–	Bali United	41	(4)
- * Club domestic league appearances and goals as of 22:30, 10 October 2026 (UTC)

I Made Tito Wiratama (born 31 July 2003) is an Indonesian professional footballer who plays as a midfielder for Super League club Bali United.

== Early life ==
Tito was born in Denpasar, Indonesia.

== Club career ==
=== Bali United ===
Tito played for the Bali United youth academy. On 24 May 2022, Tito officially signed a contract with Bali United. He made his unofficial debut against Persebaya in the 2022 Indonesia President's Cup where he replaced Yabes Roni in the 70th minute. And he finally made his official debut on 18 February 2023 in 2022–23 Liga 1 match against Persebaya Surabaya. He performed brilliantly in his debut match, he managed to give two assists for Bali United, the two assists came on the third goal scored by Privat Mbarga and the fourth goal scored by Ilija Spasojević in the second half. He managed to score his first goal with the club when Bali United beat Persis 3–1 on 27 February 2023.

== Career statistics ==
=== Club ===
As of 10 October 2026

Club	Season	League			Cup		Continental		Other		Total	
Club	Season	Division	Apps	Goals	Apps	Goals	Apps	Goals	Apps	Goals	Apps	Goals
Bali United	2022–23	Liga 1	6	1	0	0	–		1	0	7	1
Bali United	2023–24	Liga 1	9	1	0	0	1	0	0	0	10	1
Bali United	2024–25	Liga 1	11	1	0	0	0	0	3	0	14	1
Bali United	2025–26	Super League	14	1	0	0	–		0	0	14	1
Bali United	2026–27	Super League	1	0	0	0	–		0	0	1	0
Career total			41	4	0	0	1	0	4	0	46	3

== Honours ==
Bali United U-18

- Elite Pro Academy Liga 1 U-18: 2021

Individual

- Liga 1 Young Player of the Month: August 2024, September 2024
