= Brandon Wilson (soccer) =

Soccer player (born 1997)

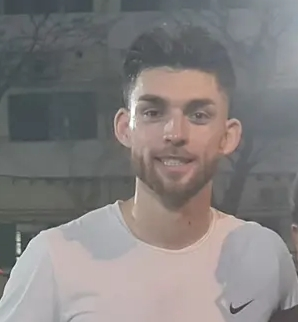
- Wilson in 2023

Personal information
- Full name: Brandon James Wilson
- Date of birth: 28 January 1997 (age 29)
- Place of birth: Gaborone, Botswana
- Height: 1.85 m (6 ft 1 in)
- Position: Defensive midfielder

Team information
- Current team: Bali United
- Number: 6

Youth career
- 2013–2016: Burnley

Senior career*
Years	Team	Apps	(Gls)
2016	Burnley	0	(0)
2016	→ Stockport County (loan)	7	(1)
2016–2019	Perth Glory NPL	17	(2)
2016–2020	Perth Glory	45	(0)
2020	Wellington Phoenix	4	(0)
2020	→ Wellington Phoenix Reserves	2	(0)
2020–2021	Perth Glory	17	(1)
2021	SJK	13	(0)
2021	SJK Akatemia	1	(0)
2022	Newcastle Jets	11	(0)
2022–2023	Lampang	11	(0)
2023	SHB Da Nang	7	(0)
2023–2024	Hanoi FC	10	(0)
2024–	Bali United	50	(0)

International career
2015	Australia U20	1	(0)
2017–2019	Australia U23	7	(2)
- * Club domestic league appearances and goals as of 20 September 2026

Brandon James Wilson (born 28 January 1997) is a professional soccer player who plays as a defensive midfielder for Super League club Bali United. Born in Botswana, Wilson played internationally for Australia at youth level.

Wilson moved to Australia at a young age and later moved to England to play youth football for Burnley before making his senior debut for Stockport County. In 2016, he returned to Australia to play for Perth Glory.

== Early life ==
Wilson was born in Gaborone, Botswana, to English parents and grew up in Doncaster, England, from the age of two. He moved to Western Australia at age ten.

== Club career ==
Wilson joined Burnley in 2013. He was loaned to Stockport County in 2016.

In July 2016, Wilson returned to Western Australia signing with Perth Glory to play in the A-League. He made his professional debut for Perth Glory on 10 August 2016 in a 2–0 win against Brisbane Roar in the 2016 FFA Cup. Mainly playing as a midfielder, Wilson showed his versatility in December by filling in as the starting right back against Melbourne Victory.

On 28 February 2022, Newcastle Jets announced Wilson had signed with the club on a short-term deal until the end of the 2021–22 A-League Men.

== International career ==
In September 2015, Wilson was named in the Australian under-20 side to travel to Laos for 2016 AFC U-19 Championship qualification. He made his debut for the side in a win over Laos. He is also eligible to represent Botswana and England at senior level.

In November 2019, he was one of four players suspended by the Australia U23 due to "unprofessional conduct".

In November 2023, he received a call up for Botswana national team but has not yet been able to play due to issues gaining Botswana citizenship and receiving a Botswana passport as an Australian citizen, with Botswana currently not allowing dual citizenship. Despite this, Wilson has participated in training camps with the squad.

== Honours ==
Perth Glory

- A-League: Premiers 2018–19
