= I Made Pasek Wijaya =

Indonesian footballer

Pasek Wijaya
Personal information
- Full name: I Made Pasek Wijaya
- Date of birth: 5 July 1969 (age 57)
- Place of birth: Denpasar, Indonesia
- Height: 1.72 m (5 ft 8 in)
- Position: Midfielder

Team information
- Current team: Pelita Jaya

Senior career*
Years	Team	Apps	(Gls)
1986–2001	Pelita Jaya		
2002–2003	Persegi Gianyar		
2004	Persekaba Badung		

International career
1989–1999	Indonesia	14	(4)

Managerial career
- 2008–2012: Pelita Jaya (assistant coach)
- 2012–2016: Arema Cronus (assistant coach)
- 2017–2018: Bali United (assistant coach)
- 2019–: Bali United U-18
- * Club domestic league appearances and goals

I Made Pasek Wijaya (born 5 July 1969 in Denpasar, Bali) is a former player for the Indonesia national football team, he played normally as a midfielder. His height is 172 centimetres (68 in).

Wijaya made several appearances for the Indonesia national football team.

== National Team Career ==
- 1984: Asian Student Cup
- 1985: U-17 National Team
- 1991–1993: U-23 National Team
- 1997–1998: Senior National Team
- 1999–2000: Senior National Team

== Honours ==
Pelita Jaya

- Galatama: 1988–89, 1990, 1993–94

Indonesia

- SEA Games bronze medal: 1989
