= Gede Agus =

Indonesian footballer (born 2002)

I Gede Agus Mahendra
Personal information
- Full name: I Gede Agus Mahendra
- Date of birth: 1 June 2002 (age 24)
- Place of birth: Denpasar, Indonesia
- Height: 1.75 m (5 ft 9 in)
- Position: Left-back

Team information
- Current team: Perseden Denpasar

Youth career
- 2017: SSB Mandala United
- 2018–2019: Bali United

Senior career*
Years	Team	Apps	(Gls)
2021–2026	Bali United	10	(0)
2024–2025	→ Nusantara United (loan)	5	(0)
2026–	Perseden Denpasar	0	(0)
- * Club domestic league appearances and goals as of 23:00, 15 February 2025 (UTC)

I Gede Agus Mahendra (born on 1 June 2002) is an Indonesian professional footballer who plays as a left-back for Liga Nusantara club Perseden Denpasar.

== Career ==
=== Bali United ===
On 24 February 2021, Mahendra officially signed a contract with Bali United. He made his debut on the last match of 2021–22 Liga 1.

== Career statistics ==
=== Club ===
As of 15 February 2025.

Club	Season	League		Cup		Continental		Other		Total	
Club	Season	Apps	Goals	Apps	Goals	Apps	Goals	Apps	Goals	Apps	Goals
Bali United	2021–22	1	0	0	0	–		0	0	1	0
Bali United	2022–23	7	0	0	0	0	0	1 (Note: Appearances in Indonesia President's Cup)	0	8	0
Bali United	2023–24	2	0	0	0	0	0	0	0	2	0
Bali United	2024–25	0	0	0	0	0	0	0	0	0	0
Nusantara United (loan)	2024–25	5	0	0	0	–		0	0	5	0
Career total		15	0	0	0	0	0	1	0	16	0
