= Éber Bessa =

Brazilian footballer (born 1992)

Personal information
- Full name: Éber Henrique Ferreira de Bessa
- Date of birth: 21 March 1992 (age 34)
- Place of birth: Belo Horizonte, Brazil
- Height: 1.66 m (5 ft 5 in)
- Position: Attacking midfielder

Team information
- Current team: Persita Tangerang
- Number: 10

Senior career*
Years	Team	Apps	(Gls)
2011–2015	Cruzeiro	0	(0)
2012	→ Nacional-MG (loan)	8	(1)
2013	→ Villa Nova (loan)	3	(0)
2014	→ Phuket (loan)	0	(0)
2015–2018	Marítimo	80	(5)
2015–2018	Marítimo B	4	(1)
2018–2020	Vitória de Setúbal	62	(4)
2020–2021	Botafogo	7	(0)
2021	Nacional	14	(0)
2021–2024	Bali United	94	(15)
2024	Alverca	4	(0)
2025–	Persita Tangerang	41	(8)
- * Club domestic league appearances and goals as of 31 October 2026

Éber Henrique Ferreira de Bessa (born 21 March 1992) is a Brazilian professional footballer who plays as an attacking midfielder for Super League club Persita Tangerang.

== Career ==
On 24 January 2015, Éber Bessa signed with Marítimo. On 5 May 2018, after over three years at the club, Bessa left Marítimo.

On 8 September 2021, he signed with Indonesian Liga 1 club Bali United. He made his debut on 18 September 2021 at Indomilk Arena, coming as a substitute, he provided an assist in a 2–2 league draw against Persib Bandung.

== Honours ==
Bali United

- Liga 1: 2021–22

Individual

- Primeira Liga Goal of the Month: August 2018
- Liga 1 Team of the Season: 2021–22
- APPI Indonesian Football Award Best 11: 2021–22
