= Johnny Jansen =

Dutch footballer and manager

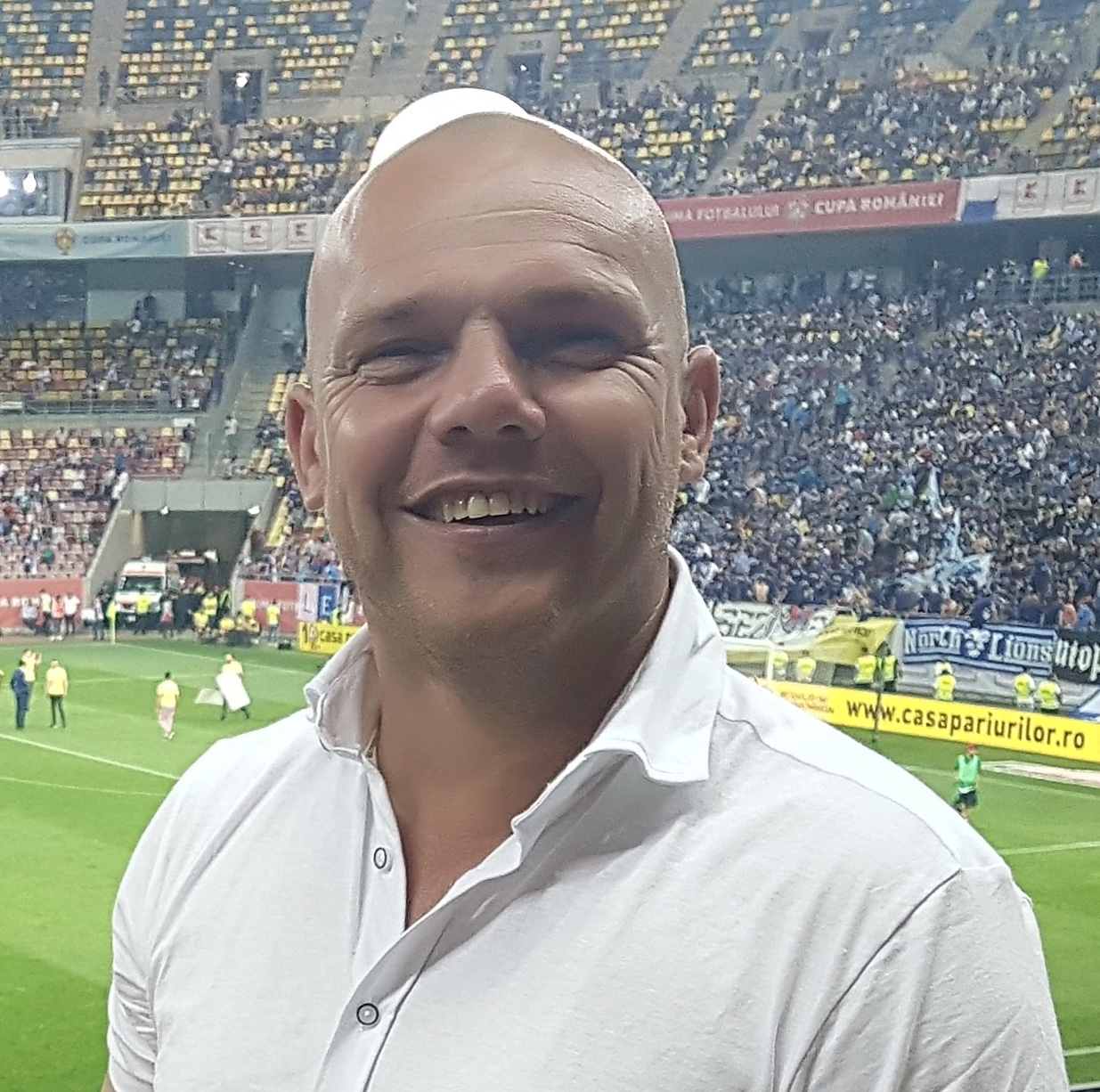
- Jansen in 2018

Personal information
- Date of birth: 2 March 1975 (age 51)
- Place of birth: Heerenveen, Netherlands

Team information
- Current team: Bali United (head coach)

Youth career
- 1979–1991: Olyphia
- 1991–1995: Heerenveen

Senior career*
Years	Team	Apps	(Gls)
1995–1998	Heerenveen	0	(0)
1998–2000	Veendam	26	(1)
2000–2005	MSC		
2005–2012	Olyphia		

Managerial career
- 2019–2022: Heerenveen
- 2023: Safa
- 2023–2025: PEC Zwolle
- 2025–: Bali United
- * Club domestic league appearances and goals

Johnny Jansen (born 2 March 1975) is a Dutch professional football coach and former player who is the head coach of Liga 1 club Bali United.

== Playing career ==
Jansen began his playing career with Heerenveen, but had to cut his playing career short due to being diagnosed with diabetes, spending his later playing career in amateur leagues in the Netherlands.

== Managerial career ==
In 2000, he began working with Heerenveen as an academy manager, and in 2014 was appointed assistant manager. On 3 June 2019, he was named the manager of the Eredivisie club.

In April 2023, Jansen was appointed head coach of Lebanese Premier League side Safa. Only two months later, in June 2023, Jansen returned to the Netherlands, signing for PEC Zwolle as head coach for two years.

After completing two years at PEC Zwolle, he continued his coaching career in Indonesia, managing Liga 1 club Bali United.

== Managerial statistics ==
As of match played 20 September 2026

Managerial record by team and tenure
Team	Nat.	From	To	Record					Ref.
Team	Nat.	From	To	G	W	D	L	Win %	Ref.
Heerenveen	(Netherlands)	10 April 2019	24 January 2022	96	32	28	36	33.33	
PEC Zwolle	(Netherlands)	1 July 2023	30 June 2025	70	19	20	31	27.14	
Bali United	(Indonesia)	1 July 2025	Present	37	16	9	12	43.24	
Career Total				203	67	57	79	33.00	
