= Thijmen Goppel =

Dutch footballer (born 1997)

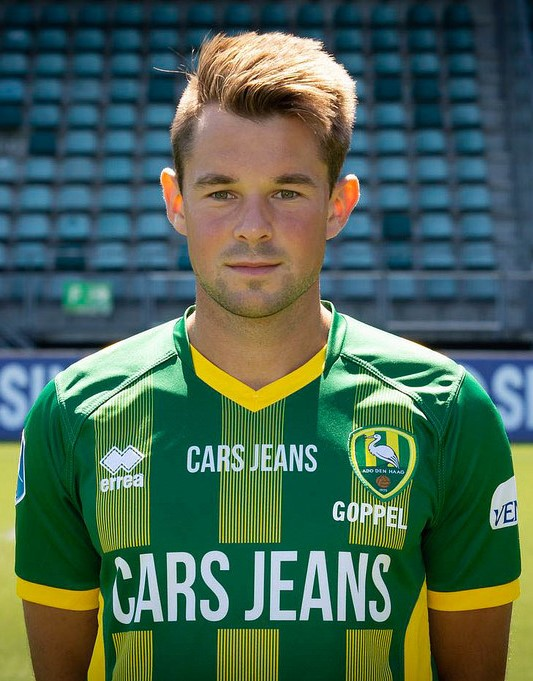
- Goppel with ADO Den Haag in 2018

Personal information
- Date of birth: 16 February 1997 (age 29)
- Place of birth: Leiderdorp, Netherlands
- Height: 1.80 m (5 ft 11 in)
- Position: Winger

Team information
- Current team: Bali United
- Number: 7

Youth career
- 2002–2007: SV Alkmania
- 2007–2014: Alphense Boys
- 2014–2017: NEC

Senior career*
Years	Team	Apps	(Gls)
2018–2020	ADO Den Haag	40	(0)
2019–2020	→ MVV (loan)	25	(1)
2020–2021	Roda JC	36	(6)
2021–2025	Wehen Wiesbaden	119	(16)
2025–	Bali United	37	(9)
- * Club domestic league appearances and goals as of 20 September 2026

Thijmen Goppel (born 16 February 1997) is a Dutch professional footballer who plays as a winger for Super League club Bali United.

== Career ==
=== Early years ===
A winger, Goppel began his career in his native Netherlands with SV Alkmania and Alphense Boys, before entering the youth system at NEC in 2014. After three years, where he was unable to break through to the first team, he was scooped up by ADO Den Haag.

=== ADO Den Haag ===
Goppel made the first professional appearance of his career early in the 2017–18 season, where he was substituted in for the injured Elson Hooi in the 90th minute of a match against VVV-Venlo. He had an immediate impact, as stood for the assist to Bjørn Johnsen's goal, which would secure a 2–0 win for ADO. ADO head coach Alfons Groenendijk brought Goppel with the first team on training camp to the Turkish Belek during the winter break. During this training camp he signed his first professional contract with ADO, keeping him in De Hofstad until summer 2020. Goppel would eventually go on to make 15 appearances in that season, and won the ADO Talent of the Season award for his performances in the 2017–18 season.

==== MVV (loan) ====
On 2 September 2019, Goppel signed a one-year loan deal with Dutch second division side, MVV Maastricht.

=== Roda JC ===
In June 2020 he moved to Roda JC Kerkrade. He appeared consistently during the season for the club. A year after coming to Kerkrade, Goppel wanted to complete a transfer to German 3. Liga club SV Wehen Wiesbaden, but according to the player, Roda's asking price was too high.

=== Wehen Wiesbaden ===
In July 2021, Goppel nonetheless signed for Wehen Wiesbaden on a two-year contract. He made his debut on 26 July in a 0–0 league draw against SC Freiburg II. On 3 September, Goppel scored his first goal for Wiesbaden in a 4–3 away victory in the 3. Liga against 1. FC Saarbrücken.

=== Bali United ===
On 28 June 2025, Goppel officially signed for Indonesian club Bali United.
