= Kadek Dimas Satria =

Indonesian footballer

Personal information
- Full name: Kadek Dimas Satria Adiputra
- Date of birth: 24 September 2001 (age 25)
- Place of birth: Denpasar, Bali, Indonesia
- Height: 1.82 m (6 ft 0 in)
- Position: Striker

Team information
- Current team: Bali United
- Number: 76

Youth career
- 2018: PS Badung
- 2019–2020: Bali United

Senior career*
Years	Team	Apps	(Gls)
2020–	Bali United	2	(0)
2021	→ PSIM Yogyakarta (loan)	0	(0)
- * Club domestic league appearances and goals as of 11:12, 7 April 2023 (UTC)

Kadek Dimas Satria Adiputra (born 24 September 2001) is an Indonesian professional footballer who plays as a striker for Liga 1 club Bali United.

== Career ==
=== Youth ===
Dimas played for the youth academy of Bali United.

=== Bali United ===
On 23 July 2020, Dimas officially signed his first professional contract with Liga 1 club Bali United after being promoted from the youth team. Dimas made his first-team and league debut for Bali United in a 4–0 win against Persebaya on 18 February 2023 as a substitute for Ilija Spasojević in the 86th minute.

=== PSIM ===
In 2021, he was sent on loan to PSIM.

== International ==
He has been called up for Indonesia national under-19 football team.

== Career statistics ==
=== Club ===
As of 7 April 2023.

Club	Season	League			Cup		Continental		Other		Total	
Club	Season	Division	Apps	Goals	Apps	Goals	Apps	Goals	Apps	Goals	Apps	Goals
Bali United	2022–23	Liga 1	2	0	0	0	–		0	0	2	0
Bali United	2023–24	Liga 1	0	0	0	0	–		0	0	0	0
Career total			2	0	0	0	0	0	0	0	2	0

== Honours ==
=== Club ===
Bali United

- Liga 1: 2021–22

=== Individual ===
- 2019 Liga 1 U-18 top goalscorers
