= Rahmat Arjuna =

Indonesian footballer

Personal information
- Full name: Rahmat Arjuna Reski
- Date of birth: 30 April 2004 (age 22)
- Place of birth: Bulukumba, Indonesia
- Height: 1.71 m (5 ft 7 in)
- Position: Winger

Team information
- Current team: Bali United
- Number: 47

Youth career
- 2021–2022: Bali United

Senior career*
Years	Team	Apps	(Gls)
2022–	Bali United	96	(8)

International career^{‡}
2025–	Indonesia U23	12	(0)
Medal record
Men's football
Representing Indonesia
ASEAN U-23 Championship
Runner-up	2025 Indonesia	Team
- * Club domestic league appearances and goals as of 21:33, 20 September 2026 (UTC) ‡ National team caps and goals as of 12 December 2025

Rahmat Arjuna Reski (born on 30 April 2004) is an Indonesian professional footballer who plays as a winger for Super League club Bali United.

== Career ==
=== Bali United ===
On 4 December 2022, Rahmat was called up to Bali United senior team. He made his debut on 18 February 2023 in 2022–23 Liga 1 match against Persebaya when he replaced Yabes Roni in the 67th minute.

== Career statistics ==
=== Club ===
As of 20 September 2026.

Club	Season	League		Cup		Continental		Other		Total	
Club	Season	Apps	Goals	Apps	Goals	Apps	Goals	Apps	Goals	Apps	Goals
Bali United	2022–23	8	0	0	0	–		0	0	8	0
Bali United	2023–24	24	2	0	0	2	0	0	0	24	2
Bali United	2024–25	31	6	0	0	0	0	3	0	31	6
Bali United	2025–26	30	0	0	0	–		0	0	30	0
Bali United	2026–27	3	0	0	0	–		0	0	3	0
Career total		96	8	0	0	2	0	3	0	101	8

== Honours ==
=== Club ===
Bali United U-18

- Elite Pro Academy Liga 1 U-18: 2021

=== International ===
Indonesia U-23

- ASEAN U-23 Championship runner-up: 2025

=== Individual ===
- Elite Pro Academy Liga 1 U-18 top goalscorers
- Elite Pro Academy Liga 1 U-18 best player
- Liga 1 Goal of the Month: February 2025
