= Tim Receveur =

Dutch footballer (born 1991)

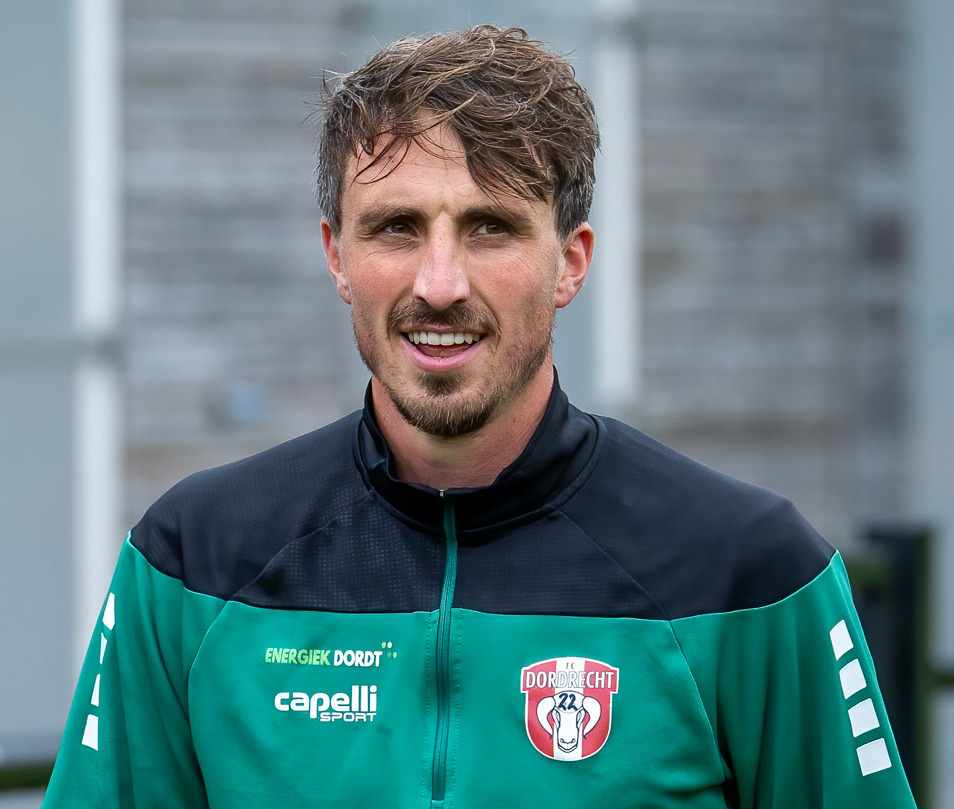
- Receveur with Dordrecht in 2023

Personal information
- Full name: Tim Charles Pieter Receveur
- Date of birth: 30 July 1991 (age 35)
- Place of birth: Amersfoort, Netherlands
- Height: 1.83 m (6 ft 0 in)
- Position: Midfielder

Team information
- Current team: Bali United
- Number: 14

Youth career
- AFC
- 2000–2010: Ajax
- 2010–2011: NAC

Senior career*
Years	Team	Apps	(Gls)
2011–2013	AGOVV	31	(2)
2013–2016	Almere City	63	(5)
2016–2017	VVV	17	(0)
2017–2018	De Graafschap	18	(2)
2018–2023	Almere City	99	(7)
2023	→ Dordrecht (loan)	14	(0)
2023–2024	Dordrecht	28	(0)
2024–2025	Almere City	4	(0)
2025–	Bali United	33	(2)
- * Club domestic league appearances and goals as of 22:21, 20 September 2026 (UTC)

Tim Charles Pieter Receveur (born 30 July 1991) is a Dutch professional footballer who plays as a midfielder for Super League club Bali United. He formerly played for AGOVV Apeldoorn, VVV-Venlo, De Graafschap and Dordrecht.

== Football career ==
Born in Amersfoort, Receveur started playing for AFC before moving to the youth academy of Ajax in 2000, where he subsequently played for 10 years. Afterwards he joined NAC Breda in 2010, where he was appointed team captain of the reserve team, Jong NAC, for the 2010–11 season.

Receveur then moved to AGOVV, where he signed a two-year contract. On 8 August 2011, he made his league debut in the home game against SC Cambuur (2–4). After AGOVV went bankrupt in January 2013, he moved to Almere City FC a month later. At the end of April 2013, he signed a two-year contract there, which he extended for another year afterwards. On 15 May 2015, the midfielder sustained a serious knee injury during the second leg of the promotion play-off game against De Graafschap. Through ten months of injuries, he did not return to play until the end of the 2015–16 season. After the season ended, Receveur, who had become a free agent, moved to VVV-Venlo where he signed a one-year contract with an option for another season. There, he lost the competition in midfield to Danny Post and Clint Leemans and as a result only made 17 league appearances that year, 16 of them as a substitute, as VVV won the Eerste Divisie league title. After one season in Venlo, Receveur moved to De Graafschap where he also signed a one-year contract. With De Graafschap, he won another promotion to the Eredivisie, this time through playoffs. Receveur returned to Almere City in June 2018.

On 27 January 2023, Receveur moved to Dordrecht on loan until the end of the 2022–23 season, and also signed a two-year contract with Dordrect that began in July 2023 after his contract with Almere City expired. Receveur left Dordrecht by mutual consent on 19 July 2024.

In September 2024, Receveur started training with his former club Almere City. Two months later, he signed a contract until the end of the season with the club.

On 14 July 2025, Receuver signed a season long contract with Super League club Bali United.

== Career statistics ==
=== Club ===
As of match played 20 September 2026

Appearances and goals by club, season and competition
Club	Season	League			National Cup		Other		Total	
Club	Season	Division	Apps	Goals	Apps	Goals	Apps	Goals	Apps	Goals
NAC Breda	2010–11	Eredivisie	0	0	0	0	0	0	0	0
AGOVV	2011–12	Eerste Divisie	17	1	1	0	0	0	18	1
AGOVV	2012–13	Eerste Divisie	14	1	0	0	0	0	14	1
AGOVV	Total		31	2	1	0	0	0	32	2
Almere City	2012–13	Eerste Divisie	5	0	0	0	0	0	5	0
Almere City	2013–14	Eerste Divisie	26	2	1	0	0	0	27	2
Almere City	2014–15	Eerste Divisie	28	3	2	0	2 (Note: Appearances in Eerste Divisie promotion play-offs)	0	32	3
Almere City	2015–16	Eerste Divisie	4	0	0	0	4	0	8	0
Almere City	Total		63	5	3	0	6	0	72	5
VVV	2016–17	Eerste Divisie	17	0	0	0	0	0	17	0
De Graafschap	2017–18	Eerste Divisie	18	2	1	0	0	0	19	2
Almere City	2018–19	Eerste Divisie	26	4	2	0	0	0	28	4
Almere City	2019–20	Eerste Divisie	0	0	0	0	0	0	0	0
Almere City	2020–21	Eerste Divisie	33	2	1	0	1	0	35	2
Almere City	2021–22	Eerste Divisie	33	1	1	0	0	0	34	1
Almere City	2022–23	Eerste Divisie	7	0	1	0	0	0	8	0
Almere City	Total		99	7	5	0	1	0	105	7
Dordrecht (loan)	2022–23	Eerste Divisie	14	0	0	0	0	0	14	0
Dordrecht	2023–24	Eerste Divisie	28	0	1	0	2	0	31	0
Dordrecht	Total		42	0	1	0	2	0	45	0
Almere City	2024–25	Eredivisie	4	0	0	0	0	0	4	0
Bali United	2025–26	Super League	31	2	0	0	0	0	31	2
Bali United	2026–27	Super League	2	0	0	0	0	0	2	0
Career total			307	16	10	0	9	0	326	16

== Honours ==
VVV-Venlo

- Eerste Divisie: 2016–17

De Graafschap

- Eerste Divisie playoffs: 2018
