= João Ferrari =

Brazilian footballer (born 1997)

Personal information
- Full name: João Vitor Ferrari Silva
- Date of birth: 25 June 1997 (age 29)
- Place of birth: Naviraí, Brazil
- Height: 1.90 m (6 ft 3 in)
- Position: Centre-back

Team information
- Current team: Bali United
- Number: 2

Youth career
- 2012: Naviraiense
- 2013–2015: Guaicurus

Senior career*
Years	Team	Apps	(Gls)
2017	Operário		
2017–2018	Taubaté		
2019	Operário	1	(0)
2019–2020	Pontaporanense	8	(0)
2020–2021	Operário	6	(0)
2021–2022	Oratory Youths	19	(2)
2022–2024	Qala Saints	37	(7)
2024–2025	PSIS Semarang	34	(2)
2025–	Bali United	29	(4)
- * Club domestic league appearances and goals as of 22 May 2026

João Vitor Ferrari Silva (born 25 June 1997) is a Brazilian professional footballer who plays as a centre-back for Super League club Bali United.

João Ferrari began his football career in Brazil with Guaicurus in 2017. He then continued his career with several other Brazilian clubs, including Operário, Taubaté, and Pontaporanense. After spending several years in Brazil, he chose to continue his football career in Europe in 2021.

He spent three years playing in the Malta with two clubs, Oratory Youths and Qala Saints. Qala Saints was his last club in Malta before moving to PSIS Semarang in Indonesia. During his time in the Maltese league (Gozo Football League), João Ferrari recorded 50 appearances and scored 8 goals.

== Career ==
=== PSIS Semarang ===
João Ferrari was officially introduced by PSIS Semarang on 15 July 2024. He became the sixth foreign player signed by PSIS to strengthen the team for the 2024–25 Liga 1 season. Joao Ferrari joined through a selection process. Ferrari made his league debut on 11 August 2024 as a starter in a 0–1 lose over Persita Tangerang. Six days later, he picked up his first win with PSIS Semarang in his second appearances in a 0–1 away win over Persis Solo.

On 16 February 2025, Ferrari scored his first league goal for PSIS, the opening goal against PSM Makassar in a 1–1 draw at the Jatidiri Stadium. He scored his second league goal for the club on 25 April 2025, in a 2–5 lose against Borneo Samarinda.

=== Bali United ===
Bali United officially announced the signing of João Ferrari as their first foreign recruit for the 2025–26 Super League season. He signed a two-year contract with the club.

== Career statistics ==
=== Club ===
As of match played 12 March 2026

Appearances and goals by club, season and competition
Club	Season	League			National cup (Note: Includes Piala Indonesia)		Continental		Other		Total	
Club	Season	Division	Apps	Goals	Apps	Goals	Apps	Goals	Apps	Goals	Apps	Goals
PSIS Semarang	2024–25	Liga 1	34	2	0	0	0	0	0	0	34	2
PSIS Semarang	Total		34	2	0	0	0	0	0	0	34	2
Bali United	2025–26	Super League	21	1	0	0	0	0	0	0	21	1
Bali United	Total		21	1	0	0	0	0	0	0	21	1
Career total			55	3	0	0	0	0	0	0	55	3

== Honours ==
Individual

- Super League Best XI: 2025–26
