= Komang Tri =

Indonesian footballer

Komang Tri Arta
Personal information
- Full name: Komang Tri Arta Wiguna
- Date of birth: 24 January 2001 (age 25)
- Place of birth: Buleleng, Indonesia
- Height: 1.81 m (5 ft 11 in)
- Position: Centre-back

Team information
- Current team: PSIS Semarang
- Number: 33

Youth career
- 2017: SSB Putra Perkanthi
- 2018: PS Badung
- 2018–2020: Bali United

Senior career*
Years	Team	Apps	(Gls)
2020–2026	Bali United	13	(0)
2023–2024	→ Nusantara United (loan)	14	(2)
2025–2026	→ Garudayaksa (loan)	21	(1)
2026–	PSIS Semarang	9	(0)

International career
2020	Indonesia U19	6	(0)
2021	Indonesia U23	1	(0)
- * Club domestic league appearances and goals as of 21 November 2026

Komang Tri Arta Wiguna (born 24 January 2001) is an Indonesian professional footballer who plays as a centre-back for Championship club PSIS Semarang.

Komang Tri was born in Madenan, Buleleng and played youth football with SSB Putra Perkanthi, PS Badung and Bali United U16s and U18s before starting his professional career with Bali United.

== Club career ==
=== Bali United ===
On 23 July 2020, Komang officially signed his first professional contract with Liga 1 club Bali United after being promoted from the youth team. Komang made his first-team and league debut for Bali United in a 5–0 win against Persiraja on 30 November 2021 as a substitute for Willian Pacheco in the 72nd minute. In a match against Madura United on 9 December, he played the full 90 minutes for the first time in a 1–0 lose in gameweek 16.

== International career ==
In August 2020, Tri Arta was included on Indonesia national under-19 football team 30-man list for Training Center in Croatia. He earned his first under-19 cap on 5 September 2020 in 3–0 loss against Bulgaria U19.

In October 2021, Tri Arta was called up to the Indonesia U23 in an unofficial friendly match against Tajikistan and Nepal and also prepared for 2022 AFC U-23 Asian Cup qualification in Tajikistan by Shin Tae-yong. On 26 October 2021, Tri Arta made his official international debut in an under-23 team when he came on as a substitute in a 2–3 loss against Australia U23 in the 2022 AFC U-23 Asian Cup qualification.

== Career statistics ==
=== Club ===
As of match played 21 November 2026

Appearances and goals by club, season and competition
Club	Season	League			National Cup		Continental		Other		Total	
Club	Season	Division	Apps	Goals	Apps	Goals	Apps	Goals	Apps	Goals	Apps	Goals
Bali United	2020	Liga 1	0	0	0	0	–		0	0	0	0
Bali United	2021–22	Liga 1	3	0	0	0	–		0	0	3	0
Bali United	2022–23	Liga 1	3	0	0	0	0	0	0	0	3	0
Bali United	2023–24	Liga 1	0	0	0	0	0	0	0	0	0	0
Bali United	2024–25	Liga 1	7	0	0	0	0	0	0	0	7	0
Bali United	2025–26	Super League	0	0	0	0	–		0	0	0	0
Nusantara United (loan)	2023–24	Liga 2	14	2	0	0	–		0	0	14	2
Garudayaksa (loan)	2025–26	Championship	21	1	0	0	–		0	0	21	1
PSIS Semarang	2026–27	Championship	9	0	0	0	–		0	0	9	0
Career total			56	3	0	0	0	0	0	0	56	3

== Honours ==
Bali United

- Liga 1: 2021–22

Garudayaksa

- Championship: 2025–26
