= Teppei Yachida =

Japanese footballer (born 2001)

Teppei Yachida 谷内田 哲平
Personal information
- Date of birth: 1 November 2001 (age 25)
- Place of birth: Nagaoka, Niigata, Japan
- Height: 1.70 m (5 ft 7 in)
- Position: Midfielder

Team information
- Current team: Bali United
- Number: 8

Youth career
- 2005–2016: Nagaoka JYFC
- 2017–2019: Teikyo Nagaoka High School

Senior career*
Years	Team	Apps	(Gls)
2020–2024	Kyoto Sanga	43	(0)
2021–2022	→ Tochigi SC (loan)	53	(4)
2024	→ FC Anyang (loan)	7	(1)
2025	RB Omiya Ardija	30	(1)
2026–	Bali United	20	(8)

International career
- Japan U15
- Japan U16
2023	Japan U23	5	(2)
Medal record
Men's football
Representing Japan
Asian Games
Silver medal – second place	2022 Hangzhou	Team
- * Club domestic league appearances and goals as of 20 September 2026

Teppei Yachida (谷内田 哲平, Yachida Teppei; born 1 November 2001) is a Japanese professional footballer who plays as a midfielder for Super League club Bali United.

== Career ==
On 27 December 2024, Yachida joined newly promoted J2 League club RB Omiya Ardija for the 2025 season.

== Career statistics ==
As of match played 4 September 2026

Appearances and goals by club, season and competition
Club	Season	League			National cup (Note: Includes Emperor's Cup)		League cup (Note: Includes J.League Cup)		Other		Total	
Club	Season	Division	Apps	Goals	Apps	Goals	Apps	Goals	Apps	Goals	Apps	Goals
Kyoto Sanga	2020	J2 League	23	0	0	0	0	0	—		23	0
Kyoto Sanga	2021	J2 League	0	0	1	0	0	0	—		1	0
Kyoto Sanga	2023	J1 League	17	0	1	0	6	1	—		24	1
Kyoto Sanga	2024	J1 League	3	0	1	1	1	0	—		5	1
Kyoto Sanga	Total		43	0	3	1	7	1	—		53	2
Tochigi SC (loan)	2021	J2 League	14	3	0	0	0	0	—		14	3
Tochigi SC (loan)	2022	J2 League	39	1	0	0	0	0	—		39	1
Tochigi SC (loan)	Total		53	4	0	0	0	0	0	0	53	4
FC Anyang (loan)	2024	K League 2	7	1	0	0	0	0	—		7	1
RB Omiya Ardija	2025	J2 League	30	1	1	0	2	0	1 (Note: Appearance in J2 League promotion play-offs)	0	34	1
Bali United	2025–26	Super League	17	6	—		—		—		17	6
Bali United	2026–27	Super League	1	2	—		0	0	—		1	2
Bali United	Total		18	8	0	0	0	0	0	0	18	8
Career total			151	13	4	1	9	1	1	0	165	15

== Honours ==
FC Anyang

- K League 2: 2024
