= Mike Hauptmeijer =

Dutch footballer (born 1997)

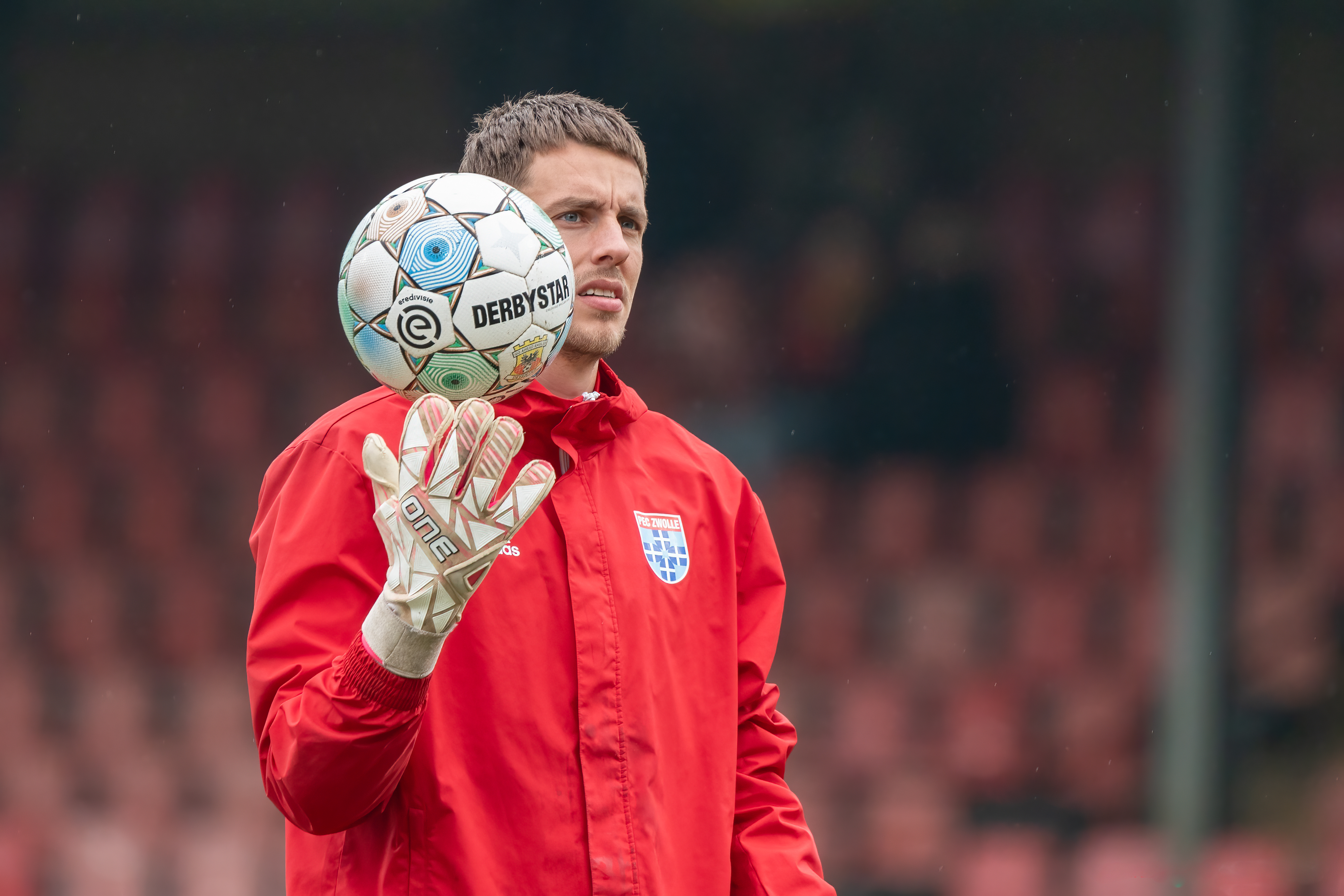
- Hauptmeijer with PEC Zwolle in 2024

Personal information
- Date of birth: 18 March 1997 (age 29)
- Place of birth: Dalfsen, Netherlands
- Height: 1.90 m (6 ft 3 in)
- Position: Goalkeeper

Team information
- Current team: Bali United
- Number: 1

Youth career
- 2006–2018: PEC Zwolle

Senior career*
Years	Team	Apps	(Gls)
2018–2025	PEC Zwolle	9	(0)
2019	→ Achilles '29 (loan)	15	(0)
2025–	Bali United	37	(0)
- * Club domestic league appearances and goals as of 20 September 2026

Mike Hauptmeijer (born 18 March 1997) is a Dutch professional footballer who plays as a goalkeeper for Super League club Bali United.

== Professional career ==
Hauptmeijer joined the PEC Zwolle youth academy at the age of 9, and trained exclusively with their youth academy. He made his professional debut for Zwolle on 3 February 2018 in a 4–0 Eredivisie loss to PSV Eindhoven, as a late substitute after Mickey van der Hart got a red-card in the 42nd minute.

On 31 January 2019, Hauptmeijer was loaned out to Achilles '29.

On 30 June 2025, Hauptmeijer signed a two-season contract with Indonesian Super League club Bali United.

== International career ==
Hauptmeijer has been place on standby for the Netherlands U15s and Netherlands U20s, but hasn't made a formal debut at any level.
