= Kadek Devie =

Indonesian actress

- Born: Ida Ayu Kade Devie Noviana Watie Arnawa; November 7, 1985 (age 40); Bandung, West Java, Indonesia
- Occupations: Actress; model
- Years active: 2003 - present

Ida Ayu Kade Devie Noviana Watie Arnawa (born 7 November 1985), better known as Kadek Devie, is an Indonesian actress and model. She was born in Bandung, West Java, Indonesia.

== Career ==
She started career at entertainment in 2003, when she participated at "Gadis Sampul" election and become one of Top Guest 2003 in Aneka Yess!! Magazine, a famous magazine for teen girls in Indonesia, especially in Jakarta.

== Filmography ==
=== TV Series ===
- Cinta 2020
- Indahnya Karunia-Mu
- Celana Bulu Jeans
- Aku Cemburu (2006)
- Jangan Berhenti Mencintaiku (2005)
- Senandung Masa Puber
- Beningnya Cinta (2010)
- Baruak gadang (2011)

=== TV Movie ===
- Cowok Gue Pendek Bener
- Cowok Gue Pendek Lagi
- Jadikan Aku Pacarmu
- Ku Kejar Cintaku ke Bandung
- Kalo Cinta Ngomong Dong!
- 3 Pelancong Cinta
- Pacar ke 17
- Manajemen Cinta 17
- Cinta Rasa Mocca
- Kawin Gantung
- Jadikan Aku Pacarmu
- Kamulah Cinta
- Hanna & Hilda High Heels
- Buat Gue Jatuh Cinta
- Cinta Tak Bersyarat
- Cinta Tanpa rekayasa
- Cinta Bikin Pusing
- Pacar Setengah Tiang
- Cinta Dikejar Jarum Jam
- Cinta Anak Petinju
- Bajaj Cinta Si Laura
- Pacar Bayaran
- Bu Lurah Idaman Hati

== Endorsements ==
- Fuji Film
- Esia
- Easy Splash Cologne
- Fanbo (icon)
