= Rahmat (footballer) =

Indonesian footballer

M. Rahmat
Personal information
- Full name: Rahmat Syamsuddin Leo
- Date of birth: 28 May 1988 (age 38)
- Place of birth: Takalar, Indonesia
- Height: 1.73 m (5 ft 8 in)
- Position: Winger

Team information
- Current team: Semen Padang
- Number: 91

Senior career*
Years	Team	Apps	(Gls)
2008–2019	PSM Makassar	181	(37)
2020–2026	Bali United	123	(22)
2026–	Semen Padang	1	(0)

International career
2012–2019	Indonesia	4	(0)
- * Club domestic league appearances and goals as of 13 September 2026

Rahmat Syamsuddin Leo (born 28 May 1988 in Takalar, Indonesia), also known as Rahmat (for international matches) or M. Rahmat (when there was another player in his former club with the same name), nicknamed The Flash is an Indonesian professional footballer who plays as a winger for Championship club Semen Padang. He has also played for Indonesian national football team. Like many Indonesians, he was given only one name at birth, but added other names or initials throughout his career for administrative purposes.

== Honours ==
=== Club ===
PSM Makassar

- Piala Indonesia: 2018–19

Bali United

- Liga 1: 2021–22
