= Made Andhika =

Indonesian footballer

Andhika Wijaya
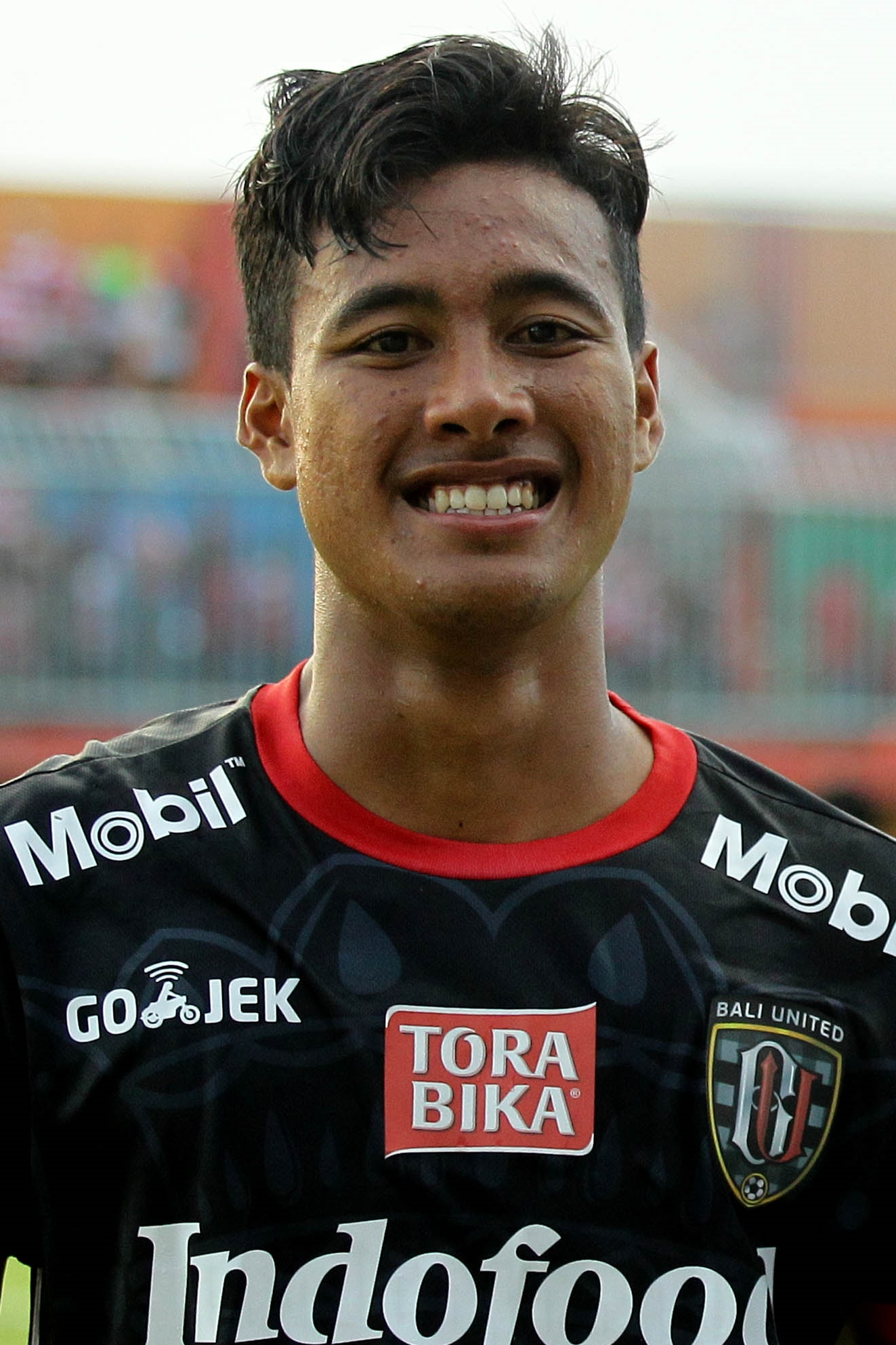
- Andhika playing for Bali United in 2017

Personal information
- Full name: I Made Andhika Pradana Wijaya
- Date of birth: 12 July 1996 (age 30)
- Place of birth: Jakarta, Indonesia
- Height: 1.73 m (5 ft 8 in)
- Position: Right-back

Team information
- Current team: Bhyangkara Presisi (on loan from Bali United)
- Number: 33

Youth career
- 2011–2012: Perseden Denpasar
- 2016: Bali United

Senior career*
Years	Team	Apps	(Gls)
2013–2015	PS Badung	0	(0)
2016–	Bali United	162	(3)
2026–	→ Bhyangkara Presisi (loan)	1	(0)
- * Club domestic league appearances and goals as of 18:00, 5 September 2026 (UTC)

I Made Andhika Pradana Wijaya (born 12 July 1996) is an Indonesian professional footballer who plays as a right-back for Super League club Bhyangkara Presisi, on loan from Bali United.

== Biography ==
I Made Andhika Wijaya was born in Jakarta on 12 July 1996, he is the eldest of three children from a mother named Indah Wijaya. His father, I Made Pasek Wijaya was a former national football player, he is also the nephew of Made Sony Kawiarda, a former Persegi Gianyar coach.

I Made Andhika's professional career began after he became a member of the PS Badung senior team in 2013 after previously a member in Perseden Denpasar. At a young age, he took part in bringing PS Badung promotion to the First Division in 2014. He also once helped bring the Denpasar Porprov team to win a gold medal at the 2015 Bali Porprov event which was held in Singaraja. A single goal from I Made Andhika at that time successfully led Denpasar to win in the Buleleng Porprov, thwarting the struggle of the Badung Regency Porprov.

At the end of 2016, I Made Andhika was promoted to the Bali United first team.

I Made Andhika Wijaya body height is 173 cm (5 ft 8 in) and weight 64 kg (141 lb).

== Bali United Career ==
He made his debut in Liga 1 on 16 April 2017 against Madura United. On 25 October 2018, Andhika scored his first goal for Bali United against Borneo in the 74th minute at the Kapten I Wayan Dipta Stadium, Gianyar Regency, Bali. On 2 December 2019, Bali United won the championship for the first time in their history, becoming the seventh club to win the Liga 1 after second placed Borneo drew against PSM, followed by a win in Semen Padang, giving Bali United a 17-point lead with only four games left.

== Career statistics ==
=== Club ===
As of match played 5 September 2026

Club	Season	League		Cup (Note: Includes Piala Indonesia.)		Continental (Note: Appearances in AFC Cup, AFC Champions League)		Other		Total	
Club	Season	Apps	Goals	Apps	Goals	Apps	Goals	Apps	Goals	Apps	Goals
Bali United	2016	0	0	0	0	0	0	0	0	0	0
Bali United	2017	25	0	0	0	0	0	0	0	25	0
Bali United	2018	23	1	1	0	7	0	0	0	31	1
Bali United	2019	16	0	6	0	0	0	0	0	22	0
Bali United	2020	1	0	0	0	2	0	0	0	3	0
Bali United	2021–22	30	0	0	0	0	0	0	0	30	0
Bali United	2022–23	10	0	0	0	3	0	0	0	15	0
Bali United	2023–24	21	1	0	0	4	1	0	0	25	2
Bali United	2024–25	21	0	0	0	0	0	0	0	21	0
Bali United	2025–26	15	1	0	0	–		0	0	15	1
Bhayangkara Presisi (loan)	2026–27	1	0	0	0	–		0	0	1	0
Career total		163	3	7	0	16	1	0	0	188	4

== Honours ==
=== Club ===
Bali United

- Liga 1: 2019, 2021–22
- Indonesia President's Cup runner-up: 2018
