= Privat Mbarga =

Cambodian footballer

Personal information
- Full name: Jean Marie Privat Befolo Mbarga
- Date of birth: 7 January 1992 (age 34)
- Place of birth: Douala, Cameroon
- Height: 1.68 m (5 ft 6 in)
- Position: Winger

Team information
- Current team: ISI Dangkor Senchey
- Number: 37

Senior career*
Years	Team	Apps	(Gls)
2013	Boeung Ket Rubber Field	16	(2)
2014	Western Phnom Penh	20	(4)
2015	Angkor Tiger	22	(20)
2016–2017	Nagaworld	16	(4)
2017–2018	Samut Prakan	8	(2)
2018–2019	Asia Euro United	22	(28)
2019–2021	Svay Rieng	62	(74)
2021–2025	Bali United	117	(37)
2025–2026	Dewa United Banten	10	(0)
2026	→ Bhayangkara Presisi (loan)	16	(4)
2026–	ISI Dangkor Senchey	6	(2)
- * Club domestic league appearances and goals as of 10 November 2026

Jean Marie Privat Befolo Mbarga (born 7 January 1992) is a Cameroon professional footballer who plays as a winger.

== Club career ==
=== Bali United ===
On 24 December 2021, Privat moved to Indonesia to joined Bali United. Privat scored in his debut for Bali United in the 2021–22 Liga 1 tie against Barito Putera as his team won 3–0.

== International career ==
Privat had spent most of his career playing in Cambodia which made him eligible to obtain Cambodian citizenship. After acquiring Cambodian nationality, he was called up to the Cambodia senior squad ahead of two 2026 FIFA World Cup qualification first round matches against Pakistan on 12 and 17 October 2023. However, FIFA has yet to approve him to play for Cambodia, citing a lack of legal documentation.

== Honours ==
Svay Rieng

- C-League: 2019

Bali United

- Liga 1: 2021–22

Individual

- 2020 C-League Golden Boot
- 2019 C-League Golden Boot
- 2019 C-League Most Valuable Player
- APPI Indonesian Football Award Best 11: 2021–22
