= Bali United F.C. Youth Sector =

Indonesian football club

Bali United Youth Sector
- Full name: Bali United Football Club Youth Sector
- Nicknames: Serdadu Tridatu Muda (Young Tridatu Warriors)
- Ground: Gelora Samudra Stadium; Kapten I Wayan Dipta Stadium
- Chairman: Pieter Tanuri
Home colours	Away colours	Third colours

Bali United F.C. Youth Sector is youth set-up of Indonesian professional football club Bali United Football Club. The Youth Sector is made up of various squads divided by age groups. All the Youth Sector squads currently train at the Banteng Field, Seminyak and Tri Sakti Field, Legian. All the youth sector are playing in the Elite Pro Academy (under 20s, under 18s, and under 16s) and Soeratin Cup (under 17s and below).

Since the youth sector inception in 2016, some graduates have gone on to sign professional contracts with Bali United or other clubs.

== Organization ==
Bali United pays great attention to developing young players and run their own youth training academy in Bali, Kupang, and Lombok. For academy in Bali, they cooperated with Paris Saint-Germain and launched Paris Saint-Germain Academy Bali on 4 December 2016, which ended on 1 July 2019.

After establishing an academy in Bali, they worked with several entrepreneurs in Kupang to establish a football school called Bali United Kristal. The aim of the establishment of the football school is to accommodate the potential of football in Kupang and generally in East Nusa Tenggara.

Bali United Academy Lombok was officially established on 9 January 2019. The goal is that they want to help young players of West Nusa Tenggara to be able to realize their dreams of playing at the highest level of national football with good and quality coaching patterns. Bali United Academy Lombok uses the Filanesia and Bali United methods, and is trained by nationally licensed trainers.

Bali United's management also establish Bali United Elite Academy. Bali United Elite Academy itself is a process of developing young players prepared in the long term. The players who passed the selection received facilities such as housing and scholarships to attend school in one of the schools in Bali.

== Under-20s ==
=== Current squad ===
As of 28 November 2023

Note: Flags indicate national team as defined under FIFA eligibility rules; some limited exceptions apply. Players may hold more than one non-FIFA nationality.

No.	Pos.	Nation	Player
25	MF	IDN	Danu Agusta
31	GK	IDN	Kadek Riski
35	MF	IDN	Putu Mahesa
36	FW	IDN	Alexandre David
40	MF	IDN	Kadek Dwik
42	MF	IDN	Maouri Simon
43	GK	IDN	Putra Kaicen
46	MF	IDN	Josua Rengki
49	MF	IDN	Wayan Adinata
51	DF	IDN	Faisal Rabil
52	DF	IDN	Joriel Tuhuteru
57	MF	IDN	Kadek Ari Premana
60	DF	IDN	Junior Daud
62	MF	IDN	Ketut Jayanta

No.	Pos.	Nation	Player
63	DF	IDN	Gerry Wilson
70	MF	IDN	Sheva Dayansa
71	MF	IDN	Nur Huda
75	MF	IDN	Rifqi Rohiman
76	FW	IDN	Kadek Dimas
80	MF	IDN	Gouindayuma Higashijima
82	MF	IDN	Firman Syach
83	DF	IDN	Wadil Aryadi
84	MF	IDN	Demas Panyonga
92	MF	IDN	Reyner Barusu
93	DF	IDN	Kadek Lanang
96	FW	IDN	Putu Julyo
97	DF	IDN	Komang Aldi
100	GK	IDN	Komang Adi Wiraguna

=== Coaching staff ===
Position	Staff
Head coach	(Indonesia) I Made Pasek Wijaya
Assistant coach	(Indonesia) I Gede Putu Sudarna
Goalkeeping coach	(Indonesia) I Made Wardana

Last updated: 28 November 2023
Source: Liga Indonesia Baru

== Honours ==
- Indonesia Soccer Championship U-21
  - Runners-up (1): 2016
- Soeratin Cup U-17 Bali Region
  - Winners (1): 2018
  - Runners-up (1): 2016
- Soeratin Cup U-13 Bali Region
  - Winners (2): 2018, 2019
- Elite Pro Academy Liga 1 U-16
  - Runners-up (1): 2018
- Elite Pro Academy Liga 1 U-18
  - Winners (1): 2021

== Notable former youth team players ==
The following is a list of players who have played in Bali United's youth squad and contracted at a senior club football. Players who are currently playing at Bali United, or for another club on loan from Bali United, are highlighted in bold.

- (Indonesia) Amrun Mubarok
- (Indonesia) I Gede Rio Andreawan
- (Indonesia) I Putu Febri Andika
- (Indonesia) **I Made Andhika Wijaya**
- (Indonesia) Azka Fauzi
- (Indonesia) I Komang Sujana
- (Indonesia) Samsul Pellu
- (Indonesia) Syeh Fadiel Abdriansyah
- (Indonesia) Irvin Sidi
- (Indonesia) I Putu Pager Wirajaya
- (Indonesia) Arapenta Poerba
- (Indonesia) **I Kadek Agung Widnyana**
- (Indonesia) Dallen Doke
- (Indonesia) Chairil Zul Azhar
- (Indonesia) Reza Irfana
- (Indonesia) Kadek Haarlem Anggariva
- (Indonesia) Irfan Jauhari
- (Indonesia) **I Gede Agus Mahendra**
- (Indonesia) **Kadek Dimas Satria**
- (Indonesia) **Komang Tri**
