= Kadek Agung =

Indonesian footballer

I Kadek Agung Widnyana
Personal information
- Full name: I Kadek Agung Widnyana Putra
- Date of birth: 25 June 1998 (age 28)
- Place of birth: Tabanan, Indonesia
- Height: 1.70 m (5 ft 7 in)
- Position: Midfielder

Team information
- Current team: Bali United
- Number: 18

Youth career
- 2013–2014: SSB Putra Tresna
- 2015–2017: Bali United

Senior career*
Years	Team	Apps	(Gls)
2018–	Bali United	118	(6)

International career^{‡}
2019	Indonesia U23	1	(0)
2021–	Indonesia	11	(1)
Medal record
Men's football
Representing Indonesia
AFF U-22 Youth Championship
Winner	2019 Cambodia	Team
AFF Championship
Runner-up	2020 Singapore	Team
- * Club domestic league appearances and goals as of 22 May 2026 ‡ National team caps and goals as of 27 July 2026

I Kadek Agung Widnyana Putra (born 25 June 1998) is an Indonesian professional footballer who plays as a midfielder for Super League club Bali United and the Indonesia national team.

== Club career ==
=== Bali United ===
On 18 January 2018, Agung officially signed his first professional contract, a two-year deal with Liga 1 club Bali United after being promoted from Bali United U-19 and introduced as a trial player on 4 December 2017. He has renewed the contract, keeping him part of the team until the end of 2021 season.

Agung made his first-team and league debut for Bali United in a 1–0 win against Mitra Kukar on 15 October 2018 as a substitute for Irfan Bachdim in the 73rd minute. On 25 October, Agung scored his first league goal in the 2018 Liga 1 for Bali United in a 2–2 draw over Borneo at the Kapten I Wayan Dipta Stadium.

== International career ==
Kadek Agung played for the Indonesia under-22 national team in the 2019 AFF U-22 Youth Championship. He received a call to join the senior Indonesia national football team in May 2021. He earned his first cap in a friendly match against Oman on 29 May 2021. On 3 June 2021, he made first international goal against Thailand in a 2022 FIFA World Cup qualification, in which Indonesia drew 2–2.

== Career statistics ==
=== Club ===
As of 22 May 2026.

Club	Season	League			Cup		Continental		Other		Total	
Club	Season	Division	Apps	Goals	Apps	Goals	Apps	Goals	Apps	Goals	Apps	Goals
Bali United	2018	Liga 1	7	1	0	0	–		0	0	7	1
Bali United	2019	Liga 1	9	0	0	0	–		0	0	9	0
Bali United	2020	Liga 1	2	0	0	0	0	0	0	0	2	0
Bali United	2021–22	Liga 1	11	0	0	0	0	0	2 (Note: Appearances in Menpora Cup.)	0	13	0
Bali United	2022–23	Liga 1	0	0	0	0	0	0	0	0	0	0
Bali United	2023–24	Liga 1	28	1	0	0	5	0	0	0	33	1
Bali United	2024–25	Liga 1	30	0	0	0	0	0	2 (Note: Appearances in Piala Presiden.)	0	32	0
Bali United	2025–26	Super League	31	4	0	0	–		0	0	31	4
Career total			118	6	0	0	5	0	4	0	127	6

=== International ===
As of match played 27 July 2026

Appearances and goals by national team and year
National team	Year	Apps	Goals
Indonesia	2021	10	1
Indonesia	2026	1	0
Total		11	1

=== International goals ===
Goals for Indonesia

#	Date	Venue	Opponent	Score	Result	Competition
1.	3 June 2021	Al Maktoum Stadium, Dubai, United Arab Emirates	Thailand	1–1	2–2	2022 FIFA World Cup qualification

== Honours ==
=== Club ===
Bali United

- Liga 1: 2019, 2021–22

=== International ===
Indonesia U-22

- AFF U-22 Youth Championship: 2019

Indonesia

- AFF Championship runner-up: 2020
