= Bali United F.C. =

Association football team in Indonesia

Bali United
- Full name: Bali United Football Club
- Nickname: Serdadu Tridatu (Tridatu Warriors)
- Short name: BLI
- Founded: 15 February 2015; 11 years ago
- Ground: Kapten I Wayan Dipta Stadium
- Capacity: 18,000
Owner(s)
PT Bali Bintang Sejahtera Tbk	(66.7%)
Other shareholders (IDX: BOLA)	(33.3%)
- Chairman: Pieter Tanuri
- Head coach: Johnny Jansen
- League: Super League
- 2025–26: Super League, 8th of 18
- Website: www.baliutd.com
Home colours	Away colours	Third colours

Bali United Football Club is an Indonesian professional football club based in Gianyar, Bali. The club currently competes in the Super League, the top tier of Indonesian football. The club was founded in 2015 following the relocation and rebranding of Putra Samarinda, adopting its current name, badge, and colours. Bali United won its first top-tier Indonesian league title in 2019 and secured a second title in the 2021–22 season.

The club plays home matches at Kapten I Wayan Dipta Stadium and operates a professional training facility and youth academy. Bali United became the first professional football club in Indonesia and Southeast Asia to be publicly traded, offering shares through the Indonesia Stock Exchange in June 2019. The club has also competed in continental competitions such as the AFC Champions League and AFC Cup.

== History ==
=== Formation and early years (2015–2016) ===
Bali United was established on 14 February 2015 following the acquisition of Putra Samarinda by Indonesian businessman Pieter Tanuri. The club relocated from East Kalimantan, to Gianyar, Bali, and adopted the name Bali United. The club then first appointed Indra Sjafri as the club head coach, who formerly was the Indonesia national U19 team head coach. Under his leadership, Bali United focused on developing young players, bringing several U19 national team players into the top flight.

The club made its debut in the 2015 Indonesia Super League, playing its first match on 4 April 2015, a 2–1 away lost to Perseru Serui, with Lerby Eliandry scoring the team's first competitive goal. However, the season was discontinued after only two matches due to a conflict between the Indonesian government and PSSI, which ultimately led to a FIFA suspension of Indonesian football.

Bali United completed their first full season in the 2016 Indonesia Soccer Championship A, a temporary league organized to replace the suspended Indonesia Super League. The club finished 12th out of 18 teams, a respectable result for a newly relocated and rebranded club.

=== First title challenge and continental debut (2017–2018) ===
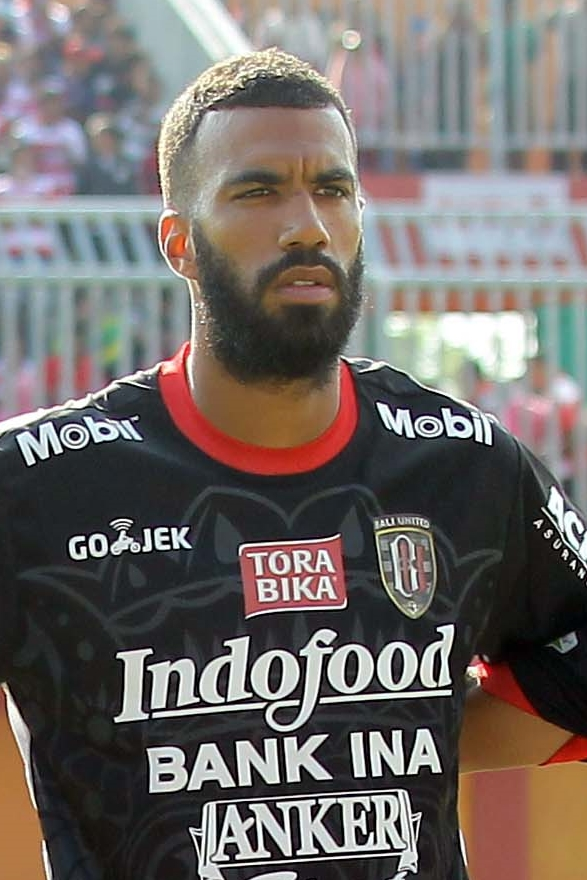
Sylvano Comvalius notably scored 37 goals which holds the all-time record for the most goals scored by a player in a single season.

In 2017, during the inaugural season of the revamp Liga 1, Bali United struggled in their first two matches under Austrian head coach Hans-Peter Schaller, who was subsequently sacked. Widodo Cahyono Putro, former Indonesian national team player, took over as the coach and led the team to compete for the title. Under Widodo, the team improved significantly and emerged as a contender for the league title. Bali United finished the season as runners-up, level on points with champions Bhayangkara on 68 points but lose out under the competition's head-to-head tiebreaking rules. The club scored 76 goals in 34 league matches, making it the league's most productive attacking team. Dutch forward Sylvano Comvalius scored 37 goals, setting a record for the most goals scored by a player in a single top flight league season. The campaign established Bali United as one of the leading clubs in Indonesian football and earned it qualification for continental competition.

Following their domestic success, Bali United qualified for the AFC competitions for the first time in 2018. They made their AFC Champions League debut on 16 January 2018 with a 3–1 win over Tampines Rovers in the preliminary stage round 1, but were eliminated in the second preliminary round by Chiangrai United. In the AFC Cup, the club finished fourth in the group stage. Domestically, Bali United struggled in Liga 1, finishing the season in 11th place.

The club also struggled domestically, finishing 11th in Liga 1 after its runner-up campaign the previous year. On 29 November 2018, Widodo Cahyono Putro resigned as head coach. The club cited personal reasons relating to his coaching career, including preparations for the AFC Pro coaching licence, while media reports also referred to contractual and internal issues. His departure ended the period in which Bali United had first established itself as a title contender.

=== Stefano Cugurra era (2019–2025) ===
==== First major silverware (2019) ====
Bali United appointed Brazilian head coach, Stefano Cugurra ahead of the 2019 season. Under Cugurra, the club maintained a consistent league campaign and secured its first Liga 1 league title on 2 December 2019, after a draw between Borneo and PSM Makassar confirmed their position as champions. Bali United finished the season with 64 points from 34 matches, recording 19 wins, seven draws and eight defeats. The club set a record for being the fastest to win the Liga 1 title since the competition adopted its current name, as well as achieving the largest points gap over the runner-up. The championship represented the club's first major league title since its establishment in Bali. In the same year, the club became publicly listed through its parent company, PT Bali Bintang Sejahtera Tbk, marking a significant development in its commercial structure.

Bali United began the 2020 season as defending champions and participated in the opening matches of Liga 1. However, the competition was suspended in March because of the COVID-19 pandemic in Indonesia and was subsequently cancelled without a champion. The interruption also affected the club's preparations for domestic and continental competitions.

==== Second league title ====
When Liga 1 resumed for the 2021–22 season, Bali United continued under Cugurra and successfully defended its championship. The team finished as champions with 75 points from 34 matches, recording 23 wins, six draws and five defeats. The title made Bali United the first club to win consecutive Liga 1 championships, following its 2019 triumph and the cancellation of the 2020 season. The achievement established the club as one of the most successful teams of the competition's modern era.

Following its consecutive championships, Bali United continued competing in Liga 1 and in Asian club competitions. The club finished fifth in the 2022–23 league season, ending its immediate run of title-winning campaigns. It scored 67 goals in 34 matches, although defensive inconsistency prevented it from mounting another sustained challenge for the championship.

The following 2023–24 season saw the introduction of a Championship Series format for the top four teams, in which Bali United finished fourth after losses to Persib in the semifinals and Borneo Samarinda in the third‑place playoff, despite finishing third in the regular series standings.

During the 2024–25 Liga 1 season, Bali United faced challenges, including multiple defeats and injuries, and spent much of the campaign outside the top positions. Amid this difficult period, Cugurra announced his intention to resign, stating he had reached a point where he felt he had contributed his maximum to the club after several years in charge. He continued to lead the team through the end of the season and received a formal farewell from the club following their final home match.

=== Post-Cugurra era (2025–present) ===
After the conclusion of the 2024–25 Liga 1 season, long‑time head coach Stefano Cugurra left Bali United following six seasons in charge, during which he led the club to two Liga 1 titles in 2019 and the 2021–22 season. His departure marked the end of one of the club’s most successful managerial periods.

On 26 May 2025, Bali United officially appointed Johnny Jansen, a Dutch coach previously involved in European football, as the club's new head coach ahead of the 2025–26 Super League season. The appointment represented a strategic shift toward a new footballing philosophy and broader team restructuring following the club's eighth‑place finish in the 2024–25 Liga 1 campaign.

== Team image ==
=== Crest and colours ===
Bali United traditionally play in red home kits, white away kits, and black third kits, inspired by the sacred Balinese Hinduism tri-colour, Tridatu, which gave rise to the club's nickname, Serdadu Tridatu (Tridatu Warriors).

The club's badge features the words Bali United above the abbreviation "BU", set against a black-and-white checkered background inspired by the poleng cloth, symbolizing Rwa Bhineda, or the balance of opposites. Bali United initially produced its own kits until 2021, when the club partnered with Mills, before switching to SPECS in 2022, which remains the kit supplier. The kits are frequently heavily sponsored, earning the nickname racing jerseys.

=== Supporters ===
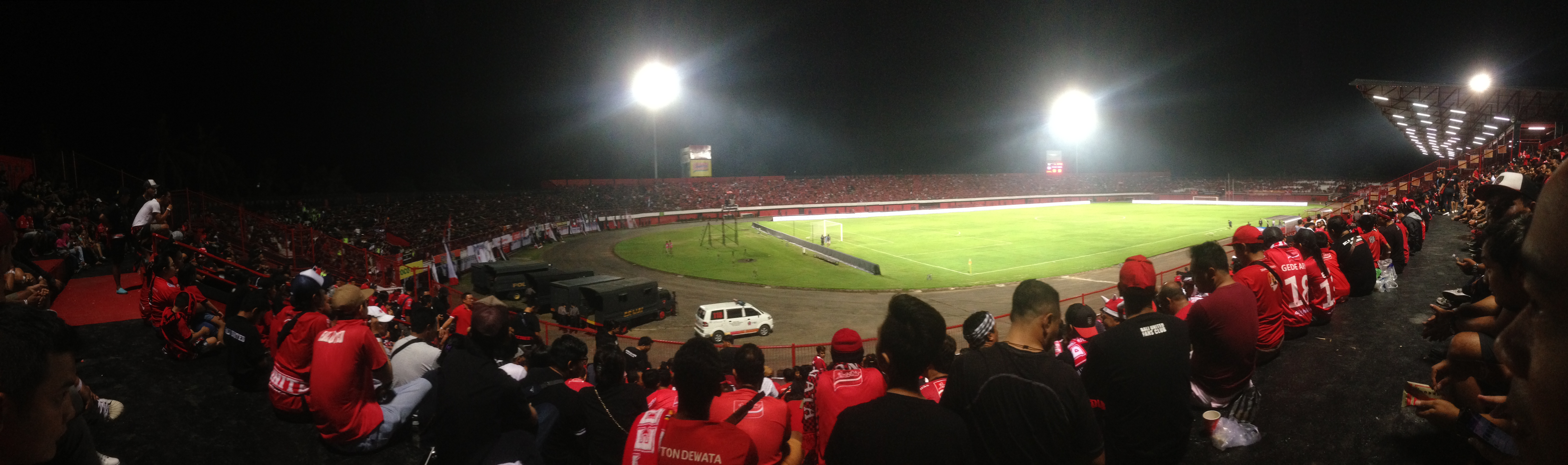
Bali United supporters watching a home game

Bali United's main supporters are called Semeton Dewata, with Semeton meaning brother and Dewata referring to Bali, the Island of Gods. Female supporters are known as Lady Dewata. This group of supporters usually occupy the east stand of Kapten I Wayan Dipta Stadium, while other supporter groups such as Northsideboys12 and Basudewa Curva Sud fill the north and south stands respectively.

The club has mascots representing the main supporter sections: Jalbo for Northsideboys12, Cebol for Semeton Dewata, and Wabol for Basudewa Curva Sud. Bali United fans sing the club anthem, Rasa Bangga (Pride), composed by the Bali band The Resistance, after all home and away games since 2017.

=== Media ===
Bali United operates its own digital and broadcast channels. Bali Utd TV, launched on YouTube on 19 October 2016, features news, interviews, match highlights, and themed programs. The club also has a mobile app, launched on 20 May 2017, to provide news and updates for supporters. Additionally, Bali United FM broadcasts games and news on 106.9 FM from the club's office.

=== Others ===
In 2019 season, Bali United established a women's football section with a team in the Liga 1 Putri. The women's team finished third in the group stage and failed to advance to the next round in their debut season. Since then, the status of the women's team has remained unclear due to the uncertainty surrounding the Liga 1 Putri competition.

Since February 2019, the club has had an eSports section named Island of Gods (IOG). In the Free Fire Asia Invitational (FFAI) 2019 tournament, they were champions after scoring the highest points, with 2,345 points.

In 2020, Bali United established a professional basketball team, Bali United Basketball, which competed in the Indonesian Basketball League (IBL) from 2020 until 2025. The team was dissolved after failing to secure sponsorship and comply with league requirements, and did not participate in the 2026 IBL season.

== Finances and ownership ==
After the 2014 Indonesia Super League season, Putra Samarinda owner Harbiansyah Hanafiah sold the club to businessman Pieter Tanuri. Tanuri subsequently relocated the club to Gianyar, Bali, citing the absence of a Balinese representative in Indonesia’s top-flight football following the dissolution of Bali Devata in 2013 after the Indonesian Premier League was discontinued.

Gianyar was chosen due to the availability of the Kapten I Wayan Dipta Stadium, previously used by Bali Devata, and its central location on the island, which was considered more accessible to local supporters than coastal tourist areas. Tanuri aimed to establish the club as a symbol of Balinese pride and to attract supporters from across the island. As part of this vision, the club underwent a complete rebranding and was renamed Bali United Pusam Football Club, adopting new colours and a crest reflecting Balinese identity.

== Stadium ==
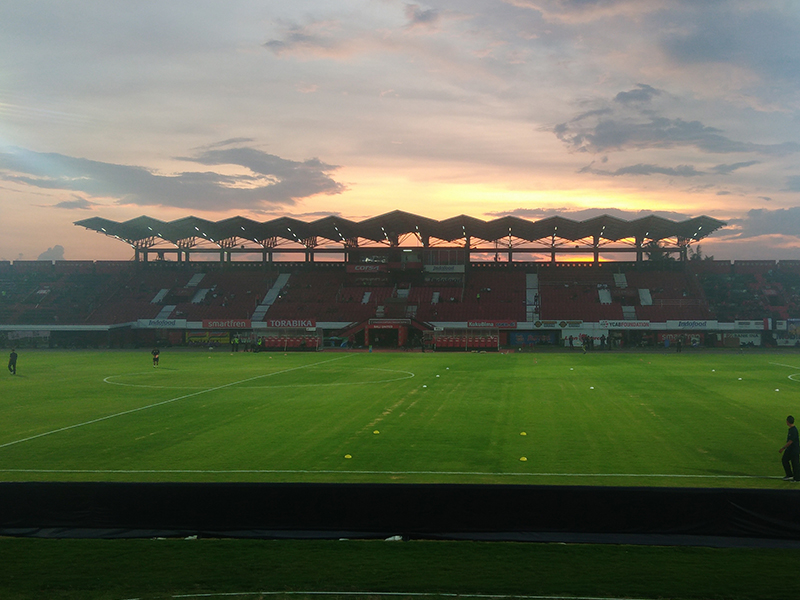
Kapten I Wayan Dipta Stadium

Bali United play their home matches at Kapten I Wayan Dipta Stadium in Gianyar, Bali. Opened in 2003, it is the largest football stadium on the island and has served as Bali United's home since the club's formation in 2015. Prior to their inaugural season, the club invested over IDR 5 billion to upgrade the stadium to meet Indonesia Super League standards, including improvements to lighting, dressing rooms, and other facilities.

The inaugural match for Bali United at Kapten I Wayan Dipta was a 0–1 friendly defeat against Persib on 3 March 2015. Since then, the stadium has hosted all of the club's home games, including domestic and AFC competition fixtures, and remains the central venue for the team and its supporters.

== Players ==
=== First-team squad ===
As of 22 September 2026

Note: Flags indicate national team as defined under FIFA eligibility rules; some limited exceptions apply. Players may hold more than one non-FIFA nationality.

No.	Pos.	Nation	Player
1	GK	NED	Mike Hauptmeijer
4	DF	IDN	Kadek Arel
5	DF	IDN	Bagas Adi Nugroho
6	MF	AUS	Brandon Wilson (vice-captain)
7	MF	NED	Thijmen Goppel
8	MF	JPN	Teppei Yachida
10	MF	NZL	Jay Herdman
11	FW	NED	Remco Balk
13	DF	FIN	Thomas Lam
14	MF	NED	Tim Receveur
16	DF	IDN	Rizky Dwi Febrianto
18	MF	IDN	Kadek Agung
19	FW	IDN	Jens Raven
20	FW	BOE	Jort van der Sande

No.	Pos.	Nation	Player
21	GK	IDN	Wayan Arta
22	DF	IDN	Tim Geypens
24	DF	IDN	Ricky Fajrin (captain)
27	MF	IDN	Reyner Barusu
41	MF	IDN	Irfan Jaya
42	MF	IDN	Maouri Simon
44	DF	IDN	Putu Panji
45	FW	CRO	Marko Dugandžić
47	MF	IDN	Rahmat Arjuna
55	MF	IDN	Made Tito
56	GK	IDN	Fitrul Dwi Rustapa
79	MF	IDN	Aris Sanjaya
83	DF	IDN	Agung Dwi
88	MF	BRA	Queven

=== Other players under contract ===
Note: Flags indicate national team as defined under FIFA eligibility rules; some limited exceptions apply. Players may hold more than one non-FIFA nationality.

No.	Pos.	Nation	Player
—	DF	BRA	João Ferrari

=== Out on loan ===
Note: Flags indicate national team as defined under FIFA eligibility rules; some limited exceptions apply. Players may hold more than one non-FIFA nationality.

No.	Pos.	Nation	Player
—	DF	IDN	Made Andhika (at Bhayangkara Presisi)
—	MF	IDN	Ananta Krisna (at Deltras)
—	FW	IDN	Nathan Ari (at Deltras)

== Management and staff ==
=== Management ===
Role	Name
Chairman	Pieter Tanuri
Chief executive officer	Yabes Tanuri
President director	Yabes Tanuri
Directors	Yohanes Ade Bunian Moniaga
Directors	Katharine Wianna
Directors	Putri Paramita Sudali
President commissioner	Jemi Wiyono Prihadi
Independent commissioner	Andy F. Noya
Commissioner	Edy Soehartono

=== Technical staff ===
Role	Name
Manager	(Indonesia) Michael Gerald
Assistant manager	(Indonesia) Richi Kurniawan
Secretary	(Indonesia) Kadek Ari Sukmantara
Media officer	(Indonesia) Alexander Maha Putra Oemanas
Head coach	(Netherlands) Johnny Jansen
Assistant coach	(Indonesia) I Gde Mahatma Dharma
Assistant coach	(Netherlands) Jeffrey Talan
Assistant coach	(Netherlands) Ronnie Pander
Analyst	(Indonesia) Fery Muchlas
Goalkeeper coach	(Brazil) Marcelo da Silva Pires
Assistant goalkeeper coach	(Indonesia) I Made Wardana
Physical coach	(Indonesia) Muhammad Rasyid
Team doctor	(Indonesia) Ganda Putra
Physiotherapy	(Indonesia) Agung Febriana
Physiotherapy	(Indonesia) Ari Putra
Masseur	(Indonesia) Kasmadi
Masseur	(Indonesia) Vega Rizky
Kitman	(Indonesia) Wayan Suarjana
Kitman	(Indonesia) Lukman Hakim
Interpreter	(Netherlands) Hendrickus Aben
Interpreter	(England) Lloyd Pringle

== Honours ==
Type	Honours	Titles	Seasons
League	Liga 1 / Super League	2	2019, 2021–22

== Award winners ==
=== Domestic ===
- League Golden Boot
  - (Netherlands) Sylvano Comvalius (2017)
  - (Indonesia) Ilija Spasojević (2021–22)
- Coach of the Season
  - (Brazil) Stefano Cugurra (2019)
- Team of the Season
  - (Netherlands) Sylvano Comvalius (2017)
  - (Indonesia) Ilija Spasojević (2019, 2021–22)
  - (Indonesia) Wawan Hendrawan (2019)
  - (Indonesia) Fadil Sausu (2019)
  - (Iraq) Brwa Nouri (2021–22)
  - (Indonesia) Ricky Fajrin (2023–24)
  - (Brazil) João Ferrari (2025–26)

== Records and statistics ==
As of 28 October 2026.

Top 10 all-time appearances
Rank	Player	Years	Club appearances
1	(Indonesia) Ricky Fajrin	2015–present	277
2	(Indonesia) Made Andhika	2016–present	196
3	(Indonesia) Ilija Spasojević	2018–2024	188
4	(Indonesia) Fadil Sausu	2014–2024	167
5	(Indonesia) Yabes Roni	2015–2026	166
6	(Indonesia) Rahmat	2020–2026	147
7	(Indonesia) Irfan Jaya	2022–present	135
7	(Indonesia) Kadek Agung	2018–present	135
9	(Cameroon) Privat Mbarga	2021–2025	133
10	(Iraq) Brwa Nouri	2018–2023	123

Top 10 all-time scorers
Rank	Player	Club appearances	Total goals
1	(Indonesia) Ilija Spasojević	188	88
2	(Cameroon) Privat Mbarga	133	41
3	(Netherlands) Sylvano Comvalius	34	37
4	(Netherlands) Melvin Platje	70	35
5	(Indonesia) Stefano Lilipaly	120	32
6	(Indonesia) Rahmat	147	27
7	(Indonesia) Irfan Jaya	135	26
8	(Brazil) Éber Bessa	105	16
8	(Indonesia) Fadil Sausu	167	16
10	(Indonesia) Irfan Bachdim	81	15

- Biggest wins: 6–0 vs Dewa United (10 September 2022)
- Heaviest defeats: 0–6 vs Borneo Samarinda (18 October 2019)
- Youngest ever debutant: Maouri Simon ~ 17 years 6 months 21 days old (On 30 April 2024 vs Persita Tangerang)
- Oldest ever player: Leonard Tupamahu ~ 39 years 9 months 3 days old (On 12 April 2023 vs PSIS Semarang)
- Youngest goal scorers: Hanis Sagara Putra ~ 18 years 4 months 8 days old (On 16 January 2018 vs (Singapore) Tampines Rovers)
- Oldest goal scorers: Leonard Tupamahu ~ 39 years 2 months 21 days old (On 30 September 2022 vs Persikabo 1973)

== Notable players ==
=== International capped players ===
As of 2026–27 season.

AFC/OFC.: (Australia) Brandon Wilson; (Iraq) Brwa Nouri; (Palestine) Mohammed Rashid; (Japan) Mitsuru Maruoka; (Japan) Teppei Yachida; (New Zealand) Jay Herdman; (Thailand) Elias Dolah	CAF.: (Mali) Mahamadou N'Diaye	UEFA.: (Croatia) Marko Dugandžić; (Finland) Thomas Lam; (Luxembourg) Mirza Mustafić; (Montenegro) Miloš Krkotić; (Netherlands) Jordy Bruijn; (Portugal) Paulo Sérgio	CONMEBOL/ CONCACAF.: (Bonaire) Jort van der Sande; (Costa Rica) Diego Campos

== Managerial history ==
Manager	Period	Achievements	Ref
(Indonesia) Indra Sjafri	2014–2017		
(Austria) Hans-Peter Schaller	2017		
(Indonesia) Eko Purdjianto (caretaker)	2017		
(Indonesia) Widodo Cahyono Putro	2017–2018		
(Indonesia) Eko Purdjianto (caretaker) (2)	2018		
(Brazil) Stefano Cugurra	2019–2025		
(Netherlands) Johnny Jansen	2025–present		

== Season by season record ==
=== Domestic records ===
Bali United domestic league and cup competitions by season
Season	League											Piala Indonesia	I-League Cup	Top goalscorer(s) (Note: Top goalscorer(s) includes all goals scored in league, cup, AFC competitions, and other competitive matches.)	
Season	Div	League	Pld	W	D	L	GF	GA	GD	Pts	Pos	Piala Indonesia	I-League Cup	Player(s)	Goals
2015	1	Super League	2	0	0	2	3	7	−4	0	— (Note: The season was discontinued due to a government ban on PSSI.)	—	n/a (Note: Indonesian League Cup will be first contested in 2026–27.)	(Indonesia) Lerby Eliandry	3
2016	No official competition were held. (Note: 2016 Indonesia Soccer Championship A was an unofficial competition replacing the suspended Super League.)														
2017	1	Liga 1	34	21	5	8	76	38	+38	68	2nd	—	n/a	(Netherlands) Sylvano Comvalius	37
2018	1	Liga 1	34	12	9	13	44	48	−4	45	11th	Quarter-finals	n/a	(Indonesia) Ilija Spasojević	14
2019	1	Liga 1	34	19	7	8	48	35	+13	64	1st	Quarter-finals	n/a	(Indonesia) Ilija Spasojević	19
2020	1	Liga 1	3	2	1	0	5	2	+3	7	— (Note: The season was discontinued due to the COVID-19 pandemic in Indonesia.)	—	n/a	(Netherlands) Melvin Platje	6
2021–22	1	Liga 1	34	23	6	5	57	26	+31	75	1st	—	n/a	(Indonesia) Ilija Spasojević	23
2022–23	1	Liga 1	34	16	6	12	67	53	+14	54	5th	—	n/a	(Indonesia) Ilija Spasojević (Cameroon) Privat Mbarga	17
2023–24	1	Liga 1	34	17	7	10	55	43	+12	58	4th (Note: Based on the Championship Series results, placed 3rd in the Regular Series.)	—	n/a	(Brazil) Jefferson Assis	15
2024–25	1	Liga 1	34	14	8	12	50	41	+9	50	8th	—	n/a	(Cameroon) Privat Mbarga	10
2025–26	1	Super League	34	14	9	11	57	48	+9	51	8th	—	n/a	(Montenegro) Boris Kopitović	8
1st or Winners 2nd or Runners-up 3rd place or semi-finalists Promoted Relegated

== Continental record ==
Season	Competition	Round	Club	Home	Away	Aggregate
2018	AFC Champions League	Preliminary round 2	(Thailand) Chiangrai United	2–1 (a.e.t.)		
2018	AFC Cup	Group G	(Myanmar) Yangon United	1–3	3–2	4th
2018	AFC Cup	Group G	(Philippines) Global Cebu	1–3	1–1	4th
2018	AFC Cup	Group G	(Vietnam) Thanh Hóa	3–1	0–0	4th
2020	AFC Champions League	Preliminary round 1	(Singapore) Tampines Rovers	3–5 (a.e.t.)		
2020	AFC Champions League	Preliminary round 2	(Australia) Melbourne Victory	5–0		
2020	AFC Cup	Group G	(Vietnam) Than Quảng Ninh	4–1	Cancelled	3rd
2020	AFC Cup	Group G	(Cambodia) Preah Khan Reach Svay Rieng	Cancelled	2–1	3rd
2020	AFC Cup	Group G	(Philippines) Ceres–Negros	Cancelled	4–0	3rd
2022	AFC Cup	Group G	(Malaysia) Kedah Darul Aman	2–0		3rd
2022	AFC Cup	Group G	(Cambodia) Visakha	5–2		3rd
2022	AFC Cup	Group G	(Philippines) Kaya–Iloilo	0–1		3rd
2023–24	AFC Champions League	Preliminary round	(Hong Kong) Lee Man	5–1		
2023–24	AFC Cup	Group G	(Philippines) Stallion Laguna	1–2	2–5	3rd
2023–24	AFC Cup	Group G	(Malaysia) Terengganu	1–1	2–0	3rd
2023–24	AFC Cup	Group G	(Australia) Central Coast Mariners	1–2	6–3	3rd

=== AFC club competition records ===
As of 2023–24 season

Bali United AFC club competitions by season
Competition	Record					
Competition	Pld	W	D	L	Win %	Best result
AFC Champions League	5	2	0	3	40.00	Preliminary round 2
AFC Cup	18	6	3	9	33.33	Group stage

== See also ==
- List of football clubs in Indonesia
