= 2024–25 Bali United F.C. season =

Indonesian football club season

Bali United
2024–25 season
- Chairman: Pieter Tanuri
- Head coach: Stefano Cugurra
- Stadium: Kapten I Wayan Dipta Stadium
- Liga 1: 8th
- Top goalscorer: Privat Mbarga (10)
- Highest home attendance: 10,085 v Persib (7 Jan 2025, Liga 1)
- Lowest home attendance: 2,130 v PSBS (11 March 2025, Liga 1)
- Average home league attendance: 4,926
- Biggest win: 5–1 v Semen Padang (Away, 20 Jan 2025, Liga 1); 4–0 v PSIS (Home, 1 May 2025, Liga 1)
- Biggest defeat: 0–3 v Persija (Away, 10 May 2025, Liga 1)
Home colours	Away colours	Third colours

The 2024–25 season was the 10th in the history of Bali United Football Club and the club's ninth consecutive season in the top flight of Indonesian football. The club participated only in the Liga 1 as they did not qualify for any AFC nor AFF club competitions, and the Piala Indonesia was not held again this season. The championship series was not implemented in the Liga 1 starting this season.

It was the first season since 2015 without their captain Fadil Sausu, who left the club after his contract expired. With the departures of Fadil, only two players remained from the first generation of Bali United, Ricky Fajrin and Yabes Roni. They also lost their all-time top goalscorer, Ilija Spasojević.

This was also Bali United's final season under Stefano Cugurra, who announced his departure at the season's end on 18 April 2025.

== Pre-season and friendlies ==
Bali United preceded their 2024–25 campaign with a pre-season tournament, 2024 Piala Presiden which they hosted the group stage. They were in Group B along with Arema, Madura United, and Persija. They began with a match against Arema on 21 July, in which they loss 0–1, followed by a match against Madura United three days later, losing 2–3 despite goals from Mitsuru Maruoka and Privat Mbarga. Their final game in the Piala Presiden saw them play against Persija on 26 July, winning 3–0 with goals from Brandon Wilson, Made Tito, and Rahmat.

Bali United's score is shown first in each case.

Bali United preseason results
Date	Venue	Opponents	Score	Bali United scorers	Att.	Ref.
21 July 2024	Kapten I Wayan Dipta, Gianyar (N)	Arema	0–1		3,942	
24 July 2024	Kapten I Wayan Dipta, Gianyar (N)	Madura United	2–3	Maruoka, Mbarga	3,292	
26 July 2024	Kapten I Wayan Dipta, Gianyar (N)	Persija	3–0	Wilson, Tito, Rahmat	4,447	

== Match results ==
=== Liga 1 ===
Bali United's score is shown first in each case.

Bali United in the 2024–25 Liga 1
Date	Venue	Opponents	Score	Bali United scorers	Att.	Ref.
11 August 2024	Brawijaya, Kediri (A)	Persik	3–1	Maruoka, Mbarga (2)	4,190	
18 August 2024	Kapten I Wayan Dipta, Gianyar (H)	Semen Padang	2–0	Nambu, Mbarga	5,311	
27 August 2024	Batakan, Balikpapan (A)	Borneo Samarinda	0–2		1,917	
11 September 2024	Kapten I Wayan Dipta, Gianyar (H)	Arema	0–0		4,059	
16 September 2024	Kapten I Wayan Dipta, Gianyar (H)	PSS	0–0		4,557	
21 September 2024	Sultan Agung, Bantul (A)	Malut United	4–1	Cássio (o.g.), Tito, Rahmat, Irfan	0	
27 September 2024	Kapten I Wayan Dipta, Gianyar (H)	Barito Putera	3–2	Everton (2), Mbarga	3,615	
20 October 2024	Kapten I Wayan Dipta, Gianyar (A)	Persita	1–0	Mbarga	0	
27 October 2024	Kapten I Wayan Dipta, Gianyar (H)	Persis	3–0	Maruoka, Irfan, Everton	5,198	
3 November 2024	Kapten I Wayan Dipta, Gianyar (A)	PSBS	0–2		485	
23 November 2024	Pakansari, Cibinong (A)	Dewa United	0–1		463	
7 December 2024	Kapten I Wayan Dipta, Gianyar (H)	PSM	1–1	Rahmat	5,826	
11 December 2024	Moch. Soebroto, Magelang (A)	PSIS	1–2	Everton	1,531	
15 December 2024	Kapten I Wayan Dipta, Gianyar (H)	Persija	3–1	Arjuna, Everton, Rahmat	4,922	
20 December 2024	Gelora Bangkalan, Bangkalan (A)	Madura United	1–2	Mbarga	224	
28 December 2024	Kapten I Wayan Dipta, Gianyar (H)	Persebaya	2–0	Mbarga, Irfan	8,390	
7 January 2025 (Note: Originally scheduled for 1 December 2024.)	Kapten I Wayan Dipta, Gianyar (H)	Persib	1–1	Arjuna	10,085	
12 January 2025	Kapten I Wayan Dipta, Gianyar (H)	Persik	1–3	Irfan	4,097	
20 January 2025	Haji Agus Salim, Padang (A)	Semen Padang	5–1	Mbarga (2), Kopitović, Rahmat (2)	6,850	
28 January 2025	Kapten I Wayan Dipta, Gianyar (H)	Borneo Samarinda	3–2	Arjuna, Kopitović, Rahmat	6,218	
3 February 2025	Gelora Soeprijadi, Blitar (A)	Arema	0–1		121	
10 February 2025	Maguwoharjo, Sleman (A)	PSS	2–1	Arjuna, Irfan	5,342	
17 February 2025	Kapten I Wayan Dipta, Gianyar (H)	Malut United	1–1	Kopitović	3,835	
24 February 2025	Demang Lehman, Banjarbaru (A)	Barito Putera	1–3	Kopitović	6,692	
2 March 2025	Kapten I Wayan Dipta, Gianyar (H)	Persita	1–1	Sandro (o.g.)	3,159	
6 March 2025	Manahan, Surakarta (A)	Persis	2–2	Arjuna, Kopitović	9,231	
11 March 2025	Kapten I Wayan Dipta, Gianyar (H)	PSBS	0–2		2,130	
10 April 2025	Kapten I Wayan Dipta, Gianyar (H)	Dewa United	0–0		2,922	
18 April 2025	Gelora Bandung Lautan Api, Bandung (A)	Persib	1–2	Irfan	24,466	
25 April 2025	Gelora B.J. Habibie, Parepare (A)	PSM	1–0	Mbarga	6,182	
1 May 2025	Kapten I Wayan Dipta, Gianyar (H)	PSIS	4–0	João Ferrari (o.g.), Syuhada (o.g.), Irfan, Novri	3,864	
10 May 2025	Jakarta International, North Jakarta (A)	Persija	0–3		7,889	
17 May 2025	Kapten I Wayan Dipta, Gianyar (H)	Madura United	0–2		5,492	
23 May 2025	Gelora Bung Tomo, Surabaya (A)	Persebaya	3–1	Irfan, Arjuna, Kopitović	25,523	

Pos	Team	Pld	W	D	L	GF	GA	GD	Pts
6	PSM	34	13	14	7	47	34	+13	53
7	Persija	34	14	9	11	47	38	+9	51
8	Bali United	34	14	8	12	50	41	+9	50
9	PSBS	34	13	9	12	44	47	−3	48
10	Arema	34	13	8	13	53	51	+2	47

Source: Liga 1 2024–25
Rules for classification: 1) Points; 2) Head-to-head points; 3) Head-to-head goal difference; 4) Head-to-head goals scored; 5) Goal difference; 6) Goals scored; 7) Fair-play points; 8) Drawing of lots.

== Club officials ==
Position	Staff
Head coach	(Brazil) Stefano Cugurra
Assistant coach	(Brazil) Kleber Santos (Indonesia) I Gde Mahatma
Goalkeeping coach	(Brazil) Marcelo Pires
Physical coach	(Indonesia) Muhammad Rasyid
Manager	(Indonesia) Michael Gerald
Team doctor	(Indonesia) Ganda Putra
Physiotheraphy	(Indonesia) Agung Febriana (Indonesia) Made Ari Putra
Masseur	(Indonesia) Ferdian Deny (Indonesia) Kasmadi
Kitman	(Indonesia) I Wayan Suarjana (Indonesia) Luqman Hakim
Media officer	(Indonesia) Alexander Oemanas
Analyst	(Indonesia) Fery Muchlas

Last updated: 21 September 2024
Source: LIB Official Website

== Player stats ==
=== Appearances and goals ===
No.	Pos	Nat	Player	Total		Liga 1	
No.	Pos	Nat	Player	Apps	Goals	Apps	Goals
1	GK	(Brazil) BRA	Adilson Maringá	29	0	29	0
2	DF	(Indonesia) IDN	Agung Mannan	7	0	1+6	0
4	DF	(Thailand) THA	Elias Dolah	29	0	28+1	0
5	DF	(Indonesia) IDN	Bagas Adi Nugroho	7	0	4+3	0
6	MF	(Australia) AUS	Brandon Wilson	31	0	27+4	0
7	MF	(Indonesia) IDN	Sidik Saimima	17	0	8+9	0
8	MF	(Japan) JPN	Mitsuru Maruoka	25	2	17+8	2
9	FW	(Montenegro) MNE	Boris Kopitović	15	6	15	6
10	MF	(Cameroon) CMR	Privat Mbarga	32	10	30+2	10
11	MF	(Indonesia) IDN	Yabes Roni	20	0	12+8	0
15	MF	(Indonesia) IDN	Nathan Ari^{YOUTH}	2	0	1+1	0
17	FW	(Indonesia) IDN	Taufik Hidayat	1	0	0+1	0
18	MF	(Indonesia) IDN	Kadek Agung	30	0	25+5	0
20	DF	(Brazil) BRA	Jaime Xavier	12	0	8+4	0
22	MF	(Indonesia) IDN	Novri Setiawan	25	1	17+8	1
23	MF	(Indonesia) IDN	Dillan Rinaldi	1	0	0+1	0
24	DF	(Indonesia) IDN	Ricky Fajrin	28	0	26+2	0
26	DF	(Indonesia) IDN	Komang Tri	7	0	2+5	0
28	MF	(Indonesia) IDN	Gede Sunu	0	0	0	0
33	DF	(Indonesia) IDN	Made Andhika	22	0	15+7	0
41	MF	(Indonesia) IDN	Irfan Jaya	33	8	28+5	8
42	MF	(Indonesia) IDN	Maouri Simon	1	0	0+1	0
44	DF	(Indonesia) IDN	Kadek Arel	17	0	16+1	0
47	MF	(Indonesia) IDN	Rahmat Arjuna	31	6	25+6	6
55	MF	(Indonesia) IDN	Made Tito	11	1	11	1
67	DF	(Indonesia) IDN	Komang Aryantara	0	0	0	0
71	MF	(Indonesia) IDN	Luthfi Kamal	18	0	1+17	0
72	MF	(Indonesia) IDN	Nyoman Adi	0	0	0	0
76	DF	(Indonesia) IDN	Kadek Lanang^{YOUTH}	4	0	2+2	0
78	MF	(Indonesia) IDN	Komang Ananta^{YOUTH}	1	0	0+1	0
87	MF	(Indonesia) IDN	Komang Dedi	1	0	0+1	0
91	MF	(Indonesia) IDN	Rahmat	24	6	1+23	6
95	GK	(Indonesia) IDN	Fitrul Dwi Rustapa	5	0	5	0
99	FW	(Brazil) BRA	Everton	25	5	18+7	5
Players transferred out during the season
39	MF	(Japan) JPN	Kenzo Nambu	13	1	3+10	1
93	DF	(Indonesia) IDN	Gede Agus	0	0	0	0

- Source: Match results
- Ordered by player's number.

=== Disciplinary record ===
No.	Pos	Nat	Player	Total			Liga 1		
No.	Pos	Nat	Player	Yellow card	Second yellow card	Red card	Yellow card	Second yellow card	Red card
1	GK	(Brazil) BRA	Adilson Maringá	3	0	0	3	0	0
2	DF	(Indonesia) IDN	Agung Mannan	2	1	0	2	1	0
4	DF	(Thailand) THA	Elias Dolah	8	0	0	8	0	0
6	MF	(Australia) AUS	Brandon Wilson	9	0	0	9	0	0
7	MF	(Indonesia) IDN	Sidik Saimima	4	0	0	4	0	0
9	FW	(Montenegro) MNE	Boris Kopitović	6	0	0	6	0	0
10	MF	(Cameroon) CMR	Privat Mbarga	6	0	0	6	0	0
11	MF	(Indonesia) IDN	Yabes Roni	8	1	0	8	1	0
15	MF	(Indonesia) IDN	Nathan Ari^{YOUTH}	1	0	0	1	0	0
18	MF	(Indonesia) IDN	Kadek Agung	4	0	0	4	0	0
20	DF	(Brazil) BRA	Jaime Xavier	4	0	0	4	0	0
22	DF	(Indonesia) IDN	Novri Setiawan	7	0	0	7	0	0
24	DF	(Indonesia) IDN	Ricky Fajrin	5	0	0	5	0	0
33	DF	(Indonesia) IDN	Made Andhika	4	0	0	4	0	0
41	MF	(Indonesia) IDN	Irfan Jaya	3	0	0	3	0	0
44	DF	(Indonesia) IDN	Kadek Arel	2	0	0	2	0	0
47	MF	(Indonesia) IDN	Rahmat Arjuna	5	0	0	5	0	0
55	MF	(Indonesia) IDN	Made Tito	2	0	0	2	0	0
71	MF	(Indonesia) IDN	Luthfi Kamal	2	0	0	2	0	0
99	FW	(Brazil) BRA	Everton	2	0	0	2	0	0
Players transferred out during the season
39	MF	(Japan) JPN	Kenzo Nambu	2	0	0	2	0	0

- Source: Match results
- Ordered by player's number.
- (yellow card) = Number of bookings; (second yellow card) = Number of sending offs after a second yellow card; (red card) = Number of sending offs by a direct red card.

== Transfers ==
=== Transfers in ===
Date from	Pos.	Name	From	Fee	Ref.
19 June 2024	MF	(Japan) Mitsuru Maruoka	RANS Nusantara	Free transfer	
29 June 2024	GK	(Indonesia) Fitrul Dwi Rustapa	Persib	Free transfer	
30 June 2024	DF	(Indonesia) Bagas Adi Nugroho	Arema	Free transfer	
1 July 2024	MF	(Australia) Brandon Wilson	Free agent	Free transfer	
2 July 2024	MF	(Japan) Kenzo Nambu	PSM	Free transfer	
12 July 2024	FW	(Brazil) Everton	(Lebanon) Nejmeh	Free transfer	
12 August 2024	MF	(Indonesia) Dillan Rinaldi	(Germany) Bergisch Gladbach 09	Free transfer	
2 January 2025	FW	(Montenegro) Boris Kopitović	(Singapore) Tampines Rovers	Undisclosed	

=== Transfers out ===
Date from	Pos.	Name	To	Fee	Ref.
2 June 2024	GK	(Indonesia) Muhammad Ridho	Barito Putera (Note: Joined on 7 June 2024.)	Free transfer	
3 June 2024	MF	(Indonesia) Fadil Sausu	Gresik United (Note: Joined on 30 July 2024.)	Free transfer	
3 June 2024	DF	(Indonesia) Jajang Mulyana	Persiku (Note: Joined on 10 August 2024.)	Free transfer	
4 June 2024	FW	(Brazil) Jefferson Assis	(Thailand) Lamphun Warriors (Note: Joined on 6 July 2024.)	Free transfer	
4 June 2024	DF	(Indonesia) Haudi Abdillah	Madura United (Note: Joined on 4 July 2024.)	Free transfer	
5 June 2024	MF	(Indonesia) Ramdani Lestaluhu	Persiku	Free transfer	
5 June 2024	MF	(Palestine) Mohammed Rashid	Persebaya (Note: Joined on 28 June 2024.)	Free transfer	
5 June 2024	MF	(Brazil) Éber Bessa	(Portugal) Alverca (Note: Joined on 2 September 2024.)	Free transfer	
1 July 2024	FW	(Indonesia) Kadek Dimas Satria	Free agent	End of contract	
12 July 2024	FW	(Indonesia) Ilija Spasojević	Bhayangkara Presisi (Note: Joined on 13 July 2024.)	Free transfer	
16 January 2025	MF	(Japan) Kenzo Nambu	Borneo Samarinda	Free transfer	

=== Loans in ===
Start date	Pos.	Name	From	End date	Ref.
16 January 2025	DF	(Indonesia) Agung Mannan	Dewa United	End of season	
16 January 2025	DF	(Brazil) Jaime Xavier	PSBS	End of season	

=== Loans out ===
Start date	Pos.	Name	To	End date	Ref.
29 June 2024	DF	(Indonesia) Ardi Idrus	Persebaya	End of season	
29 June 2024	DF	(Indonesia) Ryuji Utomo	Persita	End of season	
9 July 2024	MF	(Indonesia) Tegar Infantrie	Barito Putera	End of season	
28 July 2024	GK	(Indonesia) Rakasurya Handika	Nusantara United	End of season	
16 January 2025	DF	(Indonesia) Gede Agus	Nusantara United	End of season	
