= 2021–22 Persija Jakarta season =

Persija Jakarta
2021–22 season
- Owner: PT Persija Jaya Jakarta
- President: Mohamad Prapanca
- Head Coach: (Indonesia) Sudirman (until 12 June 2021), (2nd Spell from 20 January 2022) (Italy) Angelo Alessio (until 19 January 2022)
- Stadium: Gelora Bung Karno Main Stadium
Home colours	Away colours	Third colours

The 2021–22 season is Persija Jakarta's 88th competitive season. This season is Persija's 27th consecutive season in the top flight since professional competition was formed in 1994. The season covers the period from 27 August 2021 to 30 April 2022.

== Coaching staff ==
Position	Staff
First-team Coach	(Indonesia) Sudirman
Assistant Coach	(Indonesia) Ilham Ralibi (Indonesia) Ferdiansyah
Goalkeeper Coach	(Indonesia) Ahmad Fauzi
Team Doctor	(Indonesia) dr. Donny Kurniawan, SpKO
Physiotherapist	(Indonesia) M. Yanizar Lubis (Indonesia) Okky Setiawan
Masseur	(Indonesia) Aditya Julistiawan (Indonesia) Akhmad Aditya Subkhi
Kitman	(Indonesia) Abdul Rahman Saleh (Indonesia) Andika (Indonesia) Candra Darmawan

=== Management ===
Chief Executive Officer	(Indonesia) Mohammad Prapanca
Financial Director	(Indonesia) Koko Afiat
Sporting Director	(Indonesia) Ferry Paulus
Marketing Director	(Indonesia) Andhika Suksmana
Manager	(Indonesia) Bambang Pamungkas
Assistant Manager	(Indonesia) Abel Anmas
Match Organizing Committee	(Indonesia) Haen Rahmawan
Club Secretary	(Indonesia) M. Araaf Sidik
Media Officer	(Indonesia) Dwi Putra
Ground (capacity and dimensions)	Gelora Bung Karno (76,127 / 105x68 metres)
Training Ground	NYTC Sawangan

== New contracts ==
No.	Pos	Player/Staff	Contract length	Contract end	Date	Source
46	MF	(Indonesia) Osvaldo Ardiles Haay	TBA	31 December 2021	9 March 2021	

== Transfers ==
=== In ===
No.	Pos	Player	Transferred From	Fee	Date	Source
4	CB	(Brazil) Yann Motta Pinto	(Singapore) Tanjong Pagar United FC	Free	10 March 2021	
23	GK	(Indonesia) Yoewanto Setya Beny	(Indonesia) PS Barito Putera	Free	16 March 2021	
48	MF	(Indonesia) Ichsan Kurniawan	(Indonesia) PSG Pati	Free	15 December 2021	
31	MF	(Indonesia) Samuel Christianson Simanjuntak	(Indonesia) Madura United F.C.	Free	17 December 2021	

=== Out ===
No.	Pos	Player	Transferred To	Fee	Date	Source
6	CM	(Indonesia) Evan Dimas Darmono	(Indonesia) Bhayangkara Solo F.C.	Free	8 March 2021	
88	GK	(Indonesia) Shahar Ginanjar	(Indonesia) Dewa United F.C.	Free	14 March 2021	
39	CM	(Indonesia) Sandi Darma Sute	(Indonesia) Persis Solo	Free	1 June 2021	
94	LW	(Indonesia) Heri Susanto	(Indonesia) Persis Solo	Free	1 June 2021	
71	CF	(Indonesia) Sutan Zico	(Indonesia) AHHA PS Pati F.C.	Free	14 June 2021	
10	CM	(Indonesia) Marc Anthony Klok	(Indonesia) Persib Bandung	Free	23 June 2021	
66	LB	(Indonesia) Alfath Fathier	(Indonesia) Persis Solo	Free	3 July 2021	

=== Loan In ===
No.	Pos	Player	Loaned From	Start	End	Source

=== Loan Out ===
No.	Pos	Player	Loaned to	Start	End	Source
41	LW	(Indonesia) Feby Eka Putra	(Indonesia) Arema F.C.	26 February 2020	31 December 2021	
42	MF	(Indonesia) Fadil Redian	(Indonesia) Perserang Serang	26 February 2020	31 December 2021	
90	LB	(Indonesia) Rinto Ali	(Indonesia) Cilegon United F.C.	26 February 2020	31 December 2021	
4	CB	(Indonesia) Ryuji Utomo Prabowo	(Malaysia) Penang F.C.	1 December 2020	31 December 2021	
81	DM	(Indonesia) Adrianus Dwiki Arya Poernomo	(Indonesia) Persela Lamongan	4 March 2021	31 December 2021	
40	LB	(Indonesia) Al Hamra Hehanusa	(Indonesia) Dewa United F.C.	14 March 2021	31 December 2021	
99	CF	(Indonesia) Muhammad Rafli Mursalim	(Indonesia) Dewa United F.C.	14 March 2021	31 December 2021	
24	CM	(Indonesia) Resky Fandi Witriawan	(Indonesia) Dewa United F.C.	16 March 2021	31 December 2021	

== Squad information ==
=== First team squad ===
No.	Name	Nat.	Date of Birth (Age)	Signed in	Contract until	Signed from	Transfer Fee	Notes
Goalkeepers
22	Risky Muhammad Sudirman	(Indonesia)	2 February 2002 (age 23)	2019				Under-23 Player; Originally from Youth system
23	Yoewanto Setya Beny	(Indonesia)	3 April 1993 (age 32)	2021		(Indonesia) PS Barito Putera		
26	Andritany Ardhiyasa	(Indonesia)	26 December 1991 (age 33)	2010	2021	(Indonesia) Sriwijaya		Captain
29	Adixi Lenzivio	(Indonesia)	29 September 1993 (age 32)	2019	2021		Free	Originally from Youth system
99	Cahya Supriadi	(Indonesia)	11 February 2003 (age 22)	2021		(Indonesia) Persija Jakarta U-21	Free	Under-23 Player; Originally from Youth system
Defenders
2	Ilham Rio Fahmi	(Indonesia)		2021		(Indonesia) Persija Jakarta U-21	Free	Under-23 player Originally from Youth system
4	Yann Motta Pinto	(Brazil)	24 November 1999 (age 26)	2021		(Singapore) Tanjong Pagar United FC	Free	Foreign Player
5	Otávio Dutra	(Indonesia)	22 November 1983 (age 42)	2020	2021	(Indonesia) Persebaya Surabaya	Free	Naturalized Player
6	Tony Sucipto	(Indonesia)	12 February 1986 (age 39)	2019	2021	(Indonesia) Persib Bandung		
12	Salman Alfarid	(Indonesia)	16 April 2002 (age 23)	2020	2023	(Indonesia) Persija Jakarta U-21	Free	Under-23 player Originally from Youth system
14	Ismed Sofyan	(Indonesia)	28 August 1979 (age 46)	2003	2021	(Indonesia) Persijatim Jakarta Timur		Vice Captain
28	Muhammad Rezaldi Hehanusa	(Indonesia)	7 November 1995 (age 30)	2016	2021	(Indonesia) Persitangsel Tangerang Selatan		
41	Muhammad Ferarri	(Indonesia)	21 June 2003 (age 22)	2021		(Indonesia) Persija Jakarta U-21	Free	Under-23 player Originally from Youth system
47	Marco Motta	(Italy)	14 May 1986 (age 39)	2020	2021	(Cyprus) AC Omonia	Free	Foreign Player
56	Maman Abdurrahman	(Indonesia)	12 May 1982 (age 43)	2015	2021	(Indonesia) Persita Tangerang		
69	Rangga Widiansyah	(Indonesia)	24 April 2002 (age 23)	2021		(Indonesia) Persija Jakarta U-21	Free	Under-23 player Originally from Youth system
78	Hadi Ardiansyah	(Indonesia)	1 December 2000 (age 25)	2021		(Indonesia) Persija Jakarta U-21	Free	Under-23 player Originally from Youth system
94	Imam Pathuroman	(Indonesia)	31 May 1994 (age 31)	2021		Free Agent	Free	
Midfielders
7	Rizki Ramdani Lestaluhu	(Indonesia)	5 November 1991 (age 34)	2014	2019	(Indonesia) Sriwijaya		Originally from Youth system 2nd Vice Captain
11	Novri Setiawan	(Indonesia)	11 November 1993 (age 32)	2014		(Indonesia) Persebaya Surabaya		
25	Riko Simanjuntak	(Indonesia)	26 January 1992 (age 33)	2018	2019	(Indonesia) Semen Padang	Free	
32	Rohit Chand Thakuri	(Nepal)	1 March 1992 (age 27)	2017		(Nepal) Manang Marshyangdi Club	Free	Foreign Player
45	Raka Cahyana Rizky	(Indonesia)	24 February 2004 (age 21)	2021		(Indonesia) Persija Jakarta U-21	Free	Under-23 player Originally from Youth system
60	Radzky Syahwal Ginting	(Indonesia)	1 December 2003 (age 22)	2021				Under-23 Player; Originally from Youth system
77	Dony Tri Pamungkas	(Indonesia)	11 January 2005 (age 20)	2021				Under-23 Player; Originally from Youth system
80	Braif Fatari	(Indonesia)	9 April 2002 (age 23)	2019				Under-23 Player; Originally from Youth system
81	Adrianus Dwiki Arya Poernomo	(Indonesia)	1 May 2000 (age 25)	2019	2021	(Indonesia) Persija Jakarta U-21	Free	Under-23 player Originally from Youth system
82	Resa Aditya Nugraha	(Indonesia)	6 March 2004 (age 21)	2021		(Indonesia) Persija Jakarta U-21	Free	Under-23 player Originally from Youth system
Forwards
9	Marko Šimić	(Croatia)	23 January 1989 (age 36)	2017	2022	(Malaysia) Melaka United		Foreign Player
18	Alfriyanto Nico	(Indonesia)	3 April 2003 (age 22)	2020				Under-23 Player; Originally from Youth system
46	Osvaldo Ardiles Haay	(Indonesia)	17 May 1997 (age 28)	2020	2021	(Indonesia) Persebaya Surabaya	Free	
61	Muhammad Fajar Firdaus	(Indonesia)	21 October 2002 (age 23)	2021		(Indonesia) Persija Jakarta U-21	Free	Under-23 player Originally from Youth system
63	Muhammad Uchida Sudirman	(Indonesia)	25 March 2003 (age 22)	2021		(Indonesia) Persija Jakarta U-21	Free	Under-23 player Originally from Youth system
98	Taufik Hidayat	(Indonesia)	16 December 1999 (age 25)	2019		(Indonesia) Sriwijaya F.C.	Free	Under-23 Player; Originally from Youth system

== Pre-season ==
Win Draw Loss

=== Friendly Matches ===
13 March 2021 Friendly	Persita Tangerang	0–0	Persija Jakarta	Kelapa Dua, Tangerang Regency, Banten
15.30 (UTC+7)		Report		Stadium: Indomilk Arena; Attendance: 0

July 2021 Friendly	Persija Jakarta	2–1	Persikabo 1973	Depok, West Java
15.30 (UTC+7)	Šimić; Raka		Goal	Stadium: POR Sawangan; Attendance: 0

19 August 2021 Friendly	Persija Jakarta	1–0	Dewa United F.C.	Depok, West Java
15.30 (UTC+7)	Šimić 70'	Report		Stadium: POR Sawangan; Attendance: 0

23 August 2021 Friendly	Persija Jakarta	0–1	AHHA PS Pati F.C.	Depok, West Java
15.30 (UTC+7)		Report	Syahrul 38'	Stadium: POR Sawangan; Attendance: 0

28 August 2021 Friendly	Persija Jakarta	2–0	Persikabo 1973	Depok, West Java
15.30 (UTC+7)	Osvaldo 65'; Radzky 77'	Report		Stadium: POR Sawangan; Attendance: 0

=== 2021 Menpora Cup ===
==== Group stage ====
===== Group B =====
Pos	Team	Pld	W	D	L	GF	GA	GD	Pts	Qualification
1	Persija (A)	3	2	0	1	6	3	+3	6	Knockout stage
2	PSM (A)	3	1	2	0	5	3	+2	5	Knockout stage
3	Bhayangkara Solo (E)	3	1	1	1	3	3	0	4	
4	Borneo (E)	3	0	1	2	2	7	−5	1	

Source: Piala Menpora
(A) Advance to a further round; (E) Eliminated

Matches Win Draw Loss

22 March 2021 Group Stage	Persija Jakarta	0–2	PSM Makassar	Kepanjen, Malang Regency, East Java
18:15 (UTC+7)		Report	Patrich 45'; Yakob 67'	Stadium: Kanjuruhan Stadium; Attendance: 0 Referee: Rully Ruslin Tambuntina (Malang)

27 March 2021 Group Stage	Borneo F.C.	0–4	Persija Jakarta	Kepanjen, Malang Regency, East Java
18:15 (UTC+7)		Report	M. Motta 45'; Osvaldo 50'; Y. Motta 66'; Šimić 88'	Stadium: Kanjuruhan Stadium; Attendance: 0 Referee: Hamim Tohari (Lamongan)

31 March 2021 Group Stage	Persija Jakarta	2–1	Bhayangkara Solo F.C.	Kepanjen, Malang Regency, East Java
18:15 (UTC+7)	Osvaldo 53'; Klok 79'	Report	N'Douassel 27'	Stadium: Kanjuruhan Stadium; Attendance: 0 Referee: Yeni Krisdianto (Tulungagung)

==== Knockout Phase ====
===== Quarter-finals =====
10 April 2021 Quarter Finals	Persija Jakarta	1-0	PS Barito Putera	Kepanjen, Malang Regency, East Java
18:15 (UTC+7)	Šimić 61'	Report		Stadium: Kanjuruhan Stadium; Attendance: 0 Referee: Steven Yubel Poli (Manado)

===== Semi-finals =====
15 April 2021 Semi-finals 1st Leg	PSM Makassar	0-0	Persija Jakarta	Sleman, Special Region of Yogyakarta
20:30 (UTC+7)		Report		Stadium: Maguwoharjo Stadium; Attendance: 0 Referee: Hamim Tohari (Lamongan)

18 April 2021 Semi-finals 2nd Leg	Persija Jakarta	0-0 (0-0 agg.) (4-3 p)	PSM Makassar	Surakarta, Central Java
20:30 (UTC+7)		Report		Stadium: Manahan Stadium; Attendance: 0 Referee: Aprisman Aranda (Padangpanjang)
	Penalties
	Šimić (penalty missed); Rohit (penalty scored); Y. Motta (penalty scored); Novri (penalty missed); Klok (penalty scored); Sandi (penalty missed); Riko (penalty missed); Tony (penalty scored)		(penalty scored) Hasyim; (penalty scored) Rasyid; (penalty missed) Abd. Rahman; (penalty scored) Sutanto; (penalty missed) Yakob; (penalty missed) Zulham; (penalty missed) Saldy; (penalty missed) Zulkifli

===== Finals =====
22 April 2021 Final 1st Leg	Persija Jakarta	2-0	Persib Bandung	Sleman, Special Region of Yogyakarta
20:30 (UTC+7)	Braif 1'; Taufik 7'	Report		Stadium: Maguwoharjo Stadium; Attendance: 0 Referee: Fariq Hitaba (Yogyakarta)

25 April 2021 Final 2nd Leg	Persib Bandung	1-2 (1-4 agg.)	Persija Jakarta	Surakarta, Central Java
20:30 (UTC+7)	Ferdinand 84'	Report	Osvaldo 51'; Riko 90+1'	Stadium: Manahan Stadium; Attendance: 0 Referee: Agus Fauzan Arifin (Sleman)

== Competitions ==
=== Overview ===
Competition	Record								Started round	Final position / round	First match	Last match
Competition	G	W	D	L	GF	GA	GD	Win %	Started round	Final position / round	First match	Last match
Liga 1	34	11	12	11	43	40	+3	32.35	Matchday 1	Matchday 34	6 September 2021	31 March 2022
Total	34	11	12	11	43	40	+3	32.35				

Updated to match played 31 March 2022
Source: Competitions

=== Liga 1 ===

Persija XI BRI Liga 1 2021–22

==== League table ====
Pos	Team	Pld	W	D	L	GF	GA	GD	Pts
6	Borneo	34	14	10	10	43	35	+8	52
7	PSIS	34	11	13	10	35	34	+1	46
8	Persija	34	11	12	11	43	40	+3	45
9	Madura United	34	10	11	13	45	43	+2	41
10	Persikabo 1973	34	10	10	14	49	48	+1	40

Source: BRI Liga 1 2021–22
Rules for classification: 1) Points; 2) Head-to-head; 3) Goal difference; 4) Goals scored; 5) Drawing.

==== Results summary ====
Overall								Home						Away					
Pld	W	D	L	GF	GA	GD	Pts	W	D	L	GF	GA	GD	W	D	L	GF	GA	GD
34	11	12	11	43	40	+3	45	4	4	9	15	22	−7	7	8	2	28	18	+10

Last updated: 31 March 2022.
Source: Competitive matches

==== Results by matchday ====
Matchday	1	2	3	4	5	6	7	8	9	10	11	12	13	14	15	16	17	18	19	20	21	22	23	24	25	26	27	28	29	30	31	32	33	34
Ground	A	H	A	H	H	A	H	A	H	A	H	A	H	A	H	A	H	A	H	A	H	H	A	H	A	H	A	H	A	H	A	H	A	H
Result	D	D	D	W	D	W	L	W	L	D	D	W	L	L	W	W	D	W	L	D	W	L	D	L	D	W	D	L	L	L	W	W	D	L
Position	9	11	10	6	6	4	8	5	9	8	9	8	9	10	9	8	8	6	8	8	6	6	6	7	7	7	7	7	7	8	8	7	7	8

Updated to match(es) played on 30 January 2022. Source: Matches
A = Away; H = Home; W = Win; D = Draw; L = Loss; P = Postponed

==== Matches ====
Win Draw Loss

First Round
Series 1

5 September 2021 1	PSS Sleman	1-1	Persija Jakarta	Cibinong, West Java
20:30 UTC+7	Irkham 67'	Report	Y. Motta 17'	Stadium: Pakansari Stadium; Attendance: 0 Referee: Steven Yubel Poli (Manado)

12 September 2021 2	Persija Jakarta	2-2	PSIS Semarang	Kelapa Dua, Tangerang Regency, Banten
20:30 UTC+7	Dutra 45+2'; Šimić 50'	Report	Hari Nur 72'; Rohit 88' (og.)	Stadium: Indomilk Sport Center Stadium; Attendance: 0 Referee: Iwan Sukoco (Malang)

19 September 2021 3	Persipura Jayapura	0-0	Persija Jakarta	Kelapa Dua, Tangerang Regency, Banten
20:30 UTC+7		Report		Stadium: Indomilk Sport Center Stadium; Attendance: 0 Referee: Hamim Tohari (Lamongan)

24 September 2021 4	Persija Jakarta	2-1	Persela Lamongan	Cibinong, West Java
20:45 UTC+7	Šimić 21' (pen.); Nico 46'	Report	Ivan Carlos 63'	Stadium: Pakansari Stadium; Attendance: 0 Referee: Faulur Rosy (Banda Aceh)

28 September 2021 5	Persija Jakarta	1-1	Persita Tangerang	Cibinong, West Java
20:45 UTC+7	Rohit 29'	Report	Irsyad 42'	Stadium: Pakansari Stadium; Attendance: 0 Referee: Asep Yandis (Karawang)

2 October 2021 6	Persiraja Banda Aceh	0-1	Persija Jakarta	Cibinong, West Java
20:30 UTC+7		Report	Šimić 70' (pen.)	Stadium: Pakansari Stadium; Attendance: 0 Referee: Adi Riyanto (Kendal)

Series 2

17 October 2021 7	Persija Jakarta	0-1	Arema F.C.	Surakarta, Central Java
18:15 UTC+7		Report	Fortes 30'	Stadium: Manahan Stadium; Attendance: 0 Referee: Oki Dwi Putra Senjaya (Bandung)

22 October 2021 8	Madura United F.C.	2-3	Persija Jakarta	Magelang, Central Java
20:45 UTC+7	Jajá 90+1' (pen.); Rafael 90+5'	Report	Šimić 20', 54'; Nico 52'	Stadium: Moch. Soebroto Stadium; Attendance: 0 Referee: Fariq Hitaba (Yogyakarta)

26 October 2021 9	Persija Jakarta	0-1	Persebaya Surabaya	Surakarta, Central Java
20:45 UTC+7		Report	Marukawa 25'	Stadium: Manahan Stadium; Attendance: 0 Referee: Faulur Rosy (Banda Aceh)

30 October 2021 10	Persik Kediri	2-2	Persija Jakarta	Surakarta, Central Java
20:45 UTC+7	Machado 16'; Antoni 43'	Report	Nico 36'; Šimić 48'	Stadium: Manahan Stadium; Attendance: 0 Referee: Steven Yubel Poli (Manado)

5 November 2021 11	Persija Jakarta	1-1	PS Barito Putera	Magelang, Central Java
20:45 UTC+7	Šimić 26'	Report	Rakić 15'	Stadium: Moch. Soebroto Stadium; Attendance: 0 Referee: Dwi Purba Adi Wicaksana (Kudus)

Series 3

20 November 2021 12	Persib Bandung	0-1	Persija Jakarta	Surakarta, Central Java
21:00 UTC+7		Report	Šimić 45+1'	Stadium: Manahan Stadium; Attendance: 0 Referee: Aprisman Aranda (Padangpanjang)

25 November 2021 13	Persija Jakarta	0-1	Bali United F.C.	Surakarta, Central Java
19:00 UTC+7		Report	Spasojević 25'	Stadium: Manahan Stadium; Attendance: 0 Referee: Thoriq Munir Alkatiri (Bandung)

29 November 2021 14	Borneo F.C.	2-1	Persija Jakarta	Magelang, Central Java
20:45 UTC+7	Torres 48' (pen.); Wawan 90+2'	Report	Šimić 20'	Stadium: Moch. Soebroto Stadium; Attendance: 0 Referee: Abdullah (Sabang)

3 December 2021 15	Persija Jakarta	1-0	Persikabo 1973	Bantul, Special Region of Yogyakarta
20:45 UTC+7	Rohit 49'	Report		Stadium: Sultan Agung Stadium; Attendance: 0 Referee: Agung Setiawan (Tegal)

7 December 2021 16	PSM Makassar	0-3	Persija Jakarta	Surakarta, Central Java
20:30 UTC+7		Report	Šimić 56'; Osvaldo 64'; Braif 90+2'	Stadium: Manahan Stadium; Attendance: 0 Referee: Syaiful Arif (Gresik)

11 December 2021 17	Persija Jakarta	0-0	Bhayangkara F.C.	Sleman, Special Region of Yogyakarta
18:15 UTC+7		Report		Stadium: Maguwoharjo Stadium; Attendance: 0 Referee: Tabrani (Surabaya)

Second Round
Series 4

6 January 2022 18	PSIS Semarang	1-2	Persija Jakarta	Gianyar, Bali
21:30 UTC+8	Eka Febri 19'	Report	Šimić 14', 68'	Stadium: Kapten I Wayan Dipta Stadium; Attendance: 0 Referee: Tabrani (Surabaya)

11 January 2022 19	Persija Jakarta	1-2	Persipura Jayapura	Gianyar, Bali
17:30 UTC+8	Makan 90+4'	Report	Pahabol 25'; Yevhen 45'	Stadium: Kapten I Wayan Dipta Stadium; Attendance: 0 Referee: Fariq Hitaba (Yogyakarta)

15 January 2022 20	Persela Lamongan	1-1	Persija Jakarta	Gianyar, Bali
20:00 UTC+8	Malik 57'	Report	Motta 81'	Stadium: Kapten I Wayan Dipta Stadium; Attendance: 0 Referee: Adi Riyanto (Kendal)

26 January 2022 21	Persita Tangerang	1-2	Persija Jakarta	Denpasar, Bali
21:30 UTC+8	Taylon 40'	Report	Rio Fahmi 32'; Taufik 68'	Stadium: I Gusti Ngurah Rai Stadium; Attendance: 0 Referee: M. Erfan Efendi (Surabaya)

30 January 2022 22	Persija Jakarta	0-1	Persiraja Banda Aceh	Gianyar, Bali
21:30 UTC+8		Report	Asrizal 67'	Stadium: Kapten I Wayan Dipta Stadium; Attendance: 0 Referee: Hamim Tohari (Lamongan)

Series 5

5 February 2022 23	Arema F.C.	1-1	Persija Jakarta	Gianyar, Bali
21:45 UTC+8	Fortes 57'	Report	Šimić 40'	Stadium: Kapten I Wayan Dipta Stadium; Attendance: 0 Referee: Asep Yandis (Karawang)

14 February 2022 25	Persebaya Surabaya	3-3	Persija Jakarta	Gianyar, Bali
21:45 UTC+8	Marukawa 15' (pen.); Kambuaya 48'; S. Arif 83'	Report	Šimić 2'; Makan 86'; Makan 90+5' (pen.)	Stadium: Kapten I Wayan Dipta Stadium; Attendance: 0 Referee: Thoriq Munir Alkatiri (Bandung)

19 February 2022 26	Persija Jakarta	2-1	Persik Kediri	Gianyar, Bali
21:45 UTC+8	Makan 14'; Jauhari 90+3'	Report	Ezzejjari 7'	Stadium: Kapten I Wayan Dipta Stadium; Attendance: 0 Referee: Darma Santoso Gulo (Nias)

23 February 2022 27	PS Barito Putera	1-1	Persija Jakarta	Denpasar, Bali
21:30 UTC+8	Bruno Matos 66' (pen.)	Report	Jauhari 61'	Stadium: Kompyang Sujana Stadium; Attendance: 0 Referee: Steven Yubel Poli (Manado)

1 March 2022 28	Persija Jakarta	0-2	Persib Bandung	Gianyar, Bali
21:30 UTC+8		Report	D. da Silva 15'; D. da Silva 84'	Stadium: Kapten I Wayan Dipta Stadium; Attendance: 0 Referee: Fariq Hitaba (Yogyakarta)

Series 6

6 March 2022 29	Bali United	2-1	Persija Jakarta	Denpasar, Bali
21:45 UTC+8	Spasojević 34'; Lerby 83'	Report	Jauhari 77'	Stadium: I Gusti Ngurah Rai Stadium; Attendance: 0 Referee: Dwi Purba Adi Wicaksana (Kudus)

10 March 2022 30	Persija Jakarta	1-2	Borneo F.C.	Gianyar, Bali
21:30 UTC+8	Abimanyu 20'	Report	Hamisi 12'; Bustos 55'	Stadium: Kapten I Wayan Dipta Stadium; Attendance: 0 Referee: Thoriq Munir Alkatiri (Bandung)

13 March 2022 31	Persikabo 1973	0-4	Persija Jakarta	Denpasar, Bali
21:45 UTC+8		Report	Jauhari 22'; Makan 62' (pen.); Makan 67'; Braif 90+1'	Stadium: Kompyang Sujana Stadium; Attendance: 0 Referee: Wawan Rapiko (Pekanbaru)

17 March 2022 24	Persija Jakarta	1-3	Madura United F.C.	Gianyar, Bali
21:30 UTC+8	Taufik 64'	Report	Renan Silva 18'; Rohit 33' (o.g.); Bayu Gatra 68'	Stadium: Kapten I Wayan Dipta Stadium; Attendance: 0 Referee: Sance Lawita (Manado)
Note: The match was originally scheduled for 9 February 2022, but was postponed at the request of both clubs due to Omicron surge in Indonesia

21 March 2022 32	Persija Jakarta	3-1	PSM Makassar	Denpasar, Bali
17:00 UTC+8	Makan 34'; Jauhari 45'; Ikhwan 59'	Report	Sayuri 16'	Stadium: I Gusti Ngurah Rai Stadium; Attendance: 0 Referee: Agung Setiawan (Tegal)

26 March 2022 33	Bhayangkara F.C.	1-1	Persija Jakarta	Gianyar, Bali
18:30 UTC+8	Dzumafo 25'	Report	Taufik 20'	Stadium: Kapten I Wayan Dipta Stadium; Attendance: 0 Referee: Ruli Ruslin Tambutina (Malang)

31 March 2022 34	Persija Jakarta	0-2	PSS Sleman	Denpasar, Bali
16:30 UTC+8		Report	Mustaine 4' (pen.); Kurniawan 82'	Stadium: I Gusti Ngurah Rai Stadium; Attendance: 0 Referee: Iwan Sukoco (Malang)
