= 2021–22 Bali United F.C. season =

Indonesian football club season

Bali United
2021–22 season
- Chairman: Pieter Tanuri
- Head coach: Stefano Cugurra
- Stadium: Kapten I Wayan Dipta Stadium
- Liga 1: 1st
- Piala Indonesia: Not held
- AFC Cup: Cancelled
- Top goalscorer: Ilija Spasojević (23)
Home colours	Away colours	Third colours

The 2021–22 season was the seventh season of competitive association football and the sixth season in the Liga 1 played by Bali United Football Club, a professional football club based in Gianyar, Bali, Indonesia. Due to the cancellation of 2020 season, mean it is their sixth successive season in Liga 1.

Coming into the season, Bali United are the reigning Liga 1 champions and they succeeded in defending their titles and become the first ever back to back champions. They also qualified for the 2021 AFC Cup group stage. This season is Bali United's third with head coach Stefano Cugurra.

== Background ==
The 2020 season was Stefano Cugurra's second full season as head coach of Bali United, having taken charge in January 2019. The club had their second Asian competitions appearances as they competed in AFC Champions League, where they knocked out again in the preliminary round 2, this time by Australian side Melbourne Victory. That result made them got a consolation place in the AFC Cup, where they unable to finish as the competition was cancelled due to COVID-19 pandemic in Asia. They also unable to finish the league season as the competition was cancelled and declared void due to the COVID-19 pandemic in Indonesia.

== Pre-season and friendlies ==
=== Friendlies ===
Friendlies match details
Date	Opponent	Venue	Result	Scorers
7 March 2021 – 19:30	Indonesia U23s	Neutral	1–3	Lerby
29 April 2021 – 20:30	Bali United U20s	Neutral	3–1	Haudi, Gavin, Widnyana
30 May 2021 – 16:00	RANS Cilegon	Neutral	1–0	Lerby
13 June 2021 – 16:30	PSIM	Away	2–1	Pellu (2)
14 June 2021 – 16:30	PSIM	Away	1–1	Gavin
16 June 2021 – 16:30	Persis	Away	2–1 (Note: The match was called off at the 80th minute due to the technical fault of stadium lights.)	Fahmi, Spasojević
18 June 2021 – 16:30	Barito Putera	Neutral	0–2	

=== Menpora Cup ===
Menpora Cup match details
Date	Round	Opponent	Venue	Result	Scorers	Referee
24 March 2021 – 19:15	Group stage	Persib	Neutral	1–1	Pacheco	Yeni Krisdianto
29 March 2021 – 16:15	Group stage	Persiraja	Neutral	2–0	Spasojević, Pellu	Annas Apriliandi
2 April 2021 – 16:15	Group stage	Persita	Neutral	1–1	Spasojević	Dwi Purba
12 April 2021 – 21:30	Quarter-finals	PSS	Neutral	0–0 (2–4 p)		Nusur Fadilah

== Match results ==
=== Liga 1 ===
Pos	Team	Pld	W	D	L	GF	GA	GD	Pts	Qualification or relegation
1	Bali United (C)	34	23	6	5	57	26	+31	75	Qualification for the 2022 AFC Cup group stage (Note: Bali United qualified for the 2022 AFC Cup group stage as the 2019 Liga 1 champions.) and Qualification for the 2023-24 AFC Champions League Preliminary Round 1
2	Persib	34	20	9	5	48	22	+26	69	
3	Bhayangkara	34	19	9	6	48	27	+21	66	
4	Arema	34	18	11	5	44	25	+19	65	
5	Persebaya	34	18	9	7	56	35	+21	63	

Source: BRI Liga 1 2021–22
Rules for classification: 1) Points; 2) Head-to-head; 3) Goal difference; 4) Goals scored; 5) Drawing.
(C) Champions

Liga 1 match details
Date	Week	Opponent	Venue	Result	Scorers	Referee	Position
Series 1 – Jakarta, West Java & Banten
27 August 2021 – 20:00	1	Persik	Jakarta (H)	1–0	Rahmat	Yudi Nurcahya	4
11 September 2021 – 16:15	2	Barito Putera	Tangerang (A)	2–1	Pellu, Spasojević	Annas Apriliandi	1
18 September 2021 – 21:30	3	Persib	Tangerang (H)	2–2	Spasojević, Yabes	Sance Lawita	2
24 September 2021 – 16:15	4	Persita	Cibinong (A)	2–1	Spasojević (2)	Agung Setiawan	1
28 September 2021 – 19:15	5	Borneo	Tangerang (A)	1–1	Spasojević	Aprisman Aranda	2
2 October 2021 – 16:15	6	Persikabo 1973	Jakarta (H)	1–1	Lerby	Dwi Susilo	3
Series 2 – Central Java & Special Region of Yogyakarta
17 October 2021 – 16:15	7	PSM	Bantul (A)	1–2	Spasojević	Faulur Rossy	6
23 October 2021 – 21:45	8	Bhayangkara	Sleman (H)	1–2	Spasojević	Hamim Thohari	7
27 October 2021 – 21:45	9	PSS	Surakarta (A)	2–0	Platje, Éber	Rully Ruslin Tambuntina	5
31 October 2021 – 21:45	10	PSIS	Sleman (H)	0–0		Annas Apriliandi	7
5 November 2021 – 19:15	11	Persipura	Bantul (A)	1–0	Fajrin	Sigit Budiyanto	5
Series 3 – Central Java & Special Region of Yogyakarta
19 November 2021 – 21:45	12	Persela	Magelang (H)	2–1	Spasojević (2)	Faulur Rossy	4
25 November 2021 – 19:30	13	Persija	Surakarta (A)	1–0	Spasojević	Thoriq Alkatiri	4
30 November 2021 – 21:45	14	Persiraja	Sleman (H)	5–0	Platje, Spasojević (2), Haudi, Fajrin	Yudi Nurcahya	4
5 December 2021 – 21:45	15	Arema	Sleman (A)	0–0		Ginanjar Rahman Latief	4
9 December 2021 – 21:45	16	Madura United	Bantul (H)	0–1		Moch Adung	5
5 January 2022 – 21:45	17	Persebaya	North Denpasar (A)	1–3	Éber	Asep Yandis	5
Series 4 – Bali
9 January 2022 – 18:00	18	Barito Putera	North Denpasar (H)	3–0	Spasojević (2), Mbarga	Yudi Nurcahya	5
13 January 2022 – 21:45	19	Persib	North Denpasar (A)	1–0	Lilipaly	Steven Yubel Poli	5
17 January 2022 – 19:15	20	Persita	North Denpasar (H)	2–0	Mbarga, Rahmat	Asep Yandis	5
29 January 2022 – 16:15	21	Borneo	North Denpasar (H)	2–1	Mbarga, Lerby	Thoriq Alkatiri	5
3 February 2022 – 21:30	22	Persikabo 1973	North Denpasar (A)	3–0	Tupamahu, Spasojević, Lilipaly	Pipin Indra Pratama	3
7 February 2022 – 21:30	23	PSM	North Denpasar (H)	2–2	Lilipaly, Spasojević	Sigit Budiyanto	3
12 February 2022 – 19:00	24	Bhayangkara	North Denpasar (A)	3–0	Spasojević, Lilipaly, Irfan	Faulur Rossy	3
16 February 2022 – 21:45	25	PSS	North Denpasar (H)	1–0	Spasojević	Hamim Thohari	2
20 February 2022 – 21:45	26	PSIS	North Denpasar (A)	1–0	Mbarga	Sance Lawita	2
24 February 2022 – 21:45	27	Persipura	North Denpasar (H)	4–1	Spasojević, Pacheco, Lilipaly, Éber	Fariq Hitaba	1
1 March 2022 – 17:00	28	Persela	West Denpasar (A)	2–1	Rahmat, Éber	Thoriq Alkatiri	1
Series 5 – Bali
6 March 2022 – 21:45	29	Persija	North Denpasar (H)	2–1	Spasojević, Lerby	Dwi Purba	1
11 March 2022 – 21:30	30	Persiraja	West Denpasar (A)	1–0	Spasojević	Yudi Nurcahya	1
15 March 2022 – 18:00	31	Arema	North Denpasar (H)	2–1	Dendi (o.g.), Nouri	Faulur Rossy	1
21 March 2022 – 21:30	32	Madura United	West Denpasar (A)	2–0	Spasojević, Éber	Oki Dwi Putra	1
25 March 2022 – 21:45	33	Persebaya	North Denpasar (H)	0–3		Thoriq Alkatiri	1
31 March 2022 – 21:00	34	Persik	Gianyar (A)	3–1	Spasojević, Rahmat, Lilipaly	Fariq Hitaba	1

=== AFC Cup ===
Pos	Team	Pld	W	D	L	GF	GA	GD	Pts
1	(Vietnam) Hanoi	0	0	0	0	0	0	0	0
2	(Indonesia) Bali United	0	0	0	0	0	0	0	0
3	(Cambodia) Boeung Ket	0	0	0	0	0	0	0	0
4	Winners of ASEAN 2.1	0	0	0	0	0	0	0	0

Source: AFC
Rules for classification: Tiebreakers

AFC Cup match details
Date	Round	Opponent	Venue	Result	Scorers	Attendance	Referee
TBD – --:--	Group stage	(Cambodia) Boeung Ket					
TBD – --:--	Group stage	(Laos) Chanthabouly or (Brunei) Kasuka					
TBD – --:--	Group stage	(Vietnam) Hanoi					

== Player details ==
=== Appearances and goals ===
No.	Pos	Nat	Player	Total		Liga 1		AFC Cup	
No.	Pos	Nat	Player	Apps	Goals	Apps	Goals	Apps	Goals
1	GK	(Indonesia) IDN	Nadeo Argawinata	17	0	17	0	0	0
4	MF	(Indonesia) IDN	Ahmad Agung	7	0	0+7	0	0	0
5	DF	(Indonesia) IDN	Haudi Abdillah	14	1	11+3	1	0	0
6	MF	(Iraq) IRQ	Brwa Nouri	30	1	29+1	1	0	0
9	FW	(Indonesia) IDN	Ilija Spasojević	34	23	34	23	0	0
10	MF	(Indonesia) IDN	Stefano Lilipaly	30	6	26+4	6	0	0
11	MF	(Indonesia) IDN	Yabes Roni	11	1	6+5	1	0	0
13	DF	(Indonesia) IDN	Gunawan Dwi Cahyo	0	0	0	0	0	0
14	MF	(Indonesia) IDN	Fadil Sausu (captain)	14	0	9+5	0	0	0
15	DF	(Indonesia) IDN	Gavin Kwan Adsit	10	0	1+9	0	0	0
16	MF	(Indonesia) IDN	Hariono	16	0	5+11	0	0	0
17	MF	(Indonesia) IDN	Sidik Saimima	16	0	9+7	0	0	0
18	MF	(Indonesia) IDN	I Kadek Agung Widnyana	11	0	6+5	0	0	0
19	MF	(Indonesia) IDN	Rizky Pellu	27	1	16+11	1	0	0
20	FW	(Indonesia) IDN	Lerby Eliandry	23	3	1+22	3	0	0
21	GK	(Indonesia) IDN	Rakasurya Handika	1	0	1	0	0	0
22	DF	(Indonesia) IDN	Dias Angga Putra	12	0	3+9	0	0	0
24	DF	(Indonesia) IDN	Ricky Fajrin	30	2	29+1	2	0	0
26	DF	(Indonesia) IDN	Komang Tri	3	0	2+1	0	0	0
27	MF	(Brazil) BRA	Éber Bessa	28	5	23+5	5	0	0
29	GK	(Indonesia) IDN	Samuel Reimas	0	0	0	0	0	0
30	DF	(Indonesia) IDN	Eky Taufik	7	0	3+4	0	0	0
32	DF	(Indonesia) IDN	Leonard Tupamahu	29	1	25+4	1	0	0
33	DF	(Indonesia) IDN	I Made Andhika Wijaya	30	0	27+3	0	0	0
37	MF	(Cameroon) CMR	Privat Mbarga	17	4	16+1	4	0	0
41	MF	(Indonesia) IDN	Irfan Jaya	13	1	2+11	1	0	0
43	DF	(Brazil) BRA	Willian Pacheco	30	1	30	1	0	0
59	GK	(Indonesia) IDN	Wawan Hendrawan	16	0	16	0	0	0
66	DF	(Indonesia) IDN	I Gede Agus Mahendra	1	0	1	0	0	0
76	FW	(Indonesia) IDN	Kadek Dimas Satria	0	0	0	0	0	0
77	DF	(Indonesia) IDN	Reuben Silitonga	0	0	0	0	0	0
85	DF	(Indonesia) IDN	Michael Orah	5	0	3+2	0	0	0
91	MF	(Indonesia) IDN	Rahmat	22	4	4+18	4	0	0
96	DF	(Indonesia) IDN	Abduh Lestaluhu	5	0	0+5	0	0	0
Players transferred out during the season
7	FW	(Netherlands) NED	Melvin Platje	16	2	15+1	2	0	0
8	MF	(Indonesia) IDN	Muhammad Taufiq	2	0	0+2	0	0	0
23	MF	(Indonesia) IDN	Fahmi Al-Ayyubi	8	0	2+6	0	0	0

- Source: Match results
- Ordered by player's number.

=== Disciplinary record ===
No.	Pos	Nat	Player	Total			Liga 1			AFC Cup		
No.	Pos	Nat	Player	Yellow card	Second yellow card	Red card	Yellow card	Second yellow card	Red card	Yellow card	Second yellow card	Red card
1	GK	(Indonesia) IDN	Nadeo Argawinata	1	0	0	1	0	0	0	0	0
4	MF	(Indonesia) IDN	Ahmad Agung	1	0	0	1	0	0	0	0	0
5	DF	(Indonesia) IDN	Haudi Abdillah	3	0	0	3	0	0	0	0	0
6	MF	(Iraq) IRQ	Brwa Nouri	2	0	0	2	0	0	0	0	0
9	FW	(Indonesia) IDN	Ilija Spasojević	2	0	0	2	0	0	0	0	0
10	MF	(Indonesia) IDN	Stefano Lilipaly	1	0	0	1	0	0	0	0	0
11	MF	(Indonesia) IDN	Yabes Roni	2	0	0	2	0	0	0	0	0
14	MF	(Indonesia) IDN	Fadil Sausu	1	0	0	1	0	0	0	0	0
15	DF	(Indonesia) IDN	Gavin Kwan Adsit	1	0	0	1	0	0	0	0	0
16	MF	(Indonesia) IDN	Hariono	2	0	1	2	0	1	0	0	0
17	MF	(Indonesia) IDN	Sidik Saimima	2	0	0	2	0	0	0	0	0
18	MF	(Indonesia) IDN	I Kadek Agung Widnyana	1	0	0	1	0	0	0	0	0
19	MF	(Indonesia) IDN	Rizky Pellu	3	0	0	3	0	0	0	0	0
20	FW	(Indonesia) IDN	Lerby Eliandry	3	0	0	3	0	0	0	0	0
22	DF	(Indonesia) IDN	Dias Angga Putra	2	0	0	2	0	0	0	0	0
24	DF	(Indonesia) IDN	Ricky Fajrin	1	0	0	1	0	0	0	0	0
26	DF	(Indonesia) IDN	Komang Tri	1	0	0	1	0	0	0	0	0
27	MF	(Brazil) BRA	Éber Bessa	8	0	0	8	0	0	0	0	0
30	DF	(Indonesia) IDN	Eky Taufik	1	0	0	1	0	0	0	0	0
32	DF	(Indonesia) IDN	Leonard Tupamahu	5	0	1	5	0	1	0	0	0
33	DF	(Indonesia) IDN	I Made Andhika Wijaya	2	0	0	2	0	0	0	0	0
37	MF	(Cameroon) CMR	Privat Mbarga	2	0	0	2	0	0	0	0	0
43	DF	(Brazil) BRA	Willian Pacheco	6	1	0	6	1	0	0	0	0
59	GK	(Indonesia) IDN	Wawan Hendrawan	0	0	1	0	0	1	0	0	0
Players transferred out during the season
7	FW	(Netherlands) NED	Melvin Platje	2	0	0	2	0	0	0	0	0

- Source: Match results
- Ordered by player's number.
- (yellow card) = Number of bookings; (second yellow card) = Number of sending offs after a second yellow card; (red card) = Number of sending offs by a direct red card.

== Transfers ==
=== Transfers in ===
Date	Pos.	Name	From	Fee	Ref.
3 February 2021	MF	(Brazil) Diego Assis	Free agent	Free transfer	
24 February 2021	DF	(Indonesia) I Gede Agus Mahendra	Youth sector	Promoted	
18 March 2021	MF	(Indonesia) Rizky Pellu	PSM	Free transfer	
8 September 2021	MF	(Brazil) Éber Bessa	(Portugal) Nacional	Free transfer	
24 December 2021	MF	(Cameroon) Privat Mbarga	(Cambodia) Svay Rieng	Undisclosed	
6 January 2022	MF	(Indonesia) Irfan Jaya	PSS	Free transfer	

=== Transfers out ===
Date	Pos.	Name	To	Fee	Ref.
20 February 2021	DF	(Indonesia) Agus Nova Wiantara	Persis (Note: Joined on 27 April 2021.)	Free transfer	
26 February 2021	MF	(Indonesia) Kadek Haarlem Anggariva	Putra Tresna Bali (Note: Joined before 2021 Liga 3 Bali started.)	Free transfer	
26 February 2021	MF	(Indonesia) Rian Firmansyah	PSM (Note: Joined on 22 August 2021.)	Free transfer	
26 February 2021	MF	(Indonesia) Reza Irfana	PSIS (Note: Joined on 18 August 2021.)	Free transfer	
26 February 2021	DF	(Indonesia) Gusti Sandria	PSMS (Note: Joined on 15 March 2021.)	Free transfer	
18 March 2021	FW	(Indonesia) Hanis Saghara Putra	TIRA-Persikabo (Note: Joined on 20 March 2021.)	Free transfer	
28 April 2021	FW	(Indonesia) Irfan Jauhari	Persis (Note: Loaned before joined permanently.)	Free transfer	
30 April 2021	MF	(Indonesia) Arapenta Poerba	Persis	Free transfer	
29 July 2021	MF	(Brazil) Diego Assis	Free agent	Released	
24 December 2021	FW	(Netherlands) Melvin Platje	Bhayangkara (Note: Joined on 7 January 2022.)	Free transfer	

=== Loans in ===
Start date	Pos.	Name	From	End date	Ref.
14 September 2021	DF	(Indonesia) Reuben Silitonga	Persis	End of season	
7 January 2022	MF	(Indonesia) Ahmad Agung	Persik	End of season	
7 January 2022	DF	(Indonesia) Abduh Lestaluhu	Persis	End of season	
7 January 2022	DF	(Indonesia) Eky Taufik	Persis	End of season	

=== Loans out ===
Start date	Pos.	Name	To	End date	Ref.
1 February 2021	FW	(Netherlands) Melvin Platje	(Netherlands) De Graafschap	3 June 2021	
9 February 2021	MF	(Iraq) Brwa Nouri	(Iraq) Zakho	29 May 2021	
12 October 2021	FW	(Indonesia) Kadek Dimas Satria	PSIM	End of Liga 2 season	
22 December 2021	MF	(Indonesia) Muhammad Taufiq	Persik	End of Liga 1 season	
22 December 2021	MF	(Indonesia) Fahmi Al-Ayyubi	Persik	End of Liga 1 season	

== Awards ==
- Liga 1:
  - Player of the Month: Ilija Spasojević (September)
  - Top Goalscorer: Ilija Spasojević (23 goals)
  - Team of the Season: Éber Bessa, Brwa Nouri, Ilija Spasojević
