= Brwa Nouri =

Iraqi footballer (born 1987)

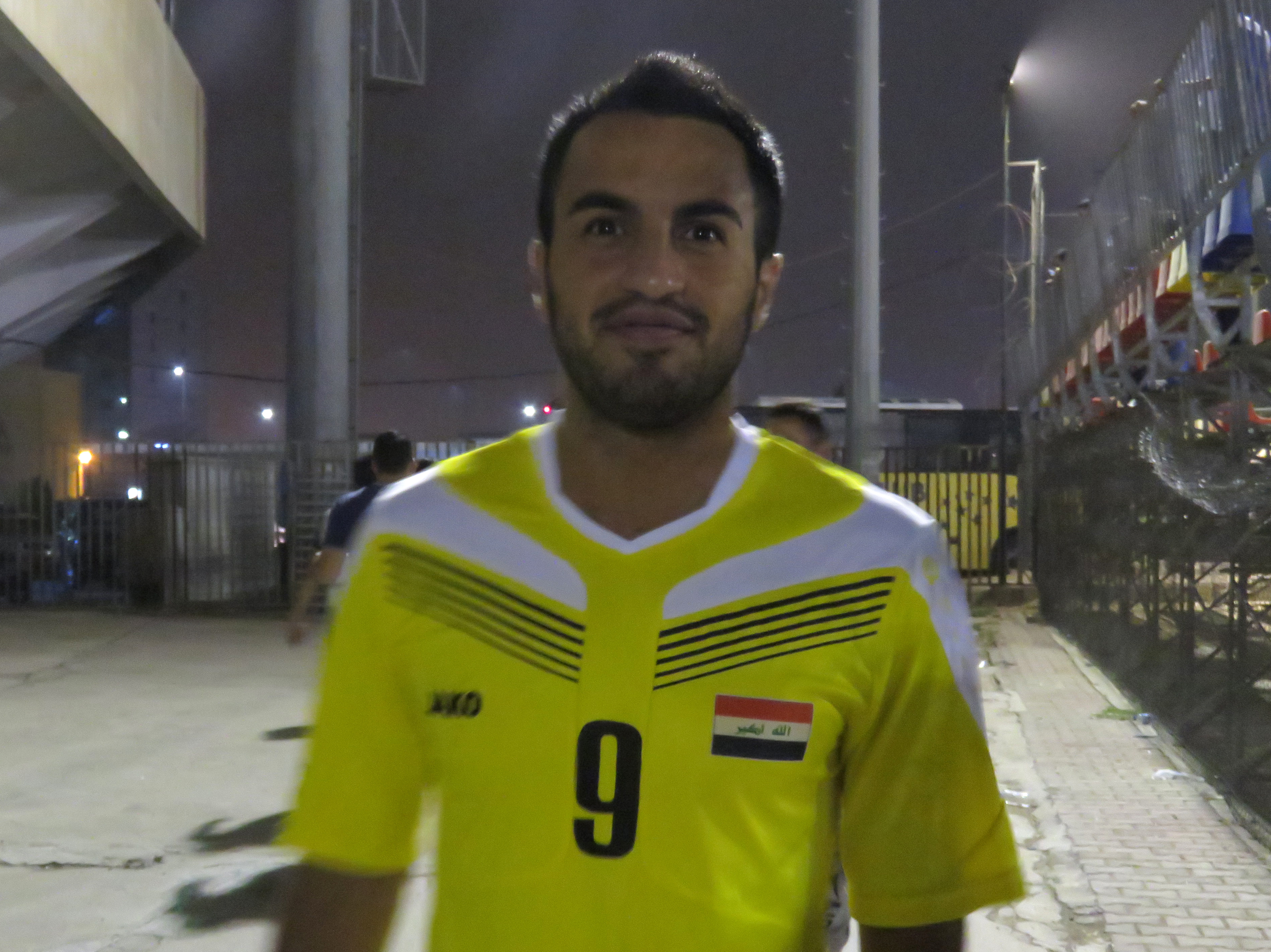
- Brwa with Iraq in 2016

Personal information
- Full name: Brwa Hekmat Nouri
- Date of birth: 23 January 1987 (age 39)
- Place of birth: Urmia, Iran
- Height: 1.77 m (5 ft 10 in)
- Position: Defensive midfielder

Team information
- Current team: AFC Malmö
- Number: 6

Youth career
- Vasalunds IF
- –2004: AIK

Senior career*
Years	Team	Apps	(Gls)
2004–2008	AIK	3	(0)
2006	→ Åtvidabergs FF (loan)	5	(1)
2007–2008	→ Väsby United (loan)	30	(2)
2008	→ Gröndals IK (loan)	10	(2)
2008–2013	Dalkurd	116	(37)
2014–2018	Östersund	121	(18)
2018–2023	Bali United	103	(1)
2021	→ Zakho (loan)		
2023	Dalkurd	16	(1)
2024–	AFC Malmö	83	(8)

International career
2003	Sweden U17	3	(0)
2004–2006	Sweden U19	3	(1)
2016–2018	Iraq	9	(1)
- * Club domestic league appearances and goals as of 16 November 2026

Brwa Hekmat Nouri (Kurdish: بڕوا نوری; born 23 January 1987) is an Iraqi professional footballer who plays as a defensive midfielder for Swedish Division 1 club AFC Malmö.

== Club career ==
Nouri was born in Urmia, Iran to Kurdish parents and moved with his family to Sweden as a child. He started his football career at Vasalund before joining AIK at the age of 13. He won the JSM final with AIK and where he scored in the final against Västra Frölunda.

He made his A-team debut in AIK on 7 October 2005, against Falkenberg in the Superettan. In 2006 he was with AIK's A-team but was loaned to Åtvidaberg. He returned to AIK after the season but then he was loaned out again, this time to Väsby United in 2007. In total, Nouri played three league matches in the Superettan, a match in the Svenska cupen and 16 training matches for AIK.

Prior to the 2009 season, Nouri signed for Dalkurd. In November 2011, he extended his contract with the club for two years.

=== Östersunds FK ===
In 2014, Brwa Nouri signed for Östersund, a team playing in the Superettan, the 2nd tier of Swedish football. He played his first game in the league against Ljungskile on 6 April 2014. Nouri quickly established himself as a vital part of the squad, and was the vice-captain of the club. Östersund finished the season in 5th place. In the next season, they finished second in the league table, and were promoted to the Allsvenskan. In their first season in the Allsvenskan, Brwa Nouri captained the team to an 8th-place finish and a historic Svenska Cupen victory, which saw them qualify to the Europa League qualifiers the following season.

ÖFK improved on their result the following season, finishing 5th in the Swedish league. ÖFK made headlines all around the world as they qualified to the group stages after defeating giants Galatasaray, where Brwa Nouri scored, Fola Esch, and PAOK, where Nouri also scored. ÖFK were drawn in group J alongside Athletic Bilbao, Hertha BSC, and Zorya Luhansk. ÖFK finished second in the group, level on points with Bilbao. Nouri became the first Iraqi to score in the Europa League when he scored the winner against Hertha Berlin. ÖFK were knocked out by Arsenal in the round of 32.

== International career ==
Nouri was born in Sulaymaniyah, Iraq to an Iraqi-Kurdish family. He was raised in Sweden and played for their youth national teams, but switched to the Iraq national team for World Cup Qualifiers in October 2016. Nouri made his formal debut for Iraq in a 0–0 friendly tie with Jordan. He played in Iraq for the first time ever on 5 October 2017, where he scored his first goal for Iraq.

== Career statistics ==
=== Club ===
As of 9 September 2023

Appearances and goals by club, season and competition
Club	Season	League			National Cup		Continental		Other		Total	
Club	Season	Division	Apps	Goals	Apps	Goals	Apps	Goals	Apps	Goals	Apps	Goals
Åtvidaberg (loan)	2006	Superettan	5	1	0	0	2	0	—		7	1
Väsby United (loan)	2007	Division 1	22	2	0	0	0	0	—		22	2
Väsby United (loan)	2008	Superettan	8	0	0	0	0	0	—		8	0
Väsby United (loan)	Total		30	2	0	0	0	0	0	0	30	2
Gröndal (loan)	2008	Division 1	10	2	0	0	0	0	—		10	2
Dalkurd	2009	Division 2	20	9	0	0	0	0	—		20	9
Dalkurd	2010	Division 1	26	10	1	0	0	0	—		27	10
Dalkurd	2011	Division 1	24	5	0	0	0	0	—		24	5
Dalkurd	2012	Division 1	24	6	0	0	0	0	—		24	6
Dalkurd	2013	Division 1	22	7	2	0	0	0	—		24	7
Dalkurd	Total		116	37	3	0	0	0	0	0	119	37
Östersund	2014	Superettan	27	2	4	0	0	0	—		31	2
Östersund	2015	Superettan	27	4	0	0	0	0	—		27	4
Östersund	2016	Allsvenskan	27	4	3	0	0	0	—		30	4
Östersund	2017	Allsvenskan	26	6	0	0	14	3	—		40	9
Östersund	2018	Allsvenskan	14	2	0	0	0	0	—		11	2
Östersund	Total		121	18	7	0	14	3	—		139	21
Bali United	2018	Liga 1	13	0	0	0	0	0	0	0	13	0
Bali United	2019	Liga 1	27	0	5	0	0	0	3 (Note: Appearances in President Cup)	0	35	0
Bali United	2020	Liga 1	3	0	0	0	5 (Note: Three appearances in AFC Cup, two appearances in AFC Champions League)	0	0	0	8	0
Bali United	2021–22	Liga 1	30	1	0	0	3 (Note: Appearances in AFC Cup)	0	2	0	35	1
Bali United	2022–23	Liga 1	28	0	0	0	0	0	2 (Note: Appearances in Asia Champions League Playoffs)	0	30	0
Bali United	2023–24	Liga 1	2	0	0	0	0	0	0	0	2	0
Bali United	Total		103	1	5	0	8	0	7	0	123	1
Dalkurd	2023	Ettan Fotboll	7	0	1	0	—		—		8	0
Career total			379	61	16	0	22	3	7	0	436	64

=== International ===
Scores and results list Iraq's goal tally first, score column indicates score after each Nouri goal.

List of international goals scored by Brwa Nouri
No.	Date	Venue	Opponent	Score	Result	Competition
1	5 October 2017	Basra International Stadium, Basra, Iraq	Kenya	1–0	2–1	Friendly

== Honours ==
Östersunds FK

- Svenska Cupen: 2016–17

Bali United

- Liga 1: 2019, 2021–22

Individual

- Liga 1 Team of the Season: 2021–22

== See also ==
- List of Iraq international footballers
