= Rohit Chand =

Nepalese footballer

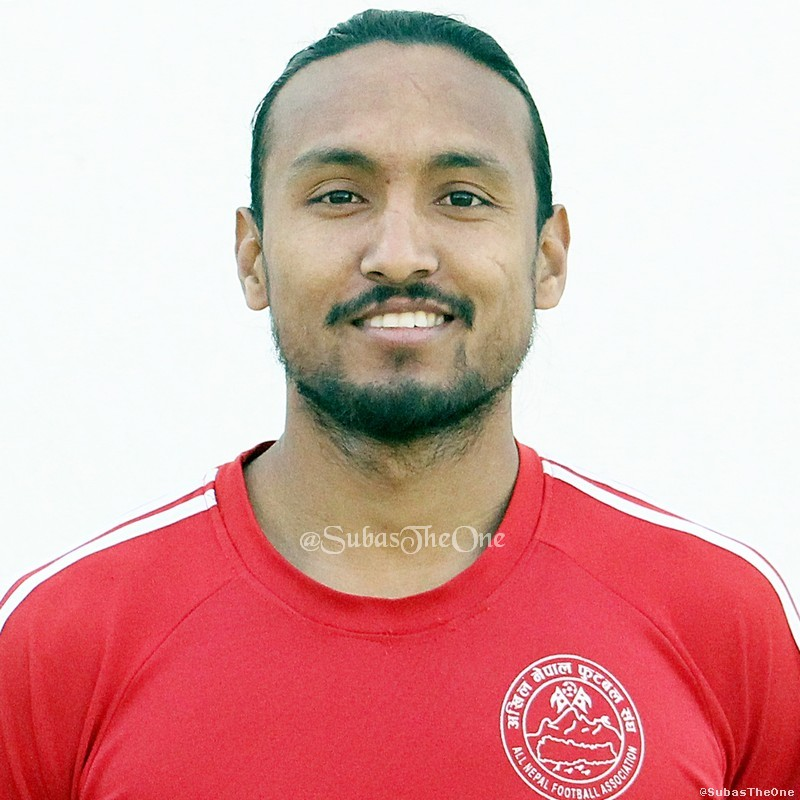
- Chand with Nepal in 2017

Personal information
- Full name: Rohit Chand Thakuri
- Date of birth: 1 March 1992 (age 34)
- Place of birth: Dailekh, Nepal
- Height: 1.79 m (5 ft 10 in)
- Position: Defensive midfielder

Team information
- Current team: Bashundhara Kings

Youth career
- 2005–2008: ANFA Academy

Senior career*
| Years | Team | Apps | (Gls) |
| 2009–2010 | Machhindra | 34 | (2) |
| 2010–2012 | HAL | 38 | (4) |
| 2012–2013 | PSPS Pekanbaru | 15 | (0) |
| 2013–2015 | Persija Jakarta | 46 | (6) |
| 2016 | T-Team | 0 | (0) |
| 2017 | Manang Marshyangdi | 9 | (0) |
| 2017–2022 | Persija Jakarta | 119 | (10) |
| 2022–2025 | Persik Kediri | 82 | (3) |
| 2026– | Bashundhara Kings | 0 | (0) |

International career^{‡}
| 2009–2010 | Nepal U19 | 34 | (2) |
| 2014–2018 | Nepal U23 | 5 | (0) |
| 2009– | Nepal | 104 (Note: Although the matches against India Olympic in 2009, Northern Mariana Islands in 2013, and the Philippines in 2014 were unofficial FIFA fixtures, they are regarded as official by the All Nepal Football Association.) | (2) |
Medal record
Men's football
Representing Nepal
SAFF Championship
| Runner-up | 2021 Maldives |
- * Club domestic league appearances and goals as of 29 August 2026 ‡ National team caps and goals as of 31 March 2026

Rohit Chand Thakuri (Nepali: रोहित चन्द; born 1 March 1992) is a Nepalese professional footballer who plays as a defensive midfielder for Bashundhara Kings and the Nepal national team.

During his teenage years, Chand was heavily linked to clubs such as Arsenal, Tottenham, and Lille. Chand was awarded The Best Player of The Year in Liga 1 2018 (the highest level of Indonesia football competition) as well as becoming champion with Persija Jakarta.

== Early years ==
Rohit Chand Thakuri was born in Dailekh, Nepal. He started playing football at the age of eight with his brother Rabin Chand Thakuri, who is also a semi-professional footballer. At the age of 13, he was selected for ANFA academy. Chand's tour of Iran with the U-16 national team in 2008 was the turning point of his career. At the age of 16, Chand was called up to the senior national team even though he had not played any games at the club and U-19 level. This allowed Chand to propel his professional football career quickly in Nepal.

== Club career ==
=== Machhindra F.C. ===
Chand's first professional club in Nepal's top flight was Machhindra. Chand's play had brought him four Man of the Match awards during the league campaign and his play at the back had been one of the highlights of Machhindra's season. The young stopper has led a defense that doesn't leak too many goals, but he also can be a threat moving up the pitch. Chand had shown his leadership qualities and captained Machhindra. He was awarded best defender of the year award for his spectacular play during the 2067B.S.(2010–11) league season. Machhindra also reached the semifinals of the British Gurkha Cup that season.

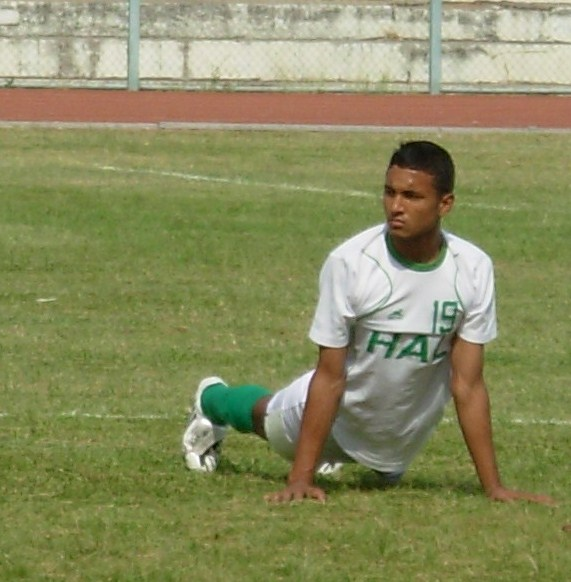
Chand training with HAL in 2011

=== Hindustan Aeronautics Limited SC ===
On 2 January 2012, it was reported that Chand had signed a 6-month contract with the club after trying his luck in Europe. In April, Chand scored a hat-trick in I-League match but despite his efforts his team went on to lose the match. And his efforts were not enough to prevent HAL from relegation in the I-League. His contract at HAL expired in 2012 after they were relegated from the top tier of I-League.

=== PSPS Pekanbaru ===
Rohit Chand gave a trial at Indonesia Liga side Arema where he was able to give an average performance, although he was not selected by the team. Later he was signed by another Indonesian side PSPS Pekanbaru on a 10 months.

=== Persija Jakarta ===
In May 2013 he signed a 5-month contract with the Indonesian side Persija Jakarta in the Indonesia Super League. He was then nominated for the Young player of the year award for the same season in the Indonesian league.

=== FC Vestsjælland ===
Rohit has trained with the club for more than one and half months until 25 December 2013. He was offered with 6 months contract for reserved team as like Indian Goalkeeper Subrata Pal. Rohit's Manager Rabindra Chand denied the offer and placed Rohit to ISL club.

=== T-Team ===
Rohit signed a year deal with Malaysian Outfit T-Team in January 2016.

=== Return to Persija Jakarta ===
After a brief spell for local Nepalese club Manang Marshyangdi, it was announced that Chand had returned to Indonesian club, Persija Jakarta. He signed a new two-year contract with the club and Rohit will be staying in Persija Jakarta until the end of 2022. In his second spell at the club, Chand brought the club to win the 2018 Liga 1 season. It was Chand's first league title in his career. For that achievement, he was awarded as the Best Player of the Year.

Chand left the club after the 2021–2022 season. He holds the record as the longest Asian foreign player to play for Persija Jakarta, serving the capital’s club in two periods (i.e. 2013–2015 and 2017–2022).

=== Persik Kediri ===
After he left Persija Jakarta, Chand sign with another Indonesian club, Persik Kediri on 22 May 2022. He is the vice-captain of the squad. Rohit has played 56 matches and scored three goals for Persik.

== International career ==
Chand is the youngest player to play the full senior level tournament for Nepal, making his debut on 23 March 2009 (17 years 22 days) against Palestine in the AFC which was later broke by Bimal Gharti Magar. He also made many appearances in different age groups (U-17 and U-19 age). Rohit was named the vice-captain of the national team in 2015.

Chand scored his first international goal on 16 November 2024 against Afghanistan in a friendly at the Respublikansky Stadion. A year later, on 9 October, he made his 100th international appearance in a 3–1 away defeat against Vietnam during the 2027 AFC Asian Cup qualification, becoming the second Nepalese player to achieve this feat following his teammate Kiran Chemjong.

== Career statistics ==
=== International ===
As of match played 31 March 2026

Appearances and goals by national team and year
| National team | Year | Apps | Goals |
|---|---|---|---|
| Nepal | 2009 | 6 | 0 |
| Nepal | 2011 | 13 | 0 |
| Nepal | 2012 | 8 | 0 |
| Nepal | 2013 | 7 | 0 |
| Nepal | 2014 | 4 | 0 |
| Nepal | 2015 | 6 | 0 |
| Nepal | 2017 | 6 | 0 |
| Nepal | 2018 | 5 | 0 |
| Nepal | 2019 | 9 | 0 |
| Nepal | 2021 | 11 | 0 |
| Nepal | 2022 | 2 | 0 |
| Nepal | 2023 | 13 | 0 |
| Nepal | 2024 | 4 | 1 |
| Nepal | 2025 | 9 | 1 |
| Nepal | 2026 | 1 | 0 |
| Total | | 104 | 2 |

Scores and results list Nepal's goal tally first, score column indicates score after each Chand goal.

| No. | Date | Venue | Opponent | Score | Result | Competition |
|---|---|---|---|---|---|---|
| 1. | 16 November 2024 | Central Republican Stadium, Dushanbe, Tajikistan | Afghanistan | 2–0 | 2–0 | Friendly |
| 2. | 13 November 2025 | National Stadium, Dhaka, Bangladesh | Bangladesh | 1–0 | 2–2 | Friendly |

== Honours ==
Persija Jakarta

- Liga 1: 2018
- Indonesia President's Cup: 2018
- Menpora Cup: 2021
- Piala Indonesia runner-up: 2018–19

Nepal

- Three Nations Cup: 2021
- SAFF Championship runner-up: 2021

Individual

- Special Award of the Year – Pulsar NSJF Sports Award (Nepal): 2019
- Liga 1 Best Player: 2018
- Liga 1 Best XI: 2018
- Martyr's Memorial A-Division League Best Defender: 2010
- Three Nations Cup: Best Player: 2021
- Menpora Cup Best Eleven: 2021

== Personal life ==
Chand hails from Birendra Nagar in Surkhet District. His idol is Paolo Maldini. Aside from football Chand is also an avid reader and enjoys novels, and also loves pets having a dog named Roger.

== See also ==
- List of men's footballers with 100 or more international caps
