= Dillan Rinaldi =

Indonesian footballer (born 2005)

Personal information
- Full name: Dillan Yabran Rinaldi
- Date of birth: 1 June 2005 (age 21)
- Place of birth: Cologne, Germany
- Height: 1.75 m (5 ft 9 in)
- Position: Winger

Team information
- Current team: Bali United

Youth career
- –2024: SV Bergisch Gladbach 09

Senior career*
Years	Team	Apps	(Gls)
2024–	Bali United	1	(0)
2025–2026	→ Persikad Depok (loan)	1	(0)

International career^{‡}
2024	Indonesia U20	1	(0)
- * Club domestic league appearances and goals as of 9 November 2025 ‡ National team caps and goals as of 25 March 2024

Dillan Yabran Rinaldi (born 1 June 2005) is a professional footballer who plays as a winger for Super League club Bali United. Born in Germany, he is an Indonesia youth international.

== Early life ==
Rinaldi was born on 1 June 2005 in Cologne, Germany. Born to Indonesian parents, his family originate from Aceh, Indonesia and he can speak fluent Indonesian.

== Club career ==
As a youth player, Rinaldi joined the youth academy of German side SV Bergisch Gladbach 09. Subsequently, he signed for Indonesian side Bali United in 2024. On 12 January 2025, he debuted for the club during a 1–3 home loss to Persik Kediri in the league.

== International career ==
Rinaldi is an Indonesia youth international. On 25 March 2024, he debuted for the Indonesia national under-20 football team during a 1–1 home friendly draw with the China national under-20 football team. In 2024, he was called up to the Indonesia national under-20 football team for the 2024 Maurice Revello Tournament preliminary squad but did not make the final squad.

== Style of play ==
Rinaldi plays as a winger. Indonesian newspaper Jawa Pos wrote in 2024 that his "ability to play with both feet and his agility in the attacking midfielder and left wing positions make him a valuable asset".
