= Agung Mannan =

Indonesian footballer

Personal information
- Full name: Agung Mannan
- Date of birth: 6 August 1998 (age 28)
- Place of birth: Pangkep, Indonesia
- Height: 1.75 m (5 ft 9 in)
- Positions: Centre-back; left-back

Team information
- Current team: PSM makassar
- Number: 47

Senior career*
Years	Team	Apps	(Gls)
2017–2019	Martapura	8	(0)
2018	→ Persinga Ngawi (loan)		
2021	Persijap Jepara	4	(0)
2022–2023	PSM Makassar	27	(0)
2023–2025	Dewa United	24	(1)
2025	→ Bali United (loan)	7	(0)
2025–2026	Persis Solo	6	(0)
2026–	PSM Makassar	0	(0)
- * Club domestic league appearances and goals as of 15 July 2026

Agung Mannan (born 6 August 1998) is an Indonesian professional footballer who plays as a centre-back for Super League club PSM Makassar.

== Club career ==
=== Persijap Jepara ===
On 2021, Mannan signed a one-year contract with Liga 2 club Persijap Jepara. He made 4 league appearances for Persijap Japara in the 2021 Liga 2 (Indonesia).

=== PSM Makassar ===
He was signed for PSM Makassar to play in Liga 1 in the 2022 season. Mannan made his league debut on 23 July 2022 in a match against PSS Sleman at the Maguwoharjo Stadium, Sleman.

=== Dewa United ===
Mannan was signed for Dewa United to play in Liga 1 in the 2023–24 season. He made his debut on 2 July 2023 in a match against Arema at the Indomilk Arena, Tangerang. On 10 June 2025, Mannan officially left Dewa United.

== Career statistics ==
=== Club ===
As of 23 January 2026.

Club	Season	League			Cup		Continental		Other		Total	
Club	Season	Division	Apps	Goals	Apps	Goals	Apps	Goals	Apps	Goals	Apps	Goals
Persijap Jepara	2021–22	Liga 2	4	0	0	0	0	0	0	0	4	0
PSM Makassar	2022–23	Liga 1	27	0	0	0	2 (Note: Appearances in AFC Cup)	0	2 (Note: Appearances in Indonesia President's Cup)	0	31	0
Dewa United	2023–24	Liga 1	23	1	0	0	0	0	0	0	23	1
Dewa United	2024–25	Liga 1	1	0	0	0	–		0	0	1	0
Bali United (loan)	2024–25	Liga 1	7	0	0	0	0	0	0	0	7	0
Persis Solo	2025–26	Super League	6	0	0	0	–		0	0	6	0
Career total			68	1	0	0	2	0	2	0	72	1

== Honours ==
PSM Makassar

- Liga 1: 2022–23
