= Kenzo Nambu =

Japanese footballer

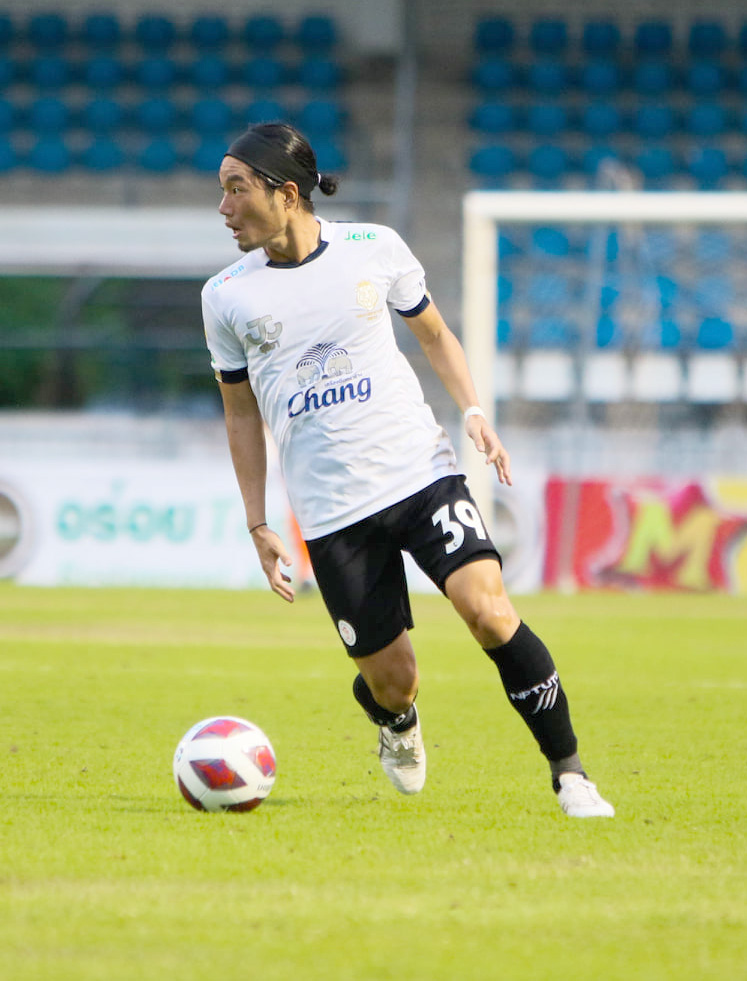
- Nambu with Nakhon Pathom United in 2021

Personal information
- Full name: Kenzo Nambu
- Date of birth: 22 August 1992 (age 34)
- Place of birth: Hachiōji, Japan
- Height: 1.73 m (5 ft 8 in)
- Positions: Attacking midfielder; winger

Youth career
- 2005–2010: Tokyo Verdy

College career
Years	Team	Apps	(Gls)
2011–2014	Chukyo University		

Senior career*
Years	Team	Apps	(Gls)
2015	Kataller Toyama	2	(0)
2016–2017	Briobecca Urayasu	48	(9)
2018–2019	FC Osaka	26	(5)
2019	Kasetsart	13	(5)
2019–2020	Customs United	17	(7)
2020–2021	Uthai Thani	8	(1)
2021	Nakhon Pathom United	10	(5)
2021–2022	Rayong	17	(9)
2022–2024	PSM Makassar	62	(23)
2024	Bali United	13	(1)
2025	Borneo Samarinda	9	(0)
2026	Persipal Palu	9	(1)
- * Club domestic league appearances and goals as of 3 May 2026

Kenzo Nambu (南部 健造, Nambu Kenzo; born 22 August 1992) is a Japanese professional footballer who plays as an attacking midfielder or winger.

== Playing career ==
Kenzo Nambu joined to J3 League club Kataller Toyama in 2015. In 2016, he moved to Briobecca Urayasu.

Kenzo moved to the Liga 1 in June 2022, going on to remain several years in the country with PSM Makassar. He scored his first goal for the club on the match day of the 2022–23 season against Persija Jakarta on August 5, 2022. Under the guidance coach Bernardo Tavares, Kenzo won his first title of Liga 1 with PSM Makassar. The title was won after defeating Madura United 3–1 on March 31, 2023.

== Club statistics ==
Updated to 20 February 2018.

Club performance			League		Cup		Total	
Season	Club	League	Apps	Goals	Apps	Goals	Apps	Goals
Japan			League		Emperor's Cup		Total	
2015	Kataller Toyama	J3 League	2	0	–		2	0
2016	Briobecca Urayasu	JFL	18	2	–		18	2
2017	Briobecca Urayasu	JFL	30	7	2	1	32	8
Total			50	9	2	1	59	10

== Honours ==
PSM Makassar

- Liga 1: 2022–23

Individual

- Liga 1 Goal of the Month: October 2023
