= Reuben Silitonga =

Indonesian association football player

Personal information
- Full name: Reuben Raya Rivera Silitonga
- Date of birth: 27 March 1991 (age 35)
- Place of birth: Manila, Philippines
- Height: 1.80 m (5 ft 11 in)
- Position: Defender

Youth career
- Villa 2000

Senior career*
Years	Team	Apps	(Gls)
2014	Tjørring IF		
2014	Global	6	(0)
2014–2015	Loyola	12	(0)
2015–2016	Pachanga Diliman	11	(0)
2016	Stallion Laguna	3	(0)
2021	Persis Solo	0	(0)
2021–2022	→ Bali United (loan)	0	(0)
2022	Persikab Bandung	1	(0)
- * Club domestic league appearances and goals as of 11:48, 1 October 2022 (UTC)

Reuben Raya Rivera Silitonga (born 27 March 1991), is an Indonesian former footballer who plays as a defender.

== Early career ==
Silitonga is a former youth player of Villa 2000.

== Club career ==
In 2014, Silitonga started his career with Denmark club Tjørring IF.

He was signed for Global Cebu to play in United Football League in the 2014 season.

After his release from Global Cebu, Silitonga signed with United Football League club Layola on 21 September 2014.

Silitonga was released by Layola in January 2015.

Silitonga was released by Stallion Laguna in 2016. He switched his focus to being an entrepreneur and left football. In 2021, after 5 years of absence Reuben returned to the world of football.

He was signed for Indonesian Liga 2 club Persis Solo.

== Honours ==
=== Club ===
Bali United

- Liga 1: 2021–22
