= Muhammad Kemaluddin =

Indonesian association footballer

Personal information
- Full name: Muhammad Kemaluddin
- Date of birth: 28 April 1999 (age 27)
- Place of birth: Temanggung, Indonesia
- Height: 1.67 m (5 ft 6 in)
- Position: Defensive midfielder

Team information
- Current team: Semen Padang
- Number: 18

Youth career
- PPLP Central Java
- 2019: Persebaya Surabaya U20

Senior career*
Years	Team	Apps	(Gls)
2020–2021	Persebaya Surabaya	0	(0)
2021	→ Hizbul Wathan (loan)	9	(0)
2022–2024	Persikabo 1973	28	(0)
2024–2026	Madura United	6	(0)
2026	→ Sumsel United (loan)	8	(0)
2026–	Semen Padang	1	(0)
- * Club domestic league appearances and goals as of 13 September 2026

Muhammad Kemaluddin (born 28 April 1999) is an Indonesian professional footballer who plays as a defensive midfielder for Championship club Semen Padang.

== Club career ==
=== Persebaya Surabaya ===
Born in 1999, Kemaluddin started his football career at PPLP Central Java. After playing there, he then joined Persebaya Surabaya juniors continuing to join Persebaya U20 in 2019 who competed in Elite Pro Academy, His brilliant performance as a defensive midfielder made him promoted to the Persebaya Surabaya first team in 2020. He made his Persebaya debut on 23 March 2021 in a pre-season 2021 Menpora Cup 2–1 win against Persik Kediri at the Jalak Harupat Stadium, Bandung.

==== Hizbul Wathan (loan) ====
In May 2021, Kemaluddin was signed for Hizbul Wathan to play in Liga 2 in the 2021–23 season, on loan from Persebaya Surabaya. He was loaned out because he wanted to play more minutes. He made his league debut on 27 September 2021 in a 1–1 draw against Persijap Jepara at the Manahan Stadium, Surakarta.

=== Persikabo 1973 ===
In June 2022, Kemaluddin signed a contract with Liga 1 club Persikabo 1973. Kemaluddin made his Liga 1 debut on 9 December 2022 in a 1–1 draw against RANS Nusantara.

== Career statistics ==
=== Club ===
As of 13 September 2026.

Club	Season	League			Cup		Continental		Other		Total	
Club	Season	Division	Apps	Goals	Apps	Goals	Apps	Goals	Apps	Goals	Apps	Goals
Persebaya Surabaya	2020	Liga 1	0	0	0	0	–		0	0	0	0
Persebaya Surabaya	2021–22	Liga 1	0	0	0	0	–		3 (Note: Appearances in 2021 Menpora Cup)	0	3	0
Hizbul Wathan (loan)	2021–22	Liga 2	9	0	0	0	–		0	0	9	0
Persikabo 1973	2022–23	Liga 1	11	0	0	0	–		0	0	11	0
Persikabo 1973	2023–24	Liga 1	17	0	0	0	–		0	0	17	0
Madura United	2024–25	Liga 1	5	0	0	0	–		0	0	5	0
Madura United	2025–26	Super League	1	0	0	0	–		0	0	1	0
Sumsel United (loan)	2025–26	Championship	8	0	0	0	–		0	0	8	0
Semen Padang	2026–27	Championship	1	0	0	0	–		0	0	1	0
Career total			52	0	0	0	0	0	3	0	55	0
