= Tegar Infantrie =

Indonesian footballer

Personal information
- Full name: Tegar Infantrie Sukamto
- Date of birth: 8 May 1999 (age 27)
- Place of birth: Semarang, Indonesia
- Height: 1.75 m (5 ft 9 in)
- Position: Defensive midfielder

Team information
- Current team: Persijap Jepara
- Number: 16

Youth career
- PPLP Jateng
- PSIS Semarang

Senior career*
Years	Team	Apps	(Gls)
2016–2021	PSIS Semarang	23	(0)
2021	RANS Cilegon	3	(0)
2022–2023	Persikabo 1973	30	(0)
2023–2025	Bali United	4	(0)
2024–2025	→ Barito Putera (loan)	15	(0)
2025–2026	Persita Tangerang	0	(0)
2026	→ PSIS Semarang (loan)	9	(0)
2026–	Persijap Jepara	3	(0)
- * Club domestic league appearances and goals as of 20 September 2026

Tegar Infantrie Sukamto (born 8 May 1999) is an Indonesian professional footballer who plays as a defensive midfielder for Super League club Persijap Jepara.

== Club career ==
=== PSIS Semarang ===
PSIS Semarang was his first professional club after playing with the junior team, he made his debut in a match against Persipon Pontianak replacing Muhamad Yunus.

=== RANS Cilegon ===
In 2021, Infantrie signed a contract with Indonesian Liga 2 club RANS Cilegon. He made his league debut on 28 September against Dewa United.

=== Persikabo 1973 ===
Infantrie was signed for Persikabo 1973 to play in Liga 1 in the 2022–23 season. He made his league debut on 25 July 2022 in a match against Persebaya Surabaya at the Pakansari Stadium, Cibinong.

== Career statistics ==
=== Club ===
As of 20 September 2026

Club	Season	League			Cup (Note: Includes Piala Indonesia.)		Continental		Other		Total	
Club	Season	Division	Apps	Goals	Apps	Goals	Apps	Goals	Apps	Goals	Apps	Goals
PSIS Semarang	2017	Liga 2	7	0	0	0	0	0	0	0	7	0
PSIS Semarang	2018	Liga 1	0	0	0	0	0	0	0	0	0	0
PSIS Semarang	2019	Liga 1	16	0	1	0	0	0	0	0	17	0
PSIS Semarang	2020	Liga 1	0	0	0	0	0	0	0	0	0	0
RANS Cilegon	2021	Liga 2	3	0	0	0	0	0	0	0	3	0
Persikabo 1973	2022–23	Liga 1	30	0	0	0	0	0	0	0	30	0
Bali United	2023–24	Liga 1	4	0	0	0	—		0	0	4	0
Barito Putera (loan)	2024–25	Liga 1	15	0	0	0	—		0	0	15	0
Persita Tangerang	2025–26	Super League	0	0	0	0	—		0	0	0	0
PSIS Semarang (loan)	2025–26	Championship	9	0	0	0	—		0	0	9	0
Persijap Jepara	2026–27	Super League	3	0	0	0	—		0	0	3	0
Career total			87	0	1	0	0	0	0	0	88	0

== Honours ==
=== Club ===
PSIS Semarang

- Liga 2 third place (play-offs): 2017
