= Gede Sunu =

Indonesian footballer (born 2002)

Personal information
- Full name: I Gede Sunu Jyesta Wibawa
- Date of birth: 28 April 2002 (age 24)
- Place of birth: Denpasar, Bali, Indonesia
- Height: 1.71 m (5 ft 7 in)
- Position: Midfielder

Team information
- Current team: Perseden Denpasar
- Number: 23

Youth career
- 2017: Perseden Denpasar
- 2018–2020: Bali United

Senior career*
Years	Team	Apps	(Gls)
2023–2025	Bali United	2	(1)
2026	Persekat Tegal	2	(0)
2026–	Perseden Denpasar	0	(0)
- * Club domestic league appearances and goals as of 23:00, 2 May 2026 (UTC)

I Gede Sunu Jyesta Wibawa (born on 24 April 2002), simply known as Gede Sunu, is an Indonesian professional footballer who plays as a midfielder for Liga Nusantara club Perseden Denpasar.

== Career ==
=== Bali United ===
Sunu made his debut at the group stage of 2023–24 AFC Cup against Stallion Laguna on 20 September 2023. He made his Liga 1 debut on 24 February 2024 against PSM Makassar.

== Career statistics ==
=== Club ===
As of 2 May 2026.

Club	Season	League		Cup		Continental		Other		Total	
Club	Season	Apps	Goals	Apps	Goals	Apps	Goals	Apps	Goals	Apps	Goals
Bali United	2023–24	2	1	0	0	3	0	0	0	5	1
Bali United	2024–25	0	0	0	0	0	0	0	0	0	0
Bali United	2025–26	0	0	0	0	–		0	0	0	0
Persekat Tegal	2025–26	2	0	0	0	0	0	0	0	2	0
Career total		4	1	0	0	3	0	0	0	7	1
