= Jefferson Assis =

Brazilian footballer (born 1994)

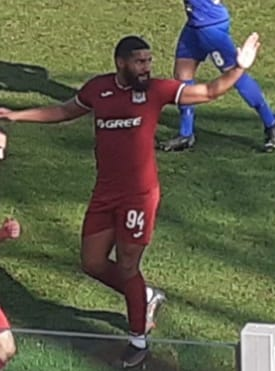
- Jefferson playing with Gżira United in 2023

Personal information
- Full name: Jefferson Mateus de Assis Estácio
- Date of birth: 21 October 1994 (age 32)
- Place of birth: Porto Alegre, Brazil
- Height: 1.85 m (6 ft 1 in)
- Position: Forward

Team information
- Current team: Valletta
- Number: 94

Senior career*
Years	Team	Apps	(Gls)
2013	Grêmio Osasco	1	(0)
2015	Barbarense	6	(0)
2015–2016	Coritiba	12	(2)
2016	→ Andraus (loan)	2	(0)
2016–2017	Novo Hamburgo	4	(1)
2017	São José	1	(0)
2017–2019	Sliema Wanderers	31	(10)
2019	→ Nadur Youngsters (loan)	0	(0)
2019–2023	Gżira United	79	(44)
2020	→ Fujairah (loan)	7	(1)
2023–2024	Bali United	30	(12)
2024–2025	Lamphun Warriors	24	(6)
2025–	Valletta	8	(1)
- * Club domestic league appearances and goals as of 6 October 2025

Jefferson Mateus de Assis Estácio (born 21 October 1994) is a Brazilian professional footballer who plays as a forward for Maltese Premier League club Valletta.

== Career ==
Jefferson joined Maltese Challenge League side Sliema Wanderers for the 2017 season.

On 29 January 2019, he was loaned to Nadur Youngsters for the 2019 season.

In mid-2019 season, Jefferson signed with Gżira United.

During 2020, he was loaned to UAE Pro League club Fujairah for 6 months.

He contributed with 25 league appearances and 20 goals for Gżira United during the 2022–23 season. Through these results, Jefferson won the top goalscorer award.

On 5 July 2023, Bali United announced a deal for Jefferson to join Indonesian Liga 1 club Bali United on a fee transfer.

== Honours ==
Novo Hamburgo

- Campeonato Gaúcho: 2017

Individual

- Maltese Premier League Top Goalscorer: 2022–23
