= Taufik Hidayat (footballer, born 1999) =

Indonesian footballer

Personal information
- Full name: Taufik Hidayat
- Date of birth: 16 December 1999 (age 26)
- Place of birth: Bandung, Indonesia
- Height: 1.79 m (5 ft 10 in)
- Position: Forward

Team information
- Current team: PSMS Medan
- Number: 17

Youth career
- 2017: Persikab Bandung
- 2018: Semen Padang
- 2019: Sriwijaya

Senior career*
Years	Team	Apps	(Gls)
2019–2022	Persija Jakarta	38	(3)
2023	Madura United	9	(0)
2023–2025	Bali United	2	(1)
2025–2026	Garudayaksa	20	(3)
2026–	PSMS Medan	0	(0)

International career^{‡}
2021	Indonesia U23	4	(1)
- * Club domestic league appearances and goals as of 9 May 2026 ‡ National team caps and goals as of 26 October 2021

Taufik Hidayat (born 16 December 1999) is an Indonesian professional footballer who plays as a forward for Championship club PSMS Medan.

== Club career ==
=== Persija Jakarta ===
On 21 May 2019, Persija Jakarta announced a deal for Taufiq to join Indonesian Liga 1 club Persija on a free transfer. Taufiq was brought in by Persija Jakarta to fulfill the quota of seven U-23 players who were the players' requirements in 2019 season. He promised to forget the thick rivalry between Persija and Persib Bandung. After this, he will do his utmost for the Kemayoran Tiger. He made his professional debut in the Liga 1 on 16 October 2019, against Semen Padang where he played as a substitute.

On 26 January 2022, Taufik scored his first league goal in a 2–1 win over Persita Tangerang at the Ngurah Rai Stadium. On 17 March 2022, he scored in a 1–3 lose over Madura United. Nine days later, he scored the opening goal in a 1–1 draw over Bhayangkara. On 24 July 2022, Taufik scored the opening goal in the first half of the Jakarta International Stadium Grand Launching event match against Thai League 1 club Chonburi, which ended in a 3–3 draw.

=== Madura United ===
Taufik Hidayat became Madura United's in half of the 2022–23 Liga 1. Taufik made his debut on 14 January 2023 in a match against Barito Putera at the Demang Lehman Stadium, Martapura.

== International career ==
In October 2021, Taufik was called up to the Indonesia U23 in a friendly match against Tajikistan and Nepal and also prepared for 2022 AFC U-23 Asian Cup qualification in Tajikistan by Shin Tae-yong. On 26 October 2021, Taufik made his debut for Indonesia U-23 national team against Australia U-23 which he scored one goal in that match, in a 2–3 lose in the 2022 AFC U-23 Asian Cup qualification.

== Career statistics ==
=== Club ===
As of 2 May 2026

Club	Season	League			Cup		Continental		Other		Total	
Club	Season	Division	Apps	Goals	Apps	Goals	Apps	Goals	Apps	Goals	Apps	Goals
Persija Jakarta	2019	Liga 1	2	0	0	0	–		0	0	2	0
Persija Jakarta	2020	Liga 1	0	0	0	0	–		0	0	0	0
Persija Jakarta	2021–22	Liga 1	28	3	0	0	–		2 (Note: Appearances in Menpora Cup)	1	30	4
Persija Jakarta	2022–23	Liga 1	8	0	0	0	–		2 (Note: Appearances in Indonesia President's Cup)	0	10	0
Persija Jakarta	Total		38	3	0	0	—		4	1	42	4
Madura United	2022–23	Liga 1	9	0	0	0	—		0	0	9	0
Bali United	2023–24	Liga 1	1	1	0	0	2	0	0	0	3	1
Bali United	2024–25	Liga 1	1	0	0	0	—		0	0	1	0
Bali United	Total		2	1	0	0	2	0	0	0	4	1
Garudayaksa	2025–26	Championship	20	3	0	0	0	0	0	0	11	2
Career total			69	6	0	0	2	0	4	1	75	7

=== International goals ===
International under-23 goals

Goal	Date	Venue	Opponent	Score	Result	Competition
1	26 October 2021	Central Republican Stadium, Dushanbe, Tajikistan	Australia	2–3	2–3	2022 AFC U-23 Asian Cup qualification

== Honours ==
Persija Jakarta

- Menpora Cup: 2021

Garudayaksa

- Championship: 2025–26
