= 2024–25 Persija Jakarta season =

Persija Jakarta
2024–25 season
- Owner: PT Persija Jaya Jakarta
- Director: Mohamad Prapanca
- Manager: (Spain) Carlos González Peña (from 29 June 2024 until 1 May 2025) (Indonesia) Ricky Nelson (Caretaker)
- Stadium: Jakarta International Stadium; Gelora Bung Karno Main Stadium
- Liga 1: 7th
- Top goalscorer: League: Gustavo Almeida dos Santos (18); All: Gustavo Almeida dos Santos (18)
- Highest home attendance: 39,395 vs Persebaya Surabaya, 12 April 2025, Liga 1
- Lowest home attendance: 0 vs PSM Makassar, 28 September 2024, Liga 1; 0 vs PSIS Semarang, 5 March 2025, Liga 1; 0 vs Arema F.C., 9 March 2025, Liga 1
- Average home league attendance: 15,414
- Biggest win: 4–1 vs Madura United F.C. (H), 6 November 2024, Liga 1; 3–0 vs PS Barito Putera (H), 10 August 2024, Liga 1; 3–0 vs Bali United F.C. (H), 10 May 2025, Liga 1
- Biggest defeat: 1–3 vs PSBS Biak (A), 12 September 2024, Liga 1; 1–3 vs Bali United F.C. (A), 15 December 2024, Liga 1; 1–3 vs Arema F.C. (H), 9 March 2025, Liga 1; 0–2 vs Persib Bandung (A), 23 September 2024, Liga 1; 0–2 vs Semen Padang F.C. (H), 27 April 2025, Liga 1
Home colours	Away colours	Third colours
- All statistics correct as of 28 May 2025.

The 2024–25 season is Persija's 91st competitive season. They have not been relegated since the Perserikatan competition started in 1933. This season is Persija's 30th consecutive seasons in top-flight since professional competition formed on 1994. The season covers the period from 1 July 2024 to 31 June 2025. This season Persija passes club license for AFC Champions League 2 and AFC Challenge League for season 2024–25. PSSI through the Club Licensing Committee meeting held in Jakarta, Wednesday 15 May 2024 decided several things regarding the 2023/2024 licensing season. The first decision was to regulate the AFC Champions League 2 stating that Persija meet the conditions set out in the PSSI Club Licensing Regulation with Granted with Sanction status. Later, the second decision was to regulate the AFC Challenge League and Liga 1 stated that Persija meet the conditions that have been set in PSSI Club Licensing Regulation.

== Coaching staff ==
Position	Staff
Manager	(Indonesia) Bambang Pamungkas
Head Coach	(Indonesia) Ricky Nelson Gideon (Caretaker)
Assistant Head Coach	(Indonesia) Sopian Hadi
Goalkeeper Coach	(Indonesia) Hendro Kartiko
Fitness Coach	(Indonesia) Ilham Ralibi, S.Pd.
Individual Development Coach	(Indonesia) Ferdiansyah
Video Analyst	(Indonesia) Dzikri Lazuardy
Statistician	(Indonesia) Dani Budi Rayoga
Opposition/Player Scouting	(Indonesia) Petrick Sinuraya
Team Doctor	(Indonesia) Muhammad Andeansyah
Nutritionist	(Indonesia) Emilia Achmadi, MS RDN
Physiotherapist	(Indonesia) Muhamad Yanizar Lubis (Indonesia) Jeremiah Halomoan S
Masseur	(Indonesia) Akhmad Aditya Subkhi (Indonesia) Aditya Yulistyawan
Kitman	(Indonesia) Aries Tri Kurniawan (Indonesia) Candra Darmawan

=== Management ===
Director	(Indonesia) Mohammad Prapanca
Financial Director	(Indonesia) Koko Afiat
Sporting Director	(Indonesia) Ferry Paulus
Business Director	(Indonesia) Ivi Sumarna Suryana
Chief Development Youth	(Indonesia) Ricky Nelson
Match Organizing Committee	(Indonesia) Arief Perdana Kusuma
Club Secretary	(Indonesia) Regi Hariansyah
Media Officer	(Indonesia) Muhammad Nadhil
Photographer	(Indonesia) Khairul Imam
Videographer	(Indonesia) Yudhistira Achmad Nugroho
Ground (capacity and dimensions)	Jakarta International Stadium (80,000 / 105x68 metres); Gelora Bung Karno (77,193 / 105x68 metres)
Training Ground	Persija Training Center, Sawangan

== New contracts ==
No.	Pos	Player/Staff	Contract length	Contract end	Date	Source
8	MF	(Indonesia) Syahrian Abimanyu	1 year	8 July 2025	8 July 2024	
19	MF	(Indonesia) Hanif Abdurrauf Sjahbandi	1 year	11 July 2025	11 July 2024	

== Transfers ==
=== In ===
==== First round ====
No.	Pos	Name	Transferred From	Fee	Date	Source
57	AMF	(Indonesia) Ginanjar Wahyu Ramadhani	(Indonesia) Arema F.C.	End of Loan	1 July 2024	
58	LWF	(Indonesia) Frengky Deaner Missa	(Indonesia) Persikabo 1973	End of Loan	1 July 2024	
94	CMF	(Indonesia) Achmad Maulana Syarif	(Indonesia) Arema F.C.	End of Loan	1 June 2024	
78	LWF	(Indonesia) Witan Sulaeman	Bhayangkara Presisi Indonesia F.C.	End of Loan	1 July 2024	
21	LWF	(Indonesia) Alfriyanto Nico Saputro	(Indonesia) PSIM Yogyakarta	End of Loan	1 June 2024	
	CB	(Indonesia) Dia Syayid	(Indonesia) Sriwijaya F.C.	End of Loan	1 July 2024	
	CMF	(Indonesia) Resa Aditya	(Indonesia) Sriwijaya F.C.	End of Loan	1 July 2024	
	CB	(Indonesia) Fava Sheva	(Indonesia) PSPS Pekanbaru	End of Loan	1 July 2024	
	RWB	(Indonesia) Alwi Fadilah	(Indonesia) Bekasi City	End of Loan	1 July 2024	
	LW	(Indonesia) Raka Cahyana	(Indonesia) Deltras Sidoarjo	End of Loan	1 July 2024	
	RWB	(Indonesia) Ammar Fadzillah	(Indonesia) Deltras Sidoarjo	End of Loan	1 July 2024	
	AMF	(Indonesia) Syahwal Ginting	(Indonesia) Sada Sumut F.C.	End of Loan	1 July 2024	
70	CF	(Brazil) Gustavo Almeida dos Santos	(Indonesia) Arema F.C.	Free	1 July 2024	
6	MF	(Spain) Ramón Bueno Gonzalbo	(Spain) SD Tarazona	Free	16 July 2024	
74	DF	(Brazil) Pedro Henrique Dias de Amorim	Free Agent	Free	5 August 2024	
1	GK	(Brazil) Carlos Eduardo Soares Mota	(Brazil) ABC Futebol Clube	Free	10 August 2024	

==== Second round ====
No.	Pos	Player	Transferred From	Fee	Date	Source
55	LB	(Brazil) Pablo Andrade Plaza da Silva	Free Agent	Free	6 January 2025	
	DF	(Indonesia) Refan Nadief	Persiku Kudus	End of loan	1 January 2025	
	MF	(Indonesia) Resa Aditya	Persiku Kudus	End of loan	1 January 2025	
74	MF	(Indonesia) Meshal Hamzah	PSBS Biak	End of loan	1 January 2025	

=== Out ===
==== First round ====
No.	Pos	Player	Transferred To	Fee	Date	Source
94	CMF	(Indonesia) Achmad Maulana Syarif	(Indonesia) Arema F.C.	Released	1 June 2024	
58	AMF	(Indonesia) Ginanjar Wahyu Ramadhani	(Indonesia) Bhayangkara F.C.	Released	1 June 2024	
56	CB	(Indonesia) Maman Abdurrahman	(Indonesia) PSPS Pekanbaru	End of Contract	1 June 2024	
6	DMF	(Indonesia) Tony Sucipto	(Indonesia) Persela Lamongan	End of Contract	1 June 2024	
58	CMF	(Indonesia) Frengky Deaner Missa	(Indonesia) Bhayangkara F.C.	Released	10 July 2024	
50	GK	(Indonesia) Cahya Supriadi	(Indonesia) F.C. Bekasi City	Released	13 August 2024	
99	CF	(Indonesia) Aji Kusuma	(Indonesia) Persita Tangerang	Released	13 August 2024	

==== Second round ====
No.	Pos	Player	Transferred To	Fee	Date	Source
74	DF	(Brazil) Pedro Henrique Dias de Amorim	Free Agent	Free	6 January 2025	

=== Loan In ===
==== First Round ====
No.	Pos	Player	Loaned From	Start	End	Source

==== Second Round ====
No.	Pos	Player	Loaned From	Start	End	Source
69	FW	(Indonesia) Yandi Sofyan Munawar	(Indonesia) Malut United F.C.	7 January 2025	30 June 2025	

=== Loan Out ===
==== First round ====
No.	Pos	Name	Loaned to	Start	End	Source
73	FW	(Indonesia) Sandi Arta Samosir	(Indonesia) Madura United F.C.	10 July 2024	10 July 2025	
90	FW	(Indonesia) Fava Sheva	(Indonesia) PSPS Pekanbaru	29 July 2024	10 July 2025	
21	FW	(Indonesia) Alfriyanto Nico Saputro	(Indonesia) Dewa United	9 August 2024	30 June 2025	
	DF	(Indonesia) Meshaal Hamzah	(Indonesia) PSBS Biak	12 August 2024	30 June 2025	
	DF	(Indonesia) Rayhan Utina	(Indonesia) Persela Lamongan	12 August 2024	30 June 2025	
	DF	(Indonesia) Ihsan Kusuma	(Indonesia) Persela Lamongan	12 August 2024	30 June 2025	
	MF	(Indonesia) Resa Aditya	(Indonesia) Persiku Kudus	12 August 2024	30 June 2025	
	FW	(Indonesia) Jehan Pahlevi	(Indonesia) Persiku Kudus	12 August 2024	30 June 2025	
	FW	(Indonesia) Refan Nadhif	(Indonesia) Persiku Kudus	12 August 2024	30 June 2025	
	DF	(Indonesia) Farhan Sopiulloh	(Indonesia) Persiku Kudus	12 August 2024	30 June 2025	
	MF	(Indonesia) Ammar Fadzilla	(Indonesia) Deltras Sidoarjo	12 August 2024	30 June 2025	
	FW	(Indonesia) Fajar Firdaus	(Indonesia) Dejan FC	12 August 2024	30 June 2025	
	FW	(Indonesia) Nabil Asyura	(Indonesia) Dejan FC	12 August 2024	30 June 2025	
	FW	(Indonesia) Ibnu Yazid	(Indonesia) Persipal Palu	12 August 2024	30 June 2025	
	FW	(Indonesia) Arlyansyah Abdulmanan	(Indonesia) PSIM Yogyakarta	12 August 2024	30 June 2025	
	MF	(Indonesia) Figo Dennis	(Indonesia) PSIM Yogyakarta	12 August 2024	30 June 2025	
	DF	(Indonesia) Amirul Fisabilillah	(Indonesia) Deltras Sidoarjo	12 August 2024	30 June 2025	

==== Second round ====
No.	Pos	Name	Loaned to	Start	End	Source
25	RW	(Indonesia) Riko Simanjuntak	(Indonesia) PSS Sleman	9 January 2025	30 June 2025	
27	DF	(Indonesia) Dia Syayid	(Indonesia) PSS Sleman	17 January 2025	30 June 2025	
28	LB	(Indonesia) Alwi Fadilah	(Indonesia) Bekasi City	17 January 2025	30 June 2025	
80	GK	(Indonesia) Adre Arido	(Indonesia) Persikota	17 January 2025	30 June 2025	
	DF	(Indonesia) Resa Aditya	(Indonesia) Persikota	17 January 2025	30 June 2025	
	DF	(Indonesia) Meshaal Hamzah	(Indonesia) Nakhon Pathom United	1 January 2025	30 June 2025	
25	RW	(Indonesia) Risky Padilah	(Indonesia) Bekasi City	9 January 2025	30 June 2025	
25	RW	(Indonesia) Aditya Rangga	(Indonesia) PSMP	9 January 2025	30 June 2025	
25	RW	(Indonesia) Qaqa Basham	(Indonesia) Persikab Bandung	9 January 2025	30 June 2025	
25	RW	(Indonesia) Baihaqi Rifai	(Indonesia) Persikab Bandung	9 January 2025	30 June 2025	
25	RW	(Indonesia) Hibatillah Husen	(Indonesia) Persipu F.C.	9 January 2025	30 June 2025	

== Squad information ==
=== First team squad ===
No.	Name	Nat.	Date of Birth (Age)	Signed in	Contract until	Signed from	Transfer Fee	Notes
Goalkeepers
1	Carlos Eduardo Soares Mota	(Brazil)	24 February 1992 (age 34)	2024	11 August 2025	(Brazil) ABC Futebol Clube	TBA	Foreign Player
22	Muhamad Hafizh Rizkianur	(Indonesia)	8 August 2006 (age 20)	2024		(Indonesia) Persija Jakarta U-21	Free	Under-23 Player; Originally from Youth system
26	Andritany Ardhiyasa	(Indonesia)	26 December 1991 (age 34)	2010	30 June 2026	(Indonesia) Sriwijaya		Vice Captain
Defenders
2	Ilham Rio Fahmi	(Indonesia)	6 October 2001 (age 25)	2021	30 June 2025	(Indonesia) Persija Jakarta U-21	Free	Under-23 player Originally from Youth system
5	Rizky Ridho Ramadhani	(Indonesia)	21 November 2001 (age 24)	2023	30 June 2026	(Indonesia) Persebaya Surabaya	Free	Captain
11	Firza Andika	(Indonesia)	11 May 1999 (age 27)	2022	30 June 2025	(Indonesia) Persikabo 1973	Free	
17	Ondřej Kúdela	(Czech Republic)	26 March 1987 (age 39)	2022	30 June 2025	(Czech Republic) SK Slavia Prague	Free	Foreign Player
23	Hansamu Yama Pranata	(Indonesia)	16 January 1995 (age 31)	2022	31 May 2025	(Indonesia) Bhayangkara Solo F.C.	Free	
33	Muhammad Akbar Arjunsyah	(Indonesia)	21 July 2001 (age 25)	2023	30 June 2025	(Indonesia) Gresik United F.C.	Free	Under-23 Player
41	Muhammad Ferarri	(Indonesia)	21 June 2003 (age 23)	2021	30 June 2025	(Indonesia) Persija Jakarta U-21	Free	Under-23 player Originally from Youth system Vice Captain
55	Pablo Andrade Plaza da Silva	(Brazil)	15 February 1994 (age 32)	2025	TBA	Free Agent	Free	Foreign Player
Midfielders
6	Ramón Bueno Gonzalbo	(Spain)	7 February 1995 (age 31)	2024		(Spain) SD Tarazona	Free	Foreign Player
7	Ryo Matsumura	(Japan)	15 June 1994 (age 32)	2023	31 May 2026	(Thailand) BG Pathum United F.C.		Foreign Player
8	Syahrian Abimanyu	(Indonesia)	25 April 1999 (age 27)	2022	8 July 2025	(Malaysia) Johor Darul Ta'zim F.C.	Free	
10	Maciej Jacek Gajos	(Poland)	19 March 1991 (age 35)	2023	30 June 2025	(Poland) Lechia Gdańsk	TBA	Foreign Player
15	Raka Cahyana Rizky	(Indonesia)	24 February 2004 (age 22)	2021		(Indonesia) Deltras Sidoarjo	End of loan 2024	Under-23 player Originally from Youth system
19	Hanif Abdurrauf Sjahbandi	(Indonesia)	7 April 1997 (age 29)	2022	11 July 2025	(Indonesia) Arema F.C.	Free	
24	Resky Fandi Witriawan	(Indonesia)	6 September 1999 (age 27)	2022	30 June 2025	(Indonesia) PSIS Semarang	End of loan 2022	Originally from Youth system
36	Aditya Warman	(Indonesia)	6 March 2004 (age 22)	2021		(Indonesia) Sriwijaya F.C.	Free	Under-23 player Originally from Youth system
58	Muhammad Rayhan Hannan	(Indonesia)	2 April 2004 (age 22)	2023		(Indonesia) Persija Jakarta U-21	Free	Under-23 Player; Originally from Youth system
77	Dony Tri Pamungkas	(Indonesia)	11 January 2005 (age 21)	2021	30 June 2025	(Indonesia) Persija Jakarta U-21	Free	Under-23 Player; Originally from Youth system
78	Witan Sulaeman	(Indonesia)	8 October 2001 (age 25)	2023		(Indonesia) Bhayangkara F.C.	End of loan 2024	
Forwards
9	Marko Šimić	(Croatia)	23 January 1989 (age 37)	2023	30 June 2025	Free Agent		Foreign Player
66	Muhamad Zahaby Gholy	(Indonesia)	5 December 2008 (age 17)	2024		(Indonesia) Persija Jakarta U-21	Free	Under-23 Player; Originally from Youth system
70	Gustavo Almeida dos Santos	(Brazil)	25 July 1996 (age 30)	2023	30 June 2024	(Indonesia) Arema F.C.	On Loan	Foreign Player
90	Agi Firmansyah	(Indonesia)	22 July 2005 (age 21)	2024		(Indonesia) Persija Jakarta U-21	Promoted	Under-23 Player; Originally from Youth system
69	Yandi Sofyan Munawar	(Indonesia)	25 May 1992 (age 34)	2025	30 June 2025	(Indonesia) Malut United F.C.	On Loan	Looan Player

== Pre-season ==
Win Draw Loss

=== Friendly Matches ===
13 July 2024 Friendly	Persija Jakarta	0–2	Bhayangkara Presisi Indonesia F.C.	Central Jakarta, Jakarta
19.00 (UTC+7)		Report		Stadium: Gelora Bung Karno Madya Stadium; Attendance: 0

5 September 2024 Friendly	Persija Jakarta	6–1	Perserang Serang	North Jakarta, Jakarta
15.30 (UTC+7)		Report		Stadium: Jakarta International Stadium Training Field; Attendance: 0

10 October 2024 Friendly	Persija Jakarta	1–1	Dewa United F.C.	Depok, West Java
15.30 (UTC+7)		Report		Stadium: Persija Training Ground

=== 2024 Indonesia President's Cup ===
==== Group stage ====
Pos	Team	Pld	W	D	L	GF	GA	GD	Pts	Qualification
1	Arema F.C.	3	2	1	0	8	2	+6	7	Knockout stage
2	Persija Jakarta	3	1	1	1	4	6	−2	4	Knockout stage
3	Madura United F.C.	3	1	0	2	4	9	−5	3	
4	Bali United F.C. (H)	3	1	0	2	5	4	+1	3	

Source: Piala Presiden
Rules for classification: 1) Points; 2) Head-to-head points; 3) Head-to-head goal difference; 4) Head-to-head goals scored; 5) Goal difference; 6) Goals scored; 7) Fair-play points; 8) Draw.
(H) Hosts

21 July 2024 2024 Indonesia President's Cup Group B	Madura United F.C.	1–2	Persija Jakarta	Gianyar, Bali
20:30 (UTC+8)	Haudi 9'	(Report LIB) (Report MS)	Riko 42'; Gustavo 67'	Stadium: Kapten I Wayan Dipta Stadium; Attendance: 640; Referee: Tomi Manggopa (Bolaang Mongondow)

24 July 2024 2024 Indonesia President's Cup Group B	Persija Jakarta	2–2	Arema F.C.	Gianyar, Bali
20:30 (UTC+8)	Gustavo 84'; Hanif 87'	(Report LIB) (Report MS)	Tuharea 54'; Lokolingoy 67'	Stadium: Kapten I Wayan Dipta Stadium; Attendance: 993; Referee: Yudi Nurcahya (Bandung)

26 July 2024 2024 Indonesia President's Cup Group B	Bali United F.C.	3–0	Persija Jakarta	Gianyar, Bali
20:30 (UTC+8)	Wilson 20'; Made Tito 58'; M. Rahmat 63'	(Report LIB) (Report MS)		Stadium: Kapten I Wayan Dipta Stadium; Attendance: 4,447; Referee: Asep Yandis (Karawang)

==== Knockout phase ====
30 July 2024 Semi-finals	Borneo F.C. Samarinda	2–1	Persija Jakarta	Surakarta, Central Java
19:30 (UTC+7)	Nduwarugira 44'; Gavin 90+6'	(Report LIB) (Report MS)	Firza 15'	Stadium: Manahan Stadium; Attendance: 7,926; Referee: Tomi Manggopa (Bolaang Mongondow)

3 August 2024 Third place play-off	Persis Solo	1–0	Persija Jakarta	Surakarta, Central Java
19:30 (UTC+7)	Lima 10'	(Report LIB) (Report MS)		Stadium: Manahan Stadium; Attendance: 7,302; Referee: Yudi Nurcahya (Bandung)

== Competitions ==
=== Overview ===
Competition	Record								Started round	Final position / round	First match	Last match
Competition	G	W	D	L	GF	GA	GD	Win %	Started round	Final position / round	First match	Last match
Liga 1	34	14	9	11	47	38	+9	41.18	Matchday 1	TBC	10 August 2024	23 May 2025
Piala Indonesia	0	0	0	0	0	0	+0	—	Round 1	TBA	TBA	TBA
Total	34	14	9	11	47	38	+9	41.18				

Updated to match played 28 May 2025
Source: Competitions

=== Liga 1 ===

Persija XI BRI Liga 1 2024–25

==== League table ====
Pos	Team	Pld	W	D	L	GF	GA	GD	Pts
5	Borneo Samarinda	34	16	8	10	50	38	+12	56 (Note: Ranked on head-to-head points: Persebaya 4, Borneo Samarinda 1.)
6	PSM	34	13	14	7	47	34	+13	53
7	Persija	34	14	9	11	47	38	+9	51
8	Bali United	34	14	8	12	50	41	+9	50
9	PSBS	34	13	9	12	44	47	−3	48

Source: Liga 1 2024–25
Rules for classification: 1) Points; 2) Head-to-head points; 3) Head-to-head goal difference; 4) Head-to-head goals scored; 5) Goal difference; 6) Goals scored; 7) Fair-play points; 8) Drawing of lots.

==== Results summary ====
Overall								Home						Away					
Pld	W	D	L	GF	GA	GD	Pts	W	D	L	GF	GA	GD	W	D	L	GF	GA	GD
34	14	9	11	47	38	+9	51	8	7	2	29	15	+14	6	2	9	18	23	−5

Last updated: 28 May 2025.
Source: Competitive matches

==== Results by matchday ====
Matchday	1	2	3	4	5	6	7	8	9	10	11	12	13	14	15	16	17	18	19	20	21	22	23	24	25	26	27	28	29	30	31	32	33	34
Ground	H	A	H	A	H	A	H	A	A	H	A	H	A	H	A	H	A	A	H	A	H	A	H	A	H	H	A	H	A	H	A	H	A	H
Result	W	D	W	L	D	L	D	W	W	W	L	W	W	D	L	W	W	W	W	D	D	L	D	L	W	L	L	D	W	L	L	W	L	D
Position	2	5	3	4	5	8	8	7	6	5	6	5	3	3	4	3	3	3	3	2	2	3	4	4	4	4	4	5	4	5	7	6	7	7

Updated to match(es) played on 28 May 2025. Source: Matches
A = Away; H = Home; W = Win; D = Draw; L = Loss; P = Postponed

==== Score overview ====
Win Draw Loss

Opposition	Home score	Away score	Aggregate score	Double
Arema F.C.	1–3	2–1	3–4	No
Bali United F.C.	3–0	1–3	4–3	No
Borneo F.C. Samarinda	1–1	0–1	1–2	No
Dewa United F.C.	0–0	1–2	1–2	No
Madura United F.C.	4–1	0–1	4–2	No
Malut United F.C.	0–0	1–0	1–0	No
Persebaya Surabaya	1–1	1–2	2–3	No
Persib Bandung	2–2	0–2	2–4	No
Persik Kediri	2–0	1–0	3–0	Yes
Persis Solo	2–1	3–3	5–4	No
Persita Tangerang	2–0	0–0	2–0	No
PS Barito Putera	3–0	3–2	6–2	Yes
PSBS Biak	2–2	1–3	3–5	No
PSIS Semarang	2–0	2–0	4–0	Yes
PSM Makassar	1–1	0–1	1–2	No
PSS Sleman	3–1	1–2	4–3	No
Semen Padang F.C.	0–2	1–0	1–2	No

==== Matches ====
Win Draw Loss

===== First round =====
10 August 2024 1	Persija Jakarta	3–0	PS Barito Putera	North Jakarta, Jakarta
19:00 UTC+7	Gustavo 11', 71' (pen.), 81'	Report (LIB); Report (LIBMS)		Stadium: Jakarta International Stadium; Attendance: 15,971; Referee: Asep Yandis (Karawang)

18 August 2024 2	Persita Tangerang	0–0	Persija Jakarta	Bantul, Special Region of Yogyakarta
19:00 UTC+7		Report (LIB); Report (LIBMS)		Stadium: Sultan Agung Stadium; Attendance: 0 Referee: Naufal Adya Fairuski (Bandung)

24 August 2024 3	Persija Jakarta	2–1	Persis Solo	North Jakarta, Jakarta
19:00 UTC+7	Ryo 62', 74'	Report (LIB); Report (LIBMS)	Sidibé 56' (pen.)	Stadium: Jakarta International Stadium; Attendance: 25,057; Referee: Steven Yubel Poli (Manado)

12 September 2024 4	PSBS Biak	3–1	Persija Jakarta	Gianyar, Bali
20:00 UTC+8	Velázquez 33', 72'; Abimanyu 89' (o.g.)	Report (LIB); Report (LIBMS)	Hanif 45+2'	Stadium: Kapten I Wayan Dipta Stadium; Attendance: 603; Referee: Irfan Wahyu Wijanarko (Kulon Progo)

16 September 2024 5	Persija Jakarta	0–0	Dewa United	Central Jakarta, Jakarta
19:00 UTC+7		Report (LIB); Report (LIBMS)		Stadium: Gelora Bung Karno Main Stadium; Attendance: 17,345; Referee: Candra (Padang)

23 September 2024 6	Persib Bandung	2–0	Persija Jakarta	Soreang, West Java
15:30 UTC+7	Dimas 38'; Ryan 83'	Report (LIB); Report (LIBMS)		Stadium: Si Jalak Harupat Stadium; Attendance: 16,078; Referee: Muhammad Nazmi Bin Nasaruddin (Penang, Malaysia)

28 September 2024 7	Persija Jakarta	1–1	PSM Makassar	Jetis, Bantul Regency, Special Region of Yogyakarta
19:00 UTC+7	Gajos 79'	Report (LIB); Report (LIBMS)	Dethan 8'	Stadium: Sultan Agung Stadium; Attendance: 0 Referee: Steven Yubel Poli (Manado)

17 October 2024 8	PSIS Semarang	0–2	Persija Jakarta	Magelang, Central Java
19:00 UTC+7		Report (LIB); Report (LIBMS)	Gajos 24'; Rayhan 88'	Stadium: Moch. Soebroto Stadium; Attendance: 2,653; Referee: M. Erfan Effendi (Surabaya)

26 October 2024 9	Arema F.C.	1–2	Persija Jakarta	Blitar, East Java
19:00 UTC+7	Dalberto 42'	Report (LIB); Report (LIBMS)	Šimić 24'; Hanif 55'	Stadium: Gelora Supriyadi Stadium; Attendance: 2,402; Referee: Asep Yandis (Karawang)

6 November 2024 10	Persija Jakarta	4–1	Madura United F.C.	Cibinong, Bogor Regency, West Java
19:00 UTC+7	Gustavo 20'; Šimić 43' (pen.); Ryo 71'; Pedro 90+6'	Report (LIB); Report (LIBMS)	Lulinha 40' (pen.)	Stadium: Pakansari Stadium; Attendance: 9,418; Referee: Eko Saputra (Padang)

26 November 2024 11	Persebaya Surabaya	2–1	Persija Jakarta	Surabaya, East Java
15:30 UTC+7	Flávio 67'; M. Rashid 72'	Report (LIB); Report (LIBMS)	Gustavo 43' (pen.)	Stadium: Gelora Bung Tomo Stadium; Attendance: 27,190; Referee: Muhammad Tri Santoso (Yogyakarta)

1 December 2024 12	Persija Jakarta	2–0	Persik Kediri	Cibinong, Bogor Regency, West Java
15:30 UTC+7	Gustavo 9'; Šimić 13'	Report (LIB); Report (LIBMS)		Stadium: Pakansari Stadium; Attendance: 17,154; Referee: Nendi Rohaendi (Bandung)

6 December 2024 13	Semen Padang F.C.	0–1	Persija Jakarta	Padang, West Sumatera
19:00 UTC+7		Report (LIB); Report (LIBMS)	Ryo 67'	Stadium: Gelora Haji Agus Salim Stadium; Attendance: 9,000; Referee: Fibay Rahmatullah (Tangerang)

10 December 2024 14	Persija Jakarta	1–1	Borneo F.C. Samarinda	Cibinong, Bogor Regency, West Java
19:00 UTC+7	Gustavo 86'	Report (LIB); Report (LIBMS)	Habibi 90+9'	Stadium: Pakansari Stadium; Attendance: 6,723; Referee: Yudi Nurcahya (Bandung)

15 December 2024 15	Bali United F.C.	3–1	Persija Jakarta	Gianyar, Bali
20:00 UTC+8	Everton 26'; Rahmat A. 45'; M. Rahmat 70'	Report (LIB); Report (LIBMS)	Gustavo 18'	Stadium: Kapten I Wayan Dipta Stadium; Attendance: 4,922; Referee: Tommi Manggopa (Bolaang Mongondow)

21 December 2024 16	Persija Jakarta	3–1	PSS Sleman	North Jakarta, Jakarta
19:00 UTC+7	Gustavo 64', 88' (pen.), 90+12'	Report (LIB); Report (LIBMS)	G. Toncantins 14'	Stadium: Jakarta International Stadium; Attendance: 27,522; Referee: M. Erfan Effendi (Surabaya)

28 December 2024 17	Malut United F.C.	0–1	Persija Jakarta	Ternate, North Maluku
17:30 UTC+9		Report (LIB); Report (LIBMS)	Gajos 24'	Stadium: Gelora Kie Raha Stadium; Attendance: 8,214; Referee: Nendi Rohaendi (Bandung)

===== Second round =====
10 January 2025 18	PS Barito Putera	2–3	Persija Jakarta	Jetis, Bantul Regency, Special Region of Yogyakarta
15:30 UTC+7	Eksel Jr. 19'; M. Mier 46'	Report (LIB); Report (LIBMS)	Renan 2' (o.g.); Šimić 44'; Rayhan 68'	Stadium: Sultan Agung Stadium; Attendance: 0 Referee: Rio Permana Putra (Pekanbaru)

19 January 2025 19	Persija Jakarta	2–0	Persita Tangerang	North Jakarta, Jakarta
19:00 UTC+7	Šimić 45+1'; Rayhan 69'	Report (LIB); Report (LIBMS)		Stadium: Jakarta International Stadium; Attendance: 28,027; Referee: Ko Hyung-jin (South Korea)

26 January 2025 20	Persis Solo	3–3	Persija Jakarta	Surakarta, Central Java
19:00 UTC+7	F. Alesandro 6'; Lautaro B. 52', 73'	Report (LIB); Report (LIBMS)	Ryo 24', 66'; Gustavo 59'	Stadium: Manahan Stadium; Attendance: 13,493; Referee: Totok Fitrianto (Manado)

2 February 2025 21	Persija Jakarta	2–2	PSBS Biak	Bekasi, West Java
19:00 UTC+7	Gustavo 20'; Rayhan 68'	Report (LIB); Report (LIBMS)	Julián 25'; Takuya 60'	Stadium: Patriot Chandrabhaga Stadium; Attendance: 19,052; Referee: Candra (Padang)

8 February 2025 22	Dewa United F.C.	2–1	Persija Jakarta	Cibinong, Bogor Regency, West Java
19:00 UTC+7	Alex 75' (pen.), 90+8' (pen.)	Report (LIB); Report (LIBMS)	Gustavo 79'	Stadium: Pakansari Stadium; Attendance: 0 Referee: M. Erfan Effendi, S.Pd. (Surabaya)

16 February 2025 23	Persija Jakarta	2–2	Persib Bandung	Bekasi, West Java
15:30 UTC+7	Gustavo 33'; Firza 39'	Report (LIB); Report (LIBMS)	Kuipers 52'; David 70'	Stadium: Patriot Chandrabhaga Stadium; Attendance: 27,760; Referee: Muhammad Tri Santoso (Yogyakarta)

23 February 2025 24	PSM Makassar	1–0	Persija Jakarta	Gianyar, Bali
16:30 UTC+8	Haljeta 60'	Report (LIB); Report (LIBMS)		Stadium: Kapten I Wayan Dipta Stadium; Attendance: 0 Referee: Yudi Nurcahya (Bandung)

5 March 2025 25	Persija Jakarta	2–0	PSIS Semarang	Kelapa Dua, Tangerang Regency, Banten
20:30 UTC+7	Ryo 70'; Gustavo 90+7'	Report (LIB); Report (LIBMS)		Stadium: Indomilk Arena; Attendance: 0 Referee: Naufal Adya Fairuski (Bandung)
Note: Persija Jakarta hosting PSIS Semarang which was originally scheduled for 4 March 2025 at Patriot Chandrabhaga Stadium was canceled due to the stadium's vital facilities being submerged in water due to flooding at Patriot Candrabhaga Stadium, namely the electricity substation, stadium generator room, players' changing rooms, host broadcaster room, and several other important rooms. The match was moved to Indomilk Arena on 5 March 2025.

9 March 2025 26	Persija Jakarta	1–3	Arema F.C.	Bekasi, West Java
20:30 UTC+7	R. Ridho 62'	Report (LIB); Report (LIBMS)	Gildson 65'; Dalberto 67'; Ferarri 73' (o.g.)	Stadium: Patriot Chandrabhaga Stadium; Attendance: 0 Referee: Steven Yubel Poli (Manado)

6 April 2025 27	Madura United F.C.	1–0	Persija Jakarta	Bangkalan, East Java
19:00 UTC+7	Škrbić 42' (pen.)	Report (LIB); Report (LIBMS)		Stadium: Gelora Bangkalan Stadium; Attendance: 4,174; Referee: Tomi Manggopa (Bolaang Mongondow)
Note: Madura United F.C. hosting Persija Jakarta which was originally scheduled for 13 March 2025 at Gelora Bangkalan Stadium was rescheduked due to Madura United F.C. participation on 2nd Leg Quarterfinals 2024-25 AFC Challenge League against Tainan City F.C. at 13 March 2025.

12 April 2025 28	Persija Jakarta	1–1	Persebaya Surabaya	Central Jakarta, Jakarta
19:00 UTC+7	Rayhan 62'	Report (LIB); Report (LIBMS)	Flávio 65'	Stadium: Gelora Bung Karno Main Stadium; Attendance: 39,395; Referee: Asep Yandis (Karawang)

19 April 2025 29	Persik Kediri	0–1	Persija Jakarta	Blitar, East Java
19:00 UTC+7		Report (LIB); Report (LIBMS)	Kúdela 3' (pen.)	Stadium: Gelora Supriyadi Stadium; Attendance: 1,527; Referee: Armyn Dwi Suryathin (Lubuklinggau)

27 April 2025 30	Persija Jakarta	0–2	Semen Padang F.C.	Cibinong, Bogor Regency, West Java
19:00 UTC+7		Report (LIB); Report (LIBMS)	Firman 19'; Bruno 44'	Stadium: Pakansari Stadium; Attendance: 9,072; Referee: Rio Permana Putra (Pekanbaru)

4 May 2025 31	Borneo F.C. Samarinda	1–0	Persija Jakarta	Samarinda, East Kalimantan
20:00 UTC+8	Sihran 25'	Report (LIB); Report (LIBMS)		Stadium: Segiri Stadium; Attendance: 8,388; Referee: Yudi Nurcahya (Bandung)

10 May 2025 32	Persija Jakarta	3–0	Bali United F.C.	North Jakarta, Jakarta
19:00 UTC+7	Gustavo 8', 73'; Witan 53'	Report (LIB); Report (LIBMS)		Stadium: Jakarta International Stadium; Attendance: 7,889; Referee: Muhammad Tri Santoso (Yogyakarta)

17 May 2025 33	PSS Sleman	2–1	Persija Jakarta	Depok, Sleman Regency, Special Region of Yogyakarta
19:00 UTC+7	G. Tocantins 22' (penn.); Cirino 90+12'	Report (LIB); Report (LIBMS)	Andrade 25'	Stadium: Maguwoharjo Stadium; Attendance: 14,300; Referee: Agung Setiyawan (Lamongan)

23 May 2025 34	Persija Jakarta	0–0	Malut United F.C.	North Jakarta, Jakarta
19:00 UTC+7		Report (LIB); Report (LIBMS)		Stadium: Jakarta International Stadium; Attendance: 11,646; Referee: Yudi Nurcahya (Bandung)

== Statistics ==
=== Squad appearances and goals ===
Last updated on 28 May 2025

No.	Pos	Nat	Player	Total		Liga 1		Piala Indonesia	
No.	Pos	Nat	Player	Apps	Goals	Apps	Goals	Apps	Goals
Goalkeepers
1	GK	(Brazil) BRA	Carlos Eduardo Soares Mota	18	0	18	0	0	0
22	GK	(Indonesia) IDN	Muhamad Hafizh Rizkianur	0	0	0	0	0	0
26	GK	(Indonesia) IDN	Andritany Ardhiyasa	19	0	16+3	0	0	0
80	GK	(Indonesia) IDN	Adre Arido Geovani	0	0	0	0	0	0
Defenders
2	DF	(Indonesia) IDN	Ilham Rio Fahmi	28	0	22+6	0	0	0
5	DF	(Indonesia) IDN	Rizky Ridho Ramadhani	32	1	29+3	1	0	0
11	DF	(Indonesia) IDN	Firza Andika	27	1	23+4	1	0	0
15	DF	(Indonesia) IDN	Raka Cahyana Rizky	10	0	3+7	0	0	0
17	DF	(Czech Republic) CZE	Ondřej Kúdela	24	1	24	1	0	0
23	DF	(Indonesia) IDN	Hansamu Yama Pranata	19	0	15+4	0	0	0
27	DF	(Indonesia) IDN	Dia Syayid Alhawari	0	0	0	0	0	0
28	DF	(Indonesia) IDN	Muhamad Alwi Fadillah	2	0	0+2	0	0	0
33	DF	(Indonesia) IDN	Muhammad Akbar Arjunsyah	4	0	1+3	0	0	0
41	DF	(Indonesia) IDN	Muhammad Ferarri	23	0	19+4	0	0	0
55	DF	(Brazil) BRA	Pablo Andrade Plaza da Silva	15	1	8+7	1	0	0
Midfielders
6	MF	(Spain) ESP	Ramón Bueno Gonzalbo	28	0	24+4	0	0	0
7	MF	(Japan) JPN	Ryo Matsumura	34	7	30+4	7	0	0
8	MF	(Indonesia) IDN	Syahrian Abimanyu	21	0	5+16	0	0	0
10	MF	(Poland) POL	Maciej Jacek Gajos	32	3	30+2	3	0	0
19	MF	(Indonesia) IDN	Hanif Abdurrauf Sjahbandi	33	2	19+14	2	0	0
24	MF	(Indonesia) IDN	Resky Fandi Witriawan	10	0	3+7	0	0	0
36	DF	(Indonesia) IDN	Aditya Warman	4	0	0+4	0	0	0
58	DF	(Indonesia) IDN	Muhammad Rayhan Hannan	26	5	9+17	5	0	0
77	MF	(Indonesia) IDN	Dony Tri Pamungkas	14	0	10+4	0	0	0
78	MF	(Indonesia) IDN	Witan Sulaeman	28	1	12+16	1	0	0
Forwards
9	FW	(Croatia) CRO	Marko Šimić	24	5	17+7	5	0	0
70	MF	(Brazil) BRA	Gustavo Almeida dos Santos	28	18	27+1	18	0	0
66	FW	(Indonesia) IDN	Zahaby Gholy	2	0	0+2	0	0	0
69	FW	(Indonesia) IDN	Yandi Sofyan Munawar	8	0	1+7	0	0	0
90	FW	(Indonesia) IDN	Agi Firmansyah	0	0	0	0	0	0
Players who have made an appearance or had a squad number this season but have left the club
25	MF	(Indonesia) IDN	Riko Simanjuntak	14	0	8+6	0	0	0
74	DF	(Brazil) BRA	Pedro Henrique Dias de Amorim	4	1	1+3	1	0	0

Last updated: 28 May 2025.
Source: Soccerway

=== Top scorers ===
The list is sorted by shirt number when total goals are equal.

Rnk	Pos	No.	Player	Liga 1	Piala Indonesia	Total
1	FW	70	(Brazil) Gustavo Almeida dos Santos	18	0	18
2	MF	7	(Japan) Ryo Matsumura	7	0	7
3	FW	9	(Croatia) Marko Šimić	5	0	5
3	MF	58	(Indonesia) Muhammad Rayhan Hannan	5	0	5
4	MF	10	(Poland) Maciej Jacek Gajos	3	0	3
5	MF	19	(Indonesia) Hanif Abdurrauf Sjahbandi	2	0	2
6	DF	74	(Brazil) Pedro Henrique Dias de Amorim	1	0	1
6	DF	11	(Indonesia) Firza Andika	1	0	1
6	DF	5	(Indonesia) Rizky Ridho Ramadhani	1	0	1
6	DF	17	(Czech Republic) Ondřej Kúdela	1	0	1
6	MF	78	(Indonesia) Witan Sulaeman	1	0	1
6	DF	55	(Brazil) Pablo Andrade Plaza da Silva	1	0	1
Own goals				1	0	1
Total				47	0	47

Last updated: 28 May 2025.
Source: Soccerway

=== Top assist ===
The list is sorted by shirt number when total assists are equal.

Rnk	Pos	No.	Player	Liga 1	Piala Indonesia	Total
1	MF	7	(Japan) Ryo Matsumura	8	0	8
2	MF	10	(Poland) Maciej Jacek Gajos	5	0	5
3	MF	78	(Indonesia) Witan Sulaeman	4	0	4
4	DF	41	(Indonesia) Muhammad Ferarri	3	0	3
5	MF	25	(Indonesia) Riko Simanjuntak	2	0	2
5	CM	58	(Indonesia) Muhammad Rayhan Hannan	2	0	2
5	DF	2	(Indonesia) Ilham Rio Fahmi	2	0	2
6	DF	5	(Indonesia) Rizky Ridho Ramadhani	1	0	1
6	MF	8	(Indonesia) Syahrian Abimanyu	1	0	1
6	GK	26	(Indonesia) Andritany Ardhiyasa	1	0	1
6	LM	77	(Indonesia) Dony Tri Pamungkas	1	0	1
6	CM	6	(Indonesia) Ramón Bueno Gonzalbo	1	0	1
6	FW	9	(Croatia) Marko Šimić	1	0	1
Total				32	0	32

Last updated: 28 May 2025.

=== Clean sheets ===
The list is sorted by shirt number when total clean sheets are equal.

Rnk	No.	Player	Liga 1	Piala Indonesia	Total
1	1	(Brazil) Carlos Eduardo Soares Mota	8	0	8
2	26	(Indonesia) Andritany Ardhiyasa	6	0	6
Total			14	0	14

Last updated: 28 May 2025.
Source: Soccerway

=== Disciplinary record ===
Includes all competitive matches. Players listed below made at least one appearance for Persija Jakarta first squad during the season.

Rnk	Pos.	No.	Nat.	Name	Liga 1			Piala Indonesia			Total			Disciplinary Points	Notes
Rnk	Pos.	No.	Nat.	Name	Yellow card	Second yellow card	Red card	Yellow card	Second yellow card	Red card	Yellow card	Second yellow card	Red card	Disciplinary Points	Notes
1	FW	70	(Brazil)	Gustavo Almeida dos Santos	6	0	1	0	0	0	6	0	1	9	
2	DF	2	(Indonesia)	Ilham Rio Fahmi	5	1	0	0	0	0	5	1	0	8	
2	MF	10	(Poland)	Maciej Jacek Gajos	5	0	1	0	0	0	5	0	1	8	
3	DF	11	(Indonesia)	Firza Andika	4	1	0	0	0	0	4	1	0	7	
4	DF	17	(Czech Republic)	Ondřej Kúdela	3	0	1	0	0	0	3	0	1	6	
4	MF	19	(Indonesia)	Hanif Abdurrauf Sjahbandi	6	0	0	0	0	0	6	0	0	6	
5	DF	5	(Indonesia)	Rizky Ridho Ramadhani	5	0	0	0	0	0	5	0	0	5	
5	MF	6	(Spain)	Ramón Bueno Gonzalbo	5	0	0	0	0	0	5	0	0	5	
6	GK	1	(Brazil)	Carlos Eduardo Soares Mota	1	1	0	0	0	0	1	1	0	4	
6	DF	41	(Indonesia)	Muhammad Ferarri	1	1	0	0	0	0	1	1	0	4	
6	MF	78	(Indonesia)	Witan Sulaeman	4	0	0	0	0	0	4	0	0	4	
7	MF	8	(Indonesia)	Syahrian Abimanyu	3	0	0	0	0	0	3	0	0	3	
7	FW	9	(Croatia)	Marko Šimić	3	0	0	0	0	0	3	0	0	3	
7	MF	7	(Japan)	Ryo Matsumura	3	0	0	0	0	0	3	0	0	3	
8	MF	36	(Indonesia)	Aditya Warman	2	0	0	0	0	0	2	0	0	2	
8	MF	58	(Indonesia)	Muhammad Rayhan Hannan	2	0	0	0	0	0	2	0	0	2	
8	DF	23	(Indonesia)	Hansamu Yama Pranata	2	0	0	0	0	0	2	0	0	2	
9	MF	25	(Indonesia)	Riko Simanjuntak	1	0	0	0	0	0	1	0	0	1	
9	DF	74	(Brazil)	Pedro Henrique Dias de Amorim	1	0	0	0	0	0	1	0	0	1	
9	DF	55	(Brazil)	Pablo Andrade Plaza da Silva	1	0	0	0	0	0	1	0	0	1	
9	MF	24	(Indonesia)	Resky Fandi Witriawan	1	0	0	0	0	0	1	0	0	1	
9	DF	15	(Indonesia)	Raka Cahyana Rizky	1	0	0	0	0	0	1	0	0	1	

Last updated: 28 May 2025
Source: Competitions
Only competitive matches
(yellow card) = Number of bookings; (second yellow card) = Number of sending offs after a second yellow card; (red card) = Number of sending offs by a direct red card.

=== Summary ===
Games played	34 (34 Liga 1)
Games won	14 (14 Liga 1)
Games drawn	9 (9 Liga 1)
Games lost	11 (11 Liga 1)
Goals scored	47 (47 Liga 1)
Goals conceded	38 (38 Liga 1)
Goal difference	+9 (+9 Liga 1)
Clean sheets	14 (14 Liga 1)
Yellow cards	73 (73 Liga 1)
Red cards	7 (7 Liga 1)
Most appearances	(Japan) Ryo Matsumura (34 appearances)
Top scorer	(Brazil) Gustavo Almeida dos Santos (18 Goals)
Top assist	(Japan) Ryo Matsumura (8 Assists)
Winning Percentage	14/34 (41.18%)

Last updated: 28 May 2025.
Source: Liga 1
