= 2023–24 Persija Jakarta season =

Persija Jakarta
2023–24 season
- Owner: PT Persija Jaya Jakarta
- President: Mohamad Prapanca
- Manager: (Germany) Thomas Jens Uwe Doll
- Stadium: Jakarta International Stadium; Gelora Bung Karno Main Stadium
- Liga 1: 8th
- Top goalscorer: League: Marko Šimić (11 goals); All: Marko Šimić (11 goals)
- Highest home attendance: 55,103 vs Persebaya Surabaya, 30 July 2024, Liga 1
- Lowest home attendance: 170 vs Persik Kediri, 16 March 2024, Liga 1
- Average home league attendance: 17,360
- Biggest win: 4-0 vs Persikabo 1973 (H), 9 November 2023, Liga 1
- Biggest defeat: 1-3 vs Borneo F.C. Samarinda (A), 6 February 2024, Liga 1
Home colours	Away colours	Third colours
- All statistics correct as of 8 June 2024.

The 2023–24 season is Persija's 90th competitive season. They have not been relegated since the Perserikatan competition started in 1933. This season is Persija's 29th consecutive seasons in top-flight since professional competition formed on 1994. The season covers the period from 1 June 2023 to 31 May 2024. This season Persija passes club license for AFC Champions League and AFC Cup for season 2023–24. PSSI through the Club Licensing Committee meeting held in Jakarta, Wednesday 17 May 2023 decided several things regarding the 2022/2023 licensing season. The first decision was to regulate the AFC Champions League stating that Persija meet the conditions set out in the PSSI Club Licensing Regulation with Granted with Sanction status. Later, the second decision was to regulate the AFC Cup and Liga 1 stated that Persija meet the conditions that have been set in PSSI Club Licensing Regulation.

== Coaching staff ==
Position	Staff
Manager & Head Coach	(Germany) Thomas Jens Uwe Doll
Assistant Manager	(Indonesia) Vava Hernandia
Assistant Coach	(Italy) Pasquale Domenico Rocco (Indonesia) Sopian Hadi
Goalkeeper Coach	(Czech Republic) Jan Klima
Fitness Coach	(Cyprus) Paul Keenan (Indonesia) Ilham Ralibi, S.Pd.
Individual Development Coach	(Indonesia) Ferdiansyah
Video Analyst	(Indonesia) Uzzy Assidra Muhammad
Statistician	(Indonesia) Dani Budi Rayoga
Opposition/Player Scouting	(Indonesia) Petrick Sinuraya
Team Doctor	(Indonesia) Ikhsan Eka Putra
Nutritionist	(Indonesia) Emilia Achmadi, MS RDN
Physiotherapist	(Indonesia) Muhamad Yanizar Lubis (Indonesia) Jeremiah Halomoan S
Masseur	(Indonesia) Akhmad Aditya Subkhi (Indonesia) Sutisna
Kitman	(Indonesia) Abdul Rahman Saleh (Indonesia) Candra Darmawan

=== Management ===
Chief Executive Officer	(Indonesia) Ambono Januarianto
President	(Indonesia) Mohammad Prapanca
Vice President	(Indonesia) Ganesha Putera
Financial Director	(Indonesia) Koko Afiat
Sporting Director	(Indonesia) Ferry Paulus
Business Director	(Indonesia) Ivi Sumarna Suryana
Match Organizing Committee	(Indonesia) Arief Perdana Kusuma
Club Secretary	(Indonesia) Muhammad Araaf Sidik
Media Officer	(Indonesia) Muhammad Nadhil
Photographer	(Indonesia) Khairul Imam
Videographer	(Indonesia) Yudhistira Achmad Nugroho
Ground (capacity and dimensions)	Jakarta International Stadium (80,000 / 105x68 metres); Gelora Bung Karno (77,193 / 105x68 metres)
Training Ground	Persija Training Center, Sawangan

== New contracts ==
No.	Pos	Player/Staff	Contract length	Contract end	Date	Source
	Manager	(Germany) Thomas Jens Uwe Doll	2 Years	30 June 2025	25 March 2023	
41	DF	(Indonesia) Muhammad Ferarri	2 Years	30 June 2025	25 March 2023	
11	DF	(Indonesia) Firza Andika	2 Years	30 June 2025	25 March 2023	
24	MF	(Indonesia) Resky Fandi Witriawan	2 Years	30 June 2025	25 March 2023	
77	MF	(Indonesia) Dony Tri Pamungkas	2 Years	30 June 2025	25 March 2023	
26	GK	(Indonesia) Andritany Ardhiyasa	3 Years	30 June 2026	25 March 2023	
25	MF	(Indonesia) Riko Simanjuntak	3 Years	30 June 2026	25 March 2023	
23	DF	(Indonesia) Hansamu Yama Pranata	2 Years	31 May 2025	16 April 2023	
56	DF	(Indonesia) Maman Abdurrahman	1 Year	31 May 2024	24 May 2023	
6	DF	(Indonesia) Tony Sucipto	1 Year	31 May 2024	24 May 2023	

== Transfers ==
=== In ===
==== First round ====
No.	Pos	Player	Transferred From	Fee	Date	Source
33	CB	(Indonesia) Muhammad Akbar Arjunsyah	(Indonesia) Gresik United F.C.	Free	13 April 2023	
74	CB	(Indonesia) Rizky Ridho Ramadhani	(Indonesia) Persebaya Surabaya	Free	17 April 2023	
5	CB	(Indonesia) Otavio Dutra	(Indonesia) Madura United F.C.	End of loan	3 May 2023	
7	AMF	(Japan) Ryo Matsumura	(Thailand) BG Pathum United F.C.	Undisclosed	26 May 2023	
9	CF	(Croatia) Marko Šimić	(Serbia) FK Radnički 1923	Free	20 June 2023	
10	MF	(Poland) Maciej Jacek Gajos	(Poland) Lechia Gdańsk	Rp1.56B	14 July 2023	
22	RW	(Philippines) Oliver Saludares Bias	(Czech Republic) FK Příbram	Loan	19 July 2023	

==== Second round ====
No.	Pos	Player	Transferred From	Fee	Date	Source

=== Out ===
==== First round ====
No.	Pos	Player	Transferred To	Fee	Date	Source
28	RB	(Indonesia) Ahmad Birrul Walidain	(Indonesia) Gresik United	Released	29 April 2023	
70	LB	(Indonesia) Rahma Nicko	(Indonesia) Sada Sumut F.C.	Released	29 April 2023	
5	CB	(Indonesia) Otávio Dutra	Free Agent	End of Contract	3 May 2023	
46	LWF	(Indonesia) Osvaldo Haay	Free Agent	End of Contract	15 May 2023	
10	CMF	(Germany) Hanno Behrens	(Germany) VfB Lübeck	Mutual Consent	20 May 2023	
9	CF	(Bahrain) Abdulla Yusuf Abdulrahim Mohamed Helal	(Czech Republic) FK Mladá Boleslav	Mutual Consent	15 June 2023	
27	CF	(Czech Republic) Michael Krmenčík	(Cyprus) Apollon Limassol FC	Undisclosed	15 June 2023	

==== Second round ====
No.	Pos	Player	Transferred To	Fee	Date	Source
55	CB	(Indonesia) Dandi Maulana Abdulhak	(Indonesia) RANS Nusantara F.C.	29 November 2023	31 May 2024	
	CB	(Indonesia) Barnabas Sobor	(Indonesia) PSIS Semarang	29 November 2023	31 May 2024	

=== Loan In ===
==== Second Round ====
No.	Pos	Player	Loaned From	Start	End	Source
70	CF	(Brazil) Gustavo Almeida dos Santos	(Indonesia) Arema F.C.	9 November 2023	30 June 2024	

=== Loan Out ===
==== First round ====
No.	Pos	Name	Loaned to	Start	End	Source
	CB	(Indonesia) Barnabas Sobor	(Indonesia) Kalteng Putra	25 March 2023	31 December 2023	
57	AMF	(Indonesia) Ginanjar Wahyu Ramadhani	(Indonesia) Arema F.C.	4 June 2023	31 May 2024	
58	LWF	(Indonesia) Frengky Deaner Missa	(Indonesia) Persikabo 1973	4 June 2023	30 June 2024	
94	CMF	(Indonesia) Achmad Maulana Syarif	(Indonesia) Arema F.C.	4 June 2023	31 May 2024	
	RB	(Indonesia) Syahwal Ginting	(Indonesia) Sada Sumut F.C.	6 July 2023	30 May 2024	
	CB	(Indonesia) Dia Syayid	(Indonesia) Sriwijaya F.C.	6 July 2023	30 May 2024	
	CMF	(Indonesia) Resa Aditya	(Indonesia) Sriwijaya F.C.	6 July 2023	30 May 2024	
	RB	(Indonesia) Fava Sheva	(Indonesia) PSPS Pekanbaru	11 agustus 2023	30 May 2024	
	RWB	(Indonesia) alwi Fadilah	(Indonesia) Bekasi City F.C.	8 September 2023	30 May 2024	
45	LW	(Indonesia) Raka Cahyana	(Indonesia) Deltras Sidoarjo	9 September 2023	30 May 2024	
45	RWB	(Indonesia) Ammar Fadzillah	(Indonesia) Deltras Sidoarjo	26 Oktober 2023	30 May 2024	

==== Second round ====
No.	Pos	Name	Loaned to	Start	End	Source
78	LWF	(Indonesia) Witan Sulaeman	Bhayangkara Presisi Indonesia F.C.	10 November 2023	26 May 2024	
21	LWF	(Indonesia) Alfriyanto Nico Saputro	(Indonesia) PSIM Yogyakarta	29 November 2023	31 May 2024	

== Squad information ==
=== First team squad ===
No.	Name	Nat.	Date of Birth (Age)	Signed in	Contract until	Signed from	Transfer Fee	Notes
Goalkeepers
13	Adre Adrido Greovani	(Indonesia)	13 August 2004 (age 22)	2022		(Indonesia) Persija Jakarta U-21	Free	Under-23 Player; Originally from Youth system
26	Andritany Ardhiyasa	(Indonesia)	26 December 1991 (age 34)	2010	30 June 2026	(Indonesia) Sriwijaya		Captain
50	Cahya Supriadi	(Indonesia)	11 February 2003 (age 23)	2021		(Indonesia) Persija Jakarta U-21	Free	Under-23 Player; Originally from Youth system
Defenders
2	Ilham Rio Fahmi	(Indonesia)	6 October 2001 (age 25)	2021	30 June 2025	(Indonesia) Persija Jakarta U-21	Free	Under-23 player Originally from Youth system
6	Tony Sucipto	(Indonesia)	12 February 1986 (age 40)	2019	30 June 2024	(Indonesia) Persib Bandung		
11	Firza Andika	(Indonesia)	11 May 1999 (age 27)	2022	30 June 2025	(Indonesia) Persikabo 1973	Free	
17	Ondřej Kúdela	(Czech Republic)	26 March 1987 (age 39)	2022	30 June 2025	(Czech Republic) SK Slavia Prague	Free	Foreign Player
23	Hansamu Yama Pranata	(Indonesia)	16 January 1995 (age 31)	2022	31 May 2025	(Indonesia) Bhayangkara Solo F.C.	Free	
24	Resky Fandi Witriawan	(Indonesia)	6 September 1999 (age 27)	2022	30 June 2025	(Indonesia) PSIS Semarang	End of Loan at 2022	Originally from Youth system
33	Muhammad Akbar Arjunsyah	(Indonesia)	21 July 2001 (age 25)	2023	30 June 2025	(Indonesia) Gresik United F.C.	Free	Under-23 Player
41	Muhammad Ferarri	(Indonesia)	21 June 2003 (age 23)	2021	30 June 2025	(Indonesia) Persija Jakarta U-21	Free	Under-23 player Originally from Youth system
56	Maman Abdurrahman	(Indonesia)	12 May 1982 (age 44)	2015	30 June 2024	(Indonesia) Persita Tangerang		
57	Rafa Abdurrahman	(Indonesia)	20 August 2007 (age 19)	2023		(Indonesia) Persija Jakarta U-21	Free	Under-23 Player; Originally from Youth system
74	Rizky Ridho Ramadhani	(Indonesia)	21 November 2001 (age 24)	2023	30 June 2026	(Indonesia) Persebaya Surabaya	Free	Under-23 Player
Midfielders
7	Ryo Matsumura	(Japan)	15 June 1994 (age 32)	2023	31 May 2026	(Thailand) BG Pathum United F.C.		Foreign Player
8	Syahrian Abimanyu	(Indonesia)	25 April 1999 (age 27)	2022	30 June 2024	(Malaysia) Johor Darul Ta'zim F.C.	Free	
10	Maciej Jacek Gajos	(Poland)	19 March 1991 (age 35)	2023	30 June 2025	(Poland) Lechia Gdańsk	TBA	Foreign Player
19	Hanif Abdurrauf Sjahbandi	(Indonesia)	7 April 1997 (age 29)	2022	31 March 2024	(Indonesia) Arema F.C.	Free	
22	Oliver Saludares Bias	(Philippines)	15 June 2001 (age 25)	2023	TBA	(Philippines) Azkals Development Team	TBA	Under-23 Player
25	Riko Simanjuntak	(Indonesia)	26 January 1992 (age 34)	2018	30 June 2026	(Indonesia) Semen Padang	Free	
58	Muhammad Rayhan Hannan	(Indonesia)	2 April 2004 (age 22)	2023		(Indonesia) Persija Jakarta U-21	Free	Under-23 Player; Originally from Youth system
73	Sandi Arta Samosir	(Indonesia)	8 January 2002 (age 24)	2023		(Indonesia) Persija Jakarta U-21	Free	Under-23 player Originally from Youth system
77	Dony Tri Pamungkas	(Indonesia)	11 January 2005 (age 21)	2021	30 June 2025	(Indonesia) Persija Jakarta U-21	Free	Under-23 Player; Originally from Youth system
Forwards
9	Marko Šimić	(Croatia)	23 January 1989 (age 37)	2023	30 June 2025	Free Agent		Foreign Player
70	Gustavo Almeida dos Santos	(Brazil)	25 July 1996 (age 30)	2023	30 June 2024	(Indonesia) Arema F.C.	On Loan	Foreign Player; Loan Player
99	Aji Kusuma	(Indonesia)	30 January 1999 (age 27)	2023	2024	(Indonesia) Persiba Balikpapan	TBC	

== Pre-season ==
Win Draw Loss

=== Friendly Matches ===
10 June 2023 Friendly	Persija Jakarta	8–0	Persipu F.C.	Depok, West Java
	Witan 9', 41'; Riko 25'; Hanif 45'; Ryo 55'; Samosir 76' (pen.), 89'; Dandi 85'	Report		Stadium: Persija Training Center

14 June 2023 Friendly	Persija Jakarta	11–0	PS UMJ	Depok, West Java
15:30	Hanif 4'; Ryo 9', 22', 23'; Samosir 25'; Rayhan 48'; Ferarri 59'; Riko 60', 79'; Ammar 63'; Nico 75'	Report		Stadium: Persija Training Center

18 June 2023 Friendly	Persebaya Surabaya	2–2	Persija Jakarta	Surabaya, East Java
15.30 (UTC+7)	Kandaimu 14'; Zé 55'		Riko 29'; Aji 71'	Stadium: Gelora Bung Tomo Stadium; Referee: M. Erfan Effendi (Surabaya)

21 June 2023 Friendly	RANS Nusantara F.C.	2–1	Persija Jakarta	South Jakarta, Jakarta
18.30 (UTC+7)	Antoni 78', 90+3'		Nico 62'	Stadium: PTIK Stadium; Attendance: 0 Referee: Gideon F. Dapaherang (East Jakarta)

25 June 2023 Friendly	Persija Jakarta	1–0	(Thailand) Ratchaburi F.C.	Bekasi, West Java
19.30 (UTC+7)	Riko 58'			Stadium: Patriot Chandrabhaga Stadium; Referee: Yudi Nurcahya (Bandung)

== Mid-season ==
Win Draw Loss

=== Friendly Matches ===
21 January 2024 Friendly	Persija Jakarta	7–1	Dejan F.C.	Depok, West Java
15.30 (UTC+7)	Aji 2', 40'; Gajos 39'; Gustavo 59', 70', 87' (pen.); Ryo 71'	Report	42'	Stadium: Persija Training Center; Attendance: 0

28 January 2024 Friendly	Persita Tangerang	2–2	Persija Jakarta	Tangerang Regency, Banten
15.30 (UTC+7)	Nader 42'; Rontini 67'	Report	Gustavo 3'; Ryo 14'	Stadium: Indomilk Arena; Attendance: 0

15 February 2024 Friendly	Persija Jakarta	3–1	Persikota Tangerang	Depok, West Java
15.30 (UTC+7)	Ryo 43'; Gajos 45+1'; Hanif 71'	Report	83'	Stadium: Persija Training Center; Attendance: 0 Referee: Zetman Pangaribuan (Central Jakarta)

== Post-season ==
Win Draw Loss

=== Friendly Matches ===
25 May 2024 Friendly	Persija Jakarta	3–1	EFSA Sport Agency	Depok, West Java
08:30 (UTC+7)	Firza 23'; Irpan 28'; Nico 56'	Report	10'	Stadium: Persija Training Center; Attendance: 0

=== RCTI Premium Sports ===
30 May 2024 Semifinal	Persija Jakarta	1-0	PSIS Semarang	North Jakarta, Jakarta
19:45 UTC+7	Akbar 22'	Report		Stadium: Jakarta International Stadium; Attendance: 28,257; Referee: Thoriq Munir Alkatiri (Bandung)

2 June 2024 Final	Persija Jakarta	0-1	(Malaysia) Selangor F.C.	North Jakarta, Jakarta
19:35 UTC+7		Report	Fortes 3'	Stadium: Jakarta International Stadium; Attendance: 30,123; Referee: Asep Yandis (Karawang)

== Competitions ==
=== Overview ===
Competition	Record								Started round	Final position / round	First match	Last match
Competition	G	W	D	L	GF	GA	GD	Win %	Started round	Final position / round	First match	Last match
Liga 1	34	12	12	10	49	41	+8	35.29	Matchday 1	8th	3 July 2023	26 May 2024
Piala Indonesia	0	0	0	0	0	0	+0	—	Round 1	TBA	TBA	TBA
Total	34	12	12	10	49	41	+8	35.29				

Updated to match played 7 May 2024
Source: Competitions

=== Liga 1 ===

Persija XI BRI Liga 1 2023–24

==== League table ====
Pos	Team	Pld	W	D	L	GF	GA	GD	Pts
6	PSIS	34	15	8	11	49	41	+8	53
7	Persis	34	14	8	12	50	47	+3	50
8	Persija	34	12	12	10	49	41	+8	48 (Note: Ranked on head-to-head points: Persija 6, Persik 0.)
9	Persik	34	13	9	12	58	55	+3	48
10	Barito Putera	34	11	13	10	51	48	+3	46

Source: BRI Liga 1 2023–24
Rules for classification: 1) Points; 2) Head-to-head points; 3) Head-to-head goal difference; 4) Head-to-head goals scored; 5) Goal difference; 6) Goals scored; 7) Fair-play points; 8) Draw.

==== Results summary ====
Overall								Home						Away					
Pld	W	D	L	GF	GA	GD	Pts	W	D	L	GF	GA	GD	W	D	L	GF	GA	GD
34	12	12	10	49	41	+8	48	8	7	2	28	14	+14	4	5	8	21	27	−6

Last updated: 7 May 2024.
Source: Competitive matches

==== Results by matchday ====
Matchday	1	2	3	4	5	6	7	8	9	10	11	12	13	14	15	16	17	18	19	20	21	22	23	24	25	26	27	28	29	30	31	32	33	34
Ground	H	A	H	A	H	A	H	A	H	A	H	A	H	A	H	H	A	A	H	A	H	A	H	A	H	A	H	A	H	A	H	A	A	H
Result	D	D	W	L	W	W	D	L	D	L	D	W	D	D	D	L	L	W	W	D	D	D	W	L	L	L	W	L	W	L	W	D	W	W
Position	10	11	6	10	5	2	3	7	9	12	12	9	8	9	10	11	13	9	8	9	9	8	9	9	10	11	8	11	10	11	10	10	9	8

Updated to match(es) played on 7 May 2023. Source: Matches
A = Away; H = Home; W = Win; D = Draw; L = Loss; P = Postponed

==== Score overview ====
Win Draw Loss

Opposition	Home score	Away score	Aggregate score	Double
Arema F.C.	2–2	2-3	4-5	No
Bali United F.C.	1–1	0-1	1-2	No
Bhayangkara Presisi Indonesia F.C.	4-1	2-2	6-3	No
Borneo F.C. Samarinda	1-1	1–3	1–4	No
Dewa United F.C.	4-1	0-2	4-3	No
Madura United F.C.	0-1	0-2	0-3	No
Persebaya Surabaya	1-0	1-1	2-1	No
Persib Bandung	1-1	1-2	2-3	No
Persik Kediri	2-0	2-1	4-1	Yes
Persikabo 1973	1–1	4-0	5-1	No
Persis Solo	1-0	2–2	3-2	No
Persita Tangerang	1-1	0-1	1-2	No
PS Barito Putera	1-1	2-2	3-3	No
PSIS Semarang	2–1	1–2	3–3	No
PSM Makassar	1–1	3-2	4-3	No
PSS Sleman	1-0	3-1	4-1	Yes
RANS Nusantara F.C.	1-2	1-0	2-2	No

==== Matches ====
Win Draw Loss

===== First round =====
3 July 2023 1	Persija Jakarta	1–1	PSM Makassar	Central Jakarta, Jakarta
19:00 UTC+7	Ryo 81'	Report (LIB); Report (LIBMS)	Kenzo 12'	Stadium: Gelora Bung Karno Stadium; Attendance: 37,438; Referee: Agus Fauzan Arifin (Sleman)

9 July 2023 2	Persikabo 1973	0–0	Persija Jakarta	Cibinong, Bogor Regency, West Java
19:00 UTC+7		Report (LIB); Report (LIBMS)		Stadium: Pakansari Stadium; Attendance: 6,467; Referee: M. Erfan Effendi (Surabaya)

16 July 2023 3	Persija Jakarta	4–1	Bhayangkara Presisi Indonesia F.C.	Bekasi, West Java
19:00 UTC+7	Riko 15'; Šimić 18' (pen.), 34'; Akbar 73'	Report (LIB); Report (LIBMS)	Crislan 5'	Stadium: Patriot Chandrabhaga Stadium; Attendance: 15,015; Referee: Yudi Nurcahya (Bandung)

22 July 2023 4	Persita Tangerang	1–0	Persija Jakarta	Kelapa Dua, Tangerang Regency, Banten
15:00 UTC+7	Esal 81'	Report (LIB); Report (LIBMS)		Stadium: Indomilk Arena; Attendance: 10,017; Referee: Asep Yandis (Karawang)

30 July 2023 5	Persija Jakarta	1–0	Persebaya Surabaya	Central Jakarta, Jakarta
19:00 UTC+7	Ryo 38'	Report (LIB); Report (LIBMS)		Stadium: Gelora Bung Karno Stadium; Attendance: 55,103; Referee: Armyn Dwi Suryathin (Lubuklinggau)

4 August 2023 6	PSS Sleman	1–3	Persija Jakarta	Sleman, Special Region of Yogyakarta
19:00 UTC+7	Bustos 72'	Report (LIB); Report (LIBMS)	Hanif 16'; Firza 24'; Ryo 52'	Stadium: Maguwoharjo Stadium; Attendance: 15,857; Referee: Nendi Rohaendi (Bandung)

9 August 2023 7	Persija Jakarta	1–1	Borneo F.C. Samarinda	Bekasi, West Java
19:00 UTC+7	Rizky Ridho 37'	Report (LIB); Report (LIBMS)	Lilipaly 14'	Stadium: Patriot Chandrabhaga Stadium; Attendance: 10.927; Referee: Naufal Adya Fairuski (Bandung)

13 August 2023 8	Madura United F.C.	2–0	Persija Jakarta	Bangkalan, East Java
19:00 UTC+7	Brandão 38', 48'	Report (LIB); Report (LIBMS)		Stadium: Gelora Bangkalan Stadium; Attendance: 4,616; Referee: Ginanjar Rahman Latief (Soreang)

20 August 2023 9	Persija Jakarta	2–2	Arema F.C.	Bekasi, West Java
15:00 UTC+7	Gajos 23'; Hanif 45+3'	Report (LIB); Report (LIBMS)	Gustavo 38', 88'	Stadium: Patriot Chandrabhaga Stadium; Attendance: 21,211; Referee: Rio Permana Putra (Pekanbaru)

25 August 2023 10	Dewa United F.C.	2–0	Persija Jakarta	Kelapa Dua, Tangerang Regency, Banten
19:00 UTC+7	Kolovos 60'; Septian 90+5'	Report (LIB); Report (LIBMS)		Stadium: Indomilk Arena; Attendance: 1,225; Referee: Yudi Nurcahya (Bandung)

2 September 2023 11	Persija Jakarta	1–1	Persib Bandung	Bekasi, West Java
15:00 UTC+7	Šimić 14'	Report (LIB); Report (LIBMS)	Da Silva 85'	Stadium: Patriot Chandrabhaga Stadium; Attendance: 27,920; Referee: M. Erfan Effendi (Surabaya)

17 September 2023 12	Persik Kediri	1–2	Persija Jakarta	Kediri, East Java
19:00 UTC+7	Khanafi 35'	Report (LIB); Report (LIBMS)	Firza 68'; Kúdela 90+5' (pen.)	Stadium: Brawijaya Stadium; Attendance: 4,957; Referee: Ginanjar Rahman Latief (Soreang)

24 September 2023 13	Persija Jakarta	1–1	Bali United F.C.	Bekasi, West Java
19:00 UTC+7	Kúdela 74'	Report (LIB); Report (LIBMS)	R. Arjuna 12'	Stadium: Patriot Chandrabhaga Stadium; Attendance: 11,923; Referee: Aidil Azmi (Banda Aceh)

30 September 2023 14	Persis Solo	2–2	Persija Jakarta	Surakarta, Central Java
19:00 UTC+7	Sutanto 32'; Altahf 50'	Report (LIB); Report (LIBMS)	Bias 2'; Aji 80'	Stadium: Manahan Stadium; Attendance: 17,010; Referee: Nendi Rohaendi (Bandung)

7 October 2023 15	Persija Jakarta	1–1	PS Barito Putera	Bekasi, West Java
19:00 UTC+7	Ryo 30'	Report (LIB); Report (LIBMS)	Renan 67'	Stadium: Patriot Chandrabhaga Stadium; Attendance: 8,672; Referee: Ryan Nanda Saputra (Bandung)

22 October 2023 16	Persija Jakarta	1–2	RANS Nusantara F.C.	Bekasi, West Java
19:00 UTC+7	Ferarri 58'	Report (LIB); Report (LIBMS)	Brandão 11' (pen.); Meneses 56'	Stadium: Patriot Chandrabhaga Stadium; Attendance: 7,024; Referee: Naufal Adya Fairuski (Bandung)

29 October 2023 17	PSIS Semarang	2–1	Persija Jakarta	Semarang, Central Java
19:00 UTC+7	Lucão 16'; Fortes 26'	Report (LIB); Report (LIBMS)	Ryo 32'	Stadium: Jatidiri Stadium; Attendance: 18,276; Referee: Yudi Nurcahya (Bandung)

===== Second round =====
3 November 2023 18	PSM Makassar	2–3	Persija Jakarta	Parepare, South Sulawesi
20:00 UTC+8	Safrudin 61'; Mansaray 63'	Report (LIB); Report (LIBMS)	Witan 27', 82'; Ryo 49'	Stadium: Gelora B.J. Habibie Stadium; Attendance: 7,781; Referee: Armyn Dwi Suryathin (Lubuklinggau)

9 November 2023 19	Persija Jakarta	4–0	Persikabo 1973	Bekasi, West Java
19:00 UTC+7	Witan 31'; Hanif 57'; Ferarri 65'; Abimanyu 77'	Report (LIB); Report (LIBMS)		Stadium: Patriot Chandrabhaga Stadium; Attendance: 6,176; Referee: Rio Permana Putra (Pekanbaru)

25 November 2023 20	Bhayangkara Presisi Indonesia F.C.	2–2	Persija Jakarta	Bekasi, West Java
19:00 UTC+7	Mier 24'; Ragil 90+1'	Report (LIB); Report (LIBMS)	Aji 51'; Ryo 63'	Stadium: Patriot Chandrabhaga Stadium; Attendance: 236; Referee: Asep Yandis (Karawang)

3 December 2023 21	Persija Jakarta	1–1	Persita Tangerang	Central Jakarta, Jakarta
19:00 UTC+7	Gajos 66'	Report (LIB); Report (LIBMS)	Vidal 74'	Stadium: Gelora Bung Karno Stadium; Attendance: 33,375; Referee: Thoriq Munir Alkatiri (Bandung)

9 December 2023 22	Persebaya Surabaya	1–1	Persija Jakarta	Surabaya, East Java
15:00 UTC+7	Bruno 25'	Report (LIB); Report (LIBMS)	Gajos 7'	Stadium: Gelora Bung Tomo Stadium; Attendance: 9,180; Referee: Nendi Rohaendi (Bandung)

16 December 2023 23	Persija Jakarta	1–0	PSS Sleman	Bekasi, West Java
19:00 UTC+7	Kúdela 90+4' (pen.)	Report (LIB); Report (LIBMS)		Stadium: Patriot Chandrabhaga Stadium; Attendance: 13,963; Referee: Futoshi Nakamura (Saitama, Japan)

6 February 2024 24	Borneo F.C. Samarinda	3–1	Persija Jakarta	Balikpapan, East Kalimantan
20:00 UTC+8	Sihran 25'; Pluim 47'; Komang 82'	Report (LIB); Report (LIBMS)	Gustavo 90+2'	Stadium: Batakan Stadium; Attendance: 11,833; Referee: Candra (Padang)

22 February 2024 25	Persija Jakarta	0-1	Madura United F.C.	Gianyar, Bali
19:00 UTC+7		Report (LIB); Report (LIBMS)	Riski 86'	Stadium: Kapten I Wayan Dipta Stadium; Attendance: 533; Referee: Sance Lawita (Manado)

26 February 2024 26	Arema F.C.	3-2	Persija Jakarta	Gianyar, Bali
16:00 UTC+8	Dedik 20', 36' (pen.); Lokolingoy 78'	Report (LIB); Report (LIBMS)	Šimić 12', 56'	Stadium: Kapten I Wayan Dipta Stadium; Attendance: 154; Referee: Tomi Manggopa (Bolaang Mongondow)

2 March 2024 27	Persija Jakarta	4-1	Dewa United F.C.	Gianyar, Bali
19:00 UTC+7	Šimić 15', 29'; Ryo 51', 56'	Report (LIB); Report (LIBMS)	Mitrevski 37'	Stadium: Kapten I Wayan Dipta Stadium; Attendance: 542; Referee: Yudi Nurcahya (Bandung)

9 March 2024 28	Persib Bandung	2–1	Persija Jakarta	Soreang, Bandung Regency, West Java
15:00 UTC+7	David 24', 69' (pen.)	Report (LIB); Report (LIBMS)	Gajos 28'	Stadium: Si Jalak Harupat Stadium; Attendance: 0 Referee: Candra (Padang)

16 March 2024 29	Persija Jakarta	2–0	Persik Kediri	Gianyar, Bali
20:30 UTC+7	Šimić 20', 90+2'	Report (LIB); Report (LIBMS)		Stadium: Kapten I Wayan Dipta Stadium; Attendance: 170; Referee: Ryan Nanda Saputra (Bandung)

30 March 2024 30	Bali United F.C.	1-0	Persija Jakarta	Gianyar, Bali
21:30 UTC+8	Spasojevic 90+7' (pen.)	Report (LIB); Report (LIBMS)		Stadium: Kapten I Wayan Dipta Stadium; Attendance: 9,499; Referee: Armyn Dwi Suryathin (Lubuklinggau)

4 April 2024 31	Persija Jakarta	1-0	Persis Solo	Central Jakarta, Jakarta
20:30 UTC+7	Šimić 79'	Report (LIB); Report (LIBMS)		Stadium: Gelora Bung Karno Stadium; Attendance: 27,009; Referee: Rio Permana Putra (Pekanbaru)

15 April 2024 32	PS Barito Putera	2-2	Persija Jakarta	Bantul, Special Region of Yogyakarta
19:00 UTC+7	Bagus 45+1'; Eksel 47'	Report (LIB); Report (LIBMS)	Ryo 44'; Akbar 75'	Stadium: Sultan Agung Stadium; Attendance: 0 Referee: Yudi Nurcahya (Bandung)

21 April 2024 33	RANS Nusantara F.C.	0-1	Persija Jakarta	Bantul, Special Region of Yogyakarta
19:00 UTC+7		Report (LIB); Report (LIBMS)	Gustavo 31'	Stadium: Sultan Agung Stadium; Attendance: 0 Referee: Thoriq Munir Alkatiri (Bandung)

30 April 2024 34	Persija Jakarta	2-1	PSIS Semarang	Central Jakarta, Jakarta
15:00 UTC+7	Šimić 67'; Gajos 73'	Report (LIB); Report (LIBMS)	Fredyan 64'	Stadium: Gelora Bung Karno Stadium; Referee: M. Erfan Efendi (Surabaya)

== Statistics ==
=== Squad appearances and goals ===
Last updated on 8 June 2024

No.	Pos	Nat	Player	Total		Liga 1		Piala Indonesia	
No.	Pos	Nat	Player	Apps	Goals	Apps	Goals	Apps	Goals
Goalkeepers
13	GK	(Indonesia) IDN	Adre Arido Geovani	0	0	0	0	0	0
26	GK	(Indonesia) IDN	Andritany Ardhiyasa	32	0	31+1	0	0	0
50	GK	(Indonesia) IDN	Cahya Supriadi	3	0	3	0	0	0
Defenders
2	DF	(Indonesia) IDN	Ilham Rio Fahmi	21	0	17+4	0	0	0
6	DF	(Indonesia) IDN	Tony Sucipto	5	0	0+5	0	0	0
11	DF	(Indonesia) IDN	Firza Andika	29	2	28+1	2	0	0
17	DF	(Czech Republic) CZE	Ondřej Kúdela	27	3	27	3	0	0
23	DF	(Indonesia) IDN	Hansamu Yama Pranata	14	0	12+2	0	0	0
33	DF	(Indonesia) IDN	Muhammad Akbar Arjunsyah	18	2	8+10	2	0	0
41	DF	(Indonesia) IDN	Muhammad Ferarri	18	2	18	2	0	0
56	DF	(Indonesia) IDN	Maman Abdurrahman	4	0	1+3	0	0	0
57	DF	(Indonesia) IDN	Muhammad Rafa Raditya Abdurrahman	1	0	0+1	0	0	0
74	DF	(Indonesia) IDN	Rizky Ridho Ramadhani	24	1	23+1	1	0	0
Midfielders
7	MF	(Japan) JPN	Ryo Matsumura	33	10	33	10	0	0
8	MF	(Indonesia) IDN	Syahrian Abimanyu	25	1	17+8	1	0	0
10	MF	(Poland) POL	Maciej Jacek Gajos	28	5	28	5	0	0
19	MF	(Indonesia) IDN	Hanif Abdurrauf Sjahbandi	26	2	20+6	2	0	0
22	MF	(Philippines) PHI	Oliver Saludares Bias	24	1	17+7	1	0	0
24	MF	(Indonesia) IDN	Resky Fandi Witriawan	32	0	24+8	0	0	0
25	MF	(Indonesia) IDN	Riko Simanjuntak	31	1	22+9	1	0	0
58	DF	(Indonesia) IDN	Muhammad Rayhan Hannan	25	0	12+13	0	0	0
73	MF	(Indonesia) IDN	Sandi Arta Samosir	11	0	1+10	0	0	0
77	MF	(Indonesia) IDN	Dony Tri Pamungkas	21	0	4+17	0	0	0
Forwards
9	FW	(Croatia) CRO	Marko Šimić	27	11	16+11	11	0	0
70	MF	(Brazil) BRA	Gustavo Almeida dos Santos	7	2	6+1	2	0	0
99	FW	(Indonesia) IDN	Aji Kusuma	21	2	2+19	2	0	0
Players who have made an appearance or had a squad number this season but have left the club
21	MF	(Indonesia) IDN	Alfriyanto Nico Saputro	6	0	0+6	0	0	0
55	DF	(Indonesia) IDN	Dandi Maulana Abdulhak	0	0	0	0	0	0
57	DF	(Indonesia) IDN	Muhammad Amar Fadzillah	0	0	0	0	0	0
78	MF	(Indonesia) IDN	Witan Sulaeman	18	3	10+8	3	0	0

Last updated: 8 June 2024.
Source: Soccerway

=== Top scorers ===
The list is sorted by shirt number when total goals are equal.

Rnk	Pos	No.	Player	Liga 1	Piala Indonesia	Total
1	CF	9	(Croatia) Marko Šimić	11	0	11
2	MF	7	(Japan) Ryo Matsumura	10	0	10
3	MF	10	(Poland) Maciej Jacek Gajos	5	0	5
4	DF	19	(Indonesia) Hanif Abdurrauf Sjahbandi	3	0	3
4	MF	78	(Indonesia) Witan Sulaeman	3	0	3
4	DF	17	(Czech Republic) Ondřej Kúdela	3	0	3
5	DF	11	(Indonesia) Firza Andika	2	0	2
5	DF	41	(Indonesia) Muhammad Ferarri	2	0	2
5	MF	10	(Indonesia) Aji Kusuma	2	0	2
5	DF	33	(Indonesia) Muhammad Akbar Arjunsyah	2	0	2
5	FW	70	(Brazil) Gustavo Almeida dos Santos	2	0	2
6	MF	25	(Indonesia) Riko Simanjuntak	1	0	1
6	DF	74	(Indonesia) Rizky Ridho Ramadhani	1	0	1
6	MF	10	(Philippines) Oliver Saludares Bias	1	0	1
6	MF	8	(Indonesia) Syahrian Abimanyu	1	0	1
Total				49	0	49

Last updated: 8 June 2024.
Source: Soccerway

=== Top assist ===
The list is sorted by shirt number when total assists are equal.

Rnk	Pos	No.	Player	Liga 1	Piala Indonesia	Total
1	MF	7	(Japan) Ryo Matsumura	9	0	9
2	MF	10	(Poland) Maciej Jacek Gajos	7	0	7
3	MF	78	(Indonesia) Witan Sulaeman	5	0	5
4	DF	17	(Czech Republic) Ondřej Kúdela	4	0	4
5	MF	19	(Indonesia) Hanif Abdurrauf Sjahbandi	3	0	3
5	DF	11	(Indonesia) Firza Andika	3	0	3
6	MF	25	(Indonesia) Riko Simanjuntak	2	0	2
6	MF	8	(Indonesia) Muhammad Rayhan Hannan	2	0	2
7	DF	23	(Indonesia) Hansamu Yama Pranata	1	0	1
7	MF	8	(Indonesia) Syahrian Abimanyu	1	0	1
7	MF	77	(Indonesia) Dony Tri Pamungkas	1	0	1
7	DF	74	(Indonesia) Rizky Ridho Ramadhani	1	0	1
7	DF	2	(Indonesia) Ilham Rio Fahmi	1	0	1
7	FW	80	(Brazil) Gustavo Almeida dos Santos	1	0	1
Total				41	0	41

Last updated: 8 June 2024.

=== Clean sheets ===
The list is sorted by shirt number when total clean sheets are equal.

Rnk	No.	Player	Liga 1	Piala Indonesia	Total
1	26	(Indonesia) Andritany Ardhiyasa	8	0	8
Total			8	0	8

Last updated: 8 June 2024.
Source: Soccerway

=== Disciplinary record ===
Includes all competitive matches. Players listed below made at least one appearance for Persija Jakarta first squad during the season.

Rnk	Pos.	No.	Nat.	Name	Liga 1			Piala Indonesia			Total			Disciplinary Points	Notes
Rnk	Pos.	No.	Nat.	Name	Yellow card	Second yellow card	Red card	Yellow card	Second yellow card	Red card	Yellow card	Second yellow card	Red card	Disciplinary Points	Notes
1	DF	11	(Indonesia)	Firza Andika	6	1	1	0	0	0	6	1	1	11	
2	DF	74	(Indonesia)	Rizky Ridho Ramadhani	8	1	0	0	0	0	8	1	0	10	
3	MF	8	(Indonesia)	Syahrian Abimanyu	7	1	0	0	0	0	7	1	0	9	
4	MF	24	(Indonesia)	Resky Fandi Witriawan	8	0	0	0	0	0	8	0	0	8	
4	DF	41	(Indonesia)	Muhammad Ferarri	5	0	1	0	0	0	5	0	1	8	
5	MF	58	(Indonesia)	Muhammad Rayhan Hannan	7	0	0	0	0	0	7	0	0	7	
5	MF	19	(Indonesia)	Hanif Abdurrauf Sjahbandi	4	0	1	0	0	0	4	0	1	7	
6	MF	10	(Poland)	Maciej Jacek Gajos	5	0	0	0	0	0	5	0	0	5	
7	DF	23	(Indonesia)	Hansamu Yama Pranata	4	0	0	0	0	0	4	0	0	4	
7	DF	17	(Czech Republic)	Ondřej Kúdela	4	0	0	0	0	0	4	0	0	4	
8	OFF		(Indonesia)	Ganesha Putra	0	0	1	0	0	0	0	0	1	3	
8	MF	7	(Japan)	Ryo Matsumura	3	0	0	0	0	0	3	0	0	3	
8	DF	22	(Philippines)	Oliver Saludares Bias	3	0	0	0	0	0	3	0	0	3	
8	MF	73	(Indonesia)	Sandi Arta Samosir	3	0	0	0	0	0	3	0	0	3	
9	MGR		(Germany)	Thomas Jens Uwe Doll	2	0	0	0	0	0	2	0	0	2	
9	FW	99	(Indonesia)	Aji Kusuma	2	0	0	0	0	0	2	0	0	2	
9	ASS MGR		(Italy)	Pasquale Domenico Rocco	2	0	0	0	0	0	2	0	0	2	
9	70	FW	(Brazil)	Gustavo Almeida dos Santos	2	0	0	0	0	0	2	0	0	2	
10	2	DF	(Indonesia)	Ilham Rio Fahmi	1	0	0	0	0	0	1	0	0	1	
10	78	MF	(Indonesia)	Witan Sulaeman	1	0	0	0	0	0	1	0	0	1	
10	21	MF	(Indonesia)	Alfriyanto Nico Saputro	1	0	0	0	0	0	1	0	0	1	
10	25	MF	(Indonesia)	Riko Simanjuntak	1	0	0	0	0	0	1	0	0	1	
10	26	GK	(Indonesia)	Andritany Ardhiyasa	1	0	0	0	0	0	1	0	0	1	
10	33	DF	(Indonesia)	Muhammad Akbar Arjunsyah	1	0	0	0	0	0	1	0	0	1	
10	9	FW	(Croatia)	Marko Šimić	1	0	0	0	0	0	1	0	0	1	

Last updated: 8 June 2024
Source: Competitions
Only competitive matches
(yellow card) = Number of bookings; (second yellow card) = Number of sending offs after a second yellow card; (red card) = Number of sending offs by a direct red card.

=== Summary ===
Games played	34 (34 Liga 1)
Games won	12 (12 Liga 1)
Games drawn	12 (12 Liga 1)
Games lost	10 (10 Liga 1)
Goals scored	49 (49 Liga 1)
Goals conceded	41 (41 Liga 1)
Goal difference	+8 (+8 Liga 1)
Clean sheets	8 (8 Liga 1)
Yellow cards	85 (85 Liga 1)
Red cards	7 (7 Liga 1)
Most appearances	(Japan) Ryo Matsumura (33 appearances)
Top scorer	(Croatia) Marko Šimić (11 Goals)
Top assist	(Japan) Ryo Matsumura (9 Assists)
Winning Percentage	12/34 (35.29%)

Last updated: 8 June 2024.
Source: Liga 1
