= Gajos =

Gajos is a Polish surname. Archaic feminine forms: Gajosowa (by husband), Gajosówna (by father). Notable people with the surname include:

- Janusz Gajos (born 1939), Polish actor
- Maciej Gajos (born 1991), Polish footballer
