= 2023 PSSI U-20 Mini Tournament =

Football tournament in Indonesia at 2023

Turnamen Mini U-20 PSSI 2023

Tournament details
- Host country: Indonesia
- Dates: 17–21 February 2023
- Teams: 4
- Venue: 1 (in 1 host city)

Final positions
- Champions: Guatemala
- Runners-up: New Zealand
- Third place: Indonesia
- Fourth place: Fiji

Tournament statistics
- Matches played: 6
- Goals scored: 19 (3.17 per match)
- Top scorer(s): (Guatemala) Jeffry Bantes (New Zealand) Oliver Colloty (New Zealand) Jay Herdman (2 goals each)

The 2023 PSSI U-20 Mini Tournament (Indonesian: Turnamen Mini U-20 PSSI 2023) is a football tournament organized by the Football Association of Indonesia (PSSI) as part of the Indonesia U20 national team preparations for the 2023 FIFA U-20 World Cup which, at the time of this tournament taken place, would be held in Indonesia (lately they lost the rights of hosts).

This tournament was held on 17–21 February 2023 and was attended by 4 countries that managed to qualify for the 2023 FIFA U-20 World Cup finals including Indonesia.

== Participating teams ==
- Indonesia (AFC; host)
- Fiji (OFC)
- Guatemala (CONCACAF)
- New Zealand (OFC)

== Venue ==
The tournament itself was held at Gelora Bung Karno Main Stadium after previously there was talk that it would be held at Patriot Chandrabhaga Stadium.

== Standings ==
Pos	Team	Pld	W	D	L	GF	GA	GD	Pts
1	Guatemala	3	3	0	0	7	2	+5	9
2	New Zealand	3	2	0	1	6	4	+2	6
3	Indonesia (H)	3	1	0	2	5	3	+2	3
4	Fiji	3	0	0	3	1	10	−9	0

Source: Report
(H) Hosts

== Matches ==
All matches use the UTC+7 (WIB) time zone

17 February 2023
16:30

New Zealand	1–3	Guatemala
Colloty 7'	Report	Cordozza 54'; Bantes 60'; Avendaño 80'

Gelora Bung Karno Main Stadium, Jakarta
Referee: Fariq Hitaba (Indonesia)
17 February 2023
19:30

Indonesia	4–0	Fiji
Arkhan 35'; Kakang 49'; Resa 60'; Hokky 86'	Report

Gelora Bung Karno Main Stadium, Jakarta
Referee: Thoriq Alkatiri (Indonesia)

19 February 2023
16:30

Fiji	1–3	Guatemala
Razool 13'	Report	Muñoz 68'; Bantes 82'; Palencia 90+1'

Gelora Bung Karno Main Stadium, Jakarta
Referee: Aprisman Aranda (Indonesia)
19 February 2023
19:30

Indonesia	1–2	New Zealand
Ferarri 90+5'	Report	Colloty 58'; Herdman 70'

Gelora Bung Karno Main Stadium, Jakarta
Referee: Fariq Hitaba (Indonesia)

21 February 2023
16:30

Fiji	0–3	New Zealand
	Report	Beale 4'; Hall 7'; Herdman 51'

Gelora Bung Karno Main Stadium, Jakarta
21 February 2023
19:30

Indonesia	0–1	Guatemala
	Report	Solorzano 22'

Gelora Bung Karno Main Stadium, Jakarta
Referee: Thoriq Alkatiri (Indonesia)

== List of goalscorers ==
There were 19 goals scored in 6 matches, for an average of 3.17 goals per match.

2 goals

- (Guatemala) Jeffry Bantes
- (New Zealand) Jay Herdman
- (New Zealand) Oliver Colloty

1 goal

- (Fiji) Gulam Razool
- (Guatemala) Daniel Cordozza
- (Guatemala) Eddy Palencia
- (Guatemala) Jorge Solorzano
- (Guatemala) Luca Avendaño
- (Guatemala) Rudy Muñoz
- (Indonesia) Arkhan Fikri
- (Indonesia) Hokky Caraka
- (Indonesia) Kakang Rudianto
- (Indonesia) Muhammad Ferarri
- (Indonesia) Resa Aditya
- (New Zealand) Charlie Beale
- (New Zealand) Oscar Obel Hall
