= Ondřej Kúdela =

Czech footballer (born 1987)

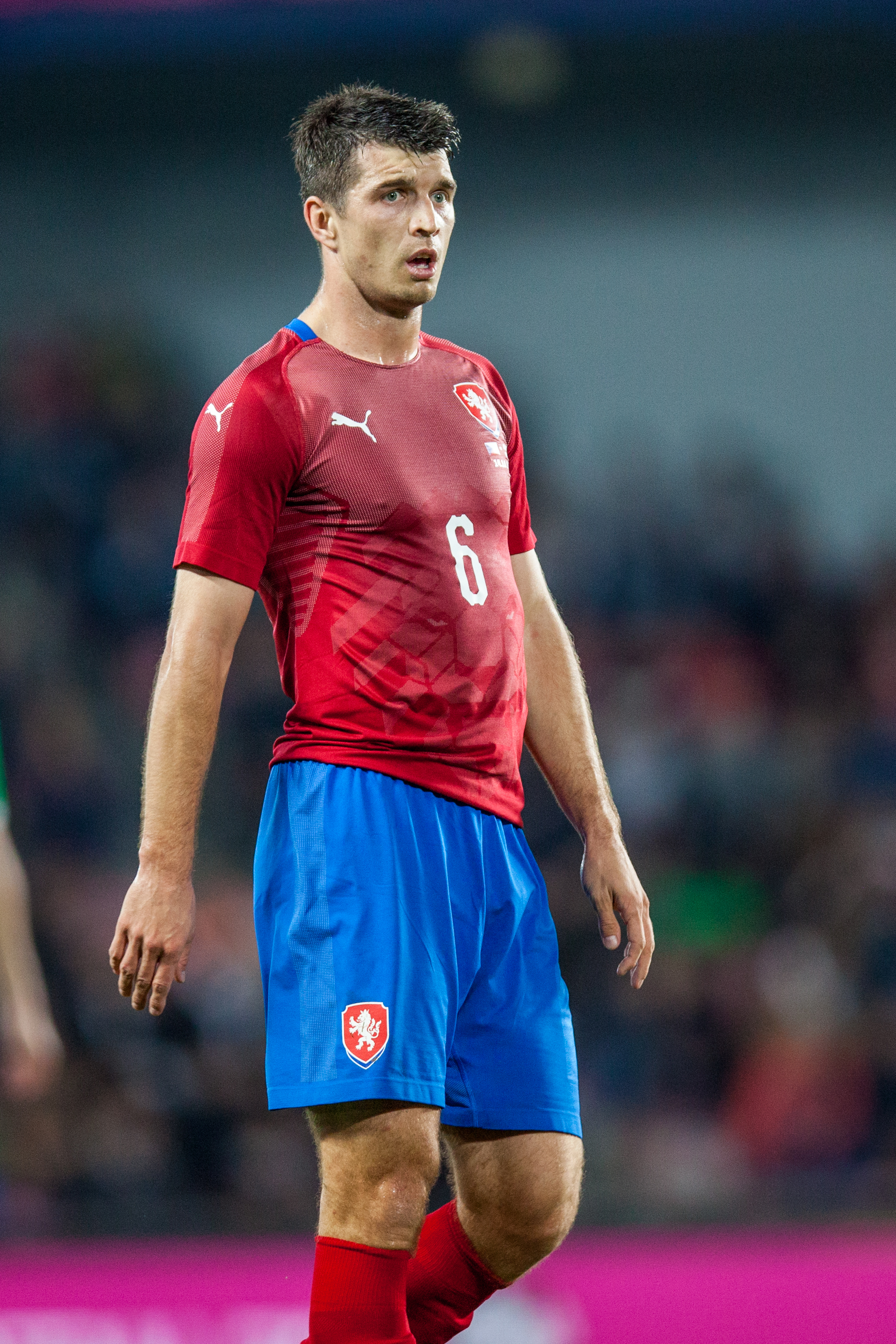
- Kúdela playing for the Czech Republic in 2019

Personal information
- Full name: Ondřej Kúdela
- Date of birth: 26 March 1987 (age 39)
- Place of birth: Bojkovice, Czechoslovakia
- Height: 1.82 m (6 ft 0 in)
- Position: Centre-back

Team information
- Current team: Sellier & Bellot Vlašim (assistant)

Youth career
- 1997–2005: Slovácko

Senior career*
Years	Team	Apps	(Gls)
2005–2007	Slovácko	31	(1)
2007–2009	Sparta Prague	6	(0)
2007	→ Kladno (loan)	10	(1)
2009–2017	Mladá Boleslav	177	(9)
2014	→ Ordabasy (loan)	14	(0)
2017–2018	Slovan Liberec	29	(0)
2018–2022	Slavia Prague	100	(14)
2022–2025	Persija Jakarta	82	(6)
2025–2026	Viktoria Žižkov	5	(0)

International career^{‡}
2003–2004	Czech Republic U17	11	(0)
2005	Czech Republic U18	4	(0)
2006	Czech Republic U19	8	(0)
2006–2007	Czech Republic U20	12	(3)
2007–2008	Czech Republic U21	12	(0)
2019–2022	Czech Republic	10	(0)

Managerial career
- 2026–: Sellier & Bellot Vlašim (assistant)
- * Club domestic league appearances and goals as of 28 May 2026 ‡ National team caps and goals as of 25 September 2024

Ondřej Kúdela (Czech pronunciation: [ˈondr̝ɛj ˈkuːdɛla]; born 26 March 1987) is a Czech former professional footballer who played as a centre-back. He played for Slovácko, Sparta Prague, Mlada Boleslav, Slovan Liberec, and Slavia Prague. Kúdela also had loan spells at Kladno and Kazakh club FC Ordabasy.

== Club career ==
Kúdela came up through the youth system at Slovácko and made his debut appearance for the first team in 2005.

In 2009, Kúdela was signed by Mladá Boleslav as a replacement for the outgoing Jan Rajnoch. He remained at the club for eight seasons, except for a half-year loan spell at Kazakh side Ordabasy in 2014. He was part of the Mladá Boleslav team that won the 2010–11 and 2015–16 Czech Cups, coming off as a substitute at the eighth minute of the former final.

In January 2017, Kúdela signed a contract with Slovan Liberec for two-and-a-half years.

In 2018, Kúdela transferred to Slavia Prague along with head coach Jindřich Trpišovský. With the club, he won a total of three league titles and cups each, as well as one Supercup.

In June 2022, Kúdela joined Indonesian Liga 1 side Persija Jakarta. On 23 July 2022, he made his league debut as a starter in a 0–1 loss against Bali United.

On 23 July 2025, Kúdela signed a contract with Viktoria Žižkov.

== International career ==
In March 2019, Kúdela debuted for the Czech senior squad during a friendly match against Brazil.

== Controversy ==
On 18 March 2021, Kúdela was accused of racial abuse on Glen Kamara during a Europa League Round of 16 match. Kúdela denied the accusation and claimed he was assaulted by Kamara in the tunnel after the match, and Slavia Prague lodged a criminal complaint while criticising Rangers' handling of the situation. On 14 April, he was officially found guilty of racial abuse by UEFA and was banned for ten UEFA matches, ruling him out of playing any game in the upcoming Euro 2020 championship; Kamara meanwhile was handed a three-match ban for assaulting Kúdela in the tunnel after the game.

Kúdela appealed his ban, but the appeal was rejected by UEFA on 26 May 2021. He began the process of appealing the ban to the Court of Arbitration for Sport, with a statement being scheduled for April 2022. However, one month before the hearing was due to take place, Kúdela dropped his appeal and formally apologised to Kamara. Kamara's lawyer said that his client was happy that the matter had now been closed.

== Style of play ==
Kúdela is normally played as a centre-back, though he has also been used as a defensive midfielder. At the end of the 2021 season, he was voted as the best defender in the Czech league.

== Career statistics ==
=== Club ===
As of match played 4 May 2025

Appearances and goals by club, season and competition
Club	Season	League			Cup		Continental		Other		Total	
Club	Season	Division	Apps	Goals	Apps	Goals	Apps	Goals	Apps	Goals	Apps	Goals
Slovácko	2004–05	Czech First League	1	0	—		—		—		1	0
Slovácko	2005–06	Czech First League	12	1	0	0	—		—		12	1
Slovácko	2006–07	Czech First League	18	0	0	0	—		—		18	0
Slovácko	Total		31	1	0	0	—		—		31	1
Kladno (loan)	2007–08	Czech First League	10	1	0	0	—		—		10	1
Sparta Prague	2008–09	Czech First League	6	0	0	0	1	0	—		7	0
Mladá Boleslav	2008–09	Czech First League	8	1	0	0	—		—		8	1
Mladá Boleslav	2009–10	Czech First League	25	1	0	0	—		—		25	1
Mladá Boleslav	2010–11	Czech First League	15	0	1	0	—		—		16	0
Mladá Boleslav	2011–12	Czech First League	26	5	2	0	2	0	1	0	31	5
Mladá Boleslav	2012–13	Czech First League	24	1	3	0	4	0	—		31	1
Mladá Boleslav	2013–14	Czech First League	29	0	5	0	—		—		34	0
Mladá Boleslav	2014–15	Czech First League	5	0	1	0	—		—		6	0
Mladá Boleslav	2015–16	Czech First League	29	1	6	0	2	0	—		37	1
Mladá Boleslav	2016–17	Czech First League	16	0	2	0	2	0	—		20	0
Mladá Boleslav	Total		177	9	20	0	10	0	1	0	208	9
Ordabasy (loan)	2014	Kazakhstan Premier League	14	0	0	0	—		—		14	0
Slovan Liberec	2016–17	Czech First League	14	0	2	0	—		—		16	0
Slovan Liberec	2017–18	Czech First League	15	0	2	0	—		—		17	0
Slovan Liberec	Total		29	0	4	0	—		—		33	0
Slavia Prague	2017–18	Czech First League	7	0	1	0	—		—		8	0
Slavia Prague	2018–19	Czech First League	22	3	2	0	9	0	—		33	3
Slavia Prague	2019–20	Czech First League	30	2	1	0	8	0	1	0	40	2
Slavia Prague	2020–21	Czech First League	29	6	4	0	9	0	—		42	6
Slavia Prague	2021–22	Czech First League	12	3	0	0	4	0	—		16	3
Slavia Prague	Total		100	14	8	0	30	0	1	0	139	14
Persija Jakarta	2022–23	Liga 1	31	2	0	0	0	0	—		31	2
Persija Jakarta	2023–24	Liga 1	27	3	0	0	0	0	—		27	3
Persija Jakarta	2024–25	Liga 1	24	1	0	0	0	0	—		24	1
Persija Jakarta	Total		82	6	0	0	0	0	0	0	82	6
Career total			449	31	32	0	41	0	2	0	524	31

=== International ===
As of match played 25 September 2022

Appearances and goals by national team and year
National team	Year	Apps	Goals
Czech Republic	2008	1	0
Czech Republic	2019	3	0
Czech Republic	2020	2	0
Czech Republic	2021	3	0
Czech Republic	2022	1	0
Total		10	0

== Honours ==
SK Slavia Prague

- Czech First League: 2018–19, 2019–20, 2020–21
- Czech Cup: 2017–18, 2018–19, 2020–21

Czech Rupublic U-20

- FIFA U-20 World Cup runner-up: 2007

Individual

- Czech First League Defender of the Year: 2020–21
- Liga 1 Team of the Season: 2022–23
