= Oliver Bias =

Footballer (born 2001)

Personal information
- Full name: Oliver Saludares Bias
- Date of birth: 15 June 2001 (age 25)
- Place of birth: Johanngeorgenstadt, Germany
- Height: 1.64 m (5 ft 5 in)
- Position: Winger

Team information
- Current team: One Taguig
- Number: 24

Youth career
- –2015: Erzgebirge Aue
- 2015–2020: RB Leipzig

Senior career*
Years	Team	Apps	(Gls)
2018–2020	RB Leipzig	0	(0)
2020	Optik Rathenow	2	(0)
2021	Nitra	0	(0)
2021–2023	ADT	5	(0)
2022–2023	Chiangmai United	3	(0)
2023–2024	Příbram	0	(0)
2023–2024	→ Persija Jakarta (loan)	24	(1)
2024–	One Taguig	8	(1)

International career^{‡}
2016	Germany U15	2	(0)
2016–2017	Germany U16	4	(0)
2018	Germany U17	3	(0)
2021	Philippines U23	9	(0)
2021–	Philippines	11	(0)
- * Club domestic league appearances and goals as of 9 February 2025 ‡ National team caps and goals as of 2 January 2023

Oliver Saludares Bias (German pronunciation: [ˈbiːas]; born 15 June 2001) is a professional footballer who plays as a winger for Philippines Football League side One Taguig. Born in Germany, and a former German youth international, he plays for the Philippines national team.

== Club career ==
=== RB Leipzig ===
Bias made his professional debut for RB Leipzig on 2 August 2018, coming on as a substitute in the 64th minute for Ibrahima Konaté in the UEFA Europa League qualifying match against Swedish club Häcken of the Allsvenskan. The match concluded in a 1–1 away draw.

=== FC Nitra ===
Bias joined Slovak Fortuna Liga club FC Nitra in late January 2021.

== International career ==
Bias was born to a German father and a Filipina mother which made him eligible to represent either Germany or Philippines at international level.

=== Germany youth ===
Bias has played for the youth national teams of Germany.

=== Philippines ===
Bias accepted a call-up to the Philippines national team in May 2021 for the 2022 FIFA World Cup qualifiers. He made his debut on 7 June against China PR, where he picked up a yellow card in their 2–0 loss.

=== Philippines U23 ===
He captained the Philippines U23 team at the 2022 AFC U-23 Asian Cup qualifiers; they finished last in their group with a winless campaign.

Bias was included in the 20-man squad for 31st Southeast Asian Games, which was held in Vietnam.
