= Jetis =

Jetis ꦗꦼꦠꦶꦱ꧀
- Kemantren
- Location in the city of Yogyakarta
- Coordinates: 7°46′59.3324″S 110°21′44.352″E
- Country: Indonesia
- Province: Yogyakarta
- City: City of Yogyakarta

Area
  - Total: 1,703 km^{2} (658 sq mi)

Population (2020)
  - Total: 27,337
  - Density: 16.05/km^{2} (41.58/sq mi)
- Time zone: UTC+07:00 (WIB)
- Postal Code: 55231 - 55233

Jetis is a city district (kemantren) in Yogyakarta City, Yogyakarta Province, Indonesia.
