= Ramón Bueno =

Spanish footballer

Personal information
- Full name: Ramón Bueno Gonzalbo
- Date of birth: 7 February 1995 (age 31)
- Place of birth: Burriana, Spain
- Height: 1.84 m (6 ft 0 in)
- Position: Midfielder

Youth career
- 2012: Villarreal Juvenil
- 2014–2015: Villarreal C

Senior career*
Years	Team	Apps	(Gls)
2016–2022	Villarreal B	89	(3)
2022–2023	Córdoba	3	(0)
2023	→ Fuenlabrada (loan)	11	(0)
2023–2024	Tarazona	21	(0)
2024–2025	Persija Jakarta	28	(0)
2026	Persita Tangerang	14	(0)
- * Club domestic league appearances and goals as of 23 May 2026

Ramón Bueno Gonzalbo (born 7 February 1995), is a Spanish professional footballer who plays as a midfielder.

== Club career ==
Born in Burriana, Spain, Bueno represented Villareal Juvenil, and Villareal C as a youth. After impressing in the academy team, ahead of the 2016 season, he joined Villareal and was immediately assigned to Villareal B in Segunda División B. He was included in Villarreal's first team squad for the 2016–17 UEFA Champions League qualifying, against Monaco. However, he was only on the bench for the first leg and was not included in the squad for the second leg.

Bueno played in 38 matches in the 2018–19 season. He was even linked with a move to Almería. However, he remained with Villarreal and played in 22 matches in the 2019–20 season until he was sidelined by injury and unable to play for 17 months. In the 2021–22 season, he returned to the pitch after suffering a complete tear of the anterior cruciate ligament and a partial tear of the medial collateral ligament in his right knee in January 2020. Now recovered from his injury, he has played in 17 matches.

In June 2022, Primera Federación side Córdoba announced the signing of Bueno for two-years contract. Bueno made his club debut on 4 September 2022, replacing Javi Flores in a 3–0 home win against Fuenlabrada. In 2023, Córdoba has reached an agreement to loan him to Fuenlabrada until the end of the season, with the aim of giving him more playing time. However, he remains under contract with Córdoba for another year.

In July 2023, Bueno joined Tarazona, previously, he left Córdoba in June due to a release clause that allowed the club to terminate the remaining year of his contract. He made 21 appearances for Tarazona, without scoring.

=== Persija Jakarta ===
On 16 July 2024, Bueno moved abroad for the first time in his career, after agreeing to a year contract with Indonesian Liga 1 side Persija Jakarta. He made his debut abroad five days later, replacing Hanif Sjahbandi in a 2–1 win over Madura United in a pre-season 2024 Indonesia President's Cup. And made his first league appearance on 10 August 2024, in a 3–0 won against Barito Putera.
