= Pablo Andrade =

Brazilian footballer

Personal information
- Full name: Pablo Andrade Plaza da Silva
- Date of birth: 15 February 1994 (age 32)
- Place of birth: Rio de Janeiro, Brazil
- Height: 1.80 m (5 ft 11 in)
- Position: Left-back

Team information
- Current team: One Taguig
- Number: 15

Youth career
- CFZ do Rio
- Grêmio

Senior career*
Years	Team	Apps	(Gls)
2014–2016	Botafogo	0	(0)
2016	→ Bangu (loan)	0	(0)
2016–2017	Silva	0	(0)
2017–2020	Ourense	0	(0)
2018	→ Rápido de Bouzas (loan)	15	(0)
2018–2019	→ Recreativo de Huelva (loan)	36	(0)
2019–2020	→ Rayo Majadahonda (loan)	20	(1)
2020–2021	Racing de Santander	6	(0)
2022	SJK	17	(0)
2023–2024	Lahti	24	(3)
2025	Persija Jakarta	15	(1)
2025–2026	PSBS Biak	32	(1)
2026–	One Taguig	0	(0)
- * Club domestic league appearances and goals as of 15 May 2026

Pablo Andrade Plaza da Silva (born 15 February 1994) is a Brazilian professional footballer who plays as a left-back for Philippines Football League club One Taguig.

== Club career ==
After starting in his native Brazil, Andrade played in Spain for five years. On 3 January 2022, he moved to Finland after signing with SJK Seinäjoki.

In April 2023, he joined FC Lahti. He was out of the line-up almost the whole season in 2023 due to injury.

In August 2025, it was officially announced that Andrade has signed with PSBS Biak. On 18 August 2025, Andrade made his league debut for PSBS in a 0–1 lose over Borneo Samarinda, coming on as a substitute for Sandro Sakho in the 77th minute.

== Career statistics ==
As of 15 May 2026.

Appearances and goals by club, season and competition
Club	Season	League			Cup		League cup		Continental		Total	
Club	Season	Division	Apps	Goals	Apps	Goals	Apps	Goals	Apps	Goals	Apps	Goals
Flamengo	2013	Série A	0	0	0	0	0	0	0	0	0	0
Bangu (loan)	2016	–	0	0	0	0	0	0	–		0	0
Botafogo	2016	Série A	0	0	0	0	0	0	0	0	0	0
Ourense	2017–18	Tercera División	0	0	–		–		–		0	0
Rápido de Bouzas (loan)	2017–18	Segunda División B	15	0	–		–		–		15	0
Recreativo de Huelva (loan)	2018–19	Segunda División B	36	0	–		–		–		36	0
Rayo Majadahonda (loan)	2019–20	Segunda División B	20	1	–		–		–		20	1
Racing de Santander	2020–21	Segunda División B	6	0	0	0	–		–		6	0
SJK Seinäjoki	2022	Veikkausliiga	17	0	0	0	3	0	4 (Note: Appearances in UEFA Conference League)	0	24	0
SJK Seinäjoki	2023	Veikkausliiga	0	0	0	0	5	0	–		5	0
SJK Seinäjoki	Total		17	0	0	0	8	0	4	0	29	0
Lahti	2023	Veikkausliiga	5	0	1	1	–		–		6	1
Lahti	2024	Veikkausliiga	19	3	2	0	1	0	–		22	3
Lahti	Total		24	3	3	1	1	0	0	0	28	4
Persija Jakarta	2024–25	Liga 1 Indonesia	15	1	0	0	–		–		15	1
PSBS Biak	2025–26	Super League	32	1	0	0	–		–		32	1
Career total			165	6	3	1	9	0	4	0	181	7
