= Resa Aditya =

Indonesian association footballer

Personal information
- Full name: Resa Aditya Nugraha
- Date of birth: 6 March 2004 (age 22)
- Place of birth: Sragen, Indonesia
- Height: 1.67 m (5 ft 6 in)
- Position: Midfielder

Team information
- Current team: Pekanbaru
- Number: 17

Youth career
- 2010–2019: SSB KFC
- 2019: PS TIRA
- 2020–2023: Persija Jakarta U20
- 2021: Garuda Select

Senior career*
Years	Team	Apps	(Gls)
2022–2025	Persija Jakarta	0	(0)
2023–2024	→ Sriwijaya (loan)	11	(0)
2024	→ Persiku Kudus (loan)	3	(0)
2025	→ Persikota Tangerang (loan)	1	(0)
2025–	Pekanbaru	9	(0)

International career^{‡}
2019	Indonesia U16	5	(0)
2023	Indonesia U20	4	(1)
Medal record
Men's football
Representing Indonesia
AFF U-16 Youth Championship
Third place	2019 Thailand
- * Club domestic league appearances and goals as of 4 January 2026 ‡ National team caps and goals as of 1 March 2023

Resa Aditya Nugraha (born 6 March 2004) is an Indonesian professional footballer who plays as a midfielder for Liga Nusantara club Pekanbaru.

== Club career ==
Born in 2004, Resa started his career in football in 2010 when he played at the Karangmalang FC Soccer School in Sragen Regency. The journey of his career led Resa to various opportunities to play football in interesting events. One of them was when he joined Persija Jakarta U20 who competed in the Elite Pro Academy in 2020. And his career quickly gained attention. One of them was when Dennis Wise and Des Walker, the two scouts of the fourth edition of Garuda Select, finally brought Resa to Europe in 2021.

=== Persija Jakarta ===
After returning from Garuda Select 4, he was included in the first team in the 2021–22 Liga 1 along with several other young players, such as Muhammad Ferarri, Alfriyanto Nico, Dony Tri Pamungkas, and others.

Until the 2023–24 season, he hasn't to get minutes at his club, and he will eventually be loaned out to another club.

==== Sriwijaya (loan) ====
In July 2023, Resa was signed for Sriwijaya to play in Liga 2 in the 2023–24 season, on loan from Persija Jakarta. He made his professional debut on 10 September 2023 in a 2–0 home win against Sada Sumut at the Gelora Sriwijaya Stadium, Palembang.

== International career ==
In February 2023, Resa was called up to the Indonesia U20 for the training centre in preparation for 2023 AFC U-20 Asian Cup. Resa made his international debut on 17 February 2023 in a friendly match against Fiji U20 at Gelora Bung Karno Stadium, Jakarta. Also scored his first international goal for national team in a 4–0 win.

== Career statistics ==
=== Club ===
As of 4 January 2026.

Club	Season	League			Cup		Continental		Other		Total	
Club	Season	Division	Apps	Goals	Apps	Goals	Apps	Goals	Apps	Goals	Apps	Goals
Persija Jakarta	2021–22	Liga 1	0	0	0	0	–		0	0	0	0
Persija Jakarta	2022–23	Liga 1	0	0	0	0	–		0	0	0	0
Sriwijaya (loan)	2023–24	Liga 2	11	0	0	0	–		0	0	11	0
Persiku Kudus (loan)	2024–25	Liga 2	3	0	0	0	–		0	0	3	0
Persikota Tangerang (loan)	2024–25	Liga 2	1	0	0	0	–		0	0	1	0
Pekanbaru	2025–26	Liga Nusantara	9	0	0	0	–		0	0	9	0
Career total			24	0	0	0	0	0	0	0	24	0

=== International goals ===
International under-20 goals

No.	Date	Venue	Opponent	Score	Result	Competition
1.	17 February 2023	Gelora Bung Karno Stadium, Jakarta, Indonesia	Fiji	3–0	4–0	2023 PSSI U-20 Mini Tournament

== Honours ==
=== International ===
Indonesia U-16

- AFF U-16 Youth Championship third place: 2019
