= Maciej Gajos =

Polish footballer

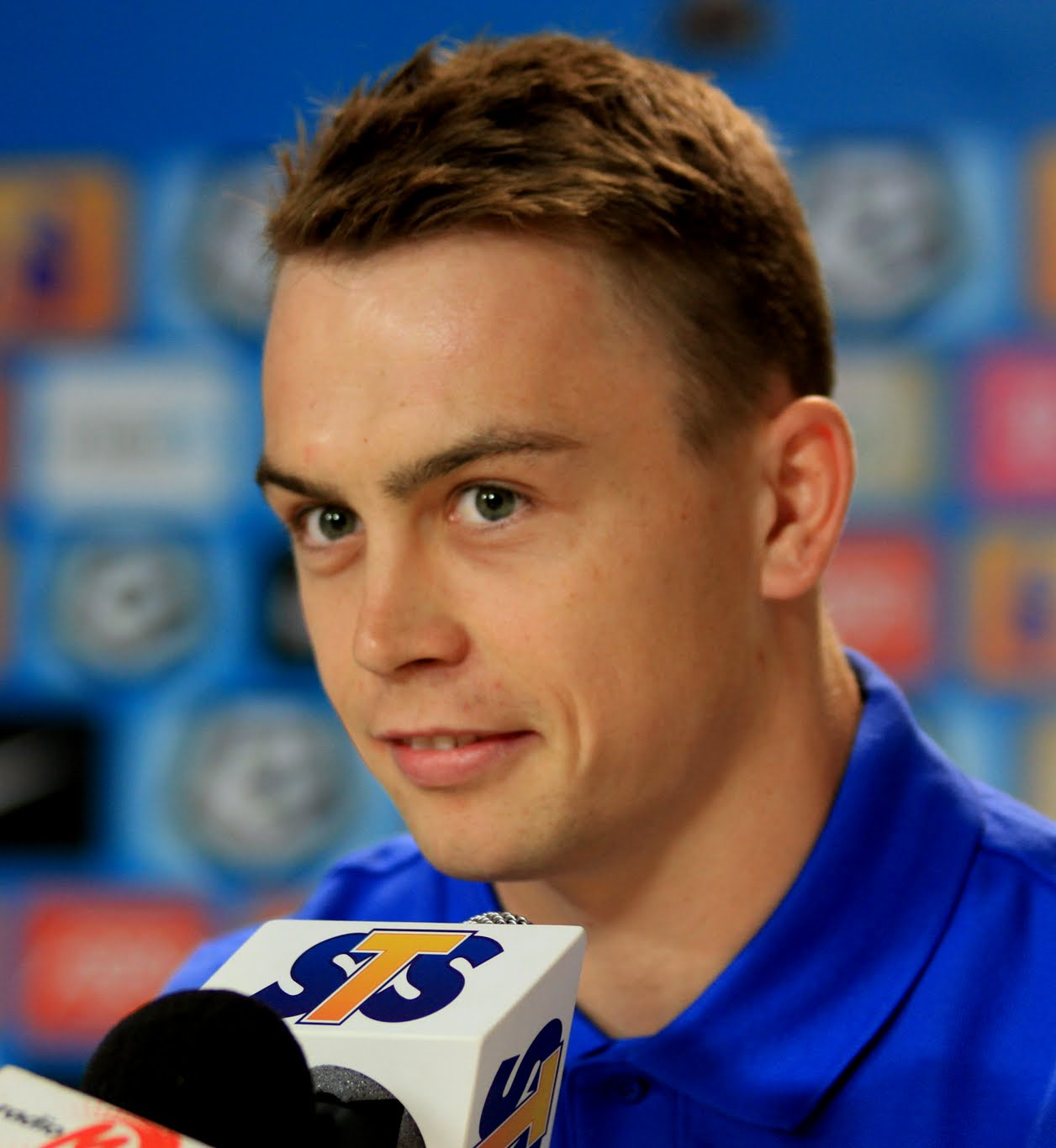
- Gajos with Lech Poznań in 2015

Personal information
- Full name: Maciej Jacek Gajos
- Date of birth: 19 March 1991 (age 35)
- Place of birth: Blachownia, Poland
- Height: 1.74 m (5 ft 9 in)
- Position: Midfielder

Youth career
- 2008: Raków Częstochowa

Senior career*
Years	Team	Apps	(Gls)
2008–2012	Raków Częstochowa	92	(19)
2012–2015	Jagiellonia Białystok	94	(18)
2015–2019	Lech Poznań	121	(16)
2019–2023	Lechia Gdańsk	118	(13)
2023–2025	Persija Jakarta	60	(8)
2025–2026	Wieczysta Kraków	25	(4)
2025	Wieczysta Kraków II	1	(0)
- * Club domestic league appearances and goals as of 21:39, 31 May 2026 (UTC)

Maciej Jacek Gajos (born 19 March 1991) is a Polish professional footballer who plays as a midfielder.

== International career ==
Gajos received his first call up to the Poland national team in November 2014, for a UEFA Euro 2016 qualifier against Georgia and a friendly against Switzerland, but did not make an appearance in either of them. He was included in the roster for another qualifier game against Republic of Ireland in March 2015, again remaining on the bench for its entirety.

== Career statistics ==
As of match played 31 May 2026

Appearances and goals by club, season and competition
Club	Season	League			National cup (Note: Includes Polish Cup)		Continental		Other		Total	
Club	Season	Division	Apps	Goals	Apps	Goals	Apps	Goals	Apps	Goals	Apps	Goals
Raków Częstochowa	2008–09	II liga	2	0	—		—		—		2	0
Raków Częstochowa	2009–10	II liga	25	1	1	0	—		—		26	1
Raków Częstochowa	2010–11	II liga	31	7	1	0	—		—		32	7
Raków Częstochowa	2011–12	II liga	34	11	1	0	—		—		35	11
Raków Częstochowa	Total		92	19	3	0	—		—		95	19
Jagiellonia Białystok	2012–13	Ekstraklasa	20	2	2	1	—		—		22	3
Jagiellonia Białystok	2013–14	Ekstraklasa	32	4	5	1	—		—		37	5
Jagiellonia Białystok	2014–15	Ekstraklasa	36	8	2	2	—		—		38	10
Jagiellonia Białystok	2015–16	Ekstraklasa	6	4	1	0	4 (Note: Appearances in UEFA Europa League)	1	—		11	5
Jagiellonia Białystok	Total		94	18	10	4	4	1	—		108	23
Lech Poznań	2015–16	Ekstraklasa	28	6	5	1	5	1	—		38	8
Lech Poznań	2016–17	Ekstraklasa	34	4	5	0	—		1 (Note: Appearance in Polish Super Cup)	0	40	4
Lech Poznań	2017–18	Ekstraklasa	33	4	1	0	5	0	—		39	4
Lech Poznań	2018–19	Ekstraklasa	26	2	2	0	6	0	—		34	2
Lech Poznań	Total		121	16	13	1	16	1	1	0	151	18
Lechia Gdańsk	2019–20	Ekstraklasa	30	3	5	2	1	0	1	0	37	5
Lechia Gdańsk	2020–21	Ekstraklasa	28	2	3	1	—		—		31	3
Lechia Gdańsk	2021–22	Ekstraklasa	31	4	1	1	—		—		32	5
Lechia Gdańsk	2022–23	Ekstraklasa	29	4	2	0	4 (Note: Appearances in UEFA Europa Conference League)	1	—		35	5
Lechia Gdańsk	Total		118	13	11	4	5	1	1	0	135	18
Persija Jakarta	2023–24	Liga 1	28	5	—		—		—		28	5
Persija Jakarta	2024–25	Liga 1	32	3	—		—		3 (Note: Appearances in Piala Presiden)	0	35	3
Persija Jakarta	Total		60	8	0	0	0	0	3	0	63	8
Wieczysta Kraków	2025–26	I liga	23	4	1	0	—		2 (Note: Appearances in I liga promotion play-offs)	0	26	4
Career total			508	78	38	9	25	3	7	0	578	90

== Honours ==
Lech Poznań

- Polish Super Cup: 2016

Lech Poznań II

- III liga, group II: 2018–19

Lechia Gdańsk

- Polish Super Cup: 2019

Wieczysta Kraków II

- IV liga Lesser Poland: 2025–26
