= Raka Cahyana =

Indonesian footballer

Personal information
- Full name: Raka Cahyana Rizky
- Date of birth: 24 February 2004 (age 22)
- Place of birth: Banyumas, Indonesia
- Height: 1.68 m (5 ft 6 in)
- Positions: Right-back; right winger

Team information
- Current team: PSIM Yogyakarta
- Number: 15

Youth career
- 2019–2021: Persija Jakarta

Senior career*
Years	Team	Apps	(Gls)
2021–2025	Persija Jakarta	11	(0)
2023–2024	→ Deltras (loan)	18	(0)
2025–	PSIM Yogyakarta	31	(1)

International career^{‡}
2019–2020	Indonesia U16	4	(1)
2022	Indonesia U20	5	(1)
2025–	Indonesia U23	4	(0)
- * Club domestic league appearances and goals as of 5 September 2026 ‡ National team caps and goals as of 8 December 2025

Raka Cahyana Rizky (born 24 February 2004) is an Indonesian professional footballer who plays as a right-back or right winger for Super League club PSIM Yogyakarta.

== Club career ==
=== Persija Jakarta ===
He was signed for Persija Jakarta to play in Liga 1 in the 2021 season. Cahyana made his first-team debut on 19 September 2021 in a match against Persipura Jayapura at the Indomilk Arena, Tangerang.

== International career ==
On 30 May 2022, Cahyana made his debut for an Indonesian youth team U-20 against a Venezuela U-20 squad in the 2022 Maurice Revello Tournament in France. And on June 2, in a match 2022 Maurice Revello Tournament against Ghana U20, Cahyana made his first international goal.

== Career statistics ==
=== Club ===
As of 5 September 2026

Club	Season	League			Cup		Other		Total	
Club	Season	Division	Apps	Goals	Apps	Goals	Apps	Goals	Apps	Goals
Persija Jakarta	2021–22	Liga 1	1	0	0	0	0	0	1	0
Persija Jakarta	2022–23	Liga 1	0	0	0	0	0	0	0	0
Persija Jakarta	2024–25	Liga 1	10	0	0	0	0	0	10	0
Deltras (loan)	2023–24	Liga 2	18	0	0	0	0	0	18	0
PSIM Yogyakarta	2025–26	Super League	30	1	0	0	0	0	30	1
PSIM Yogyakarta	2026–27	Super League	1	0	0	0	–		1	0
Career total			60	1	0	0	0	0	60	1

== Honours ==
Individual

- Liga 2 Team of the Season: 2023–24
- Super League Young Player of the Month: September 2025
