= Akbar Arjunsyah =

Indonesian footballer

Personal information
- Full name: Muhammad Akbar Arjunsyah
- Date of birth: 21 July 2001 (age 25)
- Place of birth: Sidoarjo, Indonesia
- Height: 1.75 m (5 ft 9 in)
- Position: Centre-back

Team information
- Current team: PSIS Semarang
- Number: 25

Youth career
- 2019–2020: Persebaya U20

Senior career*
Years	Team	Apps	(Gls)
2021	Persatu Tuban	6	(0)
2022–2023	Gresik United	7	(0)
2023–2025	Persija Jakarta	22	(2)
2025–2026	Dewa United Banten	0	(0)
2026	→ Persijap Jepara (loan)	4	(0)
2026–	PSIS Semarang	5	(1)
- * Club domestic league appearances and goals as of 7 November 2026

Muhammad Akbar Arjunsyah (born 21 July 2001) is an Indonesian professional footballer who plays as a centre-back for Championship club PSIS Semarang.

== Club career ==
=== Gresik United ===
Ahead of the 2022–23 Liga 2, Akbar signed a contract with Liga 2 club Gresik United. He made his league debut for Gresik United in a 0–0 draw over Persekat Tegal on 29 August 2022. On 27 September 2022, He marked his first win with Gresik United in a 2–0 win over Persipa Pati. In his first season with Gresik United, Akbar only went on to make 7 appearances, because Liga 2 was suspended due to a tragedy. Akbar chose to leave Gresik United after saying goodbye to management after his contract expired.

=== Persija Jakarta ===
On 17 April 2023, Akbar signed two-years contract with Liga 1 club Persija Jakarta. He officially became Persija Jakarta's first signing in 2023–24 season. Akbar made his league debut on 16 July 2023, coming on as a substituted, also scored his first league goal in 73rd minute in a 4–1 home win against Bhayangkara.

=== Dewa United Banten ===
In July 2025, Dewa United Banten announced the signing of Akbar.

==== Loan to Persijap Jepara ====
On 10 January 2026, Persijap Jepara announced that Akbar had joined on loan from Dewa United Banten for second half of the season.

== Career statistics ==
=== Club ===
As of 7 November 2026

Club	Season	League			Cup		Continental		Other (Note: Appearances in Indonesia President's Cup)		Total	
Club	Season	Division	Apps	Goals	Apps	Goals	Apps	Goals	Apps	Goals	Apps	Goals
Persatu Tuban	2021	Liga 3	6	0	0	0	–		0	0	6	0
Gresik United	2022–23	Liga 2	7	0	0	0	–		0	0	7	0
Persija Jakarta	2023–24	Liga 1	18	2	0	0	–		0	0	18	2
Persija Jakarta	2024–25	Liga 1	4	0	0	0	–		2	0	6	0
Dewa United	2025–26	Super League	0	0	0	0	–		0	0	0	0
Persijap Jepara (loan)	2025–26	Super League	4	0	0	0	–		0	0	4	0
PSIS Semarang	2026–27	Championship	5	1	0	0	–		0	0	5	1
Career total			44	3	0	0	0	0	2	0	46	3
