= Muhammad Ferarri =

Indonesian footballer

Personal information
- Full name: Muhammad Ferarri
- Date of birth: 21 June 2003 (age 23)
- Place of birth: Jakarta, Indonesia
- Height: 1.82 m (6 ft 0 in)
- Positions: Centre-back; right-back

Team information
- Current team: Bhayangkara Presisi
- Number: 41

Youth career
- 2018–2019: PS TIRA
- 2019–2020: Persija Jakarta

Senior career*
Years	Team	Apps	(Gls)
2021–2025	Persija Jakarta	71	(2)
2025–	Bhayangkara Presisi	14	(1)

International career^{‡}
2022–2023	Indonesia U20	20	(5)
2023–2025	Indonesia U23	25	(2)
2022–	Indonesia	8	(2)
Medal record
Men's football
Representing Indonesia
Southeast Asian Games
Gold medal – first place	2023 Cambodia	Team
AFF U-23 Championship
Runner-up	2023 Thailand	Team
Runner-up	2025 Indonesia	Team
- * Club domestic league appearances and goals as of 23 May 2026 ‡ National team caps and goals as of 12 December 2025

Muhammad Ferarri (born 21 June 2003) is an Indonesian professional footballer who plays as a defender for Super League club Bhayangkara Presisi and the Indonesia national team.

== Club career ==
=== Persija Jakarta ===
Ferarri made his first-team debut for Persija Jakarta on 24 September 2021 in a match against Persela Lamongan at the Pakansari Stadium in the 2021 Liga 1 season.

== International career ==
On 30 May 2022, Ferarri made his debut for the Indonesian U-20 team against Venezuela at the 2022 Maurice Revello Tournament in France.

On 10 July 2022, Ferarri scored a brace against Myanmar U-20 in the 2022 AFF U-19 Youth Championship in a 5–1 win.

On 18 September 2022, Ferarri captained the national under-20 football team in a 3–2 win at the 2023 AFC U-20 Asian Cup qualification against the Vietnam U-20. He scored an own-goal to bring the tie 1-1, and later equalized with a header to bring the score at 2-2. Indonesia eventually won 3-2 and qualified for the 2023 AFC U-20 Asian Cup as Group F Winner in the 2023 AFC U-20 Asian Cup qualification.

In September 2022, Ferarri received a call up to the senior team for a friendly match against Curacao. On 27 September 2022, Ferrari made his first senior cap in a 2–1 win.

In November 2022, it was reported that Ferarri received a call-up from the Indonesia for a training camp, in preparation for the 2022 AFF Championship.

On 25 November 2024, Ferarri received a called up to the preliminary squad to the Indonesia national team for the 2024 ASEAN Championship.

== Career statistics ==
=== Club ===
As of 23 May 2026.

Club	Season	League			Cup		Continental		Other		Total	
Club	Season	Division	Apps	Goals	Apps	Goals	Apps	Goals	Apps	Goals	Apps	Goals
Persija Jakarta	2021–22	Liga 1	7	0	0	0	–		0	0	7	0
Persija Jakarta	2022–23	Liga 1	23	0	0	0	–		0	0	23	0
Persija Jakarta	2023–24	Liga 1	18	2	0	0	–		0	0	18	2
Persija Jakarta	2024–25	Liga 1	23	0	0	0	–		4 (Note: Appearances in Indonesia President's Cup)	0	27	0
Bhayangkara Presisi	2025–26	Super League	14	1	0	0	–		0	0	14	1
Career total			85	3	0	0	0	0	4	0	89	3

=== International ===
As of match played 21 December 2024

Indonesia national team
Year	Apps	Goals
2022	1	0
2024	7	2
Total	8	2

=== International goals ===
International under-20 goals

No.	Date	Venue	Opponent	Score	Result	Competition
1.	10 July 2022	Patriot Candrabhaga Stadium, Bekasi, Indonesia	Myanmar	1–1	5–1	2022 AFF U-19 Youth Championship
2.	10 July 2022	Patriot Candrabhaga Stadium, Bekasi, Indonesia	Myanmar	3–1	5–1	2022 AFF U-19 Youth Championship
3.	17 September 2022	Gelora Bung Tomo Stadium, Surabaya, Indonesia	Vietnam	2–2	3–2	2023 AFC U-20 Asian Cup qualification
4.	1 November 2022	Antalya Atatürk Stadium, Manavgat, Turkey	Moldova	2–1	3–1	Friendly
5.	19 February 2023	Gelora Bung Karno Stadium, Jakarta, Indonesia	New Zealand	1–2	1–2	2023 PSSI U-20 Mini Tournament

International under-23 goals

Goal	Date	Venue	Opponent	Score	Result	Competition
1.	13 May 2023	Olympic Stadium, Phnom Penh, Cambodia	Vietnam	2–1	3–2	2023 Southeast Asian Games
2.	24 August 2023	Rayong Province Stadium, Rayong, Thailand	Thailand	2–0	3–1	2023 AFF U-23 Championship

International senior goals

As of match played 12 December 2024

List of international goals scored by Muhammad Ferarri
No.	Date	Venue	Cap	Opponent	Score	Result	Competition
1	12 December 2024	Manahan Stadium, Surakarta, Indonesia	6	Laos	2–2	3–3	2024 ASEAN Championship
5	12 December 2024	Manahan Stadium, Surakarta, Indonesia	6	Laos	3–2	3–3	2024 ASEAN Championship

== Honours ==
Persija Jakarta

- Menpora Cup: 2021

Indonesia U23

- SEA Games gold medal: 2023
- AFF U-23 Championship runner-up: 2023, 2025

Individual

- Liga 1 Young Player of the Month: August 2022
