= 2022–23 Persija Jakarta season =

Persija Jakarta
2022-23 season
- Owner: PT Persija Jaya Jakarta
- President: Mohamad Prapanca
- Manager: Thomas Jens Uwe Doll (since 23 April 2022)
- Stadium: Jakarta International Stadium; Patriot Chandrabhaga Stadium; Gelora Bung Karno Main Stadium
- Liga 1: 2nd
- Top goalscorer: League: Michael Krmenčík (10); All: Michael Krmenčík (10)
- Highest home attendance: 60,134 (vs PSS Sleman, 16 April 2023, Liga 1)
- Lowest home attendance: 0 (vs Borneo F.C. Samarinda, 6 December 2022, Liga 1) (vs Persik Kediri, 10 December 2022, Liga 1) (vs Persebaya Surabaya, 16 December 2022, Liga 1) (vs Dewa United F.C., 20 December 2022, Liga 1) (vs PSIS Semarang, 16 March 2023, Liga 1)
- Average home league attendance: 17,824
- Biggest win: 5-0 (vs PSS Sleman (H), 16 April 2023, Liga 1)
- Biggest defeat: 3-1 (vs Borneo F.C. Samarinda (A), 8 March 2023, Liga 1); 2–0 (vs PSIS Semarang (A), 13 December 2022, Liga 1)
Home colours	Away colours	Third colours

The 2022–23 season is Persija's 89th competitive season. They have not been relegated since the Perserikatan competition started in 1933. This season is Persija's 28th consecutive seasons in top-flight since professional competition formed on 1994. The season covers the period from 1 June 2022 to 31 May 2023.

== Kits ==
Home	Away	Third	Third alt.

== Coaching staff ==
Position	Staff
Manager	(Germany) Thomas Jens Uwe Doll
Assistant Coach	(Italy) Pasquale Domenico Rocco
Goalkeeper Coach	(Czech Republic) Jan Klima
Fitness Coach	(Cyprus) Paul Keenan
Interpreter	(Indonesia) Sopian Hadi
Assistant Manager	(Indonesia) Vava Hernandia
Team Doctor	(Indonesia) dr. Donny Kurniawan, Sp.KO
Physiotherapist	(Indonesia) Muhamad Yanizar Lubis (Indonesia) Jeremiah Halomoan S
Masseur	(Indonesia) Aditya Julistiawan (Indonesia) Akhmad Aditya Subkhi
Kitman	(Indonesia) Abdul Rahman Saleh (Indonesia) Candra Darmawan

=== Management ===
Chief Executive Officer	(Indonesia) Ambono Januarianto
President	(Indonesia) Mohammad Prapanca
Vice President	(Indonesia) Ganesha Putera
Financial Director	(Indonesia) Koko Afiat
Sporting Director	(Indonesia) Ferry Paulus
Business Director	(Indonesia) Ivi Sumarna Suryana
Match Organizing Committee	(Indonesia) Haen Rahmawan
Club Secretary	(Indonesia) M. Araaf Sidik
Media Manager	(Indonesia) Yudhistira Achmad
Media Officer	(Indonesia) M. Nadhil
Photographer	(Indonesia) Khairul Imam
Ground (capacity and dimensions)	Jakarta International Stadium (82,000 / 105x68 metres); Gelora Bung Karno (77,193 / 105x68 metres)
Training Ground	Nirwana Park Sawangan

== New contracts ==
No.	Pos	Player/Staff	Contract length	Contract end	Date	Source
56	DF	(Indonesia) Maman Abdurrahman	1 year	31 March 2023	13 April 2022	
6	DF	(Indonesia) Tony Sucipto	1 year	31 March 2023	13 April 2022	
46	MF	(Indonesia) Osvaldo Ardiles Haay	1 year	30 June 2023	17 April 2022	
	Manager	(Germany) Thomas Jens Uwe Doll	2 years	30 June 2025	25 March 2023	
41	DF	(Indonesia) Muhammad Ferarri	2 years	30 June 2025	25 March 2023	
11	DF	(Indonesia) Firza Andika	2 years	30 June 2025	25 March 2023	
24	MF	(Indonesia) Resky Fandi Witriawan	2 years	30 June 2025	25 March 2023	
77	MF	(Indonesia) Dony Tri Pamungkas	2 years	30 June 2025	25 March 2023	
26	GK	(Indonesia) Andritany Ardhiyasa	3 Years	30 June 2026	25 March 2023	
25	MF	(Indonesia) Riko Simanjuntak	3 Years	30 June 2026	25 March 2023	

== Transfers ==
=== In ===
==== First round ====
No.	Pos	Player	Transferred From	Fee	Date	Source
11	LB	(Indonesia) Firza Andika	(Indonesia) Persikabo 1973	Free	3 April 2022	
19	DM	(Indonesia) Hanif Sjahbandi	(Indonesia) Arema F.C.	Free	3 April 2022	
23	CB	(Indonesia) Hansamu Yama Pranata	(Indonesia) Bhayangkara Solo F.C.	Free	6 April 2022	
13	LB	(Indonesia) Barnabas Sobor	(Indonesia) Persewangi Banyuwangi	Free	1 May 2022	
98	CF	(Indonesia) Ricky Ricardo Cristian G. T. Cawor	(Indonesia) Persipura Jayapura	Free	13 May 2022	
17	CB	(Czech Republic) Ondřej Kúdela	(Czech Republic) SK Slavia Prague	Free	8 June 2022	
27	CF	(Czech Republic) Michael Krmenčík	(Belgium) Club Brugge KV	Rp 29m	22 June 2022	
10	CM	(Germany) Hanno Behrens	(Germany) Hansa Rostock	Rp 3.48m	4 July 2022	
9	CF	(Bahrain) Abdulla Yusuf Abdulrahim Mohamed Helal	(Czech Republic) SK Slavia Prague	Free	20 July 2022	

==== Second round ====
No.	Pos	Player	Transferred From	Fee	Date	Source
55	CB	(Indonesia) Dandi Maulana Abdulhak	(Indonesia) Persebaya Surabaya	TBA	4 January 2023	
28	RB	(Indonesia) Ahmad Birrul Walidain	(Indonesia) Madura United F.C.	TBA	6 January 2023	
99	FW	(Indonesia) Aji Kusuma	(Indonesia) Persiba Balikpapan	TBA	12 January 2023	
35	DF	(Indonesia) Rahmat Nicko	(Indonesia) Karo United F.C.	TBA	30 January 2023	
78	FW	(Indonesia) Witan Sulaeman	(Slovakia) AS Trenčín	TBA	31 January 2023	

=== Out ===
==== First round ====
No.	Pos	Player	Transferred To	Fee	Date	Source
70	RWF	(Indonesia) Irfan Jauhari	(Indonesia) Persis Solo	End of Loan	2 April 2022	
24	DMF	(Indonesia) Ichsan Kurniawan	(Indonesia) Dewa United F.C.	Released	17 April 2022	
11	LWF	(Indonesia) Novri Setiawan	(Indonesia) Bali United F.C.	Released	17 April 2022	
23	GK	(Indonesia) Yoewanto Setya Beny	(Indonesia) Sriwijaya F.C.	Released	19 April 2022	
29	GK	(Indonesia) Adixi Lenzivio	(Indonesia) PSMS Medan	Released	19 April 2022	
16	DMF	(Indonesia) Ahmad Bustomi	(Indonesia) PSMS Medan	Released	20 April 2022	
94	DMF	(Indonesia) Iman Fathuroman	(Indonesia) Persikab Kabupaten Bandung	Released	20 April 2022	
45	CB	(Indonesia) Ikhwan Ciptady	(Indonesia) Persis Solo	Released	20 April 2022	
78	CB	(Indonesia) Hadi Ardiansyah	(Indonesia) PSKC Cimahi	Released	25 April 2022	
47	RB	(Italy) Marco Motta	Free agent	Released	25 April 2022	
9	CF	(Croatia) Marko Šimić	(Croatia) NK Istra 1961	Mutual Consent	26 April 2022	
7	AMF	(Indonesia) Rizki Ramdani Lestaluhu	(Indonesia) Bali United F.C.	Undisclosed	8 May 2022	
31	LB	(Indonesia) Samuel Christianson Simanjuntak	(Indonesia) PSM Makassar	Undisclosed	15 May 2022	
32	DMF	(Nepal) Rohit Chand Thakuri	(Indonesia) Persik Kediri	Released	21 May 2022	
10	AMF	(Mali) Makan Konate	(Indonesia) RANS Nusantara F.C.	Undisclosed	16 June 2022	
81	DMF	(Indonesia) Adrianus Dwiki Arya Poernomo	(Indonesia) Persela Lamongan	Released	28 July 2022	
13	CF	(Indonesia) Rafli Mursalim	(Indonesia) Persegres Gresik United	Released	2 August 2022	
14	RB	(Indonesia) Ismed Sofyan	Retired	Retired	11 August 2022	

==== Second round ====
No.	Pos	Player	Transferred To	Fee	Date	Source
69	LB	(Indonesia) Rangga Widiansyah	(Indonesia) Persik Kediri	Released	4 January 2023	
4	CB	(Indonesia) Ryuji Utomo	(Indonesia) Bali United F.C.	Released	6 January 2023	
40	CB	(Indonesia) Al Hamra Hehanusa	(Indonesia) Persik Kediri	Released	6 January 2023	
89	CF	(Indonesia) Taufik Hidayat	(Indonesia) Madura United F.C.	Released	9 January 2023	
98	CF	(Indonesia) Ricky Ricardo Cristian G. T. Cawor	(Indonesia) PSS Sleman	Released	10 January 2023	
7	LB	(Indonesia) Muhammad Rezaldi Hehanusa	(Indonesia) Persib Bandung	Released	26 January 2023	
80	AMF	(Indonesia) Braif Fatari	(Indonesia) Persik Kediri	Released	30 January 2023	

=== Loan In ===
No.	Pos	Player	Loaned From	Start	End	Source

=== Loan Out ===
No.	Pos	Name	Loaned to	Start	End	Source
	CB	(Indonesia) Barnabas Sobor	(Indonesia) PSPS Riau	26 July 2022	24 March 2023	
5	CB	(Indonesia) Otávio Dutra	(Indonesia) Madura United F.C.	30 January 2023	End of Season	
	CB	(Indonesia) Barnabas Sobor	(Lithuania) FK Riteriai	25 March 2023	31 December 2023	

== Squad information ==
=== First team squad ===
No.	Name	Nat.	Date of birth (age)	Signed in	Contract until	Signed from	Transfer Fee	Notes
Goalkeepers
22	Risky Muhammad Sudirman	(Indonesia)	2 February 2002 (age 24)	2019				Under-23 Player; Originally from Youth system
26	Andritany Ardhiyasa	(Indonesia)	26 December 1991 (age 34)	2010		(Indonesia) Sriwijaya		Captain
31	Adre Adrido Greovani	(Indonesia)	13 August 2004 (age 22)	2022		(Indonesia) Persija Jakarta U-21	Free	Under-23 Player; Originally from Youth system
99	Cahya Supriadi	(Indonesia)	11 February 2003 (age 23)	2021		(Indonesia) Persija Jakarta U-21	Free	Under-23 Player; Originally from Youth system
Defenders
2	Ilham Rio Fahmi	(Indonesia)	6 October 2001 (age 25)	2021	30 June 2025	(Indonesia) Persija Jakarta U-21	Free	Under-23 player Originally from Youth system
6	Tony Sucipto	(Indonesia)	12 February 1986 (age 40)	2019	31 March 2023	(Indonesia) Persib Bandung		
11	Firza Andika	(Indonesia)	11 May 1999 (age 27)	2022	31 March 2023	(Indonesia) Persikabo 1973	Free	
17	Ondřej Kúdela	(Czech Republic)	26 March 1987 (age 39)	2022		(Czech Republic) SK Slavia Prague	Free	Foreign Player
23	Hansamu Yama Pranata	(Indonesia)	16 January 1995 (age 31)	2022	31 March 2023	(Indonesia) Bhayangkara Solo F.C.	Free	
24	Resky Fandi Witriawan	(Indonesia)	6 September 1999 (age 27)	2022	31 December 2024	(Indonesia) PSIS Semarang	End of Loan at 2022	Under-23 player Originally from Youth system
28	Ahmad Birrul Walidain	(Indonesia)	14 December 1995 (age 30)	2023		(Indonesia) Madura United F.C.	TBA	
35	Rachmat Nicko	(Indonesia)	14 July 2000 (age 26)	2023		(Indonesia) Karo United F.C.		Under-23 player
41	Muhammad Ferarri	(Indonesia)	21 June 2003 (age 23)	2021		(Indonesia) Persija Jakarta U-21	Free	Under-23 player Originally from Youth system
55	Dandi Maulana Abdulhak	(Indonesia)	17 June 1998 (age 28)	2023		(Indonesia) Persebaya Surabaya	TBA	
56	Maman Abdurrahman	(Indonesia)	12 May 1982 (age 44)	2015	31 March 2023	(Indonesia) Persita Tangerang		
90	Fava Sheva Rustanto	(Indonesia)	6 April 2005 (age 21)	2023		(Indonesia) Persija Jakarta U-21	Free	Under-23 Player; Originally from Youth system
96	Moh. Arya Salim	(Indonesia)	14 November 2002 (age 23)	2023		(Indonesia) Persija Jakarta U-21	Free	Under-23 Player; Originally from Youth system
Midfielders
8	Syahrian Abimanyu	(Indonesia)	25 April 1999 (age 27)	2022	30 June 2024	(Malaysia) Johor Darul Ta'zim F.C.	Free	
10	Hanno Behrens	(Germany)	26 March 1990 (age 36)	2022	2025	(Germany) Hansa Rostock	Rp 3.48m	Foreign Player
19	Hanif Sjahbandi	(Indonesia)	7 April 1997 (age 29)	2022	31 March 2024	(Indonesia) Arema F.C.	Free	
25	Riko Simanjuntak	(Indonesia)	26 January 1992 (age 34)	2018	2019	(Indonesia) Semen Padang	Free	
45	Raka Cahyana Rizky	(Indonesia)	24 February 2004 (age 22)	2021		(Indonesia) Persija Jakarta U-21	Free	Under-23 player Originally from Youth system
58	Frengky Deaner Missa	(Indonesia)	20 February 2004 (age 22)	2022		(Indonesia) Persija Jakarta U-21	Free	Under-23 player Originally from Youth system
77	Dony Tri Pamungkas	(Indonesia)	11 January 2005 (age 21)	2021			Free	Under-23 Player; Originally from Youth system
78	Witan Sulaeman	(Indonesia)	8 October 2001 (age 25)	2023	30 June 2026	(Slovakia) AS Trencin		Under-23 Player
85	Sandi Arta Samosir	(Indonesia)	8 January 2002 (age 24)	2023		(Indonesia) Persija Jakarta U-21	Free	Under-23 player Originally from Youth system
94	Achmad Maulana	(Indonesia)	24 April 2003 (age 23)	2023		(Indonesia) Persija Jakarta U-21	Free	Under-23 Player; Originally from Youth system
Forwards
9	Abdulla Yusuf Abdulrahim Mohamed Helal	(Bahrain)	12 June 1993 (age 33)	2022	2025	(Czech Republic) SK Slavia Prague	Free	Foreign Player
21	Alfriyanto Nico	(Indonesia)	3 April 2003 (age 23)	2021			Free	Under-23 Player; Originally from Youth system
27	Michael Krmenčík	(Czech Republic)	15 March 1993 (age 33)	2022	2025	(Belgium) Club Brugge KV	Free	Foreign Player
46	Osvaldo Ardiles Haay	(Indonesia)	17 May 1997 (age 29)	2020		(Indonesia) Persebaya Surabaya	Free	
99	Aji Kusuma	(Indonesia)	30 January 1999 (age 27)	2023	2024	(Indonesia) Persiba Balikpapan	TBC	Under-23 Player

== Pre-season ==
Win Draw Loss

=== Friendly Matches ===
5 June 2022 Friendly	Persija Jakarta	1–2	(Malaysia) Sabah F.C.	Bekasi, West Java
16.00 (UTC+7)	Taufik 60'	Report	Neto 3'; Tae-soo 63'	Stadium: Patriot Chandrabhaga Stadium; Referee: Musthofa Umarella (East Jakarta)

12 June 2022 Friendly	Persija Jakarta	5–1	Persija Jakarta U-21	Depok, West Java
15.30 (UTC+7)				Stadium: NYTC Sawangan

17 June 2022 Friendly	Persija Jakarta	10–0	Persipu Depok	Depok, West Java
15.30 (UTC+7)		Report		Stadium: NYTC Sawangan

9 July 2022 Friendly	Persija Jakarta	6–1	Munial Sports Group	South Jakarta, Jakarta
15.30 (UTC+7)	Riko; Cawor; Frengky; Braif; Krmenčík (pen.)	Report		Stadium: PTIK Stadium

16 July 2022 Friendly	Persija Jakarta	4–2	RANS Nusantara F.C.	Cikarang, West Java
15.00 (UTC+7)	Krmenčík 7'; Behrens 27', 39'; Kúdela 59' (pen.)		Alfin 15'; Septian 49'	Stadium: Wibawa Mukti Stadium; Referee: Nusur Fadillah (Central Jakarta)

24 July 2022 Friendly	Persija Jakarta	3–3	(Thailand) Chonburi F.C.	North Jakarta, Jakarta
18.45 (UTC+7)	Taufik 13'; Riko 41', 88'		Byung-soo 17', 25'; Danilo 69'	Stadium: Jakarta International Stadium; Referee: Thoriq Munir Alkatiri (Bandung)

8 October 2022 Friendly	Persija Jakarta	3–1	Bhayangkara F.C.	Bojongsari, Depok, West Java
08.00 (UTC+7)	Krmenčík; Riko; Kúdela	Report	Ezzejjari	Stadium: Nirwana Park; Attendance: 0

5 November 2022 Friendly	Persija Jakarta	2–0	RANS Nusantara F.C.	Bojongsari, Depok, West Java
15.00 (UTC+7)	Riko			Stadium: Nirwana Park; Referee: TBA

19 November 2022 Friendly	Persija Jakarta	2–1	F.C. Bekasi City	Central Jakarta, Jakarta
15.00 (UTC+7)	Behrens; Riko		Goal	Stadium: Gelora Bung Karno Madya Stadium; Referee: TBA

=== 2022 Indonesia President's Cup ===
==== Group stage ====
Pos	Team	Pld	W	D	L	GF	GA	GD	Pts	Qualification
1	Borneo Samarinda (H, A)	4	3	1	0	6	1	+5	10	Knockout stage
2	Barito Putera (A)	4	1	3	0	4	2	+2	6	Knockout stage
3	RANS Nusantara	4	1	2	1	6	5	+1	5	
4	Madura United	4	1	2	1	3	3	0	5	
5	Persija	4	0	0	4	3	11	−8	0	

Source: Piala Presiden
Rules for classification: 1) Points; 2) Head-to-head; 3) Goal difference; 4) Goals scored.
(A) Advance to a further round; (H) Hosts

18 June 2022 2019 Indonesia President's Cup Group B	Persija Jakarta	0–2	PS Barito Putera	Samarinda, East Kalimantan
21:30 (UTC+8)		Report	Ryota 70'; Rafa 85'	Stadium: Segiri Stadium; Attendance: 2,553; Referee: Yeni Krisdianto (Tulungagung)

22 June 2022 2019 Indonesia President's Cup Group B	RANS Nusantara F.C.	5–1	Persija Jakarta	Samarinda, East Kalimantan
21:30 (UTC+8)	Septian 15'; Edo 44'; Iida 57'; David 69'; C. Gonzáles 85' (pen.)	Report	Miyazaki 89'	Stadium: Segiri Stadium; Attendance: 1,446; Referee: Gideon F. Dapaherang (East Jakarta)

25 June 2022 2019 Indonesia President's Cup Group B	Persija Jakarta	1–2	Borneo F.C. Samarinda	Samarinda, East Kalimantan
21:30 (UTC+8)	Rio Fahmi 22'	Report	Lilipaly 45+3'; Pato 73'	Stadium: Segiri Stadium; Attendance: 7,225; Referee: Yeni Krisdianto (Tulungagung)

28 June 2022 2019 Indonesia President's Cup Group B	Madura United F.C.	2–1	Persija Jakarta	Samarinda, East Kalimantan
21:30 (UTC+8)	Beto 45+3'; Cleberson 79'	Report	Frengky 89'	Stadium: Segiri Stadium; Attendance: 1,236; Referee: Agus Fauzan Arifin (Sleman)

== Competitions ==
=== Overview ===
Competition	Record								Started round	Final position / round	First match	Last match
Competition	G	W	D	L	GF	GA	GD	Win %	Started round	Final position / round	First match	Last match
Liga 1	34	20	6	8	47	27	+20	58.82	Matchday 1	Matchday 34	23 July 2022	15 April 2023
Piala Indonesia	0	0	0	0	0	0	+0	—	Round 1	TBA	TBA	TBA
Total	34	20	6	8	47	27	+20	58.82				

Updated to match played 16 April 2023
Source: Competitions

=== Liga 1 ===

Persija XI BRI Liga 1 2022–23

==== League table ====
Pos	Team	Pld	W	D	L	GF	GA	GD	Pts	Qualification or relegation
1	PSM (C)	34	22	9	3	63	28	+35	75	Qualification for the additional play-offs for AFC Club Competition and Qualification for the 2023–24 AFC Cup Play-Offs
2	Persija	34	20	6	8	47	27	+20	66	
3	Persib	34	19	5	10	54	50	+4	62	
4	Borneo Samarinda	34	16	9	9	64	40	+24	57	
5	Bali United	34	16	6	12	67	53	+14	54	Qualification for the additional play-offs for AFC Club Competition and Qualification for the 2023–24 AFC Champions League Preliminary Round 1

Source: BRI Liga 1 2022–23
Rules for classification: 1) Points; 2) Head-to-head points; 3) Head-to-head goal difference; 4) Head-to-head goals scored; 5) Head-to-head away goals scored; 6) Goal difference; 7) Goals scored; 8) Fair-play points; 9) Draw.
(C) Champions

==== Results summary ====
Overall								Home						Away					
Pld	W	D	L	GF	GA	GD	Pts	W	D	L	GF	GA	GD	W	D	L	GF	GA	GD
34	20	6	8	47	27	+20	66	14	3	0	34	12	+22	6	3	8	13	15	−2

Last updated: 16 April 2023.
Source: Competitive matches

==== Results by matchday ====
Matchday	1	2	3	4	5	6	7	8	9	10	11	12	13	14	15	16	17	18	19	20	21	22	23	24	25	26	27	28	29	30	31	32	33	34
Ground	A	H	A	A	A	H	A	H	A	H	H	H	A	H	H	A	A	H	A	H	H	H	H	A	H	A	A	A	H	A	H	A	A	H
Result	L	W	D	D	W	W	W	W	W	D	W	D	L	D	W	W	L	W	L	W	W	W	W	L	W	D	L	L	W	L	W	W	W	W
Position	14	6	9	10	7	6	6	5	4	4	3	5	5	5	5	4	5	3	4	2	2	2	3	2	3	3	3	3	3	3	3	3	2	2

Updated to match(es) played on 16 April 2023. Source: Matches
A = Away; H = Home; W = Win; D = Draw; L = Loss; P = Postponed

==== Matches ====
Win Draw Loss

===== First Round =====
23 July 2022 1	Bali United F.C.	1–0	Persija Jakarta	Gianyar, Bali
21:00 UTC+8	Pacheco 39'	Report		Stadium: Kapten I Wayan Dipta Stadium; Attendance: 11,022; Referee: Fariq Hitaba (Yogyakarta)

31 July 2022 2	Persija Jakarta	2–1	Persis Solo	Bekasi, West Java
15:30 UTC+7	Behrens 15'; Frengky 44'	Report	Samsul 48'	Stadium: Patriot Chandrabhaga Stadium; Attendance: 27,109; Referee: Steven Yubel Poli (Manado)

5 August 2022 3	PSM Makassar	1–1	Persija Jakarta	Parepare, South Sulawesi
17:00 UTC+8	Kenzo 75'	Report	Behrens 78'	Stadium: Gelora B.J. Habibie Stadium; Attendance: 18,236; Referee: Iwan Sukoco (Malang)

14 August 2022 4	Persikabo 1973	1–1	Persija Jakarta	Cibinong, Bogor Regency, West Java
20:30 UTC+7	Krmenčík 42'	Report	Kúdela 45+3' (o.g.)	Stadium: Pakansari Stadium; Attendance: 13,704; Referee: Aprisman Aranda (Padangpanjang)

20 August 2022 5	RANS Nusantara F.C.	0–3	Persija Jakarta	Cibinong, Bogor Regency, West Java
20:30 UTC+7		Report	Behrens 14'; Yusuf Helal 37', 40'	Stadium: Pakansari Stadium; Attendance: 9,857; Referee: Faulur Rosy (Banda Aceh)

24 August 2022 6	Persija Jakarta	1–0	Persita Tangerang	Bekasi, West Java
20:00 UTC+7	Yusuf Helal 90+2' (pen.)	Report		Stadium: Patriot Chandrabhaga Stadium; Attendance: 25,168; Referee: Agus Fauzan Arifin (Sleman)

28 August 2022 7	Arema F.C.	0–1	Persija Jakarta	Kepanjen, Malang Regency, East Java
20:30 UTC+7		Report	Krmenčík 45'	Stadium: Kanjuruhan Stadium; Attendance: 38,155; Referee: Thoriq Munir Alkatiri (Bandung)

3 September 2022 8	Persija Jakarta	2–1	Bhayangkara F.C.	Bekasi, West Java
20:30 UTC+7	Krmenčík 13', 56'	Report	Dendy 11'	Stadium: Patriot Chandrabhaga Stadium; Attendance: 27,791; Referee: Muhammad Khisfan (Bengkulu)

11 September 2022 9	PS Barito Putera	0–1	Persija Jakarta	Martapura, South Kalimantan
21:00 UTC+8		Report	Krmenčík 69'	Stadium: Demang Lehman Stadium; Attendance: 6,613; Referee: Asep Yandis (Karawang)

17 September 2022 10	Persija Jakarta	0–0	Madura United F.C.	Bekasi, West Java
20:30 UTC+7		Report		Stadium: Patriot Chandrabhaga Stadium; Attendance: 27,883; Referee: Ginanjar Rahman Latief (Soreang)

2 October 2022 11 (Postponed)	Persib Bandung	Postponed	Persija Jakarta	Bandung, West Java
16:00 UTC+7		Report		Stadium: Gelora Bandung Lautan Api Stadium
Note: Persib Bandung hosted Persija Jakarta at Gelora Bandung Lautan Api Stadium on 2 October. Because football riots in Malang during the Arema F.C. vs Persebaya Surabaya match.

8 October 2022 12 (Postponed)	Persija Jakarta	Postponed	Borneo F.C. Samarinda	Bekasi, West Java
20:30 UTC+7		Report		Stadium: Patriot Chandrabhaga Stadium
Note: Persija Jakarta will hosted Borneo F.C. Samarinda at Patriot Chandrabhaga Stadium on 8 October. League suspended pending investigation of the Kanjuruhan Stadium disaster and Improvements to the Safety and Security System at the Stadium.

15 October 2022 13 (Postponed)	Persija Jakarta	Postponed	Persik Kediri	Bekasi, West Java
20:30 UTC+7		Report		Stadium: Patriot Chandrabhaga Stadium
Note: Persija Jakarta will hosted Persik Kediri at Patriot Chandrabhaga Stadium on 15 October. League suspended pending investigation of the Kanjuruhan Stadium disaster and Improvements to the Safety and Security System at the Stadium.

22 October 2022 14 (Postponed)	PSIS Semarang	Postponed	Persija Jakarta	Semarang, Central Java
20:30 UTC+7		Report		Stadium: Jatidiri Stadium
Note: PSIS Semarang will hosted Persija Jakarta at Jatidiri Stadium on 22 October. League suspended pending investigation of the Kanjuruhan Stadium disaster and Improvements to the Safety and Security System at the Stadium.

30 October 2022 15 (Postponed)	Persija Jakarta	Postponed	Persebaya Surabaya	North Jakarta, Jakarta
20:00 UTC+7		Report		Stadium: Jakarta International Stadium
Note: Persija Jakarta will hosted Persebaya Surabaya at Jakarta International Stadium on 30 October. League suspended pending investigation of the Kanjuruhan Stadium disaster and Improvements to the Safety and Security System at the Stadium.

6 November 2022 16 (Postponed)	Persija Jakarta	Postponed	Dewa United F.C.	Bekasi, West Java
20:30 UTC+7		Report		Stadium: Patriot Chandrabhaga Stadium

13 November 2022 17 (Postponed)	PSS Sleman	Postponed	Persija Jakarta	Sleman, Special Region of Yogyakarta
20:30 UTC+7		Report		Stadium: Maguwoharjo Stadium

===== Second Round =====
20 November 2022 18 (Postponed)	Persija Jakarta	Postponed	Bali United F.C.	North Jakarta, Jakarta
20:30 UTC+7		Report		Stadium: Jakarta International Stadium

6 December 2022 12 (Reschedule)	Persija Jakarta	1–0	Borneo F.C. Samarinda	Bantul, Special Region of Yogyakarta
18:30 UTC+7	Firza 55'	Report		Stadium: Sultan Agung Stadium; Attendance: 0 Referee: Yeni Krisdianto (Tulungagung)

10 December 2022 13 (Reschedule)	Persija Jakarta	1–1	Persik Kediri	Semarang, Central Java
18:15 UTC+7	Riko 43'	Report	Renan 9'	Stadium: Jatidiri Stadium; Attendance: 0 Referee: Darma Santoso Gulo (Medan)

13 December 2022 14 (Reschedule)	PSIS Semarang	2–0	Persija Jakarta	Sleman, Special Region of Yogyakarta
20:15 UTC+7	Riyan 20'; Al Hamra 22' (o.g.)	Report		Stadium: Maguwoharjo Stadium; Attendance: 0 Referee: Agus Fauzan Arifin (Sleman)

16 December 2022 15 (Reschedule)	Persija Jakarta	1–1	Persebaya Surabaya	Sleman, Special Region of Yogyakarta
15:00 UTC+7	Nico 48'	Report	Sílvio Rodrigues 90+3'	Stadium: Maguwoharjo Stadium; Attendance: 0 Referee: Fariq Hitaba (Yogyakarta)

20 December 2022 16 (Reschedule)	Persija Jakarta	3–2	Dewa United F.C.	Bantul, Special Region of Yogyakarta
20:15 UTC+7	Behrens 22'; Yusuf Helal 56', 67' (pen.)	Report	Risto 15'; Sugeng 31'	Stadium: Sultan Agung Stadium; Attendance: 0 Referee: Steven Yubel Poli (Manado)

23 December 2022 17 (Reschedule)	PSS Sleman	0–0; Match Abandoned	Persija Jakarta	Surakarta, Central Java
15:00 UTC+7		Report		Stadium: Manahan Stadium; Attendance: 0 Referee: Ruli Ruslin Tambuntina (Malang)
Note: The match was abandoned at 46 minutes 33 seconds due to waterlogged field conditions

8 January 2023 17 (Reschedule)	PSS Sleman	0–2	Persija Jakarta	Bantul, Special Region of Yogyakarta
16:30 UTC+7		Report	Riko 81'; Ginanjar 89'	Stadium: Sultan Agung Stadium; Attendance: 0 Referee: Ruli Ruslin Tambuntina (Malang)
Note: Match restarted at 46 minutes 33 seconds

11 January 2023 11 (Reschedule)	Persib Bandung	1–0	Persija Jakarta	Bandung, West Java
15:30 UTC+7	Ciro 63'	Report		Stadium: Gelora Bandung Lautan Api Stadium; Attendance: 21,257; Referee: Steven Yubel Poli (Manado)

15 January 2023 18 (Reschedule)	Persija Jakarta	3–2	Bali United F.C.	Bekasi, West Java
15:30 UTC+7	Resky 10'; Hansamu 90+6'; Kúdela 90+10'	Report	Spasojević 27', 41'	Stadium: Patriot Chandrabhaga Stadium; Attendance: 22,990; Referee: Thoriq Munir Alkatiri (Bandung)

19 January 2023 19	Persis Solo	1–0	Persija Jakarta	Sleman, Special Region of Yogyakarta
18:30 UTC+7	Samsul 39'	Report		Stadium: Maguwoharjo Stadium; Attendance: 0 Referee: Hamim Tohari (Lamongan)

25 January 2023 20	Persija Jakarta	4–2	PSM Makassar	Bekasi, West Java
15:30 UTC+7	Yusuf Helal 21', 81'; Aji 36', 54'	Report	Everton 67'; Rasyid 90+2'	Stadium: Patriot Chandrabhaga Stadium; Attendance: 12,099; Referee: Aprisman Aranda (Padangpanjang)

29 January 2023 21	Persija Jakarta	1–0	Persikabo 1973	Bekasi, West Java
15:30 UTC+7	Yusuf Helal 62' (pen.)	Report		Stadium: Patriot Chandrabhaga Stadium; Attendance: 25,554; Referee: Iwan Sukoco (Malang)

3 February 2023 22	Persija Jakarta	3–1	RANS Nusantara F.C.	Bekasi, West Java
15:30 UTC+7	Yusuf Helal 27' (pen.); Rio Fahmi 37'; Kúdela 72' (pen.)	Report	Maruoka 45+1'	Stadium: Patriot Chandrabhaga Stadium; Attendance: 15,172; Referee: Wawan Rapiko (Pekanbaru)

7 February 2023 23 (Postponed)	Persita Tangerang	Postponed	Persija Jakarta	Cibinong, Bogor Regency, West Java
18:30 UTC+7		Report		Stadium: Pakansari Stadium
Note: Persita Tangerang hosted Persija Jakarta at Pakansari Stadium on 7 February. Because it did not get the police permit.

12 February 2023 24	Persija Jakarta	2–0	Arema F.C.	Bekasi, West Java
15:00 UTC+7	Hanif 36' (pen.); Krmenčík 78'	Report		Stadium: Patriot Chandrabhaga Stadium; Attendance: 26,000; Referee: Steven Yubel Poli (Manado)

16 February 2023 25	Bhayangkara F.C.	2–1	Persija Jakarta	Cikarang, West Java
15:00 UTC+7	Mier 52' (pen.); Alex 81'	Report	Behrens 20'	Stadium: Wibawa Mukti Stadium; Attendance: 6,111; Referee: Ikhsan Prasetya Jati (Bantul)

22 February 2023 26	Persija Jakarta	2–1	PS Barito Putera	Bekasi, West Java
15:00 UTC+7	Riko 35'; Hansamu 90+8'	Report	Gustavo 32'	Stadium: Patriot Chandrabhaga Stadium; Attendance: 8,154; Referee: Hamim Tohari (Lamongan)

26 February 2023 27	Madura United F.C.	0–0	Persija Jakarta	Pamekasan, East Java
15:00 UTC+7		Report		Stadium: Gelora Madura Ratu Pamelingan Stadium; Attendance: 574; Referee: Fariq Hitaba (Yogyakarta)

4 March 2023 28 (Postponed)	Persija Jakarta	Postponed	Persib Bandung	Central Jakarta, Jakarta
15:00 UTC+7		Report		Stadium: Gelora Bung Karno Stadium
Note: Persija Jakarta hosted Persib Bandung on 4 March. Because it did not get the police permit while play at Patriot Chandrabhaga Stadium and Gelora Bung Karno Stadium prepared for Blackpink World Tour Concert at 11–12 March 2023

8 March 2023 29	Borneo F.C. Samarinda	3–1	Persija Jakarta	Samarinda, East Kalimantan
18:00 UTC+8	Sihran 9'; Lilipaly 80'; M. Pato 87'	Report	Osvaldo 78'	Stadium: Segiri Stadium; Attendance: 5,830; Referee: Thoriq Munir Alkatiri (Bandung)

12 March 2023 30	Persik Kediri	2–0	Persija Jakarta	Kediri, East Java
15:00 UTC+7	Hamra 10'; Khanafi 75'	Report		Stadium: Brawijaya Stadium; Attendance: 5,951; Referee: Asep Yandis (Karawang)

16 March 2023 31	Persija Jakarta	1–0	PSIS Semarang	Cikarang, West Java
15:00 UTC+7	Riko 15'	Report		Stadium: Wibawa Mukti Stadium; Attendance: 0 Referee: Iwan Sukoco (Malang)

28 March 2023 23 (Reschedule)	Persita Tangerang	1–0	Persija Jakarta	Kelapa Dua, Tangerang Regency, Banten
20:30 UTC+7	Javlon 88'	Report		Stadium: Indomilk Arena; Attendance: 0 Referee: Fariq Hitaba (Yogyakarta)

31 March 2023 28 (Reschedule)	Persija Jakarta	2–0	Persib Bandung	Bekasi, West Java
20:30 UTC+7	Riko 45+4'; Krmenčík 72'	Report		Stadium: Patriot Chandrabhaga Stadium; Attendance: 24,961; Referee: Iwan Sukoco (Malang)

5 April 2023 32	Persebaya Surabaya	0–1	Persija Jakarta	Gresik, East Java
20:30 UTC+7		Report	Witan 6'	Stadium: Gelora Joko Samudro Stadium; Attendance: 6,000; Referee: Dwi Purba Adi Wicaksana (Kudus)

10 April 2022 33	Dewa United F.C.	0–1	Persija Jakarta	Kelapa Dua, Tangerang Regency, Banten
20:30 UTC+7		Report	Hansamu 90+7'	Stadium: Indomilk Arena; Attendance: 0 Referee: Aprisman Aranda (Padangpanjang)

15 April 2023 34	Persija Jakarta	5–0	PSS Sleman	Central Jakarta, Jakarta
20:30 UTC+7	Krmenčík 2', 26', 90+3'; Witan 48'; Aji 88'	Report		Stadium: Gelora Bung Karno Stadium; Attendance: 60,134; Referee: Steven Yubel Poli (Manado)

=== Piala Indonesia ===
In late August 2022, the tournament was cancelled due to lack of sponsor after the participating clubs were announced in July 2022.

== Statistics ==
=== Squad appearances and goals ===
Last updated on 16 April 2023

No.	Pos	Nat	Player	Total		Liga 1		Piala Indonesia	
No.	Pos	Nat	Player	Apps	Goals	Apps	Goals	Apps	Goals
Goalkeepers
22	GK	(Indonesia) IDN	Risky Muhammad Sudirman	0	0	0	0	0	0
26	GK	(Indonesia) IDN	Andritany Ardhiyasa	34	0	34	0	0	0
31	GK	(Indonesia) IDN	Adre Arido Geovani	0	0	0	0	0	0
88	GK	(Indonesia) IDN	Cahya Supriadi	1	0	0+1	0	0	0
Defenders
2	DF	(Indonesia) IDN	Ilham Rio Fahmi	29	1	24+5	1	0	0
6	DF	(Indonesia) IDN	Tony Sucipto	17	0	3+14	0	0	0
11	DF	(Indonesia) IDN	Firza Andika	32	1	31+1	1	0	0
17	DF	(Czech Republic) CZE	Ondřej Kúdela	31	2	31	2	0	0
23	DF	(Indonesia) IDN	Hansamu Yama Pranata	24	3	24	3	0	0
28	DF	(Indonesia) IDN	Ahmad Birrul Walidain	6	0	3+3	0	0	0
35	DF	(Indonesia) IDN	Rachmat Nicko	2	0	0+2	0	0	0
41	DF	(Indonesia) IDN	Muhammad Ferarri	23	0	22+1	0	0	0
55	DF	(Indonesia) IDN	Dandi Maulana Abdulhak	10	0	3+7	0	0	0
56	DF	(Indonesia) IDN	Maman Abdurrahman	15	0	8+7	0	0	0
90	DF	(Indonesia) IDN	Fava Sheva Rustanto	0	0	0	0	0	0
96	DF	(Indonesia) IDN	Moh. Arya Salim	0	0	0	0	0	0
Midfielders
8	MF	(Indonesia) IDN	Syahrian Abimanyu	21	0	19+2	0	0	0
10	MF	(Germany) GER	Hanno Behrens	18	5	16+2	5	0	0
18	MF	(Indonesia) IDN	Resa Aditya Nugraha	0	0	0	0	0	0
19	MF	(Indonesia) IDN	Hanif Abdurrauf Sjahbandi	28	1	26+2	1	0	0
21	MF	(Indonesia) IDN	Alfriyanto Nico Saputro	19	1	7+12	1	0	0
24	MF	(Indonesia) IDN	Resky Fandi Witriawan	30	1	25+5	1	0	0
25	MF	(Indonesia) IDN	Riko Simanjuntak	30	5	29+1	5	0	0
57	MF	(Indonesia) IDN	Ginanjar Wahyu Ramadhani	18	1	2+16	1	0	0
58	MF	(Indonesia) IDN	Frengky Deaner Missa	12	1	5+7	1	0	0
77	MF	(Indonesia) IDN	Dony Tri Pamungkas	14	0	3+11	0	0	0
78	MF	(Indonesia) IDN	Witan Sulaeman	10	2	7+3	2	0	0
85	MF	(Indonesia) IDN	Sandi Arta Samosir	8	0	0+8	0	0	0
94	DF	(Indonesia) IDN	Achmad Maulana Syarif	0	0	0	0	0	0
Forwards
9	FW	(Bahrain) BHR	Abdulla Yusuf Abdulrahim Mohamed Helal	17	9	15+2	9	0	0
15	FW	(Indonesia) IDN	Raka Cahyana Rizky	0	0	0	0	0	0
27	FW	(Czech Republic) CZE	Michael Krmenčík	23	10	18+5	10	0	0
46	FW	(Indonesia) IDN	Osvaldo Ardiles Haay	11	1	1+10	1	0	0
99	FW	(Indonesia) IDN	Aji Kusuma	16	3	10+6	3	0	0
Players who have made an appearance or had a squad number this season but have left the club
4	DF	(Indonesia) IDN	Ryuji Utomo Prabowo	3	0	2+1	0	0	0
5	DF	(Indonesia) IDN	Otávio Dutra	0	0	0	0	0	0
7	DF	(Indonesia) IDN	Muhammad Rezaldi Hehanusa	4	0	1+3	0	0	0
13	DF	(Indonesia) IDN	Barnabas Sobor	0	0	0	0	0	0
40	DF	(Indonesia) IDN	Al Hamra Hehanusa	3	0	2+1	0	0	0
69	DF	(Indonesia) IDN	Rangga Widiansyah	0	0	0	0	0	0
80	MF	(Indonesia) IDN	Braif Fatari	4	0	1+3	0	0	0
89	FW	(Indonesia) IDN	Taufik Hidayat	9	0	2+7	0	0	0
98	FW	(Indonesia) IDN	Ricky Ricardo Cristian G. T. Cawor	4	0	0+4	0	0	0

Last updated: 16 April 2023.
Source: Soccerway

=== Top scorers ===
The list is sorted by shirt number when total goals are equal.

Rnk	Pos	No.	Player	Liga 1	Piala Indonesia	Total
1	CF	27	(Czech Republic) Michael Krmenčík	10	0	10
2	FW	9	(Bahrain) Abdulla Yusuf Abdulrahim Mohamed Helal	9	0	9
3	CM	10	(Germany) Hanno Behrens	5	0	5
3	RW	25	(Indonesia) Riko Simanjuntak	5	0	5
4	CB	23	(Indonesia) Hansamu Yama Pranata	3	0	3
4	CF	99	(Indonesia) Aji Kusuma	3	0	3
5	CB	17	(Czech Republic) Ondřej Kúdela	2	0	2
5	CF	78	(Indonesia) Witan Sulaeman	2	0	2
6	LB	58	(Indonesia) Frengky Deaner Missa	1	0	1
6	LB	11	(Indonesia) Firza Andika	1	0	1
6	AMF	57	(Indonesia) Ginanjar Wahyu Ramadhani	1	0	1
6	LW	21	(Indonesia) Alfriyanto Nico Saputro	1	0	1
6	DM	24	(Indonesia) Resky Fandi Witriawan	1	0	1
6	RB	2	(Indonesia) Ilham Rio Fahmi	1	0	1
6	CM	19	(Indonesia) Hanif Abdurrauf Sjahbandi	1	0	1
6	LW	46	(Indonesia) Osvaldo Ardiles Haay	1	0	1
Total				47	0	47

Last updated: 16 April 2023.
Source: Soccerway

=== Top assist ===
The list is sorted by shirt number when total assists are equal.

Rnk	Pos	No.	Player	Liga 1	Piala Indonesia	Total
1	RM	25	(Indonesia) Riko Simanjuntak	9	0	9
2	CM	8	(Indonesia) Syahrian Abimanyu	4	0	4
3	LB	11	(Indonesia) Firza Andika	3	0	3
4	LW	77	(Indonesia) Dony Tri Pamungkas	2	0	2
4	DF	41	(Indonesia) Muhammad Ferarri	2	0	2
4	RB	2	(Indonesia) Ilham Rio Fahmi	2	0	2
5	CM	10	(Germany) Hanno Behrens	1	0	1
5	CM	19	(Indonesia) Hanif Abdurrauf Sjahbandi	1	0	1
5	FW	98	(Indonesia) Ricky Ricardo Cristian G. T. Cawor	1	0	1
5	FW	27	(Czech Republic) Michael Krmenčík	1	0	1
5	FW	9	(Bahrain) Abdulla Yusuf Abdulrahim Mohamed Helal	1	0	1
5	RW	21	(Indonesia) Alfriyanto Nico Saputro	1	0	1
5	CF	99	(Indonesia) Aji Kusuma	1	0	1
5	LW	46	(Indonesia) Osvaldo Ardiles Haay	1	0	1
5	LW	78	(Indonesia) Witan Sulaeman	1	0	1
Total				31	0	31

Last updated: 16 April 2023.

=== Clean sheets ===
The list is sorted by shirt number when total clean sheets are equal.

Rnk	No.	Player	Liga 1	Piala Indonesia	Total
1	26	(Indonesia) Andritany Ardhiyasa	15	0	15
2	88	(Indonesia) Cahya Supriadi	1	0	1
Total			16	0	16

Last updated: 16 April 2023.
Source: Soccerway

=== Disciplinary record ===
Includes all competitive matches. Players listed below made at least one appearance for Persija Jakarta first squad during the season.

Rnk	Pos.	No.	Nat.	Name	Liga 1			Piala Indonesia			Total			Disciplinary Points	Notes
Rnk	Pos.	No.	Nat.	Name	Yellow card	Second yellow card	Red card	Yellow card	Second yellow card	Red card	Yellow card	Second yellow card	Red card	Disciplinary Points	Notes
1	MF	19	(Indonesia)	Hanif Abdurrauf Sjahbandi	9	0	0	0	0	0	9	0	0	0	Misses 2 matches: vs Persikabo 1973 29 January 2023 vs Dewa United F.C. 10 April 2023
1	CB	41	(Indonesia)	Muhammad Ferarri	9	0	0	0	0	0	9	0	0	0	Misses 1 match: vs Persebaya Surabaya 5 April 2023
2	MF	24	(Indonesia)	Resky Fandi Witriawan	7	0	0	0	0	0	7	0	0	0	Misses 1 match: vs Dewa United F.C. 20 December 2022
3	CM	8	(Indonesia)	Syahrian Abimanyu	6	0	0	0	0	0	6	0	0	0	Misses 1 match: vs Bali United F.C. 15 January 2023
4	LB	11	(Indonesia)	Firza Andika	5	0	0	0	0	0	5	0	0	0	Misses 1 match: vs Madura United F.C. 26 March 2023
5	CF	9	(Bahrain)	Abdulla Yusuf Abdulrahim Mohamed Helal	4	0	0	0	0	0	4	0	0	0	Misses 1 match: vs Persebaya Surabaya 16 December 2022
5	RW	25	(Indonesia)	Riko Simanjuntak	4	0	0	0	0	0	4	0	0	0	Misses 1 match: vs Persebaya Surabaya 5 April 2023
5	FW	27	(Czech Republic)	Michael Krmenčík	4	0	0	0	0	0	4	0	0	0	Misses 7 matches: vs Persik Kediri 10 December 2022 vs PSIS Semarang 13 December 2022 vs Persebaya Surabaya 16 December 2022 vs Dewa United F.C. 20 December 2022 vs PSS Sleman 8 January 2023 vs Bali United F.C. 15 January 2023 vs Persebaya Surabaya 5 April 2023
5	LW	21	(Indonesia)	Alfriyanto Nico Saputro	4	0	0	0	0	0	4	0	0	0	Misses 1 match: vs Persebaya Surabaya 5 April 2023
6	RB	2	(Indonesia)	Ilham Rio Fahmi	3	0	0	0	0	0	3	0	0	0	
6	CB	6	(Indonesia)	Tony Sucipto	3	0	0	0	0	0	3	0	0	0	
6	GKC		(Czech Republic)	Jan Klima	0	0	1	0	0	0	0	0	1	0	Suspended for 12 Months
6	CB	17	(Czech Republic)	Ondřej Kúdela	3	0	0	0	0	0	3	0	0	0	
6	CB	23	(Indonesia)	Hansamu Yama Pranata	3	0	0	0	0	0	3	0	0	0	
6	CF	99	(Indonesia)	Aji Kusuma	3	0	0	0	0	0	3	0	0	0	
7	CB	56	(Indonesia)	Maman Abdurrahman	2	0	0	0	0	0	2	0	0	0	
7	GK	26	(Indonesia)	Andritany Ardhiyasa	2	0	0	0	0	0	2	0	0	0	
7	RB	28	(Indonesia)	Ahmad Birrul Walidain	2	0	0	0	0	0	2	0	0	0	
7	MANAGER		(Germany)	Thomas Jens Uwe Doll	2	0	0	0	0	0	2	0	0	0	Misses 1 match: vs Persib Bandung 31 March 2023
8	LB	58	(Indonesia)	Frengky Deaner Missa	1	0	0	0	0	0	1	0	0	0	
8	CB	55	(Indonesia)	Dandi Maulana Abdulhak	1	0	0	0	0	0	1	0	0	0	
8	AHC		(Italy)	Pasquale Domenico Rocco	1	0	0	0	0	0	1	0	0	0	
8	AMF	57	(Indonesia)	Ginanjar Wahyu Ramadhani	1	0	0	0	0	0	1	0	0	0	

Last updated: 16 April 2023
Source: Competitions
Only competitive matches
(yellow card) = Number of bookings; (second yellow card) = Number of sending offs after a second yellow card; (red card) = Number of sending offs by a direct red card.

=== Summary ===
Games played	34 (34 Liga 1)
Games won	20 (20 Liga 1)
Games drawn	6 (6 Liga 1)
Games lost	8 (8 Liga 1)
Goals scored	47 (47 Liga 1)
Goals conceded	27 (27 Liga 1)
Goal difference	+20 (+20 Liga 1)
Clean sheets	15
Yellow cards	79 (79 Liga 1)
Red cards	1 (1 Liga 1)
Most appearances	(Indonesia) Andritany Ardhiyasa (34 Appearances)
Top scorer	(Czech Republic) Michael Krmenčík (10 Goals)
Top assist	(Indonesia) Riko Simanjuntak (9 Assists)
Winning Percentage	20/34 (58.82%)

Last updated: 16 April 2023.
Source: Liga 1
