= Sobor =

Sobor may refer to:

== East Slavic context ==
- An East Slavic synonym for synod in the Eastern Orthodox Church
- A katholikon, a privileged type of church building in the Orthodoxy (Church Slavonic: съборъ, romanized: sobor)
- Zemsky Sobor, assembly of the land in the medieval Russia
- The Cathedral (Honchar novel), a 1968 novel (Ukrainian: «Собор», romanized: Sobor),

== Other ==
- Sobor, Hungary, a village
- Sobor No. 514, a former municipal district in Alberta, Canada.
- Barnabas Sobor, Indonesian footballer
