= Hanno Behrens =

German professional footballer

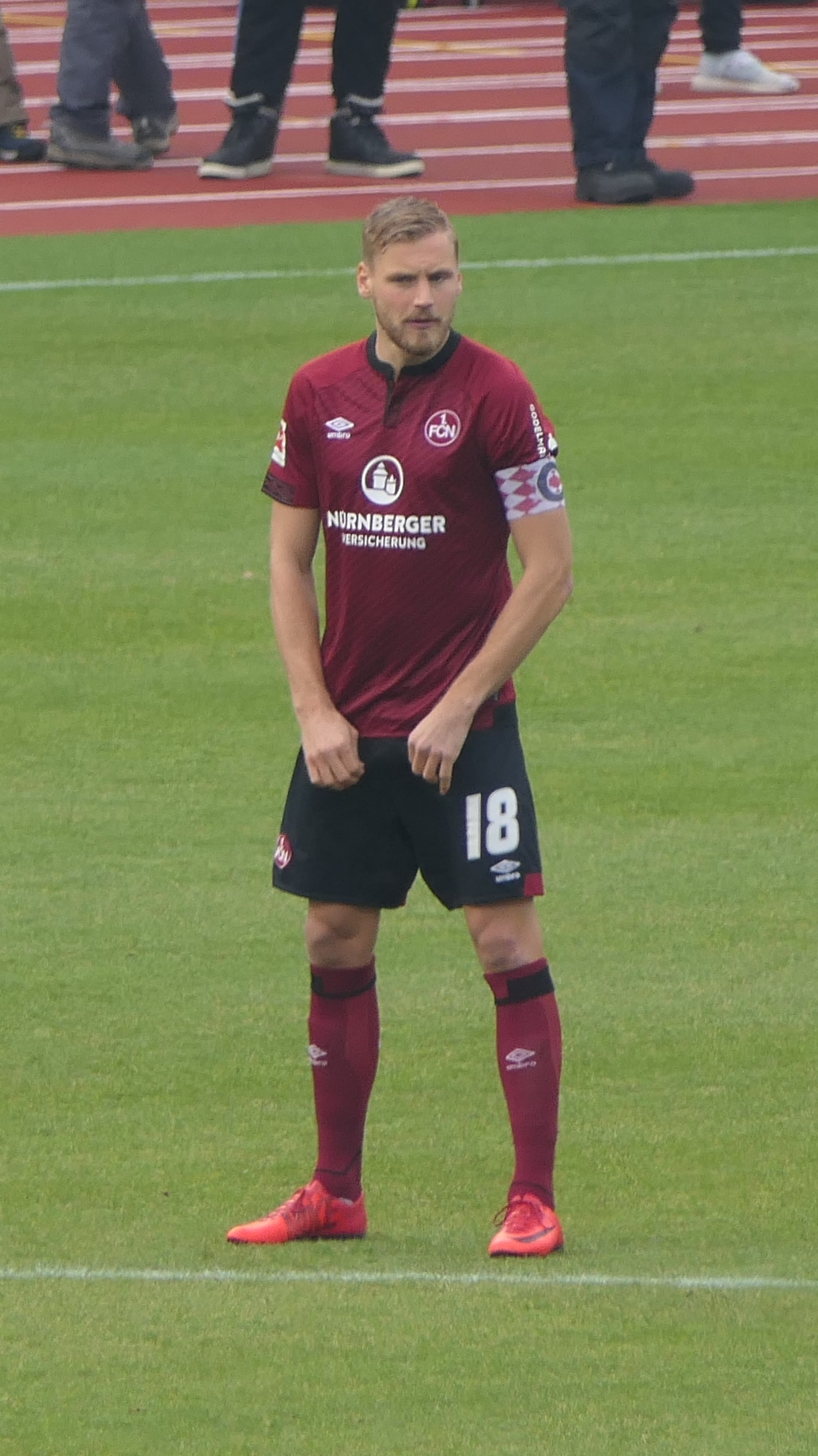
- Behrens with 1. FC Nürnberg in 2019

Personal information
- Date of birth: 26 March 1990 (age 36)
- Place of birth: Elmshorn, Germany
- Height: 1.88 m (6 ft 2 in)
- Position: Midfielder

Youth career
- 1994–2005: FC Elmshorn 1920
- 2005–2008: Hamburger SV

Senior career*
Years	Team	Apps	(Gls)
2008–2012	Hamburger SV II	79	(7)
2012–2015	Darmstadt 98	98	(12)
2015–2021	1. FC Nürnberg	181	(30)
2021–2022	Hansa Rostock	27	(5)
2022–2023	Persija Jakarta	18	(5)
2023–2024	VfB Lübeck	0	(0)
- * Club domestic league appearances and goals

Hanno Behrens (German pronunciation: [ˈhano ˈbeːʁəns]; born 26 March 1990) is a German former professional footballer who played as a midfielder.

== Career ==
Behrens began his career with Hamburger SV, breaking into the reserve team in 2008. The following year, he was promoted to the first team, but never made an appearance, continuing to play regularly for the reserves over the next three seasons.

In 2012, he moved to Darmstadt 98 and made his debut for the club in August of that year, as a substitute for Elton da Costa in a 3–1 defeat to Chemnitzer FC, in which he scored Darmstadt's only goal.

In July 2017, Behrens agreed to a contract extension with 1. FC Nürnberg. On 6 May 2018. he scored as Nürnberg won 2–0 against SV Sandhausen to clinch promotion to the Bundesliga.

In June 2021, Hansa Rostock announced the signing of Behrens on a free transfer for the 2021–22 season. He signed a one-year contract with an option.

In early July 2022, Indonesian top flight league club Persija announced the signing of Behrens for 2022–23 season. On 23 July 2022, He made his league debut by starting in a 0–1 loss against Bali United. Later that month, he scored his first goal after receiving a through pass from Syahrian Abimanyu in the 15th minute, in a 2–1 winning match against Persis at Patriot Candrabhaga Stadium.

== Career statistics ==
As of match played 4 July 2024

Appearances and goals by club, season and competition
Club	Season	League			National Cup		Other		Total	
Club	Season	Division	Apps	Goals	Apps	Goals	Apps	Goals	Apps	Goals
Hamburger SV II	2008–09	Regionalliga Nord	16	0	—		0	0	16	0
Hamburger SV II	2009–10	Regionalliga Nord	25	4	—		0	0	25	4
Hamburger SV II	2010–11	Regionalliga Nord	21	1	—		0	0	21	1
Hamburger SV II	2011–12	Regionalliga Nord	17	2	—		0	0	17	2
Hamburger SV II	Total		79	7	0	0	0	0	79	7
Darmstadt 98	2012–13	3. Liga	31	3	—		0	0	31	3
Darmstadt 98	2013–14	3. Liga	36	4	2	1	2 (Note: Appearance(s) in Bundesliga relegation play-offs)	1	40	6
Darmstadt 98	2014–15	2. Bundesliga	31	5	1	0	0	0	32	5
Darmstadt 98	Total		98	12	3	1	2	1	103	14
1. FC Nürnberg	2015–16	2. Bundesliga	33	5	3	1	2 (Note: Appearance(s) in 2. Bundesliga relegation play-offs)	0	38	6
1. FC Nürnberg	2016–17	2. Bundesliga	31	2	2	0	0	0	33	2
1. FC Nürnberg	2017–18	2. Bundesliga	33	14	3	1	0	0	36	15
1. FC Nürnberg	2018–19	Bundesliga	30	4	3	0	0	0	33	4
1. FC Nürnberg	2019–20	2. Bundesliga	34	5	2	0	2	0	38	5
1. FC Nürnberg	2020–21	2. Bundesliga	20	0	1	0	0	0	21	0
1. FC Nürnberg	Total		181	30	14	2	4	0	199	32
Hansa Rostock	2021–22	2. Bundesliga	27	5	2	0	0	0	29	5
Hansa Rostock	Total		27	5	2	0	0	0	29	5
Persija Jakarta	2022–23	Liga 1	18	5	0	0	0	0	18	5
Career total			403	59	19	3	6	1	428	63
