= Rio Fahmi =

Indonesian footballer

- Rio with Persija in 2026

Personal information
- Full name: Ilham Rio Fahmi
- Date of birth: 6 October 2001 (age 25)
- Place of birth: Banjarnegara, Indonesia
- Height: 1.69 m (5 ft 7 in)
- Position: Right-back

Team information
- Current team: Persija Jakarta
- Number: 2

Youth career
- 2018–2020: Persibara Banjarnegara
- 2020–2021: Persija Jakarta

Senior career*
Years	Team	Apps	(Gls)
2021–	Persija Jakarta	126	(2)
2026	→ Arema (loan)	15	(0)

International career^{‡}
2022–2024	Indonesia U23	19	(1)
Medal record
Men's football
Representing Indonesia
Southeast Asian Games
Gold medal – first place	2023 Cambodia	Team
Bronze medal – third place	2021 Vietnam	Team
- * Club domestic league appearances and goals as of 8 November 2026 ‡ National team caps and goals as of 2 May 2024

Ilham Rio Fahmi (born 6 October 2001) is an Indonesian professional footballer who plays as a right-back for Super League club Persija Jakarta.

== Club career ==
=== Persija Jakarta ===
Fahmi is one of the young players promoted from the Persija Jakarta youth team. Fahmi made his first-team debut on 12 September 2021 as a substitute in a match against PSIS Semarang at the Indomilk Arena, Tangerang. In a match against Madura United on 22 October, he played the full 90 minutes for the first time in a 2–3 win in gameweek 8. Eight days later, Fahmi provided an assist for Alfriyanto Nico in a 2–2 draw over Persik Kediri.

On 26 January 2022, he scored his first league goal in a 1–2 victory against Persita Tangerang. Throughout the season, he was used a first choice right-back behind Marco Motta, finishing the season with 26 league appearance, scored one goal, and two assists.

My target is certainly to play better at every opportunity given. The evaluation of my game is small mistakes that must be reduced and eliminated. I have to fight and pray that I can help the team better.

— Fahmi speaking about his target with Persija Jakarta after extended contract.

On 3 January 2022, Fahmi extended his contract with the club for three half years, it was announced by Persija through the club's official Instagram account. In the following season, Fahmi became a starter in the pre-season tournament 2022 Indonesia President's Cup on 25 June 2022, where he scored his first goal for Persija in a 1–2 loss to Borneo Samarinda.

On 3 February 2023, he scored his first goal of the season in a 3–1 home win over RANS Nusantara. On 22 February, Fahmi provided an assist of the season for Hansamu Yama in a 2–1 home win over PS Barito Putera. On 15 April, Fahmi provided another assist for Michael Krmenčík in the last match of 2022–23 Liga 1 against PSS Sleman. The game ended in a 5–0 victory for Persija.

==== Arema (loan) ====
On 31 January 2026, Fahmi officially joined Arema on loan until the end of the season.

== International career ==
Rio was part of the Indonesia under-23 team that won bronze at the 2021 Southeast Asian Games in Vietnam. and gold at the 2023 Southeast Asian Games in Cambodia

== Career statistics ==
=== Club ===
As of 31 October 2026

Club	Season	League			Cup		Continental		Other (Note: Appearances in Indonesia President's Cup)		Total	
Club	Season	Division	Apps	Goals	Apps	Goals	Apps	Goals	Apps	Goals	Apps	Goals
Persija Jakarta	2021–22	Liga 1	26	1	0	0	—		0	0	26	1
Persija Jakarta	2022–23	Liga 1	30	1	0	0	—		2	1	32	2
Persija Jakarta	2023–24	Liga 1	21	0	0	0	—		0	0	21	0
Persija Jakarta	2024–25	Liga 1	28	0	0	0	—		4	0	32	0
Persija Jakarta	2025–26	Super League	16	0	0	0	—		0	0	16	0
Persija Jakarta	2026–27	Super League	4	0	0	0	—		0	0	4	0
Persija Jakarta	Total		125	2	0	0	—		6	1	131	3
Arema (loan)	2025–26	Super League	15	0	0	0	—		0	0	15	0
Career total			140	2	0	0	0	0	6	1	146	3

=== International goals ===
International under-23 goals

Goal	Date	Venue	Opponent	Score	Result	Competition
1.	9 September 2023	Manahan Stadium, Surakarta, Indonesia	Chinese Taipei	5–0	9–0	2024 AFC U-23 Asian Cup qualification

== Honours ==
=== International ===
Indonesia U-23

- SEA Games gold medal: 2023; bronze medal: 2021

=== Individual ===
- Liga 1 Best Young Player: 2022–23
- Liga 1 Team of the Season: 2022–23
