= 2015–16 1. FC Nürnberg season =

1. FC Nürnberg
2015–16 season
- Manager: René Weiler
- Stadium: Frankenstadion
- 2. Bundesliga: 3rd
- DFB-Pokal: 3rd Round
- Top goalscorer: League: Niclas Füllkrug (14); All: Niclas Füllkrug (15)
- Highest home attendance: 50,000 vs St. Pauli
- Lowest home attendance: 21,561 vs Braunschweig
- Average home league attendance: 30,709
Home colours	Away colours	Third colours

The 2015–16 1. FC Nürnberg season is the 116th season in the club's football history.

== Review and events ==
In 2015–16 the club plays in the 2. Bundesliga.

The club also took part in the 2015–16 edition of the DFB-Pokal, the German Cup.

== Friendly matches ==
1 July 2015	SSV Jahn Regensburg	2–1	1. FC Nürnberg	Neumarkt
18:00 CEST (UTC+02)				Attendance: 900; Referee: Florian Kornblum

4 July 2015	1. FC Nürnberg	1–2	Bohemians 1905	Nuremberg
15:00 CEST (UTC+02)				Attendance: 1,000; Referee: Steffen Mix

11 July 2015	1. FC Schweinfurt 05	0–1	1. FC Nürnberg	Schweinfurt
17:30 CEST (UTC+02)				Stadium: Willy-Sachs-Stadion; Attendance: 2,612; Referee: Johannes Hartmeier

14 July 2015	FC Würzburger Kickers	2–2	1. FC Nürnberg	Bad Kissingen
19:00 CEST (UTC+02)				Attendance: 3,400; Referee: Florian Badstübner

19 July 2015	1. FC Nürnberg	2–2	Celta de Vigo	Weismain
19:00 CEST (UTC+02)				Stadium: Waldstadion; Attendance: 2,514; Referee: Benjamin Cortus

8 October 2015	1. FC Nürnberg	2–0	FC St. Gallen	Nuremberg
15:30 CEST (UTC+02)				Attendance: 300; Referee: Benjamin Brand

16 January 2016	SV Darmstadt 98	0–1	1. FC Nürnberg	Darmstadt
15:30 CET (UTC+01)				Stadium: Stadion am Böllenfalltor; Attendance: 3,000; Referee: Christof Günsch

== Competitions ==
Win Draw Loss

=== 2. Bundesliga ===
==== League table ====
Pos	Team	Pld	W	D	L	GF	GA	GD	Pts	Promotion, qualification or relegation
1	SC Freiburg (C, P)	34	22	6	6	75	39	+36	72	Promotion to Bundesliga
2	RB Leipzig (P)	34	20	7	7	54	32	+22	67	Promotion to Bundesliga
3	1. FC Nürnberg	34	19	8	7	68	41	+27	65	Qualification for promotion play-offs
4	FC St. Pauli	34	15	8	11	45	39	+6	53	
5	VfL Bochum	34	13	12	9	56	40	+16	51	

Source: DFB
Rules for classification: 1) Points; 2) Goal difference; 3) Goals scored
(C) Champions; (P) Promoted

==== Results summary ====
Overall								Home						Away					
Pld	W	D	L	GF	GA	GD	Pts	W	D	L	GF	GA	GD	W	D	L	GF	GA	GD
34	19	8	7	68	41	+27	65	11	5	1	33	18	+15	8	3	6	35	23	+12

Last updated: 15 May 2016.
Source: Bundesliga

==== Matches ====
27 July 2015 1	SC Freiburg	6–3	1. FC Nürnberg	Freiburg
20:15 CEST (UTC+02)	Petersen 8', 11', 13'; Frantz 41'; Philipp 61'; Schuster 90'	Match Report	44' Möhwald; 47' Behrens; 53' (pen.) Schöpf	Stadium: Schwarzwald-Stadion; Attendance: 23,700; Referee: Tobias Stieler; Man of the Match: Petersen

31 July 2015 2	1. FC Nürnberg	3–2	1. FC Heidenheim	Nuremberg
18:30 CEST (UTC+02)	Blum 13'; Leipertz 41' (ogg.); Polák 87'	Match Report	17' Leipertz; 59' Morabit	Stadium: Frankenstadion; Attendance: 24,850; Referee: Bastian Dankert; Man of the Match: Blum

17 August 2015 3	1. FC Nürnberg	2–2	TSV 1860 München	Nuremberg
20:15 CEST (UTC+02)	Burgstaller 54'; Stark 63'	Match Report	45' Bülow; 74' Adlung	Stadium: Frankenstadion; Attendance: 36,547; Referee: Robert Kampka; Man of the Match: Adlung

23 August 2015 4	VfL Bochum	2–1	1. FC Nürnberg	Bochum
13:30 CEST (UTC+02)	Terodde 37'; Haberer 64'	Match Report	2' Burgstaller	Stadium: Ruhrstadion; Attendance: 21,131; Referee: Tobias Welz; Man of the Match: Celozzi

30 August 2015 5	1. FC Nürnberg	1–0	Fortuna Düsseldorf	Nuremberg
13:30 CEST (UTC+02)	Behrens 67'	Match Report		Stadium: Frankenstadion; Attendance: 26,379; Referee: Christian Dingert; Man of the Match: Hovland

13 September 2015 6	SpVgg Greuther Fürth	3–2	1. FC Nürnberg	Fürth
13:30 CEST (UTC+02)	Berisha 39'; Weilandt 58'; Freis 90'	Match Report	7' Burgstaller; 85' Schöpf	Stadium: Stadion am Laubenweg; Attendance: 17,200 (sell-out); Referee: Felix Zwayer; Man of the Match: Weilandt

19 September 2015 7	1. FC Nürnberg	2–0	SV Sandhausen	Nuremberg
13:00 CEST (UTC+02)	Behrens 18'; Polák 82'	Match Report		Stadium: Frankenstadion; Attendance: 23,378; Referee: Arne Aarnink; Man of the Match: Behrens

22 September 2015 8	1. FC Kaiserslautern	0–3	1. FC Nürnberg	Kaiserslautern
17:30 CEST (UTC+02)		Match Report	42' Hovland; 56' Schöpf; 61' Burgstaller	Stadium: Fritz-Walter-Stadion; Attendance: 21,459; Referee: René Rohde; Man of the Match: Burgstaller

25 September 2015 9	1. FC Nürnberg	2–2	Arminia Bielefeld	Nuremberg
18:30 CEST (UTC+02)	Burgstaller 83', 89'	Match Report	4', 48' Klos	Stadium: Frankenstadion; Attendance: 24,184; Referee: Martin Thomsen; Man of the Match: Burgstaller

4 October 2015 10	RB Leipzig	3–2	1. FC Nürnberg	Leipzig
13:30 CEST (UTC+02)	Kaiser 8'; Selke 11', 16'	Match Report	62' Bulthuis; 76' Füllkrug	Stadium: Red Bull Arena; Attendance: 28,987; Referee: Christian Dingert; Man of the Match: Selke

17 October 2015 11	1. FC Nürnberg	1–1	FSV Frankfurt	Nuremberg
13:00 CEST (UTC+02)	Schöpf 57'	Match Report	90' (pen.) Dedić	Stadium: Frankenstadion; Attendance: 23,798; Referee: Florian Heft; Man of the Match: Weis

24 October 2015 12	MSV Duisburg	0–0	1. FC Nürnberg	Duisburg
13:00 CEST (UTC+02)		Match Report		Stadium: MSV-Arena; Attendance: 16,418; Referee: Timo Gerach; Man of the Match: Brečko

2 November 2015 13	1. FC Nürnberg	0–0	Karlsruher SC	Nuremberg
20:15 CET (UTC+01)		Match Report		Stadium: Frankenstadion; Attendance: 25,439; Referee: Arne Aarnink; Man of the Match: Behrens

7 November 2015 14	1. FC Union Berlin	3–3	1. FC Nürnberg	Berlin
13:00 CEST (UTC+01)	Wood 21'; Skrzybski 54'; Punčec 58'	Match Report	5' (ogg.) Leistner; 65' Schöpf; 75' Erras	Stadium: Stadion An der Alten Försterei; Attendance: 21,552; Referee: Robert Kampka; Man of the Match: Wood

23 November 2015 15	1. FC Nürnberg	2–1	Eintracht Braunschweig	Nuremberg
20:15 CET (UTC+01)	Kerk 33'; Burgstaller 84'	Match Report	53' Omladič	Stadium: Frankenstadion; Attendance: 21,561; Referee: Christian Dingert; Man of the Match: Möhwald

29 November 2015 16	FC St. Pauli	0–4	1. FC Nürnberg	Hamburg
13:30 CEST (UTC+01)		Match Report	18', 43' Füllkrug; 53' Leibold; 89' Erras	Stadium: Millerntor-Stadion; Attendance: 29,546 (sell-out); Referee: Sören Storks; Man of the Match: Füllkrug

4 December 2015 17	1. FC Nürnberg	2–1	SC Paderborn	Nuremberg
18:30 CET (UTC+01)	Füllkrug 34'; Leibold 73'	Match Report	89' Stöger	Stadium: Frankenstadion; Attendance: 25,102; Referee: Marco Fritz; Man of the Match: Füllkrug

13 December 2015 18	1. FC Nürnberg	2–1	SC Freiburg	Nuremberg
13:30 CET (UTC+01)	Burgstaller 14'; Föhrenbach 65' (ogg.)	Match Report	64' Höhn	Stadium: Frankenstadion; Attendance: 28,198; Referee: Harm Osmers; Man of the Match: Margreitter

19 December 2015 19	1. FC Heidenheim	0–3	1. FC Nürnberg	Heidenheim
13:00 CEST (UTC+01)		Match Report	16' Burgstaller; 60' Schöpf; 84' Behrens	Stadium: Voith-Arena; Attendance: 14,800; Referee: Florian Meyer; Man of the Match: Behrens

6 February 2016 20	TSV 1860 München	0–1	1. FC Nürnberg	Munich
13:00 CET (UTC+01)		Match Report	23' Erras	Stadium: Allianz Arena; Attendance: 51,200; Referee: Thorsten Schriever; Man of the Match: Schäfer

15 February 2016 21	1. FC Nürnberg	1–1	VfL Bochum	Nuremberg
20:15 CET (UTC+01)	Erras 75'	Match Report	66' Terrazzino	Stadium: Frankenstadion; Attendance: 24,355; Referee: Daniel Siebert; Man of the Match: Erras

22 February 2016 22	Fortuna Düsseldorf	1–1	1. FC Nürnberg	Düsseldorf
20:15 CET (UTC+01)	Demirbay 33' (pen.)	Match Report	82' Füllkrug	Stadium: Esprit Arena; Attendance: 21,854; Referee: Tobias Stieler; Man of the Match: Erras

26 February 2016 23	1. FC Nürnberg	2–1	SpVgg Greuther Fürth	Nuremberg
18:30 CET (UTC+01)	Kerk 40'; Füllkrug 84'	Match Report	7' Žulj	Stadium: Frankenstadion; Attendance: 45,666; Referee: Günter Perl; Man of the Match: Kerk

1 March 2016 24	SV Sandhausen	0–2	1. FC Nürnberg	Sandhausen
17:30 CET (UTC+01)		Match Report	40' Füllkrug; 84' Blum	Stadium: Hardtwaldstadion; Attendance: 5,349; Referee: Harm Osmers; Man of the Match: Margreitter

4 March 2016 25	1. FC Nürnberg	2–1	1. FC Kaiserslautern	Nuremberg
20:30 CET (UTC+01)	Erras 19'; Stieber 88'	Match Report	Böðvarsson 22'	Stadium: Frankenstadion; Attendance: 31,457; Referee: Florian Meyer; Man of the Match: Erras

11 March 2016 26	Arminia Bielefeld	0–4	1. FC Nürnberg	Bielefeld
18:30 CET (UTC+01)		Match Report	Kerk 61'; Füllkrug 65' (pen.); Burgstaller 88'; Behrens 90'	Stadium: Bielefelder Alm; Attendance: 15,003; Referee: Martin Petersen; Man of the Match: Burgstaller

20 March 2016 27	1. FC Nürnberg	3–1	RB Leipzig	Nuremberg
13:30 CET (UTC+01)	Petrak 70'; Füllkrug 75'; Burgstaller 90'	Match Report	Selke 52'	Stadium: Frankenstadion; Attendance: 40,860; Referee: Felix Zwayer; Man of the Match: Burgstaller

3 April 2016 28	FSV Frankfurt	0–3	1. FC Nürnberg	Frankfurt
13:30 CEST (UTC+01)		Match Report	Füllkrug 67'; Blum 87', 89'	Stadium: Stadion am Bornheimer Hang; Attendance: 11,097; Referee: Timo Gerach; Man of the Match: Blum

10 April 2016 29	1. FC Nürnberg	1–2	MSV Duisburg	Nuremberg
13:30 CEST (UTC+01)	Leibold 62'	Match Report	Wolze 35'; Bohl 60'	Stadium: Frankenstadion; Attendance: 40,169; Referee: Sören Storks; Man of the Match: Ratajczak

16 April 2016 30	Karlsruher SC	2–1	1. FC Nürnberg	Karlsruhe
13:00 CEST (UTC+01)	Meffert 43'; Torres 86'	Match Report	Kerk 3'	Stadium: Wildparkstadion; Attendance: 17,900; Referee: Sascha Stegemann; Man of the Match: Meffert

23 April 2016 31	1. FC Nürnberg	6–2	1. FC Union Berlin	Nuremberg
13:00 CEST (UTC+01)	Leibold 49'; Füllkrug 60' (pen.), 67', 90'; Burgstaller 74'; Hovland 90'	Match Report	Nikçi 3'; Kreilach 22'	Stadium: Frankenstadion; Attendance: 30,384; Referee: Martin Thomsen; Man of the Match: Füllkrug

30 April 2016 32	Eintracht Braunschweig	3–1	1. FC Nürnberg	Braunschweig
13:00 CEST (UTC+01)	Khelifi 43'; Reichel 59'; Sauer 66'	Match Report	Burgstaller 78'	Stadium: Eintracht-Stadion; Attendance: 21,145; Referee: Robert Kampka; Man of the Match: Holtmann

8 May 2016 33	1. FC Nürnberg	1–0	FC St. Pauli	Nuremberg
15:30 CEST (UTC+01)	Füllkrug 22'	Match Report		Stadium: Frankenstadion; Attendance: 50,000 (sell-out); Referee: Marco Fritz; Man of the Match: Leibold

15 May 2016 34	SC Paderborn	0–1	1. FC Nürnberg	Paderborn
15:30 CEST (UTC+01)		Match Report	Teuchert 86'	Stadium: Benteler Arena; Attendance: 15,000; Referee: Patrick Ittrich; Man of the Match: Schäfer

==== Promotion play-offs ====
19 May 2016 First leg	Eintracht Frankfurt	1–1	1. FC Nürnberg	Frankfurt
20:30 CEST (UTC+02:00)	Russ (yellow card) 56'; Gaćinović 65'	Report	Russ 43' (o.g.); Schäfer (yellow card) 57'	Stadium: Commerzbank-Arena; Attendance: 51,500 (sell-out); Referee: Daniel Siebert; Man of the Match: Abraham

23 May 2016 Second leg	1. FC Nürnberg	0–1 (1–2 agg.)	Eintracht Frankfurt	Nuremberg
20:30 CEST (UTC+02:00)	Kerk (yellow card) 56'; Brečko (yellow card) 72'; Burgstaller (yellow card) 90+2'	Report	Oczipka (yellow card) 24'; Fabián (yellow card) 51'; Seferovic 66', (yellow card) 76'; Hrádecký (yellow card) 90+1'; Abraham (yellow card) 90+4'	Stadium: Grundig Stadion; Attendance: 50,000 (sell-out); Referee: Christian Dingert; Man of the Match: Seferovic

=== DFB-Pokal ===
10 August 2015 Round 1	VfR Aalen	0–0 (a.e.t.) (1–2 p)	1. FC Nürnberg	Aalen
18:30 CEST (UTC+02:00)	Klauß (yellow card) 36'; Barth (yellow card) 75'; Drexler (yellow card) 90'	Report	Burgstaller (yellow card) 61'; Blum (yellow card) 70'	Stadium: Scholz Arena; Attendance: 9,172; Referee: Bibiana Steinhaus
	Penalties
	Drexler (penalty missed); Schwabl (penalty missed); Klauß (penalty scored); Kienle (penalty missed); Menig (penalty missed)		(penalty missed) Behrens; (penalty missed) Brečko; (penalty scored) Schöpf; (penalty missed) Hovland; (penalty scored) Kutschke

27 October 2015 Round 2	1. FC Nürnberg	5–1	Fortuna Düsseldorf	Nuremberg
19:00 CET (UTC+01:00)	Burgstaller 10'; Behrens 17'; Füllkrug 41'; Leibold 43'; Blum 69'	Report	Demirbay 72'	Stadium: Frankenstadion; Attendance: 19,235; Referee: Marco Fritz

16 December 2015 Round 3	1. FC Nürnberg	0–2	Hertha BSC	Nuremberg
19:00 CET (UTC+01)		Match Report	32' Darida; 65' Brooks	Stadium: Frankenstadion; Attendance: 35,2014; Referee: Tobias Stieler; Man of the Match: Darida

== Overall ==
Matches played	34
Matches won	19
Matches drawn	8
Matches lost	7
Goals scored	68
Goals conceded	41
Goal difference	+27
Clean sheets	13
Yellow cards	
Red cards	5
Best result(s)	6–2 vs Union Berlin; 4–0 vs St. Pauli and Bielefeld
Worst result(s)	3–6 vs Freiburg
Points earned	65/102
