= Ricky Cawor =

Indonesian footballer

Personal information
- Full name: Ricky Ricardo Cristian Cawor
- Date of birth: 26 January 1998 (age 28)
- Place of birth: Merauke, Indonesia
- Height: 1.65 m (5 ft 5 in)
- Positions: Winger; forward

Team information
- Current team: Persipura Jayapura
- Number: 11

Youth career
- 2013: Gelora Putra
- 2019–2021: PON Papua

Senior career*
Years	Team	Apps	(Gls)
2017	Persimer Merauke	7	(0)
2018	Persemi Mimika	10	(8)
2021–2022	Persipura Jayapura	16	(3)
2022	Persija Jakarta	4	(0)
2023–2024	PSS Sleman	50	(10)
2025	Borneo Samarinda	8	(0)
2026	Barito Putera	4	(1)
2026–	Persipura Jayapura	1	(0)
- * Club domestic league appearances and goals as of 12 September 2026

Ricky Ricardo Cristian Cawor (born 26 January 1998) is an Indonesian professional footballer who plays as a winger for Championship club Persipura Jayapura.

== Club career ==
=== Persipura Jayapura ===
He was signed for Persipura Jayapura to play in Liga 1 in the 2021–22 season after scoring 11 goals at 2021 Pekan Olahraga Nasional. Cawor made his first-team debut on 6 January 2022 in a match against Persela Lamongan at the Kapten I Wayan Dipta Stadium, Gianyar Regency. He also scored his first goal for the team in injury time. On 28 February, Cawor scored the winning goal for the club in a 2–1 win over Borneo Samarinda. He added his third goals of the season on 16 March with one goal against Bhayangkara in a 1–2 win. On 12 May, Persipura's management revealed that Cawor officially left the club. Cawor is no longer with Persipura, who has just been relegated to the Liga 2. He made 16 league appearances for Persipura during the 2021–22 season, scoring three goals.

=== Persija Jakarta ===
Cawor was signed for Persija Jakarta to play in Liga 1 in the 2022–23 season. Cawor made his Persija debut in a pre-season friendly match against Malaysia Super League club Sabah on 5 June 2022. He made his league debut on 23 July in a match against Bali United at the Kapten I Wayan Dipta Stadium, Gianyar. On 11 September, Cawor provided an assist for Michael Krmenčík in a 1–0 win over PS Barito Putera. Cawor just played 4 times in first round 2022–23 Liga 1, without scoring and make one assist for the club.

=== PSS Sleman ===
On 29 January 2023, Cawor signed a contract with Liga 1 club PSS Sleman from Persija Jakarta. Cawor made his league debut for the club in a 2–0 lose against Persib Bandung, coming on as a substituted Derry Rachman. He scored his first league goal for the club on 18 March 2023, scoring the first goal in a 2–1 victory over Borneo Samarinda. These three points also closed PSS's poor results in the Liga 1 2022–23. They had experienced seven consecutive defeats and conceded 18 goal. On 2 April, Cawor scored equalizer in a 5–2 lose over PSIS Semarang at Jatidiri Stadium. He added his third goals for the club five days later with one goal against Bali United in a 2–0 home win at Maguwoharjo Stadium.

== Career statistics ==
=== Club ===
As of 12 September 2026

Club	Season	League			Cup		Continental		Other		Total	
Club	Season	Division	Apps	Goals	Apps	Goals	Apps	Goals	Apps	Goals	Apps	Goals
Persipura Jayapura	2021–22	Liga 1	16	3	0	0	–		0	0	16	3
Persija Jakarta	2022–23	Liga 1	4	0	0	0	–		2 (Note: Appearances in Indonesia President's Cup)	0	6	0
PSS Sleman	2022–23	Liga 1	10	3	0	0	–		0	0	10	3
PSS Sleman	2023–24	Liga 1	25	7	0	0	–		0	0	25	7
PSS Sleman	2024–25	Liga 1	15	0	0	0	–		0	0	15	0
PSS Sleman	Total		50	10	0	0	0	0	0	0	50	10
Borneo Samarinda	2024–25	Liga 1	8	0	0	0	–		0	0	8	0
Barito Putera	2025–26	Championship	4	1	0	0	–		0	0	4	1
Persipura Jayapura	2026–27	Championship	1	0	0	0	–		0	0	1	0
Career total			83	14	0	0	0	0	2	0	85	14
