= Ahmad Birrul Walidain =

Indonesian footballer

Birrul Walidain
Personal information
- Full name: Ahmad Birrul Walidain
- Date of birth: 14 December 1995 (age 30)
- Place of birth: Lamongan, Indonesia
- Height: 1.77 m (5 ft 10 in)
- Position: Right-back

Team information
- Current team: Kendal Tornado
- Number: 31

Youth career
- 2013–2016: Persela Lamongan

Senior career*
Years	Team	Apps	(Gls)
2016–2021	Persela Lamongan	101	(5)
2022	Persikabo 1973	12	(0)
2022	Madura United	4	(0)
2023	Persija Jakarta	6	(0)
2023–2024	Gresik United	15	(0)
2024–2025	PSPS Pekanbaru	21	(1)
2025–2026	Garudayaksa	11	(0)
2026–	Kendal Tornado	0	(0)
- * Club domestic league appearances and goals as of 2 May 2026

Ahmad Birrul Walidain (born 14 December 1995) is an Indonesian professional footballer who plays as a right-back for Championship club Kendal Tornado.

== Club career ==
=== Persela Lamongan ===
He made his professional debut in Liga 1 on April 16, 2017, against PSM Makassar. On 27 May 2017, Birrul scored his first goal for Persela against PS TIRA in the 86th minute at the Pakansari Stadium, Bogor.

=== Persikabo 1973 ===
In 2022, Birrul signed a contract with Indonesian Liga 1 club Persikabo 1973. He made his league debut on 3 February 2022 in a match against Bali United at the Ngurah Rai Stadium, Denpasar.

=== Madura United ===
Birrul was signed for Madura United to play in Liga 1 in the 2022–23 season. He made his league debut on 19 August 2022 in a match against Dewa United at the Gelora Bangkalan Stadium, Bangkalan.

=== Persija Jakarta ===
On 29 January 2023, Birrul signed a contract with Liga 1 club Persija Jakarta from Madura United. Birrul made his league debut for the club in a 3–1 win against RANS Nusantara, coming on as a substituted Ilham Rio Fahmi.

== Career statistics ==
=== Club ===
As of match played 2 May 2026

Club	Season	League			Cup (Note: Includes Piala Indonesia)		Continental		Other (Note: Appearances in Indonesia President's Cup)		Total	
Club	Season	Division	Apps	Goals	Apps	Goals	Apps	Goals	Apps	Goals	Apps	Goals
Persela Lamongan	2017	Liga 1	26	2	0	0	–		2	0	28	2
Persela Lamongan	2018	Liga 1	28	0	0	0	–		3	0	31	0
Persela Lamongan	2019	Liga 1	30	2	2	0	–		2	0	34	2
Persela Lamongan	2020	Liga 1	1	0	0	0	–		0	0	1	0
Persela Lamongan	2021–22	Liga 1	16	1	0	0	–		4 (Note: Appearances in Menpora Cup)	0	20	1
Persela Lamongan	Total		101	5	2	0	–		11	0	114	5
Persikabo 1973	2021–22	Liga 1	12	0	0	0	–		0	0	12	0
Madura United	2022–23	Liga 1	4	0	0	0	–		1	0	5	0
Persija Jakarta	2022–23	Liga 1	6	0	0	0	–		0	0	6	0
Gresik United	2023–24	Liga 2	15	0	0	0	–		0	0	15	0
PSPS Riau	2024–25	Liga 2	21	1	0	0	–		0	0	21	1
Garudayaksa	2025–26	Championship	11	0	0	0	–		0	0	11	0
Career total			168	6	2	0	0	0	12	0	182	6

== Honours ==
Garudayaksa

- Championship: 2025–26
