= Aji Kusuma =

Indonesian footballer

Personal information
- Full name: Aji Kusuma
- Date of birth: 30 January 1999 (age 27)
- Place of birth: Bengkalis, Indonesia
- Height: 1.77 m (5 ft 10 in)
- Position: Forward

Team information
- Current team: Madura United
- Number: 99

Youth career
- 2016: KS Tiga Naga
- 2017: PS TNI
- 2017: Bali United Youth

Senior career*
Years	Team	Apps	(Gls)
2017–2018	Persika Karawang	7	(2)
2019–2023	Persiba Balikpapan	16	(4)
2023–2024	Persija Jakarta	37	(5)
2024–2025	Persita Tangerang	24	(1)
2025–	Madura United	16	(1)

International career^{‡}
2017–2018	Indonesia U19	3	(1)
Medal record
Men's football
Representing Indonesia
AFF U-19 Youth Championship
Third place	2018 Indonesia	Team
- * Club domestic league appearances and goals as of 7 February 2026 (UTC) ‡ National team caps and goals as of 6 November 2019 (UTC)

Aji Kusuma (born 30 January 1999) is an Indonesian professional footballer who plays as a forward for Madura United.

== Club career ==
=== Persika Karawang ===
In 2017, Aji signed a one-year contract with Persika Karawang from Bali United Youth, he scored in a 3–2 loss against Japan U20 in a friendly match on 27 March 2018.

=== Persiba Balikpapan ===
He was signed for Persiba Balikpapan to play in Liga 2 in the 2019 season. Aji made his league debut on 22 June 2019 in a match against PSIM Yogyakarta at the Batakan Stadium, Balikpapan. He played the full 90 minutes in the won to Persis Solo four days later.

On 20 October 2021, Aji scored his first league goal for Persiba Balikpapan from header in a 1–2 win over Persewar Waropen at Tuah Pahoe Stadium.

Aji scored in 40th minutes and give assists to Faldi Ades Tama in Persiba's 3–2 loss over Putra Delta Sidoarjo on 11 September 2022. On 22 September, Aji scored a brace for the club against Kalteng Putra, with a 5–0 victory, brought Persiba Balikpapan to 3rd place East Group.

On 12 January 2023, Persiba's management announced that Aji had officially left the club, because he had received an offer from a high-level Indonesian Liga 1 club. In his time with Persiba Balikpapan during the 2022 season he made six appearances, scoring three goals.

=== Persija Jakarta ===
On 12 January 2023, Aji signed a one-year contract with Liga 1 club Persija Jakarta from Persiba Balikpapan. Three days later, Aji made his league debut for the club in a 3–2 win against Bali United, coming on as a substituted Ginanjar Wahyu. Aji scored his first league goals in a 4–2 home win over PSM Makassar, scoring a brace, on 25 January. He added his third goals for the club on 15 April with one goal against PSS Sleman in a 5–0 home win at Gelora Bung Karno Stadium. With this victory, Persija is certain to finish in runner-up in the final standings of the 2022–23 Liga 1. He made 16 league appearances for Persija, scoring three goals, during the 2022–23 season.

== International career ==
On 25 March 2018, Aji made his debut for Indonesia U20 against Japan U20, also scored his first international goal for national team in a 4–1 loss in a friendly match. On 1 July 2018, it was reported that Aji received a call-up from the Indonesia U20 for 2018 AFF U-19 Youth Championship. On 9 July 2018, he played as a starting in a 2–1 loss against Thailand U20, in the AFF U-19 Youth Championship.

On 28 August 2023, Aji received a call-up to the Indonesia national team for a friendly match against Turkmenistan at the Gelora Bung Tomo Stadium, Surabaya.

== Career statistics ==
=== Club ===
As of match played 7 February 2026

Club	Season	League			Cup		Continental		Other		Total	
Club	Season	Division	Apps	Goals	Apps	Goals	Apps	Goals	Apps	Goals	Apps	Goals
Persika Karawang	2017	Liga 2	0	0	0	0	–		0	0	0	0
Persika Karawang	2018	Liga 2	7	2	0	0	–		0	0	7	2
Persiba Balikpapan	2019	Liga 2	5	0	0	0	–		0	0	5	0
Persiba Balikpapan	2020	Liga 2	0	0	0	0	–		0	0	0	0
Persiba Balikpapan	2021–22	Liga 2	5	1	0	0	–		0	0	5	1
Persiba Balikpapan	2022–23	Liga 2	6	3	0	0	–		0	0	6	3
Persija Jakarta	2022–23	Liga 1	16	3	0	0	–		0	0	16	3
Persija Jakarta	2023–24	Liga 1	21	2	0	0	–		0	0	21	2
Persita Tangerang	2024–25	Liga 1	24	1	0	0	–		0	0	24	1
Madura United	2025–26	Super League	16	1	0	0	–		0	0	16	1
Career total			99	13	0	0	0	0	0	0	99	13

== Honours ==
=== International ===
Indonesia U-19

- AFF U-19 Youth Championship third place: 2018
