= Steffen Kienle =

German footballer

Personal information
- Full name: Steffen Kienle
- Date of birth: 18 January 1995 (age 31)
- Place of birth: Germany
- Height: 1.85 m (6 ft 1 in)
- Position: Striker

Team information
- Current team: VfR Aalen
- Number: 24

Youth career
- SV Elchingen
- TSV Nördlingen
- –2012: SSV Ulm
- 2012–2014: VfR Aalen

Senior career*
| Years | Team | Apps | (Gls) |
| 2014–2015 | VfR Aalen II | 33 | (14) |
| 2015–2017 | VfR Aalen | 43 | (3) |
| 2017–2021 | SSV Ulm | 60 | (12) |
| 2021– | VfR Aalen | 104 | (26) |
- * Club domestic league appearances and goals as of 30 June 2026

Steffen Kienle (born 18 January 1995) is a German footballer who plays as a striker for VfR Aalen.
