= Rangga Widiansyah =

Indonesian footballer (born 2002)

Personal information
- Full name: Rangga Widiansyah
- Date of birth: 24 April 2002 (age 24)
- Place of birth: Bogor, Indonesia
- Height: 1.70 m (5 ft 7 in)
- Positions: Left-back; midfielder

Team information
- Current team: Adhyaksa Bekasi
- Number: 5

Youth career
- 2017: Villa 2000
- 2018–2020: Persija Jakarta

Senior career*
Years	Team	Apps	(Gls)
2021–2022	Persija Jakarta	9	(0)
2023–2024	Persik Kediri	10	(0)
2024–2025	Persijap Jepara	22	(0)
2025–2026	Adhyaksa Banten	16	(0)
2026–	Adhyaksa Bekasi	2	(0)
- * Club domestic league appearances and goals as of 18 September 2026 (UTC)

Rangga Widiansyah (born 24 April 2002) is an Indonesian professional footballer who plays as a left-back for Championship club Adhyaksa Bekasi.

== Club career ==
=== Persija Jakarta ===
He was signed for Persija Jakarta to play in Liga 1 in the 2021 season. Widiansyah made his first-team debut on 26 October 2021 in a match against Persebaya Surabaya at the Manahan Stadium, Surakarta.

=== Persik Kediri ===
On 13 January 2023, Rangga signed a contract with Liga 1 club Persik Kediri from Persija Jakarta. Rangga made his league debut for the club in a 2–3 win against Bhayangkara, coming on as a substitute for Agil Munawar.

== Career statistics ==
=== Club ===
As of 18 September 2026.

Club	Season	League			Cup		Continental		Other		Total	
Club	Season	Division	Apps	Goals	Apps	Goals	Apps	Goals	Apps	Goals	Apps	Goals
Persija Jakarta	2021–22	Liga 1	9	0	0	0	–		0	0	9	0
Persija Jakarta	2022–23	Liga 1	0	0	0	0	–		0	0	0	0
Persik Kediri	2022–23	Liga 1	5	0	0	0	–		0	0	5	0
Persik Kediri	2023–24	Liga 1	5	0	0	0	–		0	0	5	0
Persijap Jepara	2024–25	Liga 2	22	0	0	0	–		0	0	22	0
Adhyaksa Banten	2025–26	Championship	16	0	0	0	–		0	0	16	0
Adhyaksa Bekasi	2026–27	Championship	2	0	0	0	–		0	0	2	0
Career total			59	0	0	0	0	0	0	0	59	0

== Honours ==
Persijap Jepara

- Liga 2 Promotion play-offs: 2024–25
