= Dandi Maulana =

Indonesian footballer (born 1998)

Personal information
- Full name: Dandi Maulana Abdulhak
- Date of birth: 17 June 1998 (age 28)
- Place of birth: Pandeglang, Indonesia
- Height: 1.75 m (5 ft 9 in)
- Position: Centre-back

Team information
- Current team: Persekabpas Pasuruan

Youth career
- 2014–2016: Frenz United

Senior career*
Years	Team	Apps	(Gls)
2017–2022	Barito Putera	87	(7)
2022	Persebaya Surabaya	5	(0)
2023	Persija Jakarta	10	(0)
2023–2024	RANS Nusantara	11	(0)
2024–2025	Persekat Tegal	15	(1)
2025	PSIS Semarang	3	(0)
2026	Persekat Tegal	6	(0)
2026–	Persekabpas Pasuruan	0	(0)

International career
2013	Indonesia U16	7	(0)
2019	Indonesia U23	2	(0)
Medal record
Men's football
Representing Indonesia
AFF U-16 Youth Championship
Runner-up	2013 Myanmar
- * Club domestic league appearances and goals as of 2 May 2026

Dandi Maulana Abdulhak (born 17 June 1998) is an Indonesian professional footballer who plays as a centre-back for Liga Nusantara club Persekabpas Pasuruan.

== Club career ==
=== Barito Putera ===
He was signed for Barito Putera to play in Liga 1 in the 2017 season. Dandi made his debut on 22 April 2017 in a match against Persija Jakarta in the Liga 1. On 30 May 2017, Dandi scored his first goal for Barito Putera against Persipura Jayapura in the 31st minute at the Mandala Stadium, Jayapura.

=== Persebaya Surabaya ===
Dandi was signed for Persebaya Surabaya to play in Liga 1 in the 2022–23 season. He made his league debut on 25 July 2022 in a match against Persikabo 1973 at the Pakansari Stadium, Cibinong.

=== Persija Jakarta ===
Dandi Maulana became Persija Jakarta's first recruit in half of the 2022–23 Liga 1. Dandi made his debut on 15 January 2023 in a match against Bali United at the Patriot Candrabaga Stadium, Bekasi.

== Career statistics ==
=== Club ===
As of 2 May 2026

Club	Season	League			Cup		Continental		Other (Note: Appearances in Indonesia President's Cup)		Total	
Club	Season	Division	Apps	Goals	Apps	Goals	Apps	Goals	Apps	Goals	Apps	Goals
Barito Putera	2017	Liga 1	26	4	0	0	–		0	0	26	4
Barito Putera	2018	Liga 1	23	2	0	0	–		3	0	26	2
Barito Putera	2019	Liga 1	22	0	0	0	–		1	0	23	0
Barito Putera	2020	Liga 1	2	0	0	0	–		0	0	2	0
Barito Putera	2021–22	Liga 1	14	1	0	0	–		1 (Note: Appearances in Menpora Cup)	0	15	1
Barito Putera	Total		87	7	0	0	–		5	0	92	7
Persebaya Surabaya	2022–23	Liga 1	5	0	0	0	–		3	0	8	0
Persija Jakarta	2022–23	Liga 1	10	0	0	0	–		0	0	10	0
Persija Jakarta	2023–24	Liga 1	0	0	0	0	–		0	0	0	0
Persija Jakarta	Total		10	0	0	0	–		0	0	10	0
RANS Nusantara	2023–24	Liga 1	11	0	0	0	–		0	0	11	0
Persekat Tegal	2024–25	Liga 2	15	1	0	0	–		0	0	15	1
PSIS Semarang	2025–26	Championship	3	0	0	0	–		0	0	3	0
Persekat Tegal	2025–26	Championship	6	0	0	0	–		0	0	6	0
Career total			137	9	0	0	0	0	8	0	145	9

== Honours ==
=== International ===
Indonesia U16

- AFF U-16 Youth Championship runner-up: 2013
