= Alfriyanto Nico =

Indonesian footballer

Personal information
- Full name: Alfriyanto Nico Saputro
- Date of birth: 3 April 2003 (age 23)
- Place of birth: Surakarta, Indonesia
- Height: 1.72 m (5 ft 8 in)
- Positions: Winger; right-back

Team information
- Current team: Garudayaksa
- Number: 56

Youth career
- 2018: Persis Solo
- 2019–2021: Persija Jakarta
- 2019–2020: Garuda Select

Senior career*
Years	Team	Apps	(Gls)
2021–2026	Persija Jakarta	48	(4)
2023–2024	→ PSIM Yogyakarta (loan)	5	(1)
2024–2025	→ Dewa United (loan)	24	(0)
2026	→ Persis Solo (loan)	11	(0)
2026–	Garudayaksa	0	(0)

International career^{‡}
2022–2023	Indonesia U20	18	(3)
2024	Indonesia	1	(0)
- * Club domestic league appearances and goals as of 23 May 2026 (UTC) ‡ National team caps and goals as of 9 December 2024 (UTC)

Alfriyanto Nico Saputro (born 3 April 2003) is an Indonesian professional footballer who plays as a winger or right-back for Super League club Garudayaksa.

== Club career ==
=== Persija Jakarta ===
He was signed for Persija Jakarta to play in Indonesian Super League in the 2021 season. Nico made his first-team debut on 5 September 2021 in a match against PSS Sleman. On 24 September 2021, Nico scored his first goal for Persija in a 2–1 win over Persela Lamongan at the Pakansari Stadium, Bogor.

Through this goal, Nico is listed as the youngest goalscorer in 2021-22 Liga 1 at the age of 18 years five months 21 days, for Nico, his goal is an indicator that Persija's young players are able to make a big contribution to the team.

== International career ==
On 30 May 2022, Nico made his debut for an Indonesian youth team against a Venezuela U-20 squad in the 2022 Maurice Revello Tournament in France. In October 2022, it was reported that Nico received a call-up from the Indonesia U-20 for a training camp, in Turkey and Spain.

On 25 November 2024, Nico received a called up to the Indonesia national team preliminary squad for the 2024 ASEAN Championship. He made his debut against Myanmar in a 1–0 victory.

== Career statistics ==
=== Club ===
As of 23 May 2026.

Club	Season	League			Cup		Continental		Other		Total	
Club	Season	Division	Apps	Goals	Apps	Goals	Apps	Goals	Apps	Goals	Apps	Goals
Persija Jakarta	2021–22	Liga 1	18	3	0	0	–		7 (Note: Appearances in Menpora Cup.)	0	25	3
Persija Jakarta	2022–23	Liga 1	19	1	0	0	–		0	0	19	1
Persija Jakarta	2023–24	Liga 1	6	0	0	0	–		0	0	6	0
Persija Jakarta	2025–26	Super League	5	0	0	0	–		0	0	5	0
PSIM Yogyakarta (loan)	2023–24	Liga 2	5	1	0	0	–		0	0	5	1
Dewa United (loan)	2024–25	Liga 1	24	0	0	0	–		0	0	24	0
Persis Solo (loan)	2025–26	Super League	11	0	0	0	–		0	0	11	0
Career total			88	5	0	0	0	0	7	0	95	5

=== International ===
As of match played 9 December 2024

Appearances and goals by national team and year
National team	Year	Apps	Goals
Indonesia	2024	1	0
Total		1	0

=== International goals ===
International under-19 goals

No.	Date	Venue	Opponent	Score	Result	Competition
1.	4 July 2022	Patriot Candrabhaga Stadium, Bekasi, Indonesia	Brunei	7–0	7–0	2022 AFF U-19 Youth Championship
2.	8 July 2022	Patriot Candrabhaga Stadium, Bekasi, Indonesia	Philippines	2–0	5–1	2022 AFF U-19 Youth Championship
3.	16 September 2022	Gelora Bung Tomo Stadium, Surabaya, Indonesia	Hong Kong	2–0	5–1	2023 AFC U-20 Asian Cup qualification

== Honours ==
Persija Jakarta

- Menpora Cup: 2021

Individual

- Liga 1 Young Player of the Month: October 2021
