= Michael Krmenčík =

Czech footballer (born 1993)

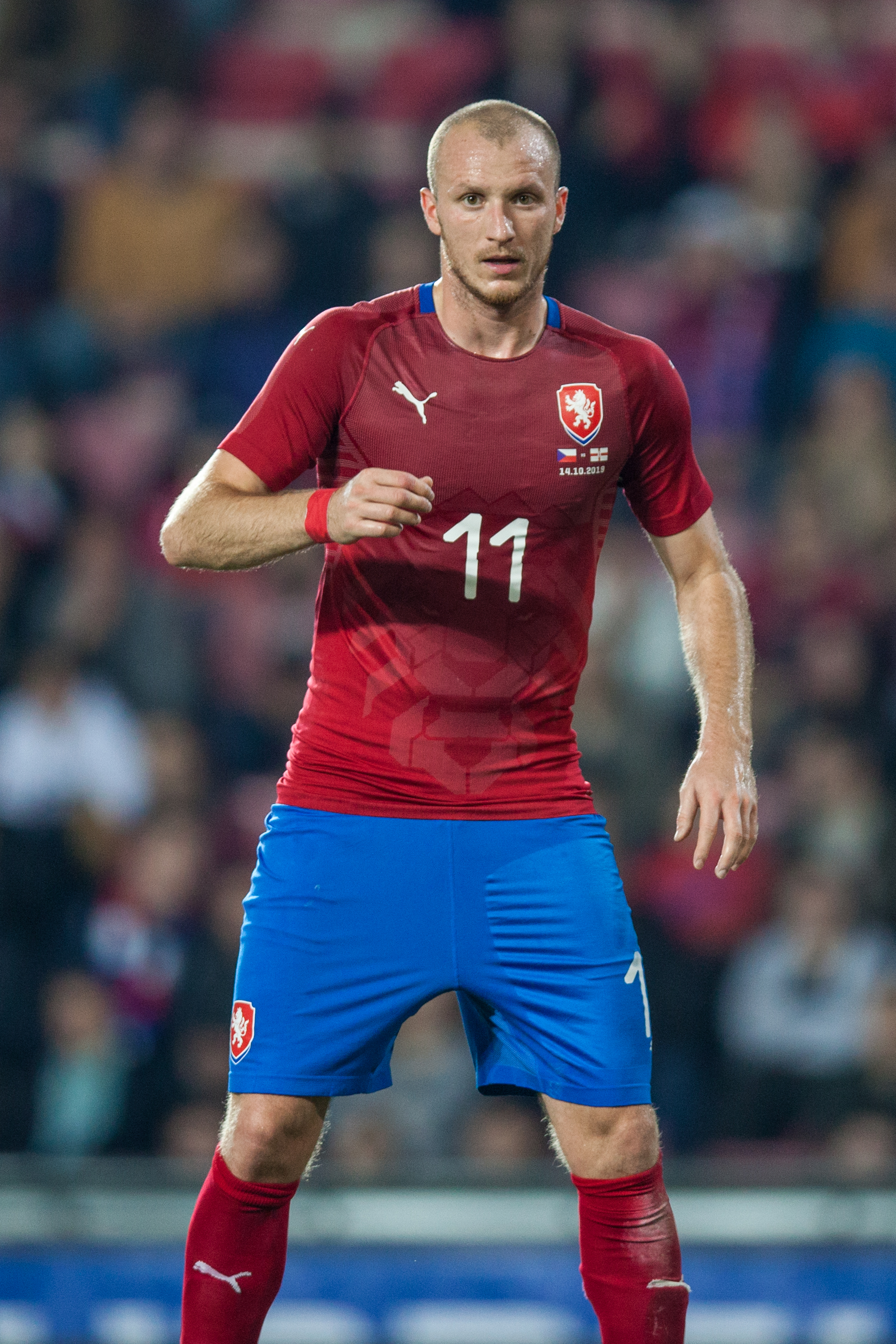
- Krmenčík with Czech Republic in 2019

Personal information
- Full name: Michael Krmenčík
- Date of birth: 15 March 1993 (age 33)
- Place of birth: Kraslice, Czech Republic
- Height: 1.91 m (6 ft 3 in)
- Position: Forward

Youth career
- TJ Kraslice
- Baník Sokolov
- Viktoria Plzeň

Senior career*
| Years | Team | Apps | (Gls) |
| 2011–2020 | Viktoria Plzeň | 91 | (45) |
| 2012 | → Baník Sokolov (loan) | 12 | (1) |
| 2012–2013 | → Zenit Čáslav (loan) | 20 | (1) |
| 2013 | → Vlašim (loan) | 12 | (1) |
| 2014 | → Baník Ostrava (loan) | 11 | (2) |
| 2014–2015 | → Dukla Prague (loan) | 25 | (8) |
| 2020–2022 | Club Brugge | 15 | (3) |
| 2021 | → PAOK (loan) | 22 | (4) |
| 2021–2022 | → Slavia Prague (loan) | 14 | (4) |
| 2022–2023 | Persija Jakarta | 23 | (10) |
| 2023–2024 | Apollon Limassol | 27 | (2) |
| 2024–2026 | Slovácko | 52 | (4) |
| Total | | 324 | (85) |

International career^{‡}
| 2010–2011 | Czech Republic U18 | 6 | (3) |
| 2011–2012 | Czech Republic U19 | 11 | (1) |
| 2013 | Czech Republic U20 | 3 | (0) |
| 2013–2014 | Czech Republic U21 | 8 | (3) |
| 2016–2021 | Czech Republic | 35 | (9) |
- * Club domestic league appearances and goals as of 25 May 2026 ‡ National team caps and goals as of 14 June 2021

Michael Krmenčík (born 15 March 1993) is a Czech former footballer who last played as a forward for Czech First League club Slovácko and the Czech Republic national team.

== Club career ==
=== Early club career ===
In 2011, Krmenčík was promoted to the first team and in April of the same year he made his debut in a game against Příbram. In the 2011–12 season, he went on loan to Banik Sokolov, scoring his first professional goal.

In the following four seasons, Krmenčík went on loan spells at Zenit Čáslav, Vlašim, Baník Ostrava and Dukla Prague in the Czech leagues. He returned to Viktoria Plzeň in the second half of the 2015-16 season and his career began to gain momentum. Krmenčík scored three times in nine games, winning a place in the team's starting XI.

=== Viktoria Plzeň ===
By January 2020, Krmenčík managed to impress many playing for Viktoria Plzeň. In 124 matches, he scored 62 goals, made 16 assists and won four trophies. He was also the league's top scorer in the 2017–18 season.

A ligament rupture in the 2018–19 season kept him out of action for a long time, but he remained impressive when he returned. His displays convinced Club Brugge of his potential.

=== Club Brugge ===
In January 2020, Club Brugge spent €6 million to make Krmenčík their own. He signed a three-and-a-half-year contract with the Belgian club.

==== Loan to PAOK ====
On 5 January 2021, PAOK announced that they reached an agreement with Club Brugge for the loan of Krmenčík until the end of the 2020–21 season. On 22 May 2021, Krmenčík scored in the last minute of Greek Cup Final, sealing a 2–1 win against league champions Olympiacos.

==== Loan to Slavia Prague ====
On 23 July 2021, Slavia Prague announced that Krmenčík would be joining the club on a season-long loan with an obligation to make the transfer permanent if Slavia qualified for the group stage of the UEFA Champions League.

=== Persija Jakarta ===
In June 2022, Krmenčík joined Indonesian Liga 1 side Persija Jakarta. On 23 July 2022, He made his league debut by starting in a 0–1 loss against Bali United.

=== Slovácko ===
On 14 August 2024, Krmenčík signed a two-year contract with Czech First League club Slovácko.

== International career ==
In 2016, Krmenčík received his first call-up for the Czech senior squad in a UEFA Euro 2016 qualifying match against Norway on 11 November, which he also marked his debut with an opening goal.

== Career statistics ==
=== Club ===
As of 15 April 2023

| Club | Season | League | | | Cup | | Continental | | Other | | Total | |
| Club | Season | Division | Apps | Goals | Apps | Goals | Apps | Goals | Apps | Goals | Apps | Goals |
|---|---|---|---|---|---|---|---|---|---|---|---|---|
| Viktoria Plzeň | 2010–11 | Czech First League | 1 | 0 | — | | — | | — | | 1 | 0 |
| Viktoria Plzeň | 2011–12 | Czech First League | 0 | 0 | 0 | 0 | 0 | 0 | 1 | 0 | 1 | 0 |
| Viktoria Plzeň | 2015–16 | Czech First League | 7 | 2 | 3 | 1 | — | | — | | 10 | 3 |
| Viktoria Plzeň | 2016–17 | Czech First League | 26 | 10 | 1 | 1 | 10 | 2 | — | | 37 | 13 |
| Viktoria Plzeň | 2017–18 | Czech First League | 24 | 16 | 0 | 0 | 10 | 6 | — | | 34 | 22 |
| Viktoria Plzeň | 2018–19 | Czech First League | 13 | 7 | 0 | 0 | 3 | 2 | — | | 16 | 9 |
| Viktoria Plzeň | 2019–20 | Czech First League | 20 | 10 | 1 | 3 | 4 | 2 | — | | 25 | 15 |
| Viktoria Plzeň | Total | | 91 | 45 | 5 | 5 | 27 | 12 | 1 | 0 | 124 | 62 |
| Baník Sokolov (loan) | 2011–12 | Czech National Football League | 12 | 1 | 0 | 0 | — | | — | | 12 | 1 |
| Zenit Čáslav (loan) | 2012–13 | Czech National Football League | 20 | 1 | 0 | 0 | — | | — | | 20 | 1 |
| Vlašim (loan) | 2013–14 | Czech National Football League | 12 | 1 | 2 | 4 | — | | — | | 14 | 5 |
| Baník Ostrava (loan) | 2013–14 | Czech First League | 11 | 2 | — | | — | | — | | 11 | 2 |
| Dukla Prague (loan) | 2014–15 | Czech First League | 13 | 3 | 1 | 0 | — | | — | | 14 | 3 |
| Dukla Prague (loan) | 2015–16 | Czech First League | 12 | 5 | 4 | 2 | — | | — | | 16 | 7 |
| Dukla Prague (loan) | Total | | 25 | 8 | 5 | 2 | — | | — | | 30 | 10 |
| Club Brugge | 2019–20 | Belgian First Division A | 6 | 0 | 1 | 0 | 0 | 0 | — | | 7 | 0 |
| Club Brugge | 2020–21 | Belgian First Division A | 9 | 3 | 0 | 0 | 3 | 0 | — | | 12 | 3 |
| Club Brugge | Total | | 15 | 3 | 1 | 0 | 3 | 0 | 0 | 0 | 19 | 3 |
| PAOK (loan) | 2020–21 | Super League Greece | 22 | 4 | 6 | 5 | — | | — | | 28 | 9 |
| Slavia Prague (loan) | 2021–22 | Czech First League | 10 | 4 | 1 | 0 | 5 | 0 | — | | 16 | 4 |
| Persija Jakarta | 2022–23 | Liga 1 | 23 | 10 | 0 | 0 | — | | 0 | 0 | 23 | 10 |
| Career total | | | 240 | 76 | 20 | 16 | 35 | 12 | 1 | 0 | 296 | 104 |

=== International ===
Scores and results list the Czech Republic's goal tally first, score column indicates score after each Krmenčík goal.

List of international goals scored by Michael Krmenčík
| No. | Date | Venue | Opponent | Score | Result | Competition |
|---|---|---|---|---|---|---|
| 1 | 11 November 2016 | Eden Arena, Prague, Czech Republic | Norway | 1–0 | 2–1 | 2018 FIFA World Cup qualification |
| 2 | 22 March 2017 | Městský stadion, Ústí nad Labem, Czech Republic | Lithuania | 3–0 | 3–0 | Friendly |
| 3 | 26 March 2017 | San Marino Stadium, Serravalle, San Marino | San Marino | 5–0 | 6–0 | 2018 FIFA World Cup qualification |
| 4 | 6 June 2017 | King Baudouin Stadium, Brussels, Belgium | Belgium | 1–1 | 1–2 | Friendly |
| 5 | 8 October 2017 | Doosan Arena, Plzeň, Czech Republic | San Marino | 1–0 | 5–0 | 2018 FIFA World Cup qualification |
| 6 | 8 October 2017 | Doosan Arena, Plzeň, Czech Republic | San Marino | 2–0 | 5–0 | 2018 FIFA World Cup qualification |
| 7 | 26 March 2018 | Guangxi Sports Center, Nanning, China | China | 3–1 | 4–1 | 2018 China Cup |
| 8 | 13 October 2018 | Štadión Antona Malatinského, Trnava, Slovakia | Slovakia | 1–0 | 2–1 | 2018–19 UEFA Nations League B |
| 9 | 4 September 2020 | Národný futbalový štadión, Bratislava, Slovakia | Slovakia | 3–1 | 3–1 | 2020–21 UEFA Nations League B |

== Honours ==
Viktoria Plzeň

- Czech First League: 2010–11, 2015–16, 2017–18

Club Brugge

- Belgian First Division A: 2019–20

PAOK

- Greek Cup: 2020–21

Individual

- Czech First League Top Scorer: 2017–18
- Greek Cup top scorer: 2020–21
