= Barnabas Sobor =

Indonesian footballer

Personal information
- Full name: Barnabas Sobor
- Date of birth: 13 February 2003 (age 23)
- Place of birth: Jayapura, Indonesia
- Height: 1.80 m (5 ft 11 in)
- Position: Centre-back

Team information
- Current team: Karketu Dili
- Number: 26

Youth career
- 2016–2017: Papua United
- 2017–2018: Persidafon Dafonsoro
- 2019–2020: Persipura Jayapura

Senior career*
Years	Team	Apps	(Gls)
2021–2022	Persewangi Banyuwangi	7	(0)
2022–2023	Persija Jakarta	0	(0)
2022	→ PSPS Riau (loan)	3	(0)
2023	→ Riteriai B (loan)	0	(0)
2023	Kalteng Putra	0	(0)
2023–2024	PSIS Semarang	3	(0)
2024	PSBS Biak	1	(0)
2025	Persibo Bojonegoro	1	(0)
2025	Persinab Nabire	4	(0)
2026–	Karketu Dili	9	(0)

International career
2022	Indonesia U20	2	(0)
- * Club domestic league appearances and goals as of 21 July 2026

Barnabas Sobor (born 13 February 2003) is an Indonesian professional footballer who plays as a centre-back for Liga Futebol Timor-Leste Primeira Divisão club Karketu Dili.

== Early life ==
Sobor was born on 13 February 2003 in Jayapura, Papua.

== Club career ==
As a youth player, Sobor joined the youth academy of Papua United.

In 2026 Barnabas joined Timor-Leste club Karketu Dili, in preparation for their AFC Challenge League participation.

== International career ==
Sobor has represented Indonesia internationally at youth level. On 16 September 2022, Sobor made his debut for Indonesia U-20 national team against Hong Kong U20, in a 5–1 win in the 2023 AFC U-20 Asian Cup qualification.

In October 2022, it was reported that Sobor received a call-up from the Indonesia U20 for a training camp, in Turkey and Spain.
