= Syahrian Abimanyu =

Indonesian footballer (born 1999)

Personal information
- Full name: Syahrian Abimanyu
- Date of birth: 25 April 1999 (age 27)
- Place of birth: Banjarnegara, Indonesia
- Height: 1.71 m (5 ft 7 in)
- Position: Midfielder

Team information
- Current team: PSIS Semarang
- Number: 8

Youth career
- Real Betis
- Jakarta Football Academy
- 2016–2017: Atlético Levante
- 2017: Persija Jakarta

Senior career*
Years	Team	Apps	(Gls)
2017–2019	Sriwijaya	8	(1)
2019–2020	Madura United	20	(0)
2021–2022	Johor Darul Ta'zim	2	(0)
2021	→ Newcastle Jets (loan)	3	(0)
2022–2025	Persija Jakarta	78	(2)
2025–2026	Persik Kediri	11	(0)
2026–	PSIS Semarang	4	(0)

International career
2013	Indonesia U16	2	(1)
2016–2018	Indonesia U19	18	(2)
2019–2023	Indonesia U23	18	(0)
2021–2023	Indonesia	12	(1)
Medal record
Men's football
Representing Indonesia
AFF U-16 Youth Championship
Runner-up	2013 Myanmar
AFF U-19 Youth Championship
Third place	2017 Myanmar
Third place	2018 Indonesia	Team
Southeast Asian Games
Silver medal – second place	2019 Philippines	Team
Bronze medal – third place	2021 Vietnam	Team
AFF Championship
Runner-up	2020 Singapore	Team
- * Club domestic league appearances and goals as of 25 October 2026

Syahrian Abimanyu (born 25 April 1999) is an Indonesian professional footballer who plays as a midfielder for Championship club PSIS Semarang.

== Club career ==
=== Early career ===
Abimanyu started his football career with SSB Jaya Mandiri Bogor soccer school. In 2016, he was sent to Levante in Spain to train with its youth squads.

=== Sriwijaya FC ===
In 2017, Sriwijaya recruited Abimanyu for the 2018 Liga 1 competition but failed to prevent the club from avoiding relegation.

=== Madura United ===
Nonetheless, Madura United signed him to play in the 2019 Liga 1 season. Abimanyu developed into a midfielder with playmaking abilities and precise crosses, winning him attention from Indonesia national under-23 football team coach Indra Sjafri who was preparing a squad for the 2019 Southeast Asian Games in the Philippines. This team went all the way to the final, with Abimanyu at the center of the midfield, before losing to Vietnam.

=== Johor Darul Ta'zim F.C. ===
Abimanyu found limited time to play and develop his skills in 2020 after the 2020 Liga 1 season was canceled after three matches due to the COVID-19 pandemic. In December 2020, Malaysian Super League giant Johor Darul Ta'zim announced it has signed him on a long-term contract with a possibility of loaning him in his first year.

==== Newcastle Jets (loan) ====
On 5 February 2021, Johor Darul Ta'zim announced that Abimanyu has been loaned to top-flight Australian club Newcastle Jets for the remainder of the 2020-21 A-League season. On 5 April 2021, Abimanyu made his A-League debut as a 89th-minute substitute for Matthew Millar in a 0–1 defeat to Western United On 2 June 2021, his parent club Johor Darul Ta'zim announced his return for the remaining of the 2021 season following the end of a short-term loan stint with Newcastle Jets.

==== Return to Johor Darul Ta'zim ====
After finishing his loan spell at Australia, Syahrian starts to training with the first team but his suffered light injury but he managed to recovered. On 8 August, Syahrian makes his debut in Malaysia Super League on 76th minute replacing Malaysia veteran Safiq Rahim.

=== Persija Jakarta ===
On 12 January 2022, Johor Darul Ta'zim and Persija Jakarta has agreed to an undisclosed fee to sign Abimanyu on a two-year contract until 2024. He made his league debut on 5 February 2022 in a match against Arema at the Kapten I Wayan Dipta Stadium, Gianyar. On 10 March 2022, Abimanyu scored his first league goal for Persija in a 1–2 lose over Borneo Samarinda at the Kapten I Wayan Dipta Stadium.

== International career ==
In 2018, Abimanyu represented the Indonesia U-19, in the 2018 AFC U-19 Championship. He also played for the Indonesia team that won silver in the 2019 Southeast Asian Games. He received a call up to the senior Indonesia national football team in May 2021. He earned his first senior cap in a 25 May 2021 friendly match in Dubai against Afghanistan.

On 26 December 2022, Abimanyu scored his first goal for the national team, against Brunei in the 2022 AFF Championship tournament.

== Career statistics ==
=== Club ===
As of 25 October 2026

Club	Season	League			Cup		Continental		Other		Total	
Club	Season	Division	Apps	Goals	Apps	Goals	Apps	Goals	Apps	Goals	Apps	Goals
Sriwijaya	2018	Liga 1	8	0	0	0	—		7 (Note: Appearances in Indonesia President's Cup)	1	15	1
Madura United	2019	Liga 1	17	0	0	0	—		0	0	17	0
Madura United	2020	Liga 1	3	0	0	0	—		0	0	3	0
Madura United	Total		20	0	0	0	0	0	0	0	20	0
Johor Darul Ta'zim	2021	Malaysia Super League	2	0	0	0	0	0	1 (Note: Appearances in Malaysia Cup)	0	3	0
Newcastle Jets (loan)	2020–21	A-League	3	0	0	0	—		0	0	3	0
Persija Jakarta	2021–22	Liga 1	11	1	0	0	—		0	0	11	1
Persija Jakarta	2022–23	Liga 1	21	0	0	0	—		0	0	21	0
Persija Jakarta	2023–24	Liga 1	25	1	0	0	—		0	0	25	1
Persija Jakarta	2024–25	Liga 1	21	0	0	0	—		0	0	21	0
Persija Jakarta	Total		78	2	0	0	0	0	0	0	78	2
Persik Kediri	2025–26	Super League	11	0	0	0	—		0	0	11	0
PSIS Semarang	2026–27	Championship	4	0	0	0	—		0	0	4	0
Career total			126	2	0	0	0	0	8	1	134	3

=== International ===
As of match played 25 March 2023

Appearances and goals by national team and year
National team	Year	Apps	Goals
Indonesia	2021	8	0
Indonesia	2022	3	1
Indonesia	2023	1	0
Total		12	1

=== International goals ===
No.	Date	Venue	Opponent	Score	Result	Competition
1.	26 December 2022	Kuala Lumpur Stadium, Kuala Lumpur, Malaysia	Brunei	1–0	7–0	2022 AFF Championship

== Honours ==
=== Club ===
Sriwijaya

- President's Cup third place: 2018
- East Kalimantan Governor Cup: 2018

Johor Darul Ta'zim

- Malaysia Super League: 2021

=== International ===
Indonesia U-16

- AFF U-16 Youth Championship runner-up: 2013

Indonesia U-19

- AFF U-19 Youth Championship third place: 2017, 2018

Indonesia U-23

- SEA Games silver medal: 2019; bronze medal: 2021

Indonesia

- AFF Championship runner-up: 2020
