= Ginanjar Wahyu =

Indonesian footballer

Personal information
- Full name: Ginanjar Wahyu Ramadhani
- Date of birth: 20 November 2003 (age 22)
- Place of birth: Bandung, Indonesia
- Height: 1.79 m (5 ft 10 in)
- Position: Forward

Team information
- Current team: Bhayangkara
- Number: 22

Youth career
- 2019–2020: Inspire Academy
- 2021: Bhayangkara
- 2022–2023: Persija Jakarta

Senior career*
Years	Team	Apps	(Gls)
2022–2024	Persija Jakarta	18	(1)
2023–2024	→ Arema (loan)	18	(1)
2024–	Bhayangkara	12	(1)

International career
2022–2023	Indonesia U20	8	(0)
- * Club domestic league appearances and goals as of 1 November 2025 (UTC)

Ginanjar Wahyu Ramadhani (born 20 November 2003), simply known as Ginanjar, is an Indonesian professional footballer who plays as a forward for Super League club Bhayangkara.

== Club career ==
=== Persija Jakarta ===
After starting his career at Inspire Academy and joined Bhayangkara youth team for 6 months, he joined Persija Jakarta on 1 January 2022, started from the youth team and was promoted to the senior squad on 1 July 2022. On 23 July 2022, Ginanjar made his first-team debut by being starting player in a 1–0 loss match against Bali United at Kapten I Wayan Dipta Stadium.

On 8 January 2023, Ginanjar scored his first league goal for Persija against PSS Sleman as his team won 2–0.

==== Loan to Arema ====
Ginanjar was signed for Arema to play in Liga 1 in the 2023–24 season, on loan from Persija Jakarta. He made his debut on 2 July 2023 in a match against Dewa United at the Indomilk Arena, Tangerang.

On 1 September 2023, Ginanjar scored his first league goal for Arema against Bhayangkara as his team won 2–0.

== International career ==
On 14 September 2022, Ginanjar made his debut for Indonesia U-20 national team against Timor-Leste U-20, in a 4–0 win in the 2023 AFC U-20 Asian Cup qualification. In October 2022, it was reported that Ginanjar received a call-up from the Indonesia U-20 for a training camp, in Turkey and Spain.

== Career statistics ==
=== Club ===
As of 1 November 2025

Club	Season	League			Cup		Continental		Other		Total	
Club	Season	Division	Apps	Goals	Apps	Goals	Apps	Goals	Apps	Goals	Apps	Goals
Persija Jakarta	2022–23	Liga 1	18	1	0	0	—		4 (Note: Appearances in Indonesia President's Cup)	0	22	1
Arema (loan)	2023–24	Liga 1	18	1	0	0	—		0	0	18	1
Bhayangkara	2024–25	Liga 2	8	0	0	0	—		0	0	8	0
Bhayangkara	2025–26	Super League	4	1	0	0	–		0	0	4	1
Career total			48	3	0	0	0	0	4	0	52	3

== Honours ==
Bhayangkara

- Liga 2 runner-up: 2024–25
