= Wang Bohao =

Chinese footballer (born 2005)

Personal information
- Full name: Wang Bohao
- Date of birth: 18 July 2005 (age 21)
- Place of birth: Xiangfan, Hubei, China
- Height: 1.87 m (6 ft 2 in)
- Positions: Defensive midfielder; forward

Team information
- Current team: Den Bosch (on loan from Shaanxi Union)
- Number: 16

Youth career
- Hubei FA
- Yunnan Haiyifeng
- –2023: Guangzhou FC

Senior career*
Years	Team	Apps	(Gls)
2023	Yunnan Jin Dal Lae	5	(1)
2023–2024	Yanbian Longding	28	(1)
2025–	Shaanxi Union	12	(0)
2025–2026	→ Den Bosch (loan)	17	(0)
2026–	→ Den Bosch (loan)	10	(0)

International career^{‡}
2025–	China U23	9	(0)
Medal record
Men's football
Representing China
AFC U-23 Asian Cup
Runner-up	2026 Saudi Arabia	Team
- * Club domestic league appearances and goals as of 9 August 2026 ‡ National team caps and goals as of 24 January 2026

Wang Bohao (Chinese: 王博豪; pinyin: Wáng Bóháo; born 18 July 2005) is a Chinese professional footballer who plays as a defensive midfielder or forward for Eerste Divisie club Den Bosch, on loan from China League One club Shaanxi Union.

== Club career ==
=== Early career ===
Wang Bohao was born as a single child in the Fancheng District of Xiangfan, Hubei. At the age of ten, he started his football career at the Hubei Football Association youth team, a two-hour train ride from his hometown, and graduated from the Evergrande Football School youth academy of Guangzhou FC. In 2023, he joined Chinese Champions League club Yunnan Jin Dal Lae, and was given to wear the number 13. He made five appearances for the club in the 2023 Chinese Champions League, including three starts and two substitute appearances, and scored his only goal for Yunnan Jin Dal Lae with a diving header in a match against Yichun Wiser Juniors on 15 June 2023.

In July 2023, Wang joined China League One club Yanbian Longding on a free transfer, along with his Yunnan Jin Dal Lae teammate Zhang Yibao. He was given the number 36 shirt. He made his debut for Yanbian Longding on 22 July 2023, coming on as a 74th-minute substitute for Li Long in a 2–2 draw to Qingdao West Coast. In the 2023 season, Wang Bohao totalled fifteen appearances in China League One. On 13 April 2024, Wang scored his first goal for the club in a 1–0 home league win against Shijiazhuang Gongfu. After the conclusion of the 2024 season, he made thirteen league appearances and one 2024 Chinese FA Cup appearance.

=== Shaanxi Union ===
On 30 January 2025, Wang joined China League One newcomers Shaanxi Union as a free agent. He chose to wear the number 16. In a preseason friendly against Guangxi Hengchen in March 2025, Wang was involved in an out-of-control pitchside brawl, and as a result, he was suspended for two matches jointly by the Shaanxi Football Association and the Chinese Football Association. After serving his suspension, he made his first appearance for Shaanxi Union in a 2–1 away loss to Foshan Nanshi on 6 April, replacing Ruan Jun in the 78th minute.

==== Den Bosch loan ====
In a press conference on 1 August 2025, Shaanxi Union head coach Giovanni Franken revealed that Wang would be leaving the club to join Dutch side Den Bosch. On 14 August 2025, Den Bosch announced that Wang has joined the Eerste Divisie club on a one-year loan from Shaanxi Union. On 29 August 2025, Wang made his debut for Den Bosch in a 3–1 away defeat to Emmen, coming on as a 76th-minute substitute for Zaid El Bakkali. In his second match for Den Bosch, he provided an assist for Denzel Kuijpers as a substitute to seal a 4–2 away victory against MVV on 16 September. On 6 October, Wang made his first start for Den Bosch in a 2–1 league win away at Vitesse, as a replacement for regular starter Kevin Felida, who was away on international duty.

On 20 July 2026, Den Bosch announced that they have extended Wang's loan for another season.

== International career ==
On 19 January 2024, Wang Bohao was selected by the China U19 for a two-week training camp. On 17 May of the same year, he was once again selected by the China U19 for another training camp.

In November 2025, Wang was called up to the China U22 to play in the 2025 Panda Cup. On 12 November, he made his debut in a 1–0 defeat to Vietnam.

== Personal life ==
From attending Spanish lectures in China, Wang Bohao has taken on a foreign nickname, Mateo. In addition to his native Chinese, Wang is also able to communicate in Spanish and English.

== Career statistics ==
=== Club ===
As of match played 8 August 2026

Appearances and goals by club, season, and competition
Club	Season	League			Cup (Note: Includes Chinese FA Cup, KNVB Cup)		Continental		Other		Total	
Club	Season	Division	Apps	Goals	Apps	Goals	Apps	Goals	Apps	Goals	Apps	Goals
Yunnan Jin Dal Lae	2023	CMCL	5	1	–		–		–		5	1
Yanbian Longding	2023	China League One	15	0	0	0	–		–		15	0
Yanbian Longding	2024	China League One	13	1	1	0	–		–		14	1
Yanbian Longding	Total		28	1	1	0	0	0	0	0	29	1
Shaanxi Union	2025	China League One	12	0	2	0	–		–		14	0
Den Bosch (loan)	2025–26	Eerste Divisie	17	0	2	0	–		–		19	0
Den Bosch (loan)	2026–27	Eerste Divisie	1	0	0	0	–		–		1	0
Den Bosch (loan)	Total		18	0	2	0	0	0	0	0	20	0
Career total			63	2	5	0	0	0	0	0	68	2

== Honours ==
China U23

- AFC U-23 Asian Cup runner-up: 2026
