= 2022 AFC U-23 Asian Cup final =

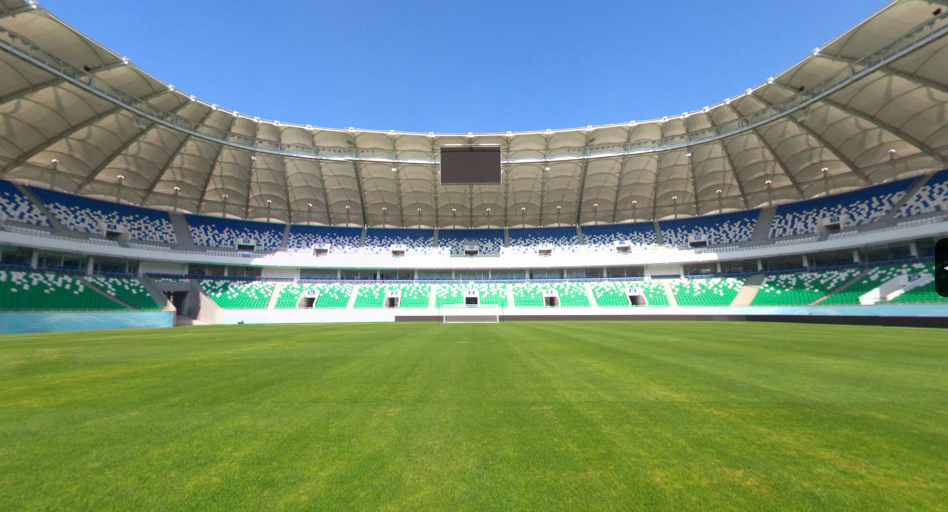
- Milliy Stadium in Tashkent hosted the final.
- Event: 2022 AFC U-23 Asian Cup
Uzbekistan	Saudi Arabia
(Uzbekistan)	(Saudi Arabia)
0	2
- Date: 19 June 2022
- Venue: Milliy Stadium, Tashkent
- Referee: Salman Falahi (Qatar)
- Weather: Clear; 29 °C (84 °F)

The 2022 AFC U-23 Asian Cup final was a football match that took place on 19 June 2022 at the Milliy Stadium in Tashkent, Uzbekistan, to determine the winners of the 2022 AFC U-23 Asian Cup. The match was contested by Uzbekistan and Saudi Arabia, the winners of the semi-finals.

Saudi Arabia beat hosts Uzbekistan and took their first trophy in the contest.

== Route to the final ==
Uzbekistan
Round
Saudi Arabia
Opponents
Result
Group stage
Opponents
Result
Turkmenistan
1–0
Match 1
Tajikistan
5–0
Qatar
6–0
Match 2
Japan
0–0
Iran
1–1
Match 3
United Arab Emirates
2–0
Group A Winner

Pos	Team	Pld	Pts
1	Uzbekistan	3	7
2	Turkmenistan	3	4
3	Iran	3	2
4	Qatar	3	2

Source: AFC
Final standings
Group D Winner

Pos	Team	Pld	Pts
1	Saudi Arabia	3	7
2	Japan	3	7
3	United Arab Emirates	3	3
4	Tajikistan	3	0

Source: AFC
Opponents
Result
Knockout stage
Opponents
Result
Iraq
2–2 (a.e.t.) (3–2 p)
Quarter-finals
Vietnam
2–0
Japan
2–0
Semi-finals
Australia
2–0

== Match ==
19 June 2022
18:00

Uzbekistan	0–2	Saudi Arabia
	Report	A. Al-Ghamdi 48'; Al-Buraikan 74'

Milliy Stadium, Tashkent
Attendance: 32,268
Referee: Salman Ahmad Falahi (Qatar)

Uzbekistan	Saudi Arabia

GK	12	Vladimir Nazarov
RB	2	Saidazamat Mirsaidov	(yellow card) 52'	(substituted off) 57'
CB	18	Alibek Davronov
CB	5	Mukhammadkodir Khamraliev
LB	3	Dostonbek Tursunov
DM	23	Abdurauf Buriev
RM	9	Ulugbek Khoshimov		(substituted off) 57'
CM	17	Diyor Kholmatov		(substituted off) 78'
CM	10	Jasurbek Jaloliddinov (c)	(yellow card) 86'	(substituted off) 90+1'
LM	7	Khojimat Erkinov		(substituted off) 77'
CF	19	Khusayin Norchaev
Substitutions:
FW	20	Ruslanbek Jiyanov		(substituted on) 57'
DF	15	Odil Abdumajidov		(substituted on) 57'
MF	14	Abbosbek Fayzullaev		(substituted on) 77'
FW	11	Otabek Jurakuziev		(substituted on) 78'
DF	4	Abubakr Turdialiev		(substituted on) 90+1'
Manager:
Timur Kapadze

GK	1	Nawaf Al-Aqidi
RB	23	Saud Abdulhamid
CB	5	Hassan Al-Tambakti (c)
CB	6	Ibrahim Mahnashi
LB	12	Moteb Al-Harbi
RM	13	Hamad Al-Yami	(yellow card) 67'
CM	8	Hamed Al-Ghamdi	(yellow card) 67'	(substituted off) 77'
LM	7	Ayman Yahya		(substituted off) 81'
AM	11	Ahmed Al-Ghamdi	(yellow card) 72'	(substituted off) 72'
AM	15	Hussain Al-Eisa
CF	9	Firas Al-Buraikan
Substitutions:
MF	10	Turki Al-Ammar		(substituted on) 72'
MF	14	Awad Al-Nashri		(substituted on) 77'
MF	16	Ziyad Al-Johani	(yellow card) 89'	(substituted on) 81'
Manager:
Saad Al-Shehri			(yellow card) 60'

Match rules:

- 90 minutes.
- 30 minutes of extra time if necessary.
- Penalty shoot-out if scores still level.
- Maximum of five substitutions, one substitution added if extra time.

== See also ==
- 2022 AFC U-23 Asian Cup
