= Ibrahim Daldoum =

Jordanian footballer

Personal information
- Full name: Ibrahim Atta Daldoum
- Date of birth: 11 August 1991 (age 35)
- Place of birth: Amman, Jordan
- Position: Left back

Team information
- Current team: Shabab Al-Hussein SC

Senior career*
Years	Team	Apps	(Gls)
2009–2016	Al-Baqa'a		
2016–2022	Al-Faisaly		
2022–2024	Al-Salt		
2024–2025	Ma'an		
2026-	Shabab Al-Hussein SC		

International career^{‡}
2009–2010	Jordan U-19		
2012–2014	Jordan U-22		(1)
2017–2018	Jordan	2	(0)
- * Club domestic league appearances and goals ‡ National team caps and goals as of 1 June 2017

Ibrahim Atta Daldoum (Arabic: إبراهيم عطا دلدوم; born 11 August 1991) is a Jordanian footballer who currently plays for the Jordanian club Shabab Al-Hussein SC.

== International goals ==
=== U-22 ===
#	Date	Venue	Opponent	Score	Result	Competition
	19 May 2013	Cairo	Egypt	4–0	Win	Friendly (Non-International)
1	19 January 2014	Muscat	United Arab Emirates	1–0	Win	2014 AFC U-22 Championship

== Honours ==
Al-Faisaly

- Jordan Premier League (1):2016–17
- Jordan FA Cup (1):2016–17
