= 2026 AFC U-23 Asian Cup =

International football competition

كأس آسيا تحت 23 سنة 2026

Tournament details
- Host country: Saudi Arabia
- Dates: 6–24 January
- Teams: 16 (from 1 confederation)
- Venues: 4 (in 2 host cities)

Final positions
- Champions: Japan (3rd title)
- Runners-up: China
- Third place: Vietnam
- Fourth place: South Korea

Tournament statistics
- Matches played: 32
- Goals scored: 73 (2.28 per match)
- Attendance: 35,655 (1,114 per match)
- Top scorer(s): (Vietnam) Nguyễn Đình Bắc (Note: Nguyễn Đình Bắc won the award since leading in assists with Ryūnosuke Satō among the top goal scorers (2 assists), and playing fewer minutes (361 vs 446 minutes).) (Japan) Ryūnosuke Satō (Jordan) Ali Azaizeh (Lebanon) Leonardo Farah Shahin (4 goals each)
- Best player: (Japan) Ryūnosuke Satō
- Best goalkeeper: (Japan) Rui Araki
- Fair play award: South Korea

The 2026 AFC U-23 Asian Cup was the 7th edition of the AFC U-23 Asian Cup, the biennial international youth football championship organised by the Asian Football Confederation (AFC) for the men's under-23 national teams of Asia. A total of 16 teams played in the final tournament. Players born on or after 1 January 2003 were eligible to participate.

The tournament took place from 6 to 24 January 2026 and was hosted by Saudi Arabia, who was selected for hosting the upcoming 2027 AFC Asian Cup.

16 teams competed in the tournament. Qualification took place in September 2025. Kyrgyzstan and Lebanon qualified for the first time.

This was the final non-Olympic edition of the AFC U-23 Asian Cup with the competition becoming quadrennial.

Defending champions Japan successfully retained the title after defeating the surprise of the tournament, China, in the final, and became the first team to win consecutive titles in the tournament history.

== Host selection ==
In July 2023, the AFC Competitions Committee announced that each non-Olympic edition of the tournament would be hosted by the same association hosting the following AFC Asian Cup. Therefore, Saudi Arabia will be hosting the 2026 edition.

== Qualification ==
Team qualified Team failed to qualify Team withdrew or suspended Not an AFC member

Qualification matches were played between 3 and 9 September 2025.

=== Qualified teams ===
The following teams qualified for the 2026 AFC U-23 Asian Cup.

Team	Qualification method	Date of qualification	Appearance(s)			Previous best performance
Team	Qualification method	Date of qualification	Total	First	Last	Previous best performance
Saudi Arabia	Hosts	1 July 2023	7th	2013	2024	Champions (2022)
Jordan	Group A winners	9 September 2025	7th	2013	2024	Third place (2013)
Japan	Group B winners	9 September 2025	7th	2013	2024	Champions (2016, 2024)
Vietnam	Group C winners	9 September 2025	6th	2016	2024	Runners-up (2018)
Australia	Group D winners	9 September 2025	7th	2013	2024	Third place (2020)
Kyrgyzstan	Group E winners	9 September 2025	1st	None		Debut
Thailand	Group F winners	9 September 2025	6th	2016	2024	Quarter-finals (2020)
Iraq	Group G winners	9 September 2025	7th	2013	2024	Champions (2013)
Qatar	Group H winners	9 September 2025	6th	2016	2024	Third place (2018)
Iran	Group I winners	9 September 2025	5th	2013	2022	Quarter-finals (2016)
South Korea	Group J winners	9 September 2025	7th	2013	2024	Champions (2020)
Syria	Group K winners	9 September 2025	5th	2013	2020	Quarter-finals (2013, 2020)
China	Best runners-up	9 September 2025	6th	2013	2024	Group stage (2013, 2016, 2018, 2020, 2024)
Uzbekistan	Second-best runners-up	9 September 2025	7th	2013	2024	Champions (2018)
Lebanon	Third-best runners-up	9 September 2025	1st	None		Debut
United Arab Emirates	Fourth-best runners-up	9 September 2025	6th	2013	2024	Quarter-finals (2013, 2016, 2020)

== Venues ==
Four stadiums will be used, of which two (Prince Abdullah Al-Faisal Sports City and Al-Shabab Club Stadium) from the 2027 AFC Asian Cup were selected for the tournament.

Jeddah		Location of the host cities of the 2026 AFC U-23 Asian Cup.
Prince Abdullah Al-Faisal Sports City Stadium	King Abdullah Sports City Hall Stadium	Location of the host cities of the 2026 AFC U-23 Asian Cup.
Capacity: 24,159	Capacity: 3,853	Location of the host cities of the 2026 AFC U-23 Asian Cup.
Riyadh		Location of the host cities of the 2026 AFC U-23 Asian Cup.
Prince Faisal bin Fahd Sports City Stadium	Al-Shabab Club Stadium	Location of the host cities of the 2026 AFC U-23 Asian Cup.
Capacity: 22,838	Capacity: 14,000	Location of the host cities of the 2026 AFC U-23 Asian Cup.

== Draw ==
External videos
- 2026 AFC U-23 Asian Cup – Draw
- Draw Live Streaming

The draw took place in Kuala Lumpur, Malaysia on 2 October 2025 at 15:00 MST (UTC+8).

The 16 teams were placed into four groups of four teams, with seeding based on their performance in the previous three editions of the tournament (2020, 2022, and 2024). As hosts, Saudi Arabia were ranked as the top seeded team.

Pot 1	Pot 2	Pot 3	Pot 4
1. Saudi Arabia (hosts); 2. Uzbekistan; 3. Japan; 4. Iraq	5. South Korea; 6. Vietnam; 7. Australia; 8. Qatar	9. Thailand; 10. Jordan; 11. United Arab Emirates; 12. Iran	13. China; 14. Syria; 15. Kyrgyzstan; 16. Lebanon

== Match officials ==
The following referees and assistant referees were appointed for the tournament. Video assistant referees were used in this tournament.

Referees

- (Australia) Alex King
- (Bahrain) Ammar Mahfoodh
- (China) Fu Ming
- (Indonesia) Thoriq Alkatiri
- (Iran) Payam Heydari
- (Iraq) Zaid Thamer Mohammed
- (Japan) Ryo Tanimoto
- (Kuwait) Abdullah Jamali
- (Malaysia) Tuan Yaasin
- (Oman) Qasim Al-Hatmi
- (Qatar) Abdulla Al-Marri
- (Saudi Arabia) Faisal Al-Balawi
- (South Korea) Choi Hyun-jai
- (South Korea) Kim Yu-jeong
- (United Arab Emirates) Yahya Al-Mulla
- (Uzbekistan) Asker Nadjafaliev

Assistant referees

- (Australia) James Lindsay
- (Australia) Kearney Robinson
- (Bahrain) Mohamed Salman
- (China) Cao Yi
- (Indonesia) Bangbang Syamsudar
- (Iran) Ali Ahmadi
- (Iran) Farhad Farhadpoor
- (Iraq) Ameer Al-Windawi
- (Iraq) Hayder Ubaydee
- (Japan) Takeshi Asada
- (Japan) Yosuke Takebe
- (Kuwait) Ali Jraq
- (Malaysia) Shafiq Ahmad Said
- (Oman) Nasser Ambusaidi
- (Qatar) Juma Al-Burshaid
- (Qatar) Khaled Khalaf
- (Saudi Arabia) Ibrahim Al-Dakhil
- (Saudi Arabia) Faisal Al-Qahtani
- (South Korea) Cheon Jin-hee
- (South Korea) Jang Jong-pil
- (South Korea) Park Mi-suk
- (United Arab Emirates) Saeed Al-Marzooqi
- (Uzbekistan) Ruslan Serazitdinov
- (Uzbekistan) Bakhtiyorkhuja Shavkatov

Video assistant referees

- (Australia) Kate Jacewicz
- (China) Jin Jingyuan
- (Hong Kong) Luk Kin Sun
- (Japan) Jumpei Iida
- (Kuwait) Abdullah Arab
- (Qatar) Khamis Al-Marri
- (Saudi Arabia) Abdullah Al-Shehri
- (Singapore) Muhammad Taqi
- (South Korea) Kim Woo-sung
- (Thailand) Sivakorn Pu-udom
- (United Arab Emirates) Mohammed Obaid Khadim
- (Uzbekistan) Firdavs Norsafarov

== Squads ==
Players born on or after 1 January 2003 are eligible to compete in the tournament. Each team will register a squad of 18 to 23 players, including a minimum of three goalkeepers (Regulations Article 26.3).

== Group stage ==
The group winners and runners-up advanced to the knockout stage, which will begin with the quarter-finals.

Tiebreakers

Teams were ranked according to points (3 points for a win, 1 point for a draw, 0 points for a loss), and if tied on points, the following tiebreaking criteria were applied, in the order given, to determine the rankings (Regulations Article 7.2):

1. Points in head-to-head matches among tied teams;
2. Goal difference in head-to-head matches among tied teams;
3. Goals scored in head-to-head matches among tied teams;
4. If more than two teams were tied, and after applying all head-to-head criteria above, a subset of teams were still tied, all head-to-head criteria above were reapplied exclusively to this subset of teams;
5. Goal difference in all group matches;
6. Goals scored in all group matches;
7. Penalty shoot-out if only two teams were tied and they met in the last round of the group;
8. Disciplinary points (yellow card = 1 point, red card as a result of two yellow cards = 3 points, direct red card = 3 points, yellow card followed by direct red card = 4 points);
9. Drawing of lots.

All times are local, SAST (UTC+3).

=== Group A ===
Pos	Team	Pld	W	D	L	GF	GA	GD	Pts	Qualification
1	Vietnam	3	3	0	0	5	1	+4	9	Advance to knockout stage
2	Jordan	3	2	0	1	4	4	0	6	Advance to knockout stage
3	Saudi Arabia (H)	3	1	0	2	3	4	−1	3	
4	Kyrgyzstan	3	0	0	3	1	4	−3	0	

Source: AFC
(H) Hosts
6 January 2026
14:30

Vietnam	2–0	Jordan
Nguyễn Đình Bắc 15' (pen.); Nguyễn Hiểu Minh 42'	Report

King Abdullah Sports City Hall Stadium, Jeddah
Attendance: 219
Referee: Choi Hyun-jai (South Korea)
6 January 2026
19:00

Saudi Arabia	1–0	Kyrgyzstan
Al-Ghamdi 88'	Report

Prince Abdullah Al-Faisal Sports City Stadium, Jeddah
Attendance: 5,082
Referee: Fu Ming (China)

9 January 2026
17:00

Kyrgyzstan	1–2	Vietnam
Murzakhmatov 44'	Report	Khuất Văn Khang 19' (pen.); Brauzman 87' (o.g.)

King Abdullah Sports City Hall Stadium, Jeddah
Attendance: 346
Referee: Payam Heydari (Iran)
9 January 2026
19:30

Jordan	3–2	Saudi Arabia
Azaizeh 38', 45+1'; Deeb 73'	Report	Al-Ghamdi 19'; Al-Juwayr 60' (pen.)

Prince Abdullah Al-Faisal Sports City Stadium, Jeddah
Attendance: 5,593
Referee: Ryo Tanimoto (Japan)

12 January 2026
19:30

Saudi Arabia	0–1	Vietnam
	Report	Nguyễn Đình Bắc 64'

Prince Abdullah Al-Faisal Sports City Stadium, Jeddah
Attendance: 4,919
Referee: Alex King (Australia)
12 January 2026
19:30

Jordan	1–0	Kyrgyzstan
Azaizeh 33'	Report

King Abdullah Sports City Hall Stadium, Jeddah
Attendance: 728
Referee: Ammar Mahfoodh (Bahrain)

=== Group B ===
Pos	Team	Pld	W	D	L	GF	GA	GD	Pts	Qualification
1	Japan	3	3	0	0	10	0	+10	9	Advance to knockout stage
2	United Arab Emirates	3	1	1	1	3	4	−1	4	Advance to knockout stage
3	Syria	3	1	1	1	2	6	−4	4	
4	Qatar	3	0	0	3	0	5	−5	0	

Source: AFC
7 January 2026
14:30

Japan	5–0	Syria
Ozeki 10'; Satō 66', 75'; Ishibashi 87'; Michiwaki 90+3' (pen.)	Report

King Abdullah Sports City Hall Stadium, Jeddah
Attendance: 522
Referee: Zaid Thamer Mohammed (Iraq)
7 January 2026
19:30

Qatar	0–2	United Arab Emirates
	Report	Al-Memari 21'; Ndiaye 37'

Prince Abdullah Al-Faisal Sports City Stadium, Jeddah
Attendance: 203
Referee: Alex King (Australia)

10 January 2026
14:30

United Arab Emirates	0–3	Japan
	Report	Nwadike 5' (pen.); Ozeki 37'; Furuya 82'

King Abdullah Sports City Hall Stadium, Jeddah
Attendance: 114
Referee: Qasim Al-Hatmi (Oman)
10 January 2026
19:30

Syria	1–0	Qatar
Al Aswad 85' (pen.)	Report

Prince Abdullah Al-Faisal Sports City Stadium, Jeddah
Attendance: 898
Referee: Faisal Al-Balawi (Saudi Arabia)

13 January 2026
19:30

Japan	2–0	Qatar
Furuya 30'; Satō 80'	Report

King Abdullah Sports City Hall Stadium, Jeddah
Attendance: 190
Referee: Choi Hyun-jai (South Korea)
13 January 2026
19:30

United Arab Emirates	1–1	Syria
Al-Memari 23'	Report	Al Omar 55'

Prince Abdullah Al-Faisal Sports City Stadium, Jeddah
Attendance: 1,538
Referee: Asker Nadjafaliev (Uzbekistan)

=== Group C ===
Pos	Team	Pld	W	D	L	GF	GA	GD	Pts	Qualification
1	Uzbekistan	3	2	1	0	5	2	+3	7	Advance to knockout stage
2	South Korea	3	1	1	1	4	4	0	4	Advance to knockout stage
3	Lebanon	3	1	0	2	5	7	−2	3	
4	Iran	3	0	2	1	0	1	−1	2	

Source: AFC
7 January 2026
14:30

South Korea	0–0	Iran
	Report

Al-Shabab Club Stadium, Riyadh
Attendance: 127
Referee: Ammar Mahfoodh (Bahrain)
7 January 2026
17:00

Uzbekistan	3–2	Lebanon
Saidov 24'; Khayrullaev 50'; Bakhromov 57'	Report	Shahin 65', 90+5'

Prince Faisal bin Fahd Sports City Stadium, Riyadh
Attendance: 226
Referee: Tuan Yaasin (Malaysia)

10 January 2026
14:30

Lebanon	2–4	South Korea
Shahin 13'; El Fadl 48'	Report	Lee Hyun-yong 20'; Jeong Jae-sang 56'; Kang Seong-jin 71'; Kim Tae-won 76'

Al-Shabab Club Stadium, Riyadh
Attendance: 588
Referee: Abdulla Al-Marri (Qatar)
10 January 2026
17:00

Iran	0–0	Uzbekistan
	Report

Prince Faisal bin Fahd Sports City Stadium, Riyadh
Attendance: 140
Referee: Abdullah Jamali (Kuwait)

13 January 2026
14:30

Uzbekistan	2–0	South Korea
Karimov 48'; Saidnurullaev 70'	Report

Prince Faisal bin Fahd Sports City Stadium, Riyadh
Attendance: 139
Referee: Qasim Al-Hatmi (Oman)
13 January 2026
14:30

Iran	0–1	Lebanon
	Report	Shahin 56' (pen.)

Al-Shabab Club Stadium, Riyadh
Attendance: 122
Referee: Faisal Al-Balawi (Saudi Arabia)

=== Group D ===
Pos	Team	Pld	W	D	L	GF	GA	GD	Pts	Qualification
1	Australia	3	2	0	1	4	3	+1	6	Advance to knockout stage
2	China	3	1	2	0	1	0	+1	5	Advance to knockout stage
3	Iraq	3	0	2	1	2	3	−1	2 (Note: Disciplinary points: Iraq –3, Thailand –11.)	
4	Thailand	3	0	2	1	2	3	−1	2	

Source: AFC
Notes:
8 January 2026
14:30

Australia	2–1	Thailand
Alagich 29' (pen.); Macallister 30'	Report	Sittha 8'

Al-Shabab Club Stadium, Riyadh
Attendance: 90
Referee: Kim Yu-jeong (South Korea)
8 January 2026
17:00

Iraq	0–0	China
	Report

Prince Faisal bin Fahd Sports City Stadium, Riyadh
Attendance: 960
Referee: Asker Nadjafaliev (Uzbekistan)

11 January 2026
14:30

China	1–0	Australia
Peng Xiao 43'	Report

Al-Shabab Club Stadium, Riyadh
Attendance: 475
Referee: Thoriq Alkatiri (Indonesia)
11 January 2026
17:00

Thailand	1–1	Iraq
Chinngoen 85'	Report	Faisal 27' (pen.)

Prince Faisal bin Fahd Sports City Stadium, Riyadh
Attendance: 144
Referee: Yahya Al-Mulla (United Arab Emirates)

14 January 2026
14:30

Iraq	1–2	Australia
Faisal 63' (pen.)	Report	Dukuly 90+3'; Macallister 90+7'

Prince Faisal bin Fahd Sports City Stadium, Riyadh
Attendance: 183
Referee: Abdullah Jamali (Kuwait)
14 January 2026
14:30

Thailand	0–0	China
	Report

Al-Shabab Club Stadium, Riyadh
Attendance: 484
Referee: Abdulla Al-Marri (Qatar)

== Knockout stage ==
In the knockout stage, extra time and penalty shoot-outs will be used to decide the winner if necessary.

=== Bracket ===
Quarter-finals
16 January – Jeddah (Prince)
Vietnam (a.e.t.)	3
United Arab Emirates	2
17 January – Jeddah (Prince)
Uzbekistan	0 (2)
China (p)	0 (4)
16 January – Jeddah (King)
Japan (p)	1 (4)
Jordan	1 (2)
17 January – Jeddah (King)
Australia	1
South Korea	2

Semi-finals
20 January – Jeddah (Prince)
Vietnam	0
China	3
20 January – Jeddah (King)
Japan	1
South Korea	0

Final
24 January – Jeddah (Prince)
China	0
Japan	4
Third place play-off
23 January – Jeddah (King)
Vietnam (p)	2 (7)
South Korea	2 (6)

=== Quarter-finals ===
16 January 2026
14:30

Japan	1–1 (a.e.t.)	Jordan
Al-Khob 50' (o.g.)	Report	Azaizeh 30'
Penalties
Ichihara (penalty scored); Michiwaki (penalty scored); Satō (penalty scored); Kawai (penalty scored)	4–2	(penalty missed) Taha; (penalty scored) Fraij; (penalty scored) Al-Fakhouri; (penalty missed) Al-Shatti

King Abdullah Sports City Hall Stadium, Jeddah
Attendance: 877
Referee: Asker Nadjafaliev (Uzbekistan)

16 January 2026
18:30

Vietnam	3–2 (a.e.t.)	United Arab Emirates
Nguyễn Lê Phát 39'; Nguyễn Đình Bắc 62'; Phạm Minh Phúc 101'	Report	Ndiaye 42'; Al-Menhali 68'

Prince Abdullah Al-Faisal Sports City Stadium, Jeddah
Attendance: 211
Referee: Payam Heydari (Iran)

17 January 2026
14:30

Uzbekistan	0–0 (a.e.t.)	China
	Report
Penalties
Bakhromov (penalty scored); Saidnurullaev (penalty scored); Karimov (penalty missed); Abdullaev (penalty missed)	2–4	(penalty scored) Liu Haofan; (penalty scored) Peng Xiao; (penalty scored) Xiang Yuwang; (penalty missed) Yang Haoyu; (penalty scored) Wang Bohao

Prince Abdullah Al-Faisal Sports City Stadium, Jeddah
Attendance: 578
Referee: Ammar Mahfoodh (Bahrain)

17 January 2026
18:30

Australia	1–2	South Korea
Jovanovic 51'	Report	Baek Ga-on 21'; Shin Min-ha 88'

King Abdullah Sports City Hall Stadium, Jeddah
Attendance: 172
Referee: Fu Ming (China)

=== Semi-finals ===
20 January 2026
14:30

Japan	1–0	South Korea
Koizumi 36'	Report

King Abdullah Sports City Hall Stadium, Jeddah
Attendance: 188
Referee: Abdulla Al-Marri (Qatar)

20 January 2026
18:30

Vietnam	0–3	China
	Report	Peng Xiao 47'; Xiang Yuwang 52'; Wang Yudong 90+8'

Prince Abdullah Al-Faisal Sports City Stadium, Jeddah
Attendance: 1,141
Referee: Alex King (Australia)

=== Third place play-off ===
23 January 2026
18:00

Vietnam	2–2 (a.e.t.)	South Korea
Nguyễn Quốc Việt 30'; Nguyễn Đình Bắc 71'	Report	Kim Tae-won 69'; Shin Min-ha 90+7'
Penalties
Khuất Văn Khang (penalty scored); Phạm Minh Phúc (penalty scored); Nguyễn Thái Quốc Cường (penalty scored); Nguyễn Ngọc Mỹ (penalty scored); Nguyễn Nhật Minh (penalty scored); Nguyễn Xuân Bắc (penalty scored); Nguyễn Thanh Nhàn (penalty scored)	7–6	(penalty scored) Kim Tae-won; (penalty scored) Kang Seong-jin; (penalty scored) Lee Chan-ouk; (penalty scored) Kim Yong-hak; (penalty scored) Lee Hyun-yong; (penalty scored) Jang Seok-hwan; (penalty missed) Bae Hyun-seo

King Abdullah Sports City Hall Stadium, Jeddah
Attendance: 270
Referee: Abdullah Jamali (Kuwait)

=== Final ===
24 January 2026
18:00

China	0–4	Japan
	Report	Ozeki 12'; Ogura 20', 76'; Satō 59' (pen.)

Prince Abdullah Al-Faisal Sports City Stadium, Jeddah
Attendance: 8,188
Referee: Faisal Al-Balawi (Saudi Arabia)

== Winners ==
2026 AFC U-23 Asian Cup
(Japan)
Japan
3rd title

== Awards ==
The following awards were given at the conclusion of the tournament:

Top scorer	Best player	Best goalkeeper	Fair-play award
(Vietnam) Nguyễn Đình Bắc	(Japan) Ryūnosuke Satō	(Japan) Rui Araki	South Korea

== Statistics ==
=== Goalscorers ===
There were 73 goals scored in 32 matches, for an average of 2.28 goals per match.

4 goals

- (Japan) Ryūnosuke Satō
- (Jordan) Ali Azaizeh
- (Lebanon) Leonardo Farah Shahin
- (Vietnam) Nguyễn Đình Bắc

3 goals

- (Japan) Yuto Ozeki

2 goals

- (Australia) Mathias Macallister
- (China) Peng Xiao
- (Iraq) Amoori Faisal
- (Japan) Shusuke Furuya
- (Japan) Kosei Ogura
- (Saudi Arabia) Rakan Al-Ghamdi
- (South Korea) Kim Tae-won
- (South Korea) Shin Min-ha
- (United Arab Emirates) Ali Al-Memari
- (United Arab Emirates) Junior Ndiaye

1 goal

- (Australia) Ethan Alagich
- (Australia) Yaya Dukuly
- (Australia) Luka Jovanovic
- (China) Wang Yudong
- (China) Xiang Yuwang
- (Japan) Sena Ishibashi
- (Japan) Kaito Koizumi
- (Japan) Yutaka Michiwaki
- (Japan) Uche Brian Seo Nwadike
- (Jordan) Mahmoud Deeb
- (Kyrgyzstan) Marlen Murzakhmatov
- (Lebanon) Ali El Fadl
- (Saudi Arabia) Musab Al-Juwayr
- (South Korea) Baek Ga-on
- (South Korea) Jeong Jae-sang
- (South Korea) Kang Seong-jin
- (South Korea) Lee Hyun-yong
- (Syria) Mahmoud Al Aswad
- (Syria) Mahmoud Al Omar
- (Thailand) Sittha Boonlha
- (Thailand) Chinngoen Phutonyong
- (United Arab Emirates) Mansoor Al-Menhali
- (Uzbekistan) Sardorbek Bakhromov
- (Uzbekistan) Bekhruz Karimov
- (Uzbekistan) Ravshan Khayrullaev
- (Uzbekistan) Saidumarkhon Saidnurullaev
- (Uzbekistan) Amirbek Saidov
- (Vietnam) Khuất Văn Khang
- (Vietnam) Nguyễn Hiểu Minh
- (Vietnam) Nguyễn Lê Phát
- (Vietnam) Nguyễn Quốc Việt
- (Vietnam) Phạm Minh Phúc

1 own goal

- (Jordan) Anas Al-Khob (against Japan)
- (Kyrgyzstan) Khristiyan Brauzman (against Vietnam)

Source: AFC

=== Final ranking ===
Ranking criteria
For teams eliminated in the quarter-finals, the following criteria are applied, in the order given, to determine the final rankings:
1. Points in all matches;
2. Goal difference in the quarter-finals;
3. Goals scored in the quarter-finals;
4. Points in group stage;
5. Goal difference in group stage;
6. Goals scored in group stage;
7. Disciplinary points;
8. Drawing of lots.

For teams eliminated in the group stage, the following criteria are applied, in the order given, to determine the final rankings:

1. Position in group;
2. Points;
3. Goal difference;
4. Goals scored;
5. Disciplinary points;
6. Drawing of lots.

Pos	Grp	Team	Pld	W	D	L	GF	GA	GD	Pts	Final result
1	B	Japan	6	5	1	0	16	1	+15	16	Champions
2	D	China	6	2	3	1	4	4	0	9	Runners-up
3	A	Vietnam	6	4	1	1	10	8	+2	13	Third place
4	C	South Korea	6	2	2	2	8	8	0	8	Fourth place
5	C	Uzbekistan	4	2	2	0	5	2	+3	8	Eliminated in quarter-finals
6	A	Jordan	4	2	1	1	5	5	0	7	Eliminated in quarter-finals
7	D	Australia	4	2	0	2	5	5	0	6	Eliminated in quarter-finals
8	B	United Arab Emirates	4	1	1	2	5	7	−2	4	Eliminated in quarter-finals
9	B	Syria	3	1	1	1	2	6	−4	4	Eliminated in group stage
10	A	Saudi Arabia (H)	3	1	0	2	3	4	−1	3	Eliminated in group stage
11	C	Lebanon	3	1	0	2	5	7	−2	3	Eliminated in group stage
12	D	Iraq	3	0	2	1	2	3	−1	2 (Note: Disciplinary points: Iraq –3, Thailand –11.)	Eliminated in group stage
13	D	Thailand	3	0	2	1	2	3	−1	2	Eliminated in group stage
14	C	Iran	3	0	2	1	0	1	−1	2	Eliminated in group stage
15	A	Kyrgyzstan	3	0	0	3	1	4	−3	0	Eliminated in group stage
16	B	Qatar	3	0	0	3	0	5	−5	0	Eliminated in group stage

Source: AFC
(H) Hosts

== Broadcasting rights ==
Territory	Rights holder	Ref.
Australia	Paramount+	
Bangladesh, Nepal, Sri Lanka, Bhutan, Pakistan	tapmad	
China	CMG; iQIYI; Migu Video	
Hong Kong	HOY TV	
India	FanCode	
Indonesia, Papua New Guinea, Timor-Leste	MNC Media	
Japan	DAZN	
Kazakhstan	QSport	
South Korea	Coupang Play	
Macau	Mplus; TDM	
Middle East (Note: Bahrain, Iran, Iraq, Jordan, Kuwait, Lebanon, Oman, Palestine, Qatar, Saudi Arabia, Syria, United Arab Emirates, Yemen)	beIN Sports; Alkass	
Philippines	PFF (Facebook)	
Tajikistan	Varzish TV	
Thailand	BG Sports (YouTube)	
Uzbekistan	Sport	
Vietnam	TV360; VTV; HTV	

== See also ==
- 2026 AFC U-17 Asian Cup
