= AFC U-23 Asian Cup =

Association football tournament in Asia

- Organiser(s): AFC
- Founded: 2012 (as AFC U-22 Championship)
- Region: Asia
- Teams: 16
- Current champions: Japan (3rd title)
- Most championships: Japan (3 titles)
- 2028 AFC U-23 Asian Cup

The AFC U-23 Asian Cup, previously the AFC U-22 Championship and AFC U-23 Championship, is a biennial international football competition organised by the Asian Football Confederation (AFC) for the men's under-23 national teams of Asia. Each edition of the tournament that is in a year divisible by four is linked to the qualification process for the Olympic Games, whereby the top two teams in the tournament qualify directly.

The first edition was initially set to be held in 2013 and its qualification matches in 2014, but the finals tournament was postponed to be played in January 2014 due to the 2013 EAFF East Asian Cup. In 2016 the tournament was also renamed from the "AFC U-22 Championship" to the "AFC U-23 Championship". The tournament was rebranded as the "AFC U-23 Asian Cup" in 2021.

In July 2023, the AFC announced that each non-Olympic edition of the tournament would be hosted by the same association hosting the next AFC Asian Cup. However, on 24 May 2024, AFC announced that the tournament will be held quadrennially from 2028, with the last non-Olympic qualifiers’ edition held in 2026.

== Format ==
The overview of the competition format in the 2016 tournament was as follows:

- 16 teams competed in the final tournament, including the hosts which were automatically qualified.
- Teams were seeded by the result of 2013 AFC U-22 Championship.
- The tournament was held in 18 days.
- 3 or 4 stadiums in at most 2 cities were needed to host the tournament.

In addition, players would be ineligible for participating in the AFC U-17 Asian Cup if they participated in a higher age group competition (this tournament or the AFC U-20 Asian Cup), though in reality it is rarely enforced.

== Results ==
Tournament names

- 2013: AFC U-22 Championship
- 2016–2020: AFC U-23 Championship
- 2022–present: AFC U-23 Asian Cup

Ed.	Year	Hosts	Final			Third place match		
Ed.	Year	Hosts	Champions	Score	Runners-up	Third place	Score	Fourth place
1	2013	Oman	Iraq	1–0	Saudi Arabia	Jordan	0–0 (a.e.t.) (3–2 p)	South Korea
2	2016	Qatar	Japan	3–2	South Korea	Iraq	2–1 (a.e.t.)	Qatar
3	2018	China	Uzbekistan	2–1 (a.e.t.)	Vietnam	Qatar	1–0	South Korea
4	2020	Thailand	South Korea	1–0 (a.e.t.)	Saudi Arabia	Australia	1–0	Uzbekistan
5	2022	Uzbekistan	Saudi Arabia	2–0	Uzbekistan	Japan	3–0	Australia
6	2024	Qatar	Japan	1–0	Uzbekistan	Iraq	2–1 (a.e.t.)	Indonesia
7	2026	Saudi Arabia	Japan	4–0	China	Vietnam	2–2 (a.e.t.) (7–6 p)	South Korea
8	2028	Japan						

== Teams reaching the top four ==
Team	Title(s)	Runners-up	Third place	Fourth place	Total
Japan	3 (2016, 2024, 2026)	–	1 (2022)	–	4
Uzbekistan	1 (2018)	2 (**2022**, 2024)	–	1 (2020)	4
Saudi Arabia	1 (2022)	2 (2013, 2020)	–	–	3
South Korea	1 (2020)	1 (2016)	–	3 (2013, 2018, 2026)	5
Iraq	1 (2013)	–	2 (2016, 2024)	–	3
Vietnam	–	1 (2018)	1 (2026)	–	2
China	–	1 (2026)	–	–	1
Qatar	–	–	1 (2018)	1 (**2016**)	2
Australia	–	–	1 (2020)	1 (2022)	2
Jordan	–	–	1 (2013)	–	1
Indonesia	–	–	–	1 (2024)	1

- Results from host teams shown in bold

== Overall team records ==
In this ranking 3 points are awarded for a win, 1 for a draw, and 0 for a loss. As per statistical convention in football, matches decided in extra time are counted as wins and losses, while matches decided by penalty shoot-outs are counted as draws. Teams are ranked by total points, then by goal difference, then by goals scored.

As of 2026 AFC U-23 Asian Cup

Rank	Team	Part	M	W	D	L	GF	GA	GD	Point(s)
1	Japan	7	35	24	5	6	68	26	+42	77
2	South Korea	7	38	23	8	7	60	36	+24	77
3	Uzbekistan	7	34	19	5	10	61	27	+34	62
4	Iraq	7	32	17	11	4	51	33	+18	62
5	Saudi Arabia	7	31	16	6	9	47	28	+19	54
6	Australia	7	29	12	6	11	26	29	−3	42
7	Qatar	6	25	11	7	7	35	37	–2	40
8	Jordan	7	27	8	11	8	29	28	+1	35
9	Vietnam	6	26	8	8	10	32	37	−5	32
10	United Arab Emirates	6	22	6	6	10	20	29	−9	24
11	Syria	5	17	5	5	7	16	24	−8	20
12	Iran	5	16	4	6	6	18	20	−2	18
13	Thailand	6	19	3	6	10	20	30	−10	15
14	China	6	21	4	3	14	16	29	−13	15
15	North Korea	4	13	3	4	6	15	19	−4	13
16	Indonesia	1	6	2	1	3	8	9	−1	7
17	Palestine	1	4	1	1	2	8	6	+2	4
18	Turkmenistan	1	4	1	1	2	4	5	−1	4
19	Kuwait	3	9	1	1	7	5	19	−14	4
20	Malaysia	3	10	1	1	8	6	22	−16	4
21	Lebanon	1	3	1	0	2	5	7	−2	3
22	Oman	2	6	1	0	5	4	8	−4	3
23	Tajikistan	2	6	1	0	5	5	18	−13	3
24	Bahrain	1	3	0	2	1	3	8	−5	2
25	Kyrgyzstan	1	3	0	0	3	1	4	−3	0
26	Myanmar	1	3	0	0	3	1	13	−12	0
27	Yemen	2	6	0	0	6	2	15	−13	0

== Champions by regions ==
Regional federation	Champion(s)	Title(s)
EAFF (East Asia)	Japan (3); South Korea (1)	4
WAFF (West Asia)	Iraq (1); Saudi Arabia (1)	2
CAFA (Central Asia)	Uzbekistan (1)	1
AFF (Southeast Asia)	–	0
SAFF (South Asia)	–	0

== Comprehensive team results by tournament ==
Legend

- 1st – Champions
- 2nd – Runners-up
- 3rd – Third place
- 4th – Fourth place
- QF – Quarter-finals
- GS – Group stage
- Q – Qualified
- — Hosts
- • – Did not qualify
- × – Did not enter
- × – Withdrew before qualification / Banned

Teams	2013	2016	2018	2020	2022	2024	2026	(Japan) 2028	Total
Australia	QF	GS	GS	**3rd**	**4th**	GS	QF		7
Bahrain	•	•	•	GS	•	•	•		1
China	GS	GS	GS	GS	×	GS	**2nd**		6
Indonesia	•	•	•	•	•	**4th**	•		1
Iran	GS	QF	•	GS	GS	•	GS		5
Iraq	**1st**	**3rd**	QF	GS	QF	**3rd**	GS		7
Japan	QF	**1st**	QF	GS	**3rd**	**1st**	**1st**	Q	8
Jordan	**3rd**	QF	GS	QF	GS	GS	QF		7
Kuwait	GS	•	×	•	GS	GS	•		3
Kyrgyzstan	•	•	•	•	•	•	GS		1
Lebanon	•	•	•	•	•	•	GS		1
Malaysia	•	•	QF	•	GS	GS	•		3
Myanmar	GS	•	•	•	•	•	•		1
North Korea	GS	QF	GS	GS	×	×	×		4
Oman	GS	•	GS	•	•	•	•		2
Palestine	•	•	QF	•	•	•	•		1
Qatar	•	**4th**	**3rd**	GS	GS	QF	GS		6
Saudi Arabia	**2nd**	GS	GS	**2nd**	**1st**	QF	GS		7
South Korea	**4th**	**2nd**	**4th**	**1st**	QF	QF	**4th**		7
Syria	QF	GS	GS	QF	•	•	GS		5
Tajikistan	•	•	•	•	GS	GS	•		2
Thailand	•	GS	GS	QF	GS	GS	GS		6
Turkmenistan	•	•	•	•	QF	•	•		1
United Arab Emirates	QF	QF	•	QF	GS	GS	QF		6
Uzbekistan	GS	GS	**1st**	**4th**	**2nd**	**2nd**	QF		7
Vietnam	•	GS	**2nd**	GS	QF	QF	**3rd**		6
Yemen	GS	GS	×	•	•	•	•		2
Total	16	16	16	16	16	16	16	16	

== Results at the Olympics (2016–present) ==
Nation	(Brazil) 2016	(Japan) 2020	(France) 2024	(United States) 2028	(Australia) 2032	Years
Australia	–	12	–		Q	2
Iraq	12	–	10			2
Japan	10	4	5			3
Saudi Arabia	–	15	–			1
South Korea	5	5	–			2
Uzbekistan	–	–	13			1

== Awards ==
Tournament	Most Valuable Player	Top goalscorer(s)	Goals	Best goalkeeper	Fair play award
2013	(Iraq) Amjad Kalaf	(Iran) Kaveh Rezaei	5	Not awarded	South Korea
2016	(Japan) Shoya Nakajima	(Qatar) Ahmed Alaaeldin	6	Not awarded	Japan
2018	(Uzbekistan) Odiljon Hamrobekov	(Qatar) Almoez Ali	6	Not awarded	Vietnam
2020	(South Korea) Won Du-jae	(Thailand) Jaroensak Wonggorn	3	(South Korea) Song Bum-keun	Saudi Arabia
2022	(Saudi Arabia) Ayman Yahya	(South Korea) Cho Young-wook	3	(Saudi Arabia) Nawaf Al-Aqidi	Saudi Arabia
2024	(Japan) Joel Chima Fujita	(Iraq) Ali Jasim	4	(Uzbekistan) Abduvohid Nematov	Uzbekistan
2026	(Japan) Ryūnosuke Satō	(Vietnam) Nguyễn Đình Bắc	4	(Japan) Rui Araki	South Korea

== Winning coaches ==
Year	Team	Coach
2013	Iraq	(Iraq) Hakeem Shaker
2016	Japan	(Japan) Makoto Teguramori
2018	Uzbekistan	(Uzbekistan) Ravshan Khaydarov
2020	South Korea	(South Korea) Kim Hak-bum
2022	Saudi Arabia	(Saudi Arabia) Saad Al-Shehri
2024	Japan	(Japan) Gō Ōiwa
2026	Japan	(Japan) Gō Ōiwa

== See also ==
- Football at the Summer Olympics
- AFC U-20 Asian Cup
- AFC U-17 Asian Cup
- AFC Asian Cup
