= United Arab Emirates national under-23 football team =

United Arab Emirates U-23
- Nickname: Al Abyad
- Association: UAEFA
- Confederation: AFC (Asia)
- Sub-confederation: WAFF (West Asia)
- Head coach: Igor Bišćan
- Home stadium: Various
- FIFA code: UAE
| First colours | Second colours |

First international
- United Arab Emirates 1–0 Pakistan (South Korea; 21 September 1986)

Biggest win
- United Arab Emirates 13–0 Guam (Abu Dhabi; 3 September 2025)

Biggest defeat
- United Arab Emirates 0–5 Kuwait (Thailand; 7 December 1998)

The United Arab Emirates national under-23 football team represents United Arab Emirates in association football and is administered by the United Arab Emirates Football Association.

== Recent fixtures ==
=== 2026 ===
| 7 January 2026 AFC U-23 Asian Cup GS | Qatar | 0–2 | United Arab Emirates | Prince Abdullah Al-Faisal Sports City Stadium, Jeddah |
| 19:30 UTC+3 | | Report | Al-Memari 21'; Ndiaye 37' | Attendance: 203; Referee: Alex King (Australia) |

| 10 January 2026 AFC U-23 Asian Cup GS | United Arab Emirates | 0–3 | Japan | Jeddah, Saudi Arabia |
| 14:30 UTC+3 | | Report | Nwadike 5' (pen.); Ozeki 37'; Furuya 82' | Stadium: King Abdullah Sports City Hall Stadium; Attendance: 114; Referee: Qasim Al-Hatmi (Oman) |

| 13 January 2026 AFC U-23 Asian Cup GS | United Arab Emirates | 1–1 | Syria | Prince Abdullah Al-Faisal Sports City Stadium, Jeddah |
| 14:30 UTC+3 | Al-Memari 23' | Report | Al Omar 55' | Attendance: 1,538; Referee: Asker Nadjafaliev (Uzbekistan) |

| 3 June Friendly | South Korea | 1–1 | United Arab Emirates | Thanyaburi, Thailand |
| 20:00 UTC+7 | Lee Seung-won 47' | Report | Saleh 50' | Stadium: True BG Stadium |

| 9 June Friendly | Thailand | 2–5 | United Arab Emirates | Pathum Thani, Thailand |
| | Thanakrit 2'; Jehhanafee 85' |

| 16 September Asian Games | United Arab Emirates | 1–3 | Iran | Kariya |
| 14:00 UTC+9 | Hunt 57' | Report | Shahrabadi 49'; Sosu 53' (o.g.); Mazraeh 88' | Stadium: Wave Stadium Kariya; Attendance: 671; Referee: Sadullo Gulmurodi (Tajikistan) |

| 20 September Asian Games | North Korea | 0–0 | United Arab Emirates | Kariya |
| 19:00 UTC+9 | | Report | | Stadium: Wave Stadium Kariya; Attendance: 1,139; Referee: Adam Kersey (Australia) |

| 23 September Asian Games | China | v | United Arab Emirates | Toyota, Japan |
| 14:30 UTC+9 | | Report | | Stadium: Toyota Stadium |

== Current staff ==
| Position | Name |
|---|---|
| Head coach | (Croatia) Igor Bišćan |
| Assistant coach | (Brazil) Marcelo Maseda |
| Assistant coach | (United Arab Emirates) Sulaiman Haji Alblooshi |
| Goalkeeping coach | (United Arab Emirates) Yousef Almansoori |
| Fitness coach | (Portugal) Tiago Jose Gonçalves (Argentina) Mauricio Leon |
| Scouting | (United Arab Emirates) Matar Aldhaheri |
| Team administrator | (United Arab Emirates) Salim Al Yaqoubi |
| Doctor | (United Arab Emirates) Abdulla Baroon |
| Team Manager | (United Arab Emirates) Esam Al-Ali |
| Performance Analyst | (Spain) Joan Armengol |

== Players ==
=== Current squad ===
The following 23 players were called up for the football tournament at the 2026 Asian Games in Aichi-Nagoya, Japan, under head coach Igor Bišćan.

| No. | Pos. | Player | Date of birth (age) | Club |
|---|---|---|---|---|
| | GK | Khaled Tawhid | 16 February 2004 (aged 22) | (United Arab Emirates Football Association) Sharjah |
| | GK | Saeed Maqdami | 21 August 2004 (aged 22) | (United Arab Emirates Football Association) Al Nasr |
| | GK | Rashed Maqdami | 20 November 2005 (aged 20) | (United Arab Emirates Football Association) United FC |
| | DF | Bader Nasser | 16 September 2001 (aged 25) | (United Arab Emirates Football Association) Al Wahda |
| | DF | Leonard Amesimeku | 25 November 2003 (aged 22) | (United Arab Emirates Football Association) Al Dhafra |
| | DF | Khamis Al-Mansoori | 15 January 2004 (aged 22) | (United Arab Emirates Football Association) Baniyas |
| | DF | Mansoor Al-Blooshi | 19 January 2005 (aged 21) | (United Arab Emirates Football Association) Al Ain |
| | DF | Mubarak Bani Zamah | 29 November 2003 (aged 22) | (United Arab Emirates Football Association) Baniyas |
| | DF | Mansour Saleh Al Menhali | 12 November 2004 (aged 21) | (United Arab Emirates Football Association) Al Wahda |
| | DF | Nahyan Al Mamari | 23 September 2005 (aged 20) | (United Arab Emirates Football Association) Al Ain |
| | DF | Yousif Al Marzooqi | 7 March 2005 (aged 21) | (United Arab Emirates Football Association) Al Dhafra |
| | MF | Mackenzie Hunt | 14 November 2001 (aged 24) | (United Arab Emirates Football Association) Baniyas |
| | MF | Solomon Sosu | 5 March 2005 (aged 21) | (United Arab Emirates Football Association) Baniyas |
| | MF | Ali Al Blooshi | 16 July 2003 (aged 23) | (United Arab Emirates Football Association) Al Nasr |
| | MF | Matar Zaal | 2 March 2004 (aged 22) | (United Arab Emirates Football Association) Sharjah |
| | MF | Hazim Abbas | 18 March 2005 (aged 21) | (United Arab Emirates Football Association) Al Ain |
| | MF | Saif Al Kaabi | 14 February 2005 (aged 21) | (United Arab Emirates Football Association) Sharjah |
| | FW | Yahya Al-Ghassani | 18 April 1998 (aged 28) | (United Arab Emirates Football Association) Shabab Al Ahli |
| | FW | Mansour Saeed Al Menhali | 29 September 2003 (aged 22) | (United Arab Emirates Football Association) Baniyas |
| | FW | Junior Ndiaye | 29 March 2005 (aged 21) | (French Football Federation) Valenciennes |
| | FW | Mohamed Jumah Al Mansoori | 30 May 2006 (aged 20) | (United Arab Emirates Football Association) Shabab Al Ahli |
| | FW | Ahmed Raed Al Shammari | 19 April 2005 (aged 21) | (United Arab Emirates Football Association) Al Nasr |
| | FW | Mayed Al-Kass | 6 May 2003 (aged 23) | (United Arab Emirates Football Association) Sharjah |

=== Overage players in Olympic football ===
| Tournament | Player 1 | Player 2 | Player 3 |
|---|---|---|---|
| 2012 | Ali Khasif (GK) | Ismail Al Hammadi (MF) | Ismail Matar (FW) |
| 2026 | Bader Nasser (DF) | Mackenzie Hunt (MF) | Yahya Al Ghassani (FW) |

== Tournament records ==
=== Olympic Games ===
| Year | Round | Position | Pld | W | D | L | GF | GA |
|---|---|---|---|---|---|---|---|---|
| (Spain) 1992 | did not qualify | | | | | | | |
| (United States) 1996 | did not qualify | | | | | | | |
| (Australia) 2000 | did not qualify | | | | | | | |
| (Greece) 2004 | did not qualify | | | | | | | |
| (China) 2008 | did not qualify | | | | | | | |
| (United Kingdom) 2012 | Group stage | 15th | 3 | 0 | 1 | 2 | 3 | 6 |
| (Brazil) 2016 | did not qualify | | | | | | | |
| (Japan) 2020 | did not qualify | | | | | | | |
| (France) 2024 | did not qualify | | | | | | | |
| (United States) 2028 | TBD | | | | | | | |
| (Australia) 2032 | TBD | | | | | | | |
| Total | Group Stage | 15th | 3 | 0 | 1 | 2 | 3 | 6 |

==== Matches ====
List of Olympic matches
| 2012 | Group Stage | Uruguay | 1–2 | Loss | 0–0–1 |
| 2012 | Group Stage | Great Britain | 1–3 | Loss | 0–0–2 |
| 2012 | Group Stage | Senegal | 1–1 | Draw | 0–1–2 |

=== AFC U-23 Asian Cup ===
| Final | | | | | | | | | Qualification | | | | | |
| Year | Round | Position | Pld | W | D | L | GF | GA | Pld | W | D | L | GF | GA |
|---|---|---|---|---|---|---|---|---|---|---|---|---|---|---|
| (Oman) 2013 | Quarter-finals | 8th | 4 | 1 | 2 | 1 | 2 | 2 | 5 | 3 | 2 | 0 | 8 | 4 |
| (Qatar) 2016 | Quarter-finals | 5th | 4 | 2 | 1 | 1 | 5 | 5 | 3 | 3 | 0 | 0 | 8 | 0 |
| (China) 2018 | did not qualify | | | | | | | | 3 | 2 | 0 | 1 | 6 | 2 |
| (Thailand) 2020 | Quarter-finals | 6th | 4 | 1 | 2 | 1 | 4 | 6 | 3 | 2 | 1 | 0 | 10 | 2 |
| (Uzbekistan) 2022 | Group stage | 11th | 3 | 1 | 0 | 2 | 3 | 4 | 3 | 2 | 0 | 1 | 4 | 2 |
| (Qatar) 2024 | Group stage | 15th | 3 | 0 | 0 | 3 | 1 | 5 | 2 | 1 | 1 | 0 | 3 | 0 |
| (Saudi Arabia) 2026 | Quarter-finals | 8th | 4 | 1 | 1 | 2 | 5 | 7 | 3 | 2 | 0 | 1 | 17 | 3 |
| (Japan) 2028 | To be determined | | | | | | | | To be determined | | | | | |
| Total | Quarter-finals | 5th | 22 | 6 | 6 | 10 | 20 | 29 | 22 | 15 | 4 | 3 | 56 | 13 |

==== Matches ====
List of AFC U-23 Asian Cup matches
| 2013 | Group Stage | Syria | 1–1 | Draw | 0–1–0 |
| 2013 | Group Stage | Yemen | 1–0 | Win | 1–1–0 |
| 2013 | Group Stage | North Korea | 0–0 | Draw | 1–2–0 |
| 2013 | Quarter-final | Jordan | 0–1 | Loss | 1–2–1 |
| 2016 | Group Stage | Australia | 1–0 | Win | 2–2–1 |
| 2016 | Group Stage | Jordan | 0–0 | Draw | 2–3–1 |
| 2016 | Group Stage | Vietnam | 3–2 | Win | 3–3–1 |
| 2016 | Quarter-final | Iraq | 1–3 (a.e.t.) | Loss | 3–3–2 |
| 2020 | Group Stage | Vietnam | 0–0 | Draw | 3–4–2 |
| 2020 | Group Stage | North Korea | 2–0 | Win | 4–4–2 |
| 2020 | Group Stage | Jordan | 1–1 | Draw | 4–5–2 |
| 2020 | Quarter-final | Uzbekistan | 1–5 | Loss | 4–5–3 |
| 2022 | Group Stage | Japan | 1–2 | Loss | 4–5–4 |
| 2022 | Group Stage | Tajikistan | 2–0 | Win | 5–5–4 |
| 2022 | Group Stage | Saudi Arabia | 0–2 | Loss | 5–5–5 |
| 2024 | Group Stage | South Korea | 0–1 | Loss | 5–5–6 |
| 2024 | Group Stage | Japan | 0–2 | Loss | 5–5–7 |
| 2024 | Group Stage | China | 1–2 | Loss | 5–5–8 |
| 2026 | Group Stage | Qatar | 2–0 | Win | 6–5–8 |
| 2026 | Group Stage | Japan | 0–3 | Loss | 6–5–9 |
| 2026 | Group Stage | Syria | 1–1 | Draw | 6–6–9 |
| 2026 | Quarter-final | Vietnam | 2–3 (a.e.t.) | Loss | 6–6–10 |

=== Asian Games ===
| Year | Round | GP | W | D | L | GF | GA |
|---|---|---|---|---|---|---|---|
| (South Korea) 2002 | Group stage | 3 | 1 | 1 | 1 | 3 | 4 |
| (Qatar) 2006 | Group stage | 3 | 0 | 1 | 2 | 3 | 7 |
| (China) 2010 | Silver | 7 | 4 | 2 | 1 | 9 | 2 |
| (South Korea) 2014 | Quarter-finals | 4 | 2 | 0 | 2 | 8 | 3 |
| (Indonesia) 2018 | Bronze | 7 | 1 | 3 | 3 | 9 | 9 |
| (Japan) 2026 | Group stage | 3 | 0 | 2 | 1 | 1 | 3 |
| Total | Runner-ups | 27 | 8 | 9 | 10 | 33 | 28 |

=== GCC Championship ===
| Year | Round | GP | W | D | L | GF | GA |
|---|---|---|---|---|---|---|---|
| (Saudi Arabia) 2008 | did not enter | | | | | | |
| (Qatar) 2010 | Champions | 4 | 3 | 1 | 0 | 6 | 2 |
| (Qatar) 2011 | Runners-up | 4 | 2 | 1 | 1 | 9 | 4 |

=== WAFF Championship ===
| Year | Round | GP | W | D | L | GF | GA |
|---|---|---|---|---|---|---|---|
| (Qatar) 2015 | Group stage | 2 | 1 | 0 | 1 | 5 | 5 |
| (Saudi Arabia) 2021 | Group stage | 3 | 1 | 0 | 2 | 3 | 3 |
| (Saudi Arabia) 2022 | Did not participate | | | | | | |
| (Iraq) 2023 | Group stage | 2 | 0 | 0 | 2 | 1 | 5 |
| (Saudi Arabia) 2024 | Group stage | 3 | 0 | 1 | 2 | 1 | 3 |
| Total | Group stage | 10 | 2 | 1 | 7 | 10 | 16 |

== Head-to-head record ==
The following table shows United Arab Emirates' head-to-head record in the Football at the Summer Olympics and AFC U-23 Asian Cup.

=== In Football at the Summer Olympics ===
| Opponent | Pld | W | D | L | GF | GA | GD | Win % |
|---|---|---|---|---|---|---|---|---|
| Great Britain | 1 | 0 | 0 | 1 | 1 | 3 | −2 | 0.00 |
| Senegal | 1 | 0 | 1 | 0 | 1 | 1 | +0 | 0.00 |
| Uruguay | 1 | 0 | 0 | 1 | 1 | 2 | −1 | 0.00 |
| Total | 3 | 0 | 1 | 2 | 3 | 6 | −3 | 0.00 |

=== In AFC U-23 Asian Cup ===
| Opponent | Pld | W | D | L | GF | GA | GD | Win % |
|---|---|---|---|---|---|---|---|---|
| Australia | 1 | 1 | 0 | 0 | 1 | 0 | +1 | 100.00 |
| China | 1 | 0 | 0 | 1 | 1 | 2 | −1 | 0.00 |
| Iraq | 1 | 0 | 0 | 1 | 1 | 3 | −2 | 0.00 |
| Japan | 3 | 0 | 0 | 3 | 1 | 7 | −6 | 0.00 |
| Jordan | 3 | 0 | 2 | 1 | 1 | 2 | −1 | 0.00 |
| North Korea | 2 | 1 | 1 | 0 | 2 | 0 | +2 | 50.00 |
| Qatar | 1 | 1 | 0 | 0 | 2 | 0 | +2 | 100.00 |
| Saudi Arabia | 1 | 0 | 0 | 1 | 0 | 2 | −2 | 0.00 |
| South Korea | 1 | 0 | 0 | 1 | 0 | 1 | −1 | 0.00 |
| Syria | 2 | 0 | 2 | 0 | 2 | 2 | +0 | 0.00 |
| Tajikistan | 1 | 1 | 0 | 0 | 2 | 0 | +2 | 100.00 |
| Uzbekistan | 1 | 0 | 0 | 1 | 1 | 5 | −4 | 0.00 |
| Vietnam | 3 | 1 | 1 | 1 | 5 | 5 | +0 | 33.33 |
| Yemen | 1 | 1 | 0 | 0 | 1 | 0 | +1 | 100.00 |
| Total | 22 | 6 | 6 | 10 | 20 | 29 | −9 | 27.27 |

=== In Football at the Asian Games ===
| Opponent | Pld | W | D | L | GF | GA | GD | Win % |
|---|---|---|---|---|---|---|---|---|
| Bangladesh | 1 | 1 | 0 | 0 | 3 | 0 | +3 | 100.00 |
| China | 1 | 0 | 0 | 1 | 1 | 2 | −1 | 0.00 |
| Hong Kong | 1 | 0 | 1 | 0 | 1 | 1 | +0 | 0.00 |
| India | 1 | 1 | 0 | 0 | 5 | 0 | +5 | 100.00 |
| Indonesia | 2 | 0 | 2 | 0 | 4 | 4 | +0 | 0.00 |
| Iran | 1 | 0 | 0 | 1 | 1 | 3 | −2 | 0.00 |
| Iraq | 2 | 1 | 0 | 1 | 2 | 5 | −3 | 50.00 |
| Japan | 3 | 1 | 0 | 2 | 1 | 2 | −1 | 33.33 |
| Jordan | 2 | 0 | 1 | 1 | 1 | 2 | −1 | 0.00 |
| Kuwait | 2 | 0 | 0 | 2 | 1 | 7 | −6 | 0.00 |
| Myanmar | 1 | 1 | 0 | 0 | 2 | 0 | +2 | 100.00 |
| North Korea | 5 | 0 | 4 | 1 | 1 | 2 | −1 | 0.00 |
| Oman | 1 | 0 | 1 | 0 | 0 | 0 | +0 | 0.00 |
| Pakistan | 1 | 1 | 0 | 0 | 1 | 0 | +1 | 100.00 |
| Qatar | 2 | 0 | 1 | 1 | 3 | 6 | −3 | 0.00 |
| South Korea | 2 | 1 | 0 | 1 | 2 | 2 | +0 | 50.00 |
| Syria | 1 | 0 | 0 | 1 | 0 | 1 | −1 | 0.00 |
| Thailand | 2 | 1 | 0 | 1 | 3 | 4 | −1 | 50.00 |
| Timor-Leste | 1 | 1 | 0 | 0 | 4 | 1 | +3 | 100.00 |
| Uzbekistan | 2 | 1 | 0 | 1 | 4 | 2 | +2 | 50.00 |
| Vietnam | 3 | 1 | 2 | 0 | 4 | 2 | +2 | 33.33 |
| Yemen | 1 | 1 | 0 | 0 | 2 | 1 | +1 | 100.00 |
| Total | 39 | 12 | 13 | 14 | 47 | 48 | −1 | 30.77 |

== See also ==
- United Arab Emirates national football team
- United Arab Emirates national under-20 football team
- United Arab Emirates national under-17 football team
