= Ryūnosuke Satō =

Japanese footballer (born 2006)

Personal information
- Date of birth: 16 October 2006 (age 20)
- Place of birth: Nishitokyo, Tokyo, Japan
- Height: 1.71 m (5 ft 7 in)
- Position: Attacking midfielder

Team information
- Current team: Valencia
- Number: 39

Youth career
- 2013: Hekizan SC
- 2014–2018: JACPA Tokyo
- 2016–2023: FC Tokyo

Senior career*
Years	Team	Apps	(Gls)
2023–2026	FC Tokyo	3	(0)
2025	→ Fagiano Okayama (loan)	28	(6)
2026–	Valencia	5	(0)

International career^{‡}
2022	Japan U16	5	(1)
2023	Japan U17	10	(3)
2023	Japan U18	2	(0)
2024	Japan U19	5	(1)
2024–2025	Japan U20	13	(4)
2024–	Japan U23	3	(1)
2025–	Japan	5	(0)
Medal record
Men's football
Representing Japan
AFC U-23 Asian Cup
Winner	2026 Saudi Arabia
- * Club domestic league appearances and goals as of 18 September 2026 ‡ National team caps and goals as of 6 March 2026

Ryūnosuke Satō (佐藤 龍之介, Satō Ryūnosuke; born 16 October 2006) is a Japanese footballer who plays as an attacking midfielder for La Liga club Valencia, and the Japan national team.

== Club career ==
=== Tokyo ===
==== Early career ====
Born in Nishitokyo, Tokyo, Satō began his career with Hekizan SC in 2013, before moving to JACPA Tokyo, graduating from the programme in 2018. Enrolled in the academy of professional side Tokyo since 2016, where he played at their facility in Kodaira, he was moved to their Musashi team in 2019.

Having watched him play at under-13 level, FC Tokyo's then-academy director Takashi Okuhara stated that, while he showed good technique, he was physically weak and did not show enough determination. At national team training sessions while still an under-13 player, he set himself the goal of reaching the 2023 FIFA U-17 World Cup, having been pushed by coaches Yoshiro Moriyama and Nozomi Hiroyama.

==== 2023–2024: First-team debut ====
He made his professional debut for FC Tokyo on 8 March 2023, starting in their 1–0 J.League Cup loss to Cerezo Osaka. In making his debut, he became the youngest player to ever play for FC Tokyo, beating the record held by Takefusa Kubo. On 26 August 2023 Satō signed his first professional contract with FC Tokyo. Having only featured in three league games in the 2024 season, Satō expressed his disappointment at not featuring more often, stating it had affected him mentally.

==== 2025: Loan to Fagiano Okayama ====
In January 2025, Satō joined fellow-J1 League side Fagiano Okayama on a year-long loan deal. He scored for Fagiano Okayama in the inaugural "China Derby" against fellow-Chūgoku region-based side Sanfrecce Hiroshima on 12 April 2025, the only goal in Fagiano Okayama's 1–0 win. This goal was his second for the club, having already scored against Cerezo Osaka the week before, and he followed it with a goal in Fagiano Okayama's next match against Kashima Antlers. This run of goalscoring form led him to being named April's J1 League Young Player of the Month.

Further J1 League Young Player of the Month awards followed in both July and October, as his performances continued to draw plaudits from Japanese media. At the end of the season, he was named the J1 League Young Player of the Year, highlighting a successful personal campaign with Fagiano Okayama as he helped the club to a 13th-place finish in their first year in the J1 League.

=== Valencia ===
On 7 July 2026, Satō signed for Valencia on a contract until 2031, with the intention of becoming the first Japanese player to play for the first team.

== International career ==
=== Youth ===
Having returned early from the 2024 Maurice Revello Tournament after withdrawing from the squad, Satō was called up to the Japan under-23 side for a friendly against France on 17 July 2024. Just one week later he featured for Japan's under-19 side, scoring two goals against the Ryukoku University in a 4–2 training match win.

Called up to the under-20 side for the 2025 AFC U-20 Asian Cup, Satō featured in four of Japan's five games, scoring in their 3–0 win against Thailand. He later expressed his disappointment in not being able to help Japan win the tournament, after they were knocked out in the semi-final by Australia. He was called up to the under-20 side again for the 2025 FIFA U-20 World Cup, stating that his "personal goal is to score three goals and get three assists, and as a team, I want to aim to win the championship".

=== Senior ===
In June 2025, he was called up to the Japan national football team for the third round of 2026 FIFA World Cup qualification. In making his debut against Indonesia in Japan's 6–0 win on 12 June 2025, he beat Shinji Kagawa's record as the youngest player to represent Japan in World Cup qualification, as well as being the fourth-youngest player to ever play for Japan. After his fifth cap, in a 2–0 friendly win against Ghana, Satō expressed his desire to beat Nobutoshi Kaneda's record as Japan's youngest goal-scorer.

== Style of play ==
Primarily a midfielder, capable of playing in both attacking and defensive roles, Satō was utilised as a right-winger and a wing-back during his time with Fagiano Okayama. He is known for his stamina, able to cover vast distances in games.

== Career statistics ==
=== Club ===
As of 6 March 2026

Appearances and goals by club, season and competition
Club	Season	League			National Cup (Note: Includes Emperor's Cup, Copa del Rey)		League Cup (Note: Includes J.League Cup)		Other		Total	
Club	Season	Division	Apps	Goals	Apps	Goals	Apps	Goals	Apps	Goals	Apps	Goals
FC Tokyo	2023	J1 League	0	0	0	0	2	0	0	0	2	0
FC Tokyo	2024	J1 League	3	0	1	0	1	0	0	0	5	0
FC Tokyo	2025	J1 League	0	0	0	0	0	0	0	0	0	0
FC Tokyo	2026	–							4 (Note: Appearances in the J1 100 Year Vision League)	0	4	0
FC Tokyo	Total		3	0	1	0	3	0	4	0	11	0
Fagiano Okayama (loan)	2025	J1 League	28	6	0	0	0	0	0	0	28	6
Valencia	2026–27	La Liga	0	0	0	0	–		–		0	0
Career total			31	6	1	0	3	0	4	0	39	6

=== International ===
As of match played 10 December 2025.

National team	Year	Apps	Goals
Japan	2025	5	0
Total		5	0

== Honours ==
Japan

- EAFF Championship: 2025

Japan U23

- AFC U-23 Asian Cup: 2026

Individual

- Asian Young Footballer of the Year: 2026
- AFC U-23 Asian Cup Most Valuable Player: 2026
- AFC U-23 Asian Cup top goalscorer: 2026 (Note: Tied with Ali Azaizeh, Nguyễn Đình Bắc, and Leonardo Farah Shahin)
- J1 League Young Player of the Month: April 2025, July 2025, October 2025
- J.League Best Young Player: 2025
- J1 100 Year Vision League Regional Round East Best Eleven: 2026
