= Saidumarkhon Saidnurullaev =

Uzbek footballer

Personal information
- Date of birth: 13 April 2005 (age 21)
- Place of birth: Andijan, Uzbekistan
- Height: 1.85 m (6 ft 1 in)
- Position: Forward

Team information
- Current team: Metallurg
- Number: 8

Youth career
- -2023: Pakhtakor (U19)

Senior career*
Years	Team	Apps	(Gls)
2023–	Pakhtakor	9	(0)
2025	→ Andijon (loan)	10	(0)
2026–	→ Metallurg (loan)	16	(5)

International career^{‡}
2022–2023	Uzbekistan U18	6	(0)
2024–2025	Uzbekistan U20	18	(7)
2025–2026	Uzbekistan U21	6	(0)
2026–	Uzbekistan U23	10	(3)
- * Club domestic league appearances and goals as of 2 September 2026 ‡ National team caps and goals as of 15 September 2026

Saidumarkhon Saidnurullaev (Uzbek: Саидумархон Саиднуруллаев) is an Uzbekistani footballer. He plays as a forward for Metallurg on loan from Pakhtakor and Uzbekistan national under-23 football team.

== Career ==
=== Clubs ===
Born on 13 April 2005 in Andijan Region. Player of Pakhtakor football academy. Made his Super League debut for Pakhtakor and is under contract with the club until the end of 2027. In 2023, he became an Uzbekistan champion and Cup winner with Pakhtakor. During the 2025 season, he played on loan for FC Andijon, making 10 appearances. In February 2026, he joined Metallurg Bekabad on loan until the end of the year.

=== National teams ===
Saidnurullaev featured for Uzbekistan U23 during the 2026 AFC U-23 Asian Cup held in Saudi Arabia. On 13 January 2026, he came on as a second-half substitute and scored a goal in Uzbekistan's 2-0 group stage victory against South Korea U23.

Across all international levels, he has represented Uzbekistan across youth setups, including 17 caps and 7 goals for the U-20 team, before establishing himself in the U-23 squad.
