= Uzbekistan national under-23 football team =

National association football team

Uzbekistan U-23
- Nickname: White Wolves
- Association: Uzbekistan Football Association
- Confederation: AFC (Asia)
- Head coach: Ravshan Khaydarov
- Captain: Diyor Ortikboev
- Home stadium: Jar Stadium
- FIFA code: UZB
First colours	Second colours

First international
- Kyrgyzstan 1–5 Uzbekistan (Bishkek, Kyrgyzstan; 20 May 1995)

Biggest win
- Uzbekistan 10–0 Hong Kong (Tashkent, Uzbekistan; 9 September 2023)

Biggest defeat
- Iran 6–1 Uzbekistan (Tehran, Iran; 23 January 2004)

Olympic Games
- Appearances: 1 (first in 2024)
- Best result: Group stage (2024)

Asian Games
- Appearances: 7 (first in 2002)
- Best result: Bronze medalists (2022)

AFC U-23 Asian Cup
- Appearances: 7 (first in 2013)
- Best result: Champions (2018)

The Uzbekistan national under-23 football team (Uzbek: Futbol bo'yicha O'zbekiston U-23 terma jamoasi) represents Uzbekistan in international U-23 football competitions. The team is controlled by the Uzbekistan Football Association, and is a member of the Asian Football Confederation.

== Competitive record ==
=== Olympic Games ===
Summer Olympics record
Year	Result	Position	Pld	W	D	L	GF	GA	Squad
(Spain) 1992	Not an IOC member								
(United States) 1996	Did not qualify								
(Australia) 2000	Did not qualify								
(Greece) 2004	Did not qualify								
(China) 2008	Did not qualify								
(United Kingdom) 2012	Did not qualify								
(Brazil) 2016	Did not qualify								
(Japan) 2020	Did not qualify								
(France) 2024	Group stage	13th	3	0	1	2	2	4	Squad
(United States) 2028	To be determined								
(Australia) 2032	To be determined								
Total	Group stage	1/8	3	0	1	2	2	4	—

==== Match history ====
Summer Olympics history
Year	Round	Opponent	Score	Result
2024	Group stage	Spain	1–2	Loss
2024	Group stage	Egypt	0–1	Loss
2024	Group stage	Dominican Republic	1–1	Draw

=== AFC U-23 Asian Cup ===
AFC U-23 Asian Cup record										Qualifier record					
Year	Result	Position	GP	W	D	L	GS	GA	Squad	GP	W	D	L	GS	GA
(Oman) 2013	Group stage	12th	3	1	0	2	3	4	Squad	4	2	1	1	8	7
(Qatar) 2016	Group stage	9th	3	1	0	2	6	6	Squad	3	2	0	1	7	2
(China) 2018	Champions	1st	6	5	0	1	12	3	Squad	3	3	0	0	7	1
(Thailand) 2020	Fourth place	4th	6	2	1	3	9	6	Squad	2	1	1	0	3	0
(Uzbekistan) 2022	Runners-up	2nd	6	3	2	1	12	5	Squad	3	2	1	0	13	3
(Qatar) 2024	Runners-up	2nd	6	5	0	1	14	1	Squad	3	3	0	0	19	1
(Saudi Arabia) 2026	Quarter-finals	5th	4	2	2	0	5	2	Squad	3	2	1	0	8	3
(Japan) 2028	To be determined									To be determined					
Total	1 Title	7/8	34	19	5	10	61	27	—	21	15	4	2	65	17

==== Match history ====
AFC U-23 Asian Cup
Year	Round	Opponent	Score	Result
2013	Group stage	China	2–1	Win
2013	Group stage	Iraq	1–2	Loss
2013	Group stage	Saudi Arabia	0–1	Loss
2016	Group stage	South Korea	1–2	Loss
2016	Group stage	Iraq	2–3	Loss
2016	Group stage	Yemen	3–1	Win
2018	Group stage	Qatar	0–1	Loss
2018	Group stage	China	1–0	Win
2018	Group stage	Oman	1–0	Win
2018	Quarter-finals	Japan	4–0	Win
2018	Semi-finals	South Korea	4–1	Win
2018	Final	Vietnam	2–1	Win
2020	Group stage	Iran	1–1	Draw
2020	Group stage	China	2–0	Win
2020	Group stage	South Korea	1–2	Loss
2020	Quarter-finals	United Arab Emirates	5–1	Win
2020	Semi-finals	Saudi Arabia	0–1	Loss
2020	3rd place match	Australia	0–1	Loss
2022	Group stage	Turkmenistan	1–0	Win
2022	Group stage	Qatar	6–0	Win
2022	Group stage	Iran	1–1	Draw
2022	Quarter-finals	Iraq	2–2; 3–2	Draw; Win
2022	Semi-finals	Japan	2–0	Win
2022	Final	Saudi Arabia	0–2	Loss
2024	Group stage	Malaysia	2–0	Win
2024	Group stage	Kuwait	5–0	Win
2024	Group stage	Vietnam	3–0	Win
2024	Quarter-finals	Saudi Arabia	2–0	Win
2024	Semi-finals	Indonesia	2–0	Win
2024	Final	Japan	0–1	Loss
2026	Group stage	Lebanon	3–2	Win
2026	Group stage	Iran	0–0	Draw
2026	Group stage	South Korea	2–0	Win
2026	Quarter-finals	China	0–0; 2–4	Draw; Loss

=== Asian Games ===
Asian Games record
Year	Result	Position	Pld	W	D	L	GF	GA	Squad
(South Korea) 2002^{1}	Group stage	16th	3	1	0	2	2	4	Squad
(Qatar) 2006	Quarter-finals	6th	4	3	0	1	7	4	Squad
(China) 2010	Quarter-finals	8th	5	2	0	3	5	7	Squad
(South Korea) 2014	Round of 16	9th	4	2	1	1	11	4	Squad
(Indonesia) 2018	Quarter-finals	5th	5	4	0	1	16	4	Squad
(China) 2022	Bronze medal	3rd	6	5	0	1	12	4	Squad
(Japan) 2026	Fourth place	4th	6	4	2	0	15	4	
Total	1 Bronze medal	7/7	33	21	3	9	68	31	—

Since the 2002 Asian Games the age limit for men's teams is under-23, plus up to three over aged players for each squad.

== Results and fixtures ==
Win Draw Loss

=== 2025 ===
12 November 2025 Panda Cup	South Korea	2–0	Uzbekistan	Chengdu, China
--:-- UTC+4				Stadium: Chengdu Sports Centre

15 November 2025 Panda Cup	Uzbekistan	1–0	Vietnam	Chengdu, China
--:-- UTC+4				Stadium: Chengdu Sports Centre

18 November 2025 Panda Cup	China	0–0	Uzbekistan	Chengdu, China
--:-- UTC+4				Stadium: Chengdu Sports Centre

27 December Closed-door friendly	Jordan	0–0	Uzbekistan	Doha, Qatar
17:00 (UTC+3)				Stadium: Suheim bin Hamad Stadium

=== 2026 ===
7 January 2026 2026 AFC U-23 Asian Cup GS	Uzbekistan	3–2	Lebanon	Riyadh, Saudi Arabia
17:00 UTC+3	Saidov 24'; Khayrullaev 50'; Bakhromov 57'	Report	Shahin 65', 90+5'	Stadium: Prince Faisal bin Fahd Sports City Stadium; Attendance: 226; Referee: Tuan Yaasin (Malaysia)

10 January 2026 2026 AFC U-23 Asian Cup GS	Iran	0–0	Uzbekistan	Riyadh, Saudi Arabia
17:00		Report		Stadium: Prince Faisal bin Fahd Sports City Stadium; Attendance: 140; Referee: Abdullah Jamali (Kuwait)

13 January 2026 AFC U-23 Asian Cup GS	Uzbekistan	2–0	South Korea	Riyadh, Saudi Arabia
14:30 UTC+3	Karimov 48'; Saidnurullaev 70'	Report		Stadium: Prince Faisal bin Fahd Sports City Stadium; Referee: Qasim Al-Hatmi (Oman)

17 January 2026 AFC U-23 Asian Cup	Uzbekistan	0–0 (a.e.t.) (2–4 p)	China	Jeddah, Saudi Arabia
14:30		Report		Stadium: Prince Abdullah Al-Faisal Sports City Stadium; Attendance: 578; Referee: Ammar Mahfoodh (Bahrain)
	Penalties
	Bakhromov (penalty scored); Saidnurullaev (penalty scored); Karimov (penalty missed); Abdullaev (penalty missed)		(penalty scored) Liu Haofan; (penalty scored) Peng Xiao; (penalty scored) Xiang Yuwang; (penalty missed) Yang Haoyu; (penalty scored) Wang Bohao

September 15 2026 Asian Games	Uzbekistan	5–1	Philippines	Nagoya, Japan
15:30 UTC+9	Urinboev 30'; Saidnurullaev 60', 71'; Fayzullaev 73'; Reimov 80'	Report	Meriño 62'	Stadium: CS Asset Minato Soccer Stadium; Attendance: 306; Referee: Jin Jingyuan (China)

18 September 2026 Asian Games GS	Kuwait	0–2	Uzbekistan	Nagoya, Japan
19:00 UTC+9		Report	Bakhromov 6', 36'	Stadium: CS Asset Minato Soccer Stadium; Attendance: 638; Referee: Sami Al-Ismail (Saudi Arabia)

22 September 2026 Asian Games GS	Vietnam	0–2	Uzbekistan	Nagoya, Japan
14:00 UTC+9		Report	Urinboev 5'; Ibraimov 67'	Stadium: Paloma Mizuho Rugby Stadium; Attendance: 4,134; Referee: Meder Taichiev (Kyrgyzstan)

30 September Asian Games SF	Uzbekistan	1–1 (a.e.t.) (8–9 p)	Japan	Osaka, Japan
19:30 UTC+9	Bakhromov 8'	Report	Ishibashi 88'	Stadium: Nagai Stadium; Attendance: 15,550; Referee: Abdulhadi Al-Ruaile (Qatar)
	Penalties
	Bakhromov (penalty scored); Tulkinbekov (penalty missed); Murtazaev (penalty scored); Reimov (penalty scored); Shodiboev (penalty scored); Rizakulov (penalty scored); Fayzullaev (penalty scored); Khamidov (penalty scored); Ibraimov (penalty scored); Khushvaktov (penalty missed)		(penalty scored) Nakajima; (penalty scored) Ozeki; (penalty scored) Ishiwatari; (penalty missed) Nwadike; (penalty scored) Tsuchiya; (penalty scored) Shimamoto; (penalty scored) Yokoyama; (penalty scored) Umeki; (penalty scored) Nagano; (penalty scored) Kosugi

== Coaching staff ==
Position	Name
Head coach	(Uzbekistan) Ravshan Khaydarov
Assistant coach	Vacant
Fitness coach	Vacant
Goalkeeper coach	Vacant
Fitness coach	(Uzbekistan) Artem Davletov

== Managers ==
- (Uzbekistan) Mirzohim Ghulomov and
  (Uzbekistan) Aleksander Ivankov, U22 (1995)
- (Uzbekistan) Viktor Borisov, U22 (1999)
- (Uzbekistan) Viktor Borisov, U22 (2003)
- (Uzbekistan) Rauf Inileev, U23 (2006)
- (Uzbekistan) Vadim Abramov, U22 (2007)
- (Uzbekistan) Akhmad Ubaydullaev, U23 (2010)
- (Uzbekistan) Vadim Abramov, U22- U23 (2011–2012)
- (Uzbekistan) Aleksey Evstafeev, U21–U22 (2012–2013)
- (Uzbekistan) Mirjalol Qosimov, U23 (2014)
- (Uzbekistan) Shukhrat Maqsudov, U22 (2014–2015)
- (Uzbekistan) Bakhtiyor Ashurmatov, U22 (2015)
- (Uzbekistan) Viktor Djalilov, U22 (2015)
- (Uzbekistan) Samvel Babayan, U22–U23 (2015–2016)
- (Uzbekistan) Jasur Abduraimov, U21–U22 (2016–2017)
- (Uzbekistan) Ravshan Khaydarov, U22–U23 (2017–2018)
- (Serbia) Ljubinko Drulović, U22–U23 (2019–2020)
- (Uzbekistan) Timur Kapadze, U23 (2021–2024)
- (Uzbekistan) Ravshan Khaydarov, U23 (since 2025)

== Players ==
=== Uzbekistan ===
Uzbekistan announced their initial 23-men squad for the Olympic Games on 3 July 2024. The squad was reduced to 22 players on 9 July.

Head coach: Timur Kapadze

No.	Pos.	Player	Date of birth (age)	Caps	Goals	Club
1	GK	Abduvohid Nematov	20 March 2001 (aged 23)	23	0	(Uzbekistan Football Association) Nasaf
2	DF	Saidazamat Mirsaidov	19 July 2001 (aged 23)	26	1	(Uzbekistan Football Association) Olympic Tashkent
3	DF	Abdukodir Khusanov	29 February 2004 (aged 20)	6	0	(The Football Association) Manchester City
4	DF	Husniddin Aliqulov*	4 April 1999 (aged 25)	18	0	(Turkish Football Federation) Çaykur Rizespor
5	DF	Mukhammadkodir Khamraliev	6 July 2001 (aged 23)	33	2	(Uzbekistan Football Association) Pakhtakor
6	DF	Ibrokhimkhalil Yuldoshev	14 February 2001 (aged 23)	20	0	(Kazakhstan Football Federation) Kairat
7	FW	Abbosbek Fayzullaev	3 October 2003 (aged 20)	14	3	(Russian Football Union) CSKA Moscow
8	FW	Ruslanbek Jiyanov	5 June 2001 (aged 23)	37	3	(Uzbekistan Football Association) Navbahor Namangan
9	FW	Khusayin Norchaev	6 February 2002 (aged 22)	32	15	(Uzbekistan Football Association) Neftchi Fergana
10	MF	Jasurbek Jaloliddinov	15 May 2002 (aged 22)	44	11	(Uzbekistan Football Association) Neftchi Fergana
11	FW	Oston Urunov*	29 December 2000 (aged 23)	4	0	(Football Federation Islamic Republic of Iran) Persepolis
12	GK	Vladimir Nazarov	8 June 2002 (aged 22)	23	0	(Uzbekistan Football Association) Pakhtakor
13	DF	Zafarmurod Abdurakhmatov	28 April 2003 (aged 21)	4	0	(Uzbekistan Football Association) Nasaf
14	FW	Eldor Shomurodov* (captain)	29 June 1995 (aged 29)	3	0	(Italian Football Federation) Roma
15	MF	Umarali Rakhmonaliev	18 August 2003 (aged 20)	16	3	(Russian Football Union) Rubin Kazan
16	DF	Asadbek Rakhimzhonov	17 February 2004 (aged 20)	14	0	(Uzbekistan Football Association) Olympic Tashkent
17	MF	Diyor Kholmatov	22 July 2002 (aged 22)	20	2	(Uzbekistan Football Association) Pakhtakor
18	MF	Abdurauf Buriev	20 July 2002 (aged 22)	33	0	(Uzbekistan Football Association) Olympic Tashkent

* Overage player.

Unenrolled alternate players
No.	Pos.	Player	Date of birth (age)	Caps	Goals	Club
19	MF	Ibrokhim Ibrokhimov	12 January 2001 (aged 23)	23	0	(Uzbekistan Football Association) Olympic Tashkent
20	FW	Alisher Odilov	15 July 2001 (aged 23)	34	12	(Russian Football Union) Khimki
21	GK	Khamidillo Abdunabiev	20 August 2002 (aged 21)	8	0	(Uzbekistan Football Association) Olympic Tashkent
22	MF	Bekhruz Askarov	8 March 2003 (aged 21)	4	0	(Uzbekistan Football Association) Pakhtakor

=== Recent call-ups ===
The following players have been called for the last 12 months and are still eligible to represent.

Pos.	Player	Date of birth (age)	Caps	Goals	Club	Latest call-up
^{INJ} Player withdrew from the squad due to an injury^{PRE} Preliminary squad^{WD} Player withdrawn from the squad.

== Overage players in Olympic Games ==
Tournament	Player 1	Player 2	Player 3
2024	Eldor Shomurodov (FW)	Oston Urunov (MF)	Husniddin Aliqulov (DF)

== Head-to-head record ==
As of 18 September 2026, after the match against
Kuwait.

The following table shows Uzbekistan under-23 team's all-time international record.

Against	Played	Won	Drawn	Lost	GF	GA	GD	Confederation
Afghanistan	2	2	0	0	13	1	+12	AFC
Albania	1	0	0	1	0	1	-1	UEFA
Australia	3	1	1	1	2	1	+1	AFC
Bahrain	4	0	1	3	2	8	-6	AFC
Bangladesh	6	6	0	0	21	1	+20	AFC
Canada	1	0	0	1	0	1	-1	CONCACAF
China	11	6	4	1	11	6	+5	AFC
Dominican Republic	1	0	1	0	1	1	+0	CONCACAF
Egypt	5	2	0	3	7	7	+0	CAF
Finland	1	1	0	0	2	0	+2	UEFA
France	1	0	0	1	1	2	-1	UEFA
Honduras	1	0	0	1	2	4	-2	CONCACAF
Hong Kong	9	7	1	1	24	3	+21	AFC
India	2	2	0	0	5	0	+5	AFC
Indonesia	1	1	0	0	2	0	+2	AFC
Iran	9	3	3	3	11	14	-4	AFC
Iraq	8	3	2	3	18	15	+3	AFC
Israel	1	1	0	0	2	0	+2	UEFA
Ivory Coast	1	0	1	0	0	0	+0	CAF
Japan	7	3	1	4	10	7	+3	AFC
Jordan	5	2	2	1	7	6	+1	AFC
Kazakhstan	5	1	0	4	5	10	-5	UEFA
Kenya	2	1	0	1	2	2	+0	CAF
Kyrgyzstan	7	6	1	0	18	6	+12	AFC
Kuwait	3	3	0	0	12	1	+11	AFC
Lebanon	2	2	0	0	6	3	+3	AFC
Malaysia	2	2	0	0	5	1	+4	AFC
Mali	2	0	1	1	2	3	-1	CAF
Morocco	1	0	0	1	0	3	-3	CAF
Myanmar	2	1	1	0	4	3	+1	AFC
Nepal	2	2	0	0	6	2	+4	AFC
New Zealand	1	1	0	0	3	1	+2	OFC
North Korea	1	1	0	0	4	2	+2	AFC
Oman	5	2	2	1	2	2	+0	AFC
Palestine	3	2	0	1	5	3	+2	AFC
Philippines	2	2	0	0	8	1	+7	AFC
Qatar	10	8	1	1	25	5	+20	AFC
Russia	1	0	0	1	3	4	-1	UEFA
Saudi Arabia	11	3	3	5	14	15	-1	AFC
Serbia	1	1	0	0	2	0	+2	UEFA
Slovakia	1	0	0	1	0	2	-2	UEFA
Slovenia	1	1	0	0	3	0	+3	UEFA
South Korea	19	3	3	13	21	36	-15	AFC
Spain	2	0	1	1	1	2	-1	UEFA
Sri Lanka	1	1	0	0	4	0	+4	AFC
Syria	5	1	2	2	6	7	-4	AFC
Tajikistan	8	7	1	0	16	2	+14	AFC
Thailand	2	2	0	0	6	2	+4	AFC
Togo	1	1	0	0	5	3	+2	CAF
Turkmenistan	3	2	1	0	5	1	+4	AFC
United Arab Emirates	14	7	3	4	20	14	+6	AFC
Ukraine	1	0	1	0	1	1	+0	UEFA
Vietnam	10	6	4	0	13	5	+8	AFC
Yemen	4	3	1	0	8	2	+6	AFC
Zimbabwe	1	0	1	0	1	1	+0	CAF
Against	Played	Won	Drawn	Lost	GF	GA	GD	Confederation

== See also ==
- Uzbekistan national under-20 football team
- Uzbekistan national under-17 football team
- Uzbekistan national football team
