= 2020 AFC U-23 Championship final =

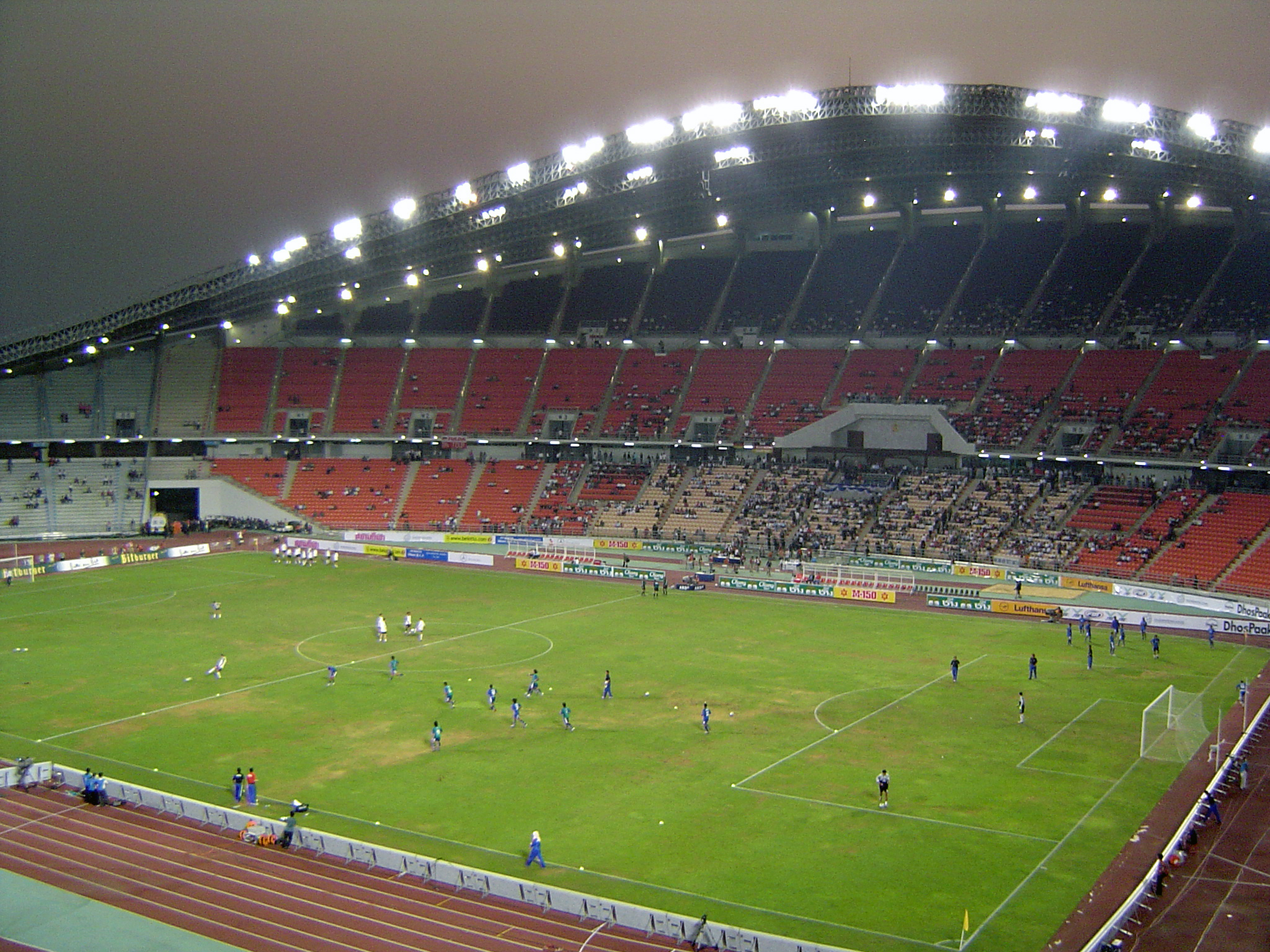
- Rajamangala Stadium in Bangkok hosted the final.
- Event: 2020 AFC U-23 Championship
South Korea	Saudi Arabia
(South Korea)	(Saudi Arabia)
1	0
- After extra time
- Date: 26 January 2020
- Venue: Rajamangala Stadium, Bangkok
- Referee: Chris Beath (Australia)
- Weather: Partly cloudy 28 °C (82 °F)

The 2020 AFC U-23 Championship final was a football match that took place on 26 January 2020 at the Rajamangala Stadium in Bangkok, Thailand, to determine the winners of the 2020 AFC U-23 Championship. The match was contested by South Korea and Saudi Arabia, the winners of the semi-finals.

South Korea beat Saudi Arabia after extra time and took their first trophy in the contest.

== Route to the final ==
South Korea
Round
Saudi Arabia
Opponents
Result
Group stage
Opponents
Result
China
1–0
Match 1
Japan
2–1
Iran
2–1
Match 2
Qatar
0–0
Uzbekistan
2–1
Match 3
Syria
1–0
Group C Winner

Pos	Team	Pld	Pts
1	South Korea	3	9
2	Uzbekistan	3	4
3	Iran	3	4
4	China	3	0

Source: AFC
Final standings
Group B Winner

Pos	Team	Pld	Pts
1	Saudi Arabia	3	7
2	Syria	3	4
3	Qatar	3	3
4	Japan	3	1

Source: AFC
Opponents
Result
Knockout stage
Opponents
Result
Jordan
2–1
Quarter-finals
Thailand
1–0
Australia
2–0
Semi-finals
Uzbekistan
1–0

== Match ==
26 January 2020
19:30

South Korea	1–0 (a.e.t.)	Saudi Arabia
Jeong Tae-wook 113'

Rajamangala Stadium Bangkok
Attendance: 2,879
Referee: Chris Beath (Australia)

South Korea	Saudi Arabia

GK	1	Song Bum-keun	(yellow card) 120+3'
RB	2	Lee You-hyeon		(substituted off) 72'
CB	5	Jeong Tae-wook
CB	4	Lee Sang-min (c)
LB	3	Kang Yoon-sung
DM	20	Won Du-jae
DM	6	Kim Dong-hyun
CM	8	Kim Jin-gyu		(substituted off) 53'
RF	7	Jeong Woo-yeong		(substituted off) 46'
CF	18	Oh Se-hun
LF	13	Kim Jin-ya
Substitutions:
FW	11	Lee Dong-jun	(yellow card) 120'	(substituted on) 46'
MF	10	Lee Dong-gyeong		(substituted on) 53'
FW	14	Kim Dae-won		(substituted on) 72'	(substituted off) 115'
DF	15	Kim Tae-hyeon		(substituted on) 115'
Manager:
Kim Hak-bum

GK	22	Mohammed Al-Rubaie
RB	23	Saud Abdulhamid	(yellow card) 63'
CB	3	Abdulbasit Hindi	(yellow card) 42'
CB	4	Hassan Al-Tambakti (c)		(substituted off) 98'
LB	13	Khalid Al-Dubaysh	(yellow card) 109'
RM	18	Khalid Al-Ghannam		(substituted off) 59'
CM	20	Mukhtar Ali
CM	14	Ali Al-Hassan		(substituted off) 105'
LM	7	Abdulrahman Ghareeb
SS	15	Hussain Al-Eisa
CF	9	Abdullah Al-Hamdan		(substituted off) 67'
Substitutions:
FW	12	Ayman Yahya		(substituted on) 59'
FW	19	Firas Al-Buraikan		(substituted on) 67'
DF	5	Abdulelah Al-Amri		(substituted on) 98'
MF	8	Nasser Al-Omran		(substituted on) 105'
Manager:
Saad Al-Shehri

Match rules:

- 90 minutes.
- 30 minutes of extra time if necessary.
- Penalty shoot-out if scores still level.
- Maximum of three substitutions, one substitution added if extra time.

== See also ==
- 2020 AFC U-23 Championship
