= Odil Abdumajidov =

Uzbekistani footballer (born 2001)

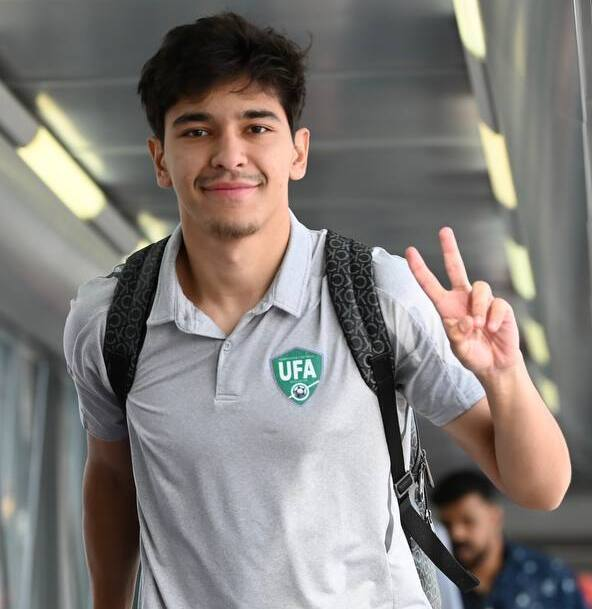

Personal information
- Date of birth: 1 June 2001 (age 25)
- Place of birth: Uzbekistan
- Height: 1.85 m (6 ft 1 in)
- Position: Defender

Team information
- Current team: Andijon
- Number: 2

Youth career
- 2018: Andijon
- 2019: Metallurg Bekabad

Senior career*
Years	Team	Apps	(Gls)
2019–2024	Metallurg Bekabad	22	(0)
2022–2024	→ Ordabasy (loan)	23	(2)
2023–2024	Olympic Tashkent (loan)	24	(1)
2024	Dinamo	9	(0)
2024	Metallurg	11	(1)
2025	Turan	12	(0)
2025	Shurtan	10	(0)
2026–	Andijon	8	(1)

International career^{‡}
2019	Uzbekistan U19	3	(0)
2020–	Uzbekistan U23	5	(0)
- * Club domestic league appearances and goals as of 29 July 2026 ‡ National team caps and goals as of 4 June 2022

Odil Abdumajidov (born 1 June 2001) is an Uzbek professional footballer who plays as a defender for Uzbekistan Super League club Andijon.

== Early life ==
Odil Abdumajidov was born on 1 June 2001 in Uzbekistan.

== Club career ==
Abdumajidov began his football career in 2019 with Metallurg Bekabad. On 17 August 2020, he made his debut in Uzbekistan Super League in a match against Bunyodkor.

At the beginning of 2022 season, he transferred to Kazakh club Ordabasy on loan. On 5 March 2022, in a match against the club Maktaaral, he made his debut in Kazakhstan Premier League.

Abdumajidov was loaned to Olympic Tashkent in 2023, then after another stint with Bekabad, he played for Dinamo Samarqand in 2024. The following year, he transferred to Turan. In the middle of 2025, he moved to Shurtan, and on 1 January 2026 to Andijon.

== International career ==
On 28 May 2021, he made his debut for the Uzbekistan youth team in a 2–0 win over Ukraine.

== Honours ==
Ordabasy

- Kazakhstan Cup: 2022
