= Leonardo Farah Shahin =

Footballer (born 2003)

- Shahin with Lebanon in 2024

Personal information
- Full name: Leonardo Farah Shahin
- Date of birth: 10 August 2003 (age 23)
- Place of birth: Mörlanda, Sweden
- Height: 1.83 m (6 ft 0 in)
- Position: Striker

Team information
- Current team: IK Oddevold
- Number: 10

Youth career
- 2009–2018: IFK Uddevalla
- 2019–2020: BK Häcken

Senior career*
Years	Team	Apps	(Gls)
2018	IFK Uddevalla	1	(0)
2020–2023	BK Häcken	1	(0)
2021	→ AFC Eskilstuna (loan)	2	(0)
2022	→ Qviding FIF (loan)	28	(12)
2023–2025	Falkenbergs FF	85	(19)
2026–	IK Oddevold	30	(18)

International career^{‡}
2021	Sweden U19	2	(0)
2026	Lebanon U23	3	(4)
2024–	Lebanon	8	(0)
- * Club domestic league appearances and goals as of 7 November 2026 ‡ National team caps and goals as of 13 November 2026

Leonardo Farah Shahin (Arabic: ليوناردو فرح شاهين; born 10 August 2003) is a footballer who plays as a striker for Swedish club IK Oddevold. Born in Sweden, he plays for the Lebanon national team.

Shahin began his senior career with IFK Uddevalla before joining BK Häcken in 2019. After loan spells with AFC Eskilstuna and Qviding FIF, he joined Falkenbergs FF in 2023 and helped the club win promotion to the Superettan in 2024. He joined IK Oddevold in 2025.

Shahin represented Sweden at under-19 level before choosing to play for Lebanon. He made his senior international debut in 2024 and later represented Lebanon at the 2026 AFC U-23 Asian Cup, finishing as the tournament's joint-top scorer.

== Club career ==
=== Early career ===
Shahin started his career at IFK Uddevalla in 2009, aged six. He made his debut in Division 2 on 1 September 2018, aged 15 years and 22 days, in a 3–2 defeat against Stenungsunds IF.

=== BK Häcken and loans ===
Shahin moved to BK Häcken's youth setup ahead of the 2019 season. During the 2020 season, he scored 44 goals in 20 games for the under-17s. He made his Allsvenskan debut on 3 October 2020, as a stoppage-time substitute in a 3–0 victory against Falkenbergs FF.

At the end of the season, Shahin signed his first professional team contract with BK Häcken, agreeing on a three-year deal despite interest from several Premier League clubs. According to Shahin, Fulham and Wolverhampton Wanderers had expressed interest in signing him for their under-23 teams before he signed his first professional contract with Häcken, but that the COVID-19 pandemic and Brexit prevented a move.

On 1 September 2021, he was loaned out to AFC Eskilstuna for one year, playing two games in the 2021 Superettan. On 14 February 2022, he was sent on another one-year loan, to Qviding FIF, where he scored 12 goals in 28 games in the Ettan.

=== Falkenbergs FF ===
Shahin with Falkenbergs FF in 2023

On 6 January 2023, Shahin joined Ettan club Falkenbergs FF. In 2023, he scored 11 goals in 29 league appearances, and helped Falkenberg reach the promotion play-offs. In 2024, he scored six goals and provided 10 assists, leading the league in assists, as Falkenberg finished first in Ettan Södra and earned promotion to the Superettan. Shahin made his Superettan debut in 2025, scoring two goals and providing four assists in 28 appearances. He left Falkenberg at the end of the 2025 season after three years at the club, having scored 21 goals and provided 22 assists in 90 appearances in all competitions.

=== IK Oddevold ===
On 20 December 2025, Shahin joined IK Oddevold ahead of the 2026 Superettan season on a two-year contract, returning to Uddevalla where he had played at youth level for IFK Uddevalla. He scored a penalty on his debut, on 22 February, in a 2–1 defeat to Häcken in the Svenska Cupen. Between 26 April and 23 May, he scored in six consecutive Superettan games, earning the Superettan Player of the Month award for May. On 18 August, Shahin scored a brace and provided an assist in a 2026–27 Svenska Cupen match against AFC Eskilstuna; IK Oddevold won on penalties after a 4–4 draw and advanced to the next round. On 23 August, he scored his first career hat-trick in a 3–1 Superettan victory over Helsingborgs IF. With 18 goals, Shahin finished the season as the second-top scorer of the league, and was named IK Oddevold Player of the Year.

== International career ==
Born in Sweden to Lebanese parents, Shahin was called up to a training camp for the Sweden U16 team in March 2019. In September 2021, he made two appearances for the Sweden U19 team, both in friendly matches against Finland.

Although he had represented Sweden at youth level, Shahin later said that he first seriously considered representing Lebanon after discussions with teammate Felix Michel Melki, another Swedish-born Lebanese international, during a loan spell at AFC Eskilstuna. He also stated that obtaining Lebanese citizenship documents took around eight to nine months because he had not previously been registered in Lebanon.

After obtaining his Lebanese passport, Shahin received his first call-up to the Lebanon national team on 15 December 2023, for a training camp in preparation for the 2023 AFC Asian Cup. However, due to paperwork issues, he was not included in the final tournament squad. His first official call-up was for Lebanon's 2026 FIFA World Cup qualification matches against Australia in March 2024. He made his debut on 11 June 2024 in a 2026 World Cup qualifier against Bangladesh at the Khalifa International Stadium in Qatar, substituting Omar Bugiel in the 61st minute of Lebanon's 4–0 victory.

Shahin was called up to the Lebanon national under-23 team for the 2026 AFC U-23 Asian Cup, held in Saudi Arabia in January 2026. He scored a brace in Lebanon's opening game on 7 January, in a 3–2 defeat to Uzbekistan. He scored two more goals in the group stage: one against South Korea (2–4) on 10 January, and a penalty against Iran (1–0) on 13 January, which gave an already-eliminated Lebanon their first-ever win in the tournament. With four goals in three games, Shahin finished as the tournament's joint-top scorer.

== Style of play ==
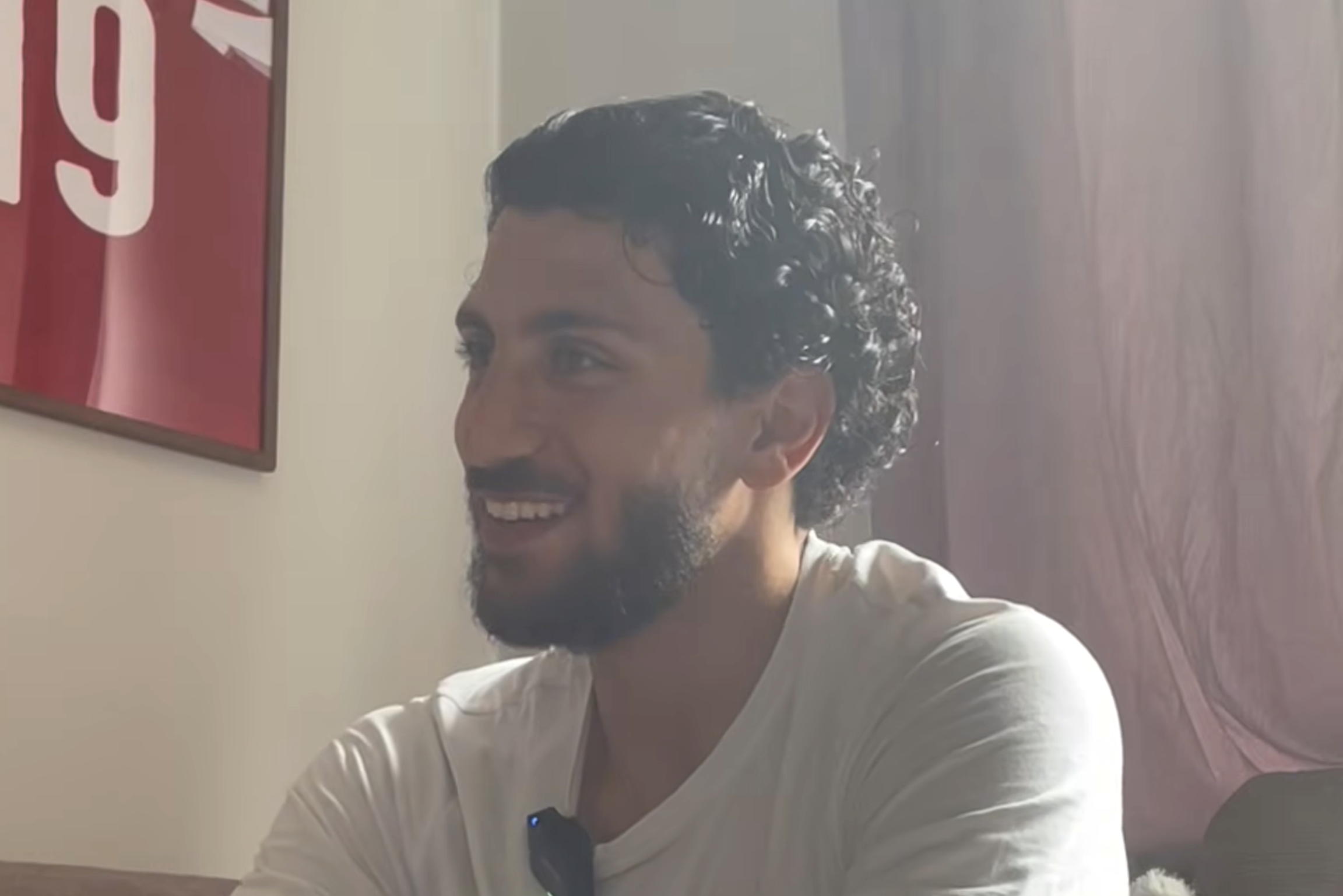
Shahin in 2026

Shahin is a mobile forward who mainly plays as a striker, and can also be deployed as a second striker or winger.

== Career statistics ==
=== Club ===
As of match played 7 November 2026

Appearances and goals by club, season and competition
Club	Season	League			Svenska Cupen		Other		Continental		Total	
Club	Season	Division	Apps	Goals	Apps	Goals	Apps	Goals	Apps	Goals	Apps	Goals
IFK Uddevalla	2018	Division 2	1	0	—		—		—		1	0
BK Häcken	2020	Allsvenskan	1	0	—		—		—		1	0
BK Häcken	2021	Allsvenskan	0	0	2	0	—		0	0	2	0
BK Häcken	Total		1	0	2	0	0	0	0	0	3	0
AFC Eskilstuna (loan)	2021	Superettan	2	0	—		—		—		2	0
Qviding FIF (loan)	2022	Ettan	28	12	—		—		—		28	12
Falkenbergs FF	2023	Ettan	29	11	2	2	2 (Note: Appearances in Ettan play-offs)	0	—		33	13
Falkenbergs FF	2024	Ettan	28	6	1	0	—		—		29	6
Falkenbergs FF	2025	Superettan	28	2	—		—		—		28	2
Falkenbergs FF	Total		85	19	3	2	2	0	0	0	90	21
IK Oddevold	2026	Superettan	30	18	4	3	—		—		34	21
Career total			147	49	9	5	2	0	0	0	158	54

=== International ===
As of match played 13 November 2026

Appearances and goals by national team and year
National team	Year	Apps	Goals
Lebanon	2024	4	0
Lebanon	2025	0	0
Lebanon	2026	4	0
Total		8	0

== Honours ==
Falkenberg

- Ettan: 2024 (Södra)

Individual

- AFC U-23 Asian Cup top goalscorer: 2026 (Note: Tied with Ali Azaizeh, Nguyễn Đình Bắc, and Ryūnosuke Satō)
- IK Oddevold Player of the Year: 2026

== See also ==
- List of Lebanon international footballers born outside Lebanon
- List of sportspeople who competed for more than one nation
