= Bader Nasser =

Bader Nasser may refer to:

- Bader Nasser (Saudi Arabian footballer) (born 2001), Saudi Arabian football right-back for Al-Batin
- Bader Nasser (Emirati footballer) (born 2001), Emirati football left-back for Shabab Al Ahli
