= 2025 Shaanxi Union F.C. season =

Chinese football club season

Shaanxi Union
2025 season
- Owner: Qin Ying Sports
- Chairman: Huang Shenghua
- Manager: Giovanni Franken
- Stadium: Shaanxi Province Stadium; Weinan Sports Center Stadium
- China League One: 9th

The 2025 season was the third season in the existence of Shaanxi Union Football Club, and their first ever season in China League One, the Chinese second-tier, following promotion in the previous season. In addition to the domestic league, the club also participated in the Chinese FA Cup. Shaanxi Union drew an average home attendance of 16,503 in 2025.

== Competitions ==
=== Overall record ===
Competition	First match	Last match	Starting round	Final position	Record							
Competition	First match	Last match	Starting round	Final position	Pld	W	D	L	GF	GA	GD	Win %
China League One	28 June	8 November	Matchday 1	9th	30	10	9	11	48	47	+1	33.33
Chinese FA Cup	19 April	21 June	Second round	Fourth round	4	3	0	1	7	3	+4	75.00
Total					34	13	9	12	55	50	+5	38.24

Source: Soccerway
