= 2013 AFC U-22 Championship =

بطولة آسيا تحت 22 سنة لكرة القدم 2013

Tournament details
- Host country: Oman
- Dates: 11–26 January 2014
- Teams: 16 (from 1 confederation)
- Venue: 3 (in 2 host cities)

Final positions
- Champions: Iraq (1st title)
- Runners-up: Saudi Arabia
- Third place: Jordan
- Fourth place: South Korea

Tournament statistics
- Matches played: 32
- Goals scored: 73 (2.28 per match)
- Attendance: 34,712 (1,085 per match)
- Top scorer(s): (Iran) Kaveh Rezaei (5 goals)
- Best player: (Iraq) Amjad Kalaf
- Fair play award: South Korea

The 2013 AFC U-22 Championship (also known as the 2013 AFC U-22 Asian Cup) was the first edition of the AFC U-22 Championship. The hosting rights for the tournament was awarded to Oman. It was set to take place between 23 June and 7 July 2013 but was postponed to be held between 11 and 26 January 2014 due to the 2013 EAFF East Asian Cup.

== Host selection ==
The AFC Competitions Committee awarded the hosting rights of the 2013 finals to Oman on 18 July 2012. Oman and Thailand were the only nations that came forward wanting to host.

== Qualification ==
The draw for the group stage of qualifying took place in Kuala Lumpur, Malaysia on 14 February 2012. 41 national teams are taking part in qualifying. All group matches were set to be held from 23 June to 3 July 2012 but were later changed to June 2–10, 2012 due to Nepal's request.

=== Qualified teams ===
For the draw, teams were seeded based on their performance in the 2010 AFC U-19 Championship.

Pot 1	Pot 2	Pot 3	Pot 4
Oman (Host); North Korea; Australia; Saudi Arabia	South Korea; Japan; Uzbekistan; United Arab Emirates	China; Syria; Iran; Jordan	Iraq; Yemen; Kuwait; Myanmar

== Venues ==
Muscat	2013 AFC U-22 Championship is located in Oman	Seeb
Royal Oman Police Stadium	2013 AFC U-22 Championship is located in Oman	Seeb Stadium
23°36′31″N 58°35′31″E	2013 AFC U-22 Championship is located in Oman	23°40′49″N 58°10′57″E
Capacity: 14,000	2013 AFC U-22 Championship is located in Oman	Capacity: 15,000
Muscat	2013 AFC U-22 Championship is located in Oman	
Sultan Qaboos Sports Complex	2013 AFC U-22 Championship is located in Oman	
23°36′31″N 58°35′31″E	2013 AFC U-22 Championship is located in Oman	
Capacity: 34,000	2013 AFC U-22 Championship is located in Oman	

== Squads ==
Only players born on or after 1 January 1991 were eligible to compete in the 2013 AFC U-22 Asian Cup.

== Group stage ==
The draw for the tournament was conducted on 24 August 2013 in Muscat.

If two or more teams are equal on points on completion of the group matches, the following criteria were applied to determine the rankings.

1. Greater number of points obtained in the group matches between the teams concerned;
2. Goal difference resulting from the group matches between the teams concerned;
3. Greater number of goals scored in the group matches between the teams concerned;
4. Goal difference in all the group matches;
5. Greater number of goals scored in all the group matches;
6. Kicks from the penalty mark if only two teams are involved and they are both on the field of play;
7. Fewer score calculated according to the number of yellow and red cards received in the group matches;
8. Drawing of lots.

All times are local (UTC+4).

=== Group A ===
Team	Pld	W	D	L	GF	GA	GD	Pts
Jordan	3	2	1	0	8	2	+6	7
South Korea	3	2	1	0	6	1	+5	7
Oman (H)	3	1	0	2	4	3	+1	3
Myanmar	3	0	0	3	1	13	−12	0

(H) Hosts
11 January 2014
17:00

South Korea	1–1	Jordan
Lim Chang-woo 43'	Report	Lim Chang-woo 31' (o.g.)

Royal Oman Police Stadium, Muscat
Attendance: 400
Referee: Amirul Izwan Yaacob (Malaysia)
11 January 2014
20:00

Oman	4–0	Myanmar
Saleh 28'; Al Hasani 62'; Al-Hamhami 73', 78'	Report

Sultan Qaboos Sports Complex, Muscat
Attendance: 4,000
Referee: Jumpei Iida (Japan)

13 January 2014
17:00

Myanmar	0–3	South Korea
	Report	Baek Sung-dong 32'; Yun Il-lok 61'; Moon Chang-jin 78'

Royal Oman Police Stadium, Muscat
Attendance: 103
Referee: Mohanad Qasim Sarray (Iraq)
13 January 2014
20:00

Jordan	1–0	Oman
Qwaider 59'	Report

Sultan Qaboos Sports Complex, Muscat
Attendance: 7,000
Referee: Liu Kwok Man (Hong Kong)

15 January 2014
20:00

Oman	0–2	South Korea
	Report	Kim Kyung-jung 62'; Yun Il-lok 80'

Sultan Qaboos Sports Complex, Muscat
Attendance: 6,000
Referee: Ma Ning (China PR)
15 January 2014
20:00

Jordan	6–1	Myanmar
Al-Dardour 29', 37', 79'; Za'tara 53'; Khadr 83'; Samir 90'	Report	Maung Maung Soe 27'

Royal Oman Police Stadium, Muscat
Attendance: 250
Referee: Fahad Al-Mirdasi (Saudi Arabia)

=== Group B ===
Team	Pld	W	D	L	GF	GA	GD	Pts
Syria	3	2	1	0	3	1	+2	7
United Arab Emirates	3	1	2	0	2	1	+1	5
North Korea	3	1	1	1	3	2	+1	4
Yemen	3	0	0	3	1	5	−4	0

11 January 2014
17:00

North Korea	3–1	Yemen
Jo Kwang 4', 56'; Pak Kwang-ryong 40'	Report	S. Hussein 23'

Seeb Stadium, Seeb
Attendance: 150
Referee: Muhammad Taqi (Singapore)
11 January 2014
20:00

United Arab Emirates	1–1	Syria
Saif 38'	Report	Mido 35'

Seeb Stadium, Seeb
Attendance: 220
Referee: Yaqoob Abdul Baki (Oman)

13 January 2014
17:00

Syria	1–0	North Korea
Al Nakdali 58'	Report

Seeb Stadium, Seeb
Attendance: 130
Referee: Hettikamkanamge Perera (Sri Lanka)
13 January 2014
20:00

Yemen	0–1	United Arab Emirates
	Report	Saeed 6'

Royal Oman Police Stadium, Muscat
Attendance: 200
Referee: Fahad Al-Mirdasi (Saudi Arabia)

15 January 2014
17:00

North Korea	0–0	United Arab Emirates
	Report

Seeb Stadium, Seeb
Attendance: 203
Referee: Jumpei Iida (Japan)
15 January 2014
17:00

Syria	1–0	Yemen
Al Nakdali 26'	Report

Royal Oman Police Stadium, Muscat
Attendance: 100
Referee: Mohanad Qasim Sarray (Iraq)

=== Group C ===
Team	Pld	W	D	L	GF	GA	GD	Pts
Australia	3	2	0	1	2	4	−2	6
Japan	3	1	2	0	7	3	+4	5
Iran	3	1	1	1	6	5	+1	4
Kuwait	3	0	1	2	1	4	−3	1

12 January 2014
17:00

Australia	1–0	Kuwait
Kitto 70'	Report

Royal Oman Police Stadium, Muscat
Attendance: 500
Referee: Ma Ning (China PR)
12 January 2014
20:00

Japan	3–3	Iran
Harakawa 9'; Asano 30'; Nakajima 66'	Report	Barzay 7'; Rezaei 49' (pen.), 55'

Royal Oman Police Stadium, Muscat
Attendance: 305
Referee: Fahad Al-Marri (Qatar)

14 January 2014
17:00

Iran	0–1	Australia
	Report	Skapetis 56'

Royal Oman Police Stadium, Muscat
Attendance: 250
Referee: Kim Jong-hyeok (Korea Republic)
14 January 2014
20:00

Kuwait	0–0	Japan
	Report

Royal Oman Police Stadium, Muscat
Attendance: 113
Referee: Muhammad Taqi (Singapore)

16 January 2014
17:00

Australia	0–4	Japan
	Report	Nakajima 18', 48' (pen.); Yajima 24'; Brown 45' (o.g.)

Royal Oman Police Stadium, Muscat
Attendance: 150
Referee: Mohammed Abdulla (United Arab Emirates)
16 January 2014
17:00

Iran	3–1	Kuwait
Rezaei 63', 67', 81'	Report	Alenezi 90+5'

Seeb Stadium, Seeb
Attendance: 250
Referee: Liu Kwok Man (Hong Kong)

=== Group D ===
Team	Pld	W	D	L	GF	GA	GD	Pts
Iraq	3	3	0	0	6	2	+4	9
Saudi Arabia	3	2	0	1	4	4	0	6
Uzbekistan	3	1	0	2	3	4	−1	3
China	3	0	0	3	2	5	−3	0

12 January 2014
17:00

Uzbekistan	2–1	China
Krimets 90+2'; Sergeev 90+4'	Report	Yang Chaosheng 35'

Seeb Stadium, Seeb
Attendance: 80
Referee: Kim Jong-hyeok (Korea Republic)
12 January 2014
20:00

Saudi Arabia	1–3	Iraq
Majrashi 89'	Report	Ismail 36'; Hussein 50', 69'

Seeb Stadium, Seeb
Attendance: 484
Referee: Mohammed Abdulla (United Arab Emirates)

14 January 2014
17:00

Iraq	2–1	Uzbekistan
Hussein 10'; Nadhim 38'	Report	Iskanderov 64'

Seeb Stadium, Seeb
Attendance: 510
Referee: Amirul Izwan Yaacob (Malaysia)
14 January 2014
20:00

China	1–2	Saudi Arabia
Luo Senwen 57'	Report	Asiri 47'; Hawsawi 77' (pen.)

Seeb Stadium, Seeb
Attendance: 200
Referee: Fahad Al-Marri (Qatar)

16 January 2014
20:00

Saudi Arabia	1–0	Uzbekistan
Sami 60'	Report

Seeb Stadium, Seeb
Attendance: 127
Referee: Muhammad Taqi (Singapore)
16 January 2014
20:00

China	0–1	Iraq
	Report	Hussein 14' (pen.)

Royal Oman Police Stadium, Muscat
Attendance: 300
Referee: Hettikamkanamge Perera (Sri Lanka)

== Knockout stage ==
In the knockout stage, extra time and penalty shoot-out are used to decide the winner if necessary.

Quarter-finals
19 January – Muscat
Jordan	1
United Arab Emirates	0
20 January – Muscat
Australia	1
Saudi Arabia	2
19 January – Seeb
Syria	1
South Korea	2
20 January – Seeb
Iraq	1
Japan	0

Semi-finals
23 January – Muscat
Jordan	1
Saudi Arabia	3
23 January – Seeb
South Korea	0
Iraq	1

Final
26 January – Seeb
Saudi Arabia	0
Iraq	1
Third place match
25 January – Seeb
Jordan (p)	0 (3)
South Korea	0 (2)

=== Quarter-finals ===
19 January 2014
17:00

Syria	1–2	South Korea
Mardikian 90+5'	Report	Baek Sung-dong 3'; Hwang Ui-jo 11'

Seeb Stadium, Seeb
Attendance: 300
Referee: Hettikamkanamge Perera (Sri Lanka)

19 January 2014
20:00

Jordan	1–0	United Arab Emirates
Daldoum 84'	Report

Sultan Qaboos Sports Complex, Muscat
Attendance: 800
Referee: Kim Jong-Hyeok (Korea Republic)

20 January 2014
17:00

Australia	1–2	Saudi Arabia
Skapetis 77' (pen.)	Report	Asiri 58'; Al-Ammar 62'

Royal Oman Police Stadium, Muscat
Attendance: 200
Referee: Jumpei Iida (Japan)

20 January 2014
20:00

Iraq	1–0	Japan
Kalaf 84'	Report

Seeb Stadium, Seeb
Attendance: 2,250
Referee: Mohd Amirul Izwan Bin Yaacob (Malaysia)

=== Semi-finals ===
23 January 2014
17:00

South Korea	0–1	Iraq
	Report	Nadhim 74'

Seeb Stadium, Seeb
Attendance: 2,600
Referee: Muhammad Taqi (Singapore)

23 January 2014
20:00

Jordan	1–3	Saudi Arabia
Al-Dardour 34'	Report	Al-Ammar 29'; Majrashi 65'; Asiri 90+2' (pen.)

Sultan Qaboos Sports Complex, Muscat
Attendance: 1,500
Referee: Fahad Al-Marri (Qatar)

=== Third place match ===
25 January 2014
19:30

Jordan	0–0 (a.e.t.)	South Korea
	Report
Penalties
Al-Dardour (penalty scored); Zahran (penalty scored); Al-Khawaldeh (penalty missed); Abu Amarah (penalty scored)	3–2	(penalty missed) Baek Sung-dong; (penalty missed) Moon Chang-Jin; (penalty scored) Nam Seung-woo; (penalty scored) Lim Chang-woo; (penalty missed) Yun Il-lok

Seeb Stadium, Seeb
Attendance: 337
Referee: Yaqoob Abdul Baki (Oman)

=== Final ===
26 January 2014
19:30

Saudi Arabia	0–1	Iraq
	Report	Abdul-Raheem 33'

Seeb Stadium, Seeb
Attendance: 4,700
Referee: Mohammed Abdulla (United Arab Emirates)

== Winners ==
2013 AFC U-22 Championship

Iraq
1st title

== Statistics ==
=== Goalscorers ===
5 goals

- (Iran) Kaveh Rezaei

4 goals

- (Iraq) Marwan Hussein
- (Jordan) Hamza Al-Dardour

3 goals

- (Japan) Shōya Nakajima
- (Saudi Arabia) Abdulfattah Asiri

2 goals

- (Australia) Peter Skapetis
- (Iraq) Mustafa Nadhim
- (North Korea) Jo Kwang
- (South Korea) Baek Sung-dong
- (South Korea) Yun Il-lok
- (Oman) Hatem Al-Hamhami
- (Syria) Nasouh Nakdali
- (Saudi Arabia) Abdullah Al-Ammar
- (Saudi Arabia) Mohammed Majrashi

1 goal

- (Australia) Ryan Kitto
- (China) Luo Senwen
- (China) Yang Chaosheng
- (Iran) Behnam Barzay
- (Iraq) Mohannad Abdul-Raheem
- (Iraq) Dhurgham Ismail
- (Iraq) Amjad Kalaf
- (Japan) Takuma Asano
- (Japan) Riki Harakawa
- (Japan) Shinya Yajima
- (Jordan) Ibrahim Daldoum
- (Jordan) Odai Khadr
- (Jordan) Bilal Qwaider
- (Jordan) Ahmed Samir
- (Jordan) Mahmoud Za'tara
- (North Korea) Pak Kwang-ryong
- (South Korea) Hwang Ui-jo
- (South Korea) Kim Kyung-jung
- (South Korea) Lim Chang-woo
- (South Korea) Moon Chang-jin
- (Kuwait) Faisal Edhms Alenezi
- (Myanmar) Maung Maung Soe
- (Oman) Sami Al Hasani
- (Oman) Raed Saleh
- (Saudi Arabia) Zakaria Sami
- (Saudi Arabia) Motaz Hawsawi
- (Syria) Mardik Mardikian
- (Syria) Hamid Mido
- (United Arab Emirates) Yousif Saeed
- (United Arab Emirates) Salim Khalfan Saif
- (Uzbekistan) Jamshid Iskanderov
- (Uzbekistan) Egor Krimets
- (Uzbekistan) Igor Sergeev
- (Yemen) Sadam Hussein

1 own goal

- (Australia) Corey Brown (playing against Japan)
- (South Korea) Lim Chang-woo (playing against Jordan)

=== Tournament team rankings ===
As per statistical convention in football, matches decided in extra time are counted as wins and losses, while matches decided by penalty shoot-outs are counted as draws.

Pos	Team	Pld	W	D	L	GF	GA	GD	Pts	Final result
1	Iraq	6	6	0	0	9	2	+7	18	Champions
2	Saudi Arabia	6	4	0	2	9	7	+2	12	Runners-up
3	Jordan	6	3	2	1	10	5	+5	11	Third place
4	South Korea	6	3	2	1	8	3	+5	11	Fourth place
5	Syria	4	2	1	1	4	3	+1	7	Eliminated in quarter-finals
6	Australia	4	2	0	2	3	6	−3	6	Eliminated in quarter-finals
7	Japan	4	1	2	1	7	4	+3	5	Eliminated in quarter-finals
8	United Arab Emirates	4	1	2	1	2	2	0	5	Eliminated in quarter-finals
9	Iran	3	1	1	1	6	5	+1	4	Eliminated in group stage
10	North Korea	3	1	1	1	3	2	+1	4	Eliminated in group stage
11	Oman (H)	3	1	0	2	4	3	+1	3	Eliminated in group stage
12	Uzbekistan	3	1	0	2	3	4	−1	3	Eliminated in group stage
13	Kuwait	3	0	1	2	1	4	−3	1	Eliminated in group stage
14	China	3	0	0	3	2	5	−3	0	Eliminated in group stage
15	Yemen	3	0	0	3	1	5	−4	0	Eliminated in group stage
16	Myanmar	3	0	0	3	1	13	−12	0	Eliminated in group stage

Source: AFC
(H) Hosts

== Awards ==
The following awards were presented.

Top Goalscorer	Most Valuable Player	Fair Play Award
(Iran) Kaveh Rezaei	(Iraq) Amjad Kalaf	South Korea
