= 2018 AFC U-23 Championship final =

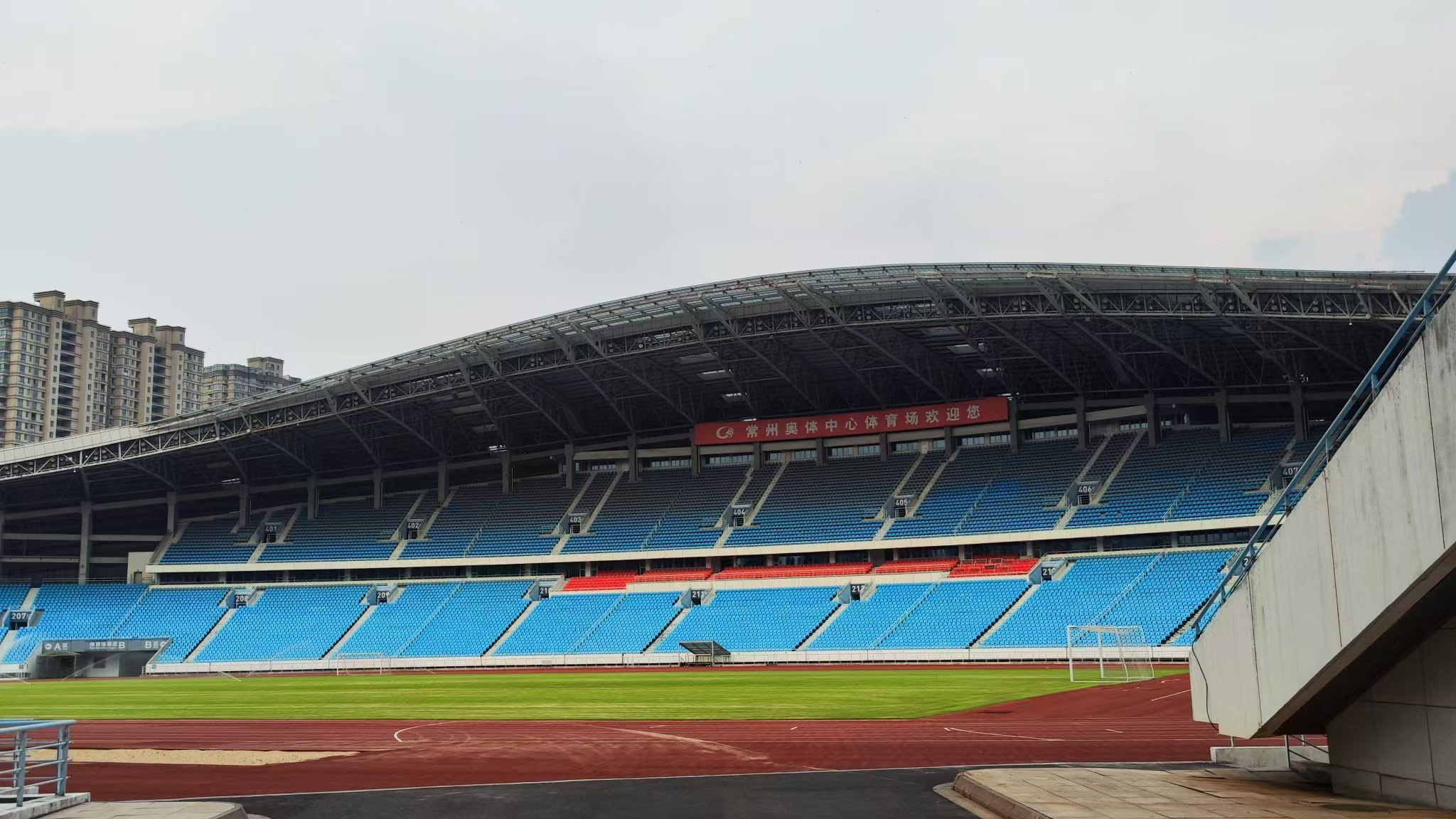
- Changzhou Olympic Sports Centre in Changzhou hosted the final.
- Event: 2018 AFC U-23 Championship
Vietnam	Uzbekistan
(Vietnam)	(Uzbekistan)
1	2
- After extra time
- Date: 27 January 2018
- Venue: Changzhou Olympic Sports Centre, Changzhou
- Man of the Match: Nguyễn Quang Hải
- Referee: Ahmed Al-Kaf (Oman)
- Attendance: 6,200
- Weather: Heavy snow 0 °C (32 °F)

The 2018 AFC U-23 Championship final was a football match that took place on 27 January 2018 at the Changzhou Olympic Sports Centre in Changzhou, China, to determine the winners of the 2018 AFC U-23 Championship. The match was contested by Vietnam and Uzbekistan, the winners of the semi-finals.

Uzbekistan beat Vietnam after extra time to claim their maiden U-23 Asian Cup title. The match was described by the AFC as one of the most exciting and memorable finals in history of the Asian Football Confederation (AFC).

Despite being a defeat, the match was widely recognized as one of the most memorable matches in Vietnamese football history, popularly known as the "White-snow Changzhou" (Thường Châu tuyết trắng) match. Nguyễn Quang Hải's goal, dubbed "the Rainbow in the snow" (Cầu vồng tuyết), was also honored as one of the most iconic moments of Vietnamese football as well as of the entire tournament.

== Route to the final ==
Vietnam's participation to the final was considered as a surprise. Prior to the tournament, Vietnam had just participated in one edition, the 2016 AFC U-23 Championship where they finished bottom with total three defeats. Uzbekistan, being considered as a heavyweight, in their first two editions were not successful, being eliminated from the group stage both two editions and only claimed one victory in both tournaments.

Vietnam participated in the tournament together with South Korea, Australia and Syria. Being in a tough group, Vietnam was believed to make an early exit from the group stage. That was true in the first match, when Vietnam lost 1–2 to South Korea. However, Vietnam surprisingly bounced back and beat Australia 1–0, took vengeance for the defeat two years ago. After drawing Syria 0–0, Vietnam, together with Malaysia were the first two Southeast Asian teams to qualify into the knockout stage. Vietnam continued to surprise every predictions by defeating Iraq and Qatar on the penalty shootout after two thrillers, both ended 3–3 and 2–2 after 120 minutes each. Thus Vietnam had written history by becoming the first Southeast Asian team since 1999, to play in the final of an AFC tournament. This was also Vietnam's first ever AFC final in their football history.

Uzbekistan was placed in group A with host China, Qatar and Oman. Unlike Vietnam, Uzbekistan had more experience, and was expected to make at least the semi-finals. However, their hope was shattered by a humiliating 0–1 loss to Qatar, before they fought back and defeated China and Oman both with the score 1–0. When the Young White Wolves passed into the quarter-finals, the Uzbeks showed their strength by demolishing an Olympic-preparing squad and Asian champions Japan in a surprising 4–0 victory, before taking 120 minutes to defeat another East Asian giant, South Korea, 4–1.

Vietnam
Round
Uzbekistan
Opponents
Result
Group stage
Opponents
Result
South Korea
1–2
Match 1
Qatar
0–1
Australia
1–0
Match 2
China
1–0
Syria
0–0
Match 3
Oman
1–0
Group D runners-up

Pos	Team	Pld	Pts
1	South Korea	3	7
2	Vietnam	3	4
3	Australia	3	3
4	Syria	3	2

Source: AFC
Final standings
Group A runners-up

Pos	Team	Pld	Pts
1	Qatar	3	9
2	Uzbekistan	3	6
3	China	3	3
4	Oman	3	0

Source: AFC
Opponents
Result
Knockout stage
Opponents
Result
Iraq
3–3 (a.e.t.) (5–3 p)
Quarter-finals
Japan
4–0
Qatar
2–2 (a.e.t.) (4–3 p)
Semi-finals
South Korea
4–1 (a.e.t.)

== Match ==
In decidedly snowy conditions at the Changzhou Olympic Sports Center, it was Uzbekistan who controlled the early proceedings, and they duly took the lead on eight minutes when a poorly marked Rustamjon Ashurmatov headed home Khamdamov’s outswinging corner.

Uzbekistan continued to press after the breakthrough, as both a Javokhir Sidikov header and Khamdamov’s effort from 20 yards forced Vietnam goalkeeper Bui Tien Dung into quick saves.

Despite struggling to fully impose themselves on the game, Vietnam briefly threatened to restore parity shortly after the half hour mark when Pham Xuan Manh’s excellent cross narrowly eluded the onrushing Phan Van Duc and Nguyen Quang Hai.

However, after seeing Azizjon Ganiev fire narrowly over, Vietnam drew level on the stroke of half-time. Nguyen Cong Phuong was brought down on the edge of the area and from the resulting free-kick, Quang Hai superbly curled the ball past the despairing dive of Botirali Ergashev to register his fifth goal of the tournament.

After a delayed restart to allow a layer of snow to be removed from the pitch, Uzbekistan were the first to shine once again, this time Khamdamov stinging the palms of Tien Dung courtesy of a 48th minute long-range drive.

Moments later, Tien Dung, the hero of Vietnam’s semi-final win over Iraq, reacted well to deny Sidikov from six yards, before Uzbekistan captain Zabikhillo Urinboev fizzed a shot wide of the left-hand upright on 70 minutes.

In the last action of normal time, Urinboev could, and very possibly should, have won the match for the Central Asians, but the striker inexplicably lashed his attempt from eight yards over the bar after Tien Dung had parried Akramjon Komilov’s cross into his path.

Urinboev’s miss was to matter little in the end though, as Sidorov applied an expert finish to Khamdamov's last gasp corner at the end of additional time to seal the title for Uzbekistan and break Vietnamese hearts on a day of high drama.

27 January 2018
16:00 (UTC+8)
Final

Vietnam	1–2 (a.e.t.)	Uzbekistan
Nguyễn Quang Hải 41'	Report	Ashurmatov 8'; Sidorov 120'

Changzhou Olympic Sports Centre, Changzhou
Attendance: 6,200
Referee: Ahmed Al-Kaf (Oman)

Vietnam	Uzbekistan (first half)	Uzbekistan (second half and extra time)

GK	1	Bùi Tiến Dũng I
CB	11	Đỗ Duy Mạnh	(yellow card) 111'
CB	21	Trần Đình Trọng
CB	4	Bùi Tiến Dũng II
RM	2	Phạm Xuân Mạnh
CM	6	Lương Xuân Trường (c)
CM	8	Phạm Đức Huy		(substituted off) 58'
LM	17	Vũ Văn Thanh
RF	19	Nguyễn Quang Hải
CF	10	Nguyễn Công Phượng		(substituted off) 80'
LF	14	Phan Văn Đức		(substituted off) 109'
Substitutions:
DF	20	Bùi Tiến Dụng	(yellow card) 101'	(substituted on) 80'
MF	7	Nguyễn Phong Hồng Duy		(substituted on) 109'
FW	13	Hà Đức Chinh		(substituted on) 58'
Manager:
(South Korea) Park Hang-seo

GK	1	Botirali Ergashev
RB	5	Abbosjon Otakhonov		(substituted off) 103'
CB	20	Dostonbek Tursunov	(yellow card) 111'
CB	2	Rustamjon Ashurmatov
LB	4	Akramjon Komilov
CM	6	Azizjon Ganiev
CM	7	Odiljon Hamrobekov	(yellow card) 35'
RW	8	Jasurbek Yakhshiboev	(yellow card) 10'	(substituted off) 45'
AM	10	Javokhir Sidikov	(yellow card) 121'	(substituted off) 118'
LW	17	Dostonbek Khamdamov
CF	9	Zabikhillo Urinboev (c)
Substitutions:
MF	16	Doniyorjon Narzullaev		(substituted on) 45'
FW	22	Bobur Abdikholikov		(substituted on) 103'
FW	11	Andrey Sidorov		(substituted on) 118'
Manager:
Ravshan Khaydarov

Match rules:

- 90 minutes.
- 30 minutes of extra time if necessary.
- Penalty shoot-out if scores still level.
- Maximum of three substitutions.

== Controversies ==
=== Referee issues ===
Prior to the final, the AFC had assigned Chinese referee Ma Ning to be in the final. However, only a few hours before the match, Ma was replaced by Omani referee Ahmed Al-Kaf. The AFC did not explain their reasoning behind its decision, however, it was believed to have been from disputes between the host officials and the AFC over refereeing. Al-Kaf himself had also refereed in some previous AFC Champions League matches.

=== Snowy conditions ===
The match was played in heavy snow, under −2 °C, which was relatively very cold, and it had been suggested that the match be delayed due to snowfall. However, the AFC turned down the request and ordered the match to continue. After the end of the first half, the AFC asked that the snow be cleared from the field, and it took around thirty minutes to one hour until the match could be continued. It was criticised in the aftermath of the match, both by Uzbek and Vietnamese fans, as both teams were not accustomed to play in such harsh weather conditions.

Screenshot of the game's pre-match ceremony, with the snowy field and the Uzbek side sporting the all-white jersey.

=== Uzbekistan's team shirt ===
In the first half, the Uzbeks were permitted by the AFC to wear all-white, despite heavy snow storms across the city. Because of this, not only the Vietnamese, but even the Uzbek players found themselves very hard to find and see their own players on the field. To solve the problem, the Uzbeks had changed to blue shirts in the second half of the match.
