= Al-Ghassani =

Al-Ghassani is a surname. Notable people with the surname include:

- Yahya ibn Yahya al-Ghassani (684–750s), Umayyad governor of Mosul
- Qays al-Ghassani (9th century), Arab Orthodox martyr
- Abul Qasim ibn Mohammed al-Ghassani (1548–1610), Moroccan physician
- Mohammed ibn Abd al-Wahab al-Ghassani (died 1707), Moroccan ambassador to Spain
- Mohammed Al-Ghassani (born 1985) Omani footballer
- Abdul Rahman Al-Ghassani (born 1990), Omani footballer
- Yahya Al-Ghassani (born 1998), Emirati footballer
- Muhsen Al-Ghassani (born 1997), Omani footballer
