= 2022 WAFF U-23 Championship squads =

WAFF Championship tournament

The 2022 WAFF U-23 Championship was an international football tournament held in Saudi Arabia from 3 to 15 November 2022. It was the third edition of the U-23 age group competition organised by the West Asian Football Federation.

The six national teams involved in the tournament were required to register a squad of at most 23 players, including three goalkeepers. Only players in these squads were eligible to take part in the tournament. Players born on or after 1 January 1999 were eligible to compete in the tournament.

The full squad listings are below. The age listed for each player is on 3 November 2022, the first day of the tournament. The nationality for each club reflects the national association (not the league) to which the club is affiliated. A flag is included for coaches who are of a different nationality than their own national team. Players in boldface were capped at full international level prior to being called up.

== Group A ==
=== Lebanon ===
Coach: Youssef Al-Jawhari

The squad was announced on 31 October 2022.

No.	Pos.	Player	Date of birth (age)	Club
1	GK	Hadi Kanj	14 September 2001 (aged 21)	(Lebanese Football Association) Ansar
2	DF	Ali Alrida Ismail	8 July 2003 (aged 19)	(Lebanese Football Association) Nejmeh
3	DF	Abdul Razzak Dakramanji	22 February 2001 (aged 21)	(Lebanese Football Association) Tripoli
4	DF	Mohamad Baker El Housseini	18 December 2002 (aged 19)	(Lebanese Football Association) Safa
5	MF	Jawad Koutharani	17 August 2002 (aged 20)	(Lebanese Football Association) Tadamon Sour
6	MF	Mohamad Haidar	2 January 2001 (aged 21)	(Lebanese Football Association) Shabab Sahel
7	FW	Mohamad Omar Sadek	25 October 2003 (aged 19)	(Lebanese Football Association) Bourj
8	MF	Hasan Srour	18 December 2001 (aged 20)	(Lebanese Football Association) Ahed
9	FW	Mohammad Nasser	16 October 2001 (aged 21)	(Lebanese Football Association) Ahed
10	FW	Ali Al Haj	2 February 2001 (aged 21)	(Lebanese Football Association) Ahed
11	FW	Karim Mekkaoui	19 April 2001 (aged 21)	(Cyprus Football Association) Ayia Napa
12	FW	Hasan Hawila	13 January 2002 (aged 20)	(Lebanese Football Association) Safa
13	DF	Maxime Aoun	4 March 2001 (aged 21)	(Lebanese Football Association) Ansar
14	FW	Said Saad	21 May 2002 (aged 20)	(Lebanese Football Association) Akhaa Ahli Aley
15	MF	Ali Chaito		(Lebanese Football Association) Bourj
16	DF	Hassan Kaafarani	17 December 2001 (aged 20)	(Lebanese Football Association) Tadamon Sour
17	FW	Mohammad Al Massri	22 June 2001 (aged 21)	(Lebanese Football Association) Akhaa Ahli Aley
18	DF	Ali Hussein Al Moussa	3 August 2001 (aged 21)	(Lebanese Football Association) Shabab Sahel
19	DF	Mohamad Al Mahdi Al Moussawi	3 October 2003 (aged 19)	(Lebanese Football Association) Akhaa Ahli Aley
20	DF	Alex Rattel		(Lebanese Football Association) Tripoli
21	GK	Rabih Salha	11 April 2002 (aged 20)	(Lebanese Football Association) Akhaa Ahli Aley
22	MF	Said Al Ali		(Lebanese Football Association) Tripoli
23	GK	Hadi Saad	21 July 2001 (aged 21)	(Lebanese Football Association) Shabab Sahel

=== Oman ===
Coach: Akram Habrish

The squad was announced on 28 October 2022.

No.	Pos.	Player	Date of birth (age)	Club
1	GK	Maitham Al Ajmi		(Oman Football Association) Al-Ittihad
2	DF	Moather Al Khalili		(Oman Football Association) Fanja
3	DF	Al Yaqdhan Al Mushairafi		(Oman Football Association) Al-Seeb
4	DF	Basel Al Jaberi		(Oman Football Association) Oman
5	DF	Khaled Al Ghatrafi		(Oman Football Association) Fanja
6	MF	Saeed Al Salami		(Oman Football Association) Al-Khaburah
7	FW	Nasser Al Rawahi	26 June 2001 (aged 21)	(Oman Football Association) Al-Suwaiq
8	MF	Tarek Al Mashaari		(Oman Football Association) Oman
9	FW	Abdullah Al Mashrafi		(Oman Football Association) Dhofar
10	MF	Hussain Al Shahri		(Oman Football Association) Dhofar
11	MF	Omar Al Salti	17 February 2002 (aged 20)	(Oman Football Association) Al-Orouba
12	GK	Mutee Al Saadi		(Oman Football Association) Al-Suwaiq
13	DF	Mohammed Al Tarshi	11 November 2001 (aged 20)	(Oman Football Association) Al-Shabab
14	MF	Salem Al Abdulsalam		(Oman Football Association) Saham
15	DF	Fahad Al Rasbi	16 March 2002 (aged 20)	(Oman Football Association) Al-Ittihad
16	FW	Al Faraj Al Kiyomi		(Oman Football Association) Al-Bashaer
17	DF	Muntasar Al Zadjali		(Oman Football Association) Al-Rustaq
18	MF	Mohammed Al Hinai		(Oman Football Association) Al-Nahda
19	DF	Abdullah Al Habsi		(Oman Football Association) Al-Seeb
20	FW	Musab Al Lamki		(Oman Football Association) Al-Mussanah
21	DF	Abdulhafith Al Mukhaini		(Oman Football Association) Al-Orouba
22	GK	Khaled Al Abadi		(Oman Football Association) Saham
23	MF	Mulham Al Sunaidi		(Oman Football Association) Muscat

=== Qatar ===
Coach: (Portugal) Bruno Pinheiro

The squad was announced on 16 October 2022.

No.	Pos.	Player	Date of birth (age)	Club
1	GK	Yousef Baliadeh	30 October 2002 (aged 20)	(Qatar Football Association) Al-Sadd
2	DF	Abdalla Sirelkhatem	30 October 2002 (aged 20)	(Qatar Football Association) Al-Gharafa
3	DF	Diyab Taha	15 May 2001 (aged 21)	(Qatar Football Association) Al-Duhail
4	DF	Mohammed Aiash	27 February 2001 (aged 21)	(Qatar Football Association) Al-Duhail
5	DF	Mostafa Qadeera	20 December 2001 (aged 20)	(Qatar Football Association) Al-Gharafa
6	MF	Osamah Al-Tairi	16 June 2002 (aged 20)	(Qatar Football Association) Al-Rayyan
7	FW	Hadi Tabasideh	14 September 2001 (aged 21)	(Qatar Football Association) Al-Sailiya
8	MF	Nabil Irfan	7 February 2004 (aged 18)	(Qatar Football Association) Al-Wakrah
9	FW	Mekki Tombari	15 February 2001 (aged 21)	(Qatar Football Association) Al-Rayyan
10	MF	Khalid Ali Sabah	5 October 2001 (aged 21)	(Qatar Football Association) Al-Rayyan
11	MF	Abdulla Al-Yazidi	28 March 2002 (aged 20)	(Qatar Football Association) Al-Sadd
12	MF	Mohammed Zidan	2 June 2001 (aged 21)	(Qatar Football Association) Al-Kharaitiyat
13	DF	Abdulla Al-Ali	14 November 2001 (aged 20)	(Qatar Football Association) Al-Rayyan
14	MF	**Tameem Al-Abdullah**	5 October 2002 (aged 20)	(Qatar Football Association) Al-Rayyan
15	MF	Ali Al-Yazidi	28 August 2000 (aged 22)	(Qatar Football Association) Umm Salal
16	MF	Faisal Azadi	13 January 2001 (aged 21)	(Qatar Football Association) Al-Sadd
17	FW	Lotfi Madjer	22 March 2002 (aged 20)	(Qatar Football Association) Al-Duhail
18	MF	Mohammed Al-Ishaq	17 December 2004 (aged 17)	(Qatar Football Association) Al-Ahli
19	MF	Ahmed Al-Saeed	31 October 2003 (aged 19)	(Qatar Football Association) Al-Sadd
20	MF	Abdulrahman Al-Jassem	31 August 2002 (aged 20)	(Qatar Football Association) Qatar
21	GK	Karim Haider	7 April 2004 (aged 18)	(Qatar Football Association) Al-Sadd
22	GK	Abdulla Ibrahim	22 February 2003 (aged 19)	(Qatar Football Association) Al-Sadd
23	DF	Saifeldeen Fadlalla	31 March 2003 (aged 19)	(Qatar Football Association) Al-Gharafa

== Group B ==
=== Bahrain ===
Coach: (Croatia) Dario Bašić

The squad was announced on 31 October 2022.

No.	Pos.	Player	Date of birth (age)	Club
1	GK	Hassan Taha		(Bahrain Football Association) Al-Malkiya
2	DF	Abdulla Al-Khalasi	2 September 2003 (aged 19)	(Bahrain Football Association) Al-Muharraq
3	FW	Vincent Emmanuel		(Bahrain Football Association) Sitra
4	DF	Salem Husain		(Bahrain Football Association) Al-Shabab
5	MF	Ahmed Rabeah		(Bahrain Football Association) Al-Muharraq
6	MF	Hussain Al-Ekri		(Bahrain Football Association) Al-Shabab
7	MF	Ali Humood		(Bahrain Football Association) Al-Najma
8	MF	Ali Kamel		(Bahrain Football Association) Al-Najma
9	FW	Husain Abdulkarim		(Bahrain Football Association) Isa Town
10	MF	Ammar Mirza		(Bahrain Football Association) Al-Ittihad
11	MF	Sayed Jawad Haidar	7 January 2002 (aged 20)	(Bahrain Football Association) Al-Shabab
12	DF	Ahmed Abdulhameed		(Bahrain Football Association) Sitra
13	DF	Khalifa Al-Lafi	26 December 2001 (aged 20)	(Bahrain Football Association) Al-Manama
14	DF	Mohammed Abdul Qayoom	4 June 2001 (aged 21)	(Bahrain Football Association) Al-Riffa
15	DF	Ahmed Kamil		(Bahrain Football Association) Al-Hala
16	MF	Hassan Abdulnabi		(Bahrain Football Association) Al-Shabab
17	MF	Mostafa Al-Salem		(Bahrain Football Association) Al-Manama
18	FW	Saleh Al-Zubaidi		(Bahrain Football Association) Al-Muharraq
19	MF	Bashir Fouad		(Bahrain Football Association) Al-Budaiya
20	MF	Ali Mohammed Redha		(Bahrain Football Association) Al-Shabab
21	GK	Abdullah Fraih	1 April 2003 (aged 19)	(Bahrain Football Association) Al-Riffa
22	GK	Abdulrahman Al-Kohaji		(Bahrain Football Association) Al-Hala
23	FW	Adel Al-Romaihi	31 August 2001 (aged 21)	(Bahrain Football Association) Al-Najma

=== Saudi Arabia ===
Coach: Saad Al-Shehri

The squad was announced on 1 November 2022.

No.	Pos.	Player	Date of birth (age)	Club
1	GK	Abdulrahman Al-Sanbi	3 February 2001 (aged 21)	(Saudi Arabian Football Federation) Al-Ahli
2	DF	Nawaf Al-Mutairi	7 March 2001 (aged 21)	(Saudi Arabian Football Federation) Al-Orobah
3	DF	Hamad Al-Sayyaf	18 January 2002 (aged 20)	(Saudi Arabian Football Federation) Al-Ettifaq
4	DF	Rayane Hamidou	13 April 2002 (aged 20)	(Saudi Arabian Football Federation) Al-Ahli
5	DF	Mohammed Issa	2 April 2002 (aged 20)	(Saudi Arabian Football Federation) Al-Shabab
6	MF	**Naif Masoud**	8 March 2001 (aged 21)	(Saudi Arabian Football Federation) Al-Qadsiah
7	MF	Ziyad Al-Johani	11 November 2001 (aged 20)	(Saudi Arabian Football Federation) Al-Ahli
8	MF	**Faisal Al-Ghamdi**	13 August 2001 (aged 21)	(Saudi Arabian Football Federation) Al-Ettifaq
9	FW	Turki Al-Mutairi	31 May 2001 (aged 21)	(Saudi Arabian Football Federation) Al-Taawoun
10	MF	**Saad Al-Nasser**	8 January 2001 (aged 21)	(Saudi Arabian Football Federation) Al-Taawoun
11	MF	**Ahmed Al-Ghamdi**	20 September 2001 (aged 21)	(Saudi Arabian Football Federation) Al-Ettifaq
12	MF	**Mohammed Abu Al-Shamat**	11 August 2002 (aged 20)	(Saudi Arabian Football Federation) Al-Qadsiah
13	DF	**Hussain Al-Sibyani**	24 June 2001 (aged 21)	(Saudi Arabian Football Federation) Al-Shabab
14	MF	**Awad Al-Nashri**	15 March 2002 (aged 20)	(Saudi Arabian Football Federation) Al-Ittihad
15	MF	**Mohammed Al-Qahtani**	23 July 2002 (aged 20)	(Saudi Arabian Football Federation) Al-Hilal
16	FW	**Mohammed Maran**	15 February 2001 (aged 21)	(Saudi Arabian Football Federation) Al-Nassr
17	FW	Rayan Al-Bloushi	27 February 2001 (aged 21)	(Saudi Arabian Football Federation) Al-Ettifaq
18	DF	Bandar Darwish	4 October 2001 (aged 21)	(Hellenic Football Federation) PAOK B
19	DF	**Meshal Al-Sebyani**	11 April 2001 (aged 21)	(Saudi Arabian Football Federation) Al-Faisaly
20	MF	Khalil Al-Absi	28 May 2001 (aged 21)	(Saudi Arabian Football Federation) Al-Tai
21	GK	Mohammed Al-Absi	24 September 2002 (aged 20)	(Saudi Arabian Football Federation) Al-Shabab
22	GK	Raed Ozaybi	22 September 2001 (aged 21)	(Saudi Arabian Football Federation) Al-Faisaly
23	MF	**Musab Al-Juwayr**	20 June 2003 (aged 19)	(Saudi Arabian Football Federation) Al-Hilal

=== Syria ===
Coach: (Netherlands) Mark Wotte

The squad was announced on 25 October 2022.

No.	Pos.	Player	Date of birth (age)	Club
1	GK	Waseem Ayoub		(Syrian Football Association) Al-Majd
2	DF	Jihad Ghawi		(Syrian Football Association) Al-Hurriya
3	DF	Omar Mohamed		(Syrian Football Association) Al-Shorta
4	DF	Mostafa Safrani	1 January 2001 (aged 21)	(Syrian Football Association) Al-Nawair
5	MF	Amer Fayad		(Syrian Football Association) Al-Ittihad
6	MF	Ahmad Dali	21 March 2002 (aged 20)	(Syrian Football Association) Tishreen
7	MF	Fawaz Bawadekji		(Syrian Football Association) Al-Ittihad
8	MF	Mohamed Nour El Din Khamis		(Syrian Football Association) Al-Taliya
9	FW	Abdulrahman Al Hussain		(Syrian Football Association) Al-Fotuwa
10	MF	**Mohamad Rihanieh**	26 December 2001 (aged 20)	(Syrian Football Association) Al-Ittihad
11	MF	Omar Nanoua		(Syrian Football Association) Jableh
12	DF	Ali Al Rina		(Syrian Football Association) Al-Ittihad
13	DF	Khaled Al Hejjeh		(Syrian Football Association) Hutteen
14	DF	Al Mekdad Ahmad	12 January 2004 (aged 18)	(Syrian Football Association) Jableh
15	DF	Haitham Al Louz	1 January 2001 (aged 21)	(Syrian Football Association) Al-Karamah
16	MF	Malek Janeer		(Syrian Football Association) Al-Fotuwa
17	FW	Zakaria Ramadan		(Syrian Football Association) Al-Ittihad
18	MF	Hozan Osman	16 May 2003 (aged 19)	(Royal Dutch Football Association) De Graafschap
19	MF	Mahmoud Nayef	3 January 2004 (aged 18)	(Syrian Football Association) Al-Ittihad
20	FW	**Oliver Kass Kawo**	3 December 2001 (aged 20)	(Danish Football Association) Helsingør
21	FW	Mahmoud Al Aswad		(Syrian Football Association) Al-Karamah
22	GK	Mohamed Yamen Motlak	1 January 2003 (aged 19)	(Syrian Football Association) Al-Jaish
23	GK	Mohamed Hassouni	7 January 2004 (aged 18)	(Syrian Football Association) Al-Ittihad
