= Saad Al-Shehri =

Saudi footballer and manager

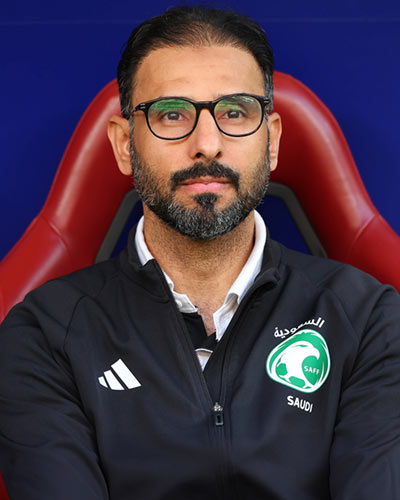

Personal information
- Full name: Saad Ali Al-Shehri
- Date of birth: 9 January 1980 (age 46)
- Place of birth: Dammam, Saudi Arabia
- Position: Midfielder

Youth career
- Al-Ettifaq

Senior career*
| Years | Team | Apps | (Gls) |
| 1998–2000 | Al-Ettifaq | | |
| 2000–2004 | Al-Nassr | | |
| 2006–2007 | Al-Qadsiah | | |
| 2007–2008 | Al-Jubail | | |
| 2008 | Al-Thoqbah | | |

International career
| 1998–1999 | Saudi Arabia U20 | | |

Managerial career
- 2008–2009: Eastern Region Education
- 2015–2017: Saudi Arabia U20
- 2017: Al-Nahda
- 2017–2018: Al-Ettifaq
- 2018–2024: Saudi Arabia U23
- 2023: Saudi Arabia (interim)
- 2025–2026: Al-Ettifaq
Medal record
Men's football
Representing Saudi Arabia (as manager)
AFC U-19 Championship
| Runner-up | 2016 |
AFC U-23 Championship
| Runner-up | 2020 |
| Winner | 2022 |
- * Club domestic league appearances and goals

Saad Ali Al-Shehri (Arabic: سَعْد عَلِيّ الشَّهْرِيّ; born 9 January 1980) is a Saudi Arabian professional football manager and former player.

== Professional career ==
He formerly played for Al-Ettifaq, Al-Nassr, Al-Qadsiah, Al-Jubail, and Al-Thoqbah. He was a member of the Saudi Arabia U20 national team in the 1999 FIFA World Youth Championship in Nigeria.

== Managerial career ==
Saad Al-Shehri began his managerial career with the Eastern Region Education Team in 2008. The team consisted of many players who would go on and become Saudi internationals including Yasser Al-Shahrani, Abdullah Al-Hafith, Ibrahim Al-Ibrahim, Ali Al-Zubaidi and Mohammed Al-Fatil. Al-Shehri won Schools Football League with Eastern Region Education Team, and he received praise from former Saudi national team manager Khalil Al-Zayani. In 2010, Al-Shehri signed a contract to manage Al-Qadsiah's U17 team. With Al-Qadsiah, Al-Shehri achieved promotion from the Regional League to the U17 Premier League. The following season under Al-Shehri's supervision, Al-Qadsiah managed to avoid relegation and remain in the U17 Premier League. In the 2011–12 season, Al-Qadsiah won the U19 Premier League with Al-Shehri as manager. Al-Shehri then moved on to work as an assistant manager for Saudi Arabia U20 and won the U17 GCC Championship.

On May 28, 2013, Al-Shehri was appointed as the manager of Al-Nassr's U19 team. He led Al-Nassr to the U19 Premier League championship in the 2014–2015 season. Following the expiry of his contract with the U20 national team, Al-Shehri signed with Al-Nahda on June 16, 2017. However, the contract was canceled for administrative reasons on July 13, 2017. On July 15, 2017, Al-Shehri signed a contract to manage Al-Ettifaq's U23 team.

=== Saudi Arabia U20 ===
On June 28, 2015, Al-Shehri was appointed as the Saudi Arabia U20 national team manager. Al-Shehri led the U20 national team to the final of the 2016 AFC U-19 Championship where they lost to Japan on penalties. He also led the young falcons to the Round of 16 of the 2017 FIFA U-20 World Cup which equalized their best performance.

=== Al-Ettifaq ===
Following the dismissal of first-team coach, Miodrag Ješić, on 10 December 2017, Al-Shehri was appointed as manager until the end of the season. Al-Ettifaq were second bottom at the time of his appointment with just 12 points in 12 matches. In his first match in charge, Al-Ettifaq were defeated by Al-Ahli 4–1. In Al-Shehri's second match with Al-Ettifaq, they defeated third-placed Al-Nassr 3–2 at home. Al-Ettifaq then defeated Al-Tai 6–0 to qualify to the Round of 16 of the King Cup. Al-Ettifaq then held first placed Al-Hilal to a 1–1 draw away from home before losing to Al-Shabab 3–1 away from home the following week. Al-Ettifaq were then defeated by Al-Ittihad 2–1 in the Round of 16 of the King Cup under controversial circumstances. After this game, Al-Ettifaq went undefeated for 8 games and saw them rise up to sixth place. During this run of form, Al-Ettifaq defeated first placed Al-Hilal and derby rivals Al-Qadsiah. Their unbeaten run ended on 6 April 2018, after losing to Al-Ittihad 4–2. In his final match in charge of Al-Ettifaq they defeated Al-Taawoun 3–2 to finish fourth, their best league performance since 2010–11.

=== Saudi Arabia U23 ===
On 15 March 2018, it was announced that Saad Al-Shehri would take charge of the Saudi Arabia U23 national team. He left Al-Ettifaq at the end of the season to become the full-time manager of the U23 national team. Al-Shehri's first tournament with the U23 national team was the 2018 Asian Games. In the opening match of the tournament, Saudi Arabia and Iran played out a goalless draw. Saudi Arabia then defeated Myanmar 3–0 before losing to North Korea in the final group stage match. Saudi Arabia qualified to the Round of 16 as one of the four best third-placed teams. On 24 August 2018, Saudi Arabia defeated China 4–3 to reach the Quarter-finals. Saudi Arabia were eventually eliminated in the quarter-finals by Japan.

Al-Shehri led the U23 national team to the 2020 AFC U-23 Championship after finishing among the best group runners-up during the qualification phase. In the opening group stage match, Saudi Arabia defeated Japan 2–1 thanks to a late penalty scored by Abdulrahman Ghareeb. The Saudis finished in first place after drawing Qatar and defeating Syria. In the quarter-finals, Saudi Arabia defeated hosts Thailand 1–0 to advance to the semi-finals. In the semi-finals they defeated reigning champions Uzbekistan to reach their second final and first since 2013. By reaching the final, Al-Shehri led the Saudi Arabia U23 national team to their first Olympics since 1996. In the final, Saudi Arabia were defeated by South Korea after extra time, thus Saad himself missed another chance to obtain a major trophy, having lost to Japan as manager of the Saudi Arabian U20 side before in the 2016 AFC U-19 Championship final . The Saudi Arabia U23 national team qualified to the 2020 Summer Olympics for the first time since the 1996 Summer Olympics and third overall as runners-up in the 2020 AFC U-23 Championship under the management of Saad Al-Shehri. The Saudis crashed out of the Olympics group stage without picking up a single point, losing against Ivory Coast, Germany and Brazil in the process.

Al-Shehri qualified for the 2022 AFC U-23 Asian Cup with many new fresh faces but also retained a few experienced players from the previous campaign. In the opening group stage match, Saudi Arabia defeated Tajikistan 5–0, they eventually finished Group D in first place after a 0-0 draw against Japan and a 2–0 win over the United Arab Emirates. In the quarter-finals, Al-Shehri easily defeated Vietnam 2–0 to advance to the semi-finals. In the semi-finals, Saudi Arabia defeated Australia 2–0 to reach their second final in a row and third in total. In the final, Saudi Arabia faced the hosts Uzbekistan, on their home soil with over 30,000 Uzbek fans in attendance. The match was highly contested until Ahmed Al-Ghamdi broke the deadlock in the 48' minute with a shot at the edge of the box which flew past the goalkeeper into the top corner. With just a quarter of an hour left, Turki Al-Ammar delivered a pass to Firas Al-Buraikan who fired a shot into the bottom corner to double the lead in the 74' minute. Despite Uzbekistan's desperate pushes for a goal in the final moments, the final whistle was blown and Saudi Arabia won their first AFC U-23 Asian Cup and Saad Al-Shehri finally won his first trophy with the Saudi National team(s).

On 15 November 2022, Al-Shehri managed to lead the U23 national team to another trophy after defeating Qatar 3–1 in the final of the 2022 WAFF U-23 Championship. This was Saudi Arabia's first title in the competition with Al-Shehri leading the Green Falcons to a second-place finish in the previous edition of the tournament.

=== Saudi Arabia ===
On 23 December 2022, it was announced that Al-Shehri would temporarily take charge of the senior national team during the 25th Arabian Gulf Cup. On 30 December 2022, Al-Shehri announced the 23-man squad taking part in the competition. In the Gulf Cup, fielding a team composed of the under-23 side and uncapped senior players, Saudi Arabia was eliminated from the group stage, achieving only a single win against Yemen.

Following Hervé Renard's resignation as coach of Saudi Arabia, Saad Al-Shehri was again named interim coach.

== Honours ==
=== Manager ===
Saudi Arabia U23

- AFC U-23 Asian Cup: 2022
- WAFF U-23 Championship: 2022

== Career statistics ==
=== Managerial statistics ===
As of match played 5 July 2026

Managerial record by team and tenure
| Team | From | To | Record | | | | |
| Team | From | To | P | W | D | L | Win % |
|---|---|---|---|---|---|---|---|
| Al-Ettifaq | 11 December 2017 | 13 April 2018 | 16 | 8 | 4 | 4 | 50.00 |
| Saudi Arabia U23 | 15 March 2018 | 31 December 2024 | 104 | 49 | 30 | 25 | 47.12 |
| Saudi Arabia (interim) | 1 January 2023 | 19 January 2023 | 3 | 1 | 0 | 2 | 33.33 |
| Al-Ettifaq | 30 January 2025 | 30 June 2026 | 56 | 23 | 14 | 19 | 41.07 |
| Total | | | 179 | 81 | 48 | 50 | 45.25 |
