= Ali Shaitou =

Lebanese footballer (born 2002)

Personal information
- Full name: Ali Ahmad Shaitou
- Date of birth: 5 October 2002 (age 24)
- Place of birth: Aabbassiyeh, Lebanon
- Position: Midfielder

Team information
- Current team: Tripoli

Youth career
- Islah Borj Shmali

Senior career*
Years	Team	Apps	(Gls)
2020–2021	Islah Borj Shmali		
2021–2024	Bourj	36	(1)
2024–2026	Nejmeh	23	(0)
2025–2026	→ Safa (loan)	16	(0)
2026–	Tripoli	0	(0)

International career^{‡}
2022–2023	Lebanon U23	6	(0)
2023	Lebanon	1	(0)
- * Club domestic league appearances and goals as of 3 July 2026 ‡ National team caps and goals as of 25 June 2023

Ali Ahmad Shaitou (Arabic: علي أحمد سعيتو; born 5 October 2002) is a Lebanese footballer who plays as a midfielder for Lebanese Premier League club Tripoli.

== Club career ==
Coming through the youth system, Shaitou played for Islah Borj Shmali in the 2020–21 Lebanese Second Division. He moved to Bourj in the Lebanese Premier League in August 2021, ahead of the 2021–22 season. In 2024 Shaitou joined Nejmeh, who sent him on a one-year loan to Safa in 2025. In August 2026, Shaitou joined Tripoli.

== International career ==
Shaitou played for the under-23 team in the 2021 and 2022 WAFF U-23 Championship tournaments. He was first called up to the senior team for the 2023 SAFF Championship in India, and made his debut on 25 June 2023, in a 4–1 win against Bhutan.

== Style of play ==
Shaitou is known for his long-range shots.

== Career statistics ==
=== International ===
As of match played 25 June 2023

Appearances and goals by national team and year
National team	Year	Apps	Goals
Lebanon	2023	1	0
Total		1	0
