= 2022 WAFF U-23 Championship =

بطولة غرب آسيا لكرة القدم تحت 23 عاما

Tournament details
- Host country: Saudi Arabia
- City: Jeddah
- Dates: 3–15 November
- Teams: 6 (from 1 confederation) (from 1 sub-confederation)
- Venues: 3 (in 1 host city)

Final positions
- Champions: Saudi Arabia (1st title)
- Runners-up: Qatar
- Third place: Syria
- Fourth place: Oman

Tournament statistics
- Matches played: 11
- Goals scored: 26 (2.36 per match)
- Top scorer(s): (Oman) Al Faraj Al Kiyumi (Oman) Nasser Al Rawahi (Saudi Arabia) Ahmed Al-Ghamdi (Saudi Arabia) Ziyad Al-Johani (Saudi Arabia) Mohammed Maran (Syria) Mohamad Rihanieh (2 goals each)
- Best player: (Saudi Arabia) Ahmed Al-Ghamdi
- Best goalkeeper: (Syria) Waseem Ayoub

The 2022 WAFF U-23 Championship was the third edition of the WAFF U-23 Championship the international age-restricted football championship organized by the West Asian Football Federation (WAFF) for the men's under-23 national teams of West Asia. A total of six teams competed in the tournament.

The tournament was originally going to be held in Iraq from 3 to 18 November 2022, but was relocated to Saudi Arabia due to the 2021–2022 Iraqi political crisis. Jordan, the defending champions, did not take part in the tournament. Saudi Arabia won their first title after defeating Qatar 3–1 in the final.

== Host selection ==
Originally, it was determined that Iraq would host the tournament, as a preparatory competition ahead of the 2023 AFC Asian Cup. However, due to the 2021–2022 Iraqi political crisis, the hosting rights were lifted based on the recommendation issued in this regard by the General Assembly and the Executive Committee of the WAFF during its two recent meetings that were held in the Jordanian capital Amman. On 23 September 2022, the WAFF announced that Saudi Arabia would host the tournament. Iraq would host the next edition instead.

== Teams ==
Nine teams initially confirmed their participation. On 13 October, both Iraq and Yemen withdrew from the competition. On 20 October, it was announced that Kuwait withdrew from the competition, bringing the final number of teams to six.

Team	Appearance	Previous best performance
Bahrain	3rd	Group stage (2015, 2021)
Lebanon	2nd	Group stage (2021)
Oman	3rd	Group stage (2015, 2021)
Qatar	2nd	Third place (2015)
Saudi Arabia	3rd	Runners-up (2021)
Syria	3rd	Runners-up (2015)

=== Draw ===
The draw was held on 20 October 2022.

=== Squads ===
Each team had to register a squad of 23 players, three of whom must be goalkeepers.

== Match officials ==
The following referees and assistant referees were appointed for the tournament.

Referees

- Mohamed Bunafoor (Bahrain)
- Osama Ahmad (Jordan)
- Ali Al Ashkar (Lebanon)
- Mohammed Al-Shammari (Qatar)
- Sami Al-Jires (Saudi Arabia)
- Mohammed Al Noori (Syria)
- Wissam Rabie (Syria)

Assistant Referees

- Abdulla Yaqoob (Bahrain)
- Amro Ajaj (Jordan)
- Sabreen Al Abadi (Jordan)
- Mohamad El Hajje (Lebanon)
- Mohammed Al Ghazali (Oman)
- Faisal Al-Shammari (Qatar)
- Faisal Al-Qahtani (Saudi Arabia)
- Oqbah Al Hweij (Syria)
- Roba Zarka (Syria)

== Venues ==
Jeddah	2022 WAFF U-23 Championship is located in Saudi Arabia	Jeddah	Jeddah
Sports Hall at King Abdullah Sports City	2022 WAFF U-23 Championship is located in Saudi Arabia	Prince Abdullah Al Faisal Stadium	King Abdullah Sports City
Capacity: 1,000	2022 WAFF U-23 Championship is located in Saudi Arabia	Capacity: 27,000	Capacity: 62,345

== Group stage ==
=== Group A ===
Pos	Team	Pld	W	D	L	GF	GA	GD	Pts	Qualification
1	Qatar	2	1	1	0	1	0	+1	4	Advance to knockout stage
2	Oman	2	1	0	1	4	3	+1	3	Advance to knockout stage
3	Lebanon	2	0	1	1	2	4	−2	1	

Source: WAFF
Rules for classification: Group stage tiebreakers
3 November 2022
17:00

Qatar	0–0	Lebanon
	Report

Sports Hall at King Abdullah Sports City, Jeddah
Attendance: 500
Referee: Mohamed Bunafoor (Bahrain)

6 November 2022
17:00

Lebanon	2–4	Oman
Sadek 72'; Saad 73'	Report	Al Kiyumi 10'; Al Abdulsalam 20'; Al Rawahi 40', 61'

Sports Hall at King Abdullah Sports City, Jeddah
Referee: Sami Al-Jires (Saudi Arabia)

9 November 2022
17:00

Oman	0–1	Qatar
	Report	Tombari 4'

Sports Hall at King Abdullah Sports City, Jeddah
Attendance: 100
Referee: Wissam Rabie (Syria)

=== Group B ===
Pos	Team	Pld	W	D	L	GF	GA	GD	Pts	Qualification
1	Saudi Arabia (H)	2	1	0	1	3	2	+1	3	Advance to knockout stage
2	Syria	2	1	0	1	3	3	0	3	Advance to knockout stage
3	Bahrain	2	1	0	1	2	3	−1	3	

Updated to match(es) played on 6 November 2022. Source: WAFF
Rules for classification: Group stage tiebreakers
(H) Hosts
3 November 2022
21:00

Bahrain	2–1	Syria
Abdulkarim 32'; Al-Romaihi 90+3'	Report	Rihanieh 90+2'

Sports Hall at King Abdullah Sports City, Jeddah
Attendance: 750
Referee: Ali Al Ashkar (Lebanon)

6 November 2022
21:00

Syria	2–1	Saudi Arabia
Al Aswad 25'; Rihanieh 44'	Report	Al-Johani 59'

Sports Hall at King Abdullah Sports City, Jeddah
Attendance: 900
Referee: Mohammed Al-Shammari (Qatar)

9 November 2022
21:00

Saudi Arabia	2–0	Bahrain
A. Al-Ghamdi 30'; Al-Johani 57'	Report

Sports Hall at King Abdullah Sports City, Jeddah
Attendance: 157
Referee: Mohammed Al Noori (Syria)

== Knockout stage ==
In the knockout stage, extra time and penalty shoot-out were to be used to decide the winner if necessary (Regulations Articles 10.1 and 10.3).

=== Bracket ===
Semi-finals
12 November – Jeddah (Al Faisal)
Qatar (p)	1 (6)
Syria	1 (5)
12 November – Jeddah (Al Faisal)
Saudi Arabia	2
Oman	1

Final
15 November – Jeddah (Al Jawhara)
Qatar	1
Saudi Arabia	3
Third place match
15 November – Jeddah (Al Jawhara)
Syria	1
Oman	0

=== Semi-finals ===
12 November 2022
17:00

Qatar	1–1	Syria
Qadeera 55'	Report	Bawadekji 53'
Penalties
Al-Tairi (penalty missed); Tabasideh (penalty scored); Azadi (penalty scored); Madjer (penalty scored); Taha (penalty scored); Al-Yazidi (penalty scored); Al-Jassem (penalty scored)	6–5	(penalty scored) Rihanieh; (penalty scored) Al Hussain; (penalty missed) Ahmad; (penalty scored) Kass Kawo; (penalty scored) Dali; (penalty scored) Al Louz; (penalty missed) Janeer

Prince Abdullah Al Faisal Stadium, Jeddah
Attendance: 1,231
Referee: Mohamed Bunafoor (Bahrain)

12 November 2022
21:00

Saudi Arabia	2–1	Oman
Maran 35', 53'	Report	Al Kiyumi 25'

Prince Abdullah Al Faisal Stadium, Jeddah
Attendance: 100
Referee: Osama Ahmad (Jordan)

=== Fifth place play-off ===
13 November 2022
17:00

Lebanon	0–1	Bahrain
	Report	Abdul Qayoom 81'

Prince Abdullah Al Faisal Stadium, Jeddah
Attendance: 120
Referee: Mohammed Al Noori (Syria)

=== Third place play-off ===
15 November 2022
17:00

Syria	1–0	Oman
Al Hejjeh 50'	Report

King Abdullah Sports City, Jeddah
Attendance: 1,227
Referee: Mohammed Al-Shammari (Qatar)

=== Final ===
15 November 2022
21:00

Qatar	1–3	Saudi Arabia
Taha 49' (pen.)	Report	A. Al-Ghamdi 9'; Al-Nasser 18'; Al-Juwayr 67'

King Abdullah Sports City, Jeddah
Attendance: 4,734
Referee: Wissam Rabie (Syria)

==== Winners ====
2022 WAFF U-23 Championship champion

Saudi Arabia
First title

== Awards ==
The following awards were given at the conclusion of the tournament:

=== Awards ===
Player of the Tournament

- (Saudi Arabia) Ahmed Al-Ghamdi

Golden Glove

- (Syria) Waseem Ayoub

== Goalscorers ==
There have been 26 goals scored in 11 matches, for an average of 2.36 goals per match.

2 goals

- (Oman) Al Faraj Al Kiyumi
- (Oman) Nasser Al Rawahi
- (Saudi Arabia) Ahmed Al-Ghamdi
- (Saudi Arabia) Ziyad Al-Johani
- (Saudi Arabia) Mohammed Maran
- (Syria) Mohamad Rihanieh

1 goal

- (Bahrain) Husain Abdulkarim
- (Bahrain) Mohammed Abdul Qayoom
- (Bahrain) Adel Al-Romaihi
- (Lebanon) Said Saad
- (Lebanon) Mohamad Omar Sadek
- (Oman) Salem Al Abdulsalam
- (Qatar) Mostafa Qadeera
- (Qatar) Diyab Taha
- (Qatar) Mekki Tombari
- (Saudi Arabia) Musab Al-Juwayr
- (Saudi Arabia) Saad Al-Nasser
- (Syria) Mahmoud Al Aswad
- (Syria) Khaled Al Hajjah
- (Syria) Fawaz Bawadekji
