= Lebanon national under-23 football team =

National association football team

Lebanon under-23
- Nickname(s): أولمبي الأرز (The Olympic Cedars)
- Association: Lebanese Football Association (LFA)
- Confederation: AFC (Asia)
- Sub-confederation: WAFF (West Asia)
- Head coach: Bassem Marmar
- Home stadium: Various
- FIFA code: LBN
First colours	Second colours

First international
- Syria 0–1 Lebanon (Hyderabad, India; 5 August 1991)

Biggest win
- Lebanon 11–0 Afghanistan (Ulsan, South Korea; 5 October 2002)

Biggest defeat
- Lebanon 0–5 Iraq (Beirut, Lebanon; 8 September 2007); United Arab Emirates 6–1 Lebanon (Riyadh, Saudi Arabia; 22 March 2019)

AFC U-23 Asian Cup
- Appearances: 1 (first in 2026)
- Best result: Group stage (2026)

Asian Games
- Appearances: 1 (first in 2002)
- Best result: Group stage (2002)

Arab Games
- Appearances: 1 (first in 2023)
- Best result: Group stage (2023)

WAFF U-23 Championship
- Appearances: 4 (first in 2021)
- Best result: Group stage (2021, 2023)

The Lebanon national under-23 football team (Arabic: منتخب لبنان تحت 23 سنة لكرة القدم), also known as the Lebanon Olympic football team (Arabic: منتخب لبنان الأولمبي لكرة القدم), represents Lebanon in international under-23 association football competitions. Controlled by the Lebanese Football Association (LFA), the squad is governed by the Asian Football Confederation (AFC) continentally, and FIFA worldwide. The team also serves as the national under-22 football team of Lebanon.

The team is composed of players under the age of 23, with the exception of the Olympic Games, where up to three overage players are permitted. Although they have never qualified for the Olympic Games, they competed in the 2026 AFC U-23 Asian Cup and the 2002 Asian Games, with group-stage exits in both instances. The team also compete in the Arab Games and the WAFF U-23 Championship.

== Competitive record ==
=== Olympic Games ===
Olympic Games record										Qualification record						
Host nation, city and year	Round	Pos	Pld	W	D	L	GF	GA	Squad	Outcome	Pld	W	D	L	GF	GA
1908–1988	See Lebanon national team									See Lebanon national team						
(Spain) Barcelona 1992	Did not qualify									4th of 5	4	1	0	3	4	5
(United States) Atlanta 1996	Did not participate									Did not participate						
(Australia) Sydney 2000	Did not qualify									2nd of 3	4	1	1	2	4	5
(Greece) Athens 2004	Did not qualify									First round win, Second round win, 4th of 4	10	1	4	5	15	21
(China) Beijing 2008	Did not qualify									2nd of 4, 4th of 4	11	5	1	5	10	19
(United Kingdom) London 2012	Did not qualify									Second round defeat	2	0	1	1	1	2
(Brazil) Rio 2016	Did not qualify									The 2016 AFC U-23 Championship served as the qualifying tournament						
(Japan) Tokyo 2020	Did not qualify									The 2020 AFC U-23 Championship served as the qualifying tournament						
(France) Paris 2024	Did not qualify									The 2024 AFC U-23 Asian Cup served as the qualifying tournament						
(United States) Los Angeles 2028	To be determined									The 2028 AFC U-23 Asian Cup will serve as the qualifying tournament						
Total	–	0/8	–	–	–	–	–	–	–	Total	31	8	7	16	34	52

=== AFC U-23 Asian Cup ===
AFC U-23 Asian Cup record										Qualification record						
Host nation(s) and year	Round	Pos	Pld	W	D	L	GF	GA	Squad	Outcome	Pld	W	D	L	GF	GA
(Oman) 2013	Did not qualify									5th of 6	5	1	0	4	12	18
(Qatar) 2016	Did not qualify									4th of 5	4	1	1	2	3	9
(China) 2018	Did not qualify									3rd of 4	3	1	0	2	3	4
(Thailand) 2020	Did not qualify									3rd of 4	3	1	0	2	7	8
(Uzbekistan) 2022	Did not qualify									3rd of 4	3	1	0	2	4	3
(Qatar) 2024	Did not qualify									3rd of 4	3	0	1	2	3	6
(Saudi Arabia) 2026	Group stage	11th of 16	3	1	0	2	5	7	Squad	2nd of 4	3	2	1	0	6	2
(Japan) 2028	To be determined									To be determined						
Total	Group stage	1/7	3	1	0	2	5	7	–	Total	24	7	3	14	38	50

=== Asian Games ===
Asian Games record
Host nation, city and year	Round	Pos	Pld	W	D	L	GF	GA	Squad
1951–1998	See Lebanon national football team								
(South Korea) Busan 2002	Group stage	12th of 24	3	1	1	1	12	3	Squad
(Qatar) Doha 2006	Did not participate								
(China) Guangzhou 2010	Did not participate								
(South Korea) Incheon 2014	Did not participate								
Indonesia 2018	Did not participate								
(China) Hangzhou 2022	Did not participate								
(Japan) Aichi–Nagoya 2026	To be determined								
Total	Best: group stage	1/6	3	1	1	1	12	3	–

=== Arab Games ===
Arab Games record
Host nation, city and year	Round	Pos	Pld	W	D	L	GF	GA	Squad
1953–2001	See Lebanon national football team								
Algeria 2023	Group stage	8th of 8	3	0	0	3	0	6	Squad
Saudi Arabia 2027	To be determined								
Total	Best: group stage	1/1	3	0	0	3	0	6	–

=== WAFF U-23 Championship ===
WAFF U-23 Championship record
Host nation(s) and year	Round	Pos	Pld	W	D	L	GF	GA	Squad
(Qatar) 2015	Did not participate								
(Saudi Arabia) 2021	Group stage	10th of 11	3	0	1	2	4	9	Squad
(Saudi Arabia) 2022	Fifth place play-off	6th of 6	4	0	1	2	2	5	Squad
(Iraq) 2023	Group stage	7th of 9	2	0	0	2	1	3	Squad
(Saudi Arabia) 2024	Did not participate								
(Oman) 2025	Seventh place play-off	8th of 8	3	0	1	2	2	6	Squad
Total	Best: group stage	4/6	12	0	3	8	9	23	–

=== Mediterranean Games ===
Mediterranean Games record
Host nation, city and year	Round	Pos	Pld	W	D	L	GF	GA	Squad
1951–1987	See Lebanon national football team								
(Greece) Athens 1991	Did not participate								
(France) Languedoc-Roussillon 1993	Did not participate								
(Italy) Bari 1997	Did not participate								
(Tunisia) Tunis 2001	Did not participate								
(Spain) Almería 2005	Did not participate								
(Italy) Pescara 2009	See Lebanon national under-20 football team								
(Turkey) Mersin 2013	See Lebanon national under-19 football team								
2018–present	See Lebanon national under-18 football team								
Total	N/A	0/5	0	0	0	0	0	0	–

== Record per opponent ==
Key

Positive balance (more wins than losses)
Neutral balance (as many wins as losses)
Negative balance (more losses than wins)

The following table shows Lebanon's all-time official international record per opponent:

Opponent	Pld	W	D	L	GF	GA	GD	W%	PPG (Note: According to the "three points for a win" standard)	Confederation
Afghanistan	1	1	0	0	11	0	+11	100.00	3.00	AFC
Algeria	1	0	0	1	0	2	–2	0.00	0.00	CAF
Australia	2	0	1	1	0	3	–3	0.00	0.50	AFC
Bahrain	8	0	2	6	8	17	–9	0.00	0.25	AFC
Cambodia	1	0	1	0	2	2	0	0.00	1.00	AFC
India	2	1	0	1	5	6	–1	50.00	1.50	AFC
Indonesia	6	4	0	2	11	6	+5	66.67	2.00	AFC
Iran	4	1	1	2	3	5	–2	25.00	1.00	AFC
Iraq	5	0	1	4	6	21	–15	0.00	0.20	AFC
Japan	2	0	0	2	1	6	–5	0.00	0.00	AFC
Jordan	6	0	4	2	1	5	–4	0.00	0.67	AFC
Kuwait	3	1	0	2	5	3	+2	33.33	1.00	AFC
Malaysia	3	1	1	1	2	2	+0	33.33	1.33	AFC
Maldives	2	2	0	0	8	1	+7	100.00	3.00	AFC
Mongolia	1	1	0	0	3	0	+3	100.00	3.00	AFC
Nepal	2	2	0	0	6	0	+6	100.00	3.00	OFC
North Korea	2	1	0	1	2	2	+0	50.00	1.50	AFC
Oman	7	1	0	6	5	14	–9	14.29	0.43	AFC
Palestine	4	1	1	2	6	8	–2	25.00	1.00	AFC
Qatar	3	1	2	0	3	2	+1	33.33	1.67	AFC
Saudi Arabia	3	0	0	3	1	7	–6	0.00	0.00	AFC
Sudan	2	0	1	1	0	3	–3	0.00	0.50	CAF
Syria	9	4	2	3	13	16	–3	44.44	1.56	AFC
Tajikistan	1	0	0	1	0	1	–1	0.00	0.00	AFC
Thailand	1	0	1	0	2	2	+0	0.00	1.00	AFC
Turkey	1	0	0	1	0	3	–3	0.00	0.00	AFC
Turkmenistan	1	1	0	0	4	1	+3	100.00	3.00	AFC
United Arab Emirates	9	1	2	6	13	24	–11	11.11	0.56	AFC
Uzbekistan	1	0	0	1	1	3	–2	0.00	0.00	AFC
Vietnam	2	1	0	1	1	2	–1	50.00	1.50	AFC
Yemen	1	0	0	1	1	2	–1	0.00	0.00	AFC
Total	96	25	20	51	124	169	–45	26.04	0.99	—

Last updated: Lebanon vs Iran, 13 January 2026.

== Results and fixtures ==
The following is a list of match results in the last 12 months, as well as any future matches that have been scheduled.

Win Draw Loss Fixture

=== 2026 ===
7 January 2026 2026 AFC U-23 Asian Cup group stage	Uzbekistan	3–2	Lebanon	Riyadh, Saudi Arabia
17:00 UTC+3	Saidov 24'; Khayrullaev 50'; Bakhromov 57'	Report	Shahin 65', 90+5'	Stadium: Prince Faisal bin Fahd Sports City Stadium; Attendance: 226; Referee: Tuan Yaasin (Malaysia)

10 January 2026 2026 AFC U-23 Asian Cup group stage	Lebanon	2–4	South Korea	Riyadh, Saudi Arabia
14:30 UTC+3	Shahin 13'; El Fadl 48'	Report	Lee Hyun-yong 20'; Jeong Jae-sang 56'; Kang Seong-jin 71'; Kim Tae-won 76'	Stadium: Al-Shabab Club Stadium; Attendance: 588; Referee: Abdulla Al-Marri (Qatar)

13 January 2026 2026 AFC U-23 Asian Cup group stage	Iran	0–1	Lebanon	Riyadh, Saudi Arabia
14:30 UTC+3		Report	Shahin 56' (pen.)	Stadium: Al-Shabab Club Stadium; Attendance: 122; Referee: Faisal Al-Balawi (Saudi Arabia)

14 November 2026 Friendly	Iraq	1–1	Lebanon	Nasiriyah, Iraq
18:00 UTC+3	54' (pen.)	Report	Salami 41' (pen.)	Stadium: Al-Nasiriya International Stadium

17 November 2026 Friendly	Iraq	4–1	Lebanon	Nasiriyah, Iraq
16:00 UTC+3	5'; 16'; 53'; 90+5'	Report	Salami 51'	Stadium: Al-Nasiriya International Stadium

== Coaching staff ==
As of 26 September 2026

Position	Name
Head coach	(Lebanon) Bassem Marmar
Team manager	(Lebanon) Fouad Balhawan
Assistant coach	(Lebanon) Fouad Hijazi (Lebanon) Mohammad Mortada
Goalkeeper coach	(Lebanon) Wahid El Fattal
Physiotherapist	(Lebanon) Hussein Alaaeddine
Equipment manager	(Lebanon) Eid Amar

== Players ==
The following 24 players were called up for the friendly matches against Iraq on 14 and 17 November 2026.

No.	Pos.	Player	Date of birth (age)	Club
	GK	Hassan Haidar	2 February 2006 (age 20)	(Lebanese Football Association) Nejmeh
	GK	Bahaa El Abdallah	24 June 2005 (age 21)	(Lebanese Football Association) Tripoli
	GK	Joseph Bitar	17 October 2005 (age 21)	(Lebanese Football Association) Salam Zgharta
	GK	Joshua Lakkis	22 June 2006 (age 20)	(Football Australia) Bulls FC Academy
	DF	Mohammad El Jamal	3 June 2006 (age 20)	(Lebanese Football Association) Shabab Sahel
	DF	Fadel Assi	25 September 2007 (age 19)	(Lebanese Football Association) Shabab Sahel
	DF	Kassem Watfa	31 August 2005 (age 21)	(Lebanese Football Association) Ansar
	DF	Joe Khawaja	12 August 2005 (age 21)	(Lebanese Football Association) Salam Zgharta
	DF	Hassan Jaafar	24 August 2005 (age 21)	(Lebanese Football Association) Nejmeh
	DF	Adam Kobeissi	2 August 2005 (age 21)	(Lebanese Football Association) Akhaa Ahli Aley
	DF	Josef El Hajj	30 March 2005 (age 21)	(German Football Association) SV Gonsenheim
	DF	Hassan Mohamad	22 July 2006 (age 20)	(German Football Association) Sportfreunde Lotte
	MF	Hassan Salami	21 February 2005 (age 21)	(Lebanese Football Association) Ahed
	MF	Ali El Reda Atwi	16 October 2008 (age 18)	(Lebanese Football Association) Ahed
	MF	Abdallah Dwek	17 January 2006 (age 20)	(Lebanese Football Association) Safa
	MF	Jaafar El Daly	10 July 2005 (age 21)	(Lebanese Football Association) Akhaa Ahli Aley
	MF	Fouad Khawaja	13 July 2005 (age 21)	(Lebanese Football Association) Salam Zgharta
	MF	Michael Shehadeh	2006 (age 19–20)	(Jordan Football Association) Al-Jazeera
	FW	Karim Kassem	31 October 2005 (age 21)	(Lebanese Football Association) Tadamon Sour
	FW	Fadi Zayyat	11 April 2005 (age 21)	(Lebanese Football Association) Tadamon Sour
	FW	Ali Fakieh	25 February 2005 (age 21)	(Lebanese Football Association) Jwaya
	FW	Hussein Siblini	6 February 2006 (age 20)	(Lebanese Football Association) Nejmeh
	FW	Hadi Doueik	31 March 2006 (age 20)	(Lebanese Football Association) Mabarra
	FW	Karim Slim	24 August 2005 (age 21)	(Lebanese Football Association) Safa

== See also ==
- Lebanon national football team
- Lebanon national under-20 football team
- Lebanon national under-17 football team
- Football in Lebanon
