= Nasouh Al Nakdali =

Syrian footballer (born 1993)

Nasouh Nakdali نَصُوح النَّكدَلِيّ
Personal information
- Full name: Nasouh Fawaz Nakdali
- Date of birth: 15 June 1993 (age 33)
- Place of birth: Homs, Syria
- Height: 1.82 m (5 ft 11 1/2 in)
- Positions: Attacking midfielder; winger

Team information
- Current team: Al-Fahaheel

Youth career
- Al-Karamah

Senior career*
| Years | Team | Apps | (Gls) |
| 2010–2014 | Al-Karamah | | |
| 2012 | →Zakho FC (loan) | 17 | (1) |
| 2014–2015 | Al-Khabourah | | |
| 2015–2016 | Al-Wahda | | |
| 2016–2017 | Al-Ittihad | 12 | (8) |
| 2017–2018 | Smouha | | |
| 2018 | Naft Al-Wasat | | |
| 2018–2019 | Al-Karamah | | |
| 2019–2020 | Mesaimeer | | |
| 2020–2021 | Al-Karamah | | |
| 2021–2023 | Tishreen | | |
| 2023 | Al-Wahda | | |
| 2024– | Al-Fahaheel | | |

International career^{‡}
| 2007–2008 | Syria U-17 | | |
| 2009–2012 | Syria U-20 | | |
| 2010–2012 | Syria U-23 | | |
| 2012– | Syria U-22 | 3 | (2) |
| 2012– | Syria | 15 | (0) |
- * Club domestic league appearances and goals ‡ National team caps and goals as of 1 June 2022

Nasouh Nakdali (Arabic: نَصُوح النَّكدَلِيّ) (born 15 June 1993 in Homs, Syria) is a Syrian footballer. He currently plays for Al-Fahaheel in Kuwait.

== International career ==
Al Nakali is currently a member of the Syria national football team.
