= WAFF U-23 Championship =

- Organiser(s): WAFF
- Founded: 2015
- Region: West Asia
- Teams: 11
- Current champions: Oman (1st title)
- Most championships: Iran; Iraq; Jordan; Saudi Arabia; South Korea; Oman (1 title each)
- 2026–27 WAFF U-23 Championship

The WAFF U-23 Championship (Arabic: بطولة اتحاد غرب آسيا تحت 23 عاماً) is an international football competition organised by the West Asian Football Federation (WAFF) for the men's under-23 national teams of West Asia. The competition was first held in 2015, with Iran winning the inaugural edition.

== History ==
The inaugural tournament was held in Doha, Qatar, from 30 September to 14 October 2015, with ten teams participating. Iran defeated Syria 2–0 in the final to become the first champions. The competition returned in 2021, with Saudi Arabia hosting the second edition from 4 to 12 October. Eleven teams participated, and Jordan won the title after defeating the hosts 3–1 in the final.

The third edition was held in Saudi Arabia in November 2022 after the tournament was moved from its originally designated host, Iraq. Six teams participated, with Saudi Arabia defeating Qatar 3–1 in the final to win their first title. The 2023 edition was held in Iraq from 12 to 20 June, with nine teams participating. Iraq won its first title after defeating Iran on penalties in the final.

The 2024 edition was held in Saudi Arabia from 20 to 26 March. Four WAFF members were joined by four invited teams from outside West Asia—Australia, Egypt, South Korea and Thailand—as part of the federation's efforts to expand participation. South Korea won the title, defeating Australia on penalties after a 2–2 draw in the final. The 2025 edition was held in Oman from 19 to 25 March. Eight teams participated, and Oman won its first title after defeating Jordan 3–1 in the final.

== Results ==
Edition	Year	Host	Final			Third place playoff or losing semi-finalists		
Edition	Year	Host	Champions	Score	Runners-up	Third place	Score	Fourth place
1	2015	Qatar	Iran	2–0; Abdullah bin Khalifa Stadium, Doha	Syria	Qatar	3–0; Abdullah bin Khalifa Stadium, Doha	Yemen
2	2021	Saudi Arabia	Jordan	3–1; Prince Mohamed bin Fahd Stadium, Dammam	Saudi Arabia	Iraq and Syria		
3	2022	Saudi Arabia	Saudi Arabia	3–1; King Abdullah Sports City, Jeddah	Qatar	Syria	1–0; King Abdullah Sports City, Jeddah	Oman
4	2023	Iraq	Iraq	1–1 (5–4 p); Al-Madina Stadium, Baghdad	Iran	Jordan and Oman		
5	2024	Saudi Arabia	South Korea	2–2 (4–3 p); Al Fateh Stadium, Al Mubarraz	Australia	Saudi Arabia	2–2 (4–2 p); Al Fateh Stadium, Al Mubarraz	Egypt
6	2025	Oman	Oman	3–1; Sultan Qaboos Sports Complex, Muscat	Jordan	Syria	1–0; Sultan Qaboos Sports Complex, Muscat	Bahrain
6	2026–27	Oman; To be determined To be determined						

== Teams reaching the top four ==
Team	Champions	Runners-up	Third place	Fourth place	Semi-finalist	Total (Top 4)
Saudi Arabia	1 (**2022**)	1 (**2021**)	1 (**2024**)	–	–	3
Iran	1 (2015)	1 (2023)	–	–	–	2
Oman	1 (2025)	–	–	1 (2022)	1 (2023)	3
Jordan	1 (2021)	1 (2025)	–	–	1 (2023)	3
Iraq	1 (**2023**)	–	–	–	1 (2021)	2
South Korea	1 (2024)	–	–	–	–	1
Syria	–	1 (2015)	2 (2022, 2025)	–	1 (2021)	4
Qatar	–	1 (2022)	1 (**2015**)	–	–	2
Australia	–	1 (2024)	–	–	–	1
Yemen	–	–	–	1 (2015)	–	1
Egypt	–	–	–	1 (2024)	–	1
Bahrain	–	–	–	1 (2025)	–	1

- Results from host teams shown in bold

== Comprehensive team results by tournament ==
Legend

- 1st – Champions
- 2nd – Runners-up
- 3rd – Third place
- 4th – Fourth place
- SF – Semi-finals (no third place match)
- GS – Group stage
- Q – Qualified for upcoming tournament
- • – Did not qualify
- × – Did not enter / Withdrew / Banned
- – Hosts
- No longer or not a WAFF member

For each tournament, the number of teams in each finals tournament (in brackets) are shown.

Team	2015 (Qatar) (10)	2021 (Saudi Arabia) (11)	2022 (Saudi Arabia) (6)	2023 (Iraq) (9)	2024 (Saudi Arabia) (8)	Total
Australia					**2nd**	1
Bahrain	GS	GS	GS	×	×	3
Egypt					**4th**	1
Iran	**1st**			**2nd**		2
Iraq	×	**SF**	×	**1st**	6th	3
Jordan	GS	**1st**	×	**SF**	5th	4
Kuwait	×	GS	×	×	×	1
Lebanon	×	GS	GS	GS	×	3
Oman	GS	GS	**4th**	**SF**	×	4
Palestine	GS	GS	×	GS	×	3
Qatar	**3rd**	×	**2nd**	×	×	2
Saudi Arabia	GS	**2nd**	**1st**	×	**3rd**	4
South Korea					**1st**	1
Syria	**2nd**	**SF**	**3rd**	GS	×	4
Thailand					7th	1
United Arab Emirates	GS	GS	×	GS	8th	4
Yemen	**4th**	GS	×	GS	×	3

== Awards ==
Tournament	Most Valuable Player	Top goalscorer(s)	Goals	Best goalkeeper
2015	(Iran) Amir Arsalan Motahari	(Qatar) Akram Afif	4	(Iran) Mohammad Reza Akhbari
2021	(Jordan) Yazan Al-Naimat	(Jordan) Mohammad Aburiziq	4	(Saudi Arabia) Nawaf Al-Aqidi
2022	(Saudi Arabia) Ahmed Al-Ghamdi	(Oman) Al Faraj Al Kiyumi (Oman) Nasser Al Rawahi (Saudi Arabia) Ahmed Al-Ghamdi (Saudi Arabia) Ziyad Al-Johani (Saudi Arabia) Mohammed Maran (Syria) Mohamad Rihanieh	2	(Syria) Waseem Ayoub
2023	(Iraq) Muntadher Mohammed	(Iraq) Hussein Abdullah	3	(Iraq) Kumel Al-Rekabe

=== Winning coaches ===
Year	Team	Coach
2015	Iran	(Iran) Mohammad Khakpour
2021	Jordan	(Jordan) Ahmad Hayel
2022	Saudi Arabia	(Saudi Arabia) Saad Al-Shehri
2023	Iraq	(Iraq) Radhi Shenaishil
2024	South Korea	(South Korea) Myung Jae-yong

== Overall team records ==
Teams are ranked by total points, then by goal difference, then by goals scored.

As of 2024 WAFF U-23 Championship

Rank	Team	Part	Pld	W	D	L	GF	GA	GD	Pts
1	Jordan	4	14	8	3	3	27	16	+11	27
2	Saudi Arabia	4	13	7	3	3	23	15	+8	24
3	Syria	4	13	6	1	6	18	20	–2	19
4	Iran	2	8	4	4	0	13	6	+7	16
5	Iraq	3	11	4	4	3	15	12	+3	16
6	Qatar	2	9	4	3	2	11	7	+4	15
7	Oman	4	12	4	1	7	15	15	0	13
8	Palestine	3	8	4	1	3	9	10	–1	13
9	Yemen	3	10	3	2	5	10	16	–6	11
10	South Korea	1	3	2	1	0	4	2	+2	7
11	United Arab Emirates	4	10	2	1	7	10	16	–6	7
12	Bahrain	3	7	2	0	5	6	15	–9	6
13	Australia	1	3	1	2	0	5	4	+1	5
14	Egypt	1	3	1	2	0	4	3	+1	5
15	Thailand	1	3	1	0	2	2	4	–6	3
16	Kuwait	1	3	0	2	1	3	4	–1	2
17	Lebanon	3	8	0	2	6	7	17	–10	2

== See also ==
- WAFF Championship
- WAFF U-19 Championship
- WAFF U-17 Championship
- AFC U-23 Asian Cup
