= Ali Al Rina =

Syrian footballer (born 2004)

Personal information
- Full name: Ali Mahmoud Al Rina
- Date of birth: 10 January 2004 (age 22)
- Place of birth: Syria
- Height: 1.87 m (6 ft 2 in)
- Position: Centre-back

Team information
- Current team: Al-Karkh

Youth career
- –2021: Al-Ittihad Ahli

Senior career*
Years	Team	Apps	(Gls)
2021–2025	Al-Ittihad Ahli	0	(0)
2025	→ Lion City Sailors (loan)	3	(0)
2025–	Al-Karkh		

International career^{‡}
	Syria U18	2	(0)
2022–2024	Syria U20	5	(0)
2023–	Syria U23	2	(0)
2024–	Syria	1	(0)
- * Club domestic league appearances and goals as of 12 April 2025 ‡ National team caps and goals as of 9 April 2025

Ali Mahmoud Al Rina (born 10 January 2004) is a Syrian professional footballer who plays as a centre-back for Iraqi Premier League club Al-Karkh and the Syria national team.

== Club career ==
=== Al-Ittihad Ahli ===
Ali is a youth product of Syrian Premier League club Al-Ittihad Ahli. Ali played all six group-stage matches for Al Ittihad in the 2023–24 AFC Cup.

==== Loan to Lion City Sailors ====
It was announced on 10 February 2025 that Ali would join Singapore Premier League club Lion City Sailors until the end of the 2024–25 season becoming the first Syrian to play in the league. Ali made his debut for the club in the AFC Champions League Two match against Muangthong United, after coming on to replace Bart Ramselaar.

On 16 February 2025, Ali made his first start for the Sailors in a 4–1 win against Tanjong Pagar United in the 2024–25 Singapore Cup. He make his league debut in a 1–1 draw against Hougang United on 9 March. Despite Maxime Lestienne's equaliser in the 91st minute of the 2025 AFC Champions League Two final against Sharjah, Ali finished as a runner-up after a 1–2 defeat.

== International career ==
Ali has featured for the various age groups for Syria. In September 2022, Ali was called up to the Syria U20 squad for the 2023 AFC U-20 Asian Cup qualification where he played in four of the group stage matches. Ali was then called up to Syria U23 squad for the WAFF U-23 Championship where he played against Palestine U23.

Ali made his senior international debut in a 2–0 win over Mauritius at the 2024 FIFA Intercontinental Cup in September.

== Career statistics ==
=== Club ===
As of match played 7 June 2025

Appearances and goals by club, season and competition
Club	Season	League			National cup		League cup		Continental		Other		Total	
Club	Season	Division	Apps	Goals	Apps	Goals	Apps	Goals	Apps	Goals	Apps	Goals	Apps	Goals
Al Ittihad Ahli	2023–24	Syrian Premier League	0	0	0	0	0	0	6 (Note: Appearance(s) in AFC Cup)	0	—		0	0
Al Ittihad Ahli	Total		0	0	0	0	0	0	6	0	0	0	6	0
Lion City Sailors (loan)	2024–25	Singapore Premier League	3	0	1	0	0	0	3 (Note: Appearance(s) in AFC Champions League Two)	0	—		7	0
Career total			3	0	1	0	0	0	9	0	0	0	13	0

=== International ===
As of match played 12 April 2025

Appearances and goals by national team and year
National team	Year	Apps	Goals
Syria	2024	1	0
Syria	2025	0	0
Total		1	0

== Honours ==
Lion City Sailors

- AFC Champions League Two runner-up: 2024–25
- Singapore Premier League: 2024–25
- Singapore Cup: 2024–25
