= 2021 WAFF U-23 Championship =

بطولة غرب آسيا لكرة القدم تحت 23 عاما

Tournament details
- Host country: Saudi Arabia
- Dates: 4–12 October
- Teams: 12 (from 1 confederation) (from 1 sub-confederation)
- Venue: 2 (in 2 host cities)

Final positions
- Champions: Jordan (1st title)
- Runners-up: Saudi Arabia

Tournament statistics
- Matches played: 18
- Goals scored: 51 (2.83 per match)
- Top scorer(s): (Jordan) Mohammad Aburiziq (4 goals)
- Best player: (Jordan) Yazan Al-Naimat
- Best goalkeeper: (Saudi Arabia) Nawaf Al-Aqidi

The 2021 WAFF U-23 Championship was the second edition of the WAFF U-23 Championship, an under-23 international tournament for member nations of the West Asian Football Federation (WAFF). It took place in Saudi Arabia from 4 to 12 October 2021, featuring 11 teams. Only players born on or after 1 January 1998 were eligible to participate. Iran were the defending champions; however, they couldn't defend the title after they joined CAFA.

Jordan won their first tournament, beating hosts Saudi Arabia 3–1 in the final.

== Teams ==
=== Participants ===
A total of eleven teams participated in the competition. All WAFF members, other than Qatar, agreed to take part in the tournament.

Team	Appearance	Last appearance	Previous best performance
Bahrain	2nd	2015	Group stage
Iraq	1st	Debut	–
Jordan	2nd	2015	Group stage
Kuwait	1st	Debut	–
Lebanon	1st	Debut	–
Oman	2nd	2015	Group stage
Palestine	2nd	2015	Group stage
Saudi Arabia	2nd	2015	Group stage
Syria	2nd	2015	Runners-up
United Arab Emirates	2nd	2015	Group stage
Yemen	2nd	2015	Semi-finals

=== Draw ===
The eleven teams were drawn into three groups on 12 September 2021: Group A and B with four teams and Group C with three. The three group winners, alongside the best group runner-up, directly advanced to the knock-out stage.

=== Squads ===
Each team had to register a squad of up to 23 players, three of whom goalkeepers.

== Venues ==
Khobar	2021 WAFF U-23 Championship is located in Saudi Arabia	Dammam
Prince Saud bin Jalawi Stadium	2021 WAFF U-23 Championship is located in Saudi Arabia	Prince Mohamed bin Fahd Stadium
Capacity: 15,000	2021 WAFF U-23 Championship is located in Saudi Arabia	Capacity: 26,000

== Group stage ==
The three group winners and the best group runner-up advanced to the semi-finals.

All times are local, AST (UTC+3).

=== Group A ===
Pos	Team	Pld	W	D	L	GF	GA	GD	Pts	Qualification
1	Jordan	3	2	0	1	4	3	+1	6	Knockout stage
2	Yemen	3	1	1	1	3	3	0	4	
3	Oman	3	1	1	1	2	2	0	4	
4	Kuwait	3	0	2	1	3	4	−1	2	

Source: kooora
Rules for classification: Group stage tiebreakers
4 October 2021
17:45

Jordan	0–1	Oman
	Report	Al Naabi 42'

Prince Saud bin Jalawi Stadium, Khobar
Referee: Yahya Al Mulla (United Arab Emirates)
4 October 2021
20:45

Yemen	1–1	Kuwait
Al-Dahi 52'	Report	Al-Rashidi 42'

Prince Saud bin Jalawi Stadium, Khobar
Referee: Shukri Al-Hanfoush (Saudi Arabia)

6 October 2021
15:30

Oman	0–1	Yemen
	Report	Al-Gahwashi 28'

Prince Saud bin Jalawi Stadium, Khobar
Referee: Mohammad Qanah (Syria)
6 October 2021
18:30

Kuwait	1–2	Jordan
Al-Rashidi 8'	Report	Abu Taha 58'; Aburiziq 88'

Prince Saud bin Jalawi Stadium, Khobar
Referee: Mohammad Issa (Lebanon)

8 October 2021
17:45

Jordan	2–1	Yemen
Awad 35' (pen.); Aburiziq 87'	Report	Al-Dahi 40'

Prince Saud bin Jalawi Stadium, Khobar
Referee: Sami Al-Jires (Saudi Arabia)
8 October 2021
20:45

Kuwait	1–1	Oman
Al-Salamah 90+7'	Report	Al Balushi 53'

Prince Saud bin Jalawi Stadium, Khobar
Referee: Muath Al Oufi (Palestine)

=== Group B ===
Pos	Team	Pld	W	D	L	GF	GA	GD	Pts	Qualification
1	Iraq	3	2	1	0	5	2	+3	7	Knockout stage
2	Palestine	3	2	0	1	5	3	+2	6	
3	United Arab Emirates	3	1	0	2	3	3	0	3	
4	Lebanon	3	0	1	2	4	9	−5	1	

Source: kooora
Rules for classification: Group stage tiebreakers
4 October 2021
15:30

Palestine	0–1	Iraq
	Report	Abdulkareem 81'

Prince Mohamed bin Fahd Stadium, Dammam
Referee: Mokhtar Al-Arami (Yemen)
4 October 2021
18:30

United Arab Emirates	3–0	Lebanon
Obaid 32'; Abdulrahman 34'; Abdulla 78'	Report

Prince Mohamed bin Fahd Stadium, Dammam
Referee: Sultan Al-Harbi (Saudi Arabia)

6 October 2021
20:45

Lebanon	2–4	Palestine
Nasser 28'; Bader 62'	Report	Direya 6', 12', 71'; Al-Nabris 47'

Prince Mohamed bin Fahd Stadium, Dammam
Referee: Mohammad Deham (Bahrain)
6 October 2021
21:30

Iraq	2–0	United Arab Emirates
Zamel 41'; Abdulameer 90+2'	Report

Prince Saud bin Jalawi Stadium, Khobar
Referee: Khaled Al-Teris (Saudi Arabia)

8 October 2021
15:30

Palestine	1–0	United Arab Emirates
Mousa 16'	Report

Prince Mohamed bin Fahd Stadium, Dammam
Referee: Faisal Al-Blwi (Saudi Arabia)
8 October 2021
21:30

Lebanon	2–2	Iraq
Nasser 33', 45'	Report	Iqbal 15'; Sartip 55'

Prince Mohamed bin Fahd Stadium, Dammam
Referee: Shukri Al-Hanfoush (Saudi Arabia)

=== Group C ===
Pos	Team	Pld	W	D	L	GF	GA	GD	Pts	Qualification
1	Saudi Arabia (H)	2	2	0	0	5	0	+5	6	Knockout stage
2	Syria	2	1	0	1	4	3	+1	3	Knockout stage
3	Bahrain	2	0	0	2	1	7	−6	0	

Source: kooora
Rules for classification: Group stage tiebreakers
(H) Hosts
4 October 2021
21:30

Bahrain	1–4	Syria
Al Hayki 67'	Report	Mohammad 7'; Al Khassi 29'; Al Hallak 79'; Akil 90+3'

Prince Mohamed bin Fahd Stadium, Dammam
Referee: Mohammed Salman (Iraq)

6 October 2021
17:45

Syria	0–2	Saudi Arabia
	Report	Al-Hamdan 11' (pen.); Radif 90+2' (pen.)

Prince Mohamed bin Fahd Stadium, Dammam
Referee: Ahmad Al-Ali (Kuwait)

8 October 2021
18:30

Saudi Arabia	3–0	Bahrain
Al-Yami 48'; Radif 54'; Maran 73'	Report

Prince Mohamed bin Fahd Stadium, Dammam
Referee: Yahya Al Mulla (United Arab Emirates)

=== Ranking of second-placed teams ===
The best runner-up team from the three groups advanced to the semi-finals along with the three group winners. Group C contained only three teams compared to four teams in the other two groups. Therefore, the results against the fourth-placed team were not counted when determining the ranking of the runner-up teams.

Pos	Grp	Team	Pld	W	D	L	GF	GA	GD	Pts	Qualification
1	C	Syria	2	1	0	1	4	3	+1	3	Knockout stage
2	A	Yemen	2	1	0	1	2	2	0	3	
3	B	Palestine	2	1	0	1	1	1	0	3	

Source: kooora
Rules for classification: 1) Points; 2) Goal difference; 3) Goals scored; 4) Fair play points; 5) Drawing of lots.

== Knockout stage ==
=== Bracket ===
Semi-finals
10 October – Khobar
Jordan	5
Syria	2
10 October – Dammam
Iraq	0
Saudi Arabia	1

Final
12 October – Dammam
Jordan	3
Saudi Arabia	1

=== Semi-finals ===
10 October 2021
17:45

Jordan	5–2	Syria
Siahin 6'; Al-Naimat 19'; Al-Hourani 44'; Aburiziq 81'; Sadeh 90+4' (pen.)	Report	Rihanieh 61'; Bashmani 86'

Prince Saud bin Jalawi Stadium, Khobar
Referee: Khaled Al-Teris (Saudi Arabia)

10 October 2021
20:00

Iraq	0–1	Saudi Arabia
	Report	Al-Ghannam 49'

Prince Mohamed bin Fahd Stadium, Dammam
Referee: Mohammad Issa (Lebanon)

=== Final ===
12 October 2021
17:30

Jordan	3–1	Saudi Arabia
Al-Naimat 29'; Abu Al-Jazar 76'; Aburiziq 90+4'	Report	Al-Ghannam 20'

Prince Mohamed bin Fahd Stadium, Dammam
Referee: Ahmad Al-Ali (Kuwait)

=== Champion ===
2021 WAFF U-23 Championship champion

Jordan
First title

== Statistics ==
=== Goalscorers ===
There have been 51 goals scored in 18 matches, for an average of 2.83 goals per match.

4 goals

- (Jordan) Mohammad Aburiziq

3 goals

- (Lebanon) Mohammad Nasser
- (Palestine) Mohammed Direya

2 goals

- (Jordan) Yazan Al-Naimat
- (Kuwait) Eid Al-Rashidi
- (Saudi Arabia) Khalid Al-Ghannam
- (Saudi Arabia) Abdullah Radif
- (Yemen) Omar Al-Dahi

1 goal

- (Bahrain) Said Al Hayki
- (Iraq) Hassan Abdul Karim
- (Iraq) Zidane Iqbal
- (Iraq) Muntadher Mohammed
- (Iraq) Ahmed Sartip
- (Iraq) Sadeq Zamel
- (Jordan) Yousef Abu Al-Jazar
- (Jordan) Mohannad Abu Taha
- (Jordan) Hadi Al-Hourani
- (Jordan) Abdullah Awad
- (Jordan) Ibrahim Sadeh
- (Jordan) Khaled Siahin
- (Kuwait) Bandar Al-Salamah
- (Lebanon) Khalil Bader
- (Oman) Abdullah Al Balushi
- (Oman) Issa Al Naabi
- (Palestine) Khaled Al-Nabris
- (Palestine) Bader Mousa
- (Saudi Arabia) Abdullah Al-Hamdan
- (Saudi Arabia) Hamad Al-Yami
- (Saudi Arabia) Mohammed Maran
- (Syria) Amin Akil
- (Syria) Mohammad Al Hallak
- (Syria) Ahmad Al Khassi
- (Syria) Ali Bashmani
- (Syria) Yosief Mohammad
- (Syria) Mohamad Rihanieh
- (United Arab Emirates) Ahmed Abdulla
- (United Arab Emirates) Abdulla Abdulrahman
- (United Arab Emirates) Saeed Obaid
- (Yemen) Nasser Al-Gahwashi

=== Awards ===
Player of the Tournament

- (Jordan) Yazan Al-Naimat

Golden Boot

- (Jordan) Mohammad Aburiziq

Golden Glove

- (Saudi Arabia) Nawaf Al-Aqidi
