= Mohamad Rihanieh =

Syrian footballer (born 2001)

Personal information
- Full name: Mohamad Rihanieh
- Date of birth: 26 December 2001 (age 24)
- Place of birth: Idlib, Syria
- Height: 1.69 m (5 ft 7 in)
- Position: Attacking midfielder

Team information
- Current team: Al-Faisaly
- Number: 19

Youth career
- Al-Ittihad

Senior career*
| Years | Team | Apps | (Gls) |
| 2019–2024 | Ahli Aleppo | | (3) |
| 2023 | → Hatta (loan) | | |
| 2024– | Al-Faisaly | | (3) |

International career^{‡}
| 2020– | Syria U23 | 9 | (3) |
| 2020– | Syria | 21 | (1) |
- * Club domestic league appearances and goals as of 7 June 2021 ‡ National team caps and goals as of 28 March 2023

Mohamad Rihanieh (Arabic: مُحَمَّد رَيْحَانِيَّة; born 26 December 2001) is a Syrian professional footballer who plays as an attacking midfielder for Jordanian Pro League club Al-Faisaly and the Syria national team.

== International goals ==
=== Syria U23 ===
| No. | Date | Venue | Opponent | Score | Result | Competition |
|---|---|---|---|---|---|---|
| 1. | 10 October 2021 | Prince Saud bin Jalawi Stadium, Khobar, KSA | Jordan | 1–3 | 2–5 | 2021 WAFF U-23 Championship |
| 2. | 3 November 2022 | King Abdullah Sports Hall, Jeddah, KSA | Bahrain | 1–1 | 1–2 | 2022 WAFF U-23 Championship |
| 3. | 6 November 2022 | King Abdullah Sports Hall, Jeddah, KSA | Saudi Arabia | 2–0 | 2–1 | 2022 WAFF U-23 Championship |

=== Syria ===
| No. | Date | Venue | Opponent | Score | Result | Competition |
|---|---|---|---|---|---|---|
| 1. | 20 November 2022 | Rashid Stadium, Dubai, UAE | Venezuela | 1–1 | 1–2 | Friendly |

== Honours ==
=== International ===
Syria U23

- WAFF U-23 Championship:
  - Third place: 2022
  - Best scorer: 2022
