= Abdallah Awad =

Jordanian footballer (born 2000)

Personal information
- Full name: Abdallah Khaled Awad Al-Shuaibat
- Date of birth: 19 February 2000 (age 26)
- Place of birth: Amman, Jordan
- Height: 1.82 m (6 ft 0 in)
- Position: Forward

Team information
- Current team: Al-Wehdat
- Number: 11

Youth career
- –2020: Al-Faisaly

Senior career*
Years	Team	Apps	(Gls)
2020–2024	Al-Faisaly		
2023–2024	→Al-Salt (loan)		
2024–2025	Al-Sareeh	17	(2)
2025	Al-Ahli	10	(3)
2026–	Al-Wehdat	8	(0)

International career^{‡}
2021–2022	Jordan U23	6	(1)
2025–	Jordan	1	(0)
- * Club domestic league appearances and goals as of 8 May 2026 ‡ National team caps and goals as of 15 October 2025

Abdallah Khaled Awad Al-Shuaibat (Arabic: عبدالله خالد خليل الشعيبات; born 19 February 2000), also known simply as Abdallah Awad (Arabic: عبدالله عوض), is a Jordanian professional footballer who plays as a forward for Jordanian Pro League club Al-Wehdat and the Jordan national team.

== Club career ==
=== Al-Faisaly ===
Born in Amman, Awad began his international career with Al-Faisaly during the 2020 Jordanian Pro League season.

=== Al-Ahli ===
Awad joined Al-Ahli as a free agent. He scored his first goal for the club in a 1–0 victory against Al-Sarhan.

=== Al-Wehdat ===
On 27 January 2026, Awad joined Al-Wehdat for a contract that lasts for a season and a half.

== International career ==
Awad began his international career with the Jordan under-23 team to participate in the 2021 WAFF U-23 Championship. He scored his only goal against Yemen in a 2–1 victory.

On 24 August 2025, Awad was called up to the Jordan national team to participate in friendly matches against Russia and Dominican Republic, becoming one of four players to enter the national team for the first time.
