= Mohamad Omar Sadek =

Lebanese footballer (born 2003)

Personal information
- Full name: Mohamad Omar Sadek
- Date of birth: 25 October 2003 (age 23)
- Place of birth: Tripoli, Lebanon
- Height: 1.69 m (5 ft 7 in)
- Position: Winger

Team information
- Current team: Tripoli
- Number: 10

Youth career
- –2021: Tripoli
- 2021–2022: Bourj

Senior career*
Years	Team	Apps	(Gls)
2020–2021	Tripoli	13	(1)
2021–2023	Bourj	28	(7)
2023–2026	Nejmeh	42	(12)
2026–	Tripoli	0	(0)

International career^{‡}
2021	Lebanon U18		
2022	Lebanon U20	3	(2)
2022–2026	Lebanon U23	14	(2)
2023	Lebanon	5	(1)
Medal record
Men's football
Representing Lebanon
WAFF U-18 Championship
Silver medal – second place	2021	U-18 Team
- * Club domestic league appearances and goals as of 25 August 2026 ‡ National team caps and goals as of 13 January 2026

Mohamad Omar Sadek (Arabic: محمد عمر صادق; born 25 October 2003) is a Lebanese footballer who plays as a winger for Lebanese Premier League club Tripoli.

== Club career ==
Sadek began his senior career with Tripoli, making 13 appearances and scoring once during the 2020–21 Lebanese Premier League season.

In August 2021, Bourj signed Sadek from Tripoli ahead of the 2021–22 Lebanese Premier League season. He played in their youth setup, helping them win the youth league title. Sadek scored two goals in seven league appearances during the 2021–22 season, before becoming a regular for Bourj in 2022–23, when he scored five goals in 20 league appearances.

In April 2023, Sadek joined Nejmeh ahead of the 2023–24 season. He made his club debut on 5 August, scoring in the opening league match of the season against Tripoli. During his first season with Nejmeh, Sadek made six league appearances and scored three goals. He also made appearances in the AFC Cup.

On 25 August 2026, Sadek returned to Tripoli, signing a three-year contract with the club.

== International career ==
=== Youth ===
Sadek represented Lebanon at various youth levels. In 2021, he was part of Lebanon's squad for the WAFF U-18 Championship, where the team reached the final before finishing as runners-up to Iraq. Sadek represented the Lebanon national under-20 team in the 2023 AFC U-20 Asian Cup qualification, playing three games and scoring twice.

He also played for the under-23 team in the 2022 WAFF U-23 Championship and subsequent Olympic qualification cycle. He was subsequently involved with Lebanon's under-23 side in the 2025 WAFF U-23 Championship and the 2026 AFC U-23 Asian Cup qualification, as Lebanon secured its first-ever qualification for the AFC U-23 Asian Cup final tournament.

Sadek was selected for Lebanon's squad for the 2026 AFC U-23 Asian Cup, held in Saudi Arabia in January 2026. He appeared in all three of Lebanon's group matches, providing an assist against Uzbekistan.

=== Senior ===
On 27 March 2023, Sadek made his international senior debut in a 2–0 friendly defeat to Oman. Sadek scored his first senior international goal on 25 June 2023, in a 4–1 win against Bhutan in the 2023 SAFF Championship.

== Career statistics ==
=== International ===
As of match played 1 July 2023

Appearances and goals by national team and year
National team	Year	Apps	Goals
Lebanon	2023	5	1
Total		5	1

Scores and results list Lebanon's goal tally first, score column indicates score after each Sadek goal.

List of international goals scored by Mohamad Omar Sadek
No.	Date	Venue	Opponent	Score	Result	Competition
1	25 June 2023	Sree Kanteerava Stadium, Bangalore, India	Bhutan	1–0	4–1	2023 SAFF Championship

== Honours ==
Nejmeh

- Lebanese Premier League: 2023–24
- Lebanese FA Cup: 2025–26
- Lebanese Super Cup: 2023, 2024

Lebanon U18

- WAFF U-18 Championship runner-up: 2021
