= Sultan Saif =

Emirati footballer (1993–2020)

Personal information
- Full name: Sultan Saif Al-Khabil
- Date of birth: 10 June 1993
- Place of birth: United Arab Emirates
- Date of death: 15 October 2020 (aged 27)
- Place of death: Abu Dhabi, United Arab Emirates
- Height: 1.80 m (5 ft 11 in)
- Position: Striker

Youth career
- Al-Wahda

Senior career*
Years	Team	Apps	(Gls)
2012–2018	Al-Wahda	23	(2)
2016–2017	→ Baniyas (loan)	11	(0)
2017–2018	→ Ittihad Kalba (loan)		
2019–2020	Al-Falah	18	(15)
- * Club domestic league appearances and goals

Sultan Saif (Arabic: سلطان سيف; 10 June 1993 – 15 October 2020) was an Emirati footballer. He played as a striker.

He died on 15 October 2020, due to a traffic collision in Abu Dhabi.
