= Syria national under-23 football team =

National association football team

Syria U-23
- Nickname(s): Nosour Qasioun (Arabic: نسور قاسيون, lit. 'The Qasioun Eagles')
- Association: Syrian Football Association
- Confederation: AFC (Asia)
- Sub-confederation: WAFF (West Asia); UAFA (Arab world)
- Head coach: Jehad Al-Hussain
- FIFA code: SYR
| First colours | Second colours |

Summer Olympics
- Appearances: None

AFC U-23 Championship
- Appearances: 4 (first in 2013)
- Best result: Quarter-finals (2013, 2020)

Asian Games
- Appearances: 2 (first in 2006)
- Best result: Quarter-finals (2018)

WAFF U-23 Championship
- Appearances: 3 (first in 2015)
- Best result: (silver) Runners-up (2015)

The Syria national under-23 football team (Arabic: منتخب سوريا لكرة القدم تحت 23 سنة) is a national youth association football team representing Syria in the Olympics, the AFC U-23 Championship, the WAFF U-23 Championship and all other under-23 international football tournaments. It is controlled by the Syrian Football Association. The team is also known as the Syria Olympic football team (Arabic: منتخب سوريا الأولمبي لكرة القدم).

== Results and fixtures ==
=== 2025 ===
Win Draw Lose Fixture

| 30 December Friendly | Syria | 2–1 | Vietnam | Doha, Qatar |
| 15:00 UTC+3 | Mhanna 39'; Osman 57' | Report | Nguyễn Lê Phát 88' | Stadium: Hamad bin Khalifa Stadium |

=== 2026 ===
| 7 January 2026 2026 AFC U-23 Asian Cup GS | Japan | 5–0 | Syria | Jeddah, Saudi Arabia |
| 14:30 | Ozeki 10'; Satō 66', 75'; Ishibashi 87'; Michiwaki 90+3' (pen.) | Report | | Stadium: King Abdullah Sports City Hall Stadium; Attendance: 522; Referee: Zaid Thamer Mohammed (Iraq) |

| 10 January 2026 AFC U-23 Asian Cup GS | Syria | 1–0 | Qatar | Prince Abdullah Al-Faisal Sports City Stadium, Jeddah |
| 19:30 UTC+3 | Al Aswad 85' (pen.) | Report | | Attendance: 898; Referee: Faisal Al-Balawi (Saudi Arabia) |

| 13 January 2026 AFC U-23 Asian Cup GS | United Arab Emirates | 1–1 | Syria | Prince Abdullah Al-Faisal Sports City Stadium, Jeddah |
| 14:30 UTC+3 | Al-Memari 23' | Report | Al Omar 55' | Attendance: 1,538; Referee: Asker Nadjafaliev (Uzbekistan) |

== Competitive record ==
=== Olympic Games ===
| Olympic Games record | | | | | | | | Olympic Games qualifications record | | | | | |
| Hosts/Year | Result | GP | W | D* | L | GS | GA | GP | W | D* | L | GS | GA |
|---|---|---|---|---|---|---|---|---|---|---|---|---|---|
| 1908–1988 | See Syria national team | | | | | | | See Syria national team | | | | | |
| (Spain) 1992 | Did not qualify | | | | | | | 4 | 2 | 2 | 0 | 3 | 1 |
| (United States) 1996 | Did not qualify | | | | | | | 4 | 0 | 1 | 3 | 2 | 6 |
| (Australia) 2000 | Did not qualify | | | | | | | 4 | 1 | 0 | 3 | 8 | 7 |
| (Greece) 2004 | Did not qualify | | | | | | | 4 | 3 | 0 | 1 | 11 | 5 |
| (China) 2008 | Did not qualify | | | | | | | 12 | 3 | 5 | 4 | 14 | 14 |
| (United Kingdom) 2012 | Did not qualify | | | | | | | 10 | 5 | 2 | 3 | 20 | 11 |
| (Brazil) 2016 | Did not qualify | | | | | | | 6 | 4 | 0 | 2 | 15 | 8 |
| (Japan) 2020 | Did not qualify | | | | | | | 7 | 3 | 2 | 2 | 9 | 6 |
| (France) 2024 | Did not enter | | | | | | | Did not enter | | | | | |
| (United States) 2028 | | | | | | | | | | | | | |
| Total | 0/7 | - | - | - | - | - | - | 51 | 21 | 12 | 18 | 82 | 58 |

=== AFC U-23 Championship ===
| AFC U-23 Asian Cup record | | | | | | | | | Qualification record | | | | | |
| Year | Round | GP | W | D* | L | GS | GA | Squad | GP | W | D | L | GS | GA |
|---|---|---|---|---|---|---|---|---|---|---|---|---|---|---|
| (Oman) 2013 | Quarter-finals | 4 | 2 | 1 | 1 | 4 | 3 | Squad | 5 | 4 | 1 | 0 | 13 | 3 |
| (Qatar) 2016 | Group Stage | 3 | 1 | 0 | 2 | 5 | 7 | Squad | 3 | 3 | 0 | 0 | 10 | 1 |
| (China) 2018 | Group Stage | 3 | 0 | 2 | 1 | 1 | 3 | Squad | 3 | 1 | 2 | 0 | 3 | 1 |
| (Thailand) 2020 | Quarter-finals | 4 | 1 | 1 | 2 | 4 | 5 | Squad | 3 | 2 | 1 | 0 | 5 | 1 |
| (Uzbekistan) 2022 | Did not qualify | | | | | | | | 3 | 1 | 2 | 0 | 6 | 1 |
| (Qatar) 2024 | Did not qualify | | | | | | | | 3 | 1 | 0 | 2 | 11 | 4 |
| (Saudi Arabia) 2026 | Group Stage | 3 | 1 | 1 | 1 | 2 | 6 | Squad | 3 | 3 | 0 | 0 | 7 | 3 |
| (Japan) 2028 | To be determined | | | | | | | | To be determined | | | | | |
| Total | 5/8 | 17 | 5 | 5 | 7 | 16 | 24 | — | 23 | 15 | 6 | 2 | 55 | 14 |

=== Asian Games ===
From 2002 Asian Games, at the first tournament to be played in an under-23 format.

| Year | Round | GP | W | D* | L | GS | GA | Squad |
|---|---|---|---|---|---|---|---|---|
| (South Korea) 2002 | Did not enter | | | | | | | |
| (Qatar) 2006 | 12th | 6 | 2 | 3 | 1 | 6 | 2 | Squad |
| (China) 2010 | Did not enter | | | | | | | |
| (South Korea) 2014 | Did not enter | | | | | | | |
| (Indonesia) 2018 | 6th | 5 | 3 | 0 | 2 | 7 | 6 | Squad |
| (China) 2022 | Withdrew | | | | | | | |
| (Japan) 2026 | Did not enter | | | | | | | |
| Total | 2/6 | 11 | 5 | 3 | 3 | 13 | 8 | |

=== WAFF U-23 Championship ===
WAFF U-23 Championship record
| Year | Result | GP | W | D | L | GS | GA | Squad |
|---|---|---|---|---|---|---|---|---|
| (Qatar) 2015 | Runners-up | 4 | 3 | 0 | 1 | 6 | 4 | Squad |
| (Saudi Arabia) 2021 | Semi-finals | 3 | 1 | 0 | 2 | 6 | 8 | Squad |
| (Saudi Arabia) 2022 | Third place | 4 | 2 | 1 | 1 | 5 | 4 | Squad |
| (Iraq) 2023 | Group stage | 2 | 0 | 0 | 2 | 1 | 4 | Squad |
| Total | 4/4 | 13 | 6 | 1 | 6 | 18 | 20 | |

=== Arab Games ===
Arab Games record
| Year | Round | Pld | W | D* | L | GF | GA | Squad |
|---|---|---|---|---|---|---|---|---|
| 1953 to 2011 | See Syria national football team | | | | | | | |
| (Algeria) 2023 | Runners-up | 5 | 2 | 3 | 0 | 8 | 4 | Squad |
| (Saudi Arabia) 2027 | To be determined | | | | | | | |
| Total | 1/1 | 5 | 2 | 3 | 0 | 8 | 4 | |

*Denotes draws include knockout matches decided via penalty shoot-out.

== Players ==
=== Current squad ===
The following players were called up for the 2026 AFC U-23 Asian Cup qualification, between 3 and 9 September 2025.

| No. | Pos. | Player | Date of birth (age) | Club |
|---|---|---|---|---|
| | GK | Modar Al Katib | | |
| | GK | Maksim Sarraf | | (Uzbekistan Football Association) Zomin |
| | GK | Mohamad Hassouni | | (Syrian Football Association) Al-Ittihad Ahli |
| | DF | Al Mekdad Ahmad | | (Syrian Football Association) Jableh |
| | DF | Ousama Al Jiroudi | | |
| | DF | Abdulrahman Al Arjah | | (Syrian Football Association) Al-Karamah |
| | DF | Mahmoud Nayef | | (Syrian Football Association) Al-Ittihad Ahli |
| | DF | Ali Al Rina | | (Football Association of Singapore) Lion City Sailors |
| | DF | Khaled Al Hajja | | (Syrian Football Association) Al-Karamah |
| | MF | Anas Dahhan | | (Syrian Football Association) Al-Ittihad Ahli |
| | MF | Ayham Kranbeh | | |
| | MF | Mahmoud Al Aswad | | (Syrian Football Association) Al-Karamah |
| | MF | Ahmad Soufi | | (Syrian Football Association) Hutteen |
| | MF | Ahmad Al Kalou | | (Syrian Football Association) Al-Ittihad Ahli |
| | MF | Mahmoud Al Omar | | (Syrian Football Association) Al-Ittihad Ahli |
| | MF | Aland Abdi | | (Royal Dutch Football Association) Roda JC U21 |
| | MF | Mahmoud Mhanna | | (Syrian Football Association) Jableh |
| | MF | Mohamad Al Sarakbi | | (Syrian Football Association) Al-Karamah |
| | MF | Can Yahya Moustfa | | (German Football Association) Energie Cottbus |
| | MF | Hasan Dahhan | | (Syrian Football Association) Al-Ittihad Ahli |
| | MF | Mohamad Asaad | | (Lebanese Football Association) Shabab Baalbek |
| | FW | Mohammad Al Mustafa | | (Syrian Football Association) Al-Wathba |
| | FW | Abdulmalek Jubran | | |

=== Previous squads ===
Asian Games

- Football at the 2006 Asian Games squads
- Football at the 2018 Asian Games squads

AFC U-23 Championship

- 2013 AFC U-22 Championship squads
- 2016 AFC U-23 Championship squads
- 2018 AFC U-23 Championship squads
- 2020 AFC U-23 Championship squads

== Honours ==
=== Regional ===
- WAFF U-23 Championship

(silver) Runners-up (1): 2015
(bronze) Third place (2): 2021, 2022

=== Arab ===
- Arab Games

(silver) Runners-up (1): 2023

== See also ==
- Syria national football team
- Syria national under-20 football team
- Syria national under-17 football team
- Syrian Football Association
- Football in Syria
