= Ziyad Al-Johani =

Saudi Arabian footballer

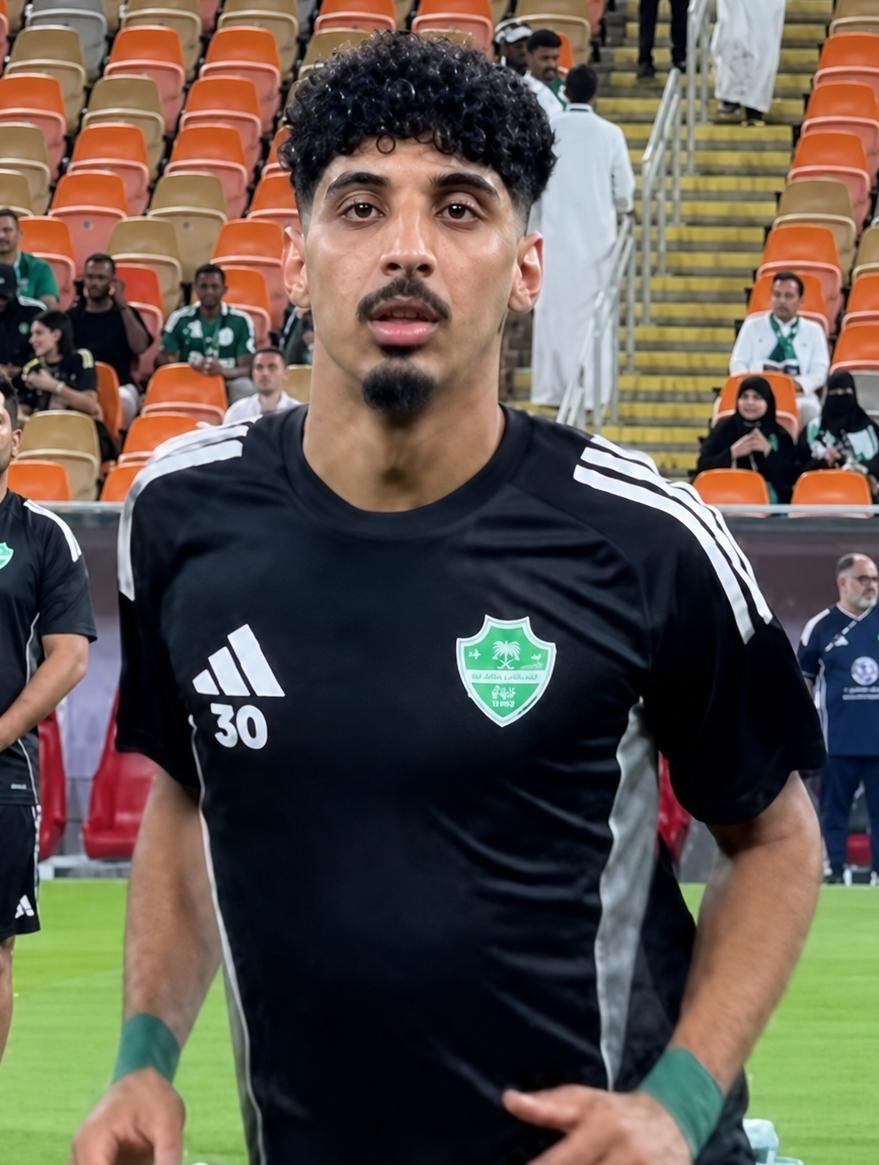
- Al-Johani with Al-Ahli in 2026

Personal information
- Full name: Ziyad Mubarak Eid Al-Marwani Al-Johani
- Date of birth: 11 November 2001 (age 25)
- Place of birth: Jeddah, Saudi Arabia
- Height: 1.80 m (5 ft 11 in)
- Position: Midfielder

Team information
- Current team: Al-Ahli
- Number: 30

Youth career
- Al-Ahli

Senior career*
Years	Team	Apps	(Gls)
2020–	Al-Ahli	119	(7)

International career^{‡}
2019–2021	Saudi Arabia U20		
2021–	Saudi Arabia U23		
2025–	Saudi Arabia	14	(0)
Medal record
Men's football
Representing Saudi Arabia
Islamic Solidarity Games
Silver medal – second place	2021 Konya
- * Club domestic league appearances and goals as of 20 November 2026 ‡ National team caps and goals as of 17 November 2026

Ziyad Mubarak Eid Al-Marwani Al-Johani (Arabic: زياد مبارك المرواني الجهني; born 11 November 2001) is a Saudi Arabian professional footballer who plays as a midfielder for Al-Ahli and the Saudi Arabia national team.

== Career ==
Al-Johani started his career at the youth teams of Al-Ahli. He was first called up to the first team after the 2019–20 season resumed following the COVID-19 pandemic. He signed his first professional contract for the club on 8 August 2020. He was then named on the bench for the first time in the derby match against Al-Ittihad a day later. He made his first-team on 30 May 2021 in the final league match of the season against Al-Ettifaq. On 24 July 2022, Al-Johani renewed his contract with Al-Ahli until the end of the 2025–26 season.

== International career ==
In June 2023, he took part in the Maurice Revello Tournament in France with Saudi Arabia.

On 31 May 2026, he was named in the 26-man squad for the 2026 FIFA World Cup.

== Career statistics ==
=== Club ===
As of 27 May 2024

Club	Season	League		King Cup		Asia		Other		Total	
Club	Season	Apps	Goals	Apps	Goals	Apps	Goals	Apps	Goals	Apps	Goals
Al-Ahli	2020–21	1	0	0	0	0	0	—		1	0
Al-Ahli	2021–22	10	0	0	0	—		—		10	0
Al-Ahli	2022–23	22	2	—		—		—		22	2
Al-Ahli	2023–24	22	2	2	0	—		—		24	2
Al-Ahli	Total	55	4	2	0	0	0	0	0	57	4
Career totals		55	4	2	0	0	0	0	0	57	4

== Honours ==
=== Club ===
Al-Ahli

- Saudi First Division League: 2022–23
- Saudi Super Cup: 2025
- AFC Champions League Elite: 2024–25, 2025–26

=== International ===
Saudi Arabia U23

- AFC U-23 Asian Cup: 2022
- WAFF U-23 Championship: 2022
