= Hozan Osman =

Syrian footballer

Personal information
- Date of birth: 16 May 2003 (age 23)
- Place of birth: Arnhem, Netherlands
- Height: 1.78 m (5 ft 10 in)
- Position: Winger

Team information
- Current team: Paradiso
- Number: 18

Youth career
- 2009–2019: ESA Rijkerswoerd
- 2019–2023: De Graafschap
- 2024–2025: NEC

Senior career*
Years	Team	Apps	(Gls)
2025–	Paradiso	3	(3)

International career^{‡}
2022–2023	Syria U20	7	(4)
2022–	Syria	1	(0)
- * Club domestic league appearances and goals as of 26 June 2026 ‡ National team caps and goals as of 19:31, 22 November 2022 (UTC)

Hozan Osman (Arabic: هوزان عثمان; born 16 May 2003) is a professional footballer who plays as a winger for the Swiss club Paradiso. Born in Netherlands he plays for the Syria national team.

== Career ==
Osman began playing youth football in his local Arnhem at the age of 4 with ESA Rijkerswoerd. He moved to the youth academy of De Graafschap in 2019. He was promoted to De Graafschap U21 side in 2022.

== International career ==
Born in Arnhem, Osman is of Syrian descent . He represented the Syria U20s for the 2022 WAFF U-23 Championship. He debuted with the senior Syria national team in a friendly game with Venezuela in November 2022.
