= Bandar Al Salamah =

Kuwaiti footballer

Bandar Al Salamah Al Mutairi
Personal information
- Full name: Bandar Al Salamah Al Mutairi
- Date of birth: 28 October 2002 (age 24)
- Place of birth: Kuwait
- Height: 1.79 m (5 ft 10 in)
- Position: Attacking midfielder

Team information
- Current team: Al-Arabi
- Number: 10

Youth career
- Al-Arabi

Senior career*
Years	Team	Apps	(Gls)
2019–	Al-Arabi	20	(7)

International career^{‡}
2021–	Kuwait	8	(0)
- * Club domestic league appearances and goals as of 7 June 2021 ‡ National team caps and goals as of 19 January 2024

Bandar Al Salamah Al Mutairi (Arabic: بَنْدَر السَّلَامَة الْمُطَيْرِيّ; born 28 October 2002) is a Kuwaiti professional soccer player who plays as an attacking midfielder for Al-Arabi.
