= Waleed Al-Hubaishi =

Yemeni footballer

Personal information
- Full name: Waleed Mohammed Hasan Al-Hubaishi
- Date of birth: 2 January 1993 (age 33)
- Place of birth: Yemen
- Height: 1.62 m (5 ft 4 in)
- Position: Defender

Team information
- Current team: Al-Saqr SC

Senior career*
Years	Team	Apps	(Gls)
2013	Al-Ahli Taizz S.C.		
2014–	Al-Saqr SC		

International career^{‡}
2014–	Yemen	6	(0)
- * Club domestic league appearances and goals as of 16:45, 6 April 2015 (UTC) ‡ National team caps and goals as of 16:45, 6 April 2015 (UTC)

Waleed Al-Hubaishi (born 2 January 1993) is a Yemeni footballer who plays for Al-Saqr SC, a football club based in Taiz, Yemen.

== Honours ==
Al-Ahli Taizz S.C.

Runners-up

- Yemeni Super Cup: 2013
