= 2015 WAFF U-23 Championship =

Tournament details
- Host country: Qatar
- Dates: 30 September – 14 October
- Teams: 10 (from 1 confederation)
- Venue: 1 (in 1 host city)

Final positions
- Champions: Iran (1st title)
- Runners-up: Syria
- Third place: Qatar
- Fourth place: Yemen

Tournament statistics
- Matches played: 16
- Goals scored: 49 (3.06 per match)
- Attendance: 7,550 (472 per match)
- Top scorer: (Qatar) Akram Afif (4 goals)
- Best player: (Iran) Amir Arsalan Motahari

The 2015 WAFF U-23 Championship took place in Doha, Qatar for the first time. Ten nations took part. The competition was held in Qatar from 30 September to 14 October with the draw for the tournament on 6 September 2015. Iran won the title after they defeated Syria in the final. This was Iran's last WAFF competition before joining the Central Asian Football Association.

The competition was used as a warm up for the 2016 AFC U-23 Championship which is also to be held in Qatar. This competition in turn is used as qualification for the Olympics football tournament of which these sides participating in the WAFF championship were eligible for.

== Teams ==
=== Squads ===
Each team had to register a squad of up to 23 players, three of whom must be goalkeepers.

== Venues ==
| Doha | Location of the host cities of the 2015 WAFF U-23 Championship. |
|---|---|
| Abdullah bin Khalifa Stadium (Lekhwiya SC stadium) | Location of the host cities of the 2015 WAFF U-23 Championship. |
| Capacity: 12,000 | Location of the host cities of the 2015 WAFF U-23 Championship. |

== Group stage ==
Legend
Advanced to the semifinals

- All times listed are (UTC+3)

=== Group A ===
| Team | Pld | W | D | L | GF | GA | GD | Pts |
|---|---|---|---|---|---|---|---|---|
| Qatar | 3 | 2 | 1 | 0 | 5 | 1 | +4 | 7 |
| Yemen | 3 | 1 | 1 | 1 | 4 | 4 | 0 | 4 |
| Palestine | 3 | 1 | 0 | 2 | 2 | 6 | −4 | 3 |
| Jordan | 3 | 1 | 0 | 2 | 4 | 4 | 0 | 3 |

30 September 2015
16:30

| Jordan | 3–1 | Yemen |
|---|---|---|
| Faisal 71'; Hisham 74', 77' | report | Al-Hubaishi 90+3' |

Abdullah bin Khalifa Stadium, Doha
Attendance: 150
Referee: Safwan Othman (Syria)
30 September 2015
19:30

| Qatar | 3–0 | Palestine |
|---|---|---|
| Ali 22'; Sanhaji 58'; Afif 90+3' (pen.) | report |

Abdullah bin Khalifa Stadium, Doha
Attendance: 700
Referee: Payam Heidari (Iran)

3 October 2015
16:30

| Palestine | 1–3 | Yemen |
|---|---|---|
| Batran 88' | report | Al-Hubaishi 15', 44'; Abdullah 24' |

Abdullah bin Khalifa Stadium, Doha
Attendance: 500
Referee: Mihail Litvinov (Turkmenistan)
3 October 2015
19:30

| Qatar | 2–1 | Jordan |
|---|---|---|
| Afif 21', 28' (pen.) | report | Hisham 29' |

Abdullah bin Khalifa Stadium, Doha
Attendance: 500
Referee: Haitham Mohammed Ali (Iraq)

6 October 2015
16:30

| Jordan | 0–1 | Palestine |
|---|---|---|
| | report | Batran 22' |

Abdullah bin Khalifa Stadium, Doha
Attendance: 200
Referee: Nasrullo Kabirov (Tajikistan)
6 October 2015
19:30

| Qatar | 0–0 | Yemen |
|---|---|---|
| | report |

Abdullah bin Khalifa Stadium, Doha
Attendance: 800
Referee: Saleh Al-Hetlol (Saudi Arabia)

=== Group B ===
| Team | Pld | W | D | L | GF | GA | GD | Pts |
|---|---|---|---|---|---|---|---|---|
| Iran | 2 | 1 | 1 | 0 | 4 | 2 | +2 | 4 |
| Saudi Arabia | 2 | 1 | 1 | 0 | 5 | 4 | +1 | 4 |
| Bahrain | 2 | 0 | 0 | 2 | 2 | 5 | −3 | 0 |

1 October 2015
16:30

| Iran | 2–0 | Bahrain |
|---|---|---|
| Cheshmi 29'; Fazeli 41' | Report |

Abdullah bin Khalifa Stadium, Doha
Attendance: 700
Referee: Omar Mohamed Al Ali (United Arab Emirates)

4 October 2015
16:30

| Iran | 2–2 | Saudi Arabia |
|---|---|---|
| Motahari 8', 16' | Report | Madou 18' (pen.); Al-Sulayhem 79' |

Abdullah bin Khalifa Stadium, Doha
Attendance: 500
Referee: Jawad Assi (Palestine)

7 October 2015
16:30

| Saudi Arabia | 3–2 | Bahrain |
|---|---|---|
| Al-Ghamdi 34'; Al-Sulayhem 80'; Madou 90+1' (pen.) | Report | Abdulrasool 83' (pen.); Hasan 90+3' |

Abdullah bin Khalifa Stadium, Doha
Attendance: 500

=== Group C ===
| Team | Pld | W | D | L | GF | GA | GD | Pts |
|---|---|---|---|---|---|---|---|---|
| Syria | 2 | 2 | 0 | 0 | 4 | 2 | +2 | 6 |
| United Arab Emirates | 2 | 1 | 0 | 1 | 5 | 5 | 0 | 3 |
| Oman | 2 | 0 | 0 | 2 | 4 | 6 | −2 | 0 |

1 October 2015
19:30

| Syria | 2–1 | United Arab Emirates |
|---|---|---|
| Nakdali 17'; Al Bahr 23' | Report | Mubarak 58' |

Abdullah bin Khalifa Stadium, Doha
Attendance: 500
Referee: Saleh Al-Hetlol (Saudi Arabia)

4 October 2015
19:30

| United Arab Emirates | 4–3 | Oman |
|---|---|---|
| Khameis 15'; Khalfan 22'; Saif 86'; Rabee 90+6' | Report | Saleem 1'; Al Hamdani 82' (pen.); Taaib 90+4' |

Abdullah bin Khalifa Stadium, Doha
Attendance: 300
Referee: Mongkolchai Pechsri (Thailand)

7 October 2015
19:30

| Oman | 1–2 | Syria |
|---|---|---|
| Al Siyabi 33' | Report | Nakdali 52', 53' |

Abdullah bin Khalifa Stadium, Doha
Attendance: 500

=== Ranking of second-placed teams ===
The best runner-up across all groups advance to semifinal. The results against the fourth-placed team are not counted when determining the ranking of the runner-up team.

| Team | Pld | W | D | L | GF | GA | GD | Pts |
|---|---|---|---|---|---|---|---|---|
| Yemen | 2 | 1 | 1 | 0 | 3 | 1 | +2 | 4 |
| Saudi Arabia | 2 | 1 | 1 | 0 | 5 | 4 | +1 | 4 |
| United Arab Emirates | 2 | 1 | 0 | 1 | 5 | 5 | 0 | 3 |

== Knockout stage ==
=== Semi-finals ===
10 October 2015
16:30

| Qatar | 0–2 | Syria |
|---|---|---|
| | Report | Mobayed 47'; Al Shami 90+5' |

Abdullah bin Khalifa Stadium, Doha
Attendance: 1,700
Referee: Haitham Mohammed Ali (Iraq)

10 October 2015
20:15

| Iran | 2–1 | Yemen |
|---|---|---|
| Mohammadi 9'; Daneshgar 47' | Report | Al-Jarshi 52' |

Abdullah bin Khalifa Stadium, Doha
Attendance: 1,000
Referee: Jawad Assi (Palestine)

=== Third place ===
14 October 2015
16:30

| Qatar | 3–0 | Yemen |
|---|---|---|
| Alaa 19'; Afif 68'; Sanhaji 90+1' | Report |

Abdullah bin Khalifa Stadium, Doha
Attendance: 700
Referee: Nasrullo Kabirov (Tajikistan)

=== Final ===
14 October 2015
20:00

| Syria | 0–2 | Iran |
|---|---|---|
| | Report | Naghizadeh 58'; Motahari 81' |

Abdullah bin Khalifa Stadium, Doha
Attendance: 1,700
Referee: Mongkolchai Pechsri (Thailand)

=== Winners ===
2015 WAFF U-23 Championship winners

Iran
1st title

== Final standing ==
| Rank | Team |
|---|---|
| 1st place, gold medalist(s) | Iran |
| 2nd place, silver medalist(s) | Syria |
| 3rd place, bronze medalist(s) | Qatar |
| 4 | Yemen |
| 5 | Saudi Arabia |
| 6 | United Arab Emirates |
| 7 | Palestine |
| 8 | Jordan |
| 9 | Oman |
| 10 | Bahrain |

== Player awards ==
- Best Player: (Iran) Amir Arsalan Motahari
- Top Scorer: (Qatar) Akram Afif
- Best Goalkeeper: (Iran) Mohammadreza Akhbari

== Goalscorers ==
4 goals

- (Qatar) Akram Afif

3 goals

- (Iran) Amir Arsalan Motahari
- (Jordan) Ahmed Hisham
- (Syria) Nasouh Al Nakdali
- (Yemen) Waleed Al-Hubaishi

2 goals

- (Palestine) Islam Batran
- (Qatar) Hamza Sanhaji
- (Saudi Arabia) Abdulla Madou
- (Saudi Arabia) Abdulmajeed Al-Sulayhem

1 goal

- (Bahrain) Abdula Ali Hasan
- (Bahrain) Ali Abdulrasool
- (Iran) Hossein Fazeli
- (Iran) Mehrdad Mohammadi
- (Iran) Roozbeh Cheshmi
- (Iran) Alireza Naghizadeh
- (Iran) Mohammad Daneshgar
- (Jordan) Baha' Faisal
- (Oman) Marwan Taaib
- (Oman) Khalid Al Hamdani
- (Oman) Jameel Saleem
- (Oman) Ahmed Al Siyabi
- (Qatar) Almoez Ali
- (Qatar) Ahmed Alaaeldin
- (Saudi Arabia) Raed Al-Ghamdi
- (Syria) Mahmoud Al Bahr
- (Syria) Abdullah Al Shami
- (Syria) Khaled Mobayed
- (United Arab Emirates) Khalifa Mubarak
- (United Arab Emirates) Ebraheim Khameis
- (United Arab Emirates) Saif Khalfan
- (United Arab Emirates) Ahmed Rabee
- (United Arab Emirates) Sultan Saif
- (Yemen) Ahmed Abdullah
- (Yemen) Abdulmuain Al-Jarshi
