= Football at the 2023 Arab Games – squads =

Below are the squads for the Football at the 2023 Arab Games, hosted by Algeria, taking place between 2 and 14 July 2023.

== Group A ==
=== Algeria ===
Coach: (Algeria) Rachid Aït-Mohamed

| No. | Pos. | Player | Date of birth (age) | Club |
|---|---|---|---|---|
| 1 | GK | Soufiane Abed | 13 May 2000 (aged 23) | (Algerian Football Federation) CS Constantine |
| 16 | GK | Redouane Maachou (captain) | 4 February 2001 (aged 22) | (Algerian Football Federation) USM Bel Abbès |
| 23 | GK | Hamza Boualem | 20 September 2004 (aged 18) | (Algerian Football Federation) USM Alger |
| 2 | DF | Mohamed Imad Reguieg | 2 June 2002 (aged 21) | (Algerian Football Federation) MC Oran |
| 3 | DF | Abdelkader Menezla | 6 January 2001 (aged 22) | (Algerian Football Federation) MC Alger |
| 4 | DF | Abdessamed Bounacer | 11 December 2004 (aged 18) | (Algerian Football Federation) USM Alger |
| 5 | DF | Abderrahim Hamra | 21 June 1997 (aged 26) | (Algerian Football Federation) ASO Chlef |
| 12 | DF | Fares Nechat Djabri | 25 May 2001 (aged 22) | (Algerian Football Federation) JS Kabylie |
| 17 | DF | Yacine Zeghad | 29 November 2001 (aged 21) | (Algerian Football Federation) NC Magra |
| 22 | DF | Mohamed Ayoub Zendaoui | 2 May 2002 (aged 21) | (Algerian Football Federation) Paradou AC |
| 6 | MF | Mahdi Slamani | 5 July 2003 (aged 19) | (Algerian Football Federation) MC Alger |
| 7 | MF | Nacer Marouane Benzid | 20 February 2001 (aged 22) | (Algerian Football Federation) MC El Bayadh |
| 8 | MF | Mohamed Kerroum | 27 June 2000 (aged 23) | (Algerian Football Federation) Paradou AC |
| 10 | MF | Akram Bouras | 23 February 2002 (aged 21) | (Algerian Football Federation) CR Belouizdad |
| 14 | MF | Islam Zermane | 23 February 2002 (aged 21) | (Algerian Football Federation) CS Constantine |
| 18 | MF | Oussama Benhaoua | 10 April 2002 (aged 21) | (Algerian Football Federation) MC Alger |
| 19 | MF | Mohamed Ait El Hadj | 22 March 2002 (aged 21) | (Algerian Football Federation) USM Alger |
| 20 | MF | Belhadj Chekal Affari | 5 March 2003 (aged 20) | (Algerian Football Federation) CS Constantine |
| 9 | FW | Mohamed Djenidi | 10 July 2002 (aged 20) | (Algerian Football Federation) USM Alger |
| 11 | FW | Massinissa Nait Salem | 30 April 2001 (aged 22) | (Algerian Football Federation) JS Kabylie |
| 13 | FW | Youcef Aouissi | 2 January 2003 (aged 20) | (Algerian Football Federation) ES Setif |
| 15 | FW | Mounder Temine | 15 September 2001 (aged 21) | (Algerian Football Federation) CS Constantine |
| 21 | FW | Boualem Sryer | 8 June 2001 (aged 22) | (Algerian Football Federation) ASO Chlef |

=== Oman ===
Coach: (Oman) Akram Habreesh

| No. | Pos. | Player | Date of birth (age) | Club |
|---|---|---|---|---|
| | GK | Maitham Al Ajmi | 22 May 2002 (aged 21) | (Oman Football Association) Al-Ittihad |
| | GK | Salem Al Dawodi | | (Oman Football Association) Al-Orouba |
| | GK | Mazen Al Harrasi | 28 January 2003 (aged 20) | (Oman Football Association) Muscat |
| | DF | Ayman Karim Al-Nabhani | 27 July 2003 (aged 19) | (Oman Football Association) Al-Hamra |
| | DF | Basel Al Jaberi | | (Oman Football Association) Oman |
| | DF | Abdullah Al-Fleti | | (Oman Football Association) Al-Shabab |
| | DF | Khalid Al-Ghatrifi | | (Oman Football Association) Fanja |
| | MF | Nasser Al-Rawahi | 26 June 2001 (aged 22) | (Oman Football Association) Suwaiq |
| | MF | Ali Hassan Al-Bulushi | 2 May 2004 (aged 19) | (Oman Football Association) Oman |
| | MF | Ahad Al-Mashaikhi | 30 May 2003 (aged 20) | (Oman Football Association) Muscat |
| | MF | Osama Al-Hadabi | 10 September 2002 (aged 20) | (United States Soccer Federation) Omaha Mavericks |
| | MF | Omran Al Nomani | | |
| | MF | Abdul Hafez Al-Mukhaini | | (Oman Football Association) Al-Orouba |
| | MF | Saeed Al-Salami | 6 November 2001 (aged 21) | (Oman Football Association) Muscat |
| | MF | Abdul Majeed Al-Balushi | 15 January 2004 (aged 19) | (Oman Football Association) Oman |
| | MF | Mohammed Beit Subei | 9 November 2004 (aged 18) | (Oman Football Association) Salalah |
| | MF | Mohammed Al-Hinai | | (Oman Football Association) Al-Nahda |
| | FW | Al Faraj Al Kiyomi | | (Oman Football Association) Al-Bashaer |
| | FW | Salem Al-Abdulsalam | | (Oman Football Association) Dhofar |
| | FW | Omar Al-Salti | 17 February 2002 (aged 21) | (Oman Football Association) Al-Orouba |
| | FW | Yusuf Al-Ghaliani | | (Oman Football Association) Al-Orouba |
| | FW | Asad Al-Balushi | | (Oman Football Association) Ahli Sidab |
| | FW | Nibras Al-Maashari | 1 May 2002 (aged 21) | (Oman Football Association) Muscat |

=== Lebanon ===
Lebanon announced their squad on 29 June 2023.

Coach: (Portugal) Miguel Moreira

| No. | Pos. | Player | Date of birth (age) | Club |
|---|---|---|---|---|
| | GK | Hadi Kanj | 14 September 2001 (aged 21) | (Lebanese Football Association) Al-Ansar |
| | GK | Rami Mjalli | 15 October 2003 (aged 19) | (Swiss Football Association) Chênois |
| | GK | Anthony Maassry | 10 February 2004 (aged 19) | (French Football Federation) Montfermeil |
| | DF | Sajed Amhaz | 19 February 2002 (aged 21) | (Lebanese Football Association) Chabab Ghazieh |
| | DF | Ibrahim Chami | 12 December 2003 (aged 19) | (Canadian Soccer Association) FC Laval |
| | DF | Ali Hakim | 10 June 2003 (aged 20) | (Lebanese Football Association) Akhaa Ahli Aley |
| | DF | Ali Alrida Ismail | 8 July 2003 (aged 19) | (Lebanese Football Association) Nejmeh |
| | DF | Alex El Ratel | 17 May 2002 (aged 21) | (Lebanese Football Association) Al-Ansar |
| | DF | Mohamad Safwan | 10 March 2003 (aged 20) | (Lebanese Football Association) Nejmeh |
| | MF | Hasan Farhat | 21 September 2004 (aged 18) | (Lebanese Football Association) Al-Ahed |
| | MF | Mohamad Ghamlouch | 19 May 2003 (aged 20) | (Lebanese Football Association) Nejmeh |
| | MF | Mohamad Haidar | 2 January 2001 (aged 22) | (Lebanese Football Association) Shabab Al-Sahel |
| | MF | Mohammad Al Massri | 22 June 2001 (aged 22) | (Lebanese Football Association) Al-Ansar |
| | MF | Karim Mekkaoui | 19 April 2001 (aged 22) | (Cyprus Football Association) Ayia Napa |
| | MF | Hussein Saleh | 26 February 2002 (aged 21) | (Lebanese Football Association) Racing Beirut |
| | FW | Samuel Harb | 18 April 2002 (aged 21) | (Portuguese Football Federation) Alverca B |
| | FW | Ali Kassas | 25 May 2003 (aged 20) | (Lebanese Football Association) Nejmeh |
| | FW | Said Saad | 21 May 2002 (aged 21) | (Lebanese Football Association) Shabab Al-Sahel |
| | FW | Omar Sabbagh | 30 October 2002 (aged 20) | (United States Soccer Federation) UC San Diego Tritons |
| | FW | Mohamed Mahdi Sabbah | 20 May 2002 (aged 21) | Free agent |
| | FW | Mohammad Serdah | 13 June 2003 (aged 20) | (Lebanese Football Association) Chabab Ghazieh |

=== Sudan ===
Coach: (France) Mounir Lehbab

| No. | Pos. | Player | Date of birth (age) | Club |
|---|---|---|---|---|
| 1 | GK | Mohamed Madani Al-Beshara | 16 October 2005 (aged 17) | (Sudan Football Association) Al-Merrikh |
| 3 | DF | Mohamed Hassoun Babeker | 16 October 2003 (aged 19) | |
| 4 | DF | Abdelsamat Omar Ahmed | 4 May 2005 (aged 18) | (Sudan Football Association) Al-Hilal |
| 6 | MF | Elborae Gamal Elhag | 18 January 2005 (aged 18) | (Sudan Football Association) Al-Ahli Merowe |
| 7 | | Abaker Adam | 1 January 2004 (aged 19) | (Sudan Football Association) Al-Merrikh |
| 9 | FW | Ali Abdalla Hamadalnile Ali | 17 March 2003 (aged 20) | (Sudan Football Association) Hay Al-Wady |
| 10 | MF | Al-Jezoli Nouh (c) | 24 October 2002 (aged 20) | (Sudan Football Association) Al-Merrikh |
| 11 | MF | Suleiman Ezzalla Hamouda | 10 February 2005 (aged 18) | (Sudan Football Association) Al-Hilal |
| 12 | MF | Abdalla Osman Idris Mohamed | 23 July 2006 (aged 16) | |
| 14 | FW | Sheikh-Aldeen Abdel-Mahmoud | 28 March 2002 (aged 21) | |
| 17 | DF | Marwan Taha Salih | 10 January 2006 (aged 17) | |
| 18 | DF | Mosab Abdallah Mahmoud Eisa | 2 May 2004 (aged 19) | |
| 19 | FW | Mazin Fadhl Al-Bahli Tawer | 26 July 2008 (aged 14) | |
| 21 | FW | Mohamed Ibrahim Mohamed | 1 January 2005 (aged 18) | |
| 22 | MF | Zahir Toto Galis Kgak | 14 January 2007 (aged 16) | (Sudan Football Association) Al-Shorta Algadarf |
| | MF | Zeryab Yousef Dongs | 12 July 2004 (aged 18) | (Sudan Football Association) Al-Hilal |
| | | Esmat Hassab Al-Bagi | 10 September 2002 (aged 20) | |
| | | Muhanad Kamal Mohamed | 20 February 2004 (aged 19) | |
| | | Maysara Abdel-Aziz | 9 November 2006 (aged 16) | (Sudan Football Association) Hay El-Arab |

== Group B ==
=== Saudi Arabia ===
Coach: (Brazil) Marcos Soares

| No. | Pos. | Player | Date of birth (age) | Club |
|---|---|---|---|---|
| 1 | GK | Bilal Al-Dawaa | 12 June 2004 (aged 19) | (Saudi Arabian Football Federation) Ettifaq |
| 2 | DF | Ahmed Al-Jelidan | 8 March 2004 (aged 19) | (Saudi Arabian Football Federation) Al-Fateh |
| 3 | DF | Saleh Barnawi | 8 February 2007 (aged 16) | (Saudi Arabian Football Federation) Al-Hilal |
| 4 | DF | Mohammed Baker | 8 April 2004 (aged 19) | (Saudi Arabian Football Federation) Al-Ahli |
| 5 | DF | Mohammed Barnawi | 7 August 2005 (aged 17) | (Saudi Arabian Football Federation) Al-Hilal |
| 6 | DF | Waleed Ayash | 22 April 2004 (aged 19) | (Saudi Arabian Football Federation) Al-Nassr |
| 7 | MF | Ziyad Al-Ghamdi | 16 February 2005 (aged 18) | (Saudi Arabian Football Federation) Al-Ahli |
| 8 | MF | Abdullah Al-Zaid | 8 January 2004 (aged 19) | (Saudi Arabian Football Federation) Al-Hilal |
| 9 | FW | Abdulaziz Al-Othman | 3 January 2004 (aged 19) | (Saudi Arabian Football Federation) Al-Qadsiah |
| 10 | MF | Suhaib Al-Zaid | 12 August 2004 (aged 18) | (Saudi Arabian Football Federation) Al-Hilal |
| 14 | DF | Meshal Alaeli | 17 June 2004 (aged 19) | (Saudi Arabian Football Federation) Ettifaq |
| 15 | MF | Ahmed Al-Baddah | 3 June 2004 (aged 19) | (Saudi Arabian Football Federation) Al-Faisaly |
| 16 | MF | Abbas Al-Hassan | 22 February 2004 (aged 19) | (Saudi Arabian Football Federation) Al-Fateh |
| 17 | FW | Ammar Al-Khaibari | 3 September 2004 (aged 18) | (Saudi Arabian Football Federation) Al-Shabab |
| 18 | MF | Mohammed Al-Zaid | 8 January 2004 (aged 19) | (Saudi Arabian Football Federation) Al-Hilal |
| 19 | MF | Younes Al Shanqeeti | 6 January 2004 (aged 19) | (Saudi Arabian Football Federation) Al-Hilal |
| 20 | MF | Faisal Al-Abdulwahed | 29 December 2004 (aged 18) | (Saudi Arabian Football Federation) Al-Fateh |
| 21 | GK | Muhannad Al-Yahya | 19 September 2004 (aged 18) | (Saudi Arabian Football Federation) Al-Fateh |
| 22 | GK | Hamed Al-Shanqiti | 26 April 2005 (aged 18) | (Saudi Arabian Football Federation) Al-Shabab |
| 23 | MF | Marwan Al-Sahafi | 17 February 2004 (aged 19) | (Saudi Arabian Football Federation) Al-Ittihad |
| 24 | FW | Majed Khalifa | 2 June 2004 (aged 19) | (Saudi Arabian Football Federation) Al-Ahli |
| 26 | MF | Abdullah Al-Dawsari | 3 November 2004 (aged 18) | (Saudi Arabian Football Federation) Al-Hilal |
| | DF | Khaled Asiri | 27 November 2004 (aged 18) | (Saudi Arabian Football Federation) Al-Shabab |

=== Syria ===
Coach: (Egypt) Tamer Hasan

=== Palestine ===
Palestine announced their squad on 1 July 2023.

Coach: (Palestine) Ihab Abu Jazar

| No. | Pos. | Player | Date of birth (age) | Club |
|---|---|---|---|---|
| 1 | GK | Anwar Al-Aqraa | 30 June 2002 (aged 21) | (Palestinian Football Association) Islami Qalqilya |
| 2 | DF | Yazan Sharha | | (Palestinian Football Association) Thaqafi Tulkarem |
| 3 | MF | Ahmad Kallab | 8 November 2001 (aged 21) | (Palestinian Football Association) Ittihad Khanyounis |
| 4 | DF | Ali Rabei | 9 October 2002 (aged 20) | (Palestinian Football Association) Ahli Al-Khaleel |
| 5 | DF | Ibrahim Abu Ameer | 18 October 2002 (aged 20) | (Palestinian Football Association) Khadamat Rafah |
| 6 | MF | Qais Taha | 23 July 2003 (aged 19) | (Palestinian Football Association) Thaqafi Tulkarem |
| 7 | FW | Khaled Al-Nabris | 27 March 2003 (aged 20) | (Palestinian Football Association) Ittihad Khanyounis |
| 8 | MF | Muhannad Hassanein | 14 May 2003 (aged 20) | (Palestinian Football Association) Khadamat Rafah |
| 9 | MF | Zaid Qunbar | 4 September 2002 (aged 20) | (Palestinian Football Association) Jabal Al-Mukaber |
| 10 | FW | Anas Al-Khatib | 7 September 2001 (aged 21) | (Palestinian Football Association) Shabab Al-Dhahiriya |
| 11 | FW | Samer Zubaida | 26 April 2001 (aged 22) | (Palestinian Football Association) Hilal Al-Quds |
| 12 | DF | Omar Kayed | 18 July 2001 (aged 21) | (Lebanese Football Association) Tripoli |
| 13 | MF | Sadeq Obaid | 26 April 2002 (aged 21) | (Palestinian Football Association) Hilal Al-Quds |
| 15 | MF | Wajdi Nabhan | 27 July 2001 (aged 21) | (Palestinian Football Association) Shabab Al-Bireh Institute |
| 16 | GK | Mahdi Assi | 24 December 2004 (aged 18) | (Palestinian Football Association) Shabab Al-Bireh Institute |
| 17 | FW | Reebal Dahamshi | 8 June 2002 (aged 21) | (Israel Football Association) Abna Zafla |
| 18 | FW | Ahmed Daghim | 7 April 2001 (aged 22) | (Danish Football Association) B.93 |
| 19 | MF | Hamza Hussein | 2 May 2002 (aged 21) | (Lebanese Football Association) Al-Ansar |
| 20 | FW | Gibrán Haj Yousef | 27 January 2001 (aged 22) | (Venezuelan Football Federation) Mineros de Guayana |
| 21 | DF | Muhammad Abu Awwad | 24 March 2001 (aged 22) | (Palestinian Football Association) Shabab Alsamu |
| 22 | GK | Abdul Hadi Yassin | 1 May 2004 (aged 19) | (Israel Football Association) Bnei Sakhnin |
| 23 | DF | Amro Rezeq | 23 April 2003 (aged 20) | (Palestinian Football Association) Gaza Sports Club |

=== Mauritania ===
Mauritania announced their squad on 28 June 2023.

Coach: (Mauritania) Taleb Lemrabott

| No. | Pos. | Player | Date of birth (age) | Club |
|---|---|---|---|---|
| 1 | GK | Abderrahmane Sarr | 1 April 2005 (aged 18) | (Football Federation of the Islamic Republic of Mauritania) ASAC Concorde |
| | GK | Aly Keita | | (Football Federation of the Islamic Republic of Mauritania) Chemal FC |
| | GK | Mohamed El Mokhtar | 10 October 2002 (aged 20) | (Football Federation of the Islamic Republic of Mauritania) AS Douanes |
| | DF | Oumar Boushab | 20 June 2004 (aged 19) | (Football Federation of the Islamic Republic of Mauritania) AS Douanes |
| | DF | Mohamed Sarr | 28 October 2002 (aged 20) | (Football Federation of the Islamic Republic of Mauritania) Nouakchott Kings |
| | DF | Saïd Imigine | | (United Arab Emirates Football Association) Elite Falcons FC |
| | DF | Cheikh Baye | | (Football Federation of the Islamic Republic of Mauritania) Nouakchott Kings |
| | DF | Ramdane Zweide | 25 March 2001 (aged 22) | (Football Federation of the Islamic Republic of Mauritania) Nouakchott Kings |
| | DF | Mohamed Cissokho | | (Football Federation of the Islamic Republic of Mauritania) ASAC Concorde |
| | DF | El Mokhtar Bilal | 15 April 2001 (aged 22) | (Football Federation of the Islamic Republic of Mauritania) AS Douanes |
| | DF | Abou Sy | | (Football Federation of the Islamic Republic of Mauritania) Chemal FC |
| | MF | Issa Konaté | 31 December 2001 (aged 21) | (Football Federation of the Islamic Republic of Mauritania) ASAC Concorde |
| | MF | Oumar M’bareck | 15 March 2002 (aged 21) | (Football Federation of the Islamic Republic of Mauritania) FC Nouadhibou |
| | MF | Ely Bowba | | (Football Federation of the Islamic Republic of Mauritania) AS Douanes |
| | MF | Amar Haidara | 28 November 2003 (aged 19) | (Senegalese Football Federation) Diambars FC |
| | MF | Mamadou Ly | | (Senegalese Football Federation) Génération Foot |
| | MF | Mata Magassa | | (Football Federation of the Islamic Republic of Mauritania) AS Douanes |
| | MF | Eddey Sidi | 5 July 2003 (aged 19) | (Football Federation of the Islamic Republic of Mauritania) Chemal FC |
| | FW | Hmeyda El Wely | | (United Arab Emirates Football Association) Al Jazirah Al Hamra |
| | FW | Salem M’bareck | 6 March 2002 (aged 21) | (Football Federation of the Islamic Republic of Mauritania) AS Douanes |
| | FW | El Hassen Demba | | (Football Federation of the Islamic Republic of Mauritania) AS Douanes |
| | FW | Adama Diallo | | (Football Federation of the Islamic Republic of Mauritania) AS Garde Nationale |
| | FW | Cheikh Kamara | 23 June 2001 (aged 22) | (Football Federation of the Islamic Republic of Mauritania) FC Nouadhibou |
