= Lotfi Madjer =

Qatari footballer (born 2002)

Personal information
- Full name: Lotfi Rabah Madjer
- Date of birth: 22 March 2002 (age 24)
- Place of birth: Algeria
- Height: 1.76 m (5 ft 9 in)
- Position: Right winger

Team information
- Current team: Al Shahaniya (on loan from Al-Duhail)
- Number: 8

Youth career
- Aspire Academy
- –2019: Paradou AC
- 2019–: Al-Duhail

Senior career*
Years	Team	Apps	(Gls)
2019–	Al-Duhail	22	(0)
2024–	→ Al Shahaniya (loan)	38	(5)

International career
2020	Qatar U20		
2021–2024	Qatar U23	16	(3)
2023	Qatar Olympics	2	(0)
- * Club domestic league appearances and goals as of 09:01, 7 June 2026 (UTC)

Lotfi Rabah Madjer (Arabic: لطفي رابح ماجر; born 22 March 2002) is a professional footballer who plays as a right winger for Qatar Stars League side Al Shahaniya, on loan from Al-Duhail. Born in Algeria, he has represented Qatar at youth level.

== Early career ==
Born in Algeria, Madjer moved to Doha, Qatar when he was 8 months old and spent his entire childhood in the country. He started his youth career playing for the Aspire Academy, before returning to Algeria to join the youth side of Paradou AC. In 2019, he came back to Qatar and joined Al-Duhail.

== Club career ==
Madjer started his career at Al-Duhail. On 22 November 2020, Madjer made his professional debut for Al-Duhail against Al-Gharafa in the Pro League, replacing Mohammed Muntari.

== International career ==
In April 2024, Madjer was named in Qatar U23's squad for the 2024 AFC U-23 Asian Cup.

== Personal life ==
Madjer is the son of the former Algeria national team footballer Rabah Madjer.

== Career statistics ==
=== Club ===
As of 12 September 2023.

Club	Season	League			Cup		Continental		Other		Total	
Club	Season	Division	Apps	Goals	Apps	Goals	Apps	Goals	Apps	Goals	Apps	Goals
Al-Duhail	2019–20	QSL	0	0	3	0	0	0	0	0	3	0
Al-Duhail	2020–21	QSL	1	0	1	0	0	0	0	0	2	0
Al-Duhail	2021–22	QSL	5	0	0	0	0	0	0	0	5	0
Al-Duhail	2022–23	QSL	12	0	0	0	0	0	0	0	12	0
Al-Duhail	2023–24	QSL	0	0	0	0	0	0	0	0	0	0
Career total			18	0	4	0	0	0	0	0	22	0

== Honours ==
Al-Duhail

- Qatar Stars League: 2022-23
- Qatari Stars Cup: 2022-23
- Emir of Qatar Cup: 2022
- Qatar Cup: 2023
