= Diyab Taha =

Qatari footballer (born 2001)

Diyab Taha دياب طه
Personal information
- Full name: Diyab Haroon Taha
- Date of birth: 15 January 2001 (age 25)
- Place of birth: Qatar
- Position: Right back

Team information
- Current team: Umm Salal
- Number: 27

Youth career
- –2019: Aspire Academy
- 2019–2020: Al-Duhail

Senior career*
| Years | Team | Apps | (Gls) |
| 2020–2024 | Al-Duhail | 7 | (0) |
| 2021–2022 | → Al-Khor (loan) | 18 | (0) |
| 2023–2024 | → Al-Shamal (loan) | 1 | (0) |
| 2024–2025 | Qatar | 0 | (0) |
| 2025 | Al Bidda | 5 | (0) |
| 2025– | Umm Salal | 0 | (0) |

International career
- Qatar U20
- * Club domestic league appearances and goals

Diyab Haroon Taha (Arabic: دياب هارون طه; born 15 January 2001) is a Qatari footballer who plays as right back for Umm Salal.

== Career ==
Diyab started his career with Al-Duhail and is a product of the Al-Duhail's youth system. On 31 January 2021, he joined Al-Khor.
