= Ahmed Al-Ghamdi =

Saudi Arabian footballer (born 2001)

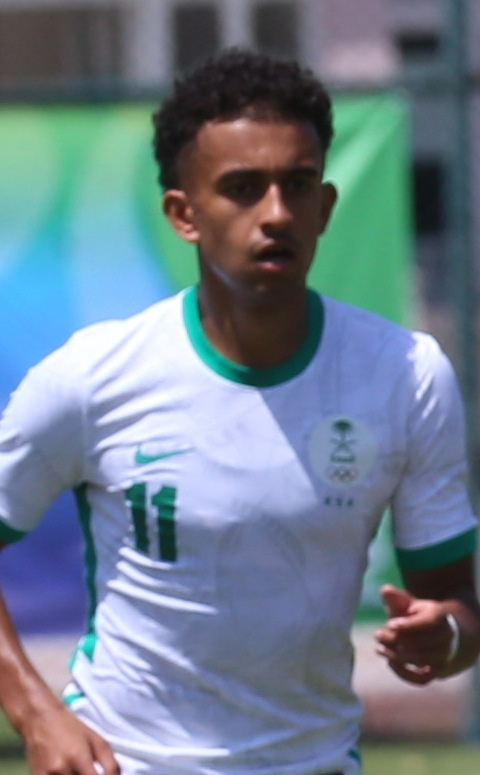
- Al-Ghamdi playing for Saudi Arabia U23 in 2022

Personal information
- Full name: Ahmed Mazen Ahmed Al-Hijazi Al-Ghamdi
- Date of birth: 21 September 2001 (age 25)
- Place of birth: Jeddah, Saudi Arabia
- Height: 1.77 m (5 ft 10 in)
- Position: Winger

Team information
- Current team: Al-Ittihad
- Number: 27

Youth career
- Blaise Academy
- Rino's Tigers

Senior career*
Years	Team	Apps	(Gls)
2019	Pacific FC	8	(1)
2020–2024	Al-Ettifaq	49	(1)
2024	→ Al-Ittihad (loan)	10	(2)
2024–	Al-Ittihad	38	(3)
2025	→ Neom (loan)	16	(2)

International career^{‡}
2019–2021	Saudi Arabia U20	4	(1)
2022–2024	Saudi Arabia U23	13	(5)
2023–	Saudi Arabia	5	(0)
Medal record
Men's football
Representing Saudi Arabia
Islamic Solidarity Games
Silver medal – second place	2021 Konya
- * Club domestic league appearances and goals as of 30 October 2026 ‡ National team caps and goals as of 17 November 2026

Ahmed Mazen Ahmed Al-Hijazi Al-Ghamdi (Arabic: أَحْمَد مَازِن أَحْمَد الْحِجَازِيّ الْغَامِدِيّ; born 21 September 2001) is a Saudi Arabian professional footballer who plays as a winger for Al-Ittihad and the Saudi Arabia national team.

== Early and personal life ==
Born in Jeddah, Saudi Arabia, Al-Ghamdi’s family moved to Vancouver, British Columbia when he was a year old. When he was 18, he was accepted into the University of British Columbia. In addition to his love for football, he also enjoys basketball, having played basketball for his high school team, which he attributed to have helped him to develop his football career.

== Club career ==
=== Early career ===
Before turning pro, Alghamdi spent several years with Blaise Soccer Elite Academy in Vancouver. Alghamdi joined Vancouver Metro Soccer League side Rino's Vancouver SC as a fourteen-year-old and played three seasons of senior amateur soccer with the club's Rino's Tigers team while playing with Blaise Academy in the summer.

=== Pacific FC ===
On 1 May 2019, Alghamdi made his professional debut for Canadian Premier League side Pacific FC, and was officially announced as a signing two days later. He scored his first professional goal on July 1 against Cavalry FC. On 23 January 2020, the club announced it would allow Alghamdi to pursue playing opportunities in Saudi Arabia.

=== Al-Ettifaq ===
In January 2020, Al-Ghamdi signed a five-year contract with Saudi Professional League side Al-Ettifaq. He made his debut for Al-Ettifaq against Al-Qadsiah on April 10, 2021. On 31 January 2022, Al-Ghamdi renewed his contract with Al-Ettifaq until the end of the 2026–27 season. On 21 May 2022, Al-Ghamdi scored his first goal for Al-Ettifaq in a 5–2 win against Al-Hazem.

==== Al-Ittihad (loan) ====
On 28 January 2024, Al-Ghamdi joined Al-Ittihad on a six-month loan. On 4 February 2024, Al-Ghamdi made his debut for Al-Ittihad as a 75th-minute substitute in a 4–0 win in the King Cup quarter-final match against Al-Faisaly. On 7 February 2024, Al-Ghamdi made his league debut in the 3–0 win against Al-Tai. On 16 March 2024, Al-Ghamdi made his first start as well as score his first goal for Al-Ittihad in the 4–2 win against Al-Fateh. Al-Ghamdi ended his loan spell at Al-Ittihad making 15 appearances in all competitions and scoring two goals as well as recording two assists.

=== Al-Ittihad ===
On 4 June 2024, Al-Ghamdi joined Al-Ittihad on a permanent deal.

==== Neom (loan) ====
On 30 January 2025, Al-Ghamdi joined Saudi First Division League club Neom on a six-month loan.

== International career ==
Born in Saudi Arabia and raised in Canada, Al-Ghamdi is a dual citizen and was eligible to play for the Saudi Arabia or Canada national team.

In July 2018, Al-Ghamdi was called up by the Saudi Arabia U-19 team for an evaluation camp ahead of the 2018 AFC U-19 Championship, but was not selected for the final squad. In July 2019, Alghamdi was called up by the Saudi Arabia U-20 team for a pair of friendlies against Bahrain and Tajikistan.

In November 2019, Al-Ghamdi was called up for the 2020 AFC U-19 Championship qualification tournament. On 6 November, he started and scored a penalty for Saudi Arabia in a 1–0 win over Afghanistan. On 8 November, he came on as a substitute in a 4–0 win over India.

Al-Ghamdi was called up to the Saudi Arabia U-23 team for the first time in 2022 for the 2022 AFC U-23 Asian Cup. He started in the final and scored the first goal in the 48' minute to give the falcons the lead, the match ended 2–0 and Saudi Arabia won their first AFC U-23 Asian Cup title.

== Career statistics ==
=== Club ===
As of match played 27 May 2025

Club	Season	League		King Cup		Asia		Other		Total	
Club	Season	Apps	Goals	Apps	Goals	Apps	Goals	Apps	Goals	Apps	Goals
Al-Ettifaq	2019–20	0	0	0	0	—		—		0	0
Al-Ettifaq	2020–21	1	0	0	0	—		—		1	0
Al-Ettifaq	2021–22	13	1	0	0	—		—		13	1
Al-Ettifaq	2022–23	24	0	1	0	—		—		25	0
Al-Ettifaq	2023–24	11	0	1	0	—		—		12	0
Al-Ettifaq	Total	49	1	2	0	0	0	0	0	51	1
Al-Ittihad (loan)	2023–24	10	2	2	0	3	0	0	0	15	2
Al-Ittihad	2024–25	2	0	2	0	—		—		4	0
Neom (loan)	2024–25	16	2	—		—		—		16	2
Career totals		77	5	6	0	3	0	0	0	86	5

== Honours ==
Saudi Arabia U23

- AFC U-23 Asian Cup: 2022
- WAFF U-23 Championship: 2022

Individual

- WAFF U-23 Championship Best Player: 2022
- Saudi Pro League Rising Star of the Month: March 2024
