= Mekki Tombari =

Qatari footballer (born 2001)

Personal information
- Full name: Mekki Mohsen Tombari
- Date of birth: 15 February 2001 (age 25)
- Place of birth: Qatar
- Position: Forward

Team information
- Current team: Al-Waab
- Number: 17

Youth career
- Aspire Academy

Senior career*
Years	Team	Apps	(Gls)
2019–2023	Al-Rayyan	7	(0)
2020	→ Umm Salal (loan)	4	(0)
2020–2022	→ Al-Kharaitiyat (loan)	-	(-)
2023–2024	Al-Salliya	7	(5)
2024–2025	Mesaimeer	10	(1)
2025–2026	Al-Khor	6	(0)
2026–	Al-Waab	0	(0)

International career
2019–	Qatar U20		
- * Club domestic league appearances and goals

Mekki Mohsen Tombari (born 15 February 2001) is a Qatari footballer who plays as a forward for Al-Waab.
