= Mohammed Maran =

Saudi association football player

Mohammed Maran محمد مران
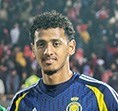
- Maran in 2025

Personal information
- Full name: Mohammed Khalil Maran
- Date of birth: 15 February 2001 (age 25)
- Place of birth: Sabya, Saudi Arabia
- Height: 1.75 m (5 ft 9 in)
- Position: Forward

Team information
- Current team: Al-Nassr
- Number: 16

Youth career
- 2019: Al-Amjad FC
- 2019–2021: Al-Nassr

Senior career*
Years	Team	Apps	(Gls)
2020–	Al-Nassr	39	(4)
2021–2022	→ Al-Tai (loan)	14	(0)

International career^{‡}
2019–2021	Saudi Arabia U20		
2021–	Saudi Arabia U23		
2023–	Saudi Arabia	8	(0)
Medal record
Men's football
Representing Saudi Arabia
AFC U-23 Asian Cup
Winner	2022 Uzbekistan
Islamic Solidarity Games
Runner-up	2021 Konya
WAFF U-23 Championship
Winner	2022 Saudi Arabia
- * Club domestic league appearances and goals as of 15 August 2026 ‡ National team caps and goals as of 15 October 2024

Mohammed Khalil Maran (Arabic: محمد خليل مران, born 15 February 2001) is a Saudi Arabian professional footballer who plays as a forward for Saudi Pro League club Al-Nassr and the Saudi Arabia national team.

== Career ==
Maran began his career at the youth team of Al-Amjad. He joined the youth team of Al-Nassr On 19 August 2019. On 11 January 2020, He was chosen to participate with the first team in Al-Nassr in the Al-Ittihad match . On 28 February 2021, Maran made his professional debut for Al-Nassr against Abha in the Pro League, replacing Pity Martínez. On 31 August 2021, Maran joined Al-Tai on loan.

== Career statistics ==
=== Club ===
As of 22 December 2024

Appearances and goals by club, season and competition
Club	Season	League			National Cup		Continental		Other		Total	
Club	Season	Division	Apps	Goals	Apps	Goals	Apps	Goals	Apps	Goals	Apps	Goals
Al Nassr	2019-20	Saudi Pro League	0	0	0	0	0	0	—		0	0
Al Nassr	2020-21	Saudi Pro League	5	0	0	0	4 (Note: Appearance(s) in AFC Champions League)	0	0	0	9	0
Al Nassr	2021-22	Saudi Pro League	0	0	—		—		—		0	0
Al Nassr	2022-23	Saudi Pro League	16	3	2	1	—		0	0	18	4
Al Nassr	2023-24	Saudi Pro League	4	0	1	1	2	0	0	0	7	1
Al Nassr	2024-25	Saudi Pro League	5	0	2	0	—		1 (Note: Appearance(s) in Saudi Super Cup)	0	8	0
Al Nassr	Total		30	3	3	2	6	0	1	0	42	5
Al-Tai (loan)	2021-22	Saudi Pro League	14	0	1	0	—		—		15	0
Career Total			44	3	4	2	6	0	1	0	57	5

== Honours ==
Al-Nassr

- Saudi Pro League: 2025–26

Saudi Arabia U23

- AFC U-23 Asian Cup: 2022
- WAFF U-23 Championship: 2022
