= 2022 AFC U-23 Asian Cup squads =

The 2022 AFC U-23 Asian Cup was an under-23 international football tournament organised by the Asian Football Confederation, taking place in Uzbekistan between 1–19 June 2022. The sixteen national teams involved in the tournament were required to register a squad of a minimum of 18 and a maximum of 23 players, including at least three goalkeepers (Regulations Article 29). Only players in these squads were eligible to take part in the competition. The tournament exclusively requires players to be born on or after 1 January 1999 to be eligible (Regulations Article 26).

Each national team had to register a preliminary list of minimum of 18 and maximum of 50 players (including at least four goalkeepers) via the Asian Football Confederation Administration System (AFCAS) no later than 30 days before to its first match of the tournament. Teams were able to replace or add up to 5 players to their preliminary list no later than 7 days before to its first match of the tournament provided that the maximum number of registered players is not exceeded (Regulations Article 25). The final list of 18−23 players per national team had to be submitted to the AFC at least 10 days prior to its first match of the tournament. All players in the final selection must had been registered in the preliminary list (Regulations Article 26.3).

Once the final lists had been received by the AFC, teams may had replaced any player up to 6 hours prior to their first match of the tournament. Any replacement player should come from the preliminary list (Regulations Article 26.2).

The age listed for each player is as of 1 June 2022, the first day of the tournament. Players in bold have been capped at full international level.

== Group A ==
The group A final squads were announced by the AFC on 26 May 2022.

=== Uzbekistan ===
Head coach: Timur Kapadze

No.	Pos.	Player	Date of birth (age)	Club
1	GK	**Abduvohid Nematov**	20 March 2001 (aged 21)	(Uzbekistan Football Association) FC Nasaf
2	DF	Saidazamat Mirsaidov	19 July 2001 (aged 20)	(Uzbekistan Football Association) FK Olympic
3	DF	Dostonbek Tursunov	3 January 2001 (aged 21)	(Uzbekistan Football Association) FK Olympic
4	DF	Abubakr Turdialiev	4 February 2001 (aged 21)	(Uzbekistan Football Association) FK Olympic
5	DF	**Mukhammadkodir Khamraliev**	6 July 2001 (aged 20)	(Uzbekistan Football Association) FK Olympic
6	DF	Jaloliddin Sodiqov	17 January 2002 (aged 20)	(Uzbekistan Football Association) FK Olympic
7	FW	**Khojimat Erkinov**	29 May 2001 (aged 21)	(Uzbekistan Football Association) Pakhtakor
8	MF	Ibrokhim Ibragimov	12 January 2001 (aged 21)	(Uzbekistan Football Association) PFK Metallurg
9	FW	**Ulugbek Khoshimov**	3 January 2001 (aged 21)	(Uzbekistan Football Association) Neftchi Fergana
10	MF	**Jasurbek Jaloliddinov** (captain)	15 May 2002 (aged 20)	(Kazakhstan Football Federation) FC Kairat
11	FW	Otabek Jurakuziyev	2 April 2002 (aged 20)	(Uzbekistan Football Association) FK Olympic
12	GK	Vladimir Nazarov	8 June 2002 (aged 19)	(Uzbekistan Football Association) FK Olympic
13	DF	Eldorbek Begimov	29 January 2001 (aged 21)	(Uzbekistan Football Association) FK Olympic
14	MF	**Abbosbek Fayzullaev**	3 October 2003 (aged 18)	(Uzbekistan Football Association) Pakhtakor
15	DF	Odil Abdumajidov	1 June 2001 (aged 21)	(Kazakhstan Football Federation) FC Ordabasy
16	DF	Shahzod Toirov	27 September 2001 (aged 20)	(Uzbekistan Football Association) FK Olympic
17	MF	**Diyor Kholmatov**	22 July 2002 (aged 19)	(Uzbekistan Football Association) Pakhtakor
18	DF	**Alibek Davronov**	28 December 2002 (aged 19)	(Uzbekistan Football Association) FC Nasaf
19	FW	**Khusayin Norchaev**	6 February 2002 (aged 20)	(Uzbekistan Football Association) FC Nasaf
20	FW	**Ruslanbek Jiyanov**	5 June 2001 (aged 20)	(Uzbekistan Football Association) FK Olympic
21	GK	Khamidullo Abdunabiev	20 August 2002 (aged 19)	(Uzbekistan Football Association) FK Olympic
22	FW	Alisher Odilov	15 July 2001 (aged 20)	(Uzbekistan Football Association) FK Olympic
23	MF	Abdurauf Buriev	20 July 2002 (aged 19)	(Uzbekistan Football Association) FK Olympic

=== Iran ===
The final squad of 23 players was announced on 21 May 2022.

Head coach: Mehdi Mahdavikia

No.	Pos.	Player	Date of birth (age)	Club
1	GK	Reza Kakhsaz	21 January 1999 (aged 23)	(Football Federation Islamic Republic of Iran) Paykan
2	FW	Mehdi Hashemnejad	27 October 2001 (aged 20)	(Football Federation Islamic Republic of Iran) Naft MIS
3	DF	Milad Kor	9 October 2003 (aged 18)	(Football Federation Islamic Republic of Iran) Zob Ahan
4	DF	**Saman Fallah**	12 May 2001 (aged 21)	(Football Federation Islamic Republic of Iran) Paykan
5	DF	Mohammad Amin Hazbavi	6 May 2003 (aged 19)	(Football Federation Islamic Republic of Iran) Foolad
6	MF	Alireza Bavieh	21 August 2002 (aged 19)	(Football Federation Islamic Republic of Iran) Foolad
7	MF	Mohammad Khodabandelou	7 September 1999 (aged 22)	(Football Federation Islamic Republic of Iran) Zob Ahan
8	MF	Mohammadhossein Zavari	11 January 2001 (aged 21)	(Football Federation Islamic Republic of Iran) Sanat Naft
9	MF	**Amirali Sadeghi**	9 February 2001 (aged 21)	(Football Federation Islamic Republic of Iran) Esteghlal
10	MF	Yasin Salmani (captain)	27 February 2002 (aged 20)	(Football Federation Islamic Republic of Iran) Sepahan
11	MF	Ahmad Shariatzadeh	1 July 2002 (aged 19)	(Football Federation Islamic Republic of Iran) Sanat Naft
12	GK	Payam Parsa	22 July 2002 (aged 19)	(Football Federation Islamic Republic of Iran) Sanat Naft
13	MF	Mohammad Mehdi Ahmadi	10 January 2001 (aged 21)	(Football Federation Islamic Republic of Iran) Naft MIS
14	FW	Amir Jafari	18 January 2002 (aged 20)	(Football Federation Islamic Republic of Iran) Shahr Khodro
15	MF	Mohammadhossein Eslami	13 April 2001 (aged 21)	(Football Federation Islamic Republic of Iran) Zob Ahan
16	DF	Mohammad Ghorbani	21 May 2001 (aged 21)	(Football Federation Islamic Republic of Iran) Nassaji
17	MF	Yadegar Rostami	2 January 2004 (aged 18)	(Polish Football Association) Pogoń Szczecin
18	DF	Alireza Khodaei	3 March 2001 (aged 21)	(Football Federation Islamic Republic of Iran) Saipa
19	FW	Belal Arazi	30 October 2001 (aged 20)	(Football Federation Islamic Republic of Iran) Pars Jonoubi Jam
20	FW	Ali Kalmarzy Sabet	30 October 2001 (aged 20)	(Royal Dutch Football Association) Roda JC
21	MF	Erfan Shahriari	19 May 2002 (aged 20)	(Football Federation Islamic Republic of Iran) Paykan
22	GK	Parsa Jafari	9 July 1999 (aged 22)	(Football Federation Islamic Republic of Iran) Zob Ahan
23	MF	**Arya Yousefi**	22 April 2002 (aged 20)	(Football Federation Islamic Republic of Iran) Sepahan

=== Qatar ===
The final squad of 23 players was announced on 23 May 2022.

Head coach: (Chile) Nicolás Córdova

No.	Pos.	Player	Date of birth (age)	Club
1	GK	Mahmud Abunada	1 February 2000 (aged 22)	(Qatar Football Association) Al-Arabi
2	DF	Ali Malolah	26 February 1999 (aged 23)	(Qatar Football Association) Al-Rayyan
3	DF	Diyab Taha	15 May 2001 (aged 21)	(Qatar Football Association) Al-Khor
4	DF	Mohammed Emad Ayash	27 February 2001 (aged 21)	(Qatar Football Association) Al-Wakrah
5	DF	**Yousef Aymen**	21 March 1999 (aged 23)	(Qatar Football Association) Qatar SC
6	MF	Osamah Al-Tairi	16 June 2002 (aged 19)	(Qatar Football Association) Al-Rayyan
7	FW	Abdulrasheed Umaru	12 August 1999 (aged 22)	(Qatar Football Association) Al Ahli
8	MF	**Mostafa Tarek**	28 March 2001 (aged 21)	(Qatar Football Association) Al Sadd
9	FW	**Yusuf Abdurisag**	6 August 1999 (aged 22)	(Qatar Football Association) Al Sadd
10	FW	**Hashim Ali**	17 August 2000 (aged 21)	(Qatar Football Association) Al-Rayyan
11	MF	Jassim Al-Mehairi	30 August 2002 (aged 19)	(Qatar Football Association) Qatar SC
12	DF	Abdullah Al-Sulaiti	11 August 2002 (aged 19)	(Qatar Football Association) Al Ahli
13	DF	Mohamed Al-Naemi	25 March 2000 (aged 22)	(Qatar Football Association) Al-Duhail
14	MF	Andri Syahputra	29 June 1999 (aged 22)	(Qatar Football Association) Al-Gharafa
15	DF	**Jassem Gaber**	20 February 2002 (aged 20)	(Qatar Football Association) Al-Arabi
16	MF	Faisal Azadi	13 January 2001 (aged 21)	(Qatar Football Association) Al Sadd
17	MF	Khaled Waleed	25 December 1999 (aged 22)	(Qatar Football Association) Qatar SC
18	MF	Mekki Tombari	15 February 2001 (aged 21)	(Qatar Football Association) Al-Kharaitiyat
19	DF	**Ahmed Suhail**	8 February 1999 (aged 23)	(Qatar Football Association) Al-Arabi
20	MF	**Ahmed Al Ganehi**	22 September 2000 (aged 21)	(Qatar Football Association) Al-Gharafa
21	GK	Marwan Badreldin	17 April 1999 (aged 23)	(Qatar Football Association) Al-Shamal
22	GK	**Salah Zakaria** (captain)	24 April 1999 (aged 23)	(Qatar Football Association) Al-Duhail
23	MF	Jassem Al-Sharshani	2 January 2003 (aged 19)	(Qatar Football Association) Al Ahli

=== Turkmenistan ===
Head coach: Ahmet Agamyradow

No.	Pos.	Player	Date of birth (age)	Club
1	GK	Batyr Gaýlyýew	26 February 2000 (aged 22)	(Football Federation of Turkmenistan) Ahal
2	DF	Yhlas Toýjanow	8 January 2001 (aged 21)	(Football Federation of Turkmenistan) Altyn Asyr
3	DF	Oraz Orazow	27 January 2002 (aged 20)	(Football Federation of Turkmenistan) Altyn Asyr
4	DF	Wepa Jumaýew	18 December 2000 (aged 21)	(Football Federation of Belarus) FC Lokomotiv Gomel
5	MF	Ruslan Täjiýew	8 July 2000 (aged 21)	(Football Federation of Turkmenistan) Altyn Asyr
6	DF	Roman Galkin	21 September 2002 (aged 19)	(Football Federation of Turkmenistan) Köpetdag
7	FW	**Rahman Myratberdiýew**	31 October 2001 (aged 20)	(Football Federation of Turkmenistan) Altyn Asyr
8	MF	Mirza Beknazarow	15 May 2000 (aged 22)	(Football Federation of Turkmenistan) Ahal
9	FW	**Begençmyrat Myradow**	9 August 2001 (aged 20)	(Football Federation of Turkmenistan) Altyn Asyr
10	MF	Meýlis Diniýew	11 July 2000 (aged 21)	(Football Federation of Turkmenistan) Ahal
11	FW	Şamämmet Hydyrow	20 January 2001 (aged 21)	(Football Federation of Turkmenistan) Altyn Asyr
12	DF	Ambýar Mahmudow	3 September 1999 (aged 22)	(Football Federation of Turkmenistan) Köpetdag
13	FW	Arslan Saparow	22 March 2003 (aged 19)	(Football Federation of Turkmenistan) Nebitçi FT
14	MF	**Teymur Çaryýew**	26 November 2000 (aged 21)	(Football Federation of Turkmenistan) FC Energetik Mary
15	DF	Döwran Berdiýew	27 December 2000 (aged 21)	(Football Federation of Turkmenistan) Aşgabat
16	GK	Rüstem Ahallyýew	16 November 2002 (aged 19)	(Football Federation of Turkmenistan) Ahal
17	FW	Daýanç Meredow	15 February 2003 (aged 19)	(Football Federation of Turkmenistan) Ahal
18	MF	Röwşen Baýlyýew	25 January 2000 (aged 22)	(Football Federation of Turkmenistan) Aşgabat
19	DF	Arzuwguly Sapargulýyew	28 July 2001 (aged 20)	(Football Federation of Turkmenistan) Ahal
20	MF	Hojanazar Gurbanow	19 April 2002 (aged 20)	(Football Federation of Turkmenistan) Aşgabat
21	DF	Begmyrat Arbatow	20 February 1999 (aged 23)	(Football Federation of Turkmenistan) Altyn Asyr
22	GK	**Rasul Çaryýew**	30 September 1999 (aged 22)	(Football Federation of Turkmenistan) Ahal
23	MF	**Welmyrat Ballakow**	4 April 1999 (aged 23)	(Football Federation of Turkmenistan) Altyn Asyr

== Group B ==
The group B final squads were announced by the AFC on 27 May 2022.

=== Australia ===
The final squad of 23 players was announced on 18 May 2022.

Head coach: Trevor Morgan

No.	Pos.	Player	Date of birth (age)	Club
1	GK	**Joe Gauci**	4 July 2000 (aged 21)	(Football Australia) Adelaide United
2	DF	**Lewis Miller**	24 August 2000 (aged 21)	(Football Australia) Central Coast Mariners
3	DF	Jay Rich-Baghuelou	22 October 1999 (aged 22)	(The Football Association) Accrington Stanley
4	DF	Jordan Courtney-Perkins	6 November 2002 (aged 19)	(Polish Football Association) Warta Poznań
5	DF	**Jordan Bos**	29 October 2002 (aged 19)	(Football Australia) Melbourne City
6	MF	Tyrese Francois (captain)	16 July 2000 (aged 21)	(The Football Association) Fulham
7	FW	Lachlan Brook	8 February 2001 (aged 21)	(Football Australia) Adelaide United
8	MF	Patrick Yazbek	22 August 2002 (aged 19)	(Football Australia) Sydney FC
9	FW	Alou Kuol	5 July 2001 (aged 20)	(German Football Association) VfB Stuttgart II
10	MF	Ramy Najjarine	23 April 2000 (aged 22)	(Football Australia) Western Sydney Wanderers
11	FW	**Kusini Yengi**	15 January 1999 (aged 23)	(Football Australia) Adelaide United
12	GK	Jacob Chapman	22 October 2000 (aged 21)	(The Football Association) Huddersfield Town
13	DF	Kai Trewin	18 May 2001 (aged 21)	(Football Australia) Brisbane Roar
14	MF	Josh Nisbet	15 June 1999 (aged 22)	(Football Australia) Central Coast Mariners
15	DF	Hosine Bility	10 May 2000 (aged 22)	(Football Association of Iceland) Fram Reykjavík
16	MF	Louis D'Arrigo	23 September 2001 (aged 20)	(Football Australia) Adelaide United
17	MF	Cameron Peupion	23 September 2002 (aged 19)	(The Football Association) Brighton & Hove Albion
18	GK	Nicholas Bilokapic	8 September 2002 (aged 19)	(The Football Association) Huddersfield Town
19	FW	Patrick Wood	16 September 2002 (aged 19)	(Football Australia) Sydney FC
20	DF	Joshua Rawlins	23 April 2004 (aged 18)	(Football Australia) Perth Glory
21	FW	Bernardo Oliveira	16 March 2004 (aged 18)	(Football Australia) Adelaide United
22	FW	Tristan Hammond	5 January 2003 (aged 19)	(Austrian Football Association) FK Austria Wien
23	DF	Jacob Farrell	19 November 2002 (aged 19)	(Football Australia) Central Coast Mariners

=== Jordan ===
The final squad of 23 players was announced on 16 May 2022.

Head coach: Ahmad Hayel

No.	Pos.	Player	Date of birth (age)	Club
1	GK	**Abdallah Al-Fakhouri**	20 January 2000 (aged 22)	(Jordan Football Association) Al-Wehdat
2	DF	Husam Abudahab	13 May 2000 (aged 22)	(Jordan Football Association) Al-Faisaly
3	DF	Yazan Abdelaal	7 January 1999 (aged 23)	(Jordan Football Association) Al-Sareeh
4	DF	Danial Afaneh	24 March 2001 (aged 21)	(Jordan Football Association) Al-Wehdat
5	DF	**Hadi Al-Hourani** (captain)	14 April 2000 (aged 22)	(Jordan Football Association) Al-Ramtha
6	MF	**Nizar Al-Rashdan**	23 March 1999 (aged 23)	(Jordan Football Association) Al-Faisaly
7	MF	**Omar Hani**	27 June 1999 (aged 22)	(Association of Football Federations of Azerbaijan) FK Gabala
8	MF	**Ibrahim Sadeh**	27 April 2000 (aged 22)	(Jordan Football Association) Al-Hussein Irbid
9	MF	Khaled Sayaheen	5 June 2000 (aged 21)	(Jordan Football Association) Al-Sareeh
10	FW	Mohammad Aburiziq	1 February 1999 (aged 23)	(Jordan Football Association) Al-Baqa'a
11	MF	Hamza Al-Saifi	3 February 1999 (aged 23)	(Jordan Football Association) Al-Jazeera
12	GK	Ahmad Al-Juaidi	9 April 2001 (aged 21)	(Jordan Football Association) Shabab Al-Ordon
13	DF	Shoqi Al-Quz'a	14 January 1999 (aged 23)	(Jordan Football Association) Shabab Al-Ordon
14	DF	Bassam Daldoom	13 October 1999 (aged 22)	(Jordan Football Association) Al-Hussein Irbid
15	MF	Abdelrahman Abu Al-Kas	7 October 1999 (aged 22)	(Jordan Football Association) Al-Ramtha
16	MF	Fadel Haikal	14 February 2000 (aged 22)	(Jordan Football Association) Shabab Al-Ordon
17	MF	**Amin Al-Shanaineh**	7 April 2003 (aged 19)	(Jordan Football Association) Al-Faisaly
18	MF	**Mohannad Abu Taha**	2 February 2003 (aged 19)	(Jordan Football Association) Al-Wehdat
19	MF	Ahmad Abu Sha'ireh	29 February 2000 (aged 22)	(Jordan Football Association) Al-Jazeera
20	MF	Bashar Al-Diabat	23 July 2001 (aged 20)	(Jordan Football Association) Al-Ramtha
21	FW	Abdallah Al-Shuaybat	19 February 2000 (aged 22)	(Jordan Football Association) Al-Faisaly
22	GK	Qais Abassi	24 May 2001 (aged 21)	(Jordan Football Association) Al-Jazeera
23	DF	Yousef Abu Al-Jazar	25 October 1999 (aged 22)	(Jordan Football Association) Al-Ramtha

=== Iraq ===
Head coach: (Czech Republic) Miroslav Soukup

No.	Pos.	Player	Date of birth (age)	Club
1	GK	Mustafa Adhab	2 March 1999 (aged 23)	(Iraq Football Association) Al-Diwaniya
2	DF	Abbas Badeea	9 January 2000 (aged 22)	(Iraq Football Association) Naft Maysan
3	DF	**Ahmed Maknzi**	24 September 2001 (aged 20)	(Iraq Football Association) Al-Zawraa
4	DF	**Hussein Ammar**	16 June 2001 (aged 20)	(Iraq Football Association) Naft Al-Basra
5	DF	Baqer Attwan	20 January 2002 (aged 20)	(Iraq Football Association) Karbalaa
6	DF	Cardo Siddik	21 September 2002 (aged 19)	(The Football Association) Crystal Palace U23
7	FW	**Amin Al-Hamawi**	17 December 2003 (aged 18)	(Swedish Football Association) Helsingborg
8	MF	**Moamel Abdul-Ridha**	28 March 2000 (aged 22)	(Iraq Football Association) Amanat Baghdad
9	FW	Wakaa Ramadan (captain)	17 April 1999 (aged 23)	(Iraq Football Association) Al-Talaba
10	MF	**Hasan Abdulkareem**	1 January 1999 (aged 23)	(Iraq Football Association) Al-Karkh
11	MF	**Muntadher Mohammed**	5 June 2001 (aged 20)	(Iraq Football Association) Al-Quwa Al-Jawiya
12	GK	Hussein Ali Joli	18 September 2002 (aged 19)	(Iraq Football Association) Erbil
13	MF	Ali Majid	22 October 2000 (aged 21)	(Iraq Football Association) Al-Qasim
14	DF	**Merchas Doski**	7 December 1999 (aged 22)	(Austrian Football Association) Wacker Innsbruck
15	DF	Mohammed Al-Baqer	8 April 2000 (aged 22)	(Iraq Football Association) Al-Diwaniya
16	MF	Muntadher Abdul-Amir	6 October 2001 (aged 20)	(Iraq Football Association) Al-Quwa Al-Jawiya
17	MF	Maytham Waad	28 April 2002 (aged 20)	(Iraq Football Association) Al-Quwa Al-Jawiya
18	MF	**Hiran Ahmed**	6 April 2000 (aged 22)	(Swiss Football Association) FC Thun
19	DF	**Hassan Raed**	23 September 2000 (aged 21)	(Iraq Football Association) Al-Quwa Al-Jawiya
20	MF	**Alexander Aoraha**	17 January 2003 (aged 19)	(The Football Association) Queens Park Rangers
21	MF	Ammar Ghalib	13 March 2001 (aged 21)	(Iraq Football Association) Al-Shorta
22	GK	Hassan Ahmed	4 October 1999 (aged 22)	(Iraq Football Association) Al-Talaba
23	DF	Ahmed Naeem	29 January 1999 (aged 23)	(Iraq Football Association) Al-Najaf

=== Kuwait ===
Head coach: Abdulaziz Hamada

No.	Pos.	Player	Date of birth (age)	Club
1	GK	Khaled Al-Ajaji (captain)	18 March 1999 (aged 23)	(Kuwait Football Association) Al-Fahaheel
2	DF	Abdullah Al-Jazzaf	20 June 2000 (aged 21)	(Kuwait Football Association) Kazma SC
3	DF	Omar Al-Rashidi	23 February 2002 (aged 20)	(Kuwait Football Association) Al-Tadamon
4	DF	Yousef Al-Haqan	5 February 2002 (aged 20)	(Kuwait Football Association) Al-Qadsia
5	MF	Othman Al-Shammari	4 April 2000 (aged 22)	(Kuwait Football Association) Kazma SC
6	DF	Abdulaziz Naji	19 August 2001 (aged 20)	(Kuwait Football Association) Kuwait SC
7	FW	**Yousef Ayedh**	18 March 2000 (aged 22)	(Kuwait Football Association) Kuwait SC
8	MF	**Naser Falah**	1 January 1999 (aged 23)	(Kuwait Football Association) Kazma SC
9	FW	**Fawwaz Al-Embailesh**	8 January 1999 (aged 23)	(Kuwait Football Association) Al-Qadsia
10	FW	**Aqeel Al-Hazeem**	8 December 1999 (aged 22)	(Kuwait Football Association) Kazma SC
11	FW	**Mohammad Bajeyah**	15 March 2001 (aged 21)	(Kuwait Football Association) Al-Jahra
12	DF	Saleh Al-Mehtab	18 September 2003 (aged 18)	(Kuwait Football Association) Kazma SC
13	DF	**Ali Abd Al-Rasoul**	13 January 1999 (aged 23)	(Kuwait Football Association) Al-Arabi
14	MF	Khaled Al-Mershed	6 April 1999 (aged 23)	(Kuwait Football Association) Al-Arabi
15	DF	Saleh Al-Bannay	16 March 2003 (aged 19)	(Kuwait Football Association) Kuwait SC
16	MF	**Mahdi Dashti**	26 October 2001 (aged 20)	(Kuwait Football Association) Al-Salmiya
17	DF	Mohammad Al-Rashed	2 April 2003 (aged 19)	(Kuwait Football Association) Kuwait SC
18	MF	Bader Al-Mutairi	26 September 2003 (aged 18)	(Kuwait Football Association) Al-Arabi
19	FW	Fahad Al-Azmi	1 January 2003 (aged 19)	(Kuwait Football Association) Al-Salmiya
20	MF	Fahad Zayed	4 February 2001 (aged 21)	(Kuwait Football Association) Kazma SC
21	DF	Abdulaziz Marzoaq	8 October 2000 (aged 21)	(Kuwait Football Association) Al-Jahra
22	GK	Abdulrahman Al-Fadhli	23 March 2001 (aged 21)	(Kuwait Football Association) Al-Salmiya
23	GK	Mohammad Al-Husainan	25 June 2000 (aged 21)	(Kuwait Football Association) Al-Nasr

== Group C ==
The group C final squads were announced by the AFC on 27 May 2022.

=== South Korea ===
The final squad was announced on 16 May 2022. On 27 May, Um Won-sang was replaced by Yang Hyun-jun, as the former got a callup from the senior national team.

Head coach: Hwang Sun-hong

No.	Pos.	Player	Date of birth (age)	Club
1	GK	Goh Dong-min	12 January 1999 (aged 23)	(Korea Football Association) Gyeongnam FC
2	DF	Choi Jun (captain)	17 April 1999 (aged 23)	(Korea Football Association) Busan IPark
3	DF	Lee Kyu-hyuk	4 May 1999 (aged 23)	(Korea Football Association) Jeonnam Dragons
4	DF	Lee Sang-min	30 August 1999 (aged 22)	(Korea Football Association) Chungnam Asan
5	DF	**Kim Ju-sung**	12 December 2000 (aged 21)	(Korea Football Association) Gimcheon Sangmu
6	MF	Go Jae-hyun	5 March 1999 (aged 23)	(Korea Football Association) Daegu FC
7	FW	**Cho Young-wook**	5 February 1999 (aged 23)	(Korea Football Association) FC Seoul
8	MF	**Hong Hyun-seok**	16 June 1999 (aged 22)	(Austrian Football Association) LASK
9	FW	Oh Se-hun	15 January 1999 (aged 23)	(Japan Football Association) Shimizu S-Pulse
10	FW	Park Jeong-in	7 October 2000 (aged 21)	(Korea Football Association) Busan IPark
11	MF	**Yang Hyun-jun**	25 May 2002 (aged 20)	(Korea Football Association) Gangwon FC
12	DF	Cho Hyun-taek	2 August 2001 (aged 20)	(Korea Football Association) Bucheon FC 1995
13	MF	**Lee Kang-in**	19 February 2001 (aged 21)	(Royal Spanish Football Federation) Mallorca
14	MF	**Eom Ji-sung**	9 May 2002 (aged 20)	(Korea Football Association) Gwangju FC
15	DF	Park Jae-hwan	11 October 2000 (aged 21)	(Korea Football Association) Gyeongnam FC
16	MF	Kwon Hyeok-kyu	13 March 2001 (aged 21)	(Korea Football Association) Gimcheon Sangmu
17	MF	Lee Jin-yong	1 May 2001 (aged 21)	(Korea Football Association) Daegu FC
18	MF	**Jeong Sang-bin**	1 April 2002 (aged 20)	(Swiss Football Association) Grasshoppers
19	MF	**Goh Young-joon**	9 July 2001 (aged 20)	(Korea Football Association) Pohang Steelers
20	DF	Kim Hyun-woo	7 March 1999 (aged 23)	(Korea Football Association) Ulsan Hyundai
21	GK	Min Seong-jun	22 July 1999 (aged 22)	(Korea Football Association) Incheon United
22	DF	Kim Tae-hwan	25 March 2000 (aged 22)	(Korea Football Association) Suwon Samsung Bluewings
23	GK	Park Ji-min	25 May 2000 (aged 22)	(Korea Football Association) Suwon Samsung Bluewings

=== Thailand ===
The preliminary 23 man squad was announced on 26 May 2022.

Head coach: Worrawoot Srimaka

No.	Pos.	Player	Date of birth (age)	Club
1	GK	Nopphon Lakhonphon	19 July 2000 (aged 21)	(Football Association of Thailand) Buriram United
2	DF	Nakin Wisetchat	9 July 1999 (aged 22)	(Football Association of Thailand) BG Pathum United
3	DF	**Chatmongkol Rueangthanarot**	9 May 2002 (aged 20)	(Football Association of Thailand) Chonburi
4	DF	**Jonathan Khemdee**	9 May 2002 (aged 20)	(Danish Football Association) OB
5	DF	**Kritsada Kaman** (captain)	18 March 1999 (aged 23)	(Football Association of Thailand) Chonburi
6	MF	Purachet Thodsanit	9 May 2001 (aged 21)	(Football Association of Thailand) Muangthong United
7	FW	**Ekanit Panya**	21 October 1999 (aged 22)	(Football Association of Thailand) Chiangmai United
8	FW	Korawich Tasa	7 April 2000 (aged 22)	(Football Association of Thailand) Muangthong United
9	FW	**Patrik Gustavsson**	19 April 2001 (aged 21)	(Football Association of Thailand) BG Pathum United
10	MF	**Thanawat Suengchitthawon**	8 January 2000 (aged 22)	(The Football Association) Leicester City U23
11	MF	**Channarong Promsrikaew**	17 April 2001 (aged 21)	(Royal Spanish Football Federation) Unión Adarve
12	DF	**Nicholas Mickelson**	24 July 1999 (aged 22)	(Danish Football Association) OB
13	DF	Yannick Nussbaum	30 August 2003 (aged 18)	(Swiss Football Association) Young Boys
14	FW	Achitpol Keereerom	21 October 2001 (aged 20)	(German Football Association) FC Augsburg II
15	DF	Songchai Thongcham	9 June 2001 (aged 20)	(Football Association of Thailand) Chonburi
16	DF	Wanchat Choosong	1 February 2000 (aged 22)	(Football Association of Thailand) PT Prachuap
17	FW	**Suphanat Mueanta**	2 August 2002 (aged 19)	(Football Association of Thailand) Buriram United
18	MF	Sittichok Paso	28 January 1999 (aged 23)	(Japan Football Association) FC Ryukyu
19	MF	Chayapipat Supunpasuch	25 February 2001 (aged 21)	(Portuguese Football Federation) Estoril B
20	GK	Supanut Suadsong	25 February 1999 (aged 23)	(Football Association of Thailand) Bangkok United
21	FW	Jakkit Palapon	1 July 1999 (aged 22)	(Football Association of Thailand) Khon Kaen United
22	MF	**Ben Davis**	24 November 2000 (aged 21)	(The Football Association) Oxford United
23	GK	Kiadtiphon Udom	26 June 2000 (aged 21)	(Football Association of Thailand) BG Pathum United

=== Vietnam ===
The preliminary 25 man squad was announced on 23 May 2022. The final squad of 23 players was announced on 1 June 2022.

Head coach: (South Korea) Gong Oh-kyun

No.	Pos.	Player	Date of birth (age)	Club
1	GK	**Nguyễn Văn Toản**	26 November 1999 (aged 22)	(Vietnam Football Federation) Hải Phòng
2	DF	**Phan Tuấn Tài**	7 January 2001 (aged 21)	(Vietnam Football Federation) Đắk Lắk
3	DF	**Lương Duy Cương**	7 November 2001 (aged 20)	(Vietnam Football Federation) SHB Đà Nẵng
4	DF	**Bùi Hoàng Việt Anh** (captain)	1 January 1999 (aged 23)	(Vietnam Football Federation) Hà Nội
5	DF	**Nguyễn Thanh Bình**	2 November 2000 (aged 21)	(Vietnam Football Federation) Viettel
6	DF	Vũ Tiến Long	4 April 2002 (aged 20)	(Vietnam Football Federation) Hà Nội
7	MF	**Lê Văn Đô**	7 August 2001 (aged 20)	(Vietnam Football Federation) Phố Hiến
8	MF	**Khuất Văn Khang**	11 May 2003 (aged 19)	(Vietnam Football Federation) Viettel
9	FW	**Nguyễn Văn Tùng**	2 June 2001 (aged 20)	(Vietnam Football Federation) Hà Nội
10	FW	Trần Danh Trung	3 October 2000 (aged 21)	(Vietnam Football Federation) Viettel
11	FW	Lê Minh Bình	25 December 1999 (aged 22)	(Vietnam Football Federation) Công An Nhân Dân
12	GK	Đặng Tuấn Hưng	1 May 2000 (aged 22)	(Vietnam Football Federation) Phố Hiến
13	MF	Huỳnh Công Đến	19 August 2001 (aged 20)	(Vietnam Football Federation) Phố Hiến
14	FW	**Nguyễn Văn Trường**	9 October 2003 (aged 18)	(Vietnam Football Federation) Hà Nội
15	MF	Dụng Quang Nho	1 January 2000 (aged 22)	(Vietnam Football Federation) Hải Phòng
16	FW	Võ Đình Lâm	10 January 2000 (aged 22)	(Vietnam Football Federation) Hoàng Anh Gia Lai
17	MF	**Nguyễn Hai Long**	27 August 2000 (aged 21)	(Vietnam Football Federation) Hà Nội
18	FW	**Nhâm Mạnh Dũng**	12 April 2000 (aged 22)	(Vietnam Football Federation) Viettel
19	DF	**Nguyễn Thanh Nhân**	14 April 2000 (aged 22)	(Vietnam Football Federation) Hoàng Anh Gia Lai
20	DF	Đoàn Anh Việt	15 August 1999 (aged 22)	(Vietnam Football Federation) Sài Gòn
21	GK	Quan Văn Chuẩn	7 January 2001 (aged 21)	(Vietnam Football Federation) Hà Nội
22	MF	**Lý Công Hoàng Anh**	1 December 1999 (aged 22)	(Vietnam Football Federation) Bình Định
23	MF	Trần Văn Công	15 February 1999 (aged 23)	(Vietnam Football Federation) Hồng Lĩnh Hà Tĩnh

=== Malaysia ===
The final squad was announced on 28 May 2022.

Head coach: (Australia) Brad Maloney

No.	Pos.	Player	Date of birth (age)	Club
1	GK	Azri Ghani	30 April 1999 (aged 23)	(Football Association of Malaysia) Kuala Lumpur City
2	DF	**Quentin Cheng**	20 November 1999 (aged 22)	(Football Association of Malaysia) Selangor
3	DF	Faiz Amer	15 February 2003 (aged 19)	(Football Association of Malaysia) Selangor II
4	DF	Azrin Afiq	2 January 2002 (aged 20)	(Football Association of Malaysia) Selangor
5	DF	**Harith Haiqal**	22 June 2002 (aged 19)	(Football Association of Malaysia) Selangor
6	DF	**Azam Azmi**	12 February 2001 (aged 21)	(Football Association of Malaysia) Terengganu
7	MF	**Mukhairi Ajmal** (captain)	7 November 2001 (aged 20)	(Football Association of Malaysia) Selangor
8	MF	**Nik Akif**	11 May 1999 (aged 23)	(Football Association of Malaysia) Terengganu
9	FW	Hadi Fayyadh	22 January 2000 (aged 22)	(Japan Football Association) Azul Claro Numazu
10	FW	**Luqman Hakim**	5 March 2002 (aged 20)	(Royal Belgian Football Association) Kortrijk
11	FW	Syafik Ismail	1 March 2000 (aged 22)	(Football Association of Malaysia) Terengganu
12	DF	Hairiey Hakim	14 January 2000 (aged 22)	(Football Association of Malaysia) Terengganu
13	FW	Azfar Fikri	5 February 2000 (aged 22)	(Football Association of Malaysia) Terengganu II
14	DF	Zikri Khalili	25 June 2002 (aged 19)	(Football Association of Malaysia) Selangor
15	DF	'Ubaidullah Shamsul	30 November 2003 (aged 18)	(Football Association of Malaysia) Projek FAM-MSN
16	MF	Syahir Bashah	16 September 2001 (aged 20)	(Football Association of Malaysia) Selangor
17	DF	Safwan Mazlan	22 February 2000 (aged 22)	(Football Association of Malaysia) Terengganu II
18	FW	Danial Asri	1 April 2000 (aged 22)	(Football Association of Malaysia) Selangor
19	DF	Umar Hakeem	26 August 2002 (aged 19)	(Football Association of Malaysia) Johor Darul Ta'zim II
20	FW	Aiman Afif	18 February 2001 (aged 21)	(Football Association of Malaysia) Kedah Darul Aman
21	MF	Shafi Azswad	9 March 2001 (aged 21)	(Football Association of Malaysia) Johor Darul Ta'zim II
22	GK	**Rahadiazli Rahalim**	28 May 2001 (aged 21)	(Football Association of Malaysia) Terengganu
23	GK	Firdaus Irman	23 July 2001 (aged 20)	(Football Association of Malaysia) PDRM

== Group D ==
The group D final squads were announced by the AFC on 29 May 2022.

=== Saudi Arabia ===
The final squad of 23 players was announced on 26 May 2022. On 31 May, Muhannad Al-Shanqeeti and Musab Al-Juwayr withdrew from the squad due to injury and were replaced by Saad Balobaid and Ahmed Al-Ghamdi.

Head coach: Saad Al-Shehri

No.	Pos.	Player	Date of birth (age)	Club
1	GK	**Nawaf Al-Aqidi**	10 May 2000 (aged 22)	(Saudi Arabian Football Federation) Al-Tai
2	DF	Saad Balobaid	27 January 2000 (aged 22)	(Saudi Arabian Football Federation) Al-Taawoun
3	DF	**Waleed Al-Ahmed**	3 May 1999 (aged 23)	(Saudi Arabian Football Federation) Al-Faisaly
4	DF	**Khalifah Al-Dawsari**	2 January 1999 (aged 23)	(Saudi Arabian Football Federation) Al-Fateh
5	DF	**Hassan Tambakti** (captain)	9 February 1999 (aged 23)	(Saudi Arabian Football Federation) Al-Shabab
6	MF	**Ibrahim Mahnashi**	18 November 1999 (aged 22)	(Saudi Arabian Football Federation) Al-Ettifaq
7	MF	**Ayman Yahya**	14 May 2001 (aged 21)	(Saudi Arabian Football Federation) Al-Ahli
8	MF	**Hamed Al-Ghamdi**	2 April 1999 (aged 23)	(Saudi Arabian Football Federation) Al-Ettifaq
9	FW	**Firas Al-Buraikan**	14 May 2000 (aged 22)	(Saudi Arabian Football Federation) Al-Fateh
10	MF	**Turki Al-Ammar**	24 September 1999 (aged 22)	(Saudi Arabian Football Federation) Al-Shabab
11	MF	**Ahmed Al-Ghamdi**	20 September 2001 (aged 20)	(Saudi Arabian Football Federation) Al-Ettifaq
12	DF	**Moteb Al-Harbi**	19 February 2000 (aged 22)	(Saudi Arabian Football Federation) Al-Shabab
13	DF	Hamad Al-Yami	17 May 1999 (aged 23)	(Saudi Arabian Football Federation) Al-Hilal
14	MF	**Awad Al-Nashri**	15 March 2002 (aged 20)	(Saudi Arabian Football Federation) Al-Ittihad
15	MF	**Hussain Al-Eisa**	29 December 2000 (aged 21)	(Saudi Arabian Football Federation) Al-Batin
16	MF	Ziyad Al-Johani	11 November 2001 (aged 20)	(Saudi Arabian Football Federation) Al-Ahli
17	FW	**Haitham Asiri**	25 March 2001 (aged 21)	(Saudi Arabian Football Federation) Al-Ahli
18	MF	**Meshal Al-Sebyani**	11 April 2001 (aged 21)	(Saudi Arabian Football Federation) Al-Faisaly
19	FW	**Abdullah Radif**	20 January 2003 (aged 19)	(Saudi Arabian Football Federation) Al-Hilal
20	FW	**Mohammed Maran**	15 February 2001 (aged 21)	(Saudi Arabian Football Federation) Al-Tai
21	GK	Abdulrahman Al-Sanbi	3 February 2001 (aged 21)	(Saudi Arabian Football Federation) Al-Ahli
22	GK	Abdulrahman Al-Shammari	9 July 2000 (aged 21)	(Saudi Arabian Football Federation) Najran
23	DF	**Saud Abdulhamid**	18 July 1999 (aged 22)	(Saudi Arabian Football Federation) Al-Hilal

=== United Arab Emirates ===
The final squad of 23 players was announced on 30 May 2022.

Head coach: (Spain) Denis Silva Puig

No.	Pos.	Player	Date of birth (age)	Club
1	GK	Eisa Ahmed	6 December 2000 (aged 21)	(United Arab Emirates Football Association) Al-Ittihad Kalba
2	DF	**Abdulla Idrees**	16 August 1999 (aged 22)	(United Arab Emirates Football Association) Al-Jazira
3	DF	Yousif Al-Mheiri	30 November 1999 (aged 22)	(United Arab Emirates Football Association) Al-Wasl
4	MF	Ahmed Al-Hammadi	6 January 2001 (aged 21)	(United Arab Emirates Football Association) Emirates
5	DF	Saeed Suleiman	8 April 1999 (aged 23)	(United Arab Emirates Football Association) Ajman
6	MF	Eid Khamis (captain)	20 May 1999 (aged 23)	(United Arab Emirates Football Association) Shabab Al-Ahli
7	FW	Rashid Mubarak	8 March 1999 (aged 23)	(United Arab Emirates Football Association) Al-Nasr
8	MF	Abdelaziz Al-Bloushi	3 March 2002 (aged 20)	(United Arab Emirates Football Association) Shabab Al-Ahli
9	FW	Abdulla Abdelrahman	25 January 2000 (aged 22)	(United Arab Emirates Football Association) Khor Fakkan
10	FW	Saeed Al-Kaabi	25 January 1999 (aged 23)	(United Arab Emirates Football Association) Emirates
11	FW	Yaser Hassan	25 April 2001 (aged 21)	(United Arab Emirates Football Association) Al-Itttihad Kalba
12	DF	**Ahmed Abdullah Jamil**	16 January 1999 (aged 23)	(United Arab Emirates Football Association) Shabab Al-Ahli
13	DF	Faris Khalil	8 October 2000 (aged 21)	(United Arab Emirates Football Association) Emirates
14	FW	Fahad Bader	9 March 2001 (aged 21)	(United Arab Emirates Football Association) Emirates
15	FW	Mansoor Saeed	29 March 2003 (aged 19)	(United Arab Emirates Football Association) Al-Wahda
16	MF	Hussain Mahdi	24 July 2000 (aged 21)	(United Arab Emirates Football Association) Al-Nasr
17	GK	Suhail Abdulla	26 August 1999 (aged 22)	(United Arab Emirates Football Association) Emirates
18	DF	**Zayed Sultan**	11 April 2001 (aged 21)	(United Arab Emirates Football Association) Al-Jazira
19	FW	Eisa Khalfan	12 March 2003 (aged 19)	(United Arab Emirates Football Association) Al-Ain
20	DF	Mohamed Abdelrahman	16 January 2001 (aged 21)	(United Arab Emirates Football Association) Al-Nasr
21	MF	Abdallah Sultan	21 March 1999 (aged 23)	(United Arab Emirates Football Association) Baniyas
22	GK	Rakaan Waleed	27 March 2001 (aged 21)	(United Arab Emirates Football Association) Al-Jazira
23	MF	Sultan Ali	6 October 2001 (aged 20)	(United Arab Emirates Football Association) Shabab Al-Ahli

=== Japan ===
A squad of 21 players was announced on 24 May 2022. Yutaro Oda was ruled out of the squad after picking up an injury, and on 27−28 May 2022, Sato, Nakashima and Yamada were called up to replace him, completing a 23-player squad. On 29 May 2022, Ryuya Nishio was also ruled out with an injury and was replaced by Kimura.

Head coach: Go Oiwa

No.	Pos.	Player	Date of birth (age)	Club
1	GK	Leo Kokubo	23 January 2001 (aged 21)	(Portuguese Football Federation) Benfica
2	DF	Riku Handa	1 January 2002 (aged 20)	(Japan Football Association) Montedio Yamagata
3	DF	Seiya Baba	24 October 2001 (aged 20)	(Japan Football Association) Tokyo Verdy
4	DF	Kaito Suzuki	25 August 2002 (aged 19)	(Japan Football Association) Tochigi SC
5	DF	Seiji Kimura	24 August 2001 (aged 20)	(Japan Football Association) Montedio Yamagata
6	MF	Daiki Matsuoka	1 June 2001 (aged 21)	(Japan Football Association) Shimizu S-Pulse
7	MF	Rihito Yamamoto	12 December 2001 (aged 20)	(Japan Football Association) Tokyo Verdy
8	MF	**Joel Chima Fujita** (captain)	16 February 2002 (aged 20)	(Japan Football Association) Yokohama F. Marinos
9	FW	Shota Fujio	2 May 2001 (aged 21)	(Japan Football Association) Tokushima Vortis
10	MF	Koki Saito	10 August 2001 (aged 20)	(Royal Belgian Football Association) Lommel SK
11	FW	**Mao Hosoya**	7 September 2001 (aged 20)	(Japan Football Association) Kashiwa Reysol
12	GK	**Zion Suzuki**	21 August 2002 (aged 19)	(Japan Football Association) Urawa Red Diamonds
13	MF	Kein Sato	11 July 2001 (aged 20)	(Japan Football Association) Meiji University
14	MF	Fuki Yamada	10 July 2001 (aged 20)	(Japan Football Association) Kyoto Sanga
15	DF	Taiga Hata	20 January 2002 (aged 20)	(Japan Football Association) Shonan Bellmare
16	DF	Takashi Uchino	7 March 2001 (aged 21)	(German Football Association) Fortuna Dusseldorf
17	DF	Hijiri Kato	16 September 2001 (aged 20)	(Japan Football Association) V-Varen Nagasaki
18	MF	Yuito Suzuki	25 October 2001 (aged 20)	(Japan Football Association) Shimizu S-Pulse
19	MF	Kuryu Matsuki	30 April 2003 (aged 19)	(Japan Football Association) FC Tokyo
20	MF	Shunsuke Mito	28 September 2002 (aged 19)	(Japan Football Association) Albirex Niigata
21	FW	Taika Nakashima	8 June 2002 (aged 19)	(Japan Football Association) Hokkaido Consadole Sapporo
22	DF	Anrie Chase	24 August 2004 (aged 17)	(German Football Association) VfB Stuttgart II
23	GK	Masato Sasaki	1 May 2002 (aged 20)	(Japan Football Association) Kashiwa Reysol

=== Tajikistan ===
The final squad of 23 players was announced on 30 May 2022.

Head coach: Aslidin Khabibulloev

No.	Pos.	Player	Date of birth (age)	Club
1	GK	Daler Azizov	19 May 2000 (aged 22)	(Tajikistan Football Federation) Regar-TadAZ
2	DF	Ojatullo Safarov	19 December 2000 (aged 21)	(Tajikistan Football Federation) Fayzkand
3	DF	Mukhammad Naskov	27 May 1999 (aged 23)	(Tajikistan Football Federation) Khatlon
4	MF	Emomali Akhmadkhon	4 May 2002 (aged 20)	(Tajikistan Football Federation) Regar-TadAZ
5	DF	Shohrukh Sangov	31 October 2002 (aged 19)	(Tajikistan Football Federation) Regar-TadAZ
6	DF	Naimdzhon Ibragimzoda	11 July 1999 (aged 22)	(Tajikistan Football Federation) Khujand
7	MF	**Karomatullo Saidov** (captain)	12 October 1999 (aged 22)	(Tajikistan Football Federation) Khujand
8	MF	**Abdulmumin Zabirov**	4 August 2001 (aged 20)	(Tajikistan Football Federation) Eskhata
9	MF	**Sharafdzhon Solehov**	14 December 1999 (aged 22)	(Tajikistan Football Federation) CSKA Pamir
10	MF	**Islom Zoirov**	12 January 2002 (aged 20)	(Tajikistan Football Federation) Istiklol
11	FW	**Rustam Soirov**	12 September 2002 (aged 19)	(Tajikistan Football Federation) Istiklol
12	DF	Firdaus Alinazarov	6 November 2001 (aged 20)	(Tajikistan Football Federation) Khatlon
13	FW	**Amadoni Kamolov**	16 January 2003 (aged 19)	(Royal Spanish Football Federation) Rayo Majadahonda
14	MF	Sharifbek Rakhmatov	1 September 2002 (aged 19)	(Uzbekistan Football Association) Turon Yaypan
15	DF	**Alisher Barotov**	10 September 1999 (aged 22)	(Tajikistan Football Federation) Khujand
16	GK	**Shokhrukh Kirgizboev**	1 May 2002 (aged 20)	(Tajikistan Football Federation) Khujand
17	FW	Mukhammadali Azizboev	4 January 2003 (aged 19)	(Tajikistan Football Federation) Khujand
18	DF	Daler Yodgorov	1 May 2000 (aged 22)	(Tajikistan Football Federation) Khujand
19	DF	**Khuseyn Nurmatov**	10 May 2000 (aged 22)	(Tajikistan Football Federation) Istaravshan
20	MF	Umardzhon Sharipov	5 June 2000 (aged 21)	(Tajikistan Football Federation) Khatlon
21	MF	Sorbon Avgonov	29 November 2000 (aged 21)	(Tajikistan Football Federation) Khujand
22	FW	Sunatullo Ismoilov	28 April 2002 (aged 20)	(Tajikistan Football Federation) Khatlon
23	GK	Akhlidin Khabibulloev	11 August 2000 (aged 21)	(Tajikistan Football Federation) Fayzkand
