= Uzbekistan national under-23 football team results =

This page represents all time results of Uzbekistan U-23, U-22 and U-21 national football teams.

== Results ==
=== U-23 ===
==== 2002 ====
28 September 2002 2002 Asian Games GS	Uzbekistan	0–3	Bahrain	Changwon, South Korea
16:33			Jalal 14'; H. Ali 34'; Hassan 53'	Stadium: Civil Stadium

1 October 2002 2002 Asian Games GS	Uzbekistan	2–0	Palestine	Yangsan, South Korea
16:33	Bayramov 31'; Haydarov 45+1'			Stadium: Yangsan Stadium

5 October 2002 2002 Asian Games GS	Japan	1–0	Uzbekistan	Masan, South Korea
19:03	Nakayama 39' (pen.)			Stadium: Masan Stadium

==== 2006 ====
28 November 2006 2006 Asian Games GS	United Arab Emirates	1–2	Uzbekistan	Doha, Qatar
17:15	Saqer 69'		Geynrikh 44', 55'	Stadium: Jassim Bin Hamad Stadium; Referee: Bae Jae-Yong (South Korea)

2 December 2006 2006 Asian Games GS	Uzbekistan	1–0	Qatar	Doha, Qatar
19:45	Geynrikh 67'			Stadium: Jassim Bin Hamad Stadium; Referee: Krishnan Ramachandran (Malaysia)

5 December 2006 2006 Asian Games GS	Uzbekistan	3–1	Jordan	Doha. Qatar
19:45	Geynrikh 11'; Denisov 47'; Djeparov 74'		Al-Saify 35'	Stadium: Al-Gharafa Stadium; Referee: Mahmoud Rafiei (Iran)

9 December 2006 2006 Asian Games QF	Uzbekistan	1–2 (a.e.t.)	Iraq	Doha, Qatar
16:00	Geynrikh 45+1'		Jassim 10'; Mansour 95'	Stadium: Al-Gharafa Stadium; Referee: Krishnan Ramachandran (Malaysia)

==== 2010 ====
7 November 2010 2010 Asian Games GS	Uzbekistan	3–0	Bangladesh	Guangzhou, China
16:00	Turaev 23'; Ahmedov 43'; Nagaev 81'	Report		Stadium: Yingdong Stadium; Referee: Ebrahim Ali (Bahrain)

9 November 2010 2010 Asian Games GS	Uzbekistan	0–1	Hong Kong	Guangzhou, China
19:00		Report	Chan Wai Ho 60'	Stadium: Huadu Stadium; Referee: Kadhum Auda (Iraq)

11 November 2010 2010 Asian Games GS	Uzbekistan	0–3	United Arab Emirates	Guangzhou, China
16:00		Report	Awana 10'; Khalil 17', 78'	Stadium: Yingdong Stadium; Referee: Minoru Tojo (Japan)

15 November 2010 2010 Asian Games R16	Qatar	0–1 (a.e.t.)	Uzbekistan	Guangzhou, China
19:00		Report	Nagaev 108'	Stadium: University City Stadium; Referee: Ben Williams (Australia)

19 November 2010 2010 Asian Games QF	South Korea	3–1 (a.e.t.)	Uzbekistan	Guangzhou, China
19:00	Hong Jeong-Ho 3'; Park Chu-Young 93'; Kim Bo-Kyung 102'	Report	Karimov 72'	Stadium: Tianhe Stadium; Referee: Minoru Tojo (Japan)

==== 2012 ====
19 January 2012 Match World Cup	Shakhtar Donetsk (Ukraine)	1–1 (5–6 p)	Uzbekistan	Maktoum Bin Rashid Al Maktoum Stadium
	Luiz Adriano 51'		Turaev 42'
	Penalties
	Alan Patrick (penalty missed); Luiz Adriano (penalty scored); Gai (penalty scored); Mkhitaryan (penalty scored); Kobin (penalty scored); Aghahowa (penalty scored); Hübschman (penalty missed)		Tukhtakhodjaev (penalty missed); Karimov (penalty scored); Rahmatullaev (penalty scored); Nagaev (penalty scored); Pirimov (penalty scored); Hashimov (penalty scored); Ibragimov (penalty scored)

21 January 2012 Match World Cup	Rostov (Russia)	0–1	Uzbekistan	Maktoum Bin Rashid Al Maktoum Stadium
			Turaev 35'

23 January 2011 Match WC, Final	Zenit St. Petersburg (Russia)	5–0	Uzbekistan	Maktoum Bin Rashid Al Maktoum Stadium

11 February 2012 Friendly	Philippines	0–3	Uzbekistan	Dubai
		Report	Turaev 12'; Nagaev 42', 64'

16 February 2012 Friendly	Oman	0–0	Uzbekistan	Sultan Qaboos Sports Complex, Muscat
		Report

24 February 2012 Friendly	Egypt	3 - 1	Uzbekistan	Al-Maktoum Stadium, Dubai
	Shoukry 40'; Marwan Mohsen 79'; Mahmoud Abdul-Monem 83'		Pirimov 75'; Ibrokhimov (red card) 81'

2012 Summer Olympics Qualification

5 February 2012 2012 Summer Olympics	Uzbekistan	2–0	Australia	JAR Stadium, Tashkent
15:00 UTC+05:00	Turaev 27'; Zoteev 85'	Report		Attendance: 4,527; Referee: Abdullah Balideh (Qatar)

21 February 2012 2012 Summer Olympics	Iraq	2–1	Uzbekistan	Al Arabi Stadium, Doha (Qatar)
16:45 UTC+3	M. Abdullah 45+2' (pen.); Abdul-Ameer 88'	Report	Musaev 23'	Attendance: 100; Referee: Tan Hai (China PR)

14 March 2012 2012 Summer Olympics	Uzbekistan	2–3	United Arab Emirates	JAR Stadium, Tashkent
18:00 UTC+5	Zoteev 34'; Musaev 47'	Report	Khalil 51', 55'; Saleh 90+3'	Attendance: 7,600; Referee: Masaaki Toma (Japan)

27 March 2012 2012 Summer Olympics	Uzbekistan	2–1	Syria	Mỹ Đình National Stadium, Hanoi
20:00 UTC+7	Turaev 73'; Zoteev 88'	Report	Shahen 14'	Attendance: 1,000; Referee: Alireza Faghani (Iran)

29 March 2012 2012 Summer Olympics	Oman	2–0	Uzbekistan	Mỹ Đình National Stadium, Hanoi
19:00 UTC+7	Al-Hadhri 16' (pen.); Saleh 45+2'	Report		Attendance: 1,300; Referee: Malik Abdul Bashir (Singapore)

==== 2014 ====
21 June 2014 Friendly	China	0–1	Uzbekistan	Shanghai
			Sergeev 68'

23 June 2014 Friendly	China	0–0	Uzbekistan	Shanghai

2014 Asian Games

15 September 2014 Group stage	Uzbekistan	1–1	Hong Kong	Incheon
20:00	Sergeev 75'	Report	Chan Siu Kwan 80'	Stadium: Incheon Munhak Stadium; Referee: Ali Sabah Adday Al-Qaysi (Iraq)

18 September 2014 Group stage	Uzbekistan	3–0	Bangladesh	Ansan
20:00	Shodiev 12', 21'; Rashidov 34'	Report		Stadium: Ansan Wa~ Stadium; Referee: Yu Ming-hsun (Chinese Taipei)

22 September 2014 Group stage	Afghanistan	0–5	Uzbekistan	Goyang
17:00		Report	Krimets 6'; Shodiev 42', 90+1'; Sayfiyev 50'; Sergeev 86'	Stadium: Goyang Stadium; Referee: Khamis Al-Marri (Oman)

26 September 2014 Round of 16	Uzbekistan	2–3	Saudi Arabia	Goyang
20:00	Iskanderov 45+1'; Shodiev 70'	Report	Al-Ghamdi 17' (pen.); Youldashev 54' (o.g.); Al-Bishi 90+5'	Stadium: Goyang Stadium; Referee: Chaiya Mahapab (Thailand)

==== 2016 ====
4 January 2016 Friendly	Uzbekistan	0–2	China	Dubai
	Xie Pengfei 30'; Liu Binbin 78'		Mahmoud Al-Mardi 68'

7 January 2016 Friendly	Uzbekistan	2–1	Jordan	Dubai
	Sergeev 64', 78'		Mahmoud Al-Mardi 68'

13 January 2016 2016 AFC U-23 Championship	South Korea	2–1	Uzbekistan	Suheim Bin Hamad Stadium, Doha
19:30	Moon Chang-jin 20' (pen.), 48'	Report	Khamdamov 57'	Attendance: 803; Referee: Fahad Al-Mirdasi (Saudi Arabia)

16 January 2016 2016 AFC U-23 Championship	Uzbekistan	2–3	Iraq	Suheim Bin Hamad Stadium, Doha
19:30	Khamdamov 1'; Khakimov 79'	Report	Amjad A. 38'; Mahdi K. 43'; Humam T. 84'	Attendance: 686; Referee: Ahmed Al-Kaf (Oman)

19 January 2016 2016 AFC U-23 Championship	Uzbekistan	3–1	Yemen	Suheim Bin Hamad Stadium, Doha
19:30	Sokhibov 18'; Sergeev 68'; Masharipov 90+3'	Report	A. Al-Sarori 82'	Attendance: 227; Referee: Ma Ning (China)

==== 2017 ====
11 December 2017 2017 M-150 Cup	Myanmar	2–2	Uzbekistan	Buriram
18:30	Sithu Aung 17'; Lwin Moe Aung 75'	Report	Bobir Abdixolikov 88'; Zabikhillo Urinboev 90+4' (pen.)	Stadium: New I-Mobile Stadium; Referee: Teetichai Nualjan (Thailand)

13 December 2017 2017 M-150 Cup	Uzbekistan	2–1	Vietnam	Buriram
14:30	Bobir Abdixolikov 31'; Zabikhillo Urinboev 66'	Report	Nguyễn Công Phượng 59' (pen.)	Stadium: New I-Mobile Stadium; Referee: Sivakorn Pu-udom (Thailand)

15 December 2017 2017 M-150 Cup	Japan	2–2 (3-4 p)	Uzbekistan	Buriram
18:30	Yuta Kamiya 42'; Ren Komatsu 88'	Report	Zabikhillo Urinboev 42', 75'	Stadium: New I-Mobile Stadium; Referee: Mongkolchai Pechsri (Thailand)
	Penalties
	Yuta Kamiya (penalty scored); Ren Komatsu (penalty scored); Taishi Matsumoto (penalty scored); Daiki Suga (penalty missed); Ayase Ueda (penalty missed)		(penalty scored) Dostonbek Khamdamov; (penalty scored) Javokhir Sidikov; (penalty scored) Odiljon Hamrobekov; (penalty scored) Azizjon Ganiev

==== 2018 ====
9 January 2018 2018 AFC U-23 Championship GS	Qatar	1–0	Uzbekistan	Changzhou Olympic Sports Centre, Changzhou
19:30	Almoez Ali 55'	Report		Attendance: 1,100; Referee: Kim Dong-jin (South Korea)

12 January 2018 2018 AFC U-23 Championship GS	Uzbekistan	1–0	China	Changzhou Olympic Sports Centre, Changzhou
16:00	Alijonov 14'	Report		Attendance: 13,800; Referee: Muhammad Taqi (Singapore)

15 January 2018 2018 AFC U-23 Championship GS	Uzbekistan	1–0	Oman	Jiangyin Stadium, Jiangyin
16:00	Tursunov 36'	Report		Referee: Hettikamkanamge Perera (Sri Lanka)

19 January 2018 2018 AFC U-23 Championship QF	Japan	0–4	Uzbekistan	Jiangyin Stadium, Jiangyin
16:00		Report	Sidikov 31'; Khamdamov 34'; Yakhshiboev 39', 47'	Attendance: 380; Referee: Fu Ming (China)

23 January 2018 2018 AFC U-23 Championship SF	Uzbekistan	4–1 (a.e.t.)	South Korea	Jiangyin Stadium, Jiangyin
19:30	Urinboev 33'; Ganiev 99'; Yakhshiboev 110'; Komilov 120+1'	Report	Hwang Hyun-soo 58'	Attendance: 367; Referee: Turki Al-Khudhayr (Saudi Arabia)

27 January 2018 2018 AFC U-23 Championship F	Vietnam	1–2 (a.e.t.)	Uzbekistan	Changzhou Olympic Sports Centre, Changzhou
16:00	Nguyễn Quang Hải 41'	Report	Ashurmatov 8'; Sidorov 120'	Attendance: 6,200; Referee: Ahmed Al-Kaf (Oman)

==== 2020 ====
15 January 2020 2020 AFC U-23 Championship	Uzbekistan	1–2	South Korea	Rangsit, Thailand
17:15	Abdixolikov 21'	Report	Oh Se-hun 5', 71'	Stadium: Thammasat Stadium; Referee: Hiroyuki Kimura (Japan)

19 January 2020 2020 AFC U-23 QF	United Arab Emirates	1–5	Uzbekistan	Rajamangala Stadium, Bangkok
20:15	Z. Al-Ameri 13'	Report	Alijanov 16'; Kobilov 26' (pen.); Bozorov 41'; Yakhshiboev 84'; Tukhtasinov 90+3'	Referee: Fu Ming (China)

22 January 2020 2020 AFC U-23 SF	Saudi Arabia	1–0	Uzbekistan	Rajamangala Stadium, Bangkok
17:15	Al-Hamdan 87'	Report

25 January 2020 2020 AFC U-23 Third place	Australia	1–0	Uzbekistan	Rajamangala Stadium, Bangkok
19:30	D'Agostino 47'

==== 2021 ====
25 March 2021 2021 Antalya Cup	Uzbekistan	0–2	Slovakia	Lara, Turkey
15:00			Trusa 56'; Goljan 80'

27 October 2021 2022 AFC U23 Asian Cup QF	Uzbekistan	2−2	Saudi Arabia	Tashkent, Uzbekistan
15:00 UTC+5	Jurakuziyev 45'; Jaloliddinov 80' (pen.)	Report	Al-Ghamdi 40'; Al-Qahtani 47'	Stadium: Pakhtakor Stadium; Attendance: 571; Referee: Yūsuke Araki

30 October 2021 2022 AFC U23 Asian Cup QF	Uzbekistan	6−0	Bangladesh	Tashkent, Uzbekistan
15:00 UTC+5	Khoshimov 13', 17'; Begimov 14'; Toshtemirov 26'; Fayzullayev 64'; Odilov 89'	Report		Stadium: Pakhtakor Stadium; Attendance: 2,169; Referee: Mohammad Ghabayen

2 November 2021 2022 AFC U23 Asian Cup QF	Kuwait	1−5	Uzbekistan	Tashkent, Uzbekistan
15:00 UTC+5	Naji 65'	Report	Rakhimkulov 37'; Erkinov 45+2', 90+4'; Jaloliddinov 51'; Khoshimov 68' (pen.)	Stadium: Pakhtakor Stadium; Attendance: 213; Referee: Ammar Mahfoodh

==== 2022 ====
23 March 2022 Dubai Cup	Saudi Arabia	2−0	Uzbekistan	Dubai, United Arab Emirates
	Al-Hamdan 25' 42'			Stadium: The Sevens Stadium

26 March 2022 Dubai Cup	Uzbekistan	0−0	United Arab Emirates	Dubai, United Arab Emirates
				Stadium: Police Officers' Club Stadium

29 March 2022 Dubai Cup	Uzbekistan	1−0	Vietnam	Dubai, United Arab Emirates
	Tukhtasinov 63'			Stadium: Al-Awir Stadium

25 May 2022 Friendly	Uzbekistan	2−0	Tajikistan	Tashkent

1 June 2022 2022 AFC U-23 Asian Cup	Uzbekistan	1–0	Turkmenistan	Tashkent, Uzbekistan
20:00 UTC+5	Khoshimov 75' (pen.)	Live Report; Stats Report		Stadium: Milliy Stadium; Attendance: 28,670; Referee: Hanna Hattab (Syria)

4 June 2022 2022 AFC U-23 Asian Cup	Qatar	0–6	Uzbekistan	Tashkent, Uzbekistan
20:00 UTC+5		Live Report; Stats Report	Jaloliddinov 5'; Erkinov 20'; Norchaev 45+1'; Khoshimov 60'; Ayman 63' (o.g.); Jiyanov 67'	Stadium: Pakhtakor Stadium; Attendance: 29,754; Referee: Mohanad Qasim Sarray (Iraq)

7 June 2022 2022 AFC U-23 Asian Cup	Uzbekistan	1–1	Iran	Qarshi, Uzbekistan
22:00 UTC+5	Jurakuziyev 22'	Live Report; Stats Report	Yousefi 62'	Stadium: Markaziy Stadium; Attendance: 19,876; Referee: Ahmed Al-Kaf (Oman)

11 June 2022 2022 AFC U-23 Asian Cup QF	Uzbekistan	2–2 (a.e.t.) (3–2 p)	Iraq	Tashkent, Uzbekistan
21:00 UTC+5	Jaloliddinov 45+5' (pen.); Ammar 50' (o.g.)	Live Report; Stats Report	Ramadhan 19' (pen.); Ghaleb 68'	Stadium: Pakhtakor Stadium; Referee: Mohammed Al-Hoish (Saudi Arabia)
	Penalties
	Jurakuziyev (penalty scored); Khamraliev (penalty missed); Fayzullaev (penalty scored); Buriev (penalty scored)		(penalty scored) Doski; (penalty scored) Naeem; (penalty missed) Ramadhan; (penalty missed) Abdulridha; (penalty missed) Abdulkareem

15 June 2022 2022 AFC U-23 Asian Cup SF	Uzbekistan	2−0	Japan	Tashkent, Uzbekistan
21:00 UTC+5	Jaloliddinov 60'; Norchaev 89'	Live Report; Stats Report		Stadium: Milliy Stadium; Referee: Ahmed Al-Kaf (Oman)

19 June 2022 2022 AFC U-23 Asian Cup Final	Uzbekistan	0−2	Saudi Arabia	Tashkent, Uzbekistan
18:00 UTC+5		Live Report; Stats Report	A. Al-Ghamdi 48'; Al-Buraikan 74'	Stadium: Milliy Stadium; Attendance: 32,268; Referee: Salman Ahmad Falahi (Qatar)

23 September 2022 Friendly match	South Korea	1–1	Uzbekistan	Hwaseong, South Korea
19:00 UTC+9	Kwon Hyeok-kyu 88'	Report	Alisher Odilov 52'	Stadium: Hwaseong Stadium; Attendance: 2,400; Referee: Chae Sang-hyeop (South Korea)

26 September 2022 Friendly match	South Korea	1–1	Uzbekistan	Hwaseong, South Korea
20:00 UTC+9	Cho Hyun-taek 85'	Report	Ruslan Jiyanov 49'	Stadium: Hwaseong Stadium; Attendance: 5,124; Referee: Chae Sang-hyeop (South Korea)

==== 2023 ====
24 March 2023 Friendly match	Ivory Coast	0–0	Uzbekistan	Rabat, Morocco
12:00 UTC+1		Report		Stadium: Moulay Hassan Stadium

27 March 2023 Friendly match	Morocco	3–0	Uzbekistan	Rabat, Morocco
12:30 UTC+1		Report		Stadium: Moulay Hassan Stadium

11 June 2023 Friendly match	Uzbekistan	1–0	Kyrgyzstan	Fergana, Uzbekistan
--:-- UTC+5				Stadium: Istiqlol Stadium

16 June 2023 Friendly match	China	1–3	Uzbekistan	Langfang, China
--:-- UTC+8				Stadium: Langfang Stadium

19 June 2023 Friendly match	China	1–2	Uzbekistan	Langfang, China
--:-- UTC+8				Stadium: Langfang Stadium

6 September 2023 2024 AFC U-23 Asian Cup qualification	Uzbekistan	8–1	Afghanistan	Tashkent, Uzbekistan
19:00 UTC+5	Jaloliddinov 12', 54'; Davronov 36'; Norchaev 47', 53', 87'; Odilov 87'; Khamraliev 90+1'	Report	Musavi 42'	Stadium: JAR Stadium; Referee: Fariq Hitaba (Indonesia)

9 September 2023 2024 AFC U-23 Asian Cup qualification	Hong Kong	0–10	Uzbekistan	Tashkent, Uzbekistan
19:00 UTC+5		Report	Norchaev 6', 59', 69'; Fayzullaev 25'; Odilov 28'; Rakhmonaliev 57' (pen.); Yip Cheuk Man 74' (o.g.); Khoshimov 83', 88', 90+3'	Stadium: JAR Stadium; Attendance: 5,331; Referee: Hanna Hattab (Syria)

12 September 2023 2024 AFC U-23 Asian Cup qualification	Uzbekistan	1–0	Iran	Tashkent, Uzbekistan
19:00 UTC+5	Fayzullaev 43'	Report		Stadium: JAR Stadium; Attendance: 7,952; Referee: Hanna Hattab (Syria)

22 September 2023 2022 Asian Games GS	Hong Kong	0–1	Uzbekistan	Hangzhou, China
19:30 UTC+8		Report	Khoshimov 65'	Stadium: Shangcheng Sports Centre Stadium; Attendance: 7,638; Referee: Ngô Duy Lân (Vietnam)

25 September 2023 2022 Asian Games GS	Uzbekistan	2–1	Hong Kong	Hangzhou, China
16:00 UTC+8	Davronov 64'; Jaloliddinov 70'	Report	Li 4'	Stadium: Shangcheng Sports Centre Stadium; Attendance: 8,784; Referee: Foo Chuan Hui (Singapore)

28 September 2023 2022 Asian Games R16	Uzbekistan	2–0 (a.e.t.)	Indonesia	Hangzhou, China
16:30 UTC+8	Esanov 92', 120+1'	Report		Stadium: Shangcheng Sports Centre Stadium; Attendance: 9,466; Referee: Mohammed Ahmed Al-Shammari (Qatar)

1 October 2023 2022 Asian Games QF	Uzbekistan	2–1	Saudi Arabia	Hangzhou, China
15:00 UTC+8	Mirsaidov 24'; Odilov 43'	Report	Maran 66'	Stadium: Huanglong Sports Centre Stadium; Referee: Ammar Mahfoodh (Bahrain)

4 October 2023 2022 Asian Games SF	South Korea	2–1	Uzbekistan	Hangzhou, China
20:00 UTC+8	Jeong Woo-yeong 3', 38'	Report	Jaloliddinov 25'	Stadium: Huanglong Sports Centre Stadium; Attendance: 38,019; Referee: Ammar Ashkanani (Kuwait)

7 October 2023 2022 Asian Games Bronze medal match	Uzbekistan	4–0	Hong Kong	Hangzhou, China
16:00 UTC+8	Odilov 43'; Norchaev 50', 59'; Davronov 75'	Report		Stadium: Huanglong Sports Centre Stadium; Attendance: 9,825; Referee: Ngô Duy Lân (Vietnam)

13 October 2023 Friendly match	Uzbekistan	0–0	Spain	Tashkent, Uzbekistan
19:00 UTC+5		Report		Stadium: Milliy Stadium; Referee: Asker Najafaliev (Uzbekistan)

16 October 2023 Friendly match	Uzbekistan	1–2	Egypt	Tashkent, Uzbekistan
19:00 UTC+5	Odilov 26'	Report	Mazhar 73'; Farag 89'	Stadium: Milliy Stadium; Referee: Rustam Lutfullin (Uzbekistan)

==== 2024 ====
23 March 2024 Friendly match	Qatar	1–1	Uzbekistan	Doha, Qatar
21:30 UTC+3		Report

26 March 2024 Friendly match	Qatar	1–2	Uzbekistan	Doha, Qatar
22:30 UTC+3		Report

17 April 2024 2024 AFC U-23 Asian Cup GS	Uzbekistan	2–0	Malaysia	Al Rayyan, Qatar
16:00 UTC+3	Jaloliddinov 11' (pen.); Khoshimov 83'	Report		Stadium: Khalifa International Stadium; Attendance: 3,113; Referee: Ahmed Faisal Al-Ali (Jordan)

20 April 2024 2024 AFC U-23 Asian Cup GS	Kuwait	0–5	Uzbekistan	Al Wakrah, Qatar
18:30 UTC+3		Report	Davronov 32'; Khamraliev 49'; Erkinov 55'; Kholmatov 86' (pen.); Norchaev 90+6'	Stadium: Al Janoub Stadium; Attendance: 3,113; Referee: Hanna Hattab (Syria)

23 April 2024 2024 AFC U-23 Asian Cup GS	Uzbekistan	3–0	Vietnam	Al Rayyan, Qatar
18:30 UTC+3	Odilov 4', 40'; Jiyanov 36'	Report		Stadium: Khalifa International Stadium; Attendance: 2,817; Referee: Kim Woo-sung (South Korea)

26 April 2024 2024 AFC U-23 Asian Cup QF	Uzbekistan	2–0	Saudi Arabia	Al Rayyan, Qatar
17:00 UTC+3	Norchaev 45+2'; Rakhmonaliev 84'	Report		Stadium: Khalifa International Stadium; Attendance: 5,379; Referee: Ahmed Faisal Al-Ali (Jordan)

29 April 2024 2024 AFC U-23 Asian Cup SF	Indonesia	0–2	Uzbekistan	Doha, Qatar
17:00 UTC+3		Report	Norchaev 68'; Pratama 86' (o.g.)	Stadium: Abdullah bin Khalifa Stadium; Attendance: 8,792; Referee: Shen Yinhao (China)

3 May 2024 2024 AFC U-23 Asian Cup F	Japan	1–0	Uzbekistan	Al Rayyan, Qatar
18:30 UTC+3	Yamada 90+1'	Report		Stadium: Jassim bin Hamad Stadium; Attendance: 12,276; Referee: Mooud Bonyadifard (Iran)

7 June 2024 Friendly match	Uzbekistan	1–1	Mali	Tashkent, Uzbekistan
19:30 UTC+5	Odilov 23'	Report	Traoré 62'	Stadium: Bunyodkor Stadium; Attendance: 7,500; Referee: Firdavs Norsafarov (Uzbekistan)

10 June 2024 Friendly match	Uzbekistan	1–2	Mali	Tashkent, Uzbekistan
19:00 UTC+5	Norchaev 58'	Report	Diarra 48'; Sameké 89' (pen.)	Stadium: Bunyodkor Stadium; Attendance: 5,723; Referee: Asker Najafaliev (Uzbekistan)

15 July 2024 Friendly match	Guinea	Cancelled	Uzbekistan	Paris, France
18:00 UTC+2		Report		Stadium: Parc des Princes

18 July 2024 Friendly match	Uzbekistan	3–1	New Zealand	Nice, France
17:00 UTC+2	Shomurodov 25'; Urunov 87'; Norchaev 89'	Report	Randall 85'	Stadium: Stade de Nice

24 July 2024 2024 Summer Olympics GS	Uzbekistan	1–2	Spain	Paris, France
15:00 UTC+2	Shomurodov 45+3' (pen.)	Report	Pubill 28'; Gómez 62'	Stadium: Parc des Princes; Attendance: 46,500; Referee: Dahane Beida (Mauritania)

27 July 2024 2024 Summer Olympics GS	Uzbekistan	0–1	Egypt	Nantes, France
17:00 UTC+2		Report	Koka 11'	Stadium: Stade de la Beaujoire; Attendance: 20,658; Referee: Campbell-Kirk Kawana-Waugh (New Zealand)

30 July 2024 2024 Summer Olympics GS	Dominican Republic	1–1	Uzbekistan	Paris, France
15:00 UTC+2	Núñez 51' (pen.)	Report	Odilov 58'	Stadium: Parc des Princes; Attendance: 30,475; Referee: Mahmood Ali Ismail (Sudan)

=== U-22 ===
==== 2011 ====
2011-02-22 Friendly	Shakhtar Donetsk Youth Team (Ukraine)	2–2	Uzbekistan	UAE
			Karimov 26'; Turaev 69'

2011-02-20 Friendly	FC Neman Grodno (Belarus)	2–3	Uzbekistan	UAE
			75' Alisher Azizov; 89' Fozil Musaev; 90+2' Alisher Azizov

2011-02-23 Friendly	FC Banants (Armenia)	0–3	Uzbekistan	UAE
			40' Fozil Musaev; 89' Jasur Khasanov; 86' Zokhir Pirimov

2011-02-24 Friendly	FC Krylia Sovetov Samara (Russia)	2–1	Uzbekistan	UAE
	Savin 6'; Joseph Di Chiara 41'		58' Boymatov

2011-03-26 Friendly match	Uzbekistan	1–2	Japan	Pakhtakor Markaziy Stadium, Tashkent
	Valijonov 82'		(yellow card) 44' Hamada; 76' Higashi; 78' Nagai	Referee: Valentin Kovalenko

2011-03-29 Friendly match	Uzbekistan	1–0	Japan	JAR Stadium, Tashkent
15:00 UTC+04:00	Khojiakbarov 13'		(yellow card) 46' Yuki Otsu	Referee: Ravshan Irmatov

2011-05-27 Inter. tournament	Uzbekistan	0–1	Albania	Insbruck
			Vajushi

2011-05-30 Inter. tournament	Uzbekistan	2–0	Israel	Insbruck
	2'; 88'

2011-06-06 Inter. tournament	Uzbekistan	3–0	Slovenia	Insbruck

2011-06-14 Friendly	Uzbekistan	2–1	Syria U-23	JAR Stadium, Tashkent
19:00 UTC+05	Turaev 5'; Karimov 10'		89' Uday al Jahal	Referee: Vladislav Zeytlin

2011-07-10 Friendly	FC Dynamo Moscow (Russia)	1–1	Uzbekistan	Lienz, Austria
	Igor Semshov 41'; Luke Wilkshire (yellow card) 45'; Luke Wilkshire (yellow card) 62'; Igor Semshov (yellow card) 73'		49' Oleg Zoteev

2011-07-12 Friendly	FC Rostov (Russia)	3–2	Uzbekistan	Austria
	Adamov 7'; Adamov 20'; Yankov 35'		50' Shadrin; 88' Shadrin

2011-07-14 Friendly	CFR Cluj (Romania)	1–0	Uzbekistan	Austria
	Rada 72'

2011-07-15 Friendly	Manisaspor (Turkey)	4–1	Uzbekistan	Austria
	Promise 15'; Simpson 17'; Makukula 51'; 88'		47'(o.g.) Güven

2011-07-16 Friendly	FC Red Bull Salzburg Juniors (Austria)	0–1	Uzbekistan	Austria

2011-08-09 V.Lobanovsky tourn.	Uzbekistan	2–0	Serbia	Lobanovsky Dynamo Stadium, Kyiv
	57'; 60'

2011-08-10 V.Lobanovsky tourn.	Ukraine	0–0 (7–8 p)	Uzbekistan	Lobanovsky Dynamo Stadium, Kyiv
	Yeremenko (yellow card) 90'
	Penalties
	Harmash (penalty scored); Tkachuk (penalty scored); Kryvtsov (penalty scored); Yeremenko (penalty scored); Bezus (penalty scored); Hrechyshkin (penalty scored); Putrash (penalty scored); Babyr (penalty missed)		(penalty scored) I.Tuhtahujaev; (penalty scored) A.Ismatullaev; (penalty scored) F.Musaev; (penalty scored) K.Turaev; (penalty scored) V.Mochalov; (penalty scored) Karimov; (penalty scored) S.Mustafoev; (penalty scored) A.Khojiakbarov

2011-09-11 Friendly	Uzbekistan	1–0	Oman	JAR Stadium, Tashkent
	T.Abdukholiqov 15'	Report		Referee: I.Khudoydotov

2011-09-15 Friendly	Uzbekistan	1–1	(Uzbekistan) Mash'al Mubarek	JAR Stadium, Tashkent
	J.Khasanov 90+1'	Report	41' Shodmonov

2011-10-08 Friendly	South Korea	5–1	Uzbekistan	South Korea
			58' T.Abdukholiqov

2011-10-19 VFF Cup	Uzbekistan	3–1	Malaysia	Mỹ Đình National Stadium, Hanoi
17:00	Pavel Smolyachenko 54'; Abduqakhor Khojiakbarov 76'; Oybek Qilichev 88' (pen.)	Report	90+1' Mohd Fandi Othman

2011-10-21 VFF Cup	Uzbekistan	1–1	Vietnam	Mỹ Đình National Stadium, Hanoi
19:15	Pavel Smolyachenko 52'		55'

2011-10-23 VFF Cup	Myanmar	1–2	Uzbekistan	Mỹ Đình National Stadium, Hanoi
17:10	35'		12' Alsiher Shog'ulomov; 15' Pavel Smolyachenko

2011-11-17 Friendly	Bahrain	1–1	Uzbekistan	Bahrain National Stadium
19:30	48'		89' Oleg Zoteev

==== 2014 ====
2013 AFC U-22 Championship

12 January 2014 Group stage	Uzbekistan	2–1	China	Seeb Stadium, Seeb
17:00	Krimets 90+2'; Sergeev 90+4'	Report	Yang Chaosheng 35'	Attendance: 80; Referee: Kim Jong-Hyeok (Korea Republic)

14 January 2014 Group stage	Iraq	2–1	Uzbekistan	Seeb Stadium, Seeb
17:00	Marwan 10'; Nadhim 38'	Report	Iskanderov 64'	Attendance: 510; Referee: Mohd Amirul Izwan Bin Yaacob (Malaysia)

16 January 2014 Group stage	Saudi Arabia	1–0	Uzbekistan	Seeb Stadium, Seeb
20:00	Al Sudani 60'	Report		Attendance: 127; Referee: Muhammad Taqi Aljaafari Bin Jahari (Singapore)

==== 2015 ====
1 February 2015 2015 King's Cup	Uzbekistan	0–1	South Korea	80th Birthday Stadium, Nakhon Ratchasima
			Song Ju-hun 22'	Referee: (Thailand) Sivakorn Pu-Udom

4 February 2015 2015 King's Cup	Uzbekistan	5–2	Thailand	80th Birthday Stadium, Nakhon Ratchasima
	Sardor Sabirkhodjaev 32'; Jamshid Iskanderov 44'; Maksimilian Fomin 78'; Abbosbek Makhstaliev 81'; Igor Sergeev 88'		Pokklaw Anan 8', 70'	Referee: (Vietnam) Phung Dinh Dung

7 February 2015 2015 King's Cup	Uzbekistan	2–4	Honduras	80th Birthday Stadium, Nakhon Ratchasima
	Diyorjon Turapov 6'; Jeffri Flores 90+3' (o.g.)		Jhow Benavidez 11' (pen.), 34' (pen.); Alberth Elis 35', 74'	Referee: (Thailand) Anuwat Feemuechang

14 March 2015 Friendly	Vietnam	0–0	Uzbekistan	Ho Chi Minh City, Vietnam
				Stadium: Thống Nhất Stadium

27 March 2015 2016 AFC U-23 Championship qualification	Uzbekistan	2–0	India	Bangabandhu National Stadium, Dhaka
15:00	Sergeev 87'; Kozak 90+2'	Report		Attendance: 1,000; Referee: Tan Hai (China)

29 March 2015 2016 AFC U-23 Championship qualification	Bangladesh	0–4	Uzbekistan	Bangabandhu National Stadium, Dhaka
18:00		Report	Masharipov 4'; Rakhmanov 12', 29'; Makhstaliev 40'	Attendance: 1,500; Referee: Fahad Al-Mirdasi (Saudi Arabia)

31 March 2015 2016 AFC U-23 Championship qualification	Syria	2–1	Uzbekistan	Bangabandhu National Stadium, Dhaka
15:00	Khribin 29', 45+2' (pen.)	Report	Makhstaliev 59'	Attendance: 300; Referee: Fahad Al-Mirdasi (Saudi Arabia)

30 August 2015 Friendly	Uzbekistan	1–0	United Arab Emirates	Trnava, Slovakia
	B.Yuldashov 82'

1 September 2015 Friendly	Uzbekistan	1–3	Saudi Arabia	Trnava, Slovakia
	Urinboev

3 September 2015 Friendly	Uzbekistan	1–1	United Arab Emirates	Trnava, Slovakia
	T.Khakimov

8 September 2015 Friendly	Uzbekistan	0–0	Saudi Arabia	Trnava, Slovakia

20 December 2015 Friendly	Uzbekistan	4–2	North Korea	Dubai
	Sergeev 27' (pen.), 40'; Gafurov 53'; I.Alibaev 79'

23 December 2015 Friendly	Uzbekistan	0–1	Syria	Dubai

23 December 2015 Friendly	Uzbekistan	2–0	Qatar	Dubai
	A.Komilov 73'; D.Tursunov 90'

==== 2017 ====
23 March 2017 Friendly	Qatar	1–3	Uzbekistan	Doha
			Z.Urinboev 1', 55', 60'

25 March 2017 Friendly	Canada	1–0	Uzbekistan	Doha

27 May 2017 Friendly	Uzbekistan	3–4	Russia	Olmaliq

13 June 2017 Friendly	Uzbekistan	v	China	China

15 July 2017 2018 AFC U-23 Championship qualification	Uzbekistan	3–1	Lebanon	Tahnoun bin Mohammed Stadium, Al Ain
21:15	Khamis 20' (o.g.); Abdixolikov 30', 38'	Report	Hammoud 58'	Attendance: 50; Referee: Takuto Okabe (Japan)

17 July 2017 2018 AFC U-23 Championship qualification	Nepal	0–2	Uzbekistan	Tahnoun bin Mohammed Stadium, Al Ain
18:25		Report	Tursunov 21'; Ganiev 80'	Attendance: 1,825; Referee: Ahmed Al-Ali (Jordan)

19 July 2017 2018 AFC U-23 Championship qualification	United Arab Emirates	0–2	Uzbekistan	Tahnoun bin Mohammed Stadium, Al Ain
18:25		Report	Kobilov 67'; Sidikov 90'	Attendance: 1,250; Referee: Ahmed Al-Ali (Jordan)

2012 Summer Olympics Qualification

2011-06-19 2012 Summer Olympics	Uzbekistan	1–0	Hong Kong	JAR Stadium, Tashkent
19:30 UTC+05	Musaev 59'	Report

2011-06-23 2012 Summer Olympics	Hong Kong	0–2	Uzbekistan	Hong Kong Stadium, Hong Kong
		Report	Musaev 8'; Abdukholikov 18'

2011-09-21 2012 Summer Olympics	Uzbekistan	2–0	Iraq	JAR Stadium, Tashkent
18:00 UTC+05:00	Abdukholiqov 71'; Turaev 78'	Report		Attendance: 7,223; Referee: Kim Dong-Jin (South Korea)

2011-11-23 2012 Summer Olympics	United Arab Emirates	0–0	Uzbekistan	Sheikh Khalifa International Stadium, Al Ain

27 November 2011 2012 Summer Olympics	Australia	0–0	Uzbekistan	Parramatta Stadium, Parramatta
19:15 UTC+11:00		Report		Attendance: 2,604; Referee: Abdullah Al Hilali (Oman)

=== U-21 ===
==== 2012 ====
2013 AFC U-22 Asian Cup qualification

18 June 2012	Bangladesh	1–2	Uzbekistan	Dasarath Rangasala Stadium, Kathmandu
15:30	Emon 55' (pen.)	Report	Smolyachenko 40'; Gadoev 74'	Attendance: 500; Referee: Pratap Singh (India)

20 June 2012	Uzbekistan	4–2	Nepal	Dasarath Rangasala Stadium, Kathmandu
18:30	Gadoev 7', 56'; Abdukholiqov 9', 86'	Report	Anil 33'; Sujal 42'	Attendance: 3,200; Referee: Ma Ning (China)

22 June 2012	Yemen	1–1	Uzbekistan	Dasarath Rangasala Stadium, Kathmandu
15:30	Sadam 41'	Report	Abdukholiqov 45+1'	Attendance: 250; Referee: Masoud Tufaylieh (Syria)

24 June 2012	Uzbekistan	1–3	Jordan	Dasarath Rangasala Stadium, Kathmandu
18:30	Abdukholiqov 32'	Report	Zahran 82', 87'; Bani Attiah 90+5'	Attendance: 300; Referee: Ma Ning (China)

== See also ==
- 2012 Uzbekistan national football team results
