= 2022 AFC U-23 Asian Cup =

2022 yilgi U-23 Osiyo Kubogi

Tournament details
- Host country: Uzbekistan
- Dates: 1–19 June
- Teams: 16 (from 1 confederation)
- Venues: 4 (in 2 host cities)

Final positions
- Champions: Saudi Arabia (1st title)
- Runners-up: Uzbekistan
- Third place: Japan
- Fourth place: Australia

Tournament statistics
- Matches played: 32
- Goals scored: 81 (2.53 per match)
- Attendance: 154,184 (4,818 per match)
- Top scorer(s): (Japan) Yuito Suzuki (Saudi Arabia) Ayman Yahya (South Korea) Cho Young-wook (Note: Playing fewer minutes than the other players but still scoring 3 goals, Cho Young-wook won the tournament's top scorer award.) (Thailand) Suphanat Mueanta (Uzbekistan) Jasurbek Jaloliddinov (3 goals each)
- Best player: (Saudi Arabia) Ayman Yahya
- Best goalkeeper: (Saudi Arabia) Nawaf Al-Aqidi
- Fair play award: Saudi Arabia

The 2022 AFC U-23 Asian Cup was the 5th edition of the AFC U-23 Asian Cup (prior to 2021 known as the AFC U-23 Championship), a biennial international age-restricted football championship organised by the Asian Football Confederation (AFC) for the men's under-23 national teams of Asia. The players had to be born on or after 1 January 1999.

The tournament was originally going to be held in Uzbekistan from 6–24 January 2022, but was postponed due to the COVID-19 pandemic, and rescheduled to 1–19 June 2022. A total of 16 teams competed in the tournament.

South Korea were the defending champions, but were eliminated by Japan in the quarter-finals, failing to finish among the top 4 for the first time. Saudi Arabia became the fifth different country to win the tournament, beating hosts Uzbekistan in the final.

== Host selection ==
Originally, it was determined that China would host the tournament, as a preparatory competition ahead of the 2023 AFC Asian Cup. However, they withdrew from hosting the tournament in October 2020 due to scheduling conflicts, stadium completion timelines ahead of other international events and challenges created by the COVID-19 pandemic. On 18 March 2021, the AFC announced that Uzbekistan will host the tournament.

== Qualification ==
Qualification matches were played between 23 October and 2 November 2021.

=== Qualified teams ===
Team	Qualified as	Appearance	Previous best performance
Uzbekistan	Hosts	5th	Champions (2018)
Qatar	Group A winners	4th	Third place (2018)
Iran	Group B winners	4th	Quarter-finals (2016)
Iraq	Group C winners	5th	Champions (2013)
Kuwait	Group D winners	2nd	Group stage (2013)
United Arab Emirates	Group E winners	4th	Quarter-finals (2013, 2016, 2020)
Jordan	Group F winners	5th	Third place (2013)
Australia	Group G winners	5th	Third place (2020)
South Korea	Group H winners	5th	Champions (2020)
Vietnam	Group I winners	4th	Runners-up (2018)
Malaysia	Group J winners	2nd	Quarter-finals (2018)
Japan	Group K winners	5th	Champions (2016)
Thailand	1st best runners-up	4th	Quarter-finals (2020)
Saudi Arabia	2nd best runners-up	5th	Runners-up (2013, 2020)
Turkmenistan	3rd best runners-up	1st	Debut
Tajikistan	4th best runners-up	1st	Debut

== Venues ==
Tashkent			2022 AFC U-23 Asian Cup is located in Uzbekistan	Qarshi
Milliy Stadium	Pakhtakor Stadium	Lokomotiv Stadium	2022 AFC U-23 Asian Cup is located in Uzbekistan	Markaziy Stadium
Capacity: 34,000	Capacity: 35,000	Capacity: 8,000	2022 AFC U-23 Asian Cup is located in Uzbekistan	Capacity: 21,000

== Match officials ==
The following referees and assistant referees were appointed for the tournament. Video assistant referees were used in this tournament.

Referees

- (Australia) Jonathan Barreiro
- (Australia) Shaun Evans
- (Australia) Alex King
- (China) Fu Ming
- (China) Ma Ning
- (Iraq) Ali Sabah
- (Iraq) Mohanad Qasim Sarray
- (Japan) Yusuke Araki
- (Japan) Jumpei Iida
- (Japan) Yudai Yamamoto
- (South Korea) Kim Hee-gon
- (South Korea) Kim Woo-sung
- (Kuwait) Ahmad Faisal Al-Ali
- (Kuwait) Ammar Ashkanani
- (Kuwait) Ali Shaban
- (Oman) Ahmed Al-Kaf
- (Qatar) Abdulla Al-Marri
- (Qatar) Saoud Ali Al-Adba
- (Qatar) Salman Ahmad Falahi
- (Saudi Arabia) Mohammed Al-Hoaish
- (Saudi Arabia) Majed Al Shamrani
- (Saudi Arabia) Khalid Al-Turais
- (Singapore) Muhammad Taqi
- (Sri Lanka) Hettikamkanamge Perera
- (Syria) Hanna Hattab
- (Thailand) Mongkolchai Pechsri
- (Thailand) Sivakorn Pu-udom
- (United Arab Emirates) Omar Mohammed Al-Ali
- (United Arab Emirates) Yahya Ali Al-Mulla
- (United Arab Emirates) Adel Al-Naqbi
- (Uzbekistan) Aziz Asimov
- (Uzbekistan) Akhrol Riskullaev
- (Uzbekistan) Rustam Lutfullin
- (Uzbekistan) Ilgiz Tantashev

Assistant referees

- (Australia) Owen Goldrick
- (Australia) George Lakrindis
- (China) Cao Yi
- (China) Shi Xiang
- (Iraq) Watheq Al-Swaiedi
- (Iraq) Haider Ali Al-Ubaidee
- (Japan) Isao Nishihashi
- (Japan) Takumi Takagi
- (South Korea) Jang Jong-pil
- (South Korea) Song Bong-keun
- (Kuwait) Abdulhadi Al-Anezi
- (Kuwait) Abbas Gholoum
- (Oman) Abu Bakar Al-Amri
- (Oman) Rashid Al-Ghaithi
- (Qatar) Yousuf Al-Shamari
- (Qatar) Zahy Al-Shammari
- (Saudi Arabia) Khalaf Al-Shammari
- (Saudi Arabia) Yasir Al-Sultan
- (Sri Lanka) Palitha Hemathunga
- (Syria) Ali Ahmad
- (Thailand) Tanate Chuchuen
- (Thailand) Rawut Nakarit
- (United Arab Emirates) Sabet Al-Ali
- (United Arab Emirates) Ali Al-Nuaimi
- (Uzbekistan) Andrey Tsapenko

== Draw ==
The 16 teams were drawn into four groups of four teams, with seeding based on their performance at the 2020 AFC U-23 Championship. The draw took place at the Milliy Stadium at 12:00 PM, February 17.

Pot 1	Pot 2	Pot 3	Pot 4
1. Uzbekistan (hosts); 2. South Korea; 3. Saudi Arabia; 4. Australia	5. Jordan; 6. Thailand; 7. United Arab Emirates; 8. Iran	9. Iraq; 10. Qatar; 11. Vietnam; 12. Japan	13. Tajikistan; 14. Malaysia; 15. Kuwait; 16. Turkmenistan

== Squads ==
Players born on or after 1 January 1999 are eligible to compete in the tournament. Each team have to register a squad of minimum 18 players and maximum 23 players, a minimum three of whom must be selected as goalkeepers (Regulations Article 26.3).

== Group stage ==
The top two teams of each group advance to the quarter-finals.

Tiebreakers

Teams are ranked according to points (3 points for a win, 1 point for a draw, 0 points for a loss), and if tied on points, the following tiebreaking criteria are applied, in the order given, to determine the rankings (Regulations Article 9.3):

1. Points in head-to-head matches among tied teams;
2. Goal difference in head-to-head matches among tied teams;
3. Goals scored in head-to-head matches among tied teams;
4. If more than two teams are tied, and after applying all head-to-head criteria above, a subset of teams are still tied, all head-to-head criteria above are reapplied exclusively to this subset of teams;
5. Goal difference in all group matches;
6. Goals scored in all group matches;
7. Penalty shoot-out if only two teams are tied and they met in the last round of the group;
8. Disciplinary points (yellow card = 1 point, red card as a result of two yellow cards = 3 points, direct red card = 3 points, yellow card followed by direct red card = 4 points);
9. Drawing of lots.

All times are local, UT (UTC+5).

=== Group A ===
Pos	Team	Pld	W	D	L	GF	GA	GD	Pts	Qualification
1	Uzbekistan (H)	3	2	1	0	8	1	+7	7	Knockout stage
2	Turkmenistan	3	1	1	1	4	4	0	4	Knockout stage
3	Iran	3	0	2	1	3	4	−1	2	
4	Qatar	3	0	2	1	3	9	−6	2	

Source: AFC
Rules for classification: Group stage tiebreakers
(H) Hosts
1 June 2022
18:00

Iran	1–1	Qatar
Shahriari 90'	Live Report; Stats Report	Al-Ganehi 87'

Milliy Stadium, Tashkent
Attendance: 965
Referee: Yusuke Araki (Japan)
1 June 2022
20:30

Uzbekistan	1–0	Turkmenistan
Khoshimov 75' (pen.)	Live Report; Stats Report

Pakhtakor Stadium, Tashkent
Attendance: 28,670
Referee: Hanna Hattab (Syria)

4 June 2022
18:00

Turkmenistan	2–1	Iran
Sapargulýyew 28' (pen.); T. Çaryýew 80'	Live Report; Stats Report	Bavieh 8'

Milliy Stadium, Tashkent
Attendance: 539
Referee: Alex King (Australia)
4 June 2022
20:00

Qatar	0–6	Uzbekistan
	Live Report; Stats Report	Jaloliddinov 5'; Erkinov 20'; Norchaev 45+1'; Khoshimov 60'; Ayman 63' (o.g.); Jiyanov 67'

Pakhtakor Stadium, Tashkent
Attendance: 29,754
Referee: Mohanad Qasim Sarray (Iraq)

7 June 2022
22:00

Uzbekistan	1–1	Iran
Jurakuziyev 22'	Live Report; Stats Report	Yousefi 62'

Markaziy Stadium, Qarshi
Attendance: 19,876
Referee: Ahmed Al-Kaf (Oman)
7 June 2022
22:00

Qatar	2–2	Turkmenistan
Al-Tairi 65', 73'	Live Report; Stats Report	Myradow 75', 82'

Milliy Stadium, Tashkent
Attendance: 365
Referee: Ma Ning (China)

=== Group B ===
Pos	Team	Pld	W	D	L	GF	GA	GD	Pts	Qualification
1	Australia	3	2	1	0	4	1	+3	7	Knockout stage
2	Iraq	3	1	2	0	5	3	+2	5	Knockout stage
3	Jordan	3	1	1	1	2	2	0	4	
4	Kuwait	3	0	0	3	1	6	−5	0	

Source: AFC
Rules for classification: Group stage tiebreakers
1 June 2022
18:00

Australia	2–0	Kuwait
D'Arrigo 26'; Rich-Baghuelou 54'	Live Report; Stats Report

Markaziy Stadium, Qarshi
Attendance: 675
Referee: Adel Al-Naqbi (United Arab Emirates)
1 June 2022
22:00

Jordan	1–1	Iraq
Aburiziq 57'	Live Report; Stats Report	Ramadhan 69'

Markaziy Stadium, Qarshi
Attendance: 417
Referee: Khalid Al-Turais (Saudi Arabia)

4 June 2022
18:00

Iraq	1–1	Australia
Abdulkareem 56'	Live Report; Stats Report	Kuol 45+2'

Markaziy Stadium, Qarshi
Attendance: 492
Referee: Akhrol Riskullaev (Uzbekistan)
4 June 2022
22:00

Kuwait	0–1	Jordan
	Live Report; Stats Report	Aburiziq 68'

Markaziy Stadium, Qarshi
Attendance: 315
Referee: Ahmed Al-Kaf (Oman)

7 June 2022
18:00

Australia	1–0	Jordan
Najjarine 61' (pen.)	Live Report; Stats Report

Lokomotiv Stadium, Tashkent
Attendance: 164
Referee: Yudai Yamamoto (Japan)
7 June 2022
18:00

Iraq	3–1	Kuwait
Muntadher 35'; Abdul-Ridha 59'; Al-Baqer 82'	Live Report; Stats Report	Ayedh 12'

Markaziy Stadium, Qarshi
Attendance: 1,850
Referee: Omar Al-Ali (United Arab Emirates)

=== Group C ===
Pos	Team	Pld	W	D	L	GF	GA	GD	Pts	Qualification
1	South Korea	3	2	1	0	6	2	+4	7	Knockout stage
2	Vietnam	3	1	2	0	5	3	+2	5	Knockout stage
3	Thailand	3	1	1	1	5	3	+2	4	
4	Malaysia	3	0	0	3	1	9	−8	0	

Source: AFC
Rules for classification: Group stage tiebreakers
2 June 2022
18:00

South Korea	4–1	Malaysia
Lee Sang-min 31'; Kim Tae-hwan 48'; Cho Young-wook 88', 90+2'	Live Report; Stats Report	Mukhairi 83'

Lokomotiv Stadium, Tashkent
Attendance: 290
Referee: Saoud Ali Al-Adba (Qatar)
2 June 2022
20:00

Thailand	2–2	Vietnam
Davis 34'; Suphanat 90+1'	Live Report; Stats Report	Phan Tuấn Tài 1'; Nguyễn Văn Tùng 73'

Milliy Stadium, Tashkent
Attendance: 278
Referee: Ma Ning (China)

5 June 2022
18:00

Vietnam	1–1	South Korea
Vũ Tiến Long 83'	Live Report; Stats Report	Cho Young-wook 63'

Lokomotiv Stadium, Tashkent
Attendance: 255
Referee: Ahmad Faisal Al-Ali (Kuwait)
5 June 2022
20:00

Malaysia	0–3	Thailand
	Live Report; Stats Report	Suphanat 23', 73'; Channarong 69'

Milliy Stadium, Tashkent
Attendance: 212
Referee: Mohammed Al-Hoaish (Saudi Arabia)

8 June 2022
18:00

South Korea	1–0	Thailand
Go Jae-hyun 35'	Live Report; Stats Report

Pakhtakor Stadium, Tashkent
Attendance: 350
Referee: Salman Ahmad Falahi (Qatar)
8 June 2022
18:00

Vietnam	2–0	Malaysia
Nhâm Mạnh Dũng 28'; Bùi Hoàng Việt Anh 45+8'	Live Report; Stats Report

Lokomotiv Stadium, Tashkent
Attendance: 140
Referee: Hettikamkanamge Perera (Sri Lanka)

=== Group D ===
Pos	Team	Pld	W	D	L	GF	GA	GD	Pts	Qualification
1	Saudi Arabia	3	2	1	0	7	0	+7	7	Knockout stage
2	Japan	3	2	1	0	5	1	+4	7	Knockout stage
3	United Arab Emirates	3	1	0	2	3	4	−1	3	
4	Tajikistan	3	0	0	3	0	10	−10	0	

Source: AFC
Rules for classification: Group stage tiebreakers
3 June 2022
18:00

United Arab Emirates	1–2	Japan
Hassan 63'	Live Report; Stats Report	Y. Suzuki 61'; Hosoya 76'

Pakhtakor Stadium, Tashkent
Attendance: 270
Referee: Hettikamkanamge Perera (Sri Lanka)
3 June 2022
20:00

Saudi Arabia	5–0	Tajikistan
Al-Yami 42'; Yahya 50'; Asiri 68'; Al-Harbi 86'; Radif 90+7' (pen.)	Live Report; Stats Report

Lokomotiv Stadium, Tashkent
Attendance: 280
Referee: Kim Hee-gon (South Korea)

6 June 2022
18:00

Japan	0–0	Saudi Arabia
	Live Report; Stats Report

Pakhtakor Stadium, Tashkent
Attendance: 300
Referee: Ali Sabah (Iraq)
6 June 2022
20:00

Tajikistan	0–2	United Arab Emirates
	Live Report; Stats Report	Al-Bloushi 12'; Saeed 78' (pen.)

Lokomotiv Stadium, Tashkent
Attendance: 185
Referee: Mongkolchai Pechsri (Thailand)

9 June 2022
18:00

Saudi Arabia	2–0	United Arab Emirates
Yahya 57'; Abdulhamid 90+3' (pen.)	Live Report; Stats Report

Lokomotiv Stadium, Tashkent
Attendance: 135
Referee: Jonathan Barreiro (Australia)
9 June 2022
18:00

Japan	3–0	Tajikistan
Matsuki 11'; Sato 56'; Nakashima 90+4'	Live Report; Stats Report

Milliy Stadium, Tashkent
Attendance: 375
Referee: Ali Shaban (Kuwait)

== Knockout stage ==
In the knockout stage, extra time and penalty shoot-out were used to decide the winner if necessary (Regulations Articles 10.1 and 10.3).

=== Bracket ===
Quarter-finals
11 June – Tashkent (Pakhtakor)
Uzbekistan (p)	2 (3)
Iraq	2 (2)
12 June – Tashkent (Pakhtakor)
South Korea	0
Japan	3
11 June – Tashkent (Milliy)
Australia	1
Turkmenistan	0
12 June – Tashkent (Lokomotiv)
Saudi Arabia	2
Vietnam	0

Semi-finals
15 June – Tashkent (Milliy)
Uzbekistan	2
Japan	0
15 June – Tashkent (Pakhtakor)
Australia	0
Saudi Arabia	2

Final
19 June – Tashkent (Milliy)
Uzbekistan	0
Saudi Arabia	2
Third place play-off
18 June – Tashkent (Pakhtakor)
Japan	3
Australia	0

=== Quarter-finals ===
11 June 2022
18:00

Australia	1–0	Turkmenistan
Orazow 74' (o.g.)	Live Report; Stats Report

Milliy Stadium, Tashkent
Attendance: 247
Referee: Salman Ahmad Falahi (Qatar)

11 June 2022
21:00

Uzbekistan	2–2 (a.e.t.)	Iraq
Jaloliddinov 45+5' (pen.); Ammar 50' (o.g.)	Live Report; Stats Report	Ramadhan 19' (pen.); Ghaleb 68'
Penalties
Jurakuziyev (penalty scored); Khamraliev (penalty missed); Fayzullaev (penalty scored); Buriev (penalty scored)	3–2	(penalty scored) Doski; (penalty scored) Naeem; (penalty missed) Ramadhan; (penalty missed) Abdul-Ridha; (penalty missed) Abdulkareem

Pakhtakor Stadium, Tashkent
Attendance: 32,700
Referee: Mohammed Al-Hoaish (Saudi Arabia)

12 June 2022
18:00

South Korea	0–3	Japan
	Live Report; Stats Report	Y. Suzuki 22', 80'; Hosoya 65'

Pakhtakor Stadium, Tashkent
Attendance: 529
Referee: Hanna Hattab (Syria)

12 June 2022
21:00

Saudi Arabia	2–0	Vietnam
Al-Harbi 41'; Al-Buraikan 65'	Live Report; Stats Report

Lokomotiv Stadium, Tashkent
Attendance: 685
Referee: Yusuke Araki (Japan)

=== Semi-finals ===
15 June 2022
18:00

Australia	0–2	Saudi Arabia
	Live Report; Stats Report	Al-Eisa 20'; Yahya 72'

Pakhtakor Stadium, Tashkent
Attendance: 323
Referee: Mohanad Qasim Sarray (Iraq)

15 June 2022
21:00

Uzbekistan	2–0	Japan
Jaloliddinov 60'; Norchaev 89'	Live Report; Stats Report

Milliy Stadium, Tashkent
Attendance: 50
Referee: Ahmed Al-Kaf (Oman)

=== Third place play-off ===
18 June 2022
18:00

Japan	3–0	Australia
Sato 7'; Trewin 39' (o.g.); Fujio 63'	Live Report; Stats Report

Pakhtakor Stadium, Tashkent
Attendance: 230
Referee: Kim Hee-gon (South Korea)

=== Final ===
19 June 2022
18:00

Uzbekistan	0–2	Saudi Arabia
	Live Report; Stats Report	A. Al-Ghamdi 48'; Al-Buraikan 74'

Milliy Stadium, Tashkent
Attendance: 32,268
Referee: Salman Ahmad Falahi (Qatar)

== Winners ==
2022 AFC U-23 Asian Cup
(Saudi Arabia)
Saudi Arabia
1st title

== Awards ==
The following awards were given at the conclusion of the tournament:

Top scorer	Best player	Best goalkeeper	Fair-play award
(South Korea) Cho Young-wook	(Saudi Arabia) Ayman Yahya	(Saudi Arabia) Nawaf Al-Aqidi	Saudi Arabia

== Goalscorers ==
There were 81 goals scored in 32 matches, for an average of 2.53 goals per match.

3 goals

- (Japan) Yuito Suzuki
- (Saudi Arabia) Ayman Yahya
- (South Korea) Cho Young-wook
- (Thailand) Suphanat Mueanta
- (Uzbekistan) Jasurbek Jaloliddinov

2 goals

- (Iraq) Wakaa Ramadhan
- (Japan) Mao Hosoya
- (Japan) Kein Sato
- (Jordan) Mohammad Aburiziq
- (Qatar) Osamah Al-Tairi
- (Saudi Arabia) Firas Al-Buraikan
- (Saudi Arabia) Moteb Al-Harbi
- (Turkmenistan) Begençmyrat Myradow
- (Uzbekistan) Ulugbek Khoshimov
- (Uzbekistan) Khusayin Norchaev

1 goal

- (Australia) Louis D'Arrigo
- (Australia) Alou Kuol
- (Australia) Ramy Najjarine
- (Australia) Jay Rich-Baghuelou
- (Iran) Alireza Bavieh
- (Iran) Erfan Shahriari
- (Iran) Arya Yousefi
- (Iraq) Hasan Abdulkareem
- (Iraq) Moamel Abdul-Ridha
- (Iraq) Mohammed Al-Baqer
- (Iraq) Ammar Ghaleb
- (Iraq) Muntadher Mohammed
- (Japan) Shota Fujio
- (Japan) Kuryu Matsuki
- (Japan) Taika Nakashima
- (Kuwait) Yousef Ayedh
- (Malaysia) Mukhairi Ajmal
- (Qatar) Ahmed Al Ganehi
- (Saudi Arabia) Saud Abdulhamid
- (Saudi Arabia) Hussain Al-Eisa
- (Saudi Arabia) Ahmed Al-Ghamdi
- (Saudi Arabia) Hamad Al-Yami
- (Saudi Arabia) Haitham Asiri
- (Saudi Arabia) Abdullah Radif
- (South Korea) Go Jae-hyun
- (South Korea) Kim Tae-hwan
- (South Korea) Lee Sang-min
- (Thailand) Ben Davis
- (Thailand) Channarong Promsrikaew
- (Turkmenistan) Teýmur Çaryýew
- (Turkmenistan) Arzuwguly Sapargulýyew
- (United Arab Emirates) Abdelaziz Al-Bloushi
- (United Arab Emirates) Yaser Hassan
- (United Arab Emirates) Mansoor Saeed
- (Uzbekistan) Khojimat Erkinov
- (Uzbekistan) Ruslanbek Jiyanov
- (Uzbekistan) Otabek Jurakuziyev
- (Vietnam) Bùi Hoàng Việt Anh
- (Vietnam) Nguyễn Văn Tùng
- (Vietnam) Nhâm Mạnh Dũng
- (Vietnam) Phan Tuấn Tài (Note: Fastest goal in the tournament)
- (Vietnam) Vũ Tiến Long

1 own goal

- (Australia) Kai Trewin (against Japan)
- (Iraq) Hussein Ammar (against Uzbekistan)
- (Qatar) Yousef Ayman (against Uzbekistan)
- (Turkmenistan) Oraz Orazow (against Australia)

== Broadcasting ==
Country	Broadcast network	Channel	Online platform
Australia	Network 10	10 Sports	My Football
Bangladesh	East West Media Group	T Sports	T Sports
China	iQIYI, Migu Video		iQIYI, Migu Video
Chinese Taipei	ELTA TV	ELTA HD	ELTA Sports
Thailand	True Digital Group		TrueID
Hong Kong	Aser Ventures	Eleven Sports	Eleven Sports
Philippines	Aser Ventures	Eleven Sports	Eleven Sports
Singapore	Aser Ventures	Eleven Sports	Eleven Sports
India	Jio	Jio TV	JioTV
Indonesia	MNC Media	MNCTV, RCTI, iNews	MNCTV OFFICIAL, MNC Media
Iraq	MENA	Al Rabiaa TV	Al Rabiaa TV
Japan	DAZN Group		DAZN
South Korea	TVING Corporation, Coupang		Coupang Play
Macau	MPLUS		MPLUS
Malaysia	Astro	TV1, TV2, Astro Arena, Astro Arena HD	Stadium Astro, MyKlik, Astro Go
Myanmar	Canal+	Canal+ Sports	Canal+ Plus
Qatar	BeIN Media Group	beIN Sports	beIN Sports
Saudi Arabia	Saudi Sports Company	SSC	Shaid MBC
Uzbekistan	Agency/Uzreport	Uzreport TV	Uzreport TV
Vietnam	VTV, FPT	VTV5, VTV6	VTVgo, FPT Play
