= Kein Satō =

Japanese footballer (born 2001)

Kein Satō 佐藤 恵允
Personal information
- Full name: Keiji Satō
- Date of birth: 11 July 2001 (age 25)
- Place of birth: Setagaya, Tokyo, Japan
- Height: 1.78 m (5 ft 10 in)
- Positions: Left winger; striker

Team information
- Current team: FC Tokyo
- Number: 10

Youth career
- 2006–2013: Setagaya United
- 2014–2016: Endo Football Academy
- 2017–2019: Jissen Gakuen High School

College career
| Years | Team | Apps | (Gls) |
| 2020–2023 | Meiji University | | |

Senior career*
| Years | Team | Apps | (Gls) |
| 2023–2025 | Werder Bremen II | 33 | (6) |
| 2025– | FC Tokyo | 27 | (4) |

International career^{‡}
| 2022 | Japan U21 | 4 | (2) |
| 2021– | Japan U23 | 26 | (9) |
Medal record
Men's football
Representing Japan
AFC U-23 Asian Cup
| Gold medal – first place | 2024 Qatar | Team |
| Bronze medal – third place | 2022 Uzbekistan | Team |
Asian Games
| Silver medal – second place | 2022 Hangzhou | Team |
- * Club domestic league appearances and goals as of 16 September 2025 ‡ National team caps and goals as of 29 April 2024

Keiji "Kein" Satō (Japanese: 佐藤 恵允; born 11 July 2001) is a Japanese professional footballer who plays as a left winger or striker for J1 League club, FC Tokyo.

== Club career ==
He started his football career at the age of 5, playing for local club Setagaya United. In 2014, he joined the Endo Football Academy, run by former Japan national team defender Masahiro Endo. In 2017, he attended the Jissen Gakuen High School in Tokyo, before entering the Meiji University. In August 2023, he dropped out of Meiji with a few months before completing his graduation, as he decided to sign for the reserves team of Werder Bremen.

On 28 January 2025, Satō joined the J1 club FC Tokyo for the 2025 season.

== International career ==
Satō is a youth international for Japan, having represented Japan U23 in the 2022 AFC U-23 Asian Cup and 2022 Asian Games where his team both finished as runners-up, and the 2024 AFC U-23 Asian Cup.

On 4 April 2024, Satō was called up to the Japan U23 squad for the 2024 AFC U-23 Asian Cup.

== Personal life ==
Satō was born in Tokyo, Japan, to a Colombian father and a Japanese mother.

== Career statistics ==
=== Club ===
As of 10 May 2025

Appearances and goals by club, season and competition
| Club | Season | League | | | National cup | | League cup | | Continental | | Other | | Total | |
| Club | Season | Division | Apps | Goals | Apps | Goals | Apps | Goals | Apps | Goals | Apps | Goals | Apps | Goals |
|---|---|---|---|---|---|---|---|---|---|---|---|---|---|---|
| Werder Bremen II | 2023–24 | Bremenliga | 14 | 5 | — | | | | | | 2 (Note: Appearances in promotion play-offs) | 0 | 16 | 5 |
| Werder Bremen II | 2024–25 | Regionalliga | 19 | 1 | — | | | | | | | | 19 | 1 |
| FC Tokyo | 2025 | J1 League | 15 | 3 | 0 | 0 | 2 | 0 | – | | 0 | 0 | 17 | 3 |
| Career total | | | 48 | 9 | 0 | 0 | 2 | 0 | 0 | 0 | 2 | 0 | 52 | 9 |

== Honours ==
Japan U23

- Asian Games Silver Medal: 2022
- AFC U-23 Asian Cup: 2024; runner-up: 2022

Individual

- J1 100 Year Vision League Regional Round East Best Eleven: 2026
