= Khamidullo Abdunabiev =

Uzbek footballer

Hamidullo Abdunabiyev

Personal information
- Date of birth: August 20, 2002 (age 24)
- Place of birth: Fergana, Uzbekistan
- Position: Goalkeeper

Team information
- Current team: OKMK
- Number: 23

Youth career
- –2021: Pakhtakor U-18

Senior career*
Years	Team	Apps	(Gls)
2021–2024	Olympic	38	(0)
2024–2025	Bunyodkor	16	(0)

International career
2021	Uzbekistan U-20	1	(0)
2022–2024	Uzbekistan U-23	8	(0)
- * Club domestic league appearances and goals

Khamidullo Abdunabiev (Uzbek: Hamidullo Abdunabiyev; born 20 August 2002) is an Uzbekistani footballer who plays as a goalkeeper. In 2023, he won a bronze medal at the Asian Games held in China as part of the Uzbekistan Olympic football team.

== Football career ==
=== Club career ===
Hamidullo received his initial football education at Pakhtakor academy. He played for the Pakhtakor U18 team until the end of the 2020 season. In the 2021 season, transferred to the newly established Olympic under the National Olympic Committee of Uzbekistan. After serving as the club's second-choice goalkeeper for the first two seasons, Khamidullo became the main goalkeeper for Olympic during the 2023 season.

=== International career ===
He has played for several youth national teams of Uzbekistan. He made his debut for the Uzbekistan Olympic football team on 25 September 2023.

== Honors ==
- (silver) AFC U-23 Asian Cup runner-up: 2022
