= Andri Syahputra =

Qatari footballer (born 1999)

Personal information
- Full name: Andri Syahputra Sudarmanto
- Date of birth: 29 June 1999 (age 27)
- Place of birth: Lhokseumawe, Indonesia
- Height: 1.68 m (5 ft 6 in)
- Position: Midfielder

Team information
- Current team: Al-Gharafa
- Number: 22

Youth career
- 2007–2009: Al Khor
- 2009–2017: Al-Gharafa

Senior career*
Years	Team	Apps	(Gls)
2017–	Al-Gharafa	39	(0)
2023–2024	→ Muaither (loan)	18	(1)
2025	→ Al-Khor (loan)	7	(0)

International career
2017–2018	Qatar U19	5	(1)
2019	Qatar U20	3	(0)
2021–2022	Qatar U23	11	(0)
- * Club domestic league appearances and goals as of 5 April 2025

Andri Syahputra Sudarmanto (born 29 June 1999) is a professional footballer who plays as a midfielder for Qatar Stars League club Al-Gharafa. Born in Indonesia, he represents Qatar at international level.

== Career ==
Born in Lhokseumawe, Indonesia, Andri was sent to the Aspire Academy in Qatar at an early age. He was then made a permanent resident in Qatar and was called up to the Qatar under-19s in 2017 and made his debut in the same year in a friendly match against England. On 23 May 2022, Andri was called up to the Qatar under-23s for the 2022 AFC U-23 Asian Cup.

== Honours ==
=== Club ===
Al Gharafa

- Qatari Stars Cup: 2019
