= Mohammad Aburiziq =

Jordanian footballer

Personal information
- Full name: Mohammad Abdel-Motalib Yousef Aburiziq
- Date of birth: 1 February 1999 (age 27)
- Place of birth: Jordan
- Height: 1.83 m (6 ft 0 in)
- Position: Striker

Team information
- Current team: Al-Salt

Youth career
- –2022: Al-Baqa'a

Senior career*
Years	Team	Apps	(Gls)
2022–2023	Al-Baqa'a		
2023–2025	Al-Wehdat		
2024–2025	→Al-Salt (loan)	19	(9)
2025–2026	Al-Minaa	11	(0)
2026	Al Ittihad Misurata	1	(0)
2026–	Al-Salt	0	(0)

International career^{‡}
2018	Jordan U19	3	(0)
2020–2022	Jordan U23	16	(3)
2024–	Jordan	1	(0)
- * Club domestic league appearances and goals as of 2 June 2026 ‡ National team caps and goals as of 26 March 2024

Mohammad Abdel-Motalib Yousef Aburiziq (Arabic: مُحَمَّد عَبْد الْمُطَّلِب يُوسُف أَبُو رِزْق; born 1 February 1999), popularly known as Pogba (Arabic: بوغبا), is a Jordanian professional footballer who plays as a striker for Jordanian Pro League club Al-Salt.

== Club career ==
=== Al-Baqa'a ===
He began his professional career with Al-Baqa'a.

Aburiziq was on his way to move to Al-Hussein during the 2022 Jordanian Pro League season, after he had terminated his contract, but Al-Baqa'a appealed the decision when he tore his ACL during the AFC U-23 Asian Cup so that the player would return to the club.

Aburiziq was the center of a contractual dispute during his season-long injury break, between his parent club Al Baqa'a, Al-Hussein, and Al-Wehdat, which lasted until the following season.

=== Al-Wehdat ===
Aburiziq signed a 4-year contract with Al-Wehdat in late April 2023.

On 21 May 2024, Al-Wehdat manager Ra'fat Ali suspended Aburiziq from team practices, as well as suspend his finances, as a result of failing to meet team practices and take the club's principles into account.

==== Al-Salt (on loan) ====
On 25 July 2024, Aburiziq signed a season-long loan deal with Al-Salt, as a result of Ra'fat Ali suspending him from Al-Wehdat practices.

He scored a brace on his league debut against Shabab Al-Ordon in a 2–1 victory.

=== Al-Minaa ===
On 18 August 2025, Aburiziq signed with Iraq Stars League club Al-Minaa.

== International career ==
Aburiziq was a youth international for Jordan, having represented the Jordanian under-23 team at the 2022 AFC U-23 Asian Cup. He tore his ACL during the tournament, which required him to have a surgery on 6 July 2022. The injury also prevented him from making his potential move to Al-Hussein.

On 10 March 2024, Aburiziq was called up to the Jordan national football team for their World Cup qualifying campaign against Pakistan, which he made his debut on March 26 in a 7–0 victory.

== Career statistics ==
=== Club ===
As of 7 November 2025

Club	Season	League			Cup (Note: Includes Jordan FA Cup)		League Cup (Note: Includes Jordan Shield Cup)		Continental (Note: Includes AFC Champions League and AFC Champions League Two)		Total	
Club	Season	Division	Apps	Goals	Apps	Goals	Apps	Goals	Apps	Goals	Apps	Goals
Al-Baqa'a	2022	Jordanian Pro League	12	4	4	0	3	1	0	0	19	5
Al-Wehdat	2023–24	Jordanian Pro League	18	7	6	2	4	1	6	1	32	11
Al-Salt (loan)	2024–25	Jordanian Pro League	19	9	2	2	3	1	0	0	24	12
Al-Wehdat	2025–26	Jordanian Pro League	13	8	4	2	3	0	3	0	23	10
Al-Minaa	2025–26	Iraq Stars League	6	0	2	2	—		—		8	2
Career total			68	28	18	8	13	3	9	1	108	40

== Honours ==
Al-Wehdat

- Jordan FA Cup: 2023–24
