= Ruslanbek Jiyanov =

Uzbekistani footballer (born 2001)

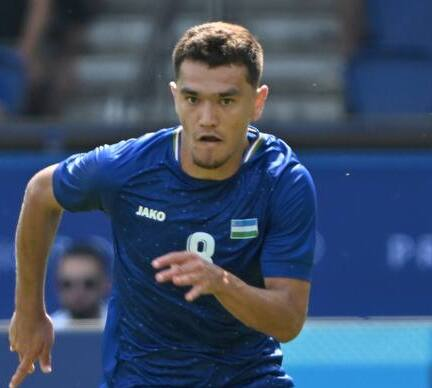
- Jiyanov with Uzbekistan U23 in 2024

Personal information
- Full name: Ruslanbek Muzaffar ugli Jiyanov
- Date of birth: 5 June 2001 (age 25)
- Place of birth: Tashkent, Uzbekistan
- Height: 1.70 m (5 ft 7 in)
- Position: Winger

Team information
- Current team: Navbahor
- Number: 7

Youth career
- –2020: Pakhtakor

Senior career*
Years	Team	Apps	(Gls)
2021–2022	Olympic Tashkent	38	(5)
2023–2026	Pari NN	0	(0)
2023	→ Olympic Tashkent (loan)	11	(2)
2024–2025	→ Navbahor (loan)	54	(9)
2026–	Navbahor	14	(4)

International career^{‡}
2022–2024	Uzbekistan U23	39	(3)
2022–	Uzbekistan	9	(1)
Medal record
Men's football
Representing Uzbekistan
CAFA Nations Cup
Winner	2025 Tajikistan–Uzbekistan	Team
AFC U-23 Asian Cup
Silver medal – second place	2022 Uzbekistan	Team
Silver medal – second place	2024 Qatar	Team
Asian Games
Bronze medal – third place	2022 Hangzhou	Team
- * Club domestic league appearances and goals as of 29 July 2026 ‡ National team caps and goals as of 23 June 2026

Ruslanbek Muzaffar ugli Jiyanov (Uzbek: Ruslanbek Muzaffar oʻgʻli Jiyanov; born 5 June 2001) is an Uzbek professional footballer who plays as a winger for Uzbek club Navbahor and the Uzbekistan national team.

== Club career ==
Jiyanov started his career with Olympic Tashkent.

On 10 February 2023, Jiyanov signed a three-and-a-half-year contract with Russian Premier League club Pari NN and was loaned back to Olympic until 30 June 2023. Upon his return from loan, he made no league appearances and one substitute Russian Cup appearance for Pari NN in the 2023–24 season. On 2 January 2024, Jiyanov moved on a new loan to Navbahor Namangan until 30 November 2024.

On 12 January 2026, Jiyanov returned to Navbahor on a permanent basis.

== International career ==
He made his debut for main team, Uzbekistan on 20 November 2022 in a friendly match against Russia.

On 17 June 2026, Jiyanov was called up to the Uzbekistan national team for the 2026 FIFA World Cup as a replacement for Jaloliddin Masharipov, who was ruled out due to a recurrence of an injury. Following a review of the Uzbek midfielder's medical records, FIFA's Medical Committee deemed him unfit to participate in the tournament and approved his replacement by Jiyanov in the final 26-man squad.

== Style of play ==
Jiyanov is known for his technical ability.

== Career statistics ==
=== Club ===
As of match played 8 August 2023

Appearances and goals by club, season and competition
Club	Season	League			Cup		Continental		Other		Total	
Club	Season	Division	Apps	Goals	Apps	Goals	Apps	Goals	Apps	Goals	Apps	Goals
Olympic Tashkent	2021	Uzbekistan Pro League	13	0	4	1	—		—		17	1
Olympic Tashkent	2022	Uzbekistan Super League	25	5	3	1	—		1 (Note: Appearance in Uzbekistan Super League Relegation Play off)	0	29	6
Olympic Tashkent	Total		38	5	7	1	—		1	0	46	7
Nizhny Novgorod	2023–24	Russian Premier League	0	0	1	0	—		—		1	0
Olympic Tashkent (loan)	2023	Uzbekistan Super League	11	2	3	1	—		—		14	3
Career total			49	7	11	3	0	0	1	0	61	10

=== International ===
Scores and results list Uzbekistan's goal tally first, score column indicates score after each Jiyanov goal.

List of international goals scored by Ruslanbek Jiyanov
No.	Date	Venue	Opponent	Score	Result	Competition
1	13 October 2025	Hang Jebat Stadium, Malacca City, Malaysia	Uruguay	1–2	1–2	Friendly
