= Otabek Jurakuziyev =

Uzbek footballer

Otabek Joʻraqoʻziyev
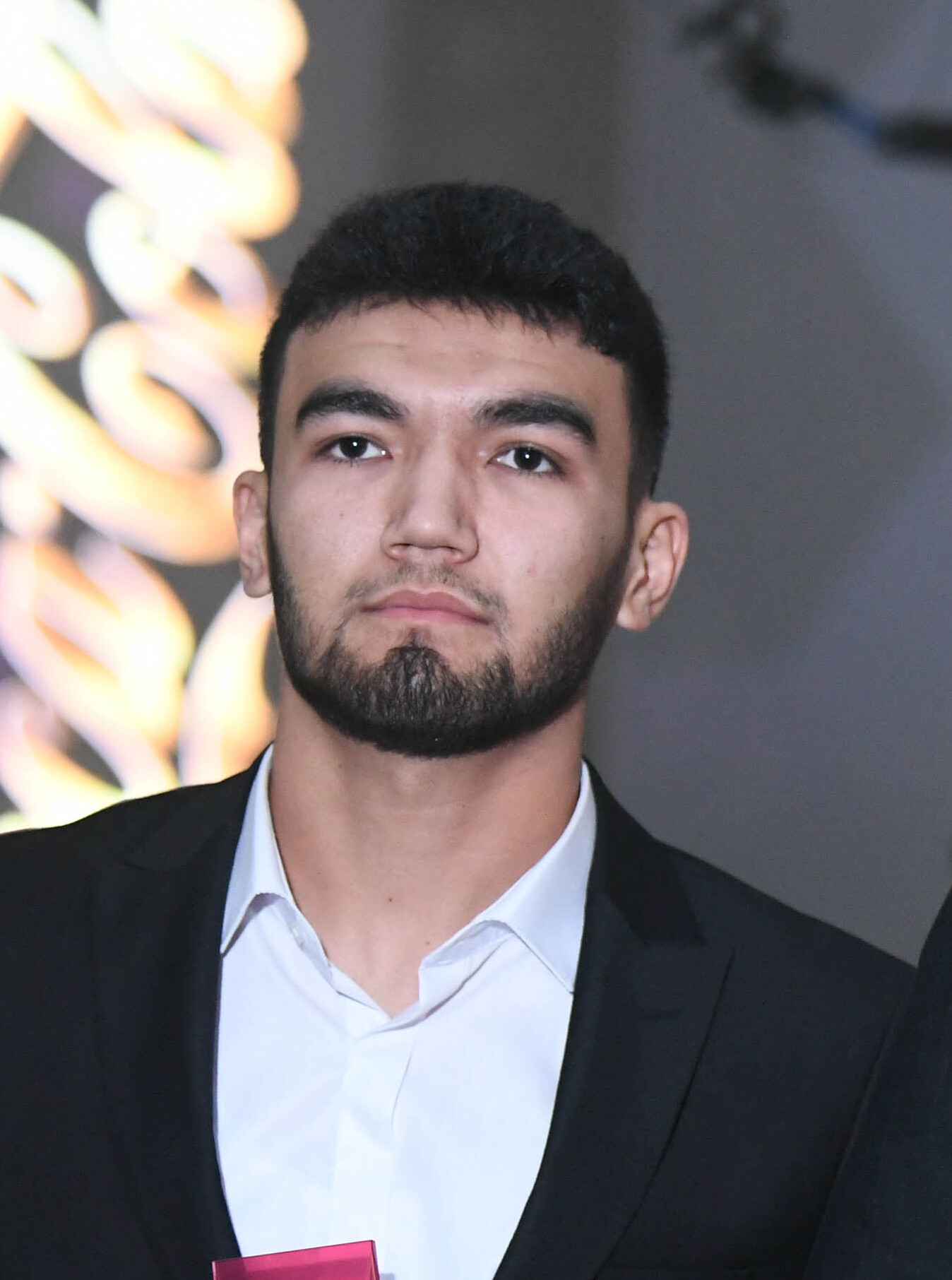

Personal information
- Full name: Otabek Joʻraqoʻziyev
- Date of birth: April 2, 2002 (age 24)
- Place of birth: Fergana, Uzbekistan
- Height: 1.85 m (6 ft 1 in)
- Positions: Forward; attacking midfielder

Team information
- Current team: Andijan

Youth career
- 2017-2020: Bunyodkor Academy

Senior career*
Years	Team	Apps	(Gls)
2019-2020	Bunyodkor-2	-	(-)
2021-2024	Olympic	80	(18)
2024-	Pakhtakor	20	(3)
2025-	→ Andijan (loan)	0	(0)

International career
2019	Uzbekistan U19	1	(0)
2021	Uzbekistan U21	2	(0)
2021-2023	Uzbekistan U23	26	(6)
2023	Uzbekistan Olympic team	4	(0)
- * Club domestic league appearances and goals

Otabek Jurakuziyev (Uzbek: Otabek Joʻraqoʻziyev; born 2 April 2002, Uzbekistan) is an Uzbek professional footballer who plays for FC Andijan. He plays as an attacking midfielder and forward.

== Playing career ==
Otabek began his football career at the Bunyodkor academy. He played for Bunyodkor-2, the reserve team of Bunyodkor, which competed in the Uzbekistan First League. In 2021, transferred to another Tashkent-based club, FC Olympic.

== Honors ==
- AFC U-23 Asian Cup runner-up: 2022
- Asian Games bronze medalist: 2022
