= Alireza Bavieh =

Iranian footballer

Personal information
- Full name: Alireza Bavieh
- Date of birth: August 21, 2002 (age 24)
- Place of birth: Ahvaz, Iran
- Height: 1.72 m (5 ft 8 in)
- Position: Attacking midfielder

Team information
- Current team: Oman Club
- Number: 18

Youth career
- –2021: Foolad

Senior career*
Years	Team	Apps	(Gls)
2021–2025	Foolad	11	(0)
2025–	Oman Club	0	(0)

International career
–2019	Iran U17		
- * Club domestic league appearances and goals as of 26 December 2021

Alireza Bavieh (Persian: علیرضا باویه; born August 21, 2002) is an Iranian football midfielder who currently plays for Oman Club in the Oman Professional League.

== Club career ==
=== Foolad ===
He made his debut for Foolad in 4th fixtures of 2021–22 Persian Gulf Pro League against Naft Masjed Soleyman while he substituted in for Ahmad Aljabouri.

== Career statistics ==
=== Club ===
Club	Season	League			Cup		Continental		Total	
Club	Season	League	Apps	Goals	Apps	Goals	Apps	Goals	Apps	Goals
Foolad	2021-22	Persian Gulf Pro League	1	0	0	0	0	0	1	0
Foolad	2022-23	Persian Gulf Pro League	3	0	1	0	0	0	4	0
Foolad	2023-24	Persian Gulf Pro League	7	0	0	0	0	0	7	0
Career Total			11	0	1	0	0	0	12	0
