= Erfan Shahriari =

Iranian footballer

Personal information
- Full name: Erfan Shahriari Khalaji
- Date of birth: 19 May 2002 (age 24)
- Place of birth: Karaj, Iran
- Height: 1.75 m (5 ft 9 in)
- Position: Attacking midfielder

Team information
- Current team: Malavan
- Number: 27

Youth career
- –2018: Esteghlal
- 2018–2019: Rah Ahan
- 2019–2020: Moghavemat
- 2020–2021: Paykan

Senior career*
| Years | Team | Apps | (Gls) |
| 2021–2022 | Paykan | 1 | (0) |
| 2022–2024 | Gol Gohar | 1 | (0) |
| 2024–2025 | Mes Rafsanjan | 21 | (0) |
| 2026– | Malavan | 10 | (4) |

International career^{‡}
| 2022 | Iran U23 | 3 | (1) |
- * Club domestic league appearances and goals as of 16 April 2025 ‡ National team caps and goals as of 4 June 2022

Erfan Shahriari Khalaji (Persian: عرفان شهریاری خلجی; born 19 May 2002) is an Iranian football midfielder who plays for Malavan in the Persian Gulf Pro League.

== Career statistics ==
=== Club ===
| Club | Season | League | | | Cup | | Continental | | Total | |
| Club | Season | League | Apps | Goals | Apps | Goals | Apps | Goals | Apps | Goals |
|---|---|---|---|---|---|---|---|---|---|---|
| Paykan | 2020-21 | Persian Gulf Pro League | 1 | 0 | 0 | 0 | - | - | 1 | 0 |
| Gol Gohar | 2023-24 | Persian Gulf Pro League | 1 | 0 | 0 | 0 | - | - | 1 | 0 |
| Mes Rafsanjan | 2023-24 | Persian Gulf Pro League | 10 | 0 | 4 | 0 | - | - | 14 | 0 |
| Career Total | | | 12 | 0 | 4 | 0 | 0 | 0 | 16 | 0 |

== Club career ==
=== Paykan ===
He made his debut for Paykan in 28th fixtures of 2020–21 Persian Gulf Pro League against Machine Sazi while he substituted in for Mohammad Amin Darvishi.
