= Wakaa Ramadan =

Iraqi footballer (born 1999)

Wakaa Rammdan
Personal information
- Full name: Wakaa Ramadan Jumaa
- Date of birth: 17 April 1999 (age 27)
- Place of birth: Karbala, Iraq
- Position: Striker

Team information
- Current team: Al-Karkh SC
- Number: 10

Youth career
- –2017: Karbala

Senior career*
Years	Team	Apps	(Gls)
2017–2018	Karbala		
2019–2021	Al-Naft		
2020–2021	→ Al-Talaba (loan)		
2021–2024	Al-Talaba		
2024-	Al-Karkh SC	9	(1)

International career^{‡}
2018–2020	Iraq U-20		
2019–2022	Iraq U-23		
2022–	Iraq		
- * Club domestic league appearances and goals as of 15 December 2024 @ 13:30(AEST) ‡ National team caps and goals as of 1 August 2024

Wakaa Ramadan Jumaa (Arabic: وَكَاع رَمَضَان جُمْعَة, born 17 April 1999), is an Iraqi professional football player who plays as a striker for Iraq Stars League club Al-Karkh.

== Club career ==
=== Early career ===
Wakaa made his senior debut with his boyhood club Karbala in 2017 but they would be relegated to the Iraqi First Division League in his first season with the club. Rammdan would move to Baghdad and sign for Al-Naft, gradually establishing himself as an emerging star in the Iraqi Premier League.

=== Al-Talaba ===
In 2020, Wakaa joined Al-Talaba on loan for one season. Having an instant impact, he became one of the club’s most important players and with Al-Talaba fighting a relegation battle in the last few games of the season, Wakaa attracted nationwide attention by scoring a hat-trick in 22 minutes in the first half of their match against Al-Minaa, helping his side to a 4-2 victory which would help secure their survival in the Iraqi Premier League. Following his breakout season on loan, Al-Talaba signed Rammdan on a permanent deal in September 2021 in a deal worth 50 million IQD on a two year contract. In October 2022, just one match into the Iraqi Premier League season, the young striker suffered an ACL and meniscus injury which ruled him out for the season and landing a blow to Al-Talaba’s hopes of competing for the title. In January 2024 Iraqi giants Al-Zawraa were heavily linked with Wakaa, making an offer to Al-Talaba and approaching the player to try and convince him to join. He ended up staying at his club until the end of the season. In April 2024, Rammdan and his teammate Ali Faez were suspended by the club for disciplinary reasons.

== International career ==
=== Iraq U-19 ===
Wakaa was called up to the Iraq U-19 national team in August 2018 to represent his country at the 2018 U-19 Asian Cup in Indonesia.

=== Iraq U-23 ===
In January 2019, aged just 19, Rammdan was called up to the Iraq U-23 national team for a training camp in Doha in preparation for the U-23 Asian Cup qualifiers in Tehran later that year. In August 2021 he was recalled into the U-23 national team for a friendly against Libya in Turkey, where he would score in a 3-2 defeat. He kept his place in the squad in September 2021 for two friendlies against the UAE U-23s before being included in the squad for the 2021 WAFF U-23 Championship in Saudi Arabia in October. He was called up again for the 2022 AFC U-23 Asian Cup qualifiers where he helped his country qualify. Wakaa would captain Iraq in the Asian Cup where he was named man of the match in Iraq’s opening game and would eventually reach the quarter finals, being knocked out by hosts Uzbekistan.

=== Iraq ===
In September 2022, Wakaa was called up to the Iraq national team for the first time for the 2022 Jordan International Tournament after his stellar performances for Al-Talaba in the Iraqi Premier League.

== Honours ==
Al-Quwa Al-Jawiya

- Iraq Stars League: 2025–26
