= Lee Sang-min (footballer, born 1999) =

South Korean footballer (born 1999)

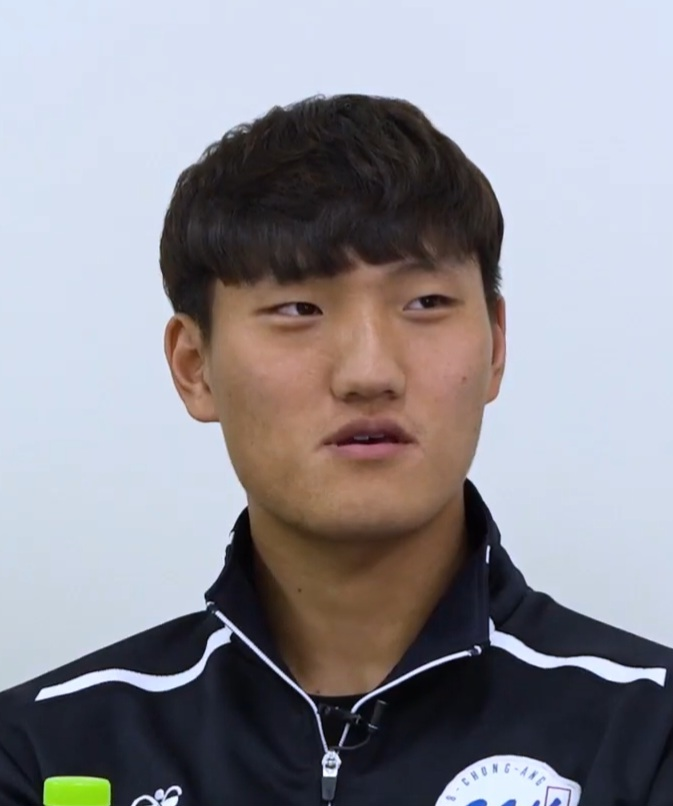

Personal information
- Date of birth: 30 August 1999 (age 27)
- Place of birth: Gimpo, Gyeonggi-do, South Korea
- Height: 1.82 m (6 ft 0 in)
- Position: Defender

Team information
- Current team: Seongnam FC
- Number: 20

Youth career
- 2015–2017: Ulsan Hyundai High School
- 2018–2019: Chung-Ang University

Senior career*
| Years | Team | Apps | (Gls) |
| 2020 | Ulsan Hyundai | 0 | (0) |
| 2020 | → Chungnam Asan (loan) | 4 | (1) |
| 2021-2022 | Chungnam Asan | 59 | (1) |
| 2023– | Seongnam FC | 59 | (1) |
| 2024–2025 | → Gimcheon Sangmu FC (army) | 2 | (0) |

International career^{‡}
| 2016 | South Korea U17 | 2 | (0) |
| 2019 | South Korea Universiade | 3 | (0) |
| 2021– | South Korea U23 | 6 | (1) |
- * Club domestic league appearances and goals as of 6 August 2026 ‡ National team caps and goals as of 19 June 2023

- Lee Sang-min
- Hangul: 이상민
- RR: I Sangmin
- MR: I Sangmin

Lee Sang-min (Korean: 이상민; born 30 August 1999) is a South Korean footballer who plays as a defender for Seongnam FC in the K League 1.

== Career statistics ==
As of 14 June 2023

Appearances and goals by club, season and competition
| Club | Season | League | | | Korean FA Cup | | Asia | | Play-offs | | Total | |
| Club | Season | Division | Apps | Goals | Apps | Goals | Apps | Goals | Apps | Goals | Apps | Goals |
|---|---|---|---|---|---|---|---|---|---|---|---|---|
| Chungnam Asan (loan) | 2020 | K League 2 | 4 | 1 | 1 | 0 | — | | — | | 5 | 1 |
| Chungnam Asan | 2021 | K League 2 | 23 | 0 | 3 | 0 | — | | — | | 26 | 0 |
| Chungnam Asan | 2022 | K League 2 | 36 | 1 | 0 | 0 | — | | — | | 36 | 1 |
| Seongnam FC | 2023 | K League 2 | 10 | 0 | 1 | 0 | — | | — | | 11 | 0 |
| Career total | | | 73 | 2 | 5 | 0 | 0 | 0 | 0 | 0 | 78 | 2 |
