= Mansoor Al-Menhali =

Emirati association football player (born 2003)

Personal information
- Full name: Mansoor Saeed Abdulla Al-Menhali
- Date of birth: 29 September 2003 (age 23)
- Place of birth: Emirates
- Height: 1.80 m (5 ft 11 in)
- Position: Forward

Youth career
- Al-Wahda

Senior career*
Years	Team	Apps	(Gls)
2020–2026	Al Wahda	16	(0)
2025–2026	→ Baniyas (loan)	3	(0)

International career
2022–	United Arab Emirates U23	3	(1)
- * Club domestic league appearances and goals as of 11:45, 30 December 2020 (UTC)

Mansoor Saeed Abdulla Al-Menhali (Arabic: منصور سعيد عبد الله المنهالي; born 29 September 2003) is an Emirati professional footballer who plays as a forward.

== Career statistics ==
=== Club ===
As of 30 December 2020.

Club	Season	League			Cup		Continental		Other		Total	
Club	Season	Division	Apps	Goals	Apps	Goals	Apps	Goals	Apps	Goals	Apps	Goals
Al-Wahda	2020–21	UAE Pro League	2	0	1	0	—		—		3	0
Career totals			2	0	1	0	0	0	0	0	3	0
