= Arya Yousefi =

Iranian footballer (born 2002)

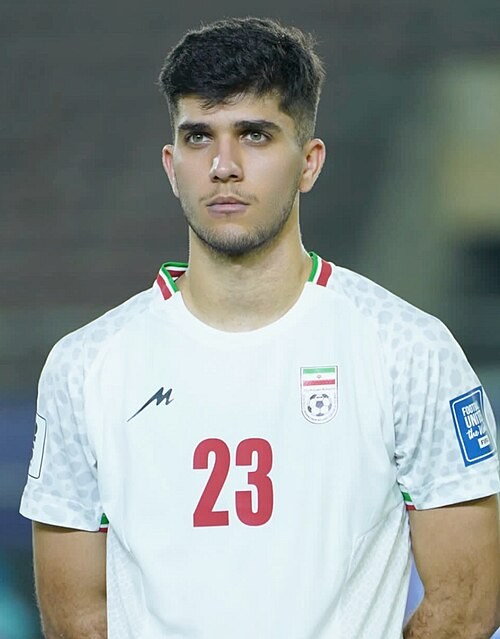
- Yousefi with Iran in 2025

Personal information
- Date of birth: 22 April 2002 (age 24)
- Place of birth: Bandar-e Mahshahr, Iran
- Height: 1.81 m (5 ft 11 in)
- Positions: Right-back; winger

Team information
- Current team: Sepahan
- Number: 14

Youth career
- Foolad
- Naft Ahvaz
- 2020–2021: Sepahan

Senior career*
| Years | Team | Apps | (Gls) |
| 2021– | Sepahan | 92 | (8) |

International career^{‡}
| 2022– | Iran U23 | 10 | (2) |
| 2024– | Iran | 19 | (1) |
Medal record
Representing Iran
CAFA Nations Cup
| Runner-up | 2025 Tajikistan–Uzbekistan | Team |
- * Club domestic league appearances and goals as of 23 February 2026 ‡ National team caps and goals as of 17 November 2026

Arya Yousefi (Note: Persian: آریا یوسفی) (born 22 April 2002) is an Iranian professional footballer who plays as a defender for Persian Gulf Pro League club Sepahan and the Iran national team.

== Career ==
Arya Yousefi was born in Bandar-e Mahshahr, and is a youth product of Naft Ahvaz and Sepahan. He debuted in the Persian Gulf Pro League with Sepahan in 2021.

== International career ==
Yousefi debuted with the Iran national team in a friendly 2–1 win over Burkina Faso on 5 January 2024. He was included in the final squad in the Iranian senior team to compete for the 2023 AFC Asian Cup in Qatar in January 2024.

On the 8th of September 2025, in a CAFA Nations Cup match against Uzbekistan, Yousefi obtained a red card and was sent off. It was the first red card of his international career.

On 1 June 2026, he was named in the 26-man squad for the 2026 FIFA World Cup.

== Career statistics ==
As of 23 February 2026

| Club | Division | Season | League | | Cup | | Asia | | Other | | Total | |
| Club | Division | Season | Apps | Goals | Apps | Goals | Apps | Goals | Apps | Goals | Apps | Goals |
|---|---|---|---|---|---|---|---|---|---|---|---|---|
| Sepahan | Pro League | 2021–22 | 4 | 0 | 1 | 0 | 0 | 0 | — | | 5 | 0 |
| Sepahan | Pro League | 2022–23 | 14 | 0 | 2 | 0 | — | | — | | 16 | 0 |
| Sepahan | Pro League | 2023–24 | 17 | 4 | 4 | 0 | 6 | 0 | — | | 27 | 4 |
| Sepahan | Pro League | 2024–25 | 28 | 1 | 3 | 0 | 6 | 1 | 1 | 0 | 38 | 2 |
| Sepahan | Pro League | 2025–26 | 20 | 1 | 2 | 0 | 7 | 1 | — | | 29 | 2 |
| Sepahan | Total | | 83 | 6 | 12 | 0 | 19 | 2 | 1 | 0 | 115 | 8 |
| Career totals | | | 83 | 6 | 12 | 0 | 19 | 2 | 1 | 0 | 115 | 8 |

=== International ===
As of match played 17 November 2026

Appearances and goals by national team and year
| National team | Year | Apps | Goals |
|---|---|---|---|
| Iran | 2024 | 5 | 0 |
| Iran | 2025 | 6 | 0 |
| Iran | 2026 | 8 | 1 |
| Total | | 19 | 1 |

Scores and results list Iran goal tally first, score column indicates score after each Yousefi goal

List of international goals scored by Aria Yousefi
| No. | Date | Venue | Opponent | Score | Result | Competition |
|---|---|---|---|---|---|---|
| 1 | 29 May 2026 | Mardan Sports Complex, Antalya, Turkey | Gambia | 1–1 | 3–1 | Friendly |

== Honours ==
Sepahan

- Iranian Hazfi Cup: 2023–24
- Iranian Super Cup: 2024

== In the media ==
One of the Iranian news agencies wrote about him with the headline "The Angel Who Saves Teams": "With exceptional positioning and creating goal opportunities with short passes, deep runs and quick comebacks, Arya Yousefi has managed to become the angel who saves teams in defense and attack.

He has also been referred to as a young phenomenon in some news and media.

An international media outlet published a news item with the headline "Rising Star Arya Yousefi Shines for Sepahan, Iran" to praise his performance and stated: "His impressive skills on the field have not gone unnoticed; he is emerging as a football phenomenon whose name is expected to gain worldwide recognition soon. With his contributions in both defense and attack, Arya Yousefi is poised to become one of the leading figures in Iranian football, captivating fans and analysts alike with his talent and determination."
