= Football at the 2022 Asian Games – Men's team squads =

List of football squads for XIX Asian Games

The following is a list of squads for each nation competing in men's football at the 2022 Asian Games in Hangzhou, China. Each nation must submit a squad of between 18 and 22 players, whom must be born on or after 1 January 1999, and three of whom can be older dispensation players are eligible to compete in the tournament.

== Group A ==
=== China ===
The following 22 players list is the China squad for the 2022 Asian Games.

Head Coach: (Serbia) Dejan Đurđević

No.	Pos.	Player	Date of birth (age)	Club
1	GK	Han Jiaqi	3 July 1999 (aged 24)	(Chinese Football Association) Beijing Guoan
2	DF	Liu Yang*	17 June 1995 (aged 28)	(Chinese Football Association) Shandong Taishan
3	DF	Jiang Shenglong	24 December 2000 (aged 22)	(Chinese Football Association) Shanghai Shenhua
4	DF	Yeljan Shinar	9 June 1999 (aged 24)	(Chinese Football Association) Nantong Zhiyun
5	DF	Zhu Chenjie	23 August 2000 (aged 23)	(Chinese Football Association) Shanghai Shenhua
6	MF	Ablahan Haliq	26 April 2001 (aged 22)	(Chinese Football Association) Shanghai Port
7	FW	Tao Qianglong	20 November 2001 (aged 21)	(Chinese Football Association) Wuhan Three Towns
8	MF	Dai Wai Tsun	25 July 1999 (aged 24)	(Chinese Football Association) Shanghai Shenhua
9	FW	Zhang Wei	16 May 2000 (aged 23)	(Chinese Football Association) Shanghai Shenhua
10	FW	Tan Long*	1 April 1988 (aged 35)	(Chinese Football Association) Changchun Yatai
11	MF	Xu Haoyang	15 January 1999 (aged 24)	(Chinese Football Association) Shanghai Shenhua
12	GK	Huang Zihao	9 June 2001 (aged 22)	(Chinese Football Association) Nanjing City
13	DF	He Yupeng	5 December 1999 (aged 23)	(Chinese Football Association) Dalian Pro
14	MF	Wang Haijian	2 August 2000 (aged 23)	(Chinese Football Association) Shanghai Shenhua
15	MF	Gao Tianyi*	1 July 1998 (aged 25)	(Chinese Football Association) Beijing Guoan
16	FW	Wang Zhenao	10 August 1999 (aged 24)	(Chinese Football Association) Dalian Pro
17	MF	Huang Jiahui	7 October 2000 (aged 22)	(Chinese Football Association) Dalian Pro
18	MF	Li Yongjia	24 July 2001 (aged 22)	(Chinese Football Association) Meizhou Hakka
19	DF	Sun Qinhan	21 March 2000 (aged 23)	(Chinese Football Association) Cangzhou Mighty Lions
20	FW	Fang Hao	3 January 2000 (aged 23)	(Chinese Football Association) Beijing Guoan
21	FW	Liu Ruofan	28 January 1999 (aged 24)	(Chinese Football Association) Shanghai Shenhua
22	GK	Peng Peng	24 November 2000 (aged 22)	(Chinese Football Association) Henan

* Over-aged player.

=== Bangladesh ===
The following 22 players list was the Bangladesh squad for the 2022 Asian Games. Originally named in the final squad, Jamal Bhuyan and Mohammad Ibrahim withdrew due to their club's refusal to release them. Md Taj Uddin, Mohamed Atikuzzaman, Sarower Zaman Nipu and Rajib Hossain withdrew due to injuries and were replaced by Papon Singh, Rahmat Mia, Sumon Reza and Mohammed Jahid Hasan.

Head Coach: (Spain) Javier Fernández Cabrera

No.	Pos.	Player	Date of birth (age)	Caps	Goals	Club
1	GK	Pappu Hossain	7 April 1999 (aged 24)	5	0	(Bangladesh Football Federation) Chittagong Abahani
2	MF	Mojibur Rahman Jony	1 January 2005 (aged 18)	0	0	(Bangladesh Football Federation) Bashundhara Kings
3	DF	Shahin Ahammad	15 October 2003 (aged 19)	3	0	(Bangladesh Football Federation) Sheikh Russel KC
4	DF	Hasan Murad Tipu*	2 January 1998 (aged 25)	0	0	(Bangladesh Football Federation) Mohammedan SC
5	MF	Mohammad Ridoy	1 January 2002 (aged 21)	3	0	(Bangladesh Football Federation) Abahani Limited Dhaka
6	MF	Papon Singh	31 December 1999 (aged 23)	2	0	(Bangladesh Football Federation) Abahani Limited Dhaka
7	MF	Abu Shaeid	6 August 1999 (aged 24)	2	0	(Bangladesh Football Federation) Sheikh Jamal Dhanmondi
8	MF	Rabiul Hasan	26 June 1999 (aged 24)	8	0	(Bangladesh Football Federation) Police Football Club
9	FW	Piash Ahmed Nova	25 September 2005 (aged 17)	3	0	(Bangladesh Football Federation) Sheikh Jamal Dhanmondi
10	FW	Sumon Reza*	15 June 1995 (aged 28)	0	0	(Bangladesh Football Federation) Sheikh Russel KC
11	FW	Foysal Ahmed Fahim	24 February 2002 (aged 21)	3	0	(Bangladesh Football Federation) Sheikh Jamal Dhanmondi
12	FW	Jafar Iqbal	27 September 1999 (aged 23)	5	0	(Bangladesh Football Federation) Mohammedan SC
13	GK	Mitul Marma	11 December 2003 (aged 19)	1	0	(Bangladesh Football Federation) Sheikh Russel KC
14	DF	Mohammed Jahid Hasan	1 June 2002 (aged 21)	0	0	(Bangladesh Football Federation) Bashundhara Kings
15	DF	Tanvir Hossain	13 December 2003 (aged 19)	0	0	(Bangladesh Football Federation) Rahmatganj MFS
16	MF	Shahidul Islam Sumon	6 July 2004 (aged 19)	0	0	(Bangladesh Football Federation) Sheikh Russel KC
17	DF	Isa Faysal	20 August 1999 (aged 24)	0	0	(Bangladesh Football Federation) Police Football Club
18	MF	Jayed Ahmed	14 December 2002 (aged 20)	2	0	(Bangladesh Football Federation) AFC Uttara
19	DF	Rahmat Mia (Captain)	8 December 1999 (aged 23)	25	0	(Bangladesh Football Federation) Abahani Limited Dhaka
20	FW	Md Rafiqul Islam	12 February 2004 (aged 19)	3	0	(Bangladesh Football Federation) Bashundhara Kings
21	DF	Shakil Hossain	6 July 2002 (aged 21)	2	0	(Bangladesh Football Federation) Sheikh Jamal Dhanmondi
22	GK	Mehedi Hasan Srabon	12 August 2005 (aged 18)	3	0	(Bangladesh Football Federation) Bashundhara Kings

* Over-aged player.

=== Myanmar ===
The following 22 players list was the Myanmar squad for the 2022 Asian Games.

Head Coach: (Germany) Michael Feichtenbeiner

No.	Pos.	Player	Date of birth (age)	Caps	Goals	Club
1	GK	Pyae Phyo Thu	21 October 2002 (aged 20)	15	0	(Myanmar Football Federation) Yadanarbon
2	DF	Nyan Lin Htet	January 20, 2002 (aged 21)	7	0	(Myanmar Football Federation) Yangon United
3	DF	Thet Hein Soe	September 29, 2001 (aged 21)	20	4	(Myanmar Football Federation) Yadanarbon
4	DF	Latt Wai Phone	May 4, 2005 (aged 18)	8	0	(Myanmar Football Federation) Ayeyawady United
5	DF	Kaung Htet Paing	May 27, 2004 (aged 19)	8	1	(Myanmar Football Federation) Yadanarbon
6	MF	Wai Lin Aung	July 30, 1999 (aged 24)	6	0	(Myanmar Football Federation) Dagon Stars United
7	MF	Zaw Win Thein	March 1, 2003 (aged 20)	18	0	(Myanmar Football Federation) Yangon United
8	MF	Arkar Kyaw	February 7, 2004 (aged 19)	7	0	(Myanmar Football Federation) Mahar United
9	FW	Oakkar Naing	November 18, 2003 (aged 19)	8	0	(Myanmar Football Federation) Yangon United
10	FW	Htet Phyo Wai	January 21, 2000 (aged 23)	13	5	(Myanmar Football Federation) Shan United
11	MF	Khun Kyaw Zin Hein	July 15, 2002 (aged 21)	7	1	(Myanmar Football Federation) Hanthawaddy
12	FW	Chit Aye	January 17, 2003 (aged 20)	4	0	(Myanmar Football Federation) Yadanarbon
13	MF	Min Myat Soe	October 5, 2000 (aged 22)	3	0	(Myanmar Football Federation) Dagon Stars United
14	DF	Zin Ko Htet	July 27, 2000 (aged 23)	2	0	(Myanmar Football Federation) Yangon United
15	DF	Zwe Khant Min	June 20, 2000 (aged 23)	10	0	(Myanmar Football Federation) Shan United
16	MF	Yan Naing Oo*	March 31, 1996 (aged 27)	15	2	(Myanmar Football Federation) Yangon United
17	MF	Nay Moe Naing*	December 13, 1997 (aged 25)	7	0	(Myanmar Football Federation) Hanthawaddy
18	GK	Pyae Phyo Aung	June 3, 1999 (aged 24)	0	0	(Myanmar Football Federation) Hanthawaddy
19	DF	Hein Zayar Linn	December 8, 2000 (aged 22)	16	0	(Myanmar Football Federation) Yangon United
20	DF	Min Khant	August 5, 2002 (aged 21)	1	0	(Myanmar Football Federation) Rakhine United
21	FW	Yan Kyaw Htwe*	October 2, 1995 (aged 27)	0	0	(Myanmar Football Federation) Yangon United
23	GK	Zin Nyi Nyi Aung	June 6, 2000 (aged 23)	0	0	(Myanmar Football Federation) Dagon Stars United

^{*} Over-aged player.

=== India ===
The following 21 players list was the India squad for the 2022 Asian Games. Originally named in the final squad, Gurpreet Singh Sandhu, Akash Mishra, Anwar Ali, Asish Rai, Naorem Roshan Singh, Lalengmawia Ralte, Jeakson Singh, Naorem Mahesh Singh, Suresh Singh Wangjam, Sivasakthi Narayanan, Vikram Partap Singh withdrew due to their club's refusal to release them. On 18 September, Deepak Tangri withdrew from the squad and was replaced by Jeakson Singh, but he too was not released by club.

Head Coach: (Croatia) Igor Štimac

No.	Pos.	Player	Date of birth (age)	Caps	Goals	Club
1	GK	Gurmeet Singh	3 December 1999 (aged 23)	0	0	(All India Football Federation) Hyderabad
2	FW	Gurkirat Singh	16 July 2003 (aged 20)	0	0	(All India Football Federation) Mumbai City
3	DF	Lalchungnunga	25 December 2000 (aged 22)	0	0	(All India Football Federation) East Bengal
4	DF	Chinglensana Singh*	27 November 1996 (aged 26)	0	0	(All India Football Federation) Hyderabad
5	DF	Sandesh Jhingan*	21 July 1993 (aged 30)	6	0	(All India Football Federation) Goa
6	MF	Ayush Dev Chhetri	16 April 2003 (aged 20)	0	0	(All India Football Federation) Goa
7	DF	Sumit Rathi	26 August 2001 (aged 22)	2	0	(All India Football Federation) Mohun Bagan
8	MF	Amarjit Singh Kiyam	6 January 2001 (aged 22)	3	0	(All India Football Federation) Punjab
9	FW	Rahim Ali	21 April 2000 (aged 23)	6	1	(All India Football Federation) Chennaiyin
10	FW	Rahul KP	16 March 2000 (aged 23)	5	0	(All India Football Federation) Kerala Blasters
11	FW	Sunil Chhetri*	3 August 1984 (aged 39)	2	0	(All India Football Federation) Bengaluru
12	MF	Samuel James	11 March 2000 (aged 23)	0	0	(All India Football Federation) Punjab
13	GK	Vishal Yadav	5 May 2002 (aged 21)	0	0	(All India Football Federation) Jamshedpur
14	FW	Aniket Jadhav	13 July 2000 (aged 23)	2	0	(All India Football Federation) Odisha
16	MF	Vincy Barretto	8 December 1999 (aged 23)	0	0	(All India Football Federation) Chennaiyin
17	MF	Bryce Miranda	23 September 1999 (aged 23)	1	0	(All India Football Federation) Kerala Blasters
18	DF	Narender Gahlot	24 April 2001 (aged 22)	4	0	(All India Football Federation) Odisha
19	MF	Abdul Rabeeh	23 January 2001 (aged 22)	0	0	(All India Football Federation) Hyderabad
20	FW	Rohit Danu	10 July 2002 (aged 21)	2	0	(All India Football Federation) Bengaluru
21	GK	Dheeraj Singh	4 July 2000 (aged 23)	6	0	(All India Football Federation) Goa
22	MF	Azfar Noorani	17 October 2000 (aged 22)	0	0	(All India Football Federation) Kenkre

^{*} Over-aged player.

== Group B ==
=== Vietnam ===
The following 22 players list is the Vietnam squad for the 2022 Asian Games. Originally named in the final squad, Bùi Tiến Dụng withdrew due to passport problems.

Head Coach: (Vietnam) Hoàng Anh Tuấn

No.	Pos.	Player	Date of birth (age)	Caps	Goals	Club
1	GK	Đỗ Sỹ Huy* (captain)	16 April 1998 (aged 25)	0	0	(Vietnam Football Federation) Công An Hà Nội
2	DF	Phan Tuấn Tài	7 January 2001 (aged 22)	30	1	(Vietnam Football Federation) Viettel
3	DF	Võ Minh Trọng	24 October 2001 (aged 21)	11	0	(Vietnam Football Federation) Đồng Tháp
4	DF	Nguyễn Mạnh Hưng	8 August 2005 (aged 18)	2	0	(Vietnam Football Federation) Viettel
5	DF	Lê Nguyên Hoàng	14 February 2005 (aged 18)	4	0	(Vietnam Football Federation) Sông Lam Nghệ An
6	MF	Trần Nam Hải	5 February 2004 (aged 19)	5	0	(Vietnam Football Federation) Sông Lam Nghệ An
7	MF	Nguyễn Đức Việt	1 January 2004 (aged 19)	14	0	(Vietnam Football Federation) Hoàng Anh Gia Lai
8	MF	Nguyễn Đức Phú	13 January 2003 (aged 20)	7	0	(Vietnam Football Federation) PVF-CAND
9	FW	Nguyễn Quốc Việt	4 May 2003 (aged 20)	16	3	(Vietnam Football Federation) Hoàng Anh Gia Lai
10	FW	Nhâm Mạnh Dũng	12 April 2000 (aged 23)	21	2	(Vietnam Football Federation) Viettel
11	MF	Đinh Xuân Tiến	10 January 2003 (aged 20)	11	4	(Vietnam Football Federation) Sông Lam Nghệ An
12	MF	Nguyễn Đình Bắc	19 August 2004 (aged 19)	3	1	(Vietnam Football Federation) Quảng Nam
13	GK	Cao Văn Bình	8 January 2005 (aged 18)	1	0	(Vietnam Football Federation) Sông Lam Nghệ An
14	MF	Khuất Văn Khang	11 May 2003 (aged 20)	20	1	(Vietnam Football Federation) Viettel
15	FW	Nguyễn Thanh Nhàn	28 July 2003 (aged 20)	10	1	(Vietnam Football Federation) PVF-CAND
16	DF	Nguyễn Hồng Phúc	31 May 2003 (aged 20)	5	1	(Vietnam Football Federation) Viettel
17	MF	Nguyễn Phi Hoàng	27 March 2003 (aged 20)	3	0	(Vietnam Football Federation) SHB Đà Nẵng
18	MF	Nguyễn Thái Sơn	13 July 2003 (aged 20)	9	1	(Vietnam Football Federation) Thanh Hóa
19	FW	Võ Nguyên Hoàng	7 February 2002 (aged 21)	4	0	(Vietnam Football Federation) PVF-CAND
20	FW	Bùi Vĩ Hào	24 February 2003 (aged 20)	7	3	(Vietnam Football Federation) Becamex Bình Dương
21	DF	Nguyễn Đức Anh	16 May 2003 (aged 20)	1	0	(Vietnam Football Federation) Hà Nội
22	GK	Quan Văn Chuẩn	7 January 2001 (aged 22)	23	0	(Vietnam Football Federation) Hà Nội

* Over-aged player.

=== Saudi Arabia ===
The following 22 players list is the Saudi Arabia squad for the 2022 Asian Games.

Head Coach: (Saudi Arabia) Saad Al-Shehri

No.	Pos.	Player	Date of birth (age)	Club
1	GK	Abdulrahman Al-Sanbi	3 February 2001 (aged 22)	(Saudi Arabian Football Federation) Al-Ahli
2	MF	Mohammed Aboulshamat	11 August 2002 (aged 21)	(Saudi Arabian Football Federation) Al-Qadsiah
3	DF	Saad Al Mousa	10 December 2002 (aged 20)	(Saudi Arabian Football Federation) Al-Ettifaq
4	DF	Rayane Hamidou	13 April 2002 (aged 21)	(Saudi Arabian Football Federation) Al-Ahli
5	DF	Mohammed Eisa	2 April 2002 (aged 21)	(Saudi Arabian Football Federation) Al-Shabab
6	MF	Naif Masoud	8 March 2001 (aged 22)	(Saudi Arabian Football Federation) Al-Qadsiah
7	MF	Saleh Aboulshamat	11 August 2002 (aged 21)	(Saudi Arabian Football Federation) Al-Qadsiah
8	MF	Faisal Al-Ghamdi	13 August 2001 (aged 22)	(Saudi Arabian Football Federation) Al-Ittihad
9	FW	Abdullah Radif	20 January 2003 (aged 20)	(Saudi Arabian Football Federation) Al-Shabab
10	MF	Saad Al-Nasser	8 January 2001 (aged 22)	(Saudi Arabian Football Federation) Al-Taawoun
11	MF	Ahmed Al-Ghamdi	20 September 2001 (aged 21)	(Saudi Arabian Football Federation) Al-Ettifaq
12	DF	Zakaria Hawsawi	12 January 2001 (aged 22)	(Saudi Arabian Football Federation) Al-Ittihad
13	DF	Hussain Al-Sibyani	24 June 2001 (aged 22)	(Saudi Arabian Football Federation) Al-Shabab
14	MF	Awad Al-Nashri	15 March 2002 (aged 21)	(Saudi Arabian Football Federation) Al-Ittihad
15	MF	Abdulmalik Al-Oyayari	10 November 2003 (aged 19)	(Saudi Arabian Football Federation) Al-Taawoun
16	FW	Mohammed Maran	15 February 2001 (aged 22)	(Saudi Arabian Football Federation) Al-Nassr
17	FW	Haitham Asiri	25 March 2001 (aged 22)	(Saudi Arabian Football Federation) Al-Ahli
18	MF	Musab Al-Juwayr	20 June 2003 (aged 20)	(Saudi Arabian Football Federation) Al-Hilal
19	DF	Meshal Al-Sebyani	11 April 2001 (aged 22)	(Saudi Arabian Football Federation) Al-Faisaly
20	DF	Nawaf Al-Mutairi	7 March 2001 (aged 22)	(Saudi Arabian Football Federation) Al-Orobah
21	GK	Ahmed Al Jubaya	26 October 2001 (aged 21)	(Saudi Arabian Football Federation) Al-Qadsiah
22	GK	Mohammed Al-Absi	24 September 2002 (aged 20)	(Saudi Arabian Football Federation) Al-Shabab

=== Iran ===
The following 21 players list is the Iran squad for the 2022 Asian Games. Mohammad Reza Bordbar and Alireza Rezaei did not find the right to leave the country due to the problems of the Conscription military service at Iran. The two players did not receive permission to leave the country and consequently withdrew from the squad and was not replaced.

Head Coach: (Iran) Reza Enayati

No.	Pos.	Player	Date of birth (age)	Club
1	GK	Hossein Hosseini* (captain)	30 June 1992 (aged 31)	(Football Federation Islamic Republic of Iran) Esteghlal
2	DF	Saman Touranian	12 December 2001 (aged 21)	(Football Federation Islamic Republic of Iran) Esteghlal
3	DF	Hossein Goudarzi	4 May 2001 (aged 22)	(Football Federation Islamic Republic of Iran) Shams Azar
4	DF	Saman Fallah	12 May 2001 (aged 22)	(Football Federation Islamic Republic of Iran) Gol Gohar
5	DF	Sina Shahabbasi	11 August 1999 (aged 24)	(Football Federation Islamic Republic of Iran) Foolad
6	MF	Omid Hamedifar	19 August 2000 (aged 23)	(Football Federation Islamic Republic of Iran) Esteghlal
7	MF	Mohammad Hossein Eslami	13 April 2001 (aged 22)	(Football Federation Islamic Republic of Iran) Zob Ahan
8	MF	Mohammad Khodabandelou	7 September 1999 (aged 24)	(Football Federation Islamic Republic of Iran) Gol Gohar
9	FW	Amir Arsalan Motahari*	10 March 1993 (aged 30)	(Football Federation Islamic Republic of Iran) Esteghlal
10	MF	Yasin Salmani	27 February 2002 (aged 21)	(Football Federation Islamic Republic of Iran) Persepolis
11	FW	Aria Barzegar	10 October 2002 (aged 20)	(Football Federation Islamic Republic of Iran) Nassaji
12	GK	Alireza Rezaei	11 December 1999 (aged 23)	(Football Federation Islamic Republic of Iran) Esteghlal
13	MF	Fardin Yousefi	13 October 2000 (aged 22)	(Football Federation Islamic Republic of Iran) Zob Ahan
14	DF	Amir Jafari	18 January 2002 (aged 21)	(Football Federation Islamic Republic of Iran) Gol Gohar
15	MF	Mohammad Reza Ghobeishavi	24 January 2000 (aged 23)	(Football Federation Islamic Republic of Iran) Foolad
16	DF	Majid Nasiri	14 May 2000 (aged 23)	(Football Federation Islamic Republic of Iran) Mes Rafsanjan
17	MF	Mehdi Mamizadeh	15 April 2000 (aged 23)	(Football Federation Islamic Republic of Iran) Gol Gohar
18	MF	Alireza Koushki	15 February 2000 (aged 23)	(Football Federation Islamic Republic of Iran) Gol Gohar
19	MF	Mohammad Omri	11 March 2000 (aged 23)	(Football Federation Islamic Republic of Iran) Persepolis
20	MF	Gholamreza Sabet Imani	6 April 2000 (aged 23)	(Football Federation Islamic Republic of Iran) Paykan
22	GK	Sina Saeidifar	12 April 2001 (aged 22)	(Football Federation Islamic Republic of Iran) Shams Azar

* Over-aged player

=== Mongolia ===
The following 23 players list is the Mongolia squad for the 2022 Asian Games.

Head Coach: (Japan) Ichiro Otsuka

No.	Pos.	Player	Date of birth (age)	Club
1	GK	Sereekhua Batmagni	24 July 2002 (aged 21)	(Mongolian Football Federation) Deren
2	DF	Khashchuluun Naranbaatar	5 August 2004 (aged 19)	(Mongolian Football Federation) Deren
3	DF	Bayartsengel Purevdorj*	26 January 1997 (aged 26)	(Mongolian Football Federation) Khangarid
4	DF	Ganbat Dulguun	27 October 2004 (aged 18)	(Mongolian Football Federation) Deren
5	MF	Gan-Erdene Erdenebat	24 August 2005 (aged 18)	(Mongolian Football Federation) Deren
6	MF	Tserenbat Baasanjav	31 December 1999 (aged 23)	(Mongolian Football Federation) Deren
7	DF	Dölgöön Amaraa	20 February 2001 (aged 22)	(Mongolian Football Federation) Deren
8	MF	Baljinnyam Batmönkh	10 December 1999 (aged 23)	(Mongolian Football Federation) Deren
9	FW	Temulen Uuganbat	7 May 2005 (aged 18)	(Mongolian Football Federation) Bayanzürkh Sporting Ilch
10	MF	Tsend-Ayuush Khürelbaatar* (captain)	22 February 1990 (aged 33)	(Mongolian Football Federation) Tuv Buganuud
11	FW	Ankhbayar Sodmunkh	7 August 2004 (aged 19)	(Mongolian Football Federation) Bayanzürkh Sporting Ilch
12	DF	Mönkh-Orgil Orkhon	30 January 1999 (aged 24)	(Mongolian Football Federation) Deren
13	DF	Oyuntuya Oyunbold	11 November 2001 (aged 21)	(Football Association of Hong Kong, China) Sham Shui Po
14	FW	Zayat Temuulen	10 December 2003 (aged 19)	(Mongolian Football Federation) Khangarid
15	MF	Togoo Munkhbaatar	20 November 1999 (aged 23)	(Mongolian Football Federation) Khoromkhon
16	MF	Ganbat Buyannemekh	13 June 2003 (aged 20)	(Mongolian Football Federation) Kharaatsai
17	MF	Tsogtbayar Batbayar	8 July 2001 (aged 22)	(Austrian Football Association) Rebenland Leutschach
18	DF	Tumen-Ulzii Sodbilguun	18 July 2005 (aged 18)	(Mongolian Football Federation) BCH Lions
19	FW	Nergui Sainbuyan	19 September 2002 (aged 21)	(Mongolian Football Federation) Kharaatsai
20	DF	Gochoo Bilguun	14 October 2000 (aged 22)	(Mongolian Football Federation) Khaan Khuns-Erchim
21	GK	Ariunbold Batsaikhan*	3 April 1990 (aged 33)	(Mongolian Football Federation) Khangarid
22	GK	Enkh-Erdene Gan-Erdene	12 August 2003 (aged 20)	(Mongolian Football Federation) Khoromkhon
23	DF	Enkhbold Erkhembayar	17 August 2002 (aged 21)	(Mongolian Football Federation) Deren

^{*} Over-aged player.

== Group C ==
=== Uzbekistan ===
The following 22 players list is the Uzbekistan squad for the 2022 Asian Games. Originally named in the final squad, Odil Abdumajidov, Saidafzalkhon Akhrorov, Abbosbek Fayzullaev, Abduvohid Nematov and Mukhammadaziz Ibrakhimov withdrew due to their club's refusal to release them.

Head Coach: (Uzbekistan) Timur Kapadze

No.	Pos.	Player	Date of birth (age)	Caps	Goals	Club
1	GK	Otabek Boymurodov	5 June 2003 (aged 20)	0	0	(Uzbekistan Football Association) Pakhtakor
2	DF	Saidazamat Mirsaidov	19 July 2001 (aged 22)	12	0	(Uzbekistan Football Association) Olympic Tashkent
3	DF	Makhmud Makhamadzhonov	30 June 2003 (aged 20)	4	1	(Uzbekistan Football Association) Bunyodkor
4	DF	Shokhzhakhon Sultonmurodov	19 March 2001 (aged 22)	0	0	(Uzbekistan Football Association) Surkhon Termez
5	DF	Mukhammadkodir Khamraliev	6 July 2001 (aged 22)	19	1	(Uzbekistan Football Association) Pakhtakor
6	DF	Bekhzod Shamsiev	4 June 2001 (aged 22)	0	0	(Uzbekistan Football Association) Surkhon Termez
7	FW	Khojimat Erkinov	29 May 2001 (aged 22)	11	1	(Russian Football Union) Torpedo Moscow
8	MF	Ibrokhim Ibrokhimov	12 January 2001 (aged 22)	10	0	(Uzbekistan Football Association) Metallurg
9	MF	Ulugbek Khoshimov	3 January 2001 (aged 22)	17	8	(Uzbekistan Football Association) Neftchi
10	MF	Jasurbek Jaloliddinov	15 May 2002 (aged 21)	27	8	(Uzbekistan Football Association) Olympic
11	FW	Otabek Jurakuziev	2 April 2002 (aged 21)	16	6	(Uzbekistan Football Association) Olympic
12	GK	Vladimir Nazarov	8 June 2002 (aged 21)	13	0	(Uzbekistan Football Association) Neftchi
13	DF	Eldorbek Begimov	29 January 2001 (aged 22)	13	1	(Uzbekistan Football Association) AGMK
14	MF	Ibrokhimkhalil Yuldoshev	14 February 2001 (aged 22)	3	0	(Russian Football Union) Nizhny Novgorod
15	MF	Sherzod Esanov	1 February 2003 (aged 20)	0	0	(Uzbekistan Football Association) Olympic
16	DF	Asadbek Rakhimzhonov	17 February 2004 (aged 19)	0	0	(Uzbekistan Football Association) Olympic
17	MF	Abdurauf Buriev	20 July 2002 (aged 21)	17	0	(Uzbekistan Football Association) Olympic
18	DF	Alibek Davronov	28 December 2002 (aged 20)	11	1	(Uzbekistan Football Association) Nasaf
19	FW	Khusayin Norchaev	6 February 2002 (aged 21)	14	8	(Russian Football Union) Alania Vladikavkaz
20	FW	Ruslanbek Jiyanov	5 June 2001 (aged 22)	19	2	(Russian Football Union) Nizhny Novgorod
21	GK	Khamidullo Abdunabiev	20 August 2002 (aged 21)	4	0	(Uzbekistan Football Association) Olympic
22	FW	Alisher Odilov	15 July 2001 (aged 22)	17	5	(Uzbekistan Football Association) Olympic

=== Hong Kong ===
The following 22 players list is the Hong Kong squad for the 2022 Asian Games. Originally named in the final squad, Vas Nuñez and Shinichi Chan were later replaced by Wu Chun Ming and Jordan Lam.

Head Coach: (Norway) Jorn Andersen

No.	Pos.	Player	Date of birth (age)	Caps	Goals	Club
1	GK	Ng Wai Him	30 June 2002 (aged 21)	2	0	(Football Association of Hong Kong, China) Southern
2	DF	Chan Hoi Pak	29 January 1999 (aged 24)	1	0	(Football Association of Hong Kong, China) Southern
3	DF	Alexander Jojo	11 February 1999 (aged 24)	2	0	(Football Association of Hong Kong, China) Tai Po
4	DF	Li Ngai Hoi*	15 October 1994 (aged 28)	4	0	(Football Association of Hong Kong, China) Rangers
5	DF	Yip Cheuk Man	12 October 2001 (aged 21)	3	0	(Football Association of Hong Kong, China) North District
6	MF	Wu Chun Ming*	21 November 1997 (aged 25)	5	1	(Football Association of Hong Kong, China) Lee Man
7	MF	Jordan Lam	2 January 1999 (aged 24)	4	2	(Football Association of Hong Kong, China) North District
8	MF	Wong Ho Chun	2 April 2002 (aged 21)	1	0	(Football Association of Hong Kong, China) Eastern
9	FW	Matt Orr*	1 January 1997 (aged 26)	8	1	(Chinese Football Association) Guangxi Pingguo Haliao
10	FW	Sun Ming Him	19 June 2000 (aged 23)	2	0	(Football Association of Hong Kong, China) Eastern
11	FW	Poon Pui Hin	3 October 2000 (aged 22)	1	0	(Football Association of Hong Kong, China) Kitchee
12	DF	Timothy Chow	11 March 2006 (aged 17)	2	0	(Football Association of Hong Kong, China) HKFC
13	FW	Jahangir Khan	3 October 2000 (aged 22)	0	0	(Football Association of Hong Kong, China) HKFC
14	MF	Yu Joy Yin	8 October 2001 (aged 21)	4	0	(Football Association of Hong Kong, China) Eastern
15	FW	Lau Ka Kiu	10 February 2002 (aged 21)	3	1	(Football Association of Hong Kong, China) HK U23
16	MF	Lam Hin Ting	9 December 1999 (aged 23)	6	0	(Football Association of Hong Kong, China) Rangers
17	FW	Chang Hei Yin	6 April 2000 (aged 23)	1	0	(Football Association of Hong Kong, China) Lee Man
18	GK	Pong Cheuk Hei	31 January 2004 (aged 19)	1	0	(Football Association of Hong Kong, China) Resources Capital
19	GK	Tse Ka Wing	4 September 1999 (aged 24)	2	0	(Football Association of Hong Kong, China) Tai Po
20	MF	Sohgo Ichikawa	30 July 2004 (aged 19)	4	1	(Football Association of Hong Kong, China) Southern
21	MF	Cheng Chun Wang	11 February 2001 (aged 22)	2	0	(Football Association of Hong Kong, China) HK U23
22	DF	Tsang Yi Hang	27 October 2003 (aged 19)	1	0	(Football Association of Hong Kong, China) HK U23

* Over-aged player.

== Group D ==
=== Japan ===
The following 22 players list is the Japan squad for the 2022 Asian Games.

Kotaro Uchino replaced the injured Naoki Kumata on 15 September 2023. Shun Ayukawa replaced another injured player, Yudai Kimura, on 20 September 2023.

Head coach: (Japan) Go Oiwa

No.	Pos.	Player	Date of birth (age)	Club
1	GK	Kazuki Fujita	19 February 2001 (aged 22)	(Japan Football Association) Tochigi SC
2	DF	Hayato Okuda	21 April 2001 (aged 22)	(Japan Football Association) Momoyama Gakuin University
3	DF	Manato Yoshida	16 November 2001 (aged 21)	(Japan Football Association) NIFS Kanoya
4	DF	Taichi Yamasaki	8 January 2001 (aged 22)	(Japan Football Association) Sanfrecce Hiroshima
5	DF	Seiya Baba	24 October 2001 (aged 21)	(Japan Football Association) Hokkaido Consadole Sapporo
6	MF	Daiki Matsuoka	1 June 2001 (aged 22)	(Brazilian Football Confederation) Novorizontino
7	DF	Ibuki Konno	10 May 2001 (aged 22)	(Japan Football Association) Hosei University
8	MF	Masato Shigemi	20 September 2001 (aged 21)	(Japan Football Association) Fukuoka University
9	FW	Shun Ayukawa	15 September 2001 (aged 22)	(Japan Football Association) Oita Trinita
10	MF	Jun Nishikawa	21 February 2002 (aged 21)	(Japan Football Association) Sagan Tosu
11	MF	Yuta Matsumura	13 April 2001 (aged 22)	(Japan Football Association) Kashima Antlers
12	GK	Yuma Obata	7 November 2001 (aged 21)	(Japan Football Association) Vegalta Sendai
13	MF	Kein Sato	11 July 2001 (aged 22)	(German Football Association) Werder Bremen II
14	MF	Yota Komi	11 August 2002 (aged 21)	(Japan Football Association) Albirex Niigata
15	MF	Teppei Yachida	1 November 2001 (aged 21)	(Japan Football Association) Kyoto Sanga
16	MF	Kakeru Yamauchi	6 January 2002 (aged 21)	(Japan Football Association) University of Tsukuba
17	MF	Shota Hino	16 October 2002 (aged 20)	(Japan Football Association) Takushoku University
18	GK	Taiki Yamada	8 January 2002 (aged 21)	(Japan Football Association) Fagiano Okayama
19	FW	Kotaro Uchino	19 June 2004 (aged 19)	(Japan Football Association) University of Tsukuba
20	MF	Koshiro Sumi	13 August 2002 (aged 21)	(Japan Football Association) University of Tsukuba
21	DF	Kenta Nemoto	13 December 2002 (aged 20)	(Japan Football Association) Ryutsu Keizai University
22	DF	Hiroki Sekine	11 August 2002 (aged 21)	(Japan Football Association) Takushoku University

=== Palestine ===
The following 19 players list is the Palestine squad for the 2022 Asian Games. Originally named in the final squad, Rami Hamada, Omar Kayed, Adham Khwailed, Hamza Hussein, Mahmoud Abu Warda, Dawoud Iraqi, Ahmed Daghim and Gibrán Haj Yousef withdrew due to their club's refusal to release them.

Head coach: (Palestine) Ihab Abu Jazar

No.	Pos.	Player	Date of birth (age)	Club
1	GK	Mohammed Ahmed	18 February 1999 (aged 24)	(Palestinian Football Association) Markaz Shabab Al-Am'ari
2	DF	Walid Qonbor	24 April 1999 (aged 24)	(Palestinian Football Association) Jabal Al-Mukaber
3	DF	Ahmed Kullab	8 November 2001 (aged 21)	(Palestinian Football Association) Ittihad Khanyounis
4	DF	Ali Rabei	9 October 2002 (aged 20)	(Palestinian Football Association) Ahli Al-Khalil
5	DF	Mohammed Saleh*	18 July 1993 (aged 30)	(Egyptian Football Association) Al Ittihad
6	DF	Ibrahim Abu Ameer	18 October 2002 (aged 20)	(Palestinian Football Association) Markaz Balata
7	FW	Khaled Al-Nabris	27 March 2003 (aged 20)	(Palestinian Football Association) Ittihad Khanyounis
8	MF	Mohammed Nazzal	26 June 2001 (aged 22)	(Palestinian Football Association) Hilal Al-Quds
9	FW	Zaid Qunbar	4 September 2002 (aged 21)	(Palestinian Football Association) Jabal Al-Mukaber
10	MF	Anas Bani Odeh	6 September 2001 (aged 22)	(Palestinian Football Association) Shabab Al-Dhahiriya
11	MF	Samer Zubaida	26 April 2001 (aged 22)	(Palestinian Football Association) Hilal Al-Quds
13	MF	Sadeq Obaid	26 April 2002 (aged 21)	(Palestinian Football Association) Hilal Al-Quds
14	MF	Ameed Sawafta	10 July 2000 (aged 23)	(Palestinian Football Association) Markaz Balata
15	DF	Wajdi Nabhan	27 July 2001 (aged 22)	(Palestinian Football Association) Al-Bireh
16	GK	Matías Medina	17 March 2003 (aged 20)	(Football Federation of Chile) Real San Joaquín
17	FW	Mohammed Direya	2 July 2001 (aged 22)	(Latvian Football Federation) Valmiera
20	MF	Farick Haddad	19 December 2002 (aged 20)	(Football Federation of Chile) Unión La Calera
21	DF	Ahmed Fadi Qatmish	28 November 1999 (aged 23)	(Palestinian Football Association) Markaz Balata
22	GK	Anwar Al-Aqraa	30 June 2002 (aged 21)	(Palestinian Football Association) Islami Qalqilya

* Over-aged player.

=== Qatar ===
The following 22 players list is the Qatar squad for the 2022 Asian Games.

Head coach: (Portugal) Ilídio Vale

No.	Pos.	Player	Date of birth (age)	Club
1	GK	Yousef Baliadeh	30 October 2002 (age 24)	(Qatar Football Association) Al-Shamal
2	DF	Abdullah Yousif	10 April 2002 (age 24)	(Qatar Football Association) Al-Gharafa
3	DF	Saifeldeen Fadlalla	31 March 2003 (age 23)	(Qatar Football Association) Al-Gharafa
4	DF	Mohamed Aiash	27 February 2001 (age 25)	(Qatar Football Association) Al-Rayyan
5	MF	Abdelrahman Raafat	8 September 2002 (age 24)	(Qatar Football Association) Umm Salal
6	MF	Osama Al-Tairi	16 June 2002 (age 24)	(Qatar Football Association) Al-Rayyan
7	FW	Lotfi Madjer	1 May 2002 (age 24)	(Qatar Football Association) Al-Duhail
8	MF	Naif Al-Hadhrami	18 July 2001 (age 25)	(Qatar Football Association) Al-Rayyan
9	FW	Tameem Al-Abdullah	5 October 2002 (age 24)	(Qatar Football Association) Al-Rayyan
10	FW	Khalid Ali Sabah	5 October 2001 (age 25)	(Qatar Football Association) Al-Rayyan
11	DF	Abdelrahman Rashid	20 November 2001 (age 25)	(Qatar Football Association) Al Sadd
12	DF	Abdulla Al-Salati	11 August 2002 (age 24)	(Qatar Football Association) Al-Arabi
13	DF	Abdullah Al-Ali	20 November 2001 (age 25)	(Qatar Football Association) Al-Rayyan
14	FW	Elyas Barimil	18 April 2001 (age 25)	(Qatar Football Association) Umm Salal
15	DF	Jassem Gaber	20 February 2002 (age 24)	(Qatar Football Association) Al-Arabi
16	FW	Mohamed Surag	21 April 2003 (age 23)	(Qatar Football Association) Al-Rayyan
17	MF	Mahdi Salem	4 April 2004 (age 22)	(Qatar Football Association) Al-Shamal
18	MF	Mostafa Meshaal	28 March 2001 (age 25)	(Qatar Football Association) Al Sadd
19	MF	Nabil Irfan	7 February 2004 (age 22)	(Qatar Football Association) Al-Wakrah
20	FW	Ahmed Al-Rawi	30 May 2004 (age 22)	(Qatar Football Association) Al-Rayyan
21	GK	Ali Nader Mahmoud	7 July 2002 (age 24)	(Qatar Football Association) Al-Khor
22	GK	Amir Hassan	22 April 2004 (age 22)	(Qatar Football Association) Al-Arabi

== Group E ==
=== South Korea ===
The following 22 players list is the South Korea squad for the 2022 Asian Games.

Head Coach: (South Korea) Hwang Sun-hong

No.	Pos.	Player	Date of birth (age)	Club
1	GK	Lee Gwang-yeon	11 September 1999 (aged 24)	(Korea Football Association) Gangwon FC
2	DF	Hwang Jae-won	16 August 2002 (aged 21)	(Korea Football Association) Daegu FC
3	DF	Choi Jun	17 April 1999 (aged 24)	(Korea Football Association) Busan IPark
4	DF	Park Jin-seob*	23 October 1995 (aged 27)	(Korea Football Association) Jeonbuk Hyundai Motors
5	DF	Lee Jae-ik	21 May 1999 (aged 24)	(Korea Football Association) Seoul E-Land
6	MF	Hong Hyun-seok	16 June 1999 (aged 24)	(Royal Belgian Football Association) Gent
7	MF	Jeong Woo-yeong	20 September 1999 (aged 23)	(German Football Association) VfB Stuttgart
8	MF	Paik Seung-ho*	17 March 1997 (aged 26)	(Korea Football Association) Jeonbuk Hyundai Motors
9	FW	Park Jae-yong	13 March 2000 (aged 23)	(Korea Football Association) Jeonbuk Hyundai Motors
10	MF	Cho Young-wook	5 February 1999 (aged 24)	(Korea Football Association) Gimcheon Sangmu
11	MF	Um Won-sang	6 January 1999 (aged 24)	(Korea Football Association) Ulsan Hyundai
12	GK	Min Seong-jun	22 July 1999 (aged 24)	(Korea Football Association) Incheon United
13	MF	Goh Young-jun	9 July 2001 (aged 22)	(Korea Football Association) Pohang Steelers
14	DF	Lee Han-beom	17 June 2002 (aged 21)	(Danish Football Association) Midtjylland
15	MF	Jeong Ho-yeon	28 September 2000 (aged 22)	(Korea Football Association) Gwangju FC
16	DF	Kim Tae-hyeon	17 September 2000 (aged 23)	(Japan Football Association) Vegalta Sendai
17	MF	Song Min-kyu	12 September 1999 (aged 24)	(Korea Football Association) Jeonbuk Hyundai Motors
18	MF	Lee Kang-in	19 February 2001 (aged 22)	(French Football Federation) Paris Saint-Germain
19	DF	Seol Young-woo*	5 December 1998 (aged 24)	(Korea Football Association) Ulsan Hyundai
20	FW	An Jae-jun	3 April 2001 (aged 22)	(Korea Football Association) Bucheon FC 1995
21	GK	Kim Jeong-hoon	20 April 2001 (aged 22)	(Korea Football Association) Jeonbuk Hyundai Motors
22	DF	Park Kyu-hyun	14 April 2001 (aged 22)	(German Football Association) Dynamo Dresden

* Over-aged player.

=== Bahrain ===
The following 21 players list is the Bahrain squad for the 2022 Asian Games.

Head Coach: (Croatia) Dario Bašić

No.	Pos.	Player	Date of birth (age)	Club
2	DF	Ahmed Dheyaa	17 August 2003 (age 23)	(Bahrain Football Association) East Riffa
3	DF	Abdulla Al-Khulasi	2 September 2003 (age 23)	(Bahrain Football Association) Al-Muharraq
4	DF	Hani Taha	18 December 2001 (age 24)	(Bahrain Football Association) Al-Hidd
5	MF	Ali Adnan Al-Banna*	21 July 1994 (age 32)	(Bahrain Football Association) Al-Muharraq
6	DF	Hasan Isa	14 October 2001 (age 25)	(Bahrain Football Association) Al-Malkiya
7	MF	Hasan Abdulnabi	25 March 2001 (age 25)	(Bahrain Football Association) Al-Shabab
8	DF	Mahmood Mohamed	11 November 2004 (age 22)	(Bahrain Football Association) Al-Shabab
9	FW	Husain Abdulkarim	17 May 2002 (age 24)	(Bahrain Football Association) Isa Town
10	MF	Mubarak Mohamed	18 August 2003 (age 23)	(Bahrain Football Association) Al-Muharraq
11	MF	Sayed Jawad Haider	7 January 2002 (age 24)	(Bahrain Football Association) Al-Shabab
12	DF	Ahmed Abdulhameed	7 June 2002 (age 24)	(Bahrain Football Association) Sitra
13	FW	Abdulla Al-Subaie	22 August 2004 (age 22)	(Bahrain Football Association) Al-Hidd
15	MF	Husain Haroona	31 July 2001 (age 25)	(Bahrain Football Association) Al-Malkiya
16	DF	Sayed Mohamed Adnan*	5 February 1983 (age 43)	(Bahrain Football Association) Al-Hidd
17	DF	Mohammed Qayoom	4 June 2001 (age 25)	(Bahrain Football Association) Al-Riffa
18	FW	Abdullah Nemer	29 July 2002 (age 24)	(Bahrain Football Association) Al-Najma
19	MF	Salman Abdulla	7 February 2002 (age 24)	(Bahrain Football Association) Al-Riffa
20	DF	Ali Mohamed Redha	27 November 2001 (age 24)	(Bahrain Football Association) Al-Shabab
21	GK	Abdullah Al-Ahmad	9 April 2003 (age 23)	(Bahrain Football Association) Al-Riffa
22	GK	Salman Adel	5 April 2001 (age 25)	(Bahrain Football Association) Isa Town
25	GK	Khalil Ebrahim	2 May 2001 (age 25)	(Bahrain Football Association) Al-Tadamon

* Over-aged player.

=== Thailand ===
The following 22 players list is the Thailand squad for the 2022 Asian Games. The squad was reduced to 21 players following the withdrawal of Sittichok Paso, but he remained in the squad list.

Head Coach: (Thailand) Issara Sritaro

No.	Pos.	Player	Date of birth (age)	Club
1	GK	Nopphon Lakhonphon	19 July 2000 (aged 23)	(Football Association of Thailand) Buriram United
2	DF	Pongsakorn Trisat	12 September 2003 (aged 20)	(Football Association of Thailand) Chonburi
3	DF	Maximilian Steinbauer	29 April 2001 (aged 22)	Unattached
4	DF	Anusak Jaiphet	23 June 1999 (aged 24)	(Football Association of Thailand) Nakhon Pathom United
5	DF	Songchai Thongcham	9 June 2001 (aged 22)	(Football Association of Thailand) Chonburi
6	DF	Kritsada Nontharat	16 February 2001 (aged 22)	(Football Association of Thailand) Bangkok United
7	MF	Purachet Thodsanit	9 May 2001 (aged 22)	(Football Association of Thailand) Muangthong United
8	MF	Chayapipat Supunpasuch	25 February 2001 (aged 22)	(Football Association of Thailand) Port
9	FW	Yotsakorn Burapha	8 June 2005 (aged 18)	(Football Association of Thailand) Chonburi
10	FW	Sittichok Paso	28 January 1999 (aged 24)	(Football Association of Thailand) Chonburi
11	DF	Nakin Wisetchat	9 July 1999 (aged 24)	(Football Association of Thailand) Port
12	DF	Apisit Saenseekammuan	11 October 2002 (aged 20)	(Football Association of Thailand) Nongbua Pitchaya
13	MF	Kittisak Putchan	2 February 2001 (aged 22)	(Football Association of Thailand) Uthai Thani
14	FW	Phitak Pimpae	14 January 2000 (aged 23)	(Football Association of Thailand) Chonburi
15	DF	Jakkapong Sanmahung	6 April 2002 (aged 21)	(Football Association of Thailand) Chonburi
16	MF	Sirimongkol Rattanapoom	21 May 2002 (aged 21)	(Royal Belgian Football Association) OH Leuven
17	DF	Waris Choolthong	8 January 2004 (aged 19)	(Football Association of Thailand) BG Pathum United
18	MF	Sittha Boonlha	2 September 2004 (aged 19)	(Football Association of Thailand) Port
19	FW	Phanthamit Praphanth	12 September 2003 (aged 20)	(Football Association of Thailand) PT Prachuap
20	GK	Thirawut Sraunson	10 November 2001 (aged 21)	(Football Association of Thailand) Kasetsart
21	DF	Bukkoree Lemdee	11 March 2004 (aged 19)	(Football Association of Thailand) Chonburi
22	GK	Siriwat Ingkaew	11 January 2001 (aged 22)	(Football Association of Thailand) Phrae United

=== Kuwait ===
The following 21 players list is the Kuwait squad for the 2022 Asian Games. Originally named in the final squad, Salman Al-Bose withdrew and was not replaced.

Head Coach: (Portugal) Emílio Peixe

No.	Pos.	Player	Date of birth (age)	Club
1	GK	Abdulrahman Al-Fadhli	23 March 2001 (aged 22)	(Kuwait Football Association) Al-Salmiya
2	DF	Abdulrahman Al-Daihani	21 January 2001 (aged 22)	(Kuwait Football Association) Al-Qadsia
3	DF	Faisal Al-Shatti	19 May 2002 (aged 21)	(Kuwait Football Association) Al-Qadsia
4	DF	Youssef Al-Haqqan	5 February 2002 (aged 21)	(Kuwait Football Association) Al-Qadsia
5	DF	Khaled Al-Fadhli	23 February 2002 (aged 21)	(Kuwait Football Association) Al-Qadsia
6	DF	Abdulaziz Mahran	19 August 2001 (aged 22)	(Kuwait Football Association) Al-Nasr
7	MF	Hamad Al-Taweel	26 July 2001 (aged 22)	(Kuwait Football Association) Khaitan
8	MF	Fahad Al-Fadhli	4 February 2001 (aged 22)	(Kuwait Football Association) Kazma
9	FW	Salman Al-Awadi	21 May 2001 (aged 22)	(Kuwait Football Association) Al-Arabi
10	MF	Bandar Al Salamah	28 October 2002 (aged 20)	(Kuwait Football Association) Al-Arabi
11	DF	Othman Al-Dosari	29 May 2002 (aged 21)	(Kuwait Football Association) Al-Salmiya
12	DF	Mohsen Falah	11 November 2004 (aged 18)	(Kuwait Football Association) Al-Kuwait
13	DF	Sultan Al-Faraj	16 June 2001 (aged 22)	(Kuwait Football Association) Al-Kuwait
14	MF	Badr Jamal	16 August 2002 (aged 21)	(Kuwait Football Association) Fahaheel
15	DF	Muhammad Al-Rashed	2 April 2003 (aged 20)	(Kuwait Football Association) Al-Kuwait
17	FW	Talal Al-Qaissi	21 June 2002 (aged 21)	(Kuwait Football Association) Kazma
18	MF	Bader Al-Mutairi	26 September 2003 (aged 19)	(Kuwait Football Association) Al-Arabi
19	MF	Fahd Al-Harbi	16 November 2002 (aged 20)	(Kuwait Football Association) Al-Kuwait
21	FW	Fahad Al-Azmi	1 January 2003 (aged 20)	(Kuwait Football Association) Al-Salmiya
22	GK	Dhari Al-Otaibi	31 March 2002 (aged 21)	(Kuwait Football Association) Al-Kuwait
23	GK	Abdulaziz Al-Bahr	19 September 2001 (aged 22)	(Kuwait Football Association) Al-Qadsia

== Group F ==
=== North Korea ===
The following 22 players list is the North Korea squad for the 2022 Asian Games.

Head Coach: (North Korea) Sin Yong-nam

No.	Pos.	Player	Date of birth (age)	Caps	Goals	Club
1	GK	Kang Ju-hyok*	31 May 1997 (aged 26)	5	0	(DPR Korea Football Association) Hwaebul
2	FW	Hwang Chan-jun	5 August 2002 (aged 21)	0	0	(Japan Football Association) Korean University
3	DF	Jang Kuk-chol*	16 February 1994 (aged 29)	17	4	(DPR Korea Football Association) Hwaebul
4	MF	Kim Pom-hyok	15 April 2000 (aged 23)	0	0	(DPR Korea Football Association) Ryomyong
5	DF	Kim Kyong-sok	19 February 2000 (aged 23)	2	0	(DPR Korea Football Association) Sonbong
6	DF	Pak Kwang-chon	12 January 1999 (aged 24)	3	0	(DPR Korea Football Association) Ryomyong
7	MF	Kim Hyon	6 March 2000 (aged 23)	0	0	(DPR Korea Football Association) Amnokgang
8	MF	Kye Tam	6 October 2000 (aged 22)	0	0	(DPR Korea Football Association) Ryomyong
9	FW	Ri Jo-guk	9 May 2002 (aged 21)	0	0	(DPR Korea Football Association) Ryomyong
10	FW	Ri Il-song	14 January 2004 (aged 19)	0	0	(DPR Korea Football Association) Ryomyong
11	FW	Kim Kuk-jin	11 October 2000 (aged 22)	6	0	(DPR Korea Football Association) Kigwancha
12	MF	Kim Ji-song	19 February 1999 (aged 24)	0	0	(DPR Korea Football Association) Ryomyong
13	DF	Chae Yu-song	15 November 2002 (aged 20)	0	0	(DPR Korea Football Association) Ryomyong
14	MF	Chon Tae-ryong	17 August 2000 (aged 23)	0	0	(DPR Korea Football Association) Amnokgang
15	DF	Jang Un-gwang	28 December 2000 (aged 22)	0	0	(DPR Korea Football Association) Amnokgang
16	DF	Kim Yu-song	18 July 2003 (aged 20)	0	0	(DPR Korea Football Association) Amnokgang
17	DF	Kang Kuk-chol	29 September 1999 (aged 23)	5	0	(DPR Korea Football Association) Rimyongsu
18	GK	Sin Tae-song	30 May 2000 (aged 23)	0	0	(DPR Korea Football Association) April 25
19	DF	Ri Thae-ha	16 January 2003 (aged 20)	0	0	(Japan Football Association) Korean University
20	MF	Paek Chung-song	25 February 2002 (aged 21)	0	0	(DPR Korea Football Association) Ryomyong
21	GK	Yu Kwang-jun	5 November 2000 (aged 22)	0	0	(DPR Korea Football Association) Ryomyong
22	MF	Kim Kuk-bom*	19 February 1995 (aged 28)	8	0	(DPR Korea Football Association) Ryomyong

* Over-aged player.

=== Indonesia ===
The following 22 players list is the Indonesia squad for the 2022 Asian Games.

Head Coach: (Indonesia) Indra Sjafri

No.	Pos.	Player	Date of birth (age)	Caps	Goals	Club
1	GK	Adi Satryo	7 July 2001 (aged 22)	4	0	(Football Association of Indonesia) PSIS Semarang
2	DF	Bagas Kaffa	16 January 2002 (aged 21)	8	0	(Football Association of Indonesia) Barito Putera
3	DF	Andy Setyo*	16 September 1997 (aged 26)	0	0	(Football Association of Indonesia) Persikabo 1973
4	DF	Kadek Arel	4 April 2005 (aged 18)	4	0	(Football Association of Indonesia) Bali United
5	DF	Rizky Ridho (captain)	21 November 2001 (aged 21)	19	1	(Football Association of Indonesia) Persija Jakarta
6	MF	Ananda Raehan	17 December 2003 (aged 19)	7	0	(Football Association of Indonesia) PSM Makassar
7	MF	Beckham Putra	29 October 2001 (aged 21)	12	3	(Football Association of Indonesia) Persib Bandung
8	DF	George Brown	4 June 1999 (aged 24)	0	0	(Football Association of Indonesia) Persebaya Surabaya
9	FW	Ramadhan Sananta	27 November 2002 (aged 20)	13	8	(Football Association of Indonesia) Persis Solo
10	MF	Egy Maulana	7 July 2000 (aged 23)	18	8	(Football Association of Indonesia) Dewa United
11	MF	Ramai Rumakiek	19 April 2002 (aged 21)	4	0	(Football Association of Indonesia) Persipura Jayapura
12	DF	Dony Tri Pamungkas	11 January 2005 (aged 18)	0	0	(Football Association of Indonesia) Persija Jakarta
13	MF	Rachmat Irianto	3 September 1999 (aged 24)	22	1	(Football Association of Indonesia) Persib Bandung
14	MF	Robi Darwis	22 August 2003 (aged 20)	3	0	(Football Association of Indonesia) Persib Bandung
15	MF	Taufany Muslihuddin	24 March 2002 (aged 21)	6	1	(Football Association of Indonesia) Borneo Samarinda
16	DF	Haykal Alhafiz	24 March 2001 (aged 22)	8	0	(Football Association of Indonesia) PSIS Semarang
17	MF	Syahrian Abimanyu	25 April 1999 (aged 24)	14	0	(Football Association of Indonesia) Persija Jakarta
18	FW	Titan Agung	5 June 2001 (aged 22)	5	2	(Football Association of Indonesia) Bhayangkara
19	DF	Alfeandra Dewangga	28 June 2001 (aged 22)	20	0	(Football Association of Indonesia) PSIS Semarang
20	GK	Ernando Ari	27 February 2002 (aged 21)	21	0	(Football Association of Indonesia) Persebaya Surabaya
21	FW	Hugo Samir	25 January 2005 (aged 18)	0	0	(Football Association of Indonesia) Borneo Samarinda
22	GK	Daffa Fasya	7 May 2004 (aged 19)	0	0	(Football Association of Indonesia) Borneo Samarinda

* Over-aged player.

=== Kyrgyzstan ===
The following 20 players list is the Kyrgyzstan squad for the 2022 Asian Games.

Head Coach: (Russia) Maksim Lisitsyn

No.	Pos.	Player	Date of birth (age)	Club
1	GK	Nursultan Nusupov	22 July 2004 (age 22)	(Kyrgyz Football Union) Talant
2	DF	Adilet Nurlan Uulu	30 March 2002 (age 24)	(Kyrgyz Football Union) Dordoi Bishkek
3	DF	Elaman Akylbekov	11 August 2003 (age 23)	(Kyrgyz Football Union) Alay
4	DF	Bayaman Kumarbay Uulu	6 February 2001 (age 25)	(Kyrgyz Football Union) Alga Bishkek
5	DF	Bekzatbek Nasirov	5 February 2002 (age 24)	(Kyrgyz Football Union) Neftchi Kochkorata
6	MF	Adilet Kanybekov	25 November 2002 (age 23)	(Kyrgyz Football Union) Neftchi Kochkorata
7	FW	Atai Ilichbek Uulu	18 March 2004 (age 22)	(Kyrgyz Football Union) Ilbirs Bishkek
8	MF	Islam Mezhitov	4 January 2000 (age 26)	(Kyrgyz Football Union) Abdysh-Ata Kant
9	FW	Nurbol Baktybekov	23 February 2004 (age 22)	(Kyrgyz Football Union) Ilbirs Bishkek
10	FW	Bektur Abdyvaliev	29 April 2003 (age 23)	(Kyrgyz Football Union) Dordoi Bishkek
11	FW	Maksat Alygulov	21 December 2000 (age 25)	(Kyrgyz Football Union) Alga Bishkek
13	GK	Artem Pryadkin	18 September 2001 (age 25)	(Kyrgyz Football Union) Dordoi Bishkek
14	MF	Irrakhimbek Nurmat Uulu	27 January 2003 (age 23)	(Kyrgyz Football Union) Neftchi Kochkor-Ata
16	GK	Kurmanbek Nurlanbekov	1 April 2004 (age 22)	(Kyrgyz Football Union) Dordoi Bishkek
17	DF	Arslan Bekberdinov	14 August 2003 (age 23)	(Kyrgyz Football Union) Abdysh-Ata Kant
18	MF	Mirlan Bekberdinov	14 August 2003 (age 23)	(Kyrgyz Football Union) Ilbirs Bishkek
19	FW	Dastanbek Toktosunov	2 September 2002 (age 24)	(Kyrgyz Football Union) Neftchi Kochkor-Ata
20	MF	Midin Kerezbekov	13 January 2001 (age 25)	(Kyrgyz Football Union) Talant
21	FW	Ernaz Abilov	30 March 2001 (age 25)	(Kyrgyz Football Union) Alga Bishkek
23	MF	Arsen Sharshenbekov	16 March 2004 (age 22)	(Russian Football Union) Alania Vladikavkaz

=== Chinese Taipei ===
The following 21 players list is the Chinese Taipei squad for the 2022 Asian Games.

Head Coach: (Chinese Taipei) Chen Jiunn-ming

No.	Pos.	Player	Date of birth (age)	Club
1	GK	Chiu Yu-hung*	31 August 1994 (aged 29)	(Chinese Taipei Football Association) Taipower
2	DF	Huang Tzu-ming	18 November 2000 (aged 22)	(Chinese Taipei Football Association) Taipower
3	DF	Tu Shao-chieh	2 January 1999 (aged 24)	(Chinese Taipei Football Association) Taipower
5	DF	Wang Yi-you	29 November 1999 (aged 23)	(German Football Association) SGS Essen
6	DF	Liang Meng-hsin	3 April 2003 (aged 20)	(Chinese Taipei Football Association) Taichung Futuro
7	MF	Lin Ming-wei	20 May 2001 (aged 22)	(Chinese Taipei Football Association) Taiwan Steel
8	MF	Wu Yen-shu	21 October 1999 (aged 23)	(Chinese Football Association) Liaoning Shenyang Urban
9	FW	Lin Wei-chieh	9 October 1999 (aged 23)	(Chinese Taipei Football Association) Taiwan Steel
10	MF	Tsai Cheng-ju	2 January 1999 (aged 24)	(Chinese Taipei Football Association) Taipei Dragons
11	MF	Yu Yao-hsing	12 February 2002 (aged 21)	(Chinese Taipei Football Association) Ming Chuan University
12	MF	Wen Chih-hao*	25 March 1993 (aged 30)	(Chinese Taipei Football Association) Taipower
13	FW	Chen Po-yu	29 February 2000 (aged 23)	(Chinese Taipei Football Association) Taiwan Steel
14	FW	Wang Sheng-han	9 March 1999 (aged 24)	(Chinese Taipei Football Association) Taipower
15	DF	Ma Liang-cheng	16 April 1999 (aged 24)	(Chinese Taipei Football Association) Ming Chuan University
16	DF	Chin Wen-yen	30 May 2000 (aged 23)	(Chinese Taipei Football Association) Taipei Dragons
17	FW	Chen Po-liang*	11 August 1988 (aged 35)	(Chinese Football Association) Qingdao West Coast
18	GK	Li Guan-pei	7 May 2000 (aged 23)	(Chinese Taipei Football Association) Taiwan Steel
19	DF	Fang Li-peng	13 July 1999 (aged 24)	(Chinese Taipei Football Association) Hang Yuen
20	DF	Lin Chun-kai	11 August 1988 (aged 35)	(Chinese Taipei Football Association) Taipei Dragons
21	MF	Lan Hao-yu	13 January 1999 (aged 24)	(Chinese Taipei Football Association) Leopard Cat
22	GK	Lai Po-lun	25 June 1999 (aged 24)	(Chinese Taipei Football Association) Hang Yuen

* Over-aged player.

== See also ==
- Football at the 2022 Asian Games – Women's team squads
