= 2022 AFC U-23 Asian Cup qualification =

Tournament details
- Host countries: Qatar (Group A); Tajikistan (Group B); Bahrain (Group C); Uzbekistan (Group D); United Arab Emirates (Group E); Jordan (Group F); Tajikistan (Group G); Singapore (Group H); Kyrgyzstan (Group I); Mongolia (Group J); Japan (Group K)
- Dates: 23 October – 2 November 2021
- Teams: 38 (from 1 confederation)
- Venues: 12 (in 10 host cities)

Tournament statistics
- Matches played: 50
- Goals scored: 146 (2.92 per match)
- Attendance: 29,433 (589 per match)
- Top scorer(s): (South Korea) Park Jeong-in (5 goals)

The 2022 AFC U-23 Asian Cup qualification was an international men's under-23 football competition which decided the participating teams of the 2022 AFC U-23 Asian Cup.

A total of 16 teams qualified to play in the final tournament, including Uzbekistan who qualified automatically as hosts country.

Due to non-compliance to doping regulations, the World Anti-Doping Agency (WADA) banned Indonesia and Thailand from using their national flags in competitions, except during the Olympics. It was reported that Indonesia prepared the flag of its federation, in the event its team was barred from using the national flag.

== Draw ==
Out of the 47 AFC member associations, a total of 42 teams entered the competition. The final tournament hosts Uzbekistan decided to participate in qualification. Their matches were not taken into account when calculating the group ranking and best second-placed teams among the groups.

The draw was held on 9 July 2021, 12:00 (UTC+5), in Tashkent, Uzbekistan. The 42 teams were drawn into nine groups of four teams and two groups of three teams. For the draw, teams were divided into two zones:

- West Zone: 23 teams from West Asia, Central Asia and South Asia, to be drawn into five groups of four teams and one group of three teams (Groups A–F).
- East Zone: 19 teams from ASEAN and East Asia, to be drawn into four groups of four teams and one group of three teams (Groups G–K).

The teams were seeded according to their performance in the 2020 AFC U-23 Championship final tournament and qualification (overall ranking shown in parentheses). The eleven teams which indicated their intention to serve as qualification group hosts prior to the draw were drawn into separate groups.

On 29 July, North Korea withdrew from the competition due to safety concerns related to the COVID-19 pandemic. As a result, to better balance of the number of teams across all groups, the AFC conducted a draw on 11 August to move one team from Groups G to J, which was Hong Kong, who were placed in Group K. On 11 October, China also withdrew from the competition for the same reason, leaving Group G with only two teams.

	Pot 1	Pot 2	Pot 3	Pot 4
West Zone	1. **Saudi Arabia** (2); 2. Syria (4); 3. **Jordan** (5) **(H)**; 4. **United Arab Emirates** (7) **(H)**; 5. **Iran** (8); 6. **Iraq** (9)	7. **Qatar** (10) **(H)**; 8. Bahrain (13) **(H)**; 9. **Tajikistan** (16) **(H)**; 10. Oman (17); 11. Palestine (20); 12. Bangladesh (23)	13. **Kuwait** (24) **~~(H)~~**; 14. Afghanistan (25) **(W)**; 15. **Turkmenistan** (26); 16. India (27); 17. Lebanon (30); 18. Yemen (33)	19. Kyrgyzstan (36) **(H)***; 20. Nepal (37); 21. Maldives (40); 22. Sri Lanka (41); 23. **Uzbekistan (Q), (H)***
East Zone	1. **South Korea** (1); 2. **Australia** (3); 3. **Thailand** (6); 4. North Korea (11) **(W)**; 5. **Vietnam** (12)	6. **Japan** (14) **(H)***; 7. China (15) **(W)**; 8. **Malaysia** (18); 9. Myanmar (19); 10. Singapore (21) **(H)**	11. Hong Kong (22); 12. Indonesia (28) **~~(H)~~**; 13. Laos (29); 14. Cambodia (31); 15. Timor-Leste (32)	16. Chinese Taipei (34) **~~(H)~~**; 17. Mongolia (35) **(H)**; 18. Philippines (38); 19. Brunei (39) **(W)**

Notes

- Teams in **bold** qualified for the final tournament.
- (H): Qualification group hosts determined before the draw
- (H)*: Qualification group hosts determined after the draw
- (Q): Final tournament hosts, automatically qualified regardless of qualification results
- (W): Withdrew after draw

Did not enter
West Zone	Bhutan; Pakistan **(X)**
East Zone	Guam; Macau; Northern Mariana Islands

Notes

- (X): Suspended

=== Draw result ===
The draw resulted in following groups.

Group A
Pos	Team
A1	Syria
A2	**Qatar**
A3	Yemen
A4	Sri Lanka

Group B
Pos	Team
B1	**Iran**
B2	**Tajikistan**
B3	Lebanon
B4	Nepal

Group C
Pos	Team
C1	**Iraq**
C2	Bahrain
C3	Afghanistan (Note: Withdrew from the tournament.)
C4	Maldives

Group D
Pos	Team
D1	**Saudi Arabia**
D2	Bangladesh
D3	**Kuwait**
D4	**Uzbekistan**

Group E
Pos	Team
E1	**United Arab Emirates**
E2	Oman
E3	India
E4	Kyrgyzstan

Group F
Pos	Team
F1	**Jordan**
F2	Palestine
F3	**Turkmenistan**

Group G
Pos	Team
G1	**Australia**
G2	China
G3	Indonesia
G4	Brunei

Group H
Pos	Team
H1	**South Korea**
H2	Singapore
H3	Timor-Leste
H4	Philippines

Group I
Pos	Team
I1	**Vietnam**
I2	Myanmar
I3	Chinese Taipei

Group J
Pos	Team
J1	**Thailand**
J2	**Malaysia**
J3	Laos
J4	Mongolia

Group K
Pos	Team
K1	Hong Kong
K2	**Japan**
K3	Cambodia
K4	North Korea

Bold indicates that the team has qualified for the final tournament.

== Player eligibility ==
Players born on or after 1 January 1999 were eligible to compete in the tournament.

== Format ==
In each group, teams played each other once at a centralized venue. The eleven group winners and the four best runners-up qualified for the final tournament.

In group G, after the withdrawal of Brunei and China PR, the two teams left (Australia and Indonesia) played each other twice. The winner qualified for the final tournament, with the loser eliminated.

=== Tiebreakers ===
Teams were ranked according to points (3 points for a win, 1 point for a draw, 0 points for a loss), and if tied on points, the following tiebreaking criteria were applied, in the order given, to determine the rankings.

1. Points in head-to-head matches among tied teams;
2. Goal difference in head-to-head matches among tied teams;
3. Goals scored in head-to-head matches among tied teams;
4. If more than two teams are tied, and after applying all head-to-head criteria above, a subset of teams are still tied, all head-to-head criteria above were reapplied exclusively to this subset of teams;
5. Goal difference in all group matches;
6. Goals scored in all group matches;
7. Penalty shoot-out if only two teams are tied and they met in the last round of the group;
8. Disciplinary points (yellow card = 1 point, red card as a result of two yellow cards = 3 points, direct red card = 3 points, yellow card followed by direct red card = 4 points);
9. Drawing of lots.

== Groups ==
All matches were played between 23 October and 2 November 2021.

=== Group A ===
- All matches were held in Qatar.
- Times listed are UTC+3.

Pos	Team	Pld	W	D	L	GF	GA	GD	Pts	Qualification
1	Qatar (H)	3	2	1	0	9	1	+8	7	Final tournament
2	Syria	3	1	2	0	6	1	+5	5	
3	Yemen	3	1	1	1	3	3	0	4	
4	Sri Lanka	3	0	0	3	0	13	−13	0	

Source: AFC
Rules for classification: Qualification tiebreakers
(H) Hosts
25 October 2021
18:00

Qatar	3–0	Yemen
Ali 14', 42'; Mohammed 63'	Report

Khalifa International Stadium, Doha
Attendance: 543
Referee: Ma Ning (China PR)
25 October 2021
20:00

Syria	5–0	Sri Lanka
Malta 1'; Bashmani 25', 85'; Al-Hallak 42'; Basith 70' (o.g.)	Report

Suheim bin Hamad Stadium, Doha
Attendance: 340
Referee: Chen Hsin-chuan (Chinese Taipei)

28 October 2021
18:00

Sri Lanka	0–5	Qatar
	Report	Ali 28' (pen.), 90' (pen.); Abdurisag 39'; Al-Hadhrami 54'; Suhail 61'

Khalifa International Stadium, Doha
Attendance: 255
Referee: Baraa Aisha (Palestine)
28 October 2021
20:00

Yemen	0–0	Syria
	Report

Suheim bin Hamad Stadium, Doha
Attendance: 214
Referee: Ismaeel Habib (Bahrain)

31 October 2021
18:00

Syria	1–1	Qatar
Abdurisag 18' (o.g.)	Report	Waad 45' (pen.)

Khalifa International Stadium, Doha
Attendance: 460
Referee: Ahmad Yacoub Ibrahim (Jordan)
31 October 2021
18:00

Yemen	3–0	Sri Lanka
Al-Dahi 30'; Al-Godaimah 60'; Al-Gahwashi 68'	Report

Suheim bin Hamad Stadium, Doha
Attendance: 50
Referee: Baraa Aisha (Palestine)

=== Group B ===
- All matches were held in Tajikistan.
- Times listed are UTC+5.

Pos	Team	Pld	W	D	L	GF	GA	GD	Pts	Qualification
1	Iran	3	3	0	0	9	2	+7	9	Final tournament
2	Tajikistan (H)	3	2	0	1	9	3	+6	6	Final tournament
3	Lebanon	3	1	0	2	4	3	+1	3	
4	Nepal	3	0	0	3	0	14	−14	0	

Source: AFC
Rules for classification: Qualification tiebreakers
(H) Hosts
25 October 2021
16:00

Iran	4–0	Nepal
Limouchi 46'; Nokhodkar 77', 79'; Salmani 90+3'	Report

Central Republican Stadium, Dushanbe
Attendance: 250
Referee: Suhaizi Shukri (Malaysia)
25 October 2021
19:00

Tajikistan	1–0	Lebanon
Hanonov 88'	Report

Central Republican Stadium, Dushanbe
Attendance: 4,200
Referee: Rowan Arumughan (India)

28 October 2021
16:00

Lebanon	0–2	Iran
	Report	Limouchi 5'; Kor 90+4'

Central Republican Stadium, Dushanbe
Attendance: 450
Referee: Tejas Nagvenkar (India)
28 October 2021
19:00

Nepal	0–6	Tajikistan
	Report	Mabatshoev 24'; Solehov 32'; Soirov 40'; Azizboev 61'; Hanonov 68' (pen.); Emomali 72'

Central Republican Stadium, Dushanbe
Attendance: 4,500
Referee: Ammar Ashkanani (Kuwait)

31 October 2021
16:00

Lebanon	4–0	Nepal
Farran 26', 47'; Nasser 74'; Haidar 82'	Report

Central Republican Stadium, Dushanbe
Attendance: 200
Referee: Adam Fazeel (Maldives)
31 October 2021
19:00

Iran	3–2	Tajikistan
Salmani 13', 19', 45'	Report	Zoirov 10'; Panjshanbe 22' (pen.)

Central Republican Stadium, Dushanbe
Attendance: 7,200
Referee: Kim Woo-sung (South Korea)

=== Group C ===
- All matches were held in Bahrain.
- Times listed are UTC+3.

Pos	Team	Pld	W	D	L	GF	GA	GD	Pts	Qualification
1	Iraq	2	2	0	0	7	0	+7	6	Final tournament
2	Bahrain (H)	2	1	0	1	3	3	0	3	
3	Maldives	2	0	0	2	0	7	−7	0	
4	Afghanistan (Note: Afghanistan withdrew from the tournament on 25 October 2021 as they were not able to reach Bahrain before the first match due to absence of timely flights from Kabul as per an official statement.)	0	0	0	0	0	0	0	0	Withdrew

Source: AFC
Rules for classification: Qualification tiebreakers
(H) Hosts
Notes:
25 October 2021
16:15

Iraq	4–0	Maldives
Abdulridha 10'; Sartip 35' (pen.); Ramadhan 57', 86'	Report

Al Muharraq Stadium, Arad
Attendance: 50
Referee: Salman Ahmad Falahi (Qatar)

28 October 2021
19:15

Maldives	0–3	Bahrain
	Report	Fawaz 16'; Qayoom 55'; Al-Asfoor 70' (pen.)

Al Muharraq Stadium, Arad
Attendance: 125
Referee: Shukri Al-Hunfush (Saudi Arabia)

31 October 2021
19:15

Iraq	3–0	Bahrain
Abdulkareem 19'; M. Mohammed 42'; Raad 90+3'	Report

Al Muharraq Stadium, Arad
Attendance: 200
Referee: Ahmed Al-Ali (Jordan)

=== Group D ===
- All matches were held in Uzbekistan.
- Times listed are UTC+5.
- Uzbekistan already qualified to the final tournament as host country, so their matches were not taken into account when calculating the group ranking.
- Originally Kuwait was supposed to host group D; however, the AFC changed host country due to the COVID-19 pandemic in the country. On 19 October 2021, Uzbekistan was named replacement host.

Pos	Team	Pld	W	D	L	GF	GA	GD	Pts	Qualification
1	Kuwait	2	2	0	0	3	1	+2	6	Final tournament
2	Saudi Arabia	2	1	0	1	4	2	+2	3	Final tournament
3	Bangladesh	2	0	0	2	0	4	−4	0	

Source: AFC
Rules for classification: Qualification tiebreakers
27 October 2021
15:00

Bangladesh	0–1	Kuwait
	Report	Ayedh 19'

JAR Stadium, Tashkent
Attendance: 20
Referee: Nasrullo Kabirov (Tajikistan)
27 October 2021
15:00

Uzbekistan	2–2	Saudi Arabia
Jurakuziyev 45'; Jaloliddinov 80' (pen.)	Report	Al-Ghamdi 40'; Al-Qahtani 47'

Pakhtakor Stadium, Tashkent
Attendance: 571
Referee: Yūsuke Araki (Japan)

30 October 2021
15:00

Kuwait	2–1	Saudi Arabia
Munshi 52' (o.g.); Ayedh 56'	Report	Al-Buraikan 26'

JAR Stadium, Tashkent
Attendance: 100
Referee: Omar Mohammed Al Ali (United Arab Emirates)
30 October 2021
15:00

Uzbekistan	6–0	Bangladesh
Khoshimov 13', 17'; Begimov 14'; Toshtemirov 26'; Fayzullayev 64'; Odilov 89'	Report

Pakhtakor Stadium, Tashkent
Attendance: 2,169
Referee: Mohammad Ghabayen (Jordan)

2 November 2021
15:00

Saudi Arabia	3–0	Bangladesh
Abdulhamid 16'; Al-Johani 19'; Yahya 70'	Report

Bunyodkor Stadium, Tashkent
Attendance: 100
Referee: Yusuke Araki (Japan)
2 November 2021
15:00

Kuwait	1–5	Uzbekistan
Naji 65'	Report	Rakhimkulov 37'; Erkinov 45+2', 90+4'; Jaloliddinov 51'; Khoshimov 68' (pen.)

Pakhtakor Stadium, Tashkent
Attendance: 213
Referee: Ammar Mahfoodh (Bahrain)

=== Group E ===
- All matches were held in the United Arab Emirates
- Times listed are UTC+4.

Pos	Team	Pld	W	D	L	GF	GA	GD	Pts	Qualification
1	United Arab Emirates (H)	3	2	0	1	4	2	+2	6	Final tournament
2	India	3	1	1	1	2	2	0	4 (Note: Penalty shoot-out: India 4–2 Kyrgyzstan)	
3	Kyrgyzstan	3	1	1	1	2	2	0	4	
4	Oman	3	1	0	2	2	4	−2	3	

Source: AFC
Rules for classification: Qualification tiebreakers
(H) Hosts
Notes:
24 October 2021
16:50

United Arab Emirates	1–2	Kyrgyzstan
Al-Balochi 45+2'	Report	Japarov 77'; Sharshenbekov 87'

Fujairah Stadium, Fujairah
Attendance: 100
Referee: Mongkolchai Pechsri (Thailand)
24 October 2021
20:30

Oman	1–2	India
Al-Musalmi 89'	Report	Ali 7' (pen.); V. Singh 38'

Fujairah Stadium, Fujairah
Attendance: 25
Referee: Alireza Faghani (Iran)

27 October 2021
16:50

Kyrgyzstan	0–1	Oman
	Report	Arshad 90+2'

Fujairah Stadium, Fujairah
Attendance: 0
Referee: Thoriq Alkatiri (Indonesia)
27 October 2021
20:30

India	0–1	United Arab Emirates
	Report	Idrees 82' (pen.)

Fujairah Stadium, Fujairah
Attendance: 100
Referee: Fu Ming (China)

30 October 2021
16:50

United Arab Emirates	2–0	Oman
Fahad 1'; Saleh 87'	Report

Fujairah Stadium, Fujairah
Attendance: 150
Referee: Mongkolchai Pechsri (Thailand)
30 October 2021
20:30

India	0–0	Kyrgyzstan
	Report
Penalties
Praveen (penalty scored); Danu (penalty scored); Wangjam (penalty scored); Rai (penalty missed); Ali (penalty scored)	4–2	(penalty missed) Artykbaev; (penalty missed) Artiukov; (penalty scored) Sharshenbekov; (penalty scored) Tashiev

Fujairah Stadium, Fujairah
Attendance: 100
Referee: Javiz Mohamed (Maldives)

=== Group F ===
- All matches were held in Jordan.
- Times listed are UTC+2.

Pos	Team	Pld	W	D	L	GF	GA	GD	Pts	Qualification
1	Jordan (H)	2	1	1	0	2	1	+1	4	Final tournament
2	Turkmenistan	2	1	0	1	3	2	+1	3	Final tournament
3	Palestine	2	0	1	1	2	4	−2	1	

Source: AFC
Rules for classification: Qualification tiebreakers
(H) Hosts
25 October 2021
19:00

Turkmenistan	0–1	Jordan
	Report	Olwan 67'

King Abdullah II Stadium, Amman
Attendance: 620
Referee: Yu Ming-hsun (Chinese Taipei)

28 October 2021
19:00

Palestine	1–3	Turkmenistan
Mousa 47'	Report	Hydyrow 18', 64'; Ballakow 88'

King Abdullah II Stadium, Amman
Attendance: 73
Referee: Muhammad Taqi (Singapore)

31 October 2021
19:00

Jordan	1–1	Palestine
Al-Naimat 48'	Report	Mohammed 77'

King Abdullah II Stadium, Amman
Attendance: 850
Referee: Bijan Heidari (Iran)

=== Group G ===
- Both matches were held in Tajikistan.
- Times listed are UTC+5.
- After the withdrawal of Brunei and China PR, the remaining teams left played each other twice. The winner qualified for the final tournament, with the loser eliminated.

Pos	Team	Pld	W	D	L	GF	GA	GD	Pts	Qualification
1	Australia	2	2	0	0	4	2	+2	6	Final tournament
2	Indonesia	2	0	0	2	2	4	−2	0	
3	China (Note: China PR withdrew from the competition on October 11 due to COVID-19 pandemic.)	0	0	0	0	0	0	0	0	Withdrew
4	Brunei (Note: Brunei withdrew from the competition on September 3.)	0	0	0	0	0	0	0	0	Withdrew

Source: AFC
Rules for classification: Qualification tiebreakers
Notes:
26 October 2021
17:00

Indonesia	2–3	Australia
Witan 68'; Taufik 84'	Report	Tokich 53'; Wood 59'; Italiano 77'

Central Republican Stadium, Dushanbe
Attendance: 0
Referee: Kim Woo-sung (South Korea)

29 October 2021
17:00

Australia	1–0	Indonesia
Wood 10'	Report

Central Republican Stadium, Dushanbe
Attendance: 0
Referee: Khalid Al-Turais (Saudi Arabia)

=== Group H ===
- All matches were held in Singapore.
- Times listed are UTC+8.

Pos	Team	Pld	W	D	L	GF	GA	GD	Pts	Qualification
1	South Korea	3	3	0	0	14	1	+13	9	Final tournament
2	Singapore (H)	3	1	1	1	4	7	−3	4	
3	Timor-Leste	3	1	1	1	3	8	−5	4	
4	Philippines	3	0	0	3	0	5	−5	0	

Source: AFC
Rules for classification: Qualification tiebreakers
(H) Hosts
25 October 2021
17:00

South Korea	3–0	Philippines
Lee Kyu-hyuk 51'; Go Jae-hyun 72'; Park Jeong-in 89'	Report

Jalan Besar Stadium, Singapore
Attendance: 400
Referee: Yudai Yamamoto (Japan)
25 October 2021
20:00

Singapore	2–2	Timor-Leste
Kweh 34'; Emaviwe 90+5'	Report	Elias 39'; Gali 42'

Jalan Besar Stadium, Singapore
Attendance: 553
Referee: Majed Al Shamrani (Saudi Arabia)

28 October 2021
17:00

Timor-Leste	0–6	South Korea
	Report	Park Jeong-in 29', 32', 49'; Choi Jun 32'; Oh Hyun-gyu 82'; Kim Se-yun 87'

Jalan Besar Stadium, Singapore
Attendance: 166
Referee: Ngô Duy Lân (Vietnam)
28 October 2021
20:00

Philippines	0–1	Singapore
	Report	Kweh 52'

Jalan Besar Stadium, Singapore
Attendance: 984
Referee: Zaid Thamer (Iraq)

31 October 2021
17:00

Timor-Leste	1–0	Philippines
Zenivio 89'	Report

Jalan Besar Stadium, Singapore
Attendance: 251
Referee: Yudai Yamamoto (Japan)
31 October 2021
20:30

South Korea	5–1	Singapore
Kim Chan 3'; Cho Sang-jun 6'; Mahler 25' (o.g.); Park Jeong-in 40'; Choi Jun 52'	Report	Adam 57'

Jalan Besar Stadium, Singapore
Attendance: 993
Referee: Hussein Abo Yehia (Lebanon)

=== Group I ===
- All matches were to be held in Taiwan (Chinese Taipei), but AFC determined that the host would be changed, with Kyrgyzstan as the new host.
- Times listed are UTC+6.

Pos	Team	Pld	W	D	L	GF	GA	GD	Pts	Qualification
1	Vietnam	2	2	0	0	2	0	+2	6	Final tournament
2	Myanmar	2	1	0	1	1	1	0	3	
3	Chinese Taipei	2	0	0	2	0	2	−2	0	

Source: AFC
Rules for classification: Qualification tiebreakers
27 October 2021
16:00

Chinese Taipei	0–1	Vietnam
	Report	Lê Văn Xuân 82'

Dolen Omurzakov Stadium, Bishkek
Attendance: 0
Referee: Chae Sang-hyeop (South Korea)

30 October 2021
16:00

Myanmar	1–0	Chinese Taipei
Kaung Myat Thu 80'	Report

Dolen Omurzakov Stadium, Bishkek
Attendance: 0
Referee: Sayyodjon Zayniddinov (Tajikistan)

2 November 2021
16:00

Vietnam	1–0	Myanmar
Hồ Thanh Minh 60'	Report

Dolen Omurzakov Stadium, Bishkek
Attendance: 0
Referee: Nazmi Nasaruddin (Malaysia)

=== Group J ===
- All matches were held in Mongolia.
- Time listed are UTC+8.

Pos	Team	Pld	W	D	L	GF	GA	GD	Pts	Qualification
1	Malaysia	3	2	1	0	2	0	+2	7	Final tournament
2	Thailand	3	1	2	0	4	1	+3	5	Final tournament
3	Laos	3	1	0	2	3	6	−3	3	
4	Mongolia (H)	3	0	1	2	3	5	−2	1	

Source: AFC
Rules for classification: Qualification tiebreakers
(H) Hosts
25 October 2021
11:00

Thailand	1–1	Mongolia
Jakkit 11'	Report	Batbold 76'

MFF Football Centre, Ulaanbaatar
Attendance: 312
Referee: Yoshimi Yamashita (Japan)
25 October 2021
15:00

Malaysia	1–0	Laos
Azfar 68'	Report

MFF Football Centre, Ulaanbaatar
Attendance: 75
Referee: Sadullo Gulmurodi (Tajikistan)

28 October 2021
11:00

Mongolia	0–1	Malaysia
	Report	Azfar 40'

MFF Football Centre, Ulaanbaatar
Attendance: 482
Referee: Syedvahid Kazemi (Iran)
28 October 2021
15:00

Laos	0–3	Thailand
	Report	Thanawat 41' (pen.); Jakkit 58'; Korawich 90+2'

MFF Football Centre, Ulaanbaatar
Attendance: 128
Referee: Akhrol Riskullayev (Uzbekistan)

31 October 2021
11:00

Thailand	0–0	Malaysia
	Report

MFF Football Centre, Ulaanbaatar
Attendance: 58
Referee: Sadullo Gulmurodi (Tajikistan)
31 October 2021
15:00

Laos	3–2	Mongolia
Bounkong 6' (pen.), 74'; Gerelt-Od 46' (o.g.)	Report	Sangvilay 22' (o.g.); Oyuntuya 23'

MFF Football Centre, Ulaanbaatar
Attendance: 803
Referee: Yahya Al-Mulla (United Arab Emirates)

=== Group K ===
- All matches were held in Japan.
- Times listed are UTC+9.
- DPR Korea withdrew from the competition on 29 July. They were replaced by a team initially drawn in Group G–J (excluding host countries and teams from Pot 1), which was determined by a draw on 11 August to be Hong Kong.

Pos	Team	Pld	W	D	L	GF	GA	GD	Pts	Qualification
1	Japan (H)	2	2	0	0	8	0	+8	6	Final tournament
2	Cambodia	2	1	0	1	4	6	−2	3	
3	Hong Kong	2	0	0	2	2	8	−6	0	
4	North Korea	0	0	0	0	0	0	0	0	Withdrew

Source: AFC
Rules for classification: Qualification tiebreakers
(H) Hosts
23 October 2021
13:00

Cambodia	4–2	Hong Kong
Chanthea 40', 54'; Pisoth 56'; Ratanak 62'	Report	Lam 82', 90+3' (pen.)

J-Village Stadium, Hirono
Attendance: 0
Referee: Payam Heydari (Iran)

26 October 2021
13:00

Japan	4–0	Cambodia
Matsuki 10'; Koda 44'; Hosoya 52'; Nakamura 73'	Report

J-Village Stadium, Hirono
Attendance: 0
Referee: Shaun Evans (Australia)

28 October 2021
13:00

Hong Kong	0–4	Japan
	Report	Fuijo 14', 49'; Goke 63'; Hosoya 85'

J-Village Stadium, Hirono
Attendance: 0
Referee: Bold Khash-Erdene (Mongolia)

=== Ranking of second-placed teams ===
Due to groups having different numbers of teams, the results against the fourth-placed teams in four-team groups were not considered for this ranking.

Exceptions:

- In Group D, the results against the host country Uzbekistan were not considered.
- In Group G, the runners-up results were not considered for this ranking, as the group contained only two teams.

Pos	Grp	Team	Pld	W	D	L	GF	GA	GD	Pts	Qualification
1	J	Thailand	2	1	1	0	3	0	+3	4	Final tournament
2	D	Saudi Arabia	2	1	0	1	4	2	+2	3	Final tournament
3	F	Turkmenistan	2	1	0	1	3	2	+1	3	Final tournament
4	B	Tajikistan	2	1	0	1	3	3	0	3 (Note: Disciplinary points: Tajikistan –1, Bahrain –2.)	Final tournament
5	C	Bahrain	2	1	0	1	3	3	0	3	
6	I	Myanmar	2	1	0	1	1	1	0	3	
7	K	Cambodia	2	1	0	1	4	6	−2	3	
8	A	Syria	2	0	2	0	1	1	0	2	
9	E	India	2	0	1	1	0	1	−1	1	
10	H	Singapore	2	0	1	1	3	7	−4	1	

Source: AFC

== Goalscorers ==
There were 114 individuals who scored at least 1 goal.

There were 146 goals scored in 50 matches, for an average of 2.92 goals per match.

5 goals

- (South Korea) Park Jeong-in

4 goals

- (Iran) Yasin Salmani
- (Qatar) Hashim Ali

3 goals

- (Uzbekistan) Ulugbek Khoshimov

2 goals

- (Australia) Patrick Wood
- (Cambodia) Sieng Chanthea
- (Hong Kong) Jordan Lam
- (Iran) Mehdi Limouchi
- (Iran) Hossein Nokhodkar
- (Iraq) Wakaa Ramadhan
- (Japan) Shota Fujio
- (Japan) Mao Hosoya
- (Kuwait) Yousef Ayedh
- (Laos) Bounphachan Bounkong
- (Lebanon) Zein Farran
- (Malaysia) Azfar Fikri
- (Singapore) Glenn Kweh
- (South Korea) Choi Jun
- (Syria) Ali Bashmani
- (Tajikistan) Vahdat Hanonov
- (Thailand) Jakkit Palapon
- (Turkmenistan) Şamämmet Hydyrow
- (Uzbekistan) Khojimat Erkinov
- (Uzbekistan) Jasurbek Jaloliddinov

1 goal

- (Australia) Jacob Italiano
- (Australia) Marc Tokich
- (Bahrain) Abbas Al-Asfoor
- (Bahrain) Adnan Fawaz
- (Bahrain) Mohammed Abdul Qayoom
- (Cambodia) Lim Pisoth
- (Cambodia) Min Ratanak
- (India) Rahim Ali
- (India) Vikram Pratap Singh
- (Indonesia) Taufik Hidayat
- (Indonesia) Witan Sulaeman
- (Iran) Milad Kor
- (Iraq) Hasan Abdulkareem
- (Iraq) Moamel Abdulridha
- (Iraq) Muntadher Mohammed
- (Iraq) Sohaib Raad
- (Iraq) Ahmed Sartip
- (Japan) Yuta Goke
- (Japan) Hidemasa Koda
- (Japan) Kuryu Matsuki
- (Japan) Jiro Nakamura
- (Jordan) Yazan Al-Naimat
- (Jordan) Ali Olwan
- (Kuwait) Abdulaziz Naji
- (Kyrgyzstan) Amir Japarov
- (Kyrgyzstan) Arlen Sharshenbekov
- (Lebanon) Mohamad Haidar
- (Lebanon) Mohamad Nasser
- (Mongolia) Baljinnyam Batbold
- (Mongolia) Oyunbold Oyuntuya
- (Myanmar) Kaung Myat Thu
- (Oman) Arshad Al-Alawi
- (Oman) Waleed Al-Musalmi
- (Palestine) Wajdi Mohammed
- (Palestine) Bader Mousa
- (Qatar) Yusuf Abdurisag
- (Qatar) Naif Al-Hadhrami
- (Qatar) Khaled Mohammed
- (Qatar) Ahmed Suhail
- (Qatar) Mohammed Waad
- (Saudi Arabia) Saud Abdulhamid
- (Saudi Arabia) Firas Al-Buraikan
- (Saudi Arabia) Hamed Al-Ghamdi
- (Saudi Arabia) Ziyad Al-Johani
- (Saudi Arabia) Abdulmohsen Al-Qahtani
- (Saudi Arabia) Ayman Yahya
- (Singapore) Nur Adam Abdullah
- (Singapore) Jordan Emaviwe
- (South Korea) Cho Sang-jun
- (South Korea) Go Jae-hyun
- (South Korea) Kim Chan
- (South Korea) Kim Se-yun
- (South Korea) Lee Kyu-hyuk
- (South Korea) Oh Hyun-gyu
- (Syria) Mohammad Al-Hallak
- (Syria) Mohammad Malta
- (Tajikistan) Muhammadali Azizboev
- (Tajikistan) Ahmadkhon Emomali
- (Tajikistan) Shervoni Mabatshoev
- (Tajikistan) Ehson Panjshanbe
- (Tajikistan) Rustam Soirov
- (Tajikistan) Sharafdzhon Solehov
- (Tajikistan) Islom Zoirov
- (Thailand) Thanawat Suengchitthawon
- (Thailand) Korawich Tasa
- (Timor-Leste) Elias
- (Timor-Leste) Paulo Gali
- (Timor-Leste) Zenivio
- (Turkmenistan) Welmyrat Ballakow
- (United Arab Emirates) Khalid Al-Balochi
- (United Arab Emirates) Marwan Fahad
- (United Arab Emirates) Abdulla Idrees
- (United Arab Emirates) Ali Saleh
- (Uzbekistan) Eldorbek Begimov
- (Uzbekistan) Abbosbek Fayzullayev
- (Uzbekistan) Otabek Jurakuziyev
- (Uzbekistan) Alisher Odilov
- (Uzbekistan) Diyorbek Rakhimkulov
- (Uzbekistan) Asliddin Toshtemirov
- (Vietnam) Hồ Thanh Minh
- (Vietnam) Lê Văn Xuân
- (Yemen) Omar Al-Dahi
- (Yemen) Nasser Al-Gahwashi
- (Yemen) Emad Al-Godaimah

1 own goal

- (Laos) Phoutthavong Sangvilay (against Mongolia)
- (Mongolia) Bat-Orgil Gerelt-Od (against Laos)
- (Qatar) Yusuf Abdurisag (against Syria)
- (Saudi Arabia) Bader Munshi (against Kuwait)
- (Singapore) Jacob Mahler (against South Korea)
- (Sri Lanka) Abdul Basith (against Syria)

Source: AFC

== Qualified teams ==
The following teams qualified for the 2022 AFC U-23 Asian Cup.

Team	Qualified as	Qualified on	Previous qualifications
Uzbekistan	Hosts	18 March 2021	4 (2013, 2016, **2018**, 2020)
Qatar	Group A winners	31 October 2021	3 (2016, 2018, 2020)
Iran	Group B winners	31 October 2021	3 (2013, 2016, 2020)
Iraq	Group C winners	31 October 2021	4 (**2013**, 2016, 2018, 2020)
Kuwait	Group D winners	30 October 2021	1 (2013)
United Arab Emirates	Group E winners	30 October 2021	3 (2013, 2016, 2020)
Jordan	Group F winners	31 October 2021	4 (2013, 2016, 2018, 2020)
Australia	Group G winners	29 October 2021	4 (2013, 2016, 2018, 2020)
South Korea	Group H winners	31 October 2021	4 (2013, 2016, 2018, **2020**)
Vietnam	Group I winners	2 November 2021	3 (2016, 2018, 2020)
Malaysia	Group J winners	31 October 2021	1 (2018)
Japan	Group K winners	28 October 2021	4 (2013, **2016**, 2018, 2020)
Thailand	1st best runners-up	31 October 2021	3 (2016, 2018, 2020)
Saudi Arabia	2nd best runners-up	2 November 2021	4 (2013, 2016, 2018, 2020)
Turkmenistan	3rd best runners-up	31 October 2021	0 (Debut)
Tajikistan	4th best runners-up	2 November 2021	0 (Debut)

^{1} Bold indicates champions for that year. Italic indicates hosts for that year.

== See also ==
- 2022 AFC Women's Asian Cup qualification
