= Mongolia national under-23 football team =

Mongolia Under-23
- Nickname: The Blue Wolves
- Association: MFF
- Confederation: AFC (Asia)
- Sub-confederation: EAFF (East Asia)
- Head coach: Arthur Ferreira
First colours	Second colours

The Mongolia national under-23 football team is a youth football team operated under the auspices of Mongolian Football Federation. Its primary role is qualification into and competition at the quadriennial Olympic Football Tournament. Ichiro Otsuka is the team's current head coach.

== Coaching staff ==
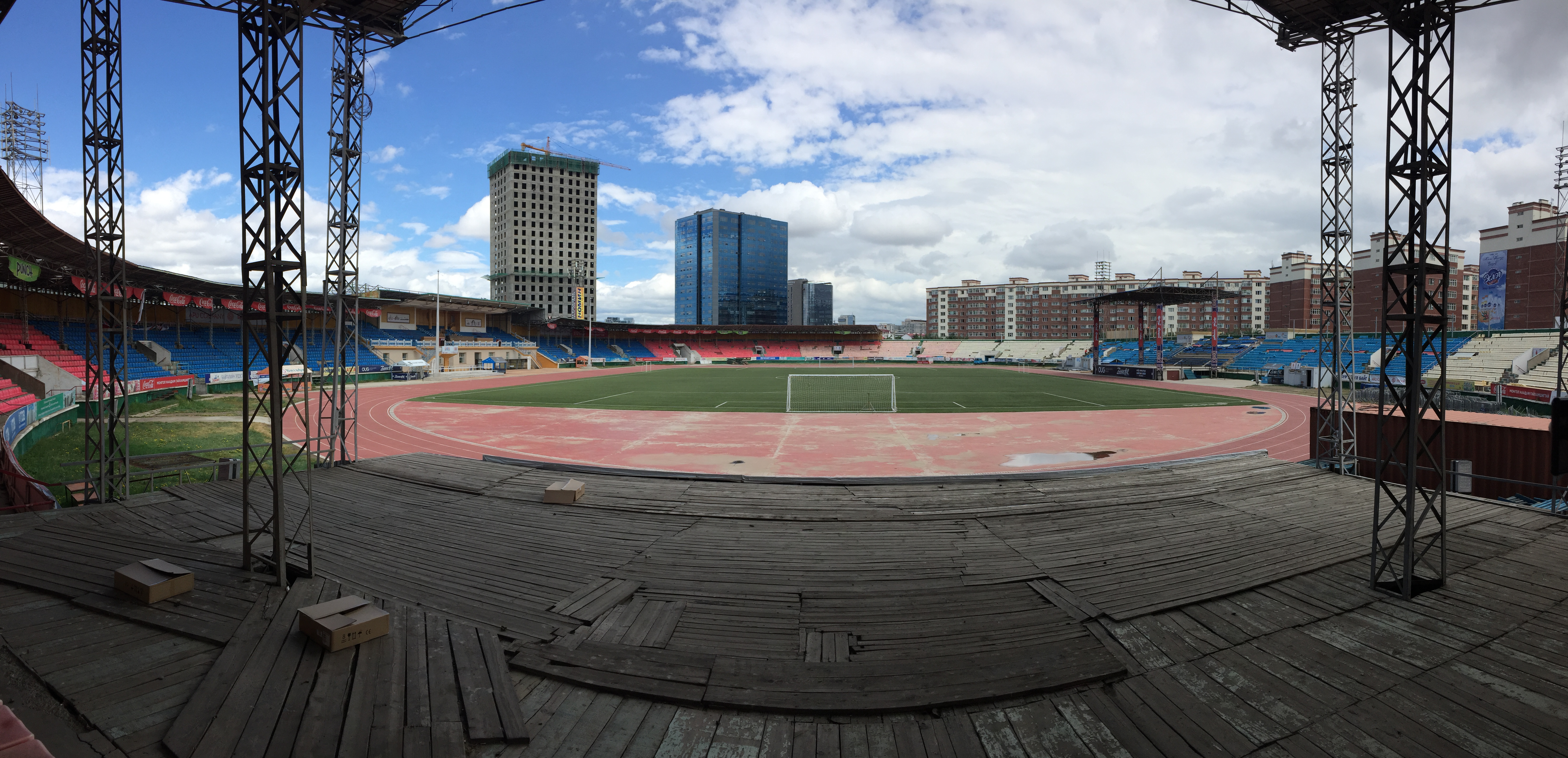
The National Sports Stadium was Mongolia's home stadium until the MFF Football Centre was constructed.

As of September 2021

Position	Name
Team Manager	(Mongolia) Badruul Batbaya
Head coach	(Brazil) Arthur Ferreira
Assistant coach	(Brazil) Bruno Velo (Mongolia) Enkhjin Tsagaantsooj
Goalkeeper coach	(Mongolia) Delgerdalai Gantumur
Team Doctor	(Mongolia) Samatyn Bakhtiyar
Physiotherapist	(Mongolia) Khürelbaataryn Tsakhia
Media Officer	(Mongolia) Mönkh-Erdeniin Khaltmaa

== Managers ==
Name	Nat	Period	Matches	Wins	Draws	Losses	Competitions
Dovdon Batnasan	(Mongolia)	2016	3	0	1	2	2016 AFC U-23 Championship qualification
Michael Weiß	(Germany)	2017–2020	3	0	1	2	2018 AFC U-23 Championship qualification
Ichiro Otsuka	(Japan)	2018–2024	3	0	1	2	2022 AFC U-23 Asian Cup qualification 2024 AFC U-23 Asian Cup qualification
Bayasgalangiin Garidmagnai	(Mongolia)	2024–2025					
Arthur Ferreira	(Brazil)	2025–present	3	0	0	3	2026 AFC U-23 Asian Cup qualification

== Players ==
=== Current squad ===
The following 23 players were called up for the 2022 Asian Games.

No.	Pos.	Player	Date of birth (age)	Club
1	GK	Sereekhua Batmagni	24 July 2002 (age 24)	(Mongolian Football Federation) Deren
21	GK	Ariunbold Batsaikhan*	3 April 1990 (age 36)	(Mongolian Football Federation) Khangarid
22	GK	Enkh-Erdene Gan-Erdene	12 August 2003 (age 23)	(Mongolian Football Federation) Khoromkhon
2	DF	Khashchuluun Naranbaatar	5 August 2004 (age 22)	(Mongolian Football Federation) Deren
3	DF	Bayartsengel Purevdorj*	26 January 1997 (age 29)	(Mongolian Football Federation) Khangarid
4	DF	Ganbat Dulguun	27 October 2004 (age 22)	(Mongolian Football Federation) Deren
7	DF	Dölgöön Amaraa	20 February 2001 (age 25)	(Mongolian Football Federation) Deren
12	DF	Mönkh-Orgil Orkhon	30 January 1999 (age 27)	(Mongolian Football Federation) Deren
13	DF	Oyuntuya Oyunbold	11 November 2001 (age 25)	(Football Association of Hong Kong, China) Sham Shui Po
18	DF	Tumen-Ulzii Sodbilguun	18 July 2005 (age 21)	(Mongolian Football Federation) BCH Lions
20	DF	Gochoo Bilguun	14 October 2000 (age 26)	(Mongolian Football Federation) Khaan Khuns-Erchim
23	DF	Enkhbold Erkhembayar	17 August 2002 (age 24)	(Mongolian Football Federation) Deren
5	MF	Gan-Erdene Erdenebat	24 August 2005 (age 21)	(Mongolian Football Federation) Deren
6	MF	Tserenbat Baasanjav	31 December 1999 (age 26)	(Mongolian Football Federation) Deren
8	MF	Baljinnyam Batmönkh	10 December 1999 (age 26)	(Mongolian Football Federation) Deren
10	MF	Tsend-Ayuush Khürelbaatar*	22 February 1990 (age 36)	(Mongolian Football Federation) Tuv Buganuud
15	MF	Togoo Munkhbaatar	20 November 1999 (age 26)	(Mongolian Football Federation) Khoromkhon
16	MF	Ganbat Buyannemekh	13 June 2003 (age 23)	(Mongolian Football Federation) Kharaatsai
17	MF	Tsogtbayar Batbayar	8 July 2001 (age 25)	(Austrian Football Association) Rebenland Leutschach
9	FW	Temulen Uuganbat	7 May 2005 (age 21)	(Mongolian Football Federation) Bayanzürkh Sporting Ilch
11	FW	Ankhbayar Sodmunkh	7 August 2004 (age 22)	(Mongolian Football Federation) Bayanzürkh Sporting Ilch
14	FW	Zayat Temuulen	10 December 2003 (age 22)	(Mongolian Football Federation) Khangarid
19	FW	Nergui Sainbuyan		(Mongolian Football Federation) Kharaatsai

^{*} Over-aged player.

=== Recent call ups ===
Pos.	Player	Date of birth (age)	Caps	Goals	Club	Latest call-up
DF	Filip Andersen Chinzorig	13 March 2003 (age 23)	-	-	(Malaysia) Negeri Sembilan	2024 AFC U-23 Asian Cup qualification
DF	Bat-Orgil Gerelt-Od	23 January 2002 (age 24)	-	-	(Mongolia) Ulaanbaatar	2024 AFC U-23 Asian Cup qualification

== Competitive history ==
=== AFC U-23 Championship ===
AFC U-22/U-23 Championship Record
Hosts / Year	Result	Position	GP	W	D	L	GS	GA
(Oman) 2013	Did not enter							
(Qatar) 2016	Did not qualify	Qualifying	3	0	1	2	2	14
(China) 2018	Did not qualify	Qualifying	3	0	1	2	1	10
(Thailand) 2020	Did not qualify	Qualifying	3	0	0	3	1	5
(Uzbekistan) 2022	Did not qualify	Qualifying	3	1	2	3	0	5
(Qatar) 2024	Did not qualify	Qualifying	3	0	1	2	3	6
(Saudi Arabia) 2026	Did not qualify	Qualifying	3	0	0	3	0	16
(Japan) 2028	To be determined							
Total	0/8	Qualifying	15	1	5	12	7	40

AFC U-22/U-23 Championship history
Year	Round	Score	Result	Scorer(s)
2016	Qualifying	Mongolia 0–5 China	Loss	
2016	Qualifying	Mongolia 0–7 Laos	Loss	
2016	Qualifying	Mongolia 2–2 Singapore	Draw	M. Tsogtbaatar, P. Erdenebat
2018	Qualifying	Mongolia 1–1 Thailand	Draw	T. Munkh-Erdene
2018	Qualifying	Mongolia 0–7 Indonesia	Loss	
2018	Qualifying	Mongolia 0–2 Malaysia	Loss	
2020	Qualifying	Mongolia 0–1 North Korea	Loss	
2020	Qualifying	Mongolia 0–1 Hong Kong	Loss	
2020	Qualifying	Mongolia 1–3 Singapore	Loss	B. Khash-Erdene
2022	Qualifying	Mongolia 1–1 Thailand	Draw	B. Batbold
2022	Qualifying	Mongolia 0–1 Malaysia	Loss	
2022	Qualifying	Mongolia 2–3 Laos	Loss	O. Oyuntuya
2024	Qualifying	Mongolia 1–3 Saudi Arabia	Loss	B. Tsogtbayar
2024	Qualifying	Mongolia 1–2 Cambodia	Loss	B. Gerelt-Od
2024	Qualifying	Mongolia 1–1 Lebanon	Draw	A. Chinzorig
2026	Qualifying	Mongolia 0–6 Thailand	Loss	
2026	Qualifying	Mongolia 0–7 Malaysia	Loss	
2026	Qualifying	Mongolia 0-3Lebanon	Loss	

=== Olympic Games ===
Summer Olympic Games Record
Year	Result	Position	Pld	W	D	L	GF	GA
(Spain) 1992	Did not enter							
(United States) 1996	Did not enter							
(Australia) 2000	Did not enter							
(Greece) 2004	Did not enter							
(China) 2008	Did not enter							
(United Kingdom) 2012	Did not enter							
(Brazil) 2016	Did not qualify							
(Japan) 2020	Did not qualify							
(France) 2024
(United States) 2028
(Australia) 2032	to be determined							

=== Asian Games ===
Asian Games record
Year	Result	Position	Pld	W	T	L	GF	GA
Senior National Team
1951 – 1998	See Mongolia national football team							
Under-23 National Team
(South Korea) 2002	withdraw	-	0	0	0	0	0	0
(Qatar) 2006	withdraw	-	0	0	0	0	0	0
(China) 2010	withdraw	-	0	0	0	0	0	0
(South Korea) 2014	withdraw	-	0	0	0	0	0	0
(China) 2022	Group Stage	21/21	3	0	0	3	2	10
(Japan) 2026	withdraw	-	0	0	0	0	0	0
Total	1/1	-	3	0	0	3	2	10

== See also ==
- Mongolia women's national football team
