= Marc Tokich =

Australian soccer player

Personal information
- Date of birth: 12 May 1999 (age 27)
- Place of birth: Canberra, Australia
- Height: 1.86 m (6 ft 1 in)
- Position: Defensive midfielder

Team information
- Current team: Varberg
- Number: 23

Youth career
- Canberra Croatia
- 2014: FFA CoE

Senior career*
Years	Team	Apps	(Gls)
2015–2016	FFA CoE	16	(3)
2017–2019	Western Sydney Wanderers	7	(0)
2018	Western Sydney Wanderers NPL	10	(3)
2021–2022	Mjällby AIF	1	(0)
2022	Sölvesborgs GoIF	7	(4)
2022–2023	BSK Bijelo Brdo	26	(3)
2023	Skövde AIK	12	(2)
2024–	Varberg	38	(3)

International career^{‡}
2017	Australia U20	2	(0)
2021	Australia U23	5	(1)
- * Club domestic league appearances and goals as of 13 November 2025 ‡ National team caps and goals as of 1 November 2021

Marc Tokich (born 12 May 1999) is an Australian professional soccer player who plays as a defensive midfielder for Swedish side Varberg.

== Club career ==
On 23 January 2024, Tokich joined Swedish club Varberg.

== International goals ==
=== Australia U23 ===
No.	Date	Venue	Opponent	Score	Result	Competition
1.	26 October 2021	Central Republican Stadium, Dushanbe, Tajikistan	Indonesia	1–0	3–2	2022 AFC U-23 Asian Cup qualification
