= Sho Otsuka =

Japanese footballer

Personal information
- Date of birth: July 25, 1995 (age 31)
- Place of birth: Toyama, Japan
- Height: 1.71 m (5 ft 7 in)
- Position: Midfielder

Team information
- Current team: Tokyo United
- Number: 27

Youth career
- –2010: Toyama Kita FC
- 2011–2013: Toyama Daiichi High School

College career
Years	Team	Apps	(Gls)
2014–2017	Kwansei Gakuin University		

Senior career*
Years	Team	Apps	(Gls)
2018–2019	FC Ryukyu	1	(0)
2020–2021	Ipswich Knights	11	(5)
2021–	Tokyo United	14	(0)
- * Club domestic league appearances and goals as of 23 September 2020

Sho Otsuka (大塚 翔, Otsuka Sho; born July 25, 1995) is a Japanese football player. He is the son of former footballer and manager Ichiro Otsuka.

== Club career ==
Otsuka was born in Toyama Prefecture on July 25, 1995. After graduating from Kwansei Gakuin University, he joined J3 League club FC Ryukyu in 2018.

== Personal life ==
His father, Ichiro Otsuka is a manager and currently managing the Mongolia national team.
