= Jakkit Palapon =

Thai footballer

Personal information
- Full name: Jakkit Palapon
- Date of birth: 1 July 1999 (age 27)
- Place of birth: Yasothon, Thailand
- Height: 1.75 m (5 ft 9 in)
- Position: Winger

Youth career
- 2014–2017: Ranong United

Senior career*
Years	Team	Apps	(Gls)
2018–2020	Ranong United	53	(8)
2021–2025	Khon Kaen United	95	(8)
2025–	Mahasarakham SBT	1	(1)

International career
2021–2022	Thailand U23	8	(2)
Medal record
Thailand under-23
SEA Games
Silver medal – second place	Vietnam 2021	Team
- * Club domestic league appearances and goals as of 8 October 2024

Jakkit Palapon (Thai: จักรกริช พาละพล, born 1 July 1999) is a Thai professional footballer who plays as a winger.

== International career ==
In October 2021, Jakkit was called up to the Thailand U-23 national team for the 2022 AFC U-23 Asian Cup qualification phase. He also played at the final tournament.

== Honours ==
=== International ===
Thailand U-23

- Southeast Asian Games (silver) Silver Medal: 2021
