= Kim Chan (footballer) =

South Korean footballer (born 2000)

Personal information
- Date of birth: 25 April 2000 (age 26)
- Place of birth: Pohang, South Korea
- Height: 1.89 m (6 ft 2 in)
- Position: Forward

Team information
- Current team: Busan IPark
- Number: 9

Youth career
- –2019: Pohang Steelers

Senior career*
Years	Team	Apps	(Gls)
2019–2021	Pohang Steelers	0	(0)
2019	→ Daejeon Hana Citizen (loan)	7	(1)
2020–2021	→ Chungnam Asan (loan)	50	(2)
2022–	Busan IPark	68	(15)
2024–2025	→ Gimcheon Sangmu FC (army)	7	(1)

International career^{‡}
2015	South Korea U14	4	(1)
2016	South Korea U17	2	(0)
2018	South Korea U20	1	(0)
- * Club domestic league appearances and goals as of 5 August 2026 ‡ National team caps and goals as of 14:18, 5 March 2020 (UTC)

- Kim Chan
- Hangul: 김찬
- RR: Gim Chan
- MR: Kim Ch'an

Kim Chan (Korean: 김찬; born 25 April 2000) is a South Korean footballer currently playing as a forward for Busan IPark.

== Career statistics ==
=== Club ===
As of 12 December 2023.

Club	Season	League			Cup		Play-offs		Total	
Club	Season	Division	Apps	Goals	Apps	Goals	Apps	Goals	Apps	Goals
Pohang Steelers	2019	K League 1	0	0	0	0	0	0	0	0
Pohang Steelers	2020	K League 1	0	0	0	0	0	0	0	0
Pohang Steelers	2021	K League 1	0	0	0	0	0	0	0	0
Pohang Steelers	Total		0	0	0	0	0	0	0	0
Daejeon Hana Citizen (loan)	2019	K League 2	7	1	0	0	0	0	7	1
Chungnam Asan (loan)	2020	K League 2	25	1	0	0	0	0	25	1
Chungnam Asan (loan)	2021	K League 2	25	1	1	1	0	0	26	2
Busan IPark	2022	K League 2	25	2	1	0	0	0	26	2
Busan IPark	2023	K League 2	26	8	1	0	2	0	29	8
Career total			108	13	3	1	2	0	113	14
