= Bader Mousa =

Palestinian footballer (born 1999)

Personal information
- Full name: Bader Yousef Mohammed Mousa
- Date of birth: 11 April 1999 (age 27)
- Place of birth: Rafah, Palestine
- Height: 1.80 m (5 ft 11 in)
- Position: Forward

Team information
- Current team: Petrojet
- Number: 9

Senior career*
Years	Team	Apps	(Gls)
2017–2018	Khadamat Rafah		
2017–2018	→ Al Qadsia (loan)		
2018–2020	Khadamat Rafah		
2020–2024	El Entag El Harby	0	(0)
2021	→ Ghazl El Mahalla (loan)	11	(0)
2024–	Petrojet	50	(9)

International career^{‡}
2021–	Palestine U23	5	(2)
2021–	Palestine	14	(0)
- * Club domestic league appearances and goals as of 31 October 2026 ‡ National team caps and goals as of 14 November 2026

Bader Yousef Mohammed Mousa (Arabic: بدر يوسف محمد موسى; born 11 April 1999) is a Palestinian professional footballer who plays as a forward for Egyptian club Petrojet and the Palestine national team.

== Club career ==
On 1 December 2020, Mousa joined Egyptian Premier League club El Entag El Harby from Khadamat Rafah on a three-year contract. On 29 January 2021, Mousa was loaned out to Ghazl El Mahalla for the remainder of the season. He made his debut on 17 April, as a 70th-minute substitute in a 2–2 draw against Pyramids. Mousa's debut as a starter came on 14 May, in a 2–1 home defeat to Al Masry.

== International career ==
Mousa made his international debut for Palestine on 3 June 2021, coming on as a substitute in a 4–0 win against Singapore in the 2022 FIFA World Cup qualification.

== Career statistics ==
=== International ===
As of match played 3 June 2021

Appearances and goals by national team and year
National team	Year	Apps	Goals
Palestine	2021	1	0
Total		1	0
