= Oyuntuya Oyunbold =

Mongolian footballer (born 2001)

Personal information
- Full name: Oyuntuya Oyunbold; О. Оюунболд
- Date of birth: 11 November 2001 (age 25)
- Place of birth: Mongolia
- Height: 1.73 m (5 ft 8 in)
- Positions: Right back; midfielder

Senior career*
Years	Team	Apps	(Gls)
2019–2021	Mongoliin Temuulel		
2019–2020	→ SP Falcons (loan)		
2021–2022	SP Falcons		
2022–2024	Sham Shui Po	15	(0)
2023–2024	→ Wong Tai Sin (loan)	22	(4)
2025	Eastern District	2	(1)

International career^{‡}
2020	Mongolia U20	3	(2)
2022–2025	Mongolia U23	3	(1)
2022–	Mongolia	3	(0)
- * Club domestic league appearances and goals as of 30 June 2025 ‡ National team caps and goals as of 22:11, 27 September 2022 (UTC)

Oyuntuya Oyunbold (Mongolian: О.Оюунболд; born 11 November 2001) is a Mongolian professional footballer who plays as a right back.

== Club career ==
=== Futsal ===
As a youth Oyunbold played futsal for Mongoliin Temuulel FC. In 2020, he was the league's top scorer with seventy-three goals en route to winning the Best Male Player Award at the Mongolian Football Federation's annual Golden Ball Ceremony. His seventy-three goal total included a league-record twenty goals in a single match.

=== Football ===
In 2019, Oyunbold played for Mongoliin Temuulel in the National Amateur Cup. He was joint top-scorer in the competition with nine goals. Later that year, the club played in the inaugural Mongolia Second League season. Mongoliin Temuulel finished third in the table as Oyunbold was tied for second-best scorer in the league with seven goals.

In July following the 2019 season, he joined the academy of SP Falcons of the Mongolian Premier League on a one-year loan. In March 2021, halfway through the 2021 Premier League season, Oyunbold returned to SP Falcons and signed for the first team on a five-year deal. During his first partial top-flight season, he scored four goals and tallied four assists.

In September 2022, he left SP Falcons and joined Hong Kong Premier League club Sham Shui Po. By doing so, he became the first-ever Mongolian player to sign for a club in Hong Kong. He made his league debut for the club on 18 September 2022 as a second-half substitute against Kitchee. In June 2023, it was announced that Oyunbold was one of several players who had departed Sham Shui Po following the 2022–23 season. In total, he made eight HKPL appearances for the club.

Oyunbold joined Hong Kong First Division club Wing Tai Sin in September 2023. He made his league debut for the club on 15 October 2023 against Wing Yee in the club's opening match of the 2023–24 season. He went on to appear in the club's first four matches of the campaign.

== International career ==
Oyunbold was part of Mongolia's squad that competed in 2020 AFC U-19 Championship qualification. In the final match of the group stage, he scored two goals in a 4–3 victory over Guam. He was called up to the youth squad again in October 2021 as Mongolia hosted its group in 2022 AFC U-23 Asian Cup qualification. He scored in his nation's 2–3 loss to Laos to close out Mongolia's campaign.

He made his senior international debut on 23 March 2022 in a friendly against Laos. He went on to make his competitive debut on 14 June 2022 in a 2–0 2023 AFC Asian Cup qualification victory over Yemen.

== Career statistics ==
=== International ===
As of match played 14 June 2021

Mongolia
Year	Apps	Goals
2022	3	0
Total	3	0

=== Club ===
As of 22 January 2024

Club	Season	League			Cup		Continental		Total	
Club	Season	Division	Apps	Goals	Apps	Goals	Apps	Goals	Apps	Goals
Sham Shui Po	2022–23	Hong Kong Premier League	8	0	1	0	0	0	9	0
Wong Tai Sin	2023–24	Hong Kong First Division	11	2	0	0	0	0	11	2
Career total			19	2	1	0	0	0	20	2
