= Tsogtbayar Batbayar =

Mongolian footballer (born 2001)

Personal information
- Date of birth: 8 July 2001 (age 25)
- Place of birth: Ulaanbaatar, Mongolia
- Height: 1.82 m (6 ft 0 in)
- Position: Midfielder

Team information
- Current team: ASK Köflach
- Number: 27

Youth career
- –2015: GSV Wacker
- 2015–2016: LUV Graz
- 2016: GSV Wacker
- 2015–2016: LUV Graz
- 2016–2017: SV Thal
- 2017–2018: SC Kalsdorf

Senior career*
Years	Team	Apps	(Gls)
2018	SV Feldbach II		
2019–2020	SV Gössendorf		
2020–2021	SC Kalsdorf	1	(0)
2022	ASK Köflach	11	(0)
2023	Deren FC		
2023–2024	SU Rebenland		
2024–	ASK Köflach	10	(0)

International career^{‡}
2023	Mongolia U23	5	(0)
2023	Mongolia	4	(0)
- * Club domestic league appearances and goals as of 5 December 2024 ‡ National team caps and goals as of 5 November 2024

Tsogtbayar Batbayar (Mongolian: Батбаярын Цогтбаяр; born 8 July 2001) is a Mongolian footballer who plays as a midfielder for ASK Köflach.

== Club career ==
Batbayar started his senior career with the reserve team of Austrian side SV Feldbach in the summer of 2018, before signing for Austrian side SV Gössendorf six months later. Ahead of the 2020–21 season, he signed for Austrian side SC Kalsdorf. During early 2022, he signed for Austrian side ASK Köflach, where he made eleven Oberliga appearances and scored zero goals. One year later, he signed for Mongolian side Deren FC, where he was regarded as an important player for the club despite suffering an injury while playing for them.

== International career ==
Batbayar played for the Mongolia national under-23 football team for 2022 Asian Games and 2024 AFC U-23 Asian Cup qualification. The same year, he played for the Mongolia national football team for 2027 AFC Asian Cup qualification.

== Style of play ==
Batbayar plays as a midfielder or as a winger and is two-footed. Austrian website fan.at described him as a "technically strong winger".
