= Kim Se-yun =

Korean association football player

Personal information
- Date of birth: 29 April 1999 (age 27)
- Place of birth: Daegu, South Korea
- Height: 1.74 m (5 ft 9 in)
- Positions: Attacking midfielder; winger; full-back

Team information
- Current team: Gyeongnam FC
- Number: 70

Senior career*
Years	Team	Apps	(Gls)
2018–2021	Daejeon Hana Citizen	19	(0)
2022–	Gyeongnam FC		

International career^{‡}
2018	South Korea U19	1	(0)
2019–	South Korea U20	3	(0)
Medal record
Men's football
Representing South Korea
FIFA U-20 World Cup
Runner-up	2019 Poland
- * Club domestic league appearances and goals as of 18:13, 11 January 2022 (UTC) ‡ National team caps and goals as of 14:18, 26 May 2019 (UTC)

- Kim Se-yun
- Hangul: 김세윤
- RR: Gim Seyun
- MR: Kim Seyun

Kim Se-yun (Korean: 김세윤; born 29 April 1999) is a South Korean footballer currently playing as a forward for Gyeongnam FC.

== Career statistics ==
=== Club ===
As of 11 January 2022.

Club	Season	League			Cup		Other		Total	
Club	Season	Division	Apps	Goals	Apps	Goals	Apps	Goals	Apps	Goals
Daejeon Citizen	2018	K League 2	1	0	0	0	0	0	1	0
Daejeon Citizen	2019	K League 2	9	0	0	0	0	0	9	0
Daejeon Citizen	2020	K League 2	8	0	0	0	0	0	8	0
Daejeon Citizen	2021	K League 2	1	0	0	0	0	0	1	0
Gyeongnam FC	2022	K League 2	0	0	0	0	0	0	0	0
Career total			19	0	0	0	0	0	19	0

== Honours ==
=== International ===
==== South Korea U20 ====
- FIFA U-20 World Cup runner-up: 2019
