= Cho Sang-jun =

South Korean footballer (born 1999)

Personal information
- Date of birth: 11 July 1999 (age 27)
- Place of birth: Suwon, South Korea
- Height: 1.76 m (5 ft 9 in)
- Position: Forward

Team information
- Current team: Gyeongnam FC
- Number: 66

Youth career
- 2011: Seryu Elementary School
- 2012–2014: Suseong Middle School
- 2015: Suwon FC
- 2016–2017: Ansan Greeners
- 2018–2020: Jeju International University

Senior career*
Years	Team	Apps	(Gls)
2021	Suwon FC	26	(2)
2022	Seongnam FC	4	(0)
2023–2024	Gyeongnam FC	38	(2)
2025	Seoul E-Land FC	4	(0)
2026–	Gyeongnam FC	13	(4)

International career^{‡}
2021–	South Korea U23	3	(1)
- * Club domestic league appearances and goals as of 6 August 2026 ‡ National team caps and goals as of 14:18, 31 October 2021 (UTC)

- Cho Sang-jun
- Hangul: 조상준
- RR: Jo Sangjun
- MR: Cho Sangjun

Cho Sang-jun (Korean: 조상준; born 11 July 1999) is a South Korean professional footballer currently playing as a forward for Gyeongnam FC.

== Club career ==
On 20 January 2025, Sang-jun joined Seoul E-Land FC.

== Career statistics ==
=== Club ===
As of 20 February 2022.

Club	Season	League			Cup		Other		Total	
Club	Season	Division	Apps	Goals	Apps	Goals	Apps	Goals	Apps	Goals
Suwon FC	2021	K League 1	26	2	0	0	0	0	26	2
Seongnam FC	2022	K League 1	0	0	0	0	0	0	0	0
Career total			26	2	0	0	0	0	26	2
