= Khashchuluun Naranbaatar =

Mongolian footballer (born 2004)

Personal information
- Date of birth: 5 August 2004 (age 22)
- Place of birth: Ulaanbaatar, Mongolia
- Height: 1.80 m (5 ft 11 in)
- Position: Defender

Team information
- Current team: Deren
- Number: 33

Youth career
- –2021: Deren

Senior career*
Years	Team	Apps	(Gls)
2021–	Deren	46	(0)

International career^{‡}
2023–	Mongolia	6	(0)
2023	Mongolia U23	4	(0)
- * Club domestic league appearances and goals as of 11 August 2026 ‡ National team caps and goals as of 11 August 2026

Khashchuluun Naranbaatar (Mongolian: Наранбаатар Хашчулуун; born 5 August 2004) is a Mongolian footballer who plays as a defender for Mongolian Premier League club Deren and the Mongolia national team.

== Club career ==
Naranbaatar made his Mongolian Premier League debut for Deren in the 2021 season, where he made 13 appearances. In total, he has played 46 matches for Deren.

== International career ==
Naranbaatar was first called up to the Mongolia national team in 2022, and later made his debut on 25 March 2023, where he came on as a substitute in a 6–1 friendly defeat to Georgia. In September 2023, he represented the under-23 national team at the 2022 Asian Games.

== Personal life ==
Naranbaatar has two younger siblings. His grandparents were also athletes, with his grandfather playing table tennis, and his grandmother competing in track and field.
