= Muhammadali Azizboev =

Tajikistani professional football player

Personal information
- Full name: Muhammadali Azizboev
- Date of birth: 4 January 2003 (age 23)
- Place of birth: Istaravshan, Tajikistan
- Height: 1.83 m (6 ft 0 in)
- Position: Forward

Team information
- Current team: Ravshan Kulob
- Number: 7

Youth career
- -2021: Metallurg Bekabad

Senior career*
Years	Team	Apps	(Gls)
2021	Istaravshan	11	(0)
2022	Khujand	2	(0)
2022	Ravshan Kulob	8	(3)
2023	Khosilot Farkhor	20	(2)
2024	Istaravshan	18	(0)
2025	Parvoz Bobojon Ghafurov		
2026-	Ravshan Kulob	1	(0)

International career^{‡}
2023–	Tajikistan	2	(0)
- * Club domestic league appearances and goals as of 16 March 2026 ‡ National team caps and goals as of 06:55, 21 November 2023 (UTC)

Muhammadali Azizboev (Tajik: Мухаммадали Азизбоев, born 4 January 2003) is a Tajikistani professional football player for Ravshan Kulob and the Tajikistan national team.

== Career ==
=== International ===
Khamrokulov made his senior team debut on 14 June 2023 against Oman, coming on as a 93rd minute substitute for Manuchekhr Dzhalilov.

== Career statistics ==
=== International ===
As of match played 8 September 2023

National team	Year	Apps	Goals
Tajikistan	2023	2	0
Total		2	0

== Honours ==
=== International ===
==== Tajikistan ====
- Merdeka Tournament: 2023
