= Park Jeong-in =

South Korean footballer (born 2000)

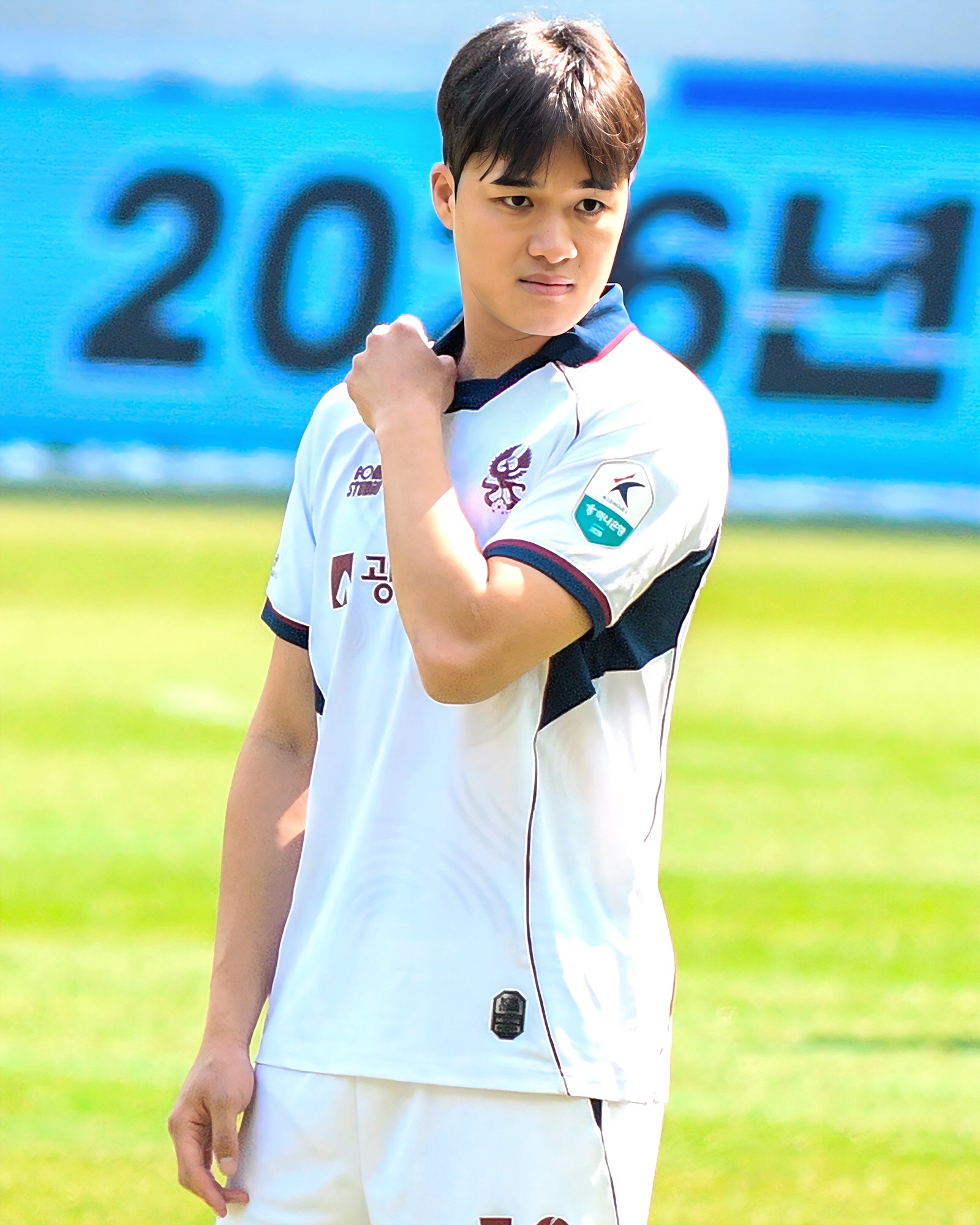
- Park in 2026

Personal information
- Full name: Park Jeong-in
- Date of birth: 7 October 2000 (age 26)
- Place of birth: South Korea
- Height: 1.78 m (5 ft 10 in)
- Position: Forward

Team information
- Current team: Bucheon
- Number: 9

Youth career
- 2013–2015: Hyundai Middle School (Youth)
- 2016–2018: Hyundai High School (Youth)

Senior career*
Years	Team	Apps	(Gls)
2019–2020	Ulsan Hyundai	13	(0)
2021-2023	Busan IPark	64	(16)
2023–2024	Seoul E-Land FC	30	(2)
2024	→ Daejeon Hana Citizen (loan)	6	(1)
2024	→ Daejeon Hana Citizen B (loan)	8	(4)
2025–2026	Gwangju FC	15	(0)
2026–	Bucheon	5	(0)

International career^{‡}
2015–2016	South Korea U17	11	(10)
2021–	South Korea U23	5	(5)
- * Club domestic league appearances and goals as of 4 August 2026 ‡ National team caps and goals as of 06:07, 5 June 2022 (UTC)

- Park Jeong-in
- Hangul: 박정인
- RR: Bak Jeongin
- MR: Pak Chŏngin

Park Jeong-in (Korean: 박정인; born 7 October 2000) is a South Korean football forward who plays for Bucheon.

== Club career ==
On 16 July 2023, he was traded with Kim Jeong-hwan from Busan IPark to Seoul E-Land FC.

In June 2024, he was loaned to Daejeon Hana Citizen.

In January 2025, Jeong-in joined Gwangju FC.

== Career statistics ==
As of 17 October 2022

Appearances and goals by club, season and competition
Club	Season	League			KFA Cup		Asia		Total	
Club	Season	Division	Apps	Goals	Apps	Goals	Apps	Goals	Apps	Goals
Ulsan Hyundai	2019	K League 1	6	0	0	0	1	0	7	0
Ulsan Hyundai	2020	K League 1	7	0	0	0	2	1	9	1
Ulsan Hyundai	Total		13	0	0	0	3	1	16	1
Busan IPark	2021	K League 2	29	8	1	0	—		30	8
Busan IPark	2022	K League 2	26	6	2	2	—		28	8
Busan IPark	Total		55	14	3	2	0	0	58	16
Career total			68	14	3	2	3	1	74	17
