= Ichiro Otsuka =

Japanese footballer and manager

Otsuka Ichiro
Personal information
- Date of birth: 3 November 1964 (age 61)
- Place of birth: Toyama, Toyama, Japan
- Position: Defender

Youth career
- 1980–1982: Toyama Daiichi High School

College career
Years	Team	Apps	(Gls)
1983–1986	Hosei University		

Senior career*
Years	Team	Apps	(Gls)
1987–1989	Furukawa SC		

Managerial career
- 1990–2002: Hokuriku Electric
- 2005–2006: Albirex Niigata (S)
- 2012–2021: Toyama Daiichi High School
- 2022–2024: Mongolia
- * Club domestic league appearances and goals

Ichiro Otsuka (大塚 一朗, Otsuka Ichiro; born 3 November 1964) is a Japanese former footballer and current manager.

== Managerial career ==
Otsuka served as head coach of Albirex Niigata Singapore between 2005 and 2006.

On 1 January 2022, Otsuka was appointed as Mongolia national football team head coach. He served until August 2024, with two wins in 16 matches.

== Personal life ==
Otsuka is the father of footballer Sho Otsuka.
