= Naif Al-Hadhrami =

Qatari footballer (born 2001)

Personal information
- Full name: Naif Abdulraheem Al-Hadhrami
- Date of birth: 18 July 2001 (age 25)
- Place of birth: Al-Rayyan, Qatar
- Height: 1.80 m (5 ft 11 in)
- Position: Midfielder

Team information
- Current team: Qatar (on loan from Al-Rayyan)
- Number: 44

Senior career*
Years	Team	Apps	(Gls)
2019–	Al-Rayyan	50	(2)
2024–2025	→ Al Shahaniya (loan)	12	(0)
2025–	→ Qatar (loan)	3	(0)

International career^{‡}
2021–2024	Qatar U23	14	(0)
2022–	Qatar	3	(0)
- * Club domestic league appearances and goals as of 28 September 2022 (UTC) ‡ National team caps and goals as of 11 June 2024 (UTC)

Naif Abdulraheem Al-Hadhrami (Arabic: نَايِف عَبْد الرَّحِيم الْحَضْرَمِيّ; born 18 July 2001) is a Qatari professional footballer who plays as a midfielder for Qatari club Qatar, on loan from Al-Rayyan and the Qatar national team.

Al-Hadhrami represented the Qatar national team in the 2022 FIFA World Cup that was hosted in his home country Qatar.
