= Tsend-Ayuush Khürelbaatar =

Mongolian footballer

Personal information
- Full name: Khürelbaataryn Tsend-Ayuush; Хүрэлбаатарын Цэнд-Аюуш
- Date of birth: 22 February 1990 (age 36)
- Place of birth: Ulaanbaatar, Mongolia
- Height: 1.78 m (5 ft 10 in)
- Position: Midfielder

Team information
- Current team: Brera Ilch
- Number: 10

Senior career*
Years	Team	Apps	(Gls)
2006–2017	Khoromkhon		
2017–2019	Deren		
2020–2021	SP Falcons		
2021–2024	Tuv Azarganuud		
2024–	Brera Ilch		

International career^{‡}
2007–	Mongolia	43	(1)
- * Club domestic league appearances and goals as of 16:30, 30 June 2011 (UTC) ‡ National team caps and goals as of 7 June 2024 (UTC)

Khürelbaataryn Tsend-Ayuush (Mongolian: Хүрэлбаатарын Цэнд-Аюуш; born 22 February 1990) is a Mongolian professional footballer who plays as a midfielder for Mongolian Premier League club Brera Ilch FC and the Mongolia national team. He is known for scoring the only goal of the match against Myanmar during the AFC section of 2014 FIFA World Cup qualifying on 29 June 2011 in Ulaanbaatar, Mongolia.

== Career statistics ==
=== International goals ===
#	Date	Venue	Opponent	Score	Result	Competition
1.	29 June 2011	MFF Football Centre, Ulan Bator, Mongolia	Myanmar	1–0	Win	2014 World Cup Q. AFC 1st Round
Correct as of 21 July 2013
