= 2026 AFC U-23 Asian Cup squads =

The 2026 AFC U-23 Asian Cup is an under-23 international football tournament organised by the Asian Football Confederation, held in Saudi Arabia from 6 to 27 January 2026. Sixteen national teams participated. Each team was required to register a final squad of 18 to 23 players, including at least three goalkeepers, with only registered players eligible to compete. Eligible players had to be born on or after 1 January 2003.

Teams were required to submit a preliminary list of 18 to 50 players, including at least four goalkeepers, via the AFC Administration System (AFCAS) no later than 30 days before their first match. Up to five players could be added or replaced on the preliminary list up to seven days before the first match, provided the maximum limit was not exceeded. Final squad lists of 18 to 23 players had to be submitted at least 10 days before the first match, and all selected players had to be drawn from the preliminary list.

The AFC published the final squad lists, including squad numbers, on 4 January 2026. After submission, teams were permitted to replace players up to six hours before their first match, with replacements limited to players from the preliminary list.

Player ages are listed as of 6 January 2026, the opening day of the tournament. Players shown in bold were capped at senior international level prior to the start of the tournament.

== Group A ==
=== Jordan ===
Jordan announced their final squad on 23 December 2025. On 7 January 2025, Ali Azaizeh replaced Ahmad Al-Moghrabi due to a back injury.

Head coach: (Morocco) Omar Najhi

| No. | Pos. | Player | Date of birth (age) | Club |
|---|---|---|---|---|
| 1 | GK | Murad Al-Faluji | 27 December 2003 (aged 22) | (Jordan Football Association) Al-Hussein |
| 2 | DF | Ja'far Samara | 8 June 2004 (aged 21) | (Jordan Football Association) Al-Ramtha |
| 3 | DF | **Ali Hajabi** | 2 May 2004 (aged 21) | (Jordan Football Association) Al-Hussein |
| 4 | DF | Arafat Al-Haj | 17 April 2003 (aged 22) | (Jordan Football Association) Al-Wehdat |
| 5 | DF | Ahmad Ayman | 24 November 2004 (aged 21) | (Jordan Football Association) Shabab Al-Ordon |
| 6 | MF | Yousef Qashi | 15 April 2005 (aged 20) | (Jordan Football Association) Al-Hussein |
| 7 | FW | **Amin Al-Shanaineh** | 7 April 2003 (aged 22) | (Jordan Football Association) Al-Faisaly |
| 8 | MF | Hashem Al-Mubaidin | 24 December 2003 (aged 22) | (Jordan Football Association) Al-Hussein |
| 9 | FW | Baker Kalbouneh | 14 August 2003 (aged 22) | (Jordan Football Association) Al-Wehdat |
| 10 | FW | **Odeh Al-Fakhouri** | 22 November 2005 (aged 20) | (Jordan Football Association) Al-Hussein |
| 11 | FW | Mahmoud Deeb | 8 September 2005 (aged 20) | (Jordan Football Association) Al-Hussein |
| 12 | GK | Salameh Salman | 7 May 2005 (aged 20) | (Jordan Football Association) Shabab Al-Ordon |
| 13 | DF | Mohammad Abu Ghoush | 13 July 2005 (aged 20) | (Jordan Football Association) Shabab Al-Ordon |
| 14 | DF | Mohammad Al-Shatti | 30 November 2006 (aged 19) | (Jordan Football Association) Al-Ahli |
| 15 | MF | Saleh Fraij | 3 November 2006 (aged 19) | (Jordan Football Association) Etihad |
| 16 | MF | Saif Suleiman | 22 September 2004 (aged 21) | (Jordan Football Association) Shabab Al-Ordon |
| 17 | FW | Khaldoon Sabra | 5 July 2004 (aged 21) | (Jordan Football Association) Al-Hussein |
| 18 | DF | Ayham Al-Samamreh | 9 May 2006 (aged 19) | (Jordan Football Association) Al-Wehdat |
| 19 | FW | Moamen Al-Saket | 8 July 2005 (aged 20) | (Jordan Football Association) Al-Ramtha |
| 20 | FW | Anas Al-Khob | 1 February 2006 (aged 19) | (Jordan Football Association) Al-Faisaly |
| 21 | DF | Abdallah Al-Mnayyes | 17 June 2005 (aged 20) | (Jordan Football Association) Al-Ramtha |
| 22 | GK | Abdel Rahman Al-Talalga | 12 April 2003 (aged 22) | (Jordan Football Association) Al-Faisaly |
| 23 | FW | Ali Azaizeh (captain) | 13 April 2004 (aged 21) | (Kuwait Football Association) Kazma |

=== Kyrgyzstan ===
Kyrgyzstan announced 25-men preliminary squad on 22 December 2025. The final squad was announced by the AFC on 3 January 2026.

Head coach: (Ukraine) Edmar

| No. | Pos. | Player | Date of birth (age) | Club |
|---|---|---|---|---|
| 1 | GK | **Kurmanbek Nurlanbekov** | 1 April 2004 (aged 21) | (Kyrgyz Football Union) Dordoi Bishkek |
| 2 | DF | **Khristiyan Brauzman** | 15 August 2003 (aged 22) | (Kyrgyz Football Union) Abdysh-Ata |
| 3 | DF | Anton Polev | 9 June 2003 (aged 22) | (Kyrgyz Football Union) Talant |
| 4 | DF | **Said Datsiev** (captain) | 10 April 2003 (aged 22) | (Kyrgyz Football Union) Bars |
| 5 | DF | Baibol Ermekov | 8 September 2005 (aged 20) | (Kyrgyz Football Union) Alga Bishkek |
| 6 | MF | Bektur Kochkonbaev | 11 January 2003 (aged 22) | (Kyrgyz Football Union) Uzgen |
| 7 | FW | Emir-Khan Kydyrshaev | 29 April 2005 (aged 20) | (Kyrgyz Football Union) Muras United |
| 8 | MF | Mirlan Bekberdinov | 14 August 2003 (aged 22) | (Kyrgyz Football Union) Alga Bishkek |
| 9 | FW | Erbol Abduzhaparov | 29 October 2004 (aged 21) | (Kyrgyz Football Union) Abdysh-Ata |
| 10 | FW | Arsen Sharshenbekov | 16 March 2004 (aged 21) | (Kyrgyz Football Union) Asiagoal Bishkek |
| 11 | FW | **Beknaz Almazbekov** | 23 June 2005 (aged 20) | (Ukrainian Association of Football) Rukh Lviv |
| 12 | FW | Biymyrza Zhenishbekov | 4 September 2003 (aged 22) | (Kyrgyz Football Union) Abdysh-Ata |
| 13 | GK | Melis Tashtanov | 28 August 2003 (aged 22) | (Kyrgyz Football Union) Neftchi Kochkor-Ata |
| 14 | MF | Bakytbek Mirzalim uulu | 24 April 2003 (aged 22) | (Kyrgyz Football Union) OshSU-Aldier |
| 15 | MF | Aitenir Balbakov | 10 January 2005 (aged 20) | (Kyrgyz Football Union) Ilbirs Bishkek |
| 16 | GK | Aziret Ysmanaliev | 24 October 2005 (aged 20) | (Kyrgyz Football Union) Muras United |
| 17 | DF | Arslan Bekberdinov | 14 August 2003 (aged 22) | (Kyrgyz Football Union) Dordoi Bishkek |
| 18 | FW | **Nurbol Baktybekov** | 23 February 2004 (aged 21) | (Kyrgyz Football Union) Alga Bishkek |
| 19 | FW | Nursultan Toktonaliev | 13 January 2004 (aged 21) | (Kyrgyz Football Union) Muras United |
| 20 | FW | Marlen Murzakhmatov | 21 May 2003 (aged 22) | (Kyrgyz Football Union) Asiagoal Bishkek |
| 21 | MF | **Kimi Merk** | 6 July 2004 (aged 21) | Free agent |
| 22 | MF | Kuduret Iskandarbekov | 24 July 2004 (aged 21) | (Kyrgyz Football Union) Uzgen |
| 23 | FW | Yryskeldi Madanov | 22 February 2006 (aged 19) | (Kyrgyz Football Union) Bars |

=== Saudi Arabia ===
Saudi Arabia announced their final squad on 1 January 2026.

Head coach: (Italy) Luigi Di Biagio

| No. | Pos. | Player | Date of birth (age) | Caps | Goals | Club |
|---|---|---|---|---|---|---|
| 1 | GK | Turki Ba'al Jawsh | 24 November 2003 (aged 22) | 5 | 0 | (Saudi Arabian Football Federation) Al-Ettifaq |
| 2 | DF | Mohammed Abdulrahman | 14 January 2003 (aged 22) | 3 | 0 | (Saudi Arabian Football Federation) Al-Ahli |
| 3 | DF | Mohammed Al-Dossari | 31 March 2003 (aged 22) | 10 | 0 | (Saudi Arabian Football Federation) Al Raed |
| 4 | DF | Mohammed Barnawi | 7 August 2005 (aged 20) | 4 | 0 | (Saudi Arabian Football Federation) Al-Ittihad |
| 5 | DF | Khalid Asiri | 27 November 2004 (aged 21) | 4 | 0 | (Saudi Arabian Football Federation) Diriyah |
| 6 | MF | Faisal Al-Subiani | 7 July 2003 (aged 22) | 2 | 0 | (Saudi Arabian Football Federation) Al Shabab |
| 7 | MF | Abdulaziz Al-Aliwa | 11 February 2004 (aged 21) | 6 | 0 | (Saudi Arabian Football Federation) Al-Kholood |
| 8 | MF | Faris Al-Ghamdi | 5 July 2003 (aged 22) | 0 | 0 | (Saudi Arabian Football Federation) Al-Ettifaq |
| 9 | FW | **Abdullah Radif** | 20 January 2003 (aged 22) | 20 | 12 | (Saudi Arabian Football Federation) Al Hilal |
| 10 | MF | **Musab Al-Juwayr** (captain) | 20 June 2003 (aged 22) | 0 | 0 | (Saudi Arabian Football Federation) Al Qadsiah |
| 11 | FW | Thamer Al-Khaibari | 3 December 2005 (aged 20) | 0 | 0 | (Saudi Arabian Football Federation) Neom |
| 12 | DF | Salem Al-Najdi | 27 January 2003 (aged 22) | 9 | 0 | (Saudi Arabian Football Federation) Al-Nassr |
| 13 | DF | **Sulaiman Hazazi** | 1 February 2003 (aged 22) | 0 | 0 | (Saudi Arabian Football Federation) Al-Riyadh |
| 14 | DF | Awad Dahal | 23 February 2005 (aged 20) | 0 | 0 | (Saudi Arabian Football Federation) Al-Ettifaq |
| 15 | MF | Bassam Hazzazi | 29 March 2005 (aged 20) | 0 | 0 | (Saudi Arabian Football Federation) Al-Nassr |
| 16 | MF | Yaseen Al-Zubaidi | 26 April 2003 (aged 22) | 0 | 0 | (Saudi Arabian Football Federation) Al-Ahli |
| 17 | FW | Abdulrahaman Sufyani | 15 April 2008 (aged 17) | 0 | 0 | (Saudi Arabian Football Federation) Al-Nassr |
| 18 | MF | Rakan Al-Ghamdi | 6 September 2005 (aged 20) | 4 | 0 | (Saudi Arabian Football Federation) Al-Nassr |
| 19 | FW | Majed Abdullah | 13 February 2006 (aged 19) | 2 | 0 | (Saudi Arabian Football Federation) Al Shabab |
| 20 | MF | **Hammam Al-Hammami** | 30 January 2004 (aged 21) | 0 | 0 | (Saudi Arabian Football Federation) Al Shabab |
| 21 | GK | Muhannad Al-Yahya | 19 September 2004 (aged 21) | 0 | 0 | (Saudi Arabian Football Federation) Al-Kholood |
| 22 | GK | Hamed Al-Shanqiti | 26 April 2005 (aged 20) | 5 | 0 | (Saudi Arabian Football Federation) Al-Ittihad |
| 23 | DF | Abdulrahman Al-Obaid | 2 July 2004 (aged 21) | 2 | 0 | (Saudi Arabian Football Federation) Al-Ittihad |

=== Vietnam ===
Vietnam announced their 25-men preliminary squad on 22 December 2025. On 26 December 2025, Đặng Tuấn Phong withdrew injured, shortening the preliminary list into 24 players. On 31 December 2025, Nguyễn Tân withdrew injured and was replaced by Phạm Đình Hải. On 4 January 2026, Bùi Vĩ Hào withdrew injured and was replaced by Nguyễn Lê Phát. The final squad was announced on 5 January 2026.

Head coach: (South Korea) Kim Sang-sik

| No. | Pos. | Player | Date of birth (age) | Caps | Goals | Club |
|---|---|---|---|---|---|---|
| 1 | GK | **Trần Trung Kiên** | 9 February 2003 (aged 22) | 13 | 0 | (Vietnam Football Federation) Hoang Anh Gia Lai |
| 2 | FW | Nguyễn Lê Phát | 12 January 2007 (aged 18) | 5 | 1 | (Vietnam Football Federation) Ninh Binh |
| 3 | DF | **Phạm Lý Đức** | 14 February 2003 (aged 22) | 14 | 1 | (Vietnam Football Federation) Cong An Hanoi |
| 4 | DF | **Nguyễn Hiểu Minh** | 5 August 2004 (aged 21) | 18 | 4 | (Vietnam Football Federation) PVF-CAND |
| 5 | DF | Nguyễn Đức Anh | 16 May 2003 (aged 22) | 10 | 0 | (Vietnam Football Federation) SHB Da Nang |
| 6 | MF | **Nguyễn Thái Sơn** | 13 July 2003 (aged 22) | 33 | 1 | (Vietnam Football Federation) Dong A Thanh Hoa |
| 7 | FW | **Nguyễn Đình Bắc** | 19 August 2004 (aged 21) | 24 | 6 | (Vietnam Football Federation) Cong An Hanoi |
| 8 | MF | Nguyễn Thái Quốc Cường | 6 March 2004 (aged 21) | 11 | 0 | (Vietnam Football Federation) Cong An HCMC |
| 9 | FW | Nguyễn Quốc Việt | 4 May 2003 (aged 22) | 39 | 8 | (Vietnam Football Federation) Ninh Binh |
| 10 | MF | Lê Văn Thuận | 15 July 2006 (aged 19) | 14 | 3 | (Vietnam Football Federation) Dong A Thanh Hoa |
| 11 | MF | **Khuất Văn Khang** (captain) | 11 May 2003 (aged 22) | 41 | 4 | (Vietnam Football Federation) Thể Công-Viettel |
| 12 | MF | Nguyễn Xuân Bắc | 3 February 2003 (aged 22) | 17 | 1 | (Vietnam Football Federation) PVF-CAND |
| 13 | GK | Phạm Đình Hải | 29 March 2006 (aged 19) | 0 | 0 | (Vietnam Football Federation) Hanoi FC |
| 14 | MF | Viktor Le | 10 November 2003 (aged 22) | 16 | 2 | (Vietnam Football Federation) Hong Linh Ha Tinh |
| 15 | DF | Lê Văn Hà | 1 July 2004 (aged 21) | 10 | 0 | (Vietnam Football Federation) Hanoi FC |
| 16 | DF | Nguyễn Nhật Minh | 27 July 2003 (aged 22) | 20 | 0 | (Vietnam Football Federation) Haiphong |
| 17 | MF | Nguyễn Phi Hoàng | 27 March 2003 (aged 22) | 23 | 0 | (Vietnam Football Federation) SHB Da Nang |
| 18 | MF | Nguyễn Công Phương | 3 June 2006 (aged 19) | 8 | 1 | (Vietnam Football Federation) Thể Công-Viettel |
| 19 | FW | Nguyễn Ngọc Mỹ | 20 February 2004 (aged 21) | 9 | 1 | (Vietnam Football Federation) Dong A Thanh Hoa |
| 20 | DF | Võ Anh Quân | 7 May 2004 (aged 21) | 15 | 0 | (Vietnam Football Federation) PVF-CAND |
| 21 | MF | Phạm Minh Phúc | 7 February 2004 (aged 21) | 12 | 2 | (Vietnam Football Federation) Cong An Hanoi |
| 22 | FW | **Nguyễn Thanh Nhàn** | 28 July 2003 (aged 22) | 28 | 5 | (Vietnam Football Federation) PVF-CAND |
| 23 | GK | Cao Văn Bình | 8 January 2005 (aged 20) | 10 | 0 | (Vietnam Football Federation) Song Lam Nghe An |

== Group B ==
=== Japan ===
Japan announced their final squad on 29 December 2025.

Head coach: Go Oiwa

| No. | Pos. | Player | Date of birth (age) | Club |
|---|---|---|---|---|
| 1 | GK | Masataka Kobayashi | 20 September 2005 (aged 20) | (Japan Football Association) FC Tokyo |
| 2 | DF | Rei Umeki | 25 August 2005 (aged 20) | (Japan Football Association) FC Imabari |
| 3 | DF | Kaito Tsuchiya | 12 May 2006 (aged 19) | (Japan Football Association) Kawasaki Frontale |
| 4 | DF | Shuto Nagano | 15 April 2006 (aged 19) | (Japan Football Association) Gainare Tottori |
| 5 | DF | Rion Ichihara | 7 July 2005 (aged 20) | (Japan Football Association) RB Omiya Ardija |
| 6 | MF | Kosei Ogura | 9 April 2005 (aged 20) | (Japan Football Association) Hosei University |
| 7 | MF | Nelson Ishiwatari | 10 May 2005 (aged 20) | (Japan Football Association) Cerezo Osaka |
| 8 | MF | **Yuto Ozeki** | 6 February 2005 (aged 20) | (Japan Football Association) Kawasaki Frontale |
| 9 | FW | Uche Brian Seo Nwadike | 7 July 2005 (aged 20) | (Japan Football Association) Toin University of Yokohama |
| 10 | MF | **Ryunosuke Sato** | 16 October 2006 (aged 19) | (Japan Football Association) FC Tokyo |
| 11 | FW | Yumeki Yokoyama | 23 September 2005 (aged 20) | (Japan Football Association) Cerezo Osaka |
| 12 | GK | Tomoyasu Hamasaki | 10 April 2005 (aged 20) | (Japan Football Association) Meiji University |
| 13 | FW | Sena Ishibashi | 22 April 2006 (aged 19) | (Japan Football Association) Shonan Bellmare |
| 14 | MF | Tokumo Kawai | 3 March 2007 (aged 18) | (Japan Football Association) Júbilo Iwata |
| 15 | DF | Soichiro Mori | 29 June 2007 (aged 18) | (Japan Football Association) Nagoya Grampus |
| 16 | DF | Kaito Koizumi | 19 April 2005 (aged 20) | (Japan Football Association) Meiji University |
| 17 | MF | Yudai Shimamoto | 26 October 2006 (aged 19) | (Japan Football Association) Shimizu S-Pulse |
| 18 | FW | Haruta Kume | 7 April 2005 (aged 20) | (Japan Football Association) Waseda University |
| 19 | FW | Yutaka Michiwaki | 5 April 2006 (aged 19) | (Royal Belgian Football Association) Beveren |
| 20 | MF | Shusuke Furuya | 26 January 2005 (aged 20) | (Japan Football Association) Tokyo International University |
| 21 | DF | Kanta Sekitomi | 23 October 2005 (aged 20) | (Japan Football Association) Toin University of Yokohama |
| 22 | DF | Tariqkani Hayato Okabe | 5 July 2006 (aged 19) | (Japan Football Association) Toyo University |
| 23 | GK | Rui Araki | 14 October 2007 (aged 18) | (Japan Football Association) Gamba Osaka |

=== Qatar ===
Qatar announced their final squad on 3 January 2026.

Head coach: (Portugal) Ilídio Vale

| No. | Pos. | Player | Date of birth (age) | Caps | Goals | Club |
|---|---|---|---|---|---|---|
| 1 | GK | Amir Hassan | 22 April 2004 (aged 21) | 4 | 0 | (Qatar Football Association) Al Duhail |
| 2 | DF | Abdalla Mugib | 12 December 2005 (aged 20) | 0 | 0 | (Royal Spanish Football Federation) Calahorra |
| 3 | DF | Saifeldeen Fadlalla | 31 March 2003 (aged 22) | 0 | 0 | (Qatar Football Association) Al-Gharafa |
| 4 | DF | **Al-Hashmi Al-Hussain** | 15 August 2003 (aged 22) | 8 | 0 | (Qatar Football Association) Al-Arabi |
| 5 | DF | Hassan Al-Ghareeb | 22 May 2004 (aged 21) | 1 | 0 | (Qatar Football Association) Lusail |
| 6 | MF | Abdulaziz Mohammed | 10 November 2003 (aged 22) | 4 | 0 | (Qatar Football Association) Al Shahaniya |
| 7 | FW | Mubarak Shanan | 20 February 2004 (aged 21) | 8 | 0 | (Qatar Football Association) Al Duhail |
| 8 | MF | Fares Said | 7 January 2003 (aged 22) | 7 | 0 | (Qatar Football Association) Umm Salal |
| 9 | FW | Rashid Al-Abdulla | 21 February 2004 (aged 21) | 1 | 1 | (Qatar Football Association) Al Duhail |
| 10 | MF | **Mahdi Salem** | 4 April 2004 (aged 21) | 7 | 0 | (Qatar Football Association) Al Sadd |
| 11 | FW | **Mohamed Khaled Gouda** | 26 January 2005 (aged 20) | 10 | 2 | (Qatar Football Association) Al-Arabi |
| 12 | DF | Marwan Sherif | 1 May 2006 (aged 19) | 0 | 0 | (Qatar Football Association) Al-Arabi |
| 13 | DF | Ayoub Al-Oui | 11 March 2005 (aged 20) | 0 | 0 | (Qatar Football Association) Al-Gharafa |
| 14 | MF | Ahmed Reyed | 28 September 2003 (aged 22) | 3 | 0 | (Qatar Football Association) Al Ahli |
| 15 | MF | Nabil Irfan | 7 February 2004 (aged 21) | 8 | 0 | (Qatar Football Association) Al-Wakrah |
| 16 | MF | Jassem Al-Sharshani | 2 January 2003 (aged 23) | 3 | 0 | (Qatar Football Association) Al Ahli |
| 17 | MF | Mostafa El-Sayed | 26 August 2004 (aged 21) | 2 | 1 | (Qatar Football Association) Al-Rayyan |
| 18 | MF | Moath Taha | 12 October 2005 (aged 20) | 0 | 0 | (Royal Spanish Football Federation) Calahorra |
| 19 | FW | **Tahsin Jamshid** | 16 June 2006 (aged 19) | 0 | 0 | (Qatar Football Association) Al Duhail |
| 20 | MF | Anas Abweny | 11 September 2004 (aged 21) | 9 | 0 | (Qatar Football Association) Al Shahaniya |
| 21 | GK | Abubaker Osman | 25 September 2005 (aged 20) | 0 | 0 | (Royal Spanish Football Federation) Calahorra |
| 22 | GK | Ali Ghulais | 17 May 2003 (aged 22) | 1 | 0 | (Qatar Football Association) Al-Shamal |
| 23 | FW | Mohamed Surag | 21 April 2003 (aged 22) | 1 | 0 | (Qatar Football Association) Al-Rayyan |

=== Syria ===
Syria announced their final squad on 3 January 2026.

Head coach: Jehad Al-Hussain

| No. | Pos. | Player | Date of birth (age) | Club |
|---|---|---|---|---|
| 1 | GK | Maksim Sarraf | 15 March 2004 (aged 21) | (Syrian Football Association) Al-Karamah |
| 2 | DF | Ahmad Faqa | 10 January 2003 (aged 22) | (Swedish Football Association) AIK |
| 3 | DF | Ousama Al Jiroudi | 26 August 2005 (aged 20) | (Syrian Football Association) Al-Wahda |
| 4 | DF | Khaled Al Hajja | 22 May 2004 (aged 21) | (Syrian Football Association) Al-Karamah |
| 5 | MF | Abdullah Zakreet | 3 January 2003 (aged 23) | (Syrian Football Association) Al-Karamah |
| 6 | MF | **Mustafa Abdullatif** | 15 December 2003 (aged 22) | (German Football Association) Hannover 96 |
| 7 | MF | Samir Al Mustafa | 1 March 2006 (aged 19) | (Syrian Football Association) Homs Al Fidaa |
| 8 | DF | Mahmoud Nayef | 3 January 2004 (aged 22) | (Syrian Football Association) Al-Karamah |
| 9 | FW | Muhannad Fadel | 4 January 2003 (aged 23) | (Syrian Football Association) Al-Karamah |
| 10 | MF | **Mahmoud Al Aswad** | 18 January 2003 (aged 22) | (Kuwait Football Association) Al-Salmiya |
| 11 | MF | Anas Dahhan | 31 January 2006 (aged 19) | (Syrian Football Association) Al Ittihad Ahli |
| 12 | MF | Aland Abdi | 5 May 2005 (aged 20) | (Royal Dutch Football Association) Roda JC |
| 13 | MF | Mahmoud Muhanna | 28 May 2003 (aged 22) | (Syrian Football Association) Homs Al Fidaa |
| 14 | DF | Al Mekdad Ahmad | 12 January 2004 (aged 21) | (Bahrain Football Association) Al-Hala |
| 15 | DF | Abdulrahman Al Arjah | 10 January 2006 (aged 19) | (Syrian Football Association) Al-Karamah |
| 16 | MF | **Hozan Osman** | 16 May 2003 (aged 22) | (Swiss Football Association) Paradiso |
| 17 | MF | Ayham Kranbeh | 14 January 2003 (aged 22) | (Syrian Football Association) Al-Jaish |
| 18 | MF | Mahmoud Al Omar | 15 January 2005 (aged 20) | (Syrian Football Association) Al Ittihad Ahli |
| 19 | FW | Mohammad Al Mustafa | 20 January 2005 (aged 20) | (Syrian Football Association) Al-Hurriya |
| 20 | FW | Mustafa Hamo | 1 January 2003 (aged 23) | (Syrian Football Association) Al-Wahda |
| 21 | MF | Mohamad Al Sarakbi | 20 January 2004 (aged 21) | (Syrian Football Association) Al-Karamah |
| 22 | GK | Modar Al Katib | 1 January 2004 (aged 22) | (Syrian Football Association) Tishreen |
| 23 | GK | Amr Sweidan | 1 April 2004 (aged 21) | (Syrian Football Association) Al-Karamah |

=== United Arab Emirates ===
United Arab Emirates announced their final squad on 3 January 2026.

Head coach: (Uruguay) Marcelo Broli

| No. | Pos. | Player | Date of birth (age) | Club |
|---|---|---|---|---|
| 1 | GK | Marzooq Al-Badwawi | 2 June 2004 (aged 21) | (United Arab Emirates Football Association) Hatta |
| 2 | DF | **Mubarak Zamah** | 29 November 2003 (aged 22) | (United Arab Emirates Football Association) Baniyas |
| 3 | DF | Leonard Ameshimeku | 25 November 2003 (aged 22) | (United Arab Emirates Football Association) Al Dhafra |
| 4 | DF | **Khamis Al-Mansoori** | 15 January 2004 (aged 21) | (United Arab Emirates Football Association) Baniyas |
| 5 | MF | Matar Zaal | 2 March 2004 (aged 21) | (United Arab Emirates Football Association) Sharjah |
| 6 | DF | Ahmed Malallah Yadoo | 20 November 2003 (aged 22) | (United Arab Emirates Football Association) Kalba |
| 7 | FW | Ali Al-Memari | 17 October 2004 (aged 21) | (United Arab Emirates Football Association) Al Jazira |
| 8 | MF | Ali Abdulaziz | 16 July 2003 (aged 22) | (United Arab Emirates Football Association) Al-Nasr |
| 9 | FW | Eisa Khalfan | 12 March 2003 (aged 22) | (United Arab Emirates Football Association) Kalba |
| 10 | FW | Mansoor Al-Menhali | 29 September 2003 (aged 22) | (United Arab Emirates Football Association) Baniyas |
| 11 | FW | Mohamed Khalil | 27 February 2003 (aged 22) | (United Arab Emirates Football Association) Emirates |
| 12 | DF | Hazaa Shehab | 31 July 2003 (aged 22) | (United Arab Emirates Football Association) Al Wahda |
| 13 | DF | Yousef Al-Marzouqi | 7 March 2005 (aged 20) | (United Arab Emirates Football Association) Al Jazira |
| 14 | MF | Solomon Sosu | 5 March 2005 (aged 20) | (United Arab Emirates Football Association) Al-Nasr |
| 15 | MF | Mohamed Al-Wafi | 1 July 2003 (aged 22) | (United Arab Emirates Football Association) Al Jazira |
| 16 | FW | Junior Ndiaye | 29 March 2005 (aged 20) | (French Football Federation) Montpellier |
| 17 | GK | Adli Mohamed | 13 July 2003 (aged 22) | (United Arab Emirates Football Association) Al-Nasr |
| 18 | DF | Mansour Burghash | 15 September 2004 (aged 21) | (United Arab Emirates Football Association) Al Wahda |
| 19 | FW | Mayed Al-Kass | 6 May 2003 (aged 22) | (United Arab Emirates Football Association) Sharjah |
| 20 | MF | Hazem Mohammad Abbas | 18 March 2005 (aged 20) | (United Arab Emirates Football Association) Al Ain |
| 21 | FW | Saif Al-Menhali | 1 February 2003 (aged 22) | (United Arab Emirates Football Association) Baniyas |
| 22 | GK | **Khaled Tawhid** | 16 February 2004 (aged 21) | (United Arab Emirates Football Association) Sharjah |
| 23 | DF | **Richard Akonnor** | 6 February 2004 (aged 21) | (United Arab Emirates Football Association) Al Jazira |

== Group C ==
=== Iran ===
Iran announced their final squad on 23 December 2025.

Head coach: Omid Ravankhah

| No. | Pos. | Player | Date of birth (age) | Club |
|---|---|---|---|---|
| 1 | GK | **Mohammad Khalifeh** | 19 August 2004 (aged 21) | (Football Federation Islamic Republic of Iran) Aluminium Arak |
| 2 | DF | Bahram Goudarzi | 15 November 2004 (aged 21) | (Football Federation Islamic Republic of Iran) Aluminium Arak |
| 3 | DF | Arshia Vosoughifard | 26 April 2004 (aged 21) | (Football Federation Islamic Republic of Iran) Fajr Sepasi |
| 4 | DF | **Danial Eiri** | 26 October 2003 (aged 22) | (Football Federation Islamic Republic of Iran) Malavan |
| 5 | DF | Mohammadmehdi Zare | 25 January 2003 (aged 22) | (Russian Football Union) Akhmat Grozny |
| 6 | MF | **Amir Mohammad Razzaghinia** | 11 April 2006 (aged 19) | (Football Federation Islamic Republic of Iran) Esteghlal |
| 7 | FW | Reza Ghandipour | 13 January 2006 (aged 19) | (United Arab Emirates Football Association) Al Wahda |
| 8 | MF | Pouria Latififar | 16 August 2003 (aged 22) | (Football Federation Islamic Republic of Iran) Gol Gohar |
| 9 | FW | Yadegar Rostami | 2 January 2004 (aged 22) | (Football Federation Islamic Republic of Iran) Fajr Sepasi |
| 10 | MF | **Mohammad Javad Hosseinnejad** (captain) | 26 June 2003 (aged 22) | (Russian Football Union) Dynamo Makhachkala |
| 11 | FW | Mohammad Askari | 7 February 2006 (aged 19) | (Football Federation Islamic Republic of Iran) Sepahan |
| 12 | GK | Pouria Rafiei | 24 February 2006 (aged 19) | (Football Federation Islamic Republic of Iran) Sepahan |
| 13 | DF | Seyed Mehdi Mahdavi | 30 September 2005 (aged 20) | (Football Federation Islamic Republic of Iran) Aluminium Arak |
| 14 | MF | Farhan Jafari | 2 December 2005 (aged 20) | (Football Federation Islamic Republic of Iran) Malavan |
| 15 | DF | Masoud Mohebi | 6 February 2006 (aged 19) | (Football Federation Islamic Republic of Iran) Kheybar |
| 16 | DF | Farzin Moamelehgari | 14 January 2003 (aged 23) | (Football Federation Islamic Republic of Iran) Shams Azar |
| 17 | DF | Erfan Jamshidi | 26 June 2003 (aged 22) | (Football Federation Islamic Republic of Iran) Paykan |
| 18 | MF | Amirreza Sheykhirad | 24 March 2005 (aged 20) | (Football Federation Islamic Republic of Iran) Nassaji |
| 19 | MF | Mahdi Goudarzi | 9 December 2003 (aged 22) | (Football Federation Islamic Republic of Iran) Kheybar |
| 20 | MF | Abbas Habibi | 25 March 2006 (aged 19) | (Football Federation Islamic Republic of Iran) Malavan |
| 21 | FW | Hamidreza Zarouni | 8 October 2005 (aged 20) | (Football Federation Islamic Republic of Iran) Kheybar |
| 22 | GK | Amirmehdi Maghsoudi | 16 October 2007 (aged 18) | (Football Federation Islamic Republic of Iran) Sepahan |
| 23 | FW | Mohammad Hossein Sadeghi | 20 February 2005 (aged 20) | (Football Federation Islamic Republic of Iran) Persepolis |

=== Lebanon ===
Lebanon announced their final squad on 1 January 2026.

Head coach: Jamal Taha

| No. | Pos. | Player | Date of birth (age) | Caps | Goals | Club |
|---|---|---|---|---|---|---|
| 1 | GK | Shareef Azaki | 13 January 2004 (aged 21) | 2 | 0 | (Lebanese Football Association) Ahed |
| 2 | DF | Ali Alrida Ismail | 8 July 2003 (aged 22) | 14 | 0 | (Lebanese Football Association) Nejmeh |
| 3 | DF | **Jad Smaira** | 9 November 2003 (aged 22) | 3 | 0 | (Cyprus Football Association) Achyronas-Onisilos |
| 4 | DF | **Hasan Farhat** | 21 September 2004 (aged 21) | 5 | 2 | (Lebanese Football Association) Jwaya |
| 5 | DF | **Mohamad Safwan** | 10 March 2003 (aged 22) | 4 | 0 | (Lebanese Football Association) Nejmeh |
| 6 | MF | Mohamad Ghamlouch | 19 May 2003 (aged 22) | 9 | 0 | (Lebanese Football Association) Tadamon Sour |
| 7 | MF | Mahmoud Zbib | 29 February 2004 (aged 21) | 5 | 1 | (Lebanese Football Association) Ahed |
| 8 | MF | Ali El Fadl | 29 March 2003 (aged 22) | 8 | 3 | (Lebanese Football Association) Nejmeh |
| 9 | FW | Hassan Bazzi | 6 November 2004 (aged 21) | 5 | 0 | (Lebanese Football Association) Tadamon Sour |
| 10 | FW | **Mohamad Sadek** | 25 October 2003 (aged 22) | 11 | 2 | (Lebanese Football Association) Nejmeh |
| 11 | FW | **Ali Kassas** | 25 May 2003 (aged 22) | 7 | 0 | (Lebanese Football Association) Nejmeh |
| 12 | DF | Josef El Hajj | 30 March 2005 (aged 20) | 3 | 0 | (German Football Association) SV Gonsenheim |
| 13 | DF | Hsein Reda | 7 April 2004 (aged 21) | 4 | 0 | (Lebanese Football Association) Ahed |
| 14 | MF | Hassan Fouani | 27 December 2004 (aged 21) | 3 | 0 | (Lebanese Football Association) Jwaya |
| 15 | DF | Ibrahim Chami | 12 December 2003 (aged 22) | 14 | 0 | (Lebanese Football Association) Jwaya |
| 16 | DF | **Khoder Kaddour** | 6 September 2003 (aged 22) | 0 | 0 | (Football Australia) South Melbourne |
| 17 | FW | Shadi Jouni | 31 January 2003 (aged 22) | 4 | 0 | (Lebanese Football Association) Ahed |
| 18 | MF | Daniel Istambouli | 12 August 2004 (aged 21) | 3 | 2 | (United States Soccer Federation) Sacred Heart Pioneers |
| 19 | FW | **Leonardo Shahin** | 10 August 2003 (aged 22) | 0 | 0 | (Swedish Football Association) IK Oddevold |
| 20 | FW | Nour Aoude | 2 August 2004 (aged 21) | 3 | 0 | (United States Soccer Federation) Oakland Golden Grizzlies |
| 21 | MF | Mohamad Bou Saleh | 19 March 2003 (aged 22) | 1 | 0 | (Lebanese Football Association) Ansar |
| 22 | GK | Zaher Al Amin | 15 May 2003 (aged 22) | 1 | 0 | (Lebanese Football Association) Riyadi Abbasiyah |
| 23 | GK | Anthony Maasry | 10 February 2004 (aged 21) | 5 | 0 | (French Football Federation) Villemomble |

=== South Korea ===
South Korea announced their final squad on 21 December 2025.

Head coach: Lee Min-sung

| No. | Pos. | Player | Date of birth (age) | Club |
|---|---|---|---|---|
| 1 | GK | Moon Hyeon-ho | 13 May 2003 (aged 22) | (Korea Football Association) Gimcheon Sangmu |
| 2 | DF | Kang Min-jun | 8 April 2003 (aged 22) | (Korea Football Association) Pohang Steelers |
| 3 | DF | Bae Hyun-seo | 16 February 2005 (aged 20) | (Korea Football Association) FC Seoul |
| 4 | DF | Jo Hyun-tae | 27 October 2004 (aged 21) | (Korea Football Association) Gangwon FC |
| 5 | DF | Lee Hyun-yong | 19 December 2003 (aged 22) | (Korea Football Association) Suwon FC |
| 6 | MF | Lee Chan-wook | 3 February 2003 (aged 22) | (Korea Football Association) Gimcheon Sangmu |
| 7 | FW | **Kang Seong-jin** | 26 March 2003 (aged 22) | (Korea Football Association) Suwon Samsung Bluewings |
| 8 | MF | Kim Dong-jin | 30 July 2003 (aged 22) | (Korea Football Association) Pohang Steelers |
| 9 | FW | Kim Tae-won | 11 March 2005 (aged 20) | (Portuguese Football Federation) Portimonense |
| 10 | MF | **Kang Sang-yoon** | 31 May 2004 (aged 21) | (Korea Football Association) Jeonbuk Hyundai Motors |
| 11 | MF | Jung Ji-hoon | 9 April 2004 (aged 21) | (Korea Football Association) Gwangju FC |
| 12 | GK | Hwang Jae-yoon | 18 March 2003 (aged 22) | (Korea Football Association) Suwon FC |
| 13 | DF | Kim Do-hyun | 12 May 2004 (aged 21) | (Korea Football Association) Gangwon FC |
| 14 | FW | Jung Seung-bae | 9 November 2003 (aged 22) | (Korea Football Association) Suwon FC |
| 15 | FW | Baek Ga-on | 23 January 2006 (aged 19) | (Korea Football Association) Busan I'Park |
| 16 | MF | Kim Han-seo | 14 February 2003 (aged 22) | (Korea Football Association) Yongin FC |
| 17 | MF | Kim Yong-hak | 20 May 2003 (aged 22) | (Portuguese Football Federation) Portimonense |
| 18 | FW | Jeong Jae-sang | 25 May 2004 (aged 21) | (Korea Football Association) Daegu FC |
| 19 | DF | Lee Geon-hee | 11 March 2005 (aged 20) | (Korea Football Association) Suwon Samsung Bluewings |
| 20 | DF | Park Jun-seo | 26 April 2004 (aged 21) | (Korea Football Association) Hwaseong FC |
| 21 | GK | Hong Sung-min | 29 September 2006 (aged 19) | (Korea Football Association) Pohang Steelers |
| 22 | DF | Jang Seok-hwan | 11 October 2004 (aged 21) | (Korea Football Association) Suwon Samsung Bluewings |
| 23 | DF | Shin Min-ha | 15 September 2005 (aged 20) | (Korea Football Association) Gangwon FC |

=== Uzbekistan ===
Uzbekistan announced their final squad on 1 January 2026.

Head coach: Ravshan Khaydarov

| No. | Pos. | Player | Date of birth (age) | Caps | Goals | Club |
|---|---|---|---|---|---|---|
| 1 | GK | **Maksim Murkaev** | 21 February 2005 (aged 20) | 1 | 0 | (Uzbekistan Football Association) Surkhon |
| 2 | DF | Saidkhon Khamidov | 20 January 2005 (aged 20) | 3 | 1 | (Uzbekistan Football Association) Olympic MobiUz |
| 3 | DF | Dilshod Murtazoev | 2 September 2006 (aged 19) | 2 | 0 | (Uzbekistan Football Association) Olympic MobiUz |
| 4 | DF | Givosjon Rizakulov | 20 February 2005 (aged 20) | 0 | 0 | (Uzbekistan Football Association) Olympic MobiUz |
| 5 | DF | Ozodbek Ergashov | 18 September 2006 (aged 19) | 1 | 0 | (Uzbekistan Football Association) Olympic MobiUz |
| 6 | MF | **Ravshan Khayrullaev** | 21 August 2005 (aged 20) | 5 | 0 | (Uzbekistan Football Association) Bukhara |
| 7 | MF | Sardor Bakhromov | 16 February 2005 (aged 20) | 3 | 1 | (Uzbekistan Football Association) Nasaf |
| 8 | MF | Mukhammedali Reimov | 26 June 2006 (aged 19) | 1 | 0 | (Uzbekistan Football Association) Olympic MobiUz |
| 9 | FW | **Saidumarkhon Saidnurullaev** | 13 April 2005 (aged 20) | 0 | 0 | (Uzbekistan Football Association) Pakhtakor |
| 10 | MF | **Rustambek Fomin** | 9 July 2005 (aged 20) | 0 | 0 | (Uzbekistan Football Association) Neftchi |
| 11 | MF | Asilbek Jumaev | 23 March 2005 (aged 20) | 9 | 0 | (Uzbekistan Football Association) Neftchi |
| 12 | GK | Umar Rustamov | 5 June 2005 (aged 20) | 2 | 0 | (Uzbekistan Football Association) Bunyodkor |
| 13 | DF | Islom Anvarov | 19 April 2006 (aged 19) | 1 | 0 | (Uzbekistan Football Association) Pakhtakor |
| 14 | DF | Azizbek Tulkunbekov | 10 February 2007 (aged 18) | 3 | 0 | (Uzbekistan Football Association) Bunyodkor |
| 15 | DF | Meyirbek Rejabaliev | 25 January 2005 (aged 20) | 3 | 0 | (Uzbekistan Football Association) Olympic MobiUz |
| 16 | DF | Bekhruz Karimov | 7 August 2007 (aged 18) | 3 | 0 | (Uzbekistan Football Association) Surkhon |
| 17 | FW | **Amirbek Saidov** | 1 February 2006 (aged 19) | 3 | 0 | (Uzbekistan Football Association) Bukhara |
| 18 | MF | Shokhzhakhon Yorkinboev | 20 January 2005 (aged 20) | 2 | 0 | (Uzbekistan Football Association) Andijon |
| 19 | DF | Mukhammadbobur Karimov | 13 March 2006 (aged 19) | 3 | 0 | (Uzbekistan Football Association) Pakhtakor |
| 20 | DF | Dilshod Abdullaev | 9 May 2006 (aged 19) | 3 | 0 | (Uzbekistan Football Association) Pakhtakor |
| 21 | GK | Samandar Muratbaev | 3 March 2005 (aged 20) | 0 | 0 | (Uzbekistan Football Association) Olympic MobiUz |
| 22 | MF | Nurlan Ibraimov | 29 August 2005 (aged 20) | 3 | 0 | (Uzbekistan Football Association) Olympic MobiUz |
| 23 | FW | Abdugafur Khaydarov | 16 February 2005 (aged 20) | 2 | 0 | (Uzbekistan Football Association) Kokand 1912 |

== Group D ==
=== Australia ===
Australia announced their final squad on 29 December 2025.

Head coach: Tony Vidmar

| No. | Pos. | Player | Date of birth (age) | Caps | Goals | Club |
|---|---|---|---|---|---|---|
| 1 | GK | Steven Hall | 16 January 2005 (aged 20) | 2 | 0 | (The Football Association) Brighton & Hove Albion |
| 2 | DF | Aidan Simmons | 26 May 2003 (aged 22) | 3 | 0 | (Football Australia) Western Sydney Wanderers |
| 3 | DF | Joshua Rawlins | 23 April 2004 (aged 21) | 10 | 2 | (Football Australia) Melbourne Victory |
| 4 | DF | Kane Vidmar | 4 June 2004 (aged 21) | 2 | 0 | (Football Australia) West Torrens Birkalla |
| 5 | DF | Giuseppe Bovalina | 11 November 2004 (aged 21) | 3 | 0 | (Canadian Soccer Association) Vancouver Whitecaps |
| 6 | DF | Kaelan Majekodunmi | 21 February 2004 (aged 21) | 0 | 0 | (Football Australia) Perth Glory |
| 7 | FW | Jed Drew | 29 August 2003 (aged 22) | 1 | 0 | (Austrian Football Association) TSV Hartberg |
| 8 | MF | Jordi Valadon | 4 March 2003 (aged 22) | 7 | 0 | (Football Australia) Melbourne Victory |
| 9 | FW | Nathanael Blair | 15 March 2004 (aged 21) | 4 | 5 | (Football Australia) Perth Glory |
| 10 | MF | Aydan Hammond | 23 December 2003 (aged 22) | 4 | 1 | (Football Australia) Western Sydney Wanderers |
| 11 | FW | Yaya Dukuly | 17 January 2003 (aged 22) | 3 | 3 | (Football Australia) Adelaide United |
| 12 | GK | Lachlan Allen | 4 April 2009 (aged 16) | 0 | 0 | (Football Australia) Western Sydney Wanderers |
| 13 | FW | Ariath Piol | 11 October 2004 (aged 21) | 0 | 0 | (Football Australia) Adelaide United |
| 14 | MF | Ethan Alagich | 18 December 2003 (aged 22) | 3 | 2 | (Football Australia) Adelaide United |
| 15 | DF | Nathan Paull | 21 August 2003 (aged 22) | 4 | 2 | (Football Australia) Central Coast Mariners |
| 16 | FW | Luka Jovanovic | 20 May 2005 (aged 20) | 0 | 0 | (Football Australia) Adelaide United |
| 17 | MF | Jaylan Pearman | 18 April 2006 (aged 19) | 0 | 0 | (The Football Association) Queens Park Rangers |
| 18 | GK | Dylan Peraić-Cullen | 25 July 2006 (aged 19) | 0 | 0 | (Football Australia) Central Coast Mariners |
| 19 | FW | Marcus Younis | 3 July 2005 (aged 20) | 0 | 0 | (Danish Football Association) Brøndby |
| 20 | MF | Louis Agosti | 2 March 2005 (aged 20) | 0 | 0 | (Italian Football Federation) Dolomiti Bellunesi |
| 21 | DF | James Overy | 9 November 2007 (aged 18) | 0 | 0 | (The Football Association) Manchester United |
| 22 | DF | Marcus Humbert | 4 December 2004 (aged 21) | 0 | 0 | (Football Australia) Heidelberg United |
| 23 | FW | Mathias Macallister | 12 April 2007 (aged 18) | 0 | 0 | (Football Australia) Sydney FC |

=== China ===
China announced their preliminary squad on 4 December 2025. The final squad was announced by the CFA on 7 January 2026.

Head coach: (Spain) Antonio Puche

| No. | Pos. | Player | Date of birth (age) | Club |
|---|---|---|---|---|
| 1 | GK | Luan Yi | 16 August 2005 (aged 20) | (Chinese Football Association) Shijiazhuang Gongfu |
| 2 | DF | **Hu Hetao** | 5 October 2003 (aged 22) | (Chinese Football Association) Chengdu Rongcheng |
| 3 | DF | He Yiran | 17 February 2005 (aged 20) | (Chinese Football Association) Changchun Yatai |
| 4 | DF | **Umidjan Yusup** | 28 February 2004 (aged 21) | (Chinese Football Association) Shanghai Port |
| 5 | DF | **Liu Haofan** | 23 October 2003 (aged 22) | (Chinese Football Association) Zhejiang |
| 6 | MF | Xu Bin | 2 May 2004 (aged 21) | (Chinese Football Association) Qingdao West Coast |
| 7 | FW | Xiang Yuwang | 18 December 2003 (aged 22) | (Chinese Football Association) Chongqing Tonglianglong |
| 8 | MF | Mutellip Iminqari | 18 March 2004 (aged 21) | (Chinese Football Association) Chengdu Rongcheng |
| 9 | FW | **Behram Abduweli** | 8 March 2003 (aged 22) | (Chinese Football Association) Shenzhen Peng City |
| 10 | FW | **Wang Yudong** | 23 November 2006 (aged 19) | (Chinese Football Association) Zhejiang |
| 11 | MF | **Kuai Jiwen** | 28 February 2006 (aged 19) | (Chinese Football Association) Shanghai Port |
| 12 | GK | Huo Shenping | 26 November 2003 (aged 22) | (Chinese Football Association) Zhejiang |
| 13 | MF | Wang Bohao | 18 July 2005 (aged 20) | (Royal Dutch Football Association) Den Bosch |
| 14 | MF | Yang Haoyu | 25 May 2006 (aged 19) | (Chinese Football Association) Shanghai Shenhua |
| 15 | DF | Peng Xiao | 28 July 2005 (aged 20) | (Chinese Football Association) Shandong Taishan |
| 16 | GK | Li Hao | 6 March 2004 (aged 21) | (Chinese Football Association) Qingdao West Coast |
| 17 | MF | Bao Shimeng | 2 July 2003 (aged 22) | (Chinese Football Association) Shanghai Port |
| 18 | MF | Chen Zeshi | 21 February 2005 (aged 20) | (Chinese Football Association) Shandong Taishan |
| 19 | DF | Zhang Aihui | 27 May 2005 (aged 20) | (Chinese Football Association) Zhejiang |
| 20 | MF | Li Zhenquan | 16 December 2003 (aged 22) | (Chinese Football Association) Chongqing Tonglianglong |
| 21 | MF | Bao Shengxin | 1 August 2003 (aged 22) | (Chinese Football Association) Zhejiang |
| 22 | MF | Mao Weijie | 25 May 2005 (aged 20) | (Chinese Football Association) Dalian Yingbo |
| 23 | DF | Alex Yang | 13 June 2005 (aged 20) | (Chinese Football Association) Qingdao West Coast |

=== Iraq ===
Iraq announced their final squad on 27 December 2025.

Head coach: Emad Mohammed

| No. | Pos. | Player | Date of birth (age) | Caps | Goals | Club |
|---|---|---|---|---|---|---|
| 1 | GK | Laith Sajid | 17 September 2005 (aged 20) | 1 | 0 | (Iraq Football Association) Al-Karma |
| 2 | DF | Hamid Ali | 25 September 2004 (aged 21) | 0 | 0 | (Iraq Football Association) Zakho |
| 3 | DF | Josef Al-Imam | 27 July 2004 (aged 21) | 19 | 0 | (Iraq Football Association) Duhok |
| 4 | DF | Adam Rasheed | 7 July 2006 (aged 19) | 4 | 0 | (Football Association of Slovenia) Maribor |
| 5 | MF | Abdul-Razzaq Qasim | 19 February 2003 (aged 22) | 3 | 0 | (Iraq Football Association) Al-Shorta |
| 6 | DF | Hussein Fahim | 6 April 2006 (aged 19) | 3 | 0 | (Iraq Football Association) Al-Karkh |
| 7 | MF | Jameel Shinaa | 25 November 2005 (aged 20) | 0 | 0 | (Iraq Football Association) Al-Fahad |
| 8 | FW | Yasir Wisam | 3 March 2007 (aged 18) | 0 | 0 | (Iraq Football Association) Al-Talaba |
| 9 | FW | Mustafa Qabeel | 8 January 2005 (aged 20) | 3 | 1 | (Iraq Football Association) Erbil |
| 10 | MF | Amoori Faisal | 1 May 2005 (aged 20) | 3 | 1 | (Iraq Football Association) Al-Karma |
| 11 | MF | Mustafa Nawaf | 5 May 2005 (aged 20) | 1 | 0 | (Iraq Football Association) Duhok |
| 12 | GK | Ridha Abdulaziz | 24 February 2003 (aged 22) | 10 | 0 | (Iraq Football Association) Newroz |
| 13 | MF | Abbas Fadhil | 13 July 2003 (aged 22) | 3 | 0 | (Iraq Football Association) Naft Maysan |
| 14 | FW | Jaber Dhumad | 5 May 2005 (aged 20) | 1 | 0 | (Iraq Football Association) Al-Nasiriya |
| 15 | DF | Ali Mokhalad | 7 February 2006 (aged 19) | 2 | 0 | (Iraq Football Association) Al-Karma |
| 16 | MF | Ahmed Ayed | 9 November 2003 (aged 22) | 3 | 2 | (Iraq Football Association) Al-Kahrabaa |
| 17 | DF | Karrar Ali | 21 September 2004 (aged 21) | 1 | 0 | (Iraq Football Association) Al-Qasim |
| 18 | MF | Ali Sadeq | 13 February 2003 (aged 22) | 3 | 1 | (Iraq Football Association) Al-Zawraa |
| 19 | MF | Sidad Haji | 1 January 2005 (aged 21) | 1 | 0 | (Iraq Football Association) Zakho |
| 20 | FW | Abbas Adnan | 1 January 2005 (aged 21) | 0 | 0 | (Iraq Football Association) Al-Kahrabaa |
| 21 | MF | Layth Dheyya | 7 June 2005 (aged 20) | 1 | 0 | (Iraq Football Association) Al-Quwa Al-Jawiya |
| 22 | GK | Wisam Ali | 27 May 2005 (aged 20) | 0 | 0 | (Iraq Football Association) Amanat Baghdad |
| 23 | FW | Ayman Luay | 23 May 2005 (aged 20) | 0 | 0 | (Iraq Football Association) Al-Gharraf |

=== Thailand ===
Thailand announced their final squad on 26 December 2025.

Head coach: Thawatchai Damrong-Ongtrakul

| No. | Pos. | Player | Date of birth (age) | Club |
|---|---|---|---|---|
| 1 | GK | Siraset Aekprathumchai | 8 April 2003 (aged 22) | (Football Association of Thailand) Chainat Hornbill |
| 2 | DF | Sphon Noiwong | 7 September 2005 (aged 20) | (Football Association of Thailand) Police Tero |
| 3 | DF | Pattarapon Suksakit | 19 August 2003 (aged 22) | (Football Association of Thailand) Sukhothai |
| 4 | DF | Oussama Thiangkham | 4 November 2003 (aged 22) | (Football Association of Thailand) PT Prachuap |
| 5 | DF | Nathan James | 28 September 2004 (aged 21) | (Football Association of Thailand) BG Pathum United |
| 6 | MF | Sittha Boonlha | 2 September 2004 (aged 21) | (Football Association of Thailand) Port |
| 7 | FW | Thanawut Phochai | 2 December 2005 (aged 20) | (Football Association of Thailand) Nongbua Pitchaya |
| 8 | MF | Chawanwit Saelao | 12 September 2004 (aged 21) | (Football Association of Thailand) Prime Bangkok |
| 9 | FW | Teerapat Pruetong | 17 February 2007 (aged 18) | (Football Association of Thailand) BG Pathum United |
| 10 | FW | Chinngoen Phutonyong | 15 August 2003 (aged 22) | (Football Association of Thailand) Chiangrai United |
| 11 | MF | Siraphop Wandee | 22 January 2004 (aged 21) | (Football Association of Thailand) Chonburi |
| 12 | DF | Parinya Nusong | 7 April 2004 (aged 21) | (Football Association of Singapore) Hougang United |
| 13 | DF | Wichan Inaram | 20 July 2007 (aged 18) | (Football Association of Thailand) Bangkok United |
| 14 | MF | Jittiphat Wasungnoen | 7 June 2004 (aged 21) | (Football Association of Thailand) PT Prachuap |
| 15 | DF | Pakawat Taengaksorn | 28 February 2005 (aged 20) | (Football Association of Thailand) Buriram United |
| 16 | DF | Pichitchai Sienkrathok | 18 March 2003 (aged 22) | (Football Association of Thailand) Nakhon Ratchasima |
| 17 | MF | Yotsakorn Natthasit | 29 May 2004 (aged 21) | (Football Association of Thailand) Khonkaen United |
| 18 | MF | Iklas Sanron | 16 December 2004 (aged 21) | (Football Association of Thailand) PT Prachuap |
| 19 | MF | Peeranan Buakhai | 17 June 2005 (aged 20) | (Football Association of Thailand) Nongbua Pitchaya |
| 20 | GK | Narongsak Naengwongsa | 19 February 2004 (aged 21) | (Football Association of Thailand) Ayutthaya United |
| 21 | DF | Phon-Ek Jensen | 30 May 2003 (aged 22) | (Football Association of Thailand) PT Prachuap |
| 22 | FW | Pariphan Wongsa | 19 March 2005 (aged 20) | (Football Association of Thailand) Buriram United |
| 23 | GK | Chommaphat Boonloet | 17 February 2003 (aged 22) | (Football Association of Thailand) Pattaya United |
