= 2026 AFC U-23 Asian Cup final =

نهائي كأس آسيا تحت 23 عامًا 2026
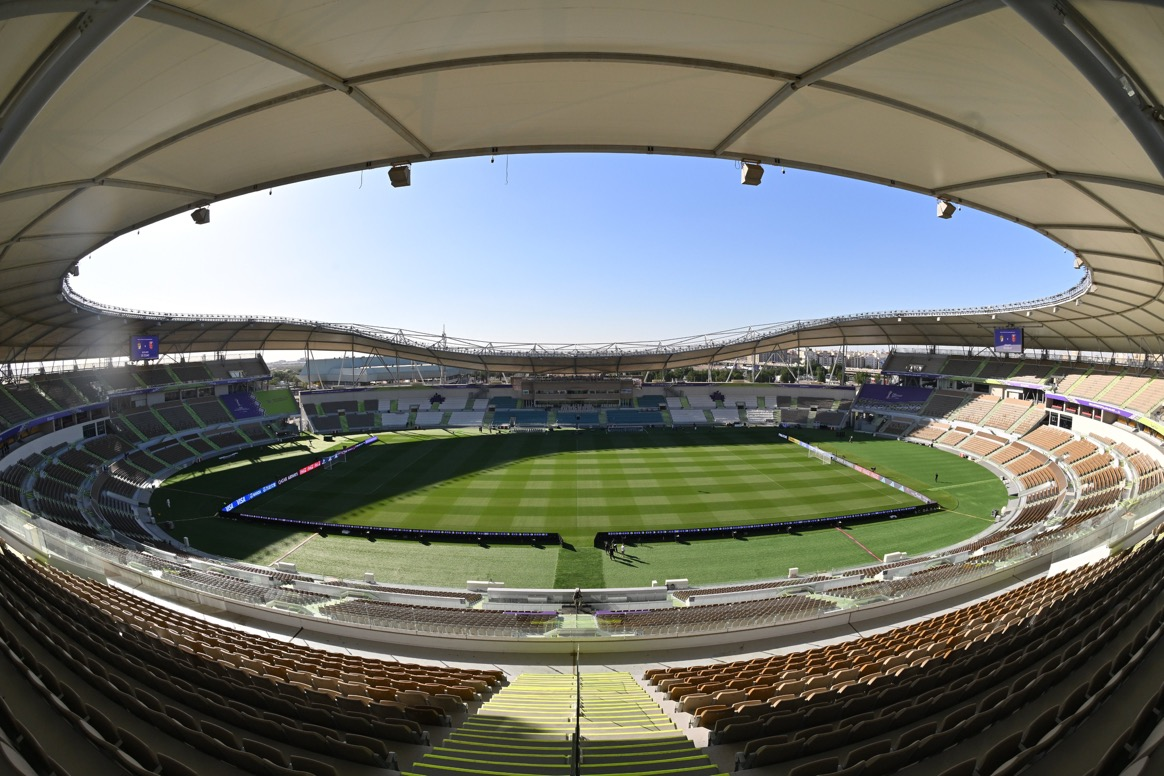
- Al-Faisal Stadium in Jeddah hosted the final.
- Event: 2026 AFC U-23 Asian Cup
China	Japan
(China)	(Japan)
0	4
- Date: 24 January 2026
- Venue: Prince Abdullah Al-Faisal Sports City Stadium, Jeddah
- Man of the Match: (Japan) Kosei Ogura
- Referee: Faisal Al-Balawi (Saudi Arabia)
- Attendance: 8,188

The 2026 AFC U-23 Asian Cup final (Arabic: نهائي كأس آسيا تحت 23 عامًا 2026) was a football match that took place on 24 January 2026 at Prince Abdullah Al-Faisal Sports City Stadium in Jeddah, Saudi Arabia, to determine the winners of the 2026 AFC U-23 Asian Cup. The match was contested by China and the defending champions Japan, the winners of the semi-finals.

Japan won the final 4–0 to win their second consecutive title, and third overall in their participation history.

== Route to the final ==
=== China ===
China entered the tournament as the best runners-up during qualification. At the draw, they were placed in Group D along with Iraq, Australia and Thailand. With China's all previous appearances being eliminated in the group stage, the team was, however, surprisingly undefeated in the group stage of this edition, with one win against Australia by Peng Xiao's only goal, and two goalless draws against Iraq and Thailand, finishing the group as the runners-up.

China's quarter-final match was against Uzbekistan, past champions and two-time defending runners-up. Both teams did not manage to score any goals in 120 minutes, and the match went into penalty shoot-out. The first five kicks were converted with China leading 3–2 before Bekhruz Karimov and Yang Haoyu missed, with Li Hao then saving Dilshod Abdullaev’s attempt to set up Wang Bohao to score the winning penalty to take the East Asians to the semi-final for the first time in the history. China also became the first team scoring just one goal to reach the semi-finals. Facing 2018 runners-up Vietnam in the semi-final, in contrast to their previous matches, China showed a powerful attacking play against the Southeast Asian team. Keeping clean sheet and scoring three goals by Peng Xiao, Xiang Yuwang, and Wang Yudong, the East Asian side went on to reach the final for the first time in the tournament history. This appearance also marked the first time since the 2004 AFC U-17 Championship, had a Chinese representative reach a continental final.

=== Japan ===
Japan participated in the tournament as the Group B winners in their qualification. Drawn in Group B with three West Asian teams, Qatar, the United Arab Emirates and Syria, the defending champions dominated their group with three wins, scoring ten goals and conceding none. Japan also became the first team advanced to the quarter-finals in the tournament after just two matches.

Japan's quarter-final match was against another West Asian team, Jordan. A tough game for the defending champions as they let the Jordanians taking the lead on the 30th minute with a goal by Ali Azaizeh, their first time conceding a goal in the tournament. However, the Jordanians scored an own goal in just five minutes after starting the second half, in which Anas Al-Khob accidentally slipping while Shusuke Furuya was shooting to the goal by target, thus equalising the match. Both teams could not score any goals in the remaining time and the extra time, and the match went into penalty shoot-out. Japan won 4–2 on penalties and advanced into semi-finals after denying two kicks by Mohammad Taha and Mohammad Al-Shatti. Facing their arch rival South Korea in the semi-final, Japan would need an only goal by Kaito Koizumi in the 36th minute and kept the score defensively until full time to secure a place in the final.

China
Round
Japan
Opponents
Result
Group stage
Opponents
Result
Iraq
0–0
Match 1
Syria
5–0
Australia
1–0
Match 2
United Arab Emirates
3–0
Thailand
0–0
Match 3
Qatar
2–0
Group D runners-up

Pos	Team	Pld	Pts
1	Australia	3	6
2	China	3	5
3	Iraq	3	2
4	Thailand	3	2

Source: AFC
Final standings
Group B winners

Pos	Team	Pld	Pts
1	Japan	3	9
2	United Arab Emirates	3	4
3	Syria	3	4
4	Qatar	3	0

Source: AFC
Opponents
Result
Knockout stage
Opponents
Result
Uzbekistan
0–0 (a.e.t.) (4–2 p)
Quarter-finals
Jordan
1–1 (a.e.t.) (4–2 p)
Vietnam
3–0
Semi-finals
South Korea
1–0

== Match details ==
24 January 2026
18:00

China	0–4	Japan
	Report	Ozeki 12'; Ogura 20', 76'; Satō 59' (pen.)

Prince Abdullah Al-Faisal Sports City Stadium, Jeddah
Attendance: 8,188
Referee: Faisal Al-Balawi (Saudi Arabia)

China	Japan

GK	16	Li Hao
RB	4	Umidjan Yusup
CB	5	Liu Haofan (c)
CB	6	Xu Bin		(substituted off) 62'
LB	15	Peng Xiao
RM	23	Alex Yang
CM	20	Li Zhenquan		(substituted off) 62'
CM	8	Mutellip Iminqari		(substituted off) 62'
LM	2	Hu Hetao
CF	7	Xiang Yuwang		(substituted off) 78'
CF	10	Wang Yudong		(substituted off) 85'
Substitutions:
MF	13	Wang Bohao		(substituted on) 62'
MF	18	Chen Zeshi		(substituted on) 62'
MF	21	Bao Shengxin		(substituted on) 62'
FW	9	Behram Abduweli	(yellow card) 81'	(substituted on) 78'
FW	11	Kuai Jiwen		(substituted on) 85'
Manager:
(Spain) Antonio Puche

GK	23	Rui Araki
RB	16	Kaito Koizumi
CB	4	Shuto Nagano
CB	5	Rion Ichihara (c)
LB	2	Rei Umeki
CM	8	Yuto Ozeki		(substituted off) 62'
CM	6	Kosei Ogura	(yellow card) 45'	(substituted off) 78'
RW	20	Shusuke Furuya
AM	10	Ryūnosuke Satō		(substituted off) 85'
LW	11	Yumei Yokoyama		(substituted off) 78'
CF	9	Uche Brian Seo Nwadike		(substituted off) 78'
Substitutions:
MF	17	Yudai Shimamoto		(substituted on) 62'
DF	22	Tariqkani Hayato Okabe		(substituted on) 78'
FW	13	Sena Ishibashi		(substituted on) 78'
FW	19	Yutaka Michiwaki		(substituted on) 78'
MF	7	Nelson Ishiwatari		(substituted on) 85'
Manager:
Gō Ōiwa

Man of the Match:
Kosei Ogura (Japan)

Assistant referees:
Faisal Al-Qahtani (Saudi Arabia)
Ibrahim Al-Dakhil (Saudi Arabia)
Fourth official:
Qasim Al-Hatmi (Oman)
Fifth official:
Nasser Ambusaidi (Oman)
Video assistant referee:
Abdullah Al-Shehri (Saudi Arabia)
Assistant video assistant referee:
Muhammad Taqi (Singapore)

Match rules

- 90 minutes.
- 30 minutes of extra time if necessary.
- Penalty shoot-out if scores still level.
- Maximum of twelve named substitutes.
- Maximum of five substitutions, with a sixth allowed in extra time. (Note: Each team was given only five opportunities to make substitutions, with a sixth opportunity in extra time, excluding substitutions made at half-time, before the start of extra time and at half-time in extra time.)

== See also ==
- 2026 AFC U-23 Asian Cup
- China–Japan football rivalry
