= Japan national under-23 football team =

National association football team

Japan U-23
- Nickname: Olympic Japan
- Association: JFA
- Confederation: AFC
- Sub-confederation: EAFF
- Head coach: Go Oiwa
- Most caps: Mao Hosoya (35)
- Top scorer: Shoya Nakajima (19)
- FIFA code: JPN
| First colours | Second colours |

First international
- Malaysia 1–1 Japan (Kuala Lumpur, Malaysia; December 1990)

Biggest win
- Japan 13–0 Philippines (Hong Kong; 12 June 1999)

Biggest defeat
- Denmark 6–1 Japan (Kuala Lumpur, Malaysia; 6 February 1994)

Olympic Games
- Appearances: 8 (first in 1996)
- Best result: Fourth place (2012, 2020)

Asian Games
- Appearances: 7 (first in 2002)
- Best result: Gold medalists (2010)

AFC U-23 Asian Cup
- Appearances: 7 (first in 2013)
- Best result: Champions (2016, 2024, 2026)

The Japan national under-23 football team (Japanese: U-23サッカー日本代表) is a national association football youth team of Japan and is controlled by the Japan Football Association. The team won a gold medal at the 2010 Asian Games, and the U-20 team, made up of university students and domestic league players, won the 2026 AFC U-23 Asian Cup for the second consecutive year. Since 1992, it was decided that teams targeting athletes under the age of 23 will participate in the Olympics (additional provisions for overage limits have been added since 1996). Therefore, the name changes to Japan national under-22 football team the year before the Olympics and Japan national under-21 football team two years prior. The exception to this was the 2020 Tokyo Olympics, which was postponed one year, so in 2021, the team was called the Japan national under-24 football team. At the 2024 Olympics, they advanced to the Knockout stage without three overage players and several key players.

== Team image ==
=== Nicknames ===
"サムライ・ブルー (Samurai Blue)" basically refers to the Japan national football team, but the under-23 football team are sometimes referred to as "Young" Samurai Blue. However, in reality, Samurai Blue is not often used. In the Olympic Games, the name Olympíc Japan "オリンピックジャパン (Orinpikku Japan)" is used to referred to U-23 national team.

=== Rivalries ===
==== South Korea ====
Japan maintains a strong football rivalry with South Korea, even in youth set-ups.

== Results and fixtures ==
Legend

Win Draw Lose Fixture

=== 2026 ===
| 1 January Friendly | Jordan | 1–1 | Japan | Doha, Qatar |
| 16:00 UTC+3 | Al-Fakhouri | | Goal | Stadium: Hamad bin Khalifa Stadium |
Note: The match was held behind closed doors.

| 7 January 2026 AFC U-23 Asian Cup GS | Japan | 5–0 | Syria | Jeddah, Saudi Arabia |
| 14:30 UTC+3 | Ozeki 10'; Satō 66', 75'; Ishibashi 87'; Michiwaki 90+3' (pen.) | Report | | Stadium: King Abdullah Sports City Hall Stadium; Attendance: 522; Referee: Zaid Thamer Mohammed (Iraq) |

| 10 January 2026 AFC U-23 Asian Cup GS | United Arab Emirates | 0–3 | Japan | Jeddah, Saudi Arabia |
| 14:30 UTC+3 | | Report | Nwadike 5' (pen.); Ozeki 37'; Furuya 82' | Stadium: King Abdullah Sports City Hall Stadium; Attendance: 114; Referee: Qasim Al-Hatmi (Oman) |

| 13 January 2026 AFC U-23 Asian Cup GS | Japan | 2–0 | Qatar | Jeddah, Saudi Arabia |
| 19:30 UTC+3 | Furuya 30'; Satō 80' | Report | | Stadium: King Abdullah Sports City Hall Stadium; Attendance: 190; Referee: Choi Hyun-jai (South Korea) |

| 16 January 2026 AFC U-23 Asian Cup QF | Japan | 1–1 (a.e.t.) (4–2 p) | Jordan | Jeddah, Saudi Arabia |
| 14:30 UTC+3 | Al-Khob 50' (o.g.) | Report | Azaizeh 30' | Stadium: King Abdullah Sports City Hall Stadium; Attendance: 877; Referee: Asker Nadjafaliev (Uzbekistan) |
| | Penalties |
| | Ichihara (penalty scored); Michiwaki (penalty scored); Satō (penalty scored); Kawai (penalty scored) | | (penalty missed) Taha; (penalty scored) Fraij; (penalty scored) Al-Fakhouri; (penalty missed) Al-Shatti |

| 20 January 2026 AFC U-23 Asian Cup SF | Japan | 1–0 | South Korea | Jeddah, Saudi Arabia |
| 14:30 UTC+3 | Koizumi 36' | Report | | Stadium: King Abdullah Sports City Hall Stadium; Attendance: 188; Referee: Abdulla Al-Marri (Qatar) |

| 24 January 2026 AFC U-23 Asian Cup Final | China | 0–4 | Japan | Jeddah, Saudi Arabia |
| 18:00 UTC+3 | | Report | Ozeki 12'; Ogura 20', 76'; Satō 59' (pen.) | Stadium: Prince Abdullah Al-Faisal Sports City Stadium; Attendance: 8,188; Referee: Faisal Al-Balawi (Saudi Arabia) |

| 27 March Friendly | Japan | 0–2 | United States | Cheonan, South Korea |
| 2:00 am EDT | | Report | Yapi; Downs | Stadium: Korea Football Park |

| 29 March Friendly | South Korea | 2–1 | Japan | Cheonan, South Korea |
| 17:00 UTC+9 | Lee Young-jun 34', 49' | Report | Ishii 77' | Stadium: Korea Football Park |

| 16 September Asian Games GS | Japan | 2–0 | Hong Kong | Toyota, Japan |
| 19:30 UTC+9 | Ishii 39'; Nagano 89' | Report | | Stadium: Toyota Stadium; Attendance: 7,720; Referee: Tuan Yaasin (Malaysia) |

| 20 September Asian Games GS | Kyrgyzstan | 0–7 | Japan | Toyota, Japan |
| 19:30 UTC+8 | | Report | Yokoyama 28'; Nagano 36'; Ozeki 39'; Nakajima 70' (pen.); Ishii 72'; Shimamoto 79', 86' | Stadium: Toyota Stadium; Attendance: 19,205; Referee: Payam Heydari (Iran) |

| 23 September Asian Games GS | Japan | 3–0 | Thailand | Toyota, Japan |
| 19:30 UTC+8 | Y. Nakajima 31'; Kosugi 47'; Ishii 48' | Report | | Stadium: Toyota Stadium; Attendance: 18,408; Referee: Kim Woo-sung (South Korea) |

| 26 September Asian Games QF | Japan | 1–0 | North Korea | Toyota, Japan |
| 19:30 UTC+9 | Nwadike 39' | Report | | Stadium: Toyota Stadium; Attendance: 18,912; Referee: Hanna Hattab (Syria) |

| 30 September Asian Games SF | Uzbekistan | 1–1 (a.e.t.) (8–9 p) | Japan | Osaka, Japan |
| 19:30 UTC+9 | Bakhromov 8' | Report | Ishibashi 88' | Stadium: Nagai Stadium; Attendance: 15,550; Referee: Abdulhadi Al-Ruaile (Qatar) |
| | Penalties |
| | Bakhromov (penalty scored); Tulkinbekov (penalty missed); Murtazaev (penalty scored); Reimov (penalty scored); Shodiboev (penalty scored); Rizakulov (penalty scored); Fayzullaev (penalty scored); Khamidov (penalty scored); Ibraimov (penalty scored); Khushvaktov (penalty missed) | | (penalty scored) Nakajima; (penalty scored) Ozeki; (penalty scored) Ishiwatari; (penalty missed) Nwadike; (penalty scored) Tsuchiya; (penalty scored) Shimamoto; (penalty scored) Yokoyama; (penalty scored) Umeki; (penalty scored) Nagano; (penalty scored) Kosugi |

| 3 October Asian Games F | South Korea | v | Japan | Toyota, Japan |
| 19:30 UTC+9 | | Report | | Stadium: Toyota Stadium; Referee: Adam Kersey (Australia) |

- Fixtures & Results (2026)

== Head-to-head record ==
As of 30 September 2026, after the match against Uzbekistan.

The following table shows Japan under-23 team's all-time international record.

| Against | Played | Won | Drawn | Lost | GF | GA | GD | Confederation |
|---|---|---|---|---|---|---|---|---|
| Afghanistan | 1 | 1 | 0 | 0 | 3 | 0 | +3 | AFC |
| Australia | 11 | 5 | 0 | 6 | 20 | 15 | +5 | AFC |
| Bahrain | 3 | 1 | 1 | 1 | 6 | 2 | +4 | AFC |
| Cambodia | 2 | 2 | 0 | 0 | 6 | 0 | +6 | AFC |
| China | 9 | 5 | 0 | 4 | 14 | 5 | +9 | AFC |
| Chinese Taipei | 4 | 4 | 0 | 0 | 15 | 1 | +14 | AFC |
| Hong Kong | 8 | 7 | 0 | 1 | 21 | 4 | +17 | AFC |
| India | 1 | 1 | 0 | 0 | 1 | 0 | +1 | AFC |
| Indonesia | 3 | 3 | 0 | 0 | 10 | 3 | +7 | AFC |
| Iran | 5 | 2 | 2 | 1 | 10 | 7 | +3 | AFC |
| Iraq | 4 | 2 | 1 | 2 | 6 | 6 | 0 | AFC |
| Jordan | 3 | 0 | 3 | 0 | 4 | 4 | 0 | AFC |
| Kuwait | 6 | 4 | 2 | 0 | 21 | 3 | +18 | AFC |
| Kyrgyzstan | 2 | 2 | 0 | 0 | 10 | 0 | +10 | AFC |
| Lebanon | 2 | 2 | 0 | 0 | 6 | 1 | +5 | AFC |
| Macau | 3 | 3 | 0 | 0 | 21 | 0 | +21 | AFC |
| Malaysia | 17 | 13 | 4 | 0 | 47 | 7 | +40 | AFC |
| Myanmar | 4 | 4 | 0 | 0 | 25 | 1 | +24 | AFC |
| Nepal | 5 | 5 | 0 | 0 | 21 | 0 | +21 | AFC |
| North Korea | 5 | 4 | 0 | 1 | 8 | 4 | +4 | AFC |
| Oman | 1 | 1 | 0 | 0 | 4 | 1 | +3 | AFC |
| Pakistan | 3 | 3 | 0 | 0 | 13 | 2 | +11 | AFC |
| Palestine | 6 | 6 | 0 | 0 | 11 | 1 | +10 | AFC |
| Philippines | 3 | 3 | 0 | 0 | 32 | 0 | +32 | AFC |
| Qatar | 9 | 6 | 2 | 1 | 14 | 7 | +7 | AFC |
| Saudi Arabia | 8 | 6 | 1 | 1 | 14 | 7 | +7 | AFC |
| Singapore | 2 | 2 | 0 | 0 | 4 | 1 | +3 | AFC |
| South Korea | 22 | 7 | 3 | 12 | 27 | 25 | +2 | AFC |
| Syria | 3 | 2 | 0 | 1 | 7 | 2 | +5 | AFC |
| Tajikistan | 1 | 1 | 0 | 0 | 3 | 0 | +3 | AFC |
| Thailand | 11 | 10 | 0 | 1 | 29 | 3 | +26 | AFC |
| Timor-Leste | 2 | 2 | 0 | 0 | 7 | 0 | +7 | AFC |
| United Arab Emirates | 8 | 6 | 1 | 1 | 13 | 2 | +11 | AFC |
| Uzbekistan | 5 | 2 | 1 | 2 | 4 | 7 | –3 | AFC |
| Vietnam | 5 | 4 | 0 | 1 | 9 | 1 | +8 | AFC |
| Angola | 1 | 0 | 1 | 0 | 1 | 1 | 0 | CAF |
| Egypt | 6 | 2 | 1 | 3 | 2 | 8 | –6 | CAF |
| Ghana | 4 | 3 | 0 | 1 | 11 | 2 | +9 | CAF |
| Mali | 3 | 1 | 1 | 1 | 3 | 4 | -1 | CAF |
| Morocco | 3 | 3 | 0 | 0 | 7 | 2 | +5 | CAF |
| Nigeria | 3 | 0 | 0 | 3 | 5 | 9 | –4 | CAF |
| South Africa | 3 | 3 | 0 | 0 | 6 | 1 | +5 | CAF |
| Tunisia | 3 | 1 | 0 | 2 | 4 | 6 | –2 | CAF |
| Canada | 1 | 0 | 0 | 1 | 0 | 1 | –1 | CONCACAF |
| Costa Rica | 4 | 1 | 2 | 1 | 5 | 4 | +1 | CONCACAF |
| Honduras | 2 | 1 | 1 | 0 | 3 | 1 | +2 | CONCACAF |
| Jamaica | 2 | 2 | 0 | 0 | 13 | 0 | +13 | CONCACAF |
| Mexico | 5 | 2 | 1 | 2 | 10 | 10 | 0 | CONCACAF |
| United States | 6 | 1 | 2 | 3 | 7 | 11 | –4 | CONCACAF |
| Argentina | 4 | 3 | 0 | 1 | 9 | 3 | +6 | CONMEBOL |
| Brazil | 5 | 2 | 2 | 1 | 6 | 5 | +1 | CONMEBOL |
| Chile | 1 | 1 | 0 | 0 | 6 | 1 | +5 | CONMEBOL |
| Colombia | 2 | 0 | 1 | 1 | 2 | 4 | –2 | CONMEBOL |
| Ecuador | 1 | 0 | 0 | 1 | 0 | 1 | –1 | CONMEBOL |
| Paraguay | 2 | 1 | 0 | 1 | 8 | 4 | +4 | CONMEBOL |
| Venezuela | 1 | 1 | 0 | 0 | 4 | 0 | +4 | CONMEBOL |
| Belgium | 1 | 0 | 0 | 1 | 2 | 3 | –1 | UEFA |
| Croatia | 1 | 1 | 0 | 0 | 1 | 0 | +1 | UEFA |
| Denmark | 2 | 0 | 1 | 1 | 1 | 6 | –5 | UEFA |
| England | 3 | 2 | 1 | 0 | 4 | 1 | +3 | UEFA |
| Israel | 1 | 1 | 0 | 0 | 1 | 0 | +1 | UEFA |
| Italy | 3 | 0 | 1 | 2 | 3 | 7 | –4 | UEFA |
| France | 2 | 1 | 1 | 0 | 5 | 1 | +4 | UEFA |
| Germany | 3 | 1 | 1 | 1 | 9 | 5 | +4 | UEFA |
| Greece | 1 | 0 | 1 | 0 | 1 | 1 | 0 | UEFA |
| Hungary | 1 | 1 | 0 | 0 | 3 | 2 | +1 | UEFA |
| Kazakhstan | 2 | 2 | 0 | 0 | 5 | 1 | +4 | UEFA |
| Netherlands | 2 | 0 | 1 | 1 | 0 | 1 | –1 | UEFA |
| Norway | 1 | 0 | 0 | 1 | 2 | 3 | –1 | UEFA |
| Portugal | 2 | 1 | 0 | 1 | 2 | 2 | 0 | UEFA |
| Republic of Ireland | 1 | 1 | 0 | 0 | 2 | 0 | +2 | UEFA |
| Russia | 5 | 2 | 2 | 1 | 7 | 5 | +2 | UEFA |
| Spain | 5 | 1 | 1 | 3 | 2 | 7 | –5 | UEFA |
| Slovakia | 1 | 1 | 0 | 0 | 2 | 1 | +1 | UEFA |
| Sweden | 1 | 1 | 0 | 0 | 1 | 0 | +1 | UEFA |
| Switzerland | 2 | 1 | 0 | 1 | 3 | 3 | 0 | UEFA |
| Ukraine | 1 | 1 | 0 | 0 | 2 | 0 | +2 | UEFA |
| New Zealand | 4 | 2 | 2 | 0 | 9 | 1 | +8 | OFC |
| Against:78 Nations | Played:287 | Won:175 | Drawn:43 | Lost:69 | GF | GA | GD | Confederation |

== Coaching staff ==
As of 31 July 2026.

| Role | Name |
|---|---|
| Head coach | (Japan) Go Oiwa |
| Assistant coach | (Japan) Kenji Haneda (Japan) Shigeyuki Ochi |
| Goalkeeper coach | (Japan) Yohei Sato |
| Physical coach | (Japan) Yoshiharu Yano |
| Technical staff | (Japan) Shohei Waki (Japan) Haruto Hayama |

== Players ==
=== Current squad ===
The following U-21 players were called up on 31 July 2026 for the 2026 Asian Games, held between September and October.

| No. | Pos. | Player | Date of birth (age) | Club |
|---|---|---|---|---|
| 1 | GK | Alexandre Pisano | 10 January 2006 (age 20) | (Japan Football Association) Nagoya Grampus |
| 12 | GK | Masataka Kobayashi | 20 September 2005 (age 21) | (Japan Football Association) Matsumoto Yamaga |
| 23 | GK | Rui Araki | 14 October 2007 (age 19) | (Japan Football Association) Gamba Osaka |
| 2 | DF | Rei Umeki | 25 August 2005 (age 21) | (Japan Football Association) FC Imabari |
| 3 | DF | Keita Kosugi | 18 March 2006 (age 20) | (German Football Association) Eintracht Frankfurt |
| 4 | DF | Kaito Tsuchiya | 12 May 2006 (age 20) | (Japan Football Association) Fukushima United |
| 5 | DF | Rion Ichihara | 7 July 2005 (age 21) | (Royal Dutch Football Association) AZ Alkmaar |
| 6 | DF | Shuto Nagano | 1 April 2006 (age 20) | (Japan Football Association) FC Tokyo |
| 15 | DF | Soichiro Mori | 29 June 2007 (age 19) | (Japan Football Association) Fagiano Okayama |
| 21 | DF | Mihiro Sato | 26 February 2007 (age 19) | (Japan Football Association) Albirex Niigata |
| 22 | DF | Tariqkani Hayato Okabe | 5 July 2006 (age 20) | (Japan Football Association) Toyo University |
| 7 | MF | Nelson Ishiwatari | 10 May 2005 (age 21) | (Royal Belgian Football Association) Sint-Truiden |
| 8 | MF | Kenshin Yasuda | 5 March 2005 (age 21) | (Japan Football Association) V-Varen Nagasaki |
| 10 | MF | Hisatsugu Ishii | 7 July 2005 (age 21) | (Japan Football Association) Shonan Bellmare |
| 14 | MF | Yuto Ozeki | 6 February 2005 (age 21) | (Japan Football Association) Kawasaki Frontale |
| 17 | MF | Yotaro Nakajima | 22 April 2006 (age 20) | (Japan Football Association) Sanfrecce Hiroshima |
| 18 | MF | Yudai Shimamoto | 26 October 2006 (age 20) | (Japan Football Association) Shimizu S-Pulse |
| 9 | FW | Yutaka Michiwaki | 5 April 2006 (age 20) | (Japan Football Association) Iwaki FC |
| 11 | FW | Yumeki Yokoyama | 23 September 2005 (age 21) | (Japan Football Association) Cerezo Osaka |
| 13 | FW | Shusuke Furuya | 26 January 2005 (age 21) | (Japan Football Association) Tokyo International University |
| 16 | FW | Yuya Fukunaga | 29 August 2005 (age 21) | (Japan Football Association) Kyoto Sangyo University |
| 19 | FW | Brian Nwadike | 7 July 2005 (age 21) | (Danish Football Association) Aalborg |
| 20 | FW | Sena Ishibashi | 22 April 2006 (age 20) | (Japan Football Association) Shonan Bellmare |

=== Previous squads ===
Bold indicates winning squads

Olympic Games

- 1996 Summer Olympics Squad
- 2000 Summer Olympics Squad
- 2004 Summer Olympics Squad
- 2008 Summer Olympics Squad
- 2012 Summer Olympics Squad
- 2016 Summer Olympics Squad
- 2020 Summer Olympics Squad
- 2024 Summer Olympics Squad

AFC U-23 Asian Cup

- 2013 AFC U-22 Championship Squad
- **2016 AFC U-23 Championship Squad**
- 2018 AFC U-23 Championship Squad
- 2020 AFC U-23 Championship Squad
- 2022 AFC U-23 Asian Cup Squad
- **2024 AFC U-23 Asian Cup Squad**
- **2026 AFC U-23 Asian Cup Squad**

Asian Games

- 2002 Asian Games Squad
- 2006 Asian Games Squad
- **2010 Asian Games Squad**
- 2014 Asian Games Squad
- 2018 Asian Games Squad
- 2022 Asian Games Squad
- 2026 Asian Games Squad

=== Overaged players in the Olympic Games ===
| Tournament | Player 1 | Player 2 | Player 3 |
|---|---|---|---|
| 1996 | not selected | | |
| 2000 | Seigo Narazaki (GK) | Ryuzo Morioka (DF) | Atsuhiro Miura (MF) |
| 2004 | Hitoshi Sogahata (GK) | Shinji Ono (MF) | not selected |
| 2008 | not selected | | |
| 2012 | Maya Yoshida (DF) | Yūhei Tokunaga (DF) | not selected |
| 2016 | Hiroki Fujiharu (DF) | Tsukasa Shiotani (DF) | Shinzo Koroki (FW) |
| 2020 | Maya Yoshida (DF) | Hiroki Sakai (DF) | Wataru Endo (MF) |
| 2024 | not selected | | |

== Manager history ==
| Name | Period |
|---|---|
| (Japan) Yoshitada Yamaguchi | 1990–1992 |
| (Japan) Akira Nishino | 1993–1996 |
| (France) Philippe Troussier | 1998–2000 |
| (Japan) Masakuni Yamamoto | 2002–2004 |
| (Japan) Yasuharu Sorimachi | 2006–2008 |
| (Japan) Takashi Sekizuka | 2010–2012 |
| (Japan) Makoto Teguramori | 2014–2016 |
| (Japan) Hajime Moriyasu | 2017–2020 |
| (Japan) Akinobu Yokouchi | 2020 |
| (Japan) Hajime Moriyasu | 2020–2021 |
| (Japan) Koichi Togashi | 2021 |
| (Japan) Go Oiwa | 2021–present |

== Records ==
As of 2 August 2024
Players in bold are still active, at least at club level.
Caps and goals are calculated taking into account all national team levels, including U21, U22, and U23.

=== Most capped players ===
| # | Name | Caps | Goals | Pos | Career |
|---|---|---|---|---|---|
| 1 | Mao Hosoya | 35 | 16 | FW | 2021–2024 |
| 2 | Kein Sato | 33 | 8 | MF | 2021–2024 |
| 3 | Keigo Higashi | 31 | 5 | MF | 2010–2012 |
| 3 | Kensuke Nagai | 31 | 13 | FW | 2009–2012 |
| 3 | Reo Hatate | 31 | 8 | MF | 2017–2021 |
| 6 | Shoya Nakajima | 30 | 19 | FW | 2014–2016 |
| 7 | Hotaru Yamaguchi | 29 | 1 | MF | 2010–2012 |
| 8 | Kazuya Yamamura | 26 | 1 | DF | 2010–2012 |
| 8 | Hiroki Sakai | 26 | 3 | DF | 2011–2021 |
| 10 | Daisuke Matsui | 25 | 2 | MF | 2002–2004 |

=== Top goalscorers ===
| # | Name | Goals | Caps | Ratio | Career |
|---|---|---|---|---|---|
| 1 | Shoya Nakajima | 19 | 30 | 0.63 | 2014–2016 |
| 2 | Mao Hosoya | 16 | 35 | 0.46 | 2021–2024 |
| 3 | Kensuke Nagai | 13 | 31 | 0.42 | 2009–2012 |
| 4 | Ayase Ueda | 12 | 24 | 0.5 | 2017–2021 |
| 5 | Daizen Maeda | 9 | 18 | 0.5 | 2018–2021 |
| 6 | Reo Hatate | 8 | 31 | 0.26 | 2017–2021 |
| 6 | Kein Sato | 8 | 33 | 0.24 | 2021–2024 |
| 7 | Musashi Suzuki | 7 | 10 | 0.7 | 2014–2016 |
| 7 | Takefusa Kubo | 7 | 18 | 0.39 | 2018–2021 |
| 7 | Yuito Suzuki | 7 | 20 | 0.35 | 2021–2023 |

== Competitive record ==
Champions Runners-up Third place Fourth place

=== Olympic Games ===
| Summer Olympics record | | | | | | | | | | | | | Qualification record | | |
| Year | Round | Position | Pld | W | D | L | GF | GA | Pld | W | D | L | GF | GA | Link |
|---|---|---|---|---|---|---|---|---|---|---|---|---|---|---|---|
| 1908–1988 | See Japan national team | | | | | | | | See Japan national team | | | | | | |
| (Spain) 1992 | Did not qualify | | | | | | | | 11 | 6 | 1 | 4 | 22 | 11 | Link |
| (United States) 1996 | Group stage | 9th | 3 | 2 | 0 | 1 | 4 | 4 | 9 | 7 | 1 | 1 | 25 | 6 | Link |
| (Australia) 2000 | Quarter-finals | 5th | 4 | 2 | 1 | 1 | 6 | 5 | 12 | 12 | 0 | 0 | 66 | 3 | Link |
| (Greece) 2004 | Group stage | 13th | 3 | 1 | 0 | 2 | 6 | 7 | 8 | 6 | 1 | 1 | 19 | 2 | Link |
| (China) 2008 | Group stage | 15th | 3 | 0 | 0 | 3 | 1 | 4 | 12 | 9 | 2 | 1 | 24 | 4 | Link |
| (United Kingdom) 2012 | Fourth place | 4th | 6 | 3 | 1 | 2 | 6 | 5 | 8 | 6 | 0 | 2 | 17 | 6 | Link |
| (Brazil) 2016 | Group stage | 10th | 3 | 1 | 1 | 1 | 7 | 7 | via AFC U-23 Asian Cup | | | | | | |
| (Japan) 2020 | Fourth place | 4th | 6 | 3 | 1 | 2 | 8 | 5 | via AFC U-23 Asian Cup | | | | | | |
| (France) 2024 | Quarter-finals | 5th | 4 | 3 | 0 | 1 | 7 | 3 | via AFC U-23 Asian Cup | | | | | | |
| (United States) 2028 | To be determinated | | | | | | | | To be determinated | | | | | | |
| (Australia) 2032 | To be determinated | | | | | | | | To be determinated | | | | | | |
| Total | Fourth place | 12/13 | 32 | 15 | 4 | 13 | 45 | 40 | 60 | 46 | 5 | 9 | 173 | 32 | Link |

==== Match history ====
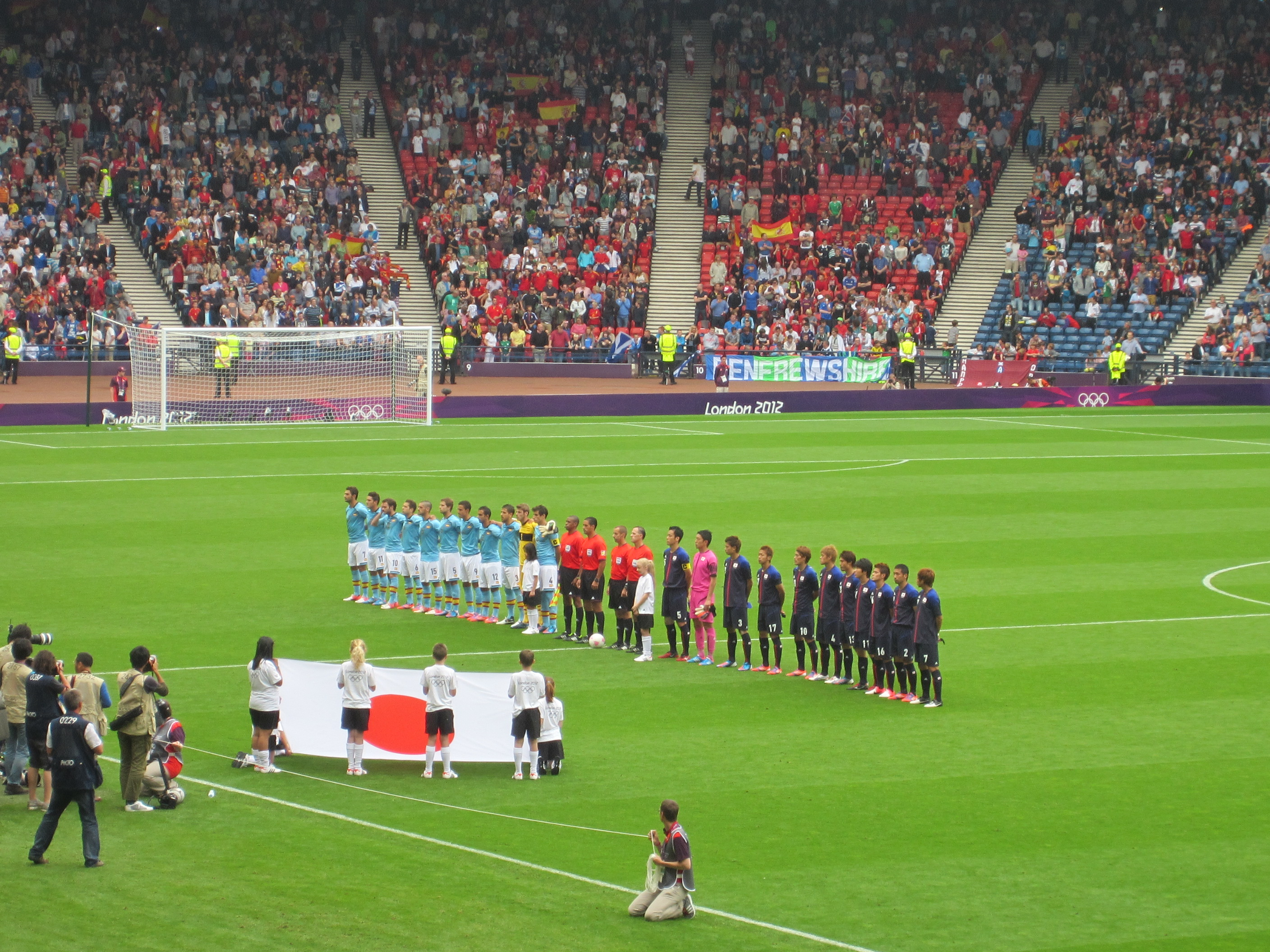
A match vs Spain at the 2012 Summer Olympics at Glasgow in the United Kingdom

Summer Olympics history
| Year | Round | Opponent | Score | Result |
|---|---|---|---|---|
| 1996 | Group stage | Brazil | 1–0 | Win |
| 1996 | Group stage | Nigeria | 0–2 | Loss |
| 1996 | Group stage | Hungary | 3–2 | Win |
| 2000 | Group stage | South Africa | 2–1 | Win |
| 2000 | Group stage | Slovakia | 2–1 | Win |
| 2000 | Group stage | Brazil | 0–1 | Loss |
| 2000 | Quarter-finals | United States | 2–2 (a.e.t.); 4–5 (p) | Draw; Loss |
| 2004 | Group stage | Paraguay | 3–4 | Loss |
| 2004 | Group stage | Italy | 2–3 | Loss |
| 2004 | Group stage | Ghana | 1–0 | Win |
| 2008 | Group stage | United States | 0–1 | Loss |
| 2008 | Group stage | Nigeria | 1–2 | Loss |
| 2008 | Group stage | Netherlands | 0–1 | Loss |
| 2012 | Group stage | Spain | 1–0 | Win |
| 2012 | Group stage | Morocco | 1–0 | Win |
| 2012 | Group stage | Honduras | 0–0 | Draw |
| 2012 | Quarter-finals | Egypt | 3–0 | Win |
| 2012 | Semi-finals | Mexico | 1–3 | Loss |
| 2012 | Bronze Play-off | South Korea | 0–2 | Loss |
| 2016 | Group stage | Nigeria | 4–5 | Loss |
| 2016 | Group stage | Colombia | 2–2 | Draw |
| 2016 | Group stage | Sweden | 1–0 | Win |
| 2020 | Group stage | South Africa | 1–0 | Win |
| 2020 | Group stage | Mexico | 2–1 | Win |
| 2020 | Group stage | France | 4–0 | Win |
| 2020 | Quarter-finals | New Zealand | 0–0 (a.e.t.); 4–2 (p) | Draw; Win |
| 2020 | Semi-finals | Spain | 0–1 (a.e.t.) | Loss |
| 2020 | Bronze Play-off | Mexico | 1–3 | Loss |
| 2024 | Group stage | Paraguay | 5–0 | Win |
| 2024 | Group stage | Mali | 1–0 | Win |
| 2024 | Group stage | Israel | 1–0 | Win |
| 2024 | Quarter-finals | Spain | 0–3 | Loss |

=== AFC U-23 Asian Cup ===
| AFC U-23 Asian Cup record | | | | | | | | | Qualifier record | | | | | |
| Year | Result | Position | GP | W | D | L | GS | GA | GP | W | D | L | GS | GA |
|---|---|---|---|---|---|---|---|---|---|---|---|---|---|---|
| (Oman) 2013 | Quarter-finals | 7th | 4 | 1 | 2 | 1 | 8 | 5 | 5 | 5 | 0 | 0 | 20 | 2 |
| (Qatar) 2016 | Champions | 1st | 6 | 6 | 0 | 0 | 15 | 4 | 3 | 3 | 0 | 0 | 10 | 0 |
| (China) 2018 | Quarter-finals | 5th | 4 | 3 | 0 | 1 | 5 | 5 | 3 | 3 | 0 | 0 | 11 | 2 |
| (Thailand) 2020 | Group stage | 15th | 3 | 0 | 1 | 2 | 3 | 5 | 3 | 3 | 0 | 0 | 21 | 0 |
| (Uzbekistan) 2022 | Third place | 3rd | 6 | 4 | 1 | 1 | 11 | 3 | 2 | 2 | 0 | 0 | 8 | 0 |
| (Qatar) 2024 | Champions | 1st | 6 | 5 | 0 | 1 | 10 | 3 | 3 | 2 | 1 | 0 | 7 | 0 |
| (Saudi Arabia) 2026 | Champions | 1st | 6 | 5 | 1 | 0 | 16 | 1 | 3 | 3 | 0 | 0 | 11 | 2 |
| (Japan) 2028 | Qualified as host | | | | | | | | Qualified as host | | | | | |
| Total | 8/8 | 3 Titles | 35 | 24 | 5 | 6 | 68 | 26 | 22 | 21 | 1 | 0 | 88 | 6 |

==== Match history ====
AFC U-23 Asian Cup history
| Year | Round | Opponent | Score | Result |
|---|---|---|---|---|
| 2013 | Group stage | Iran | 3–3 | Draw |
| 2013 | Group stage | Kuwait | 0–0 | Draw |
| 2013 | Group stage | Australia | 4–0 | Win |
| 2013 | Quarter-finals | Iraq | 0–1 | Loss |
| 2016 | Group stage | North Korea | 1–0 | Win |
| 2016 | Group stage | Thailand | 4–0 | Win |
| 2016 | Group stage | Saudi Arabia | 2–1 | Win |
| 2016 | Quarter-finals | Iran | 3–0 (a.e.t.) | Win |
| 2016 | Semi-finals | Iraq | 2–1 | Win |
| 2016 | Final | South Korea | 3–2 | Win |
| 2018 | Group stage | Palestine | 1–0 | Win |
| 2018 | Group stage | Thailand | 1–0 | Win |
| 2018 | Group stage | North Korea | 3–1 | Win |
| 2018 | Quarter-finals | Uzbekistan | 0–4 | Loss |
| 2020 | Group stage | Saudi Arabia | 1–2 | Loss |
| 2020 | Group stage | Syria | 1–2 | Loss |
| 2020 | Group stage | Qatar | 1–1 | Draw |
| 2022 | Group stage | UAE | 2–1 | Win |
| 2022 | Group stage | Saudi Arabia | 0–0 | Draw |
| 2022 | Group stage | Tajikistan | 3–0 | Win |
| 2022 | Quarter-finals | South Korea | 3–0 | Win |
| 2022 | Semi-finals | Uzbekistan | 0–2 | Loss |
| 2022 | 3rd place match | Australia | 3–0 | Win |
| 2024 | Group stage | China | 1–0 | Win |
| 2024 | Group stage | UAE | 2–0 | Win |
| 2024 | Group stage | South Korea | 0–1 | Loss |
| 2024 | Quarter-finals | Qatar | 4–2 (a.e.t.) | Win |
| 2024 | Semi-finals | Iraq | 2–0 | Win |
| 2024 | Final | Uzbekistan | 1–0 | Win |
| 2026 | Group stage | Syria | 5–0 | Win |
| 2026 | Group stage | UAE | 3–0 | Win |
| 2026 | Group stage | Qatar | 2–0 | Win |
| 2026 | Quarter-finals | Jordan | 1–1 (a.e.t.); 4–2 (p) | Draw; Win |
| 2026 | Semi-finals | South Korea | 1–0 | Win |
| 2026 | Final | China | 4–0 | Win |

=== Asian Games ===
Asian Games record
| Hosts / Year | Result | Position | GP | W | D | L | GS | GA |
|---|---|---|---|---|---|---|---|---|
| (South Korea) 2002 | Silver | 2 | 6 | 5 | 0 | 1 | 13 | 4 |
| (Qatar) 2006 | Round 1 | 11 | 3 | 2 | 0 | 1 | 5 | 4 |
| (China) 2010 | Gold | 1 | 7 | 7 | 0 | 0 | 17 | 1 |
| (South Korea) 2014 | Quarter-finals | 6 | 5 | 3 | 0 | 2 | 10 | 5 |
| (Indonesia) 2018 | Silver | 2 | 7 | 5 | 0 | 2 | 10 | 4 |
| (China) 2022 | Silver | 2 | 6 | 5 | 0 | 1 | 18 | 4 |
| (Japan) 2026 | Silver | 2 | 6 | 4 | 1 | 1 | 14 | 2 |
(Qatar) 2030
(Saudi Arabia) 2034
| Total | 7/7 | Gold | 40 | 31 | 1 | 8 | 87 | 24 |

==== Match history ====
Asian Games history
| Year | Round | Opponent | Score | Result |
|---|---|---|---|---|
| 2002 | Round 1 | Palestine | 2–0 | Win |
| 2002 | Round 1 | Bahrain | 5–2 | Win |
| 2002 | Round 1 | Uzbekistan | 1–0 | Win |
| 2002 | Quarter-finals | China | 1–0 | Win |
| 2002 | Semi-finals | Thailand | 3–0 | Win |
| 2002 | Final | Iran | 1–2 | Loss |
| 2006 | Round 1 | Pakistan | 3–2 | Win |
| 2006 | Round 1 | Syria | 1–0 | Win |
| 2006 | Round 1 | North Korea | 1–2 | Loss |
| 2010 | Round 1 | China | 3–0 | Win |
| 2010 | Round 1 | Malaysia | 2–0 | Win |
| 2010 | Round 1 | Kyrgyzstan | 3–0 | Win |
| 2010 | Round 2 | India | 5–0 | Win |
| 2010 | Quarter-finals | Thailand | 1–0 | Win |
| 2010 | Semi-finals | Iran | 2–1 | Win |
| 2010 | Final | UAE | 1–0 | Win |
| 2014 | Round 1 | Kuwait | 4–1 | Win |
| 2014 | Round 1 | Iraq | 1–3 | Loss |
| 2014 | Round 1 | Nepal | 4–0 | Win |
| 2014 | Round 2 | Palestine | 4–0 | Win |
| 2014 | Quarter-finals | South Korea | 0–1 | Loss |
| 2018 | Round 1 | Nepal | 1–0 | Win |
| 2018 | Round 1 | Pakistan | 4–0 | Win |
| 2018 | Round 1 | Vietnam | 0–1 | Loss |
| 2018 | Round 2 | Malaysia | 1–0 | Win |
| 2018 | Quarter-finals | Saudi Arabia | 2–1 | Win |
| 2018 | Semi-finals | UAE | 1–0 | Win |
| 2018 | Final | South Korea | 1–2 | Loss |
| 2022 | Round 1 | Qatar | 3–1 | Win |
| 2022 | Round 1 | Palestine | 1–0 | Win |
| 2022 | Round 1 | Myanmar | 7–0 | Win |
| 2022 | Quarter-finals | North Korea | 2–1 | Win |
| 2022 | Semi-finals | Hong Kong | 4–0 | Win |
| 2022 | Final | South Korea | 1–2 | Loss |
| 2026 | Round 1 | Hong Kong | 2–0 | Win |
| 2026 | Round 1 | Kyrgyzstan | 7–0 | Win |
| 2026 | Round 1 | Thailand | 3–0 | Win |
| 2026 | Quarter-finals | North Korea | 1–0 | Win |
| 2026 | Semi-finals | Uzbekistan | 1–1 (9–8 pen.) | Win |
| 2026 | Final | South Korea | 0–1 | Loss |

== See also ==
- Sport in Japan
  - Football in Japan
    - Women's football in Japan
- Japan Football Association (JFA)
- Kirin Cup (Invitational tournament)
- Kirin Challenge Cup (International friendly match)
- Kirin Company

National teams
Men's

- National football team
  - Results and fixtures
    - 2020–present
  - International footballers
- National under-23 football team
- National under-20 football team
- National under-17 football team
- National futsal team
- National under-20 futsal team
- National beach soccer team

Women's

- National football team
  - Results and fixtures
    - 2021
  - International footballers
- National under-20 football team
- National under-17 football team
- National futsal team
