= Jordan national under-23 football team =

Men's football team

Jordan U-23
- Nickname(s): النشامى; Al-Nashāmā ("The Chivalrous")
- Association: Jordan Football Association
- Confederation: AFC (Asia)
- Sub-confederation: WAFF (West Asia)
- Head coach: Abdellatif Jrindou
- FIFA code: JOR
First colours	Second colours

AFC U-23 Asian Cup
- Appearances: 7 (first in 2013)
- Best result: Third place (2013)

Asian Games
- Appearances: 3 (first in 2006)
- Best result: Quarterfinals (2014)

WAFF U-23 Championship
- Appearances: 4 (first in 2015)
- Best result: (gold) Champions (2021)

The Jordan national under-23 football team (Arabic: منتخب الأردن لكرة القدم تحت 23 سنة), also known as the Jordan Olympic football team (Arabic: منتخب الأردن الأولمبي لكرة القدم). is a national association football youth team representing Jordan in Olympics, AFC U-23 Championship, WAFF U-23 Championship and any other under-23 international football tournaments. It is controlled by the Jordan Football Association.

== Team image ==
=== Kit providers ===
Kit supplier	Period
(Germany) Puma	1997–1999
(Germany) Adidas	1999–2005
(Germany) Jako	2006–2007
(Germany) Uhlsport	2009–2011
(Germany) Jako	2012–2015
(Germany) Adidas	2015–2018
(Spain) Joma	2018–2021
(England) Umbro	2021–2022
(Germany) Jako	2022–2024
(Spain) Kelme	2024–2026

== Recent fixtures ==
=== 2025 ===
13 November Friendly	Jordan	2–1	Syria	Amman, Jordan
17:00	Deeb 60', 83'	Report	Goal	Stadium: King Abdullah II Stadium

18 November Friendly	Jordan	1–1	Syria	Amman, Jordan
17:00	Al-Shanaineh 87' (pen.)	Report	Al-Mustafa 80'	Stadium: King Abdullah II Stadium

27 December Closed-door friendly	Jordan	0–0	Uzbekistan	Doha, Qatar
17:00 (UTC+3)				Stadium: Suheim bin Hamad Stadium

=== 2026 ===
1 January Friendly	Jordan	1–1	Japan	Doha, Qatar
16:00 (UTC+3)	Al-Fakhouri		Goal	Stadium: Hamad bin Khalifa Stadium
Note: The match was held behind closed doors.

6 January 2026 U-23 Asian Cup Group A	Vietnam	2–0	Jordan	Jeddah, Saudi Arabia
14:30	Nguyễn Đình Bắc 15' (pen.); Nguyễn Hiểu Minh 42'	Report		Stadium: King Abdullah Sports City Hall Stadium; Attendance: 219; Referee: Choi Hyun-jai (South Korea)

9 January 2026 U-23 Asian Cup Group A	Jordan	3–2	Saudi Arabia	Jeddah, Saudi Arabia
14:30	Azaizeh 38', 45+1'; Deeb 73'	Report	Al-Ghamdi 19'; Al-Juwayr 60' (pen.)	Stadium: Prince Abdullah Al-Faisal Sports City Stadium; Attendance: 5,593; Referee: Ryo Tanimoto (Japan)

12 January 2026 U-23 Asian Cup Group A	Jordan	1–0	Kyrgyzstan	Jeddah, Saudi Arabia
19:30	Azaizeh 33'	Report		Stadium: King Abdullah Sports City Stadium; Attendance: 728; Referee: Ammar Mahfoodh (Bahrain)

16 January 2026 U-23 Asian Cup Quarter-finals	Japan	1–1 (a.e.t.) (4–2 p)	Jordan	Jeddah, Saudi Arabia
14:30	Al-Khob 50' (o.g.)	Report	Azaizeh 30'	Stadium: King Abdullah Sports City Hall Stadium; Referee: Asker Nadjafaliev (Uzbekistan)
	Penalties
	Ichihara (penalty scored); Michiwaki (penalty scored); Satō (penalty scored); Kawai (penalty scored)		(penalty missed) Taha; (penalty scored) Fraij; (penalty scored) Al-Fakhouri; (penalty missed) Al-Shatti

27 March Friendly	Jordan	2–1	Kyrgyzstan	Antalya, Türkiye
13:00 (UTC+3)	Hammadi 30'; Al-Saket 45+3'	Report	Alisherov 58'	Stadium: Antalya Atatürk Stadium

30 March Friendly	Jordan	2–1	Russia	Antalya, Türkiye
15:00 (UTC+3)	Fraij 36'; Al-Saket 89'	Report	Pestryakov 72'	Stadium: Antalya Atatürk Stadium

14 November Friendly	United Arab Emirates	2–2	Jordan	Dubai, United Arab Emirates
16:50 (UTC+4)	Naafo 45+1'; Abbas 49'	Report (JFA) Report (UAE)	Al-Zaghaiba 20', 65'	Stadium: Jebel Ali Centre of Excellence

17 November Friendly	United Arab Emirates	0–2	Jordan	Dubai, United Arab Emirates
17:00 (UTC+4)		Report	Qasem 40', 75'	Stadium: Jebel Ali Centre of Excellence

== Coaching history ==
- (Jordan) Mohammad Awad (1988–1992)
- (Jordan) Issa Al-Turk (2002–2003)
- (Jordan) Nihad Al-Souqar (2006–2007)
- (Egypt) Alaa' Nabil (2010–2011)
- (Jordan) Islam Al-Thiabat (of U-22) (2012–2014)
- (Jordan) Jamal Abu Abed (2013–2016)
- (Jordan) Ahmed Abdel-Qader (2016 & 2018–2020)
- (England) Iain Brunskill (2017–2018)
- (Jordan) Ahmad Hayel (2020–2022)
- (Jordan) Abdullah Abu Zema (2022–2024)
- (Morocco) Omar Najhi (2024–2026)
- (Morocco) Abdellatif Jrindou (2026–)

== Current coaching staff ==
Technical director	(Tunisia) Abdelhay Ben Soltane
Head coach	(Morocco) Abdellatif Jrindou
Assistant coach	(Jordan) Shadi Abu Hash'hash (Jordan) Ibrahim Al-Saqqar
Goalkeeping coach	(Jordan)

== Players ==
=== Current squad ===
The following 24 players were called up to face the United Arab Emirates on 14 and 17 November 2026. On 9 November, Mohammad Abu Ghoush was called up to the senior national team to replace the injured Ahmad Ersan.

Head coach: (Morocco) Abdellatif Jrindou

No.	Pos.	Player	Date of birth (age)	Club
1	GK	Salameh Salman	7 May 2005 (age 21)	(Jordan Football Association) Shabab Al-Ordon
12	GK	Mohammed Al-Ali	5 August 2006 (age 20)	(Jordan Football Association) Al-Ramtha
22	GK	Moataz Al-Shamaila	2009 (age 16–17)	(Jordan Football Association) Al-Faisaly
2	DF	Mohammad Al-Shatti	30 November 2006 (age 19)	(Jordan Football Association) Al-Ahli
3	DF	Ayham Al-Samamreh	9 May 2006 (age 20)	(Jordan Football Association) Al-Wehdat
4	DF	Omar Al-Khatib	2007 (age 18–19)	(Jordan Football Association) Doqara
16	DF	Iyad Al-Amawy	21 February 2007 (age 19)	(Jordan Football Association) Al-Yarmouk
19	DF	Mohammad Haddad	14 March 2006 (age 20)	(Jordan Football Association) Al-Faisaly
21	DF	Mohanad Al-Mahsiri	22 June 2008 (age 18)	(Jordan Football Association) Al-Wehdat
23	DF	Abdallah Al-Mnayyes	17 June 2005 (age 21)	(Jordan Football Association) Al-Ramtha
24	DF	Nouraldin Yaseen	9 January 2005 (age 21)	(Jordan Football Association) Al-Wehdat
5	MF	Ali Al-Nueimi	20 May 2007 (age 19)	(Jordan Football Association) Al-Hussein
6	MF	Saleh Fraij	3 November 2006 (age 20)	(Jordan Football Association) Al-Salt
8	MF	Mohammad Al-Baytar	13 July 2007 (age 19)	(Jordan Football Association) Al-Ramtha
10	MF	Mahmoud Deeb	8 September 2005 (age 21)	(Jordan Football Association) Al-Hussein
13	MF	Ahed Jado	2006 (age 19–20)	(Jordan Football Association) Al-Wehdat
7	FW	Mohammad Qasem	2 February 2006 (age 20)	(Jordan Football Association) Al-Faisaly
9	FW	Abdulrahman Al-Zaghaiba	10 April 2007 (age 19)	(Jordan Football Association) Al-Jazeera
11	FW	Qutaiba Al-Ajalin	12 July 2006 (age 20)	(Jordan Football Association) Al-Faisaly
14	FW	Naser Al-Dajani	1 January 2007 (age 19)	(Royal Spanish Football Federation) Córdoba B
17	FW	Omar Ghanajoq	18 October 2005 (age 21)	(Jordan Football Association) Al-Hussein
20	FW	Moamen Al-Saket	8 July 2005 (age 21)	(Jordan Football Association) Al-Hussein
25	FW	Qais Al-Khulaifat	20 June 2006 (age 20)	(Jordan Football Association) Al-Ahli

=== Recent call-ups ===
The following players have been called up for the team and are still available for selection.

Pos.	Player	Date of birth (age)	Caps	Goals	Club	Latest call-up
GK	Mohammad Al-Shloul	29 January 2008 (age 18)	-	-	(Jordan) Al-Hussein	September Training camp
GK	Abdullah Al-Shaqran	9 March 2006 (age 20)	-	-	(Jordan) Al-Ramtha	May Training camp
GK	Mohammad Al-Tarayreh	15 February 2006 (age 20)	-	-	(Jordan) Al-Wehdat	v. Russia, 30 March 2026
DF	Mohammad Abu Ghoush	13 July 2005 (age 21)	-	-	(Jordan) Shabab Al-Ordon	November Training camp ^{JOR}
DF	Ahed Al-Shahadat		-	-	(Jordan) Doqara	September Training camp
DF	Adnan Nofal	9 May 2005 (age 21)	-	-	(Jordan) Doqara	May Training camp
DF	Omar Marar	7 February 2005 (age 21)	-	-	(Jordan) Al-Baqa'a	v. Russia, 30 March 2026
MF	Salahaldeen Farash	22 August 2006 (age 20)	-	-	(Jordan) Shabab Al-Ordon	September Training camp
MF	Adeeb Ramadan	3 March 2007 (age 19)	-	-	(Jordan) Al-Hussein	September Training camp
MF	Qais Al-Shawashreh	17 January 2008 (age 18)	-	-	(Jordan) Al-Salt	September Training camp
MF	Abdallah Tannous		-	-	(Jordan) Al-Jazeera	May Training camp
MF	Mohammad Hani	26 August 2006 (age 20)	-	-	(Jordan) Al-Faisaly	May training gamp
MF	Husam Al-Qudah	20 April 2005 (age 21)	-	-	(Jordan) Al-Sarhan	May Training camp
MF	Zaid Rasas	20 July 2005 (age 21)	-	-	(Jordan) Al-Faisaly	v. Russia, 30 March 2026
MF	Yazan Al-Awaqleh	5 December 2005 (age 20)	-	-	(Jordan) Al-Ramtha	v. Russia, 30 March 2026
MF	Qusai Abu Taha		-	-	(Jordan) Al-Wehdat	v. Russia, 30 March 2026
MF	Yousef Qashi	15 April 2005 (age 21)	-	-	(Jordan) Al-Hussein	March training camp ^{JOR}
MF	Izz al-Din Abu Al-Saud	24 July 2005 (age 21)	-	-	(Jordan) Al-Ahli	May 2025 Training camp
FW	Mahmoud Al-Tmaizi	4 April 2008 (age 18)	-	-	(Jordan) Al-Hussein	September Training camp
FW	Izz Alden Abu Aqoleh	19 November 2006 (age 19)	-	-	(Jordan) Al-Ramtha	May Training camp
FW	Suhaib Hijazi	2005 (age 20–21)	-	-	(Jordan) Sahl Horan	v. Russia, 30 March 2026
FW	Odeh Al-Fakhouri	22 November 2005 (age 20)	-	-	(Egypt) Pyramids	2026 AFC U-23 Asian Cup ^{JOR}
FW	Anas Al-Khob	1 February 2006 (age 20)	-	-	(Jordan) Al-Faisaly	2026 AFC U-23 Asian Cup ^{INJ}
^{PRE} Part of the preliminary squad^{INJ} Player injured^{CLB} Player refused by club or unable to attend due to club commitments^{JOR} Player moved up to the first team^{OVR} Player overaged and ineligible to represent this age group^{WD} Player withdrew for non-injury related reasons

== Previous squads ==
AFC U-23 Championship

- 2013 AFC U22 Championship squad
- 2016 AFC U23 Championship squad
- 2018 AFC U23 Championship squad
- 2020 AFC U23 Championship squad
- 2022 AFC U23 Asian Cup squad
- 2024 AFC U23 Asian Cup squad
- 2026 AFC U23 Asian Cup squad

Asian Games

- 2006 Asian Games squad
- 2010 Asian Games squad
- 2014 Asian Games squad

== Tournament records ==
=== Summer Olympics ===
Since 1992, football at the Summer Olympics changes into Under-23 tournament.

Olympics Record
Hosts / Year	Result	Position	GP	W	D	L	GS	GA
1956 to 1988	See Jordan national football team							
1992 to 2024	Did not qualify							
(United States) 2028	To be determined							
(Australia) 2032	To be determined							
Total	—	—	—	—	—	—	—	—

=== AFC U-23 Championship ===
AFC U-23 Championship Record
Hosts / Year	Result	Position	GP	W	D	L	GS	GA
(Oman) 2013	Third place	3rd	6	3	2	1	10	5
(Qatar) 2016	Quarterfinals	7th	4	1	2	1	3	2
(China) 2018	Group stage	12th	3	0	2	1	3	4
(Thailand) 2020	Quarterfinals	5th	4	1	2	1	4	4
(Uzbekistan) 2022	Group stage	10th	3	1	1	1	2	2
(Qatar) 2024	Group stage	14th	3	0	1	2	2	6
(Saudi Arabia) 2026	Quarterfinals	6th	4	2	1	1	5	5
(Japan) 2028	To be determined							
Total	Third place	7/8	27	8	11	8	29	28

=== Asian Games ===
Asian Games Record
Hosts / Year	Result	Position	GP	W	D	L	GF	GA
(South Korea) Busan 2002	Withdrew							
(Qatar) Doha 2006	Round 2	19	6	1	3	2	15	7
(China) Guangzhou 2010	Group stage	21	3	0	1	2	0	7
(South Korea) Incheon 2014	Quarterfinals	7	4	3	0	1	5	2
(Indonesia) Jakarta-Palembang 2018	Did not participate							
(China) Hangzhou 2022	Did not participate							
(Japan) Aichi-Nagoya 2026	To be determined							
(Qatar) Doha 2030	To be determined							
(Saudi Arabia) Riyadh 2034	To be determined							
Total	Quarterfinals	3/9	13	4	4	5	20	16

=== WAFF U-23 Championship ===
WAFF U-23 Championship Record
Hosts/Year	Result	Position	GP	W	D	L	GS	GA
(Qatar) 2015	Group stage	8th	3	1	0	2	4	4
(Saudi Arabia) 2021	Champions	1st	5	4	0	1	12	6
(Saudi Arabia) 2022	Did not participate							
(Iraq) 2023	Semi-finals	4th	3	1	2	0	4	3
(Saudi Arabia) 2024	Group stage	5th	3	2	1	0	7	3
(Oman) 2025	Runners-up	2nd	3	2	0	1	4	3
Total	Champions	4/5	14	8	3	3	27	16

=== International cups/friendly tournaments ===
- 2008 Norway - Middle East U21 National Team Tournament (second place)
- 2012 Palestine International Cup (group stage)
- 2014 Palestine International Championship (second place)

== Head-to-head record ==
The following table shows Jordan's head-to-head record in the AFC U-23 Asian Cup.

Opponent	Pld	W	D	L	GF	GA	GD	Win %
Australia	3	0	2	1	0	1	−1	0.00
Indonesia	1	0	0	1	1	4	−3	0.00
Iraq	2	0	1	1	1	2	−1	0.00
Kuwait	1	1	0	0	1	0	+1	100.00
Japan	1	0	1	0	1	1	+0	0.00
Kyrgyzstan	1	1	0	0	1	0	+1	100.00
Malaysia	1	0	1	0	1	1	+0	0.00
Myanmar	1	1	0	0	6	1	+5	100.00
North Korea	1	1	0	0	2	1	+1	100.00
Oman	1	1	0	0	1	0	+1	100.00
Qatar	1	0	0	1	1	2	−1	0.00
Saudi Arabia	3	1	1	1	6	7	−1	33.33
South Korea	4	0	2	2	2	4	−2	0.00
United Arab Emirates	3	1	2	0	2	1	+1	33.33
Vietnam	3	1	1	1	3	3	+0	33.33
Total	27	8	11	8	29	28	+1	29.63

== See also ==
- Jordan national football team
- Jordan national under-20 football team
- Jordan national under-17 football team
- Jordan women's national football team
