= Abdallah Al-Mnayyes =

Jordanian footballer

Abdallah Al-Manayseh
Personal information
- Full name: Abdallah Abdul-Hafeth Yousef Al-Manayseh
- Date of birth: 17 June 2005 (age 21)
- Place of birth: Ar-Ramtha, Jordan
- Height: 1.80 m (5 ft 11 in)
- Position: Right-back

Team information
- Current team: Al-Ramtha
- Number: 23

Youth career
- –2023: Al-Ramtha

Senior career*
Years	Team	Apps	(Gls)
2023–	Al-Ramtha		

International career^{‡}
2023–	Jordan U20	7	(0)
2025–	Jordan U23	4	(1)
- * Club domestic league appearances and goals as of 25 January 2026 ‡ National team caps and goals as of 16 January 2026

Abdallah Abdul-Hafeth Yousef Al-Manayseh (Arabic: عبدالله المنايصة; born 17 June 2005) is a Jordanian professional footballer who plays as a Right-back for Jordanian Pro League club Al-Ramtha.

== Club career ==
=== Al-Ramtha ===
Upon the conclusion of the 2024–25 Jordanian Pro League season, Al-Ramtha revealed that Amman-based clubs inquired about Al-Manayseh and Moamen Al-Saket to join their teams for the following season as promising options for their clubs, to which the negotiations were ultimately unsuccessful.

== International career ==
Al-Manayseh began his international career as a Jordan U-20 player, and helped the national team qualify to the 2025 AFC U-20 Asian Cup.

On 15 May 2025, Al-Manayseh was called up to the Jordan U23 team for a training camp held in Tunisia. Al-Manayseh scored his only goal with the Jordan U23 team during an 11–0 victory over Bhutan during 2026 AFC U-23 Asian Cup qualification. On 23 December 2025, Al-Manayseh was called up to the 2026 AFC U-23 Asian Cup, participating in all three group stage matches.

== Playing style ==
Al-Manayseh admires Jordanian international full-back Ihsan Haddad as a "great and hardworking player," and aims to surpass him in the future.
