= Mohammad Qasem (footballer, born 2006) =

Jordanian footballer (born 2006)

Personal information
- Full name: Mohammad Ibrahim Qasem
- Date of birth: 6 February 2006 (age 20)
- Place of birth: Jordan
- Position: Striker

Team information
- Current team: Al-Faisaly
- Number: 95

Youth career
- Marmar Sports Academy
- Sahab
- Al-Faisaly

Senior career*
Years	Team	Apps	(Gls)
2026–	Al-Faisaly	11	(3)

International career^{‡}
2021	Jordan U15		
2026–	Jordan U23	2	(1)
- * Club domestic league appearances and goals as of 8 May 2026 ‡ National team caps and goals as of 30 March 2026

Mohammad Ibrahim Qasem (Arabic: محمد ابراهيم قاسم; born 8 September 2005), also known as Hammadi (Arabic: حمادي), is a Jordanian professional footballer who plays as a striker for Jordanian Pro League club Al-Faisaly.

== Club career ==
=== Early career ===
During his youth days, Qasem played at Amman's Marmar Sports Academy and Sahab, before joining Al-Faisaly's under-19 squad.

=== Al-Faisaly ===
Qasem would make his club debut for Al-Faisaly on 23 January 2026 with a one-minute cameo against Al-Salt. He would emerge that season when on 20 February, he registered two goals and an assist for the club against Al-Baqa'a. He then scored another goal the following week against Al-Sarhan. That game, however, caused him to suffer from a minor ankle injury and was forced to get sidelined.

== International career ==
Qasem is a youth international for Jordan, beginning his international career with the Jordan national under-15 football team in 2021.

After his positive run at club level in early 2026, Qasem was rewarded with a call-up to the Jordan under-23 team. He scored a goal on his debut against Kyrgyzstan. He was then forced to get subbed off against Russia when he suffered from a knee injury.
