= Ayham Al-Samamreh =

Jordanian footballer

Personal information
- Full name: Ayham Zeyad Ayed Al-Samamreh
- Date of birth: 9 May 2006 (age 20)
- Place of birth: Amman, Jordan
- Height: 1.81 m (5 ft 11 in)
- Position: Center-back

Team information
- Current team: Al-Wehdat
- Number: 5

Youth career
- 2015–2019: Jordan Knights
- 2019–2025: Al-Wehdat

Senior career*
Years	Team	Apps	(Gls)
2025–	Al-Wehdat	8	(0)

International career^{‡}
2022	Jordan U17	4	(0)
2024–2025	Jordan U20	8	(0)
2025–	Jordan U23	6	(1)
- * Club domestic league appearances and goals as of 8 May 2026 ‡ National team caps and goals as of 16 January 2026

Ayham Zeyad Ayed Al-Samamreh (Arabic: أيهم السمامرة; born 9 May 2006) is a Jordanian professional footballer who plays as a center-back for Jordanian Pro League side Al-Wehdat.

== Club career ==
=== Early career ===
Al-Samamreh began his career at Jordan Knights, before joining Al-Wehdat on an initial three-year contract.

=== Al-Wehdat ===
He began his senior career with Al-Wehdat during the 2025-26 Jordanian Pro League season.

After receiving limited minutes at Al-Wehdat, Al-Jazeera expressed their interest in obtaining Al-Samarneh on loan.

== International career ==
Al-Samamreh is a youth international for Jordan, having first represented the Jordanian under-17 team.

On 10 April 2024, Al-Samarneh was called up to the under-23 to participate in the 2024 AFC U-23 Asian Cup held in Qatar.

On 16 March 2025, Al-Samamreh was called up to the Jordan U-23 team for the 2025 WAFF U-23 Championship held in Oman. Al-Samarneh scored his only goal with the Jordan U23 team during an 11–0 victory over Bhutan during 2026 AFC U-23 Asian Cup qualification. On 23 December 2025, Al-Samamreh was called up to the 2026 AFC U-23 Asian Cup, participating in one match against Kyrgyzstan.
