= Bao Shengxin =

Chinese footballer

Personal information
- Full name: Bao Shengxin
- Date of birth: 1 August 2003 (age 23)
- Place of birth: Jinhua, Zhejiang, China
- Height: 1.76 m (5 ft 9 in)
- Position: Defensive midfielder

Team information
- Current team: Zhejiang FC
- Number: 6

Youth career
- –2022: Zhejiang FC

Senior career*
Years	Team	Apps	(Gls)
2022–	Zhejiang FC	17	(0)
2023	→ Shanghai Jiading Huilong (loan)	17	(2)
2024	→ Shanghai Jiading Huilong (loan)	24	(2)

International career^{‡}
2022–2023	China U20	7	(0)
2024–2026	China U23	11	(1)
Medal record
Men's football
Representing China
AFC U-23 Asian Cup
Runner-up	2026 Saudi Arabia	Team
- * Club domestic league appearances and goals as of 19 November 2026 ‡ National team caps and goals as of 17 January 2026

Bao Shengxin (Chinese: 鲍盛鑫; born 1 August 2003) is a Chinese professional footballer who plays as a midfielder for Chinese Super League club Zhejiang FC and the China national under-23 team.

== Early life and youth career ==
Bao was born in Jinhua, Zhejiang. He began playing football in the third grade at Jiangbin Primary School in Jinhua, where he was discovered by school coach Zhou Xiaowei during a break-time exercise session. He quickly demonstrated talent and became the school's top scorer, helping Jiangbin Primary School win the Zhejiang Campus Football League championship.

In 2015, Bao joined the youth academy of Hangzhou Greentown and progressed through the club's youth system, becoming captain of the U18 squad.

== Club career ==
=== Zhejiang FC ===
Bao was promoted to the Zhejiang FC first team following the 2021 National Games of China. He made his Chinese Super League debut on 8 November 2022 in a 5–1 victory over Guangzhou FC.

=== Loans to Shanghai Jiading Huilong ===
In July 2023, Bao was loaned to China League One club Shanghai Jiading Huilong to gain more playing experience. During his loan spell, he made 41 appearances and scored 4 goals with 3 assists. He was named China League One Young Player of the Month for September 2023 after scoring one goal and providing one assist in four matches, and creating 10 chances. In April 2024, he received the same honor after scoring two goals in five matches. His performances helped Shanghai Jiading Huilong achieve their best-ever league position.

=== Return to Zhejiang FC ===
Bao returned to Zhejiang FC in December 2024 after his successful loan spell. On 8 August 2025, the club announced that Bao had signed a contract extension through the 2028 season.

In the 2025 season, Bao suffered a fracture of the fifth metatarsal in his left foot, sustained in a match in April.

== International career ==
In 2023, he was part of the China U20 squad that reached the quarter-finals of the 2023 AFC U-20 Asian Cup.

On 4 December 2025, he was selected for the China U22 national team training camp in preparation for the 2026 AFC U-23 Asian Cup. On 4 January 2026, Bao was named in China's 23-man squad for the 2026 AFC U-23 Asian Cup held in Saudi Arabia, wearing the number 21 shirt.

== Style of play ==
Bao is primarily a holding midfielder known for his all-round abilities. He excels at reading the game, organizing attacks from deep positions, and possesses strong defensive capabilities with a tenacious work rate. He is also noted for his excellent passing range and set-piece abilities.

== Honours ==
China U23

- AFC U-23 Asian Cup runner-up: 2026
