= Peng Xiao =

Chinese footballer (born 2005)

Personal information
- Full name: Peng Xiao
- Date of birth: 28 July 2005 (age 21)
- Place of birth: Zhumadian, Henan, China
- Height: 1.90 m (6 ft 3 in)
- Position: Centre-back

Team information
- Current team: Shandong Taishan
- Number: 3

Youth career
- 2017–2023: Shandong Taishan

Senior career*
Years	Team	Apps	(Gls)
2024–2025	Shandong Taishan B	38	(9)
2025–	Shandong Taishan	37	(0)

International career^{‡}
2023–2025	China U20	7	(0)
2025–	China U23	6	(2)
Medal record
Men's football
Representing China
AFC U-23 Asian Cup
Runner-up	2026 Saudi Arabia	Team
Asian Games
Bronze medal – third place	2026 Aichi–Nagoya	Team
- * Club domestic league appearances and goals as of 19 November 2026 ‡ National team caps and goals as of 12 January 2026

Peng Xiao (Chinese: 彭啸; pinyin: Péng Xiào; born 28 July 2005) is a Chinese professional footballer who plays as a centre-back for Chinese Super League club Shandong Taishan.

== Career ==
Peng Xiao came from the Shandong Taishan youth training system. Starting in 2024, he represented Shandong Taishan B team in the Chinese Football Association League Two (CL2) and showed the attributes of a goal-scoring defender. He made 38 appearances and scored 9 goals in the 2024 and 2025 CL2 seasons. He was also named the 2025 CL2 Best Young Player.

On 19 July 2025, Peng Xiao made his debut for Shandong Taishan in a 2–0 away defeat to league opposition Dalian Yingbo.

== Career statistics ==
As of 12 January 2026

Club	Season	League			Cup		Continental		Other		Total	
Club	Season	Division	Apps	Goals	Apps	Goals	Apps	Goals	Apps	Goals	Apps	Goals
Shandong Taishan B	2024	China League Two	24	3	–		–		–		24	3
Shandong Taishan B	2025	China League Two	14	6	–		–		–		14	6
Shandong Taishan B	Total		38	9	0	0	0	0	0	0	38	9
Shandong Taishan	2025	Chinese Super League	34	1	0	0	0 (Note: Appearances in AFC Champions League Elite)	0	–		34	1
Career total			49	9	0	0	0	0	0	0	49	9

China U23

- AFC U-23 Asian Cup runner-up: 2026
