= Chen Zeshi =

Chinese association football player

Personal information
- Date of birth: 21 February 2005 (age 21)
- Place of birth: Pingxiang, Jiangxi, China
- Height: 1.80 m (5 ft 11 in)
- Position: Midfielder

Team information
- Current team: Shandong Taishan
- Number: 37

Youth career
- 2017–2021: Shandong Luneng

Senior career*
Years	Team	Apps	(Gls)
2021–	Shandong Taishan	22	(1)
2024–	Shandong Taishan B	34	(4)

International career^{‡}
2024–2025	China U20	13	(1)
2025–	China U23	11	(0)
Medal record
Representing China
AFC U-23 Asian Cup
Runner-up	2026 Saudi Arabia	Team
Asian Games
Bronze medal – third place	2026 Aichi–Nagoya	Team
- * Club domestic league appearances and goals as of 19 November 2026 ‡ National team caps and goals as of 31 January 2023

Chen Zeshi (Chinese: 陈泽仕; born 21 February 2005) is a Chinese footballer currently playing as a midfielder for Shandong Taishan in the Chinese Super League.

== Career ==
Chen started his career with Shandong Luneng (now renamed Shandong Taishan) and was promoted to their senior team during the 2021 Chinese Super League season. Chen made his debut in a Chinese FA Cup game on 18 December 2021 in a game against Qingdao Youth Island that ended in a 3-0 victory at the age of 16 years old and 239 days. He would go on to part of the squad that won the 2021 Chinese FA Cup and 2021 Chinese Super League title. This would be followed up by him winning the 2022 Chinese FA Cup with them the next season.

== Career statistics ==
As of match played 1 January 2026.

Appearances and goals by club, season and competition
Club	Season	League			National Cup		Continental		Other		Total	
Club	Season	Division	Apps	Goals	Apps	Goals	Apps	Goals	Apps	Goals	Apps	Goals
Shandong Taishan	2021	Chinese Super League	0	0	2	0	-		-		2	0
Shandong Taishan	2022	Chinese Super League	2	0	0	0	0	0	-		2	0
Shandong Taishan	2023	Chinese Super League	1	0	0	0	0	0	-		1	0
Shandong Taishan	2025	Chinese Super League	1	0	0	0	-		-		1	0
Shandong Taishan	Total		4	0	2	0	0	0	0	0	6	0
Shandong Taishan B	2024	China League Two	23	3	-		-		-		23	3
Shandong Taishan B	2025	China League Two	8	1	-		-		-		8	1
Shandong Taishan B	Total		31	4	0	0	0	0	0	0	31	4
Career total			35	4	2	0	0	0	0	0	37	4

== Honours ==
=== Club ===
Shandong Taishan

- Chinese FA Cup: 2021

=== International ===
China U23

- AFC U-23 Asian Cup runner-up: 2026
