= Brian Nwadike =

Japanese footballer (born 2005)

Personal information
- Full name: Uche Brian Seo Nwadike
- Date of birth: July 7, 2005 (age 21)
- Place of birth: Edogawa, Tokyo, Japan
- Height: 1.91 m (6 ft 3 in)
- Position: Centre-forward

Team information
- Current team: AaB
- Number: 19

Youth career
- 2018–2021: FC Tokyo U-15 Fukagawa
- 2021–2024: Shutoku High School

College career
Years	Team	Apps	(Gls)
2024–2026	Toin University of Yokohama		

Senior career*
Years	Team	Apps	(Gls)
2026–	AaB	8	(1)

International career^{‡}
2026	Japan U21	1	(2)
2026–	Japan U23	12	(3)
Medal record
Men's football
Representing Japan
AFC U-23 Asian Cup
Winner	2026 Saudi Arabia
Asian Games
Silver medal – second place	2026 Aichi–Nagoya
- * Club domestic league appearances and goals as of 20 September 2026 ‡ National team caps and goals as of 3 October 2026

Uche Brian Seo Nwadike (ンワディケ・ウチェ・ブライアン世雄, Nwadike Uche Brian Seo; born July 7, 2005) is a Japanese professional footballer who plays as a centre-forward for AaB.

== Club career ==
Nwadike progressed through FC Tokyo's youth academy, U-15 Fukagawa, then attended Shutoku High School and Toin University of Yokohama. In February 2026, he participated in a trial with AaB, a team in the Danish 1st Division, and after making a good impression, in May, AaB announced that they had signed him on a four-year contract.

== International career ==
Nwadike was born to a Nigerian father and a Japanese mother, which made him eligible to represent Nigeria and Japan at an international level.

Nwadike was part of the Japan U23 squad that won the 2026 AFC U-23 Asian Cup. He was also part of the Japan U23 squad that won the silver medal at the 2026 Asian Games.

== Personal life ==
Nwadike attended an international school during his elementary school years and has English conversational communications skills. This influenced him to have a strong desire to go abroad, in which he had the experience to participate in training with a Danish club during the summer of his third year of high school.

At the beginning of his third year of junior high school, while playing for FC Tokyo U-15 Fukagawa, Nwadike was diagnosed with spondylolisthesis and had to temporarily stop playing. When he entered high school, he played with his lumbar spine fixed with bolts. and when he underwent surgery to remove the bolts, he struggled with the discrepancy between his body and his image of the game.

== Career statistics ==
As of match played 15 September 2026

Appearances and goals by club, season and competition
Club	Season	League			Cup		Continental		Other		Total	
Club	Season	Division	Apps	Goals	Apps	Goals	Apps	Goals	Apps	Goals	Apps	Goals
AaB	2026–27	Danish Superliga	8	1	2	3	—		—		10	4
Career total			8	1	2	3	0	0	0	0	10	4

== Honours ==
Japan U23

- AFC U-23 Asian Cup: 2026
- Asian Games silver medal: 2026
