= Mohammad Al-Shatti =

Jordanian footballer (born 2006)

Personal information
- Full name: Mohammad Al-Shatti
- Date of birth: 30 November 2006 (age 19)
- Place of birth: Amman, Jordan
- Position: Right back

Team information
- Current team: Al-Ahli
- Number: 4

Youth career
- –2025: Al-Ahli

Senior career*
Years	Team	Apps	(Gls)
2025–	Al-Ahli	9	(1)

International career^{‡}
2025–	Jordan U23	1	(0)
- * Club domestic league appearances and goals as of 25 January 2026 ‡ National team caps and goals as of 16 January 2026

Mohammad Al-Shatti (Arabic: محمد الشطي; born 30 November 2006) is a Jordanian professional footballer who plays as a right back for Jordanian Pro League club Al-Ahli.

== Club career ==
=== Al-Ahli ===
On 2 February 2025, Al-Shatti signed his first professional contract at Al-Ahli. He made his professional league debut at the club on the last matchday of the 2024–25 Jordanian Pro League against Al-Sareeh. He scored his first goal during the opening campaign of the 2025–26 Jordanian Pro League season, in a 5–2 loss to Al-Hussein.

== International career ==
On 24 August 2025, Al-Shatti was called up to the Jordanian under-23 team to participate in two friendlies against Bahrain, as well as to participate in 2026 AFC U-23 Asian Cup qualification matches.

On 23 December 2025, Al-Shatti was called up to the 2026 AFC U-23 Asian Cup, where he made his sole appearance in the competition against Japan.
