= Moamen Al-Saket =

Jordanian footballer

Personal information
- Full name: Moamen Al-Saket
- Date of birth: 8 July 2005 (age 21)
- Place of birth: Jordan
- Height: 1.76 m (5 ft 9 in)
- Position: Left winger

Team information
- Current team: Al-Hussein (on loan from Al-Ramtha)
- Number: 70

Youth career
- –2023: Al-Ramtha

Senior career*
Years	Team	Apps	(Gls)
2023–	Al-Ramtha		
2026–	→ Al-Hussein (loan)	0	(0)

International career^{‡}
2023–2025	Jordan U20	4	(0)
2025–	Jordan U23	7	(3)
- * Club domestic league appearances and goals as of 25 January 2026 ‡ National team caps and goals as of 16 January 2026

Moamen Al-Saket (Arabic: مؤمن الساكت; born 8 July 2005) is a Jordanian professional footballer who plays as a left-winger for Jordanian Pro League club Al-Hussein, on loan from Al-Ramtha.

== Club career ==
=== Early career ===
Born in Jordan, Al-Saket began his career at Al-Ramtha.

=== Al-Ramtha ===
He made his senior debut for the club during the 2023 Jordan Shield Cup.

During the 2024–25 Jordanian Pro League season, Al-Saket was noted for having stepped up for Al-Ramtha during the departure of Ali Al-Azaizeh to Bahrain, scoring three goals in the campaign.

By the halfway point of the 2025–26 Jordanian Pro League season, Al-Saket found himself among the league's top-scorer race with four goals.

== International career ==
Al-Saket began his international career as a Jordan under-20 player.

On 15 May 2025, Al-Saket was called up to the Jordan U23 team for a training camp held in Tunisia. On 23 December 2025, Al-Saket was called up to the 2026 AFC U-23 Asian Cup, participating in all four matches.
