= Salameh Salman =

Jordanian footballer (born 2003)

Personal information
- Full name: Salameh Ali Salameh Salman
- Date of birth: 7 May 2005 (age 21)
- Place of birth: Amman, Jordan
- Height: 1.87 m (6 ft 2 in)
- Position: Goalkeeper

Team information
- Current team: Shabab Al-Ordon
- Number: 99

Youth career
- –2021: Shabab Al-Ordon

Senior career*
Years	Team	Apps	(Gls)
2021–	Shabab Al-Ordon		

International career^{‡}
2024–2025	Jordan U20	18	(0)
- * Club domestic league appearances and goals as of 28 January 2026 ‡ National team caps and goals as of 19 February 2025

Salameh Ali Salameh Salman (Arabic: سلامة سلمان; born 12 April 2003) is a Jordanian professional footballer who plays as a goalkeeper for Jordanian Pro League club Shabab Al-Ordon.

== International career ==
Salman is a youth international for Jordan, beginning his international career with the Jordan national under-20 football team in 2023. He would participate in the 2024 WAFF U-19 Championship, where his team would reach the semi-finals. On 18 January 2025, he would get called up to the team for the U20 Challenge Series and the 2025 AFC U-20 Asian Cup.

On 16 March 2025, Salman was called up to the under-23 team for the 2025 WAFF U-23 Championship held in Oman. On 24 August 2025, he was called up once again to participate in two friendlies against Bahrain, as well as to participate in 2026 AFC U-23 Asian Cup qualification matches.

On 23 December 2025, Salman was called up to the 2026 AFC U-23 Asian Cup.
