= Saleh Fraij =

Jordanian footballer

Personal information
- Full name: Saleh Mohammad Salman Fraij
- Date of birth: 3 November 2006 (age 20)
- Place of birth: Sahab, Jordan
- Height: 1.83 m (6 ft 0 in)
- Position: Defensive midfielder

Team information
- Current team: Al-Salt (on loan from Etihad)

Youth career
- –2024: Etihad
- 2024: Sahab
- 2025: Etihad

Senior career*
Years	Team	Apps	(Gls)
2024	Sahab		
2025–	Etihad		
2026	→Al-Baqa'a (loan)	15	(0)
2026–	→Al-Salt (loan)	0	(0)

International career^{‡}
2022	Jordan U17	4	(0)
2024–2025	Jordan U20	9	(0)
2025–	Jordan U23	3	(1)
- * Club domestic league appearances and goals as of 7 May 2026 ‡ National team caps and goals as of 30 March 2026

Saleh Mohammad Salman Fraij (Arabic: صالح فريج; born 3 November 2006) is a Jordanian footballer who plays as a defensive midfielder for Jordanian Pro League club Al-Salt, on loan from Etihad.

== Club career ==
=== Early career ===
Born in Sahab, Fraij began his career at Etihad and standing out through the club's ranks.

=== Sahab ===
Fraij joined Jordanian First Division League club Sahab for the 2024–25 season, as well as their under-19 squad.

=== Etihad ===
Fraij returned to Etihad for the 2025 Jordanian Third Division League season, and registered a goal in the club's 1–0 victory over Aqaba Sons Union Club at the round of 32.

==== Al-Baqa'a (loan) ====
On 19 January 2026, Fraij joined Jordanian Pro League club Al-Baqa'a for the remainder of the season.

== International career ==
Fraij began his international career as a Jordan under-17 player. He scored the winning goal of the 2022 WAFF U-16 Championship final against Lebanon.

Fraij also represented the under-20 in 2023, where he participated in a youth camp between October 8 and 17, in the Turkish city of Antalya. On 18 January 2025, he would get called up to the team for the U20 Challenge Series and the 2025 AFC U-20 Asian Cup.

On 15 May 2025, Fraij was called up to the Jordan Jordan under-23 team for a training camp held in Tunisia. On 23 December 2025, Fraij was called up to the 2026 AFC U-23 Asian Cup, participating in two of the four matches.
