= Anas Al-Khob =

Jordanian footballer

Personal information
- Full name: Anas Ashraf Mohammad Al-Khob
- Date of birth: 1 February 2006 (age 20)
- Place of birth: Aydoun, Jordan
- Height: 1.73 m (5 ft 8 in)
- Position: Right winger

Team information
- Current team: Al-Faisaly
- Number: 13

Youth career
- –2024: Al-Faisaly

Senior career*
Years	Team	Apps	(Gls)
2024–	Al-Faisaly	14	(1)

International career^{‡}
2022	Jordan U17		
2024–	Jordan U20	9	(1)
2025–	Jordan U23	7	(0)
- * Club domestic league appearances and goals as of 8 May 2026 ‡ National team caps and goals as of 16 January 2026

Anas Ashraf Mohammad Al-Khob (Arabic: أنس الخب; born 1 February 2006) is a Jordanian professional footballer who plays as a right-winger for Jordanian Pro League club Al-Faisaly and Jordan U-23.

== Club career ==
=== Al-Faisaly ===
Al-Khob began his career at Al-Faisaly.

Al-Khob found himself unused during the first half of the 2025–26 Jordanian Pro League season. However, on 23 January 2026, Al-Khob was rotated in against Al-Salt, where he forced a penalty to go his way, for Ahmad Ersan to convert the winning goal.

== International career ==
Al-Khob began his international career as a Jordan under-17 player.

He was then a part of the Jordan under-20 team, having participated in the 2024 WAFF U-19 Championship and qualifiers.

On 15 May 2025, Al-Khob was called up to the Jordan under-23 team for the 2025 WAFF U-23 Championship held in Oman. On 23 December 2025, Kalbouneh was called up to the 2026 AFC U-23 Asian Cup, participating in all four matches and providing an assist against Kyrgyzstan.
