= Mohammad Abu Ghoush =

Jordanian footballer

Personal information
- Full name: Mohammad Ahmed Mohammad Taha
- Date of birth: 13 July 2005 (age 21)
- Place of birth: Amman, Jordan
- Height: 1.82 m (6 ft 0 in)
- Position: Left-back

Team information
- Current team: Shabab Al-Ordon
- Number: 19

Youth career
- –2024: Shabab Al-Ordon

Senior career*
Years	Team	Apps	(Gls)
2024–	Shabab Al-Ordon	28	(4)
2026	→ Al-Hussein (loan)	15	(1)

International career^{‡}
2024–2025	Jordan U20	10	(1)
2024–	Jordan U23	10	(0)
2026–	Jordan	2	(0)
- * Club domestic league appearances and goals as of 8 May 2026 ‡ National team caps and goals as of 30 March 2026

Mohammad Ahmed Mohammad Taha (Arabic: محمد أحمد محمد طه; born 13 July 2005), also known as Mohammad Abu Ghoush (Arabic: محمد أبو غوش), is a Jordanian professional footballer who plays as a left back for Jordanian Pro League club Shabab Al-Ordon and the Jordan national team.

== Club career ==
=== Early career ===
Born in Jordan, Abu Ghoush began his career at Shabab Al-Ordon.

=== Shabab Al-Ordon ===
He made his senior debut for the club against Al-Salt, where he registered an assist on a 2–1 defeat. He would go on to finish his debut season with a goal and four assists in 18 matches.

With his first season wrapped up, interest from Al-Faisaly grew and inquired Shabab Al-Ordon about Abu Ghoush, to which Salim Khair, the president of Shabab Al-Ordon, confirmed that Abu Ghoush would remain at the club for the following season.

==== Al-Hussein (loan) ====
On 20 January 2025, Abu Ghoush joined Al-Hussein on loan from Shabab Al-Ordon for the remainder of the 2025–26 Jordanian Pro League season.

== International career ==
Abu Ghoush began his international career in June 2024 as a Jordan under-20 player, participating in the 2024 WAFF U-19 Championship. On 16 March 2025, Abu Ghoush was called up to the Jordan under-23 team for the 2025 WAFF U-23 Championship held in Oman. On 23 December 2025, Abu Ghoush was called up to the 2026 AFC U-23 Asian Cup, where he participated in three of the four matches. Abu Ghoush contributed to an assist to Ali Azaizeh's first goal against Saudi Arabia.

On 19 March 2026, Abu Ghoush received his first senior international call-up ahead of the matches against Nigeria and Costa Rica, held in Antalya. Later that year, on 8 June, he was called up for the 2026 FIFA World Cup, replacing the injured Ibrahim Sabra.

== Playing style ==
Abu Ghoush is seen as an offensively impactful left-back, where he contributed to five goal contributions for Shabab Al-Ordon during the 2025–26 Jordanian Pro League season, before departing on loan to Al-Hussein.
