= 2025 AFC U-20 Asian Cup squads =

International football tournament in China

The 2025 AFC U-20 Asian Cup was an international football tournament that was held in China from 12 February to 1 March 2025. The sixteen participating national teams were required to register a squad of a minimum of 18 and a maximum of 23 players, including at least three goalkeepers (Regulations Article 26.3). Only players in these squads are eligible to take part in the tournament. The tournament exclusively required players to be born between 1 January 2005 and 31 December 2009 to be eligible (Regulations Article 22.1), that is, they must be a maximum of 20 years old and at least 16 years old by the end of the calendar year in which the competition is played.

Each participating national team had to submit a provisional list of a minimum of 18 and a maximum of 50 players (including at least four goalkeepers) to the Asian Football Confederation (AFC), via the AFC Administration System (AFCAS), no later than thirty days prior to its first match of the competition. Up to 5 players could be replaced or added to the provisional list, for any reason, provided that the maximum number of registered players (50) is not exceeded no later than ten days prior to its first match of the competition (Regulations Article 25). The final list of up to 23 players per national team had to be submitted to AFC, via AFCAS, by latest ten days prior to the first match of the tournament. All players in the final list had to be chosen from the respective provisional list. The AFC announced the final lists on 8 February 2025. Teams are permitted to replace any player up to 24 hours prior to their first match of the competition. The replacement player must come from the provisional list and will be assigned the shirt number of the replaced player (Regulations Article 26.2).

The age listed for each player is on 12 February 2025, the first day of the tournament. A flag is included for coaches who are of a different nationality than their own national team. Players name marked in bold have been capped at full international level.

== Group A ==
=== Australia ===
The final squad was announced on 24 January 2025.

Head coach: Trevor Morgan

No.	Pos.	Player	Date of birth (age)	Caps	Goals	Club
1	GK	Steven Hall	16 January 2005 (aged 20)	5	0	(The Football Association) Brighton & Hove Albion
2	DF	Joshua Inserra	21 January 2005 (aged 20)	7	0	(Football Australia) Melbourne Victory
3	DF	Sebastian Esposito	21 April 2005 (aged 19)	6	0	(Italian Football Federation) Lecce
4	DF	Panagiotis Kikianis	8 March 2005 (aged 19)	3	2	(Football Australia) Adelaide United
5	DF	Fabian Talladira	4 February 2006 (aged 19)	7	0	(Football Australia) Adelaide United
6	MF	Paul Okon-Engstler	24 January 2005 (aged 20)	7	0	(Portuguese Football Federation) Benfica
7	MF	Daniel Bennie	13 April 2006 (aged 18)	4	1	(The Football Association) Queens Park Rangers
8	MF	Jonny Yull	5 March 2005 (aged 19)	8	2	(Football Australia) Adelaide United
9	FW	Luka Jovanovic	20 May 2005 (aged 19)	11	4	(Football Australia) Adelaide United
10	MF	Alexander Badolato	23 February 2005 (aged 19)	16	4	(Football Australia) Western Sydney Wanderers
11	FW	Tiago Quintal	16 June 2006 (aged 18)	6	0	(Football Australia) Sydney FC
12	GK	Alexander Robinson	9 March 2005 (aged 19)	5	0	(Football Australia) Macarthur FC
13	DF	Lucas Herrington	6 March 2007 (aged 17)	0	0	(Football Australia) Brisbane Roar
14	DF	Zach Lisolajski	5 October 2005 (aged 19)	6	0	(Football Australia) Perth Glory
15	MF	Jaylan Pearman	18 April 2006 (aged 18)	2	1	(Football Australia) Perth Glory
16	MF	Oliver Randazzo	12 October 2006 (aged 18)	4	0	(Football Australia) Macarthur FC
17	MF	Frans Deli	8 June 2005 (aged 19)	10	0	(Football Australia) Macarthur FC
18	GK	Gus Hoefsloot	13 March 2006 (aged 18)	0	0	(Football Australia) Sydney FC
19	FW	Musa Touré	12 November 2005 (aged 19)	2	1	(Danish Football Association) Randers
20	MF	Louis Agosti	2 March 2005 (aged 19)	4	0	(Italian Football Federation) Perugia
21	FW	Dean Bosnjak	11 October 2006 (aged 18)	1	1	(Football Australia) Macarthur FC
22	FW	Medin Memeti	20 July 2007 (aged 17)	1	0	(Football Australia) Melbourne City
23	MF	Adam Bugarija	22 February 2005 (aged 19)	3	1	(Football Australia) Perth Glory

=== China ===
A 28-player provisional squad was announced on 3 January 2025. On 13 January 2025, the team called up goalkeeper Zhang Haoran. On 24 January 2025, it was reported that Tang Tianyi has left the camp, in replacement for Sun Kangbo. On 8 February 2025, the AFC released the final lists for all teams, including China. The following day, in China's official squad announcement, Yuan Jianrui was replaced by Zhang Haoran due to illness.

Head coach: (Serbia) Dejan Đurđević

No.	Pos.	Player	Date of birth (age)	Club
1	GK	Liu Qiwei	21 December 2005 (aged 19)	(Chinese Football Association) Shandong Taishan
2	DF	Xu Junchi	9 January 2005 (aged 20)	(Chinese Football Association) Zhejiang
3	DF	He Yiran	17 February 2005 (aged 19)	(Chinese Football Association) Changchun Yatai
4	DF	Shi Songchen	30 December 2005 (aged 19)	(Chinese Football Association) Shandong Taishan
5	DF	Peng Xiao	28 July 2005 (aged 19)	(Chinese Football Association) Shandong Taishan
6	MF	Imran Memet	3 May 2005 (aged 19)	(Chinese Football Association) Shandong Taishan
7	MF	Mao Weijie	28 May 2005 (aged 19)	(Chinese Football Association) Dalian Yingbo
8	MF	Chen Zeshi	21 February 2005 (aged 19)	(Chinese Football Association) Shandong Taishan
9	FW	**Liu Chengyu**	2 July 2006 (aged 18)	(Chinese Football Association) Shanghai Shenhua
10	MF	**Kuai Jiwen**	28 February 2006 (aged 18)	(Chinese Football Association) Shanghai Port
11	FW	**Wang Yudong**	23 November 2006 (aged 18)	(Chinese Football Association) Zhejiang
12	GK	Yao Haoyang	28 October 2006 (aged 18)	(Chinese Football Association) Chongqing Tonglianglong
13	MF	Xiong Jizheng	16 May 2005 (aged 19)	(Chinese Football Association) Wuhan Three Towns
14	MF	Wang Yifan	11 January 2005 (aged 20)	(Chinese Football Association) Shanghai Shenhua
15	FW	Wang Haobin	11 August 2006 (aged 18)	(Chinese Football Association) Shandong Taishan
16	MF	Zhang Zhixiong	27 September 2006 (aged 18)	(Chinese Football Association) Chongqing Tonglianglong
17	MF	Chen Shihan	21 May 2005 (aged 19)	(Royal Belgian Football Association) Union Rochefortoise
18	FW	Zhu Pengyu	9 May 2005 (aged 19)	(Chinese Football Association) Dalian Yingbo
19	DF	Qi Qiancheng	5 April 2006 (aged 18)	(Chinese Football Association) Shandong Taishan
20	DF	Sun Kangbo	19 August 2006 (aged 18)	(Football Association of Serbia) Voždovac
21	FW	Du Yuezheng	14 September 2005 (aged 19)	(Royal Spanish Football Federation) Marbella
22	GK	Zhang Haoran	18 July 2006 (aged 18)	(Chinese Football Association) Tianjin Jinmen Tiger
23	DF	Álex Yang	13 June 2005 (aged 19)	(Chinese Football Association) Qingdao West Coast

=== Kyrgyzstan ===
A 24-player provisional squad was announced on 4 February 2025. On 8 February 2025, the AFC released the final lists for all teams, including Kyrgyzstan.

Head coach: (Ukraine) Serhiy Puchkov

No.	Pos.	Player	Date of birth (age)	Club
1	GK	Aziret Ysmanaliev	24 October 2005 (aged 19)	(Kyrgyz Football Union) Ilbirs Bishkek
2	DF	Emirkhan Kydyrshaev	29 April 2005 (aged 19)	(Slovak Football Association) Trenčín
3	DF	Dastan Koldoshov	14 April 2005 (aged 19)	(Kyrgyz Football Union) Ilbirs Bishkek
4	DF	Ivan Nastaev	6 August 2005 (aged 19)	(Bulgarian Football Union) Septemvri Sofia
5	DF	Nazhibullokh Alizhanov	18 May 2005 (aged 19)	(Kyrgyz Football Union) Ilbirs Bishkek
6	DF	Atai Eshenkulov	19 February 2005 (aged 19)	(Kyrgyz Football Union) Ilbirs Bishkek
7	MF	Kairat Abdirasulov	17 June 2005 (aged 19)	(Kyrgyz Football Union) Ilbirs Bishkek
8	MF	Baibol Ermekov	8 September 2005 (aged 19)	(Kyrgyz Football Union) Ilbirs Bishkek
9	MF	Argen Emilbekov	15 January 2006 (aged 19)	(Kyrgyz Football Union) Dordoi Bishkek
10	FW	Umar Madaminov	12 April 2005 (aged 19)	(Kyrgyz Football Union) Ilbirs Bishkek
11	FW	Nurislam Oruntaev	6 February 2005 (aged 20)	(Kyrgyz Football Union) Dordoi Bishkek
12	MF	Emir Ernisov	16 February 2005 (aged 19)	(Kyrgyz Football Union) Talant
13	GK	Adilet Abdyraimov	9 September 2006 (aged 18)	(Kyrgyz Football Union) Dordoi Bishkek
14	MF	Nurtilek Moldaliev	23 September 2006 (aged 18)	(Kyrgyz Football Union) Muras United
15	FW	Daniel Omarov	29 March 2005 (aged 19)	(Kyrgyz Football Union) Ilbirs Bishkek
16	GK	Seitek Urustamov	9 July 2005 (aged 19)	(Kyrgyz Football Union) Ilbirs Bishkek
17	DF	Artem Istrashkin	26 March 2005 (aged 19)	(Kyrgyz Football Union) Ilbirs Bishkek
18	MF	Azamat Tashbaltaev	19 September 2005 (aged 19)	(Kyrgyz Football Union) Abdysh-Ata
19	FW	Yryskeldi Madanov	22 February 2006 (aged 18)	(Kyrgyz Football Union) Alay Osh
20	MF	Sardorbek Nematov	17 August 2005 (aged 19)	(Kyrgyz Football Union) Alay Osh
21	DF	Mukhtar Ishenaliev	19 March 2005 (aged 19)	(Portuguese Football Federation) Alba
22	DF	Adilet Dolotkeldiev	22 May 2005 (aged 19)	(Kyrgyz Football Union) Dordoi Bishkek
23	FW	**Beknaz Almazbekov**	23 June 2005 (aged 19)	(Football Federation of Kosovo) Llapi

=== Qatar ===
A 30-player provisional squad was announced on 3 January 2025. The final squad was announced on 6 February 2025.

Head coach: (Spain) Félix Sarriugarte

No.	Pos.	Player	Date of birth (age)	Club
1	GK	Abubaker Osman	25 September 2005 (aged 19)	(Royal Spanish Football Federation) Calahorra
2	DF	Ayoub Al-Oui	11 March 2005 (aged 19)	(Qatar Football Association) Al-Gharafa
3	DF	Motaman Mohamed	21 June 2005 (aged 19)	(Royal Spanish Football Federation) Cultural Leonesa
4	DF	Abdulla Al-Otaibi	15 April 2006 (aged 18)	(Qatar Football Association) Al Sadd
5	DF	Ali Shahabi	29 January 2006 (aged 19)	(Qatar Football Association) Al Ahli
6	MF	Bassam Adel Eid	25 September 2006 (aged 18)	(Royal Spanish Football Federation) Alcorcón
7	FW	**Tahsin Jamshid**	16 June 2006 (aged 18)	(Royal Spanish Football Federation) Alcorcón
8	MF	Moath Taha	12 October 2005 (aged 19)	(Royal Spanish Football Federation) Calahorra
9	FW	**Mohamed Khaled Gouda**	26 January 2005 (aged 20)	(Royal Spanish Football Federation) Calahorra
10	MF	**Ibrahim Al-Hassan**	26 October 2005 (aged 19)	(Royal Spanish Football Federation) Calahorra
11	DF	Younis Bala	5 January 2005 (aged 20)	(Royal Spanish Football Federation) Calahorra
12	DF	Fayiz Al-Farsi	13 September 2005 (aged 19)	(Qatar Football Association) Al-Wakrah
13	DF	Yousef Al-Nizami	16 April 2006 (aged 18)	(Royal Spanish Football Federation) Calahorra
14	FW	Jassem Al-Hamad	8 November 2006 (aged 18)	(Royal Spanish Football Federation) Calahorra
15	DF	Abdolaziz Jafari	14 January 2006 (aged 19)	(Qatar Football Association) Al-Duhail
16	FW	Mohamed Hani Faragalla	10 October 2005 (aged 19)	(Qatar Football Association) Al Sadd
17	FW	Noureldin Ibrahim	11 July 2007 (aged 17)	(Qatar Football Association) Al Ahli
18	MF	Awab Fadil	5 April 2006 (aged 18)	(Royal Spanish Football Federation) Calahorra
19	FW	Abdulaziz Al-Bakri	14 April 2005 (aged 19)	(Qatar Football Association) Umm Salal
20	MF	Ziad Fadi	3 July 2005 (aged 19)	(Royal Spanish Football Federation) Calahorra
21	GK	Mohamed Lengliz	9 March 2005 (aged 19)	(Qatar Football Association) Al Ahli
22	GK	Galal El-Sharkawy	26 February 2006 (aged 18)	(Royal Spanish Football Federation) Calahorra
23	FW	Nasser Babiker	26 August 2006 (aged 18)	(Qatar Football Association) Al Ahli

== Group B ==
=== Iraq ===
A 26-player provisional squad was announced on 19 January 2025. On 8 February 2025, the AFC released the final lists for all teams, including Iraq.

Head coach: Emad Mohammed

No.	Pos.	Player	Date of birth (age)	Caps	Goals	Club
1	GK	Layth Sajid	17 September 2005 (aged 19)	1	0	(Iraq Football Association) Al-Shorta
2	DF	Mohammed Ghalib	26 July 2005 (aged 19)	3	0	(Iraq Football Association) Al-Minaa
3	DF	Moussa Alaa	1 September 2005 (aged 19)	3	0	(Iraq Football Association) Al-Quwa Al-Jawiya
4	MF	Arez Abdullah	10 February 2005 (aged 20)	0	0	(Football Association of Finland) Honka
5	DF	Abbas Adnan Al-Mohammed	1 January 2005 (aged 20)	0	0	(Iraq Football Association) Al-Nasiriya
6	DF	Hussein Fahem	6 April 2006 (aged 18)	3	0	(Iraq Football Association) Al-Kahrabaa
7	MF	Hayder Hamad Abed	16 November 2005 (aged 19)	0	0	(Iraq Football Association) Al-Nasiriya
8	MF	Halgwrd Qays	3 January 2005 (aged 20)	3	0	(Iraq Football Association) Erbil
9	FW	Mustafa Qabeel	8 January 2005 (aged 20)	10	0	(Iraq Football Association) Erbil
10	MF	Amoori Faisal	1 May 2005 (aged 19)	5	2	(Iraq Football Association) Al-Kahrabaa
11	MF	Mustafa Nawaf	4 May 2005 (aged 19)	3	4	(Iraq Football Association) Duhok
12	GK	Wisam Ali	27 May 2005 (aged 19)	3	0	(Iraq Football Association) Naft Al-Wasat
13	DF	Hassan Emad	1 April 2005 (aged 19)	3	0	(Iraq Football Association) Duhok
14	FW	Zainulabdeen Al-Rubaye	5 August 2008 (aged 16)	0	0	(Iraq Football Association) Al-Minaa
15	MF	Ali Mokhalad	7 February 2006 (aged 19)	3	0	(Iraq Football Association) Al-Quwa Al-Jawiya
16	FW	Yasir Wisam Abboodi	3 March 2007 (aged 17)	0	0	(Iraq Football Association) Al-Zawraa
17	DF	Muslim Mousa	11 March 2005 (aged 19)	10	0	(Iraq Football Association) Al-Minaa
18	FW	Sidad Haji	1 January 2005 (aged 20)	3	2	(Iraq Football Association) Zakho
19	FW	Ahmed Jasim	8 February 2005 (aged 20)	3	1	(Iraq Football Association) Al-Naft
20	FW	Karrar Jaafar	29 July 2006 (aged 18)	3	4	(Iraq Football Association) Al-Minaa
21	MF	Layth Dheyaa	7 June 2005 (aged 19)	3	0	(Iraq Football Association) Al-Quwa Al-Jawiya
22	GK	Ammar Al-Hlaichi	2 January 2008 (aged 17)	0	0	(Iraq Football Association) Al-Minaa
23	FW	Aymen Luay	23 May 2005 (aged 19)	3	3	(Iraq Football Association) Al-Najaf

=== Jordan ===
The final squad was announced on 18 January 2025.

Head coach: (Netherlands) Peter Meindertsma

No.	Pos.	Player	Date of birth (age)	Club
1	GK	Salameh Salman	7 May 2005 (aged 19)	(Jordan Football Association) Shabab Al-Ordon
2	DF	Mohammad Abu Al-Sukkar	31 May 2005 (aged 19)	(Jordan Football Association) Al-Hussein
3	DF	Ayham Al-Samamreh	25 February 2006 (aged 18)	(Jordan Football Association) Al-Wehdat
4	DF	Omar Marar	7 February 2005 (aged 20)	(Jordan Football Association) Al-Faisaly
5	DF	Abdallah Al-Mnayyes	17 June 2005 (aged 19)	(Jordan Football Association) Al-Ramtha
6	DF	Youssef Al-Maqableh	23 March 2005 (aged 19)	(United Arab Emirates Football Association) Shabab Al-Ahli
7	FW	**Ibrahim Sabra**	1 February 2006 (aged 19)	(Jordan Football Association) Al-Wehdat
8	MF	Yanal Al-Mahmoud	27 March 2005 (aged 19)	(Jordan Football Association) Al-Arabi
9	FW	Odeh Al-Fakhouri	22 November 2005 (aged 19)	(Jordan Football Association) Al-Hussein
10	MF	Izz al-Din Abu Al-Saud	24 July 2005 (aged 19)	(Jordan Football Association) Al-Ahli
11	MF	Mahmoud Khrouba	8 September 2005 (aged 19)	(Jordan Football Association) Al-Sareeh
12	GK	Abdullah Al-Shaqran	9 March 2006 (aged 18)	(Jordan Football Association) Al-Ramtha
13	DF	Mohammad Abu Ghoush	13 July 2005 (aged 19)	(Jordan Football Association) Shabab Al-Ordon
14	MF	Yousef Qashi	15 May 2005 (aged 19)	(German Football Association) Wuppertaler SV
15	DF	Adnan Nofal	9 May 2005 (aged 19)	(Jordan Football Association) Amman FC
16	FW	Omar Ghanajoq	18 October 2005 (aged 19)	(Jordan Football Association) Al-Ahli
17	MF	Abdulrahman Khdour	1 May 2006 (aged 18)	(Jordan Football Association) Shabab Al-Aqaba
18	DF	Seif Taha	16 October 2007 (aged 17)	(French Football Federation) Paris Saint-Germain
19	MF	Anas Al-Khob	1 February 2006 (aged 19)	(Jordan Football Association) Al-Faisaly
20	MF	Moamen Al-Saket	8 July 2005 (aged 19)	(Jordan Football Association) Al-Ramtha
21	MF	Saleh Fraij	3 November 2006 (aged 18)	(Jordan Football Association) Sahab
22	GK	Mohammad Al-Taraira	15 February 2006 (aged 18)	(Jordan Football Association) Al-Wehdat
23	DF	Nouraldin Yaseen	9 January 2005 (aged 20)	(Jordan Football Association) Al-Wehdat

=== North Korea ===
The final squad was announced on 8 February 2025.

Head coach: Jon Chol

No.	Pos.	Player	Date of birth (age)	Club
1	GK	Hong Kil-ryong	1 July 2005 (aged 19)	(DPR Korea Football Association) Hwaebul
2	DF	Kim Jin-won	1 November 2006 (aged 18)	(DPR Korea Football Association) Pyongyang
3	DF	Han Jae-yong	15 January 2006 (aged 19)	(DPR Korea Football Association) Amnokgang
4	DF	Sung Hak-myong	1 February 2007 (aged 18)	(DPR Korea Football Association) Hwaebul
5	DF	Jong Un-hyok	6 January 2007 (aged 18)	(DPR Korea Football Association) Wolmido
6	MF	Choe Kuk-gon	22 January 2005 (aged 20)	(DPR Korea Football Association) Kigwancha
7	FW	Ri Jong-dok	9 February 2005 (aged 20)	(DPR Korea Football Association) Wolmido
8	MF	Kim Jin-song	10 March 2006 (aged 18)	(DPR Korea Football Association) Ryomyong
9	MF	Jong Su-hun	26 November 2005 (aged 19)	(DPR Korea Football Association) Rimyongsu
10	FW	Choe Kuk	21 March 2005 (aged 19)	(DPR Korea Football Association) Wolmido
11	FW	Ra Mu-ryong	20 September 2006 (aged 18)	(DPR Korea Football Association) April 25
12	MF	Kim Hyon-jun	4 January 2007 (aged 18)	(DPR Korea Football Association) Kigwancha
13	MF	Jang Myong-il	2 April 2005 (aged 19)	(DPR Korea Football Association) Sobaeksu
14	FW	Ho Myong-ryong	6 January 2007 (aged 18)	(DPR Korea Football Association) Kigwancha
15	MF	Rim Ryong	28 March 2007 (aged 17)	(DPR Korea Football Association) Ryomyong
16	DF	Kim Thae-ryong	4 January 2005 (aged 20)	(DPR Korea Football Association) Sobaeksu
17	MF	Kim Se-jin	15 January 2006 (aged 19)	(DPR Korea Football Association) Sobaeksu
18	GK	Kim Thae-jong	8 March 2006 (aged 18)	(DPR Korea Football Association) Amnokgang
19	MF	Yun Su-ung	19 September 2005 (aged 19)	(DPR Korea Football Association) April 25
20	MF	Pak Il-gwang	3 February 2005 (aged 20)	(DPR Korea Football Association) April 25
21	MF	Hong Paek-hyon	8 April 2005 (aged 19)	(DPR Korea Football Association) Kigwancha
22	DF	Ri Song-hung	22 February 2005 (aged 19)	(DPR Korea Football Association) Rimyongsu
23	GK	Kim Tae-bom	25 April 2005 (aged 19)	(DPR Korea Football Association) April 25

=== Saudi Arabia ===
The final squad was announced by the AFC when they released the final lists for all teams on 8 February 2025.

Head coach: (Brazil) Marcos Soares

No.	Pos.	Player	Date of birth (age)	Club
1	GK	Abdulelah Al-Ghamdi	14 August 2006 (aged 18)	(Saudi Arabian Football Federation) Al-Hilal
2	DF	Sultan Al-Essa	30 June 2005 (aged 19)	(Saudi Arabian Football Federation) Al-Hazem
3	DF	Turki Al-Madani	5 November 2007 (aged 17)	(Saudi Arabian Football Federation) Al-Ettifaq
4	DF	Saud Harun	19 July 2005 (aged 19)	(Saudi Arabian Football Federation) Al-Hilal
5	DF	Mohammed Barnawi	7 August 2005 (aged 19)	(Saudi Arabian Football Federation) Al-Orobah
6	DF	Saleh Barnawi	8 February 2007 (aged 18)	(Saudi Arabian Football Federation) Al-Hilal
7	FW	Ali Al-Mahdawi	28 April 2005 (aged 19)	(Saudi Arabian Football Federation) Al-Hilal
8	MF	Rakan Al-Ghamdi	6 September 2005 (aged 19)	(Royal Dutch Football Association) NEC
9	FW	**Talal Haji**	16 September 2007 (aged 17)	(Saudi Arabian Football Federation) Al-Riyadh
10	FW	Ziyad Al-Ghamdi	16 February 2005 (aged 19)	(Saudi Arabian Football Federation) Al-Ahli
11	FW	Saad Haqawi	8 October 2005 (aged 19)	(Saudi Arabian Football Federation) Al-Nassr
12	DF	Nawaf Al-Ghulaimish	2 May 2005 (aged 19)	(Saudi Arabian Football Federation) Al-Shabab
13	MF	Bassam Hazazi	29 March 2005 (aged 19)	(Saudi Arabian Football Federation) Al-Nassr
14	MF	Farhah Al-Shamrani	27 February 2006 (aged 18)	(Saudi Arabian Football Federation) Al-Kholood
15	FW	Amar Al-Yuhaybi	3 March 2006 (aged 18)	(Saudi Arabian Football Federation) Al-Ahli
16	DF	Saud Al-Tumbukti	28 January 2005 (aged 20)	(Saudi Arabian Football Federation) Al-Riyadh
17	FW	Hussain Al-Raqwani	27 September 2005 (aged 19)	(Saudi Arabian Football Federation) Abha
18	FW	Ramez Al-Attar	17 January 2006 (aged 19)	(Saudi Arabian Football Federation) Al-Ahli
19	DF	Awad Aman	16 January 2005 (aged 20)	(Saudi Arabian Football Federation) Al-Nassr
20	MF	Abdulmalik Al-Marwani	19 June 2005 (aged 19)	(Saudi Arabian Football Federation) Al-Taawoun
21	GK	Abdulrahman Al-Ghamdi	13 February 2006 (aged 18)	(Saudi Arabian Football Federation) Al-Taawoun
22	GK	Hamed Al-Shanqiti	26 April 2005 (aged 19)	(Saudi Arabian Football Federation) Al-Ittihad
23	FW	Thamer Al-Khaibari	3 December 2005 (aged 19)	(Saudi Arabian Football Federation) Al-Raed

== Group C ==
=== Indonesia ===
A 34-player provisional squad was announced on 5 January 2025. The final squad was announced on 4 February 2025.

Head coach: Indra Sjafri

No.	Pos.	Player	Date of birth (age)	Club
1	GK	Fitrah Maulana	24 May 2006 (aged 18)	(Football Association of Indonesia) Persib Bandung
2	DF	Rizdjar Nurviat	2 January 2006 (aged 19)	(Football Association of Indonesia) Borneo Samarinda
3	DF	Achmad Zidan	22 February 2006 (aged 18)	(Football Association of Indonesia) PSS Sleman
4	DF	**Kadek Arel**	4 April 2005 (aged 19)	(Football Association of Indonesia) Bali United
5	DF	Alfharezzi Buffon	28 April 2006 (aged 18)	(Football Association of Indonesia) Borneo Samarinda
6	MF	Evandra Florasta	17 June 2008 (aged 16)	(Football Association of Indonesia) Bhayangkara
7	FW	Arlyansyah Abdulmanan	20 December 2005 (aged 19)	(Football Association of Indonesia) PSIM Yogyakarta
8	MF	Aditya Warman	2 February 2005 (aged 20)	(Football Association of Indonesia) Persija Jakarta
9	FW	Jens Raven	12 October 2005 (aged 19)	(Royal Dutch Football Association) Dordrecht
10	MF	Welber Jardim	25 April 2007 (aged 17)	(Brazilian Football Confederation) São Paulo
11	FW	Jehan Pahlevi	18 March 2006 (aged 18)	(Football Association of Indonesia) Persiku Kudus
12	MF	Fandi Bagus	22 January 2006 (aged 19)	(Football Association of Indonesia) Bhayangkara
13	DF	Fava Sheva	6 April 2005 (aged 19)	(Football Association of Indonesia) PSPS Pekanbaru
14	DF	Sulthan Zaky	23 March 2006 (aged 18)	(Football Association of Indonesia) PSM Makassar
15	FW	Marselinus Ama Ola	21 March 2005 (aged 19)	(Royal Spanish Football Federation) UD Logroñés
16	DF	**Dony Tri Pamungkas**	11 January 2005 (aged 20)	(Football Association of Indonesia) Persija Jakarta
17	DF	Mufli Hidayat	7 August 2005 (aged 19)	(Football Association of Indonesia) PSM Makassar
18	MF	Toni Firmansyah	14 January 2005 (aged 20)	(Football Association of Indonesia) Persebaya Surabaya
19	FW	Muhammad Ragil	8 May 2005 (aged 19)	(Football Association of Indonesia) Bhayangkara
20	FW	Aulia Rahman	20 August 2006 (aged 18)	(Football Association of Indonesia) PSIS Semarang
21	DF	Iqbal Gwijangge	29 August 2006 (aged 18)	(Football Association of Indonesia) Barito Putera
22	GK	Wayan Arta	1 October 2006 (aged 18)	(Football Association of Indonesia) Bali United
23	GK	Ikram Algiffari	6 January 2006 (aged 19)	(Football Association of Indonesia) Semen Padang

=== Iran ===
The final squad was announced on 15 February 2025.

Head coach: Hossein Abdi

No.	Pos.	Player	Date of birth (age)	Club
1	GK	Arsha Shakouri	1 October 2006 (aged 18)	(Football Federation Islamic Republic of Iran) Havadar
2	DF	Nima Andarz	22 January 2006 (aged 19)	(Royal Spanish Football Federation) Leganés
3	DF	Hesam Nafari	7 May 2006 (aged 18)	(Football Federation Islamic Republic of Iran) Zob Ahan
4	DF	Alireza Homaeifard	14 January 2006 (aged 19)	(Football Federation Islamic Republic of Iran) Persepolis
5	DF	Erfan Darvishaali	22 March 2006 (aged 18)	(Football Federation Islamic Republic of Iran) Foolad
6	MF	Samir Hoboobati	4 February 2006 (aged 19)	(Football Federation Islamic Republic of Iran) Persepolis
7	FW	Esmaeil Gholizadeh	18 February 2006 (aged 18)	(Football Federation Islamic Republic of Iran) Sepahan
8	MF	Amirmohammad Razzaghinia	11 April 2006 (aged 18)	(Football Federation Islamic Republic of Iran) Gol Gohar
9	DF	Yaghoub Barajeh	26 January 2006 (aged 19)	(Football Federation Islamic Republic of Iran) Persepolis
10	FW	Reza Ghandipour	13 January 2006 (aged 19)	(Football Federation Islamic Republic of Iran) Malavan
11	MF	Mahan Sadeghi	23 June 2006 (aged 18)	(Football Federation Islamic Republic of Iran) Malavan
12	GK	Armin Abbasi	20 May 2006 (aged 18)	(Football Federation Islamic Republic of Iran) Persepolis
13	DF	Ali Hassani	13 August 2006 (aged 18)	(Football Federation Islamic Republic of Iran) Foolad
14	MF	Abbas Kahrizi	31 January 2005 (aged 20)	(Football Federation Islamic Republic of Iran) Paykan
15	MF	Mobin Dehghan	11 September 2005 (aged 19)	(Football Federation Islamic Republic of Iran) Kheybar
16	MF	Abolfazl Zamani	1 March 2006 (aged 18)	(Football Federation Islamic Republic of Iran) Esteghlal
17	MF	Mohammad Dindari	26 May 2005 (aged 19)	(Football Federation Islamic Republic of Iran) Havadar
18	DF	Abolfazl Zoleikhaei	9 March 2006 (aged 18)	(Football Federation Islamic Republic of Iran) Esteghlal
19	FW	Pourya Shahrabadi	15 June 2006 (aged 18)	(Football Federation Islamic Republic of Iran) Gol Gohar
20	MF	Yousef Mazraeh	13 June 2005 (aged 19)	(Football Federation Islamic Republic of Iran) Foolad
21	FW	Abolfazl Moredi	7 February 2006 (aged 19)	(Football Federation Islamic Republic of Iran) Foolad
22	GK	Mohammad Gandomi	2 August 2005 (aged 19)	(Football Federation Islamic Republic of Iran) Persepolis
23	MF	Sina Moazemitabar	24 December 2005 (aged 19)	(Football Federation Islamic Republic of Iran) Sepahan

=== Uzbekistan ===
A 25-player provisional squad was announced on 26 January 2025. The final squad was announced on 8 February 2025.

Head coach: Farhod Nishonov

No.	Pos.	Player	Date of birth (age)	Caps	Goals	Club
1	GK	Maksim Murkaev	21 February 2005 (aged 19)	3	0	(Uzbekistan Football Association) Surkhon
2	DF	Saidkhon Khamidov	20 January 2005 (aged 20)	9	0	(Uzbekistan Football Association) Olympic MobiUz
3	DF	Mukhammadali Zokhidov	27 January 2005 (aged 20)	7	0	(Uzbekistan Football Association) Pakhtakor
4	DF	Giyosjon Rizakulov	20 February 2005 (aged 19)	16	0	(Uzbekistan Football Association) Qizilqum
5	DF	Azizbek Tulkinbekov	10 February 2007 (aged 18)	17	2	(Uzbekistan Football Association) Bunyodkor
6	MF	Ravshan Khayrullaev	21 August 2005 (aged 19)	16	9	(Uzbekistan Football Association) Bukhara
7	MF	Daler Tukhsanov	11 April 2005 (aged 19)	18	1	(Uzbekistan Football Association) Pakhtakor
8	FW	Amirbek Saidov	1 February 2006 (aged 19)	12	0	(Football Association of Serbia) Jedinstvo Ub
9	FW	Saidumarkhon Saidnurullaev	13 April 2005 (aged 19)	13	6	(Uzbekistan Football Association) Pakhtakor
10	FW	Mukhammadali Urinboev	24 April 2005 (aged 19)	15	3	(Uzbekistan Football Association) Pakhtakor
11	FW	Murodjon Komilov	24 January 2005 (aged 20)	16	4	(Uzbekistan Football Association) Kokand 1912
12	GK	Mukhammadyusuf Sobirov	20 April 2006 (aged 18)	11	0	(Uzbekistan Football Association) Sogdiana
13	DF	Bekhruz Djumatov	13 February 2006 (aged 18)	15	0	(Uzbekistan Football Association) Sogdiana
14	DF	Ozodbek Kurbonov	27 February 2005 (aged 19)	4	1	(Uzbekistan Football Association) Olympic MobiUz
15	MF	Lazizbek Mirzaev	5 October 2006 (aged 18)	0	0	(Royal Spanish Football Federation) Leganés
16	MF	Mukhammadali Reimov	26 June 2006 (aged 18)	16	0	(Uzbekistan Football Association) Olympic MobiUz
17	MF	Ollobergan Karimov	17 June 2006 (aged 18)	12	0	(Uzbekistan Football Association) Bunyodkor
18	MF	Narimonjon Akhmadjonov	18 March 2005 (aged 19)	13	0	(Uzbekistan Football Association) Bunyodkor
19	MF	Rustambek Fomin	9 July 2005 (aged 19)	22	1	(Uzbekistan Football Association) Pakhtakor
20	DF	Dilshod Abdullaev	9 May 2006 (aged 18)	15	3	(Uzbekistan Football Association) Pakhtakor
21	GK	Samandar Muratbaev	3 March 2005 (aged 19)	11	0	(Uzbekistan Football Association) Metallurg
22	MF	Asilbek Jumaev	25 March 2005 (aged 19)	12	0	(Uzbekistan Football Association) Surkhon
23	FW	Abdugafur Khaydarov	16 February 2005 (aged 19)	9	3	(Uzbekistan Football Association) Surkhon

=== Yemen ===
A 27-player provisional squad was announced on 24 December 2024. The final squad was announced on 3 February 2025.

Head coach: Mohammed Al-Baadani

No.	Pos.	Player	Date of birth (age)	Club
1	GK	Wadhah Al-Radfani	24 January 2008 (aged 17)	(Yemen Football Association) Al-Tilal
2	DF	Mohammed Raed	12 October 2007 (aged 17)	(Yemen Football Association) 22 Mayu
3	MF	Anwar Al-Turaiqi	1 January 2006 (aged 19)	(Yemen Football Association) Al-Shaab Sanaa
4	DF	**Mohammed Al-Qashmi**	7 October 2005 (aged 19)	(Yemen Football Association) Al-Sha'ab Ibb
5	DF	Hisham Awad	15 November 2006 (aged 18)	(The Football Association) Kiveton Miners
6	DF	Haitham Al-Salami	1 January 2006 (aged 19)	(Yemen Football Association) Al-Shaab Sanaa
7	FW	**Mohammed Al-Brwany**	29 July 2007 (aged 17)	(Yemen Football Association) Al-Wehda Aden
8	MF	Hasan Al-Kawmani	28 May 2005 (aged 19)	(Yemen Football Association) Al-Wehda Sanaa
9	FW	**Abdulaziz Masnom**	6 February 2006 (aged 19)	(Saudi Arabian Football Federation) Al-Orobah
10	MF	Essam Radman	27 July 2006 (aged 18)	(Yemen Football Association) Al-Shaab Sanaa
11	FW	Abdulrahman Al-Khadher	5 November 2008 (aged 16)	(Yemen Football Association) Al-Wehda Aden
12	DF	Saeed Al-Shaban	10 October 2006 (aged 18)	(Yemen Football Association) Al-Ahli Aden
13	DF	Ahmed Al-Hajj	29 September 2007 (aged 17)	(Yemen Football Association) Al-Shula
14	DF	Osamah Khaled Hamid	15 December 2006 (aged 18)	(Yemen Football Association) Shamsan
15	DF	Mohammed Al-Hendi	17 January 2007 (aged 18)	(Yemen Football Association) Al-Ittihad Seiyun
16	MF	Mohammed Moqbel	12 February 2006 (aged 19)	(Yemen Football Association) Shamsan
17	MF	Osamah Al-Matari	10 November 2006 (aged 18)	(Yemen Football Association) Al-Yarmuk Al-Rawda
18	FW	Adel Qasem	1 March 2008 (aged 16)	(Yemen Football Association) Al-Tilal
19	MF	Mohammed Al-Awami	28 October 2005 (aged 19)	(Yemen Football Association) Al-Shaab Sanaa
20	MF	Abdullah Haidan	9 March 2005 (aged 19)	(Yemen Football Association) Al-Shula
21	FW	Omar Al-Katheri	27 February 2006 (aged 18)	(Yemen Football Association) Al-Shaab Hadramaut
22	GK	Osamah Mokref	1 March 2005 (aged 19)	(Yemen Football Association) Al-Ittihad Ibb
23	GK	Marwan Meyad	7 November 2007 (aged 17)	(Yemen Football Association) Al-Wehda Sanaa

== Group D ==
=== Japan ===
The final squad was announced on 28 January 2025.

Head coach: Yuzo Funakoshi

No.	Pos.	Player	Date of birth (age)	Club
1	GK	Keisuke Nakamura	27 April 2005 (aged 19)	(Japan Football Association) Tokyo Verdy
2	DF	Rei Umeki	25 August 2005 (aged 19)	(Japan Football Association) FC Imabari
3	DF	Niko Takahashi	17 August 2005 (aged 19)	(Japan Football Association) Cerezo Osaka
4	DF	Kazunari Kita	16 September 2005 (aged 19)	(Japan Football Association) Kyoto Sanga
5	DF	Rion Ichihara	7 July 2005 (aged 19)	(Japan Football Association) Omiya Ardija
6	MF	Kosei Ogura	9 April 2005 (aged 19)	(Japan Football Association) Hosei University
7	MF	Ryunosuke Sato	16 October 2006 (aged 18)	(Japan Football Association) Fagiano Okayama
8	MF	Yotaro Nakajima	22 April 2006 (aged 18)	(Japan Football Association) Sanfrecce Hiroshima
9	FW	Soma Kanda	29 December 2005 (aged 19)	(Japan Football Association) Kawasaki Frontale
10	MF	Yuto Ozeki	6 February 2005 (aged 20)	(Japan Football Association) Kawasaki Frontale
11	FW	Alen Inoue	19 September 2006 (aged 18)	(Japan Football Association) Sanfrecce Hiroshima
12	GK	Wataru Goto	8 May 2006 (aged 18)	(Japan Football Association) FC Tokyo
13	MF	Hisatsugu Ishii	7 July 2005 (aged 19)	(Japan Football Association) Shonan Bellmare
14	FW	Yutaka Michiwaki	6 April 2006 (aged 18)	(Royal Belgian Football Association) Beveren
15	DF	Harumichi Shiokawa	25 April 2005 (aged 19)	(Japan Football Association) Ryutsu Keizai University
16	DF	Rikuto Kuwahara	21 January 2005 (aged 20)	(Japan Football Association) Meiji University
17	MF	Hagumu Nakagawa	7 June 2005 (aged 19)	(Japan Football Association) Ryutsu Keizai University
18	DF	Katsuma Fuse	11 March 2007 (aged 17)	(Japan Football Association) Nihon Univ. Fujisawa High School
19	DF	Kaito Tsuchiya	12 May 2006 (aged 18)	(Japan Football Association) Kawasaki Frontale
20	FW	Rento Takaoka	12 March 2007 (aged 17)	(Japan Football Association) Nissho Gakuen High School
21	MF	Shunsuke Saito	26 April 2005 (aged 19)	(Japan Football Association) Mito HollyHock
22	MF	Nick Schmidt	12 September 2007 (aged 17)	(German Football Association) FC St. Pauli
23	GK	Rui Araki	14 October 2007 (aged 17)	(Japan Football Association) Gamba Osaka

=== South Korea ===
A 27-player provisional squad was announced on 15 January 2025. The final squad was announced on 6 February 2025.

Head coach: Lee Chang-won

No.	Pos.	Player	Date of birth (age)	Club
1	GK	Park Sang-young	17 September 2005 (aged 19)	(Korea Football Association) Daegu FC
2	DF	Bae Hyun-seo	16 February 2005 (aged 19)	(Korea Football Association) FC Seoul
3	DF	Shim Yeon-won	2 August 2005 (aged 19)	(Korea Football Association) Daegu FC
4	FW	Cho Hyeon-u	1 January 2005 (aged 20)	(Korea Football Association) Daejeon Hana Citizen
5	DF	Kang Min-woo	2 March 2006 (aged 18)	(Korea Football Association) Ulsan HD
6	MF	Kim Ho-jin	29 September 2005 (aged 19)	(Korea Football Association) Yong In University
7	MF	Son Seung-min	9 May 2005 (aged 19)	(Korea Football Association) Daegu FC
8	MF	Shin Sung	13 January 2005 (aged 20)	(Korea Football Association) Bucheon FC 1995
9	FW	Ha Jeong-woo	8 November 2005 (aged 19)	(Korea Football Association) Seongnam FC
10	FW	Kim Tae-won	11 March 2005 (aged 19)	(Portuguese Football Federation) Portimonense
11	MF	Kang Ju-hyeok	27 August 2006 (aged 18)	(Korea Football Association) FC Seoul
12	MF	Park Seung-soo	17 March 2007 (aged 17)	(Korea Football Association) Suwon Samsung Bluewings
13	MF	Lee Chang-woo	12 March 2006 (aged 18)	(Korea Football Association) Pohang Steelers
14	MF	Baek Min-gyu	20 November 2005 (aged 19)	(Korea Football Association) Incheon United
15	DF	Lee Geon-hee	11 March 2005 (aged 19)	(Korea Football Association) Suwon Samsung Bluewings
16	DF	Kim Seo-jin	7 January 2005 (aged 20)	(Korea Football Association) Cheonan City
17	MF	Jin Tae-ho	20 January 2006 (aged 19)	(Korea Football Association) Jeonbuk Hyundai Motors
18	MF	An Chi-woo	23 October 2005 (aged 19)	(Korea Football Association) Busan Transportation Corporation
19	DF	Kim Hyun-woo	27 July 2006 (aged 18)	(Korea Football Association) Seoul E-Land
20	DF	Shin Min-ha	15 September 2005 (aged 19)	(Korea Football Association) Gangwon FC
21	GK	Kim Min-soo	8 July 2005 (aged 19)	(Korea Football Association) Daejeon Hana Citizen
22	MF	Yoon Do-young	28 October 2006 (aged 18)	(Korea Football Association) Daejeon Hana Citizen
23	GK	Gong Si-hyeon	23 February 2005 (aged 19)	(Korea Football Association) Jeonbuk Hyundai Motors

=== Syria ===
The final squad was announced by the AFC when they released the final lists for all teams on 8 February 2025.

Head coach: Mohammad Kwid

No.	Pos.	Player	Date of birth (age)	Club
1	GK	Maksim Sarraf	15 March 2005 (aged 19)	(Uzbekistan Football Association) Andijon
2	DF	Omran Khalouf	3 July 2005 (aged 19)	(United Arab Emirates Football Association) Ajman
3	DF	Nabil Al-Omar	10 January 2006 (aged 19)	(Swedish Football Association) Västerås SK
4	DF	Hasan Al-Mahmoud	5 January 2006 (aged 19)	(Syrian Football Association) Al-Jaish
5	DF	Abdulrahman Al-Arjah	10 January 2006 (aged 19)	(Syrian Football Association) Al-Karameh
6	MF	Ahmad Al-Kalou	1 January 2005 (aged 20)	(Syrian Football Association) Ahli Aleppo
7	MF	Anas Dahhan	31 January 2006 (aged 19)	(Syrian Football Association) Ahli Aleppo
8	MF	Aland Abdi	5 May 2005 (aged 19)	(Royal Dutch Football Association) Roda JC
9	FW	Youshaa Knaj	25 November 2005 (aged 19)	(Hellenic Football Federation) Panserraikos
10	MF	Ahmad Soufi	15 September 2005 (aged 19)	(Syrian Football Association) Hiteen
11	FW	Majd Ramadan	19 May 2005 (aged 19)	(Slovak Football Association) Petržalka
12	MF	Khaled Al-Hamoush	22 February 2005 (aged 19)	(United Arab Emirates Football Association) Al-Wasl
13	FW	Homam Mahmoud	8 April 2006 (aged 18)	(German Football Association) Jahn Regensburg
14	MF	Mahmoud Al-Omar	15 January 2005 (aged 20)	(Syrian Football Association) Ahli Aleppo
15	DF	Hashem Al-Hammami	5 January 2006 (aged 19)	(Syrian Football Association) Al-Jaish
16	FW	Monir Hassan	9 January 2006 (aged 19)	(German Football Association) Borussia Lindenthal-Hohenlind
17	FW	Kawa Issa	10 January 2006 (aged 19)	(Syrian Football Association) Al-Wahda
18	MF	Saadaldin Al-Khleif	27 February 2006 (aged 18)	(German Football Association) Wehen Wiesbaden
19	FW	Mohammad Al-Mustafa	20 January 2005 (aged 20)	(Syrian Football Association) Al-Wathba
20	DF	Mamdouh Warda	15 July 2007 (aged 17)	(Syrian Football Association) Tishreen
21	FW	Ahmad Khalil	11 April 2006 (aged 18)	(Syrian Football Association) Jableh
22	GK	Amr Sweidan	1 April 2005 (aged 19)	(Syrian Football Association) Al-Karameh
23	GK	Zain Alabdin Mahmoud	1 September 2007 (aged 17)	(Syrian Football Association) Tishreen

=== Thailand ===
The final squad was announced on 8 February 2025.

Head coach: (Brazil) Emerson

No.	Pos.	Player	Date of birth (age)	Club
1	GK	Anut Samran	16 April 2006 (aged 18)	(Football Association of Thailand) Buriram United
2	DF	Pikanet Laohawiwat	4 March 2005 (aged 19)	(Football Association of Thailand) Buriram United
3	DF	Piyawat Petra	15 March 2005 (aged 19)	(Football Association of Thailand) Kanchanaburi Power
4	DF	Jhetsaphat Khuantanom	28 January 2005 (aged 20)	(Football Association of Thailand) Kanchanaburi Power
5	DF	Singha Marasa	19 August 2006 (aged 18)	(Football Association of Thailand) Buriram United
6	MF	Rapeephat Padthaisong	12 December 2005 (aged 19)	(Football Association of Thailand) Suphanburi
7	FW	Thanawut Phochai	2 December 2005 (aged 19)	(Football Association of Thailand) Nongbua Pitchaya
8	MF	Dutsadee Buranajutanon	7 March 2006 (aged 18)	(Football Association of Thailand) Buriram United
9	FW	**Yotsakorn Burapha**	8 June 2005 (aged 19)	(Football Association of Thailand) PT Prachuap
10	MF	Thanakrit Chotmuangpak	1 September 2006 (aged 18)	(Football Association of Thailand) Buriram United
11	MF	Ratthaphum Phankhechon	25 May 2005 (aged 19)	(Football Association of Thailand) Police Tero
12	GK	Kittipong Bunmak	22 March 2005 (aged 19)	(Football Association of Thailand) Buriram United
13	MF	Jittipat Wasungnoen	7 June 2005 (aged 19)	(Football Association of Thailand) PT Prachuap
14	MF	Jirapong Pungviravong	20 September 2006 (aged 18)	(Football Association of Thailand) Buriram United
15	DF	Parinya Nusong	7 April 2005 (aged 19)	(Football Association of Thailand) Chonburi
16	DF	Puttaburin Channawan	7 May 2005 (aged 19)	(Football Association of Thailand) Nongbua Pitchaya
17	FW	Pitipong Wongbut	29 April 2005 (aged 19)	(Football Association of Thailand) Lampang
18	DF	Jirapol Saelio	12 March 2006 (aged 18)	(Football Association of Thailand) North Bangkok University
19	MF	Paripan Wongsa	19 March 2005 (aged 19)	(Football Association of Thailand) Sisaket United
20	FW	Caelan Ryan	12 October 2005 (aged 19)	(Football Association of Thailand) Sisaket United
21	MF	Peeranan Buakai	17 June 2005 (aged 19)	(Football Association of Thailand) Nongbua Pitchaya
22	MF	Phongsakon Sangkasopha	19 October 2006 (aged 18)	(Football Association of Thailand) Ratchaburi
23	GK	Prapot Chongcharoen	4 January 2007 (aged 18)	(Football Association of Thailand) Buriram United
