= Football at the 2026 Asian Games – Men's team squads =

List of football squads for XX Asian Games

The following is a list of squads for each nation competing in men's football at the 2026 Asian Games in Osaka, Toyota, Nagoya and Kariya, Japan. Each nation must submit a squad of between 18 and 23 players, whom must be born on or after 1 January 2003, and three of whom can be older dispensation players are eligible to compete in the tournament.

== Group A ==
=== Japan ===
Japan announced their final squad on 31 July.

Head coach: Gō Ōiwa

No.	Pos.	Player	Date of birth (age)	Club
1	GK	Alexandre Pisano	10 January 2006 (age 20)	(Japan Football Association) Nagoya Grampus
2	DF	Rei Umeki	25 August 2005 (age 21)	(Japan Football Association) Imabari
3	DF	Keita Kosugi	18 March 2006 (age 20)	(German Football Association) Eintracht Frankfurt
4	DF	Kaito Tsuchiya	12 May 2006 (age 20)	(Japan Football Association) Fukushima United
5	DF	Rion Ichihara	7 July 2005 (age 21)	(Royal Dutch Football Association) AZ Alkmaar
6	DF	Shuto Nagano	1 April 2006 (age 20)	(Japan Football Association) FC Tokyo
7	MF	Nelson Ishiwatari	10 May 2005 (age 21)	(Royal Belgian Football Association) Sint-Truidense
8	MF	Kenshin Yasuda	5 March 2005 (age 21)	(Japan Football Association) V-Varen Nagasaki
9	FW	Yutaka Michiwaki	5 April 2006 (age 20)	(Japan Football Association) Iwaki
10	MF	Hisatsugu Ishii	7 July 2005 (age 21)	(Japan Football Association) Shonan Bellmare
11	FW	Yumeki Yokoyama	23 September 2005 (age 21)	(Japan Football Association) Cerezo Osaka
12	GK	Masataka Kobayashi	20 September 2005 (age 21)	(Japan Football Association) Matsumoto Yamaga
13	FW	Shusuke Furuya	26 January 2005 (age 21)	(Japan Football Association) Tokyo International University
14	MF	Yuto Ozeki	6 February 2005 (age 21)	(Japan Football Association) Kawasaki Frontale
15	DF	Soichiro Mori	29 June 2007 (age 19)	(Japan Football Association) Nagoya Grampus
16	FW	Yuya Fukunaga	29 August 2005 (age 21)	(Japan Football Association) Kyoto Sangyo University
17	MF	Yotaro Nakajima	22 April 2006 (age 20)	(Japan Football Association) Sanfrecce Hiroshima
18	MF	Yudai Shimamoto	26 October 2006 (age 19)	(Japan Football Association) Shimizu S-Pulse
19	FW	Uche Brian Seo Nwadike	7 July 2005 (age 21)	(Danish Football Association) AaB
20	FW	Sena Ishibashi	22 April 2006 (age 20)	(Japan Football Association) Shonan Bellmare
21	DF	Mihiro Sato	26 February 2007 (age 19)	(Japan Football Association) Albirex Niigata
22	DF	Tariqkani Hayato Okabe	5 July 2006 (age 20)	(Japan Football Association) Toyo University
23	GK	Rui Araki	14 October 2007 (age 18)	(Japan Football Association) Gamba Osaka

=== Thailand ===
Thailand announced their final squad on 2 September.

Head coach: Thawatchai Damrong-Ongtrakul

No.	Pos.	Player	Date of birth (age)	Caps	Goals	Club
1	GK	Sorawat Phosaman	30 January 2003 (age 23)			(Football Association of Thailand) Pattani
2	DF	Chanon Tamma	19 March 2004 (age 22)			(Football Association of Thailand) BG Pathum United
3	DF	Oussama Thiangkham	4 November 2003 (age 22)			(Football Association of Thailand) PT Prachuap
4	DF	Chanapach Buaphan (captain)	22 March 2004 (age 22)			(Football Association of Thailand) BG Pathum United
5	DF	Theekawin Chansri	17 February 2004 (age 22)			(Football Association of Thailand) Muangthong United
6	MF	Sittha Boonlha	2 September 2004 (age 22)			(Football Association of Thailand) Port
7	FW	Thanawut Phochai	2 December 2005 (age 20)			(Japan Football Association) Sagamihara
8	MF	Chawanwit Saelao	12 October 2004 (age 21)			(Football Association of Thailand) Prime Bangkok
9	FW	Yotsakorn Burapha	8 June 2005 (age 21)			(Football Association of Thailand) Chonburi
10	MF	Thanakrit Chotmuangpak	6 January 2006 (age 20)			(Football Association of Thailand) Buriram United
11	MF	Siraphop Wandee	22 January 2004 (age 22)			(Football Association of Thailand) Nara
12	DF	Auttapon Sangtong	29 April 2004 (age 22)			(Football Association of Thailand) Nakhon Pathom United
13	DF	Nathan James	28 September 2004 (age 21)			(Football Association of Thailand) Mahasarakham
14	FW	Jehhanafee Mamah	24 October 2005 (age 20)			(Football Association of Thailand) PT Prachuap
15	MF	Kittapak Seangsawat	8 April 2005 (age 21)			(Football Association of Thailand) Muangthong United
16	DF	Pichitchai Sienkrathok	18 May 2003 (age 23)			(Football Association of Thailand) Ayutthaya United
17	FW	Worawut Noisri	16 February 2005 (age 21)			(Football Association of Thailand) Chiangmai United
18	MF	Patipanchai Phothep	21 July 2003 (age 23)			(Football Association of Thailand) Rayong
19	MF	Paripan Wongsa	19 March 2005 (age 21)			(Football Association of Thailand) Rasisalai United
20	GK	Sirassawut Wongruankhum	27 October 2005 (age 20)			(Football Association of Thailand) Chiangrai United
21	DF	Phon-Ek Jensen	30 March 2003 (age 23)			(Football Association of Thailand) PT Prachuap
22	DF	Wichan Inaram	20 July 2007 (age 19)			(Football Association of Thailand) Bangkok United
23	GK	Chommaphat Boonloet	17 February 2003 (age 23)			(Football Association of Thailand) Uthai Thani

=== Kyrgyzstan ===
Kyrgyzstan announced their final squad on 5 September.

Head coach: Nadyrbek Mamadaliev

=== Hong Kong ===
Hong Kong announced their final squad on 17 July.

Head coach: Tsang Chiu Tat

No.	Pos.	Player	Date of birth (age)	Club
1	GK	Cheung Kwai Wa	2 January 2003 (age 23)	(Football Association of Hong Kong, China) Kowloon City
2	DF	Krisna Korani	2 March 2004 (age 22)	(Football Association of Hong Kong, China) Eastern District
3	DF	Sung Wang Ngai	2 December 2003 (age 22)	(Football Association of Hong Kong, China) Eastern District
4	DF	Tsang Yi Hang	27 October 2003 (age 22)	(Football Association of Hong Kong, China) Lee Man
5	DF	Hélio*	31 January 1986 (age 40)	(Football Association of Hong Kong, China) Eastern District
6	MF	Wu Chun Ming*	21 November 1997 (age 28)	(Football Association of Hong Kong, China) Lee Man
7	MF	Ma Hei Wai	3 February 2004 (age 22)	(Chinese Football Association) Shaanxi Union
8	MF	Ngan Cheuk Pan*	22 January 1998 (age 28)	(Chinese Football Association) Qiangdao Hainiu
9	FW	Michael Udebuluzor	11 April 2004 (age 22)	(Football Association of Hong Kong, China) Lee Man
10	MF	Sohgo Ichikawa	30 July 2004 (age 22)	(Football Association of Hong Kong, China) Lee Man
11	FW	Anthony Pinto	1 December 2006 (age 19)	(The Football Association) Loughborough Students
12	DF	Kwok Chun Nok	6 March 2004 (age 22)	(Football Association of Hong Kong, China) Kowloon City
13	DF	Tsang Lok To	15 July 2005 (age 21)	(United States Soccer Federation) Vermont Catamounts
14	DF	Loong Tsz Hin	8 August 2004 (age 22)	(Football Association of Hong Kong, China) Eastern
15	DF	Yim Kai Cheuk	12 April 2004 (age 22)	(Football Association of Hong Kong, China) Kowloon City
16	FW	Chen Ngo Hin	27 February 2003 (age 23)	(Football Association of Hong Kong, China) Kowloon City
17	FW	Ng Yu Hei	13 February 2006 (age 20)	(Chinese Football Association) Chongqing Tonglianglong
18	GK	Chan Kun Sun	13 August 2004 (age 22)	(Football Association of Hong Kong, China) North District
19	GK	Poon Sheung Hei	29 September 2006 (age 19)	(Football Association of Hong Kong, China) HKFC
20	FW	Matthew Slattery	5 April 2005 (age 21)	(Football Association of Hong Kong, China) Kowloon City
21	FW	Lee Chun Ting	1 June 2005 (age 21)	(Football Association of Hong Kong, China) Eastern
22	MF	Chin Yu Ho	13 February 2008 (age 18)	(Portuguese Football Federation) Oriental
23	FW	Lee Lok Him	18 April 2004 (age 22)	(Football Association of Hong Kong, China) Eastern

* Over-aged player.

== Group B ==
=== China ===
China announced their 24-man preliminary squad on 1 September. The final squad was announced on 11 September.

Head coach: (Spain) Antonio Puche

No.	Pos.	Player	Date of birth (age)	Caps	Goals	Club
1	GK	Yu Jinyong	6 July 2004 (aged 22)	6	0	(Chinese Football Association) Shandong Taishan
2	DF	Hu Hetao	5 October 2003 (aged 22)	16	0	(Chinese Football Association) Chengdu Rongcheng
3	DF	Liu Haofan	23 October 2003 (aged 22)	13	0	(Chinese Football Association) Zhejiang FC
4	DF	Shi Songchen	30 December 2005 (aged 20)	2	0	(Chinese Football Association) Shandong Taishan
5	DF	Zhu Chenjie*	23 August 2000 (aged 26)	10	0	(Chinese Football Association) Shanghai Shenhua
6	MF	Xu Bin	2 May 2004 (aged 22)	11	0	(The Football Association) Wolverhampton Wanderers
7	FW	Xiang Yuwang	18 December 2003 (aged 22)	12	4	(Chinese Football Association) Chongqing Tonglianglong
8	MF	Li Xinxiang	30 November 2005 (aged 20)	0	0	(Chinese Football Association) Shanghai Port
9	FW	Zhang Yuning*	5 January 1997 (aged 29)	12	7	(Chinese Football Association) Beijing Guoan
10	FW	Wang Yudong	23 November 2006 (aged 19)	14	4	(Chinese Football Association) Zhejiang FC
11	MF	Kuai Jiwen	28 February 2006 (aged 20)	10	1	(Chinese Football Association) Shanghai Port
12	GK	Yao Haoyang	28 October 2006 (aged 19)	0	0	(Chinese Football Association) Chongqing Tonglianglong
13	MF	Mutellip Iminqari	2 May 2004 (aged 22)	12	0	(Chinese Football Association) Chengdu Rongcheng
14	MF	Imran Memet	3 May 2005 (aged 21)	0	0	(Chinese Football Association) Shandong Taishan
15	MF	Wu Xi* (captain)	19 February 1989 (aged 37)	4	1	(Chinese Football Association) Shanghai Shenhua
16	GK	Li Hao	6 March 2004 (aged 22)	9	0	(Chinese Football Association) Qingdao West Coast
17	DF	He Yiran	27 February 2005 (aged 21)	10	0	(Chinese Football Association) Chengdu Rongcheng
18	MF	Chen Zeshi	21 February 2005 (aged 21)	7	0	(Chinese Football Association) Shandong Taishan
19	FW	Behram Abduweli	8 March 2003 (aged 23)	17	4	(Chinese Football Association) Chengdu Rongcheng
20	MF	Yang Haoyu	25 May 2006 (aged 20)	12	0	(Chinese Football Association) Shanghai Shenhua
21	DF	Peng Xiao	28 July 2005 (aged 21)	12	2	(Chinese Football Association) Shandong Taishan
22	MF	Mao Weijie	28 May 2005 (aged 21)	8	0	(Chinese Football Association) Dalian Yingbo
23	DF	Alex Yang	13 June 2005 (aged 21)	8	0	(Chinese Football Association) Shanghai Port

* Over-aged player.

=== Iran ===
Iran announced their final squad on 22 August.

Head coach: Hossein Abdi

No.	Pos.	Player	Date of birth (age)	Caps	Goals	Club
1	GK	Mohammad Khalifeh	19 August 2004 (aged 22)	10	0	(Football Federation Islamic Republic of Iran) Aluminium Arak
2	DF	Abolfazl Koohi	30 January 2005 (aged 21)	0	0	(Football Federation Islamic Republic of Iran) Nassaji
3	DF	Farzin Moamelegari	14 January 2003 (aged 23)	10	0	(Football Federation Islamic Republic of Iran) Malavan
4	DF	Danial Eiri	26 October 2003 (aged 22)	9	0	(Football Federation Islamic Republic of Iran) Persepolis
5	DF	Amin Hazbavi	6 May 2003 (aged 23)	9	1	(Football Federation Islamic Republic of Iran) Sepahan
6	MF	Mobin Dehghan	11 September 2005 (aged 21)	0	0	(United Arab Emirates Football Association) Al Wahda
7	FW	Esmaeil Gholizadeh	18 February 2006 (aged 20)	3	0	(Football Federation Islamic Republic of Iran) Esteghlal
8	MF	Amirmohammad Razzaghinia	11 April 2006 (aged 20)	9	2	(Football Federation Islamic Republic of Iran) Esteghlal
9	FW	Saeid Saharkhizan	26 June 2003 (aged 23)	7	4	(Football Federation Islamic Republic of Iran) Esteghlal
10	FW	Amirhossein Hosseinzadeh* (captain)	30 October 2000 (aged 25)	5	1	(Football Federation Islamic Republic of Iran) Tractor
11	FW	Kasra Taheri	6 August 2006 (aged 20)	4	6	(Football Federation Islamic Republic of Iran) Sepahan
12	GK	Adib Zarei	16 April 2003 (aged 23)	0	0	(Football Federation Islamic Republic of Iran) Shams Azar
13	DF	Soheil Sahraei	19 May 2003 (aged 23)	2	0	(Football Federation Islamic Republic of Iran) Gol Gohar
14	MF	Mahdi Jafari	2 December 2005 (aged 20)	10	2	(Football Federation Islamic Republic of Iran) Malavan
15	DF	Masoud Mohebi	6 February 2005 (aged 21)	6	1	(Football Federation Islamic Republic of Iran) Kheybar
16	MF	Abbas Kahrizi	31 January 2005 (aged 21)	0	0	(Football Federation Islamic Republic of Iran) Aluminium Arak
17	FW	Reza Ghandipour	13 January 2006 (aged 20)	7	0	(United Arab Emirates Football Association) Shabab Al Ahli
18	MF	Pouria Latififar	16 August 2003 (aged 23)	7	0	(Football Federation Islamic Republic of Iran) Persepolis
19	DF	Yasin Jorjani	20 September 2003 (aged 23)	0	0	(Football Federation Islamic Republic of Iran) Sepahan
20	FW	Yousef Mazraeh	13 June 2005 (aged 21)	0	0	(Football Federation Islamic Republic of Iran) Foolad
21	FW	Pouria Shahrabadi	15 June 2006 (aged 20)	0	0	(Football Federation Islamic Republic of Iran) Persepolis
22	GK	Armin Abbasi	26 May 2006 (aged 20)	0	0	(Football Federation Islamic Republic of Iran) Paykan
23	MF	Ghasem Latifi	17 March 2004 (aged 22)	0	0	(Football Federation Islamic Republic of Iran) Foolad

* Over-aged player.

=== North Korea ===
North Korea announced their final squad on 5 September.

Head coach: Ri Kwang-chon

No.	Pos.	Player	Date of birth (age)	Caps	Goals	Club
1	GK	Kang Ju-hyok* (captain)	31 May 1997 (age 29)	24	0	(DPR Korea Football Association) Hwaebul
2	DF	Jong Ye-won	28 October 2003 (age 22)	0	0	(DPR Korea Football Association) Kigwancha
3	DF	Kim Kum-chon	10 March 2003 (age 23)	3	0	(DPR Korea Football Association) Amnokgang
4	DF	Ri Song-hung	22 February 2005 (age 21)	0	0	(DPR Korea Football Association) Ryomyong
5	DF	Jong Hwi-nam	15 May 2003 (age 23)	3	0	(DPR Korea Football Association) Ryomyong
6	DF	Han Jae-yong	15 January 2006 (age 20)	3	0	(DPR Korea Football Association) Amnokgang
7	MF	Ri Kum-chol	26 March 2004 (age 22)	0	0	(DPR Korea Football Association) Ryomyong
8	MF	Pak Hyok-song	10 January 2004 (age 22)	0	0	(DPR Korea Football Association) Kyonggongopsong
9	FW	Ho Chol-myong	9 January 2003 (age 23)	1	0	(DPR Korea Football Association) Pyongyang
10	MF	Ri Il-song	14 January 2004 (age 22)	8	1	(DPR Korea Football Association) Ryomyong
11	MF	Yom Chol-gyong	9 August 2004 (age 22)	0	0	(DPR Korea Football Association) Ryomyong
12	DF	Choe Ryong-il	23 March 2004 (age 22)	3	0	(DPR Korea Football Association) Ryomyong
14	MF	Ryang Kwang-myong	26 January 2003 (age 23)	3	1	(DPR Korea Football Association) Amnokgang
15	MF	Ra Myong-song	6 January 2003 (age 23)	3	0	(DPR Korea Football Association) Amnokgang
16	DF	Kim Yu-song	18 July 2003 (age 23)	8	1	(DPR Korea Football Association) Amnokgang
17	FW	Choe Kuk	21 March 2005 (age 21)	3	1	(DPR Korea Football Association) Wolmido
18	GK	Kim Ryong-ik	13 March 2003 (age 23)	3	0	(DPR Korea Football Association) Sobaeksu
19	DF	Hong Kwon-hwi	2 March 2003 (age 23)	0	0	(DPR Korea Football Association) Kyonggongopsong
20	FW	Paek Chung-song*	25 February 2000 (age 26)	5	0	(DPR Korea Football Association) Ryomyong
21	GK	Hong Tae-han	30 January 2005 (age 21)	0	0	(DPR Korea Football Association) Ryomyong
22	MF	Kim Kuk-bom*	19 February 1995 (age 31)	21	3	(DPR Korea Football Association) April 25
23	MF	An Kyong-ung	22 February 2004 (age 22)	3	2	(DPR Korea Football Association) Wolmido

* Over-aged player.

=== United Arab Emirates ===
United Arab Emirates announced their final squad on 12 September.

Head coach: (Croatia) Igor Bišćan

No.	Pos.	Player	Date of birth (age)	Caps	Goals	Club
1	GK	Saeed Maqdami	21 August 2004 (aged 22)	0	0	(United Arab Emirates Football Association) Al-Nasr
2	DF	Mubarak Zamah	29 November 2003 (aged 22)	10	0	(United Arab Emirates Football Association) Baniyas
3	DF	Leonard Amesimeku	25 November 2003 (aged 22)	3	0	(United Arab Emirates Football Association) Al Dhafra
4	DF	Khamis Al-Mansoori	15 January 2004 (aged 22)	13	1	(United Arab Emirates Football Association) Baniyas
5	DF	Mansour Al-Balushi	19 January 2005 (aged 21)	1	0	(United Arab Emirates Football Association) Al Ain
6	MF	Matar Zaal	2 March 2004 (aged 22)	9	0	(United Arab Emirates Football Association) Sharjah
7	MF	Saif Al-Kaabi	14 February 2005 (aged 21)	0	0	(United Arab Emirates Football Association) Sharjah
8	MF	Ali Abdulaziz	16 July 2003 (aged 23)	14	2	(United Arab Emirates Football Association) Al-Nasr
9	FW	Mohammad Juma	30 May 2006 (aged 20)	5	4	(United Arab Emirates Football Association) Shabab Al Ahli
10	FW	Yahya Al-Ghassani* (captain)	18 April 1998 (aged 28)	3	0	(United Arab Emirates Football Association) Shabab Al Ahli
11	FW	Ahmed Al-Shammari	19 April 2005 (aged 21)	0	0	(United Arab Emirates Football Association) Al-Nasr
12	DF	Bader Nasser*	16 September 2001 (aged 25)	0	0	(United Arab Emirates Football Association) Shabab Al Ahli
13	DF	Yousif Al-Marzooqi	7 March 2005 (aged 21)	0	0	(United Arab Emirates Football Association) Al Dhafra
14	DF	Solomon Sosu	5 March 2005 (aged 21)	10	1	(United Arab Emirates Football Association) Baniyas
15	DF	Mackenzie Hunt*	14 November 2001 (aged 24)	0	0	(United Arab Emirates Football Association) Baniyas
16	FW	Junior Ndiaye	29 March 2005 (aged 21)	10	6	(French Football Federation) Valenciennes
17	GK	Rashed Salem	20 November 2005 (aged 20)	0	0	(United Arab Emirates Football Association) United FC
18	DF	Mansour Burghash	12 November 2004 (aged 21)	6	0	(United Arab Emirates Football Association) Al Wahda
19	DF	Nahyan Al-Memari	23 September 2005 (aged 21)	0	0	(United Arab Emirates Football Association) Al Ain
20	FW	Mansoor Al-Menhali	29 March 2003 (aged 23)	15	7	(United Arab Emirates Football Association) Palm City
21	FW	Mayed Saeed	6 May 2003 (aged 23)	9	5	(United Arab Emirates Football Association) Sharjah
22	GK	Khaled Tawhid	16 February 2004 (aged 22)	8	0	(United Arab Emirates Football Association) Sharjah
23	FW	Hazem Mohammad	18 March 2005 (aged 21)	10	0	(United Arab Emirates Football Association) Al Ain

* Over-aged player.

== Group C ==
=== Vietnam ===
Vietnam announced their final squad on 9 September. Phạm Đình Hải and Nguyễn Công Phương withdrew on 11 September and were replace by Nguyễn Bảo Ngọc and Hoàng Quang Dũng.

Head coach: Đinh Hồng Vinh

No.	Pos.	Player	Date of birth (age)	Caps	Goals	Club
1	GK	Cao Văn Bình	8 January 2005 (age 21)	15	0	(Vietnam Football Federation) Sông Lam Nghệ An
2	DF	Nguyễn Lương Tuấn Khải	14 November 2006 (age 19)	0	0	(Vietnam Football Federation) Huế
3	DF	Phạm Lý Đức (captain)	14 February 2003 (age 23)	20	1	(Vietnam Football Federation) Công An Nhân Dân
4	DF	Lê Nguyên Hoàng	14 February 2005 (age 21)	15	0	(Vietnam Football Federation) Sông Lam Nghệ An
5	DF	Nguyễn Đức Anh	16 May 2003 (age 23)	14	0	(Vietnam Football Federation) Hà Nội
6	MF	Nguyễn Hoàng Khanh	26 March 2006 (age 20)	0	0	(Vietnam Football Federation) Thể Công-Viettel
7	FW	Nguyễn Thanh Nhàn	28 July 2003 (age 23)	33	5	(Vietnam Football Federation) Công An Nhân Dân
8	MF	Nguyễn Thái Quốc Cường	6 March 2004 (age 22)	16	0	(Vietnam Football Federation) Công An HCMC
9	FW	Nguyễn Quốc Việt	4 May 2003 (age 23)	44	9	(Vietnam Football Federation) Ninh Bình
10	MF	Hoàng Quang Dũng	18 February 2005 (age 21)	0	0	(Vietnam Football Federation) Huế
11	MF	Lê Văn Thuận	15 July 2006 (age 20)	22	3	(Vietnam Football Federation) Ninh Bình
12	MF	Nguyễn Xuân Bắc	3 February 2003 (age 23)	24	1	(Vietnam Football Federation) Công An Nhân Dân
13	GK	Nguyễn Bảo Ngọc	28 March 2007 (age 19)	0	0	(Vietnam Football Federation) Sông Lam Nghệ An
14	MF	Nguyễn Quang Vinh	27 January 2005 (age 21)	3	0	(Vietnam Football Federation) Sông Lam Nghệ An
15	DF	Đặng Tuấn Phong	7 February 2003 (age 23)	8	0	(Vietnam Football Federation) Hải Phòng
16	FW	Nguyễn Lê Phát	12 January 2007 (age 19)	10	2	(Vietnam Football Federation) Ninh Bình
17	MF	Nguyễn Phi Hoàng	27 March 2003 (age 23)	28	0	(Vietnam Football Federation) Công An HCMC
18	DF	Đinh Quang Kiệt	16 July 2007 (age 19)	2	0	(Vietnam Football Federation) Công An HCMC
19	FW	Nguyễn Ngọc Mỹ	20 February 2004 (age 22)	14	1	(Vietnam Football Federation) Ninh Bình
20	DF	Nguyễn Quốc Toản	8 January 2006 (age 20)	3	0	(Vietnam Football Federation) Quy Nhơn United
21	MF	Phạm Minh Phúc	7 February 2004 (age 22)	19	3	(Vietnam Football Federation) Công An Nhân Dân
22	MF	Lê Đình Long Vũ	27 May 2006 (age 20)	7	0	(Vietnam Football Federation) Sông Lam Nghệ An
23	GK	Hoa Xuân Tín	29 January 2008 (age 18)	0	0	(Vietnam Football Federation) Công An HCMC

=== Uzbekistan ===
Uzbekistan announced their final squad on 8 September 2026.

Head coach: Ravshan Khaydarov

No.	Pos.	Player	Date of birth (age)	Club
1	GK	Maksim Murkaev	21 February 2005 (aged 21)	(Uzbekistan Football Association) Pakhtakor
2	DF	Saidkhon Khamidov	20 January 2005 (aged 21)	(Uzbekistan Football Association) Olympic MobiUz
3	DF	Dilshod Murtazaev	20 September 2006 (aged 19)	(Uzbekistan Football Association) Nasaf
4	DF	Giyosjon Rizakulov	20 February 2005 (aged 21)	(Uzbekistan Football Association) Qizilqum
5	DF	Kuvonch Khushvaktov	14 April 2006 (aged 20)	(Uzbekistan Football Association) Nasaf
6	MF	Ravshan Khayrullaev	21 August 2005 (aged 21)	(Uzbekistan Football Association) Bukhara
7	MF	Sardorbek Bakhromov	16 February 2005 (aged 21)	(Uzbekistan Football Association) Nasaf
8	FW	Amirbek Saidov	1 February 2005 (aged 21)	(Uzbekistan Football Association) Sogdiana
9	MF	Saidumarkhon Saidnurullaev	13 April 2005 (aged 21)	(Uzbekistan Football Association) Metallurg Bekabad
10	MF	Mukhammadali Urinboev	24 April 2005 (aged 21)	(Royal Belgian Football Association) Royal Antwerp
11	MF	Asilbek Jumaev	25 March 2005 (aged 21)	(Uzbekistan Football Association) Neftchi Fergana
12	GK	Umar Rustamov	6 May 2005 (aged 21)	(Uzbekistan Football Association) Olympic MobiUz
13	MF	Azizbek Tulkinbekov	10 February 2007 (aged 19)	(Uzbekistan Football Association) Bunyodkor
14	DF	Ruziboy Fayzullaev	16 October 2005 (aged 20)	(Uzbekistan Football Association) Olympic MobiUz
15	DF	Diyor Abdunazarov	22 February 2005 (aged 21)	(Uzbekistan Football Association) Nasaf
16	MF	Mukhammadali Reimov	20 May 2006 (aged 20)	(Uzbekistan Football Association) Lokomotiv Tashkent
17	FW	Firdavs Abdurakhmanov	29 March 2005 (aged 21)	(Uzbekistan Football Association) Dinamo Samarqand
18	MF	Oybek Urmonjonov	9 October 2006 (aged 19)	(Uzbekistan Football Association) Dinamo Samarqand
19	MF	Ollobergan Karimov	17 June 2006 (aged 20)	(Uzbekistan Football Association) Sogdiana
20	DF	Dilshod Abdullaev	9 May 2006 (aged 20)	(Uzbekistan Football Association) Pakhtakor
21	GK	Samandar Muratbaev	3 March 2005 (aged 21)	(Uzbekistan Football Association) Nasaf
22	FW	Nurlan Ibraimov	29 August 2005 (aged 21)	(Uzbekistan Football Association) Lokomotiv Tashkent
23	FW	Shodiyor Shodiboev	29 March 2006 (aged 20)	(Uzbekistan Football Association) Lokomotiv Tashkent

=== Philippines ===
The Philippines announced their 29-man preliminary squad on 5 September. The final squad was announced on 14 September.

Head coach: (Australia) Garrath McPherson

No.	Pos.	Player	Date of birth (age)	Club
1	GK	Nicholas Guimarães	9 August 2006 (aged 20)	(Japan Football Association) Machida Zelvia
2	DF	Bryan Villanueva	30 July 2006 (aged 20)	Free agent
3	DF	Gabriel Guimarães	9 August 2006 (aged 20)	(Philippine Football Federation) Kaya–Iloilo
4	DF	Kamil Amirul	6 February 2004 (aged 22)	(Philippine Football Federation) Dynamic Herb Cebu
5	DF	Josh Meriño	11 February 2005 (aged 21)	(Philippine Football Federation) UP Fighting Maroons
6	MF	Sandro Reyes	29 March 2003 (aged 23)	Free agent
7	MF	Scott Woods*	7 May 2000 (aged 26)	(Football Federation of Cambodia) Boeung Ket
8	MF	Gavin Muens	24 October 2004 (aged 21)	Free agent
9	FW	Andres Aldeguer	18 December 2003 (aged 22)	(Philippine Football Federation) One Taguig
10	MF	John Lucero	1 December 2003 (aged 22)	(Philippine Football Federation) One Taguig
11	MF	Dov Cariño	18 December 2003 (aged 22)	(Philippine Football Federation) Ateneo Blue Booters
12	GK	Alfonso Gonzalez	5 January 2005 (aged 21)	(Philippine Football Federation) UP Fighting Maroons
13	MF	Ryen Lim	9 July 2005 (aged 21)	(Philippine Football Federation) One Taguig
14	DF	Jaime Rosquillo	10 March 2003 (aged 23)	(Philippine Football Federation) Dynamic Herb Cebu
15	MF	Ethan Smith	2 June 2006 (aged 20)	(The Football Association) Notts County U21
16	MF	Jared Peña	5 August 2006 (aged 20)	(United States Soccer Federation) Walsh Cavaliers
17	DF	Brian McManus Jr.	26 June 2005 (aged 21)	(United States Soccer Federation) North Florida Ospreys
18	MF	Michael Baldisimo*	13 April 2000 (aged 26)	(Canadian Soccer Association) Cavalry
19	DF	Christian Rontini*	20 July 1999 (aged 27)	(Italian Football Federation) Antella
20	DF	Antoine Ortega	12 May 2003 (aged 23)	(Philippine Football Federation) Kaya–Iloilo
21	DF	Santiago Rublico	18 August 2005 (aged 21)	(Royal Spanish Football Federation) Alcorcón B
22	FW	Aidan Astilla	1 January 2006 (aged 20)	(United States Soccer Federation) CSUMB Otters
23	GK	Patrick Dye	11 July 2004 (aged 22)	(United States Soccer Federation) ONU Tigers

* Over-aged player.

=== Kuwait ===
Kuwait announced their final squad on 7 September.

Head coach: (Spain) David Dóniga

== Group D ==
=== South Korea ===
South Korea announced their final squad on 9 July.

Head coach: Lee Min-sung

No.	Pos.	Player	Date of birth (age)	Club
1	GK	Kim Jun-hong	3 June 2003 (age 23)	(Korea Football Association) Suwon Samsung Bluewings
2	DF	Kang Min-jun	8 April 2003 (age 23)	(Korea Football Association) Pohang Steelers
3	DF	Choi Woo-jin	18 July 2004 (age 22)	(Korea Football Association) Jeonbuk Hyundai Motors
4	DF	Park Seong-hoon	27 January 2003 (age 23)	(Korea Football Association) FC Seoul
5	DF	Kim Ji-soo	24 December 2004 (age 21)	(The Football Association) Brentford
6	MF	Lee Gi-hyuk*	7 July 2000 (age 26)	(Korea Football Association) Gangwon FC
7	MF	Eom Ji-sung*	9 May 2002 (age 24)	(Football Association of Wales) Swansea City
8	MF	Lee Seung-won	6 March 2003 (age 23)	(Korea Football Association) Gangwon FC
9	FW	Lee Young-jun	23 May 2003 (age 23)	(Swiss Football Association) Grasshopper
10	MF	Bae Jun-ho	21 August 2003 (age 23)	(The Football Association) Stoke City
11	MF	Yang Hyun-jun*	25 May 2002 (age 24)	(Scottish Football Association) Celtic
12	GK	Kim Min-seung	9 February 2005 (age 21)	(Korea Football Association) Paju Frontier
13	MF	Kang Sang-yoon	31 May 2004 (age 22)	(Korea Football Association) Jeonbuk Hyundai Motors
14	MF	Lee Hyun-ju	7 February 2003 (age 23)	(Portuguese Football Federation) Arouca
15	MF	Hwang Do-yun	9 April 2003 (age 23)	(Korea Football Association) FC Seoul
16	DF	Choi Seok-hyun	13 January 2003 (age 23)	(Korea Football Association) Ulsan HD
17	MF	Yang Min-hyeok	16 April 2006 (age 20)	(Royal Belgian Football Association) Westerlo
18	FW	Kim Myung-jun	21 March 2006 (age 20)	(Royal Belgian Football Association) Jong Genk
19	MF	Park Seung-soo	17 March 2007 (age 19)	(The Football Association) Newcastle United U21
20	DF	Park Gyeong-seop	2 July 2004 (age 22)	(Korea Football Association) Incheon United
21	GK	Lee Seung-hwan	5 April 2003 (age 23)	(Korea Football Association) Chungbuk Cheongju
22	DF	Bae Hyun-seo	16 February 2005 (age 21)	(Korea Football Association) Gyeongnam FC
23	DF	Shin Min-ha	15 September 2005 (age 21)	(Korea Football Association) Gangwon FC

* Over-aged player.

=== Saudi Arabia ===
Saudi Arabia announced their final squad on 2 September.

Head coach: (Italy) Luigi Di Biagio

No.	Pos.	Player	Date of birth (age)	Club
	GK	Yazan Al-Ruwaili	19 May 2005 (age 21)	(Saudi Arabian Football Federation) Al-Hazem
	GK	Mahmoud Al-Burayh	14 February 2006 (age 20)	(Saudi Arabian Football Federation) Al-Fateh
	GK	Abdulrahman Al-Ghamdi	13 February 2006 (age 20)	(Saudi Arabian Football Federation) Al-Taawoun
	DF	Awad Aman	16 January 2005 (age 21)	(Saudi Arabian Football Federation) Al-Nassr
	DF	Yazan Madani	7 February 2005 (age 21)	(Saudi Arabian Football Federation) Al-Kholood
	DF	Awad Dahal	23 February 2005 (age 21)	(Saudi Arabian Football Federation) Al-Riyadh
	DF	Sultan Al-Essa	30 June 2005 (age 21)	(Saudi Arabian Football Federation) Al-Riyadh
	DF	Mohammed Barnawi	7 August 2005 (age 21)	(Saudi Arabian Football Federation) Al-Ittihad
	DF	Abdulaziz Al-Suwailem	24 April 2006 (age 20)	(Saudi Arabian Football Federation) Al-Fateh
	DF	Saad Al-Mutairi	6 December 2006 (age 19)	(Saudi Arabian Football Federation) Al-Hilal
	DF	Meshal Al-Dawood	2 August 2008 (age 18)	(Saudi Arabian Football Federation) Al-Hilal
	MF	Bassam Hazazi	29 March 2005 (age 21)	(Saudi Arabian Football Federation) Al-Nassr
	MF	Ali Al-Hussain	4 June 2005 (age 21)	(Saudi Arabian Football Federation) Al-Fayha
	MF	Rakan Al-Ghamdi	6 September 2005 (age 21)	(Saudi Arabian Football Federation) Al-Nassr
	FW	Ziyad Mallah	9 October 2005 (age 20)	(Saudi Arabian Football Federation) Al-Ahli
	MF	Farhah Al-Shamrani	27 February 2006 (age 20)	(Saudi Arabian Football Federation) Al-Ittihad
	MF	Amar Al-Yuhaybi	3 March 2006 (age 20)	(Saudi Arabian Football Federation) Al-Qadsiah
	MF	Eyad Houssa	21 November 2006 (age 19)	(Saudi Arabian Football Federation) Al-Qadsiah
	MF	Sabri Dahal	29 February 2008 (age 18)	(Saudi Arabian Football Federation) Al-Hilal
	MF	Abdulaziz Al-Fawaz	28 March 2008 (age 18)	(Saudi Arabian Football Federation) Al-Fateh
	FW	Turki Al-Ghumayl	2 February 2005 (age 21)	(Saudi Arabian Football Federation) Al-Hilal
	FW	Saad Haqawi	8 October 2005 (age 20)	(Saudi Arabian Football Federation) Al-Nassr
	FW	Thamer Al-Khaibari	3 December 2005 (age 20)	(Saudi Arabian Football Federation) Al-Khaleej

=== Qatar ===
Qatar announced their final squad on 11 September.

Head coach: (Spain) José Ángel Ziganda

No.	Pos.	Player	Date of birth (age)	Caps	Goals	Club
	GK	Abubaker Osman	25 September 2005 (age 20)	1	0	(Qatar Football Association) Qatar U-23
	GK	Jalal Amir	26 February 2006 (age 20)	0	0	(Qatar Football Association) Qatar U-23
	GK	Mohamed Lingliz	9 March 2005 (age 21)	0	0	(Qatar Football Association) Al Ahli
	DF	Marwan Sherif	1 March 2006 (age 20)	4	0	(Qatar Football Association) Al-Arabi
	DF	Zaid Burhan	4 September 2005 (age 21)	0	0	(Qatar Football Association) Qatar U-23
	DF	Ghanem Al-Minhali	27 June 2006 (age 20)	0	0	(Qatar Football Association) Al-Ahli
	DF	Ali Shahabi	29 January 2006 (age 20)	0	0	(Qatar Football Association) Qatar U-23
	DF	Aatif El-Amin	21 February 2006 (age 20)	0	0	(Qatar Football Association) Qatar U-23
	DF	Yousef Al-Nizami	16 April 2006 (age 20)	0	0	(Qatar Football Association) Qatar U-23
	DF	Al-Waleed Al-Hausawi	1 October 2006 (age 19)	0	0	(Qatar Football Association) Qatar U-23
	DF	Qais Al-Rawi	5 January 2007 (age 19)	0	0	(Qatar Football Association) Al-Rayyan
	MF	Moath Taha	12 October 2005 (age 20)	7	1	(Qatar Football Association) Qatar U-23
	MF	Yamaan Jarrar	28 November 2005 (age 20)	2	0	(Qatar Football Association) Qatar U-23
	MF	Ziyad Fadi	3 July 2005 (age 21)	0	0	(Qatar Football Association) Lusail
	MF	Nawaf Al-Yahri	3 January 2006 (age 20)	0	0	(Qatar Football Association) Qatar U-23
	MF	Faisal Al-Mukahal	21 April 2006 (age 20)	0	0	(Qatar Football Association) Al-Sadd
	MF	Mohamed Ali Chakari	7 May 2006 (age 20)	0	0	(Qatar Football Association) Qatar U-23
	MF	Bassam Adel Eid	25 September 2006 (age 19)	0	0	(Qatar Football Association) Qatar U-23
	MF	Tameem Al-Qadi	19 May 2008 (age 18)	0	0	(Qatar Football Association) Al Sadd
	FW	Mohamed Khaled Gouda	26 January 2005 (age 21)	14	1	(Qatar Football Association) Al-Arabi
	FW	Mohamed Hani Faragalla	10 October 2005 (age 20)	1	0	(Qatar Football Association) Qatar U-23
	FW	Nasser Bahiker	26 August 2006 (age 20)	0	0	(Qatar Football Association) Qatar U-23
	FW	Jassem Al-Hamad	8 November 2006 (age 19)	0	0	(Qatar Football Association) Qatar U-23

== See also ==
- Football at the 2026 Asian Games – Women's team squads
