= 2025 AFC U-20 Asian Cup =

2025年亚足联U-20亚洲杯

Tournament details
- Host country: China
- Dates: 12 February – 1 March
- Teams: 16 (from 1 confederation)
- Venues: 4 (in 1 host city)

Final positions
- Champions: Australia (1st title)
- Runners-up: Saudi Arabia

Tournament statistics
- Matches played: 31
- Goals scored: 93 (3 per match)
- Attendance: 44,626 (1,440 per match)
- Top scorer(s): (South Korea) Kim Tae-won (Uzbekistan) Mukhammadali Urinboev (4 goals each)
- Best player: (Australia) Alex Badolato
- Best goalkeeper: (Saudi Arabia) Hamed Al-Shanqiti
- Fair play award: Australia

The 2025 AFC U-20 Asian Cup was the 42nd edition of the AFC U-20 Asian Cup (including previous editions of the AFC Youth Championship and AFC U-19 Championship), the biennial international youth football championship organised by the Asian Football Confederation (AFC) for the men's under-20 national teams of Asia.

On 24 May 2024, the AFC announced that China would host the tournament. It was the first of three consecutive AFC U-20 Asian Cups to be held in China, preceding the 2027 and 2029 tournaments.

A total of 16 teams played in the tournament, with players born on or after 1 January 2005 eligible to participate. The top four teams qualified for the 2025 FIFA U-20 World Cup in Chile as the AFC representatives.

Uzbekistan were the title holders, having won the title in 2023. They were eliminated on penalties by South Korea in the quarter-finals. Australia clinched their first major youth title since joining the AFC, overcoming three-time winners Saudi Arabia on penalties.

== Qualification ==
Qualification matches were played between 21 and 29 September 2024.

=== Qualified teams ===
A total of 16 teams, including hosts China, qualified for the final tournament.

Team	Qualified as	Appearance	Previous best performance
China	Hosts	20th	Champions (1985)
Syria	Group A winners	12th	Champions (1994)
Uzbekistan	Group B winners	9th	Champions (2023)
South Korea	Group C winners	40th	Champions (1959, 1960, 1963, 1978, 1980, 1982, 1990, 1996, 1998, 2002, 2004, 2012)
Saudi Arabia	Group D winners	15th	Champions (1986, 1992, 2018)
North Korea	Group E winners	14th	Champions (1976, 2006, 2010)
Indonesia	Group F winners	20th	Champions (1961)
Iran	Group G winners	22nd	Champions (1973, 1974, 1975, 1976)
Iraq	Group H winners	19th	Champions (1975, 1977, 1978, 1988, 2000)
Japan	Group I winners	39th	Champions (2016)
Qatar	Group J winners	16th	Champions (2014)
Yemen	1st best runners-up	8th	Quarter-finals (1975)
Kyrgyzstan	2nd best runners-up	3rd	Group stage (2006, 2023)
Australia	3rd best runners-up	9th	Runners-up (2010)
Thailand	4th best runners-up	34th	Champions (1962, 1969)
Jordan	5th best runners-up	9th	Fourth place (2006)

== Venues ==
The competition was held in four venues around Shenzhen.

Shenzhen
Bao'an	Guangming		Longhua
Bao'an Stadium	Shenzhen Youth Football Training Base Centre Stadium	Shenzhen Youth Football Training Base Pitch No.1	Longhua Cultural and Sports Center
Capacity: 40,000	Capacity: 10,000	Capacity: 500	Capacity: 2,364
2025 AFC U-20 Asian Cup is located in China

== Match officials ==
The tournament implemented video assistant referees (VAR), a first in the tournament's history, starting from the semi-finals onwards.

Referees

- (Australia) Alex King
- (Bahrain) Ammar Mahfoodh
- (China) Shen Yinhao
- (Indonesia) Thoriq Alkatiri
- (Iraq) Zaid Thamer Mohammed
- (Japan) Hiroki Kasahara
- (Kuwait) Abdullah Jamali
- (Oman) Qasim Al-Hatmi
- (Qatar) Abdulhadi Al-Rowaily
- (South Korea) Choi Hyun-jai
- (United Arab Emirates) Ahmed Eisa Darwish
- (Uzbekistan) Asker Nadjafaliev

Assistant referees

- (Australia) James Lindsay
- (Bahrain) Mohamed Salman
- (China) Guo Jingtao
- (China) Luo Zheng
- (Hong Kong) So Kai Man
- (Indonesia) Bangbang Syamsudar
- (Iraq) Hayder Ubaydee
- (Japan) Takagi Takumi
- (Kuwait) Ali Jraq
- (Oman) Nasser Al-Busaidi
- (Qatar) Khaled Khalaf
- (South Korea) Cheon Jin-hee
- (Tajikistan) Ismoil Nuraliev
- (Thailand) Kijsathit Pattarapong
- (United Arab Emirates) Yasser Al-Murshidi
- (Uzbekistan) Ruslan Serazitdinov

== Draw ==
The draw of the final tournament was held on 7 November 2024 in Shenzhen, China. The 16 teams were drawn into four groups of four teams, with the teams seeded according to their performance in the 2023 AFC U-20 Asian Cup final tournament and qualification, with the hosts China automatically seeded and assigned to Position A1 in the draw.

Pot 1	Pot 2	Pot 3	Pot 4
1. China (hosts); 2. Uzbekistan; 3. Iraq; 4. Japan	5. South Korea; 6. Australia; 7. Iran; 8. Jordan	9. Indonesia; 10. Saudi Arabia; 11. Syria; 12. Kyrgyzstan	13. Qatar; 14. Thailand; 15. Yemen; 16. North Korea

== Squads ==
Players born on or after 1 January 2005 and on or before 31 December 2009 were eligible to compete in the tournament. Each team must register a squad of minimum 18 players and maximum 23 players, minimum three of whom must be goalkeepers.

== Group stage ==
Tiebreakers

Teams were ranked according to points (3 points for a win, 1 point for a draw, 0 points for a loss), and if tied on points, the following tie-breaking criteria were applied, in the order given, to determine the rankings:

1. Points in head-to-head matches among tied teams;
2. Goal difference in head-to-head matches among tied teams;
3. Goals scored in head-to-head matches among tied teams;
4. If more than two teams are tied, and after applying all head-to-head criteria above, a subset of teams are still tied, all head-to-head criteria above are reapplied exclusively to this subset of teams;
5. Goal difference in all group matches;
6. Goals scored in all group matches;
7. Penalty shoot-out if only two teams were tied and they met in the last round of the group;
8. Disciplinary points (yellow card = 1 point, red card as a result of two yellow cards = 3 points, direct red card = 3 points, yellow card followed by direct red card = 4 points);
9. Drawing of lots.

All match times are in local time, (UTC+8)

=== Group A ===
Pos	Team	Pld	W	D	L	GF	GA	GD	Pts	Qualification
1	Australia	3	3	0	0	10	3	+7	9	Knockout stage
2	China (H)	3	2	0	1	8	5	+3	6	Knockout stage
3	Qatar	3	1	0	2	6	5	+1	3	
4	Kyrgyzstan	3	0	0	3	3	14	−11	0	

Source: AFC
Rules for classification: Tiebreakers
(H) Hosts
12 February 2025
17:15

Australia	5–1	Kyrgyzstan
Jovanovic 4', 61'; Bennie 15'; Touré 26', 31'	Report	Almazbekov 73' (pen.)

Bao'an Stadium, Shenzhen
Attendance: 655
Referee: Choi Hyun-jai (South Korea)
12 February 2025
19:30

China	2–1	Qatar
Kuai Jiwen 17'; Liu Chengyu 21'	Report	Faragalla 55'

Shenzhen Youth Football Training Base Centre Stadium, Shenzhen
Attendance: 5,152
Referee: Qasim Al-Hatmi (Oman)

15 February 2025
17:15

Qatar	1–3	Australia
Gouda 19'	Report	Badolato 24'; Bosnjak 52'; Bennie 69'

Shenzhen Youth Football Training Base Centre Stadium, Shenzhen
Attendance: 1,072
Referee: Zaid Thamer Mohammed (Iraq)
15 February 2025
19:30

Kyrgyzstan	2–5	China
Madaminov 25'; Madanov 64'	Report	Liu Chengyu 13'; Wang Yudong 45' (pen.); Mao Weijie 49'; Zhu Pengyu 80', 90+2'

Bao'an Stadium, Shenzhen
Attendance: 7,944
Referee: Thoriq Alkatiri (Indonesia)

18 February 2025
19:30

China	1–2	Australia
Kuai Jiwen 29'	Report	Memeti 23'; Agosti 25'

Bao'an Stadium, Shenzhen
Attendance: 8,743
Referee: Abdullah Jamali (Kuwait)
18 February 2025
19:30

Kyrgyzstan	0–4	Qatar
	Report	Jamshid 28'; Taha 45+5'; Gouda 55'; Tamer 83'

Shenzhen Youth Football Training Base Centre Stadium, Shenzhen
Attendance: 267
Referee: Hiroki Kasahara (Japan)

=== Group B ===
Pos	Team	Pld	W	D	L	GF	GA	GD	Pts	Qualification
1	Saudi Arabia	3	2	0	1	3	2	+1	6	Knockout stage
2	Iraq	3	1	2	0	2	1	+1	5	Knockout stage
3	Jordan	3	1	1	1	2	2	0	4	
4	North Korea	3	0	1	2	3	5	−2	1	

Source: AFC
Rules for classification: Tiebreakers
13 February 2025
15:00

Iraq	1–1	North Korea
Luay 32'	Report	Kim Jin-song 62'

Longhua Cultural and Sports Center, Shenzhen
Attendance: 266
Referee: Abdullah Jamali (Kuwait)
13 February 2025
19:30

Jordan	0–1	Saudi Arabia
	Report	Haqawi 46'

Bao'an Stadium, Shenzhen
Attendance: 472
Referee: Ahmed Eisa Darwish (United Arab Emirates)

16 February 2025
15:00

North Korea	1–2	Jordan
Ri Jong-dok 83' (pen.)	Report	Sabra 6', 72'

Longhua Cultural and Sports Center, Shenzhen
Attendance: 603
Referee: Alex King (Australia)
16 February 2025
19:30

Saudi Arabia	0–1	Iraq
	Report	Faisal 25'

Bao'an Stadium, Shenzhen
Attendance: 827
Referee: Qasim Al-Hatmi (Oman)

19 February 2025
15:00

Iraq	0–0	Jordan
	Report

Longhua Cultural and Sports Center, Shenzhen
Attendance: 310
Referee: Asker Nadjafaliev (Uzbekistan)
19 February 2025
15:00

Saudi Arabia	2–1	North Korea
Haqawi 51'; Al-Khaibri 85'	Report	Han Jae-yong 28'

Bao'an Stadium, Shenzhen
Attendance: 412
Referee: Ammar Mahfoodh (Bahrain)

=== Group C ===
Pos	Team	Pld	W	D	L	GF	GA	GD	Pts	Qualification
1	Iran	3	3	0	0	11	1	+10	9	Knockout stage
2	Uzbekistan	3	2	0	1	5	3	+2	6	Knockout stage
3	Indonesia	3	0	1	2	1	6	−5	1	
4	Yemen	3	0	1	2	0	7	−7	1	

Source: AFC
Rules for classification: Tiebreakers
13 February 2025
17:15

Uzbekistan	1–0	Yemen
Urinboev 26'	Report

Shenzhen Youth Football Training Base Pitch No.1, Shenzhen
Attendance: 179
Referee: Shen Yinhao (China)
13 February 2025
19:30

Iran	3–0	Indonesia
Nafari 5'; Gholizadeh 63'; Dehghan 70'	Report

Shenzhen Youth Football Training Base Centre Stadium, Shenzhen
Attendance: 356
Referee: Hiroki Kasahara (Japan)

16 February 2025
17:15

Yemen	0–6	Iran
	Report	Zamani 26', 34'; Gholizadeh 42'; Moqbel 45+2' (o.g.); Ghandipour 46'; Zoleikhaei 72'

Shenzhen Youth Football Training Base Pitch No.1, Shenzhen
Attendance: 224
Referee: Choi Hyun-jai (South Korea)
16 February 2025
19:30

Indonesia	1–3	Uzbekistan
Raven 23'	Report	Urinboev 21'; Khaydarov 47'; Saidnurullaev 63'

Shenzhen Youth Football Training Base Centre Stadium, Shenzhen
Attendance: 510
Referee: Abdullah Jamali (Kuwait)

19 February 2025
19:30

Uzbekistan	1–2	Iran
Urinboev 81'	Report	Mazraeh 52'; Gholizadeh 66' (pen.)

Shenzhen Youth Football Training Base Pitch No.1, Shenzhen
Attendance: 252
Referee: Zaid Thamer Mohammed (Iraq)
19 February 2025
19:30

Indonesia	0–0	Yemen
	Report

Shenzhen Youth Football Training Base Centre Stadium, Shenzhen
Attendance: 236
Referee: Abdulhadi Al-Ruaile (Qatar)

=== Group D ===
Pos	Team	Pld	W	D	L	GF	GA	GD	Pts	Qualification
1	South Korea	3	2	1	0	7	3	+4	7	Knockout stage
2	Japan	3	1	2	0	6	3	+3	5	Knockout stage
3	Syria	3	0	2	1	5	6	−1	2	
4	Thailand	3	0	1	2	3	9	−6	1	

Source: AFC
Rules for classification: Tiebreakers
14 February 2025
15:00

South Korea	2–1	Syria
Shin Sung 8'; Baek Min-gyu 23'	Report	Abdi 60'

Longhua Cultural and Sports Center, Shenzhen
Attendance: 363
Referee: Ammar Mahfoodh (Bahrain)
14 February 2025
17:15

Japan	3–0	Thailand
Ishii 14'; Ichihara 33' (pen.); Sato 69'	Report

Shenzhen Youth Football Training Base Pitch No.1, Shenzhen
Attendance: 184
Referee: Abdulhadi Al-Ruaile (Qatar)

17 February 2025
15:00

Syria	2–2	Japan
Al-Mustafa 10'; Soufi 33'	Report	Ozeki 24'; Takaoka 85'

Longhua Cultural and Sports Center, Shenzhen
Attendance: 468
Referee: Ahmed Eisa Darwish (United Arab Emirates)
17 February 2025
17:15

Thailand	1–4	South Korea
Yotsakorn 23'	Report	Yoon Do-young 32'; Kim Tae-won 59', 86'; Park Seung-soo 89'

Shenzhen Youth Football Training Base Pitch No.1, Shenzhen
Attendance: 165
Referee: Asker Nadjafaliev (Uzbekistan)

20 February 2025
15:00

Japan	1–1	South Korea
Kanda 28'	Report	Kim Tae-won 90+1'

Shenzhen Youth Football Training Base Pitch No.1, Shenzhen
Attendance: 310
Referee: Alex King (Australia)
20 February 2025
15:00

Syria	2–2	Thailand
Al-Kalou 52'; Al-Mustafa 71'	Report	Thanawut 73', 81'

Longhua Cultural and Sports Center, Shenzhen
Attendance: 277
Referee: Thoriq Alkatiri (Indonesia)

== Knockout stage ==
In the knockout stage, extra time and penalty shoot-out were used to decide the winner if necessary.

=== Bracket ===
Quarter-finals
22 February
Australia	3
Iraq	2
23 February
Iran	1 (3)
Japan (p)	1 (4)
22 February
Saudi Arabia	1
China	0
23 February
South Korea (p)	3 (3)
Uzbekistan	3 (1)

Semi-finals
26 February
Australia	2
Japan	0
26 February
Saudi Arabia (p)	0 (3)
South Korea	0 (2)

Final
1 March
Australia (p)	1 (5)
Saudi Arabia	1 (4)

=== Quarter-finals ===
All four winners qualified for the 2025 FIFA U-20 World Cup.

22 February 2025
16:15

Saudi Arabia	1–0	China
Al-Yuhaybi 90+5'	Report

Shenzhen Youth Football Training Base Centre Stadium, Shenzhen
Attendance: 6,058
Referee: Alex King (Australia)

22 February 2025
19:30

Australia	3–2	Iraq
Jovanovic 22'; Kikianis 62'; Badolato 74'	Report	Faisal 15'; Qabeel 26'

Bao'an Stadium, Shenzhen
Attendance: 1,109
Referee: Ammar Mahfoodh (Bahrain)

23 February 2025
16:15

Iran	1–1 (a.e.t.)	Japan
Ghandipour 5'	Report	Ogura 30'
Penalties
Darvishaali (penalty missed); Shahrabadi (penalty missed); Shakouri (penalty scored); Hassani (penalty scored); Andarz (penalty scored)	3–4	(penalty scored) Nakajima; (penalty scored) Takaoka; (penalty missed) Takahashi; (penalty scored) Sato; (penalty scored) Ichihara

Shenzhen Youth Football Training Base Centre Stadium, Shenzhen
Attendance: 1,826
Referee: Abdullah Jamali (Kuwait)

23 February 2025
19:30

South Korea	3–3 (a.e.t.)	Uzbekistan
Shin Min-ha 26', 56'; Kim Tae-won 61'	Report	Jumaev 18'; Urinboev 90'; Khaydarov 90+4'
Penalties
Kim Tae-won (penalty scored); Lee Geon-hee (penalty missed); Shin Min-ha (penalty missed); Kim Ho-jin (penalty scored); Ha Jeong-woo (penalty scored)	3–1	(penalty missed) Karimov; (penalty missed) Khaydarov; (penalty scored) Urinboev; (penalty missed) Komilov

Shenzhen Youth Football Training Base Pitch No.1, Shenzhen
Attendance: 259
Referee: Qasim Al-Hatmi (Oman)

=== Semi-finals ===
26 February 2025
16:15

Saudi Arabia	0–0 (a.e.t.)	South Korea
	Report
Penalties
Al-Khaibari (penalty scored); Barnawi (penalty missed); Al-Shamrani (penalty scored); Al-Tumbukti (penalty missed); Al-Mahdawi (penalty scored)	3–2	(penalty missed) Kim Tae-won; (penalty missed) Lee Chang-woo; (penalty scored) Kim Ho-jin; (penalty scored) Kim Seo-jin; (penalty missed) Kang Min-woo

Shenzhen Youth Football Training Base Centre Stadium, Shenzhen
Attendance: 408
Referee: Asker Nadjafaliev (Uzbekistan)

26 February 2025
19:30

Australia	2–0	Japan
Touré 49'; Pearman 67'	Report

Bao'an Stadium, Shenzhen
Attendance: 1,363
Referee: Abdulhadi Al-Ruaile (Qatar)

=== Final ===
1 March 2025
19:30

Australia	1–1 (a.e.t.)	Saudi Arabia
Agosti 24'	Report	Haji 45+2'
Penalties
Jovanovic (penalty scored); Badolato (penalty scored); Pearman (penalty scored); Yull (penalty scored); Kikianis (penalty scored)	5–4	(penalty scored) Al-Khaibri; (penalty scored) Al-Shamrani; (penalty scored) Al-Mahdawi; (penalty scored) Barnawi; (penalty missed) Hazazi

Bao'an Stadium, Shenzhen
Attendance: 3,355
Referee: Hiroki Kasahara (Japan)

== Goalscorers ==
There were 93 goals scored in 31 matches, for an average of 3 goals per match.

4 goals

- (South Korea) Kim Tae-won
- (Uzbekistan) Mukhammadali Urinboev

3 goals

- (Australia) Luka Jovanovic
- (Australia) Musa Touré
- (Iran) Esmaeil Gholizadeh

2 goals

- (Australia) Alexander Badolato
- (Australia) Daniel Bennie
- (Australia) Louis Agosti
- (China) Kuai Jiwen
- (China) Liu Chengyu
- (China) Zhu Pengyu
- (Iran) Reza Ghandipour
- (Iran) Abolfazl Zamani
- (Iraq) Amoori Faisal
- (Jordan) Ibrahim Sabra
- (Qatar) Mohammed Khaled Gouda
- (Saudi Arabia) Saad Haqawi
- (South Korea) Shin Min-ha
- (Syria) Mohammad Al-Mustafa
- (Thailand) Thanawut Phochai
- (Uzbekistan) Abdugafur Khaydarov

1 goal

- (Australia) Dean Bosnjak
- (Australia) Panagiotis Kikianis
- (Australia) Medin Memeti
- (Australia) Jaylan Pearman
- (China) Mao Weijie
- (China) Wang Yudong
- (Indonesia) Jens Raven
- (Iran) Mobin Dehghan
- (Iran) Yousef Mazraeh
- (Iran) Hesam Nafari
- (Iran) Abolfazl Zoleikhaei
- (Iraq) Aymen Luay
- (Iraq) Mustafa Qabeel
- (Japan) Rion Ichihara
- (Japan) Hisatsugu Ishii
- (Japan) Soma Kanda
- (Japan) Kosei Ogura
- (Japan) Yuto Ozeki
- (Japan) Ryunosuke Sato
- (Japan) Rento Takaoka
- (Kyrgyzstan) Beknaz Almazbekov
- (Kyrgyzstan) Yryskeldi Madanov
- (Kyrgyzstan) Umar Madaminov
- (North Korea) Han Jae-yong
- (North Korea) Kim Jin-song
- (North Korea) Ri Jong-dok
- (Qatar) Mohamed Hani Faragalla
- (Qatar) Tahsin Jamshid
- (Qatar) Moath Taha
- (Qatar) Noureldan Tamer
- (Saudi Arabia) Talal Haji
- (Saudi Arabia) Thamer Al-Khaibri
- (Saudi Arabia) Ammar Al-Yuhaybi
- (South Korea) Baek Min-gyu
- (South Korea) Park Seung-soo
- (South Korea) Shin Sung
- (South Korea) Yoon Do-young
- (Syria) Aland Abdi
- (Syria) Ahmad Al-Kalou
- (Syria) Ahmad Soufi
- (Thailand) Yotsakorn Burapha
- (Uzbekistan) Asilbek Jumaev
- (Uzbekistan) Saidumarkhon Saidnurullaev

1 own goal

- (Yemen) Mohammed Moqbel (against Iran)

== Qualified teams for FIFA U-20 World Cup ==
The following teams from AFC qualified for the 2025 FIFA U-20 World Cup in Chile.

Team	Qualified on	Previous appearances in FIFA U-20 World Cup^{1}
Saudi Arabia	22 February 2025	9 (1985, 1987, 1989, 1993, 1999, 2003, 2011, 2017, 2019)
Australia	22 February 2025	15 (1981, 1983, 1985, 1987, 1991, 1993, 1995, 1997, 1999, 2001, 2003, 2005, 2009, 2011, 2013)
Japan	23 February 2025	11 (1979, 1995, 1997, 1999, 2001, 2003, 2005, 2007, 2017, 2019, 2023)
South Korea	23 February 2025	16 (1979, 1981, 1983, 1991, 1993, 1997, 1999, 2003, 2005, 2007, 2009, 2011, 2013, 2017, 2019, 2023)

^{1} Bold indicates champions for that year. Italic indicates hosts for that year.

== See also ==
- 2025 AFC U-17 Asian Cup
