= Musa Toure =

Australian soccer player (born 2005)

Musa Touré
Personal information
- Date of birth: 12 November 2005 (age 21)
- Place of birth: Darwin, Northern Territory, Australia
- Height: 1.83 m (6 ft 0 in)
- Position: Striker

Team information
- Current team: Macarthur
- Number: 99

Youth career
- 2016–2018: Croydon Kings
- 2019: FFSA NTC
- 2020–2024: Adelaide United

Senior career*
Years	Team	Apps	(Gls)
2021–2024	Adelaide United NPL	52	(19)
2022–2024	Adelaide United	11	(1)
2024–2025	Clermont II	6	(1)
2024–2025	Clermont	2	(0)
2025–2026	Randers	17	(0)
2026–	Macarthur	0	(0)

International career^{‡}
2024–	Australia U20	11	(5)
Medal record
Men's football
Representing Australia
AFC U-20 Asian Cup
Winner	2025 China	Team
- * Club domestic league appearances and goals as of 7 September 2026 ‡ National team caps and goals as of 5 October 2025

Musa Touré (born 12 November 2005) is an Australian professional soccer player who plays as a striker for Macarthur and the Australia under-20 national team.

== Early life ==
Touré was born on 12 November 2005 in Darwin, Australia and is of Liberian descent. His parents, Amara and Mawa Touré, were originally from Frelah, a town in the Salala District of Liberia, before having to flee from the Second Liberian Civil War on 23 May 1990. His family sought refuge in Conakry, Guinea where his two elder brothers were born and eventually settled in Adelaide, South Australia on 26 November 2004.

Raised in the suburbs of Croydon, Touré played football with his two older brothers, Al Hassan and Mohamed, both of whom became professional footballers. His father frequently coached them in a local park close to their home, nurturing their talents and mentality from his experiences as a semi-professional in Guinea and Liberia. Alongside his brothers, he played for Croydon Kings as a junior before transferring to Adelaide United in their youth system. He was considered the most gifted out of the three by Croydon's U18 coach, Steve Pepper.

== Club career ==
=== Adelaide United ===
Following his signing for Adelaide United in 2020, Touré was named for the senior NPL side ahead of the 2020 NPL South Australia season. In his first season, he registered 7 appearances, making his senior debut on 25 July 2020 in a 3–0 defeat to Adelaide Comets before scoring his first goal for the club in a 2–2 draw to MetroStars a week later. His second and third seasons saw him accumulate a further 6 goals in 24 appearances leading him to be called up for pre-season with Adelaide United ahead of the 2022–23 A-League season.

Touré made his first-team debut as a substitute on 9 October 2022 in a 1–1 draw to Wellington Phoenix at Sky Stadium. He signed his first professional contract with the club on 1 March 2023. Following his brief stint in the first-team, he was demoted to the youth squad where he played a vital role in the Young Red's league campaign under Airton Andrioli's system. He scored his sixth goal of the season and added an assist for his side to settle a 2–2 draw with West Adelaide on 6 May.

Touré was recalled into the first team ahead of the 2023–24 A-League season but was ruled out with an ankle injury during the 2023 Australia Cup. He made his first appearance of the campaign on 20 October 2023 in a 3–0 home win against defending champions Central Coast Mariners. He played a part in the third goal, being awarded a free kick that was taken by Bernardo and scored by a header from Nick Ansell. On 29 October 2023, Toure scored his first goal for the club in a 6–0 demolition of Melbourne City, becoming the fifth youngest scorer for Adelaide United and a part of the first brother trio to score for the club.

=== Randers FC ===
On February 3, 2025 it was confirmed that Touré joined Danish Superliga club Randers FC (where his older brother Mohamed also played until February 2026), on a contract to June 2028.

=== Macarthur ===
On 7 September 2026, he moved back to Australia, to play for Macarthur FC.

== Personal life ==
Touré grew up in a tight-knit Islamic family who shared a passion for football. His father was a footballer in Guinea and Liberia before taking the role of a teacher; he had played for AS Manee in the second division of Guinea, with the club president providing him with a house for his family. He is the younger brother to Al Hassan and Mohamed Touré, both of whom made league appearances for Adelaide United. His younger sister, Miriam, plays in the youth league of Women NPL and his two younger brothers, Bilal and Idris, are playing in the NPL youth league. His uncle, Ali, was also a prominent footballer who had played in NPL South Australia. Musa and his brothers support English Premier League club Chelsea and have dreamed of playing for the club in the future. For his creativity and talents, he was nicknamed "The Brazilian" by his family.

Touré and his brothers attended Underdale High School, a secondary school located in the western suburb of Underdale, Adelaide.

Touré participated in a charity match on 22 June 2023, organised by his brother Mohamed, to raise money for kids who could not afford to play football in Adelaide.

== Honours ==
Australia U-20

- AFC U-20 Asian Cup: 2025
