= Jaylan Pearman =

Australian soccer player

Personal information
- Full name: Jaylan Bradley Pearman
- Date of birth: 18 April 2006 (age 20)
- Position: Attacking midfielder

Team information
- Current team: Swindon Town (on loan from Queens Park Rangers)
- Number: 22

Senior career*
Years	Team	Apps	(Gls)
2024–2025	Perth Glory	12	(4)
2025–	Queens Park Rangers	0	(0)
2026–	→ Swindon Town (loan)	0	(0)

International career^{‡}
2022–2023	Australia U17	3	(1)
2024–	Australia U20	12	(3)
Medal record
Men's football
Representing Australia
AFC U-20 Asian Cup
Winner	2025 China	Team
- * Club domestic league appearances and goals as of 14 August 2026 ‡ National team caps and goals as of 5 October 2025

Jaylan Bradley Pearman (born 18 April 2006) is an Australian soccer player who plays as an attacking midfielder for EFL League Two club Swindon Town, on loan from EFL Championship side Queens Park Rangers.

== Club career ==
=== Perth Glory ===
Pearman signed a scholarship deal with Perth Glory for the 2023–24 season. His deal was extended for another season in June 2024.

Pearman made his senior debut for the club on 23 July 2024 in the play-off for the Australia Cup, a 4–2 win over Brisbane Roar; he came on as a 74th-minute substitute for David Williams. His first A-League Men game came the following 3 January, assisting the first goal by Adam Taggart in a 3–2 home loss to Western United; he was called the "future of the club" by manager David Zdrilic. Eight days later, he scored the only goal of a win over leaders Auckland FC also at the Perth Rectangular Stadium, in his third league game for the club. In the same month as his professional league debut, he was linked with a move to EFL Championship club Queens Park Rangers.

=== Queens Park Rangers ===
On 19 June 2025, having been previously linked with the club, Pearman completed a move to EFL Championship side Queens Park Rangers, initially joining with the club's Development Squad. He made his debut on 12 August in a 3–2 loss away to Plymouth Argyle in the first round of the EFL Cup, playing the first 86 minutes.

Pearman helped the Development Squad win the 2025–26 London Senior Cup after scoring a hat-trick in the final.

On 14 August 2026, Pearman joined League Two club Swindon Town on a season-long loan deal.

== International career ==
Pearman was one of three Perth players called up for the Australia under-20 team at the 2025 AFC U-20 Asian Cup in China. He scored the second goal of a 2–0 semi-final win over Japan, and a penalty in the 5–4 shootout win over Saudi Arabia in the final on 1 March, as Australia won the title for the first time.

== Honours ==
=== Club ===
Queens Park Rangers Development Squad

- London Senior Cup champions: 2025–26

=== International ===
Australia U-20

- AFC U-20 Asian Cup champions: 2025
