= Daniel Bennie =

Australian soccer player (born 2006)

- Bennie with Dundee United in 2026

Personal information
- Full name: Daniel Ian Bennie
- Date of birth: 13 April 2006 (age 20)
- Place of birth: Hong Kong
- Height: 5 ft 11 in (1.80 m)
- Position: Winger

Team information
- Current team: Dundee United (on loan from Queens Park Rangers)
- Number: 77

Youth career
- 2010–2017: AISHK
- Sorrento FC
- 2019–2020: ECU Joondalup
- 2021–2024: Perth Glory

Senior career*
Years	Team	Apps	(Gls)
2022–2024	Perth Glory NPL	23	(10)
2023–2024	Perth Glory	25	(1)
2024–	Queens Park Rangers	29	(1)
2026–	→ Dundee United (loan)	5	(1)

International career^{‡}
2023	Australia U17	6	(1)
2024–	Australia U20	13	(6)
Medal record
Men's football
Representing Australia
AFC U-20 Asian Cup
Winner	2025 China	Team
- * Club domestic league appearances and goals as of 2 September 2026 ‡ National team caps and goals as of 6 October 2025

Daniel Ian Bennie (Chinese: 丹尼爾·本尼; born 13 April 2006) is a professional soccer player who plays as a winger for Scottish Premiership club Dundee United on loan from EFL Championship club Queens Park Rangers. Born in Hong Kong, he is a youth international for Australia.

== Club career ==
=== Perth Glory ===
Bennie, a youth player in Perth, signed his first professional contract with Perth Glory on 10 July 2023, and made his unofficial debut for the club less than a week later, scoring Perth's second goal in a 6–2 defeat to West Ham. He was one of nine youth players to feature against the Premier League side.

Bennie made his competitive debut as a substitute on 18 July 2023 in a 4–0 cup defeat to Macarthur FC. He made his starting debut on 22 October 2023 at Perth Rectangular Stadium in a 2–2 league draw with Newcastle Jets.

=== Queens Park Rangers ===
On 30 May 2024, Perth Glory announced that Bennie had signed for English club Queens Park Rangers for an undisclosed fee that was rumoured to be around 250 thousand pounds. On 10 August, he made his debut for the club, as a substitute, in a 3–1 loss against West Bromwich Albion in the league. Bennie scored on his Carabao Cup debut in a 3–2 defeat away to Plymouth in Aug 2025. He was also part of the winning team for the 2025 Premier League Cup, beating Brentford 3–1 in the final. In the 25/26 season he scored 8 goals in 10 games for QPR’s reserves before stepping up to the first team. He scored his first league goal in Feb 2026 in a 1–3 away win at Hull.

=== Dundee United ===
On 31 July 2026, Bennie made his debut for Dundee United as a substitute in a Scottish Premiership match against Rangers at Tannadice Park. In the 82nd minute of the 1–1 draw, Bennie threaded a precise, swerving pass with the outside of his boot to put teammate Jesse Randall clean through on goal, though Randall's resulting low effort was smothered by Rangers goalkeeper Ivor Pandur.

== International career ==
Bennie received his first international call-up for the Australian under-17 side in June 2023 ahead of the 2023 U-17 Asian Cup. He scored once during the tournament as Australia reached the quarter-final stage before being knocked out by Japan. Bennie was part of the Australian u20 team that won the Asia Cup for the first time in February 2025 beating Saudi Arabia in the final. Bennie scored twice on the way to the final.

As of February 2025, having not yet been tied to the Australia men's national soccer team, he is potentially eligible for the Hong Kong national football team, having been born in Hong Kong and spent between the ages of 4 to 11 going to school at the Australian International School Hong Kong, where his father, Niall, was the Director of Sport. He also has expressed interest to represent Scotland national football team.

== Personal life ==
Bennie was born in Hong Kong and started playing football at a young age whilst living there, before moving to Perth. His brother Jack Bennie is also a football player for HKFC.

Bennie attended Lake Joondalup Baptist College in Joondalup, where he met John Walmsley, the head coach of Perth Glory Youth.

== Honours ==
Australia U-20

- AFC U-20 Asian Cup Champions: 2025
