= Park Gyeong-seop =

South Korean footballer (born 2004)

- Park in September 2025

Personal information
- Date of birth: 2 July 2004 (age 22)
- Place of birth: Gangneung, South Korea
- Height: 1.88 m (6 ft 2 in)
- Positions: Centre-back; defensive midfielder

Team information
- Current team: Incheon United
- Number: 20

Youth career
- 2020–2022: Incheon Daegun High School

College career
Years	Team	Apps	(Gls)
2023–2024	Sun Moon University	24	(1)

Senior career*
Years	Team	Apps	(Gls)
2025–	Incheon United	33	(1)

International career^{‡}
2025–	South Korea U23	2	(0)
Medal record
Men's football
Representing South Korea
Asian Games
Gold medal – first place	2026 Aichi–Nagoya
Korean name
Hangul	박경섭
RR	Bak Gyeongseop
MR	Pak Kyŏngsŏp
- * Club domestic league appearances and goals as of 5 September 2026 ‡ National team caps and goals as of 3 October 2026

Park Gyeong-seop (Korean: 박경섭; born 2 July 2004) is a South Korean professional footballer who plays as a centre-back for Incheon United in the K League 1. Besides centre-back, he can also play as a defensive midfielder.

== Youth and college career ==
Park attended Gwangseong Middle School and Incheon Daegun High School, where he played football in both of these schools. He then attended Sun Moon University, where he helped its football team win the U-League and also won the league's Best Defender award, both in 2024.

== Club career ==
In January 2025, Park was signed by Incheon United and made his debut on 22 February against Gyeongnam. By October, his team cliched the 2025 K League 2 title with three games to go and immediately returned to the top flight.

== International career ==
On 9 July 2026, Park was named to the South Korea U23 squad for the 2026 Asian Games. His squad went on to defeat Japan in the final with a score of 1–0. As a result of the victory, Park received an exemption from mandatory military service.

== Honours ==
Incheon United

- K League 2: 2025

South Korea U23

- Asian Games: 2026
