= Kuai Jiwen =

Chinese footballer (born 2006)

Kuai Jiwen 蒯纪闻
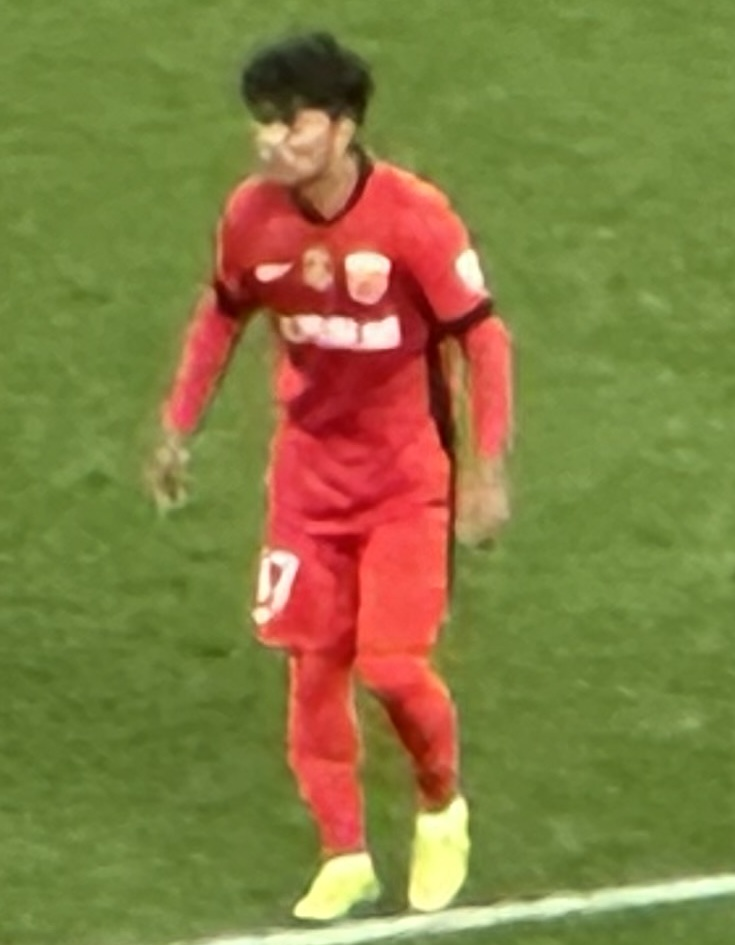
- Kuai Jiwen in May 2025

Personal information
- Full name: Kuai Jiwen
- Date of birth: 28 February 2006 (age 20)
- Place of birth: Binhai County, Yancheng, Jiangsu, China
- Height: 1.74 m (5 ft 9 in)
- Position: Attacking midfielder

Team information
- Current team: Shanghai Port
- Number: 47

Youth career
- 2019–2020: Genbao Football Base
- 2021–2024: Shanghai Port

Senior career*
Years	Team	Apps	(Gls)
2025–	Shanghai Port	29	(1)
2025	→ Shanghai Port B (res.)	1	(1)

International career^{‡}
2023	China U17	3	(1)
2024–2025	China U20	4	(2)
2025–	China U23	5	(1)
2025–	China	3	(0)
Medal record
Men's football
Representing China
EAFF Championship
Bronze medal – third place	2025 South Korea	Team
AFC U-23 Asian Cup
Runner-up	2026 Saudi Arabia	Team
Asian Games
Bronze medal – third place	2026 Aichi–Nagoya	Team
- * Club domestic league appearances and goals as of 19 November 2026 ‡ National team caps and goals as of 18 July 2025

Kuai Jiwen (Chinese: 蒯纪闻; born 28 February 2006) is a Chinese professional footballer who plays as a midfielder for Chinese Super League club Shanghai Port and the China national team.

== Early life ==
Born in Yancheng, Kuai initially pursued football as a hobby while balancing academic studies. In 2019, he failed to qualify for the Shanghai Campus Football Summer Camp, which aimed to select students for national-level competitions. This setback led coach Cheng Yaodong to recommend him to the Genbao Football Base, where he began formal training under Xu Genbao’s guidance.

== Club career ==
Kuai joined Shanghai Port’s youth academy in 2021. His breakthrough came during the 2024 National Youth Three Major Ball Games, where he scored 9 goals in 5 matches, including a semi-final performance of 2 goals and 2 assists against Jilin.

== International career ==
Kuai debuted for the China U17 national team in 2023 and later joined the U20 squad. He participated in the 2025 AFC U20 Asian Cup.

Kuai debuted for China's senior national team on 7 July 2025 in a 0–3 loss against South Korea in the 2025 EAFF E-1 Football Championship. He started the game and played 56 minutes before being replaced by Sai Erjini'ao.

== Career statistics ==
=== Club ===
As of 18 July 2025

Club	Season	League			Cup		Continental		Other		Total	
Club	Season	Division	Apps	Goals	Apps	Goals	Apps	Goals	Apps	Goals	Apps	Goals
Shanghai Port	2025	Chinese Super League	11	1	2	1	0 (Note: Appearances in AFC Champions League Elite)	0	0 (Note: Appearances in Chinese FA Super Cup)	0	13	2
Shanghai Port	Total		11	1	2	1	0	0	0	0	13	2
Career total			11	1	2	1	0	0	0	0	13	2

=== International ===
Appearances and goals by national team and year
National team	Year	Apps	Goals
China	2025	3	0
Total		3	0

== Honours ==
Shanghai Port

- Chinese Super League: 2025

China U23

- AFC U-23 Asian Cup runner-up: 2026
