= Longhua Cultural and Sports Center =

Sports venue in Shenzhen, China

- 龙华文体中心
- Interactive map of Longhua Cultural and Sports Center
- Location: Intersection of Longhua Avenue and Qingxiu Road, Longhua District, Shenzhen, Guangdong, China
- Coordinates: 22.660492°N 114.036068°E
- Owner: Longhua District Government
- Operator: Shenzhen Luhu Culture and Tourism Development Co., Ltd.
- Capacity: 5,360
- Public transit: Shenzhen Metro Line 4 (Qinghu Station, Exit D)

Construction
- Groundbreaking: 2020
- Opened: 2022
- Renovated: 2024–2025
- Architect: South China University of Technology

The Longhua Cultural and Sports Center is a multi-purpose sports complex in Shenzhen's Longhua District, opened in 2022 and renovated in 2024–2025 for the 15th National Games of China. The center is certified as a Green Three-Star Building and a near-zero carbon emissions pilot project by Shenzhen's Ecological Environment Bureau.

== Major events ==
In 2022–2024 it hosted the WCBA All-Star Game, CBA Basketball Invitational, and Chinese Women's Volleyball Super League. In 2025 it will stage volleyball (U18 women's group) and aeromodelling events for the National Games.
