= Liu Chengyu (footballer) =

Chinese footballer (born 2006)

Liu Chengyu 刘诚宇
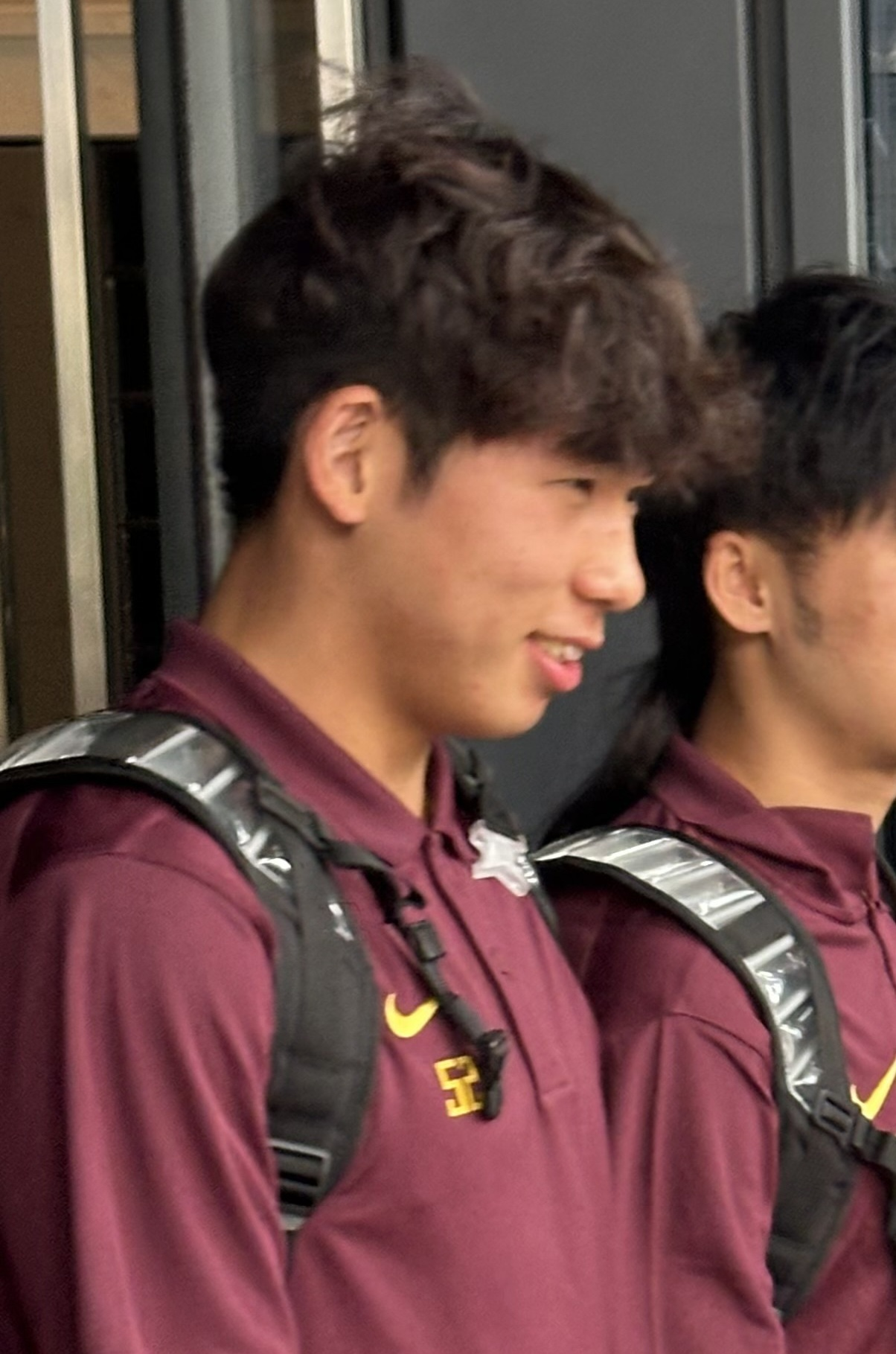
- Liu Chengyu in June 2025

Personal information
- Full name: Liu Chengyu
- Date of birth: 2 July 2006 (age 20)
- Place of birth: Xiangshui County, Jiangsu, China
- Height: 1.84 m (6 ft 0 in)
- Position: Striker

Team information
- Current team: Shanghai Shenhua
- Number: 18

Youth career
- 2021–2024: Shanghai Shenhua

Senior career*
| Years | Team | Apps | (Gls) |
| 2024– | Shanghai Shenhua | 30 | (6) |

International career^{‡}
| 2022–2023 | China U17 | 5 | (0) |
| 2024–2025 | China U20 | 8 | (4) |
| 2025– | China | 4 | (0) |
Medal record
Representing China
Men's football
EAFF Championship
| Bronze medal – third place | 2025 South Korea | Team |
- * Club domestic league appearances and goals as of 19 November 2026 ‡ National team caps and goals as of 18 July 2025

Liu Chengyu (Chinese: 刘诚宇; born 2 July 2006) is a Chinese professional footballer who plays as a striker for Chinese Super League club Shanghai Shenhua and the China national team.

== Early life ==
Liu was born in Yancheng, Jiangsu Province and moved to Shanghai with his family to pursue football training. He joined Shanghai Shenhua's youth academy in 2021 and progressed through the ranks, making an impact in the U21 league. During the 2024 season, he scored 10 goals in 16 appearances for Shanghai Shenhua U21, which led to his promotion to the senior team in February 2024.

== Club career ==
Liu made his professional debut for Shanghai Shenhua in the 2024-25 AFC Champions League Elite, coming on as a substitute against Central Coast Mariners in November 2024. While he saw limited playing time with the senior team, he continued to playing in youth competitions. In the 2024 U21 league playoffs, he scored twice in a single match, contributing to his team's success.

== International career ==
Liu gained attention during the 2025 U20 Asian Cup, where he scored goals against Qatar and Kyrgyzstan. In June 2024, he scored two goals against South Korea U19 in the Silk Road-Huashan Cup, helping China U19 secure a victory.

== Career statistics ==
=== Club ===
As of 18 July 2025

| Club | Season | League | | | Cup | | Continental | | Other | | Total | |
| Club | Season | Division | Apps | Goals | Apps | Goals | Apps | Goals | Apps | Goals | Apps | Goals |
|---|---|---|---|---|---|---|---|---|---|---|---|---|
| Shanghai Shenhua | 2024 | Chinese Super League | 0 | 0 | 0 | 0 | 1 (Note: Appearances in AFC Champions League Elite) | 0 | 0 (Note: Appearances in Chinese FA Super Cup) | 0 | 1 | 0 |
| Shanghai Shenhua | 2025 | Chinese Super League | 7 | 3 | 2 | 0 | 2 | 0 | 0 | 0 | 11 | 3 |
| Shanghai Shenhua | Total | | 7 | 3 | 2 | 0 | 3 | 0 | 0 | 0 | 12 | 3 |
| Career total | | | 7 | 3 | 2 | 0 | 3 | 0 | 0 | 0 | 12 | 3 |

== Honours ==
Shanghai Shenhua

- Chinese FA Super Cup: 2025
