= Imran Memet =

Chinese footballer

Personal information
- Full name: Imran Memet
- Date of birth: 3 May 2005 (age 21)
- Place of birth: Ürümqi, Xinjiang, China
- Height: 1.88 m (6 ft 2 in)
- Position: Defensive midfielder

Team information
- Current team: Shandong Taishan
- Number: 38

Youth career
- Shandong Luneng Taishan Football School

Senior career*
Years	Team	Apps	(Gls)
2024–	Shandong Taishan B	24	(0)
2025–	Shandong Taishan	18	(1)

International career^{‡}
2024–2025	China U20	8	(0)
2025–	China U23	4	(0)
Medal record
Men's football
Representing China
AFC U-23 Asian Cup
Runner-up	2026 Saudi Arabia	Team
Asian Games
Bronze medal – third place	2026 Aichi–Nagoya	Team
- * Club domestic league appearances and goals as of 19 November 2026 ‡ National team caps and goals as of 30 April 2024

Imran Memet (Chinese: 依木兰·买买提; born May 3, 2005) is a Chinese professional footballer who plays as a defensive midfielder for Shandong Taishan in Chinese Super League, the top tier of Chinese football. He is also a member of the China U20 national team.

== Early life ==
Imran Memet was born on May 3, 2005, in China. He began his football career at the youth academy of Shandong Taishan, one of the most successful football clubs in China. His talent was recognized early, and he was promoted to Shandong Taishan B in China League Two, the reserve team, in February 2024, where he signed a contract until March 31, 2026.

== Club and International Career ==
Imran Memet joined Shandong Taishan B on February 1, 2024, signing a contract that runs until March 31, 2026. He primarily plays as a defensive midfielder but is also capable of operating in central midfield. In his debut season, he made 11 appearances for the team, showcasing his defensive skills and ability to control the midfield.

Imran Memet has represented China at the youth level, being part of the China U20 national team. He has participated in several international tournaments, including the AFC U-20 Asian Cup.
