= Park Seung-soo =

South Korean footballer (born 2007)

Personal information
- Date of birth: 17 March 2007 (age 19)
- Place of birth: Seoul, South Korea
- Height: 1.84 m (6 ft 0 in)
- Position: Winger

Team information
- Current team: Newcastle United U21
- Number: 47

Youth career
- 2016–2023: Suwon Samsung Bluewings
- 2025–: Newcastle United

Senior career*
Years	Team	Apps	(Gls)
2023–2025	Suwon Samsung Bluewings	25	(1)

International career^{‡}
2023	South Korea U17	5	(0)
2025	South Korea U20	5	(1)
2026–	South Korea U23	3	(0)
Medal record
Men's football
Representing South Korea
Asian Games
Gold medal – first place	2026 Aichi–Nagoya
AFC U-17 Asian Cup
Runner-up	2023 Thailand
- * Club domestic league appearances and goals as of 12 July 2025 ‡ National team caps and goals as of 3 October 2026

Park Seung-soo (Korean: 박승수; born 17 March 2007) is a South Korean footballer who plays as a winger for Newcastle United U21.

== Club career ==
Park joined the youth academy of South Korean side Suwon Samsung Bluewings and was promoted to the club's senior team ahead of the 2024 season. While playing for Suwon at the K League 2, he scored his first professional goal in a 1–1 home draw with Ansan Greeners on 30 June 2024 and became the youngest player to score in South Korean professional football.

Following his stint at Suwon, on 24 July 2025, he signed for the academy of Premier League club Newcastle United. He made a total of three unofficial appearances at the senior team against K League All-Stars, Tottenham Hotspur and Espanyol during the pre-season. On 16 August, he was officially included in the senior squad for the first time in their Premier League opener against Aston Villa.

== International career ==
Park played for the South Korea national under-17 team and the under-20 team at the 2023 AFC U-17 Asian Cup and the 2025 AFC U-20 Asian Cup, respectively.

Park was called up to South Korea under-23s for the 2026 Asian Games by manager Lee Min-sung. He played three matches as a substitute, while South Korea won the tournament. He qualified for special exemption from compulsory military service as an Asian Games gold medalist according to South Korean law. After the medal ceremony, however, he wore a celebratory cap for an ex-service man and saluted spectators. He also uploaded a selfie on Instagram with he wearing the celebratory cap in the locker room. His imitation of discharge ceremony caused controversy in South Korea. He later apologized to fans for his action.

== Style of play ==
Park is a right-footed player and plays as a left winger. He was noted for his pace and dribbling skills in his peer group.

== Career statistics ==
=== Club ===
As of 18 August 2026

Appearances and goals by club, season and competition
Club	Season	League			National cup		Other		Total	
Club	Season	Division	Apps	Goals	Apps	Goals	Apps	Goals	Apps	Goals
Suwon Samsung Bluewings	2024	K League 2	14	1	1	0	—		15	1
Suwon Samsung Bluewings	2025	K League 2	11	0	2	0	—		13	0
Suwon Samsung Bluewings	Total		25	1	3	0	—		28	1
Newcastle United U21	2025–26	—			—		6 (Note: Three appearances in EFL Trophy, three appearances in National League Cup)	0	6	0
Newcastle United U21	2026–27	—			—		1 (Note: Appearance in National League Cup)	0	1	0
Newcastle United U21	Total		—		—		7	0	7	0
Career total			25	1	3	0	7	0	35	1

== Honours ==
South Korea U17

- AFC U-17 Asian Cup runner-up: 2023

South Korea U23

- Asian Games: 2026
