= Asilbek Jumaev =

Uzbek footballer

Personal information
- Date of birth: 25 March 2005 (age 21)
- Place of birth: Uzbekistan
- Height: 1.72 m (5 ft 8 in)
- Positions: Attacking midfielder; winger

Team information
- Current team: Neftchi Fergana
- Number: 11

Senior career*
Years	Team	Apps	(Gls)
2022—2025	Surkhon	104	(5)
2026—	Neftchi	21	(2)

International career^{‡}
2024—	Uzbekistan U23		
- * Club domestic league appearances and goals as of 25 September 2026 ‡ National team caps and goals as of 25 September 2026

Asilbek Jumaev (Uzbek: Асилбек Жумаев; born 25 March 2005) is an Uzbek professional footballer who plays as an attacking midfielder or winger for Uzbekistan Super League club Neftchi and the Uzbekistan national under-23 team.

== Club career ==
=== Surkhon ===
Jumaev began his senior professional career with Surkhon in the 2022 Uzbekistan Super League season. Established himself as a prominent playmaker, capable of playing centrally as an attacking midfielder or wide on either wing. Across four seasons with Surkhon between 2022 and 2025, he logged over 100 competitive appearances in domestic league and cup fixtures.

=== Neftchi ===
On 1 January 2026, Jumaev completed a transfer to fellow Super League side Neftchi, signing a contract through December 2027. He became an integral starter in Neftchi's midfield during their 2026 Uzbekistan Super League campaign and featured in their continental campaign in the AFC Champions League.

== International career ==
Jumaev has represented Uzbekistan across youth national teams, earning selection for the Uzbekistan national under-23 team. He featured during the 2026 AFC U-23 Asian Cup group stages and knockout matches.

In September 2026, Jumaev was called up to represent Uzbekistan Olympic squad at the 2026 Asian Games. He featured in Group C fixtures, including Uzbekistan's 5-1 victory over the Philippines Olympic team on 15 September 2026 and a 2-0 win against Kuwait Olympic on 18 September 2026.
