= Rion Ichihara =

Japanese footballer (born 2005)

Rion Ichihara 市原 吏音
Personal information
- Date of birth: 7 July 2005 (age 21)
- Place of birth: Saitama, Japan
- Height: 1.87 m (6 ft 2 in)
- Position: Defender

Team information
- Current team: AZ
- Number: 31

Youth career
- Omiya Ryusei SSS
- –2023: RB Omiya Ardija

Senior career*
| Years | Team | Apps | (Gls) |
| 2023–2025 | RB Omiya Ardija | 77 | (5) |
| 2026– | AZ | 3 | (0) |
| 2026– | Jong AZ | 10 | (0) |

International career^{‡}
| 2023 | Japan U18 | 2 | (0) |
| 2023–2024 | Japan U19 | 4 | (0) |
| 2024–2025 | Japan U20 | 16 | (3) |
| 2025 | Japan U22 | 1 | (0) |
| 2025– | Japan U23 | 9 | (0) |
Medal record
Men's football
Representing Japan
Asian Games
| Silver medal – second place | 2026 Aichi–Nagoya |
- * Club domestic league appearances and goals as of 15 September 2026 ‡ National team caps and goals as of 3 October 2026

Rion Ichihara (市原 吏音, Ichihara Rion; born 7 July 2005) is a Japanese professional footballer who plays as a defender for Eredivisie club AZ.

== Early life ==
Ichihara was born in Saitama, Japan.

== Club career ==
As a youth player, Ichihara joined the youth academy of Japanese side RB Omiya Ardija and was promoted to the club's senior team in 2023, where he made seventy-eight league appearances and scored five goals and helped them achieve promotion from the third tier to the second tier. Following his stint there, he signed for Dutch side AZ Alkmaar in 2026.

== International career ==
Ichihara is a Japan youth international. During January 2026, he played for the Japan national under-23 football team at the 2026 AFC U-23 Asian Cup.

== Style of play ==
Ichihara plays as a defender. Japanese magazine Soccer Hihyo wrote in 2026 that he "is a center back who combines height of 187cm with strength and skill with his feet, and leads the defensive line with exceptional leadership".

== Career statistics ==
As of match played 22 October 2026

Appearances and goals by club, season and competition
| Club | Season | League | | | Cup | | Continental | | Other | | Total | |
| Club | Season | Division | Apps | Goals | Apps | Goals | Apps | Goals | Apps | Goals | Apps | Goals |
|---|---|---|---|---|---|---|---|---|---|---|---|---|
| RB Omiya Ardija | 2023 | J2 League | 17 | 0 | 1 | 0 | — | | — | | 18 | 0 |
| RB Omiya Ardija | 2024 | J3 League | 31 | 4 | 1 | 0 | — | | — | | 32 | 4 |
| RB Omiya Ardija | 2025 | J2 League | 29 | 1 | 0 | 0 | — | | 1 (Note: Appearance in promotion play-offs) | 0 | 30 | 1 |
| RB Omiya Ardija | Total | | 77 | 5 | 2 | 0 | — | | 1 | 0 | 80 | 5 |
| AZ | 2025–26 | Eredivisie | 2 | 0 | 0 | 0 | 1 (Note: Appearance in UEFA Conference League) | 0 | — | | 3 | 0 |
| AZ | 2026–27 | Eredivisie | 1 | 0 | 0 | 0 | 1 (Note: Appearances in UEFA Europa League) | 0 | — | | 2 | 0 |
| AZ | Total | | 3 | 0 | 0 | 0 | 2 | 0 | — | | 5 | 0 |
| Jong AZ | 2025–26 | Eerste Divisie | 6 | 0 | — | | — | | — | | 6 | 0 |
| Jong AZ | 2026–27 | Eerste Divisie | 4 | 0 | — | | — | | — | | 4 | 0 |
| Jong AZ | Total | | 10 | 0 | — | | — | | — | | 10 | 0 |
| Career total | | | 90 | 5 | 2 | 0 | 2 | 0 | 1 | 0 | 95 | 5 |

== Honours ==
RB Omiya Ardija

- J3 League: 2024

AZ

- KNVB Cup: 2025–26
- Johan Cruyff Shield: 2026

Individual

- J2 League Best XI: 2025
- J3 League Best XI: 2024
