= Thailand national under-23 football team =

Thailand U23
- Nickname(s): ช้างศึก (War elephants)
- Association: FA Thailand
- Confederation: AFC (Asia)
- Sub-confederation: AFF (Southeast Asia)
- Head coach: Tiago Moutinho
- Captain: Chanapach Buaphan
- Home stadium: Rajamangala Stadium
- FIFA code: THA
First colours	Second colours	Third colours

First international
- Bangladesh 2–3 Thailand (Seoul, South Korea; 18 May 1991)

Biggest win
- Thailand 9–0 Timor-Leste (Vientiane, Laos; 8 November 2009)

Biggest defeat
- Thailand 0–6 Japan (Bangkok, Thailand; 13 November 1999)

AFC U-23 Asian Cup
- Appearances: 6 (first in 2016)
- Best result: Quarter-finals (2020)

Asian Games
- Appearances: 5 (first in 2002)
- Best result: Fourth place (2002, 2014)

Southeast Asian Games
- Appearances: 12 (first in 2001)
- Best result: Gold medal (7 titles)

AFF U-23 Championship
- Appearances: 4 (first in 2005)
- Best result: (gold) Champions (2005)
Medal record
U-23 Southeast Asian Games
Gold medal – first place	2001 Malaysia	Team
Gold medal – first place	2003 Vietnam	Team
Gold medal – first place	2005 Philippines	Team
Gold medal – first place	2007 Thailand	Team
Gold medal – first place	2013 Myanmar	Team
Gold medal – first place	2015 Singapore	Team
Gold medal – first place	2017 Malaysia	Team
Silver medal – second place	2021 Hanoi	Team
Silver medal – second place	2023 Phnom Penh	Team
AFF U-23 Championship
Gold medal – first place	2005 Thailand	Team
Silver medal – second place	2019 Cambodia	Team
Silver medal – second place	2022 Cambodia	Team
Bronze medal – third place	2023 Thailand	Team

The Thailand national under-23 football team (Thai: ฟุตบอลทีมชาติไทยรุ่นอายุไม่เกิน 23 ปี, RTGS: futbon thim chat thai run ayu mai koen yi-sip-sam pi), also known as the Thailand Olympic football team, is the national team for the under-23 and 22 level, representing Thailand in international football competitions in the Olympic Games, Asian Games and Southeast Asian Games, as well as any other under-23 international football tournaments including the AFC U-23 Championship. It is controlled by the Football Association of Thailand.

The team has won the Southeast Asian Games gold medal for a record seven times, making it the most successful among ASEAN football teams. Despite its major domination in Southeast Asia, the team never won any gold medal in Asian level.

== History ==
=== 2013–present ===
==== 2014 Asian Games ====
The 2014 Asian Games was held in Incheon, South Korea. The Thailand U23 Team under coach Kiatisuk Senamuang built a young-blood team that would later become the main Thailand senior team with players such as Chanathip Songkrasin, Sarach Yooyen, Kawin Thamsatchanan, Charyl Chappuis, etc. In this competition the team made top performance by finishing in fourth place, the highest in the Asian Games after 1998.

==== 2016 AFC U-23 Championship ====
The 2016 AFC U-23 Championship final tournament was held in Qatar from 12–30 January 2016. Thailand qualified for the tournament by runner-up in the qualification stage in homeland in March 2015. The Young Elephants recorded comprehensive victories; 2–1 against Cambodia; 5–1 against Philippines and 0–0 against North Korea.

The 2016 AFC U-23 Championship doubled as the qualifying tournament for the 2016 Summer Olympics Football tournament in Rio de Janeiro. Thailand were eliminated from the championship in the group stage. A 1–1 draw to Saudi Arabia followed by a 0–4 loss to Japan meant that Thailand needed to defeat North Korea in the final group match. A nil-all draw resulted in the elimination for Thailand from the tournament and hence failure to qualify for the Olympics. Although eliminated, Thailand earned praise and reputation for its strong performance in the tournament.

==== 2018 AFC U-23 Championship ====
In the 2018 AFC U-23 Championship, Thailand only finished second in their qualification, but with the team being undefeated, Thailand beat Malaysia 3–0 and was held draws by Mongolia and Indonesia, Thailand became the best runners-up to qualify. The Young Elephants prepared by hosting the friendly 2017 M-150 Cup, where they finished fourth but managed to beat Japan 2–1. This enthusiastic performance of Thailand put up great hope for the team, having earlier conquered the 2017 SEA Games.

However, having entered the tournament, it would become Thailand's complete nightmare. They opened their game with a 0–1 loss to North Korea before got slapped with the same result to Japan, eventually eliminated the Young Elephants from the competition. The Thais bid goodbye from the competition in a humiliating fashion, with a devastating 1–5 loss to Palestine. To add the dismay, their defeated rivals Malaysia and Vietnam both moved on to progress from the group stage, with the latter managed to reach the final and ended in second place.

==== 2020 AFC U-23 Championship ====
Thailand was awarded as host of the 2020 AFC U-23 Championship, therefore they were automatically qualified. Thailand still participated in the qualification as an opportunity to train and improve the team. Thailand, once again, finished second, after beating Indonesia and Brunei, but lost to Vietnam. Before the tournament, Thailand was eliminated at the 2019 Southeast Asian Games after the group stage.

In the group stage, Thailand would face Iraq, Australia and maiden debutant Bahrain, and was tipped favorably to progress, mainly due to Australia's underperformance in the tournament and inexperienced Bahrain. Thailand prepared by playing against Saudi Arabia in the friendly encounter, but lost 0–1. In their first match against inexperienced Bahrain, the Thais proved to be too dominant for the visitor, as the Thais demolished Bahrain 5–0. This win allowed more Thai supporters coming to cheer for the Thai side in their second encounter against underperformed Australia, instead, Thailand suffered a heartbreaking 1–2 loss to Australia despite having taken the lead and putting Thailand's quest to the final stage in their final game against Iraq. In final matches in group state Thailand draw Iraq 1–1 earn a spot in the quarterfinals of the tournament for the first time in AFC U-23 Championship as the second-placed team in the group behind Australia. In quarterfinals Thailand have to face with the winner of Group B, Saudi Arabia and lost with penalty 1-0 end the way to 2020 Olympic Games in Tokyo.

==== 2022 AFC U-23 Asian Cup ====
The 2022 AFC U-23 Asian Cup final tournament was held in Uzbekistan from 1 to 19 June 2022. Thailand qualified for the tournament by being runner-up in the qualification stage in Mongolia in October 2021, which drew; 1–1 against Mongolia; 3-0 against Laos and 0–0 against Malaysia.

In the group stage, Thailand (Pot 2) was drawn into Group C with South Korea (Pot 1), Vietnam (Pot 3), and Malaysia (Pot 4). All matches were played at Tashkent. In the 2022 AFC U-23 Asian Cup at Tashkent, Thailand drew 2–2 against Vietnam, won 3–0 against Malaysia, and lost to South Korea 0–1; they were eliminated from the group stage with four points.

== Results and fixtures ==
Win Draw Loss

=== 2026 ===
8 January AFC U-23 Asian Cup GS	Australia	2–1	Thailand	Saudi Arabia
	Alagich 29' (pen.); Macallister 30'	Report	Sittha 8'	Stadium: Al-Shabab Club Stadium, Riyadh; Attendance: 90; Referee: Kim Yu-jeong (South Korea)

11 January AFC U-23 Asian Cup GS	Thailand	1–1	Iraq	Saudi Arabia
	Chinngoen 85'	Report	Faisal 27' (pen.)	Stadium: Prince Faisal bin Fahd Sports City Stadium, Riyadh; Referee: Yahya Al-Mulla (United Arab Emirates)

14 January AFC U-23 Asian Cup GS	Thailand	0–0	China	Saudi Arabia
		Report		Stadium: Al-Shabab Club Stadium, Riyadh; Attendance: 484; Referee: Abdulla Al-Marri (Qatar)

25 March Xi'an Tournament	China	2–2	Thailand	Xi'an, China
19:35 UTC+8	Xiang Yuwang 50'; Li Xinxiang 67'		Jehhanafee 22'; Chawanwit 35'	Stadium: Xi'an International Football Center; Attendance: 17,318

28 March Xi'an Tournament	Thailand	1–0	Vietnam	Xi'an, China
15:00 UTC+8	Thanakrit 1'	Report		Stadium: Fengdong Football Park East Stadium; Referee: Ma Ning (China)

31 March Xi'an Tournament	North Korea	3–1	Thailand	Xi'an, China
15:00 UTC+8	An Kyong-ung 19'; Ri Il-song 28' (pen.); Choe Kuk 86'		Jehhanafee 52'	Stadium: Fengdong Football Park East Stadium

3 June Friendly	Thailand	1–1	Kyrgyzstan	Pathum Thani, Thailand
18:00 UTC+7	Yotsakorn 82'		Omarov 45'	Stadium: Yamaoka Hanasaka Football Academy

6 June Friendly	Thailand	2–3	South Korea	Pathum Thani, Thailand
	Chonnapat 3'; Theekawin 16'		Kang Seong-jin 10'; Lee Young-jun 49'; Choi Woo-jin 79'	Stadium: True BG Stadium

9 June Friendly	Thailand	2–5	United Arab Emirates	Pathum Thani, Thailand
	Thanakrit 2'; Jehhanafee 85'

16 September Asian Games GS	Thailand	3–2	Kyrgyzstan	Toyota, Japan
16:00 UTC+9	Jehhanafee 55'; Paripan 69', 73'		Iskandarbekov 22'; Balbakov 47'	Stadium: Toyota Stadium; Attendance: 2,563; Referee: Abdulhadi Al-Ruaile (Qatar)

20 September Asian Games GS	Hong Kong	1–5	Thailand	Toyota, Japan
16:00 UTC+9	Wu Chun Ming 14'	Report	Thanakrit 39'; Paripan 54'; Tsang Yi Hang 56' (o.g.); Jehhanafee 76'; Worawut 84'	Stadium: Toyota Stadium; Attendance: 10,439; Referee: Hanna Hattab (Syria)

23 September Asian Games GS	Japan	3–0	Thailand	Toyota, Japan
19:30 UTC+8	Y. Nakajima 31'; Kosugi 47'; Ishii 48'	Report		Stadium: Toyota Stadium; Attendance: 18,408; Referee: Kim Woo-sung (South Korea)

26 September Asian Games QF	China	3–0	Thailand	Toyota, Japan
15:00	Sangtong 45+1' (o.g.); Hu Hetao 47'; Zhang Yuning 63'	Report		Stadium: Toyota Stadium; Attendance: 7,587; Referee: Hiroki Kasahara (Japan)

10 November Gia Lai U-23 VTV Cup	Vietnam	3–0	Thailand	Gia Lai, Vietnam
19:00 UTC+7	Nguyễn Minh Tâm 17', 45'; Williams Minh Hoàng 88' (pen.)	Report		Stadium: Pleiku Stadium; Referee: Razlan Joffri Ali (Malaysia)

12 November Gia Lai U-23 VTV Cup	Thailand	1–2	Qatar	Gia Lai, Vietnam
15:00 UTC+7	Phongsakon 90+3' (pen.)	Report	Jarrar 8'; Saleh 18'	Stadium: Pleiku Stadium; Referee: Đỗ Khánh Nam (Vietnam)

14 November Gia Lai U-23 VTV Cup	Thailand	3–1	Singapore	Gia Lai, Vietnam
15:00 UTC+7	Chaiyasit 33'; Phongsakon 64'; Paripan 79'	Report	Syafiz 41'	Stadium: Pleiku Stadium; Referee: Đỗ Khánh Nam (Vietnam)

== Coaching staff ==
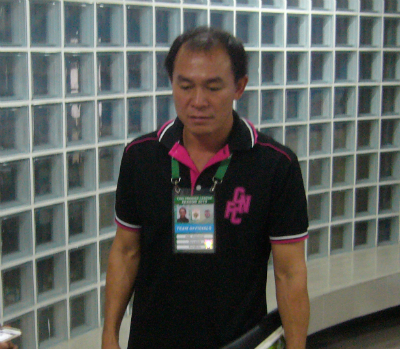
Thawatchai Damrong-Ongtrakul, the current head coach of under 23 Thailand.

Position	Name
Team manager	(Thailand) Chalermchai Mahagitsiri
Head coach	Thawatchai Damrong-Ongtrakul
Assistant coach	Tanapat Na Tarue
Assistant coach	Choketawee Promrut
Assistant coach	Puriphat Niyomjit
Goalkeeping coach	Pansa Meesatham
Fitness coach	Pongpipat Promchan
Match analyst	Naruebet Saengsawang
Match analyst	Saranpat Boeploy
Kit manager	Chusak Phakdeedamrongrat
Doctor	Phakphon Issarakraisil
Physiotherapists	Suwicha Noradee
Team coordinator	Chonlachart Siripanich

== Coaching history ==
- (Czech Republic) Doldjs Otkar (2001)
- (England) Peter Withe (2002)
- (Brazil) Carlos Roberto (2003–2004)
- (Thailand) Chatchai Paholpat (2004)
- (Germany) Sigfried Held (2004)
- (Thailand) Charnwit Polcheewin (2005–2006)
- (Thailand) Prapol Pongpanich (2007)
- (Thailand) Thongsuk Sampahungsith (2007)
- (England) Steve Darby (2009)
- (England) Bryan Robson (2010)
- (Thailand) Charnwit Polcheewin (2011)
- (Thailand) Prapol Pongpanich (2011)
- (Brazil) Alexandré Pölking (2012)
- (Thailand) Kiatisuk Senamuang (2013–2015)
- (Thailand) Choketawee Promrut (2015)
- (Thailand) Kiatisuk Senamuang (2016)
- (Thailand) Worrawoot Srimaka (2016–2017)
- (Bulgaria) Zoran Janković (2017–2018)
- (Thailand) Worrawoot Srimaka (2018)
- (Brazil) Alexandre Gama (2018–2019)
- (Japan) Akira Nishino (2019–2021)
- (Thailand) Worrawoot Srimaka (2021–2022)
- (Spain) Salvador Valero Garcia (interim) (2022)
- (Brazil) Alexandré Pölking (interim) (2022)
- (Thailand) Issara Sritaro (2022–2024)
- (Japan) Takayuki Nishigaya (2024–2025)
- (Thailand) Thawatchai Damrong-Ongtrakul (2025–)

== Players ==
=== Current squad ===
The following 23 players were called up for the 2026 Asian Games on 15 September - 3 October 2026.

No.	Pos.	Player	Date of birth (age)	Caps	Goals	Club
1	GK	Sorawat Phosaman	30 January 2003 (age 23)			(Football Association of Thailand) Pattani
20	GK	Sirassawut Wongruankhum	27 October 2005 (age 21)			(Football Association of Thailand) Chiangrai United
23	GK	Chommaphat Boonloet	17 February 2003 (age 23)			(Football Association of Thailand) Uthai Thani
2	DF	Chanon Tamma	19 March 2004 (age 22)			(Football Association of Thailand) BG Pathum United
3	DF	Oussama Thiangkham	4 November 2003 (age 23)			(Football Association of Thailand) PT Prachuap
4	DF	Chanapach Buaphan (captain)	22 March 2004 (age 22)			(Football Association of Thailand) BG Pathum United
5	DF	Theekawin Chansri	17 February 2004 (age 22)			(Football Association of Thailand) Muangthong United
12	DF	Auttapon Sangtong	29 April 2004 (age 22)			(Football Association of Thailand) Nakhon Pathom United
13	DF	Nathan James	28 September 2004 (age 22)			(Football Association of Thailand) Mahasarakham
16	DF	Pichitchai Sienkrathok	18 May 2003 (age 23)			(Football Association of Thailand) Ayutthaya United
21	DF	Phon-Ek Jensen	30 March 2003 (age 23)			(Football Association of Thailand) PT Prachuap
22	DF	Wichan Inaram	20 July 2007 (age 19)			(Football Association of Thailand) Bangkok United
6	MF	Sittha Boonlha	2 September 2004 (age 22)			(Football Association of Thailand) Port
8	MF	Chawanwit Saelao	12 October 2004 (age 22)			(Football Association of Thailand) Prime Bangkok
10	MF	Thanakrit Chotmuangpak	6 January 2006 (age 20)			(Football Association of Thailand) Buriram United
11	MF	Siraphop Wandee	22 January 2004 (age 22)			(Football Association of Thailand) Nara
15	MF	Kittapak Seangsawat	8 April 2005 (age 21)			(Football Association of Thailand) BG Pathum United
18	MF	Patipanchai Phothep	21 July 2003 (age 23)			(Football Association of Thailand) Rayong
19	MF	Paripan Wongsa	19 March 2005 (age 21)			(Football Association of Thailand) Rasisalai United
7	FW	Thanawut Phochai	2 December 2005 (age 20)			(Japan Football Association) SC Sagamihara
9	FW	Yotsakorn Burapha	8 June 2005 (age 21)			(Football Association of Thailand) Chonburi
14	FW	Jehhanafee Mamah	24 October 2005 (age 21)			(Football Association of Thailand) PT Prachuap
17	FW	Worawut Noisri	16 February 2005 (age 21)			(Football Association of Thailand) Chiangmai United

=== Recent call-ups ===
The following players have been called up within the last 12 months.

Pos.	Player	Date of birth (age)	Caps	Goals	Club	Latest call-up
GK	Kritsana Pummarrin	9 February 2005 (age 21)			(Germany) FC Gießen	v. United Arab Emirates, 9 June 2026
GK	Siraset Aekprathumchai	8 April 2003 (age 23)			(Thailand) Chainat Hornbill	2026 AFC U-23 Asian Cup
GK	Narongsak Naengwongsa	19 February 2004 (age 22)			(Thailand) Ayutthaya United	2026 AFC U-23 Asian Cup
GK	Kasidej Rungkitwattananukul	23 April 2004 (age 22)			(Thailand) Bangkok	2026 AFC U-23 Asian Cup qualification
GK	Supanut Sudathip	22 June 2006 (age 20)			(Thailand) Bangkok United	2026 AFC U-23 Asian Cup qualification^{PRE}
DF	Sphon Noiwong	7 September 2005 (age 21)			(Thailand) Police Tero	v. United Arab Emirates, 9 June 2026
DF	Parinya Noosong	7 April 2005 (age 21)			(Thailand) Phitsanulok	2026 AFC U-23 Asian Cup
DF	Pattarapon Suksakit	19 August 2003 (age 23)			(Thailand) Chiangrai United	2026 AFC U-23 Asian Cup
DF	Pakawat Taengoakson	28 February 2005 (age 21)			(Thailand) Samui United	2026 AFC U-23 Asian Cup
DF	Waris Choolthong	8 January 2004 (age 22)			(Thailand) BG Pathum United	2025 SEA Games
DF	Thawatchai Inprakhon	March 31, 2003 (age 23)			(Thailand) Chiangrai United	2025 SEA Games
MF	Kakana Khamyok	21 May 2004 (age 22)			(Thailand) Bangkok United	v. United Arab Emirates, 9 June 2026
MF	Teerapat Pruetong	17 February 2007 (age 19)			(Japan) Hokkaido Consadole Sapporo	v. United Arab Emirates, 9 June 2026
MF	Kasidit Kalasin	2 July 2004 (age 22)			(Thailand) Nakhon Pathom United	v. United Arab Emirates, 9 June 2026
MF	Kittapak Seangsawat	8 April 2005 (age 21)			(Thailand) Muangthong United	v. United Arab Emirates, 9 June 2026
MF	Nobparut Raksachum	2 March 2004 (age 22)			(Thailand) Songkhla	v. United Arab Emirates, 9 June 2026
MF	Jittiphat Wasungnoen	7 June 2005 (age 21)			(Thailand) PT Prachuap	2026 AFC U-23 Asian Cup
MF	Yotsakorn Natthasit	29 May 2004 (age 22)			(Thailand) Pattaya United	2026 AFC U-23 Asian Cup
MF	Peeranan Buakai	17 June 2005 (age 21)			(Thailand) Nongbua Pitchaya	2026 AFC U-23 Asian Cup
MF	Seksan Ratree	14 March 2003 (age 23)			(Thailand) Port	2025 SEA Games
MF	Chaiyaphon Otton	4 April 2003 (age 23)			(Thailand) Port	2025 SEA Games
FW	Chinngoen Phutonyong	15 August 2003 (age 23)			(Thailand) Chiangrai United	2026 AFC U-23 Asian Cup
FW	Iklas Sanron	16 December 2004 (age 21)			(Thailand) Buriram United	2026 AFC U-23 Asian Cup
^{INJ} Withdrew from the squad due to injury^{PRE} Included in the Preliminary squad or on standby^{RET} Retired from the national team^{SUS} Serving suspension from the national team^{WD} Withdrew from the squad due to non-injury issue

=== Previous squads ===
AFC U-23 Asian Cup

- 2016 AFC U-23 Championship squad
- 2018 AFC U-23 Championship squad
- 2020 AFC U-23 Championship squad
- 2022 AFC U-23 Asian Cup squad
- 2024 AFC U-23 Asian Cup squad
- 2026 AFC U-23 Asian Cup squad

Asian Games

- 2002 Asian Games squad
- 2006 Asian Games squad
- 2010 Asian Games squad
- 2014 Asian Games squad
- 2018 Asian Games squad
- 2022 Asian Games squad

SEA Games

- 2005 Southeast Asian Games squad
- 2007 Southeast Asian Games squad
- 2009 Southeast Asian Games squad
- 2011 Southeast Asian Games squad
- 2013 Southeast Asian Games squad
- 2015 Southeast Asian Games squad
- 2017 Southeast Asian Games squad
- 2019 Southeast Asian Games squad
- 2021 Southeast Asian Games squad
- 2023 Southeast Asian Games squad
- 2025 Southeast Asian Games squad

== Competitive record ==
=== Olympic Games ===
Olympic Games finals										Qualifications					
Year	Host country	Result	Position	GP	W	D*	L	GS	GA	GP	W	D	L	GS	GA
1992	Spain	Did not qualify								8	5	0	3	25	9
1996	United States	Did not qualify								4	2	0	2	12	6
2000	Australia	Did not qualify								6	1	2	3	4	13
2004	Greece	Did not qualify								2	0	1	1	2	5
2008	China	Did not qualify								8	3	2	3	9	7
2012	Great Britain	Did not qualify								2	0	0	2	0	4
2016	Brazil	Did not qualify								2016 AFC U-23 Championship					
2020	Japan	Did not qualify								2020 AFC U-23 Championship					
2024	France	Did not qualify								2024 AFC U-23 Asian Cup					
2028	United States	To be determined								2028 AFC U-23 Asian Cup					
2032	Australia	To be determined													
Total		0/7	—							30	11	5	14	52	44

=== AFC U-23 Asian Cup ===
AFC U-23 Asian Cup finals										Qualifications						
Year	Host country	Result	Position	GP	W	D*	L	GS	GA	GP	W	D	L	GS	GA	Manager(s)
2013^{1}	Oman	Did not qualify								5	2	1	2	11	6	Pölking
2016	Qatar	Group stage	13th	3	0	2	1	3	7	3	2	1	0	7	2	Kiatisuk
2018	China	Group stage	16th	3	0	0	3	1	7	3	1	2	0	4	1	Worrawoot, Janković
2020	Thailand	Quarter-finals	6th	4	1	1	2	7	4	3	2	0	1	12	4	Gama, Nishino
2022	Uzbekistan	Group stage	9th	3	1	1	1	5	3	3	1	2	0	4	1	Worrawoot
2024	Qatar	Group stage	13th	3	1	0	2	2	6	3	3	0	0	9	0	Issara
2026	Saudi Arabia	Group stage	13th	3	0	2	1	2	3	3	2	1	0	10	3	Thawatchai
2028	Japan	To be determined								To be determined						
Total		6/8	Best: 6th	19	3	6	10	20	30	23	12	7	3	57	17	—

Note

^{1}: The under-22 team played at the 2013 edition.
*: Denotes draws including knockout matches decided on penalty kicks.

AFC U-23 Asian Cup history
Year	Round	Date	Opponent	Result	Stadium
(Qatar) 2016	Group stage	13 January	Saudi Arabia	D 1–1	Grand Hamad Stadium, Doha
(Qatar) 2016	Group stage	16 January	Japan	L 0–4	Grand Hamad Stadium, Doha
(Qatar) 2016	Group stage	19 January	North Korea	D 2–2	Grand Hamad Stadium, Doha
(China) 2018	Group stage	10 January	North Korea	L 0–1	Jiangyin Stadium, Jiangyin
(China) 2018	Group stage	13 January	Japan	L 0–1	Jiangyin Stadium, Jiangyin
(China) 2018	Group stage	16 January	Palestine	L 1–5	Changzhou Olympic Sports Centre, Changzhou
(Thailand) 2020	Group stage	8 January	Bahrain	W 5–0	Rajamangala Stadium, Bangkok
(Thailand) 2020	Group stage	11 January	Australia	L 1–2	Rajamangala Stadium, Bangkok
(Thailand) 2020	Group stage	14 January	Iraq	D 1–1	Rajamangala Stadium, Bangkok
(Thailand) 2020	Quarter-Final	18 January	Saudi Arabia	L 0–1	Thammasat Stadium, Khlong Luang
(Uzbekistan) 2022	Group stage	2 June	Vietnam	D 2–2	Milliy Stadium, Tashkent
(Uzbekistan) 2022	Group stage	5 June	Malaysia	W 3–0	Milliy Stadium, Tashkent
(Uzbekistan) 2022	Group stage	8 June	South Korea	L 0–1	Pakhtakor Stadium, Tashkent
(Qatar) 2024	Group stage	16 April	Iraq	W 2–0	Al Janoub Stadium, Al Wakrah
(Qatar) 2024	Group stage	19 April	Saudi Arabia	L 0–5	Khalifa International Stadium, Al Rayyan
(Qatar) 2024	Group stage	22 April	Tajikistan	L 0–1	Al Janoub Stadium, Al Wakrah
(Saudi Arabia) 2026	Group stage	9 January	Australia	L 1–2	Al-Shabab Club Stadium, Riyadh
(Saudi Arabia) 2026	Group stage	12 January	Iraq	D 1–1	Prince Faisal bin Fahd Sports City Stadium, Riyadh
(Saudi Arabia) 2026	Group stage	15 January	China	D 0–0	Al-Shabab Club Stadium, Riyadh

AFC U-23 Asian Cup history
First Match	Saudi Arabia 1–1 Thailand (13 January 2016; Doha, Qatar)
Biggest Win	Thailand 5–0 Bahrain (8 January 2020; Bangkok, Thailand)
Biggest Defeat	Thailand 0–5 Saudi Arabia (19 April 2024; Al Rayyan, Qatar)
Best Result	Quarter Finals at the 2020
Worst Result	Group stage at the 2016, 2018, 2022, 2024, 2026

=== Asian Games ===
Asian Games record
Year	Host country	Result	Position	GP	W	D*	L	GS	GA	Manager(s)
1951 to 1998^{1}		See Thailand national football team								
2002	South Korea	Fourth place	4th	6	4	0	2	10	7	Withe
2006	Qatar	Quarter-finals	7th	4	3	0	1	4	3	Charnwit
2010	China	Quarter-finals	7th	5	2	2	1	8	2	Robson
2014	South Korea	Fourth place	4th	7	5	0	2	15	3	Kiatisuk
2018	Indonesia	Group stage	18th	3	0	2	1	2	3	Worrawoot
2022	China	Round of 16	14th	4	0	2	2	2	8	Issara
2026	Japan	Quarter-finals	7th	4	2	0	2	8	9	Thawatchai
Total		7/7	Best: 4th	33	16	6	11	49	35	—

Note

^{1}: The senior national team played at the 1951 to 1998 editions.
*: Denotes draws including knockout matches decided on penalty kicks.

Asian Games history
First Match	Yemen 0–3 Thailand (27 September 2002; Changwon, South Korea)
Biggest Win	Thailand 6–0 Pakistan (7 November 2010; Guangzhou, China); Indonesia 0–6 Thailand (22 September 2014; Incheon, South Korea)
Biggest Defeat	Thailand 0–4 South Korea (21 September 2023; Jinhua, China)
Best Result	Fourth place at the 2002 and 2014
Worst Result	Group stage at the 2018

=== Southeast Asian Games ===
Southeast Asian Games record
Year	Host country	Result	Position	GP	W	D*	L	GS	GA	Manager(s)
1959 to 1999^{1}		See Thailand national football team								
2001	Malaysia	Gold	1st	6	6	0	0	15	2	Otkar
2003	Vietnam	Gold	1st	5	4	1	0	17	2	Carlos Roberto
2005	Philippines	Gold	1st	5	5	0	0	10	2	Charnwit
2007	Thailand	Gold	1st	5	5	0	0	18	3	Thongsuk
2009	Laos	Group stage	5th	4	2	1	1	15	3	Darby
2011	Indonesia	Group stage	7th	4	1	0	3	6	7	Prapol
2013	Myanmar	Gold	1st	6	4	2	0	10	3	Kiatisuk
2015	Singapore	Gold	1st	7	7	0	0	24	1	Choketawee
2017	Malaysia^{2}	Gold	1st	7	6	1	0	12	1	Worrawoot
2019	Philippines^{2}	Group stage	5th	5	3	1	1	14	4	Nishino
2021	Vietnam	Silver	2nd	6	4	0	2	13	3	Pölking
2023	Cambodia^{2}	Silver	2nd	6	4	1	1	15	8	Issara
2025	Thailand	Silver	2nd	4	3	0	1	12	4	Thawatchai
Total		13/13	Best: 1st	70	54	7	9	181	43	—

Note

^{1}: The senior national team played at the 1959 to 1999 editions.
^{2}: The under-22 national team.
*: Denotes draws including knockout matches decided on penalty kicks.

Southeast Asian Games history
First Match	Thailand 7–0 Cambodia (1 September 2001; Petaling Jaya, Malaysia)
Biggest Win	Timor-Leste 0–9 Thailand (8 December 2009; Vientiane, Laos)
Biggest Defeat	Indonesia 5–2 Thailand (16 May 2023; Phnom Penh, Cambodia)
Best Result	Gold medal at the 2001, 2003, 2005, 2007, 2013, 2015 and 2017
Worst Result	Group stage at the 2009, 2011 and 2019

=== AFF U-23 Championship ===
AFF U-23 Championship record
Year	Host country	Result	Position	GP	W	D*	L	GS	GA	Manager
2005	Thailand	Champions	1st	5	5	0	0	25	2	Charnwit
2019	Cambodia	Runners-up	2nd	5	2	2	1	5	2	Gama
2022	Cambodia	Runners-up	2nd	4	2	0	2	5	3	Garcia
2023	Thailand	Third place	3rd	5	3	1	1	9	3	Issara
2025	Indonesia	Third place	3rd	4	2	2	0	8	2	Thawatchai
Total		5/5	Best: 1st	23	14	5	4	52	12	—

Note

*: Denotes draws including knockout matches decided on penalty kicks.
*: The under-22 national team played at the 2019 edition onwards.

AFF U-23 Championship history
First Match	Laos 1–3 Thailand (29 August 2005; Bangkok, Thailand)
Biggest Win	Cambodia 0–8 Thailand (31 August 2005; Bangkok, Thailand)
Biggest Defeat	Thailand 1–3 Indonesia (24 August 2023; Rayong, Thailand)
Best Result	Champions at the 2005
Worst Result	Third Place at the 2023, 2025

=== Summer Universiade ===
Summer Universiade record
Year	Host country	Result	Position	GP	W	D*	L	GS	GA
2007	Thailand	Bronze medal	3rd	6	3	1	2	11	6
Total		1/1	Best: 3rd	6	3	1	2	11	6

Note

*: Denotes draws including knockout matches decided on penalty kicks.

== Head-to-head record ==
An all-time record table of Thailand national under-23 football team in major competitions only including; Summer Olympics, AFC U-23 Championship, M-150 Cup, Asian Games and Southeast Asian Games.

Thailand national under-23 football team all-time record
Opponent	Pld	W	D	L	GF	GA	GD	Win %
Australia	2	0	0	2	2	4	−2	00.00%
Bahrain	2	1	1	0	6	1	+3	50.00%
Bangladesh	4	3	1	0	11	3	+8	75.00%
Brunei	4	4	0	0	23	0	+23	100.00%
Cambodia	11	10	1	0	40	1	+39	90.91%
China	8	1	4	3	9	12	–3	12.50%
Chinese Taipei	2	2	0	0	12	0	+12	100.00%
Croatia	1	0	0	1	1	3	–2	00.00%
East Timor	6	6	0	0	21	1	+20	100.00%
Hong Kong	3	2	0	1	11	4	+5	66.67%
India	5	3	1	1	8	1	+7	60.00%
Indonesia	22	13	4	5	48	23	+25	59.09%
Iran	1	0	0	1	0	2	−2	00.00%
Iraq	7	1	3	3	6	7	−1	14.28%
Japan	9	1	0	8	3	25	−22	11.11%
Jordan	2	1	0	1	3	3	+0	50.00%
Kazakhstan	2	0	1	1	1	4	−3	00.00%
Kuwait	3	1	1	1	2	2	+0	33.33%
Kyrgyzstan	3	2	1	0	6	3	+3	66.67%
Laos	9	8	0	1	25	2	+23	88.89%
Lebanon	1	0	1	0	2	2	0	00.00%
Malaysia	16	10	2	4	23	10	+13	62.50%
Maldives	2	1	1	0	2	0	+2	50.00%
Mongolia	3	1	2	0	8	2	+6	33.33%
Myanmar	10	8	2	0	21	4	+17	80.00%
North Korea	8	1	3	4	6	11	−5	12.50%
Oman	1	0	1	0	1	1	+0	00.00%
Pakistan	1	1	0	0	6	0	+6	100.00%
Palestine	4	1	0	3	2	9	−7	25.00%
Philippines	7	7	0	0	29	3	+26	100.00%
Qatar	5	1	1	3	3	7	−4	20.00%
South Korea	8	0	0	8	3	18	−15	00.00%
Saudi Arabia	5	0	2	3	3	10	−7	00.00%
Singapore	9	8	0	1	21	4	+17	88.89%
Tajikistan	1	0	0	1	0	1	−1	00.00%
Turkmenistan	3	3	0	0	7	1	+6	100.00%
United Arab Emirates	7	2	0	5	9	14	–5	28.57%
Uzbekistan	1	0	0	1	0	1	−1	00.00%
Vietnam	21	8	6	7	29	22	+7	38.09%
Yemen	1	1	0	0	3	0	+3	100.00%
Total	214	109	38	67	407	223	+184	50.93%
Last match updated was against Hong Kong under-23 on 20 September 2026

== Honours ==
This is a list of honours for the Thailand national under-23 football team.

=== International titles ===
- Summer Universiade

- Bronze medal (1): 2007

- Asian Games

- Fourth place (2): 2002, 2014

=== Regional titles ===
- Southeast Asian Games

- Gold medal (7): 2001, 2003, 2005, 2007, 2013, 2015, 2017
- Silver medal (3): 2021, 2023, 2025

- AFF U-23 Championship

- Winners (1): 2005
- Runner-up (2): 2019, 2022
- Third place (2): 2023, 2025

=== Minor titles ===
- Dubai Cup

- Winners (1): 2017

- BIDC Cup (Cambodia)

- Winners (1): 2013

== See also ==
- Thailand national football team
- Thailand national under-21 football team
- Thailand national under-20 football team
- Thailand national under-17 football team
- Thailand national under-15 football team
- Football in Thailand
