= China national under-23 football team =

National association football team

China U-23
- Association: Chinese Football Association
- Confederation: AFC (Asia)
- Head coach: Antonio Puche
- Captain: Liu Haofan
- FIFA code: CHN
First colours	Second colours

Summer Olympics
- Appearances: 1 (first in 2008)
- Best result: Group stage (2008)

AFC U-23 Asian Cup
- Appearances: 6 (first in 2013)
- Best result: Runners-up (2026)

Asian Games
- Appearances: 7 (first in 2002)
- Best result: Bronze medalists (2026)

The China national under-23 football team, also known as the China Olympic team (国奥队), represents the People's Republic of China in international football competitions in the Olympic Games, Asian Games, as well as any other under-23 international football tournaments. It is governed by the Chinese Football Association (CFA). It combines two teams: China U-23 national team and China U-21 selection team.

== Competition history ==
* DNE = Did not enter; DNQ = Did not qualify; QBW = Qualified but withdrew.
* Pos = Position; P = Matches played; W = Matches won; D = Matches drawn; L = Matches lost; F = Goals for; A = Goals against.
* Denotes draws include knockout matches decided on penalty kicks.

=== Olympic Games record ===
- For 1900 to 1988, see China national football team.

Year	Result	Pos	P	W	D	L	F	A
1992 to 2004	did not qualify							
(China) 2008	Group stage	13	3	0	1	2	1	6
2012 to 2024	did not qualify							
Total*	-	-	8	0	2	6	1	17

* Including 1900 to 1988

=== Asian Games record ===
- For 1951 to 1998, see China national football team.

Year	Result	Pos	P	W	D	L	F	A
(South Korea) 2002	Quarter-finals	5	4	3	0	1	9	1
(Qatar) 2006	Quarter-finals	5	4	3	1	0	8	4
(China) 2010	Round of 16	12	4	2	0	2	5	7
(South Korea) 2014	Round of 16	14	3	1	0	2	1	5
(Indonesia) 2018	Round of 16	9	4	3	0	1	14	5
(China) 2022	Quarter-finals	7	5	3	1	1	10	3
(Japan) 2026	Bronze medal	3rd	6	2	3	1	8	5
Total*	-	-	30	17	5	8	55	30

* Including 1951 to 1998

Asian Games History
Year	Round	Score	Result
2002	Round 1	China 4–0 Turkmenistan	Win
2002	Round 1	China 3–0 Bangladesh	Win
2002	Round 1	China 2–0 India	Win
2002	Quarterfinals	China 0–1 Japan	Loss
2006	Round 1	China 1–0 Iraq	Win
2006	Round 1	China 3–1 Malaysia	Win
2006	Round 1	China 2–1 Oman	Win
2006	Quarterfinals	China 2–2 (7–8, penalties) Iran	Draw
2010	Round 1	China 0–3 Japan	Loss
2010	Round 1	China 2–1 Kyrgyzstan	Win
2010	Round 1	China 3–0 Malaysia	Win
2010	Round of 16	China 0–3 South Korea	Loss
2014	Round 1	China 0–3 North Korea	Loss
2014	Round 1	China 1–0 Pakistan	Win
2014	Round of 16	China 0–2 Thailand	Loss
2018	Round 1	China 6–0 Timor-Leste	Win
2018	Round 1	China 3–0 Syria	Win
2018	Round 1	China 2–1 United Arab Emirates	Win
2018	Round of 16	China 3–4 Saudi Arabia	Loss
2022	Round 1	China 5–1 India	Win
2022	Round 1	China 4–0 Myanmar	Win
2022	Round 1	China 0–0 Bangladesh	Draw
2022	Round of 16	China 1–0 Qatar	Win
2022	Quarter-finals	China 0–2 South Korea	Loss
2026	Round 1	China 2–1 North Korea	Win
2026	Round 1	China 0–0 Iran	Draw
2026	Round 1	China 0–0 United Arab Emirates	Draw
2026	Quarter-finals	China 3–0 Thailand	Win
2026	Semi-finals	China 1–2 South Korea	Loss
2026	3rd place match	China 2–2 (4–3, penalties) Uzbekistan	Draw

=== East Asian Games record ===
Year	Result	Pos	P	W	D	L	F	A
(China) 1993	Third place	3rd	5	3	1	1	21	5
(South Korea) 1997	Third place	3rd	5	3	1	1	15	7
(Japan) 2001	did not enter							
(Macau) 2005	Champions	1st	5	4	0	1	16	4
(Hong Kong) 2009	Group stage	5th	2	1	0	1	1	3
(China) 2013	Group stage	5th	4	0	1	3	1	7
Total	1 title	1st	21	11	3	7	54	26

=== AFC U-23 Asian Cup record ===
Olympic Games Qualification

Year	Result	Final Stage						Preliminary Stage					
Year	Result	M	W	D	L	F	A	M	W	D	L	F	A
(Oman) 2013	Group stage	3	0	0	3	2	5	5	3	2	0	12	3
(Qatar) 2016	Group stage	3	0	0	3	4	9	3	3	0	0	13	0
(China) 2018	Group stage	3	1	0	2	4	3	3	2	1	0	4	1
(Thailand) 2020	Group stage	3	0	0	3	0	4	3	2	1	0	15	2
(Uzbekistan) 2022	Withdrawn												
(Qatar) 2024	Group stage	3	1	0	2	2	4	2	1	1	0	2	1
(Saudi Arabia) 2026	Silver Medal	6	2	3	1	4	4	3	2	1	0	12	1
(Japan) 2028	To be determined												
Total	Runners-up	21	4	3	14	16	29	19	13	6	0	58	8

== Recent results and fixtures ==
Win Draw Loss

=== 2026 ===
3 January Friendly	Iran	0–0	China	Ras Al Khaimah, United Arab Emirates
				Stadium: Saud Bin Saqr Al Qasimi Stadium

8 January 2026 AFC U-23 Asian Cup GS	Iraq	0–0	China	Riyadh, Saudi Arabia
17:00		Report		Stadium: Prince Faisal bin Fahd Sports City Stadium; Attendance: 960; Referee: Asker Nadjafaliev (Uzbekistan)

11 January 2026 AFC U-23 Asian Cup GS	China	1–0	Australia	Riyadh, Saudi Arabia
14:30	Peng Xiao 43'	Report		Stadium: Al-Shabab Club Stadium; Attendance: 475; Referee: Thoriq Alkatiri (Indonesia)

14 January 2026 AFC U-23 Asian Cup GS	Thailand	0–0	China	Riyadh, Saudi Arabia
14:30		Report		Stadium: Al-Shabab Club Stadium; Attendance: 484; Referee: Abdulla Al-Marri (Qatar)

17 January 2026 AFC U-23 Asian Cup QF	Uzbekistan	0–0 (a.e.t.) (2–4 p)	China	Jeddah, Saudi Arabia
14:30		Report		Stadium: Prince Abdullah Al-Faisal Sports City Stadium; Attendance: 578; Referee: Ammar Mahfoodh (Bahrain)
	Penalties
	Bakhromov (penalty scored); Saidnurullaev (penalty scored); Karimov (penalty missed); Abdullaev (penalty missed)		(penalty scored) Liu Haofan; (penalty scored) Peng Xiao; (penalty scored) Xiang Yuwang; (penalty missed) Yang Haoyu; (penalty scored) Wang Bohao

20 January 2026 AFC U-23 Asian Cup SF	Vietnam	0–3	China	Jeddah, Saudi Arabia
18:30		Report	Peng Xiao 47'; Xiang Yuwang 52'; Wang Yudong 90+8'	Stadium: Prince Abdullah Al-Faisal Sports City Stadium; Attendance: 1,141; Referee: Alex King (Australia)

24 January 2026 AFC U-23 Asian Cup Final	China	0–4	Japan	Jeddah, Saudi Arabia
18:00		Report	Ozeki 12'; Ogura 20', 76'; Satō 59' (pen.)	Stadium: Prince Abdullah Al-Faisal Sports City Stadium; Attendance: 8,188; Referee: Faisal Al-Balawi (Saudi Arabia)

25 March Xi'an Tournament	China	2–2	Thailand	Xi'an, China
19:35 UTC+8	Xiang Yuwang 50'; Li Xinxiang 67'	Report	Mamah 22'; Saelao 35'	Stadium: Xi'an International Football Center; Attendance: 17,318; Referee: Maimaitijiang (China)

28 March Xi'an Tournament	China	1–1	North Korea	Xi'an, China
19:35 UTC+8	Xiang Yuwang 87' (pen.)	Report	Ri Kwang-myong 23'	Stadium: Xi'an International Football Center; Attendance: 42,613; Referee: Dai Yige (China)

31 March Xi'an Tournament	China	1–0	Vietnam	Xi'an, China
19:35 UTC+8	Du Yuezheng 39'	Report		Stadium: Xi'an International Football Center; Attendance: 16,163; Referee: Tang Shunqi (China)

6 June Friendly	China	1–0	Tajikistan	Zunyi, China
15:30 UTC+8	He Yiran 90+7'	Report		Stadium: Zunyi Olympic Sports Centre Stadium; Attendance: 13,198; Referee: Ma Yunkun（China）

9 June Friendly	China	3–0	Tajikistan	Guiyang, China
19:35 UTC+8	Mutellip Iminqari 2'; Zhang Aihui 37'; Xiang Yuwang 67' (pen.)	Report		Stadium: Guiyang Olympic Sports Center; Attendance: 32,476; Referee: Wang Jing（China）

12 June Friendly	China	4–0	Hong Kong	Dalian, China
16:00 UTC+8				Stadium: Dalian Youth Football Training Base

15 June Friendly	China	3–0	Hong Kong	Dalian, China
16:00 UTC+8				Stadium: Dalian Youth Football Training Base

16 September Asian Games GS	China	2–1	North Korea	Kariya, Japan
19:00 UTC+9	Zhang Yuning 44'; Wu Xi 68'	Report	Choe Kuk 27'	Stadium: Wave Stadium Kariya; Attendance: 1,185; Referee: Meder Taichiev (Kyrgyzstan)

20 September Asian Games GS	Iran	0–0	China	Kariya, Japan
14:00 UTC+9		Report		Stadium: Wave Stadium Kariya; Attendance: 934; Referee: Firdavs Nosafarov (Uzbekistan)

23 September Asian Games GS	China	0–0	United Arab Emirates	Toyota, Japan
14:30 UTC+9		Report		Stadium: Toyota Stadium; Attendance: 7,501; Referee: Ahmad A'Qashah (Singapore)

26 September Asian Games QF	China	3–0	Thailand	Toyota, Japan
15:00 UTC+9	Sangtong 45+1' (o.g.); Hu Hetao 47'; Zhang Yuning 63'	Report		Stadium: Toyota Stadium; Attendance: 7,587; Referee: Hiroki Kasahara (Japan)

30 September Asian Games SF	South Korea	2–1	China	Osaka, Japan
15:00 UTC+9	Lee Young-jun 33'; Bae Jun-ho 82'	Report	Wang Yudong 22'	Stadium: Nagai Stadium; Attendance: 4,470; Referee: Sadullo Gulmurodi (Tajikistan)

3 October Asian Games 3rd Place	China	2–2 (4–3 p)	Uzbekistan	Toyota, Japan
15:00 UTC+9	Hu Hetao 15'; Wang Yudong 53'	Report	Bakhromov 42'; Shodiboev 89'	Stadium: Toyota Stadium; Attendance: 13,770; Referee: Tuan Yaasin (Malaysia)
	Penalties
	Liu Haofan (penalty missed); Zhu Chenjie (penalty scored); Xiang Yuwang (penalty scored); Imran Memet (penalty scored); Peng Xiao (penalty scored)		(penalty missed) Reimov; (penalty scored) Murtazaev; (penalty missed) Shodiboev; (penalty scored) Ormonjonov; (penalty scored) Bakhromov

== Olympic Games fixtures ==
=== 2008 Olympic Games ===
- Football at the 2008 Summer Olympics – Men's tournament

All times local (GMT+8)

2008-08-07
19:45

China	1–1	New Zealand
Dong Fangzhuo 88'	(Report)	Brockie 53'

Shenyang Olympic Stadium, Shenyang
Attendance: 41,407
Referee: Martín Vázquez (Uruguay)

2008-08-10
19:45

Belgium	2–0	China
Dembélé 8'; Mirallas 80'	(Report)

Shenyang Olympic Stadium, Shenyang
Attendance: 45,756
Referee: Héctor Baldassi (Argentina)

2008-08-13
19:45

China	0–3	Brazil
	(Report)	Diego 18'; Thiago Neves 69', 73'

Qinhuangdao Olympic Sports Centre Stadium, Qinhuangdao
Attendance: 38,790
Referee: Jerome Damon (South Africa)

== Players ==
=== Current squad ===
The following players were called up for the 2026 Asian Games.

No.	Pos.	Player	Date of birth (age)	Club
1	GK	Yu Jinyong	6 July 2004 (aged 22)	(Chinese Football Association) Shandong Taishan
16	GK	Li Hao	6 March 2004 (aged 22)	(Chinese Football Association) Qingdao West Coast
12	GK	Yao Haoyang	28 October 2006 (aged 19)	(Chinese Football Association) Chongqing Tonglianglong
4	DF	Shi Songchen	30 December 2005 (aged 20)	(Chinese Football Association) Shandong Taishan
17	DF	He Yiran	27 February 2005 (aged 21)	(Chinese Football Association) Chengdu Rongcheng
2	DF	Hu Hetao	5 October 2003 (aged 22)	(Chinese Football Association) Chengdu Rongcheng
21	DF	Peng Xiao	28 July 2005 (aged 21)	(Chinese Football Association) Shandong Taishan
5	DF	Zhu Chenjie*	23 August 2000 (aged 26)	(Chinese Football Association) Shanghai Shenhua
3	DF	Liu Haofan	23 October 2003 (aged 22)	(Chinese Football Association) Zhejiang FC
23	DF	Alex Yang	13 June 2005 (aged 21)	(Chinese Football Association) Shanghai Port
15	MF	Wu Xi*	19 February 1989 (aged 37)	(Chinese Football Association) Shanghai Shenhua
13	MF	Mutellip Iminqari	2 May 2004 (aged 22)	(Chinese Football Association) Chengdu Rongcheng
22	MF	Mao Weijie	28 May 2005 (aged 21)	(Chinese Football Association) Dalian Yingbo
14	MF	Imran Memet	3 May 2005 (aged 21)	(Chinese Football Association) Shandong Taishan
	MF	Li Zhenquan	16 December 2003 (aged 22)	(Chinese Football Association) Chongqing Tonglianglong
20	MF	Yang Haoyu	25 May 2006 (aged 20)	(Chinese Football Association) Shanghai Shenhua
18	MF	Chen Zeshi	21 February 2005 (aged 21)	(Chinese Football Association) Shandong Taishan
6	MF	Xu Bin	2 May 2004 (aged 22)	(The Football Association) Wolverhampton Wanderers
11	MF	Kuai Jiwen	28 February 2006 (aged 20)	(Chinese Football Association) Shanghai Port
	MF	Zhang Zhixiong	27 September 2005 (aged 20)	(Chinese Football Association) Chongqing Tonglianglong
9	FW	Zhang Yuning*	5 January 1997 (aged 29)	(Chinese Football Association) Beijing Guoan
7	FW	Xiang Yuwang	18 December 2003 (aged 22)	(Chinese Football Association) Chongqing Tonglianglong
10	FW	Wang Yudong	23 November 2006 (aged 19)	(Chinese Football Association) Zhejiang FC
19	FW	Behram Abduweli	8 March 2003 (aged 23)	(Chinese Football Association) Chengdu Rongcheng
8	FW	Li Xinxiang	30 November 2005 (aged 20)	(Chinese Football Association) Shanghai Port

* Over-aged player.

=== Previous squads ===
Olympic Games

- 2008 Summer Olympics squads – China

Asian Games

- 2002 Asian Games squads – China
- 2006 Asian Games squads – China
- 2010 Asian Games squads – China
- 2014 Asian Games squads – China
- 2018 Asian Games squads – China
- 2022 Asian Games squads – China
- 2026 Asian Games squads – China

AFC U-23 Asian Cup

- 2013 AFC U-22 Championship
- 2016 AFC U-23 Championship
- 2018 AFC U-23 Championship
- 2020 AFC U-23 Championship
- 2024 AFC U-23 Asian Cup
- 2026 AFC U-23 Asian Cup

=== Overage players in Olympic Games ===
Tournament	Player 1	Player 2	Player 3
2008	Li Weifeng (DF)	Zheng Zhi (MF)	Han Peng (FW)

== Captains ==
Period	Captain	Vice Captain	Third Captain
1990–1992	Fan Zhiyi	Xu Hong	—
1993–1994	Zhang Enhua	Yang Chen	—
1995–1996	Shen Si	Zhang Enhua	–
1998–1999	Li Weifeng	Zhang Ran	—
2001–2004	Du Wei	Hu Zhaojun	—
2006	Chen Tao	—	—
2006 Asian Games	Zheng Zhi	—	—
2007	Chen Tao	Feng Xiaoting	Zhou Haibin
2007–2008	Li Weifeng	Zhou Haibin	—
2008 Olympic Games	Zheng Zhi	Li Weifeng	Zhou Haibin
2009–2010	Zhang Linpeng	Wu Xi	Piao Cheng
2010 Asian Games	Wang Dalei	Zhang Linpeng	Wu Xi
2011	Wang Dalei	Zhang Linpeng	Wu Xi
2012	Jin Jingdao	—	—
2013–2014	Shi Ke	Wang Tong	—
2014 Asian Games	Shi Ke	Li Ang	—
2015	Wang Tong	Shi Ke	—
2016	Chen Zhechao	Cheng Jin	—
2017–2018	He Chao	Gao Zhunyi	—
2019–2020	Huang Zhengyu	—	
2022–2023	Tao Qianglong	—	
2024	Afrden Asqer	—	
2025–	Liu Haofan	Xu Bin	

== Coaching staff ==
Position	Name
Head coach	(Spain) Antonio Puche
Assistant coaches	Pepe de la Sagra
Assistant coaches	David Campillo Quirante
Assistant coaches	Huang Bowen
Goalkeeping coaches	Tomo Gluic
Fitness coaches	Nacho Bondia
Fitness coaches	Huang Bowen
Video analysts	(China) Zhang Bin
Video analysts	(China) Jiang Yong
Match analyst	(China) Sui Han
Doctors	(China) Wang Shucheng
Team coordinator	(China) Yuan Jiayang
Physiotherapist	Vacant

=== List of head coaches ===
Manage records only includes international results.

- From 1981–1983 as "China Expectful team", 1983–1990 as "China B team".

Name	Period	Played	Won	Drawn	Lost	GF	GA	Win %	Achievements
(China) Zhang Shixun	1981	0	0	0	0	0	0	—	
(China) Zhang Jingtian	1982–1984	13	6	2	5	24	13	46.15%	
(China) Zhang Honggen	1985	5	4	0	1	15	6	80.00%	
(China) Xu Genbao	1987–1990	18	6	6	6	24	23	33.33%	

- as China National Olympic team.

Name	Period	Played	Won	Drawn	Lost	GF	GA	Win %	Achievements
(China) Xu Genbao	May 1990 – Jan 1992	21	15	4	2	78	14	71.43%	
(China) Qi Wusheng	Mar 1993 – Sep 1993	8	3	2	3	22	11	37.50%	
(Federal Republic of Yugoslavia) Radivoje Ognjanović	Sep 1993 – Nov 1994	1	1	0	0	3	0	100%	
(China) Qi Wusheng	Nov 1994 – Mar 1996	17	10	3	4	44	25	58.82%	
(England) Bobby Houghton	Oct 1998 – Nov 1999	21	15	2	4	46	11	71.43%	
(China) Shen Xiangfu	Dec 2001 – May 2004	35	16	7	12	56	38	45.71%	
(China) Jia Xiuquan	Apr 2006 – Oct 2006	7	1	2	4	1	7	14.23%	
(Serbia) Ratomir Dujković	Nov 2006 – Jul 2008	26	11	10	5	34	27	42.31%	
(China) Yin Tiesheng	Jul 2008 – Aug 2008	5	1	2	2	2	6	20.00%	
(Bosnia and Herzegovina) Miroslav Blažević	Nov 2010 – Aug 2011	5	2	1	2	4	4	50.00%	
(China) Fu Bo	Mar 2012 – Jan 2016	56	19	12	25			33.93%	
(China) Chen Yang	Sep 2016 – Feb 2017	9	4	2	3			44.44%	
(Italy) Massimiliano Maddaloni	Mar 2017 – Sep 2019	20	9	6	5			45%	
(Serbia) Aleksandar Janković	Feb 2021 – Mar 2023	2	1	0	1			50%	
(China) Cheng Yaodong	Mar 2023 – May 2024	9	4	1	4			44.45%	
(Spain) Antonio Puche	Aug 2024 – Present	32	14	14	4			43.75%	

== Head-to-head record ==
The following table shows China's head-to-head record in the Football at the Summer Olympics and AFC U-23 Asian Cup.

=== In Football at the Summer Olympics ===
Opponent	Pld	W	D	L	GF	GA	GD	Win %
Belgium	1	0	0	1	0	2	−2	0.00
Brazil	1	0	0	1	0	3	−3	0.00
New Zealand	1	0	1	0	1	1	+0	0.00
Total	3	0	1	2	1	6	−5	0.00

=== In AFC U-23 Asian Cup ===
Opponent	Pld	W	D	L	GF	GA	GD	Win %
Australia	1	1	0	0	1	0	+1	100.00
Iran	2	0	0	2	2	4	−2	0.00
Iraq	2	0	1	1	0	1	−1	0.00
Japan	2	0	0	2	0	5	−5	0.00
Oman	1	1	0	0	3	0	+3	100.00
Qatar	2	0	0	2	2	5	−3	0.00
Saudi Arabia	1	0	0	1	1	2	−1	0.00
South Korea	2	0	0	2	0	3	−3	0.00
Syria	1	0	0	1	1	3	−2	0.00
Thailand	1	0	1	0	0	0	+0	0.00
United Arab Emirates	1	1	0	0	2	1	+1	100.00
Uzbekistan	4	0	1	3	1	5	−4	0.00
Vietnam	1	1	0	0	3	0	+3	100.00
Total	21	4	3	14	16	29	−13	19.05

== See also ==
- China national football team
