= 2026 CFA Team China Cup =

2026 CFA Team China
2026中国之队·西安国际青年足球锦标赛

Tournament details
- Host country: China
- City: Xi'an
- Dates: 25–31 March
- Teams: 4 (from 2 sub-confederations)
- Venues: 2 (in 1 host city)

Final positions
- Champions: North Korea (1st title)
- Runners-up: China
- Third place: Thailand
- Fourth place: Vietnam

Tournament statistics
- Matches played: 6
- Goals scored: 14 (2.33 per match)
- Top scorer(s): (China) Xiang Yuwang (North Korea) An Kyong-ung (2 goal each)

The 2026 CFA Team China, also known as CFA Team China International Youth Tournament Xi’an 2026 (Chinese: 2026中国之队·西安国际青年足球锦标赛; pinyin: 2026 Nián CFA zhōngguó duì – xī'ān) was the third edition of the under-23 CFA Cup organised by the Chinese Football Association (CFA), an invitational under-22 football tournament held in Xi'an, China from 25 to 31 March 2026.

== Format ==
The four invited teams played a round-robin tournament. Points awarded in the group stage followed the formula of three points for a win, one point for a draw, and zero points for a loss. A tie in points was decided by goal differential.

== Participating teams ==
In February 2026, it was announced that hosts China had invited North Korea, Thailand and Iran to participate in the 2026 CFA Team China Cup.

On 5 March 2026, Iran withdrew the competition due to 2026 Iran war. The Chinese Football Association (CFA) announced Vietnam as a replacement for Iran.

Team	Sub-confederation
China (host)	EAFF
North Korea	EAFF
Vietnam (Note: Vietnam replaced Iran after the latter's withdrawal due to 2026 Iran war.)	AFF
Thailand	AFF

== Venue ==
Xi'an
Xi'an International Football Center	Fengdong Football Park East Stadium
Capacity: 60,000	Capacity: 500
2026 CFA Team China Cup is located in China

== Standings ==
Pos	Team	Pld	W	D	L	GF	GA	GD	Pts	
1	North Korea	3	1	2	0	5	3	+2	5	Champions
2	China (H)	3	1	2	0	4	3	+1	5	Runners-up
3	Thailand	3	1	1	1	4	5	−1	4	Third place
4	Vietnam	3	0	1	2	1	3	−2	1	Fourth place

Source: CFA
Rules for classification: 1) points; 2) goal difference; 3) goals scored; 4) head-to-head points; 5) head-to-head goal difference; 6) head-to-head number of goals scored; 7) Disciplinary points (yellow card = 1 point, red card as a result of two yellow cards = 3 points, direct red card = 3 points, yellow card followed by direct red card = 4 points).
(H) Hosts

== Results ==
All match times are local, (UTC+8).

25 March 2026
15:00

Vietnam	1–1	North Korea
Nguyễn Minh Tâm 6'	Report	An Kyong-ung 80'

Fengdong Football Park East Stadium, Xi'an
25 March 2026
19:35

China	2–2	Thailand
Xiang Yuwang 50'; Li Xinxiang 67'	Report	Jehhanafee 22'; Chawanwit 35'

Xi'an International Football Center, Xi'an
Attendance: 17,318
Referee: Maimaitijiang (China)

28 March 2026
15:00

Thailand	1–0	Vietnam
Thanakrit 1'	Report

Fengdong Football Park East Stadium, Xi'an
Referee: Ma Ning (China)
28 March 2026
19:35

China	1–1	North Korea
Xiang Yuwang 87' (pen.)	Report	Ri Kwang-myong 24'

Xi'an International Football Center, Xi'an
Attendance: 42,613
Referee: Dai Yige (China)

31 March 2026
15:00

North Korea	3–1	Thailand
An Kyong-ung 19'; Ri Il-song 28' (pen.); Choe Kuk 86'	Report	Jehhanafee 52'

Fengdong Football Park East Stadium, Xi'an
Referee: Maimaitijiang (China)
31 March 2026
19:35

China	1–0	Vietnam
Du Yuezheng 39'	Report

Xi'an International Football Center, Xi'an
Attendance: 16,163
Referee: Tang Shunqi (China)

== Goalscorers ==
There were 14 goals scored in 6 matches, for an average of 2.33 goals per match.

2 goals

- (China) Xiang Yuwang
- (North Korea) An Kyong-ung
- (Thailand) Jehhanafee Mamah

1 goal

- (Vietnam) Nguyễn Minh Tâm
- (China) Du Yuezheng
- (China) Li Xinxiang
- (North Korea) Ri Il-song
- (North Korea) Choe Kuk
- (North Korea) Ri Kwang-myong
- (Thailand) Thanakrit Chotmuangpak
- (Thailand) Chawanwit Saelao
