= Jehhanafee Mamah =

Thai footballer (born 2005)

Personal information
- Full name: Jehhanafee Mamah
- Date of birth: 24 October 2005 (age 21)
- Place of birth: Pattani, Thailand
- Height: 1.75 m (5 ft 9 in)
- Position: Centre-forward

Team information
- Current team: PT Prachuap
- Number: 48

Youth career
- 2017–2020: Pirayanawin Khlonghin Wittaya School
- 2021: Pattani

Senior career*
Years	Team	Apps	(Gls)
2021–2023	Pattani	17	(2)
2023–2024	Yala	23	(6)
2025–	PT Prachuap	8	(0)

International career
2026–	Thailand U23	6	(5)
2026–	Thailand	6	(1)
Medal record
Thailand under-23
CFA Team China Cup
Third place	Xi'an Tournament 2026	2026
Thailand
ASEAN Championship
Runner-up	Hyundai Cup 2026	Team
- * Club domestic league appearances and goals as of 26 July 2026

Jehhanafee Mamah (Thai: เจะฮานาฟี มามะ, pronounced [t͡ɕeʔ.haː.naː.fiː maː.maʔ]; born 24 October 2005) is a Thai professional footballer who plays as a centre-forward for Thai League 1 club PT Prachuap and the Thailand national team. He came through the youth system of Pirayanawin Khlonghin Wittaya School before making his professional debut with Pattani in 2021 and earning his first senior international cap in 2026.

== Club career ==
=== Pattani ===
Jehhanafee developed at Pirayanawin Khlonghin Wittaya School before joining Pattani's youth ranks. He was promoted to the club's senior team in June 2021 at the age of 15 and made his professional debut on 26 September 2021, becoming the youngest player to appear for the club. On 30 October 2022, he scored his first senior goal against Phuket Andaman, becoming Pattani's youngest-ever goalscorer.

=== F.C. Yala ===
Ahead of the 2023–24 season, Jehhanafee joined Yala. During his only season with the club, he scored a hat-trick against Nara United in the final league match of the campaign, accounting for all three of his league goals that season.

=== PT Prachuap ===
In the second leg of the 2024–25 season, Jehhanafee signed with Thai League 1 club PT Prachuap. He made his Thai League 1 debut on 26 January 2025, appearing in a 2–0 home victory over Chiangrai United.

== International career ==
=== Youth ===
In August 2025, Jehhanafee was called up to the Thailand under-23 squad for the 2026 AFC U-23 Asian Cup qualification, but remained an unused substitute throughout the tournament after suffering an injury during the training camp.

He returned to the under-23 squad in March 2026 for the CFA Team China International Youth Tournament in Xi'an, where he scored his first international goal in a match against China. In June 2026, he was again selected for the Thailand U23 team during the FIFA international window.

=== Senior ===
In July 2026, Jehhanafee received his first senior call-up to the Thailand national team for the 2026 ASEAN Championship. He made his senior international debut on 25 July 2026, coming on as a 73rd-minute substitute in Thailand's 5–0 away victory over Laos. On 8 August, he made his first start for Thailand in the final group-stage match against Myanmar, where he also scored his first senior international goal, a penalty in the 52nd minute after a Myanmar player was penalised for handball following a VAR review, helping Thailand to a 2–0 victory at the Rajamangala Stadium.

== Career statistics ==
=== Club ===
As of 26 July 2026

Appearances and goals by club, season and competition
Club	Season	League				FA cup		League cup		T3 cup		Total	
Club	Season	Division		Apps	Goals	Apps	Goals	Apps	Goals	Apps	Goals	Apps	Goals
Pattani	2021–22	Thai League 3	Southern Region	8	0	—		0	0	—		8	0
Pattani	2022–23	Thai League 3	Southern Region	9	2	—		0	0	—		9	2
Pattani	Total			17	2	—		0	0	—		17	2
Yala	2023–24	Thai League 3	Southern Region	12	3	—		—		0	0	12	3
Yala	2024–25 (1st leg)	Thai League 3	Southern Region	11	3	—		—		—		11	3
Yala	Total			23	6	—		—		0	0	23	6
PT Prachuap	2024–25 (2nd leg)	Thai League 1		2	0	0	0	0	0	—		2	0
PT Prachuap	2025–26	Thai League 1		6	0	1	0	0	0	—		7	0
PT Prachuap	Total			8	0	1	0	0	0	—		9	0

=== International goals ===
==== Under-23 ====
Scores and results list Thailand's goal tally first.

List of international goals scored by Jehhanafee Mamah
No.	Date	Venue	Opponent	Score	Result	Competition
1.	25 March 2026	Xi'an International Football Center, Xi'an, China	China	1–0	2–2	2026 CFA Team China Cup
2.	31 March 2026	Fengdong Football Park East Stadium, Xi'an, China	North Korea	1–2	1–3	2026 CFA Team China Cup
3.	9 June 2026	True BG Stadium, Pathum Thani, Thailand	United Arab Emirates	2–5	2–5	Friendly
4.	16 September 2026	Toyota Stadium, Toyota, Japan	Kyrgyzstan	1–2	3–2	2026 Asian Games
5.	20 September 2026	Toyota Stadium, Toyota, Japan	Hong Kong	4–1	5–1	2026 Asian Games

==== Senior ====
Scores and results list Thailand's goal tally first.

List of international goals scored by Jehhanafee Mamah
No.	Date	Venue	Opponent	Score	Result	Competition
1.	8 August 2026	Rajamangala Stadium, Bangkok, Thailand	Myanmar	2–0	2–0	2026 ASEAN Championship
