= North Korea national under-23 football team =

National association football team

North Korea
- Association: DPR Korea Football Association
- Confederation: AFC (Asia)
- Head coach: Ri Kwang-chon
- Home stadium: Rungnado May Day Stadium
- FIFA code: PRK
First colours	Second colours

First international
- North Korea 1–0 China (Pyongyang, North Korea; 25 August 1990)

Biggest win
- Macau 0–13 North Korea (Taipa, Macau; 1 November 2005)

Biggest defeat
- Australia 4–0 North Korea (Chongqing, China; 17 November 2019)

AFC U-23 Asian Cup
- Appearances: 4 (first in 2013)
- Best result: Quarter-finals (2016)

Asian Games
- Appearances: 7 (first in 2002)
- Best result: Silver: (2014)

East Asian Games
- Appearances: 3 (first in 2005)
- Best result: Gold: (2013)

The North Korea national under-23 football team represents North Korea at football in the Asian Games as well as other under-23 international football tournaments including the AFC U-23 Asian Cup. It is governed by the DPR Korea Football Association.

== History ==
North Korea Olympic team was established in 1990. Their first competition was the 1st Pyongyang Tournament. They faced China in the semi-finals of the tournament and won 1–0, but was later defeated by Metalist Kharkov in the final.

North Korea won the gold medal in the 2013 East Asian Games. A year later, North Korea reached the final of the 2014 Asian Games, where they faced their archi-rival South Korea. North Korea lost 1–0 from a last minute goal in extra time and gained the silver medal.

In 2016, North Korea reached the quarter-finals of the AFC U-23 Championship, their best result in the tournament's competition as of 2026.

== Results and fixtures ==
Matches in last 12 months, as well as any future scheduled matches

Legend

Win Draw Lose Fixture

=== 2026 ===
25 March 2026 CFA Team China Cup	Vietnam	1–1	North Korea	Xi'an, China
15:00 UTC+8	Nguyễn Minh Tâm 6'	Report	An Kyong-ung 80'	Stadium: Fengdong Football Park East Stadium

28 March 2026 CFA Team China Cup	China	1–1	North Korea	Xi'an, China
15:00 UTC+8	Xiang Yuwang 87' (pen.)	Report	Ri Kwang-myong 24'	Stadium: Fengdong Football Park East StadiumXi'an International Football Center; Attendance: 42,613; Referee: Dai Yige (China)

31 March 2026 CFA Team China Cup	North Korea	3–1	Thailand	Xi'an, China
19:35 UTC+8	An Kyong-ung 19'; Ri Il-song 28' (pen.); Choe Kuk 86'	Report	Thiraphat 52'	Stadium: Fengdong Football Park East Stadium

16 September 2026 Asian Games GS	China	2–1	North Korea	Kariya, Japan
19:00 UTC+9	Zhang Yuning 44'; Wu Xi 68'	Report	Choe Kuk 27'	Stadium: Wave Stadium Kariya; Attendance: 1,185; Referee: Meder Taichiev (Kyrgyzstan)

20 September 2026 Asian Games GS	North Korea	0–0	United Arab Emirates	Kariya, Japan
19:00 UTC+9		Report		Stadium: Wave Stadium Kariya; Attendance: 1,139; Referee: Adam Kersey (Australia)

23 September 2026 Asian Games GS	Iran	1–4	North Korea	Kariya, Japan
14:30 UTC+9	Hosseinzadeh 17'	Report	Choe Kuk 41'; Ra Myong-song 44', 51'; Paek Chung-song 68'	Stadium: Wave Stadium Kariya; Attendance: 1,007; Referee: Sadullo Gulmurodi (Tajikistan)

26 September 2026 Asian Games QF	Japan	1–0	North Korea	Toyota, Japan
19:30 UTC+9				Stadium: Toyota Stadium

== Players ==
=== Current squad ===
The following 22 players were called up for the 2026 Asian Games.

Caps and goals as of 23 September 2026 after the match against Iran.

No.	Pos.	Player	Date of birth (age)	Caps	Goals	Club
1	GK	Kang Ju-hyok*	31 May 1997 (age 29)	27	0	(DPR Korea Football Association) Hwaebul
18	GK	Kim Ryong-ik	13 March 2003 (age 23)	3	0	(DPR Korea Football Association) Sobaeksu
21	GK	Hong Tae-han	30 January 2005 (age 21)	0	0	(DPR Korea Football Association) Ryomyong
2	DF	Jong Ye-won	28 October 2003 (age 23)	0	0	(DPR Korea Football Association) Kigwancha
3	DF	Kim Kum-chon	10 March 2003 (age 23)	3	0	(DPR Korea Football Association) Amnokgang
4	DF	Ri Song-hung	22 February 2005 (age 21)	3	0	(DPR Korea Football Association) Ryomyong
5	DF	Jong Hwi-nam	15 May 2003 (age 23)	6	0	(DPR Korea Football Association) Ryomyong
6	DF	Han Jae-yong	15 January 2006 (age 20)	6	0	(DPR Korea Football Association) Amnokgang
12	DF	Choe Ryong-il	23 March 2004 (age 22)	6	0	(DPR Korea Football Association) Ryomyong
16	DF	Kim Yu-song	18 July 2003 (age 23)	11	1	(DPR Korea Football Association) Amnokgang
19	DF	Hong Kwon-hwi	2 March 2003 (age 23)	1	0	(DPR Korea Football Association) Kyonggongopsong
7	MF	Ri Kum-chol	26 March 2004 (age 22)	3	0	(DPR Korea Football Association) Ryomyong
8	MF	Pak Hyok-song	10 January 2004 (age 22)	0	0	(DPR Korea Football Association) Kyonggongopsong
10	MF	Ri Il-song	14 January 2004 (age 22)	10	1	(DPR Korea Football Association) Ryomyong
11	MF	Yom Chol-gyong	9 August 2004 (age 22)	3	0	(DPR Korea Football Association) Ryomyong
14	MF	Ryang Kwang-myong	26 January 2003 (age 23)	6	1	(DPR Korea Football Association) Amnokgang
15	MF	Ra Myong-song	6 January 2003 (age 23)	6	2	(DPR Korea Football Association) Amnokgang
22	MF	Kim Kuk-bom*	19 February 1995 (age 31)	24	3	(DPR Korea Football Association) April 25
23	MF	An Kyong-ung	22 February 2004 (age 22)	5	2	(DPR Korea Football Association) Wolmido
9	FW	Ho Chol-myong	9 January 2003 (age 23)	1	0	(DPR Korea Football Association) Pyongyang
17	FW	Choe Kuk	21 March 2005 (age 21)	6	3	(DPR Korea Football Association) Wolmido
20	FW	Paek Chung-song*	25 February 2000 (age 26)	8	1	(DPR Korea Football Association) Ryomyong

* Over-aged player.

=== Recent call-ups ===
The following players have been called up for the team and are still available for selection.

Pos.	Player	Date of birth (age)	Caps	Goals	Club	Latest call-up
DF	Kim Sung-hye	15 January 2003 (age 23)	3	0	(North Korea) Sonbong	2026 CFA Team China Cup
DF	Jong Un-hyok	6 January 2007 (age 19)	0	0	(North Korea) Wolmido	2026 CFA Team China Cup
MF	Kim Kwon-song	4 January 2004 (age 22)	3	0	(North Korea) Unknown	2026 CFA Team China Cup
MF	Ho Chol-song	9 January 2003 (age 23)	0	0	(North Korea) Unknown	2026 CFA Team China Cup
FW	Ri Won-gwang		2	0	(North Korea) Ryomyong	2026 CFA Team China Cup
Players in **bold** have capped for the senior team.; ^{PRE} Preliminary squad; ^{INJ} Player withdrew from the squad due to an injury.; ^{SUS} Serving suspension.; ^{WD} Player withdrew from the squad due to other reasons.

=== Previous squads ===
AFC U-23 Asian Cup

- 2013 AFC U-22 Championship squads – North Korea
- 2016 AFC U-23 Championship squads – North Korea
- 2018 AFC U-23 Championship squads – North Korea
- 2020 AFC U-23 Championship squads – North Korea

Asian Games

- Football at the 2002 Asian Games squads – North Korea
- Football at the 2006 Asian Games squads – North Korea
- Football at the 2010 Asian Games squads – North Korea
- Football at the 2014 Asian Games squads – North Korea
- Football at the 2018 Asian Games squads – North Korea
- Football at the 2022 Asian Games squads – North Korea
- Football at the 2026 Asian Games squads – North Korea

=== Overage players in Asian Games ===
Tournament	Player 1	Player 2	Player 3
2002	Ri Man-chol (DF)	Han Song-chol (MF)	Jon Yong-chol (MF)
2006	So Hyok-chol (DF)	Hong Yong-jo (MF)	Mun In-guk (MF)
2010	Ri Kwang-chon (DF)	Kim Yong-jun (MF)	Pak Nam-chol (MF)

== Competitive record ==
=== Olympic Games ===
From 1992 Summer Olympics, at the first tournament to be played in an under-23 format.

Year	Round	GP	W	D*	L	GS	GA
(Spain) 1992	Did not qualify						
(United States) 1996	Did not enter						
2000 to 2020	Did not qualify						
(France) 2024	Withdrew						
Total	0/7	–	–	–	–	–	–

=== AFC U-23 Asian Cup ===
AFC U-23 Asian Cup record
Hosts / Year	Result	GP	W	D	L	GS	GA
(Oman) 2013	Round 1	3	1	1	1	3	2
(Qatar) 2016	Quarter-finals	4	0	2	2	6	8
(China) 2018	Round 1	3	1	1	1	3	4
(Thailand) 2020	Round 1	3	1	0	2	3	5
2022 to 2024	Withdrew						
(Saudi Arabia) 2026	Did not enter						
(Japan) 2028	To be determined						
Total	4/8	13	3	4	6	15	19

=== Asian Games ===
From 2002 Asian Games, at the first tournament to be played in an under-23 format.

Asian Games record
Hosts / Year	Result	GP	W	D	L	GS	GA
(South Korea) 2002	Quarter-finals	4	2	0	2	7	4
(Qatar) 2006	Quarter-finals	4	2	1	1	3	4
(China) 2010	Quarter-finals	5	4	1	0	9	0
(South Korea) 2014	Runners-up	6	5	0	1	11	2
(Indonesia) 2018	Quarter-finals	5	2	2	1	8	6
(China) 2022	Quarter-finals	5	4	0	1	7	6
(Japan) 2026	Quarter-finals	4	1	1	2	5	4
Total	7/7	33	20	5	8	50	26

=== East Asian Games ===
From 2001 East Asian Games, at the first tournament to be played in an under-23 format.

East Asian Games record
Hosts / Year	Result	GP	W	D	L	GS	GA
(Japan) 2001	did not enter						
(Macau) 2005	Runners-up	5	3	1	1	18	2
(Hong Kong) 2009	Fourth place	4	1	2	1	11	3
(China) 2013	Champions	4	3	1	0	12	5
Total	3/4	13	7	4	2	41	10
