= Pichitchai Sienkrathok =

Thai footballer (born 2003)

Personal information
- Full name: Pichitchai Sienkrathok
- Date of birth: 18 March 2003 (age 23)
- Place of birth: Sisaket, Thailand
- Height: 1.81 m (5 ft 11 in)
- Position: Centre back

Team information
- Current team: Ayutthaya United (on loan from Port)
- Number: 16

Youth career
- Khlong Khon Academy

Senior career*
Years	Team	Apps	(Gls)
2021–2022	Assawin Kohkwang United	3	(0)
2022–2023	Samut Songkhram	7	(0)
2023–2025	Police Tero	17	(0)
2024	→ Dragon Pathumwan Kanchanaburi (loan)	12	(0)
2025–	Port	0	(0)
2025	→ Police Tero (loan)	10	(1)
2026	→ Nakhon Ratchasima (loan)	5	(0)
2026–	→ Ayutthaya United (loan)	0	(0)

International career^{‡}
2025–2026	Thailand U23	15	(0)
2026–	Thailand	0	(0)
Medal record
Thailand under-23
SEA Games
Silver medal – second place	SEA Games 2025	Football
ASEAN U-23 Championship
Third place	ASEAN U-23 mandiri Cup 2025	2025
CFA Team China Cup
Third place	Xi'an Tournament 2026	2026
Thailand
ASEAN Championship
Runner-up	Hyundai Cup 2026	Team
- * Club domestic league appearances and goals as of 26 July 2026 ‡ National team caps and goals as of 26 July 2026

Pichitchai Sienkrathok (Thai: พิชิตชัย เศียรกระโทก, pronounced [pʰí.t͡ɕʰìt.t͡ɕʰāj sǐa̯n.krà.tʰòːk]; born 18 March 2003) is a Thai professional footballer who plays as a Centre back for Thai League 1 club Ayutthaya United, on loan from Thai League 1 club Port, and the Thailand national football team.

He began his senior career with Assawin Kohkwang United in 2021 and earned his first senior international call-up for Thailand in 2026.

== Club career ==
=== Assawin Kohkwang United ===
Pichitchai began his senior career with Thai League 3 club Assawin Kohkwang United during the 2021–22 season while still a student. He made his professional debut on the opening matchday of the 2021–22 Thai League 3 Eastern Region season, coming on as a 71st-minute substitute in a home match against Pluakdaeng United. During the mid-season break, he moved to Samut Songkhram province to continue his secondary education before joining Samut Songkhram ahead of the 2022–23 season.

=== Samut Songkhram ===
Ahead of the 2022–23 season, Pichitchai joined Thai League 3 side Samut Songkhram. While representing the club, he also continued his football development at Khlong Khon Academy in Samut Songkhram province. His performances during the season attracted the attention of Thai League 1 club Police Tero, who signed him ahead of the 2023–24 campaign.

=== Police Tero ===
Pichitchai signed for Police Tero ahead of the 2023–24 season and featured for the club during the first half of the campaign. In January 2024, he was loaned to Thai League 2 side Dragon Pathumwan Kanchanaburi for the remainder of the season to gain regular first-team experience. During his loan spell, Pichitchai scored the first goal of his senior career, netting a dramatic 118th-minute winner in a 1–0 extra-time victory over Phitsanulok Unity in the round of 16 of the 2023–24 Thai FA Cup, sending Dragon Pathumwan Kanchanaburi into the quarter-finals.

Police Tero were relegated from Thai League 1 at the end of the 2023–24 season, and Pichitchai returned to the club for the 2024–25 campaign in Thai League 2 after his loan spell expired. He established himself as a regular starter throughout the season and earned his first call-up to the Thailand under-23 national team for the 2025 Doha Cup.

=== Port ===
Ahead of the 2025–26 season, Pichitchai signed with Thai League 1 club Port. He was immediately loaned back to Police Tero for the first half of the campaign, where he scored his first league goal in a 1–0 away victory over Pattani on matchday three of the 2025–26 Thai League 2 season.

During the mid-season transfer window, Port recalled him before loaning him to fellow Thai League 1 side Nakhon Ratchasima Mazda for the remainder of the season. Although contracted to Port throughout the campaign, he did not make a competitive appearance for the club.

Ahead of the 2026–27 season, Port loaned Pichitchai to fellow Thai League 1 club Ayutthaya United for the remainder of the campaign.

== International career ==
=== Youth ===
Pichitchai received his first call-up to the Thailand under-23 national team for the 2025 Doha Cup in March 2025. He subsequently represented Thailand at the 2025 ASEAN U-23 Championship, helping the team secure a third-place finish, before appearing in the 2026 AFC U-23 Asian Cup qualification tournament later that year as Thailand qualified for the finals. He remained a regular member of the under-23 squad, representing Thailand at the 2025 SEA Games, where the team won the silver medal, and the 2026 AFC U-23 Asian Cup finals in Saudi Arabia. In March 2026, he also took part in the 2026 CFA Team China Cup, helping Thailand finish third. He was later called up for the under-23 squad's June 2026 FIFA international window but withdrew due to injury.

=== Senior ===
In July 2026, Pichitchai received his first call-up to the Thailand senior national team for the 2026 ASEAN Championship.

== Career statistics ==
=== Club ===
As of 26 July 2026

Appearances and goals by club, season and competition
Club	Season	League				FA cup		League cup		Other		Total	
Club	Season	Division		Apps	Goals	Apps	Goals	Apps	Goals	Apps	Goals	Apps	Goals
Assawin Kohkwang United	2021–22 (1st leg)	Thai League 3	Eastern Region	3	0	—		—		—		3	0
Assawin Kohkwang United	Total			3	0	—		—		—		3	0
Samut Songkhram	2022–23	Thai League 3	Western Region	7	0	1	0	4	0	—		17	0
Samut Songkhram	2022–23	Thai League 3	National Championship	5	0	1	0	4	0	—		17	0
Samut Songkhram	Total			12	0	1	0	4	0	—		17	0
Police Tero	2023–24 (1st leg)	Thai League 1		0	0	0	0	1	0	—		1	0
Police Tero	2024–25	Thai League 2		17	0	1	0	2	0	—		20	0
Police Tero	Total			17	0	1	0	3	0	—		21	0
Dragon Pathumwan Kanchanaburi (on loan from Police Tero)	2023–24 (2nd leg)	Thai League 2		12	0	3	1	0	0	—		15	1
Dragon Pathumwan Kanchanaburi (on loan from Police Tero)	Total			12	0	3	1	0	0	—		15	1
Police Tero (on loan from Port)	2025–26 (1st leg)	Thai League 2		10	1	1	0	1	0	—		12	1
Police Tero (on loan from Port)	Total			10	1	1	0	1	0	—		12	1
Nakhon Ratchasima Mazda (on loan from Port)	2025–26 (2nd leg)	Thai League 1		5	0	0	0	1	0	—		6	0
Nakhon Ratchasima Mazda (on loan from Port)	Total			5	0	0	0	1	0	—		6	0
Ayutthaya United (on loan from Port)	2026–27	Thai League 1								—			
Ayutthaya United (on loan from Port)	Total									—			
