= Zhang Aihui =

Chinese footballer (born 2005)

Personal information
- Full name: Zhang Aihui
- Date of birth: 27 May 2005 (age 21)
- Place of birth: Beijing, China
- Height: 1.91 m (6 ft 3 in)
- Positions: Centre-back; right-back

Team information
- Current team: Zhejiang FC
- Number: 38

Youth career
- 2017–2023: Tsinghua University High School
- 2023–2025: Zhejiang FC

Senior career*
Years	Team	Apps	(Gls)
2025–	Zhejiang FC	30	(1)

International career^{‡}
2024	China U19	1	(0)
2025–	China U23	4	(1)
2026–	China	1	(0)
Medal record
Men's football
Representing China
AFC U-23 Asian Cup
Runner-up	2026 Saudi Arabia	Team
- * Club domestic league appearances and goals as of 19 November 2026 ‡ National team caps and goals as of 16 January 2026

Zhang Aihui (simplified Chinese: 张瑷晖; traditional Chinese: 張璦暉; pinyin: Zhāng Àihuī; born 27 May 2005) is a Chinese professional footballer who plays as a centre-back or right-back for Chinese Super League club Zhejiang FC and the China national team.

== Early career ==
Born in the Haidian District of Beijing, Zhang Aihui's father, Zhang Wei, began taking him to football pitches to play when Zhang was one year old, and Zhang started receiving systematic football training as he entered primary school. In 2017, Zhang Aihui was accepted into the first edition of Tsinghua University High School's football program. While playing for his school in a China Youth Football League match in his senior year, he was scouted by Chinese Super League club Zhejiang FC, who were looking for a tall and agile centre-back. Zhang displayed his height advantage, strength, and pace, especially in the defensive end. After completing his Gaokao in the summer of 2023, he received an offer from both Zhejiang and from Beihang University. Beihang University provided Zhang with the option to take two gap years before starting university, allowing him to join Zhejiang's youth academy.

== Club career ==
Zhang Aihui represented the province of Zhejiang in their campaign in the 2025 National Games of China. In June 2025, Zhang played for Zhejiang U20 in the National Games qualifiers, while Zhejiang FC manager Raúl Caneda spectated on the sidelines. Caneda retrospectively praised Zhang, claiming he possessed the talent to play in the Chinese Super League. On 16 July 2025, Zhang Aihui was promoted to Zhejiang FC's first-team, and was given the number 81. After usual starters Liu Haofan and Wang Shiqin were both suspended for accumulating too many yellow cards, Zhang Aihui was put into the starting line-up for his debut in a home league match against Wuhan Three Towns on 27 July. Caneda explained to the media for his decision, saying he "saw Zhang's potential to play for the national team." On 20 September, he provided the assist for teammate Yago Cariello in the ninth minute of second-half added-time for the equalising goal of a 3–3 away league draw with Changchun Yatai. He started in eleven consecutive league matches since and including his debut, until the finals of the football event at the National Games.

== International career ==
In July 2024, Zhang Aihui was called up by China U19 for two friendlies against Iran. On 13 August 2024, he made his first appearance for any China youth level team in a 2–0 defeat to Iran. In late August 2024, he was selected for a China U19 training camp.

In October 2025, he was picked by China U22 for a training camp. In the following month, he was included in China U22 head coach Antonio Puche's 2025 Panda Cup squad.

On 27 September 2026, Zhang made his debut for the China national team in a friendly against New Zealand.

== Career statistics ==
=== Club ===
As of 22 November 2025

Appearances and goals by club, season, and competition
Club	Season	League			Cup		Continental		Other		Total	
Club	Season	Division	Apps	Goals	Apps	Goals	Apps	Goals	Apps	Goals	Apps	Goals
Zhejiang FC	2025	Chinese Super League	12	0	0	0	–		–		12	0
Career total			12	0	0	0	0	0	0	0	12	0

== Honours ==
China U23

- AFC U-23 Asian Cup runner-up: 2026
