= Aihui =

Aihui may refer to:

- Aihui District, in Heihe, Heilongjiang, China
- Aigun, or Aihui town, historic town of China in northern Manchuria, in Aihui District

== See also ==
- Zhang Aihui (born 2005), Chinese footballer
