= Charnwit Polcheewin =

Thai football coach (born 1955)

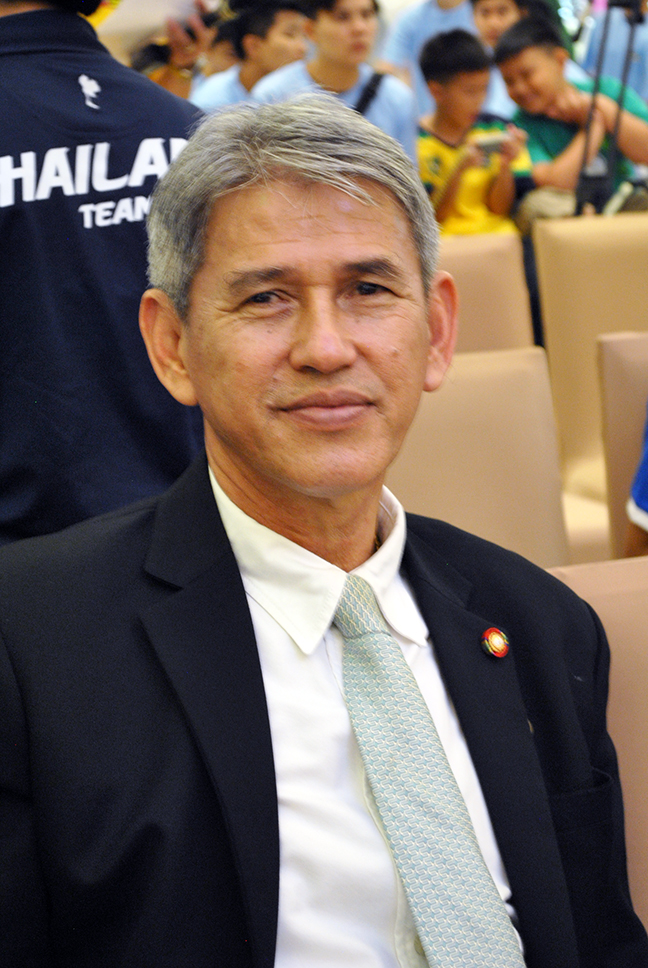
- Charnwit Polcheewin in 2015

Personal information
- Full name: Charnwit Polcheewin
- Date of birth: 23 April 1955 (age 71)
- Place of birth: Si Racha, Chonburi, Thailand

Senior career*
Years	Team	Apps	(Gls)
1978–1981	Rajpracha		

International career
1976	Thailand (B)		

Managerial career
- 1991–2000: Thai Farmers Bank
- 1996–1997: Thailand U16
- 1998: Thailand U19
- 2000–2002: Thailand U20
- 2001: Thailand women
- 2004: Thailand women
- 2004: Thailand U20
- 2005–2006: Thailand U23
- 2005–2008: Thailand
Medal record
Men's football
Representing Thailand (as manager)
AFF Championship
Runner-up	2007
- * Club domestic league appearances and goals

Charnwit Polcheewin (Thai: ชาญวิทย์ ผลชีวิน) is a Thai football coach.

== Managerial career ==
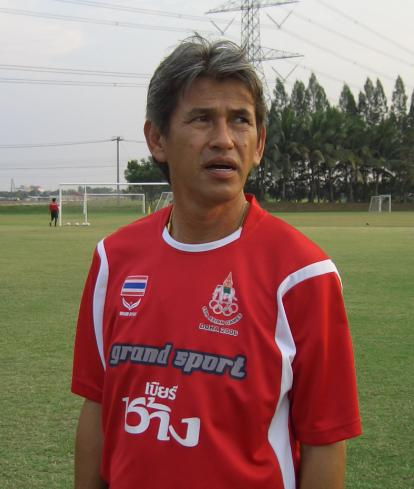
Charnwit Polcheewin, Thai footballer coaching the national team

In club level, he brought Thai Farmers Bank to two consecutive AFC Champions League (then Asian Club Championship) titles in 1993–94 and 1994–95. He coached Thailand during their successful campaign in the 2005 SEA Games. He resigned from the post on 20 February 2007 to coach Vietnamese club Đồng Tháp. However, as the transfer did not go through, he return to his post as the Thai national team coach. He was confirmed in this position in April 2007 after the election of the new FAT President and the appointment of a new executive committee.

Polcheewin left his post in the national team on 22 June 2008, after the 2010 World Cup qualifier game against Oman. In his final game, Thailand lost 1–2 to Oman. Polcheewin was again linked with the Vietnamese side Đồng Tháp on 20 November 2008, according to the Vietnam Bridge website.

== Political careers ==
Charnwit was appointed as senator in Senate of Thailand on 14 May 2019.

== Honours ==
=== Managers ===
Thai Farmers Bank

- AFC Champions League: 1994, 1995

Thailand

- SEA Games: 2005

Individual

- AFC Coach of the Year: 1994
