= Chawanwit Saelao =

Thai footballer (born 2004)

Personal information
- Full name: Chawanwit Saelao
- Date of birth: 12 September 2004 (age 22)
- Place of birth: Rayong, Thailand
- Height: 1.72 m (5 ft 8 in)
- Position: Winger

Team information
- Current team: Prime Bangkok
- Number: 8

Youth career
- 2018–2022: Surasakmontree School

Senior career*
Years	Team	Apps	(Gls)
2022–	Prime Bangkok	84	(33)

International career^{‡}
2024–2026	Thailand U23	17	(3)
2026–	Thailand	4	(0)
Medal record
Thailand U23
SEA Games
Silver medal – second place	SEA Games 2025	Football
ASEAN U-23 Championship
Third place	Mandiri Cup 2025	2025
CFA Team China Cup
Third place	Xi'an Tournament 2026	2026
Thailand
ASEAN Championship
Runner-up	Hyundai Cup 2026	Team
- * Club domestic league appearances and goals as of 26 July 2026 ‡ National team caps and goals as of 8 August 2026

Chawanwit Saelao (Thai: ชวัลวิทย์ แซ่เล้า, pronounced [t͡ɕʰā.wān.wít sɛ̂ː.lâw]; born 12 September 2004) is a Thai professional footballer who plays as a winger for Thai League 3 club Prime Bangkok and the Thailand national football team. He came through the youth system of Surasakmontree School before joining Prime Bangkok in 2022 and earned his first senior international cap in 2026.

== Club career ==
=== Prime Bangkok ===
Chawanwit began his football career at Surasakmontree School before joining Prime Bangkok's youth academy in 2022. Later that year, he was promoted to the club's senior team and made his debut in the Thai League 3. Primarily playing as a winger, Chawanwit quickly established himself as one of Prime Bangkok's key attacking players. During the 2025–26 season, he helped the club win the Thai League 3 Central Region title.

== International career ==
=== Youth ===
Chawanwit received his first call-up to the Thailand under-23 national team in 2025 for the 2025 ASEAN U-23 Championship, where he helped the team finish in third place. Later that year, he was included in Thailand's squad for the 2026 AFC U-23 Asian Cup qualification. Thailand finished as group winners and qualified for the final tournament. He was also selected for the Thailand squad at the 2025 Southeast Asian Games, helping the team win the silver medal in the men's football tournament.

In 2026, Chawanwit represented Thailand at the 2026 AFC U-23 Asian Cup in Saudi Arabia. Thailand were eliminated in the group stage after finishing bottom of their group. Later that year, he was selected for the 2026 CFA Team China Cup, where Thailand finished third.

=== Senior ===
Following his performances for the Thailand under-23 team, Chawanwit received his first call-up to the Thailand senior national team for the 2026 ASEAN Championship. He made his senior international debut during the tournament.

== Career statistics ==
=== Club ===
As of 26 July 2026

Appearances and goals by club, season and competition
Club	Season	League				FA cup		League cup		T3 cup		Total	
Club	Season	Division		Apps	Goals	Apps	Goals	Apps	Goals	Apps	Goals	Apps	Goals
Prime Bangkok	2022–23	Thai League 3	Bangkok Metropolitan Region	25	3	5	5	1	0	—		31	8
Prime Bangkok	2023–24	Thai League 3	Bangkok Metropolitan Region	24	12	3	4	4	3	4	5	35	24
Prime Bangkok	2024–25	Thai League 3	Central Region	18	7	1	1	3	3	5	5	27	16
Prime Bangkok	2025–26	Thai League 3	Central Region	17	11	3	2	0	0	0	0	26	18
Prime Bangkok	2025–26	Thai League 3	National Championship	6	5	3	2	0	0	0	0	26	18
Prime Bangkok	Total			90	38	12	12	8	6	9	10	119	66

=== International goals ===
==== Under-23 ====
Scores and results list Thailand's goal tally first.

List of international goals scored by Chawanwit Saelao
No.	Date	Venue	Opponent	Score	Result	Competition
1.	19 July 2025	Patriot Stadium, Bekasi, Indonesia	Timor-Leste	4–0	4–0	2025 ASEAN U-23 Championship
2.	1 September 2025	Thammasat Stadium, Pathum Thani, Thailand	Mongolia	5–0	6–0	2026 AFC U-23 Asian Cup qualification
3.	25 March 2026	Xi'an International Football Center, Xi'an, China	China	2–0	2–2	2026 CFA Team China Cup
