= Liu Haofan =

Chinese footballer (born 2003)

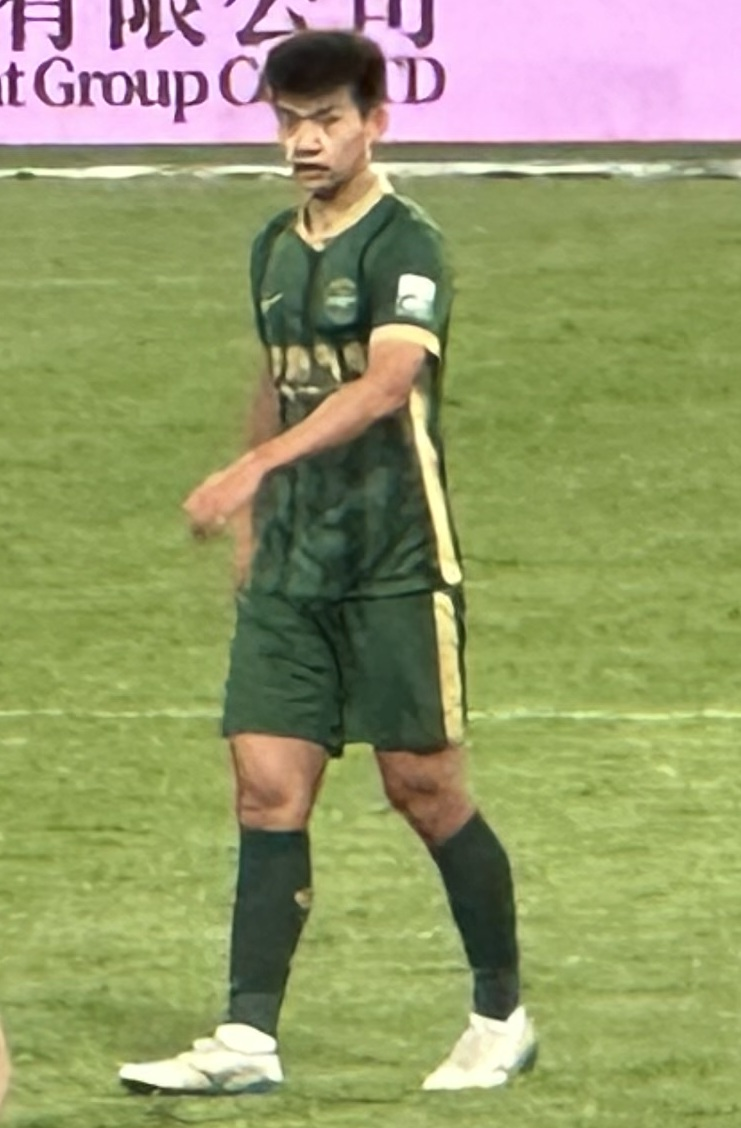
- Liu Haofan in April 2025

Personal information
- Full name: Liu Haofan
- Date of birth: 23 October 2003 (age 23)
- Place of birth: Wuhan, Hubei, China
- Height: 1.85 m (6 ft 1 in)
- Position: Centre-back

Team information
- Current team: Zhejiang FC
- Number: 5

Youth career
- –2022: Zhejiang FC

Senior career*
Years	Team	Apps	(Gls)
2022–	Zhejiang FC	79	(0)

International career^{‡}
2022–2023	China U20	8	(0)
2023–2026	China U23	28	(1)
2025–	China	7	(0)
Medal record
Representing China
Men's football
EAFF Championship
Bronze medal – third place	2025 South Korea	Team
AFC U-23 Asian Cup
Runner-up	2026 Saudi Arabia	Team
Asian Games
Bronze medal – third place	2026 Aichi–Nagoya	Team
- * Club domestic league appearances and goals as of 19 November 2026 ‡ National team caps and goals as of 20 November 2025

Liu Haofan (simplified Chinese: 刘浩帆; traditional Chinese: 劉浩帆; pinyin: Liú Hàofān; born 23 October 2003) is a Chinese professional footballer who plays as a centre-back for Chinese Super League club Zhejiang FC and the China national team.

== Early life ==
Born in Wuhan, Hubei, Liu Haofan was educated at No. 5 Primary School of Qianchuan Street, Huangpi District, where he trained football in his six-year spell.

== Club career ==
=== Zhejiang ===
On 18 May 2022, after progressing through the Zhejiang FC youth ranks, he was named in the club's first-team squad for the 2022 Chinese Super League season. On 9 October 2022, he made his senior and professional debut, in a 3–0 away league win over Wuhan Yangtze River, coming on as a second-half injury-time substitute for Gu Bin. By the end of the 2022 season, he earned ten appearances for the club, with seven in the league and three in the Chinese FA Cup. On 20 September 2023, Liu Haofan made his AFC Champions League debut, in a 4–1 loss to Thai club Buriram United, coming on for Leung Nok Hang in the 90th minute. In the 2023 season, he recorded twelve appearances, including nine in the league and three in the AFC Champions League.

Between June and September 2024, Liu Haofan gained more consistent playing time, making appearances in all matches in that period. On 29 September 2024, Liu Haofan received heart surgery due to discomfort from the area, which had him ruled out for the rest of the season. In an interview from two months after, Liu Haofan claimed that the first instance where he had felt discomfort was two or three years before, and that his recovery was on track.

== International career ==
In February 2023, Liu Haofan was selected for the China squad to compete in the 2023 AFC U-20 Asian Cup. On 3 March, in China's first group stage match against Japan, Liu Haofan's header caused an own goal by Hayato Tanaka to take the lead; China eventually lost the game 2–1.

On 5 April 2024, he was selected for China's squad in the 2024 AFC U-23 Asian Cup.

On 28 February 2025, Liu Haofan earned his first call-up to the China national team, in preparation for two 2026 FIFA World Cup qualifier games against Saudi Arabia and Australia.

== Career statistics ==
=== Club ===
As of 31 October 2025

Appearances and goals by club, season, and competition
Club	Season	League			Cup		Continental		Other		Total	
Club	Season	Division	Apps	Goals	Apps	Goals	Apps	Goals	Apps	Goals	Apps	Goals
Zhejiang FC	2022	Chinese Super League	7	0	3	0	–		–		10	0
Zhejiang FC	2023	Chinese Super League	9	0	0	0	3 (Note: Appearances in AFC Champions League)	0	–		12	0
Zhejiang FC	2024	Chinese Super League	11	0	2	0	1 (Note: Appearances in AFC Champions League Two)	0	–		14	0
Zhejiang FC	2025	Chinese Super League	27	0	2	1	–		–		29	1
Zhejiang FC	Total		54	0	7	1	4	0	0	0	65	1
Career total			54	0	7	1	4	0	0	0	65	1

=== International ===
As of 12 July 2025

Appearances and goals by national team and year
National team	Year	Apps	Goals
China	2025	1	0
China	2026	6	0
Total		7	0

== Honours ==
China U23

- AFC U-23 Asian Cup runner-up: 2026
