= Du Yuezheng =

Chinese footballer (born 2005)

Du Yuezheng 杜月徵
Personal information
- Full name: Du Yuezheng
- Date of birth: 14 September 2005 (age 21)
- Place of birth: Datong, Shanxi, China
- Height: 1.85 m (6 ft 1 in)
- Position: Forward

Team information
- Current team: Chongqing Tonglianglong (on loan from Marbella)
- Number: 19

Youth career
- 2021-2022: Shenzhen FC

Senior career*
Years	Team	Apps	(Gls)
2022–2023	Shenzhen FC	40	(0)
2024–	Marbella	22	(3)
2026–	→ Chongqing Tonglianglong (loan)	28	(2)

International career^{‡}
2023–	China U23	9	(2)
2024–2025	China U20	8	(1)
2026–	China	1	(0)
- * Club domestic league appearances and goals as of 19 November 2026 ‡ National team caps and goals as of 24 September 2026

Du Yuezheng (Chinese: 杜月徵; born 14 September 2005) is a Chinese footballer who plays as a forward for Chinese Super League club Chongqing Tonglianglong on loan from Marbella, and the China national team.

== Club career ==
Du played for Shenzhen FC's youth team and participated in the 2021 Origin Cup, where Shenzhen won the tournament and Du personally won the best player award.

Du was promoted to the senior team during the 2022 season. He made his professional debut on 4 June 2022 in a 2–0 win against Chengdu Rongcheng, coming on as a late substitute for Gao Lin.

On 9 February 2026, Du was loaned to Chinese Super League club Chongqing Tonglianglong.

== International career ==
On 24 September 2026, Du made his debut for the senior China national team in a friendly against the Maldives.

== Career statistics ==
As of 31 December 2022

Appearances and goals by club, season and competition
Club	Season	League			Cup		Continental		Other		Total	
Club	Season	Division	Apps	Goals	Apps	Goals	Apps	Goals	Apps	Goals	Apps	Goals
Shenzhen FC	2022	Chinese Super League	14	0	1	0	—		—		15	0
Career total			14	0	1	0	0	0	0	0	15	0
