= Antonio Puche =

Spanish footballer and manager

Puche II
Personal information
- Full name: Antonio Puche Vicente
- Date of birth: 2 August 1972 (age 54)
- Place of birth: Yecla, Spain
- Height: 1.75 m (5 ft 9 in)
- Position: Forward

Team information
- Current team: China U23 (head coach)

Youth career
- 1981–1987: Yeclano
- 1987–1988: Elche

Senior career*
| Years | Team | Apps | (Gls) |
| 1988–1990 | Ilicitano | | |
| 1988–1992 | Elche | 35 | (5) |
| 1992–1993 | Valencia B | 17 | (5) |
| 1993–1995 | Palamós | 61 | (27) |
| 1995–1996 | Villarreal | 18 | (3) |
| 1996–1997 | Toledo | 15 | (1) |
| 1997–1998 | Jaén | 31 | (5) |
| 1998–1999 | Granada | 22 | (7) |
| 1999 | Palamós | 4 | (2) |
| 1999–2000 | Novelda | 14 | (2) |
| 2000–2001 | Pájara Playas | 16 | (0) |
| 2002–2003 | Frutas de Abarán | | |
| 2003–2004 | Linares | | |
| Total | | 233 | (57) |

International career
| 1988–1989 | Spain U16 | 12 | (6) |
| 1990 | Spain U20 | 1 | (0) |

Managerial career
- 2004–2005: Córdoba (youth)
- 2007–2008: Xerez B
- 2008–2009: Hércules (assistant)
- 2009: Racing Santander (assistant)
- 2010–2011: Tenerife (assistant)
- 2011–2012: Hércules (assistant)
- 2013: Al-Yarmouk (assistant)
- 2014–2015: Al Qadsia
- 2016: Anorthosis
- 2017: Saint-Étienne (assistant)
- 2018–2019: Olympiacos (assistant)
- 2022–2023: China U20
- 2023: Oriente Petrolero
- 2024–: China U23
Medal record
Men's football
Representing China (as manager)
AFC U-23 Asian Cup
| Silver medal – second place | 2026 Saudi Arabia | Team |
Asian Games
| Bronze medal – third place | 2026 Aichi–Nagoya | Team |
- * Club domestic league appearances and goals

Antonio Puche Vicente (born 2 August 1972), sometimes known as Puche II, is a Spanish former footballer who played as a forward, and a current manager.

== Club career ==
Born in Yecla, Region of Murcia, Puche began his senior career with Elche CF, being almost exclusively associated with the reserves during his spell. He made his first-team debut at only 16, playing eight minutes in a 1–1 La Liga away draw against CA Osasuna; legendary László Kubala handed him his first opportunity with the professionals.

In the summer of 1993, after a spell with Valencia CF's reserves, Puche joined Palamós CF of Segunda División. He had a breakthrough year in his second season, scoring 21 goals to lead all players but being relegated due to the Catalan club's financial problems; on 9 April 1995, he netted six past CD Leganés – also eventually relegated – in a 7–1 home rout.

Puche continued competing in the second level in the following campaigns, with Villarreal CF, CD Toledo and Real Jaén. He retired in June 2004 at nearly 32 years of age, after several years in the lower leagues.

From 2005 to 2007, Puche worked as director of football at Cádiz CF. The following year he had his first senior experience in head coaching, with Tercera División's Xerez CD B, as well as also sharing directorial duties in the first team with former club player Antonio Poyatos.

In 2008–09, Puche was appointed assistant coach of Juan Carlos Mandiá at second-tier side Hércules CF. In the following years, the pair continued to work together.

Puche signed with Kuwaiti Premier League's Qadsia SC in 2014. He was dismissed on 23 March of the following year, as the team went on to finish in fourth place.

== International career ==
Puche posted good scoring numbers with the Spain under-16 team. In an international tournament held in Genoa, he was named as best player.

Puche also played at under-20 level, being selected for the squad that appeared at the 1989 FIFA World Youth Championship held in Saudi Arabia.

== Personal life ==
Puche's older, brother, José (1968), was also a footballer. A midfielder, he coincided with his sibling at Elche and Palamós, and the pair was known as Puche I and Puche II.

== Honours ==
=== Individual ===
- Pichichi Trophy (Segunda División): 1994–95

=== Manager ===
Al Qadsia

- AFC Cup: 2014
- Kuwait Super Cup: 2014

China U23

- AFC U-23 Asian Cup: 2026 (Runners-up)
- Asian Games: 2026 (Bronze Medal)
