= Ri Il-song =

North Korean footballer

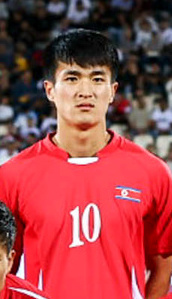

Personal information
- Date of birth: 14 January 2004 (age 22)
- Place of birth: Ŭndŏk County, North Korea
- Height: 1.78 m (5 ft 10 in)
- Position: Forward

Team information
- Current team: Ryomyong

Youth career
- April 25

Senior career*
Years	Team	Apps	(Gls)
–2021	April 25		
2021–	Ryomyong		

International career^{‡}
2019	North Korea U16	3	(5)
2023–	North Korea U23	8	(1)
2023–	North Korea	13	(4)
- * Club domestic league appearances and goals as of 17:04, 1 February 2022 (UTC) ‡ National team caps and goals as of 31 March 2026

- Ri Il-song
- Hangul: 리일성
- RR: Ri Ilseong
- MR: Ri Ilsŏng

Ri Il-song (Korean: 리일성; born 14 January 2004) is a North Korean professional footballer who plays as a forward for Ryomyong and the North Korea national team.

== Career ==
Ri first rose to prominence after scoring two goals for the April 25 under-15 team in a 3–1 win over the South Korean Gangwon Province representative team.

A fast-paced winger, he made his first mark on the international stage at qualification for the 2020 AFC U-16 Championship, scoring five goals in only three appearances, including a hat-trick in a resounding 16–0 win over Guam.

Before the effects of the COVID-19 pandemic in North Korea, Ri had planned to move to Spain to pursue a career in professional football. However, by the time English newspaper The Guardian had named him as one of the 60 best young players in the world in October 2021, Ri had not played football at all in over a year.

In March 2024, the Japanese newspaper Choson Sinbo revealed that Ri had transferred to DPRK Premier League fellow Ryomyong.

On 11 June 2024, he scored his first senior international goal for North Korea in a 4–1 victory over Myanmar, contributing to his nation's qualification to the 2027 AFC Asian Cup and 2026 FIFA World Cup qualification third round.

== Career statistics ==
=== International goals ===
No.	Date	Venue	Opponent	Score	Result	Competition
1.	11 June 2024	New Laos National Stadium, Vientiane, Laos	Myanmar	1–0	4–1	2026 FIFA World Cup qualification
2.	10 September 2024	New Laos National Stadium, Vientiane, Laos	Qatar	1–0	2–2	2026 FIFA World Cup qualification
3.	17 February 2025	Titanic Deluxe Belek Football Center, Serik, Turkey	Kazakhstan	1–0	2–0	Friendly
4.	17 February 2025	Titanic Deluxe Belek Football Center, Serik, Turkey	Kazakhstan	2–0	2–0	Friendly
