= Kariya-City General Athletic Park =

Park and sports complex in Kariya, Japan

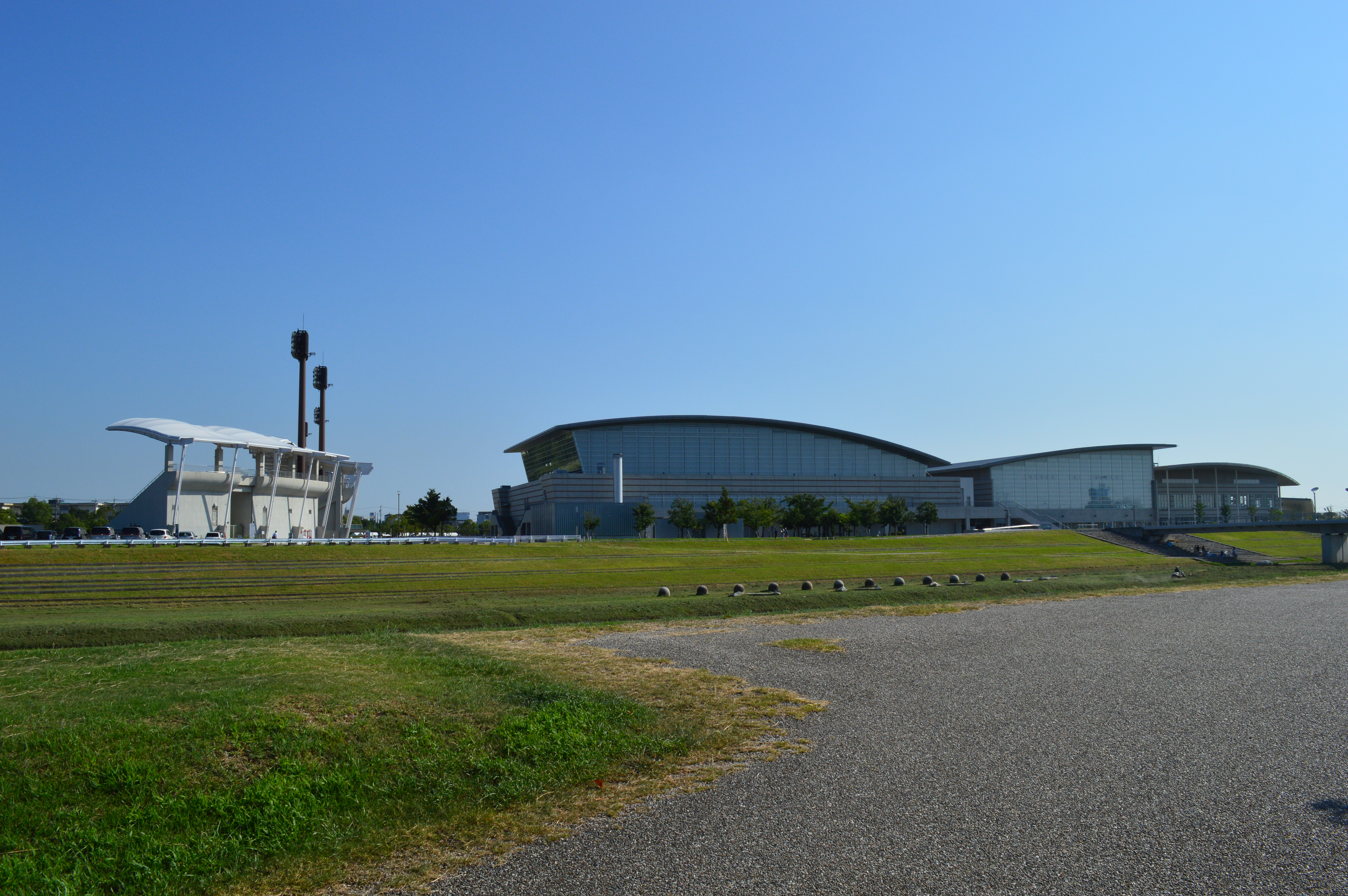
- Stadium (left) and indoor arena (right)
- Interactive map of Kariya-City General Athletic Park
- Full name: Kariya-City General Athletic Park
- Address: Arata, Tsuijichō; Kariya, Aichi; Japan
- Operator: Kariya Mirai Sports Partners
- Type: Sports complex
- Acreage: 18.4 hectares (45 acres)
- Parking: 1,237 slots

Construction
- Opened: 1 October 1994
- Expanded: 1999, 2007

Tenant
- 2026 Asian Games

Website
- wing-kariya.jp

The Kariya-City General Athletic Park (刈谷市総合運動公園, Kariya-shi Sōgō Undō Kōen) is an urban park and sports complex in Kariya, Aichi Prefecture, Japan.

== History ==
The site of what would become Kariya-City General Athletic Park was designated for development as an urban park on 15 February 1989. Construction followed, and the park opened on 1 October 1994. A football ground had already opened at the site in October 1993. It was subsequently renovated and converted into a JAAF Class 3 certified all-weather athletics stadium, with a 400-metre track, in 1999. The facility was later named Wave Stadium Kariya. An indoor arena was added to the park with the opening of the Wing Arena Kariya in January 2007. The Green Ground Kariya pitches were also developed within the same year.

Kariya City later conducted a public recruitment for a designated manager for the park in fiscal year 2006. Following approval by the Kariya City Council, Kariya Mirai Sports Partners was designated as the park's manager. The consortium began managing and operating the complex on 1 April 2012.

The Kariya Wave Stadium will host select men's and women's football games of the 2026 Asian Games.

== Facilities ==
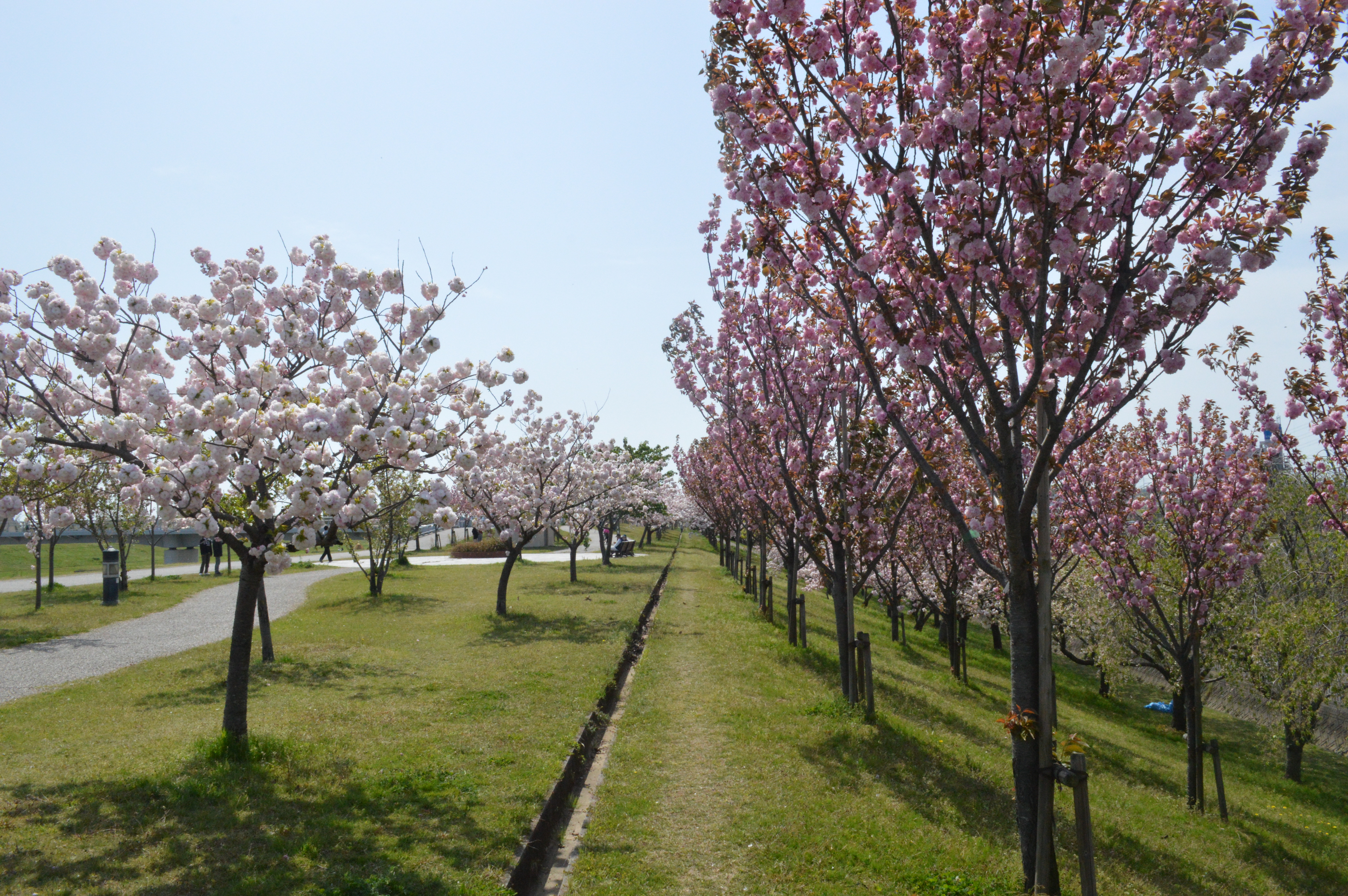
Cherry blossom trees at the park.

The Kariya-City General Athletic Park covers an area of 18.4 hectares (45 acres) and is located primarily in Arata, Tsuijichō. The complex comprises three principal sports facilities: Wave Stadium Kariya, an outdoor athletics stadium; Wing Arena Kariya, an indoor sports arena; and Green Ground Kariya, a football facility. The park also has a large playground, outdoor exercise facilities, and a walking course, centered around its open lawn areas.

=== Sports venues ===
The Wave Stadium Kariya is the athletics stadium with a 2,602 seating capacity (inclusive of 16 wheelchair spaces) and an additional lawn stand area which can accommodate additional 1,400 people. It has a 400-metre (1,300 ft), eight-lane all-weather track and a natural grass pitch the can accommodate outdoor sports like football and rugby.

The Wing Arena Kariya is housed in a two-story building with a footprint of 10,430 square metres (112,300 sq ft) and a total floor area of 14,570 square metres (156,800 sq ft). The main arena has 2,376 seats, comprising 800 retractable seats on the first floor and 1,576 fixed seats on the second floor. The sub-arena has an additional 148 seats.

The Green Ground Kariya is a two-pitch football facility, comprising one natural-grass pitch and one artificial-turf pitch.

Venue	Image	Purpose	Seating capacity	Opened	Notes
Wave Stadium Kariya (ウェーブスタジアム刈谷, Wēbu Sutajiamu Kariya)		Stadium	2,602	1993 (football ground); 1999 (stadium)	
Wing Arena Kariya (ウィングアリーナ刈谷, Uingu Arīna Kariya)		Indoor arena	2,376 (main); 148 (sub-arena)	2007	Main arena capacity inclusive of 800 retractable seats
Green Ground Kariya (グリーングラウンド刈谷, Gurīn Guraundo Kariya)		Football pitches	—N/a	2007	One natural grass pitch, One artificial grass pitch
