= Xi'an International Football Center =

Football stadium in Xi'an, China

- 西安国际足球中心
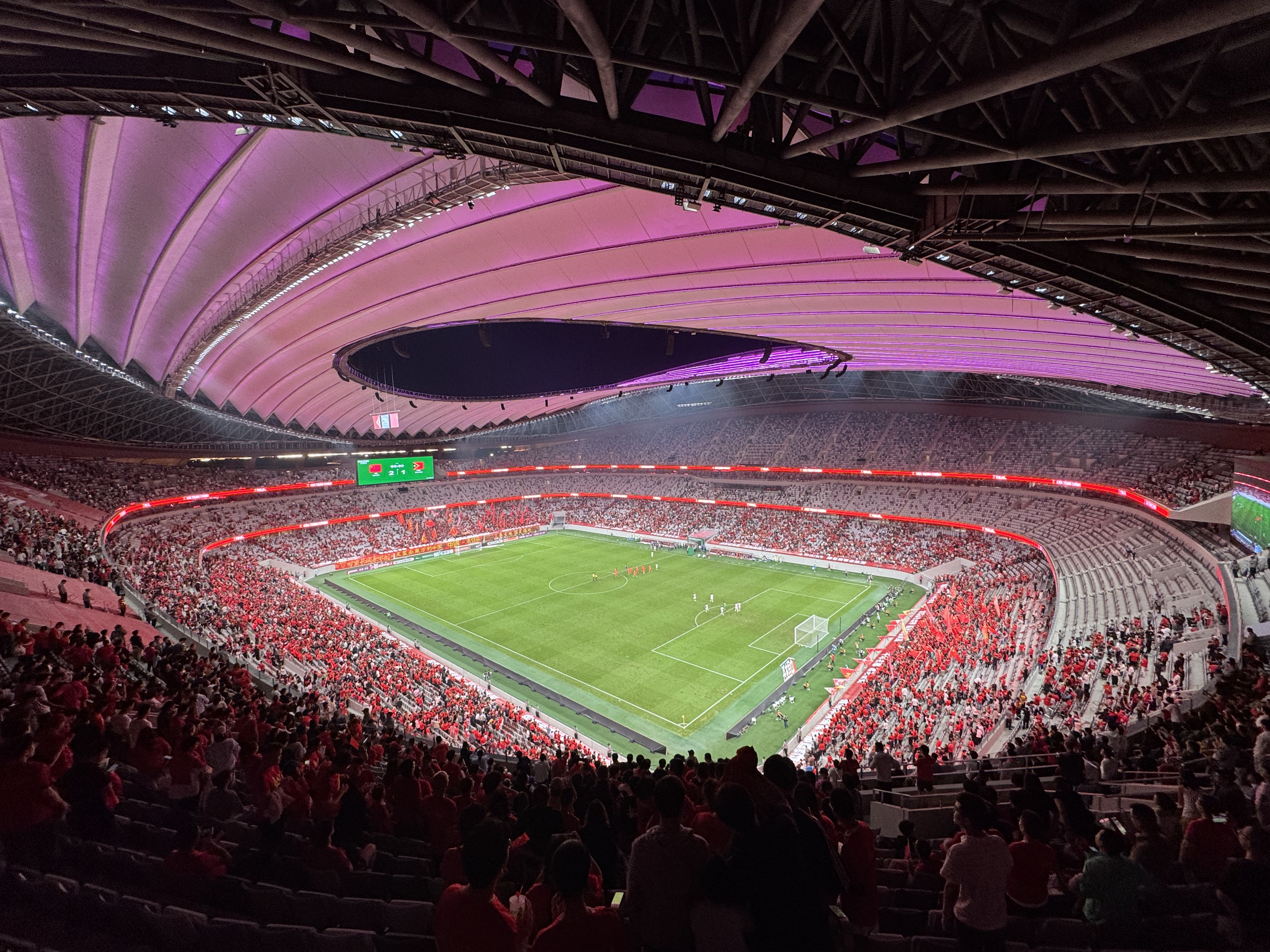
- Interactive map of Xi'an International Football Center
- Location: Fengdong New Town, Chang'an District, Xi'an, Shaanxi, China
- Coordinates: 34°17′00″N 108°46′08″E
- Capacity: 60,235
- Record attendance: 43,937
- Public transit: 16 at Xi'anguojizuqiuzhongxin

Construction
- Groundbreaking: 2020
- Built: 2020–2023
- Opened: September 3, 2025
- Cost: ¥2.5 billion
- Architect: Zaha Hadid Architects
- General contractor: Shaanxi Construction Engineering Group Corporation

Tenant
- Shaanxi Union (2026-present)

The Xi'an International Football Center, also known as the Fengdong Stadium, is a football stadium located in Xi'an, Shaanxi, China. It is the home of China League One club Shaanxi Union. The stadium has a seating capacity of 60,235 spectators.

== Construction ==
The Xi'an International Football Center was initially planned as a venue for the 2023 AFC Asian Cup, which China was selected as the host for, but later pulled out. Construction started in 2020 and was completed in 2025.

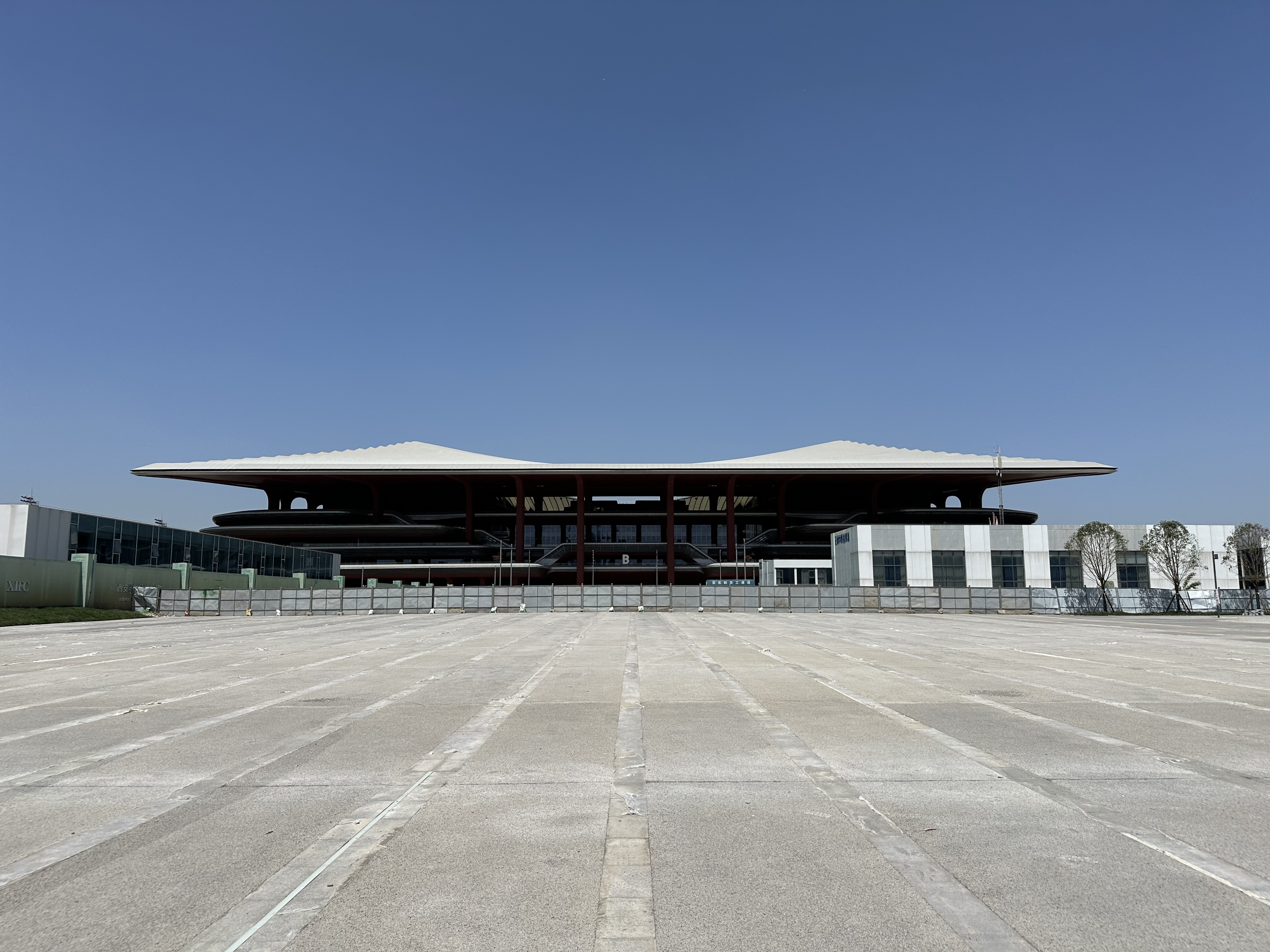
Xi'an International Football Center (Under Construction), 25 April 2024

== Major matches ==
On 3 September 2025, the Xi'an International Football Center held its first official match. In the first round of Group D of the 2026 AFC U-23 Asian Cup Qualifiers, China won 2-1 against Timor-Leste.

The 2026 Team China Xi'an International Youth Football Tournament was held at the Xi'an International Football Center from 25 to 31 March 2026. The China U-23 national team played three home matches against North Korea, Thailand, and Vietnam.
