= Li Xinxiang =

Chinese footballer (born 2005)

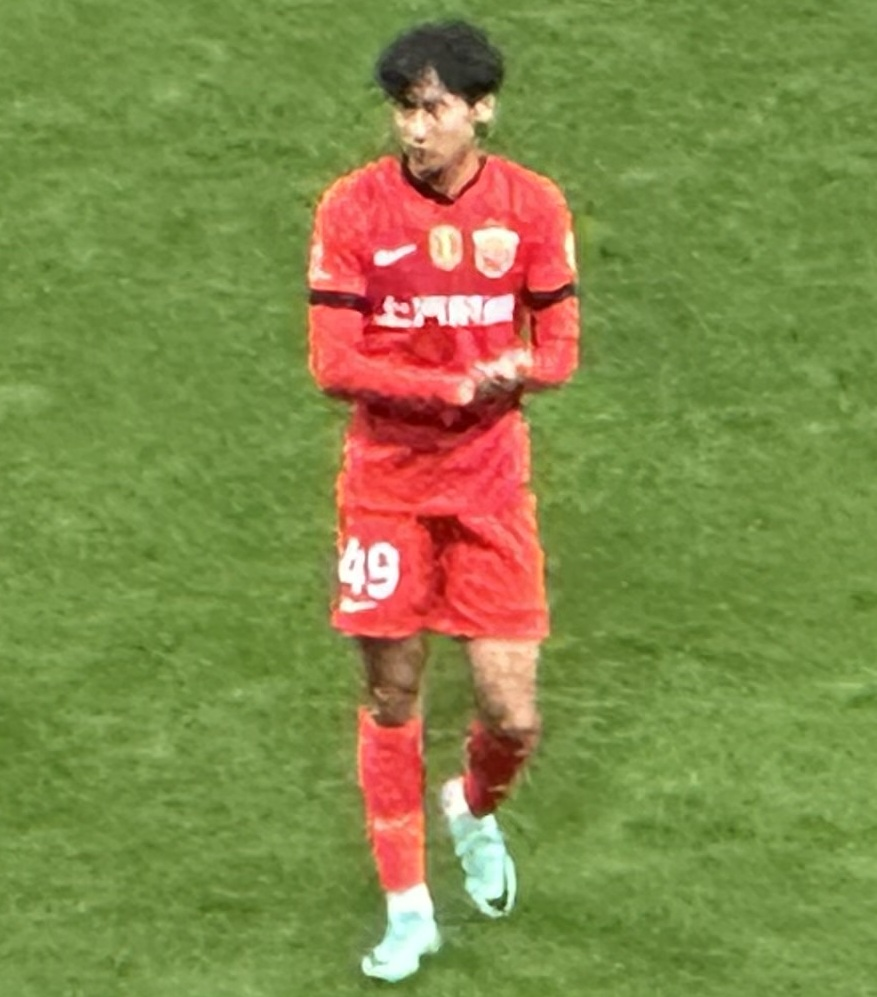
- Li Xinxiang in May 2025

Personal information
- Full name: Li Xinxiang
- Date of birth: 30 November 2005 (age 20)
- Place of birth: Huoqiu County, Anhui, China
- Height: 1.80 m (5 ft 11 in)
- Position: Winger

Team information
- Current team: Shanghai Port
- Number: 49

Youth career
- –2023: Shanghai Port

Senior career*
Years	Team	Apps	(Gls)
2024	Shanghai Port B (res.)	22	(5)
2025–	Shanghai Port	49	(11)

International career^{‡}
2025–	China U22	2	(1)
Medal record
Representing China
Asian Games
Bronze medal – third place	2026 Aichi–Nagoya	Team
- * Club domestic league appearances and goals as of 19 November 2026 ‡ National team caps and goals as of 22 November 2025

Li Xinxiang (Chinese: 李新翔; pinyin: Lǐ Xīnxiáng; born 30 November 2005) is a Chinese professional footballer who plays as a winger for Chinese Super League club Shanghai Port.

== Club career ==
=== Shanghai Port ===
==== 2024 ====
In 2024, Li Xinxiang followed Shanghai Port B to compete in the 2024 China League Two. He made his professional debut on 24 March 2024, in a 2–1 away loss to Jiangxi Dark Horse Junior. On 5 April 2024, he scored his first goal for Shanghai Port B, in a 2–0 home win over Shenzhen Juniors. On 25 May 2024, Li Xinxiang provided a goal and an assist in a 6–1 home win against Haikou Mingcheng. On 29 September 2024, Li Xinxiang scored a double in an away league match against Nantong Haimen Codion, with the match finishing 2–1 for Shanghai Port B. For his performance in that match, he was given the player of the round award. Li Xinxiang finished the season with five goals in twenty-one appearances.

==== 2025 ====
On 21 February 2025, Shanghai Port announced that Li Xinxiang would be registered for their 2025 Chinese Super League campaign. On 11 March 2025, he made his first-team debut for Shanghai Port, coming on as a 77th minute substitute for Mateus Vital in the second leg of the 2024–25 AFC Champions League Elite round of 16, in a 4–1 away loss to Japanese side Yokohama F. Marinos. In addition to the first-team, Li Xinxiang continued to play for Shanghai Port B. On 22 March 2025, he provided an assist for Liao Chongjiu in a 2–1 win over Tai'an Tiankuang in a 2025 China League Two match. On 28 March 2025, on his Chinese Super League debut, Li Xinxiang scored a goal and provided two assists in a 3–3 away draw with Qingdao West Coast, becoming the first player born in 2005 to score in the Chinese Super League, aged 19 years and 118 days. With his performance, he also become the youngest ever player to provide a goal and an assist in a Chinese Super League match since 2012, and became the second youngest player to score a goal for Shanghai Port in the Chinese Super League, behind only Li Deming.

On 18 June, he scored Shanghai Port's opener in a 3–1 away league victory at Henan. A week later on 26 June, he scored a goal and provided an assist for Gustavo in a 3–0 home win against Dalian Yingbo. He then scored his fourth goal of the season in the following match on 30 June, equalising the game in an eventual 2–1 away win against Shenzhen Peng City.

== International career ==
In July 2023, Li Xinxiang was selected as part of a China U18 training camp.

== Career statistics ==
=== Club ===
As of 25 November 2025

Appearances and goals by club, season, and competition
Club	Season	League			Cup		Continental		Other		Total	
Club	Season	Division	Apps	Goals	Apps	Goals	Apps	Goals	Apps	Goals	Apps	Goals
Shanghai Port B	2024	China League Two	21	5	–		–		–		21	5
Shanghai Port B	2025	China League Two	1	0	–		–		–		1	0
Shanghai Port B	Total		22	5	0	0	0	0	0	0	22	5
Shanghai Port	2025	Chinese Super League	23	6	2	0	3 (Note: Appearances in AFC Champions League Elite)	0	0 (Note: Appearances in Chinese FA Super Cup)	0	28	6
Career total			45	11	2	0	3	0	0	0	50	11

== Honours ==
Shanghai Port

- Chinese Super League: 2025
