= Xiang Yuwang =

Chinese footballer (born 2003)

Personal information
- Full name: Xiang Yuwang
- Date of birth: 18 December 2003 (age 22)
- Place of birth: Pengshui County, Chongqing, China
- Height: 1.77 m (5 ft 10 in)
- Position: Second striker

Team information
- Current team: Chongqing Tonglianglong
- Number: 7

Youth career
- –2022: Chongqing Furen High School
- 2022: Chongqing Youth

Senior career*
| Years | Team | Apps | (Gls) |
| 2022– | Chongqing Tonglianglong | 117 | (56) |

International career^{‡}
| 2023–2026 | China U23 | 21 | (5) |
Medal record
Representing China
AFC U-23 Asian Cup
| Runner-up | 2026 Saudi Arabia | Team |
Asian Games
| Bronze medal – third place | 2026 Aichi–Nagoya | Team |
- * Club domestic league appearances and goals as of 8 November 2026 ‡ National team caps and goals as of 28 March 2026

Xiang Yuwang (Chinese: 向余望; pinyin: Xiàng Yúwàng; born 18 December 2003) is a Chinese professional footballer who plays as a second striker for Chinese Super League club Chongqing Tonglianglong.

== Club career ==
=== Early career ===
Born in Pengshui Miao and Tujia Autonomous County, Chongqing, Xiang started his career at Chongqing Furen High School, an affiliate to Beijing Renhe, where Xiang had taken part in Chongqing's various youth leagues representing the high school.

In 2021, Xiang captained the Chongqing U18s for the 2021 National Games of China, where Xiang's Chongqing finished second place, losing to Shaanxi U18s on penalties.

=== Chongqing Tonglianglong ===
In January 2022, Xiang was part of a Chongqing Tonglianglong side that entered the 2021 Chongqing Amateur Super League. They became the league champions of that year, and were promoted to the 2022 CMCL, the Chinese fourth-tier.

Xiang was named captain for Chongqing Tonglianglong's 2022 season in the CMCL and led out the club's first league match. Having made 12 appearances and scored 11 times during the season, Xiang's Chongqing Tonglianglong were promoted to China League Two as Chongqing finished as runners-up.

Upon their promotion to China League Two, Xiang's side become high-flyers as Chongqing Tonglianglong finished top of the League Two South Group undefeated to enter the promotion stage of the competition, with Xiang grabbing 9 goals and 7 assists in the season to take the club to China League One as eventual champions of the division. In the CFA Cup, Xiang Yuwang scored 5 goals in 5 matches as he took Chongqing Tonglianglong to the quarter-finals of the competition where they were eliminated.

In the 2024 season, Xiang scored in six consecutive league matches, spanning between 21 April 2024 against Foshan Nanshi and 2 June 2024 against Shijiazhuang Gongfu.

== International career ==
On 11 August 2017, Xiang was called up to a China U14 national team to participate in the CCFC Cup 2017, a friendly competition.

On 12 January 2021, Xiang was called up to a China U18 training camp to prepare for 2023 AFC U-20 Asian Cup qualification matches.

On 30 November 2023, Xiang was called up to a China U23 training camp to prepare for the 2024 AFC U-23 Asian Cup and qualification to the 2024 Summer Olympics.

== Career statistics ==
=== Club ===
As of 8 November 2026

Appearances and goals by club, season, and competition
| Club | Season | League | | | Cup | | Continental | | Other | | Total | |
| Club | Season | Division | Apps | Goals | Apps | Goals | Apps | Goals | Apps | Goals | Apps | Goals |
|---|---|---|---|---|---|---|---|---|---|---|---|---|
| Chongqing Tonglianglong | 2022 | CMCL | 12 | 11 | – | | – | | – | | 12 | 11 |
| Chongqing Tonglianglong | 2023 | China League Two | 22 | 9 | 5 | 5 | – | | – | | 27 | 14 |
| Chongqing Tonglianglong | 2024 | China League One | 27 | 15 | 2 | 1 | – | | – | | 29 | 16 |
| Chongqing Tonglianglong | 2025 | China League One | 29 | 18 | 2 | 0 | – | | – | | 31 | 18 |
| Chongqing Tonglianglong | 2026 | Chinese Super League | 27 | 3 | 3 | 2 | – | | – | | 30 | 5 |
| Chongqing Tonglianglong | Total | | 117 | 56 | 12 | 8 | 0 | 0 | 0 | 0 | 129 | 64 |
| Career total | | | 117 | 56 | 12 | 8 | 0 | 0 | 0 | 0 | 129 | 64 |

== Honours ==
Chongqing Tonglianglong

- China League Two: 2023
- Chongqing Amateur Super League: 2021

China U23

- AFC U-23 Asian Cup runner-up:2026

Individual

- China League One Chinese Player of the Year: 2024
- China League Two Young Player of the Year: 2023
- China League Two Best 11 of the Year: 2023
- China League Two Bronze Boot: 2023
- China League Two top assists provider: 2023
- China League Two Young Player of the Month: April/May 2023, June 2023, July 2023, August 2023, September 2023
- Chinese Champions League Team of the Season: 2022
- Chinese Champions League Bronze Boot: 2022
