= 2028 AFC U-23 Asian Cup =

International football competition

2028年AFC U23アジアカップ

Tournament details
- Host country: Japan
- Dates: 4–22 January 2028
- Teams: 16 (from 1 confederation)

The 2028 AFC U-23 Asian Cup is the upcoming 8th edition of the AFC U-23 Asian Cup, the biennial international youth football championship organised by the Asian Football Confederation (AFC) for the men's under-23 national teams of Asia. A total of 16 teams played in the final tournament. Players born on or after 1 January 2005 are eligible to participate.

The tournament will be played 4–22 January 2028 in Japan, who secured the hosting rights on 29 July 2026.

Sixteen teams will compete in the tournament, which will also act as the qualifiers to determine the two Asian representatives to the 2028 Summer Olympics in the United States.

== Host selection ==
Following a competitive bidding process, Japan was selected as the host for this competition by the Asian Football Confederation Competitions Committee on 30 July 2026. Other submissions included: Jordan, Kyrgyzstan, Qatar, and Uzbekistan as well as the United Arab Emirates, who subsequently withdrew. This will be the first time that Japan hosts the competition.

== Qualification ==
Qualification matches will be played 7–15 June 2027.

=== Qualified teams ===
The following teams qualified for the 2028 AFC U-23 Asian Cup.

Team	Qualification method	Date of qualification	Total appearances (Note: Total appearances including 2028)	Most recent appearance	Previous best performance
Japan	Hosts	29 July 2026	7	2026	Champions (2016, 2024, 2026)

== Draw ==
The draw will take place in Kuala Lumpur, Malaysia in 2027.

The 16 teams will be placed into four groups of four teams, with seeding based on their performance in the previous three editions of the tournament (2022, 2024, and 2026). As hosts, Japan are ranked as the top seeded team.

Pot 1	Pot 2	Pot 3	Pot 4
1. Japan (hosts)			

== Squads ==
Players born on or after 1 January 2005 are eligible to compete in the tournament. Each team will register a squad of 18 to 23 players, including a minimum of three goalkeepers (Regulations Article 26.3).

== Broadcasting rights ==
Territory	Rights holder	Ref.
Japan	DAZN	
United States	CBS SPORTS	
India	FanCode	
Thailand	BG SPORTS	
Vietnam	TV360	

== See also ==
- 2028 AFC Women's Olympic Qualifying Tournament
