= Uzbekistan at the 2026 Asian Games =

Sporting event delegation

- IOC code: UZB
- NOC: National Olympic Committee of the Republic of Uzbekistan

in Nagoya, Japan 19 September 2026 – 4 October 2026
- Competitors: 397 in 38 sports
- Flag bearers: Guliston Perdeboyeva; Turabek Khabibullaev
- Medals Ranked 5th: Gold 21 Silver 25 Bronze 24 Total 70

Asian Games appearances (overview)
- 1994; 1998; 2002; 2006; 2010; 2014; 2018; 2022; 2026

Uzbekistan competed at the 2026 Asian Games. The games were held in Nagoya. The event was held from 19 September to 4 October 2026.

== Medalists ==
20th Asian Games - Uzbekistan national U23 football team

The following Uzbekistan competitors won medals at the Games.

Medals by sport
| Sport | 1st place, gold medalist(s) | 2nd place, silver medalist(s) | 3rd place, bronze medalist(s) | Total |
| Athletics | 3 | 0 | 1 | 4 |
| Canoeing | 2 | 6 | 1 | 9 |
| Esports | 0 | 0 | 1 | 1 |
| Fencing | 0 | 1 | 2 | 3 |
| Gymnastics | 1 | 0 | 1 | 2 |
| Karate | 1 | 1 | 0 | 2 |
| Kurash | 4 | 0 | 2 | 6 |
| Mixed martial arts | 0 | 2 | 1 | 3 |
| Rowing | 1 | 6 | 2 | 9 |
| Shooting | 1 | 0 | 0 | 1 |
| Weightlifting | 1 | 0 | 0 | 1 |
| Wushu | 0 | 1 | 2 | 3 |

Medals by day
| Day | Date | 1st place, gold medalist(s) | 2nd place, silver medalist(s) | 3rd place, bronze medalist(s) | Total |
| 1 | September 20 | 0 | 1 | 0 | 1 |
| 2 | September 21 | 1 | 0 | 0 | 1 |
| 3 | September 22 | 0 | 3 | 1 | 4 |
| 4 | September 23 | 0 | 0 | 2 | 2 |
| 5 | September 24 | 5 | 8 | 5 | 18 |
| 6 | September 25 | 1 | 3 | 1 | 5 |
| 7 | September 26 | 1 | 2 | 0 | 3 |
| 8 | September 27 | 2 | 0 | 3 | 5 |
| 9 | September 28 | 2 | 0 | 1 | 3 |
| 10 | September 29 | 2 | 0 | 0 | 2 |

| Medal | Name | Sport | Event | Date |
|---|---|---|---|---|
| Gold | Abdul Vakhkhob Rashidov | Karate | Men's 67 kg | 21 Sep |
| Gold | Utkirbek Juraev | Gymnastics | Men's pommel horse | 24 Sep |
| Gold | Sharifa Davronova | Athletics | Women's triple jump | 24 Sep |
| Gold | Shokhsanam Sherzodova | Canoeing | Women's C-1 200 metres | 24 Sep |
| Gold | Vladimir Svechnikov | Shooting | Men's 10 m air pistol | 24 Sep |
| Gold | Shakhzod Nurmatov; Sobirjon Safaroliyev | Rowing | Men's Lightweight double sculls | 24 Sep |
| Gold | Sukhrob Khodjaev | Athletics | Men's hammer throw | 25 Sep |
| Gold | Shakhriyor Makhkamov | Canoeing | Men's K-1 500 metres | 26 Sep |
| Gold | Shokhrukhkhon Bakhtiyorov | Kurash | Men's +90 kg | 27 Sep |
| Gold | Ibodatkhon Agojonova | Kurash | Women's 57 kg | 27 Sep |
| Gold | Akxror Ziyodullaev | Kurash | Men's 81 kg | 28 Sep |
| Gold | Pokizakhon Kamoldinova | Kurash | Women's 78 kg | 28 Sep |
| Gold | Barnokhon Sayfullaeva | Athletics | Women's high jump | 29 Sep |
| Gold | Akbar Djuraev | Weightlifting | Men's 110 kg | 29 Sep |
| Silver | Khumoyunmirzo Khalimov | Karate | Men's 55 kg | 20 Sep |
| Silver | Darya Latisheva | Wushu | Nanquan & nandao | 22 Sep |
| Silver | Firdavs Atamuratov | Mixed martial arts | Men's modern 60 kg | 22 Sep |
| Silver | Khiola Sobirova | Mixed martial arts | Women's traditional 60 kg | 22 Sep |
| Silver | Artur Guliev; Vladlen Denisov | Canoeing | Men's C-2 500 metres | 24 Sep |
| Silver | Zaynab Dayibekova | Fencing | Women's Individual sabre | 24 Sep |
| Silver | Shakhboz Kholmurzaev | Rowing | Men's Single sculls | 24 Sep |
| Silver | Mekhrojbek Mamatkulov; Pavel Sorin | Rowing | Men's Double sculls | 24 Sep |
| Silver | Fazliddin Karimov; Dilshodjon Khudoyberdiev; Maksim Golubev; Alisher Turdiev | Rowing | Men's Coxless four | 24 Sep |
| Silver | Anna Prakaten | Rowing | Women's Single sculls | 24 Sep |
| Silver | Anna Aksenova; Aydana Smetullaeva | Rowing | Women's Coxless pair | 24 Sep |
| Silver | Rayhon Sattorova; Mariya Sergeeva; Anna Aksenova; Aydana Smetullaeva | Rowing | Women's Coxless four | 24 Sep |
| Silver | Vladlen Denisov | Canoeing | Men's C-1 500 metres | 25 Sep |
| Silver | Shokhsanam Sherzodova; Nilufar Zokirova | Canoeing | Women's C-2 500 metres | 25 Sep |
| Silver | Milana Dushev-Yanich; Ekaterina Shubina; Arina Tanatmisheva; Shakhrizoda Mavlonova | Canoeing | K-4 500 metres | 25 Sep |
| Silver | Vladlen Denisov; Nilufar Zokirova | Canoeing | C-2 500 metres | 26 Sep |
| Silver | Arina Tanatmisheva | Canoeing | K-1 500 metres | 26 Sep |
| Bronze | Nodirbek Shavkatov | Mixed martial arts | Men's modern 71 kg | 22 Sep |
| Bronze | Abubakir Iminjonov; Farrukh Mirkhamitov | Esports | eFootball | 23 Sep |
| Bronze | Polina Volobueva | Fencing | Women's Individual foil | 23 Sep |
| Bronze | Saydullo Abdurashitov | Wushu | Men's sanda 56 kg | 24 Sep |
| Bronze | Doniyor Turgunbaev | Wushu | Men's sanda 75 kg | 24 Sep |
| Bronze | Arina Tanatmisheva; Ekaterina Shubina | Canoeing | Women's K-2 500 metres | 24 Sep |
| Bronze | Shakhboz Kholmurzaev; Davron Davronov; Mekhrojbek Mamatkulov; Pavel Sorin | Rowing | Men's Quadruple sculls | 24 Sep |
| Bronze | Maksim Golubev; Alisher Turdiev | Rowing | Men's Coxless pair | 24 Sep |
| Bronze | Rasuljon Abdurakhimov | Gymnastics | Men's parallel bars | 25 Sep |
| Bronze | Anvar Anvarov | Athletics | Men's long jump | 27 Sep |
| Bronze | Zaynab Dayibekova; Fernanda Herrera; Gulistan Perdebaeva; Samira Shokirova | Fencing | Women's team sabre | 27 Sep |
| Bronze | Bekmurod Oltiboev | Kurash | Men's +90 kg | 27 Sep |
| Bronze | Shokhista Nazarova | Kurash | Women's 78 kg | 28 Sep |

== Competitors ==
The following is the list of the number of competitors participating at the Games per sport/discipline.

| Sport | Men | Women | Total |
|---|---|---|---|
| 3x3 basketball | 0 | 4 | 4 |
| Archery | 3 | 3 | 6 |
| Artistic swimming | 0 | 3 | 3 |
| Athletics | 13 | 8 | 21 |
| Beach volleyball | 2 | 0 | 2 |
| Boxing | 6 | 5 | 11 |
| Canoeing | 7 | 6 | 13 |
| Cycling | 5 | 7 | 12 |
| Diving | 4 | 0 | 4 |
| Equestrian | 4 | 1 | 5 |
| Esports | 12 | 0 | 12 |
| Fencing | 10 | 8 | 18 |
| Field hockey | 18 | 18 | 36 |
| Football | 23 | 22 | 45 |
| Golf | 3 | 0 | 3 |
| Gymnastics | 5 | 10 | 15 |
| Handball | 0 | 14 | 14 |
| Ju-jitsu | 4 | 0 | 4 |
| Judo | 7 | 9 | 16 |
| Karate | 3 | 3 | 6 |
| Kurash | 3 | 4 | 7 |
| Mixed martial arts | 3 | 1 | 4 |
| Modern pentathlon | 1 | 2 | 3 |
| Rowing | 12 | 5 | 17 |
| Rugby sevens | 13 | 0 | 13 |
| Sailing | 2 | 0 | 2 |
| Shooting | 10 | 2 | 12 |
| Squash | 2 | 2 | 4 |
| Swimming | 4 | 1 | 5 |
| Table tennis | 3 | 3 | 6 |
| Taekwondo | 4 | 3 | 7 |
| Tennis | 3 | 2 | 5 |
| Triathlon | 3 | 2 | 5 |
| Volleyball | 12 | 0 | 12 |
| Water polo | 0 | 15 | 15 |
| Weightlifting | 5 | 1 | 6 |
| Wrestling | 12 | 6 | 18 |
| Wushu | 6 | 3 | 9 |
| Total | 226 | 171 | 397 |

== 3x3 basketball ==
Summary

| Team | Event | Group Stage | | | | Quarterfinals | Semifinals | Final / BM | |
| Team | Event | Opposition Score | Opposition Score | Opposition Score | Rank | Opposition Score | Opposition Score | Opposition Score | Rank |
|---|---|---|---|---|---|---|---|---|---|
| Uzbekistan women's | Women's tournament | Iran; L 5–19 | Chinese Taipei; L 12–15 | Japan; L 11–19 | 4 | Did not advance | | | 13 |

=== Women's tournament ===
Preliminary Rounds – Group B

| Pos | Team | Pld | W | L | PF | PA | PD | Pts | Qualification |
|---|---|---|---|---|---|---|---|---|---|
| 1 | Iran | 3 | 3 | 0 | 51 | 31 | +20 | 6 | Quarterfinals |
| 2 | Chinese Taipei | 3 | 2 | 1 | 37 | 34 | +3 | 5 | Play-ins |
| 3 | Japan | 3 | 1 | 2 | 43 | 41 | +2 | 4 | Play-ins |
| 4 | Uzbekistan | 3 | 0 | 3 | 28 | 53 | −25 | 3 | |

Source: 2026 Asian Games

21 September
18:05

Report

| Iran | 19–5 | Uzbekistan |
| Pts: Abedi 8 | | Pts: Lapatnikova 2 |

Kinjō-futō Station Square, Nagoya
Referees: Li Caiyan (CHN), Liu Chee (MAS)

21 September
19:20

Report

| Chinese Taipei | 15–12 | Uzbekistan |
| Pts: Chang 7 | | Pts: Lapatnikova, Mambetnazarova 4 |

Kinjō-futō Station Square, Nagoya
Referees: Alexandr Rulyov (KAZ), Neoh Yuen (MAS)

23 September
14:05

Report

| Japan | 19–11 | Uzbekistan |
| Pts: Hirashita 7 | | Pts: Lapatnikova 5 |

Kinjō-futō Station Square, Nagoya
Referees: Chen Kuan-i (TPE), Neoh Yuen (MAS)

== Boxing ==
Guided by Tulqin Qilichev, Uzbekistan national team competed in the Asian Games boxing championships.

Men

| Athlete | Event | Round of 32 | Round of 16 | Quarterfinals | Semifinals | Final | Rank |
| Athlete | Event | Opposition Result | Opposition Result | Opposition Result | Opposition Result | Opposition Result | Rank |
|---|---|---|---|---|---|---|---|
| Samandar Olimov | 55 kg | Bye | Bokhunthod (THA); L 2–3 | Did not advance | | | |
| Abdumalik Khalokov | 60 kg | Bye | O T-b (PRK); W 5–0 | Ogayre (PHI); W 5–0 | Kitamoto (JPN) – | | |
| Shavkatjon Boltaev | 70 kg | Bye | Kim J-s (KOR); W 4–1 | Li G. (CHN) – | | | |
| Fazliddin Erkinboev | 80 kg | —N/a | Bye | Yazmin (SRI); W RSC-I | Panghal (IND) – | | |
| Turabek Khabibullaev | 90 kg | —N/a | Bye | Oralbay (KAZ) – | | | |
| Jakhongir Zokirov | +90 kg | —N/a | Bye | Abroridinov (TJK); W 5–0 | Esmaeili Vandaei (IRI) – | | |

Women

| Athlete | Event | Round of 32 | Round of 16 | Quarterfinals | Semifinals | Final | Rank |
| Athlete | Event | Opposition Result | Opposition Result | Opposition Result | Opposition Result | Opposition Result | Rank |
|---|---|---|---|---|---|---|---|
| Feruza Kazakova | 51 kg | Bye | Raksat (THA); W 5–0 | An K-b (PRK) – | | | |
| Nigita Uktamova | 54 kg | Bye | Kholova (TJK); W 5–0 | Chongprongklang (THA); L 2–3 | Did not advance | | |
| Sitora Turdibekova | 60 kg | —N/a | Hà T.L. (VIE); W 5–0 | Monkhor (MGL) – | | | |
| Navbakhor Khamidova | 65 kg | —N/a | Seon S-j (KOR); W 5–0 | Hooda (IND); L 0–5 | Did not advance | | |
| Aziza Zokirova | 75 kg | —N/a | | Bogdanova (KAZ) – | | | |

== Field hockey ==
Summary

Key:

- s.o. – Match decided by penalty-shootout.

| Team | Event | Group Stage | | | | | | Semi-final | Pl | |
| Team | Event | Opposition Result | Opposition Result | Opposition Result | Opposition Result | Opposition Result | Rank | Opposition Result | Opposition Result | Rank |
|---|---|---|---|---|---|---|---|---|---|---|
| Men's team | Men's | Malaysia; L 0–7 | Pakistan; L 1–5 | Oman; W 3–2 | China; L 1–3 | Thailand; L 1–3 | 5 | Did not advance | Sri Lanka; L 2–4 | 10 |
| Women's team | Women's team | India; L 0–19 | Thailand; L 1–3 | Japan; L 1–7 | Singapore; L 1–3 | Indonesia; W 2–1 | 6 | Did not advance | Kazakhstan; D 1–1 (2–4 s.o.) | 12 |

=== Men's tournament ===
Team squads

The following is the Uzbekistan roster in the men's field hockey tournament of the 2026 Asian Games.

Head Coach:

1. Davlat Tolibbaev (GK)
4. Islombek Mamajonov
5. Azizbek Ibrokhimov
7. Shavkatbek Mirzakarimov
9. Shokhrukhbek Salimjonov
10. Mukhammadkarim Aslanov
11. Ruzimukhammad Nazirov
12. Gaybullo Khaytboev (C)
14. Khakimboy Khakimov
15. Azamatkhon Abboskhonov
18. Fozilbek Husanov
19. Jamshidbek Komilov
20. Nodirbek Yuldashev
21. Gayratbek Ganiev (GK)
22. Bakhodirjon Abdurakhmonov
44. Asadbek Asliddinov
77. Fakhriddin Saydullaev
99. Doston Sotlikov

Preliminary round

| Pos | Team | Pld | W | D | L | GF | GA | GD | Pts | Qualification |
|---|---|---|---|---|---|---|---|---|---|---|
| 1 | Malaysia | 5 | 5 | 0 | 0 | 34 | 4 | +30 | 15 | Semi-finals |
| 2 | Pakistan | 5 | 4 | 0 | 1 | 28 | 8 | +20 | 12 | Semi-finals |
| 3 | China | 5 | 3 | 0 | 2 | 13 | 10 | +3 | 9 | Fifth place classification |
| 4 | Thailand | 5 | 2 | 0 | 3 | 5 | 28 | −23 | 6 | Fifth place classification |
| 5 | Uzbekistan | 5 | 1 | 0 | 4 | 6 | 20 | −14 | 3 | Ninth place game |
| 6 | Oman | 5 | 0 | 0 | 5 | 4 | 20 | −16 | 0 | Eleventh place game |

Source: FIH
Rules for classification: 1) points; 2) matches won; 3) goal difference; 4) goals for; 5) head-to-head result; 6) field goals for.

20 September 2026
13:00

| Malaysia | 7–0 | Uzbekistan |
|---|---|---|
| Sumantri 11'; Fa. Saari 15', 24', 43'; Kamaruddin 36'; Azrai 59'; Jali 60' | Report |

Gifu Prefectural Green Stadium
Umpires:
Khalid Hussain (HKG)
Hideki Kinoshita (JPN)

22 September 2026
09:00

| Pakistan | 5–1 | Uzbekistan |
|---|---|---|
| Ammad 18'; Khan 33', 57'; Rehman 40'; Mahmood 45' | Report | Salimjonov 30+' |

Gifu Prefectural Green Stadium
Umpires:
Zhou Fuyi (CHN)
Coen van Bunge (NED)

24 September 2026
13:00

| Oman | 2–3 | Uzbekistan |
|---|---|---|
| Al-Hasni 38'; Al-Fazari 45+' | Report | Husanov 36', 53'; Khakimov 54' |

Gifu Prefectural Green Stadium
Umpires:
Mohammad Shahbaz Ali (BAN)
James Unkles (AUS)

26 September 2026
19:00

| Uzbekistan | 1–3 | China |
|---|---|---|
| Abboskhonov 5' | Report | Zhao 10', 36'; Gao 22' |

Gifu Prefectural Green Stadium
Umpires:
Rawi Anbananthan (MAS)
Rama Potnis (IND)

28 September 2026
13:00

| Uzbekistan | 1–3 | Thailand |
|---|---|---|
| Komilov 43' | Report | Chueamkaew 5'; Khammi 14'; Hayeeda-Oh 15' |

Gifu Prefectural Green Stadium
Umpires:
Deepak Joshi (IND)
You Hyo-sik (KOR)

Ninth place match

3 October 2026
09:00

| Sri Lanka | 4–2 | Uzbekistan |
|---|---|---|
| Fernando 27'; Sudusinghe 27'; Bothale 49'; Rathnayake 55' | Report | Khakimov 13'; Sotlikov 33' |

Gifu Prefectural Green Stadium
Umpires:
Mazin Al-Shukaili (OMA)
Haroon Rashid (PAK)

=== Women's tournament ===
Team squads

The following is the Uzbekistan roster in the women's field hockey tournament of the 2026 Asian Games.

Head Coach:

1. Rushana Chorieva (GK)
2. Ugiloy Fakhriddinova
3. Irina Semyonova (C)
6. Mutabar Amrieva
7. Madinabonu Khujaeva
8. Zulkhumor Khaydarova
9. Fotima Abduganieva
10. Mariya Demina
11. Parvina Fayzillaeva
12. Zulfiyakhon Khaytboeva
13. Yuliya Yubko
15. Shahzoda Zaripova
16. Marjona Mamatmurodova
17. Mekhrangiz Abdugaforova
19. Noilakhon Khakimova
44. Aziza Akhmedova (GK)
66. Nurkhayot Odilova
77. Roziyakhon Soyibjonova

Preliminary round

| Pos | Team | Pld | W | D | L | GF | GA | GD | Pts | Qualification |
|---|---|---|---|---|---|---|---|---|---|---|
| 1 | India | 5 | 5 | 0 | 0 | 66 | 3 | +63 | 15 | Semi-finals |
| 2 | Japan (H) | 5 | 4 | 0 | 1 | 23 | 4 | +19 | 12 | Semi-finals |
| 3 | Thailand | 5 | 2 | 0 | 3 | 6 | 25 | −19 | 6 | Fifth place classification |
| 4 | Indonesia | 5 | 2 | 0 | 3 | 6 | 27 | −21 | 6 | Fifth place classification |
| 5 | Singapore | 5 | 1 | 0 | 4 | 4 | 18 | −14 | 3 | Ninth place game |
| 6 | Uzbekistan | 5 | 1 | 0 | 4 | 5 | 33 | −28 | 3 | Eleventh place game |

Source: FIH
Rules for classification: 1) points; 2) matches won; 3) goal difference; 4) goals for; 5) head-to-head result; 6) field goals for.
(H) Hosts

20 September 2026
11:00

| India | 19–0 | Uzbekistan |
|---|---|---|
| Lalremsiami 7'; Deepika 8', 22', 25', 33', 36', 38', 41', 54'; Ishika 11', 42', 54'; Baljeet 12'; Neha 18'; Navneet 23', 45'; Lalthantluangi 43', 51'; Rana 43' | Report |

Gifu Prefectural Green Stadium
Umpires:
Valerie Koh (SGP)
Liu Yu-Chen (TPE)

21 September 2026
15:00

| Uzbekistan | 1–3 | Thailand |
|---|---|---|
| Khujaeva 17' | Report | Konthong 10'; Inpa 26'; Jirapitisatja 40' |

Gifu Prefectural Green Stadium
Umpires:
Zarina Ilyassova (KAZ)
Kelly Hudson (NZL)

23 September 2026
17:00

| Uzbekistan | 1–7 | Japan |
|---|---|---|
| Yubko 8' | Report | Kobayakawa 1', 38', 50'; Toriyama 15', 58'; Kawaguchi 20'; Suzuki 27' |

Gifu Prefectural Green Stadium
Umpires:
Rama Potnis (IND)
Akalanka Ishan Kumara (SRI)

25 September 2026
17:00

| Singapore | 3–1 | Uzbekistan |
|---|---|---|
| Sim 39'; Chia 47'; J. Ng 48' | Report | Yubko 37' |

Gifu Prefectural Green Stadium
Umpires:
Rinky See (HKG)
Binish Hayat (PAK)

27 September 2026
11:00

| Indonesia | 1–2 | Uzbekistan |
|---|---|---|
| Maulani 58' | Report | Amrieva 3'; Semyonova 47' |

Gifu Prefectural Green Stadium
Umpires:
Valerie Koh (SGP)
Shahiela Johari (MAS)

Eleventh place match

30 September 2026
09:00

| Kazakhstan | 1–1 | Uzbekistan |
|---|---|---|
| Lobanova 9' | Report; SO Report | Demina 33' |
Penalties
| Gataulina (penalty shoot-out scored); Gataulina (penalty shoot-out scored); Lobanova (penalty shoot-out scored); Domashneva (penalty shoot-out scored) | 4–2 | (penalty shoot-out scored) Demina; (penalty shoot-out scored) Khaytboeva; (penalty shoot-out missed) Semyonova; (penalty shoot-out missed) Zaripova |

Gifu Prefectural Green Stadium
Umpires:
Rinky See (HKG)
Shahiela Johari (MAS)

== Football ==
Uzbekistan announced their final squad on 8 September 2026.

Summary

Key:

- A.E.T – After extra time.
- P – Match decided by penalty-shootout.

| Team | Event | Group Stage | | | | Quarterfinals | Semifinals | Final / BM | |
| Team | Event | Opposition Score | Opposition Score | Opposition Score | Rank | Opposition Score | Opposition Score | Opposition Score | Rank |
|---|---|---|---|---|---|---|---|---|---|
| Uzbekistan men's under-23 | Men's tournament | Philippines; W 5–1 | Kuwait; W 2–0 | Vietnam; W 2–0 | 1 Q | Saudi Arabia; W 3–0 | Japan; L 1–1 (8–9) | China; L 2–2 (3–4) | 4 |
| Uzbekistan women's | Women's tournament | Philippines; D 1–1 | China; D 1–1 | Hong Kong; W 2–1 | 2 Q | South Korea; L 3–6 | Did not advance | | 6 |

=== Men's tournament ===
Head coach: Ravshan Khaydarov

| No. | Pos. | Player | Date of birth (age) | Caps | Goals | Club |
|---|---|---|---|---|---|---|
| 21 | GK | Samandar Muratbaev | 3 March 2005 (aged 21) | | | (Uzbekistan Football Association) Nasaf |
| 1 | GK | Maksim Murkaev | 21 February 2005 (aged 21) | | | (Uzbekistan Football Association) Paxtakor |
| 12 | GK | Umar Rustamov | 6 May 2005 (aged 21) | | | (Uzbekistan Football Association) Olimpik MobiUz |
| 4 | DF | Giyosjon Rizakulov | 20 February 2005 (aged 21) | | | (Uzbekistan Football Association) Qizilqum |
| 26 | DF | Bekhruz Shukurullaev | 27 October 2006 (aged 19) | | | (Uzbekistan Football Association) Surkhon |
| 3 | DF | Dilshod Murtazaev | 20 September 2006 (aged 19) | | | (Uzbekistan Football Association) Nasaf |
| 5 | DF | Kuvonch Khushvaktov | 14 April 2006 (aged 20) | | | (Uzbekistan Football Association) Nasaf |
| 20 | DF | Dilshod Abdullaev | 9 May 2006 (aged 20) | | | (Uzbekistan Football Association) Paxtakor |
| 19 | DF | Mukhammmadbobur Karimov | 13 March 2006 (aged 20) | | | (Uzbekistan Football Association) Paxtakor |
| 23 | DF | Diyor Abdunazarov | 22 February 2005 (aged 21) | | | (Uzbekistan Football Association) Nasaf |
| 14 | DF | Ruziboy Fayzullaev | 16 October 2005 (aged 20) | | | (Uzbekistan Football Association) Olimpik MobiUz |
| 2 | DF | Saidkhon Khamidov | 20 January 2005 (aged 21) | | | (Uzbekistan Football Association) Olimpik MobiUz |
| 6 | MF | Ravshan Khayrullaev | 21 August 2005 (aged 21) | | | (Uzbekistan Football Association) Bukhara |
| 16 | MF | Mukhammadali Reimov | 20 May 2006 (aged 20) | | | (Uzbekistan Football Association) Lokomotiv |
| 9 | MF | Saidumarkhon Saidnurullaev | 13 April 2005 (aged 21) | | | (Uzbekistan Football Association) Metallurg |
| 13 | MF | Bunyodbek Rakhimov | 27 April 2005 (aged 21) | | | (Uzbekistan Football Association) Olimpik MobiUz |
| 7 | MF | Sardorbek Bakhromov | 16 February 2005 (aged 21) | | | (Uzbekistan Football Association) Nasaf |
| 8 | MF | Ollobergan Karimov | 17 June 2006 (aged 20) | | | (Uzbekistan Football Association) Soʻgʻdiyona |
| 15 | MF | Azizbek Tulkinbekov | 10 February 2007 (aged 19) | | | (Uzbekistan Football Association) Bunyodkor |
| 18 | MF | Oybek Urmonjonov | 9 October 2006 (aged 19) | | | (Uzbekistan Football Association) Dinamo |
| 11 | MF | Asilbek Jumaev | 25 March 2005 (aged 21) | | | (Uzbekistan Football Association) Neftchi |
| 10 | MF | Mukhammadali Urinboev | 24 April 2005 (aged 21) | | | (Royal Belgian Football Association) Antwerp |
| 24 | FW | Shodiyor Shodiboev | 29 March 2006 (aged 20) | | | (Uzbekistan Football Association) Lokomotiv |
| 17 | FW | Firdavs Abdurakhmanov | 29 March 2005 (aged 21) | | | (Uzbekistan Football Association) Dinamo |
| 22 | FW | Nurlan Ibraimov | 29 August 2005 (aged 21) | | | (Uzbekistan Football Association) Lokomotiv |
| 25 | FW | Amirbek Saidov | 1 February 2005 (aged 21) | | | (Uzbekistan Football Association) Soʻgʻdiyona |

Preliminary rounds – Group C

| Pos | Team | Pld | W | D | L | GF | GA | GD | Pts | Qualification |
|---|---|---|---|---|---|---|---|---|---|---|
| 1 | Uzbekistan | 3 | 3 | 0 | 0 | 9 | 1 | +8 | 9 | Advance to knockout stage |
| 2 | Vietnam | 3 | 1 | 1 | 1 | 3 | 3 | 0 | 4 | Advance to knockout stage |
| 3 | Philippines | 3 | 1 | 0 | 2 | 3 | 8 | −5 | 3 | |
| 4 | Kuwait | 3 | 0 | 1 | 2 | 2 | 5 | −3 | 1 | |

Source: Aichi–Nagoya 26
15 September 2026
15:30

| Uzbekistan | 5–1 | Philippines |
|---|---|---|
| Urinboev 30'; Saidnurullaev 60', 71'; Fayzullaev 73'; Reimov 80' | Report | Meriño 62' |

CS Asset Minato Soccer Stadium, Nagoya
Attendance: 306
Referee: Jin Jingyuan (China)

18 September 2026
19:00

| Kuwait | 0–2 | Uzbekistan |
|---|---|---|
| | Report | Bakhromov 6', 36' |

CS Asset Minato Soccer Stadium, Nagoya
Attendance: 638
Referee: Sami Al-Ismail (Saudi Arabia)

22 September 2026
14:00

| Vietnam | 0–2 | Uzbekistan |
|---|---|---|
| | Report | Urinboev 5'; Ibraimov 67' |

Paloma Mizuho Rugby Stadium, Nagoya
Attendance: 4,134
Referee: Meder Taichiev (Kyrgyzstan)

Quarterfinals

25 September 2026
14:00

| Uzbekistan | 3–0 | Saudi Arabia |
|---|---|---|
| Murtazaev 12'; Tulkenbekov 79'; Abdurakhmonov 86' | Report |

Paloma Mizuho Rugby Stadium, Nagoya
Attendance: 1,308
Referee: Tuan Yaasin (Malaysia)

Semifinals

30 September 2026
19:30

| Uzbekistan | 1–1 (a.e.t.) | Japan |
|---|---|---|
| Bakhromov 8' | Report | Ishibashi 88' |
Penalties
| Bakhromov (penalty scored); Tulkinbekov (penalty missed); Murtazaev (penalty scored); Reimov (penalty scored); Shodiboev (penalty scored); Rizakulov (penalty scored); Fayzullaev (penalty scored); Khamidov (penalty scored); Ibraimov (penalty scored); Khushvaktov (penalty missed) | 8–9 | (penalty scored) Nakajima; (penalty scored) Ozeki; (penalty scored) Ishiwatari; (penalty missed) Nwadike; (penalty scored) Tsuchiya; (penalty scored) Shimamoto; (penalty scored) Yokoyama; (penalty scored) Umeki; (penalty scored) Nagano; (penalty scored) Kosugi |

Nagai Stadium, Osaka
Attendance: 15,550
Referee: Abdulhadi Al-Ruaile (Qatar)

Bronze medal match

3 October 2026
15:00

| (bronze) China | 2–2 | Uzbekistan |
|---|---|---|
| Hu Hetao 15'; Wang Yudong 53' | Report | Bakhromov 42'; Shodiboev 89' |
Penalties
| Liu Haofan (penalty missed); Zhu Chenjie (penalty scored); Xiang Yuwang (penalty scored); Imran Memet (penalty scored); Peng Xiao (penalty scored) | 4–3 | (penalty missed) Reimov; (penalty scored) Murtazaev; (penalty missed) Shodiboev; (penalty scored) Ormonjonov; (penalty scored) Bakhromov |

Toyota Stadium, Toyota
Attendance: 13,770
Referee: Tuan Yaasin (Malaysia)

=== Women's tournament ===
Team squads

The following players list is the Uzbekistan squad for the 2026 Asian Games.

Head Coach: (Lithuania) Kotryna Kulbytė

| No. | Pos. | Player | Date of birth (age) | Club |
|---|---|---|---|---|
| 1 | GK | Maftuna Jonimqulova | 26 July 1999 (age 27) | (Uzbekistan Football Association) Nasaf |
| 12 | GK | Kumushoy Gulomova | 6 November 1999 (age 26) | (Uzbekistan Football Association) Qizilqum |
| 13 | GK | Zarina Saidova | 19 September 2001 (age 25) | (Uzbekistan Football Association) Nasaf |
| 2 | DF | Madina Khikmatova | 9 August 2001 (age 25) | (Uzbekistan Football Association) Nasaf |
| 3 | DF | Kholida Dadaboeva | 12 April 1993 (age 33) | (Uzbekistan Football Association) Qizilqum |
| 4 | DF | Rukhshona Usarova | 26 July 2007 (age 19) | (Uzbekistan Football Association) Sogdiyona |
| 6 | DF | Shodiya Tosheva | 14 May 1997 (age 29) | (Uzbekistan Football Association) Nasaf |
| 11 | DF | Maftuna Shoyimova | 1 January 1999 (age 27) | (Uzbekistan Football Association) Nasaf |
| 15 | DF | Umida Zoirova | 22 April 1998 (age 28) | (Uzbekistan Football Association) Nasaf |
| 21 | DF | Leyla Oraniyazova | 18 October 2004 (age 21) | (Uzbekistan Football Association) AGMK |
| 22 | DF | Sevinch Kuchkorova | 28 September 2004 (age 22) | (Uzbekistan Football Association) AGMK |
| 5 | MF | Rukhshona Olimjonova | 1 January 2007 (age 19) | (Uzbekistan Football Association) AGMK |
| 8 | MF | Ilvina Ablyakimova | 27 April 1995 (age 31) | (Uzbekistan Football Association) Nasaf |
| 16 | MF | Zarina Mamatkarimova | 4 March 2004 (age 22) | (Uzbekistan Football Association) Nasaf |
| 19 | MF | Nozimakhon Ergasheva | 23 January 2001 (age 25) | (Uzbekistan Football Association) AGMK |
| 20 | MF | Mehribon Egamberdieva | 9 October 2007 (age 19) | (Uzbekistan Football Association) Nasaf |
| 7 | FW | Nilufar Kudratova | 5 June 1997 (age 29) | (Uzbekistan Football Association) Nasaf |
| 9 | FW | Dildora Nozimova | 3 November 1997 (age 28) | (Uzbekistan Football Association) Qizilqum |
| 10 | FW | Diyorakhon Khabibullaeva | 15 September 1999 (age 27) | (Uzbekistan Football Association) Nasaf |
| 14 | FW | Oydinoy Turgunova | 15 March 2006 (age 20) | (Uzbekistan Football Association) AGMK |
| 17 | FW | Lyudmila Karachik | 8 December 1994 (age 31) | (Uzbekistan Football Association) Nasaf |
| 18 | FW | Shahnoza Dekanbaeva | 18 January 2008 (age 18) | (Uzbekistan Football Association) Lokomotiv Tashkent |
| 23 | FW | Diyora Bakhtiyarova | 29 August 2007 (age 19) | (Uzbekistan Football Association) Bunyodkor |

Preliminary rounds – Group G

| Pos | Team | Pld | W | D | L | GF | GA | GD | Pts | Qualification |
|---|---|---|---|---|---|---|---|---|---|---|
| 1 | China | 3 | 2 | 1 | 0 | 11 | 3 | +8 | 7 | Advance to knockout stage |
| 2 | Uzbekistan | 3 | 1 | 2 | 0 | 4 | 3 | +1 | 5 | Advance to knockout stage |
| 3 | Philippines | 3 | 1 | 1 | 1 | 4 | 6 | −2 | 4 | Advance to knockout stage |
| 4 | Hong Kong | 3 | 0 | 0 | 3 | 2 | 9 | −7 | 0 | |

Source: Aichi–Nagoya 26

14 September 2026
14:00

| Philippines | 1–1 | Uzbekistan |
|---|---|---|
| Collins 89' | Report | Egamberdieva 81' |

Gifu Nagaragawa Stadium, Gifu
Attendance: 202
Referee: Lê Thị Ly (Vietnam)

17 September 2026
14:00

| Uzbekistan | 1–1 | China |
|---|---|---|
| Dadaboeva 42' | Report | Zhang Linyan 70' |

Gifu Nagaragawa Stadium, Gifu
Attendance: 226
Referee: Azusa Sugino (Japan)

21 September 2026
16:00

| Uzbekistan | 2–1 | Hong Kong |
|---|---|---|
| Khabibullaeva 34'; Shoyimova 90+2' | Report | Wei Lan 65' |

Wave Stadium Kariya, Kariya
Attendance: 561
Referee: Park Se-jin (South Korea)

Quarterfinals

25 September 2026
19:30

| South Korea | 6–3 | Uzbekistan |
|---|---|---|
| Yoon Su-jeong 6', 44'; Choe Yu-ri 17', 45+1'; Khabibullaeva 74' (o.g.); Kim Min-ji 90+4' | Report | Khabibullaeva 10'; Jang Sel-gi 64' (o.g.); Kudratova 66' |

Nagai Stadium, Osaka
Attendance: 240
Referee: Mu Mingxin (China)

== Gymnastics ==
=== Artistic ===
Men

| Athlete | Event | Qualification | | Final | |
| Athlete | Event | Score | Rank | Score | Rank |
|---|---|---|---|---|---|
| Utkirbek Juraev | Pommel horse | 14.400 | 5 Q | 14.733 | 1st place, gold medalist(s) |
| Ravshan Kamiljanov | Pommel horse | 14.466 | 2 Q | 12.733 | 8 |
| Akhrorkhon Temirkhonov | Rings | 12.733 | 21 | —N/a | |
| Rasuljon Abdurakhimov | Parallel bars | 14.233 | 8 Q | 14.433 | 3rd place, bronze medalist(s) |
| Utkirbek Juraev | Parallel bars | 12.400 | 21 | —N/a | |

Women

| Athlete | Event | Qualification | | | | | | Final | | | | | |
| Athlete | Event | Apparatus | | | | Total | Rank | Apparatus | | | | Total | Rank |
| Athlete | Event | V | UB | BB | F | Total | Rank | V | UB | BB | F | Total | Rank |
|---|---|---|---|---|---|---|---|---|---|---|---|---|---|
| Aleksandra Shevchenko | Individual all-around | —N/a | | | | | | 12.433 | 11.300 | 10.533 | 11.066 | 45.332 | 17 |

| Athlete | Event | Qualification | | Final | |
| Athlete | Event | Score | Rank | Score | Rank |
|---|---|---|---|---|---|
| Oksana Chusovitina | Vault | 13.266 | 4 Q | 13.199 | 5 |
| Dildora Aripova | Uneven bars | 12.600 | 15 R | —N/a | |
| Dildora Aripova | Balance beam | 13.100 | 14 R | —N/a | |
| Dildora Aripova | Floor | 13.066 | 8 Q | 13.200 | 4 |

== Handball ==
Summary

| Team | Event | Group stage | | | | | | Rank |
| Team | Event | Opposition Score | Opposition Score | Opposition Score | Opposition Score | Opposition Score | Opposition Score | Rank |
|---|---|---|---|---|---|---|---|---|
| Uzbekistan women's | Women's tournament | Japan; L 12–43 | China; L 14–37 | South Korea; L 13–43 | Vietnam; W 29–21 | Kazakhstan; L 20–35 | Hong Kong; W 28–27 | 5 |

=== Women's tournament ===
Team rosters

- Sarbinaz Saparbaeva (3)
- Mukaddas Juraeva (4)
- Shalola Keldiyorova (5)
- Sabina Mullaeva (7)
- Rukkshona Ruzieva (9)
- Dilnoza Sultanova (10)
- Turoyim Mamirova (12)
- Ilmira Bayjanova (13)
- Khusniya Safarova (14)
- Anastasiya Khudoyarova (15)
- Nilufar Yusufova (16)
- Zulaykho Marimboeva (17)
- Zukhra Botirova (20)
- Anna Popovich (21)

Group play

| Pos | Team | Pld | W | D | L | GF | GA | GD | Pts |
|---|---|---|---|---|---|---|---|---|---|
| 1st place, gold medalist(s) | South Korea | 6 | 6 | 0 | 0 | 243 | 105 | +138 | 12 |
| 2nd place, silver medalist(s) | Japan (H) | 6 | 5 | 0 | 1 | 217 | 120 | +97 | 10 |
| 3rd place, bronze medalist(s) | China | 6 | 4 | 0 | 2 | 189 | 154 | +35 | 8 |
| 4 | Kazakhstan | 6 | 3 | 0 | 3 | 164 | 187 | −23 | 6 |
| 5 | Uzbekistan | 6 | 2 | 0 | 4 | 116 | 206 | −90 | 4 |
| 6 | Hong Kong | 6 | 1 | 0 | 5 | 131 | 209 | −78 | 2 |
| 7 | Vietnam | 6 | 0 | 0 | 6 | 128 | 207 | −79 | 0 |

Source: asiangames2026.org
(H) Hosts

| 20 September 2026; 17:30 | Japan | 43–12 | Uzbekistan | Kasugai City Gymnasium; Referees: Lee, Lee (KOR) |
| 20 September 2026; 17:30 | Matsuura 10 | (17–7) | Saparbaeva 5 | Kasugai City Gymnasium; Referees: Lee, Lee (KOR) |
| 20 September 2026; 17:30 | 2× (suspension) | Report | 3× (suspension) | Kasugai City Gymnasium; Referees: Lee, Lee (KOR) |

| 22 September 2026; 17:30 | Uzbekistan | 14–37 | China | Kasugai City Gymnasium; Referees: Gheisarian, Gheisarian (IRI) |
| 22 September 2026; 17:30 | Saparbaeva 4 | (6–18) | Liang 7 | Kasugai City Gymnasium; Referees: Gheisarian, Gheisarian (IRI) |
| 22 September 2026; 17:30 | 2× (suspension) | Report | 4× (suspension) | Kasugai City Gymnasium; Referees: Gheisarian, Gheisarian (IRI) |

| 23 September 2026; 15:30 | Uzbekistan | 13–43 | South Korea | Kasugai City Gymnasium; Referees: Abo, Al-Rashed (JOR) |
| 23 September 2026; 15:30 | Saparbaeva 5 | (8–22) | Joo 7 | Kasugai City Gymnasium; Referees: Abo, Al-Rashed (JOR) |
| 23 September 2026; 15:30 | 3× (suspension) | Report | 3× (suspension) | Kasugai City Gymnasium; Referees: Abo, Al-Rashed (JOR) |

| 25 September 2026; 12:30 | Vietnam | 21–29 | Uzbekistan | Toyoda Gosei Memorial Gymnasium; Referees: Cha, Pak (KOR) |
| 25 September 2026; 12:30 | Phùng 5 | (13–15) | Mullaeva 8 | Toyoda Gosei Memorial Gymnasium; Referees: Cha, Pak (KOR) |
| 25 September 2026; 12:30 | 2× (suspension) | Report | 5× (suspension) | Toyoda Gosei Memorial Gymnasium; Referees: Cha, Pak (KOR) |

| 26 September 2026; 12:30 | Kazakhstan | 35–20 | Uzbekistan | Toyoda Gosei Memorial Gymnasium; Referees: Lee, Lee (KOR) |
| 26 September 2026; 12:30 | three players 6 | (15–9) | Ruzieva 5 | Toyoda Gosei Memorial Gymnasium; Referees: Lee, Lee (KOR) |
| 26 September 2026; 12:30 | 4× (suspension) | Report | 3× (suspension) | Toyoda Gosei Memorial Gymnasium; Referees: Lee, Lee (KOR) |

| 27 September 2026; 13:00 | Uzbekistan | 28–27 | Hong Kong | Toyoda Gosei Memorial Gymnasium; Referees: Mozafarivanani, Mazaheri (IRI) |
| 27 September 2026; 13:00 | Mullaeva, Safarova 5 | (11–14) | Wong 7 | Toyoda Gosei Memorial Gymnasium; Referees: Mozafarivanani, Mazaheri (IRI) |
| 27 September 2026; 13:00 | 2× (suspension) | Report | 3× (suspension) | Toyoda Gosei Memorial Gymnasium; Referees: Mozafarivanani, Mazaheri (IRI) |

== Karate ==
Men

| Athlete | Event | Round of 16 | Quarterfinals | Semifinals | Repechage | Final / BM | |
| Athlete | Event | Opposition Result | Opposition Result | Opposition Result | Opposition Result | Opposition Result | Rank |
|---|---|---|---|---|---|---|---|
| Khuyonmirzo Khalimov | –55 kg | —N/a | Kaliana Sundram (MAS); W 3–0 | Manandhar (NEP); W 7–0 | —N/a | Bigabyl (KAZ); L 1–9 | 2nd place, silver medalist(s) |
| Mekhriddin Turakhonov | –60 kg | Abdelhamid (QAT); L 1–4 | Did not advance | | Chu (VIE); L 3–3 | Did not advance | |
| Abdul Vakhkhob Rashidov | –67 kg | Cheng HP (HKG); W 8–0 | Daifallah (PLE); W 5–1 | Al-Masatfa (JOR); W 8–0 | —N/a | Kozaki (JPN); W 7–5 | 1st place, gold medalist(s) |

Women

| Athlete | Event | Round of 16 | Quarterfinals | Semifinals | Repechage | Final / BM | |
| Athlete | Event | Opposition Result | Opposition Result | Opposition Result | Opposition Result | Opposition Result | Rank |
|---|---|---|---|---|---|---|---|
| Gulshan Alimardanova | –50 kg | Chokprasertgul (THA); W 5–5 | Myajan (KSA); W 10–1 | Chandran (MAS); L 2–3 | —N/a | Fong MW (MAC); L 5–6 | 5 |
| Sevinch Rakhimova | –55 kg | Bye | Robert (MAS); L 7–8 | Did not advance | Jasem (KUW); W 3–1 | Samasheva (KAZ); L 0–0 | 5 |
| Bonu Egamberdieva | +68 kg | —N/a | Lubis (INA); L 0–3 | Did not advance | | | |

== Modern pentathlon ==
Uzbekistan entered three pentathletes to compete at the Games.

| Athlete | Event | Fencing ranking round (épée one touch) | | Semi-finals | | | | | | | | | | | | | Final | | | | | | | | | | | | |
| Athlete | Event | Fencing ranking round (épée one touch) | | Fencing | | Obstacles | | | Swimming (100 m freestyle) | | | Laser-run (10 m laser pistol / 3000 m cross-country) | | | Total points | Final rank | Fencing | | Obstacles | | | Swimming | | | Laser-run | | | Total points | Final rank |
| Athlete | Event | V–D | Rank | Rank | MP points | Time | Rank | MP points | Time | Rank | MP points | Time | Rank | MP points | Total points | Final rank | Rank | MP points | Time | Rank | MP points | Time | Rank | MP points | Time | Rank | MP points | Total points | Final rank |
|---|---|---|---|---|---|---|---|---|---|---|---|---|---|---|---|---|---|---|---|---|---|---|---|---|---|---|---|---|---|
| Dmitriy Tretyakov | Men | 20–15 | 15 | 7 | 226 | 0:30.04 | 13 | 355 | 0:56.19 | 3 | 320 | 11:23.50 | 4 | 617 | 1518 | 5 Q | 14 | 208 | 00:26.86 | 14 | 365 | 00:57.06 | 10 | 315 | 11:05.25 | 11 | 635 | 1523 | 14 |
| Samira Abzalova | Women | 19–13 | 13 | 9 | 218 | 0:45.43 | 10 | 309 | 1:06.74 | 9 | 267 | 12:55.01 | 6 | 525 | 1319 | 9 Q | 12 | 212 | 0:32.84 | 10 | 347 | 1:06.58 | 17 | 268 | 12:25.25 | 9 | 555 | 1382 | 11 |
| Mehriniso Kahramaonova | Women | 20–12 | 10 | 6 | 228 | 0:29.58 | 2 | 357 | 1:05.37 | 8 | 274 | 12:55.04 | 5 | 525 | 1384 | 3 Q | 7 | 226 | 0:29.14 | 3 | 358 | 1:05.34 | 4 | 274 | 12:04.61 | 4 | 576 | 1434 | 4 |

== Shooting ==
Men

| Athlete | Event | Qualification | | Final | |
| Athlete | Event | Points | Rank | Points | Rank |
|---|---|---|---|---|---|
| Mukhammad Kamalov | 10 m air pistol | 570-16x | 30 | Did not advance | |
| Sodikjon Abdullaev | 10 m air pistol | 575-13x | 18 | Did not advance | |
| Vladimir Svechnikov | 10 m air pistol | 582-21x | 6 Q | 244.3 GR | 1st place, gold medalist(s) |
| Mukhammad Kamalov; Sodikjon Abdullaev; Vladimir Svechnikov | 10 m air pistol team | —N/a | | 1727-50x | 5 |
| Javohir Sokhibov | 10 m air rifle | 627.0 | 16 | Did not advance | |
| Javohir Sokhibov | 50 m rifle 3 position | 579-24x | 18 | Did not advance | |
| Azamat Kayumov | Trap | 118 | 6 Q | 15 | 4 |
| Okhunjon Abdukodirov | Trap | 114 | 17 | Did not advance | |
| Timur Enaliev | Trap | 106 | 36 | Did not advance | |
| Azamat Kayumov; Okhunjon Abdukodirov; Timur Enaliev | Trap team | —N/a | | 338 | 7 |
| Bekhruz Sharapov | Skeet | 114 | 19 | Did not advance | |
| Bekzod Abdurakhimov | Skeet | 111 | 30 | Did not advance | |
| Ruslan Utaganov | Skeet | 106 | 38 | Did not advance | |
| Bekhruz Sharapov; Bekzod Abdurakhimov; Ruslan Utaganov | Skeet team | —N/a | | 331 | 7 |

Women

| Athlete | Event | Qualification | | Final | |
| Athlete | Event | Points | Rank | Points | Rank |
|---|---|---|---|---|---|
| Nigina Saidkulova | 10 m air pistol | 570-21x | 20 | Did not advance | |
| Nigina Saidkulova | 25 m pistol | 567-13x | 34 | Did not advance | |
| Mukhtasar Tokhirova | 10 m air rifle | DSQ | | | |
| Mukhtasar Tokhirova | 50 m rifle 3 position | 581-22x | 28 | Did not advance | |

Mixed team

| Athlete | Event | Qualification | | Final | |
| Athlete | Event | Points | Rank | Points | Rank |
|---|---|---|---|---|---|
| Mukhammad Kamalov; Nigina Saidkulova | 10 m air pistol | 575-18x | 10 | Did not advance | |
| Javohir Sokhibov; Mukhtasar Tokhirova | 10 m air rifle | 624.7 | 8 | Did not advance | |

== Table tennis ==
Men

| Athlete | Event | Round of 64 | Round of 32 | Round of 16 | Quarterfinal | Semifinal | Final | |
| Athlete | Event | Opposition Result | Opposition Result | Opposition Result | Opposition Result | Opposition Result | Opposition Result | Rank |
|---|---|---|---|---|---|---|---|---|
| Diyorbek Dilshodov | Singles | Ri J-s (PRK); L 0–4 | Did not advance | | | | | |
| Shokrukh Iskandarov | Singles | Myandal (MGL); W 4–2 | Wong CT (HKG); L 1–4 | Did not advance | | | | |
| Diyorbek Dilshodov; Shokrukh Iskandarov | Doubles | Bye | Quek / Pang (SGP); L 0–3 | Did not advance | | | | |

Women

| Athlete | Event | Round of 64 | Round of 32 | Round of 16 | Quarterfinal | Semifinal | Final | |
| Athlete | Event | Opposition Result | Opposition Result | Opposition Result | Opposition Result | Opposition Result | Opposition Result | Rank |
|---|---|---|---|---|---|---|---|---|
| Arujan Kamalova | Singles | Thapa (NEP); W 4–0 | Akasheva (UZB); L 0–4 | Did not advance | | | | |
| Asel Erkebaeva | Singles | Sanjaa (MGL); W 4–1 | Su TT (HKG); L 2–4 | Did not advance | | | | |
| Arujan Kamalova; Asel Erkebaeva | Doubles | Bye | Doo HK / Ng WL (HKG); L 1–3 | Did not advance | | | | |

Mixed

| Athlete | Event | Round of 64 | Round of 32 | Round of 16 | Quarterfinal | Semifinal | Final | |
| Athlete | Event | Opposition Result | Opposition Result | Opposition Result | Opposition Result | Opposition Result | Opposition Result | Rank |
|---|---|---|---|---|---|---|---|---|
| Arujan Kamalova; Shokrukh Iskandarov | Doubles | Bye | Wang CQ / Sun YS (CHN); L 0–3 | Did not advance | | | | |
| Asel Erkebaeva; Diyorbek Dilshodov | Doubles | Shinozuka / Ito (JPN); L 0–3 | Did not advance | | | | | |

Team

| Athlete | Event | Group stage | | | Round of 16 | Quarterfinal | Semifinal | Final | |
| Athlete | Event | Opposition Score | Opposition Score | Rank | Opposition Score | Opposition Score | Opposition Score | Opposition Score | Rank |
|---|---|---|---|---|---|---|---|---|---|
| Diyorbek Dilshodov; Khurshid Akhmedov; Shokrukh Iskandarov | Men's | Uzbekistan; L 0–3 | Maldives; W 3–0 | 2 Q | Thailand; L 0–3 | Did not advance | | | |
| Adelina Khasanova; Arujan Kamalova; Asel Erkebaeva | Women's | Japan; L 0–3 | Mongolia; W 3–1 | 2 Q | Kazakhstan; W 3–2 | China; L 0–3 | Did not advance | | |

== Triathlon ==
Individual

| Athlete | Event | Time | | | | | | Rank |
| Athlete | Event | Swim (0.75 km) | Trans 1 | Bike (20 km) | Trans 2 | Run (5 km) | Total | Rank |
|---|---|---|---|---|---|---|---|---|
| Aleksandr Kurishov | Men | 8:50 | 0:40 | 28:25 | 0:21 | 18:53 | 57:09 | 20 |
| Jeremy Quindos | Men | 8:56 | 0:35 | 28:20 | 0:17 | 15:08 | 53:16 | 4 |
| Alina Khakimova | Women | 10:20 | 0:42 | 31:51 | 0:21 | 18:50 | 1:02:04 | 12 |
| Diana Biktimirova | Women | 10:10 | 0:48 | DNF | | | | |

Relay

| Athlete | Event | Time | | | | | | Rank |
| Athlete | Event | Swim (300 m) | Trans 1 | Bike (6.6 km) | Trans 2 | Run (1 km) | Total | Rank |
|---|---|---|---|---|---|---|---|---|
| Alina Khakimova | Mixed | 4:29 | 0:59 | 11:10 | 0:24 | 7:06 | 24:08 | —N/a |
| Aleksandr Kurishov | Mixed | 3:55 | 0:43 | 10:26 | 0:22 | 6:31 | 21:57 | —N/a |
| Diana Biktimirova | Mixed | 4:37 | 0:50 | 11:28 | 0:27 | 7:58 | 25:20 | —N/a |
| Jeremy Quindos | Mixed | 4:05 | 0:44 | 9:31 | 0:21 | 6:25 | 21:06 | —N/a |
| Total | Mixed | —N/a | | | | | 1:32:31 | 8 |

== Volleyball ==
=== Beach ===
| Athletes | Event | Preliminary round | | | | Round of 16 | Quarterfinal | Semifinal | Final / BM | |
| Athletes | Event | Opposition Score | Opposition Score | Opposition Score | Rank | Opposition Score | Opposition Score | Opposition Score | Opposition Score | Rank |
|---|---|---|---|---|---|---|---|---|---|---|
| Azamat Dauilbaev; Dilshodbek Tolibaev | Men | Song JW / Wang YW (CHN); L 0–2 (8–21, 23–25) | Mokhammad / Yakovlev (KAZ); W 2–1 (14–21, 21–16, 15–12) | Tachiya / Ishijima (JPN); L 0–2 | 3 | Did not advance | | | | |

=== Indoor ===
Summary

| Team | Event | Group stage | | | | Quarterfinals | Semifinals | Final / BM | |
| Team | Event | Opposition Score | Opposition Score | Opposition Score | Rank | Opposition Score | Opposition Score | Opposition Score | Rank |
|---|---|---|---|---|---|---|---|---|---|
| Uzbekistan men's | Men's tournament | Japan; L 0–3 | Pakistan; L 0–3 | Kazakhstan; L 1–3 | 4 | Vietnam; L 0–3 | Philippines; L 1–3 | Hong Kong; W 3–0 | 15 |

==== Men's tournament ====
Team roster

- Khabibullokh Isamov
- Ogabek Haydarov
- Umirbek Rakhimov
- Bilolbek Hakimov
- Asadbek Juraev
- Shokhboz Mamayusufov
- Yakhyo Muhamadiev
- Mirziyod Murodov
- Shakhzod Omonov
- Islomjon Sobirov
- Saidjamol Murobidinov
- Aybek Kaypanov

Group play

| Pos | Team | Pld | W | L | Pts | SW | SL | SR | SPW | SPL | SPR | Qualification |
|---|---|---|---|---|---|---|---|---|---|---|---|---|
| 1 | Japan (H) | 3 | 3 | 0 | 9 | 9 | 0 | MAX | 229 | 173 | 1.324 | Quarterfinals |
| 2 | Pakistan | 3 | 2 | 1 | 6 | 6 | 4 | 1.500 | 236 | 218 | 1.083 | Quarterfinals |
| 3 | Kazakhstan | 3 | 1 | 2 | 3 | 4 | 7 | 0.571 | 221 | 253 | 0.874 | Classification 9th–16th |
| 4 | Uzbekistan | 3 | 0 | 3 | 0 | 1 | 9 | 0.111 | 196 | 238 | 0.824 | Classification 9th–16th |

Source: asiangames2026.org
Rules for classification: Tiebreakers
(H) Host

== Weightlifting ==
On 9 September 2026 Uzbekistan Weightlifting Federation announced the names of athletes.

=== Men ===
| Athlete | Event | Snatch | | | | | Clean & Jerk | | | | | Total | Rank |
| Athlete | Event | 1 | 2 | 3 | Result | Rank | 1 | 2 | 3 | Result | Rank | Total | Rank |
|---|---|---|---|---|---|---|---|---|---|---|---|---|---|
| Adkhamjon Ergashev | 70 kg | | | | | | | | | | | | |
| Diyorbek Ruzmetov | 75 kg | | | | | | | | | | | | |
| Khasanboy Bardiev | 85 kg | | | | | | | | | | | | |
| Mukhammadkodir Toshtemirov | 95 kg | | | | | | | | | | | | |
| Akbar Djuraev | 110 kg | | | | | | | | | | | | |

=== Women ===
| Athlete | Event | Snatch | | | | | Clean & Jerk | | | | | Total | Rank |
| Athlete | Event | 1 | 2 | 3 | Result | Rank | 1 | 2 | 3 | Result | Rank | Total | Rank |
|---|---|---|---|---|---|---|---|---|---|---|---|---|---|
| Nigora Abdullaeva | 53 kg | 86 | 89 | 91 | 91 | 5 | 107 | 110 | ~~113~~ | 110 | 5 | 201 | 5 |

== Wrestling ==
Uzbekistan entered twelve male and six female wrestlers.

Key:

- VT (ranking points: 5–0 or 0–5) – Victory by fall.
- VB (ranking points: 5–0 or 0–5) – Victory by injury (VF for forfeit, VA for withdrawal or disqualification)
- PP (ranking points: 3–1 or 1–3) – Decision by points – the loser with technical points.
- PO (ranking points: 3–0 or 0–3) – Decision by points – the loser without technical points.
- ST (ranking points: 4–0 or 0–4) – Great superiority – the loser without technical points and a margin of victory of at least 8 (Greco-Roman) or 10 (freestyle) points.
- SP (ranking points: 4–1 or 1–4) – Technical superiority – the loser with technical points and a margin of victory of at least 8 (Greco-Roman) or 10 (freestyle) points.

Freestyle

| Athlete | Event | Round of 32 | Round of 16 | Quarterfinals | Semifinals | Repechage | Final / BM | |
| Athlete | Event | Opposition Result | Opposition Result | Opposition Result | Opposition Result | Opposition Result | Opposition Result | Rank |
|---|---|---|---|---|---|---|---|---|
| Gulomjon Abdullaev | Men's –57 kg | Ogawa (JPN); L 2–4 ^{PP} | Did not advance | | | | | |
| Umidjon Jalolov | Men's –65 kg | Bye | Kim (PRK); L 0–2 ^{PO} | Did not advance | | | | |
| Razambek Zhamalov | Men's –74 kg | —N/a | Emami (IRI); L 6–7 ^{PP} | Did not advance | | Jaglan (IND); L 3–7 ^{PP} | Did not advance | |
| Bobur Islomov | Men's –86 kg | —N/a | Patel (NEP); W 10–0 ^{ST} | Shavaev (KGZ); L 2–10 ^{PP} | Did not advance | | | |
| Sherzod Poyonov | Men's –97 kg | —N/a | Sharipov (BRN); W 3–3 ^{PP} | Gankhuyag (MGL); W 2–1 ^{PP} | Punia (IND); W 9–8 ^{PP} | —N/a | Azarpira (IRI); L 0–10 ^{ST} | 2nd place, silver medalist(s) |
| Khasanboy Rakhimov | Men's –125 kg | —N/a | | Kassimbek (KAZ); L 4–14 ^{SP} | Did not advance | | | |
| Aktenge Keunimjaeva | Women's –50 kg | —N/a | Hewa (SRI); W 5–0 ^{VT} | Đỗ (VIE); W 5–0 ^{VT} | Kim (PRK); L 0–11 ^{ST} | Bye | Feng (CHN); L 0–10 ^{ST} | 5 |
| Sakibjamal Esbosynova | Women's –53 kg | —N/a | Bye | Panghal (IND); L 0–8 ^{VT} | Did not advance | Omirbek (KAZ); L 2–2 ^{VT} | Did not advance | |
| Laylokhon Sobirova | Women's –57 kg | —N/a | Mutoharoh (INA); W 10–0 ^{ST} | Raimova (KAZ); L 5–18 ^{SP} | Did not advance | | | |
| Mukhayyo Narzilloeva | Women's –62 kg | —N/a | Zhang (CHN); L 0–10 ^{ST} | Did not advance | | | | |
| Firuza Esenbaeva | Women's –68 kg | —N/a | Bye | Zhumanazarova (KGZ); L 0–8 ^{VT} | Did not advance | | | |
| Sevinchoy Polvonova | Women's –76 kg | —N/a | Bye | Kagami (JPN); L 0–10 ^{ST} | Did not advance | Bye | Medet Kyzy (KGZ); L 0–10 ^{ST} | 5 |

Greco-Roman

| Athlete | Event | Round of 16 | Quarterfinals | Semifinals | Repechage | Final / BM | |
| Athlete | Event | Opposition Result | Opposition Result | Opposition Result | Opposition Result | Opposition Result | Rank |
|---|---|---|---|---|---|---|---|
| Alisher Ganiev | Men's −60 kg | Callado (PHI); W 9–0 ^{ST} | Suzuki (JPN); W 11–0 ^{ST} | Abbaspourragani (IRI); W 8–4 ^{PP} | —N/a | Sharshenbekov (KGZ); L 5–7 ^{PP} | 2nd place, silver medalist(s) |
| Aytjan Khalmakhanov | Men's −67 kg | Leng (CHN); W 9–0 ^{ST} | Jandu (KSA); W 8–0 ^{ST} | Beishekeev (KGZ); W 5–0 ^{PO} | —N/a | Sogabe (JPN); W 3–2 ^{PO} | 1st place, gold medalist(s) |
| Abdullo Aliev | Men's −77 kg | Noh (KOR); L 1–2 ^{PO} | Did not advance | | | | |
| Jalgasbay Berdimuratov | Men's −87 kg | Shi (CHN); W 8–0 ^{ST} | Zhanyshov (KGZ); L 0–4 ^{PO} | Did not advance | —N/a | Ozhaev (KAZ); W 9–1 ^{SP} | 3rd place, bronze medalist(s) |
| Amirkhon Berdikulov | Men's −97 kg | Lee (KOR); L 7–12 ^{PP} | Did not advance | | | | |
| Rafael Tsitsuashvili | Men's −130 kg | Kim (KOR); W 1–1 ^{PP} | Syrlybay (KAZ); W 2–1 ^{PP} | Agadadaýew (TKM); W 8–0 ^{ST} | —N/a | Mirzazadeh (IRI); L 1–3 ^{PP} | 2nd place, silver medalist(s) |

== Wushu ==
=== Taolu ===
Men

| Athlete | Event | Event 1 | | Event 2 | | Total | Rank |
| Athlete | Event | Result | Rank | Result | Rank | Total | Rank |
|---|---|---|---|---|---|---|---|
| Aziz Kakhramonov | Men's changquan | 9.353 | 15 | —N/a | | 9.353 | 15 |
| Diyorbek Duyshaboev | Men's nanquan & nangun | | | | | | |
| Darya Latisheva | Women's nanquan & nandao | | | | | | |

=== Sanda ===
Men

| Athlete | Event | Round of 32 | Round of 16 | Quarter-finals | Semi-finals | Final | |
| Athlete | Event | Opposition Score | Opposition Score | Opposition Score | Opposition Score | Opposition Score | Rank |
|---|---|---|---|---|---|---|---|
| Saydullo Abdurashitov | –56 kg | —N/a | – | – | – | – | |
| Abdulkhamid Odilov | –60 kg | —N/a | – | – | – | – | |
| Avazbek Makhamadjonov | –65 kg | Uurtsaikh (MGL); W 2–0 | – | – | – | – | |
| Doniyor Turgunbaev | –75 kg | —N/a | Narantsetseg (MGL); W WPD | – | – | – | |

Women

| Athlete | Event | Round of 16 | Quarter-finals | Semi-finals | Final | |
| Athlete | Event | Opposition Score | Opposition Score | Opposition Score | Opposition Score | Rank |
|---|---|---|---|---|---|---|
| Farogat Nurmamatova | –52 kg | Xaiyasit (LAO); L 0–2 | Did not advance | | | |
| Shakhzoda Azatova | –60 kg | – | – | – | – | |

== See also ==
- Uzbekistan at the 2026 Asian Para Games
