= Football at the 2026 Asian Games – Men's tournament =

Men's Football Tournament at the 2026 Asian Games

Tournament details
- Host country: Japan
- Dates: 15 September – 3 October
- Teams: 15
- Venues: 5 (in 4 host cities)

Final positions
- Champions: South Korea (4th title)
- Runners-up: Japan
- Third place: China
- Fourth place: Uzbekistan

Tournament statistics
- Matches played: 29
- Goals scored: 86 (2.97 per match)
- Attendance: 179,658 (6,195 per match)
- Top scorer(s): (South Korea) Eom Ji-sung (Uzbekistan) Sardorbek Bakhromov (4 goals)

The men's football tournament at the 2026 Asian Games was held from 15 September to 3 October 2026 in Osaka, Toyota, Nagoya and Kariya in Japan.

For the third straight tournament, South Korea beat Japan in the final (2018, 2022, 2026). In doing so, South Korea won its fourth straight gold medal.

== Competition schedule ==
All times are local Japan Standard Time (UTC+9).

G	Group stage	1/4	Quarter-finals	1/2	Semi-finals	B	Bronze medal match	F	Gold medal match

Date Event	Tue 15	Wed 16	Thu 17	Fri 18	Sat 19	Sun 20	Mon 21	Tue 22	Wed 23	Thu 24	Fri 25	Sat 26	Sun 27	Mon 28	Tue 29	Wed 30	Thu 1	Fri 2	Sat 3	
Men	G			G		G		G			1/4					1/2			B	F

== Venues ==
Five venues across four cities are used for the tournament.

Toyota Stadium hosts the final. See the ticketing guide for venue allocations for all matches.

Osaka	Toyota	Nagoya		Kariya
Nagai Stadium	Toyota Stadium	Paloma Mizuho Rugby Stadium	CS Asset Minato Soccer Stadium	Wave Stadium Kariya
Capacity: 47,853	Capacity: 45,000	Capacity: 11,900	Capacity: 6,700	Capacity: 2,602
Football at the 2026 Asian Games – Men's tournament is located in Central Japan

== Draw ==
Iraq withdrew shortly before the draw, leaving the tournament with 15 teams instead of 16.

The draw for the tournament was held on 23 July 2026.

Pot 1	Pot 2	Pot 3	Pot 4
1. Japan (hosts); 2. China; 3. Vietnam; 4. South Korea	5. Uzbekistan; 6. United Arab Emirates; 7. Saudi Arabia; 8. Thailand	9. Iran; 10. Kyrgyzstan; 11. Qatar; 12. Philippines	13. Kuwait; 14. Hong Kong; 15. North Korea

== Squads ==
Each nation must submit a squad of between 18 and 23 players, whom must be born on or after 1 January 2003, and three of whom can be older dispensation players are eligible to compete in the tournament.

== Group stage ==
All times are local, Japan Standard Time (UTC+9).

=== Group A ===
Pos	Team	Pld	W	D	L	GF	GA	GD	Pts	Qualification
1	Japan (H)	3	3	0	0	12	0	+12	9	Advance to knockout stage
2	Thailand	3	2	0	1	8	6	+2	6	Advance to knockout stage
3	Kyrgyzstan	3	1	0	2	6	10	−4	3	
4	Hong Kong	3	0	0	3	1	11	−10	0	

Source: Aichi–Nagoya 26
(H) Hosts
16 September 2026
16:00

Thailand	3–2	Kyrgyzstan
Jehhanafee 55'; Paripan 69', 73'	Report	Iskandarbekov 22'; Balbakov 47'

Toyota Stadium, Toyota
Attendance: 2,563
Referee: Abdulhadi Al-Ruaile (Qatar)
16 September 2026
19:30

Japan	2–0	Hong Kong
Ishii 39'; Nagano 89'	Report

Toyota Stadium, Toyota
Attendance: 7,720
Referee: Tuan Yaasin (Malaysia)

20 September 2026
16:00

Hong Kong	1–5	Thailand
Wu Chun Ming 14'	Report	Thanakrit 39'; Paripan 52'; Tsang Yi Hang 56' (o.g.); Jehhanafee 76'; Worawut 84'

Toyota Stadium, Toyota
Attendance: 10,439
Referee: Hanna Hattab (Syria)
20 September 2026
19:30

Kyrgyzstan	0–7	Japan
	Report	Yokoyama 28'; Nagano 36'; Ozeki 39'; Y. Nakajima 70' (pen.); Ishii 72'; Shimamoto 79', 86'

Toyota Stadium, Toyota
Attendance: 19,205
Referee: Payam Heydari (Iran)

23 September 2026
19:30

Japan	3–0	Thailand
Y. Nakajima 31'; Kosugi 47'; Ishii 48'	Report

Toyota Stadium, Toyota
Attendance: 18,408
Referee: Kim Woo-sung (South Korea)
23 September 2026
19:30

Kyrgyzstan	4–0	Hong Kong
Omarov 7'; Madanov 22'; Abduzhaparov 63'; S. Nematov 86'	Report

Wave Stadium Kariya, Kariya
Attendance: 1,187
Referee: Saud Al-Samhan (Kuwait)

=== Group B ===
Pos	Team	Pld	W	D	L	GF	GA	GD	Pts	Qualification
1	China	3	1	2	0	2	1	+1	5	Advance to knockout stage
2	North Korea	3	1	1	1	5	3	+2	4	Advance to knockout stage
3	Iran	3	1	1	1	4	5	−1	4	
4	United Arab Emirates	3	0	2	1	1	3	−2	2	

Source: Aichi–Nagoya 26
16 September 2026
14:00

United Arab Emirates	1–3	Iran
Hunt 57'	Report	Shahrabadi 49'; Ndiaye 52' (o.g.); Mazraeh 88'

Wave Stadium Kariya, Kariya
Attendance: 671
Referee: Sadullo Gulmurodi (Tajikistan)
16 September 2026
19:00

China	2–1	North Korea
Zhang Yuning 44'; Wu Xi 68'	Report	Choe Kuk 27'

Wave Stadium Kariya, Kariya
Attendance: 1,185
Referee: Meder Taichiev (Kyrgyzstan)

20 September 2026
14:00

Iran	0–0	China
	Report

Wave Stadium Kariya, Kariya
Attendance: 934
Referee: Firdavs Nosafarov (Uzbekistan)
20 September 2026
19:00

North Korea	0–0	United Arab Emirates
	Report

Wave Stadium Kariya, Kariya
Attendance: 1,139
Referee: Adam Kersey (Australia)

23 September 2026
14:30

China	0–0	United Arab Emirates
	Report

Toyota Stadium, Toyota
Attendance: 7,501
Referee: Ahmad A'Qashah (Singapore)
23 September 2026
14:30

Iran	1–4	North Korea
Hosseinzadeh 17'	Report	Choe Kuk 41'; Ra Myong-song 44', 51'; Paek Chung-song 68'

Wave Stadium Kariya, Kariya
Attendance: 1,007
Referee: Sadullo Gulmurodi (Tajikistan)

=== Group C ===
Pos	Team	Pld	W	D	L	GF	GA	GD	Pts	Qualification
1	Uzbekistan	3	3	0	0	9	1	+8	9	Advance to knockout stage
2	Vietnam	3	1	1	1	3	3	0	4	Advance to knockout stage
3	Philippines	3	1	0	2	3	8	−5	3	
4	Kuwait	3	0	1	2	2	5	−3	1	

Source: Aichi–Nagoya 26
15 September 2026
15:30

Uzbekistan	5–1	Philippines
Urinboev 30'; Saidnurullaev 60', 71'; Fayzullaev 73'; Reimov 80'	Report	Meriño 62'

CS Asset Minato Soccer Stadium, Nagoya
Attendance: 306
Referee: Jin Jingyuan (China)
15 September 2026
19:00

Vietnam	1–1	Kuwait
Nguyễn Ngọc Mỹ 80'	Report	Al-Matar 78'

CS Asset Minato Soccer Stadium, Nagoya
Attendance: 1,058
Referee: Kim Woo-sung (South Korea)

18 September 2026
15:30

Philippines	0–2	Vietnam
	Report	Nguyễn Thanh Nhàn 74'; Nguyễn Lê Phát 88'

CS Asset Minato Soccer Stadium, Nagoya
Attendance: 513
Referee: Hiroki Kasahara (Japan)
18 September 2026
19:00

Kuwait	0–2	Uzbekistan
	Report	Bakhromov 6', 36'

CS Asset Minato Soccer Stadium, Nagoya
Attendance: 638
Referee: Sami Al-Ismail (Saudi Arabia)

22 September 2026
14:00

Vietnam	0–2	Uzbekistan
	Report	Urinboev 5'; Ibraimov 67'

Paloma Mizuho Rugby Stadium, Nagoya
Attendance: 4,134
Referee: Meder Taichiev (Kyrgyzstan)
22 September 2026
14:00

Philippines	2–1	Kuwait
Rublico 19'; Aldeguer 90+1' (pen.)	Report	Woods 66' (o.g.)

CS Asset Minato Soccer Stadium, Nagoya
Attendance: 682
Referee: Songkran Bunmeekiart (Thailand)

=== Group D ===
Pos	Team	Pld	W	D	L	GF	GA	GD	Pts	Qualification
1	South Korea	2	2	0	0	6	1	+5	6	Advance to knockout stage
2	Saudi Arabia	2	1	0	1	2	2	0	3	Advance to knockout stage
3	Qatar	2	0	0	2	1	6	−5	0	

Source: Aichi–Nagoya 26
15 September 2026
19:30

Qatar	1–4	South Korea
Sherif 85'	Report	Eom Ji-sung 7', 20', 45+1'; Kim Myung-jun 66'

Paloma Mizuho Rugby Stadium, Nagoya
Attendance: 1,633
Referee: Adam Kersey (Australia)

18 September 2026
19:30

Saudi Arabia	2–0	Qatar
Barnawi 38'; Houssa 47'	Report

Paloma Mizuho Rugby Stadium, Nagoya
Attendance: 1,214
Referee: Sultan Al-Hammadi (United Arab Emirates)

22 September 2026
19:00

South Korea	2–0	Saudi Arabia
Shin Min-ha 67'; Kim Myung-jun 69'	Report

Paloma Mizuho Rugby Stadium, Nagoya
Attendance: 1,042
Referee: Hiroki Kasahara (Japan)

== Knockout stage ==
All times are local, Japan Standard Time (UTC+9).

=== Bracket ===
Quarter-finals
25 September – Nagoya
South Korea	4
Vietnam	0
26 September – Toyota
China	3
Thailand	0
25 September – Nagoya
Uzbekistan	3
Saudi Arabia	0
26 September – Toyota
Japan	1
North Korea	0

Semi-finals
30 September – Osaka
South Korea	2
China	1
30 September – Osaka
Uzbekistan	1 (8)
Japan (p)	1 (9)

Gold medal match
3 October – Toyota
South Korea	1
Japan	0
Bronze medal match
3 October – Toyota
China	2 (4)
Uzbekistan	2 (3)

=== Quarter-finals ===
25 September 2026
14:00

Uzbekistan	3–0	Saudi Arabia
Murtazaev 12'; Tulkenbekov 79'; Abdurakhmonov 86'	Report

Paloma Mizuho Rugby Stadium, Nagoya
Attendance: 1,308
Referee: Tuan Yaasin (Malaysia)
25 September 2026
19:30

South Korea	4–0	Vietnam
Lee Young-jun 15', 81'; Kim Ji-soo 77'; Kim Myung-jun 88'	Report

Paloma Mizuho Rugby Stadium, Nagoya
Attendance: 2,167
Referee: Firdavs Nosafarov (Uzbekistan)
26 September 2026
15:00

China	3–0	Thailand
Sangtong 45+2' (o.g.); Hu Hetao 47'; Zhang Yuning 63'	Report

Toyota Stadium, Toyota
Attendance: 7,587
Referee: Hiroki Kasahara (Japan)
26 September 2026
19:30

Japan	1–0	North Korea
Nwadike 39'	Report

Toyota Stadium, Toyota
Attendance: 18,912
Referee: Hanna Hattab (Syria)

=== Semi-finals ===
30 September 2026
15:00

South Korea	2–1	China
Lee Young-jun 33'; Bae Jun-ho 82'	Report	Wang Yudong 22'

Nagai Stadium, Osaka
Attendance: 4,470
Referee: Sadullo Gulmurodi (Tajikistan)
30 September 2026
19:30

Uzbekistan	1–1 (a.e.t.)	Japan
Bakhromov 8'	Report	Ishibashi 88'
Penalties
Bakhromov (penalty scored); Tulkinbekov (penalty missed); Murtazaev (penalty scored); Reimov (penalty scored); Shodiboev (penalty scored); Rizakulov (penalty scored); Fayzullaev (penalty scored); Khamidov (penalty scored); Ibraimov (penalty scored); Khushvaktov (penalty missed)	8–9	(penalty scored) Nakajima; (penalty scored) Ozeki; (penalty scored) Ishiwatari; (penalty missed) Nwadike; (penalty scored) Tsuchiya; (penalty scored) Shimamoto; (penalty scored) Yokoyama; (penalty scored) Umeki; (penalty scored) Nagano; (penalty scored) Kosugi

Nagai Stadium, Osaka
Attendance: 15,550
Referee: Abdulhadi Al-Ruaile (Qatar)

=== Bronze medal match ===
3 October 2026
15:00

(bronze) China	2–2	Uzbekistan
Hu Hetao 15'; Wang Yudong 53'	Report	Bakhromov 42'; Shodiboev 89'
Penalties
Liu Haofan (penalty missed); Zhu Chenjie (penalty scored); Xiang Yuwang (penalty scored); Imran Memet (penalty scored); Peng Xiao (penalty scored)	4–3	(penalty missed) Reimov; (penalty scored) Murtazaev; (penalty missed) Shodiboev; (penalty scored) Ormonjonov; (penalty scored) Bakhromov

Toyota Stadium, Toyota
Attendance: 13,770
Referee: Tuan Yaasin (Malaysia)

=== Gold medal match ===
3 October 2026
19:30

(gold) South Korea	1–0	Japan (silver)
Eom Ji-sung 61'	Report

Toyota Stadium, Toyota
Attendance: 30,086
Referee: Adam Kersey (Australia)

== Final standing ==
As per statistical convention in football, matches decided in extra time are counted as wins and losses, while matches decided by penalty shoot-outs are counted as draws.

Standings:

Pos	Team	Pld	W	D	L	GF	GA	GD	Pts	Final result
1	South Korea	5	5	0	0	13	2	+11	15	Gold medal
2	Japan	6	4	1	1	14	2	+12	13	Silver medal
3	China	6	2	3	1	8	5	+3	9	Bronze medal
4	Uzbekistan	6	4	2	0	15	4	+11	14	Fourth place
5	North Korea	4	1	1	2	5	4	+1	4	Eliminated in quarter-finals
6	Saudi Arabia	3	1	0	2	2	5	−3	3	Eliminated in quarter-finals
7	Thailand	4	2	0	2	8	9	−1	6	Eliminated in quarter-finals
8	Vietnam	4	1	1	2	3	7	−4	4	Eliminated in quarter-finals
9	Iran	3	1	1	1	4	5	−1	4	Eliminated in group stage
10	Qatar	2	0	0	2	1	6	−5	0	Eliminated in group stage
11	Philippines	3	1	0	2	3	8	−5	3	Eliminated in group stage
12	Kyrgyzstan	3	1	0	2	6	10	−4	3	Eliminated in group stage
13	United Arab Emirates	3	0	2	1	1	3	−2	2	Eliminated in group stage
14	Kuwait	3	0	1	2	2	5	−3	1	Eliminated in group stage
15	Hong Kong	3	0	0	3	1	11	−10	0	Eliminated in group stage

== Goalscorers ==
There have been 86 goals scored in 29 matches, for an average of 2.97 goals per match.

4 goals

- (South Korea) Eom Ji-sung
- (Uzbekistan) Sardorbek Bakhromov

3 goals

- (Japan) Hisatsugu Ishii
- (South Korea) Lee Young-jun
- (South Korea) Kim Myung-jun
- (Thailand) Paripan Wongsa

2 goals

- (China) Hu Hetao
- (China) Wang Yudong
- (China) Zhang Yuning
- (Japan) Shuto Nagano
- (Japan) Yudai Shimamoto
- (Japan) Yotaro Nakajima
- (North Korea) Choe Kuk
- (North Korea) Ra Myong-song
- (Thailand) Jehhanafee Mamah
- (Uzbekistan) Mukhammadali Urinboev
- (Uzbekistan) Saidumarkhon Saidnurullaev

1 goal

- (China) Wu Xi
- (Hong Kong) Wu Chun Ming
- (Iran) Amirhossein Hosseinzadeh
- (Iran) Pouria Shahrabadi
- (Iran) Yousef Mazraeh
- (Japan) Brian Nwadike
- (Japan) Keita Kosugi
- (Japan) Sena Ishibashi
- (Japan) Yuto Ozeki
- (Japan) Yumeki Yokoyama
- (Philippines) Andres Aldeguer
- (Philippines) Josh Meriño
- (Philippines) Santiago Rublico
- (North Korea) Paek Chung-song
- (Qatar) Marwan Sherif
- (South Korea) Bae Jun-ho
- (South Korea) Kim Ji-soo
- (South Korea) Shin Min-ha
- (Saudi Arabia) Mohammed Barnawi
- (Saudi Arabia) Eyad Houssa
- (Kuwait) Omar Al-Matar
- (Kyrgyzstan) Aitenir Balbakov
- (Kyrgyzstan) Daniel Omarov
- (Kyrgyzstan) Erbol Abduzhaparov
- (Kyrgyzstan) Kuduret Iskandarbekov
- (Kyrgyzstan) Sardorbek Nematov
- (Kyrgyzstan) Yryskeldi Madanov
- (Thailand) Thanakrit Chotmuangpak
- (Thailand) Worawut Noisri
- (United Arab Emirates) Mackenzie Hunt
- (Uzbekistan) Azizbek Tulkunbekov
- (Uzbekistan) Dilshod Murtazaev
- (Uzbekistan) Ruziboy Fayzullaev
- (Uzbekistan) Shodiyor Shodiboev
- (Uzbekistan) Firdavs Abdurakhmonov
- (Uzbekistan) Mukhammadali Reimov
- (Uzbekistan) Nurlan Ibraimov
- (Vietnam) Nguyễn Ngọc Mỹ
- (Vietnam) Nguyễn Thanh Nhàn
- (Vietnam) Nguyễn Lê Phát

1 own goal

- (United Arab Emirates) Junior Ndiaye (against Iran)
- (Hong Kong) Tsang Yi Hang (against Thailand)
- (Philippines) Scott Woods (against Kuwait)
- (Thailand) Auttapon Sangtong (against China)

== See also ==
- Football at the 2026 Asian Games – Women's tournament
