= Samandar Muratbaev =

Uzbekistani footballer

Personal information
- Full name: Samandar Saparzhanovich Muratbaev
- Date of birth: 3 March 2005 (age 21)
- Place of birth: Uzbekistan
- Height: 1.93 m (6 ft 4 in)
- Position: Goalkeeper

Team information
- Current team: Nasaf Qarshi
- Number: 21

Senior career*
Years	Team	Apps	(Gls)
2024	Metallurg Bekabad	4	(0)
2024-2026	Olympic MobiUz	48	(0)
2026-	Nasaf Qarshi	7	(0)

International career^{‡}
2024-	Uzbekistan U23	17	(0)
- * Club domestic league appearances and goals as of 23 September 2026 ‡ National team caps and goals as of 23 September 2026

Samandar Saparzhanovich Muratbaev (Uzbek: Самандар Сапаржанович Муратбаев; born 3 March 2005) is an Uzbek professional footballer who plays as a goalkeeper for Uzbekistan Super League club Nasaf Qarshi and the Uzbekistan national under-23 team.

== Club career ==
Began his career in Metallurg Bekabad. In the end of 2024 season played for Olympic MobiUz. Muratbaev made his move to Uzbekistan Super League contenders Nasaf Qarshi on 26 January 2026, signing a contract through the end of December 2026. Standing at 1.93 m (6 ft 4 in), he functions as part of the club's goalkeeper department for domestic and continental competitions.

== International career ==
Muratbaev represents Uzbekistan at youth international level, having received call-ups and playing time with the Uzbekistan U23 national team.

In September 2026, Muratbaev was named to Uzbekistan U23's squad for the 2026 Asian Games tournament. He featured as the starting goalkeeper in group stage victories against the Philippines U23 (5–1) on 15 September and kept a clean sheet in a 2–0 victory over Kuwait U23 on 18 September 2026.
