= Bunyodbek Rakhimov =

Uzbekistani footballer

Personal information
- Full name: Bunyodbek Rahimov
- Date of birth: 27 April 2005 (age 21)
- Place of birth: Namangan, Uzbekistan
- Height: 1.73 m (5 ft 8 in)
- Position: Central midfielder

Team information
- Current team: Olimpik-Mobiuz
- Number: 6

Senior career*
Years	Team	Apps	(Gls)
2023—2024	Navbahor	59	(8)
2024—	Olimpik-Mobiuz	26	(0)

International career^{‡}
2025—	Uzbekistan U23	19	(1)
- * Club domestic league appearances and goals as of 27 September 2026 ‡ National team caps and goals as of 27 September 2026

Bunyodbek Rakhimov (Uzbek: Бунёдбек Раҳимов; born 27 April 2005) is an Uzbek professional footballer who plays as a central midfielder for Uzbekistan Pro League club Olimpik-Mobiuz and Uzbekistan national under-23 team.

== Club career ==
Rakhimov plays for Olimpik-Mobiuz, a developmental squad operating within the Uzbekistan Pro League designed to nurture young talent for the Uzbekistan national youth setup. Functioning primarily as a central midfielder, he utilizes his 1.73 m (5 ft 8 in) frame to distribute the ball and control the tempo of the game.

== International career ==
Rakhimov has progressed through the youth ranks of the Uzbekistan national team system. He earned selection to the Uzbekistan U23 squad, representing the nation in youth and regional tournaments.

In September 2026, Rakhimov was officially named to the Uzbekistan Olympic squad competing in the 2026 Asian Games. He joined the team for their group stage fixtures as part of the country's youth football delegation aiming for medal contention in the pan-Asian tournament.
