= Wrestling at the 2026 Asian Games – Women's freestyle 76 kg =

Women's freestyle 76 kg at the 2026 Asian Games
- Venue: Inae Sports Center
- Date: 2 October 2026
- Competitors: 10 from 10 nations

Medalists
gold medal	Yuka Kagami	Japan
silver medal	Elmira Syzdykova	Kazakhstan
bronze medal	Aiperi Medet Kyzy	Kyrgyzstan
bronze medal	Li Wenji	China

The women's freestyle 76 kilograms wrestling competition at the 2026 Asian Games in Nagoya was held on 2 October 2026 at the Inae Sports Center.

This freestyle wrestling competition consists of a single-elimination tournament, with a repechage used to determine the winner of two bronze medals. The two finalists face off for gold and silver medals. Each wrestler who loses to one of the two finalists moves into the repechage, culminating in a pair of bronze medal matches featuring the semifinal losers each facing the remaining repechage opponent from their half of the bracket.

== Schedule ==
All times are Japan Standard Time (UTC+09:00)

Date	Time	Event
Friday, 2 October 2026	10:30	1/8 finals
Friday, 2 October 2026	10:30	1/4 finals
Friday, 2 October 2026	10:30	Semifinals
Friday, 2 October 2026	18:00	Finals

== Results ==
Legend

- F — Won by fall

=== Main bracket ===
1/8 finals
Aiperi Medet Kyzy (KGZ)	6^{F}
Priya Malik (IND)	1
Chang Hui-tsz (TPE)	2
Enkh-Amaryn Davaanasan (MGL)	4

1/4 finals
Varadisa Septi (INA)	0
Aiperi Medet Kyzy (KGZ)	10
Sevinchoy Polvonova (UZB)	0
Yuka Kagami (JPN)	10
Li Wenji (CHN)	10
Hwang Eun-ju (KOR)	0
Enkh-Amaryn Davaanasan (MGL)	1
Elmira Syzdykova (KAZ)	4^{F}

Semifinals
Aiperi Medet Kyzy (KGZ)	3
Yuka Kagami (JPN)	5
Li Wenji (CHN)	8
Elmira Syzdykova (KAZ)	9

Final
Yuka Kagami (JPN)	5
Elmira Syzdykova (KAZ)	1

=== Repechage ===
Bronze medal matches
Sevinchoy Polvonova (UZB)	0
Aiperi Medet Kyzy (KGZ)	10
Enkh-Amaryn Davaanasan (MGL)	1
Li Wenji (CHN)	5

== Final standing ==
Rank	Athlete
1st place, gold medalist(s)	Yuka Kagami (JPN)
2nd place, silver medalist(s)	Elmira Syzdykova (KAZ)
3rd place, bronze medalist(s)	Aiperi Medet Kyzy (KGZ)
3rd place, bronze medalist(s)	Li Wenji (CHN)
5	Sevinchoy Polvonova (UZB)
5	Enkh-Amaryn Davaanasan (MGL)
7	Chang Hui-tsz (TPE)
8	Priya Malik (IND)
9	Varadisa Septi (INA)
10	Hwang Eun-ju (KOR)
