= Santiago Rublico =

Filipino footballer (born 2005)

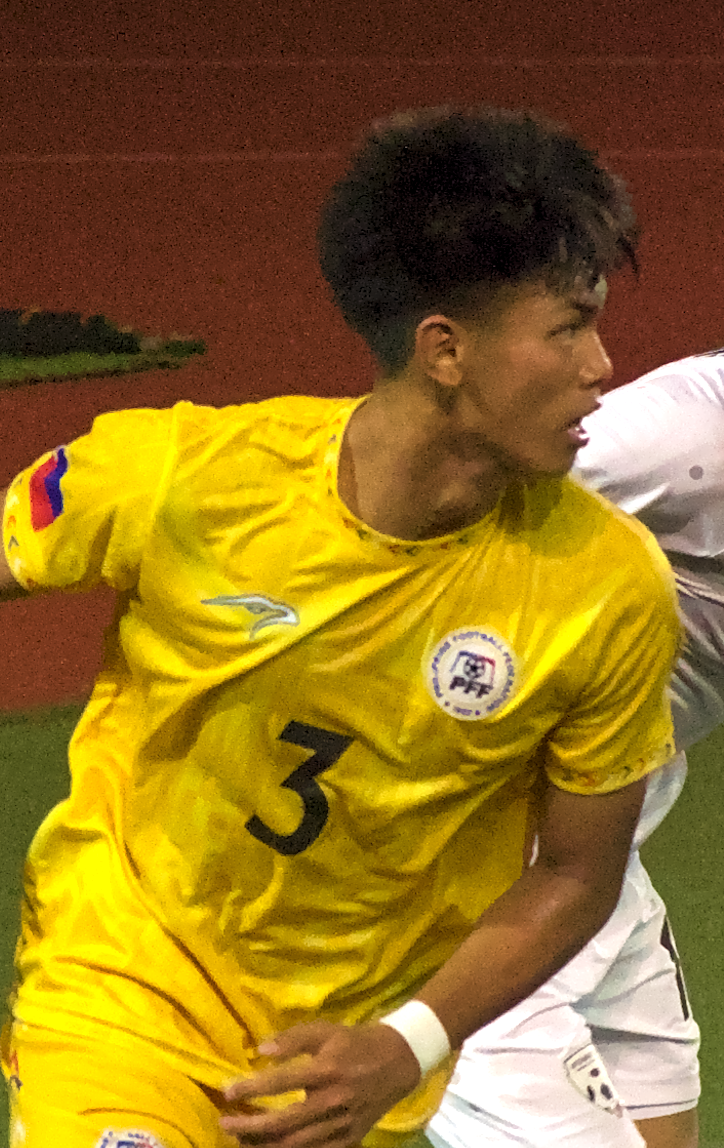
- Rublico playing for Philippines in 2023

Personal information
- Full name: Santiago Rublico Colminas (Note: In this Spanish name, the first or paternal surname is Rublico and the second or maternal family name is Colminas.)
- Date of birth: August 16, 2005 (age 21)
- Place of birth: Madrid, Spain
- Height: 1.76 m (5 ft 9 in)
- Positions: Right-back; right winger

Team information
- Current team: Alcorcón B
- Number: 21

Youth career
- 2011–2017: Atlético Madrid
- 2017–2022: Rayo Vallecano
- 2022–2024: Atlético Madrid

Senior career*
Years	Team	Apps	(Gls)
2024–2025	Collado Villalba	28	(0)
2025–	Alcorcón B	23	(0)

International career^{‡}
2023–2025	Philippines U22	8	(0)
2025–	Philippines U23	6	(1)
2023–	Philippines	19	(1)
- * Club domestic league appearances and goals as of May 10, 2026 ‡ National team caps and goals as of September 22, 2026

Santiago Rublico Colminas (born August 16, 2005) is a professional footballer who plays as a right-back or right winger for Primera Autonómica de Aficionados – Group 2 team Alcorcón B. Born in Spain, he plays for the Philippines national team.

== Club career ==
=== Youth ===
Rublico joined the youth academy of Atlético Madrid at the age of six after he was spotted playing in a park by a youth team coach of the club. He moved to Rayo Vallecano in 2017 and spent five years there playing for different youth teams. On September 15, 2022, Atlético Madrid announced the return of Rublico to the club. He made four appearances for the club during the 2023–24 UEFA Youth League.

=== Collado Villalba ===
In July 2024, Rublico signed his first professional contract with Tercera Federación club Collado Villalba.

== International career ==
=== Youth ===
In April 2023, Rublico was named in the Philippines under-22 squad for the 2023 SEA Games. He made his tournament debut on April 29 in a 3–0 loss against Indonesia. In December 2025, he was named in the squad for the 2025 SEA Games. In September 2026, he was included in the Philippines under-23 squad for the 2026 Asian Games.

=== Senior ===
Rublico received his first call-up to the Philippines national team in March 2023 for friendlies against Kuwait and Jordan. He made his debut on March 25, 2023, in a 2–0 defeat to Kuwait. On June 3, 2026, he scored his first international goal in the 44th minute in a 5–1 win against Guam.

== Personal life ==
Rublico was born in Spain to Filipino parents, which made him eligible to represent both Spain and Philippines in international football. He considers Dani Alves and Sergiño Dest as his references when it comes to his playing position. He is also a fan of former Atlético Madrid player Diego Ribas.

== Career statistics ==
=== Club ===
As of match played May 10, 2026

Appearances and goals by club, season and competition
Club	Season	League			Cup		Europe		Other		Total	
Club	Season	Division	Apps	Goals	Apps	Goals	Apps	Goals	Apps	Goals	Apps	Goals
Collado Villalba	2024–25	Tercera Federación	28	0	—		—		—		28	0
Alcorcón B	2025–26	Tercera Federación	23	0	—		—		—		23	0
Alcorcón B	2026–27	Tercera Federación	0	0	—		—		—		0	0
Alcorcón B	Total		51	0	—		—		—		51	0
Career total			51	0	0	0	0	0	0	0	51	0

=== International ===
As of match played August 1, 2026

Appearances and goals by national team and year
National team	Year	Apps	Goals
Philippines	2023	6	0
Philippines	2024	7	0
Philippines	2025	2	0
Philippines	2026	4	1
Total		19	1

Scores and results list Philippines' goal tally first, score column indicates score after each Rublico goal.

List of international goals scored by Santiago Rublico
No.	Date	Venue	Opponent	Score	Result	Competition
1	June 3, 2026	Rizal Memorial Stadium, Manila, Philippines	Guam	3–0	5–1	Friendly
