= Ruziboy Fayzullaev =

Uzbek footballer

Personal information
- Full name: Roʻziboy Bahodir oʻgʻli Fayzullayev
- Date of birth: 16 October 2005 (age 21)
- Place of birth: Uzbekistan
- Height: 1.72 m (5 ft 8 in)
- Position: Right-back

Team information
- Current team: Olimpik-Mobiuz
- Number: 27

Senior career*
Years	Team	Apps	(Gls)
2023–2024	Metallurg	26	(0)
2024–	Olimpik-Mobiuz	50	(2)

International career^{‡}
2024–	Uzbekistan U23	10	(1)
- * Club domestic league appearances and goals as of 22 September 2026 ‡ National team caps and goals as of 22 September 2026

Ruziboy Fayzullaev (Uzbek: Рўзибой Баҳодир ўғли Файзуллаев; born 16 October 2005) is an Uzbek professional footballer who plays as a right-back for Uzbekistan Pro League club Olimpik-Mobiuz and the Uzbekistan national under-23 team.

== Club career ==
Fayzullaev began his professional career in Uzbekistan, joining Olimpik-Mobiuz (the developmental squad created to nurture young talents for Uzbek national youth teams). Operating primarily as a right-sided defender, he established himself in the squad competing in the Uzbekistan Pro League.

== International career ==
Fayzullaev has represented Uzbekistan at youth international levels, earning caps for the Uzbekistan U23 team. In September 2026, Fayzullaev featured for the Uzbekistan Olympic team during their group stage fixtures at the Asian Games, including victories over the Philippines (5–1), Kuwait (2–0) and Vietnam (2–0).
