= Andres Aldeguer =

Filipino footballer (born 2003)

Personal information
- Full name: Andres Rafael Teves Aldeguer
- Date of birth: December 18, 2003 (age 22)
- Place of birth: Muntinlupa, Philippines
- Height: 1.89 m (6 ft 2 in)
- Position: Striker

Team information
- Current team: One Taguig
- Number: 9

Youth career
- Loyola
- Makati
- 2019–2022: De La Salle Zobel School

College career
Years	Team	Apps	(Gls)
2023–2024	Central Connecticut Blue Devils		

Senior career*
Years	Team	Apps	(Gls)
2022–2023	Azkals Development Team	13	(5)
2024–	One Taguig	44	(18)

International career^{‡}
2022	Philippines U19	6	(3)
2022	Philippines U20	9	(3)
2022	Philippines U22	4	(0)
2022–	Philippines U23	13	(2)
2026–	Philippines	2	(0)
- * Club domestic league appearances and goals as of 20 May 2026 ‡ National team caps and goals as of 22 September 2026

Andres Rafael Teves Aldeguer (born December 18, 2003) is a Filipino professional footballer who plays as a striker for Philippines Football League club One Taguig and the Philippines national team.

== Career ==
After graduating high school at De La Salle Zobel, Aldeguer began his senior career at Philippines Football League side Azkals Development Team. In the 2022–23 season, he was the leading scorer of the team, netting 6 goals.

In July 2023, Aldeguer joined American college soccer side Central Connecticut Blue Devils.

In 2024, Aldeguer returned to the Philippines and joined newly created club One Taguig.

== International career ==
=== Philippines U-23 ===
In February 2022, Aldeguer was named in Philippines U23 squad for the 2022 AFF U-23 Championship held in Cambodia. He was the only player in the team that plays for a high school team.

In April 2023, Aldeguer once again called up to the Philippines U23 team, competing in the 2023 SEA Games. He was later part of the national team which took part at the 2026 Asian Games in Aichi and Nagoya, Japan. He converted the winning penalty in the Philippines 2–1 win against Kuwait, the national team's first victory in the continental games in 68 years.

=== Senior ===
In March 2024, Aldeguer received his first call up to the Philippines national team for the 2026 World Cup qualification games against Iraq.

== Personal life ==
Andres Aldeguer is the son of former basketball player Dino Aldeguer, who also attended De La Salle Zobel School. George Aldeguer, Andres' great-granduncle, was also a footballer and a scorer for the Philippine national team in the 1958 Asian Games.

== Career statistics ==
=== International ===
As of match played 4 August 2026

Appearances and goals by national team and year
National team	Year	Apps	Goals
Philippines	2026	2	0
Total		2	0
