= Sardorbek Bakhromov =

Uzbekistani footballer

- Sardorbek Bakhromov with Nasaf, 2025

Personal information
- Date of birth: 16 February 2005 (age 21)
- Place of birth: Qashqadaryo Region, Uzbekistan
- Height: 1.85 m (6 ft 1 in)
- Positions: Left winger; midfielder

Team information
- Current team: Nasaf Qarshi
- Number: 6

Youth career
- –2023: Nasaf U18

Senior career*
Years	Team	Apps	(Gls)
2023–	Nasaf	83	(15)

International career^{‡}
2024–	Uzbekistan U21	7	(1)
2025–	Uzbekistan U23	14	(6)
- * Club domestic league appearances and goals as of 30 September 2026 ‡ National team caps and goals as of 2 October 2026

Sardorbek Bakhromov (Uzbek: Сардорбек Баҳромов; born 16 February 2005) is an Uzbek professional footballer who plays as a left winger for Uzbekistan Super League club Nasaf and Uzbekistan national under-23 team.

In 2026, AFC experts highly rated the game of Bakhromov, recognizing him as one of the brightest discoveries of the season.

== Club career ==
Bakhromov progressed through Nasaf youth academy, initially playing for the U18 and reserve squads. He was promoted to the first team and officially joined the senior squad in early 2025, securing a contract running through December 2027. Operating as a 1.85 m (6 ft 1 in) left-sided attacker, he has continued his professional development within the domestic league structure, also representing Nasaf in AFC Champions League.

== International career ==
Bakhromov has progressed through the youth ranks of the Uzbekistan national team system. In 2024 and 2025, he logged appearances for Uzbekistan U21 and U23 squads.

In September 2026, Bakhromov was called up to the Uzbekistan Olympic squad to participate in the 2026 Asian Games. He featured in the group stage fixtures in Group C, assisting Uzbekistan in securing victories during their tournament run, including wins against the Philippines (5–1), Kuwait (2–0) and Vietnam (2–0). Lost to Japan in a penalty shootout and failed to reach the final.

== Honours ==
Individual

- Asian Games top goalscorer: 2026
