= Giyosjon Rizakulov =

Uzbekistani footballer

- Giyosjon Rizakulov with Uzbekistan U23 team, 2026

Personal information
- Full name: Giyosjon Ixtiyor oʻgʻli Rizoqulov
- Date of birth: 20 February 2005 (age 21)
- Place of birth: Uzbekistan
- Height: 1.85 m (6 ft 1 in)
- Position: Right-back

Team information
- Current team: Qizilqum
- Number: 5

Youth career
- —2024: Qizilqum U21

Senior career*
Years	Team	Apps	(Gls)
2024—	Qizilqum	48	(2)
2025—	→ Olimpik-Mobiuz (loan)	48	(2)

International career^{‡}
2026—	Uzbekistan U23	8	(0)
- * Club domestic league appearances and goals as of 2 October 2026 ‡ National team caps and goals as of 2 October 2026

Giyosjon Ikhtiyor oʻgʻli Rizakulov (Uzbek: Ғиёсжон Ихтиёр ўғли Ризақулов; born 20 February 2005) is an Uzbek professional footballer who plays as a right-back for Uzbekistan Super League club Qizilqum and the Uzbekistan national under-23 team.

== Club career ==
Rizakulov developed through the youth system of Qizilqum. He was promoted to the senior squad in late 2024 and subsequently spent the 2025 season on loan with developmental side Olimpik-Mobiuz. Following the conclusion of his loan, he returned to Qizilqum for the 2026 Uzbekistan Super League season, establishing himself as a regular contributor in domestic competition.

== International career ==
Rizakulov represents Uzbekistan at the youth international level. Standing at 1.85 m (6 ft 1 in), the defender is a current member of the Uzbekistan U23 squad.

In January 2026, Rizakulov was selected in Uzbekistan's squad for the 2026 AFC U-23 Asian Cup held in Saudi Arabia. Uzbekistan topped Group C undefeated with 7 points, claiming victories against Lebanon U23 (3-2) and South Korea U23 (2-0), along with a 0-0 draw against Iran U23. In the quarter-finals, Uzbekistan drew 0-0 after extra time against China PR U23 before being eliminated 2-4 in a penalty shootout.

In September 2026, Rizakulov was selected to represent the Uzbekistan Olympic team at the 2026 Asian Games. He participated in the team's successful Group C campaign, which included convincing victories over the Philippines (5-1), Kuwait (2-0), and Vietnam (2-0). The squad advanced through the quarter-finals with a 3-0 win over Saudi Arabia before narrowly falling 9-10 in a penalty shootout against Japan in the semi-finals on 30 September. Rizakulov and his teammates are scheduled to face China in the bronze medal match on 2 October 2026.
