= Toyota Stadium (Japan) =

Stadium in Toyota, Aichi Prefecture, Japan

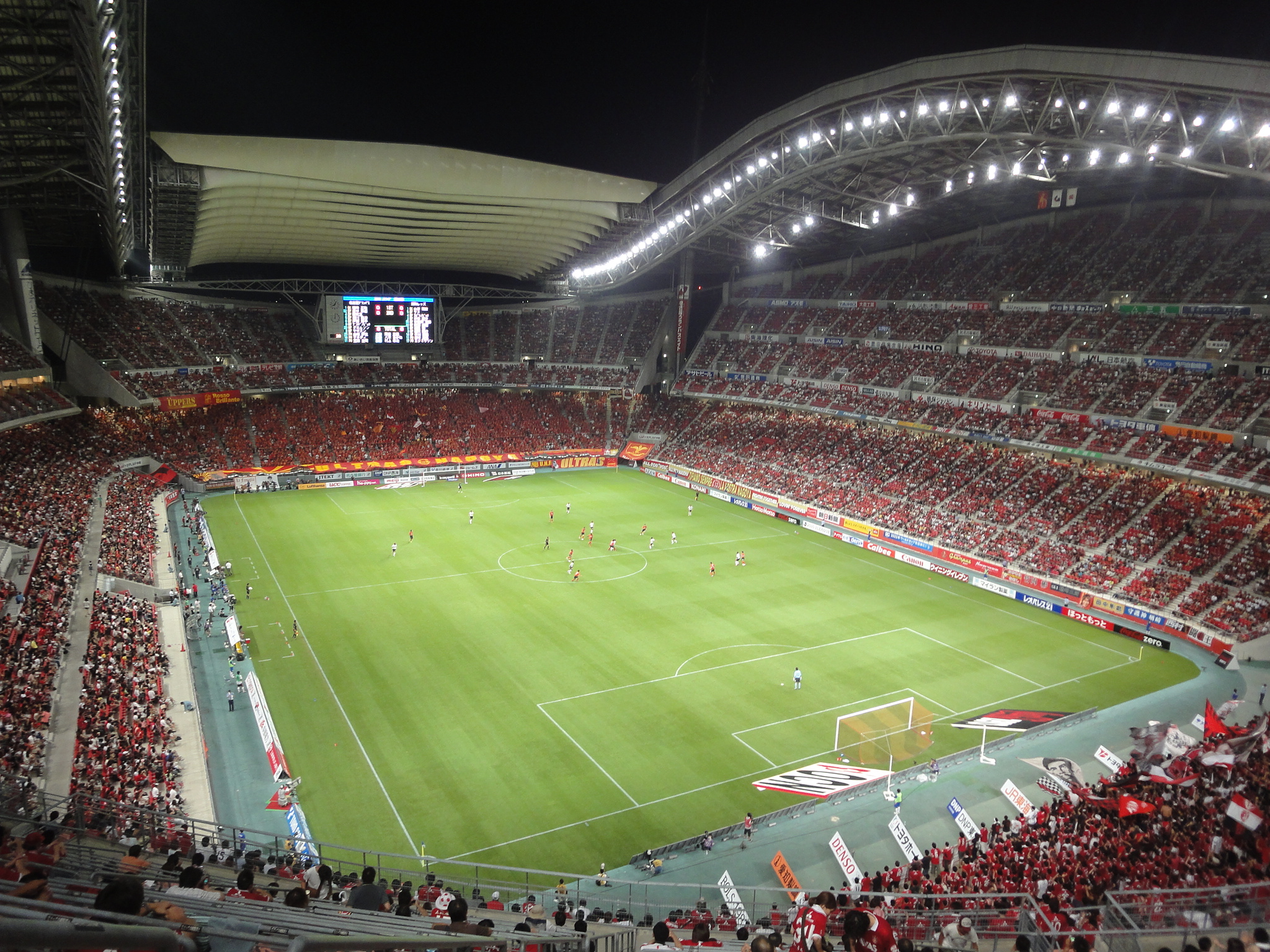
- Interactive map of Toyota Stadium
- Location: Toyota, Aichi, Japan
- Coordinates: 35°05′04″N 137°10′15″E
- Owner: Toyota City
- Operator: Toyota Stadium Corporation
- Capacity: 45,000
- Roof: Retractable
- Surface: Grass
- Record attendance: 43,579 (Nagoya Grampus vs Kashima Antlers, 11 August 2018)
- Field size: 115 x 78 m
- Public transit: Meitetsu: Toyota Line at Toyotashi; Aichi Loop Line: at Shin-Toyota

Construction
- Groundbreaking: 1997
- Opened: July 21, 2001
- Architect: Kisho Kurokawa

Tenants
- Nagoya Grampus; Toyota Verblitz; Japan national football team (select matches): Major sporting events hosted; Kirin Cup Soccer; 2019 Rugby World Cup; 2026 Asian Games football

Toyota Stadium (豊田スタジアム, Toyota Sutajiamu) is a stadium in Toyota, Aichi Prefecture, Japan. It has a retractable roof.

== History ==
It was built in 2001 and is often used as home to the J1 League club Nagoya Grampus. The stadium is football-specific, which gives matches an authentic football aura; however, its location outside Nagoya city makes it impractical for consolidating the club's fan base in its billed hometown.

It is also used by Toyota Verblitz, a rugby union team in the Japan Rugby League One.

Its roof is unique in that it folds much like an accordion; however, the roof has never been closed since 2015 due to extra costs for maintenance.

Toyota Stadium is one of the venues of the FIFA Club World Cup (formerly the Toyota Cup). The stadium was also used as one of the venues for 2019 Rugby World Cup, the first Rugby World Cup to be held in Asia. During the Rugby World Cup, the stadium was referred to as "City of Toyota Stadium" due to concerns under ambush marketing rules that the stadium's name could be interpreted as naming rights by car manufacturer Toyota (while the city is named after the company due to it being the location of its headquarters, Toyota does not sponsor the stadium).

== Football international matches ==
=== Men's ===
Date	Team 1	Score	Team 2	Competition	Attendance
24 May 2005	United Arab Emirates	0–0	Peru	2005 Kirin Cup	6,536
24 May 2008	Japan	1–0	Ivory Coast	2008 Kirin Cup	40,701
03 March 2010	Japan	2–0	Bahrain	2011 AFC Asian Cup qualification	38,042
29 February 2012	Japan	0–1	Uzbekistan	2014 FIFA World Cup qualification	42,720
30 May 2013	Japan	0–2	Bulgaria	2013 Kirin Cup	41,353
14 November 2014	Japan	6–0	Honduras	2014 Kirin Cup	42,126
3 June 2016	Bosnia and Herzegovina	2–2 (4–3 p)	Denmark	2016 Kirin Cup	4,500
3 June 2016	Japan	7–2	Bulgaria	2016 Kirin Cup	41,940
6 October 2017	Japan	2–1	New Zealand	2017 Kirin Cup	38,461
20 November 2018	Japan	4–0	Kyrgyzstan	2018 Kirin Cup	38,353
5 June 2019	Japan	0–0	Trinidad and Tobago	2019 Kirin Cup	38,507
15 November 2025	Japan	2–0	Ghana	2025 Kirin Cup	40,030

=== Men's U23 ===
Date	Team 1	Score	Team 2	Competition	Attendance
19 June 2011	Japan	2–0	Kuwait	2012 Summer Olympics qualification	17,873
16 September 2026	Thailand	3–2	Kyrgyzstan	2026 Asian Games Group A	2,563
16 September 2026	Japan	2–0	Hong Kong	2026 Asian Games Group A	7,720
20 September 2026	Hong Kong	1–5	Thailand	2026 Asian Games Group A	10,439
20 September 2026	Kyrgyzstan	0–7	Japan	2026 Asian Games Group A	19,205
23 September 2026	China	0–0	United Arab Emirates	2026 Asian Games Group B	7,501
23 September 2026	Japan	3–0	Thailand	2026 Asian Games Group A	18,408
25 September 2026	China	3–0	Thailand	2026 Asian Games Quarter-finals	7,587
26 September 2026	Japan	1–0	North Korea	2026 Asian Games Quarter-finals	18,912
3 October 2026	China	2–2 (a.e.t.) (4–3 p)	Uzbekistan	2026 Asian Games Bronze medal match	13,770
3 October 2026	South Korea	1–0	Japan	2026 Asian Games Gold medal match	30,086

== 2019 Rugby World Cup matches ==
Date	Time (JST)	Team #1	Result	Team #2	Round	Attendance
23 September 2019	19:15	Wales	43–14	Georgia	Pool D	35,546
28 September 2019	18:45	South Africa	57–3	Namibia	Pool B	36,449
5 October 2019	19:30	Japan	38–19	Samoa	Pool A	39,695
12 October 2019	13:45	New Zealand	0-0	Italy	Pool B	Match cancelled due to Typhoon Hagibis

== See also ==
- List of sports venues with the name Toyota

Preceded by Huanglong Sports Center; Hangzhou	Asian Games Men's Football tournament Final Venue; 2026	Succeeded by TBD; TBD
