= Saidkhon Khamidov =

Uzbekistani footballer

- Khamidov with Uzbekistan national under-23 team, 2026

Personal information
- Full name: Saidkhon Sardorovich Khamidov
- Date of birth: 20 January 2005 (age 21)
- Place of birth: Tashkent
- Height: 1.78 m (5 ft 10 in)
- Position: Left-back

Team information
- Current team: Olimpik-Mobiuz
- Number: 2

Senior career*
Years	Team	Apps	(Gls)
2024—	Olimpik-Mobiuz	52	(7)

International career^{‡}
2025	Uzbekistan U20	3	(0)
2026—	Uzbekistan U23		
- * Club domestic league appearances and goals as of 27 September 2026 ‡ National team caps and goals as of 27 September 2026

Saidkhon Sardorovich Khamidov (Uzbek: Ҳамидов Саидхон Сардорович; born 20 January 2005) is an Uzbek professional footballer who plays as a left-back for Uzbekistan Pro League club Olimpik-Mobiuz and the Uzbekistan national under-23 team.

== Club career ==
Khamidov formally joined Uzbekistan Pro League developmental club Olimpik-Mobiuz in July 2024, securing a contract running through December 2027. Operating as a 1.78 m (5 ft 10 in) left-sided defender, he has continued his professional development within the domestic league structure.

== International career ==
Khamidov has progressed through the youth ranks of the Uzbekistan national team system. In 2025, he logged appearances for the Uzbekistan U20 squad. In September 2026, Khamidov was called up to the Uzbekistan Olympic squad to participate in the 2026 Asian Games. He featured in the group stage fixtures, assisting Uzbekistan in securing victories during their tournament run.
