= CS Asset Minato Soccer Stadium =

Soccer stadium in Nagoya, Aichi, Japan

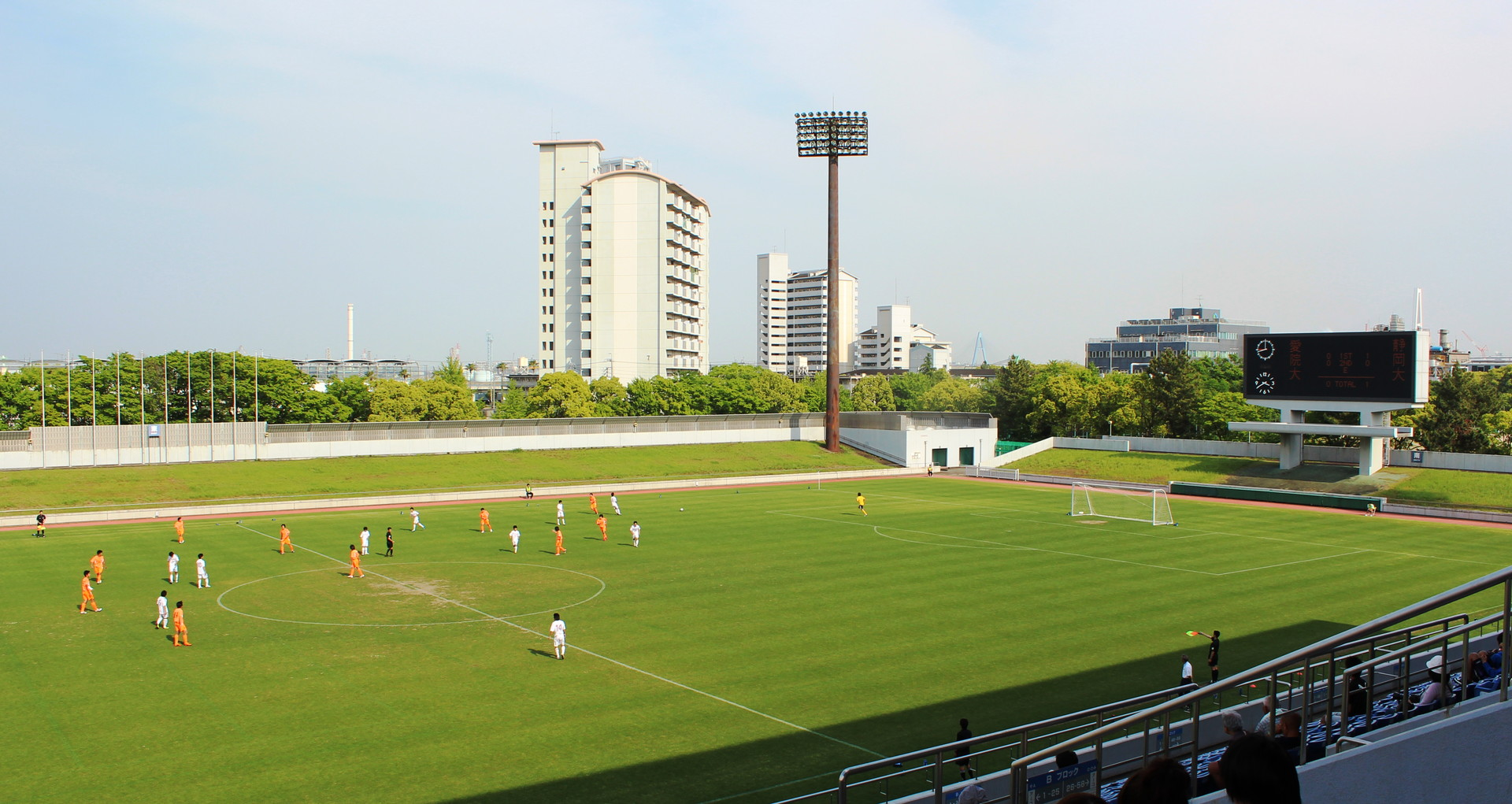
- Interactive map of CS Asset Minato Soccer Stadium
- Location: Nagoya, Aichi, Japan
- Coordinates: 35°4′33.9″N 136°51′2.4″E
- Owner: Nagoya City
- Capacity: 6,700
- Surface: natural grass

Construction
- Opened: 1993

Tenants
- 2026 Asian Games; FC Maruyasu Okazaki

CS Asset Minato Soccer Stadium (CSアセット港サッカー場, CS A-setto Minato Sakkā-ba), formerly known as Nagoya Minato Stadium, is a soccer stadium located in the Minato-ku area of Nagoya, Aichi, Japan. Sports that can be played at the stadium are namely association football, rugby, American football and lacrosse.
