= FC Olympic MobiUz =

Olympic MobiUz
- Full name: Olympic MobiUz Football Club
- Founded: 2023
- Ground: Dustlik Stadium
- Capacity: 5,884
- Owner: NOC of Uzbekistan
- President: Saken Poʻlatov
- Head coach: Farhod Nishonov
- League: Uzbekistan Pro League

Olympic MobiUz is a professional association football club located in Tashkent. The club was formed in 2023. As of 2025, it competes in Pro League competitions.

== History ==
Uzbekistan Football Association and National Olympic Committee by mutual agreement decided to create the Olympic-Farm team at the Olympic football club. The team consists of players born in 2005 and in subsequent years. The team started its activities as a professional club from 2023 in the first league.

The title sponsor of this club is the mobile operator "Mobiuz" in Uzbekistan.
