= 2020 AFC U-23 Championship qualification =

Tournament details
- Host countries: Qatar (Group A); Bahrain (Group B); Iran (Group C); Saudi Arabia (Group D); Kuwait (Group E); Uzbekistan (Group F); Mongolia (Group G); Cambodia (Group H); Myanmar (Group I); Malaysia (Group J); Vietnam (Group K)
- Dates: 22–26 March 2019
- Teams: 43 (from 1 confederation)
- Venues: 13 (in 11 host cities)

Tournament statistics
- Matches played: 63
- Goals scored: 240 (3.81 per match)
- Attendance: 194,470 (3,087 per match)
- Top scorer: (South Korea) Lee Dong-gyeong (6 goals)

The 2020 AFC U-23 Championship qualification was an international men's under-23 football competition which decide the participating teams of the 2020 AFC U-23 Championship.

A total of 16 teams qualified to play in the final tournament, including Thailand who qualified automatically as hosts country. These matches also served as the first stage of the AFC qualifiers for the 2020 Summer Olympics men's football tournament in Japan.

== Draw ==
Of the 47 AFC member associations, a total of 44 teams entered the competition. The final tournament hosts Thailand decided to participate in qualification despite having automatically qualified for the final tournament.

The draw was held on 7 November 2018, 15:00 MYT (UTC+8), at the AFC House in Kuala Lumpur, Malaysia. The 44 teams were drawn into eleven groups of four teams. For the draw, teams were divided into two zones:

- West Zone: 24 teams from West Asia, Central Asia and South Asia, to be drawn into six groups of four teams (Groups A–F).
- East Zone: 20 teams from ASEAN and East Asia, to be drawn into five groups of four teams (Groups G–K).

The teams were seeded according to their performance in the 2018 AFC U-23 Championship final tournament and qualification (overall ranking shown in parentheses; NR stands for non-ranked teams). The following restrictions were also applied:

- The eleven teams which indicated their intention to serve as qualification group hosts prior to the draw were drawn into separate groups.

	Pot 1	Pot 2	Pot 3	Pot 4
West Zone	1. **Uzbekistan** (1) **(H)**; 2. **Qatar** (3) **(H)**; 3. **Iraq** (5); 4. Palestine (6); 5. **Jordan** (12); 6. **Saudi Arabia** (13) **(H)**	7. **Syria** (14); 8. Oman (15); 9. **Iran** (17) **(H)**; 10. **United Arab Emirates** (19); 11. Tajikistan (21); 12. **Bahrain** (26) **(H)**	13. Lebanon (27); 14. India (28); 15. Kyrgyzstan (29); 16. Turkmenistan (31); 17. Nepal (34); 18. Bangladesh (37)	19. Afghanistan (38); 20. Kuwait (NR) **(H)**; 21. Maldives (NR); 22. Pakistan (NR) **(W)**; 23. Sri Lanka (NR); 24. Yemen (NR)
East Zone	1. **Vietnam** (2) **(H)**; 2. **South Korea** (4); 3. Malaysia (7) **(H)**; 4. **Japan** (8); 5. **North Korea** (9)	6. **China** (10); 7. **Australia** (11); 8. **Thailand** (16) **(Q)**; 9. Myanmar (18) **(H)**; 10. Hong Kong (20)	11. Cambodia (22) **(H)**; 12. Indonesia (23); 13. Timor-Leste (24); 14. Laos (25); 15. Singapore (30)	16. Mongolia (32) **(H)**; 17. Brunei (33); 18. Philippines (35); 19. Chinese Taipei (36); 20. Macau (39) **(N)**

Notes

- Teams in **bold** qualified for the final tournament.
- (H): Qualification group hosts
- (N): Not a member of the International Olympic Committee, ineligible for Olympics
- (Q): Final tournament hosts, automatically qualified regardless of qualification results
- (W): Withdrew after draw

Did not enter
West Zone	Bhutan
East Zone	Guam; Northern Mariana Islands **(N)**

== Player eligibility ==
Players born on or after 1 January 1997 are eligible to compete in the tournament.

== Format ==
In each group, teams play each other once at a centralized venue. The eleven group winners and the four best runners-up qualify for the final tournament. If the final tournament hosts Thailand win their group or are among the four best runners-up, the fifth best runner-up also qualifies for the final tournament.

=== Tiebreakers ===
Teams are ranked according to points (3 points for a win, 1 point for a draw, 0 points for a loss), and if tied on points, the following tiebreaking criteria are applied, in the order given, to determine the rankings (Regulations Article 9.3).

1. Points in head-to-head matches among tied teams;
2. Goal difference in head-to-head matches among tied teams;
3. Goals scored in head-to-head matches among tied teams;
4. If more than two teams are tied, and after applying all head-to-head criteria above, a subset of teams are still tied, all head-to-head criteria above are reapplied exclusively to this subset of teams;
5. Goal difference in all group matches;
6. Goals scored in all group matches;
7. Penalty shoot-out if only two teams are tied and they met in the last round of the group;
8. Disciplinary points (yellow card = 1 point, red card as a result of two yellow cards = 3 points, direct red card = 3 points, yellow card followed by direct red card = 4 points);
9. Drawing of lots.

== Groups ==
The matches were played between 22 and 26 March 2019.

Schedule
Matchday	Dates	Matches	
Matchday	Dates	Groups A–E, G–J	Group F
Matchday 1	22 March 2019	1 v 4, 2 v 3	3 v 1
Matchday 2	24 March 2019	4 v 2, 3 v 1	2 v 3
Matchday 3	26 March 2019	1 v 2, 3 v 4	1 v 2

=== Group A ===
- All matches were held in Qatar.
- Times listed are UTC+3.

Pos	Team	Pld	W	D	L	GF	GA	GD	Pts	Qualification
1	Qatar (H)	3	2	1	0	9	2	+7	7	Final tournament
2	Oman	3	2	1	0	5	3	+2	7	
3	Afghanistan	3	1	0	2	3	4	−1	3	
4	Nepal	3	0	0	3	0	8	−8	0	

Source: AFC
Rules for classification: Qualification tiebreakers
(H) Hosts
22 March 2019
17:00

Oman	1–0	Nepal
Al-Malki 13'	Report

Aspire 4, Doha
Attendance: 600
Referee: Dmitriy Mashentsev (Kyrgyzstan)
22 March 2019
19:00

Qatar	2–0	Afghanistan
Palang 13'; A. Al-Ahrak 35' (pen.)	Report

Aspire 5, Doha
Attendance: 900
Referee: Yudai Yamamoto (Japan)

24 March 2019
17:00

Afghanistan	1–2	Oman
Haydary 77' (pen.)	Report	Al-Matroushi 56'; Al-Ghassani 59' (pen.)

Aspire 4, Doha
Attendance: 150
Referee: Ko Hyung-jin (South Korea)
24 March 2019
19:00

Nepal	0–5	Qatar
	Report	A. Al-Ahrak 26' (pen.), 90+2'; Al-Rawi 54', 80'; Rajbanshi 60' (o.g.)

Aspire 5, Doha
Attendance: 850
Referee: Lau Fong Hei (Hong Kong)

26 March 2019
19:00

Qatar	2–2	Oman
Palang 50', 73'	Report	Al-Hidi 20'; Al-Habsi 77'

Aspire 5, Doha
Attendance: 900
Referee: Dmitriy Mashentsev (Kyrgyzstan)
26 March 2019
19:00

Nepal	0–2	Afghanistan
	Report	Khorami 24'; Haydary 34'

Aspire 4, Doha
Attendance: 147
Referee: Yudai Yamamoto (Japan)

=== Group B ===
- All matches were held in Bahrain.
- Times listed are UTC+3.

Pos	Team	Pld	W	D	L	GF	GA	GD	Pts	Qualification
1	Bahrain (H)	3	3	0	0	12	0	+12	9	Final tournament
2	Palestine	3	2	0	1	10	2	+8	6	
3	Bangladesh	3	1	0	2	2	2	0	3	
4	Sri Lanka	3	0	0	3	0	20	−20	0	

Source: AFC
Rules for classification: Qualification tiebreakers
(H) Hosts
22 March 2019
16:00

Palestine	9–0	Sri Lanka
Al-Iwisat 7'; Emghamis 10', 30'; Dabbagh 24'; Iraqi 60'; Salma 68'; Farawi 70' (pen.); Dahla 72' (pen.); Abdelsalam 79'	Report

Khalifa Sports City Stadium, Isa Town
Attendance: 1,162
Referee: Kim Dae-yong (South Korea)
22 March 2019
19:00

Bahrain	1–0	Bangladesh
Al-Hardan 21'	Report

Khalifa Sports City Stadium, Isa Town
Attendance: 8,500
Referee: Jumpei Iida (Japan)

24 March 2019
16:00

Bangladesh	0–1	Palestine
	Report	Abdallah 22'

Khalifa Sports City Stadium, Isa Town
Attendance: 2,583
Referee: Mohd Amirul Izwan Yaacob (Malaysia)
24 March 2019
19:00

Sri Lanka	0–9	Bahrain
	Report	Marhoon 14', 45+1'; Al-Shamsi 23'; Isa 29' (pen.), 85'; Khalid 31' (pen.); Al-Sherooqi 48'; Bughammar 74' (pen.), 80'

Khalifa Sports City Stadium, Isa Town
Attendance: 2,746
Referee: Valentin Kovalenko (Uzbekistan)

26 March 2019
16:00

Bangladesh	2–0	Sri Lanka
B. Ahmed 5'; Badsha 18'	Report

Khalifa Sports City Stadium, Isa Town
Attendance: 2,789
Referee: Kim Dae-yong (South Korea)
26 March 2019
19:00

Palestine	0–2	Bahrain
	Report	Al-Hardan 78' (pen.); Al-Sherooqi 89'

Khalifa Sports City Stadium, Isa Town
Attendance: 4,140
Referee: Jumpei Iida (Japan)

=== Group C ===
- All matches were held in Iran.
- Times listed are UTC+4:30.

Pos	Team	Pld	W	D	L	GF	GA	GD	Pts	Qualification
1	Iraq	3	2	1	0	7	0	+7	7	Final tournament
2	Iran (H)	3	2	1	0	6	1	+5	7	Final tournament
3	Turkmenistan	3	0	1	2	1	5	−4	1	
4	Yemen	3	0	1	2	0	8	−8	1	

Source: AFC
Rules for classification: Qualification tiebreakers
(H) Hosts
22 March 2019
15:45

Iraq	5–0	Yemen
Al-Ammari 16', 44' (pen.); Jabbar 35'; Subeh 65' (pen.), 79'	Report

Shahid Dastgerdi Stadium, Tehran
Attendance: 102
Referee: Muhammad Taqi (Singapore)
22 March 2019
18:45

Iran	3–1	Turkmenistan
Başimow 35' (o.g.); Noorafkan 54'; Jabireh 90+2'	Report	Gürgenow 75'

Azadi Stadium, Tehran
Attendance: 1,732
Referee: Minoru Tōjō (Japan)

24 March 2019
15:45

Turkmenistan	0–2	Iraq
	Report	Subeh 17'; S. Jabbar 88'

Shahid Dastgerdi Stadium, Tehran
Attendance: 157
Referee: Pranjal Banerjee (India)
24 March 2019
18:45

Yemen	0–3	Iran
	Report	Shekari 55'; Jabireh 67'; Mehdikhani 75'

Azadi Stadium, Tehran
Attendance: 2,931
Referee: Sivakorn Pu-udom (Thailand)

26 March 2019
15:45

Turkmenistan	0–0	Yemen
	Report

Shahid Dastgerdi Stadium, Tehran
Attendance: 10
Referee: Sivakorn Pu-udom (Thailand)
26 March 2019
18:45

Iraq	0–0	Iran
	Report

Azadi Stadium, Tehran
Attendance: 2,520
Referee: Muhammad Taqi (Singapore)

=== Group D ===
- All matches were held in Saudi Arabia.
- Times listed are UTC+3.

Pos	Team	Pld	W	D	L	GF	GA	GD	Pts	Qualification
1	United Arab Emirates	3	2	1	0	10	2	+8	7	Final tournament
2	Saudi Arabia (H)	3	2	1	0	9	1	+8	7	Final tournament
3	Lebanon	3	1	0	2	7	8	−1	3	
4	Maldives	3	0	0	3	0	15	−15	0	

Source: AFC
Rules for classification: Qualification tiebreakers
(H) Hosts
22 March 2019
17:25

United Arab Emirates	6–1	Lebanon
Z. Al-Ameri 29', 60' (pen.), 69'; M. Rashed 42'; M. Al-Hammadi 55'; Yaqoub 79'	Report	Eid 16'

Prince Faisal bin Fahd Stadium, Riyadh
Attendance: 200
Referee: Ali Shaban (Kuwait)
22 March 2019
20:25

Saudi Arabia	6–0	Maldives
A. Al-Yami 26'; Al-Hamdan 27', 67', 73'; Ghareeb 49'; Al-Khulaif 78'	Report

Prince Faisal bin Fahd Stadium, Riyadh
Attendance: 122
Referee: Takuto Okabe (Japan)

24 March 2019
17:25

Maldives	0–3	United Arab Emirates
	Report	M. Al-Hammadi 29'; Z. Al-Ameri 49'; Shaker 76'

Prince Faisal bin Fahd Stadium, Riyadh
Attendance: 28
Referee: Zhang Lei (China)
24 March 2019
20:25

Lebanon	0–2	Saudi Arabia
	Report	A. Al-Yami 30'; S. Al-Selouli 90+3'

Prince Faisal bin Fahd Stadium, Riyadh
Attendance: 262
Referee: Aziz Asimov (Uzbekistan)

26 March 2019
17:25

Lebanon	6–0	Maldives
Kdouh 24'; Darwiche 26'; Mehanna 59'; Monzer 62'; Y. Al Haj 75'; Boutros 82'	Report

Prince Faisal bin Fahd Stadium, Riyadh
Attendance: 130
Referee: Zhang Lei (China)
26 March 2019
20:25

Saudi Arabia	1–1	United Arab Emirates
S. Al-Selouli 64'	Report	Z. Al-Ameri 51'

Prince Faisal bin Fahd Stadium, Riyadh
Attendance: 300
Referee: Takuto Okabe (Japan)

=== Group E ===
- All matches were held in Kuwait.
- Times listed are UTC+3.

Pos	Team	Pld	W	D	L	GF	GA	GD	Pts	Qualification
1	Jordan	3	2	1	0	6	2	+4	7	Final tournament
2	Syria	3	2	1	0	5	1	+4	7	Final tournament
3	Kuwait (H)	3	1	0	2	4	6	−2	3	
4	Kyrgyzstan	3	0	0	3	2	8	−6	0	

Source: AFC
Rules for classification: Qualification tiebreakers
(H) Hosts
22 March 2019
17:15

Syria	2–0	Kyrgyzstan
Barakat 39'; Dali 90+4'	Report

Jaber Al-Ahmad International Stadium, Kuwait City
Attendance: 150
Referee: Mohanad Qassim (Iraq)
22 March 2019
20:15

Jordan	2–1	Kuwait
Al-Barri 34'; Bani Attiah 51'	Report	F. Al-Otaibi 21'

Jaber Al-Ahmad International Stadium, Kuwait City
Attendance: 1,100
Referee: Fu Ming (China)

24 March 2019
17:15

Kyrgyzstan	0–3	Jordan
	Report	Al-Taamari 15' (pen.); Hani 60'; Bani Attiah 63'

Jaber Al-Ahmad International Stadium, Kuwait City
Attendance: 147
Referee: Rowan Arumughan (India)
24 March 2019
20:15

Kuwait	0–2	Syria
	Report	Koaeh 10'; Barakat 23'

Jaber Al-Ahmad International Stadium, Kuwait City
Attendance: 300
Referee: Kim Hee-gon (South Korea)

26 March 2019
17:15

Jordan	1–1	Syria
Bani Attiah 76'	Report	Barakat 84'

Jaber Al-Ahmad International Stadium, Kuwait City
Attendance: 350
Referee: Fu Ming (China)
26 March 2019
20:15

Kyrgyzstan	2–3	Kuwait
Batyrkanov 40', 68'	Report	Al-Hadiyah 4'; Al-Ajmi 11'; Abdulrahman 57'

Jaber Al-Ahmad International Stadium, Kuwait City
Attendance: 220
Referee: Mohanad Qassim (Iraq)

=== Group F ===
- All matches were held in Uzbekistan.
- Times listed are UTC+5.

Pos	Team	Pld	W	D	L	GF	GA	GD	Pts	Qualification
1	Uzbekistan (H)	2	1	1	0	3	0	+3	4	Final tournament
2	Tajikistan	2	1	1	0	2	0	+2	4	
3	India	2	0	0	2	0	5	−5	0	
4	Pakistan	0	0	0	0	0	0	0	0	Withdrew

Source: AFC
Rules for classification: Qualification tiebreakers
(H) Hosts
22 March 2019
17:00

India	0–3	Uzbekistan
	Report	Kobilov 45+1' (pen.); Abdikholikov 78', 83'

Pakhtakor Central Stadium, Tashkent
Attendance: 2,452
Referee: Ahmed Al-Kaf (Oman)

24 March 2019
17:00

Tajikistan	2–0	India
Yodgorov 30'; Solehov 85'	Report

Pakhtakor Central Stadium, Tashkent
Attendance: 282
Referee: Ho Wai Sing (Hong Kong)

26 March 2019
17:00

Uzbekistan	0–0	Tajikistan
	Report

Pakhtakor Central Stadium, Tashkent
Attendance: 4,287
Referee: Hiroyuki Kimura (Japan)

=== Group G ===
- All matches were held in Mongolia.
- Times listed are UTC+8.

Pos	Team	Pld	W	D	L	GF	GA	GD	Pts	Qualification
1	North Korea	3	2	1	0	4	1	+3	7	Final tournament
2	Singapore	3	1	2	0	5	3	+2	5	
3	Hong Kong	3	1	1	1	2	3	−1	4	
4	Mongolia (H)	3	0	0	3	1	5	−4	0	

Source: AFC
Rules for classification: Qualification tiebreakers
(H) Hosts
22 March 2019
13:00

Hong Kong	1–1	Singapore
Tsui Wang Kit 52'	Report	Tan 53'

MFF Football Centre, Ulaanbaatar
Attendance: 100
Referee: Hanna Hattab (Syria)
22 March 2019
17:00

North Korea	1–0	Mongolia
Jong Kum-song 37'	Report

MFF Football Centre, Ulaanbaatar
Attendance: 636
Referee: Omar Mohamed Al-Ali (United Arab Emirates)

24 March 2019
13:00

Singapore	1–1	North Korea
Ikhsan 2'	Report	Pak Kwang-hun 7'

MFF Football Centre, Ulaanbaatar
Attendance: 98
Referee: Ali Reda (Lebanon)
24 March 2019
17:00

Mongolia	0–1	Hong Kong
	Report	Yue Tze Nam 71'

MFF Football Centre, Ulaanbaatar
Attendance: 1,028
Referee: Omar Al-Yaqoubi (Oman)

26 March 2019
13:00

North Korea	2–0	Hong Kong
Ri Kum-hyok 41'; Jon Hyok 53' (pen.)	Report

MFF Football Centre, Ulaanbaatar
Attendance: 55
Referee: Omar Al-Yaqoubi (Oman)
26 March 2019
17:00

Singapore	3–1	Mongolia
Amiruldin 32'; Irfan 43'; Hami 71'	Report	Khash-Erdene 3'

MFF Football Centre, Ulaanbaatar
Attendance: 420
Referee: Ali Reda (Lebanon)

=== Group H ===
- All matches were held in Cambodia.
- Times listed are UTC+7.

Pos	Team	Pld	W	D	L	GF	GA	GD	Pts	Qualification
1	South Korea	3	2	1	0	16	3	+13	7	Final tournament
2	Australia	3	2	1	0	14	2	+12	7	Final tournament
3	Cambodia (H)	3	0	1	2	2	13	−11	1	
4	Chinese Taipei	3	0	1	2	1	15	−14	1	

Source: AFC
Rules for classification: Qualification tiebreakers
(H) Hosts
22 March 2019
17:00

South Korea	8–0	Chinese Taipei
Lee Dong-jun 14' (pen.), 33'; Seo Gyeong-ju 39'; Lee Si-heon 68'; Cho Young-wook 69'; Lee Dong-gyeong 72', 73', 85'	Report

Phnom Penh Olympic Stadium, Phnom Penh
Attendance: 1,113
Referee: Sultan Al-Marzooqi (United Arab Emirates)
22 March 2019
20:00

Australia	6–0	Cambodia
O'Neill 21'; Champness 29', 90+3'; McGree 31'; Wilson 42'; Waring 67'	Report

Phnom Penh Olympic Stadium, Phnom Penh
Attendance: 3,118
Referee: Ammar Mahfoodh (Bahrain)

24 March 2019
17:00

Chinese Taipei	0–6	Australia
	Report	Majok 18', 24'; Deng 45+3'; Mourdoukoutas 50'; Waring 63', 88'

Phnom Penh Olympic Stadium, Phnom Penh
Attendance: 424
Referee: Yaqoob Abdul Baki (Oman)
24 March 2019
20:00

Cambodia	1–6	South Korea
N. Kakada 60'	Report	Han Chan-hee 4'; Jang Min-gyu 8'; Kim Bo-sub 57'; Sovann 80' (o.g.); Lee Dong-gyeong 84', 90+3'

Phnom Penh Olympic Stadium, Phnom Penh
Attendance: 1,328
Referee: Mohammed Al-Hoish (Saudi Arabia)

26 March 2019
17:00

South Korea	2–2	Australia
Cho Young-wook 26'; Lee Dong-gyeong 63'	Report	D'Agostino 16', 24'

Phnom Penh Olympic Stadium, Phnom Penh
Attendance: 455
Referee: Yaqoob Abdul Baki (Oman)
26 March 2019
20:00

Cambodia	1–1	Chinese Taipei
S. Kakada 40'	Report	Ponder 57'

Phnom Penh Olympic Stadium, Phnom Penh
Attendance: 1,662
Referee: Mohammed Al-Hoish (Saudi Arabia)

=== Group I ===
- All matches were held in Myanmar.
- Times listed are UTC+6:30.

Pos	Team	Pld	W	D	L	GF	GA	GD	Pts	Qualification
1	Japan	3	3	0	0	21	0	+21	9	Final tournament
2	Myanmar (H)	3	2	0	1	11	7	+4	6	
3	Timor-Leste	3	1	0	2	5	16	−11	3	
4	Macau	3	0	0	3	3	17	−14	0	

Source: AFC
Rules for classification: Qualification tiebreakers
(H) Hosts
22 March 2019
15:00

Japan	8–0	Macau
Machida 51'; Ueda 54', 60', 70'; Endo 67'; Maeda 69', 72'; Itakura 90+5'	Report

Thuwunna Stadium, Yangon
Attendance: 303
Referee: Mooud Bonyadifar (Iran)
22 March 2019
18:00

Myanmar	7–0	Timor-Leste
Hein Htet Aung 4', 5'; Myat Kaung Khant 24'; Win Naing Tun 45+2', 64'; Zayar Naing 52'; Ye Min Thu 62'	Report

Thuwunna Stadium, Yangon
Attendance: 4,220
Referee: Ahmad Yacoub Ibrahim (Jordan)

24 March 2019
15:00

Timor-Leste	0–6	Japan
	Report	Tagawa 24'; Kubo 54', 75'; Tatsuta 60'; Itakura 71'; Ueda 77'

Thuwunna Stadium, Yangon
Attendance: 753
Referee: Hussein Abo Yehia (Lebanon)
24 March 2019
18:00

Macau	0–4	Myanmar
	Report	Ye Min Thu 2'; Win Naing Tun 19' (pen.), 72'; Lwin Moe Aung 86'

Thuwunna Stadium, Yangon
Attendance: 5,200
Referee: Çarymyrat Kurbanow (Turkmenistan)

26 March 2019
15:00

Timor-Leste	5–3	Macau
Wan Tin Iao 3' (o.g.); Gama 43'; Araújo 67', 90+3'; Cruz 79'	Report	Jeronimo 63' (pen.); Leung Chi Seng 66'; Leong Hou In 85'

Thuwunna Stadium, Yangon
Attendance: 1,528
Referee: Hussein Abo Yehia (Lebanon)
26 March 2019
18:00

Japan	7–0	Myanmar
Maeda 7', 9', 44'; Iwasaki 18', 69'; Nakayama 38', 79'	Report

Thuwunna Stadium, Yangon
Attendance: 9,875
Referee: Mooud Bonyadifar (Iran)

=== Group J ===
- All matches were held in Malaysia.
- Times listed are UTC+8.

Pos	Team	Pld	W	D	L	GF	GA	GD	Pts	Qualification
1	China	3	2	1	0	15	2	+13	7	Final tournament
2	Malaysia (H)	3	2	1	0	6	2	+4	7	
3	Laos	3	1	0	2	3	8	−5	3	
4	Philippines	3	0	0	3	2	14	−12	0	

Source: AFC
Rules for classification: Qualification tiebreakers
(H) Hosts
22 March 2019
16:30

China	5–0	Laos
Yang Liyu 30' (pen.), 45+2'; Shan Huanhuan 42'; Lin Liangming 90+2'; Cao Yongjing 90+5'	Report

Shah Alam Stadium, Shah Alam
Attendance: 128
Referee: Yaqoub Al-Hammadi (United Arab Emirates)
22 March 2019
20:45

Malaysia	3–0	Philippines
Akhyar 4', 31'; Faisal 83'	Report

Shah Alam Stadium, Shah Alam
Attendance: 7,606
Referee: Turki Al-Khudhayr (Saudi Arabia)

24 March 2019
16:30

Philippines	0–8	China
	Report	Shan Huanhuan 10', 77'; Hu Jinghang 14', 42'; Huang Cong 19'; Lin Liangming 29'; Zhang Yuning 49', 90'

Shah Alam Stadium, Shah Alam
Attendance: 394
Referee: Yaqoub Al-Hammadi (United Arab Emirates)
24 March 2019
20:45

Laos	0–1	Malaysia
	Report	Safawi 81'

Shah Alam Stadium, Shah Alam
Attendance: 9,705
Referee: Masoud Tufayelieh (Syria)

26 March 2019
16:30

Laos	3–2	Philippines
Latthachack 74'; Douangmaity 88'; Bounkong 90+3'	Report	Gayoso 11', 33' (pen.)

Shah Alam Stadium, Shah Alam
Attendance: 275
Referee: Ahmed Al-Ali (Jordan)
26 March 2019
20:45

Malaysia	2–2	China
Syahmi 10'; Danial 55'	Report	Zhang Yuning 16'; Jiang Shenglong 84'

Shah Alam Stadium, Shah Alam
Attendance: 26,183
Referee: Turki Al-Khudhayr (Saudi Arabia)

=== Group K ===
- All matches were held in Vietnam.
- Times listed are UTC+7.

Pos	Team	Pld	W	D	L	GF	GA	GD	Pts	Qualification
1	Vietnam (H)	3	3	0	0	11	0	+11	9	Final tournament
2	Thailand (Note: Thailand, as final tournament hosts, automatically qualified regardless of qualification results.)	3	2	0	1	12	4	+8	6	Final tournament
3	Indonesia	3	1	0	2	2	6	−4	3	
4	Brunei	3	0	0	3	1	16	−15	0	

Source: AFC
Rules for classification: Qualification tiebreakers
(H) Hosts
Notes:
22 March 2019
17:00

Thailand	4–0	Indonesia
Shinnaphat 21'; Supachai 50' (pen.), 71'; Supachok 74'	Report

Mỹ Đình National Stadium, Hanoi
Attendance: 1,053
Referee: Sherzod Kasimov (Uzbekistan)
22 March 2019
20:00

Vietnam	6–0	Brunei
Hà Đức Chinh 11'; Nguyễn Thành Chung 24'; Đinh Thanh Bình 45+1'; Triệu Việt Hưng 60'; Huỳnh Tấn Sinh 77' (pen.); Nguyễn Quang Hải 90+2' (pen.)	Report

Mỹ Đình National Stadium, Hanoi
Attendance: 7,689
Referee: Adham Makhadmeh (Jordan)

24 March 2019
17:00

Brunei	0–8	Thailand
	Report	Supachok 21'; Supachai 49', 67', 72'; Suphanat 58'; Anon 63'; Saringkan 76' (pen.); Haimie 90+3' (o.g.)

Mỹ Đình National Stadium, Hanoi
Attendance: 1,178
Referee: Bijan Heidari (Iran)
24 March 2019
20:00

Indonesia	0–1	Vietnam
	Report	Triệu Việt Hưng 90+4'

Mỹ Đình National Stadium, Hanoi
Attendance: 25,591
Referee: Saoud Al-Athbah (Qatar)

26 March 2019
17:00

Indonesia	2–1	Brunei
Dimas 31'; Raffi 79'	Report	Azim 85' (pen.)

Mỹ Đình National Stadium, Hanoi
Attendance: 825
Referee: Bijan Heidari (Iran)
26 March 2019
20:00

Vietnam	4–0	Thailand
Hà Đức Chinh 17'; Nguyễn Hoàng Đức 53'; Nguyễn Thành Chung 63'; Trần Thanh Sơn 90+2'	Report

Mỹ Đình National Stadium, Hanoi
Attendance: 38,278
Referee: Sherzod Kasimov (Uzbekistan)

=== Ranking of second-placed teams ===
Due to groups having different number of teams (after the withdrawal of Pakistan from Group F), the results against the fourth-placed teams in four-team groups were not considered for this ranking.

Pos	Grp	Team	Pld	W	D	L	GF	GA	GD	Pts	Qualification
1	H	Australia	2	1	1	0	8	2	+6	4	Final tournament
2	C	Iran	2	1	1	0	3	1	+2	4 (Note: Disciplinary points: Iran –2, Syria –2, Saudi Arabia –3.)	Final tournament
2	E	Syria	2	1	1	0	3	1	+2	4	Final tournament
4	D	Saudi Arabia	2	1	1	0	3	1	+2	4	Final tournament
5	F	Tajikistan	2	1	1	0	2	0	+2	4	
6	A	Oman	2	1	1	0	4	3	+1	4	
7	J	Malaysia	2	1	1	0	3	2	+1	4	
8	I	Myanmar	2	1	0	1	7	7	0	3	
9	K	Thailand (Note: Thailand, as final tournament hosts, automatically qualified regardless of qualification results.)	2	1	0	1	4	4	0	3	Final tournament
10	B	Palestine	2	1	0	1	1	2	−1	3	
11	G	Singapore	2	0	2	0	2	2	0	2	

Source: AFC
Rules for classification: 1) points; 2) goal difference; 3) goals scored; 4) disciplinary points; 5) drawing of lots.

== Qualified teams ==
The following 16 teams qualified for the 2020 AFC U-23 Championship.

Team	Qualified as	Qualified on	Previous appearances in AFC U-23 Championship^{1}
Thailand	Hosts	30 August 2018	2 (2016, 2018)
Qatar	Group A winners	26 March 2019	2 (2016, 2018)
Bahrain	Group B winners	26 March 2019	0 (debut)
Iraq	Group C winners	26 March 2019	3 (**2013**, 2016, 2018)
United Arab Emirates	Group D winners	26 March 2019	2 (2013, 2016)
Jordan	Group E winners	26 March 2019	3 (2013, 2016, 2018)
Uzbekistan	Group F winners	26 March 2019	3 (2013, 2016, **2018**)
North Korea	Group G winners	26 March 2019	3 (2013, 2016, 2018)
South Korea	Group H winners	26 March 2019	3 (2013, 2016, 2018)
Japan	Group I winners	26 March 2019	3 (2013, **2016**, 2018)
China	Group J winners	26 March 2019	3 (2013, 2016, 2018)
Vietnam	Group K winners	26 March 2019	2 (2016, 2018)
Australia	1st best runners-up	26 March 2019	3 (2013, 2016, 2018)
Iran	2nd best runners-up	26 March 2019	2 (2013, 2016)
Syria	3rd best runners-up	26 March 2019	3 (2013, 2016, 2018)
Saudi Arabia	4th best runners-up	26 March 2019	3 (2013, 2016, 2018)

^{1} Bold indicates champions for that year. Italic indicates hosts for that year.

== Goalscorers ==
There were 240 goals scored in 63 matches, for an average of 3.81 goals per match.

6 goals

- (South Korea) Lee Dong-gyeong

5 goals

- (Japan) Daizen Maeda
- (Thailand) Supachai Jaided
- (United Arab Emirates) Zaid Al-Ameri

4 goals

- (Japan) Ayase Ueda
- (Myanmar) Win Naing Tun

3 goals

- (Australia) Pierce Waring
- (China) Shan Huanhuan
- (China) Zhang Yuning
- (Iraq) Murad Subeh
- (Jordan) Mohammad Bani Attiah
- (Qatar) Hassan Palang
- (Qatar) Abdullah Al-Ahrak
- (Saudi Arabia) Abdullah Al-Hamdan
- (Syria) Abd Al-Rahman Barakat

2 goals

- (Afghanistan) Omran Haydary
- (Australia) Joe Champness
- (Australia) Nicholas D'Agostino
- (Australia) Abraham Majok
- (Bahrain) Mohammed Al-Hardan
- (Bahrain) Ahmed Al-Sherooqi
- (Bahrain) Ahmed Bughammar
- (Bahrain) Sayed Hashim Isa
- (Bahrain) Mohamed Marhoon
- (China) Hu Jinghang
- (China) Lin Liangming
- (China) Yang Liyu
- (Iran) Reza Jabireh
- (Iraq) Amir Al-Ammari
- (Japan) Ko Itakura
- (Japan) Yuto Iwasaki
- (Japan) Takefusa Kubo
- (Japan) Yuta Nakayama
- (Kyrgyzstan) Ernist Batyrkanov
- (Malaysia) Akhyar Rashid
- (Myanmar) Hein Htet Aung
- (Myanmar) Ye Min Thu
- (Palestine) Yousef Emghamis
- (Philippines) Javier Gayoso
- (Qatar) Bassam Al-Rawi
- (Saudi Arabia) Saad Al-Selouli
- (Saudi Arabia) Abdulrahman Al-Yami
- (South Korea) Cho Young-wook
- (South Korea) Lee Dong-jun
- (Thailand) Supachok Sarachat
- (Timor-Leste) Danilson Araújo
- (United Arab Emirates) Mohammed Al-Hammadi
- (Uzbekistan) Bobur Abdikholikov
- (Vietnam) Hà Đức Chinh
- (Vietnam) Nguyễn Thành Chung
- (Vietnam) Triệu Việt Hưng

1 goal

- (Afghanistan) Suliman Khorami
- (Australia) Thomas Deng
- (Australia) Riley McGree
- (Australia) Tass Mourdoukoutas
- (Australia) Aiden O'Neill
- (Australia) Brandon Wilson
- (Bahrain) Naseem Al-Shamsi
- (Bahrain) Abdulaziz Khalid
- (Bangladesh) Biplu Ahmed
- (Bangladesh) Tutul Hossain Badsha
- (Brunei) Azim Izamuddin Suhaimi
- (Cambodia) Narong Kakada
- (Cambodia) Sin Kakada
- (China) Cao Yongjing
- (China) Huang Cong
- (China) Jiang Shenglong
- (Chinese Taipei) Philip Ponder
- (Hong Kong) Tsui Wang Kit
- (Hong Kong) Yue Tze Nam
- (Indonesia) Dimas Drajad
- (Indonesia) Raffi Syarahil
- (Iran) Mehdi Mehdikhani
- (Iran) Omid Noorafkan
- (Iran) Reza Shekari
- (Iraq) Hussein Jabbar
- (Iraq) Sajjad Jabbar
- (Japan) Keita Endo
- (Japan) Koki Machida
- (Japan) Kyosuke Tagawa
- (Japan) Yugo Tatsuta
- (Jordan) Ward Al-Barri
- (Jordan) Musa Al-Taamari
- (Jordan) Omar Hani
- (Kuwait) Badr Abdulrahman
- (Kuwait) Abdulmohsen Al-Ajmi
- (Kuwait) Abdulaziz Al-Hadiyah
- (Kuwait) Fawaz Al-Otaibi
- (Laos) Bounphachan Bounkong
- (Laos) Vannasone Douangmaity
- (Laos) Chitpasong Latthachack
- (Lebanon) Youssef Al Haj
- (Lebanon) Alex Boutros
- (Lebanon) Karim Darwiche
- (Lebanon) Fouad Eid
- (Lebanon) Mohammad Kdouh
- (Lebanon) Hassan Mehanna
- (Lebanon) Hussein Monzer
- (Macau) Leong Hou In
- (Macau) Leung Chi Seng
- (Macau) Augusto Jeronimo
- (Malaysia) Faisal Halim
- (Malaysia) Danial Haqim
- (Malaysia) Safawi Rasid
- (Malaysia) Syahmi Safari
- (Mongolia) Khash-Erdene Batbayar
- (Myanmar) Myat Kaung Khant
- (Myanmar) Lwin Moe Aung
- (Myanmar) Zayar Naing
- (North Korea) Jon Hyok
- (North Korea) Jong Kum-song
- (North Korea) Pak Kwang-hun
- (North Korea) Ri Kum-hyok
- (Oman) Muhsen Al-Ghassani
- (Oman) Saud Al-Habsi
- (Oman) Amran Al-Hidi
- (Oman) Yousuf Al-Malki
- (Oman) Ahmed Al-Matroushi
- (Palestine) Hani Abdallah
- (Palestine) Saadou Abdelsalam
- (Palestine) Mahmoud Al-Iwisat
- (Palestine) Oday Dabbagh
- (Palestine) Raed Dahla
- (Palestine) Mousa Farawi
- (Palestine) Dawoud Iraqi
- (Palestine) Mahmoud Salma
- (Saudi Arabia) Ayman Al-Khulaif
- (Saudi Arabia) Abdulrahman Ghareeb
- (Singapore) Amiruldin Asraf
- (Singapore) Ikhsan Fandi
- (Singapore) Irfan Fandi
- (Singapore) Hami Syahin
- (Singapore) Lionel Tan
- (South Korea) Han Chan-hee
- (South Korea) Jang Min-gyu
- (South Korea) Kim Bo-sub
- (South Korea) Lee Si-heon
- (South Korea) Seo Gyeong-ju
- (Syria) Alaa Dali
- (Syria) Kamel Koaeh
- (Tajikistan) Sharafdzhon Solehov
- (Tajikistan) Daler Yodgorov
- (Thailand) Anon Amornlerdsak
- (Thailand) Shinnaphat Leeaoh
- (Thailand) Suphanat Mueanta
- (Thailand) Saringkan Promsupa
- (Timor-Leste) Henrique Cruz
- (Timor-Leste) Rufino Gama
- (Turkmenistan) Bagtyýar Gürgenow
- (United Arab Emirates) Majed Rashed
- (United Arab Emirates) Mohammed Ali Shaker
- (United Arab Emirates) Jassem Yaqoub
- (Uzbekistan) Islom Kobilov
- (Vietnam) Đinh Thanh Bình
- (Vietnam) Huỳnh Tấn Sinh
- (Vietnam) Nguyễn Hoàng Đức
- (Vietnam) Nguyễn Quang Hải
- (Vietnam) Trần Thanh Sơn

1 own goal

- (Brunei) Haimie Anak Nyaring (against Thailand)
- (Cambodia) Ouk Sovann (against South Korea)
- (Macau) Wan Tin Iao (against Timor-Leste)
- (Nepal) Dinesh Rajbanshi (against Qatar)
- (Turkmenistan) Şazada Başimow (against Iran)
