= 2020 AFC U-23 Championship squads =

List of squads for each national team which competed at the 2020 AFC U-23 Championship

The following is a list of squads for each national team which competed at the 2020 AFC U-23 Championship. The tournament took place in Thailand, between 8–26 January 2020. It was the fourth U-23 age group competition organised by the Asian Football Confederation. As the tournament was not held during the FIFA International Match Calendar, clubs were not obligated to release the players.

The sixteen national teams involved in the tournament were required to register a squad of minimum 18 and maximum 23 players, minimum three of whom must be goalkeepers (Regulations Articles 24.1 and 24.2). Only players in these squads were eligible to take part in the tournament. Players born on or after 1 January 1997 were eligible to compete in the tournament. AFC published the final lists with squad numbers on their website on 2 January 2020.

The full squad listings are below. The age listed for each player is on 8 January 2020, the first day of the tournament. The nationality for each club reflects the national association (not the league) to which the club is affiliated. A flag is included for coaches who are of a different nationality than their own national team. Players in boldface have been capped at full international level at some point in their career.

== Group A ==
=== Thailand ===
Coach: (Japan) Akira Nishino

The preliminary squad was announced on 23 December 2019. The final squad was announced on 30 December 2019.

No.	Pos.	Player	Date of birth (age)	Club
1	GK	Korraphat Nareechan	7 October 1997 (aged 22)	(Football Association of Thailand) Chiangmai
2	DF	Thitawee Aksornsri	8 November 1997 (aged 22)	(Football Association of Thailand) Police Tero
3	DF	Thitathorn Aksornsri	8 November 1997 (aged 22)	(Football Association of Thailand) Police Tero
4	DF	Chatchai Saengdao	11 January 1997 (aged 22)	(Football Association of Thailand) Muangthong United
5	DF	**Shinnaphat Leeaoh**	2 February 1997 (aged 22)	(Football Association of Thailand) Chiangrai United
6	MF	**Airfan Doloh**	26 January 2001 (aged 18)	(Football Association of Thailand) Buriram United
7	MF	**Wisarut Imura**	18 October 1997 (aged 22)	(Football Association of Thailand) Bangkok United
8	MF	**Worachit Kanitsribampen**	24 August 1997 (aged 22)	(Football Association of Thailand) Chonburi
9	FW	**Supachai Chaided**	1 December 1998 (aged 21)	(Football Association of Thailand) Buriram United
10	MF	**Supachok Sarachat**	22 May 1998 (aged 21)	(Football Association of Thailand) Buriram United
11	FW	**Anon Amornlerdsak**	6 November 1997 (aged 22)	(Football Association of Thailand) Bangkok United
12	DF	Meechok Marhasaranukun	12 December 1997 (aged 22)	(Football Association of Thailand) Suphanburi
13	FW	**Jaroensak Wonggorn**	18 May 1997 (aged 22)	(Football Association of Thailand) Samut Prakan City
14	DF	Peerawat Akkratum	3 December 1998 (aged 21)	(Football Association of Thailand) PT Prachuap
15	DF	Saringkan Promsupa	29 March 1997 (aged 22)	(Football Association of Thailand) Muangthong United
16	MF	Sorawit Panthong	20 February 1997 (aged 22)	(Football Association of Thailand) Muangthong United
17	FW	**Suphanat Mueanta**	2 August 2002 (aged 17)	(Football Association of Thailand) Buriram United
18	MF	**Kritsada Kaman**	18 March 1999 (aged 20)	(Football Association of Thailand) Chonburi
19	FW	Nantawat Suankaew	8 December 1997 (aged 22)	(Football Association of Thailand) Rayong
20	GK	Kiadtisak Chaodon	19 July 1999 (aged 20)	(Football Association of Thailand) Udon Thani
21	MF	Kannarin Thawornsak	27 May 1997 (aged 22)	(Football Association of Thailand) Port
22	MF	**Ben Davis**	24 November 2000 (aged 19)	(The Football Association) Fulham
23	GK	Supawat Yokakul	10 February 2000 (aged 19)	(Football Association of Thailand) Samut Prakan City

=== Iraq ===
Coach: Abdul-Ghani Shahad

The final squad was announced on 1 January 2020.

No.	Pos.	Player	Date of birth (age)	Club
1	GK	Arian Sevok	1 July 1997 (aged 22)	(Iraq Football Association) Zakho
2	DF	**Mustafa Mohammed**	14 January 1998 (aged 21)	(Iraq Football Association) Al-Zawraa
3	DF	**Mustafa Maan**	15 January 1997 (aged 22)	(Iraq Football Association) Al-Quwa Al-Jawiya
4	DF	**Najm Shwan**	9 July 1997 (aged 22)	(Iraq Football Association) Al-Zawraa
5	DF	Abdul-Abbas Ayad	18 March 2000 (aged 19)	(Iraq Football Association) Al-Naft
6	MF	**Amir Al-Ammari**	27 July 1997 (aged 22)	(Swedish Football Association) Jönköpings Södra
7	FW	**Murad Mohammed**	1 April 1997 (aged 22)	(Iraq Football Association) Al-Kahrabaa
8	MF	Ali Qasim	17 February 1997 (aged 22)	(Iraq Football Association) Al-Najaf
9	FW	Mohammed Nassif	25 August 1997 (aged 22)	(Iraq Football Association) Al-Quwa Al-Jawiya
10	MF	**Ridha Jalil**	17 February 2000 (aged 19)	(Iraq Football Association) Al-Zawraa
11	MF	Omer Assi	3 January 1998 (aged 22)	(Iraq Football Association) Al-Karkh
12	GK	Ali Kadhim	24 October 1997 (aged 22)	(Iraq Football Association) Naft Al-Wasat
13	DF	Ihab Jarir	11 January 1997 (aged 22)	(Iraq Football Association) Al-Quwa Al-Jawiya
14	FW	**Hussein Jabbar**	9 March 1998 (aged 21)	(Iraq Football Association) Al-Quwa Al-Jawiya
15	DF	Alaa Raad	20 February 1998 (aged 21)	(Iraq Football Association) Al-Zawraa
16	MF	Saad Al-Hasan	9 March 1998 (aged 21)	(Iraq Football Association) Al-Karkh
17	DF	**Hassan Raed**	23 September 2000 (aged 19)	(Iraq Football Association) Al-Quwa Al-Jawiya
18	MF	Mueen Ahmed	1 January 1997 (aged 23)	(Iraq Football Association) Al-Najaf
19	DF	Muntadher Abdul-Sada	3 December 2000 (aged 19)	(Iraq Football Association) Al-Sinaat Al-Kahrabaiya
20	MF	Sadeq Zamil	15 July 1999 (aged 20)	(Iraq Football Association) Naft Al-Wasat
21	DF	Muntadher Sattar	4 January 1997 (aged 23)	(Iraq Football Association) Al-Sinaat Al-Kahrabaiya
22	GK	Husam Mahdi	6 January 1997 (aged 23)	(Iraq Football Association) Al-Minaa
23	MF	**Mohammed Mezher**	24 March 1998 (aged 21)	(Iraq Football Association) Naft Maysan

=== Australia ===
Coach: Graham Arnold

The final squad was announced on 30 December 2019. On 1 January 2020, it was announced that Daniel Margush replaced Tom Heward-Belle who was ruled out due to injury.

No.	Pos.	Player	Date of birth (age)	Club
1	GK	Tom Glover	24 December 1997 (aged 22)	(Football Australia) Melbourne City
2	DF	Gabriel Cleur	31 January 1998 (aged 21)	(Italian Football Federation) Alessandria
3	DF	**Alex Gersbach**	8 May 1997 (aged 22)	(Danish Football Association) Aarhus
4	DF	Dylan Ryan	10 June 2000 (aged 19)	(Royal Dutch Football Association) Willem II
5	DF	Joshua Laws	26 February 1998 (aged 21)	(German Football Association) Fortuna Düsseldorf
6	DF	Tass Mourdoukoutas	3 March 1999 (aged 20)	(Football Australia) Western Sydney Wanderers
7	FW	Ramy Najjarine	23 April 2000 (aged 19)	(Football Australia) Melbourne City
8	MF	Zach Duncan	31 May 2000 (aged 19)	(Danish Football Association) Aarhus
9	FW	Al Hassan Touré	30 May 2000 (aged 19)	(Football Australia) Adelaide United
10	MF	**Denis Genreau**	21 May 1999 (aged 20)	(Football Australia) Melbourne City
11	FW	Reno Piscopo	27 May 1998 (aged 21)	(New Zealand Football) Wellington Phoenix
12	GK	Jordan Holmes	8 May 1997 (aged 22)	(The Football Association) Ebbsfleet United
13	MF	**Aiden O'Neill**	4 July 1998 (aged 21)	(Football Australia) Brisbane Roar
14	DF	**Thomas Deng**	20 March 1997 (aged 22)	(Football Australia) Melbourne Victory
15	FW	**Nicholas D'Agostino**	25 February 1998 (aged 21)	(Football Australia) Perth Glory
16	FW	Trent Buhagiar	27 February 1998 (aged 21)	(Football Australia) Sydney FC
17	MF	**Keanu Baccus**	7 June 1998 (aged 21)	(Football Australia) Western Sydney Wanderers
18	GK	Daniel Margush	28 November 1997 (aged 22)	(Football Australia) Adelaide United
19	MF	Daniel Bouman	7 February 1998 (aged 21)	(Royal Dutch Football Association) SC Cambuur
20	DF	Connor O'Toole	4 July 1997 (aged 22)	(Football Australia) Brisbane Roar
21	FW	Jacob Italiano	30 July 2001 (aged 18)	(German Football Association) Borussia Mönchengladbach
22	FW	**Ben Folami**	8 June 1999 (aged 20)	(The Football Association) Ipswich Town
23	MF	**Connor Metcalfe**	5 November 1999 (aged 20)	(Football Australia) Melbourne City

=== Bahrain ===
Coach: (Tunisia) Samir Chammam

The final squad was announced on 28 December 2019.

No.	Pos.	Player	Date of birth (age)	Club
1	GK	Anwar Ahmed	19 September 1997 (aged 22)	(Bahrain Football Association) Al-Najma
2	DF	Sayed Mohamed Ameen	7 March 1999 (aged 20)	(Bahrain Football Association) Sitra
3	DF	**Ahmed Bughammar**	30 December 1997 (aged 22)	(Bahrain Football Association) Al-Hidd
4	DF	Husain Jameel	3 October 1997 (aged 22)	(Bahrain Football Association) Al-Muharraq
5	DF	**Hamad Al-Shamsan**	29 September 1997 (aged 22)	(Bahrain Football Association) Al-Riffa
6	MF	**Abbas Al-Asfoor**	2 March 1999 (aged 20)	(Bahrain Football Association) Al-Shabab
7	FW	Ahmed Al-Sherooqi	22 May 2000 (aged 19)	(Bahrain Football Association) Al-Muharraq
8	FW	**Mohamed Marhoon**	12 February 1998 (aged 21)	(Bahrain Football Association) Al-Riffa
9	FW	Saleh Sanad	11 January 1998 (aged 21)	(Bahrain Football Association) Al-Muharraq
10	MF	**Mohammed Al-Hardan**	6 October 1997 (aged 22)	(Bahrain Football Association) Al-Muharraq
11	DF	**Abdulaziz Khalid**	17 March 1997 (aged 22)	(Bahrain Football Association) Al-Qalali
12	DF	Ahmed Al-Zaimoor	26 July 1997 (aged 22)	(Bahrain Football Association) Al-Shabab
13	FW	Faisal Ebrahim	28 March 1998 (aged 21)	(Bahrain Football Association) Al-Muharraq
14	FW	Hamza Al-Juban	17 April 2000 (aged 19)	(Bahrain Football Association) Al-Muharraq
15	FW	Hasan Al-Karrani	27 November 1997 (aged 22)	(Bahrain Football Association) Al-Muharraq
16	FW	**Hashim Sayed Isa**	3 April 1998 (aged 21)	(Bahrain Football Association) Al-Riffa
17	MF	Jasim Khelaif	22 February 1998 (aged 21)	(Bahrain Football Association) Al-Hala
18	MF	Adnan Fawaz	30 October 1999 (aged 20)	(Bahrain Football Association) Al-Riffa
19	MF	Ahmadi Abdulrahman	16 April 1998 (aged 21)	(Bahrain Football Association) Al-Muharraq
20	DF	Salem Adel	3 July 1997 (aged 22)	(Bahrain Football Association) Al-Najma
21	GK	Yusuf Habib	9 January 1998 (aged 21)	(Bahrain Football Association) Al-Malkiya
22	MF	Hasan Yahya	27 October 1998 (aged 21)	(Bahrain Football Association) Al-Shabab
23	GK	Ammar Jaafar	10 February 1999 (aged 20)	(Bahrain Football Association) Al-Manama

== Group B ==
=== Qatar ===
Coach: (Spain) Félix Sánchez Bas

The preliminary squad was announced on 29 December 2019.

No.	Pos.	Player	Date of birth (age)	Club
1	GK	**Meshaal Barsham**	14 February 1998 (aged 21)	(Qatar Football Association) Al-Sadd
2	MF	Abdullah Ali Saei	17 March 1999 (aged 20)	(Qatar Football Association) Al-Gharafa
3	DF	Ali Malolah	26 February 1999 (aged 20)	(Qatar Football Association) Al-Wakrah
4	DF	**Tarek Salman**	5 December 1997 (aged 22)	(Qatar Football Association) Al-Sadd
5	DF	**Ahmed Suhail**	8 February 1999 (aged 20)	(Qatar Football Association) Al-Wakrah
6	MF	**Mohammed Waad**	18 September 1999 (aged 20)	(Qatar Football Association) Al-Wakrah
7	FW	**Yusuf Abdurisag**	6 August 1999 (aged 20)	(Qatar Football Association) Al-Arabi
8	FW	Nasser Al Ahrak	5 January 1999 (aged 21)	(Qatar Football Association) Al-Khor
9	FW	Hassan Palang	2 April 1998 (aged 21)	(Qatar Football Association) Al-Wakrah
10	MF	**Abdullah Al-Ahrak**	10 May 1997 (aged 22)	(Qatar Football Association) Al-Ahli
11	FW	**Amro Surag**	8 April 1998 (aged 21)	(Qatar Football Association) Al-Gharafa
12	DF	Khalifah Al-Malki	2 March 1998 (aged 21)	(Qatar Football Association) Al-Arabi
13	DF	Mohammed Emad	27 February 2001 (aged 18)	(Qatar Football Association) Al-Ahli
14	MF	Adel Bader	17 January 1997 (aged 22)	(Qatar Football Association) Al-Sailiya
15	DF	**Jassem Gaber**	20 February 2002 (aged 17)	(Qatar Football Association) Al-Arabi
16	FW	**Hashim Ali**	17 August 2000 (aged 19)	(Qatar Football Association) Al-Sadd
17	MF	**Abdelrahman Moustafa**	5 April 1997 (aged 22)	(Qatar Football Association) Al-Ahli
18	DF	Ahmed Al-Minhali	5 May 1999 (aged 20)	(Qatar Football Association) Al-Sailiya
19	FW	Abdulrasheed Umaru	12 August 1999 (aged 20)	(Qatar Football Association) Al-Ahli
20	FW	**Khalid Muneer**	24 February 1998 (aged 21)	(Qatar Football Association) Al-Wakrah
21	GK	Yazan Naim	5 June 1997 (aged 22)	(Qatar Football Association) Umm Salal
22	GK	**Mohammed Al-Bakri**	28 March 1997 (aged 22)	(Qatar Football Association) Al-Shahania
23	DF	**Homam Ahmed**	25 August 1999 (aged 20)	(Qatar Football Association) Al-Gharafa

=== Japan ===
Coach: Hajime Moriyasu

The final squad was announced on 29 December 2019.

No.	Pos.	Player	Date of birth (age)	Club
1	GK	Ryosuke Kojima	30 January 1997 (aged 22)	(Japan Football Association) Oita Trinita
2	DF	**Yugo Tatsuta**	21 June 1998 (aged 21)	(Japan Football Association) Shimizu S-Pulse
3	DF	**Tsuyoshi Watanabe**	5 February 1997 (aged 22)	(Japan Football Association) FC Tokyo
4	MF	**Daiki Suga**	10 September 1998 (aged 21)	(Japan Football Association) Consadole Sapporo
5	DF	**Daiki Sugioka**	8 September 1998 (aged 21)	(Japan Football Association) Shonan Bellmare
6	MF	Mitsuki Saito	10 January 1999 (aged 20)	(Japan Football Association) Shonan Bellmare
7	MF	**Shunta Tanaka**	26 May 1997 (aged 22)	(Japan Football Association) Osaka University
8	MF	**Ao Tanaka**	10 September 1998 (aged 21)	(Japan Football Association) Kawasaki Frontale
9	FW	**Koki Ogawa**	8 August 1997 (aged 22)	(Japan Football Association) Mito HollyHock
10	MF	Ryotaro Meshino	18 June 1998 (aged 21)	(Scottish Football Association) Heart of Midlothian
11	MF	**Keita Endo**	22 November 1997 (aged 22)	(Japan Football Association) Yokohama F. Marinos
12	GK	**Keisuke Osako**	28 July 1999 (aged 20)	(Japan Football Association) Sanfrecce Hiroshima
13	FW	**Ayase Ueda**	10 September 1998 (aged 21)	(Japan Football Association) Kashima Antlers
14	MF	**Tsukasa Morishima**	25 April 1997 (aged 22)	(Japan Football Association) Sanfrecce Hiroshima
15	DF	Makoto Okazaki	10 October 1998 (aged 21)	(Japan Football Association) FC Tokyo
16	MF	**Yuki Soma**	25 February 1997 (aged 22)	(Japan Football Association) Kashima Antlers
17	DF	**Koki Machida**	25 August 1997 (aged 22)	(Japan Football Association) Kashima Antlers
18	FW	**Kyosuke Tagawa**	11 February 1999 (aged 20)	(Japan Football Association) FC Tokyo
19	MF	**Reo Hatate**	21 November 1997 (aged 22)	(Japan Football Association) Juntendo University
20	DF	**Taiyo Koga**	28 October 1998 (aged 21)	(Japan Football Association) Kashiwa Reysol
21	MF	Taishi Matsumoto	22 April 1998 (aged 21)	(Japan Football Association) Sanfrecce Hiroshima
22	DF	**Daiki Hashioka**	17 May 1999 (aged 20)	(Japan Football Association) Urawa Red Diamonds
23	GK	**Kosei Tani**	22 November 2000 (aged 19)	(Japan Football Association) Gamba Osaka

=== Saudi Arabia ===
Coach: Saad Al-Shehri

The preliminary squad was announced on 14 December 2019. The final squad was announced on 31 December 2019.

No.	Pos.	Player	Date of birth (age)	Club
1	GK	Amin Bukhari	2 May 1997 (aged 22)	(Saudi Arabian Football Federation) Al-Ittihad
2	DF	**Abdullah Hassoun**	19 March 1997 (aged 22)	(Saudi Arabian Football Federation) Al-Ahli
3	DF	Abdulbasit Hindi	2 February 1997 (aged 22)	(Saudi Arabian Football Federation) Al-Ahli
4	DF	**Hassan Al-Tambakti**	9 February 1999 (aged 20)	(Saudi Arabian Football Federation) Al-Wehda
5	DF	**Abdulelah Al-Amri**	15 January 1997 (aged 22)	(Saudi Arabian Football Federation) Al-Nassr
6	MF	**Sami Al-Najei**	7 February 1997 (aged 22)	(Saudi Arabian Football Federation) Damac
7	FW	**Abdulrahman Ghareeb**	31 March 1997 (aged 22)	(Saudi Arabian Football Federation) Al-Ahli
8	MF	Nasser Al Omran	13 July 1997 (aged 22)	(Saudi Arabian Football Federation) Al-Shabab
9	FW	**Abdullah Al-Hamdan**	13 September 1999 (aged 20)	(Saudi Arabian Football Federation) Al-Shabab
10	FW	**Ayman Al-Khulaif**	22 May 1997 (aged 22)	(Saudi Arabian Football Federation) Al-Wehda
11	FW	**Abdulrahman Al-Yami**	19 June 1997 (aged 22)	(Saudi Arabian Football Federation) Al-Hazem
12	FW	**Ayman Yahya**	14 May 2001 (aged 18)	(Saudi Arabian Football Federation) Al-Nassr
13	DF	Khalid Al-Dubaysh	27 November 1998 (aged 21)	(Saudi Arabian Football Federation) Al-Adalah
14	MF	**Ali Al-Hassan**	4 March 1997 (aged 22)	(Saudi Arabian Football Federation) Al-Fateh
15	FW	**Hussain Al-Eisa**	29 December 2000 (aged 19)	(Saudi Arabian Football Federation) Al-Adalah
16	MF	Yousef Al-Harbi	16 March 1997 (aged 22)	(Saudi Arabian Football Federation) Al-Ahli
17	MF	Saad Al-Selouli	25 May 1998 (aged 21)	(Saudi Arabian Football Federation) Al-Ettifaq
18	MF	**Khalid Al-Ghannam**	8 November 2000 (aged 19)	(Saudi Arabian Football Federation) Al-Qadsiah
19	FW	**Firas Al-Buraikan**	14 May 2000 (aged 19)	(Saudi Arabian Football Federation) Al-Nassr
20	MF	**Mukhtar Ali**	30 October 1997 (aged 22)	(Saudi Arabian Football Federation) Al-Nassr
21	GK	Saleh Al Ohaymid	21 May 1998 (aged 21)	(Saudi Arabian Football Federation) Al-Nassr
22	GK	**Mohammed Al-Rubaie**	14 August 1997 (aged 22)	(Saudi Arabian Football Federation) Al-Ahli
23	DF	**Saud Abdulhamid**	18 July 1999 (aged 20)	(Saudi Arabian Football Federation) Al-Ittihad

=== Syria ===
Coach: Ayman Hakeem

The preliminary squad was announced on 28 December 2019. The final squad was announced on 31 December 2019.

No.	Pos.	Player	Date of birth (age)	Club
1	GK	William Ghannam	1 January 1998 (aged 22)	(Syrian Football Association) Al-Wathba
2	DF	Mustafa Safrani	1 January 2001 (aged 19)	(Syrian Football Association) Al-Nawair
3	DF	**Yousef Al-Hamwi**	1 February 1997 (aged 22)	(Syrian Football Association) Al-Jaish
4	DF	**Yosief Mohammad**	1 January 1999 (aged 21)	(Syrian Football Association) Al-Wahda
5	DF	**Fares Arnaout**	31 January 1997 (aged 22)	(Syrian Football Association) Al-Jaish
6	MF	**Kamel Hmeisheh**	1 January 1998 (aged 22)	(Syrian Football Association) Tishreen
7	DF	**Khaled Kurdaghli**	31 January 1997 (aged 22)	(Syrian Football Association) Tishreen
8	MF	Abdulkader Adi	8 January 1998 (aged 22)	(Syrian Football Association) Al-Taliya
9	FW	Abd Al-Rahman Barakat	1 January 1998 (aged 22)	(Syrian Football Association) Al-Wahda
10	FW	Kamel Koaeh	1 January 1998 (aged 22)	(Syrian Football Association) Al-Shorta
11	FW	Anas Alaji	7 January 1998 (aged 22)	(Syrian Football Association) Al-Wahda
12	FW	Milad Hamad	27 January 1997 (aged 22)	(Syrian Football Association) Al-Karamah
13	FW	Mohamad Al-Barri	20 January 1998 (aged 21)	(Syrian Football Association) Al-Shorta
14	MF	Zaid Ghareer	10 January 1998 (aged 21)	(Syrian Football Association) Al-Karamah
15	MF	**Simon Amin**	13 November 1997 (aged 22)	(Swedish Football Association) Örebro SK
16	MF	Khalil Ibrahim	21 January 1997 (aged 22)	(Syrian Football Association) Al-Jazeera
17	MF	**Mohamad Rihanieh**	1 January 2001 (aged 19)	(Syrian Football Association) Al-Ittihad
18	FW	**Mohamad Al-Hallak**	1 January 1999 (aged 21)	(Syrian Football Association) Al-Wahda
19	FW	Abdulhadi Shalha	19 January 1999 (aged 20)	(Syrian Football Association) Al-Wahda
20	MF	Zakria Hannan	21 August 1997 (aged 22)	(Syrian Football Association) Al-Ittihad
21	FW	**Alaa Al Dali**	3 January 1997 (aged 23)	(Syrian Football Association) Tishreen
22	GK	Yazan Ourabi	30 January 1997 (aged 22)	(Syrian Football Association) Al-Jaish
23	GK	Nabil Koro	10 January 2000 (aged 19)	(Syrian Football Association) Al-Jazeera

== Group C ==
=== Uzbekistan ===
Coach: (Serbia) Ljubinko Drulović

The preliminary squad was announced on 15 December 2019. The final squad was announced on 27 December 2019.

No.	Pos.	Player	Date of birth (age)	Club
1	GK	**Abduvohid Nematov**	20 March 2001 (aged 18)	(Uzbekistan Football Association) Nasaf
2	DF	**Islom Kobilov**	1 June 1997 (aged 22)	(Uzbekistan Football Association) Bunyodkor
3	DF	**Khojiakbar Alijonov**	19 April 1997 (aged 22)	(Uzbekistan Football Association) Pakhtakor
4	MF	**Abdulla Abdullaev**	1 September 1997 (aged 22)	(Uzbekistan Football Association) Bunyodkor
5	DF	**Dilshod Saitov**	2 February 1999 (aged 20)	(Uzbekistan Football Association) Nasaf
6	MF	**Azizjon Ganiev**	22 February 1998 (aged 21)	(Uzbekistan Football Association) Nasaf
7	MF	**Sharof Mukhiddinov**	14 July 1997 (aged 22)	(Uzbekistan Football Association) Nasaf
8	MF	**Nurillo Tukhtasinov**	19 February 1997 (aged 22)	(Uzbekistan Football Association) Bunyodkor
9	FW	**Jasurbek Yakhshiboev**	24 June 1997 (aged 22)	(Uzbekistan Football Association) AGMK
10	FW	**Bobur Abdikholikov**	23 April 1997 (aged 22)	(Uzbekistan Football Association) Nasaf
11	FW	Mirjakhon Mirakhmadov	15 July 1997 (aged 22)	(Uzbekistan Football Association) Bunyodkor
12	GK	Mashkhur Mukhammadjonov	21 February 1999 (aged 20)	(Uzbekistan Football Association) Nasaf
13	DF	**Sherzod Nasrullaev**	23 July 1998 (aged 21)	(Uzbekistan Football Association) Nasaf
14	MF	**Abror Ismoilov**	8 January 1998 (aged 22)	(Uzbekistan Football Association) Surkhon
15	MF	Oybek Rustamov	2 April 1997 (aged 22)	(Uzbekistan Football Association) Kokand 1912
16	FW	**Azizbek Amonov**	30 October 1997 (aged 22)	(Uzbekistan Football Association) Lokomotiv
17	FW	**Islom Kenjaboev**	1 September 1999 (aged 20)	(Uzbekistan Football Association) Nasaf
18	FW	**Doston Ibragimov**	23 January 1997 (aged 22)	(Uzbekistan Football Association) Qizilqum
19	DF	Ilkhom Alijanov	5 March 1998 (aged 21)	(Uzbekistan Football Association) Navbahor
20	DF	**Husniddin Aliqulov**	4 April 1999 (aged 20)	(Uzbekistan Football Association) Nasaf
21	GK	Nizomiddin Ziyavutdinov	25 April 1998 (aged 21)	(Uzbekistan Football Association) AGMK
22	FW	**Sanjar Kodirkulov**	27 May 1997 (aged 22)	(Uzbekistan Football Association) Bunyodkor
23	FW	**Oybek Bozorov**	7 August 1997 (aged 22)	(Uzbekistan Football Association) Nasaf

=== South Korea ===
Coach: Kim Hak-bum

The preliminary squad was announced on 3 December 2019. The final squad was announced on 24 December 2019.

No.	Pos.	Player	Date of birth (age)	Club
1	GK	**Song Bum-keun**	15 October 1997 (aged 22)	(Korea Football Association) Jeonbuk Hyundai
2	DF	Lee You-hyeon	8 February 1997 (aged 22)	(Korea Football Association) Jeonnam Dragons
3	DF	Kang Yoon-sung	1 July 1997 (aged 22)	(Korea Football Association) Jeju United
4	DF	Lee Sang-min	1 January 1998 (aged 22)	(Korea Football Association) Ulsan Hyundai
5	DF	Jeong Tae-wook	16 May 1997 (aged 22)	(Korea Football Association) Daegu FC
6	MF	**Kim Dong-hyun**	11 June 1997 (aged 22)	(Korea Football Association) Seongnam FC
7	FW	**Jeong Woo-yeong**	20 September 1999 (aged 20)	(German Football Association) SC Freiburg
8	MF	**Kim Jin-gyu**	24 February 1997 (aged 22)	(Korea Football Association) Busan IPark
9	FW	**Cho Gue-sung**	25 January 1998 (aged 21)	(Korea Football Association) FC Anyang
10	MF	**Lee Dong-gyeong**	20 September 1997 (aged 22)	(Korea Football Association) Ulsan Hyundai
11	FW	**Lee Dong-jun**	1 February 1997 (aged 22)	(Korea Football Association) Busan IPark
12	DF	Kim Jae-woo	6 February 1998 (aged 21)	(Korea Football Association) Bucheon FC 1995
13	MF	Kim Jin-ya	30 June 1998 (aged 21)	(Korea Football Association) FC Seoul
14	FW	Kim Dae-won	10 February 1997 (aged 22)	(Korea Football Association) Daegu FC
15	DF	Kim Tae-hyeon	17 September 2000 (aged 19)	(Korea Football Association) Daejeon Citizen
16	MF	Jeong Seung-won	27 February 1997 (aged 22)	(Korea Football Association) Daegu FC
17	FW	**Um Won-sang**	6 January 1999 (aged 21)	(Korea Football Association) Gwangju FC
18	FW	Oh Se-hun	15 January 1999 (aged 20)	(Korea Football Association) Ulsan Hyundai
19	MF	Maeng Seong-ung	4 February 1998 (aged 21)	(Korea Football Association) FC Anyang
20	MF	**Won Du-jae**	18 November 1997 (aged 22)	(Japan Football Association) Avispa Fukuoka
21	GK	An Chan-gi	6 April 1998 (aged 21)	(Korea Football Association) Incheon National University
22	DF	**Yoon Jong-gyu**	20 March 1998 (aged 21)	(Korea Football Association) FC Seoul
23	GK	Ahn Joon-soo	28 January 1998 (aged 21)	(Japan Football Association) Kagoshima United

=== China PR ===
Coach: Hao Wei

The preliminary squad was announced on 28 November 2019. The final squad was announced on 31 December 2019.

No.	Pos.	Player	Date of birth (age)	Club
1	GK	Li Guanxi	25 September 1998 (aged 21)	(Chinese Football Association) Shandong Luneng
2	DF	Tong Lei	16 December 1997 (aged 22)	(Chinese Football Association) Zhejiang Greentown
3	MF	**Huang Zhengyu**	24 January 1997 (aged 22)	(Chinese Football Association) Guangzhou R&F
4	DF	**Wei Zhen**	12 February 1997 (aged 22)	(Chinese Football Association) Shanghai SIPG
5	DF	**Zhu Chenjie**	23 August 2000 (aged 19)	(Chinese Football Association) Shanghai Shenhua
6	MF	Huang Cong	6 January 1997 (aged 23)	(Chinese Football Association) Shandong Luneng
7	FW	**Yang Liyu**	13 February 1997 (aged 22)	(Chinese Football Association) Guangzhou Evergrande
8	MF	Duan Liuyu	24 July 1998 (aged 21)	(Chinese Football Association) Shandong Luneng
9	FW	**Zhang Yuning**	5 January 1997 (aged 23)	(Chinese Football Association) Beijing Guoan
10	FW	Hu Jinghang	23 March 1997 (aged 22)	(Chinese Football Association) Shanghai SIPG
11	FW	**Chen Binbin**	10 June 1998 (aged 21)	(Chinese Football Association) Shanghai SIPG
12	GK	Chen Wei	14 February 1998 (aged 21)	(Chinese Football Association) Shanghai SIPG
13	FW	Zhou Junchen	23 March 2000 (aged 19)	(Chinese Football Association) Shanghai Shenhua
14	DF	Zhao Jianfei	21 January 1999 (aged 20)	(Chinese Football Association) Shandong Luneng
15	DF	Feng Boxuan	18 March 1997 (aged 22)	(Chinese Football Association) Guangzhou Evergrande
16	DF	Yang Shuai	28 January 1997 (aged 22)	(Chinese Football Association) Chongqing Lifan
17	FW	Liu Ruofan	28 January 1999 (aged 20)	(Chinese Football Association) Shanghai Shenhua
18	DF	**Jiang Shenglong**	24 December 2000 (aged 19)	(Chinese Football Association) Shanghai Shenhua
19	FW	Tian Xin	29 March 1998 (aged 21)	(Chinese Football Association) Shandong Luneng
20	DF	Dilmurat Mawlanyaz	8 April 1998 (aged 21)	(Chinese Football Association) Chongqing Lifan
21	MF	Zhang Lingfeng	28 February 1997 (aged 22)	(Chinese Football Association) Jiangsu Suning
22	GK	Zhang Yan	30 March 1997 (aged 22)	(Chinese Football Association) Jiangsu Suning
23	FW	**Chen Pu**	15 January 1997 (aged 22)	(Chinese Football Association) Shandong Luneng

=== Iran ===
Coach: Hamid Estili

The final squad was announced on 30 December 2019.

No.	Pos.	Player	Date of birth (age)	Club
1	GK	Habib Far Abbasi	4 September 1997 (aged 22)	(Football Federation Islamic Republic of Iran) Naft Masjed Soleyman
2	DF	Hossein Saki	10 May 1997 (aged 22)	(Football Federation Islamic Republic of Iran) Naft Abadan
3	DF	Mehran Derakhshan Mehr	10 August 1998 (aged 21)	(Football Federation Islamic Republic of Iran) Zob Ahan
4	DF	Mojtaba Najjarian	25 January 1998 (aged 21)	(Football Federation Islamic Republic of Iran) Foolad
5	DF	Shahin Taherkhani	7 January 1997 (aged 23)	(Football Federation Islamic Republic of Iran) Esteghlal
6	MF	Sina Zamehran	10 March 1997 (aged 22)	(Football Federation Islamic Republic of Iran) Shahr Khodro
7	FW	Amir Roostaei	5 August 1997 (aged 22)	(Football Federation Islamic Republic of Iran) Persepolis
8	MF	Mehdi Mehdikhani	28 July 1997 (aged 22)	(Croatian Football Federation) Varaždin
9	FW	**Allahyar Sayyadmanesh**	29 June 2001 (aged 18)	(Turkish Football Federation) İstanbulspor
10	MF	Reza Shekari	31 May 1998 (aged 21)	(Football Federation Islamic Republic of Iran) Tractor
11	FW	**Mehdi Ghaedi**	5 December 1998 (aged 21)	(Football Federation Islamic Republic of Iran) Esteghlal
12	GK	Meraj Esmaeili	13 January 2000 (aged 19)	(Football Federation Islamic Republic of Iran) Zob Ahan
13	MF	**Amir Hosseinzadeh**	30 October 2000 (aged 19)	(Football Federation Islamic Republic of Iran) Saipa
14	FW	Reza Jabireh	7 July 1997 (aged 22)	(Football Federation Islamic Republic of Iran) Naft Abadan
15	MF	Reza Dehghani	7 January 1998 (aged 22)	(Football Federation Islamic Republic of Iran) Nassaji Mazandaran
16	MF	**Mohammad Mohebi**	20 December 1998 (aged 21)	(Football Federation Islamic Republic of Iran) Sepahan
17	MF	**Jafar Salmani**	12 January 1997 (aged 22)	(Football Federation Islamic Republic of Iran) Naft Abadan
18	FW	Ali Shojaei	27 January 1997 (aged 22)	(Football Federation Islamic Republic of Iran) Nassaji Mazandaran
19	MF	Matin Karimzadeh	1 July 1998 (aged 21)	(Football Federation Islamic Republic of Iran) Pars Jonoubi Jam
20	MF	Mohammad Khodabandelou	7 September 1999 (aged 20)	(Football Federation Islamic Republic of Iran) Paykan
21	DF	**Omid Noorafkan**	9 April 1997 (aged 22)	(Football Federation Islamic Republic of Iran) Sepahan
22	GK	Mehdi Nourollahi	24 March 1997 (aged 22)	(Football Federation Islamic Republic of Iran) Saipa
23	DF	**Aref Aghasi**	2 January 1997 (aged 23)	(Football Federation Islamic Republic of Iran) Foolad

== Group D ==
=== Vietnam ===
Coach: (South Korea) Park Hang-seo

The preliminary squad was announced on 12 December 2019. The final squad was announced on 6 January 2020.

No.	Pos.	Player	Date of birth (age)	Club
1	GK	**Bùi Tiến Dũng II**	28 February 1997 (aged 22)	(Vietnam Football Federation) Ho Chi Minh City
2	DF	Đỗ Thanh Thịnh	18 August 1998 (aged 21)	(Vietnam Football Federation) SHB Đà Nẵng
3	DF	Huỳnh Tấn Sinh	6 April 1998 (aged 21)	(Vietnam Football Federation) Quảng Nam
4	DF	**Hồ Tấn Tài**	6 November 1997 (aged 22)	(Vietnam Football Federation) Becamex Bình Dương
5	DF	**Nguyễn Đức Chiến**	24 August 1998 (aged 21)	(Vietnam Football Federation) Viettel
6	DF	**Lê Ngọc Bảo**	29 March 1998 (aged 21)	(Vietnam Football Federation) Phố Hiến
7	MF	**Triệu Việt Hưng**	19 January 1997 (aged 22)	(Vietnam Football Federation) HAGL
8	MF	Trần Thanh Sơn	30 December 1997 (aged 22)	(Vietnam Football Federation) HAGL
9	FW	**Hà Đức Chinh**	22 September 1997 (aged 22)	(Vietnam Football Federation) SHB Đà Nẵng
10	MF	Nguyễn Hữu Thắng	19 May 2000 (aged 19)	(Vietnam Football Federation) Viettel
11	MF	Nguyễn Trọng Hùng	3 October 1997 (aged 22)	(Vietnam Football Federation) Thanh Hóa
12	MF	**Trương Văn Thái Quý**	22 August 1997 (aged 22)	(Vietnam Football Federation) Hanoi
13	FW	**Nhâm Mạnh Dũng**	12 April 2000 (aged 19)	(Vietnam Football Federation) Viettel
14	MF	**Nguyễn Hoàng Đức**	11 January 1998 (aged 21)	(Vietnam Football Federation) Viettel
15	DF	Bùi Tiến Dụng	23 November 1998 (aged 21)	(Vietnam Football Federation) SHB Đà Nẵng
16	DF	**Nguyễn Thành Chung**	8 September 1997 (aged 22)	(Vietnam Football Federation) Hanoi
17	MF	Trần Bảo Toàn	14 July 2000 (aged 19)	(Vietnam Football Federation) HAGL
18	GK	**Nguyễn Văn Toản**	26 November 1999 (aged 20)	(Vietnam Football Federation) Hải Phòng
19	MF	**Nguyễn Quang Hải** (captain)	12 April 1997 (aged 22)	(Vietnam Football Federation) Hanoi
20	DF	**Bùi Hoàng Việt Anh**	1 January 1999 (aged 21)	(Vietnam Football Federation) Hanoi
21	DF	**Trần Đình Trọng**	25 April 1997 (aged 22)	(Vietnam Football Federation) Hanoi
22	FW	**Nguyễn Tiến Linh**	20 October 1997 (aged 22)	(Vietnam Football Federation) Becamex Bình Dương
23	GK	Y Êli Niê	8 January 2001 (aged 19)	(Vietnam Football Federation) Đắk Lắk

=== North Korea ===
Coach: Ri Yu-il

No.	Pos.	Player	Date of birth (age)	Club
1	GK	**Kang Ju-hyok**	31 May 1997 (aged 22)	(DPR Korea Football Association) Hwaebul
2	DF	Pak Chol-ju	1 January 1999 (aged 21)	(DPR Korea Football Association) Sonbong
3	DF	Pak Kwang-chon	12 January 1999 (aged 20)	(DPR Korea Football Association) Ryomyong
4	MF	So Jong-gil	9 March 1998 (aged 21)	(DPR Korea Football Association) Kigwancha
5	DF	Jang Song-il	21 March 1998 (aged 21)	(DPR Korea Football Association) Ryomyong
6	DF	**Choe Jin-nam**	20 November 1998 (aged 21)	(DPR Korea Football Association) Ryomyong
7	MF	Ri Chung-gyu	30 September 1998 (aged 21)	(DPR Korea Football Association) Kigwancha
8	DF	Jong Kum-song	24 January 1997 (aged 22)	(DPR Korea Football Association) Rimyongsu
9	MF	Kim Kwang-hyok	24 March 1997 (aged 22)	(DPR Korea Football Association) Sobaeksu
10	MF	**Kim Kum-chol**	7 April 1997 (aged 22)	(DPR Korea Football Association) Rimyongsu
11	MF	Pak Kwang-hun	18 April 1997 (aged 22)	(DPR Korea Football Association) Rimyongsu
12	MF	**Kang Kuk-chol**	29 September 1999 (aged 20)	(DPR Korea Football Association) Rimyongsu
13	FW	Sim Ju-il	23 February 2000 (aged 19)	(DPR Korea Football Association) Amnokgang
14	MF	**Choe Ok-chol**	11 November 1998 (aged 21)	(DPR Korea Football Association) Kigwancha
15	MF	Ryang Hyon-ju	31 May 1998 (aged 21)	(Japan Football Association) Waseda University
16	MF	**Mun In-ju**	22 August 1999 (aged 20)	(Japan Football Association) Korea University
17	DF	Ri Yong-gwon	3 March 1998 (aged 21)	(DPR Korea Football Association) Hwaebul
18	GK	**Kim Ju-song**	13 November 1999 (aged 20)	(DPR Korea Football Association) Sobaeksu
19	MF	Kim Kyong-sok	19 February 2000 (aged 19)	(DPR Korea Football Association) Sonbong
21	GK	Ri Chol-song	13 March 1998 (aged 21)	(DPR Korea Football Association) Ryomyong
22	FW	**Kim Kuk-jin**	11 October 2000 (aged 19)	(DPR Korea Football Association) Kigwancha
23	FW	Kim Hwi-hwang	25 January 2000 (aged 19)	(DPR Korea Football Association) Sonbong

=== Jordan ===
Coach: Ahmed Abdel-Qader

The final squad was announced on 20 December 2019.

No.	Pos.	Player	Date of birth (age)	Club
1	GK	**Abdallah Al-Fakhouri**	22 January 2000 (aged 19)	(Jordan Football Association) Al-Wehdat
2	DF	Ihab Al-Khawaldeh	11 March 1997 (aged 22)	(Jordan Football Association) FC Ma'an
3	DF	Yazan Abdela'al	7 January 1999 (aged 21)	(Jordan Football Association) FC Ma'an
4	DF	Ahmad Haikal	2 April 1997 (aged 22)	(Jordan Football Association) Al-Wehdat
5	DF	**Hadi Al-Hourani**	14 March 2000 (aged 19)	(Jordan Football Association) Al-Ramtha
6	DF	Danial Afaneh	24 March 2001 (aged 18)	(Jordan Football Association) Al-Wehdat
7	MF	**Omar Hani**	27 June 1999 (aged 20)	(Cyprus Football Association) APOEL
8	MF	**Noor Al-Rawabdeh**	24 February 1997 (aged 22)	(Jordan Football Association) Al-Jazeera
9	MF	**Mohammad Bani Atieh**	13 February 1999 (aged 20)	(Jordan Football Association) Al-Faisaly
10	MF	**Musa Al-Taamari**	10 June 1997 (aged 22)	(Cyprus Football Association) APOEL
11	MF	Mohammad Masheh	30 January 1997 (aged 22)	(Jordan Football Association) Shabab Al-Ordon
12	GK	Ahmad Al-Juaidi	9 April 2001 (aged 18)	(Jordan Football Association) Shabab Al-Ordon
13	DF	Shoqi Al-Quz'a	14 January 1999 (aged 20)	(Jordan Football Association) Shabab Al-Ordon
14	FW	**Ali Olwan**	26 March 2000 (aged 19)	(Jordan Football Association) Al-Jazeera
15	DF	Saed Al-Rosan	1 February 1997 (aged 22)	(Jordan Football Association) FC Ma'an
16	MF	**Nizar Al-Rashdan**	23 March 1999 (aged 20)	(Jordan Football Association) Al-Hussein
17	FW	Mohammad Aburiziq	1 February 1999 (aged 20)	(Jordan Football Association) Al-Baqa'a
18	MF	**Ibrahim Sadeh**	27 April 2000 (aged 19)	(Jordan Football Association) Al-Jazeera
19	FW	**Yazan Al-Naimat**	4 June 1999 (aged 20)	(Jordan Football Association) Shabab Al-Ordon
20	FW	**Mohammad Al-Zu'bi**	15 April 1999 (aged 20)	(Jordan Football Association) Al-Ramtha
21	MF	**Ward Al-Barri**	29 June 1997 (aged 22)	(Jordan Football Association) Shabab Al-Ordon
22	GK	Ra'fat Al-Rabie	31 July 1997 (aged 22)	(Jordan Football Association) Al-Ramtha
23	FW	Mo'ath Al-Ammouri	29 August 1999 (aged 20)	(Jordan Football Association) Al-Wehdat

=== United Arab Emirates ===
Coach: (Poland) Maciej Skorża

The preliminary squad was announced on 31 December 2019.

No.	Pos.	Player	Date of birth (age)	Club
1	GK	**Mohamed Al-Shamsi**	4 January 1997 (aged 23)	(United Arab Emirates Football Association) Al-Wahda
2	DF	Hamdan Nasser	24 April 1997 (aged 22)	(United Arab Emirates Football Association) Al-Ittihad Kalba
3	DF	**Mohammed Ali Shaker**	27 April 1997 (aged 22)	(United Arab Emirates Football Association) Al-Ain
4	MF	**Mohammed Al Attas**	5 August 1997 (aged 22)	(United Arab Emirates Football Association) Al-Jazira
5	DF	**Khalifa Al-Hammadi**	7 November 1998 (aged 21)	(United Arab Emirates Football Association) Al-Jazira
6	MF	**Majed Suroor**	14 October 1997 (aged 22)	(United Arab Emirates Football Association) Al-Sharjah
7	FW	**Zaid Al-Ameri**	14 January 1997 (aged 22)	(United Arab Emirates Football Association) Al-Jazira
8	MF	**Tahnoon Al-Zaabi**	10 April 1999 (aged 20)	(United Arab Emirates Football Association) Al-Wahda
9	MF	**Ali Saleh**	22 January 2000 (aged 19)	(United Arab Emirates Football Association) Al-Wasl
10	MF	**Jassem Yaqoub**	16 March 1997 (aged 22)	(United Arab Emirates Football Association) Al-Nasr
11	FW	Mohammed Al-Hammadi	11 May 1997 (aged 22)	(United Arab Emirates Football Association) Baniyas
12	DF	**Khaled Ibrahim**	17 January 1997 (aged 22)	(United Arab Emirates Football Association) Baniyas
13	MF	**Abdullah Ramadan**	7 March 1998 (aged 21)	(United Arab Emirates Football Association) Al-Jazira
14	DF	**Abdulrahman Saleh**	3 June 1999 (aged 20)	(United Arab Emirates Football Association) Al-Wasl
15	MF	Khalfan Hassan	7 January 1999 (aged 21)	(United Arab Emirates Football Association) Shabab Al-Ahli
16	MF	**Yahia Nader**	11 September 1998 (aged 21)	(United Arab Emirates Football Association) Al-Ain
17	GK	Khalid Abdulrahman	18 April 1997 (aged 22)	(United Arab Emirates Football Association) Baniyas
18	MF	**Majed Rashed**	16 May 2000 (aged 19)	(United Arab Emirates Football Association) Al-Ittihad Kalba
19	FW	Ali Eid	1 March 1998 (aged 21)	(United Arab Emirates Football Association) Al-Ain
20	MF	**Yahya Al Ghassani**	18 April 1998 (aged 21)	(United Arab Emirates Football Association) Al-Wahda
21	MF	Eid Khamis	20 May 1999 (aged 20)	(United Arab Emirates Football Association) Shabab Al-Ahli
22	GK	Abdulrahman Al-Ameri	30 April 1998 (aged 21)	(United Arab Emirates Football Association) Al-Jazira
23	DF	Saeed Suwaidan	19 May 1997 (aged 22)	(United Arab Emirates Football Association) Al-Nasr
