= Palestine national under-23 football team results =

This is a list of the Palestine national under-23 football team results from 2002 to present.

=== 2002 ===
4 April 2002 West Asian Games	Iran	2–2	Palestine	Kuwait City, Kuwait
				Stadium: Mohammed Al-Hamad Stadium

6 April 2002 West Asian Games	Palestine	2–0	Qatar	Kuwait City, Kuwait
				Stadium: Mohammed Al-Hamad Stadium

8 April 2002 West Asian Games	Syria	2–1	Palestine	Kuwait City, Kuwait
				Stadium: Mohammed Al-Hamad Stadium

10 April 2002 West Asian Games	Kuwait	7–0	Palestine	Kuwait City, Kuwait
				Stadium: Mohammed Al-Hamad Stadium

28 September 2002 Asian Games	Palestine	0–2	Japan	Yangsan, South Korea
				Stadium: Yangsan Stadium

1 October 2002 Asian Games	Uzbekistan	2–0	Palestine	Yangsan, South Korea
				Stadium: Yangsan Stadium

5 October 2002 Asian Games	Bahrain	5–0	Palestine	Changwon, South Korea
				Stadium: Changwon Stadium

=== 2003 ===
12 April 2003 2004 Summer Olympics qualifiers	Nepal	0–1	Palestine	Nepal

14 April 2003 2004 Summer Olympics qualifiers	Palestine	2–1	Nepal	Jordan

3 May 2003 2004 Summer Olympics qualifiers	Kuwait	1–1	Palestine	Kuwait

7 June 2003 2004 Summer Olympics qualifiers	Palestine	1–2	Kuwait	Jordan

=== 2006 ===
28 November 2006 Asian Games	Thailand	1–0	Palestine	Al-Rayyan, Qatar
				Stadium: Al-Rayyan Stadium; Attendance: 501

2 December 2006 Asian Games	Kuwait	2–0	Palestine	Al-Rayyan, Qatar
				Stadium: Al-Rayyan Stadium; Attendance: 296

5 December 2006 Asian Games	Palestine	0–3	Kyrgyzstan	Al-Rayyan, Qatar
				Stadium: Al-Rayyan Stadium; Attendance: 412

=== 2007 ===
7 February 2007 2008 Summer Olympics qualifiers	Yemen	2–1	Palestine	Sanaa, Yemen
16:00				Stadium: Althawra Sports City Stadium; Attendance: 7,000

14 February 2007 2008 Summer Olympics qualifiers	Palestine	1–1	Yemen	Dubai, United Arab Emirates
17:00				Stadium: Al-Maktoum Stadium; Attendance: 800

=== 2009 ===
10 September 2009 Friendly	Palestine	0–0	Jordan	Hebron, Palestine
				Stadium: Hussein Bin Ali Stadium

18 November 2009 Friendly	Palestine	1–3	Tunisia	Al-Ram, Palestine
				Stadium: Faisal Al-Husseini International Stadium

23 November 2009 Friendly	Jordan	1–2	Palestine	Amman, Jordan
				Stadium: King Abdullah II Stadium

=== 2010 ===
13 January 2010 Friendly	Tunisia	1–0	Palestine	Hammam Sousse, Tunisia
	90+'			Stadium: Stade Municipal Bou Ali-Lahouar

16 January 2010 Friendly	Tunisia	1–0	Palestine	Bizerte, Tunisia
	Sassi 40'			Stadium: Stade 15 Octobre

5 October 2010 Jerusalem Trophy	Palestine	2–0	Jordan	Al-Ram, Palestine
	Nu'man 40'; Abu Gharqoud 69'			Stadium: Faisal Al-Husseini International Stadium; Attendance: 7,000

8 November 2010 Asian Games	Palestine	0–0	Jordan	Guangzhou, China
				Stadium: Ying Tung Stadium; Attendance: 3,682

10 November 2010 Asian Games	Palestine	0–3	North Korea	Guangzhou, China
				Stadium: Ying Tung Stadium; Attendance: 4,168

13 November 2010 Asian Games	South Korea	3–0	Palestine	Guangzhou, China
				Stadium: Yuexiushan Stadium; Attendance: 11,000

=== 2011 ===
23 February 2011 2012 Summer Olympics qualifiers	Thailand	0–3; Awarded	Palestine	Bangkok, Thailand
18:00				Stadium: Suphachalasai Stadium; Attendance: 6,000

9 March 2011 2012 Summer Olympics qualifiers	Palestine	1–0 (a.e.t.) (5–6 p)	Thailand	Al-Ram, Palestine
18:00				Stadium: Faisal Al-Husseini International Stadium; Attendance: 16,000

16 March 2011 Friendly	Kuwait	2–0	Palestine	Kuwait City, Kuwait
	Aman 29'; Haidar 36'			Stadium: Mohammed Al-Hamad Stadium

12 June 2011 Friendly	Palestine	3–0	Italy	Hebron, Palestine
	Salem 15', 60'; El-Khatib 75'			Stadium: Dora International Stadium

19 June 2011 2012 Summer Olympics qualifiers	Bahrain	0–1	Palestine	Riffa, Bahrain
19:00				Stadium: Bahrain National Stadium; Attendance: 300

23 June 2011 2012 Summer Olympics qualifiers	Palestine	1–2	Bahrain	Al-Ram, Palestine
17:00				Stadium: Faisal Al-Husseini International Stadium; Attendance: 15,000

=== 2012 ===
23 June 2012 2013 AFC U-22 Championship qualification	Palestine	1–1	Sri Lanka	Riyadh, Saudi Arabia
				Stadium: King Fahd International Stadium

25 June 2012 2013 AFC U-22 Championship qualification	Syria	2–1	Palestine	Riyadh, Saudi Arabia
				Stadium: King Fahd International Stadium

28 June 2012 2013 AFC U-22 Championship qualification	Saudi Arabia	4–0	Palestine	Riyadh, Saudi Arabia
				Stadium: King Fahd International Stadium

30 June 2012 2013 AFC U-22 Championship qualification	Palestine	0–0	Kyrgyzstan	Riyadh, Saudi Arabia
				Stadium: Prince Faisal bin Fahd Stadium

3 July 2012 2013 AFC U-22 Championship qualification	Pakistan	0–1	Palestine	Riyadh, Saudi Arabia
				Stadium: Prince Faisal bin Fahd Stadium

=== 2013 ===
23 September 2013 Islamic Solidarity Games	Morocco	3–1	Palestine	Palembang, Indonesia
19:00				Stadium: Gelora Sriwijaya Stadium; Referee: Phung Dinh Dung (Vietnam)

25 September 2013 Islamic Solidarity Games	Palestine	2–1	Indonesia	Palembang, Indonesia
20:45	Ashraf Nu'man 16', 62' (pen.)		Sunarto 30' (pen.)	Stadium: Gelora Sriwijaya Stadium; Referee: Safwan Othman (Syria)

=== 2014 ===
10 May 2014 Palestine International Championship	Palestine	1–0	Jordan	Hebron, Palestine
18:30				Stadium: Dora International Stadium

14 May 2014 Palestine International Championship	Palestine	3–0	Sri Lanka	Nablus, Palestine
20:00				Stadium: Nablus Football Stadium

17 May 2014 Palestine International Championship	Palestine	3–0	Pakistan	Al-Ram, Palestine
20:00				Stadium: Faisal Al-Husseini International Stadium

20 May 2014 Palestine International Championship	Palestine	1–0	Jordan	Hebron, Palestine
19:00				Stadium: Hussein Bin Ali Stadium

6 September 2014 Friendly	Palestine	0–3	Brazil	Doha, Qatar
			[[]] 66' (pen.); [[]] 69'; [[]] 87'	Stadium: Thani bin Jassim Stadium

14 September 2014 Asian Games	Oman	0–2	Palestine	Ansan, South Korea
17:00				Stadium: Ansan Wa~ Stadium

17 September 2014 Asian Games	Palestine	2–1	Tajikistan	Hwaseong, South Korea
17:00				Stadium: Hwaseong Stadium

21 September 2014 Asian Games	Palestine	1–2	Singapore	Ansan, South Korea
17:00				Stadium: Ansan Wa~ Stadium

25 September 2014 Asian Games	Palestine	0–4	Japan	Hwaseong, South Korea
17:00				Stadium: Hwaseong Stadium

=== 2015 ===
23 March 2015 2016 AFC U-23 Championship qualification	Afghanistan	0–2	Palestine	Tehran, Iran
15:00				Stadium: Shahid Dastgerdi Stadium; Attendance: 3,500

25 March 2015 2016 AFC U-23 Championship qualification	Palestine	0–1	Saudi Arabia	Tehran, Iran
15:00				Stadium: Shahid Dastgerdi Stadium; Attendance: 50

27 March 2015 2016 AFC U-23 Championship qualification	Iran	3–0	Palestine	Tehran, Iran
17:00				Stadium: Azadi Stadium; Attendance: 550

31 March 2015 2016 AFC U-23 Championship qualification	Palestine	4–0	Nepal	Tehran, Iran
15:00				Stadium: Shahid Dastgerdi Stadium; Attendance: 40

30 September 2015 WAFF Championship	Qatar	3–0	Palestine	Doha, Qatar
				Stadium: Abdullah bin Khalifa Stadium; Attendance: 700

3 October 2015 WAFF Championship	Palestine	1–3	Yemen	Doha, Qatar
				Stadium: Abdullah bin Khalifa Stadium; Attendance: 500

6 October 2015 WAFF Championship	Jordan	0–1	Palestine	Doha, Qatar
				Stadium: Abdullah bin Khalifa Stadium; Attendance: 200

=== 2016 ===
8 May 2017 Islamic Solidarity Games	Palestine	2–2	Oman	Baku, Azerbaijan
16:30	Dabbagh 5', 54'		Awlad Wadi 48', 86'	Stadium: AZAL Arena; Referee: Andrei Ceban (Moldova)

11 May 2017 Islamic Solidarity Games	Palestine	0–1	Algeria	Baku, Azerbaijan
16:30			El Melali 63' (pen.)	Stadium: AZAL Arena; Referee: Mykola Balakin (Ukraine)

15 May 2017 Islamic Solidarity Games	Turkey	4–3	Palestine	Baku, Azerbaijan
12:30	Aksu 44', 81'; Okutan 63'; Antalyali 71'		Dabbagh 23'; Maraaba 29'; Batran 33'	Stadium: AZAL Arena; Referee: Mykola Balakin (Ukraine)

19 July 2017 2018 AFC U-23 Championship qualification	Tajikistan	2–2	Palestine	Hebron, Palestine
19:30				Stadium: Dora International Stadium; Attendance: 700

21 July 2017 2018 AFC U-23 Championship qualification	Palestine	3–2	Jordan	Hebron, Palestine
19:30				Stadium: Dora International Stadium; Attendance: 700

23 July 2017 2018 AFC U-23 Championship qualification	Palestine	3–0	Bangladesh	Hebron, Palestine
19:30				Stadium: Dora International Stadium; Attendance: 500

12 December 2017 Friendly	Oman	1–0	Palestine	Muscat, Oman
	Al-Ghassani			Stadium: Sultan Qaboos Sports Complex

15 December 2017 Friendly	Oman	1–1	Palestine	Muscat, Oman
	Al Hudhaify 25'		Al Qayed 48'	Stadium: Sultan Qaboos Sports Complex

29 December 2017 Friendly	Qatar	2–3	Palestine	Doha, Qatar

=== 2018 ===
10 January 2018 Asian Cup	Japan	1–0	Palestine	Jiangyin, China
19:30	Itakura 20'			Stadium: Jiangyin Stadium; Attendance: 360; Referee: Fu Ming (China)

13 January 2018 Asian Cup	Palestine	1–1	North Korea	Jiangyin, China
16:00	Dabbagh 16'		Basim 74' (o.g.)	Stadium: Jiangyin Stadium; Attendance: 560; Referee: Peter Green (Australia)

16 January 2018 Asian Cup	Thailand	1–5	Palestine	Changzhou, China
16:00	Chenrop 44'		Fannoun 15'; Dabbagh 26'; Yousef 30'; Darwish 32'; Qumbor 88'	Stadium: Changzhou Olympic Sports Centre; Attendance: 120; Referee: Nawaf Shukralla (Bahrain)

19 January 2018 Asian Cup	Qatar	3–2	Palestine	Changzhou, China
19:30	Almoez Ali 32', 34'; Hashim Ali 53'		Dabbagh 60'; Darwish 87'	Stadium: Changzhou Olympic Sports Centre; Attendance: 226; Referee: Hettikamkanamge Perera (Sri Lanka)

5 May 2018 Friendly	Qatar	0–3	Palestine	Doha, Qatar

3 August 2018 2018 Vinaphone Cup	Vietnam	2–1	Palestine	Hanoi, Vietnam
19:30				Stadium: Mỹ Đình National Stadium

5 August 2018 2018 Vinaphone Cup	Palestine	2–1	Uzbekistan	Hanoi, Vietnam
16:30				Stadium: Mỹ Đình National Stadium

7 August 2018 2018 Vinaphone Cup	Palestine	1–1	Oman	Hanoi, Vietnam
16:30				Stadium: Mỹ Đình National Stadium

10 August 2018 Asian Games	Palestine	0–0	Chinese Taipei	Bekasi, Indonesia
19:00				Stadium: Patriot Candrabhaga Stadium

12 August 2018 Asian Games	Palestine	2–1	Laos	Bekasi, Indonesia
16:00				Stadium: Patriot Candrabhaga Stadium

15 August 2018 Asian Games	Indonesia	1–2	Palestine	Bekasi, Indonesia
19:00				Stadium: Patriot Candrabhaga Stadium

17 August 2018 Asian Games	Hong Kong	1–1	Palestine	Bekasi, Indonesia
16:00				Stadium: Patriot Candrabhaga Stadium

23 August 2018 Asian Games	Palestine	0–1	Syria	Bekasi, Indonesia
16:00				Stadium: Patriot Candrabhaga Stadium; Referee: Ali Shaban (Kuwait)

=== 2019 ===
10 January 2019 Friendly	Kuwait	1–0	Palestine	Kuwait City, Kuwait
	Al Rashidi 31'			Stadium: Al-Sadaqua Walsalam Stadium

13 January 2019 Friendly	Jordan	3–2	Palestine	Amman, Jordan
				Stadium: King Abdullah II Stadium

16 January 2019 Friendly	Jordan	1–2	Palestine	Amman, Jordan
	Goal		47', 51'	Stadium: King Abdullah II Stadium

22 March 2019 2020 AFC U-23 Championship qualification	Palestine	9–0	Sri Lanka	Isa Town, Bahrain
16:00	Al-Iwisat 7'; Emghamis 10', 30'; Dabbagh 24'; Iraqi 60'; Salma 68'; Farawi 70' (pen.); Dahla 72' (pen.); Abdelsalam 79'			Stadium: Khalifa Sports City Stadium; Attendance: 1,162; Referee: Kim Dae-yong (South Korea)

24 March 2019 2020 AFC U-23 Championship qualification	Bangladesh	0–1	Palestine	Isa Town, Bahrain
16:00			Abdallah 22'	Stadium: Khalifa Sports City Stadium; Attendance: 2,583; Referee: Mohd Amirul Izwan Yaacob (Malaysia)

26 March 2019 2020 AFC U-23 Championship qualification	Palestine	0–2	Bahrain	Isa Town, Bahrain
			Al-Hardan 78' (pen.); Al-Sherooqi 89'	Stadium: Khalifa Sports City Stadium; Attendance: 4,140; Referee: Jumpei Iida (Japan)

16 June 2019 Friendly	Palestine	Cancelled	Egypt	Al-Ram, Palestine
				Stadium: Faisal Al-Husseini International Stadium
Note: The match was cancelled after the Israeli authorities delayed issuing entry permits to the Egyptian delegation.

=== 2021 ===
25 June 2021 Friendly	La Viena FC (Egypt)	1–2	Palestine	Cairo, Egypt
			Goal

26 June 2021 Friendly	Misr Lel Makkasa (Egypt)	0–1	Palestine	Cairo, Egypt
		Report	Deriya

27 June 2021 Friendly	Al-Amal (Egypt)	4–1	Palestine	Cairo, Egypt
			Hamed	Stadium: Abdel-Latif Abu-Rajelha Stadium

29 June 2021 Friendly	Ismaily (Egypt)	0–0	Palestine	Cairo, Egypt
				Stadium: Ismailia Stadium

4 October 2021 2021 WAFF U-23 Championship	Palestine	0–1	Iraq	Dammam, Saudi Arabia
15:30			Abdulkareem 81'	Stadium: Prince Mohamed bin Fahd Stadium; Referee: Mokhtar Al-Arami (Yemen)

6 October 2021 2021 WAFF U-23 Championship	Lebanon	2–4	Palestine	Dammam, Saudi Arabia
20:45	Nasser 28'; Bader 62'		Direya 6', 12', 71'; Al-Nabrisi 47'	Stadium: Prince Mohamed bin Fahd Stadium; Referee: Mohammad Deham (Bahrain)

8 October 2021 2021 WAFF U-23 Championship	Palestine	1–0	United Arab Emirates	Dammam, Saudi Arabia
15:30	Mousa 16'	Report		Stadium: Prince Mohamed bin Fahd Stadium; Referee: Faisal Al-Blwi (Saudi Arabia)

28 October 2021 2022 AFC U-23 Asian Cup qualification	Palestine	1–3	Turkmenistan	Amman, Jordan
19:00	Mousa 47'	Report	Hydyrow 18', 64'; Ballakow 88'	Stadium: King Abdullah II Stadium; Attendance: 73; Referee: Muhammad Taqi (Singapore)

31 October 2021 2022 AFC U-23 Asian Cup qualification	Jordan	1–1	Palestine	Amman, Jordan
19:00	Al-Naimat 48'	Report	Mohammed 77'	Stadium: King Abdullah II Stadium; Attendance: 850; Referee: Bijan Heidari (Iran)

=== 2022 ===
22 May 2022 Friendly	Algeria	3–1	Palestine	Algiers, Algeria
				Stadium: 5 July 1962 Stadium

25 May 2022 Friendly	Algeria	2–0	Palestine	Blida, Algeria
				Stadium: Mustapha Tchaker Stadium

31 May 2022 Friendly	Tunisia	1–1	Palestine	Tunis, Tunisia
	Snana 65'		Rabei 43'	Stadium: Stade El Menzah

5 June 2022 Friendly	Tunisia	2–1	Palestine	Tunis, Tunisia
16:00				Stadium: Stade El Menzah

19 November 2022 Friendly	Kuwait	1–2	Palestine	Al Ahmadi, Kuwait
18:30	Al Enezi		Nabhan; Dgheim (pen.)

22 November 2022 Friendly	Kuwait	0–0	Palestine	Al Ahmadi, Kuwait

20 December 2022 Friendly	Jordan	1–0	Palestine	Amman
15:00				Stadium: Petra Stadium

23 December 2022 Friendly	Jordan	2–2	Palestine	Amman
14:00				Stadium: Petra Stadium

=== 2023 ===
14 May 2023 Friendly	Palestine	1–2	Jordan	Bethlehem
	Rabei			Stadium: Al-Khader Stadium

8 June 2023 Friendly	Jordan	0–0	Palestine	Jordan

12 June 2023 2023 WAFF U-23 Championship	Syria	0–1	Palestine	Karbala, Iraq
19:45			Yousef 37'	Stadium: Karbala Stadium

16 June 2023 2023 WAFF U-23 Championship	Palestine	1–1	Iran	Karbala, Iraq
19:45	Qunbar 62'		Barzegar 90+7'	Stadium: Karbala Stadium; Referee: Ahmed Salim (Yemen)

2 July 2023 2023 Pan Arab Games	Palestine	1–1	Mauritania	Constantine, Algeria
21:00	Rabei 5'		Al-Sheikh 24'	Stadium: Mohamed Hamlaoui Stadium

5 July 2023 2023 Pan Arab Games	Syria	0–0	Palestine	Constantine, Algeria
17:30		Report		Stadium: Mohamed Hamlaoui Stadium; Referee: Mohamed Khaled (Bahrain)

8 July 2023 2023 Pan Arab Games	Saudi Arabia	2–1	Palestine	Constantine, Algeria
17:30	Al-Abdulwahed 37'; Al-Hassan 62'	Report	Bani Odeh 40'	Stadium: Mohamed Hamlaoui Stadium; Referee: Nabil Boukhalfa (Algeria)

6 September 2023 2024 AFC U-23 Asian Cup qualification	Bahrain	0–1	Palestine	Arad, Bahrain
18:30 UTC+3		Report	Qunbar 90+1'	Stadium: Al Muharraq Stadium

9 September 2023 2024 AFC U-23 Asian Cup qualification	Palestine	0–1	Japan	Arad, Bahrain
21:30 UTC+3		Report	Fujio 23'	Stadium: Al Muharraq Stadium; Attendance: 51; Referee: Ahmed Eisa Darwish (United Arab Emirates)

12 September 2023 2024 AFC U-23 Asian Cup qualification	Palestine	2–1	Pakistan	Arad, Bahrain
18:30 UTC+3	Al-Nabris 90+10' (pen.), 90+15'	Report	Hamid 51'	Stadium: Al Muharraq Stadium

22 September 2023 2022 Asian Games	Qatar	0–0	Palestine	Hangzhou, China
19:30 UTC+8		Report		Stadium: Xiaoshan Sports Centre Stadium; Attendance: 6,475; Referee: Ammar Ashkanani (Kuwait)

25 September 2023 2022 Asian Games	Palestine	0–1	Japan	Hangzhou, China
19:30 UTC+8			Yachida 23'	Stadium: Xiaoshan Sports Centre Stadium

27 September 2023 2022 Asian Games	Hong Kong	1–0	Palestine	Hangzhou, China
19:30 UTC+8	Orr 48'	Report		Stadium: Xiaoshan Sports Centre Stadium; Attendance: 7,219; Referee: Kim Hee-gon (South Korea)

=== 2025 ===
22 August 2025 Friendly	Lebanon	0–3	Palestine	Beirut, Lebanon
		Report

25 August 2025 Friendly	Lebanon	v	Palestine	Beirut, Lebanon

3 September 2025 2026 AFC U-23 Asian Cup qualification	Palestine	–	Kyrgyzstan	Bishkek, Kyrgyzstan

6 September 2025 2026 AFC U-23 Asian Cup qualification	Sri Lanka	–	Palestine	Bishkek, Kyrgyzstan

9 September 2025 2026 AFC U-23 Asian Cup qualification	Uzbekistan	–	Palestine	Bishkek, Kyrgyzstan

== Record per opponent ==
Opponent	Pld	W	D	L	GF	GA	GD	W%	Confederation
Algeria	3	0	0	3	1	6	-5	0	CAF
Bahrain	5	2	0	3	3	9	-6	0	AFC
Bangladesh	2	2	0	0	4	0	+4	0	AFC
Chinese Taipei	1	0	1	0	0	0	0	0	AFC
Hong Kong	1	0	1	0	1	1	0	0	AFC
Indonesia	2	2	0	0	4	2	+2	0	AFC
Iran	3	0	2	1	3	6	-3	0	AFC
Iraq	1	0	0	1	0	1	-1	0	AFC
Japan	4	0	0	4	0	8	-8	0	AFC
Jordan	14	7	4	3	18	13	+5	0	AFC
Kuwait	8	1	2	5	4	16	-12	0	AFC
Kyrgyzstan	2	0	1	1	0	3	-3	0	AFC
Laos	1	1	0	0	2	1	+1	0	AFC
Lebanon	1	1	0	0	4	2	+2	0	AFC
Mauritania	1	0	1	0	1	1	0	0	CAF
Morocco	1	0	0	1	1	3	-2	0	CAF
Nepal	2	2	0	0	3	1	+2	0	AFC
North Korea	2	0	1	1	1	4	-3	0	AFC
Pakistan	3	3	0	0	6	1	+5	0	AFC
Qatar	6	3	1	2	10	8	+2	0	AFC
Saudi Arabia	3	0	0	3	1	7	-6	0	AFC
Sri Lanka	3	2	1	0	13	1	+12	0	AFC
Syria	5	1	1	3	3	5	-2	0	AFC
Tajikistan	2	1	1	0	4	3	+1	0	AFC
Thailand	2	1	0	1	5	2	+3	0	AFC
Tunisia	5	0	1	4	3	8	-5	0	CAF
Turkmenistan	1	0	0	1	1	3	-2	0	AFC
United Arab Emirates	1	1	0	0	1	0	+1	0	AFC
Uzbekistan	2	1	0	1	2	3	-1	0	AFC
Yemen	3	0	1	2	3	6	-3	0	AFC
Total	0	0	0	0	0	0	0	0	—

== Results ==
Key
Win
Draw
Defeat
