= Rafi Syarahil =

Indonesian association football player

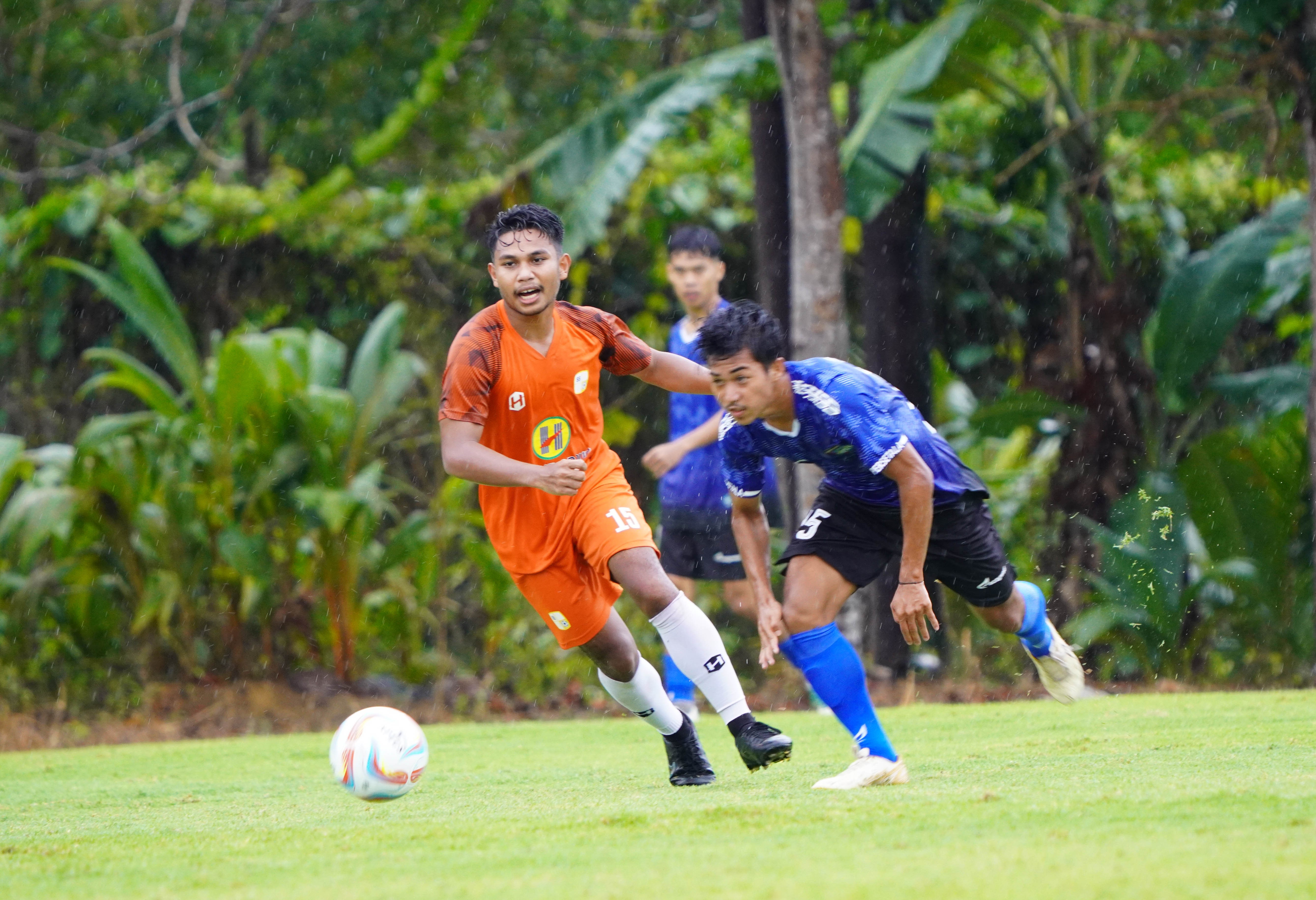

Personal information
- Full name: Muhamad Rafi Syarahil
- Date of birth: 15 November 2000 (age 25)
- Place of birth: Jakarta, Indonesia
- Height: 1.67 m (5 ft 6 in)
- Position: Defensive midfielder

Youth career
- 2010–2011: SSB Garuda Muda
- 2011–2013: ASIOP Apacinti
- 2013–2015: SSB Annisa Pratama
- 2015–2017: Bina Taruna
- 2017–2018: Barito Putera

Senior career*
Years	Team	Apps	(Gls)
2018–2024	Barito Putera	50	(0)
2023–2024	→ Nusantara United (loan)	14	(0)
2024	Persikas Subang	12	(0)

International career
2018	Indonesia U19	6	(0)
2019	Indonesia U23	6	(1)
Medal record
Men's football
Representing Indonesia
AFF U-19 Youth Championship
Third place	2018 Indonesia	Team
AFF U-22 Youth Championship
Winner	2019 Cambodia	Team
- * Club domestic league appearances and goals as of 15 December 2024

Muhamad Rafi Syarahil (born 15 November 2000) is an Indonesian professional footballer who plays as a defensive midfielder.

== International career ==
Rafi is one of the players that strengthen Indonesia U19 in 2018 AFC U-19 Championship.

== Career statistics ==
=== Club ===
As of match played 15 December 2024

Club	Season	League		Cup		Other (Note: Appearances in Indonesia President's Cup)		Total	
Club	Season	Apps	Goals	Apps	Goals	Apps	Goals	Apps	Goals
Barito Putera	2018	16	0	0	0	3	0	19	0
Barito Putera	2019	1	0	0	0	0	0	1	0
Barito Putera	2020	1	0	0	0	0	0	1	0
Barito Putera	2021–22	14	0	0	0	0	0	14	0
Barito Putera	2022–23	18	0	0	0	2	0	20	0
Barito Putera	2023–24	0	0	0	0	0	0	0	0
Nusantara United (loan)	2023–24	14	0	0	0	0	0	14	0
Persikas Subang	2024–25	12	0	0	0	0	0	12	0
Career total		76	0	0	0	5	0	81	0

=== International goals ===
International under-23 goals

Goal	Date	Venue	Opponent	Score	Result	Competition
1	26 March 2019	Mỹ Đình National Stadium, Hanoi, Vietnam	Brunei	2–0	2–1	2020 AFC U-23 Championship qualification

== Honours ==
=== International ===
Indonesia U-19

- AFF U-19 Youth Championship third place: 2018

Indonesia U-22

- AFF U-22 Youth Championship: 2019
