= Huỳnh Tấn Sinh =

Vietnamese footballer (born 1998)

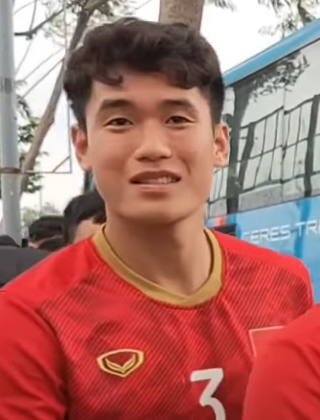
- Tấn Sinh in 2019

Personal information
- Full name: Huỳnh Tấn Sinh
- Date of birth: 6 April 1998 (age 28)
- Place of birth: Duy Xuyên, Quảng Nam, Vietnam
- Height: 1.85 m (6 ft 1 in)
- Position: Centre-back

Team information
- Current team: Đồng Nai City
- Number: 3

Youth career
- 2014–2016: Quảng Nam

Senior career*
Years	Team	Apps	(Gls)
2017–2022	Quảng Nam	60	(2)
2022	→ Hà Nội (loan)	3	(0)
2023–2024	Công An Hà Nội	25	(0)
2024–	Đồng Nai City	39	(1)

International career^{‡}
2016–2017	Vietnam U20	3	(0)
2016–2018	Vietnam U21	2	(1)
2018–2020	Vietnam U23	3	(1)
- * Club domestic league appearances and goals as of 6 June 2026 ‡ National team caps and goals as of 8 September 2019

Huỳnh Tấn Sinh (born 6 April 1998) is a Vietnamese professional footballer who plays as a centre-back for V.League 1 club Đồng Nai City.

== International goals ==
=== Vietnam U23 ===
No.	Date	Venue	Opponent	Score	Result	Competition
1.	22 March 2019	Mỹ Đình National Stadium, Hanoi, Vietnam	Brunei	5–0	6–0	2020 AFC U-23 Championship qualification

== Achievements ==
QNK Quảng Nam

- V.League 1: 2017

Hà Nội

- V.League 1: 2022
- Vietnamese National Cup: 2022

Công An Hà Nội

- V.League 1: 2023

Trường Tươi Đồng Nai

- V.League 2: 2025–26

Vietnam U23

- SEA Games gold medal: 2019

Individual

- V.League 2 Team of the Season: 2024–25, 2025–26
