= Fawaz Ayedh =

Kuwaiti footballer

Personal information
- Full name: Fawaz Ayedh Abdullah Rajeh Wael Al-Otaibi
- Date of birth: 21 February 1997 (age 29)
- Place of birth: Kuwait City, Kuwait
- Height: 1.75 m (5 ft 9 in)
- Position: Midfielder

Team information
- Current team: Al-Salmiya
- Number: 10

Senior career*
Years	Team	Apps	(Gls)
2017–	Al-Salmiya		

International career^{‡}
2018–	Kuwait	35	(1)
- * Club domestic league appearances and goals as of 15:43, 5 June 2026 (UTC) ‡ National team caps and goals as of 15:43, 5 June 2026 (UTC)

Fawaz Ayedh Abdullah Rajeh Wael Al-Otaibi (فواز عايض العتيبي; born 21 February 1997) is a Kuwaiti footballer who plays as a midfielder for Al-Salmiya SC in the Kuwait Premier League.

== Club career ==
Fawaz has spent his entire senior club career with Al-Salmiya SC, having first appeared for the club in the 2017–18 season. He has remained a consistent presence in the Al-Salmiya squad and was recognised as one of the league's standout players by Zain, the title sponsor of the Kuwait Premier League.

== International career ==
Fawaz made his debut for the Kuwait national football team in 2018. He has represented Kuwait in several competitions including the 2023 SAFF Championship, the 25th Arabian Gulf Cup, the 26th Arabian Gulf Cup, and the 2025 Arab Cup.

In May 2025, he was called up to the national squad for the 2026 World Cup qualifying campaign as a replacement for an injured player, and participated in the training camp ahead of fixtures against Palestine and South Korea.
