= Amran Al-Hidi =

Omani footballer (born 1998)

Personal information
- Full name: Amran Said Juma Kharbash Al-Hidi
- Date of birth: 7 April 1998 (age 28)
- Place of birth: Saham, Oman
- Height: 1.85 m (6 ft 1 in)
- Positions: Midfielder; defender

Team information
- Current team: Al-Nahda Club (Oman)

Senior career*
Years	Team	Apps	(Gls)
2019-2020	Suwaiq Club		
2020-2021	Fanja SC		
2021-2022	Suwaiq Club		
2022-2023	Al-Nahda Club (Oman)		
2023-	Al-Nasr SC (Salalah)	24	(0)

International career^{‡}
2019–	Oman	8	(1)
- * Club domestic league appearances and goals as of 3/1/25 @ 14:38(AEST) ‡ National team caps and goals as of 2 April 2020

Amran Said Juma Kharbash Al-Hidi (born 7 April 1998) is an Omani footballer who plays for Suwaiq Club and the Omani national team.

== International career ==
Al-Hidi made his senior international debut on 5 September 2019, during the 2022 FIFA World Cup qualification match in a 1–2 victory against India.

On 14 November 2019, Al-Hidi scored his first goal in a major competition for Oman against Bangladesh in a 4–1 victory.

== International goals ==
No.	Date	Venue	Opponent	Score	Result	Competition
1.	14 November 2019	Sultan Qaboos Sports Complex, Muscat, Oman	Bangladesh	4–1	4–1	2022 FIFA World Cup qualification
