= Hassan Mehanna =

Lebanese footballer (born 1997)

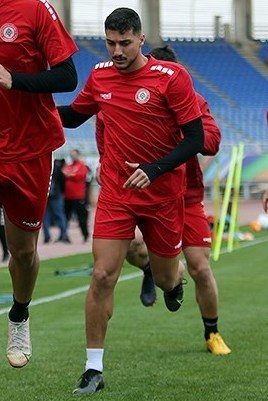
- Mehanna with Lebanon in 2022

Personal information
- Full name: Hassan Ali Atwi Mehanna
- Date of birth: 29 January 1997 (age 29)
- Place of birth: Beirut, Lebanon
- Height: 1.80 m (5 ft 11 in)
- Position: Striker

Team information
- Current team: Safa
- Number: 9

Youth career
- –2015: ASA

Senior career*
Years	Team	Apps	(Gls)
2015–2017	Nejmeh	5	(0)
2017–2018	Shabab Arabi	15	(0)
2018–2020	Safa	21	(3)
2020	Sevan	6	(3)
2020–2021	Safa	5	(2)
2021–2022	Bourj	8	(3)
2022	Naft Maysan	9	(1)
2022–2024	Nejmeh	21	(3)
2024–2025	Bourj	21	(7)
2025–	Safa	20	(3)

International career^{‡}
2015	Lebanon U19	2	(0)
2017	Lebanon U20		(1)
2019	Lebanon U23	3	(1)
2022	Lebanon	1	(0)
- * Club domestic league appearances and goals as of 3 July 2026 ‡ National team caps and goals as of 15:22, 24 March 2022 (UTC)

Hassan Ali Atwi Mehanna (Arabic: حسن علي عطوي مهنا; born 29 January 1997) is a Lebanese footballer who plays as a striker for Lebanese Premier League club Safa.

== Club career ==
Mehanna played at youth level for Advanced Soccer Academy (ASA). He began his professional career in the Lebanese Premier League for Nejmeh in 2015, before playing for Shabab Arabi and Safa.

In February 2020, during the winter transfer season, Mehanna joined Armenian First League side Sevan. He scored one goal in three appearances, before the 2019–20 season was cancelled due to the COVID-19 pandemic. On 15 August 2020, Mehanna renewed his contract with Sevan for an additional season. On 28 October 2020, Mehanna and Sevan mutually terminated his contract; he had scored two goals and made one assist in three league games. Mehanna scored five goals and assisted six goals in all competitions.

On 22 December 2020, Mehanna returned to Safa in Lebanon.

On 30 July 2021, Mehanna joined Bourj.

In January 2022, Mehanna moved to Naft Maysan in the Iraqi Premier League.

On 16 May 2022, Mehanna returned to Nejmeh on a three-year contract.

After breaking his contract with Nejmeh on a mutual agreement in September 2024, Mehanna returned to Bourj ahead of the 2024–25 Lebanese Premier League season.

On 30 July 2025, Mehanna returned once more to Safa.

== International career ==
Mehanna represented Lebanon internationally at under-20 level at the 2017 Jeux de la Francophonie, scoring a goal against Guinea. He made his senior debut on 24 March 2022, in the 2022 FIFA World Cup qualification, coming on as a substitute in a 3–0 defeat to Syria.

== Career statistics ==
=== International ===
As of match played 24 March 2022

Appearances and goals by national team and year
National team	Year	Apps	Goals
Lebanon	2022	1	0
Total		1	0

== Honours ==
Nejmeh

- Lebanese Premier League: 2023–24
- Lebanese FA Cup: 2022–23
- Lebanese Super Cup: 2023
