= Trần Thanh Sơn =

Vietnamese footballer

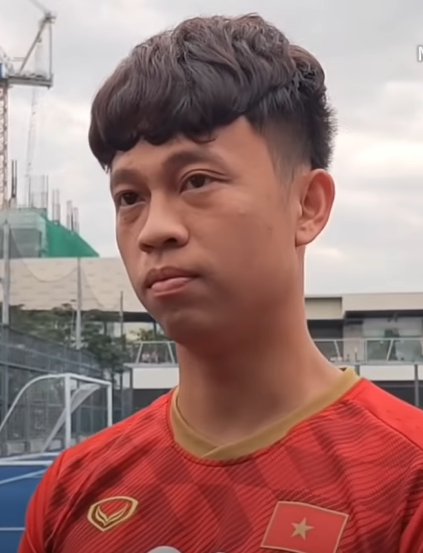
- Trần Thanh Sơn in 2019

Personal information
- Full name: Trần Thanh Sơn
- Date of birth: 30 December 1997 (age 28)
- Place of birth: Ho Chi Minh City, Vietnam
- Height: 1.74 m (5 ft 9 in)
- Position: Central midfielder

Team information
- Current team: Hoàng Anh Gia Lai
- Number: 6

Youth career
- 2009–2016: Hoàng Anh Gia Lai

Senior career*
Years	Team	Apps	(Gls)
2017–	Hoàng Anh Gia Lai	74	(1)
2018	→ Đắk Lắk (loan)		
2020–2022	→ Công An Nhân Dân (loan)	35	(1)

International career
2015–2017	Vietnam U20	5	(0)
2019–2020	Vietnam U23	12	(1)
- * Club domestic league appearances and goals as of 7 June 2026

Trần Thanh Sơn (born 30 December 1997) is a Vietnamese professional footballer who plays as a central midfielder for V.League 1 club Hoàng Anh Gia Lai.

== International goals ==
=== Vietnam U23 ===
No.	Date	Venue	Opponent	Score	Result	Competition
1.	26 March 2019	Mỹ Đình National Stadium, Hanoi, Vietnam	Thailand	4–0	4–0	2020 AFC U-23 Championship qualification

== Honours ==
Công An Nhân Dân

- V.League 2: 2022

Vietnam U23

- SEA Games gold medal: 2019
