= Mohammed Al-Hammadi (footballer, born 1997) =

Emirati footballer

Personal information
- Full name: Mohammed Rashid Rashed Ahmed Mohammed Al-Hammadi
- Date of birth: 11 May 1997 (age 29)
- Place of birth: United Arab Emirates
- Height: 1.75 m (5 ft 9 in)
- Position: Forward

Team information
- Current team: Dibba Al-Hisn
- Number: 21

Youth career
- Al-Wahda

Senior career*
| Years | Team | Apps | (Gls) |
| 2016–2020 | Al-Wahda | 18 | (2) |
| 2019–2020 | → Baniyas (loan) | 8 | (1) |
| 2020–2023 | Baniyas | 44 | (3) |
| 2023–2026 | Al Bataeh | 30 | (6) |
| 2026– | Dibba Al-Hisn | 0 | (0) |
- * Club domestic league appearances and goals

Mohammed Al-Hammadi (Arabic: محمد الحمادي) (born 11 May 1997) is an Emirati footballer. He currently plays as a forward for Dibba Al-Hisn.
