= Mousa Farawi =

Palestinian footballer

Personal information
- Full name: Mousa Basheer Mousa Farawi
- Date of birth: 22 March 1998 (age 28)
- Place of birth: Jerusalem, Palestine
- Height: 1.77 m (5 ft 10 in)
- Position: Right-back

Senior career*
Years	Team	Apps	(Gls)
2017–2021	Hilal Al-Quds		
2021–2023	Shabab Al-Khalil		
2023–2024	Hilal Al-Quds		
2024–2025	National Bank of Egypt	6	(0)
2025	→ Ghazl El Mahalla (loan)	4	(0)
2026	Al-Arabi	6	(0)

International career^{‡}
2018–2021	Palestine U23	11	(1)
2019–	Palestine	18	(0)
- * Club domestic league appearances and goals as of 27 April 2026 ‡ National team caps and goals as of 10 June 2025

Mousa Basheer Mousa Farawi (Arabic: موسى بشير موسى فيراوي; born 22 March 1998) is a Palestinian footballer who last played as a defender for Qatar Stars League club Al-Arabi. He represents the Palestine national team.

On 28 January 2024, Farawi made his first move abroad, signing with National Bank of Egypt on a contract through June 2026. On 20 January 2025, he was loaned to Ghazl El Mahalla. He signed for Al-Arabi in 2026.
