= Abdullah Al-Ahrak =

Qatari footballer (born 1997)

Personal information
- Full name: Abdullah Abdulsalam Al-Ahrak
- Date of birth: 10 May 1997 (age 29)
- Place of birth: Doha, Qatar
- Height: 1.75 m (5 ft 9 in)
- Position: Midfielder

Team information
- Current team: Qatar (on loan from Al-Duhail)
- Number: 14

Youth career
- –2016: Aspire Academy
- 2013–2014: → Real Madrid (loan)

Senior career*
Years	Team	Apps	(Gls)
2016–2017	Cultural Leonesa	1	(0)
2017–	Al-Duhail	82	(6)
2019–2020	→ Al-Ahli (loan)	10	(1)
2023–2024	→ Qatar (loan)	18	(1)
2026–	→ Qatar (loan)	0	(0)

International career^{‡}
2014–2016	Qatar U20	16	(0)
2016–2018	Qatar U23	8	(1)
2017–	Qatar	26	(1)
- * Club domestic league appearances and goals as of 17 January 2026 ‡ National team caps and goals as of 5 January 2022 (UTC)

Abdullah Al-Ahrak (born 10 May 1997) is a Qatari footballer who plays as midfielder for Qatar, on loan from Al-Duhail and Qatar national football team.

== International career ==
Al-Ahrak made his international debut for Qatar on September 5, 2017 during a 2018 FIFA World Cup qualification match against China.

=== International goals ===
Scores and results Qatar's goal tally first.

No.	Date	Venue	Opponent	Score	Result	Competition
1.	29 November 2019	Khalifa International Stadium, Doha, Qatar	Yemen	5–0	6–0	24th Arabian Gulf Cup

== Honours ==
=== Club ===
Al Duhail SC

- Qatar Stars League: 2017–18, 2019–20
- Qatar Emir Cup: 2018, 2019
- Qatar Cup: 2018 Qatar Cup

=== International ===
Qatar

- 2014 AFC U-19 Championship
