= Abdulaziz Khalid =

Bahraini footballer

Personal information
- Full name: Abdulaziz Khalid Ahmed Khalifa Rajab
- Date of birth: 17 March 1997 (age 29)
- Position: Forward

Team information
- Current team: Al-Riffa SC
- Number: 21

Senior career*
Years	Team	Apps	(Gls)
2017–2021	Al-Najma		
2021-	Al-Riffa SC	5	(0)

International career^{‡}
2018–	Bahrain	1	(0)
- * Club domestic league appearances and goals as of 14:39 (AEST) @ 1/3/25 ‡ National team caps and goals as of 18:04, 18 July 2018 (UTC)

Abdulaziz Khalid Ahmed Khalifa Rajab (born 17 March 1997), commonly referred to as Abdulaziz Khalid, is a Bahraini international footballer who plays as a forward for Al-Najma.

== Career statistics ==
=== International ===
As of matches played 3 January 2020.

National team	Year	Apps	Goals
Bahrain	2018	1	0
Bahrain	2019	0	0
Total		1	0
