= Ahmed Bughammar =

Bahraini footballer

Personal information
- Full name: Ahmed Mubarak Ahmed Mubarak Bughammar
- Date of birth: 30 December 1997 (age 28)
- Place of birth: Muharraq, Bahrain
- Height: 1.82 m (6 ft 0 in)
- Position: Defender

Team information
- Current team: Al-Khaldiya
- Number: 4

Senior career*
Years	Team	Apps	(Gls)
2014–2021	Al-Hidd		
2021–	Al-Khaldiya		
2026-	Al-Muharraq SC		

International career^{‡}
2015–2016	Bahrain U19	5	(1)
2017	Bahrain U20	3	(0)
2017–	Bahrain U23	6	(0)
2018–	Bahrain	31	(2)
- * Club domestic league appearances and goals as of 4 October 2022 ‡ National team caps and goals as of 17 November 2026

Ahmed Mubarak Bughammar (Arabic: أَحمَد مُبَارَك أَحمَد مُبَارَك بُوغَمَّار; born 30 December 1997) is a Bahraini footballer who plays as a defender for Al-Khaldiya and the Bahrain national team.

== Career ==
Bughammar was named in Bahrain's squad for the 2019 AFC Asian Cup in the United Arab Emirates.

== Career statistics ==
=== International ===
As of 17 November 2026

Bahrain
Year	Apps	Goals
2018	1	0
2019	11	0
2020	1	0
2021	8	1
2022	2	0
2023	2	0
2024	0	0
2025	4	0
2026	1	1
Total	30	2

=== International goals ===
Scores and results list Bahrain's goal tally first.

No.	Date	Venue	Opponent	Score	Result	Competition
1.	1 September 2021	Bahrain National Stadium, Riffa, Bahrain	Haiti	5–0	6–1	Friendly
2.	17 November 2026	Zhaoqing New District Sports Center Stadium, Zhaoqing, China	China	2–0	2–2	Friendly
