= Majid Rashid =

Emirati footballer (born 2000)

Personal information
- Full name: Majid Rashid Sultan Al-Khabeel Al-Mehrzi
- Date of birth: 16 May 2000 (age 26)
- Place of birth: Kalba, United Arab Emirates
- Height: 1.81 m (5 ft 11 in)
- Position: Defensive midfielder

Team information
- Current team: Al-Sharjah
- Number: 24

Youth career
- Ittihad Kalba

Senior career*
Years	Team	Apps	(Gls)
2016–2021	Ittihad Kalba	83	(3)
2021–	Sharjah	42	(1)

International career
2018–2023	United Arab Emirates U23	3	(0)
2021–	United Arab Emirates	24	(0)
- * Club domestic league appearances and goals

Majid Rashid Sultan Al-Khabeel Al-Mehrzi (Arabic: مَاجِد رَاشِد سُلْطَان الْخَبِيل الْمَحْرَزِيّ; born 16 May 2000) is an Emirati footballer. He currently plays as a defensive midfielder for Al-Sharjah.

== International career ==
On 4 January 2024, Rashid was named in the UAE's squad for the 2023 AFC Asian Cup.

== Honours ==
Sharjah

- UAE President's Cup: 2021–22, 2022–23
- UAE League Cup: 2022–23
- UAE Super Cup: 2022
- AFC Champions League Two: 2024–25
