= Reza Jabireh =

Iranian footballer

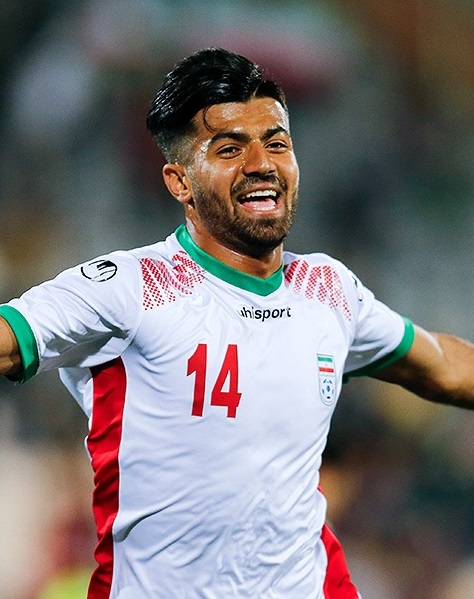

Personal information
- Date of birth: 7 July 1997 (age 29)
- Place of birth: Kohgiluyeh, Iran
- Height: 1.80 m (5 ft 11 in)
- Position: Forward

Team information
- Current team: Aluminium Arak
- Number: 10

Youth career
- –2016: Sanat Naft

Senior career*
Years	Team	Apps	(Gls)
2016–2020	Sanat Naft	59	(8)
2020–2021	Paykan	25	(2)
2021–2022	Sanat Naft	14	(2)
2022–2025	Aluminium Arak	62	(5)
2025	→ Mes Rafsanjan (loan)	14	(4)
2025–2026	Chadormalou	13	(0)
2026	Mes Rafsanjan	5	(1)
2026–	Aluminium Arak	7	(0)

International career^{‡}
2017–2018	Iran U20	3	(0)
2018–2020	Iran U23	12	(2)
- * Club domestic league appearances and goals as of 1 May 2025 ‡ National team caps and goals as of 15 January 2020

Reza Jabireh (Persian: رضا جبيره; born 7 July 1997) is an Iranian football forward who plays for Aluminium Arak in the Persian Gulf Pro League on loan from Aluminium Arak.
