= Dawoud Iraqi =

Palestinian footballer

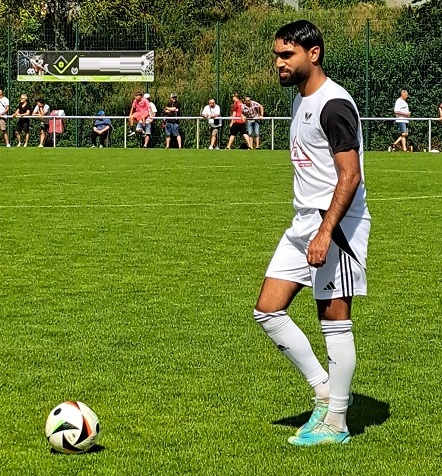

Personal information
- Full name: Daoud Younis Abdallah Iraqi
- Date of birth: 13 September 1999 (age 27)
- Position: Forward

Team information
- Current team: SV Tasmania Berlin
- Number: 13

Youth career
- –2015: Hertha Zehlendorf
- 2015–2017: Tennis Borussia Berlin
- 2017–2018: Berliner AK 07

Senior career*
Years	Team	Apps	(Gls)
2018–2019	Berliner AK 07	16	(0)
2019	Tennis Borussia Berlin	12	(2)
2020	Berliner AK 07	3	(1)
2020–2021	Tennis Borussia Berlin	9	(3)
2021	Phönix Lübeck	7	(0)
2022–2024	SV Babelsberg 03	38	(0)
2024–2025	BFC Preussen	26	(2)
2025–	SV Tasmania Berlin	3	(0)

International career
2020	Palestine	3	(0)
- * Club domestic league appearances and goals as of 20:58, 26 October 2025 (UTC)

Daoud Younis Abdallah Iraqi (born 13 September 1999) is a Palestinian professional footballer who plays as a forward for SV Tasmania Berlin.

== Career statistics ==
=== Club ===
As of 29 February 2020.

Club	Season	League			Cup		Continental		Other		Total	
Club	Season	Division	Apps	Goals	Apps	Goals	Apps	Goals	Apps	Goals	Apps	Goals
Berliner AK 07	2017–18	Regionalliga Nordost	1	0	0	0	–		0	0	1	0
Berliner AK 07	2018–19	Regionalliga Nordost	15	0	0	0	–		1 (Note: Appearances in the Berlin Cup)	0	16	0
Berliner AK 07	Total		16	0	0	0	0	0	0	0	16	0
Tennis Borussia Berlin	2019–20	NOFV-Oberliga Nord	12	2	0	0	–		3	0	15	2
Berliner AK 07	2019–20	Regionalliga Nordost	3	1	0	0	–		0	0	3	1
Career total			31	3	0	0	0	0	4	0	35	3

=== International ===
As of matches played 29 February 2020.

National team	Year	Apps	Goals
Palestine	2020	3	0
Total		3	0
