= Mohamed Al-Hardan =

Bahraini footballer (born 1997)

Mohammed Al-Hardan
Personal information
- Full name: Mohamed Yusuf Abdulla Ahmed Hassan Al-Hardan
- Date of birth: 6 October 1997 (age 29)
- Place of birth: Muharraq, Bahrain
- Height: 1.82 m (6 ft 0 in)
- Position: Midfielder

Team information
- Current team: Al-Muharraq

Youth career
- Al-Muharraq

Senior career*
Years	Team	Apps	(Gls)
2016–2018	Al-Muharraq		(2)
2018–2019	Vejle BK	2	(0)
2018	→ Sfântul Gheorghe (loan)	4	(0)
2019	→ Aiginiakos (loan)	5	(0)
2019–	Al-Muharraq	0	(0)

International career
2016	Bahrain U-19	3	(3)
2017	Bahrain U-20	3	(2)
2018–	Bahrain U-23	3	(2)
2018–2024	Bahrain	29	(2)
- * Club domestic league appearances and goals as of 19 October 2019

Mohamed Yusuf Abdulla Ahmed Hassan Al-Hardan (Arabic: مُحَمَّد يُوسُف عَبد اللَّه أَحمَد حَسَن الْحَرْدَان; born 6 October 1997) is a Bahraini professional footballer who plays as a midfielder. He is currently playing for Al-Muharraq.

== Club career ==
=== Al Muharraq ===
He started his career in his homeland with Al-Muharraq after his useful journey in Europe he came back to Al Muharraq and played fully season and muharraq reached the final cup and the top in the league until the league has suspended for COVID-19, in that season he played very well, he scored q goal in the King Cup and two goals in the league, 2 assists in the King Cup as well and 5 assists in the league.

=== Vejle BK ===
In August 2017, Mohammed joined Vejle after a successful trial with the team to be the first Bahraini player to play in a European first tier team alongside Abdulla Yusuf Helal who joined Czech side Bohemians 1905. His contract with Vejle was extended to the summer of 2020, on 15 March 2018. On 28 August 2019, it was announced that Al-Hardan was released from his contract with Vejle.

==== Sfântul Gheorghe (loan) ====
On 27 August 2018, Vejle Boldklub announced that Al-Hardan will be joining Sfântul Gheorghe on loan after returning from his national team duties.

==== Aiginiakos (loan) ====
Al-Hardan returned to Vejle at the end of 2018. But on 29 January 2019, he was loaned out again, this time to Aiginiakos in Greece.

== International career ==
As of August 2018, he is the captain of the Bahrain national under-20 football team, and has also played for the under-23 side, and he played with the First team midfielder as option 1 for the coach, he played WAFF Championship and won the cup as the first cup for his country in football, and after few months he played Arabian Gulf Cup the 24th in Qatar and Bahrain has won as the first time in history (in which he scored a penalty in the semi-final).

=== International goals ===
Scores and results list Bahrain's goal tally first.

No.	Date	Venue	Opponent	Score	Result	Competition
1.	15 October 2019	Bahrain National Stadium, Riffa, Bahrain	Iran	1–0	1–0	2022 FIFA World Cup qualification
2.	23 March 2022	Bahrain National Stadium, Riffa, Bahrain	India	1–0	2–1	Friendly

== Honours ==
Vejle Boldklub

- Danish 1st Division
- Arabian Gulf Cup
- WAFF Championship
