= Football at the 2018 Asian Games =

Association football tournament in Indonesia

- Venues: Six stadiums across Indonesia
- Dates: 10 August – 1 September
- Teams: 25 (Men's); 11 (Women's)

Medalists
gold medal	South Korea (men); Japan (women)
silver medal	Japan (men); China (women)
bronze medal	United Arab Emirates (men); South Korea (women)

Football at the 2018 Asian Games was held from 14 August to 1 September 2018 in Indonesia. One of the host cities, Palembang, hosted the women's event, while the men's matches are played in Bekasi, Cibinong, Cikarang, and Soreang.

The Games' main stadium, the Gelora Bung Karno Stadium, Jakarta did not host the football events. The stadium hosted the ceremonies and the athletics.

All the top 20 nations sent their national football teams to the Asian Games excluding India. A total of 25 men's team and 11 women's team competed at the Asian Games. The Indian Olympic Association (IOA) refused to clear the Indian football team to participate in the tournament due its policy of only sending national teams that were ranked among the top eight at the continental level (India were ranked 14th at the time in Asia). The decision was opposed by the All India Football Federation (AIFF) who described the IOA as lacking "vision and competence", and that the IOA did not consider the recent form and upwards movement of the India national football team in FIFA World Rankings. This was the first time that the Indian football team did not participate in the tournament since the 1994 Asian Games. Several nations also refused to participate most notably including Tajikistan, Maldives, Yemen and Lebanon; the latter two teams will participate in 2019 AFC Asian Cup.

== Competition schedule ==
All times are local Indonesia Western Standard Time (UTC+7).

G	Group stage	1/8	Round of 16	1/4	Quarter-finals	1/2	Semi-finals	B	Bronze medal match	F	Gold medal match

Date Event	Fri 10	Sat 11	Sun 12	Mon 13	Tue 14	Wed 15	Thu 16	Fri 17	Sat 18	Sun 19	Mon 20	Tue 21	Wed 22	Thu 23	Fri 24	Sat 25	Sun 26	Mon 27	Tue 28	Wed 29	Thu 30	Fri 31		Sat 01	
Men	G		G		G					G				1/8				1/4		1/2				B	F
Women							G			G					1/4				1/2			B	F		

== Venues ==
=== Men's venues ===
Soreang	Cibinong	Bekasi	Cikarang
Jalak Harupat	Pakansari	Patriot Chandrabhaga	Wibawa Mukti
Capacity: 27,000	Capacity: 30,000	Capacity: 30,000	Capacity: 28,778
Football at the 2018 Asian Games is located in West Java

=== Women's venues ===
(Indonesia) Palembang
Gelora Sriwijaya	Bumi Sriwijaya
Capacity: 23,000	Capacity: 7,000
Football at the 2018 Asian Games is located in Palembang

== Participating nations and regions ==
=== Men's tournament ===
- Bahrain
- Bangladesh
- China
- Chinese Taipei
- Hong Kong
- Indonesia
- Iran
- Japan
- Kyrgyzstan
- Laos
- Malaysia
- Myanmar
- Nepal
- North Korea
- Pakistan
- Palestine
- Qatar
- Saudi Arabia
- South Korea
- Syria
- Timor-Leste
- Thailand
- United Arab Emirates
- Uzbekistan
- Vietnam

=== Women's tournament ===
- China
- Chinese Taipei
- Hong Kong
- Indonesia (host)
- Japan
- Maldives
- North Korea
- South Korea
- Tajikistan
- Thailand
- Vietnam

== Medal summary ==
=== Medal table ===
Rank	Nation	Gold	Silver	Bronze	Total
1	Japan	1	1	0	2
2	South Korea	1	0	1	2
3	China	0	1	0	1
4	United Arab Emirates	0	0	1	1
Totals (4 entries)		2	2	2	6

=== Medalists ===
Event	Gold	Silver	Bronze
Men	South Korea; Song Bum-keun; Hwang Hyun-soo; Kim Min-jae; Kim Jin-ya; Jeong Tae-wook; Kim Moon-hwan; Son Heung-min; Lee Jin-hyun; Hwang Hee-chan; Hwang In-beom; Na Sang-ho; Lee Si-young; Cho Yu-min; Jang Yun-ho; Lee Seung-mo; Hwang Ui-jo; Lee Seung-woo; Jo Hyeon-woo; Kim Geon-ung; Kim Jung-min	Japan; Ryosuke Kojima; Yoichi Naganuma; Makoto Okazaki; Ko Itakura; Daiki Sugioka; Ryo Hatsuse; Teruki Hara; Kaoru Mitoma; Reo Hatate; Koji Miyoshi; Keita Endo; Powell Obinna Obi; Yuto Iwasaki; Taishi Matsumoto; Ayase Ueda; Kota Watanabe; Yuta Kamiya; Daizen Maeda; Takuma Ominami; Yugo Tatsuta	United Arab Emirates; Sultan Al-Mantheri; Abdullah Hassan Al-Noubi; Ahmed Rashed; Salem Sultan; Ismael Khaled; Majed Suroor; Ahmed Al-Attas; Jassem Yaqoub; Khaled Ibrahim; Ali Eid; Abdulrahman Al-Ameri; Abdullah Ghanem; Mohammed Al-Attas; Hussain Abdullah; Mohamed Al-Shamsi; Hamad Jassim; Mohammed Khalfan; Shahin Suroor; Zayed Al-Ameri; Rashed Mohammed
Women	Japan; Sakiko Ikeda; Risa Shimizu; Aya Sameshima; Shiori Miyake; Hikari Takagi; Saori Ariyoshi; Emi Nakajima; Mana Iwabuchi; Yuika Sugasawa; Yuka Momiki; Mina Tanaka; Rika Masuya; Yu Nakasato; Yui Hasegawa; Moeno Sakaguchi; Rin Sumida; Aimi Kunitake; Ayaka Yamashita	China; Zhao Lina; Han Peng; Huang Yini; Lou Jiahui; Wu Haiyan; Lin Yuping; Wang Shuang; Li Jiayue; Ren Guixin; Li Ying; Wang Shanshan; Wang Yan; Li Tingting; Zhao Rong; Xiao Yuyi; Yang Lina; Gu Yasha; Li Mengwen; Bi Xiaolin; Zhang Rui	South Korea; Yoon Young-geul; Jang Sel-gi; Shin Dam-yeong; Shim Seo-yeon; Hong Hye-ji; Lim Seon-joo; Lee Min-a; Cho So-hyun; Jeon Ga-eul; Ji So-yun; Lee Geum-min; Moon Mi-ra; Han Chae-rin; Choe Yu-ri; Jang Chang; Son Hwa-yeon; Lee Hyun-young; Jung Bo-ram; Lee Eun-mi; Kim Hye-ri

== Men's competition ==
The competition consisted of two stages; a group stage followed by a knockout stage.

=== Group stage ===
==== Group A ====
Pos	Team	Pld	W	D	L	GF	GA	GD	Pts	Qualification
1	Indonesia (H)	4	3	0	1	11	3	+8	9	Advance to knockout stage
2	Palestine	4	2	2	0	5	3	+2	8	Advance to knockout stage
3	Hong Kong	4	2	1	1	9	5	+4	7	Advance to knockout stage
4	Laos	4	1	0	3	4	8	−4	3	
5	Chinese Taipei	4	0	1	3	0	10	−10	1	

Source: Asian Games 2018
Rules for classification: Group stage tiebreakers
(H) Hosts

==== Group B ====
Pos	Team	Pld	W	D	L	GF	GA	GD	Pts	Qualification
1	Uzbekistan	3	3	0	0	10	0	+10	9	Advance to knockout stage
2	Bangladesh	3	1	1	1	2	4	−2	4	Advance to knockout stage
3	Thailand	3	0	2	1	2	3	−1	2	
4	Qatar	3	0	1	2	1	8	−7	1	

Source: Asian Games 2018
Rules for classification: Group stage tiebreakers

==== Group C ====
Pos	Team	Pld	W	D	L	GF	GA	GD	Pts	Qualification
1	China	3	3	0	0	11	1	+10	9	Advance to knockout stage
2	Syria	3	2	0	1	6	5	+1	6	Advance to knockout stage
3	United Arab Emirates	3	1	0	2	5	4	+1	3	Advance to knockout stage
4	East Timor	3	0	0	3	3	15	−12	0	
5	Iraq	0	0	0	0	0	0	0	0	Withdrew, replaced by UAE

Source: Asian Games 2018
Rules for classification: Group stage tiebreakers

==== Group D ====
Pos	Team	Pld	W	D	L	GF	GA	GD	Pts	Qualification
1	Vietnam	3	3	0	0	6	0	+6	9	Advance to knockout stage
2	Japan	3	2	0	1	5	1	+4	6	Advance to knockout stage
3	Pakistan	3	1	0	2	2	8	−6	3	
4	Nepal	3	0	0	3	1	5	−4	0	

Source: Asian Games 2018
Rules for classification: Group stage tiebreakers

==== Group E ====
Pos	Team	Pld	W	D	L	GF	GA	GD	Pts	Qualification
1	Malaysia	3	2	0	1	7	5	+2	6 (Note: Head-to-head result: Malaysia 2–1 South Korea.)	Advance to knockout stage
2	South Korea	3	2	0	1	8	2	+6	6	Advance to knockout stage
3	Bahrain	3	1	1	1	5	10	−5	4	Advance to knockout stage
4	Kyrgyzstan	3	0	1	2	3	6	−3	1	
5	United Arab Emirates	0	0	0	0	0	0	0	0	Redrawn to Group C

Source: Asian Games 2018
Rules for classification: Group stage tiebreakers

==== Group F ====
Pos	Team	Pld	W	D	L	GF	GA	GD	Pts	Qualification
1	Iran	3	1	1	1	3	2	+1	4	Advance to knockout stage
2	North Korea	3	1	1	1	4	4	0	4	Advance to knockout stage
3	Saudi Arabia	3	1	1	1	3	3	0	4	Advance to knockout stage
4	Myanmar	3	1	1	1	3	4	−1	4	

Source: Asian Games 2018
Rules for classification: Group stage tiebreakers

=== Ranking of third-placed teams ===
Pos	Grp	Team	Pld	W	D	L	GF	GA	GD	Pts	Qualification
1	A	Hong Kong	3	1	1	1	5	5	0	4	Advance to knockout stage
2	F	Saudi Arabia	3	1	1	1	3	3	0	4	Advance to knockout stage
3	E	Bahrain	3	1	1	1	5	10	−5	4	Advance to knockout stage
4	C	United Arab Emirates	3	1	0	2	5	4	+1	3	Advance to knockout stage
5	D	Pakistan	3	1	0	2	2	8	−6	3	
6	B	Thailand	3	0	2	1	2	3	−1	2	

Source: Asian Games 2018 Archived 11 August 2018 at the Wayback Machine
Rules for classification: 1) points; 2) goal difference; 3) goals scored; 4) fair play points; 5) drawing of lots.

=== Knockout stage ===
Round of 16
23 August – Bekasi
Palestine	0
Syria	1
23 August – Bekasi
Vietnam	1
Bahrain	0
23 August – Cikarang
Uzbekistan	3
Hong Kong	0
23 August – Cikarang
Iran	0
South Korea	2
24 August – Bekasi
China	3
Saudi Arabia	4
24 August – Bekasi
Malaysia	0
Japan	1
24 August – Cikarang
Indonesia	2 (3)
United Arab Emirates (p)	2 (4)
24 August – Cikarang
Bangladesh	1
North Korea	3

Quarter-finals
27 August – Bekasi
Syria	0
Vietnam (a.e.t.)	1
27 August – Bekasi
Uzbekistan	3
South Korea (a.e.t.)	4
27 August – Cibinong
Saudi Arabia	1
Japan	2
27 August – Cibinong
United Arab Emirates (p)	1 (5)
North Korea	1 (3)

Semi-finals
29 August – Cibinong
Vietnam	1
South Korea	3
29 August – Cibinong
Japan	1
United Arab Emirates	0

Gold medal match
1 September – Cibinong
South Korea (a.e.t.)	2
Japan	1
Bronze medal match
1 September – Cibinong
Vietnam	1 (3)
United Arab Emirates (p)	1 (4)

== Women's competition ==
The competition consisted of two stages; a group stage followed by a knockout stage.

=== Group stage ===
==== Group A ====
Pos	Team	Pld	W	D	L	GF	GA	GD	Pts	Qualification
1	South Korea	3	3	0	0	22	1	+21	9	Advance to Knockout stage
2	Chinese Taipei	3	2	0	1	12	2	+10	6	Advance to Knockout stage
3	Indonesia (H)	3	1	0	2	6	16	−10	3	
4	Maldives	3	0	0	3	0	21	−21	0	

Source: Asian Games 2018
Rules for classification: Group stage tiebreakers
(H) Hosts

==== Group B ====
Pos	Team	Pld	W	D	L	GF	GA	GD	Pts	Qualification
1	China	3	3	0	0	25	0	+25	9	Advance to Knockout stage
2	North Korea	3	2	0	1	24	2	+22	6	Advance to Knockout stage
3	Hong Kong	3	1	0	2	6	16	−10	3	Advance to Knockout stage
4	Tajikistan	3	0	0	3	1	38	−37	0	

Source: Asian Games 2018
Rules for classification: Group stage tiebreakers

==== Group C ====
Pos	Team	Pld	W	D	L	GF	GA	GD	Pts	Qualification
1	Japan	2	2	0	0	9	0	+9	6	Advance to Knockout stage
2	Vietnam	2	1	0	1	3	9	−6	3	Advance to Knockout stage
3	Thailand	2	0	0	2	2	5	−3	0	Advance to Knockout stage

Source: Asian Games 2018
Rules for classification: Group stage tiebreakers

=== Ranking of third-placed teams ===
Pos	Grp	Team	Pld	W	D	L	GF	GA	GD	Pts	Qualification
1	C	Thailand	2	0	0	2	2	5	−3	0	Advance to knockout stage
2	B	Hong Kong	2	0	0	2	0	15	−15	0	Advance to knockout stage
3	A	Indonesia	2	0	0	2	0	16	−16	0	

Source: Asian Games 2018 Archived 26 August 2018 at the Wayback Machine
Rules for classification: 1) points; 2) goal difference; 3) goals scored; 4) fair play points; 5) drawing of lots.

=== Knockout stage ===
Quarter-finals
24 August – Palembang
South Korea	5
Hong Kong	0
25 August – Palembang
Japan	2
North Korea	1
24 August – Palembang
Chinese Taipei (p)	0 (4)
Vietnam	0 (3)
25 August – Palembang
China	5
Thailand	0

Semi-finals
28 August – Palembang
South Korea	1
Japan	2
28 August – Palembang
Chinese Taipei	0
China	1

Gold medal match
31 August – Palembang
Japan	1
China	0
Bronze medal match
31 August – Palembang
South Korea	4
Chinese Taipei	0
