= United Arab Emirates at the 2018 Asian Games =

- IOC code: UAE
- NOC: United Arab Emirates National Olympic Committee
- Website: www.uaenoc.net

in Jakarta and Palembang August 18 – September 2
- Competitors: 114 in 20 sports
- Flag bearer: Latifa Al Hosani
- Officials: 79
- Medals Ranked 20th: Gold 3 Silver 6 Bronze 5 Total 14

Asian Games appearances (overview)
- 1978; 1982; 1986; 1990; 1994; 1998; 2002; 2006; 2010; 2014; 2018; 2022; 2026

The United Arab Emirates competed at the 2018 Asian Games in Jakarta and Palembang, Indonesia, from 18 August to 2 September 2018. The United Arab Emirates National Olympic Committee announced a delegation of 217 members for the Games, with 138 athletes represented the country across 23 sports.

== Medalists ==
The following United Arab Emirates competitors won medals at the Games.

Medal	Name	Sport	Event	Date
Gold	Ali Al-Lanjawi	Jet ski	Runabout limited	August 23
Gold	Hamad Nawad	Ju-jitsu	Men's 56 kg	August 24
Gold	Faisal Al-Ketbi	Ju-jitsu	Men's 94 kg	August 25
Silver	Khalid Al-Blooshi	Ju-jitsu	Men's 56 kg	August 24
Silver	Talib Al-Kirbi	Ju-jitsu	Men's 69 kg	August 24
Silver	Mahra Al-Hinaai	Ju-jitsu	Women's 49 kg	August 24
Silver	Omar Al-Fadhli	Ju-jitsu	Men's 62 kg	August 25
Silver	Ali Al-Lanjawi	Jet ski	Endurance runabout open	August 26
Silver	Khalfan Balhol	Ju-jitsu	Men's 85 kg	August 26
Bronze	Said Al-Mazrouei	Ju-jitsu	Men's 62 kg	August 25
Bronze	Mohamed Al-Qubaisi	Ju-jitsu	Men's 77 kg	August 26
Bronze	Saif Bin Futtais	Shooting	Men's skeet	August 26
Bronze	Victor Scvortov	Judo	Men's 73 kg	August 30
Bronze	Sultan Al-Mantheri; Abdulla Al-Hammadi; Ahmed Rashed; Ismael Khaled; Majed Suroor; Ahmed Al Attas; Jassim Al-Balooshi; Khaled Ibrahim; Ali Al-Yahyaee; Abdulrahman Al-Ameri; Abdullah Ghanem; Mohammed Al Attas; Husain Abdulla Omar; Mohamed Al-Shamsi; Hamad Al-Jasmi; Mohammed Khalvan; Shahin Suroor; Zayed Al-Ameri; Rashed Mohammed; Salem Sultan	Football	Men's tournament	September 1

Medals by sport
Sport	1st place, gold medalist(s)	2nd place, silver medalist(s)	3rd place, bronze medalist(s)	Total
Football	0	0	1	1
Jet ski	1	1	0	2
Ju-jitsu	2	5	2	9
Judo	0	0	1	1
Shooting	0	0	1	1
Total	3	6	5	14

Medals by day
Day	Date	1st place, gold medalist(s)	2nd place, silver medalist(s)	3rd place, bronze medalist(s)	Total
1	August 19	0	0	0	0
2	August 20	0	0	0	0
3	August 21	0	0	0	0
4	August 22	0	0	0	0
5	August 23	1	0	0	1
6	August 24	1	3	0	4
7	August 25	1	1	1	3
8	August 26	0	2	2	4
9	August 27	0	0	0	0
10	August 28	0	0	0	0
11	August 29	0	0	0	0
12	August 30	0	0	1	1
13	August 31	0	0	0	0
14	September 1	0	0	1	1
15	September 2	0	0	0	0
Total		3	6	5	14

== Competitors ==
Following is a list of the numbers of competitors who represented the United Arab Emirates at the Games:

Sport	Men	Women	Total
Archery	2	2	4
Athletics	3	2	5
Basketball	0	0	0
Boxing	3	0	3
Cycling	6	0	6
Equestrian	2	2	4
Fencing	2	2	4
Football	20	0	20
Golf	1	1	2
Jet ski	6	0	6
Ju-jitsu	11	4	15
Judo	3	0	3
Karate	2	1	3
Rowing	3	0	3
Rugby sevens	11	0	11
Sailing	2	1	3
Shooting	10	4	14
Table tennis	3	0	3
Taekwondo	1	0	1
Triathlon	2	0	2
Weightlifting	1	1	2
Total	94	20	114

== Archery ==
Recurve

Athlete	Event	Ranking round		Round of 64	Round of 32	Round of 16	Quarterfinals	Semifinals	Final / BM	
Athlete	Event	Score	Seed	Opposition Score	Opposition Score	Opposition Score	Opposition Score	Opposition Score	Opposition Score	Rank
Ahmed Al-Kaabi	Men's individual	560	45	Bataa (MGL); L 0–6	Did not advance					
Hamdan Al-Mansoori	Men's individual	586	43	Pak (PRK); L 0–6	Did not advance					
Alya Al-Ahmed	Women's individual	530	40	Sharbekova (KGZ); L 2–6	Did not advance					
Ghalia Al-Blooshi	Women's individual	503	41	Altangerel (MGL); L 0–6	Did not advance					
Hamdan Al-Mansoori; Alya Al-Ahmed	Mixed team	1116	21	—N/a	Bangladesh; L 4–6	Did not advance				

== Athletics ==
The UAE entered five athletes (3 men's and 2 women's) to participate in the athletics competition at the Games.

== Basketball ==
The UAE NOC announced that a men's team will compete at the 5x5 basketball competition.

== Boxing ==
Men

Athlete	Event	Round of 32	Round of 16	Quarterfinals	Semifinals	Final	Rank
Athlete	Event	Opposition Result	Opposition Result	Opposition Result	Opposition Result	Opposition Result	Rank
Sultan Al-Nuami	–52 kg	A Mahmetov (KAZ); WO	Did not advance				
Majid Al-Naqbi	–56 kg	Naqeebullah (PAK); L 0–3	Did not advance				
Fahad Hassan	–60 kg	Lai C-e (TPE); L 0–5	Did not advance				

== Cycling ==
=== Road ===
Athlete	Event	Final	
Athlete	Event	Time	Rank
Saif Al-Kaabi	Men's road race	3:47:38	54
Ahmed Al-Mansoori	Men's road race	3:47:38	53
Mohammed Al-Mansoori	Men's road race	3:47:38	55
Yousif Mirza	Men's road race	3:29:10	23
Hassan Al-Marwi	Men's time trial	1:08:59.50	17

=== Track ===
Pursuit

Athlete	Event	Qualification		Round 1		Final	
Athlete	Event	Time	Rank	Opposition Time	Rank	Opposition Time	Rank
Yousif Mirza; Ahmed Al-Mansoori; Mohammed Al-Mansoori; Mohammed Al-Murawwi	Men's team pursuit	4:20.084	8 Q	Japan (JPN); L	6	Did not advance	

Qualification legend: FA=Gold medal final; FB=Bronze medal final

Omnium

Athlete	Event	Scratch race		Tempo race		Elimination race		Points race		Total points	Rank
Athlete	Event	Rank	Points	Rank	Points	Rank	Points	Rank	Points	Total points	Rank
Yousif Mirza	Men's omnium	12	18	8	4	10	22	7	8	74	10

Madison

Athlete	Event	Points	Laps	Rank
Yousif Mirza; Ahmed Al-Mansoori	Men's madison	−35	−40	9

== Equestrian ==
Jumping

Athlete	Horse	Event	Qualification		Qualifier 1			Qualifier 2 Team Final			Final round A			Final round B		
Athlete	Horse	Event	Points	Rank	Penalties	Total	Rank	Penalties	Total	Rank	Penalties	Total	Rank	Penalties	Total	Rank
Hamad Ali Al-Kirbi	Quel Cadans Z	Individual	3.96	12	0	3.96	7 Q	0	3.96	6 Q	0	3.96	4 Q	4	7.96	6
Mohamed Al-Remeithi	Denitha	Individual	8.86 #	35	4	12.86	24 Q	4 #	16.86	24	Did not advance					
Latifah Al Maktoum	Cobolt 8	Individual	2.97	9	4	6.97	14 Q	4	10.97	17 Q	0	10.97	9 Q	0	10.97	7
Nadia Taryam	Cortado	Individual	5.43	22	6 #	11.43	21 Q	4	15.43	22 Q	5	20.43	18	Did not advance		
Latifah Al Maktoum; Nadia Taryam; Hamad Ali Al-Kirbi; Mohamed Al-Remeithi	See above	Team	12.36	4	8	20.36	4 Q	8	28.36	5	—N/a					

# – indicates that the score of this rider does not count in the team competition, since only the best three results of a team are counted.

== Fencing ==
Individual

Athlete	Event	Preliminary		Round of 32	Round of 16	Quarterfinals	Semifinals	Final	
Athlete	Event	Opposition Score	Rank	Opposition Score	Opposition Score	Opposition Score	Opposition Score	Opposition Score	Rank
Abdullah Al-Hammadi	Men's épée	MR Tadi (IRI): L 4–5; Park S-y (KOR): W 5–4; E Dulguun (MGL): L 4–5; Shi GF (CHN): L 3–5; FP Vag-Urminsky (CAM): W 5–3; K Juengamnuaychai (THA): W 5–2	4 Q	Nguyễn PĐ (VIE); L 12–13	Did not advance				20
Ali Al-Hammadi	Men's sabre	N Karim (KAZ): L 1–5; Gu B-g (KOR): L 0–5; S Kitsiriboon (THA): L 1–5; K Tokunan (JPN): L 0–5	5	Did not advance					22
Reem Alshamma	Women's épée	W Al-Bdulla (QAT): W 5–4; K Hsieh (HKG): L 1–5; Zhu MY (CHN): L 0–5; VA Lim (SGP): L 2–5; W Takhamwong (THA): L 1–5	5	Did not advance					26
Latifa Al-Hosani	Women's foil	M Shaito (LBN): L 0–5; Ho PI (MAC): L 0–5; Cheng H (TPE): L 0–5; Jeon H-s (KOR): L 0–5; N Aini (INA): L 2–5; Liu YW (HKG): L 4–5	7	Did not advance					23

== Football ==
Summary

Team	Event	Group stage				Round of 16	Quarterfinal	Semifinal	Final / BM	
Team	Event	Opposition Score	Opposition Score	Opposition Score	Rank	Opposition Score	Opposition Score	Opposition Score	Opposition Score	Rank
UAE men's	Men's tournament	Syria; L 0–1	Timor-Leste; W 4–1	China; L 1–2	3 Q	Indonesia; W 2–2 PSO 4–3	North Korea; W 1–1 PSO 5–3	Japan; L 0–1	Vietnam; W 1–1 PSO 4–3	3rd place, bronze medalist(s)

=== Men's tournament ===
The draw for the men's football event was held on 5 July 2018 initially with involving 24 teams. The teams seeded into four pots with six teams each classified in those pots. However the initial draw was scratched due to the omission of both UAE and Palestine due to the by mistakes of the game organisers. It was earlier proved that both of the football associations of Palestine and United Arab Emirates correctly submitted their participation form on time before the deadline. Due to these errors, the tournament's draw result was rescheduled and reconfirmed on 25 July 2018 with Palestine added to the Group A alongside hosts Indonesia and UAE was added to Group E.

However another redraw was held again for the men's football team event on 3 August 2018 due to the sudden withdrawal of Iraq national football team and it was decided to move either UAE or Palestine to Group C.

Roster

The following is the United Arab Emirates squad in the men's football tournament of the 2018 Asian Games. Mohammed Khalfan, who was originally in the squad announced earlier, was dropped from the squad as a result of indiscipline shown in the friendly match against Malaysia on 10 August 2018.

Head coach: (Poland) Maciej Skorża

No.	Pos.	Player	Date of birth (age)	Club
1	GK	Sultan Al-Mantheri	5 January 1995 (aged 23)	(United Arab Emirates Football Association) Al-Wasl
2	DF	Abdullah Al-Noubi	18 March 1995 (aged 23)	(United Arab Emirates Football Association) Al-Fujairah
3	DF	Ahmed Rashed (captain)	19 January 1997 (aged 21)	(United Arab Emirates Football Association) Al-Wahda
4	DF	Salem Sultan*	9 May 1993 (aged 25)	(United Arab Emirates Football Association) Al-Wahda
5	DF	Ismael Khaled	15 June 1997 (aged 21)	(United Arab Emirates Football Association) Shabab Al-Ahli
6	DF	Majed Suroor	14 October 1997 (aged 20)	(United Arab Emirates Football Association) Sharjah
7	FW	Ahmed Al Attas	28 September 1995 (aged 22)	(United Arab Emirates Football Association) Shabab Al-Ahli
10	MF	Jassem Yaqoub	16 March 1997 (aged 21)	(United Arab Emirates Football Association) Al-Nasr
12	DF	Khaled Ibrahim	17 January 1997 (aged 21)	(United Arab Emirates Football Association) Al-Wahda
16	FW	Ali Eid	1 March 1998 (aged 20)	(United Arab Emirates Football Association) Al-Ain
17	GK	Abdulrahman Al-Ameri	30 April 1998 (aged 20)	(United Arab Emirates Football Association) Al-Jazira
18	MF	Abdullah Ghanem	21 May 1995 (aged 23)	(United Arab Emirates Football Association) Sharjah
19	DF	Mohammed Al Attas	5 August 1997 (aged 21)	(United Arab Emirates Football Association) Al-Jazira
20	MF	Husain Abdulla Omar	11 January 1997 (aged 21)	(United Arab Emirates Football Association) Al-Ain
22	GK	Mohamed Al-Shamsi	4 January 1997 (aged 21)	(United Arab Emirates Football Association) Al-Wahda
23	DF	Hamad Al-Jasmi	11 January 1997 (aged 21)	(United Arab Emirates Football Association) Sharjah
24	FW	Mohammed Khalvan*	29 December 1992 (aged 25)	(United Arab Emirates Football Association) Al Fujairah
26	MF	Shahin Suroor	21 June 1996 (aged 22)	(United Arab Emirates Football Association) Al-Ittihad
27	FW	Zaid Al-Ameri	14 January 1997 (aged 21)	(United Arab Emirates Football Association) Al-Jazira
29	MF	Rashed Mohammed	6 December 1995 (aged 22)	(United Arab Emirates Football Association) Al-Nasr

* Over-aged player.

Group C

Pos	Team	Pld	W	D	L	GF	GA	GD	Pts	Qualification
1	China	3	3	0	0	11	1	+10	9	Advance to knockout stage
2	Syria	3	2	0	1	6	5	+1	6	Advance to knockout stage
3	United Arab Emirates	3	1	0	2	5	4	+1	3	Advance to knockout stage
4	East Timor	3	0	0	3	3	15	−12	0	
5	Iraq	0	0	0	0	0	0	0	0	Withdrew, replaced by UAE

Source: Asian Games 2018
Rules for classification: Group stage tiebreakers
14 August 2018
19:00 UTC+7

United Arab Emirates	0–1	Syria
	Report	Barakat 53'

Jalak Harupat Stadium, Soreang
Referee: Aziz Asimov (Uzbekistan)

16 August 2018
16:00 UTC+7

East Timor	1–4	United Arab Emirates
Gama 87'	Report	Suroor 2'; Sultan 10'; Z. Al-Ameri 19', 61'

Jalak Harupat Stadium, Soreang
Referee: Nasrullo Kabirov (Tajikistan)

19 August 2018
19:00 UTC+7

United Arab Emirates	1–2	China
Khalvan 32'	Report	Wei Shihao 38'; Yao Junsheng 71'

Jalak Harupat Stadium, Soreang
Referee: Timur Faizullin (Kyrgyzstan)

Round of 16

24 August 2018
16:00 UTC+7

Indonesia	2–2 (a.e.t.)	United Arab Emirates
Beto 52'; Lilipaly 90+5'	Report	Z. Al-Ameri 20' (pen.), 65' (pen.)
Penalties
Lilipaly (penalty scored); Septian (penalty missed); Beto (penalty scored); Saddil (penalty missed); Hargianto (penalty scored)	3–4	(penalty scored) Al-Attas; (penalty scored) Z. Al-Ameri; (penalty scored) Ibrahim; (penalty missed) Ghanem; (penalty scored) Omar

Wibawa Mukti Stadium, Cikarang
Referee: Shaun Evans (Australia)

Quarter-final

27 August 2018
19:30 UTC+7

United Arab Emirates	1–1 (a.e.t.)	North Korea
Al-Yahyaee 67'	Report	Kim Yu-song 63'
Penalties
Al-Attas (penalty scored); Z. Al-Ameri (penalty scored); Ibrahim (penalty scored); Omar (penalty scored); Mohammed (penalty scored)	5–3	(penalty scored) Kim Yu-song; (penalty scored) Jang Kuk-chol; (penalty scored) Ri Un-chol; (penalty missed) So Jong-hyok

Pakansari Stadium, Cibinong
Referee: Aziz Asimov (Uzbekistan)

Semi-final

29 August 2018
19:30 UTC+7

Japan	1–0	United Arab Emirates
Ueda 78'	Report

Pakansari Stadium, Cibinong
Referee: Yu Ming-hsun (Chinese Taipei)

Bronze medal match

1 September 2018
15:00 UTC+7

Vietnam	1–1	United Arab Emirates
Nguyễn Văn Quyết 27'	Report	Al-Attas 17'
Penalties
Vũ Văn Thanh (penalty scored); Nguyễn Quang Hải (penalty missed); Hà Đức Chinh (penalty scored); Phan Văn Đức (penalty scored); Trần Minh Vương (penalty missed)	3–4	(penalty scored) Al-Attas; (penalty scored) Z. Al-Ameri; (penalty scored) Ibrahim; (penalty scored) Suroor

Pakansari Stadium, Cibinong
Referee: Kim Dae-yong (South Korea)

== Golf ==
UAE Golf Federation represented by two young golfers (1 men's and 1 women's) who competed in the individual event.

Athlete	Event	Round 1	Round 2	Round 3	Round 4	Total		
Athlete	Event	Score	Score	Score	Score	Score	Par	Rank
Mohamed Al-Hajeri	Men's Individual	78	81	82	86	327	+39	78
Reema Al-Heloo	Women's Individual	91	89	85	92	357	+69	39

== Jet ski ==
UAE entered six jet skiers at the Games. Ali Al-Lanjawi claimed a gold and a silver for the contingent in the runabout limited and endurance open respectively.

Athlete	Event	Moto Points				Ded.	Total	Rank
Athlete	Event	1	2	3	4	Ded.	Total	Rank
Ali Al-Lanjawi	Runabout limited	53	60	53	39	—N/a	205	1st place, gold medalist(s)
Mohsin Mohamed	Runabout limited	30	38	39	43	—N/a	142	8
Sultan Al-Hammadi	Runabout 1100 stock	24	24	48	30	—N/a	126	8
Khalid Al-Maazmi	Runabout 1100 stock	43	36	53	39	—N/a	171	4
Ali Al-Lanjawi	Runabout endurance open	332	400	400	—N/a	–5	1127	2nd place, silver medalist(s)
Manea Al-Marzooqi	Runabout endurance open	352	352	340	—N/a	–5	1039	6
Abdalla Al-Hammadi	Ski modified	39	36	48	43	—N/a	166	4
Sultan Al-Hammadi	Ski modified	36	33	53	36	—N/a	158	5

== Ju-jitsu ==
UAE entered 15 athletes (11 men's and 4 women's) to make their debut at the Asian Games. The UAE team topped the ju-jitsu medals table with two golds, 5 silvers and 2 bronzes.

Key:

- ADV – Won by advantages.
- PNT – Won by penalties.
- RDC – Won by referee decision.
- SUB – Won by submission.

Men

Athlete	Event	Round of 64	Round of 32	Round of 16	Quarterfinals	Semifinals	Repechage	Final / BM	Rank
Athlete	Event	Opposition Result	Opposition Result	Opposition Result	Opposition Result	Opposition Result	Opposition Result	Opposition Result	Rank
Khalid Al-Blooshi	–56 kg	—N/a	Bye	Đào HS (VIE); W 100^{SUB}–0	D Ruziev (UZB); W 4–0	N Seiduali (KAZ); W 5–0	—N/a	H Nawad (UAE); L 0–100^{SUB}	2nd place, silver medalist(s)
Hamad Nawad	–56 kg	—N/a	Bye	A Bekishov (KGZ); W 2–0	A Amirov (UZB); W 4^{RDC}–4	Ö Erdenebaatar (MGL); W 5–3	—N/a	K Al-Blooshi (UAE); W 100^{SUB}–0	1st place, gold medalist(s)
Omar Al-Fadhli	–62 kg	—N/a	A Munfared (BRN); W 4–2	S Abdulnazarov (TJK); W 2–0	AA Uulu (KGZ); W 2–0	F Al-Harahsheh (JOR); W 2–0	—N/a	D Nortayev (KAZ); L 0–0^{ADV}	2nd place, silver medalist(s)
Said Al-Mazrouei	–62 kg	—N/a	Bye	J Mirakhmedov (UZB); W 100–0^{SUB}	M Agaýew (TKM); W 5–0	D Nortayev (KAZ); L 0–4	Bye	D Hilal (LBN); W 2–0	3rd place, bronze medalist(s)
Humaid Al-Kaabi	–69 kg	—N/a	V Khaou (CAM); L 0–100^{SUB}	Did not advance					
Talib Al-Kirbi	–69 kg	—N/a	Bye	A Al-Murdhi (KSA); W 0^{ADV}–0	Z Uranov (KGZ); W 2–0	N Kazhekov (KAZ); W 0^{ADV}–0	—N/a	TB Uulu (KGZ); L 0–2	2nd place, silver medalist(s)
Saoud Al-Hammadi	–77 kg	Bye	A Rahimov (TJK); W 2–0	A Guggenheim (PHI); W 2–0	B Erkhbayar (MGL); L 0–2	Did not advance	A Mustakov (KGZ); W 4–0	A Al-Rasheed (JOR); L 0–0^{PNT}	–
Mohamed Al-Qubaisi	–77 kg	Bye	AH Mehrdil (AFG); W 8–0	RB Algadri (INA); W 4–0	N Alymkulov (KGZ); L 2–2^{ADV}	Did not advance	T Mönkh (MGL); W 4–0	B Erkhbayar (MGL); W 0^{ADV}–0	3rd place, bronze medalist(s)
Khalfan Balhol	–85 kg	—N/a	Bye	A Saud (KSA); W 100^{SUB}–0	A Abdulloev (TJK); W 11–0	M Murtazaliev (KGZ); W 2–0	—N/a	H Al-Rasheed (JOR); WO	2nd place, silver medalist(s)
Mohamed Haitham Radhi	–85 kg	—N/a	Bye	Q Maraaba (PLE); L 0–2	Did not advance				
Faisal Al-Ketbi	–94 kg	—N/a	Bye	M Ghareeb (BRN); W 3–0	MA Noor (INA); W 100^{SUB}–0	Hwang M-s (KOR); W 0^{ADV}–0	—N/a	Z Granduke (JOR); W 0^{RDC}–0	1st place, gold medalist(s)

Women

Athlete	Event	Round of 32	Round of 16	Quarterfinals	Semifinals	Repechage	Final / BM	Rank
Athlete	Event	Opposition Result	Opposition Result	Opposition Result	Opposition Result	Opposition Result	Opposition Result	Rank
Mahra Al-Hinaai	–49 kg	Bye	A Sanjar (AFG); DSQ	M Bayarmaa (MGL); W 0^{ADV}–0	Dương TTM (VIE); W 14–0	—N/a	J Khan (CAM); L 0–100^{SUB}	2nd place, silver medalist(s)
Wadima Al-Yafei	–49 kg	Bye	B Khorloo (MGL); DSQ	K Napolis (PHI); L 0–100^{SUB}	Did not advance	N Pirhadi (IRI); W 6–3	Dương TTM (VIE); L 0–3	–
Bashayer Al-Matrooshi	–62 kg	F Sultani (AFG); W 100^{SUB}–0	F Al-Zahrani (KSA); DSQ	W Krowýakowa (TKM); L 0–7	Did not advance	S Julia (INA); L 0–2	Did not advance	
Hessa Al-Shamsi	–62 kg	Bye	M Ooi (SGP); W 0^{ADV}–0	T Udval (MGL); L 0–3	Did not advance	Y Kakish (JOR); L 0–100^{SUB}	Did not advance	

== Judo ==
Key:

- 1st number — Ippon
- 2nd number — Waza-ari
- s — Shido

Men

Athlete	Event	Round of 32	Round of 16	Quarterfinals	Semifinals	Repechage	Final / BM	Rank
Athlete	Event	Opposition Result	Opposition Result	Opposition Result	Opposition Result	Opposition Result	Opposition Result	Rank
Victor Scvortov	–73 kg	Bye	S Hamad (KSA); W 11–00	G Boboev (UZB); W 11s1–00s2	S Ono (JPN); L 00–10	Bye	B Rysmambetov (KGZ); W 10s1–00s2	3rd place, bronze medalist(s)
Sergiu Toma	–90 kg	Bye	S Sabirov (UZB); L 00s1–10s1	Did not advance				
Ivan Remarenco	–100 kg	Bye	A Singh (IND); W 10–00s1	V Demyanenko (KAZ); W 01–00s1	Cho G-h (KOR); L 00s3–10	Bye	S Juraev (UZB); L 00s1–10	–

== Karate ==
UAE participated in the karate competition at the Games with three athletes (2 men's and 1 women).

== Rowing ==
Men

Athlete	Event	Heats		Repechage		Final	
Athlete	Event	Time	Rank	Time	Rank	Time	Rank
Hamad Al-Matrooshi	Lightweight single sculls	8:17.19	6 R	8:35.39	5 FB	8:06.51	10
Ahmed Al-Hammadi; Mubarak Al-Yassi	Lightweight double sculls	7:48.08	4 R	8:07.84	5	Did not advance	7

== Rugby Sevens ==
United Arab Emirates men's team participated in the Games in Group C of the tournament along with Afghanistan, Sri Lanka and South Korea. This is for the first time for the UAE to compete in the rugby sevens at the Asian Games.

Team	Event	Preliminary	Standing	Classification (Pl.)	Rank	Quarterfinal	Semifinal / Pl.	Final / BM / Pl.	
Team	Event	Opposition Score	Standing	Opposition Score	Rank	Opposition Score	Opposition Score	Opposition Score	Rank
UAE men's	Men's tournament	Group C Sri Lanka: L 0–68; Afghanistan: L 0–36; South Korea: L 0–51	4	Afghanistan: L 0–50; Indonesia: L 5–48; Pakistan: L 0–74	12	Did not advance			

=== Men's tournament ===
Squad

The following is the United Arab Emirates squad in the men's rugby sevens tournament of the 2018 Asian Games.

Head coach: (New Zealand) Apolosefulutasi Perelini

- Saeed Ibrahim Abdulla Saad
- Mohamed Saeed Al-Shamsi
- Rashed Saqer Al-Marzooqi
- Yousuf Lashkri Mohhammad
- Hassan Ali Al-Noobi
- Majid Mohammed Al-Balooshi
- Abdalla Rabee Salmin
- Ali Matar Al-Sereidi
- Walid Salem Al-Balooshi
- Ahmed Mohammed Al-Areefi
- Ahmad Moosa Al-Shehi

Group C

Pos	Team	Pld	W	D	L	PF	PA	PD	Pts	Qualification
1	South Korea	3	3	0	0	124	31	+93	9	Quarterfinals
2	Sri Lanka	3	2	0	1	130	31	+99	7	Quarterfinals
3	Afghanistan	3	1	0	2	41	78	−37	5	Ranking round 9–12
4	United Arab Emirates	3	0	0	3	0	155	−155	3	Ranking round 9–12

Source: Results

30 August
13:56

Sri Lanka	68–0	United Arab Emirates
Try: Sooriyabandara (2) 1' c, 7' c Muthuthanthri 3' c Piyarathna 6' c Dayan (2) 8' c, 14' c Perera (3) 10' m, 11' c, 12' c Sooriyarachchi 14+' c Con: Sooriyabandara (1/1); Ratwatte (5/6); Muthuthanthri (1/1); Sooriyarachchi (2/2)

Gelora Bung Karno Rugby Field, Jakarta
Referee: Craig Chan (Canada)

30 August
17:36

United Arab Emirates	0–36	Afghanistan
		Try: Gazang (2) 2' m, 7' c Zak. Slaimankhel 3' m Sayed 5' m O. Slaimankhel 12' c Azizi 14' c Con: Gazang (0/1); O. Slaimankhel (3/5)

Gelora Bung Karno Rugby Field, Jakarta
Referee: Patrick Kwok (Hong Kong)

31 August
14:40

South Korea	51–0	United Arab Emirates
Try: Jang J. (4) 4' m, 4' c, 7' c, 9' m Kim N. 5' m Hwang 8' m Chang (2) 12' m, 14' m Han 14+' c Con: Lee (2/3); Kim N. (0/1); Kim S. (0/4); Kim J.H. (1/1)

Gelora Bung Karno Rugby Field, Jakarta
Referee: Charlie Brown (Ireland)

Classification round (9–12)

Pos	Team	Pld	W	D	L	PF	PA	PD	Pts
1	Afghanistan	3	3	0	0	94	19	+75	9
2	Pakistan	3	2	0	1	102	20	+82	7
3	Indonesia	3	1	0	2	65	55	+10	5
4	United Arab Emirates	3	0	0	3	5	172	−167	3

Source: Results

31 August
16:30

Afghanistan	50–0	United Arab Emirates
Try: O. Slaimankhel (3) 2' c, 6' c, 9' m Zak. Slaimankhel (2) 3' c, 7+' c Gazang 5' c Rahmani 11' m Hashimi 13' m Con: O. Slaimankhel (5/7); Hashimi (0/1)

Gelora Bung Karno Rugby Field, Jakarta
Referee: Aaqil Jamaldeen (Sri Lanka)

1 September
11:22

Indonesia	48–5	United Arab Emirates
Try: Oiyaitou 1' m Oloan (2) 3' c, 13' c Pratama 5' m Andi 7' m Safrurrozi 10' m Al-Fikri 12' c Wibowo 14' c Con: Oloan (4/8)		Try: Al-Shehi 7+' m Con: Al-Shehi (0/1)

Gelora Bung Karno Rugby Field, Jakarta
Referee: Leow Wei Liang (Singapore)

1 September
17:40

Pakistan	74–0	United Arab Emirates
Try: Aslam (5) 2' c, 5' m, 7' c, 8' c, 14' m Mehmood (4) 6' c, 7+' m, 11' c, 14+' c Gill (2) 10' c, 12' m Akram 11' m Con: Mehmood (4/4); Akram (1/4); Afzal (2/4)

Gelora Bung Karno Rugby Field, Jakarta
Referee: Craig Chan (Canada)

== Sailing ==
Men

Athlete	Event	Race												Total	Rank
Athlete	Event	1	2	3	4	5	6	7	8	9	10	11	12	Total	Rank
Hamza Al-Ali	Laser	13	13	14	14	13	13	13	13	13	~~(15)~~	13	13	145	13

Mixed

Athlete	Event	Race												Total	Rank
Athlete	Event	1	2	3	4	5	6	7	8	9	10	11	12	Total	Rank
Saif Al-Mansoori	Laser 4.7	20	18	21	21	~~(22)~~	22	21	13	17	14	13	22	202	20
Salama Al-Mansoori	Laser 4.7	19	21	~~(23)~~	23	21	20	23	22	20	22	21	21	233	22

== Shooting ==
Men

Athlete	Event	Qualification		Final	
Athlete	Event	Points	Rank	Points	Rank
Ahmed Al-Ameeri	10 m air pistol	560	31	Did not advance	
Othman Al-Blooshi	10 m air pistol	544	37	Did not advance	
Ahmed Al-Hefeiti	10 m air rifle	608.2	37	Did not advance	
Ibrahim Khalil	10 m air rifle	608.7	36	Did not advance	
Hamad Al-Kendi	Trap	116	15	Did not advance	
Saif Al-Shamsi	Trap	112	24	Did not advance	
Khaled Al-Kaabi	Double trap	137	5 Q	24	6
Juma Al-Maktoum	Double trap	DNS			
Mohammad Ahmad	Skeet	120	12	Did not advance	
Saif Bin Futtais	Skeet	121	6 Q	43	3rd place, bronze medalist(s)

Women

Athlete	Event	Qualification		Final	
Athlete	Event	Points	Rank	Points	Rank
Wafa Al-Ali	10 m air pistol	556	27	Did not advance	
Salwa Al-Dhahri	10 m air pistol	553	32	Did not advance	
Latifa Almaazmi	10 m air rifle	598.3	42	Did not advance	
Marwa Mahboob	10 m air rifle	595.8	44	Did not advance	

Mixed team

Athlete	Event	Qualification		Final	
Athlete	Event	Points	Rank	Points	Rank
Ahmed Al-Ameeri; Wafa Al-Ali	10 m air pistol	747	16	Did not advance	
Ahmed Al-Hefeiti; Marwa Mahboob	10 m air rifle	809.7	17	Did not advance	

== Table tennis ==
Individual

Athlete	Event	Round 1	Round 2	Round of 16	Quarterfinals	Semifinals	Final	
Athlete	Event	Opposition Score	Opposition Score	Opposition Score	Opposition Score	Opposition Score	Opposition Score	Rank
Abdulla Al-Balooshi	Men's singles	Nguyễn AT (VIE); L 0–4	Did not advance					
Salah Aldin Al-Balooshi	Men's singles	Xiao ZK (MAC); L 0–4	Did not advance					

Team

Athlete	Event	Group stage					Quarterfinal	Semifinal	Final	
Athlete	Event	Opposition Score	Opposition Score	Opposition Score	Opposition Score	Rank	Opposition Score	Opposition Score	Opposition Score	Rank
Abdulla Al-Balooshi; Essa Al-Blooshi; Salah Aldin Al-Balooshi	Men's	Vietnam (VIE); L 0–3	India (IND); L 0–3	Chinese Taipei (TPE); L 0–3	Macau (MAC); L 1–3	5	Did not advance			

== Taekwondo ==
Kyorugi

Athlete	Event	Round of 32	Round of 16	Quarterfinal	Semifinal	Final	
Athlete	Event	Opposition Score	Opposition Score	Opposition Score	Opposition Score	Opposition Score	Rank
Hassan Shubbar	Men's −63 kg	A Al-Khulaqi (YEM); W 18−15	Ho C-h (TPE); L 1−22	Did not advance			

== Triathlon ==
Individual

Athlete	Event	Swim (1.5 km)	Trans 1	Bike (39.6 km)	Trans 2	Run (10 km)	Total Time	Rank
Ahmad Al-Fahim	Men's	27:39	0:36	1:02:57	0:36	48:14	2:20:02	28
Mohsen Al-Ali	Men's						DSQ	–

== Weightlifting ==
UAE prepared two weightlifters (1 men and 1 women) to compete at the Games. Issa Al Balushi was eliminated from the Games because he did not show up at the weigh-in.

Women

Athlete	Event	Snatch		Clean & jerk		Total	Rank
Athlete	Event	Result	Rank	Result	Rank	Total	Rank
Mai Almadani	−75 kg	59	9	73	9	132	9
