= Football at the 2018 Asian Games – Men's tournament =

Men's Football Tournament at the 2018 Asian Games
Tournament details
- Host country: Indonesia
- Dates: 10 August – 1 September
- Teams: 25 (from 1 confederation)
- Venues: 4 (in 4 host cities)

Final positions
- Champions: South Korea (2nd title)
- Runners-up: Japan
- Third place: United Arab Emirates
- Fourth place: Vietnam

Tournament statistics
- Matches played: 56
- Goals scored: 165 (2.95 per match)
- Top scorer: (South Korea) Hwang Ui-jo (9 goals)

The men's football tournament at the 2018 Asian Games was held from 10 August to 1 September 2018. It was the 17th edition of the men's tournament. In this tournament, 25 teams played in the men's competition. South Korea were the gold medal holders when they won the tournament in 2014. They managed to retain their title.

== Competition schedule ==
The match schedule of the men's tournament was unveiled on 15 February 2018.

G	Group stage	1/8	Round of 16	1/4	Quarter-finals	1/2	Semi-finals	B	Bronze medal match	F	Gold medal match

Fri 10	Sat 11	Sun 12	Mon 13	Tue 14	Wed 15	Thu 16	Fri 17	Sat 18	Sun 19	Mon 20	Tue 21	Wed 22	Thu 23	Fri 24	Sat 25	Sun 26	Mon 27	Tue 28	Wed 29	Thu 30	Fri 31	Sat 1	
G		G		G					G				1/8				1/4		1/2			B	F

== Venues ==
The tournament was held in four venues across four cities.

Soreang	Cibinong	Bekasi	Cikarang
Jalak Harupat	Pakansari	Patriot Chandrabhaga	Wibawa Mukti
Capacity: 27,000	Capacity: 30,000	Capacity: 30,000	Capacity: 28,778
Football at the 2018 Asian Games – Men's tournament is located in West Java

== Squads ==
Each nation must submit a squad of 20 players, 17 of whom must be born on or after 1 January 1995, and three of whom can be older dispensation players.

== Draw ==
The draw for the tournament was held on 5 July 2018 with initially 24 teams involved. The teams were seeded into four pots based on their performances in the previous Asian Games in 2014. The hosts Indonesia were automatically assigned into position A1.

However, the initial draw was declared null and void because the UAE and Palestine had been omitted. The draw was redone on 25 July 2018, and the ceremony reopened in Kuala Lumpur, Malaysia at 3:00 p.m. local time (7:00 a.m. GMT). Palestine were added to Group A and the UAE were added to Group E.

Iraq, which were initially placed in Group C, withdrew after the draw. To re-balance the groups so that every group had at least four teams, a second re-draw was held on 3 August 2018 to determine which of Palestine or UAE would be moved to Group C to replace Iraq: the UAE were drawn.

Pot 1	Pot 2	Pot 3	Pot 4	Pot 5 (additional draw)
1. Indonesia (hosts); 2. South Korea; 3. North Korea; 4. ~~Iraq~~ (withdrew); 5. Thailand; 6. Japan	7. Saudi Arabia; 8. Uzbekistan; 9. Hong Kong; 10. Vietnam; 11. China; 12. Kyrgyzstan	13. Malaysia; 14. Bangladesh; 15. Iran; 16. Pakistan; 17. Laos; 18. Timor-Leste	19. Nepal; 20. Qatar; 21. Bahrain; 22. Syria; 23. Chinese Taipei; 24. Myanmar	25. United Arab Emirates; 26. Palestine

== Group stage ==
The top two teams in each group, and the four third-placed teams among six groups advance to the round of 16.

All times are local, WIB (UTC+7).

=== Tiebreakers ===
Teams in a group are ranked according to points (3 points for a win, 1 point for a draw, 0 points for a loss), and if tied on points, the following tiebreaking criteria are applied, in the order given, to determine the rankings.

1. Highest number of points obtained in all group matches;
2. Highest number of points obtained in the group matches between the teams concerned;
3. Goal difference resulting from the group matches between the teams concerned;
4. Highest number of goals scored from all group matches between the teams concerned;
5. If two or more teams have equal ranking with the criteria so far, reapply the criteria above only for them. If this re-application gives no more ranking, apply the following criteria.
6. Goal difference in all group matches;
7. Highest number of goals scored in all group matches;
8. Kicks from the penalty mark only if two (2) teams are involved and they are both on the field of play.
9. Fewer points of yellow/red cards in all group matches (only one of these deductions shall be applied to a player in a single match):
  - First yellow card: 1 point;
  - Indirect red card (second yellow card): 3 points;
  - Direct red card: 3 points;
  - Yellow card followed by direct red card: 4 points;
10. Drawing of lots

Third-placed teams from the three groups are ranked according to the following criteria, after the result against the fifth-placed team of group A are excluded in order to rank them with the same numbers of matches.

1. Highest number of points obtained in all group matches;
2. Goal difference in all group matches;
3. Highest number of goals scored in all group matches;
4. Fewer points of yellow/red cards in all group matches (only one of these deductions shall be applied to a player in a single match):
  - First yellow card: 1 point;
  - Indirect red card (second yellow card): 3 points;
  - Direct red card: 3 points;
  - Yellow card followed by direct red card: 4 points;
5. Drawing of lots

=== Group A ===
Pos	Team	Pld	W	D	L	GF	GA	GD	Pts	Qualification
1	Indonesia (H)	4	3	0	1	11	3	+8	9	Advance to knockout stage
2	Palestine	4	2	2	0	5	3	+2	8	Advance to knockout stage
3	Hong Kong	4	2	1	1	9	5	+4	7	Advance to knockout stage
4	Laos	4	1	0	3	4	8	−4	3	
5	Chinese Taipei	4	0	1	3	0	10	−10	1	

Source: Asian Games 2018
Rules for classification: Group stage tiebreakers
(H) Hosts
10 August 2018
16:00 UTC+7

Laos	1–3	Hong Kong
Kongmathilath 62'	Report	Cheng Chin Lung 20'; Tan Chun Lok 40'; Lounlasy 86' (o.g.)

Patriot Candrabhaga Stadium, Bekasi
Referee: Timur Faizullin (Kyrgyzstan)
10 August 2018
19:00 UTC+7

Palestine	0–0	Chinese Taipei
	Report

Patriot Candrabhaga Stadium, Bekasi
Referee: Kim Dae-yong (South Korea)

12 August 2018
16:00 UTC+7

Palestine	2–1	Laos
Qumbor 83'; Bahdari 90+5'	Report	Khochalern 14'

Patriot Candrabhaga Stadium, Bekasi
Referee: Bijan Heidari (Iran)
12 August 2018
19:00 UTC+7

Chinese Taipei	0–4	Indonesia
	Report	Lilipaly 67', 76'; Beto 71'; Hargianto 90+3'

Patriot Candrabhaga Stadium, Bekasi
Referee: Ammar Mahfoodh (Bahrain)

15 August 2018
16:00 UTC+7

Hong Kong	4–0	Chinese Taipei
Tan Chun Lok 5', 37'; Tarrés 9', 41'	Report

Patriot Candrabhaga Stadium, Bekasi
Referee: Suhaizi Shukri (Malaysia)
15 August 2018
19:00 UTC+7

Indonesia	1–2	Palestine
Irfan 23'	Report	Dabbagh 16'; Darwish 51'

Patriot Candrabhaga Stadium, Bekasi
Referee: Nivon Robesh Gamini (Sri Lanka)

17 August 2018
16:00 UTC+7

Hong Kong	1–1	Palestine
Lam Ka Wai 57'	Report	Yousef 17'

Patriot Candrabhaga Stadium, Bekasi
Referee: Takuto Okabe (Japan)
17 August 2018
19:00 UTC+7

Laos	0–3	Indonesia
	Report	Beto 14', 47'; Ricky 75'

Patriot Candrabhaga Stadium, Bekasi
Referee: Zaid Thamer Mohammed (Iraq)

20 August 2018
19:00 UTC+7

Indonesia	3–1	Hong Kong
Irfan 46'; Lilipaly 85'; Hanif 90+4'	Report	Lau Hok Ming 39'

Patriot Candrabhaga Stadium, Bekasi
Referee: Aziz Asimov (Uzbekistan)
20 August 2018
19:00 UTC+7

Chinese Taipei	0–2	Laos
	Report	Phommalivong 5'; Bounmalay 74' (pen.)

Pakansari Stadium, Cibinong
Referee: Ali Shaban (Kuwait)

=== Group B ===
Pos	Team	Pld	W	D	L	GF	GA	GD	Pts	Qualification
1	Uzbekistan	3	3	0	0	10	0	+10	9	Advance to knockout stage
2	Bangladesh	3	1	1	1	2	4	−2	4	Advance to knockout stage
3	Thailand	3	0	2	1	2	3	−1	2	
4	Qatar	3	0	1	2	1	8	−7	1	

Source: Asian Games 2018
Rules for classification: Group stage tiebreakers
14 August 2018
16:00 UTC+7

Uzbekistan	3–0	Bangladesh
Urinboev 23'; Khamdamov 57'; Alibaev 66'	Report

Pakansari Stadium, Cibinong
Referee: Ali Shaban (Kuwait)
14 August 2018
19:00 UTC+7

Thailand	1–1	Qatar
Supachai 90+2'	Report	Shehata 6'

Pakansari Stadium, Cibinong
Referee: Yu Ming-hsun (Chinese Taipei)

16 August 2018
16:00 UTC+7

Bangladesh	1–1	Thailand
Sufil 52'	Report	Supachai 80'

Pakansari Stadium, Cibinong
Referee: Ali Reda (Lebanon)
16 August 2018
19:00 UTC+7

Qatar	0–6	Uzbekistan
	Report	Urinboev 37'; Alibaev 43'; Khamdamov 47'; Sidikov 49'; Masharipov 54' (pen.); Abdikholikov 74'

Pakansari Stadium, Cibinong
Referee: Kim Dae-yong (South Korea)

19 August 2018
19:00 UTC+7

Bangladesh	1–0	Qatar
Bhuyan 90+3'	Report

Patriot Candrabhaga Stadium, Bekasi
Referee: Jansen Foo (Singapore)
19 August 2018
19:00 UTC+7

Thailand	0–1	Uzbekistan
	Report	Urinboev 17'

Pakansari Stadium, Cibinong
Referee: Bijan Heidari (Iran)

=== Group C ===
Pos	Team	Pld	W	D	L	GF	GA	GD	Pts	Qualification
1	China	3	3	0	0	11	1	+10	9	Advance to knockout stage
2	Syria	3	2	0	1	6	5	+1	6	Advance to knockout stage
3	United Arab Emirates	3	1	0	2	5	4	+1	3	Advance to knockout stage
4	East Timor	3	0	0	3	3	15	−12	0	
5	Iraq	0	0	0	0	0	0	0	0	Withdrew, replaced by UAE

Source: Asian Games 2018
Rules for classification: Group stage tiebreakers
14 August 2018
16:00 UTC+7

China	6–0	East Timor
Zhang Yuning 4'; Zhang Yuan 20'; Gao Zhunyi 27', 47'; Wei Shihao 33'; Yao Junsheng 36'	Report

Jalak Harupat Stadium, Soreang
Referee: Çarymyrat Kurbanow (Turkmenistan)
14 August 2018
19:00 UTC+7

United Arab Emirates	0–1	Syria
	Report	Barakat 53'

Jalak Harupat Stadium, Soreang
Referee: Aziz Asimov (Uzbekistan)

16 August 2018
16:00 UTC+7

East Timor	1–4	United Arab Emirates
Gama 87'	Report	Suroor 2'; Sultan 10'; Z. Al-Ameri 19', 61'

Jalak Harupat Stadium, Soreang
Referee: Nasrullo Kabirov (Tajikistan)
16 August 2018
19:00 UTC+7

Syria	0–3	China
	Report	Wei Shihao 40'; Zhang Yuning 45+2'; Chen Binbin 66'

Jalak Harupat Stadium, Soreang
Referee: Shaun Evans (Australia)

19 August 2018
19:00 UTC+7

East Timor	2–5	Syria
Gama 15'; Garcia 85'	Report	Hannan 33'; Shalha 42', 54', 90+1'; Koaeh 50'

Wibawa Mukti Stadium, Cikarang
Referee: Zaid Thamer Mohammed (Iraq)
19 August 2018
19:00 UTC+7

United Arab Emirates	1–2	China
Khalvan 32'	Report	Wei Shihao 38'; Yao Junsheng 71'

Jalak Harupat Stadium, Soreang
Referee: Timur Faizullin (Kyrgyzstan)

=== Group D ===
Pos	Team	Pld	W	D	L	GF	GA	GD	Pts	Qualification
1	Vietnam	3	3	0	0	6	0	+6	9	Advance to knockout stage
2	Japan	3	2	0	1	5	1	+4	6	Advance to knockout stage
3	Pakistan	3	1	0	2	2	8	−6	3	
4	Nepal	3	0	0	3	1	5	−4	0	

Source: Asian Games 2018
Rules for classification: Group stage tiebreakers
14 August 2018
16:00 UTC+7

Vietnam	3–0	Pakistan
Nguyễn Quang Hải 21'; Nguyễn Văn Quyết 41'; Nguyễn Công Phượng 72'	Report

Wibawa Mukti Stadium, Cikarang
Referee: Ahmad Yaqoub Ibrahim (Jordan)
14 August 2018
19:00 UTC+7

Japan	1–0	Nepal
Mitoma 7'	Report

Wibawa Mukti Stadium, Cikarang
Referee: Sultan Al-Marzooqi (United Arab Emirates)

16 August 2018
16:00 UTC+7

Pakistan	0–4	Japan
	Report	Iwasaki 2', 35'; Hatate 9'; Maeda 10'

Wibawa Mukti Stadium, Cikarang
Referee: Ammar Mahfoodh (Bahrain)
16 August 2018
19:00 UTC+7

Nepal	0–2	Vietnam
	Report	Nguyễn Anh Đức 31'; Phan Văn Đức 63'

Wibawa Mukti Stadium, Cikarang
Referee: Zhang Lei (China)

19 August 2018
16:00 UTC+7

Pakistan	2–1	Nepal
Bilal 54'; Hussain 72' (pen.)	Report	Younas 12' (o.g.)

Patriot Candrabhaga Stadium, Bekasi
Referee: Baraa Aisha (Palestine)
19 August 2018
16:00 UTC+7

Japan	0–1	Vietnam
	Report	Nguyễn Quang Hải 3'

Wibawa Mukti Stadium, Cikarang
Referee: Lau Fong Hei (Hong Kong)

=== Group E ===
Pos	Team	Pld	W	D	L	GF	GA	GD	Pts	Qualification
1	Malaysia	3	2	0	1	7	5	+2	6 (Note: Head-to-head result: Malaysia 2–1 South Korea.)	Advance to knockout stage
2	South Korea	3	2	0	1	8	2	+6	6	Advance to knockout stage
3	Bahrain	3	1	1	1	5	10	−5	4	Advance to knockout stage
4	Kyrgyzstan	3	0	1	2	3	6	−3	1	
5	United Arab Emirates	0	0	0	0	0	0	0	0	Redrawn to Group C

Source: Asian Games 2018
Rules for classification: Group stage tiebreakers
Notes:
15 August 2018
16:00 UTC+7

Kyrgyzstan	1–3	Malaysia
Batyrkanov 55'	Report	Safawi 38' (pen.); Akhyar 60'; Syafiq 78'

Jalak Harupat Stadium, Soreang
Referee: Lau Fong Hei (Hong Kong)
15 August 2018
19:00 UTC+7

South Korea	6–0	Bahrain
Hwang Ui-jo 17', 36', 43'; Kim Jin-ya 23'; Na Sang-ho 41'; Hwang Hee-chan 90+3'	Report

Jalak Harupat Stadium, Soreang
Referee: Takuto Okabe (Japan)

17 August 2018
16:00 UTC+7

Bahrain	2–2	Kyrgyzstan
Marhoon 20'; Sanad 90+4'	Report	Abdurakhmanov 59'; Batyrkanov 82'

Jalak Harupat Stadium, Soreang
Referee: Nivon Robesh Gamini (Sri Lanka)
17 August 2018
19:00 UTC+7

Malaysia	2–1	South Korea
Safawi 5', 45+1'	Report	Hwang Ui-jo 87'

Jalak Harupat Stadium, Soreang
Referee: Mohammed Al-Hoaish (Saudi Arabia)

20 August 2018
19:00 UTC+7

South Korea	1–0	Kyrgyzstan
Son Heung-min 63'	Report

Jalak Harupat Stadium, Soreang
Referee: Masoud Tufaylieh (Syria)
20 August 2018
19:00 UTC+7

Malaysia	2–3	Bahrain
Syahmi 20'; Safawi 90+3' (pen.)	Report	Al-Hardan 33', 89'; Al-Shamsan 37'

Wibawa Mukti Stadium, Cikarang
Referee: Yu Ming-hsun (Chinese Taipei)

=== Group F ===
Pos	Team	Pld	W	D	L	GF	GA	GD	Pts	Qualification
1	Iran	3	1	1	1	3	2	+1	4	Advance to knockout stage
2	North Korea	3	1	1	1	4	4	0	4	Advance to knockout stage
3	Saudi Arabia	3	1	1	1	3	3	0	4	Advance to knockout stage
4	Myanmar	3	1	1	1	3	4	−1	4	

Source: Asian Games 2018
Rules for classification: Group stage tiebreakers
15 August 2018
16:00 UTC+7

Saudi Arabia	0–0	Iran
	Report

Wibawa Mukti Stadium, Cikarang
Referee: Jansen Foo (Singapore)
15 August 2018
19:00 UTC+7

North Korea	1–1	Myanmar
Jang Kuk-chol 60'	Report	Maung Maung Lwin 44'

Wibawa Mukti Stadium, Cikarang
Referee: Masoud Tufaylieh (Syria)

17 August 2018
16:00 UTC+7

Iran	3–0	North Korea
Roustaei 27'; Ghaedi 68'; Aghasi 90+3' (pen.)	Report

Wibawa Mukti Stadium, Cikarang
Referee: Mahmood Al-Majarafi (Oman)
17 August 2018
19:00 UTC+7

Myanmar	0–3	Saudi Arabia
	Report	Gharib 15' (pen.), 59' (pen.); Al-Banaqi 89'

Wibawa Mukti Stadium, Cikarang
Referee: Çarymyrat Kurbanow (Turkmenistan)

20 August 2018
16:00 UTC+7

Iran	0–2	Myanmar
	Report	Lwin Moe Aung 56'; Htet Phyo Wai 68'

Patriot Candrabhaga Stadium, Bekasi
Referee: Suhaizi Shukri (Malaysia)
20 August 2018
16:00 UTC+7

North Korea	3–0	Saudi Arabia
Kim Yong-il 2'; Kim Yu-song 25', 51'	Report

Wibawa Mukti Stadium, Cikarang
Referee: Nasrullo Kabirov (Tajikistan)

=== Ranking of third-placed teams ===
In order to ensure equality when comparing the third-placed team of all groups, the result of the match against the 5th-placed team in Group A was ignored due to the other groups having only four teams.

Pos	Grp	Team	Pld	W	D	L	GF	GA	GD	Pts	Qualification
1	A	Hong Kong	3	1	1	1	5	5	0	4	Advance to knockout stage
2	F	Saudi Arabia	3	1	1	1	3	3	0	4	Advance to knockout stage
3	E	Bahrain	3	1	1	1	5	10	−5	4	Advance to knockout stage
4	C	United Arab Emirates	3	1	0	2	5	4	+1	3	Advance to knockout stage
5	D	Pakistan	3	1	0	2	2	8	−6	3	
6	B	Thailand	3	0	2	1	2	3	−1	2	

Source: Asian Games 2018 Archived 11 August 2018 at the Wayback Machine
Rules for classification: 1) points; 2) goal difference; 3) goals scored; 4) fair play points; 5) drawing of lots.

== Knockout stage ==
In the knockout stage, extra time and penalty shoot-out would be used to decide the winner if necessary, except for the third place match where penalty shoot-out (no extra time) would be used to decide the winner if necessary.

=== Bracket ===
Round of 16
23 August – Bekasi
Palestine	0
Syria	1
23 August – Bekasi
Vietnam	1
Bahrain	0
23 August – Cikarang
Uzbekistan	3
Hong Kong	0
23 August – Cikarang
Iran	0
South Korea	2
24 August – Bekasi
China	3
Saudi Arabia	4
24 August – Bekasi
Malaysia	0
Japan	1
24 August – Cikarang
Indonesia	2 (3)
United Arab Emirates (p)	2 (4)
24 August – Cikarang
Bangladesh	1
North Korea	3

Quarter-finals
27 August – Bekasi
Syria	0
Vietnam (a.e.t.)	1
27 August – Bekasi
Uzbekistan	3
South Korea (a.e.t.)	4
27 August – Cibinong
Saudi Arabia	1
Japan	2
27 August – Cibinong
United Arab Emirates (p)	1 (5)
North Korea	1 (3)

Semi-finals
29 August – Cibinong
Vietnam	1
South Korea	3
29 August – Cibinong
Japan	1
United Arab Emirates	0

Gold medal match
1 September – Cibinong
South Korea (a.e.t.)	2
Japan	1
Bronze medal match
1 September – Cibinong
Vietnam	1 (3)
United Arab Emirates (p)	1 (4)

=== Round of 16 ===
23 August 2018
16:00 UTC+7

Palestine	0–1	Syria
	Report	Ashkar 73'

Patriot Candrabhaga Stadium, Bekasi
Referee: Ali Shaban (Kuwait)

23 August 2018
16:00 UTC+7

Uzbekistan	3–0	Hong Kong
Alibaev 27'; Sidikov 60'; Urinboev 65'	Report

Wibawa Mukti Stadium, Cikarang
Referee: Sultan Al-Marzooqi (United Arab Emirates)

23 August 2018
19:30 UTC+7

Vietnam	1–0	Bahrain
Nguyễn Công Phượng 88'	Report

Patriot Candrabhaga Stadium, Bekasi
Referee: Zhang Lei (China)

23 August 2018
19:30 UTC+7

Iran	0–2	South Korea
	Report	Hwang Ui-jo 40'; Lee Seung-woo 55'

Wibawa Mukti Stadium, Cikarang
Referee: Ahmad Yaqoub Ibrahim (Jordan)

24 August 2018
16:00 UTC+7

China	3–4	Saudi Arabia
Yao Junsheng 80'; Huang Zichang 88'; Wei Shihao 90+5'	Report	Camara 16', 33', 60'; Al-Selouli 29'

Patriot Candrabhaga Stadium, Bekasi
Referee: Kim Dae-yong (South Korea)

24 August 2018
16:00 UTC+7

Indonesia	2–2 (a.e.t.)	United Arab Emirates
Beto 52'; Lilipaly 90+5'	Report	Z. Al-Ameri 20' (pen.), 65' (pen.)
Penalties
Lilipaly (penalty scored); Septian (penalty missed); Beto (penalty scored); Saddil (penalty missed); Hargianto (penalty scored)	3–4	(penalty scored) Al-Attas; (penalty scored) Z. Al-Ameri; (penalty scored) Ibrahim; (penalty missed) Ghanem; (penalty scored) Omar

Wibawa Mukti Stadium, Cikarang
Referee: Shaun Evans (Australia)

24 August 2018
19:30 UTC+7

Malaysia	0–1	Japan
	Report	Ueda 90' (pen.)

Patriot Candrabhaga Stadium, Bekasi
Referee: Bijan Heidari (Iran)

24 August 2018
19:30 UTC+7

Bangladesh	1–3	North Korea
Saad Uddin 90+1'	Report	Kim Yu-song 14' (pen.); Han Yong-thae 38'; Kang Kuk-chol 68'

Wibawa Mukti Stadium, Cikarang
Referee: Ammar Mahfoodh (Bahrain)

=== Quarter-finals ===
27 August 2018
16:00 UTC+7

Uzbekistan	3–4 (a.e.t.)	South Korea
Masharipov 17'; Alibaev 53', 55'	Report	Hwang Ui-jo 4', 34', 75'; Hwang Hee-chan 118' (pen.)

Patriot Candrabhaga Stadium, Bekasi
Referee: Mohammed Al-Hoaish (Saudi Arabia)

27 August 2018
16:00 UTC+7

Saudi Arabia	1–2	Japan
Tatsuta 39' (o.g.)	Report	Iwasaki 31', 73'

Pakansari Stadium, Cibinong
Referee: Timur Faizullin (Kyrgyzstan)

27 August 2018
19:30 UTC+7

Syria	0–1 (a.e.t.)	Vietnam
	Report	Nguyễn Văn Toàn 108'

Patriot Candrabhaga Stadium, Bekasi
Referee: Bijan Heidari (Iran)

27 August 2018
19:30 UTC+7

United Arab Emirates	1–1 (a.e.t.)	North Korea
Al-Yahyaee 67'	Report	Kim Yu-song 63'
Penalties
Al-Attas (penalty scored); Z. Al-Ameri (penalty scored); Ibrahim (penalty scored); Omar (penalty scored); Mohammed (penalty scored)	5–3	(penalty scored) Kim Yu-song; (penalty scored) Jang Kuk-chol; (penalty scored) Ri Un-chol; (penalty missed) So Jong-hyok

Pakansari Stadium, Cibinong
Referee: Aziz Asimov (Uzbekistan)

=== Semi-finals ===
29 August 2018
16:00 UTC+7

Vietnam	1–3	South Korea
Trần Minh Vương 70'	Report	Lee Seung-woo 7', 55'; Hwang Ui-jo 28'

Pakansari Stadium, Cibinong
Referee: Masoud Tufaylieh (Syria)

29 August 2018
19:30 UTC+7

Japan	1–0	United Arab Emirates
Ueda 78'	Report

Pakansari Stadium, Cibinong
Referee: Yu Ming-hsun (Chinese Taipei)

=== Bronze medal match ===
1 September 2018
15:00 UTC+7

Vietnam	1–1	United Arab Emirates
Nguyễn Văn Quyết 27'	Report	Al-Attas 17'
Penalties
Vũ Văn Thanh (penalty scored); Nguyễn Quang Hải (penalty missed); Hà Đức Chinh (penalty scored); Phan Văn Đức (penalty scored); Trần Minh Vương (penalty missed)	3–4	(penalty scored) Al-Attas; (penalty scored) Z. Al-Ameri; (penalty scored) Ibrahim; (penalty scored) Suroor

Pakansari Stadium, Cibinong
Referee: Kim Dae-yong (South Korea)

=== Gold medal match ===
1 September 2018
18:30 UTC+7

South Korea	2–1 (a.e.t.)	Japan
Lee Seung-woo 93'; Hwang Hee-chan 101'	Report	Ueda 115'

Pakansari Stadium, Cibinong
Referee: Aziz Asimov (Uzbekistan)

== Statistics ==
=== Goalscorers ===
There were 165 goals scored in 56 matches, for an average of 2.95 goals per match.

9 goals

- Hwang Ui-jo (KOR)

5 goals

- Ikromjon Alibaev (UZB)

4 goals

- Wei Shihao (CHN)
- Alberto Gonçalves (INA)
- Stefano Lilipaly (INA)
- Yuto Iwasaki (JPN)
- Lee Seung-woo (KOR)
- Safawi Rasid (MAS)
- Kim Yu-song (PRK)
- Zaid Al-Ameri (UAE)
- Zabikhillo Urinboev (UZB)

3 goals

- Yao Junsheng (CHN)
- Tan Chun Lok (HKG)
- Ayase Ueda (JPN)
- Hwang Hee-chan (KOR)
- Haroune Camara (KSA)
- Abdulhadi Shalha (SYR)

2 goals

- Mohammed Al-Hardan (BHR)
- Gao Zhunyi (CHN)
- Zhang Yuning (CHN)
- Jordi Tarrés (HKG)
- Irfan Jaya (INA)
- Ernist Batyrkanov (KGZ)
- Abdulrahman Gharib (KSA)
- Supachai Jaided (THA)
- Rufino Gama (TLS)
- Dostonbek Khamdamov (UZB)
- Javokhir Sidikov (UZB)
- Jaloliddin Masharipov (UZB)
- Nguyễn Công Phượng (VIE)
- Nguyễn Quang Hải (VIE)
- Nguyễn Văn Quyết (VIE)

1 goal

- Jamal Bhuyan (BAN)
- Mahbubur Rahman Sufil (BAN)
- Saad Uddin (BAN)
- Hamad Al-Shamsan (BHR)
- Mohamed Jasim Marhoon (BHR)
- Ahmed Saleh Sanad (BHR)
- Chen Binbin (CHN)
- Huang Zichang (CHN)
- Zhang Yuan (CHN)
- Cheng Chin Lung (HKG)
- Lau Hok Ming (HKG)
- Lam Ka Wai (HKG)
- Ricky Fajrin (INA)
- Muhammad Hargianto (INA)
- Hanif Sjahbandi (INA)
- Aref Aghasi (IRI)
- Mehdi Ghaedi (IRI)
- Amir Roostaei (IRI)
- Odiljon Abdurakhmanov (KGZ)
- Mutib Al-Banaqi (KSA)
- Saad Al-Selouli (KSA)
- Reo Hatate (JPN)
- Daizen Maeda (JPN)
- Kaoru Mitoma (JPN)
- Chansamone Phommalivong (LAO)
- Phoutthasay Khochalern (LAO)
- Phithack Kongmathilath (LAO)
- Tiny Bounmalay (LAO)
- Akhyar Rashid (MAS)
- Syafiq Ahmad (MAS)
- Syahmi Safari (MAS)
- Htet Phyo Wai (MYA)
- Lwin Moe Aung (MYA)
- Maung Maung Lwin (MYA)
- Muhammad Bilal (PAK)
- Saddam Hussain (PAK)
- Abdelatif Bahdari (PLE)
- Mahmoud Yousef (PLE)
- Mohamed Darwish (PLE)
- Oday Dabbagh (PLE)
- Shehab Qumbor (PLE)
- Han Yong-thae (PRK)
- Jang Kuk-chol (PRK)
- Kang Kuk-chol (PRK)
- Kim Yong-il (PRK)
- Hazem Shehata (QAT)
- Kim Jin-ya (KOR)
- Na Sang-ho (KOR)
- Son Heung-min (KOR)
- Abd Al-Rahman Barakat (SYR)
- Ahmed Ashkar (SYR)
- Kamel Koaeh (SYR)
- Zakria Hannan (SYR)
- Silveiro Garcia (TLS)
- Ahmed Al-Attas (UAE)
- Ali Al-Yahyaee (UAE)
- Mohammed Khalvan (UAE)
- Shahin Suroor (UAE)
- Salem Sultan (UAE)
- Bobur Abdikholikov (UZB)
- Nguyễn Anh Đức (VIE)
- Nguyễn Văn Toàn (VIE)
- Phan Văn Đức (VIE)
- Trần Minh Vương (VIE)

1 own goal

- Yugo Tatsuta (JPN) (against Saudi Arabia)
- Lathasay Lounlasy (LAO) (against Hong Kong)
- Shahbaz Younas (PAK) (against Nepal)

=== Final standing ===
As per statistical convention in football, matches decided in extra time are counted as wins and losses, while matches decided by penalty shoot-outs are counted as draws.
Note: In order to ensure equality, for teams in five-team groups, their match against the fifth-placed teams are excluded when considering the ranking.

Rank	Team	Pld	W	D	L	GF	GA	GD	Pts
1st place, gold medalist(s)	South Korea	7	6	0	1	19	7	+12	18
2nd place, silver medalist(s)	Japan	7	5	0	2	10	4	+6	15
3rd place, bronze medalist(s)	United Arab Emirates	7	1	3	3	9	9	0	6
4	Vietnam	7	5	1	1	10	4	+6	16
Eliminated in the Quarter-finals
5	Uzbekistan	5	4	0	1	16	4	+12	12
6	Syria	5	3	0	2	7	6	+1	9
7	North Korea	5	2	2	1	8	6	+2	8
8	Saudi Arabia	5	2	1	2	8	8	0	7
Eliminated in the Round of 16
9	China	4	3	0	1	14	5	+9	9
10	Indonesia	5	3	1	1	13	5	+8	10
11	Palestine	5	2	2	1	5	4	+1	8
12	Malaysia	4	2	0	2	7	6	+1	6
13	Iran	4	1	1	2	3	4	–1	4
14	Hong Kong	5	2	1	2	9	8	+1	7
15	Bangladesh	4	1	1	2	3	7	–4	4
16	Bahrain	4	1	1	2	5	11	–6	4
Third place in the group stage
17	Pakistan	3	1	0	2	2	8	−6	3
18	Thailand	3	0	2	1	2	3	−1	2
Fourth place in the group stage
19	Myanmar	3	1	1	1	3	4	−1	4
20	Kyrgyzstan	3	0	1	2	3	6	−3	1
21	Qatar	3	0	1	2	1	8	−7	1
22	Nepal	3	0	0	3	1	5	−4	0
23	Laos	4	1	0	3	4	8	−4	3
24	East Timor	3	0	0	3	3	15	−12	0
Fifth place in the group stage
25	Chinese Taipei	4	0	1	3	0	10	−10	1

== See also ==
- Football at the 2018 Asian Games – Women's tournament
