= Al Jazirah Al Hamra Club =

Football club in UAE

Al Jazirah Al Hamra
- Full name: Al Jazirah Al Hamra Sports Club
- Founded: 1968; 58 years ago
- Ground: Al Hamra Stadium; Al Jazirah Al Hamra
- Capacity: 2,000
- Manager: Mehdi Mahdavikia
- League: UAE First Division League
- 2024–25: 10th of 15
| Home colours | Away colours |

Al Jazirah Al Hamra Club (Arabic: نادي الجزيرة الحمراء) is a professional football club located in Al Jazirah Al Hamra, United Arab Emirates. They currently play in the UAE First Division League.

== Current squad ==
As of UAE First Division League:

Note: Flags indicate national team as defined under FIFA eligibility rules; some limited exceptions apply. Players may hold more than one non-FIFA nationality.

| No. | Pos. | Nation | Player |
|---|---|---|---|
| 1 | GK | UAE | Khalil Yousif |
| 2 | DF | UAE | Abdullah Al-Noubi |
| 3 | DF | BRA | Wallace Gomes |
| 5 | DF | MAR | Taoufiq Hannioui |
| 7 | FW | IRI | Sajjad Khademi |
| 8 | MF | SWE | Edmond Gukasian |
| 9 | FW | IRI | Erfan Ghorbani |
| 10 | MF | BRA | Gabriel Valentini |
| 17 | MF | JOR | Khalil Ibrahim |
| 18 | DF | UAE | Jamal Abdulnasser |
| 23 | DF | UAE | Mohammad Sarwashi |
| 26 | MF | GHA | Joseoh Amoah |
| 27 | DF | OMA | Abdulsalam Ben Aref |
| 38 | FW | MAR | Mohamed Rarrhour |

| No. | Pos. | Nation | Player |
|---|---|---|---|
| 50 | DF | UAE | Saif Al-Dera |
| 77 | MF | JOR | Ahmed Waleed |
| 79 | FW | NGR | Victor Nwaneri |
| 87 | DF | UAE | Ibrahim Moosa |
| 90 | GK | UAE | Omar Al-Zaabi |
| 99 | FW | UAE | Jamal Maroof |
| — | GK | UAE | Ali Saeed Saqer |
| — | GK | UAE | Ahmed Al-Yadea |
| — | DF | UAE | Hamad Jassim |
| — | MF | ERI | Kamal Taha |
| — | MF | UAE | Mohanad Khamis |
| — | MF | UAE | Fahad Hadeed |
| — | FW | UAE | Nahyan Al-Shehhi |

== See also ==
- List of football clubs in the United Arab Emirates
