= Ahmed Haboush =

Emirati footballer (born 1991)

Personal information
- Full name: Ahmed Saleh Haboush Al-Nofali
- Date of birth: 24 December 1991 (age 34)
- Place of birth: United Arab Emirates
- Height: 1.76 m (5 ft 9 1/2 in)
- Position: Midfielder

Youth career
- Baniyas

Senior career*
Years	Team	Apps	(Gls)
2011–2019	Baniyas	54	(0)
2019	→ Dibba (loan)	12	(1)
2019–2020	Khor Fakkan	16	(0)
2021–2022	Al Urooba	16	(0)
2023	Al Jazirah Al-Hamra		
- * Club domestic league appearances and goals

Ahmed Saleh Haboush (Arabic:أحمد صالح حبوش) (born 24 December 1991) is an Emirati footballer who plays as a midfielder.
