= Jang Yun-ho (footballer) =

South Korean footballer (born 1996)

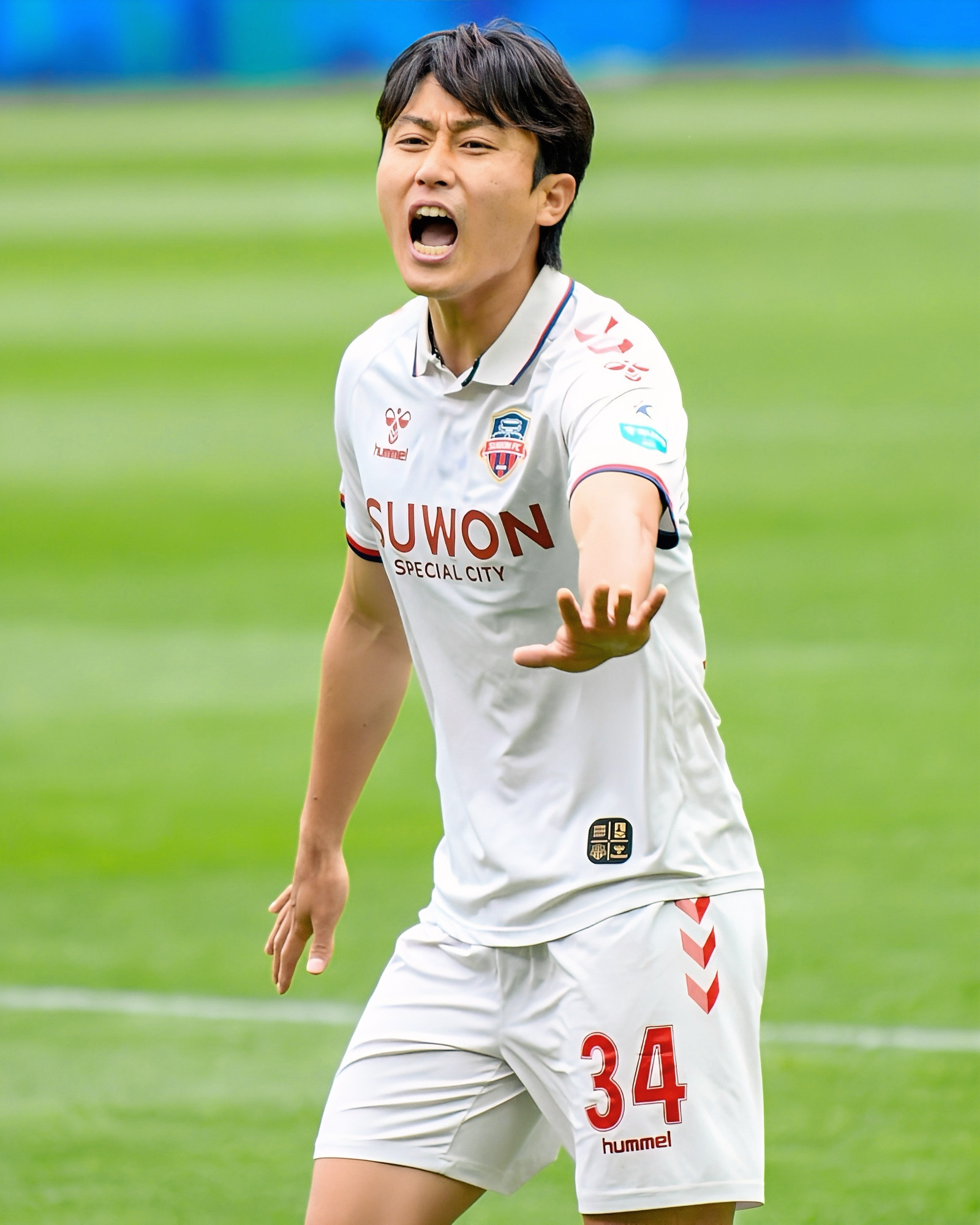
- Jang in 2025

Personal information
- Full name: Jang Yun-ho
- Date of birth: 25 August 1996 (age 30)
- Place of birth: South Korea
- Height: 1.78 m (5 ft 10 in)
- Position: Defensive midfielder

Team information
- Current team: Suwon FC
- Number: 34

Youth career
- 2012–2014: Jeonbuk Hyundai Motors

Senior career*
Years	Team	Apps	(Gls)
2015–2022	Jeonbuk Hyundai Motors	52	(4)
2019	→ Incheon United (loan)	14	(0)
2020-2021	→ Seoul E-Land FC (loan)	43	(1)
2023–2024	Gimpo FC	51	(4)
2025–	Suwon FC	8	(0)

International career^{‡}
2018–	South Korea U-23	11	(0)
2018–	South Korea	0	(0)
Medal record
Representing South Korea
Men's football
Asian Games
Gold medal – first place	2018 Jakarta-Palembang	Team
Korean name
Hangul	장윤호
Hanja	張潤鎬
RR	Jang Yunho
MR	Chang Yunho
- * Club domestic league appearances and goals as of 5 January 2026 ‡ National team caps and goals as of 4 December 2018

Jang Yun-ho (Korean: 장윤호; Hanja: 張潤鎬; born 25 August 1996) is a South Korean footballer who plays as a defensive midfielder for Suwon FC in K League 1.

== Career ==
Jang joined Jeonbuk Hyundai in 2015 and made his professional debut in a league match against Ulsan Hyundai on 17 June. He won the gold medal with the South Korea U-23 national team at the 2018 Asian Games.

== Career statistics ==
=== Club ===
As of 10 February 2022

Appearances and goals by club, season and competition
Club	Season	League			Cup		Continental		Total	
Club	Season	Division	Apps	Goals	Apps	Goals	Apps	Goals	Apps	Goals
Jeonbuk Hyundai Motors	2015	K League 1	10	2	1	0	0	0	11	2
Jeonbuk Hyundai Motors	2016	K League 1	11	1	3	0	7	0	21	1
Jeonbuk Hyundai Motors	2017	K League 1	17	1	0	0	–		17	1
Jeonbuk Hyundai Motors	2018	K League 1	12	0	0	0	1	0	13	0
Jeonbuk Hyundai Motors	2019	K League 1	2	0	0	0	0	0	2	0
Incheon United (loan)	2019	K League 1	14	0	0	0	0	0	14	0
Seoul E-Land FC	2020	K League 2	19	0	1	0	–		20	0
Seoul E-Land FC	2021	K League 2	24	1	1	0	–		25	1
Total			109	5	6	0	8	0	115	5

== Honours ==
=== Club ===
Jeonbuk Hyundai Motors

- K League 1 (3) : 2015, 2017, 2018
- AFC Champions League (1) : 2016

=== International ===
South Korea U23

- Asian Games: 2018
