= Ju-jitsu at the 2018 Asian Games – Men's 77 kg =

Men's jiu-jitsu 77 kg at the 2018 Asian Games
- Venue: Jakarta Convention Center
- Dates: 26 August 2018
- Competitors: 33 from 21 nations

Medalists
gold medal	Ruslan Israilov	Kazakhstan
bronze medal	Mohamed Al-Qubaisi	United Arab Emirates
bronze medal	Abdelkarim Al-Rasheed	Jordan

The men's jiu-jitsu (ne-waza) 77 kilograms Ju-jitsu competition at the 2018 Asian Games in Jakarta was held on 26 August 2018 at the Jakarta Convention Center Assembly Hall. Ju-jitsu made its debut at the 2018 Asian Games. Earlier, it was incorporated into the 2017 Asian Indoor and Martial Arts Games.

== Schedule ==
All times are Western Indonesia Time (UTC+07:00)

Date	Time	Event
Sunday, 26 August 2018	10:00	1/32 finals
Sunday, 26 August 2018	10:00	1/16 finals
Sunday, 26 August 2018	10:00	1/8 finals
Sunday, 26 August 2018	10:00	1/4 finals
Sunday, 26 August 2018	10:00	Final of repechage
Sunday, 26 August 2018	10:00	Final of tables
Sunday, 26 August 2018	16:00	Finals

== Results ==
Legend

- DQ — Won by disqualification
- SU — Won by submission (100–0)

=== Main bracket ===
==== Finals ====
Final of tables		Final
Nursultan Alymkulov (KGZ)	2
Abdelkarim Al-Rasheed (JOR)	0	Nursultan Alymkulov (KGZ)	0
Batkhuyagiin Erkhbayar (MGL)	0	Ruslan Israilov (KAZ)	2
Ruslan Israilov (KAZ)	6

==== Top half ====
===== Section 1 =====
1/32 finals
Muhammad Mumtaz (PAK)	3
Mohammed Abdalhafiz (PLE)	0

1/16 finals
Muhammad Mumtaz (PAK)	0
Nursultan Alymkulov (KGZ)	13^{SU}
Mirali Sharipov (UZB)	2
Olzhas Nurtakanov (KAZ)	0
Abdul Hamid Mehrdil (AFG)	0
Mohamed Al-Qubaisi (UAE)	8
Abdalsalam Haj Kadour (SYR)	0
Reyhan Benatar Algadri (INA)	0^{SU}

1/8 finals
Nursultan Alymkulov (KGZ)	16
Mirali Sharipov (UZB)	0
Mohamed Al-Qubaisi (UAE)	4
Reyhan Benatar Algadri (INA)	0

1/4 finals
Nursultan Alymkulov (KGZ)	2
Mohamed Al-Qubaisi (UAE)	2

===== Section 2 =====
1/32 finals

1/16 finals
Allamyrat Garaýew (TKM)	2^{DQ}
Ahmed Ayash (YEM)	0
Tömörtogoogiin Mönkh (MGL)	5
Rachata Ngamyoo (THA)	0
Abdelkarim Al-Rasheed (JOR)	2
Lee Tien-yu (TPE)	0
Abdulrahman Farman (KUW)	0
Hamid Amraei (IRI)	3^{DQ}

1/8 finals
Allamyrat Garaýew (TKM)	0
Tömörtogoogiin Mönkh (MGL)	0
Abdelkarim Al-Rasheed (JOR)	2
Hamid Amraei (IRI)	0

1/4 finals
Tömörtogoogiin Mönkh (MGL)	0
Abdelkarim Al-Rasheed (JOR)	2

==== Bottom half ====
===== Section 3 =====
1/16 finals

1/8 finals
Adrian Guggenheim (PHI)	4
Sooknatee Suntra (THA)	0
Abdumanon Rahimov (TJK)	0
Saoud Al-Hammadi (UAE)	2
Nijad Al-Qosaibi (BRN)	0^{SU}
Abdul Rehman (PAK)	0
Batkhuyagiin Erkhbayar (MGL)	4
Ulugbek Otamurodov (UZB)	2

1/4 finals
Adrian Guggenheim (PHI)	0
Saoud Al-Hammadi (UAE)	2
Nijad Al-Qosaibi (BRN)	0
Batkhuyagiin Erkhbayar (MGL)	0^{SU}

Final of tables
Saoud Al-Hammadi (UAE)	0
Batkhuyagiin Erkhbayar (MGL)	2

===== Section 4 =====
1/16 finals

1/8 finals
Rahmet Taganow (TKM)	0
Aiazbek Mustakov (KGZ)	0
Willy (INA)	3
Quek Kon Hui (SGP)	0
Mohanad Sham (SYR)	0
Hamzeh Al-Rasheed (JOR)	9^{SU}
Ruslan Israilov (KAZ)	0^{SU}
Mohammad Mansouri Davar (IRI)	0

1/4 finals
Aiazbek Mustakov (KGZ)	0^{SU}
Willy (INA)	0
Hamzeh Al-Rasheed (JOR)	0
Ruslan Israilov (KAZ)	0

Final of tables
Aiazbek Mustakov (KGZ)	0
Ruslan Israilov (KAZ)	4

=== Repechage ===
Final of repechage
Mohamed Al-Qubaisi (UAE)	4
Tömörtogoogiin Mönkh (MGL)	0
Saoud Al-Hammadi (UAE)	4
Aiazbek Mustakov (KGZ)	0

Bronze medals
Mohamed Al-Qubaisi (UAE)	0
Batkhuyagiin Erkhbayar (MGL)	0
Saoud Al-Hammadi (UAE)	0
Abdelkarim Al-Rasheed (JOR)	0

- Nursultan Alymkulov of Kyrgyzstan originally won the silver medal, but was disqualified after he tested positive for Metandienone and GW501516.
