= Victor Nwaneri =

Nigerian footballer

Personal information
- Date of birth: 17 February 1993 (age 33)
- Position: Forward

Team information
- Current team: Al Jazirah Al-Hamra
- Number: 79

Senior career*
Years	Team	Apps	(Gls)
2015–2016	Al Nisr	18	(28)
2016–2018	Qalali		
2019–2022	Hatta		
2020	→ Masfout (loan)		
2020–2021	→ Al Urooba (loan)		
2022–2022	Al-Hamriyah		
2023–2024	Al Urooba		
2024–2025	Al Arabi		
2025–2026	Dubai City		
2026–	Al Jazirah Al-Hamra		
- * Club domestic league appearances and goals as of 22:15, 1 February 2020 (UTC)

Victor Nwaneri (born 17 February 1993) is a Nigerian footballer who currently plays as a forward for UAE First Division League club Al Jazirah Al-Hamra.

== Career statistics ==
=== Club ===
As of 1 February 2020.

Club	Season	League			Cup		Continental		Other		Total	
Club	Season	Division	Apps	Goals	Apps	Goals	Apps	Goals	Apps	Goals	Apps	Goals
Al Nisr	2015–16	Dubai Amateur Football League	18	28	0	0	–		0	0	18	28
Hatta	2019–20	UAE Pro League	2	0	2 (Note: Appearances in the UAE League Cup)	0	0	0	0	0	4	0
Career total			20	28	2	0	0	0	0	0	22	28
