= Ali Saeed Saqer =

Emirati footballer (born 1989)

Personal information
- Full name: Ali Saeed Saqer Al-Shehi
- Date of birth: 30 June 1989 (age 37)
- Place of birth: Dubai, United Arab Emirates
- Height: 1.81 m (5 ft 11 1/2 in)
- Position: Goalkeeper

Team information
- Current team: Emirates
- Number: 13

Youth career
- 2003–2010: Ras Al Khaima

Senior career*
Years	Team	Apps	(Gls)
2010–2011	Ras Al Khaima		
2011–2022	Emirates		
2022–2023	Dibba Al Fujairah		
2023–2024	Al Taawon		
2024–2025	Dubai United		
2025–	Emirates		
- * Club domestic league appearances and goals

Ali Saeed Saqer (Arabic: علي سعيد صقر; born 30 June 1989) is an Emirati footballer. He currently plays as a goalkeeper for Emirates.

Whilst playing for Emirates Club in September 2016, Saqer received negative attention after he was issued a straight red card in a 5–2 loss to Al Ain for punching Danilo Asprilla and then stomping on the Colombian winger's head while he lay on the ground.
