= Yūgo Tatsuta =

Japanese footballer

Yūgo Tatsuta 立田 悠悟
Personal information
- Full name: Yūgo Tatsuta
- Date of birth: 21 June 1998 (age 28)
- Place of birth: Shimizu-ku, Shizuoka, Japan
- Height: 1.90 m (6 ft 3 in)
- Position: Centre back

Team information
- Current team: Fagiano Okayama
- Number: 2

Youth career
- Irie SSS
- Shimizu Club SS
- 2010–2016: Shimizu S-Pulse

Senior career*
Years	Team	Apps	(Gls)
2017–2022	Shimizu S-Pulse	150	(3)
2023–2024	Kashiwa Reysol	34	(0)
2025–	Fagiano Okayama	49	(0)

International career^{‡}
2017	Japan U19	3	(0)
2018–	Japan U23	9	(0)
2019–	Japan	1	(0)
Medal record
Representing Japan
Asian Games
Silver medal – second place	2018 Jakarta-Palembang	Team
- * Club domestic league appearances and goals as of 12 August 2026 ‡ National team caps and goals as of 2 July 2019

Yūgo Tatsuta (立田 悠悟, Tatsuta Yūgo; born 21 June 1998) is a Japanese footballer who plays as a centre back for J1 League club Fagiano Okayama and the Japan national football team.

Tatsuta has played over 160 J1 League games in his career, and has played for the national team at varying levels.

== Club career ==
On 25 October 2016, it was announced that Tatsuta would join the Shimizu S-Pulse first team from the 2017 season. On 15 March 2017, he made his professional debut in the J.League Cup against Kashiwa Reysol. Tatsuta made his league debut against Kashima Antlers on 25 February 2018, playing the full 90 minutes in an unfamiliar position at right back. During the second gameweek, he scored his first professional goal, scoring against Vissel Kobe in the 72nd minute on 3 March 2018. He continued to be selected in the starting lineup, being selected in the starting line-up for the first five games of the 2018 season.

On 30 November 2022, Tatsuta was announced at Kashiwa Reysol on a permanent transfer. He made his league debut against Gamba Osaka on 18 February 2023.

On 27 December 2024, Tatsuta was announced at Fagiano Okayama on a permanent transfer.

== International career ==
On 3 August 2018, Tatsuta was called up to the Japan squad for the 2018 Asian Games. The Asian edition of Fox Sports selected the best XI from the tournament, and he was selected in the XI.

On May 24, 2019, Tatsuta was called up by Japan's head coach Hajime Moriyasu to feature in the Copa América, played in Brazil. He made his debut on 20 June 2019 against Uruguay, as an 87th-minute substitute for Tomoki Iwata.

== Club statistics ==
As of 6 March 2023.

Appearances and goals by club, season and competition
Club	Season	League			National Cup		League Cup		Total	
Club	Season	Division	Apps	Goals	Apps	Goals	Apps	Goals	Apps	Goals
Japan			League		Emperor's Cup		J. League Cup		Total	
Shimizu S-Pulse	2017	J1 League	0	0	0	0	3	0	3	0
Shimizu S-Pulse	2018	J1 League	25	1	2	0	2	0	29	1
Shimizu S-Pulse	2019	J1 League	26	0	4	0	4	0	34	0
Shimizu S-Pulse	2019	J1 League	26	0	4	0	4	0	34	0
Shimizu S-Pulse	2020	J1 League	29	2	0	0	1	0	30	2
Shimizu S-Pulse	2021	J1 League	18	0	3	0	0	0	21	0
Shimizu S-Pulse	2022	J1 League	26	0	2	0	4	0	32	0
Shimizu S-Pulse	Total		150	3	15	0	18	0	183	3
Kashiwa Reysol	2023	J1 League	3	0	0	0	0	0	3	0
Career total			153	3	15	0	18	0	186	3

== National team statistics ==
Japan national team
Year	Apps	Goals
2019	1	0
Total	1	0
