= Abdullah Al-Noubi (footballer, born 1995) =

Emirati footballer

Personal information
- Full name: Abdullah Hassan Khalfan Al-Noubi
- Date of birth: 18 March 1995 (age 31)
- Place of birth: United Arab Emirates
- Height: 1.78 m (5 ft 10 in)
- Position: Defender

Team information
- Current team: Al Jazirah Al-Hamra
- Number: 2

Youth career
- Al-Ahli

Senior career*
Years	Team	Apps	(Gls)
2015–2017	Al-Ahli	0	(0)
2017	→ Hatta (loan)	4	(0)
2017–2018	Hatta	12	(0)
2018–2021	Al-Fujairah	35	(2)
2021–2022	Khor Fakkan	0	(0)
2022–2023	Al-Arabi		
2023–2024	Al-Hamriyah		
2024–2025	Al Arabi		
2025–	Al Jazirah Al-Hamra		
- * Club domestic league appearances and goals

Abdullah Hassan Al-Noubi (Arabic:عبد الله حسن النوبي) (born 18 March 1995) is an Emirati footballer. He currently plays for Al Jazirah Al-Hamra as a defender.
