= Hamad Jassim =

Emirati association football player (born 1996)

Hamad Jassim حمد جاسم
Personal information
- Full name: Hamad Jassim Hassan Al-Jasmi
- Date of birth: 22 June 1996 (age 30)
- Place of birth: Emirates
- Height: 1.81 m (5 ft 11 in)
- Position: Defender

Team information
- Current team: Al-Arabi

Youth career
- 2009–2017: Al-Sharjah

Senior career*
Years	Team	Apps	(Gls)
2017–2023	Al-Sharjah	31	(0)
2022	→ Al Urooba (loan)	0	(0)
2022–2023	→ Al Bataeh (loan)	13	(0)
2023–2026	Al-Hamriyah		
2026–	Al-Arabi		
- * Club domestic league appearances and goals

Hamad Jassim (Arabic:حمد جاسم) (born 22 June 1996) is an Emirati footballer. He currently plays as a defender for Al-Arabi.

== Career ==
Hamad Jassim started his career at Al-Sharjah and is a product of the Al-Sharjah's youth system. On 3 May 2017, Hamad Jassim made his professional debut for Al-Sharjah against Al-Ain in the Pro League.

He was playing with Al-Sharjah and after merging Al-Sharjah, and Al-Shaab clubs under the name Al-Sharjah he was joined to Al-Sharjah. On 2 February 2018, Hamad Jassim made his professional debut for Al-Sharjah against Hatta in the Pro League .
