= Kim Yu-song =

North Korean footballer (born 1995)

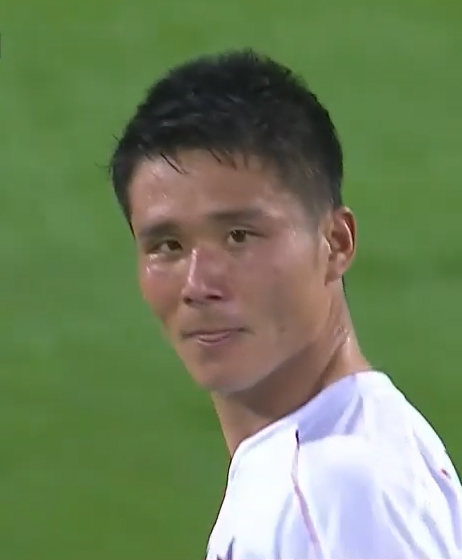
- Yu-song in 2019

Personal information
- Date of birth: 24 January 1995 (age 31)
- Place of birth: Wonsan, North Korea
- Height: 1.80 m (5 ft 11 in)
- Position: Forward

Team information
- Current team: April 25
- Number: 18

Senior career*
Years	Team	Apps	(Gls)
–2014	April 25		
2014–2015	Zürich II	21	(9)
2015–	April 25		

International career^{‡}
2014	North Korea U19	6	(2)
2015	North Korea U20	3	(0)
2017–2018	North Korea U23	12	(9)
2016–2018	North Korea	18	(8)
- * Club domestic league appearances and goals as of 21:03, 14 June 2017 (UTC) ‡ National team caps and goals as of 8 October 2024

- Kim Yu-song
- Hangul: 김유성
- RR: Gim Yuseong
- MR: Kim Yusŏng

Kim Yu-song (Korean: 김유성; born 24 January 1995) is a North Korean professional footballer who plays as a forward for April 25 in the DPR Korea League.

== Club career ==
Kim played briefly in Europe for the reserve side of Zürich, where he scored nine goals in twenty-one appearances.

During the 2017 AFC Cup, Kim made headlines for scoring five goals in a 6–0 victory over Mongolian side Erchim FC, winning the Fans' Asian Player of Matchday 3. He finished the competition as top scorer, with nine goals in six appearances.

== International career ==
Kim made his senior international debut in a 5–2 away loss to Vietnam, replacing Kim Kuk-Bom after 73 minutes. He scored his first goal for his nation on 6 June 2017; the equaliser in a 2–2 draw with Qatar, before scoring another equaliser a week later, this time against Hong Kong.

During his career with the North Korea national team, he was often cited as a "player to watch", however it is unclear what happened to Kim after 2018.

== Career statistics ==
=== International ===
As of matches played 13 November 2017.

National team	Year	Apps	Goals
North Korea	2016	4	0
North Korea	2017	9	7
North Korea	2018	5	1
Total		18	8

=== International goals ===
Scores and results list North Korea's goal tally first.

No	Date	Venue	Opponent	Score	Result	Competition
1.	6 June 2017	Jassim Bin Hamad Stadium, Doha, Qatar	Qatar	2–2	2–2	Friendly
2.	13 June 2017	Hong Kong Stadium, Mong Kok, Hong Kong	Hong Kong	1–1	1–1	2019 AFC Asian Cup qualification
3.	5 September 2017	Kim Il Sung Stadium, Pyongyang, North Korea	Lebanon	1–0	2–2	2019 AFC Asian Cup qualification
4.	10 November 2017	New I-Mobile Stadium, Buriram, Thailand	Malaysia	2–0	4–1	2019 AFC Asian Cup qualification
5.	13 November 2017	New I-Mobile Stadium, Buriram, Thailand	Malaysia	1–0	4–1	2019 AFC Asian Cup qualification
6.	13 November 2017	New I-Mobile Stadium, Buriram, Thailand	Malaysia	2–0	4–1	2019 AFC Asian Cup qualification
7.	13 November 2017	New I-Mobile Stadium, Buriram, Thailand	Malaysia	3–0	4–1	2019 AFC Asian Cup qualification
8.	11 November 2018	Taipei Municipal Stadium, Taipei, Taiwan	Mongolia	2–0	4–1	2019 EAFF E-1 Football Championship qualification
