= Wibawa Mukti Stadium =

Multi-purpose stadium in West Java, Indonesia

- Stadion Wibawa Mukti
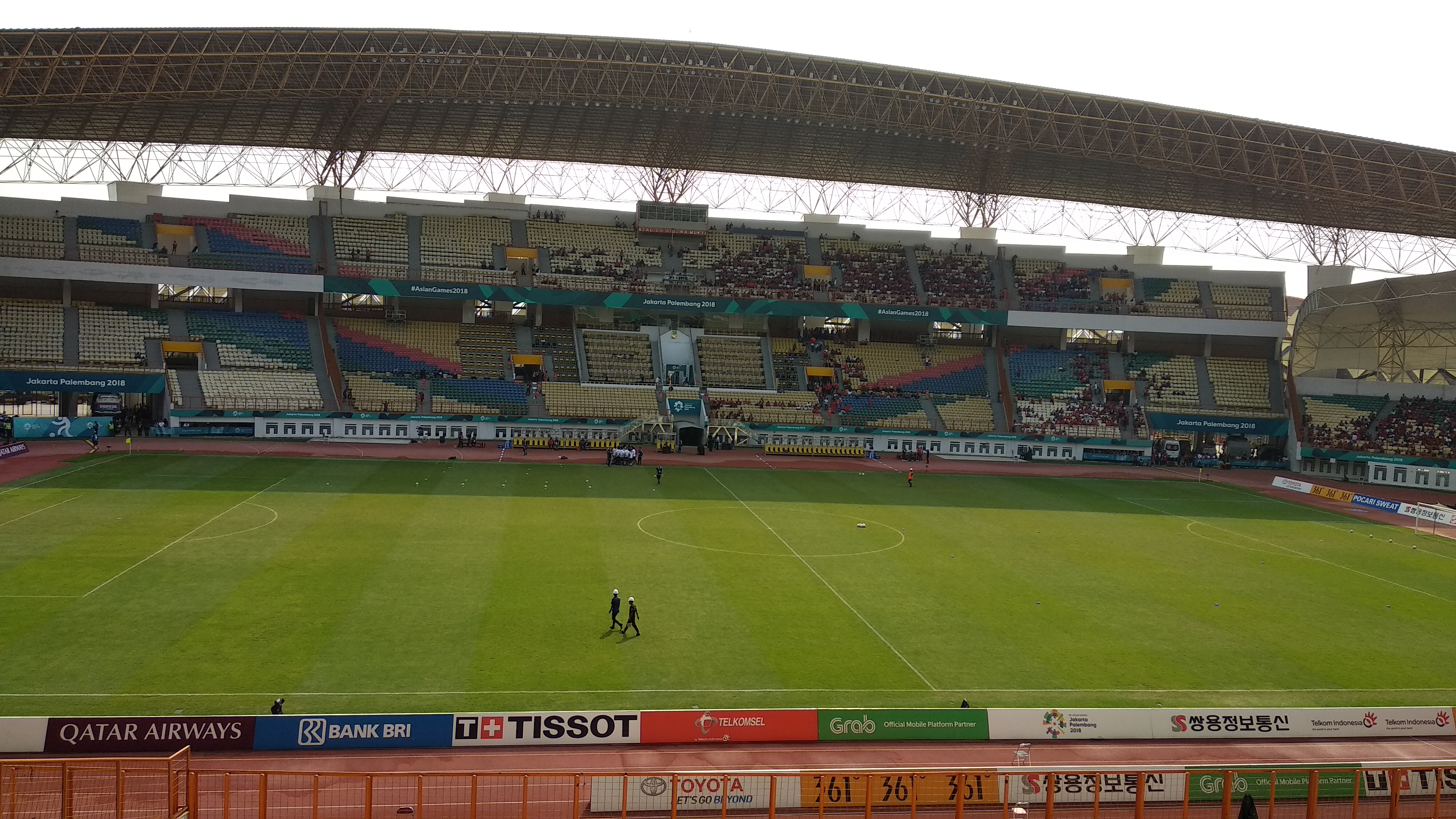
- Interactive map of Wibawa Mukti Stadium
- Address: Jl. Stadion Wibawa Mukti, Sertajaya, East Cikarang; Bekasi Regency, West Java; Indonesia
- Coordinates: 6°18′41″S 107°10′55″E
- Owner: Government of Bekasi Regency
- Operator: Government of Bekasi Regency
- Capacity: 30,000

Construction
- Opened: 2014

Tenants
- Adhyaksa F.C. Persikasi Bekasi; Persitara North Jakarta

Wibawa Mukti Stadium (Indonesian: Stadion Wibawa Mukti) is a multi-purpose stadium located in Cikarang, Bekasi Regency, West Java, Indonesia. It is currently used mostly for football matches.

== Sports event ==
The stadium was built to host the 2014 Porda Jabar XII in Bekasi Regency and used as a venue for the 2016 PON XIX (19th Indonesian National Sports Week). The stadium is one of the venues for men's football of 2018 Asian Games. It is currently the homeground for the Persikasi Bekasi club.

The stadium can accommodate 28,778 people with all-seater configuration. This stadium also has excellent transportation access, one of which is close to the Cibatu toll gate on KM 34.7 of Jakarta–Cikampek Toll Road.

== International matches hosted ==
Date	Competition	Team 1	Result	Team 2	Crowd
18 Nov 2017	International Friendly	Indonesia	0–1	Syria U-23	N/A
11 Sep 2018	International Friendly	Indonesia	1–0	Mauritius	12,621
10 Oct 2018	International Friendly	Indonesia	3–0	Myanmar	4,217
16 Oct 2018	International Friendly	Indonesia	1–1	Hong Kong	N/A

=== Football tournaments hosted ===
- 2018 Asian Games Men's Football

== Gallery ==
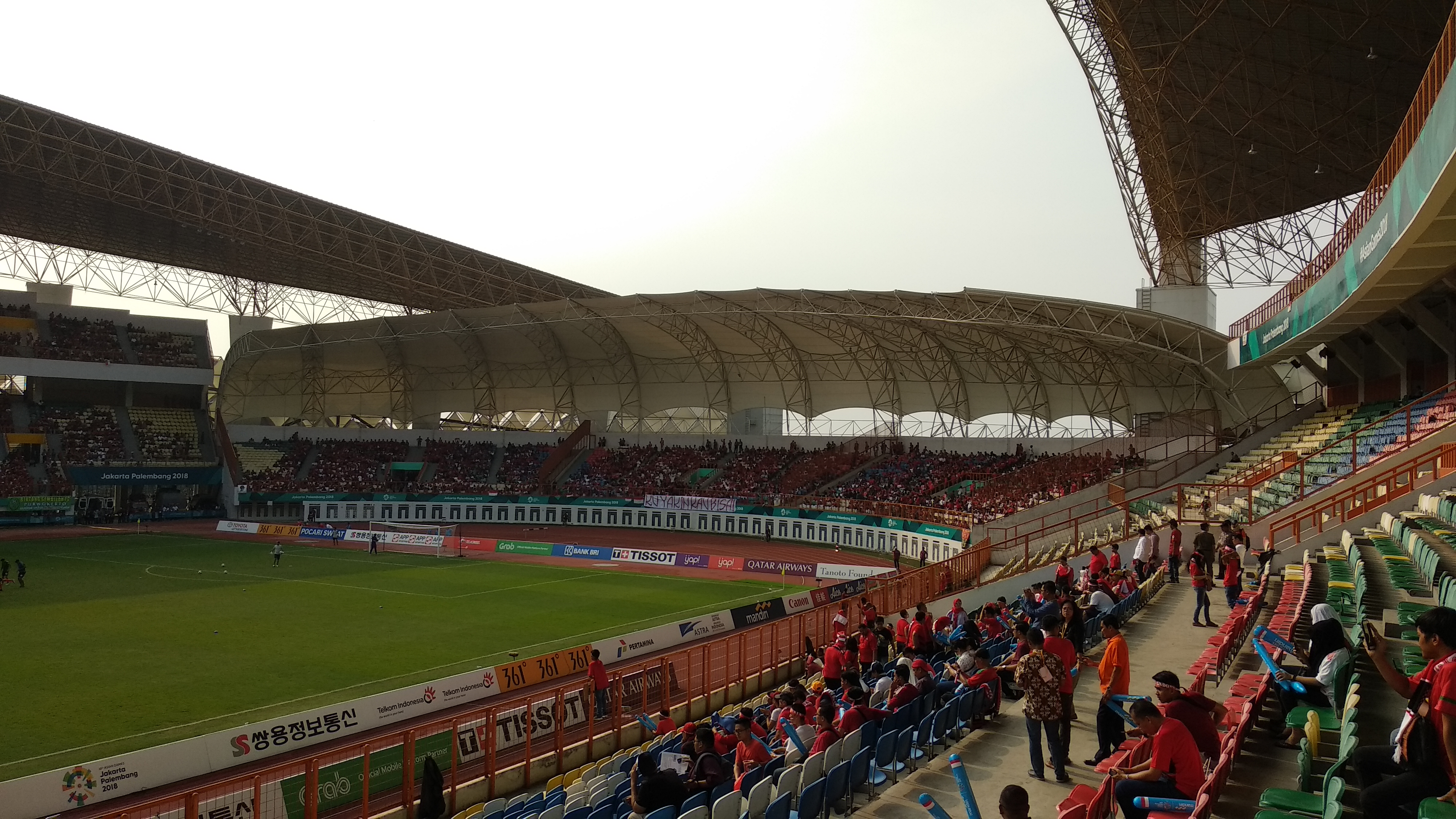

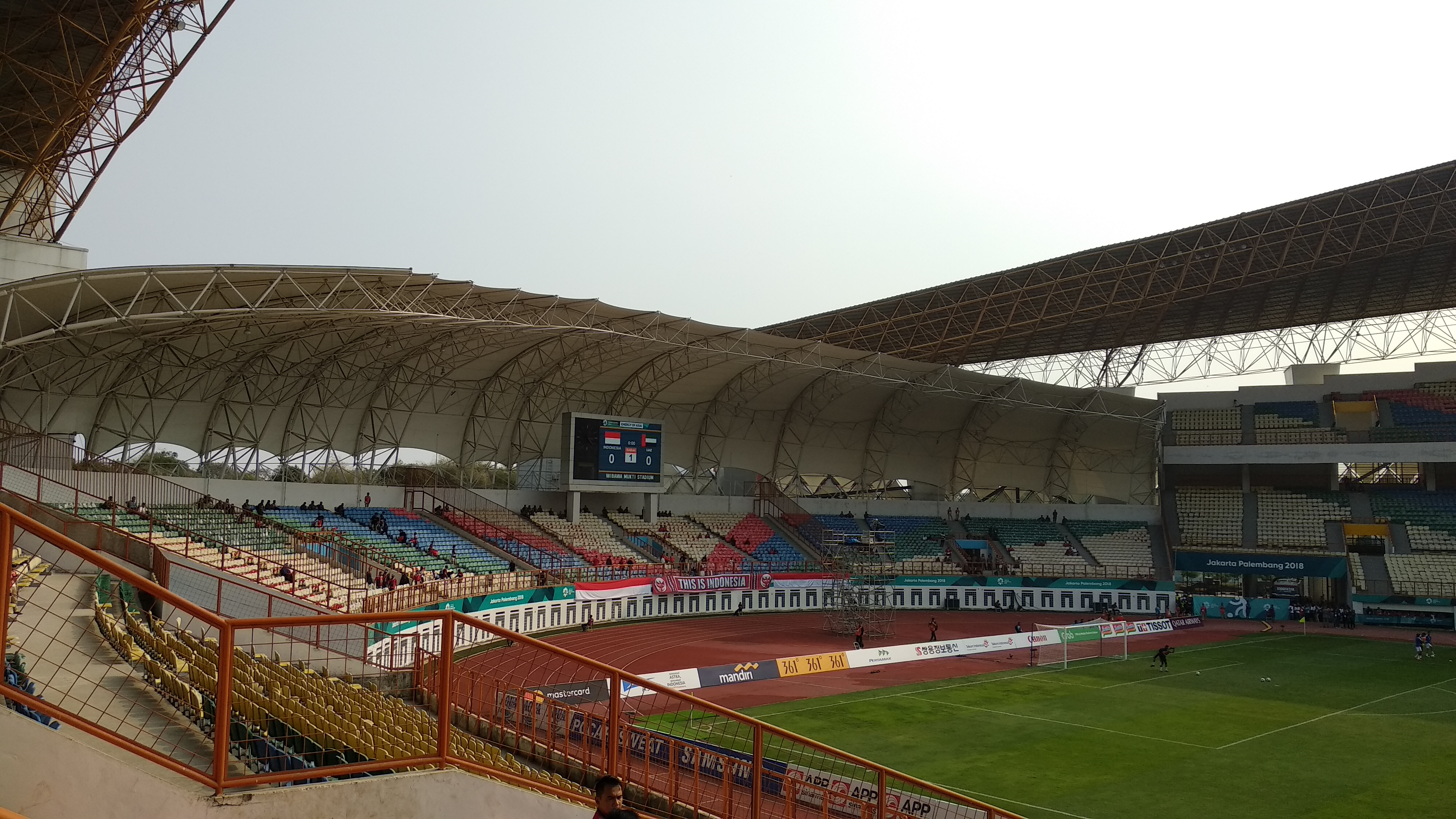

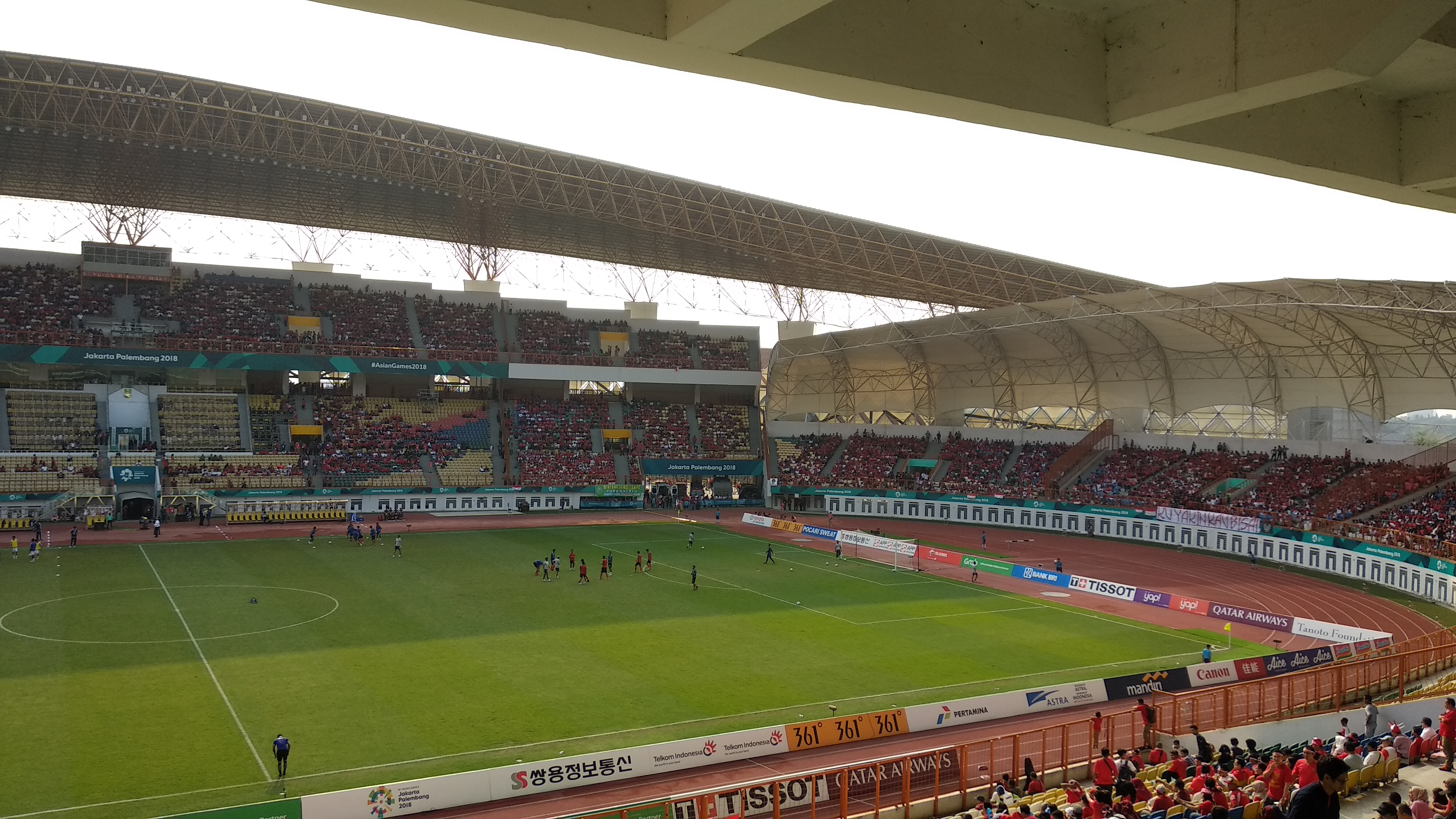

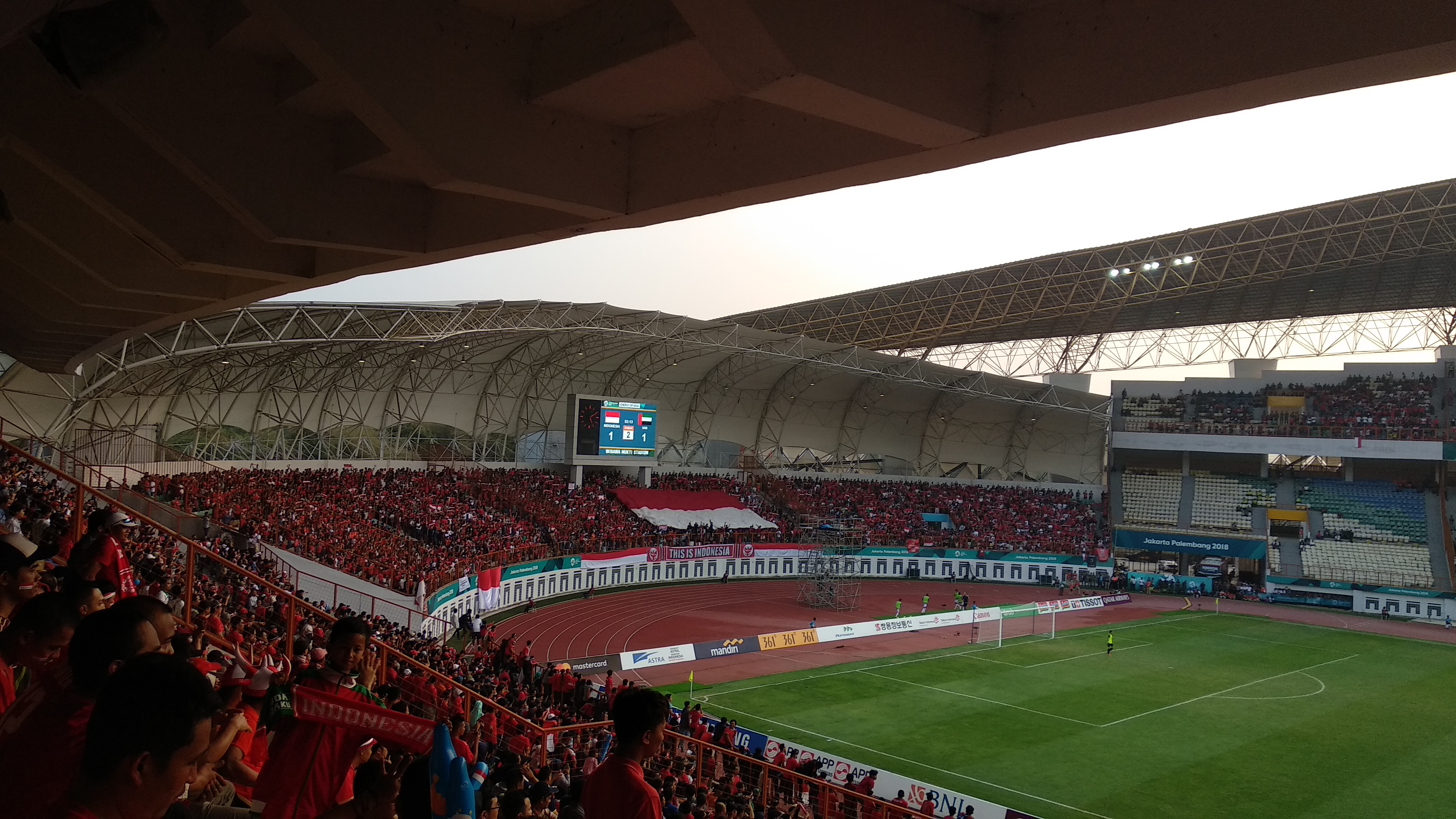
