= Mohamed Al-Shamsi =

Emirati footballer (born 1997)

Personal information
- Full name: Mohamed Hasan Khalifa Mohamed Al-Shamsi
- Date of birth: 4 January 1997 (age 29)
- Place of birth: Sharjah, United Arab Emirates
- Height: 1.85 m (6 ft 1 in)
- Position: Goalkeeper

Team information
- Current team: Al-Wahda
- Number: 1

Youth career
- –2016: Al-Wahda

Senior career*
Years	Team	Apps	(Gls)
2016–	Al Wahda	155	(0)

International career^{‡}
2013	United Arab Emirates U17	3	(0)
2016	United Arab Emirates U19	3	(0)
2018–2020	United Arab Emirates U23	11	(0)
2017–2022	United Arab Emirates	7	(0)
- * Club domestic league appearances and goals as of 16 March 2026 ‡ National team caps and goals as of 27 September 2022

Mohamed Hasan Khalifa Mohamed Al-Shamsi (Arabic: مُحَمَّد حَسَن خَلِيْفَة مُحَمَّد الشَّامسِيّ; born 4 January 1997) is an Emirati footballer who plays as a goalkeeper for Al-Wahda.

== Career ==
Al Shamsi made his professional debut in the UAE Pro-League for Al-Wahda on 16 September 2017, starting in the away match against Dibba Al-Fujairah, which finished as a 5–0 win.

Al Shamsi was included in United Arab Emirates's squad for the 2019 AFC Asian Cup in the United Arab Emirates.

== Career statistics ==
=== Club ===
As of match played 17 January 2026

Appearances and goals by club, season and competition
Club	Season	League			Cup		League cup		Continental		Other		Total	
Club	Season	Division	Apps	Goals	Apps	Goals	Apps	Goals	Apps	Goals	Apps	Goals	Apps	Goals
Al Wahda	2016–17	UAE Pro League	0	0	0	0	0	0	0	0	—		0	0
Al Wahda	2017–18	UAE Pro League	21	0	3	0	4	0	4	0	1	0	33	0
Al Wahda	2018–19	UAE Pro League	20	0	0	0	1	0	5	0	0	0	26	0
Al Wahda	2019–20	UAE Pro League	16	0	1	0	1	0	4	0	—		22	0
Al Wahda	2020–21	UAE Pro League	19	0	1	0	0	0	6	0	—		26	0
Al Wahda	2021–22	UAE Pro League	22	0	5	0	1	0	2	0	—		30	0
Al Wahda	2022–23	UAE Pro League	22	0	0	0	1	0	—		—		23	0
Al Wahda	2023–24	UAE Pro League	9	0	0	0	1	0	—		—		10	0
Al Wahda	2024–25	UAE Pro League	16	0	1	0	2	0	—		—		19	0
Al Wahda	2025–26	UAE Pro League	10	0	1	0	2	0	5	0	—		18	0
Career total			155	0	12	0	13	0	26	0	1	0	207	0

=== International ===
As of match played 27 September 2022

Appearances and goals by national team and year
National team	Year	Apps	Goals
United Arab Emirates	2017	1	0
United Arab Emirates	2018	0	0
United Arab Emirates	2019	3	0
United Arab Emirates	2021	1	0
United Arab Emirates	2022	2	0
Total		7	0
