= Ahmed Al-Attas =

Emirati footballer (born 1995)

Ahmed Al Attas
Personal information
- Full name: Ahmed Mohamed Ahmed Husain Al Attas Al Hashmi
- Date of birth: 28 September 1995 (age 31)
- Place of birth: Abu Dhabi, United Arab Emirates
- Height: 1.78 m (5 ft 10 in)
- Position: Striker

Team information
- Current team: Al Dhafra
- Number: 9

Senior career*
Years	Team	Apps	(Gls)
2013–2018	Al Jazira	40	(13)
2018–2021	Shabab Al-Ahli	17	(2)
2020	→ Al Nasr (loan)	4	(0)
2021–2022	Sharjah	10	(0)
2022–2024	Al Jazira	12	(3)
2024–	Al Dhafra	0	(0)

International career^{‡}
2014–2018	United Arab Emirates U23	10	(2)
2015–	United Arab Emirates	11	(1)
- * Club domestic league appearances and goals ‡ National team caps and goals as of 16:10, 27 January 2018 (UTC)

Ahmed Al Attas (born 28 September 1995) is an Emirati professional footballer who plays as a striker for Al Dhafra.

== International career ==
=== International goals ===
Scores and results list United Arab Emirates' goal tally first.

Goal	Date	Venue	Opponent	Score	Result	Competition
1.	12 November 2015	Zayed Sports City Stadium, Abu Dhabi, United Arab Emirates	Timor-Leste	8–0	8–0	2018 FIFA World Cup qualification
