= Rashed Mohammed =

Emirati footballer (born 1995)

Personal information
- Full name: Rashed Mohammed Omar Musabbah
- Date of birth: 6 December 1995 (age 30)
- Place of birth: United Arab Emirates
- Height: 1.70 m (5 ft 7 in)
- Position: Full back

Team information
- Current team: Dibba
- Number: 70

Youth career
- Al Nasr

Senior career*
| Years | Team | Apps | (Gls) |
| 2014–2025 | Al Nasr | 128 | (3) |
| 2025– | Dibba | 0 | (0) |
- * Club domestic league appearances and goals as of 17 March 2025

Rashed Mohammed Omar Musabbah (Arabic: راشد محمد; born 6 December 1995) is an Emirati footballer. He currently plays for Dibba as a full back.
