= Zayed Al-Ameri =

Emirati footballer (born 1997)

Personal information
- Full name: Zayed Abdulla Braik Saeed Al-Ameri
- Date of birth: 14 January 1997 (age 29)
- Place of birth: Abu Dhabi, United Arab Emirates
- Height: 1.76 m (5 ft 9 in)
- Position: Striker

Team information
- Current team: Al-Dhafra
- Number: 16

Youth career
- Al Jazira

Senior career*
Years	Team	Apps	(Gls)
2016–2025	Al Jazira	103	(13)
2025–	Al-Dhafra	2	(0)

International career
2016–2020	Under 23 UAE	11	(9)
2018–2024	United Arab Emirates	7	(0)
- * Club domestic league appearances and goals

Zayed Abdulla Al-Ameri (Arabic: زايد عبد الله بريك سعيد العامري; born 14 January 1997) is an Emirati professional footballer who plays as a striker for Al-Dhafra and the United Arab Emirates national team. On 3 February 2022, Zayed was the first player in a FIFA competition to have a goal disallowed due to offsides called by the semi automated offside VAR system.
