= Salem Sultan =

Emirati footballer (born 1993)

Personal information
- Full name: Salem Sultan Salem Saeed Al Sharji
- Date of birth: 9 May 1993 (age 33)
- Place of birth: Al Ain, United Arab Emirates
- Height: 1.82 m (6 ft 0 in)
- Position: Centre-back

Team information
- Current team: Al-Nasr
- Number: 2

Youth career
- Al Ain

Senior career*
Years	Team	Apps	(Gls)
2012–2013	Al Ain	0	(0)
2013–2019	Al-Wahda	55	(1)
2019–2025	Sharjah	66	(2)
2025–	Al-Nasr	0	(0)

International career^{‡}
2016–	United Arab Emirates	3	(0)
- * Club domestic league appearances and goals ‡ National team caps and goals as of 9 May 2017

Salem Sultan Salem Saeed Al Sharji (Arabic:سالم سلطان الشارجي; born 9 May 1993) is an Emirati professional footballer. He currently plays as a centre-back for Al-Nasr.

== Honours ==
Al Ain

- UAE Pro League: 2012–13
- UAE Super Cup: 2012

Al Wahda

- UAE President's Cup: 2016–17
- UAE League Cup: 2015–16, 2017–18
- UAE Super Cup: 2017, 2018

Sharjah

- UAE President's Cup: 2021–22, 2022–23
- UAE League Cup: 2022–23
- UAE Super Cup: 2019, 2022
- AFC Champions League Two: 2024–25
