= Khaled Ibrahim =

Emirati footballer (born 1997)

Khaled Ebraheim

Personal information
- Full name: Khaled Ebraheim Helal Ebraheim Al-Ghais Al-Dhanhani
- Date of birth: 17 January 1997 (age 29)
- Place of birth: Dibba Al Hisn, United Arab Emirates
- Height: 1.83 m (6 ft 0 in)
- Position: Right back

Team information
- Current team: Sharjah
- Number: 19

Youth career
- 2008–2016: Dibba Al-Fujairah

Senior career*
Years	Team	Apps	(Gls)
2016–2020	Al-Wahda	39	(0)
2019–2020	→ Baniyas (loan)	6	(0)
2020–	Sharjah	68	(2)

International career
2022–	United Arab Emirates	30	(1)
- * Club domestic league appearances and goals

Khaled Ebraheim Al-Dhanhani (Arabic: خَالِد إِبْرَاهِيم هِلَال الْغَيْص الظَّنْحَانِيّ; born 17 January 1997) is an Emirati footballer who plays as a right back for Sharjah and the United Arab Emirates national team.

== International career ==
On 4 January 2024, he was named in the UAE's squad for the 2023 AFC Asian Cup.

=== International goals ===
No.	Date	Venue	Opponent	Score	Result	Competition
1.	5 September 2024	Ahmad bin Ali Stadium, Al Rayyan, Qatar	Qatar	2–1	3–1	2026 FIFA World Cup qualification

== Honours ==
Al Wahda

- UAE President's Cup: 2016–17
- UAE League Cup: 2015–16, 2017–18
- UAE Super Cup: 2017, 2018

Sharjah

- UAE President's Cup: 2021–22, 2022–23
- UAE League Cup: 2022–23
- UAE Super Cup: 2022
- AFC Champions League Two: 2024–25

=== United Arab Emirates ===
- FIFA Arab Cup: Third place 2025
- Arabian Gulf Cup: Runners-up 2026
