= Shahin Suroor =

Emirati footballer (born 1996)

Personal information
- Full name: Shahin Suroor Al-Dermaqi
- Date of birth: 21 June 1996 (age 30)
- Place of birth: United Arab Emirates
- Height: 1.84 m (6 ft 1/2 in)
- Position: Attacking midfielder

Team information
- Current team: Al Orooba
- Number: 5

Youth career
- Al Jazira

Senior career*
Years	Team	Apps	(Gls)
2015–2019	Al Jazira	1	(0)
2016–2019	→ Ittihad Kalba (loan)	24	(1)
2019–2023	Baniyas	35	(0)
2023–2024	Khor Fakkan	8	(1)
2024–	Al Orooba	1	(0)
- * Club domestic league appearances and goals

Shahin Suroor (Arabic: شاهين سرور; born 21 June 1996) is an Emirati footballer. He currently plays for Al Orooba as an attacking midfielder.
