= 2018 in Malaysian football =

Football in Malaysia
- Season: 2018

Men's football
- Super League: Johor Darul Ta'zim
- Premier League: Felda United
- FAM League: Terengganu City
- FA Cup: Pahang
- Malaysia Cup: Perak TBG
- Challenge Cup: Terengganu II
- Community Shield: Johor Darul Ta'zim

The 2018 season of competitive association football in Malaysia.

== Promotion and relegation ==
=== Pre-season ===
League	Promoted to league	Relegated from league
Liga Super	Kuala Lumpur; Terengganu; PKNP; Negeri Sembilan	Felda United; Sarawak; Penang
Liga Premier	UKM; Felcra	ATM; Perlis

== New and withdrawn teams ==
=== New teams ===
- Terengganu II (Liga Premier)

=== Withdrawn teams ===
- (Kuala Lumpur) Sime Darby (Liga Premier)
- (Malacca) SAMB (Piala FAM)
- (Terengganu) T–Team (Liga Super)

== National team ==
Win Draw Lose

=== Malaysia national football team ===
==== 2019 AFC Asian Cup qualification – third round ====
Pos	Team	Pld	W	D	L	GF	GA	GD	Pts	Qualification	Lebanon	North Korea	Hong Kong	Malaysia
1	Lebanon	6	5	1	0	14	4	+10	16	2019 AFC Asian Cup	—	5–0	2–0	2–1
2	North Korea	6	3	2	1	13	10	+3	11	2019 AFC Asian Cup	2–2	—	2–0	4–1
3	Hong Kong	6	1	2	3	4	7	−3	5		0–1	1–1	—	2–0
4	Malaysia	6	0	1	5	5	15	−10	1		1–2	1–4	1–1	—

Source: AFC
Rules for classification: Qualification tiebreakers

27 March 2018	Lebanon	2–1	Malaysia	Camille Chamoun Sports City Stadium, Beirut
21:45 UTC+8	Maatouk 19' (pen.); El-Helwe 90+4'	Report	Syafiq 72'	Attendance: 3,500; Referee: Valentin Kovalenko (Uzbekistan)

==== 2018 AFF Championship ====
Pos	Team	Pld	W	D	L	GF	GA	GD	Pts	Qualification
1	Vietnam	4	3	1	0	8	0	+8	10	Knockout phase
2	Malaysia	4	3	0	1	7	3	+4	9	Knockout phase
3	Myanmar	4	2	1	1	7	5	+2	7	
4	Cambodia	4	1	0	3	4	9	−5	3	
5	Laos	4	0	0	4	3	12	−9	0	

Source: AFF

8 November 2018 Group stage	Cambodia	0–1	Malaysia	Phnom Penh, Cambodia
18:30 UTC+7		Report (AFFSZ); Report (AFF)	Norshahrul 30'	Stadium: Olympic Stadium; Attendance: 34,250; Referee: Ahmad A'qashah (Singapore)

12 November 2018 Group stage	Malaysia	3–1	Laos	Kuala Lumpur, Malaysia
20:45 UTC+8	Zaquan Adha 15'; Norshahrul 86', 90+2'	Report (AFFSZ); Report (AFF)	Kongmathilath 7'	Stadium: Bukit Jalil National Stadium; Attendance: 12,127; Referee: Sivakorn Pu-udom (Thailand)

16 November 2018 Group stage	Vietnam	2–0	Malaysia	Hanoi, Vietnam
19:30 UTC+7	Công Phượng 11'; Anh Đức 60'	Report (AFFSZ); Report (AFF)		Stadium: Mỹ Đình National Stadium; Attendance: 40,000; Referee: Turki Al-Khudayr (Saudi Arabia)

24 November 2018 Group stage	Malaysia	3–0	Myanmar	Kuala Lumpur, Malaysia
20:30 UTC+8	Norshahrul 26'; Zaquan Adha 45+3' (pen.), 88'	Report (AFFSZ); Report (AFF)		Stadium: Bukit Jalil National Stadium; Attendance: 83,777; Referee: Alireza Faghani (Iran)

1 December 2018 Semi-finals; First leg	Malaysia	0–0	Thailand	Kuala Lumpur, Malaysia
20:45 UTC+8		Report (AFFSZ); Report (AFF)		Stadium: Bukit Jalil National Stadium; Attendance: 87,545; Referee: Ahmed Al-Kaf (Oman)

5 December 2018 Semi-finals; Second leg	Thailand	2–2	Malaysia	Bangkok, Thailand
19:00 UTC+7	Irfan 21' (o.g.); Pansa 63'	Report (AFFSZ); Report (AFF)	Syahmi 28'; Norshahrul 71'	Stadium: Rajamangala Stadium; Attendance: 46,157; Referee: Adham Makhadmeh (Jordan)

11 December 2018 Final; First leg	Malaysia	2–2	Vietnam	Kuala Lumpur, Malaysia
20:45 UTC+8	Shahrul 36'; Safawi 60'	Report (AFFSZ); Report (AFF)	Nguyễn Huy Hùng 22'; Phạm Đức Huy 25'	Stadium: Bukit Jalil National Stadium; Attendance: 88,482; Referee: Chris Beath (Australia)

15 December 2018 Final; Second leg	Vietnam	1–0	Malaysia	Hanoi, Vietnam
19:30 UTC+7	Nguyễn Anh Đức 6'	Report (AFFSZ); Report (AFF)		Stadium: Mỹ Đình National Stadium; Attendance: 40,000; Referee: Alireza Faghani (Iran)

==== International Friendlies ====
1 April 2018 Friendly	Malaysia	2–2	Mongolia	Bukit Jalil, Kuala Lumpur
20:45 UTC+8	Fadhli Shas 32'; Akhyar Rashid 64'	Report	Enkhbileg Purevdorj 43'; Gankhuyag Serodyanjiv 70'	Stadium: Bukit Jalil National Stadium; Referee: Muhammad Nazmi Nasaruddin (Malaysia)

1 April 2018 Friendly	Malaysia	7–0	Bhutan	Bukit Jalil, Kuala Lumpur
20:45 UTC+8	Wan Zack Haikal 11'; Zaquan Adha 20', 37', 40', 55'; Irfan Zakaria 28'; Syafiq Ahmad 74'	Report		Stadium: Bukit Jalil National Stadium; Attendance: Nagor Amir Noor Mohamed (Malaysia)

5 July 2018 Friendly	Malaysia	1–0	Fiji	Cheras, Kuala Lumpur
20:45 UTC+8	Syafiq 20'	Report		Stadium: KLFA Stadium; Referee: Mongkolchai Pechsri (Thailand)

7 September 2018 Friendly	Chinese Taipei	2–0	Malaysia	Taipei, Taiwan
19:00 UTC+8	Wu Chun-ching 13'; Chu En-le 53'	Report		Stadium: Taipei Municipal Stadium; Referee: Murad Al Zawahreh (Jordan)

10 September 2018 Friendly	Cambodia	1–3	Malaysia	Phnom Penh, Cambodia
19:00 UTC+7	Visal 18'	Report	Shahrul 62'; Syazwan 74'; Shahrel 90+3'	Stadium: Phnom Penh Olympic Stadium; Referee: Nguyễn Hiền Triết (Vietnam)

12 October 2018 Friendly	Sri Lanka	1–4	Malaysia	Colombo, Sri Lanka
18:30 UTC+5:30	Madushan 29'	Report (WF)	Norshahrul 65'; Adam 76'; Puslas 85' (o.g.); Sumareh 90+1'	Stadium: Sugathadasa Stadium; Referee: Hettikamkanamge Perera (Sri Lanka)

16 October 2018 Friendly	Malaysia	0–1	Kyrgyzstan	Malacca, Malaysia
20:45 UTC+8		Report (WF)	Sagynbaev 68'	Stadium: Hang Jebat Stadium; Attendance: 6,196; Referee: Suhaizi Shukri (Malaysia)

3 November 2018 Friendly	Malaysia	3–0	Maldives	Kuala Lumpur, Malaysia
20:45 UTC+8	Zaquan Adha 16'; Safawi 81'; Sumareh 90+3'	Report (WF)		Stadium: Bukit Jalil National Stadium

=== Malaysia national under-23 football team ===
==== 2018 AFC U-23 Championship ====
Pos	Team	Pld	W	D	L	GF	GA	GD	Pts	Qualification
1	Iraq	3	2	1	0	5	1	+4	7	Knockout stage
2	Malaysia	3	1	1	1	3	5	−2	4	Knockout stage
3	Jordan	3	0	2	1	3	4	−1	2	
4	Saudi Arabia	3	0	2	1	2	3	−1	2	

Source: AFC
Rules for classification: Group stage tiebreakers

10 January 2018 Group stage	Iraq	4–1	Malaysia	Changshu, China
16:00	Jaffal 5'; Attwan 28'; Mhawi 56'; Al-Saedi 81'	Report	Safawi 79'	Stadium: Changshu Stadium; Attendance: 230; Referee: Valentin Kovalenko (Uzbekistan)

13 January 2018 Group stage	Malaysia	1–1	Jordan	Changshu, China
16:00	Safawi 43' (pen.)	Report	Al-Barri 16'	Stadium: Changshu Stadium; Attendance: 780; Referee: Ko Hyung-jin (South Korea)

16 January 2018 Group stage	Saudi Arabia	0–1	Malaysia	Kunshan, China
19:30		Report	Danial 28'	Stadium: Kunshan Stadium; Referee: Ryuji Sato (Japan)

20 January 2018 Quarter-finals	South Korea	2–1	Malaysia	Kunshan, China
16:00	Cho Jae-wan 1'; Han Seung-gyu 85'	Report	Thanabalan 67'	Stadium: Kunshan Stadium; Referee: Adham Makhadmeh (Jordan)

==== 2018 Asian Games ====
Pos	Team	Pld	W	D	L	GF	GA	GD	Pts	Qualification
1	Malaysia	3	2	0	1	7	5	+2	6 (Note: Head-to-head result: Malaysia 2–1 South Korea.)	Advance to knockout stage
2	South Korea	3	2	0	1	8	2	+6	6	Advance to knockout stage
3	Bahrain	3	1	1	1	5	10	−5	4	Advance to knockout stage
4	Kyrgyzstan	3	0	1	2	3	6	−3	1	
5	United Arab Emirates	0	0	0	0	0	0	0	0	Redrawn to Group C

Source: Asian Games 2018
Rules for classification: Group stage tiebreakers
Notes:

15 August 2018 Group stage	Kyrgyzstan	1–3	Malaysia	Bandung, Indonesia
16:00 UTC+7	Batyrkanov 55'	Report	Safawi 38' (pen.); Akhyar 60'; Syafiq 78'	Stadium: Jalak Harupat Stadium; Referee: Lau Fong Hei (Hong Kong)

17 August 2018 Group stage	Malaysia	2–1	South Korea	Bandung, Indonesia
19:00 UTC+7	Safawi 5', 45+1'	Report	Hwang Ui-jo 87'	Stadium: Jalak Harupat Stadium; Referee: Mohammed Al-Hoish (Saudi Arabia)

20 August 2018 Group stage	Malaysia	2–3	Bahrain	Cikarang, Indonesia
19:00 UTC+7	Syahmi 20'; Safawi 90+3' (pen.)	Report	Al-Hardan 33', 89'; Al-Shamsan 37'	Stadium: Wibawa Mukti Stadium; Referee: Yu Ming-hsun (Chinese Taipei)

24 August 2018 Round of 16	Malaysia	0–1	Japan	Bekasi, Indonesia
19:30 UTC+7		Report	Ueda 90' (pen.)	Stadium: Patriot Candrabhaga Stadium; Referee: Bijan Heidari (Iran)

=== Malaysia national under-19 football team ===
==== 2018 AFC U-19 Championship ====
Pos	Team	Pld	W	D	L	GF	GA	GD	Pts	Qualification
1	Saudi Arabia	3	3	0	0	6	2	+4	9	Knockout stage
2	Tajikistan	3	1	1	1	4	5	−1	4	Knockout stage
3	China	3	1	0	2	2	2	0	3	
4	Malaysia	3	0	1	2	3	6	−3	1	

Source: AFC
Rules for classification: Group stage tiebreakers

20 October 2018 Group stage	Saudi Arabia	2–1	Malaysia	Bekasi, Indonesia
16:00 UTC+7	Al-Ammar 24'; Al-Saleem 78'	Report	Hadi 88'	Stadium: Patriot Candrabhaga Stadium; Attendance: 181; Referee: Kim Hee-gon (South Korea)

23 October 2018 Group stage	Malaysia	2–2	Tajikistan	Bekasi, Indonesia
19:00 UTC+7	Hadi 11'; Hanonov 55' (o.g.)	Report	Panjshanbe 34' (pen.); Yodgorov 45+1'	Stadium: Patriot Candrabhaga Stadium; Attendance: 109; Referee: Ahmed Al-Ali (Jordan)

26 October 2018 Group stage	China	2–0	Malaysia	Cibinong, Indonesia
19:00 UTC+7	Tao Qianglong 44'; Xu Yue 58'	Report		Stadium: Pakansari Stadium; Attendance: 102; Referee: Khamis Al-Kuwari (Qatar)

==== 2018 AFF U-19 Youth Championship ====
Pos	Team	Pld	W	D	L	GF	GA	GD	Pts	Qualification
1	Malaysia	4	3	1	0	6	1	+5	10	Knockout stage
2	Myanmar	4	2	1	1	13	5	+8	7	Knockout stage
3	Cambodia	4	2	0	2	8	7	+1	6	
4	Timor-Leste	4	1	2	1	5	5	0	5	
5	Brunei	4	0	0	4	1	15	−14	0	

Source: drawing result

4 July 2018 Group stage	Cambodia	0–2	Malaysia	Gelora Joko Samudro Stadium, Gresik
15:30 (UTC+7)		Report	Shivan 39'; Akhyar 71'	Attendance: 50; Referee: Xaypaseuth Phongsanit (Laos)

6 July 2018 Group stage	Malaysia	2–0	Brunei	Gelora Joko Samudro Stadium, Gresik
15:30 (UTC+7)	Syahmi 5'; Nizarruddin 12'	Report		Referee: Wiwat Jumpaoon (Thailand)

8 July 2018 Group stage	Timor-Leste	1–1	Malaysia	Gelora Joko Samudro Stadium, Gresik
19:00 (UTC+7)	de Lima 13'	Report	Akhyar 30'	Referee: Oki Dwi Putra (Indonesia)

10 July 2018 Group stage	Malaysia	1–0	Myanmar	Gelora Delta Stadium, Sidoarjo
15:30 (UTC+7)	Shivan 17'	Report

12 July 2018 Semi-finals	Malaysia	1–1 (3–2 p)	Indonesia	Gelora Delta Stadium, Sidoarjo
19:00 (UTC+7)	Syaiful 14'	Report	Egy 2' (pen.)	Attendance: 26,000; Referee: Clifford Daypuyat (Philippines)
	Penalties
	Shivan Pillay (penalty scored); Nabil Hakim (penalty scored); Nik Akif (penalty scored); Zafuan Azeman (penalty missed)		(penalty scored) Luthfi Kamal; (penalty scored) Todd Ferre; (penalty missed) Witan Sulaeman; (penalty missed) Firza Andika; (penalty missed) Hanis Putra

14 July 2018 Final	Myanmar	3–4	Malaysia	Gelora Delta Stadium, Sidoarjo
19:00 (UTC+7)	Win Naing Tun 23', 26'; Myat Kaung Khant 31'		Awang Faiz 3'; Nik Akif 18', 90+3'; Shivan Pillay 76'	Referee: Nguyễn Hiền Triết (Vietnam)

=== Malaysia national under-16 football team ===
==== 2018 AFC U-16 Championship ====
Pos	Team	Pld	W	D	L	GF	GA	GD	Pts	Qualification
1	Japan	3	2	1	0	7	2	+5	7	Knockout stage
2	Tajikistan	3	1	1	1	4	7	−3	4	Knockout stage
3	Thailand	3	1	0	2	7	9	−2	3 (Note: Head-to-head result: Thailand 4–2 Malaysia.)	
4	Malaysia (H)	3	1	0	2	8	8	0	3	

Source: AFC
Rules for classification: Group stage tiebreakers
(H) Hosts
Notes:

20 September 2018 Group stage	Malaysia	6–2	Tajikistan	Kuala Lumpur, Malaysia
16:30 UTC+8	Luqman 30', 42', 46', 66'; Najmudin 33' (pen.); Mutalib 76' (pen.)	Report	Rahmatov 72' (pen.); Zairov 90+1'	Stadium: Bukit Jalil National Stadium; Attendance: 723; Referee: Ahmad Yacoub Ibrahim (Jordan)

23 September 2018 Group stage	Thailand	4–2	Malaysia	Kuala Lumpur, Malaysia
16:30 UTC+8	Suphanat 3', 21'; Waragon 57'; Apidet 85'	Report	Luqman 12'; Kaironnisam 48'	Stadium: Bukit Jalil National Stadium; Attendance: 8,596; Referee: Omar Mohamed Al-Ali (United Arab Emirates)

27 September 2018 Group stage	Malaysia	0–2	Japan	Kuala Lumpur, Malaysia
11:00 UTC+8		Report	Toyama 37'; Naruoka 90+3'	Stadium: Bukit Jalil National Stadium; Attendance: 8,378; Referee: Kim Woo-sung (South Korea)

==== 2018 AFF U-16 Youth Championship ====
Pos	Team	Pld	W	D	L	GF	GA	GD	Pts	Qualification
1	Thailand	4	3	1	0	12	2	+10	10	Knockout stage
2	Malaysia	4	3	0	1	12	3	+9	9	Knockout stage
3	Laos	4	2	1	1	5	4	+1	7	
4	Singapore	4	1	0	3	7	9	−2	3	
5	Brunei	4	0	0	4	3	21	−18	0	

Updated to match(es) played on 7 August 2018. Source: AFF

30 July 2018 Group stage	Thailand	2–1	Malaysia	Gresik, Indonesia
16:30 UTC+8	Ali Imran 14' (o.g.); Azlan Yusof 64 ' (o.g.)	Report	Azlan Yusof 46'	Stadium: Gelora Joko Samudro Stadium; Attendance: 212; Referee: Steve Suprencia (Philippines)

3 August 2018 Group stage	Malaysia	6–1	Brunei	Gresik, Indonesia
20:00 UTC+8	Asman Sukarnain 2', 50'; Fahmi Zaaim 27'; Ikhwan Hafizo 38'; Harith Naem 46'; Danial Amali 80+3'	Report	Eddy Omar 80' (pen.)	Stadium: Gelora Joko Samudro Stadium; Attendance: 48; Referee: Chy Samdy (Cambodia)

5 August 2018 Group stage	Malaysia	4–0	Singapore	Gresik, Indonesia
16:30 UTC+8	Alif Daniel 9'; Harith Naem 33'; Fahmi Zaaim 46'; Ryaan Sanizal 56' (o.g.)	Report		Stadium: Gelora Joko Samudro Stadium; Attendance: 95; Referee: Ngô Duy Lân (Vietnam)

7 August 2018 Group stage	Laos	0–1	Malaysia	Gresik, Indonesia
16:30 UTC+8		Report	Anantaza 4' (o.g.)	Stadium: Gelora Joko Samudro Stadium; Attendance: 119; Referee: Chy Samdy (Cambodia)

9 August 2018 Semi-finals	Indonesia	1–0	Malaysia	Sidoarjo, Indonesia
20:00 UTC+8	Amiruddin Bagus 72' (pen.)	Report		Stadium: Gelora Delta Stadium; Attendance: 24,000; Referee: Ngô Duy Lân (Vietnam)

11 August 2018 Third place	Malaysia	1–0	Myanmar	Sidoarjo, Indonesia
16:30 UTC+8	Alif Daniel 79'	Report		Stadium: Gelora Delta Stadium; Attendance: 5,100; Referee: Wiwat Jumpaoon (Thailand)

== League season ==
=== Liga Super ===
Pos	Team	Pld	W	D	L	GF	GA	GD	Pts	Qualification or relegation
1	Johor Darul Ta'zim (C)	22	19	2	1	47	9	+38	59	Qualification for the AFC Champions League group stage
2	Perak	22	10	6	6	35	27	+8	36	Qualification for the AFC Champions League second preliminary round
3	PKNS	22	10	5	7	37	29	+8	35	
4	Pahang	22	9	7	6	35	21	+14	34	
5	Terengganu	22	10	4	8	32	31	+1	34	
6	Kedah	22	9	5	8	37	36	+1	32	
7	Melaka United	22	9	4	9	33	38	−5	31	
8	Selangor	22	7	6	9	35	39	−4	27	
9	PKNP	22	7	4	11	25	31	−6	25	
10	Kuala Lumpur	22	7	3	12	39	51	−12	24	
11	Kelantan (R)	22	5	3	14	20	43	−23	18	Relegation to the Premier League
12	Negeri Sembilan (R)	22	4	3	15	27	47	−20	15	Relegation to the Premier League

Source: FAM, FMLLP
Rules for classification: 1) Points; 2) Goal difference; 3) Number of goals scored.
(C) Champions; (R) Relegated

=== Liga Premier ===
Pos	Team	Pld	W	D	L	GF	GA	GD	Pts	Promotion, qualification or relegation
1	Felda United (C, P)	20	12	7	1	44	24	+20	43	Promotion to 2019 Malaysia Super League
2	Felcra	20	9	7	4	30	24	+6	34	Withdraw from league for next season
3	MIFA (P)	20	9	5	6	36	26	+10	32	Promotion to 2019 Malaysia Super League
4	Johor Darul Ta'zim II	20	8	6	6	28	23	+5	30	
5	PDRM	20	8	5	7	28	31	−3	29	
6	Sabah	20	7	7	6	35	26	+9	28	
7	UKM	20	6	4	10	26	32	−6	22	
8	Sarawak	20	6	4	10	27	35	−8	22	
9	UiTM	20	6	4	10	23	36	−13	22	
10	Penang	20	5	6	9	20	30	−10	21	
11	Terengganu II	20	4	5	11	22	34	−12	17	

Updated to match(es) played on 30 December 2018. Source: FAM, FMLLP
Rules for classification: 1) Points; 2) Goal difference; 3) Number of goals scored.
(C) Champions; (P) Promoted

=== Piala FAM ===
Group A

Pos	Team	Pld	W	D	L	GF	GA	GD	Pts	Promotion or qualification
1	Selangor United	12	7	2	3	22	13	+9	23	Advance to knock-out stage
2	MOF	12	6	4	2	16	10	+6	22	Advance to knock-out stage
3	ATM	12	6	4	2	14	9	+5	22	
4	Kuching	12	5	3	4	13	13	0	18	
5	Shahzan Muda	12	2	5	5	9	12	−3	11	
6	DBKL	12	3	2	7	10	18	−8	11	
7	MPKB-BRI U-Bes	12	2	2	8	13	21	−8	8	

Updated to match(es) played on 29 July 2018. Source: PengurusanBolasepakFAM
Rules for classification: 1) Points; 2) Goal difference; 3) Number of goals scored

Group B

Pos	Team	Pld	W	D	L	GF	GA	GD	Pts	Promotion or qualification
1	Terengganu City	8	6	0	2	12	7	+5	18	Advance to knock-out stage
2	PJ Rangers	8	4	2	2	17	9	+8	14	Advance to knock-out stage
3	D'AR Wanderers	8	4	0	4	13	16	−3	12	
4	Young Fighters	8	3	1	4	7	8	−1	10	
5	Perlis	8	1	1	6	5	14	−9	4	

Updated to match(es) played on 29 July 2018. Source: PengurusanBolasepakFAM
Rules for classification: 1) Points; 2) Goal difference; 3) Number of goals scored

== Domestic Cups ==
=== Charity Shield ===
3 February 2018
21:00 UTC+8

Johor Darul Ta'zim	2 -1	Kedah
Figueroa 28'; Antonio 57'	report	Pallares 14'

Larkin Stadium, Johor Bahru, Johor
Attendance: 23020
Referee: Mohd Zohri Tajuddin (Malaysia)

=== FA Cup ===
7 July 2018
21:00 UTC+8

Selangor	0–2	Pahang
	Report	Azam Azih 23'; Patrick Cruz 62' (pen.)

Bukit Jalil National Stadium, Bukit Jalil, Kuala Lumpur
Attendance: 43,512
Referee: Zulkarnain Zakaria

=== Malaysia Cup ===
==== Final ====
27 October 2018
21:00 UTC+8

Terengganu	3-3	Perak
Kipré Tchétché 1', 42'; Igor Zonjić (yellow card) 59'; Lee Tuck (yellow card) 66' (yellow-red card); Faiz Nasir 96'	Report	Wander Luiz (yellow card) 35'; Firdaus Saiyadi 47'; Gilmar (yellow card) 56' (yellow-red card); Brendan Gan 90+1'; Igor Zonjić (Own Goal) 120+1'; Leandro (yellow card) 120+1'
Penalties
Igor Zonjić (penalty missed); Thierry Bin (penalty missed); Nasrullah Haniff (penalty scored)	1–4	(penalty scored) Wander Luiz; (penalty scored) Amirul Azhan; (penalty scored) Shahrul Saad; (penalty scored) Leandro

Shah Alam Stadium, Shah Alam
Referee: Suresh Jayaraman

=== Final ===
The first legs will be played on 8 October 2018, and the second legs will be played on 15 October 2018

8 October 2018
20:15 UTC+8

UKM	2−2	Terengganu II

Shah Alam Stadium, Shah Alam
15 October 2018
20:15 UTC+8

Terengganu II	2−0	UKM
Akanni-Sunday Wasiu 22', 53'

Sultan Ismail Nasiruddin Shah Stadium, Kuala Terengganu

Terengganu II won 4−2 on aggregate.

== Malaysian clubs in Asia ==
=== Johor Darul Ta'zim ===
==== AFC Champions League ====
===== Qualifying play-off =====
23 January 2018 Preliminary round 2	Muangthong United (Thailand)	5–2	(Malaysia) Johor Darul Ta'zim	Supachalasai National Stadium, Bangkok
19:30 UTC+7	Sarach 7'; Tristan 21'; Heberty 29' (pen.), 63'; Theerathon 56'	Report	Díaz 90+2', 90+5'	Attendance: 7,949; Referee: Aziz Asimov (Uzbekistan)

==== AFC Cup ====
===== Group stage =====
Pos	Team	Pld	W	D	L	GF	GA	GD	Pts	Qualification	PSJ	SLN	JDT	TAM
1	(Indonesia) Persija Jakarta	6	4	1	1	13	6	+7	13	Zonal semi-finals	—	1–0	4–0	4–1
2	(Vietnam) Sông Lam Nghệ An	6	3	1	2	8	5	+3	10 (Note: Head-to-head results: Sông Lam Nghệ An 2–0 Johor Darul Ta'zim, Johor Darul Ta'zim 3–2 Sông Lam Nghệ An.)		0–0	—	2–0	2–1
3	(Malaysia) Johor Darul Ta'zim	6	3	1	2	8	9	−1	10		3–0	3–2	—	2–1
4	(Singapore) Tampines Rovers	6	0	1	5	5	14	−9	1		2–4	0–2	0–0	—

Source: AFC
Rules for classification: Group stage tiebreakers
Notes:

14 February 2018	Johor Darul Ta'zim (Malaysia)	3–0	(Indonesia) Persija Jakarta	Tan Sri Dato' Haji Hassan Yunos Stadium, Johor Bahru
20:45 UTC+8	Hazwan 29'; Díaz 42'; Safawi 76'	Report		Attendance: 18,600; Referee: Saoud Al-Athbah (Qatar)

28 February 2018	Sông Lam Nghệ An (Vietnam)	2–0	(Malaysia) Johor Darul Ta'zim	Vinh Stadium, Vinh
15:30 UTC+8	Phan Văn Đức 22'; Phạm Xuân Mạnh 90+4'	Report		Attendance: 6,000; Referee: Mahmood Al-Majarafi (Oman)

6 March 2018	Tampines Rovers (Singapore)	0–0	(Malaysia) Johor Darul Ta'zim	Jalan Besar Stadium, Singapore
19:30 UTC+8		Report		Attendance: 2,250; Referee: Hussein Abo Yehia (Lebanon)

14 March 2018	Johor Darul Ta'zim (Malaysia)	2–1	(Singapore) Tampines Rovers	Tan Sri Dato' Haji Hassan Yunos Stadium, Johor Bahru
20:45 UTC+8	Safawi 13'; Hazwan 79'	Report	Khairul 45' (pen.)	Attendance: 8,750; Referee: Payam Heidari (Iran)

10 April 2018	Persija Jakarta (Indonesia)	4–0	(Malaysia) Johor Darul Ta'zim	Gelora Bung Karno Stadium, Jakarta
18:30 UTC+7	Šimić 8', 12', 19', 87' (pen.)	Report		Attendance: 60,157; Referee: Sivakorn Pu-udom (Thailand)

24 April 2018	Johor Darul Ta'zim (Malaysia)	3–2	(Vietnam) Sông Lam Nghệ An	Tan Sri Dato' Haji Hassan Yunos Stadium, Johor Bahru
20:00 UTC+8	Safawi 36'; Syafiq 39'; Safiq 67' (pen.)	Report	Nguyễn Viết Nguyên 41'; Hồ Tuấn Tài 45+1'	Attendance: 5,170; Referee: Kim Hee-gon (South Korea)
