= 2018 AFC U-23 Championship =

2018年亚足联U-23锦标赛

Tournament details
- Host country: China
- Dates: 9–27 January
- Teams: 16 (from 1 confederation)
- Venues: 4 (in 4 host cities)

Final positions
- Champions: Uzbekistan (1st title)
- Runners-up: Vietnam
- Third place: Qatar
- Fourth place: South Korea

Tournament statistics
- Matches played: 32
- Goals scored: 82 (2.56 per match)
- Attendance: 65,850 (2,058 per match)
- Top scorer: (Qatar) Almoez Ali (6 goals)
- Best player: (Uzbekistan) Odiljon Hamrobekov
- Fair play award: Vietnam

The 2018 AFC U-23 Championship (also known as the 2018 AFC U-23 Asian Cup) was the third edition of the AFC U-23 Championship, the biennial international age-restricted football championship organised by the Asian Football Confederation (AFC) for the men's under-23 national teams of Asia. A total of 16 teams competed in the tournament. It took place between 9–27 January 2018, and was hosted by China.

Uzbekistan defeated Vietnam in the final to win their first title. Japan were the defending champions, but failed to defend the title after losing to Uzbekistan in the quarter-finals.

== Hosts selection ==
- China

== Qualification ==
The qualifiers were held from 15 to 23 July 2017. China also participated in the qualifiers, even though they had already qualified automatically as hosts.

=== Qualified teams ===
The following 16 teams qualified for the final tournament.

Team	Qualified as	Appearance	Previous best performance
China	Hosts	3rd	Group stage (2013, 2016)
Oman	Group A winners	2nd	Group stage (2013)
Iraq	Group B winners	3rd	Champions (2013)
Qatar	Group C winners	2nd	Fourth place (2016)
Uzbekistan	Group D winners	3rd	Group stage (2013, 2016)
Palestine	Group E winners	1st	Debut
Australia	Group F winners	3rd	Quarter-finals (2013)
North Korea	Group G winners	3rd	Quarter-finals (2016)
Malaysia	Group H winners	1st	Debut
South Korea	Group I winners	3rd	Runners-up (2016)
Thailand	Group H runners-up (Note: As China (Group J winners) had already automatically qualified for the final tournament as hosts, the six best runners-up qualified for the final tournament.)	2nd	Group stage (2016)
Syria	Group C runners-up	3rd	Quarter-finals (2013)
Vietnam	Group I runners-up	2nd	Group stage (2016)
Jordan	Group E runners-up	3rd	Third place (2013)
Japan	Group J runners-up	3rd	Champions (2016)
Saudi Arabia	Group B runners-up	3rd	Runners-up (2013)

== Venues ==
The competition was played in four venues in four cities, all in the province of Jiangsu.

Changzhou	Kunshan
Changzhou Olympic Sports Centre	Kunshan Stadium
Capacity: 38,000	Capacity: 25,000
2018 AFC U-23 Championship is located in Jiangsu
Jiangyin	Changshu
Jiangyin Stadium	Changshu Stadium
Capacity: 32,000	Capacity: 35,000

== Draw ==
The draw of the final tournament was held on 24 October 2017, 16:00 CST (UTC+8), at the Traders Fudu Hotel in Changzhou. The 16 teams were drawn into four groups of four teams. The teams were seeded according to their performance in the 2016 AFC U-23 Championship final tournament and qualification, with the hosts China automatically seeded and assigned to Position A1 in the draw.

Pot 1	Pot 2	Pot 3	Pot 4
1. China (hosts); 2. Japan; 3. South Korea; 4. Iraq	5. Qatar; 6. North Korea; 7. Jordan; 8. Australia	9. Uzbekistan; 10. Syria; 11. Saudi Arabia; 12. Thailand	13. Vietnam; 14. Oman; 15. Malaysia; 16. Palestine

== Match officials ==
The following referees were chosen for the 2018 AFC U-23 Championship. Additional assistant referees were used in this tournament.

Referees

- (Australia) Chris Beath
- (Australia) Peter Green
- (Bahrain) Nawaf Shukralla
- (China) Fu Ming
- (China) Ma Ning
- (Hong Kong) Liu Kwok Man
- (Iran) Alireza Faghani
- (Iraq) Ali Sabah
- (Iraq) Mohanad Qasim Eesee Sarray
- (Japan) Ryuji Sato
- (Japan) Jumpei Iida
- (Jordan) Adham Makhadmeh
- (South Korea) Kim Dong-jin
- (South Korea) Ko Hyung-jin
- (Oman) Ahmed Al-Kaf
- (Qatar) Abdulrahman Al-Jassim
- (Qatar) Khamis Al-Marri
- (Saudi Arabia) Fahad Al-Mirdasi
- (Saudi Arabia) Turki Al-Khudhayr
- (Singapore) Muhammad Taqi
- (Sri Lanka) Hettikamkanamge Perera
- (United Arab Emirates) Mohammed Abdulla Hassan Mohamed
- (Uzbekistan) Ravshan Irmatov
- (Uzbekistan) Valentin Kovalenko

Assistant referees

- (Australia) Matthew Cream
- (Bahrain) Ebrahim Saleh
- (Bahrain) Yaser Tulefat
- (China) Cao Yi
- (China) Huo Weiming
- (Iran) Mohammadreza Mansouri
- (Iran) Reza Sokhandan
- (Japan) Yagi Akane
- (Japan) Toru Sagara
- (Jordan) Ahmad Al-Roalle
- (South Korea) Yoon Kwang-yeol
- (Kyrgyzstan) Sergei Grishchenko
- (Malaysia) Mohd Yusri Mohamad
- (Oman) Abu Bakar Al-Amri
- (Qatar) Saud Al-Maqaleh
- (Qatar) Taleb Al-Marri
- (Saudi Arabia) Mohammed Al-Abakry
- (Saudi Arabia) Abdullah Al-Shalawi
- (Singapore) Ronnie Koh Min Kiat
- (Sri Lanka) Palitha Hemathunga
- (United Arab Emirates) Mohamed Al-Hammadi
- (United Arab Emirates) Hasan Al-Mahri
- (Uzbekistan) Abdukhamidullo Rasulov
- (Uzbekistan) Jakhongir Saidov

Support referees

- (Japan) Minoru Tōjō
- (Uzbekistan) Ilgiz Tantashev

Support assistant referees

- (Syria) Ahmad Ali
- (Vietnam) Nguyễn Trung Hậu

== Squads ==
Players born on or after 1 January 1995 are eligible to compete in the tournament. Each team must register a squad of minimum 18 players and maximum 23 players, minimum three of whom must be goalkeepers (Regulations Articles 24.1 and 24.2).

== Group stage ==
The top two teams of each group advance to the quarter-finals.

Tiebreakers

Teams are ranked according to points (3 points for a win, 1 point for a draw, 0 points for a loss), and if tied on points, the following tiebreaking criteria are applied, in the order given, to determine the rankings (Regulations Article 9.3):

1. Points in head-to-head matches among tied teams;
2. Goal difference in head-to-head matches among tied teams;
3. Goals scored in head-to-head matches among tied teams;
4. If more than two teams are tied, and after applying all head-to-head criteria above, a subset of teams are still tied, all head-to-head criteria above are reapplied exclusively to this subset of teams;
5. Goal difference in all group matches;
6. Goals scored in all group matches;
7. Penalty shoot-out if only two teams are tied and they met in the last round of the group;
8. Disciplinary points (yellow card = 1 point, red card as a result of two yellow cards = 3 points, direct red card = 3 points, yellow card followed by direct red card = 4 points);
9. Drawing of lots.

All times are local, CST (UTC+8).

Schedule
Matchday	Dates	Matches
Matchday 1	9–11 January 2018	1 v 4, 2 v 3
Matchday 2	12–14 January 2018	4 v 2, 3 v 1
Matchday 3	15–17 January 2018	1 v 2, 3 v 4

=== Group A ===
Pos	Team	Pld	W	D	L	GF	GA	GD	Pts	Qualification
1	Qatar	3	3	0	0	4	1	+3	9	Knockout stage
2	Uzbekistan	3	2	0	1	2	1	+1	6	Knockout stage
3	China (H)	3	1	0	2	4	3	+1	3	
4	Oman	3	0	0	3	0	5	−5	0	

Source: AFC
Rules for classification: Group stage tiebreakers
(H) Hosts
9 January 2018
16:00

China	3–0	Oman
Yang Liyu 30'; Li Xiaoming 34'; Wei Shihao 53'	Live Report; Stats Report

Changzhou Olympic Sports Centre, Changzhou
Attendance: 11,800
Referee: Chris Beath (Australia)
9 January 2018
19:30

Qatar	1–0	Uzbekistan
Almoez Ali 55'	Live Report; Stats Report

Changzhou Olympic Sports Centre, Changzhou
Attendance: 1,100
Referee: Kim Dong-jin (South Korea)

12 January 2018
16:00

Uzbekistan	1–0	China
Alijonov 14'	Live Report; Stats Report

Changzhou Olympic Sports Centre, Changzhou
Attendance: 13,800
Referee: Muhammad Taqi (Singapore)
12 January 2018
19:30

Oman	0–1	Qatar
	Live Report; Stats Report	Afif 43'

Changzhou Olympic Sports Centre, Changzhou
Attendance: 820
Referee: Ali Sabah (Iraq)

15 January 2018
16:00

China	1–2	Qatar
Yao Junsheng 3'	Live Report; Stats Report	Almoez Ali 44', 77'

Changzhou Olympic Sports Centre, Changzhou
Attendance: 15,600
Referee: Alireza Faghani (Iran)
15 January 2018
16:00

Uzbekistan	1–0	Oman
Tursunov 36'	Live Report; Stats Report

Jiangyin Stadium, Jiangyin
Attendance: 380
Referee: Hettikamkanamge Perera (Sri Lanka)

=== Group B ===
Pos	Team	Pld	W	D	L	GF	GA	GD	Pts	Qualification
1	Japan	3	3	0	0	5	1	+4	9	Knockout stage
2	Palestine	3	1	1	1	6	3	+3	4	Knockout stage
3	North Korea	3	1	1	1	3	4	−1	4	
4	Thailand	3	0	0	3	1	7	−6	0	

Source: AFC
Rules for classification: Group stage tiebreakers
10 January 2018
16:00

North Korea	1–0	Thailand
Ri Hun 2'	Live Report; Stats Report

Jiangyin Stadium, Jiangyin
Attendance: 680
Referee: Adham Makhadmeh (Jordan)
10 January 2018
19:30

Japan	1–0	Palestine
Itakura 20'	Live Report; Stats Report

Jiangyin Stadium, Jiangyin
Attendance: 360
Referee: Fu Ming (China)

13 January 2018
16:00

Palestine	1–1	North Korea
Dabbagh 16'	Live Report; Stats Report	Rashid 74' (o.g.)

Jiangyin Stadium, Jiangyin
Attendance: 560
Referee: Peter Green (Australia)
13 January 2018
19:30

Thailand	0–1	Japan
	Live Report; Stats Report	Itakura 90'

Jiangyin Stadium, Jiangyin
Attendance: 1,080
Referee: Liu Kwok Man (Hong Kong)

16 January 2018
16:00

Japan	3–1	North Korea
Yanagi 32'; Miyoshi 43'; Kang Ju-hyok 73' (o.g.)	Live Report; Stats Report	Kim Yu-song 52'

Jiangyin Stadium, Jiangyin
Attendance: 320
Referee: Fahad Al-Mirdasi (Saudi Arabia)
16 January 2018
16:00

Thailand	1–5	Palestine
Chenrop 44'	Live Report; Stats Report	Fannoun 15'; Dabbagh 26'; Yousef 30'; Darwish 32'; Qumbor 88'

Changzhou Olympic Sports Centre, Changzhou
Attendance: 120
Referee: Nawaf Shukralla (Bahrain)

=== Group C ===
Pos	Team	Pld	W	D	L	GF	GA	GD	Pts	Qualification
1	Iraq	3	2	1	0	5	1	+4	7	Knockout stage
2	Malaysia	3	1	1	1	3	5	−2	4	Knockout stage
3	Jordan	3	0	2	1	3	4	−1	2	
4	Saudi Arabia	3	0	2	1	2	3	−1	2	

Source: AFC
Rules for classification: Group stage tiebreakers
10 January 2018
16:00

Iraq	4–1	Malaysia
Jaffal 5'; Attwan 28'; Mhawi 56'; Ali 81'	Live Report; Stats Report	Safawi 79'

Changshu Stadium, Changshu
Attendance: 230
Referee: Valentin Kovalenko (Uzbekistan)
10 January 2018
19:30

Jordan	2–2	Saudi Arabia
Faisal 12', 78'	Live Report; Stats Report	Al-Amri 85'; Al-Shamlan 90+4' (pen.)

Changshu Stadium, Changshu
Attendance: 240
Referee: Jumpei Iida (Japan)

13 January 2018
16:00

Malaysia	1–1	Jordan
Safawi 43' (pen.)	Live Report; Stats Report	Al-Barri 16'

Changshu Stadium, Changshu
Attendance: 780
Referee: Ko Hyung-jin (South Korea)
13 January 2018
19:30

Saudi Arabia	0–0	Iraq
	Live Report; Stats Report

Changshu Stadium, Changshu
Attendance: 1,010
Referee: Ma Ning (China)

16 January 2018
19:30

Iraq	1–0	Jordan
Resan 49'	Live Report; Stats Report

Changshu Stadium, Changshu
Attendance: 380
Referee: Mohammed Abdulla Hassan Mohamed (United Arab Emirates)
16 January 2018
19:30

Saudi Arabia	0–1	Malaysia
	Live Report; Stats Report	Danial 28'

Kunshan Stadium, Kunshan
Attendance: 482
Referee: Ryuji Sato (Japan)

=== Group D ===
Pos	Team	Pld	W	D	L	GF	GA	GD	Pts	Qualification
1	South Korea	3	2	1	0	5	3	+2	7	Knockout stage
2	Vietnam	3	1	1	1	2	2	0	4	Knockout stage
3	Australia	3	1	0	2	5	5	0	3	
4	Syria	3	0	2	1	1	3	−2	2	

Source: AFC
Rules for classification: Group stage tiebreakers
11 January 2018
16:00

Australia	3–1	Syria
Blackwood 8', 77'; Kamau 43'	Live Report; Stats Report	Deng 53' (o.g.)

Kunshan Stadium, Kunshan
Attendance: 1,528
Referee: Khamis Al-Marri (Qatar)
11 January 2018
19:30

South Korea	2–1	Vietnam
Cho Young-wook 29'; Lee Keun-ho 73'	Live Report; Stats Report	Nguyễn Quang Hải 17'

Kunshan Stadium, Kunshan
Attendance: 766
Referee: Turki Al-Khudhayr (Saudi Arabia)

14 January 2018
16:00

Vietnam	1–0	Australia
Nguyễn Quang Hải 72'	Live Report; Stats Report

Kunshan Stadium, Kunshan
Attendance: 2,362
Referee: Mohanad Qasim Eesee Sarray (Iraq)
14 January 2018
19:30

Syria	0–0	South Korea
	Live Report; Stats Report

Kunshan Stadium, Kunshan
Attendance: 685
Referee: Ravshan Irmatov (Uzbekistan)

17 January 2018
19:30

South Korea	3–2	Australia
Lee Keun-ho 18', 65'; Han Seung-gyu 44'	Live Report; Stats Report	Cowburn 72'; Buhagiar 76'

Kunshan Stadium, Kunshan
Attendance: 678
Referee: Abdulrahman Al-Jassim (Qatar)
17 January 2018
19:30

Syria	0–0	Vietnam
	Live Report; Stats Report

Changshu Stadium, Changshu
Attendance: 400
Referee: Ahmed Al-Kaf (Oman)

== Knockout stage ==
In the knockout stage, extra time and penalty shoot-out are used to decide the winner if necessary (Regulations Articles 12.1 and 12.2).

=== Bracket ===
Quarter-finals
19 January – Changzhou
Qatar	3
Palestine	2
20 January – Changshu
Iraq	3 (3)
Vietnam (p)	3 (5)
19 January – Jiangyin
Japan	0
Uzbekistan	4
20 January – Kunshan
South Korea	2
Malaysia	1

Semi-finals
23 January – Changzhou
Qatar	2 (3)
Vietnam (p)	2 (4)
23 January – Kunshan
Uzbekistan (a.e.t.)	4
South Korea	1

Final
27 January – Changzhou
Vietnam	1
Uzbekistan (a.e.t.)	2
Third place match
26 January – Kunshan
Qatar	1
South Korea	0

=== Quarter-finals ===
19 January 2018
16:00

Japan	0–4	Uzbekistan
	Live Report; Stats Report	Sidikov 31'; Khamdamov 34'; Yakhshiboev 39', 47'

Jiangyin Stadium, Jiangyin
Attendance: 380
Referee: Fu Ming (China)

19 January 2018
19:30

Qatar	3–2	Palestine
Almoez Ali 32', 34'; Hashim Ali 53'	Live Report; Stats Report	Dabbagh 60'; Darwish 87'

Changzhou Olympic Sports Centre, Changzhou
Attendance: 226
Referee: Hettikamkanamge Perera (Sri Lanka)

20 January 2018
16:00

South Korea	2–1	Malaysia
Cho Jae-wan 1'; Han Seung-gyu 85'	Live Report; Stats Report	Thanabalan 67'

Kunshan Stadium, Kunshan
Attendance: 738
Referee: Adham Makhadmeh (Jordan)

20 January 2018
19:30

Iraq	3–3 (a.e.t.)	Vietnam
Hussein 29' (pen.), 94'; Mhawi 116'	Live Report; Stats Report	Nguyễn Công Phượng 12'; Phan Văn Đức 108'; Hà Đức Chinh 112'
Penalties
Resan (penalty missed); Hussein (penalty scored); Mhawi (penalty scored); Attwan (penalty scored)	3–5	(penalty scored) Vũ Văn Thanh; (penalty scored) Nguyễn Quang Hải; (penalty scored) Lương Xuân Trường; (penalty scored) Hà Đức Chinh; (penalty scored) Bùi Tiến Dũng

Changshu Stadium, Changshu
Attendance: 980
Referee: Chris Beath (Australia)

=== Semi-finals ===
23 January 2018
16:00

Qatar	2–2 (a.e.t.)	Vietnam
Afif 39' (pen.); Almoez Ali 87'	Live Report; Stats Report	Nguyễn Quang Hải 69', 88'
Penalties
Afif (penalty scored); Moein (penalty missed); Al-Shammeri (penalty scored); Almoez Ali (penalty scored); Al-Brake (penalty missed)	3–4	(penalty missed) Nguyễn Quang Hải; (penalty scored) Lương Xuân Trường; (penalty scored) Hà Đức Chinh; (penalty scored) Phan Văn Đức; (penalty scored) Vũ Văn Thanh

Changzhou Olympic Sports Centre, Changzhou
Attendance: 630
Referee: Muhammad Taqi (Singapore)

23 January 2018
19:30

Uzbekistan	4–1 (a.e.t.)	South Korea
Urinboev 33'; Ganiev 99'; Yakhshiboev 110'; Komilov 120+1'	Live Report; Stats Report	Hwang Hyun-soo 58'

Kunshan Stadium, Kunshan
Attendance: 367
Referee: Turki Al-Khudhayr (Saudi Arabia)

=== Third place match ===
26 January 2018
16:00

Qatar	1–0	South Korea
Afif 39'	Live Report; Stats Report

Kunshan Stadium, Kunshan
Attendance: 168
Referee: Adham Makhadmeh (Jordan)

=== Final ===
27 January 2018
16:00

Vietnam	1–2 (a.e.t.)	Uzbekistan
Nguyễn Quang Hải 41'	Live Report; Stats Report	Ashurmatov 8'; Sidorov 120'

Changzhou Olympic Sports Centre, Changzhou
Attendance: 6,200
Referee: Ahmed Al-Kaf (Oman)

== Winners ==
2018 AFC U-23 Championship
(Uzbekistan)
Uzbekistan
1st title

== Awards ==
The following awards were given at the conclusion of the tournament:

Top Goalscorer	Most Valuable Player	Fair Play award
(Qatar) Almoez Ali	(Uzbekistan) Odiljon Hamrobekov	Vietnam

== Statistics ==
=== Goalscorers ===
There were 82 goals scored in 32 matches, for an average of 2.56 goals per match.

6 goals

- (Qatar) Almoez Ali

5 goals

- (Vietnam) Nguyễn Quang Hải

3 goals

- (Palestine) Oday Dabbagh
- (Qatar) Akram Afif
- (South Korea) Lee Keun-ho
- (Uzbekistan) Jasurbek Yakhshiboev

2 goals

- (Australia) George Blackwood
- (Iraq) Ayman Hussein
- (Iraq) Alaa Ali Mhawi
- (Japan) Ko Itakura
- (Jordan) Baha' Faisal
- (Malaysia) Safawi Rasid
- (Palestine) Mohamed Darwish
- (South Korea) Han Seung-gyu

1 goal

- (Australia) Trent Buhagiar
- (Australia) Nick Cowburn
- (Australia) Bruce Kamau
- (China) Li Xiaoming
- (China) Wei Shihao
- (China) Yang Liyu
- (China) Yao Junsheng
- (Iraq) Hussein Ali
- (Iraq) Amjad Attwan
- (Iraq) Mohammed Jaffal
- (Iraq) Bashar Resan
- (Japan) Koji Miyoshi
- (Japan) Takahiro Yanagi
- (Jordan) Ward Al-Barri
- (Malaysia) Danial Amier Norhisham
- (Malaysia) Thanabalan Nadarajah
- (North Korea) Kim Yu-song
- (North Korea) Ri Hun
- (Palestine) Mohanad Fannoun
- (Palestine) Shehab Qumbor
- (Palestine) Mahmoud Yousef
- (Qatar) Hashim Ali
- (Saudi Arabia) Abdulelah Al-Amri
- (Saudi Arabia) Rakan Al-Shamlan
- (South Korea) Cho Jae-wan (Note: Fastest goal in the tournament)
- (South Korea) Cho Young-wook
- (South Korea) Hwang Hyun-soo
- (Thailand) Chenrop Samphaodi
- (Uzbekistan) Khojiakbar Alijonov
- (Uzbekistan) Rustam Ashurmatov
- (Uzbekistan) Azizjon Ganiev
- (Uzbekistan) Dostonbek Khamdamov
- (Uzbekistan) Akramjon Komilov
- (Uzbekistan) Javokhir Sidikov
- (Uzbekistan) Andrey Sidorov
- (Uzbekistan) Dostonbek Tursunov
- (Uzbekistan) Zabikhillo Urinboev
- (Vietnam) Hà Đức Chinh
- (Vietnam) Nguyễn Công Phượng
- (Vietnam) Phan Văn Đức

1 own goal

- (Australia) Thomas Deng (against Syria)
- (North Korea) Kang Ju-hyok (against Japan)
- (Palestine) Mohammed Rashid (against North Korea)

== Broadcasting rights ==
- Arab League: beIN Sports (MENA), Alkaas Sports Channels
- Australia: Fox Sports Australia
- China: CCTV, PPTV, Guangdong Sports
- ASEAN: Fox Sports Asia
- South Korea: JTBC3 Fox Sports
- Vietnam: VTV (shared by Fox Sports Asia)
