= South Korea national under-23 football team results (2010–2019) =

- Win Draw Loss

This article is the list of international matches of the South Korea national under-23 football team from 2010 to 2019. Under-21 and under-22 games are also included in the list.

== Results by year ==
Year	Pld	W	D	L	Win %
2010	8	5	0	3	62.50
2011	8	6	2	0	75.00
2012	22	13	7	2	59.09
2013	1	0	0	1	0.00
2014	21	12	5	4	57.14
2015	15	9	5	1	60.00
2016	18	11	5	2	61.11
2017	3	2	1	0	66.67
2018	14	10	1	3	71.43
2019	9	5	3	1	55.56
Total	119	73	29	17	61.34

== Under-23 matches ==
=== 2010 ===
25 July Friendly	Malaysia	1–0	South Korea	Kuala Lumpur, Malaysia
15:00 MST (UTC+08)	Safiq 51'			Stadium: Bukit Jalil National Stadium; Attendance: 10,000; Referee: Subkhiddin Mohd Salleh (Malaysia)

8 November 2010 Asian Games (Group C)	South Korea	0–1	North Korea	Guangzhou, China
16:00 CST (UTC+08)			Ri Kwang-chon 36'	Stadium: Yuexiushan Stadium; Attendance: 5,000; Referee: Ben Williams (Australia)

10 November 2010 Asian Games (Group C)	South Korea	4–0	Jordan	Guangzhou, China
16:00 CST (UTC+08)	Koo Ja-cheol 21', 44'; Kim Bo-kyung 46'; Cho Young-cheol 78'			Stadium: Yuexiushan Stadium; Referee: Tayeb Shamsuzzaman (Bangladesh)

13 November 2010 Asian Games (Group C)	South Korea	3–0	Palestine	Guangzhou, China
16:00 CST (UTC+08)	Yoon Bit-garam 10'; Park Chu-young 13'; Park Hee-sung 52'			Stadium: Yuexiushan Stadium; Attendance: 10,000; Referee: Ibrahim Al-Hosni (Oman)

15 November 2010 Asian Games (Round of 16)	China	0–3	South Korea	Guangzhou, China
19:00 CST (UTC+08)			Kim Jung-woo 20'; Park Chu-young 50'; Cho Young-cheol 58'	Stadium: Tianhe Stadium; Attendance: 55,000; Referee: Saeid Mozaffarizadeh (Iran)

19 November 2010 Asian Games (Quarter-finals)	South Korea	3–1 (a.e.t.)	Uzbekistan	Guangzhou, China
19:00 CST (UTC+08)	Hong Jeong-ho 3'; Park Chu-young 93'; Kim Bo-kyung 102'		Karimov 72'	Stadium: Tianhe Stadium; Attendance: 40,000; Referee: Minoru Tojo (Japan)

23 November 2010 Asian Games (Semi-finals)	South Korea	0–1 (a.e.t.)	United Arab Emirates	Guangzhou, China
19:00 CST (UTC+08)			Ali 120+2'	Stadium: Tianhe Stadium; Attendance: 40,000; Referee: Ben Williams (Australia)

25 November 2010 Asian Games (Bronze medal match)	South Korea	4–3	Iran	Guangzhou, China
15:30 CST (UTC+08)	Koo Ja-cheol 48'; Park Chu-young 77'; Ji Dong-won 88', 89'		Rezaei 5'; Aliaskari 45+2'; Ansarifard 49'	Stadium: Tianhe Stadium; Attendance: 40,000; Referee: Kadhum Auda (Iraq)

=== 2011 ===
27 March Friendly	South Korea	1–0	China	Ulsan, South Korea
15:00 KST (UTC+09)	Kim Dong-sub 13'			Stadium: Ulsan Munsu Football Stadium; Attendance: 31,274; Referee: Sato Ryuji (Japan)

1 June Friendly	South Korea	3–1	Oman	Gangneung, South Korea
19:00 KST (UTC+09)	Hwang Do-yeon 47'; Bae Chun-suk 57', 81'		Al-Hadhri 23'	Stadium: Gangneung Stadium; Attendance: 18,729; Referee: Tan Hai (China PR)

19 June 2012 Summer Olympics (Qualification)	South Korea	3–1	Jordan	Seoul, South Korea
15:00 KST (UTC+09)	Kim Tae-hwan 54'; Yoon Bit-garam 75' (pen.); Kim Dong-sub 85'		Za'tara 45'	Stadium: Seoul World Cup Stadium; Attendance: 35,224; Referee: Tan Hai (China PR)

23 June 2012 Summer Olympics (Qualification)	Jordan	1–1	South Korea	Amman, Jordan
18:00 AST (UTC+03)	Al-Daradreh 42'		Hong Chul 71'	Stadium: Amman International Stadium; Attendance: 1,350; Referee: Abdul Malik Bin Abdul Bashir (Singapore)

21 September 2012 Summer Olympics (Qualification)	South Korea	2–0	Oman	Changwon, South Korea
20:00 KST (UTC+09)	Yoon Bit-garam 23'; Kim Bo-kyung 73'			Stadium: Changwon Football Center; Attendance: 13,704; Referee: Ravshan Irmatov (Uzbekistan)

7 October Friendly	South Korea	5–1	Uzbekistan	Seoul, South Korea
17:30 KST (UTC+09)	Kim Tae-hwan 2'; Yun Il-lok 16'; Park Jong-woo 33'; Baek Sung-dong 61'; Park Yong-ji 67'		Abdukhaliqov 55'	Stadium: Seoul World Cup Stadium; Attendance: 33,225; Referee: Apisit Aonrak (Thailand)

23 November 2012 Summer Olympics (Qualification)	Qatar	1–1	South Korea	Doha, Qatar
19:00 UTC+03	Majid 43' (pen.)	Report	Kim Hyun-sung 68'	Stadium: Al-Sadd Stadium; Attendance: 5,051; Referee: Nawaf Shukralla (Bahrain)

27 November 2012 Summer Olympics (Qualification)	South Korea	1–0	Saudi Arabia	Seoul, South Korea
14:00 KST (UTC+09)	Cho Young-cheol 33' (pen.)	Report		Stadium: Seoul World Cup Stadium; Attendance: 27,224; Referee: Yuichi Nishimura (Japan)

=== 2012 ===
5 February 2012 Summer Olympics (Qualification)	Saudi Arabia	1–1	South Korea	Dammam, Saudi Arabia
20:35 UTC+03	Khudari 60'	Report	Kim Bo-kyung 90+1'	Stadium: Prince Mohamed bin Fahd Stadium; Attendance: 1,315; Referee: Ben Williams (Australia)

22 February 2012 Summer Olympics (Qualification)	Oman	0–3	South Korea	Muscat, Oman
18:30 UTC+04		Report	Nam Tae-hee 1'; Kim Hyun-sung 68'; Baek Sung-dong 72'	Stadium: Sultan Qaboos Sports Complex; Attendance: 10,000; Referee: Alireza Faghani (Iran)

14 March 2012 Summer Olympics (Qualification)	South Korea	0–0	Qatar	Seoul, South Korea
20:00 UTC+09		Report		Stadium: Seoul World Cup Stadium; Attendance: 23,327; Referee: Valentin Kovalenko (Uzbekistan)

7 June Friendly	South Korea	3–1	Syria	Hwaseong, South Korea
20:00 UTC+09	Kim Ki-hee 33', 60'; Yun Il-lok 45'	Report	Salem 52'	Stadium: Hwaseong Stadium; Attendance: 33,853명; Referee: Chaiya Mahapab (Thailand)

23 June 2013 AFC U-22 Championship (Qualification)	Malaysia	2–3	South Korea	Yangon, Myanmar
15:15 MST (UTC+09)	Arasu 8', 62'	Report	Kim Hyun-hun 13'; Park Kwang-il 32'; Jeong Jong-hee 34'	Stadium: Thuwunna Stadium, Yangon; Attendance: 1,500; Referee: Ali Sabbagh (Lebanon)

25 June 2013 AFC U-22 Championship (Qualification)	South Korea	8–1	Chinese Taipei	Yangon, Myanmar
15:15 MST (UTC+09)	Park Jong-oh 5'; Park Yong-ji 10'; Hwang Ui-jo 17', 35'; Jung Seok-hwa 26', 80'; Kang Jong-guk 89'; Jwa Joon-hyeop 90+3' (pen.)	Report	Li Mau 31'	Stadium: Thuwunna Stadium, Yangon; Attendance: 6,500; Referee: Jameel Juma Abdulhusain (Bahrain)

28 June 2013 AFC U-22 Championship (Qualification)	South Korea	0–0	Myanmar	Yangon, Myanmar
18:15 MST (UTC+09)		Report		Stadium: Thuwunna Stadium, Yangon; Attendance: 20,000; Referee: Jumpei Iida (Japan)

30 June 2013 AFC U-22 Championship (Qualification)	Philippines	0–10	South Korea	Yangon, Myanmar
18:15 MST (UTC+09)		Report	Jeong Jong-hee 16', 83'; Hwang Ui-jo 23', 31'; Lee Jae-sung 28'; Jwa Joon-hyeop 34', 35'; Choi Ji-hoon 41'; Jeon Byung-soo 76', 90+1'	Stadium: Thuwunna Stadium, Yangon; Attendance: 100; Referee: Jameel Juma Abdulhusain (Bahrain)

3 July 2013 AFC U-22 Championship (Qualification)	South Korea	2–0	Vietnam	Yangon, Myanmar
15:15 MST (UTC+09)	Park Yong-ji 28'; Jeong Jong-hee 45+2'	Report		Stadium: Bogyoke Aung San Stadium, Yangon; Attendance: 50; Referee: Jumpei Iida (Japan)

14 July Friendly	South Korea	2–1	New Zealand	Seoul, South Korea
18:00 UTC+09	Park Chu-young 18'; Nam Tae-hee 82'	Report	Smeltz 72'	Stadium: Seoul World Cup Stadium, Suwon; Attendance: 31,655명; Referee: Valentin Kovalenko (Uzbekistan)

20 July Friendly	South Korea	3–0	Senegal	Stevenage, United Kingdom
	Ki Sung-yueng 3'; Park Chu-young 6'; Koo Ja-cheol 31'	Report		Stadium: Broadhall Way, Stevenage; Attendance: 300; Referee: Gavin Ward (England)

26 July 2012 Summer Olympics (Group B)	Mexico	0–0	South Korea	Newcastle, United Kingdom
14:30 GMT		Report		Stadium: St James' Park; Attendance: 15,748; Referee: Slim Jedidi (Tunisia)

29 July 2012 Summer Olympics (Group B)	South Korea	2–1	Switzerland	Coventry, United Kingdom
17:15 GMT	Park Chu-young 57'; Kim Bo-kyung 64'	Report	Emeghara 60'	Stadium: City of Coventry Stadium; Attendance: 30,114; Referee: Raúl Orosco (Bolivia)

1 August 2012 Summer Olympics (Group B)	South Korea	0–0	Gabon	London, United Kingdom
17:00 GMT		Report		Stadium: Wembley Stadium; Attendance: 76,927; Referee: Pavel Královec (Czech Republic)

4 August 2012 Summer Olympics (Quarter-finals)	Great Britain	1–1 (a.e.t.) (4–5 p)	South Korea	Cardiff, United Kingdom
14:30 GMT	Ramsey 36' (pen.)	Report	Ji Dong-won 29'	Stadium: Millennium Stadium, Cardiff; Attendance: 70,171; Referee: Wilmar Roldán (Colombia)
	Penalties
	Ramsey (penalty scored); Cleverley (penalty scored); Dawson (penalty scored); Giggs (penalty scored); Sturridge (penalty missed)		(penalty scored) Koo Ja-cheol; (penalty scored) Baek Sung-dong; (penalty scored) Hwang Seok-ho; (penalty scored) Park Jong-woo; (penalty scored) Ki Sung-yueng

7 August 2012 Summer Olympics (Semi-finals)	South Korea	0–3	Brazil	Manchester, United Kingdom
14:30 GMT		Report	Monteiro 39'; Damião 57', 64'	Stadium: Old Trafford, Manchester; Attendance: 69,389; Referee: Pavel Královec (Czech Republic)

10 August 2012 Summer Olympics (Bronze medal match)	Japan	0–2	South Korea	Cardiff, United Kingdom
14:30 GMT		Report	Park Chu-young 39'; Koo Ja-cheol 57'	Stadium: Millennium Stadium, Cardiff; Attendance: 56,393; Referee: Ravshan Irmatov (Uzbekistan)

8 December Friendly	China	2–1	South Korea	Wuhan, China
15:30 CST (UTC+08)	Yang Yihu 10'; Zhang Xizhe 90+1' (pen.)	Report	Choe Ji-hoon 25'	Stadium: Wuhan Sports Center Stadium, Wuhan; Attendance: 8,796; Referee: Fan Qi (China PR)

11 December Friendly	China	0–1	South Korea	Hefei, China
19:35 CST (UTC+08)		Report	Jung Seok-hwa 82'	Stadium: Hefei Olympic Sports Center Stadium, Hefei; Attendance: 11,298; Referee: Zhenlu Shi (China PR)

=== 2013 ===
29 December Friendly	Iran	3–2	South Korea	Kish, Iran
17:30 IRST (UTC+3:30)	Y. Karimi 7'; Sadeghian 9'; K. Rezaei 90'	Report	Lee Jong-ho 12', 74'	Stadium: Kish Stadium, Kish; Referee: Moud Bonyadifar (Iran)

=== 2014 ===
11 January 2013 AFC U-22 Championship (Group A)	South Korea	1–1	Jordan	Muscat, Oman
17:00 GST (UTC+04:00)	Lim Chang-woo 43'	Report	Lim Chang-woo 31' (o.g.)	Stadium: Royal Oman Police Stadium, Muscat; Attendance: 400; Referee: Mohd Amirul Izwan (Malaysia)

13 January 2013 AFC U-22 Championship (Group A)	Myanmar	0–3	South Korea	Muscat, Oman
17:00 GST (UTC+04:00)		Report	Baek Sung-dong 32'; Yun Il-lok 61'; Moon Chang-jin 78'	Stadium: Royal Oman Police Stadium, Muscat; Attendance: 103; Referee: Mohanad Qasim Eesee Sarray (Iraq)

15 January 2013 AFC U-22 Championship (Group A)	Oman	0–2	South Korea	Muscat, Oman
20:00 GST (UTC+04:00)		Report	Kim Kyung-jung 62'; Yun Il-lok 80'	Stadium: Sultan Qaboos Sports Complex, Muscat; Attendance: 6,000; Referee: Ma Ning (China PR)

19 January 2013 AFC U-22 Championship (Quarter-finals)	Syria	1–2	South Korea	Seeb, Oman
17:00 GST (UTC+04:00)	Mardikian 90+5'	Report	Baek Sung-dong 3'; Hwang Ui-jo 11'	Stadium: Seeb Stadium, Seeb; Attendance: 300; Referee: Hettikamkanamge Perera (Sri Lanka)

23 January 2013 AFC U-22 Championship (Semi-finals)	South Korea	0–1	Iraq	Seeb, Oman
17:00 GST (UTC+04:00)		Report	Nadhim 74'	Stadium: Seeb Stadium, Seeb; Attendance: 2,600; Referee: Muhammad Taqi Aljaafari Bin Jahari (Singapore)

25 January 2013 AFC U-22 Championship (Third place match)	Jordan	0–0 (a.e.t.) (3–2 p)	South Korea	Seeb, Oman
19:30 GST (UTC+04:00)		Report		Stadium: Seeb Stadium, Seeb; Attendance: 337; Referee: Yaqoob Abdul Baki (Oman)
	Penalties
	Al-Dardour (penalty scored); Zahran (penalty scored); Al-Khawaldeh (penalty missed); Abu Amarah (penalty scored)		(penalty missed) Baek Sung-dong; (penalty missed) Moon Chang-jin; (penalty scored) Nam Seung-woo; (penalty scored) Lim Chang-woo; (penalty missed) Yun Il-lok

22 May 2014 Toulon Tournament	Brazil	2–0	South Korea	Toulon, France
17:15 CEST	Thalles 27'; Luan 80+1'	Report		Stadium: Stade Léo-Lagrange, Toulon; Attendance: 2,000; Referee: Jérôme Efong Nzolo (Belgium)

28 May 2014 Toulon Tournament	England	1–1	South Korea	Aubagne, France
19:30 CEST	Woodrow 3'	Report	Lee Chang-min 55'	Stadium: Stade de Lattre-de-Tassigny, Aubagne; Attendance: 500; Referee: Eduardo Gamboa (Chile)

14 September 2014 Asian Games (Group A)	South Korea	3–0	Malaysia	Incheon, South Korea
17:00 KST (UTC+09)	Rim Chang-woo 27'; Kim Shin-wook 78'; Kim Seung-dae 82'	Report		Stadium: Incheon Munhak Stadium, Incheon; Attendance: 38,500; Referee: Abdullah Balideh (QAT)

17 September 2014 Asian Games (Group A)	South Korea	1–0	Saudi Arabia	Ansan, South Korea
20:00 KST (UTC+09)	Kim Seung-dae 12'	Report		Stadium: Ansan Wa~ Stadium, Ansan; Attendance: 23,850; Referee: Ma Ning (China PR)

21 September 2014 Asian Games (Group A)	Laos	0–2	South Korea	Hwaseong City, South Korea
17:00 KST (UTC+09)		Report	Lee Jong-ho 42'; Kim Seung-dae 89'	Stadium: Hwaseong Stadium, Hwaseong City; Attendance: 21,272; Referee: Ma Ning (China PR)

25 September 2014 Asian Games (Round of 16)	South Korea	3–0	Hong Kong	Goyang City, South Korea
20:00 KST (UTC+09)	Lee Yong-jae 59'; Park Joo-ho 76'; Kim Jin-su 90+3'	Report		Stadium: Goyang Stadium, Goyang City; Attendance: 17,962; Referee: Mohamed Al Zarouni (UAE)

28 September 2014 Asian Games (Quarter-finals)	South Korea	1–0	Japan	Incheon, South Korea
17:00 KST (UTC+09)	Jang Hyun-soo 88' (pen.)	Report		Stadium: Incheon Munhak Stadium, Incheon; Attendance: 43,221; Referee: Marai Al Awaji (Saudi Arabia)

30 September 2014 Asian Games (Semi-finals)	South Korea	2–0	Thailand	Incheon, South Korea
20:00 KST (UTC+09)	Lee Jong-ho 41'; Jang Hyun-soo 45+1' (pen.)	Report		Stadium: Incheon Munhak Stadium, Incheon; Attendance: 23,555; Referee: Mohamed Al Zarouni (UAE)

2 October 2014 Asian Games (Final)	South Korea	1–0 (a.e.t.)	North Korea	Incheon, South Korea
20:00 KST (UTC+09)	Rim Chang-woo 120+1'	Report		Stadium: Incheon Munhak Stadium, Incheon; Attendance: 47,121; Referee: Abdullah Balideh (QAT)

14 November 4 Nations Tournament	China	1–1	South Korea	Wuhan, China
19:30 CST (UTC+08)	Wu Xinghan 54'		Lee Yeong-jae 45'	Stadium: Wuhan Sports Center Stadium, Wuhan; Attendance: 2,693; Referee: Sivakorn Pu-Udom (THA)

16 November 4 Nations Tournament	South Korea	0–3	Brazil	Wuhan, China
16:00 CST (UTC+08)			Felipe Anderson 39'; Rayder Matos 41'; Felipe Gedoz 90'	Stadium: Wuhan Sports Center Stadium, Wuhan; Referee: Shen Yinhao (China PR)

18 November 4 Nations Tournament	South Korea	0–1	Australia	Wuhan, China
16:00 CST (UTC+08)			Ugarković 36'	Stadium: Wuhan Sports Center Stadium, Wuhan; Attendance: 537; Referee: Fu Ming (China PR)

=== 2015 ===
1 February 2015 King's Cup	South Korea	1–0	Uzbekistan	Nakhon Ratchasima, Thailand
16:00 TST (UTC+07)	Song Ju-hun 23'			Stadium: 80th Birthday Stadium, Nakhon Ratchasima; Attendance: 3,000; Referee: Sivakorn Pu-Udom (THA)

27 March 2016 AFC U-23 Championship (Qualification)	South Korea	5–0	Brunei	Central Jakarta, Indonesia
17:30 WIB (UTC+07)	Lee Yeong-jae 3'; Jung Seung-hyun 29'; Kim Hyun 39' (pen.); Kwon Chang-hoon 57' (pen.); Jang Hyun-soo 76'	Report		Stadium: Gelora Bung Karno Stadium, Central Jakarta; Attendance: 600; Referee: Jumpei Iida (JPN)

29 March 2016 AFC U-23 Championship (Qualification)	Timor-Leste	0–3	South Korea	Central Jakarta, Indonesia
19:00 WIB (UTC+07)		Report	Moon Chang-jin 17' (pen.), 47', 74'; Kim Seung-jun 44'	Stadium: Gelora Bung Karno Stadium, Central Jakarta; Attendance: 555; Referee: Sivakorn Pu-Udom (THA)

31 March 2016 AFC U-23 Championship (Qualification)	South Korea	4–0	Indonesia	Central Jakarta, Indonesia
15:30 WIB (UTC+07)	Jung Seung-hyun 52'; Lee Chan-dong 71'; Kim Seung-jun 83'; Lee Chang-min 87'	Report		Stadium: Gelora Bung Karno Stadium, Central Jakarta; Attendance: 16,422; Referee: Mohammed Abdulla Hassan Mohamed (UAE)

9 May Friendly	Vietnam	0–0	South Korea	Hanoi, Vietnam
19:00 VST (UTC+07)		Report		Stadium: Mỹ Đình National Stadium; Referee: Suhaizi Shukri (Malaysia)

13 May Friendly	Cambodia	0–1	South Korea	Ho Chi Minh City, Vietnam
15:00 VST (UTC+07)		Report	Lee Yeong-jae 50'	Stadium: Thống Nhất Stadium

11 June Friendly	France	1–1	South Korea	Gueugnon, France
21:00 CEST (UTC+02)	Haller 29'	Report	Moon Chang-jin 62'	Stadium: Stade Jean Laville; Attendance: 8,000; Referee: Padraigh Sutton (Republic of Ireland)

14 June Friendly	Tunisia	0–2	South Korea	Tunis, Tunisia
18:00 CET (UTC+01)		Report	Moon Chang-jin 37'; Saidani 60' (o.g.)	Stadium: Stade El Menzah; Attendance: 200

9 October Friendly	South Korea	2–0	Australia	Hwaseong, South Korea
17:10 KST (UTC+09)	Ji Eon-hak 8'; Yeon Jei-min 27'	Report		Stadium: Hwaseong Stadium; Attendance: 8,561; Referee: Võ Minh Trí (Vietnam)

12 October Friendly	South Korea	2–1	Australia	Icheon, South Korea
19:00 KST (UTC+09)	Ryu Seung-woo 49'; Lennox 82' (o.g.)	Report	Hoole 88'	Stadium: Icheon City Stadium; Attendance: 19,100; Referee: Sivakorn Pu-Udom (Thailand)

11 November 4 Nations Tournament	Morocco	1–0	South Korea	Wuhan, China
16:00 CST (UTC+08)	Achahbar 28'	Report		Stadium: Wuhan Sports Center Stadium, Wuhan; Referee: Zhou Gang (China)

13 November 4 Nations Tournament	Colombia	2–2	South Korea	Wuhan, China
16:00 CST (UTC+08)	Nieto 68'; Martínez 81'	Report	Ji Eon-hak 17'; Park Yong-woo 37'	Stadium: Wuhan Sports Center Stadium, Wuhan; Referee: Fan Qi (China)

15 November 4 Nations Tournament	China	1–1	South Korea	Wuhan, China
19:30 CST (UTC+08)	Mi Haolun 85'	Report	Park Yong-woo 76'	Stadium: Wuhan Sports Center Stadium, Wuhan; Referee: Võ Minh Trí (Vietnam)

=== 2016 ===
4 January Friendly	United Arab Emirates	0–2	South Korea	Dubai, United Arab Emirates
18:20 AST (UTC+03)		Report	Lee Yeong-jae 61'; Hwang Hee-chan 88'	Stadium: Maktoum Bin Rashid Al Maktoum Stadium; Attendance: 400; Referee: Sultan Al Razaq (UAE)

7 January Friendly	Saudi Arabia	0–0	South Korea	Dubai, United Arab Emirates
18:20 AST (UTC+03)		Report		Stadium: Maktoum Bin Rashid Al Maktoum Stadium; Attendance: 350; Referee: Sultan Mohamed Saleh (UAE)

13 January 2016 AFC U-23 Championship (Group C)	South Korea	2–1	Uzbekistan	Doha, Qatar
19:30 AST (UTC+03)	Moon Chang-jin 20' (pen.), 48'	Report	Dostonbek Khamdamov 57'	Stadium: Suheim Bin Hamad Stadium; Attendance: 803; Referee: Fahad Al-Mirdasi (KSA)

16 January 2016 AFC U-23 Championship (Group C)	Yemen	0–5	South Korea	Doha, Qatar
16:30 AST (UTC+03)		Report	Kwon Chang-hoon 14', 31', 41'; Ryu Seung-woo 72'; Kim Seung-jun 76'	Stadium: Suheim Bin Hamad Stadium; Attendance: 686; Referee: Dmitriy Mashentsev (KGZ)

19 January 2016 AFC U-23 Championship (Group C)	Iraq	1–1	South Korea	Doha, Qatar
19:30 AST (UTC+03)	Walid 90+2'	Report	Kim Hyun 22'	Stadium: Suheim Bin Hamad Stadium; Attendance: 1,086; Referee: Abdulrahman Al-Jassim (QAT)

23 January 2016 AFC U-23 Championship (Quarter-finals)	South Korea	1–0	Jordan	Doha, Qatar
16:30 AST (UTC+03)	Moon Chang-jin 23'	Report		Stadium: Suheim Bin Hamad Stadium; Attendance: 3,126; Referee: Alireza Faghani (IRN)

26 January 2016 AFC U-23 Championship (Semi-finals)	Qatar	1–3	South Korea	Doha, Qatar
19:30 AST (UTC+03)	Alaa 79'	Report	Ryu Seung-woo 48'; Kwon Chang-hoon 89'; Moon Chang-jin 90+4'	Stadium: Jassim Bin Hamad Stadium; Attendance: 11,840; Referee: Crishantha Dilan Perera (SRI)

30 January 2016 AFC U-23 Championship (Final)	South Korea	2–3	Japan	Doha, Qatar
17:45 AST (UTC+03)	Kwon Chang-hoon 20'; Jin Seong-uk 47'	Report	Asano 66', 81'; Yajima 68'	Stadium: Abdullah bin Khalifa Stadium; Attendance: 5,394; Referee: Abdulrahman Al-Jassim (QAT)

25 March Friendly	South Korea	2–0	Algeria	Icheon, South Korea
20:00 KST (UTC+09)	Kwon Chang-hoon 3'; Moon Chang-jin 30'	Report		Stadium: Icheon Stadium; Attendance: 11,752; Referee: Chen Hsin-chuan (Chinese Taipei)

28 March Friendly	South Korea	3–0	Algeria	Goyang, South Korea
19:00 KST (UTC+09)	Lee Chang-min 22'; Moon Chang-jin 59', 75'	Report		Stadium: Goyang Stadium; Attendance: 14,357; Referee: Ali Abdulnabi (Bahamas)

2 June 4 Nations Tournament	South Korea	1–0	Nigeria	Suwon, South Korea
20:00 KST (UTC+09)	Choi Kyu-baek 86'	Report		Stadium: Suwon World Cup Stadium; Attendance: 7,627; Referee: Masaaki Toma (Japan)

4 June 4 Nations Tournament	South Korea	2–2	Honduras	Goyang, South Korea
13:30 KST (UTC+09)	Kim Hyun 35'; Park In-hyeok 93'	Report	Lozano 22', 42'	Stadium: Goyang Stadium; Attendance: 4,315; Referee: Wang Di (China)

6 June 4 Nations Tournament	South Korea	1–1	Denmark	Bucheon, South Korea
20:00 KST (UTC+09)	Moon Chang-jin 40'	Report	Brock-Madsen 92'	Stadium: Bucheon Stadium; Attendance: 13,690; Referee: Masaaki Toma (Japan)

30 July Friendly	South Korea	3–2	Sweden	São Paulo, Brazil
20:00 UTC−2	Moon Chang-jin 38', 41'; Ryu Seung-woo 54'	Report	Sema 26'; Une Larsson 57'	Stadium: Pacaembu Stadium; Attendance: 11,256; Referee: Raphael Claus (Brazil)

4 August 2016 Summer Olympics (Group C)	Fiji	0–8	South Korea	Salvador, Brazil
17:00 UTC−3		Report (Rio2016); Report (FIFA)	Ryu Seung-woo 32', 63', 90+3'; Kwon Chang-hoon 62', 63'; Son Heung-min 72' (pen.); Suk Hyun-jun 77', 90'	Stadium: Itaipava Arena Fonte Nova; Attendance: 16,000; Referee: Malang Diedhiou (Senegal)

7 August 2016 Summer Olympics (Group C)	Germany	3–3	South Korea	Salvador, Brazil
16:00 UTC−3	Gnabry 33', 90+2'; Selke 55'	Report (Rio2016); Report (FIFA)	Hwang Hee-chan 25'; Son Heung-min 57'; Suk Hyun-jun 87'	Stadium: Itaipava Arena Fonte Nova; Referee: Néstor Pitana (Argentina)

10 August 2016 Summer Olympics (Group C)	South Korea	1–0	Mexico	Brasília, Brazil
16:00 UTC−3	Kwon Chang-hoon 73'	Report (Rio2016); Report (FIFA)		Stadium: Estádio Nacional Mané Garrincha

13 August 2016 Summer Olympics (Quarter-finals)	South Korea	0–1	Honduras	Belo Horizonte, Brazil
19:00 UTC−3		Report (Rio2016); Report (FIFA)	Elis 59'	Stadium: Mineirão; Attendance: 36,704; Referee: Gehad Grisha (Egypt)

=== 2017 ===
19 July 2018 AFC U-23 Championship (Qualification)	South Korea	10–0	Macau	Ho Chi Minh City, Vietnam
16:00 (UTC+7)	Cho Young-wook 10', 14', 25', 55'; Hwang In-beom 29'; Doo Hyeon-seok 48'; Park Seong-bu 53' (pen.), 78'; Jo Sung-wook 64'; Park Jae-woo 90+3'	Report		Stadium: Thống Nhất Stadium; Attendance: 1,000; Referee: Aziz Asimov (Uzbekistan)

21 July 2018 AFC U-23 Championship (Qualification)	Timor-Leste	0–0	South Korea	Ho Chi Minh City, Vietnam
16:00 (UTC+7)		Report		Stadium: Thống Nhất Stadium; Attendance: 2,500; Referee: Khurram Shahzad (Pakistan)

23 July 2018 AFC U-23 Championship (Qualification)	South Korea	2–1	Vietnam	Ho Chi Minh City, Vietnam
19:00 (UTC+7)	Lee Sang-heon 19'; Hwang In-beom 41'	Report	Công Phượng 33'	Stadium: Thống Nhất Stadium; Attendance: 18,000; Referee: Masoud Tufayelieh (Syria)

=== 2018 ===
11 January 2018 AFC U-23 Championship (Group D)	South Korea	2–1	Vietnam	Kunshan, China
19:30 (UTC+8)	Cho Young-wook 29'; Lee Keun-ho 73'	Report	Quang Hải 17'	Stadium: Kunshan Stadium; Attendance: 766; Referee: Turki Al-Khudhayr (Saudi Arabia)

14 January 2018 AFC U-23 Championship (Group D)	Syria	0–0	South Korea	Kunshan, China
19:30 (UTC+8)		Report		Stadium: Kunshan Stadium; Attendance: 685; Referee: Ravshan Irmatov (Uzbekistan)

17 January 2018 AFC U-23 Championship (Group D)	South Korea	3–2	Australia	Kunshan, China
19:30 (UTC+8)	Lee Keun-ho 18', 65'; Han Seung-gyu 44'	Report	Cowburn 72'; Buhagiar 76'	Stadium: Kunshan Stadium; Attendance: 678; Referee: Abdulrahman Al-Jassim (Qatar)

20 January 2018 AFC U-23 Championship (Quarter-finals)	South Korea	2–1	Malaysia	Kunshan, China
16:00 (UTC+8)	Cho Jae-wan 1'; Han Seung-gyu 85'	Report	Thanabalan 67'	Stadium: Kunshan Stadium; Attendance: 738; Referee: Adham Makhadmeh (Jordan)

23 January 2018 AFC U-23 Championship (Semi-finals)	Uzbekistan	4–1 (a.e.t.)	South Korea	Kunshan, China
19:30 (UTC+8)	Urinboev 33'; Ganiev 99'; Yakhshiboev 110'; Komilov 120+1'	Report	Hwang Hyun-soo 58'	Stadium: Kunshan Stadium; Attendance: 367; Referee: Turki Al-Khudhayr (Saudi Arabia)

26 January 2018 AFC U-23 Championship (Third place match)	Qatar	1–0	South Korea	Kunshan, China
19:30 (UTC+8)	Afif 39'	Report		Stadium: Kunshan Stadium; Attendance: 168; Referee: Adham Makhadmeh (Jordan)

23 June Friendly	Indonesia	1–2	South Korea	Cibinong, Indonesia
(UTC+7)	Hansamu 90+4'	Report	Jeong Tae-wook 43'; Han Seung-gyu 90+5'	Stadium: Pakansari Stadium

15 August 2018 Asian Games (Group E)	South Korea	6–0	Bahrain	Soreang, Indonesia
19:00 (UTC+7)	Hwang Ui-jo 17', 36', 43'; Kim Jin-ya 23'; Na Sang-ho 41'; Hwang Hee-chan 90+3'	Report		Stadium: Jalak Harupat Stadium; Referee: Takuto Okabe (Japan)

17 August 2018 Asian Games (Group E)	Malaysia	2–1	South Korea	Soreang, Indonesia
19:00 (UTC+7)	Safawi 5', 45+1'	Report	Hwang Ui-jo 87'	Stadium: Jalak Harupat Stadium; Referee: Mohammed Al-Hoish (Saudi Arabia)

20 August 2018 Asian Games (Group E)	South Korea	1–0	Kyrgyzstan	Soreang, Indonesia
19:00 (UTC+7)	Son Heung-min 63'	Report		Stadium: Jalak Harupat Stadium; Referee: Masoud Tufaylieh (Syria)

23 August 2018 Asian Games (Round of 16)	Iran	0–2	South Korea	Cikarang, Indonesia
19:30 (UTC+7)		Report	Hwang Ui-jo 40'; Lee Seung-woo 55'	Stadium: Wibawa Mukti Stadium; Referee: Ahmad Yacoub Ibrahim (Jordan)

27 August 2018 Asian Games (Quarter-finals)	Uzbekistan	3–4 (a.e.t.)	South Korea	Bekasi, Indonesia
16:00 (UTC+7)	Masharipov 17'; Alibaev 53'; Hwang Hyun-soo 55' (o.g.)	Report	Hwang Ui-jo 4', 34', 75'; Hwang Hee-chan 118' (pen.)	Stadium: Patriot Candrabhaga Stadium; Referee: Mohammed Al-Hoish (Saudi Arabia)

29 August 2018 Asian Games (Semi-finals)	Vietnam	1–3	South Korea	Cibinong, Indonesia
16:00 (UTC+7)	Minh Vương 70'	Report	Lee Seung-woo 7', 55'; Hwang Ui-jo 28'	Stadium: Pakansari Stadium; Referee: Masoud Tufaylieh (Syria)

1 September 2018 Asian Games (Final)	South Korea	2–1 (a.e.t.)	Japan	Cibinong, Indonesia
18:30 (UTC+7)	Lee Seung-woo 93'; Hwang Hee-chan 101'	Report	Ueda 115'	Stadium: Pakansari Stadium; Referee: Aziz Asimov (Uzbekistan)

=== 2019 ===
22 March 2020 AFC U-23 Championship (Qualification)	South Korea	8–0	Chinese Taipei	Phnom Penh, Cambodia
17:00 (UTC+7)	Lee Dong-jun 14' (pen.), 33'; Seo Gyeong-ju 39'; Lee Si-heon 68'; Cho Young-wook 69'; Lee Dong-gyeong 72', 73', 85'	Report		Stadium: Phnom Penh Olympic Stadium; Attendance: 1,113; Referee: Sultan Al-Marzooqi (United Arab Emirates)

24 March 2020 AFC U-23 Championship (Qualification)	Cambodia	1–6	South Korea	Phnom Penh, Cambodia
20:00 (UTC+7)	N. Kakada 60'	Report	Han Chan-hee 4'; Jang Min-gyu 8'; Kim Bo-sub 57'; Sovann 80' (o.g.); Lee Dong-gyeong 84', 90+3'	Stadium: Phnom Penh Olympic Stadium; Attendance: 1,328; Referee: Mohammed Al-Hoish (Saudi Arabia)

26 March 2020 AFC U-23 Championship (Qualification)	South Korea	2–2	Australia	Phnom Penh, Cambodia
17:00 (UTC+7)	Cho Young-wook 26'; Lee Dong-gyeong 63'	Report	D'Agostino 16', 24'	Stadium: Phnom Penh Olympic Stadium; Attendance: 455; Referee: Yaqoob Abdul Baki (Oman)

11 October Friendly	South Korea	3–1	Uzbekistan	Hwaseong, South Korea
20:35 (UTC+9)	Kim Jae-woo 37'; Oh Se-hun 71'; Kim Jin-kyu 75'	Report	Yakhshiboev 20'	Stadium: Hwaseong Stadium; Attendance: 6,539; Referee: Yin Hao Shen (China)

14 October Friendly	South Korea	1–2	Uzbekistan	Cheonan, South Korea
20:00 (UTC+9)	Jeong Woo-yeong 30'	Report	Abdixolikov 49'; Yakhshiboev 81'	Stadium: Cheonan Baekseok Stadium; Attendance: 7,305; Referee: Liu Kwok Man (Hong Kong)

13 November Dubai Cup	South Korea	2–0	Saudi Arabia	Dubai, United Arab Emirates
16:00 (UTC+4)	Lee Dong-jun 55'; Cho Gue-sung 77'	Report

15 November Dubai Cup	South Korea	3–0	Bahrain	Dubai, United Arab Emirates
16:00 (UTC+4)	Oh Se-hun 48', 56'; Kim Dae-won 90+5'	Report

17 November Dubai Cup	South Korea	3–3	Iraq	Dubai, United Arab Emirates
16:00 (UTC+4)	Jarir 45' (o.g.); Kim Dae-won 56'; Lee Dong-jun 80'	Report	Lee Sang-min 72' (o.g.); Al-Ammari 90' (pen.); Nassif 95+5' (pen.)

19 November Dubai Cup	United Arab Emirates	1–1	South Korea	Dubai, United Arab Emirates
16:00 (UTC+4)	Jumaa 45+3'	Report	Nasser 47' (o.g.)

== Other matches ==
15 January 2012 2012 King's Cup	Thailand A	1–3	South Korea	Nakhon Ratchasima, Thailand
19:00 TST (UTC+07)	Teerathep 53'	Report	Kim Dong-sub 42'; Seo Jung-jin 69'; Kim Hyun-sung 79'	Stadium: 80th Birthday Stadium, Nakhon Ratchasima; Attendance: 11,000; Referee: Yudai Yamamoto (JPN)

18 January 2012 2012 King's Cup	South Korea	0–0	Denmark XI	Nakhon Ratchasima, Thailand
16:10 TST (UTC+07)		Report		Stadium: 80th Birthday Stadium, Nakhon Ratchasima; Attendance: 150; Referee: Prathan Nasa Wang (THA)

21 January 2012 2012 King's Cup	Norway A	0–3	South Korea	Nakhon Ratchasima, Thailand
16:10 TST (UTC+07)		Report	Kim Bo-kyung 18' (pen.); Kim Hyun-sung 21'; Seo Jung-jin 59'	Stadium: 80th Birthday Stadium, Nakhon Ratchasima; Attendance: 400; Referee: Chaiya Mahapab (THA)

24 May 2014 2014 Toulon Tournament	South Korea	1–1	Qatar U20	Hyères, France
15:45 CEST	Shin Il-soo 19'	Report	Doozandeh 61' (pen.)	Stadium: Stade Perruc, Hyères; Attendance: 600; Referee: Eduardo Gamboa (Chile)

26 May 2014 2014 Toulon Tournament	Colombia U20	0–1	South Korea	Saint-Raphaël, France
17:15 CEST		Report	Moon Chang-jin 68' (pen.)	Stadium: Stade Louis Hon, Saint-Raphaël; Attendance: 600; Referee: José Alfredo Peñaloza (Mexico)

1 June 2014 Friendly	South Korea	2–1	Kuwait A	Incheon, South Korea
16:00 KST (UTC+09)	Kim Seung-dae 19'; Jang Hyun-soo 90+4' (pen.)		Alhajeri 39'	Stadium: Incheon Asiad Main Stadium, Incheon; Attendance: 51,000; Referee: Hiroyuki Kimura (Japan)

4 February 2015 2015 King's Cup	Honduras U20	0–2	South Korea	Nakhon Ratchasima, Thailand
16:00 TST (UTC+07)			Lee Chang-min 26'; Lee Woo-hyeok 83'	Stadium: 80th Birthday Stadium, Nakhon Ratchasima; Attendance: 1,000; Referee: Alongkorn Feemuechang (THA)

7 February 2015 2015 King's Cup	Thailand A	0–0	South Korea	Nakhon Ratchasima, Thailand
19:00 TST (UTC+07)				Stadium: 80th Birthday Stadium, Nakhon Ratchasima; Attendance: 20,000; Referee: Phung Dinh Dung (VIE)

== See also ==
- South Korea national under-23 football team results
