= Hà Đức Chinh =

Vietnamese footballer (born 1997)

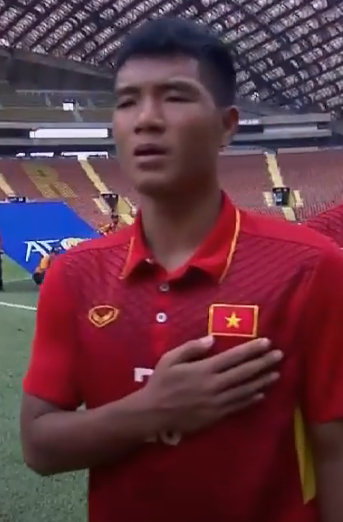
- Đức Chinh in 2017

Personal information
- Full name: Hà Đức Chinh
- Date of birth: 22 September 1997 (age 29)
- Place of birth: Tân Sơn, Phú Thọ, Vietnam
- Height: 1.74 m (5 ft 9 in)
- Position: Striker

Team information
- Current team: Becamex Hồ Chí Minh City
- Number: 9

Youth career
- 2009–2015: PVF Football Academy

Senior career*
Years	Team	Apps	(Gls)
2016	→ Than Quảng Ninh (loan)	2	(0)
2016	→ Hồ Chí Minh City (loan)	18	(0)
2017–2022	SHB Đà Nẵng	97	(23)
2022–2024	Quy Nhơn Bình Định	51	(3)
2024–2025	Becamex Bình Dương	12	(2)
2025–2026	Bắc Ninh	10	(1)
2026–	Becamex Hồ Chí Minh City	1	(0)

International career^{‡}
2015–2017	Vietnam U20	22	(11)
2018–2019	Vietnam U22	7	(8)
2017–2020	Vietnam U23	24	(6)
2017–2022	Vietnam	18	(0)
Medal record
Men's football
Representing Vietnam
AFC U-23 Championship
Runner-up	2018
AFF Championship
Winner	2018
SEA Games
Gold medal – first place	2019 Manila	Football
- * Club domestic league appearances and goals as of 20 September 2026 ‡ National team caps and goals as of 21 February 2026

Hà Đức Chinh (born 22 September 1997) is a Vietnamese professional footballer who plays as a striker for V.League 2 club Becamex Hồ Chí Minh City.

== International goals ==
=== U-20 ===
Scores and results list Vietnam's goal tally first.

#	Date	Venue	Opponent	Score	Result	Competition
1	27 August 2015	Vientiane, Laos	Singapore	1–0	6–0	2015 AFF U-19 Youth Championship
2	2 September 2015	Vientiane, Laos	Laos	2–0; 3–0; 4–0	4–0	2015 AFF U-19 Youth Championship
3	28 September 2015	Yangon, Myanmar	Hong Kong	1–0; 3–1	3–1	2016 AFC U-19 Championship qualification
4	6 October 2015	Yangon, Myanmar	Myanmar	1–0	1–0	2016 AFC U-19 Championship qualification
5	5 June 2016	Krubong, Malaysia	Singapore U-21	2–2	2–2	Exhibition
6	24 August 2016	Mandalay, Myanmar	Myanmar	1–0	1–1	Exhibition
7	15 September 2016	Hanoi, Vietnam	Philippines	1–0; 4–2	4–3	2016 AFF U-19 Youth Championship
8	22 September 2016	Hanoi, Vietnam	Australia	2–4	2–5	2016 AFF U-19 Youth Championship
9	24 September 2016	Hanoi, Vietnam	Timor-Leste	2–0	4–0	2016 AFF U-19 Youth Championship
10	14 October 2016	Isa Town, Bahrain	Korea DPR	1–0	2–1	2016 AFC U-19 Championship
11	10 May 2017	HCMC, Vietnam	Argentina	1–4	1–4	Exhibition

=== U-22 ===
Scores and results list Vietnam's goal tally first. Only results against national teams were counted

#	Date	Venue	Opponent	Score	Result	Competition
1.	25 November 2019	Biñan Football Stadium, Biñan, Philippines	Brunei	1–0	6–0	2019 Southeast Asian Games
2.	25 November 2019	Biñan Football Stadium, Biñan, Philippines	Brunei	2–0	6–0	2019 Southeast Asian Games
3.	25 November 2019	Biñan Football Stadium, Biñan, Philippines	Brunei	3–0	6–0	2019 Southeast Asian Games
4.	25 November 2019	Biñan Football Stadium, Biñan, Philippines	Brunei	5–0	6–0	2019 Southeast Asian Games
5.	3 December 2019	Rizal Memorial Stadium, Manila, Philippines	Singapore	1–0	1–0	2019 Southeast Asian Games
6.	7 December 2019	Rizal Memorial Stadium, Manila, Philippines	Cambodia	2–0	4–0	2019 Southeast Asian Games
7.	7 December 2019	Rizal Memorial Stadium, Manila, Philippines	Cambodia	3–0	4–0	2019 Southeast Asian Games
8.	7 December 2019	Rizal Memorial Stadium, Manila, Philippines	Cambodia	4–0	4–0	2019 Southeast Asian Games

=== U-23 ===
Scores and results list Vietnam's goal tally first. Only results against national teams were counted

#	Date	Venue	Opponent	Score	Result	Competition
1	19 July 2017	Thống Nhất Stadium, Ho Chi Minh City, Vietnam	Timor-Leste	1–0	4–0	2018 AFC U-23 Championship qualification
2	15 August 2017	Selayang Municipal Council Stadium, Selayang, Malaysia	Timor-Leste	2–0	4–0	2017 Southeast Asian Games
3.	20 January 2018	Changshu Stadium, Changshu, China	Iraq	3–2	3–3 (5–3 pen.)	2018 AFC U-23 Championship
4	22 March 2019	Mỹ Đình National Stadium, Hanoi, Vietnam	Brunei	1–0	6–0	2020 AFC U-23 Championship qualification
5	26 March 2019	Mỹ Đình National Stadium, Hanoi, Vietnam	Thailand	1–0	4–0	2020 AFC U-23 Championship qualification
6	13 October 2019	Thống Nhất Stadium, Ho Chi Minh City, Vietnam	United Arab Emirates	1–1	1–1	Exhibition

== Honours ==
Vietnam U23

- AFC U-23 Championship runners-up: 2018
- SEA Games gold medal: 2019

Vietnam

- AFF Championship: 2018
- King's Cup runners-up: 2019

Individual

- SEA Games top scorer: 2019
