= Baha' Faisal =

Jordanian footballer

Personal information
- Full name: Baha' Faisal Mohammad Seif
- Date of birth: 30 May 1995 (age 31)
- Place of birth: Zarqa, Jordan
- Height: 1.77 m (5 ft 10 in)
- Position: Striker

Team information
- Current team: Al-Waab
- Number: 20

Youth career
- Al-Wehdat

Senior career*
Years	Team	Apps	(Gls)
2013–2019	Al-Wehdat	74	(35)
2018	→ Kuwait (loan)	5	(2)
2019–2023	Al-Shamal	46	(34)
2024	Al-Wehdat		
2025–	Al-Waab		

International career^{‡}
2011–2012	Jordan U17	3	(1)
2013–2014	Jordan U19	9	(9)
2015–2018	Jordan U23	14	(11)
2016–	Jordan	59	(16)
- * Club domestic league appearances and goals as of 14 April 2023 ‡ National team caps and goals as of 27 March 2026

Baha' Faisal Mohammad Seif (Arabic: بهاء فيصل محمد سيف; born 30 May 1995) is a Jordanian footballer who plays for Qatari Second Division club Al-Waab and the Jordan national team.

== Career statistics ==
As of 13 April 2023

Club	Division	Season	League		National Cup		Second Division Cup		Qatar Federation Cup		Total	
Club	Division	Season	Apps	Goals	Apps	Goals	Apps	Goals	Apps	Goals	Apps	Goals
Al-Shamal	QSD	2019–20	17	13	0	0	3	2	0	0	20	15
Al-Shamal	QSD	2020–21	20	17	2	0	4	4	3	3	27	23
Al-Shamal	QSL	2021–22	9	4	0	0	0	0	0	0	9	4
Al-Shamal	QSL	2022–23	0	0	0	0	0	0	0	0	0	0
Al-Shamal	Total		46	34	2	0	7	6	3	3	58	43

== International career ==
Baha' played his first match with the Jordan national senior team against Bangladesh in the 2018 FIFA World Cup qualification on 24 March 2016, which resulted in an 8–0 win for Jordan.

== International goals ==
=== With U-17 ===
No.	Date	Venue	Opponent	Score	Result	Competition
1.	27 August 2012	Amman	Syria	1–0	Win	U-17 Friendly

=== With U-19 ===
No.	Date	Venue	Opponent	Score	Result	Competition
1.	22 March 2013	Amman	Lebanon	2–2	Draw	U-19 Friendly
2.	22 March 2013	Amman	Lebanon	2–2	Draw	U-19 Friendly
3.	24 March 2013	Amman	Lebanon	1–0	Win	U-19 Friendly
4.	25 April 2013	Amman	Tunisia	4–1	Loss	U-19 Friendly
5.	27 April 2013	Amman	Tunisia	4–2	Loss	U-19 Friendly
6.	27 April 2013	Amman	Tunisia	4–2	Loss	U-19 Friendly
7.	28 September 2013	Amman	Sri Lanka	4–0	Win	U-19 Friendly
8.	8 October 2013	Amman	Afghanistan	2–1	Win	2014 AFC U-19 Championship qualification
9.	8 October 2013	Amman	Afghanistan	2–1	Win	2014 AFC U-19 Championship qualification

=== With U-23 ===
No.	Date	Venue	Opponent	Score	Result	Competition
1.	18 May 2015	Tahnoun bin Mohammed Stadium, Al Ain	Kyrgyzstan	3–0	4–0	2016 AFC U-23 Championship qualification
2.	20 May 2015	Tahnoun bin Mohammed Stadium, Al Ain	Kuwait	1–0	3–3	2016 AFC U-23 Championship qualification
3.	20 May 2015	Tahnoun bin Mohammed Stadium, Al Ain	Kuwait	2–2	3–3	2016 AFC U-23 Championship qualification
4.	20 May 2015	Tahnoun bin Mohammed Stadium, Al Ain	Kuwait	3–2	3–3	2016 AFC U-23 Championship qualification
5.	30 September 2015	Abdullah bin Khalifa Stadium, Doha	Yemen	1–0	3–1	2015 WAFF U-23 Championship
6.	14 January 2016	Suheim Bin Hamad Stadium, Doha	Vietnam	1–0	3–1	2016 AFC U-23 Championship
7.	14 January 2016	Suheim Bin Hamad Stadium, Doha	Vietnam	3–0	3–1	2016 AFC U-23 Championship
8.	19 July 2017	Dora International Stadium, Hebron	Bangladesh	5–0	7–0	2018 AFC U-23 Championship qualification
9.	23 July 2017	Dora International Stadium, Hebron	Tajikistan	2–0	2–0	2018 AFC U-23 Championship qualification
10.	10 January 2018	Changshu Stadium, Changshu	Saudi Arabia	1–0	2–2	2018 AFC U-23 Championship
11.	10 January 2018	Changshu Stadium, Changshu	Saudi Arabia	2–0	2–2	2018 AFC U-23 Championship

=== Senior team ===
Scores and results list Jordan's goal tally first.

No.	Date	Venue	Opponent	Score	Result	Competition
1.	24 March 2016	Amman International Stadium, Amman, Jordan	Bangladesh	6–0	8–0	2018 FIFA World Cup qualification
2.	31 August 2016	Camille Chamoun Sports City Stadium, Beirut, Lebanon	Lebanon	1–1	1–1	Friendly
3.	15 October 2018	Stadion Rujevica, Rijeka, Croatia	Croatia	1–2	1–2	Friendly
4.	26 March 2019	Basra Sports City, Basra, Iraq	Iraq	2–3	2–3	2019 International Friendship Championship
5.	11 June 2019	King Abdullah II Stadium, Amman, Jordan	Indonesia	1–0	4–1	Friendly
6.	5 September 2019	Taipei Municipal Stadium, Taipei, Chinese Taipei	Chinese Taipei	1–0	2–1	2022 FIFA World Cup qualification
7.	15 October 2019	Amman International Stadium, Amman, Jordan	Nepal	3–0	3–0	2022 FIFA World Cup qualification
8.	19 November 2019	King Abdullah II Stadium, Amman, Jordan	Chinese Taipei	1–0	5–0	2022 FIFA World Cup qualification
9.	19 November 2019	King Abdullah II Stadium, Amman, Jordan	Chinese Taipei	5–0	5–0	2022 FIFA World Cup qualification
10.	16 November 2020	Amman International Stadium, Amman, Jordan	Syria	1–0	1–0	Friendly
11.	30 March 2021	Bahrain National Stadium, Riffa, Bahrain	Bahrain	1–0	2–1	Friendly
12.	31 May 2021	Khalid bin Mohammed Stadium, Sharjah, United Arab Emirates	Vietnam	1–0	1–1	Friendly
13.	7 June 2021	Jaber Al-Ahmad International Stadium, Kuwait City, Kuwait	Nepal	1–0	3–0	2022 FIFA World Cup qualification
14.	7 June 2021	Jaber Al-Ahmad International Stadium, Kuwait City, Kuwait	Nepal	2–0	3–0	2022 FIFA World Cup qualification
15.	7 September 2021	Bahrain National Stadium, Riffa, Bahrain	Bahrain	2–0	2–1	Friendly
16.	12 October 2021	Amman International Stadium, Amman, Jordan	Uzbekistan	1–0	3–0	Friendly
17.	10 November 2021	Fadil Vokrri Stadium, Pristina, Kosovo	Kosovo	1–0	2–0	Friendly
18.	27 March 2026	Mardan Sports Complex, Antalya, Türkiye	Costa Rica	1–0	2–2	Friendly

=== International statistics ===
As of 7 June 2021

Jordan
Year	Apps	Goals
2016	10	2
2017	7	0
2018	10	1
2019	12	6
2020	2	1
2021	5	4
Total	46	14
