= Mohamed Darwish =

Palestinian footballer (born 1997)

Personal information
- Full name: Mohamed Osama Ali Darwish
- Date of birth: 20 February 1997 (age 29)
- Place of birth: Beit She'an, Israel
- Height: 1.77 m (5 ft 10 in)
- Position: Centre forward

Youth career
- DJK Gnadental
- Borussia Mönchengladbach
- Schalke 04
- Hannover 96

Senior career*
Years	Team	Apps	(Gls)
2016–2017	Hannover 96 II	19	(1)
2017–2019	Arminia Hannover	44	(13)
2019–2020	Hannoverscher SC	17	(0)
2020–2021	Trepça '89	26	(3)
2021–2022	Atlas Delmenhorst	6	(1)
2022	Shabab Al-Khalil		
2022	Haras El Hodoud		

International career^{‡}
2018	Palestine U23		
2015–	Palestine	5	(0)
- * Club domestic league appearances and goals as of 21 January 2022 ‡ National team caps and goals as of 3 June 2021

Mohamed Osama Ali Darwish (Arabic: محمد أسامة علي درويش; born 20 February 1997) is a Palestinian footballer who plays as a centre forward for the Palestine national team.

== Club career ==
Born in Beit She'an, Darwish began his senior career in Germany with Hannover 96 II. On 31 August 2017, Darwish joined Oberliga Niedersachsen side Arminia Hannover. Seventeen days later, he made his debut in a 2–0 home win against Eintracht Northeim after being named in the starting line-up.

He moved to Hannoverscher SC for the 2019–20 season.

On 30 August 2020, Darwish joined Football Superleague of Kosovo side Trepça '89. On 18 September 2020, he made his debut in a 0–2 home defeat against Arbëria after being named in the starting line-up.

In November 2021 he signed for Atlas Delmenhorst. His early performances were praised by local media.

== International career ==
On 31 August 2015, Darwish made his senior debut with Palestine in a friendly match against Lebanon after being named in the starting line-up.

On 31 December 2017, Darwish was named as part of the Palestine under-23 squad for 2018 AFC U-23 Championship. Ten days later, he made his debut with Palestine U23 in 2018 AFC U-23 Championship group stage against Japan U23 after coming on as a substitute at 60th minute in place of Shehab Qumbor.
