= Kang Ju-hyok =

North Korean footballer (born 1997)

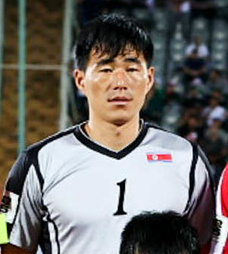
- Kang in 2025

Personal information
- Date of birth: 31 May 1997 (age 29)
- Place of birth: North Korea
- Height: 1.85 m (6 ft 1 in)
- Position: Goalkeeper

Team information
- Current team: Hwaebul
- Number: 18

Senior career*
Years	Team	Apps	(Gls)
–2018	April 25		
2018–	Hwaebul		

International career^{‡}
2017–2023	North Korea U23	24 (Note: Appearances as an overage player (five appearances in the 2022 Asian Games))	(0)
2019–	North Korea	2	(0)
- * Club domestic league appearances and goals ‡ National team caps and goals as of 13 January 2024

Kang Ju-hyok (Korean: 강주혁; born 31 May 1997) is a North Korean professional footballer who plays as a goalkeeper for DPR Korea Premier Football League club Hwaebul and the North Korea national football team.

== Club career ==
Kang began his youth career at a youth sport school in Songyo district, Pyongyang. After his graduation, he signed for April 25, where he was mentored by Li Chan-myung, North Korea's starting goalkeeper in the 1966 FIFA World Cup. Later, Kang joined Hwaebul.

== International career ==
=== Under-23 ===
Kang received his first international call-up in 2017 to the under-23 side for the qualifying matches for the 2018 AFC U-23 Championships. He made his debut against Hong Kong in a 1–1 draw. He played in all three qualifying matches as North Korea qualified for the finals in China.

A month before the tournament, he travelled with the under-23 squad to Thailand to partake in the M-150 Cup held in Buriram. In their first match against Japan on 11 December 2017, Kang made a fine top corner save in a 4–0 defeat as the North Koreans ended the game with nine men. He kept his second clean sheet at youth level against Thailand on 13 December 2017.

Kang would remain the starting goalkeeper for the under-23 side and made his competitive debut in the AFC U-23 Championships against Thailand and kept another clean sheet in a 1–0 victory. Against Palestine in the next game, Kang would be at fault for the opener as his attempted clearance was hit straight at Oday Dabbagh, allowing him to score into an empty net. In the last fixture against Japan, Kang would save Reo Hatate's spot kick tipping it towards the bar but would unfortunately score an own goal instead when the ball bounced onto his back and into goal. North Korea went out of the group stage by virtue of goal difference as Kang's mistake against Palestine proved detrimental.

Approaching the 2018 Asian Games in Indonesia, Kang was called up again as the number one and made his Asian Games debut on 15 August 2018 against Myanmar in a 1–1 draw. Kang would partially be at fault for the second goal against Iran in the next game after his sweeping led to miscommunication between him and An Song-il as the latter headed the ball past Kang allowing Mehdi Ghaedi to tap it in into an empty net as the North Koreans lost 3–0. The team would manage to turn their fortunes around however as their 3–0 victory against Saudi Arabia allowed them to advance into the Round of 16. The under-23 team beat Bangladesh 3–1 and faced the United Arab Emirates. After a 1–1 draw in extra-time, penalty kicks ensued which saw the North Koreans crash out on penalties losing 5–3.

Kang was recalled to the under-23 squad for the qualification matches held in Mongolia for the 2020 AFC U-23 Championships in Thailand. After a 1–0 victory against the hosts and a 1–1 draw to Singapore, Kang was named captain in the last match against Hong Kong in a 2–0 victory to qualify for the finals. Their opening game against Jordan would be a 2–1 defeat as Kang conceded a spot kick at the stroke of half time. The North Korean's 2–0 defeat to the United Arab Emirates meant that they failed to qualify for the knockout stages for a second consecutive tournament since 2016. Kang and his team ended on a high note as they beat Vietnam 2–1 for the final match. This would be the last time Kang ever featured in an international match as the COVID-19 pandemic forced his country to close their borders and consequently, withdraw the nation from all international sporting events.

=== Senior career ===
Kang's performance at both club and international level rewarded him with a senior call-up as North Korea travelled to the United Arab Emirates for the 2019 Asian Cup. Kang was an unused substitute in all three matches as North Korea were knocked out in the group stage.

==== Overaged call-up to Hangzhou ====
North Korea made their return to international football in 2023 as they participated in the 2022 Hangzhou Asian Games. Kang was called up as an overaged player alongside Kim Kuk-bom and club teammate Jang Kuk-chol. Kang kept four consecutive clean sheets against Taiwan, Kyrgyzstan, Indonesia, and Bahrain. With the score at 1–1 against Japan, Kang conceded a penalty after he was adjourned to have brought down Jun Nishikawa down in the penalty box as he attempted to smother the ball. This led to Yuta Matsumura slotting in the penalty and the winner to send the North Koreans home. At the end of the match, Kang was seen remonstrating with referee Rustam Lutfullin alongside captain Jang and Kim Kyong-sok leading to headlines criticising the behaviour of the North Koreans.

==== New number one ====
Ahead of the 2026 FIFA World Cup qualifiers, Kang was recalled to the senior squad as the starting goalkeeper, replacing An Tae-song. In the opening match against Syria, Kang conceded a penalty as he jumped onto Omar Khrbin, letting Omar Al-Somah convert the spot kick as the Chollima lost 1–0 in Jeddah.

On 21 March 2024 in a qualifying match against Japan, while losing 1–0 thanks to Ao Tanaka's early strike, Kang produced a number of saves to prevent the Koreans from conceding more, receiving praises from Japanese press. In North Korea's penultimate match against Syria on 6 June 2024, the Koreans needed nothing less than a win to keep their hopes for third round qualification alive. Kang produced several good saves including a point blank save against Tobías Cervera. Kang's first clean sheet for his country provided hope in their qualifying campaign

== Style of play ==
Kang boasts great reflexes, making several sharp saves thanks to his athleticism. His distribution has led to several goal scoring chances. He is a sweeper-keeper and is quick to rush out for incoming attacks. However, due to his rashness, it has resulted in conceding several goals. He has since improved on his rushes and has shown a more calming presence at the back.
