= Jiangyin Sports Centre =

Sports venue in Jiangyin, China

Coordinates: 31°55′34″N 120°17′18″E

Jiangyin Sports Centre Stadium
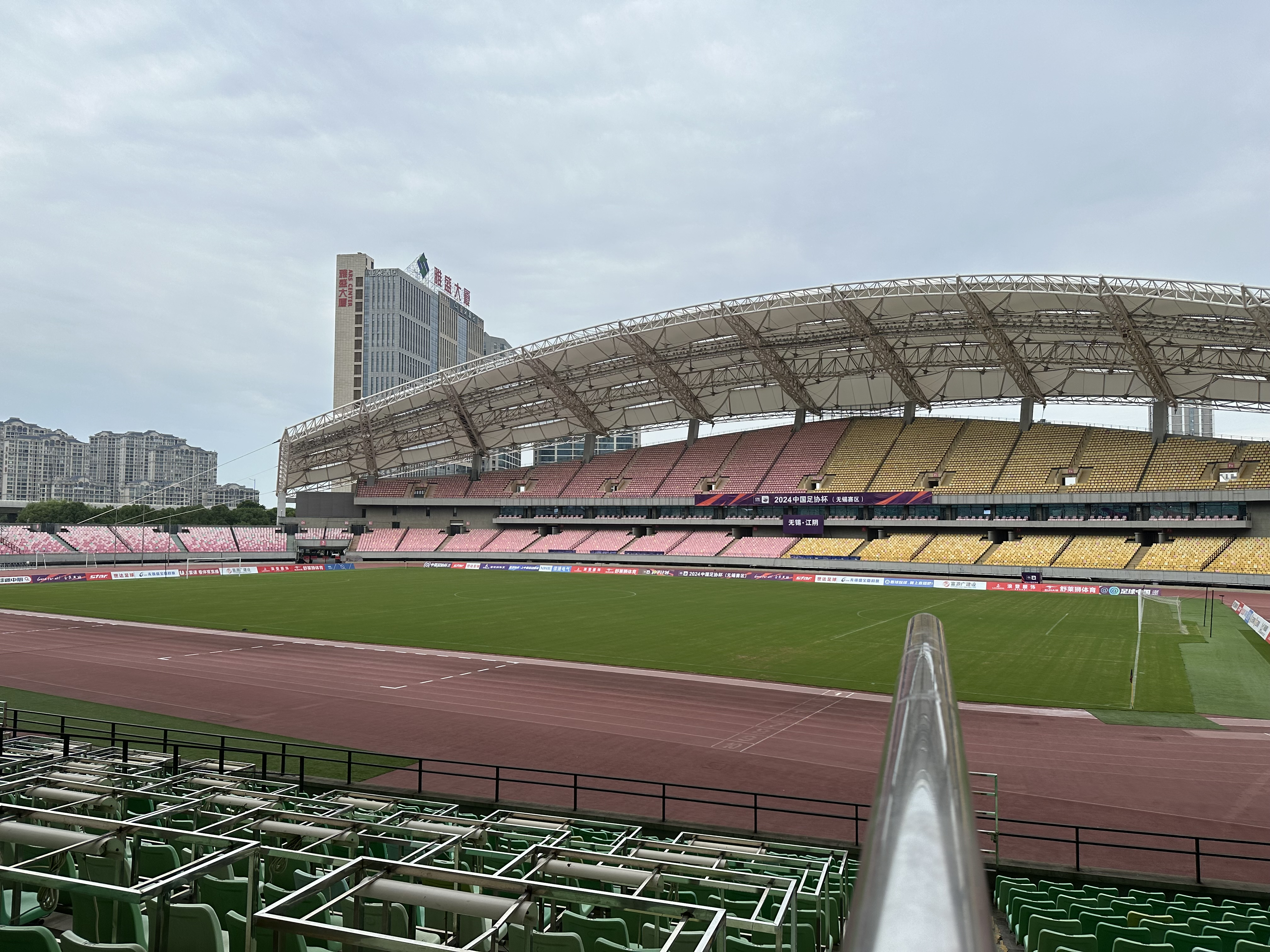
- Interactive map of Jiangyin Sports Centre Stadium
- Full name: Jiangyin Sports Park Stadium
- Location: Jiangyin, China
- Capacity: 30,161

Construction
- Opened: 2010

Jiangyin Sports Centre is a multi-purpose stadium in Jiangyin, China. It is currently used mostly for football matches. The stadium holds 30,161 spectators. It opened in 2010. It is one of the neutral venues being used for the 2021 Chinese Super League.
