= Ward Al-Barri =

Jordanian footballer

Personal information
- Date of birth: 29 July 1997 (age 29)
- Place of birth: Zarqa, Jordan
- Height: 1.83 m (6 ft 0 in)
- Position: Right-back

Team information
- Current team: Doqara

Youth career
- –2016: Shabab Al-Ordon

Senior career*
Years	Team	Apps	(Gls)
2016–2021	Shabab Al-Ordon		
2021–2023	Al-Faisaly		
2023–2024	Sahab		
2024–2025	Shabab Al-Ordon	20	(4)
2025–2026	Al-Hussein	5	(0)
2026–	Doqara	0	(0)

International career
2018–2020	Jordan U23	7	(1)
2019–	Jordan	1	(0)
- * Club domestic league appearances and goals as of 11 August 2026

Ward Helal Khalid Al-Barri (Arabic: ورد هلال خالد البرّي; born 29 July 1997) is a Jordanian professional footballer who plays as a right-back for Jordanian Pro League club Doqara ورد الطيراوي في الأردن

== Club career ==
=== Shabab Al-Ordon ===
Born in Zarqa, Al-Barri began his career at Shabab Al-Ordon.

=== Al-Faisaly ===
On 4 February 2021, Al-Faisaly announced the signing of Al-Barri alongside Mohammad Tannous.

On 10 July 2023, Al-Barri's contract was terminated.

=== Sahab ===
Al-Barri played with Sahab during the 2023–24 Jordanian Pro League season.

=== Return to Shabab Al-Ordon ===
With Sahab relegated to the Jordanian First Division League, Al-Barri decided to return to Shabab Al-Ordon due to the club giving him an opportunity as a professional earlier on in his career, as well as strengthening the team alongside its younger set of players.

=== Al-Hussein ===
On 23 June 2025, Al-Hussein announced the signing of Al-Barri, after a successful season with Shabab Al-Ordon.

== International career ==
On 2 January 2025, Al-Barri was called up to the Jordan national football team for a camp held in Amman. Al-Barri was called up once again to the national team to participate in a training camp held in Doha.
