= Lee Keun-ho (footballer, born 1996) =

South Korean footballer

Lee Keun-ho 이근호
Personal information
- Full name: Lee Keun-ho
- Date of birth: 21 May 1996 (age 30)
- Place of birth: South Korea
- Height: 1.86 m (6 ft 1 in)
- Position: Forward

Youth career
- 2012–2014: Eonnam High School
- 2015–2017: Yonsei University

Senior career*
| Years | Team | Apps | (Gls) |
| 2018 | Pohang Steelers | 30 | (3) |
| 2019 | Jeonbuk Hyundai Motors | 2 | (0) |
| 2019 | → Jeju United (loan) | 13 | (1) |
| 2020–2021 | → Gimcheon Sangmu (army) | 9 | (1) |
| 2022 | Jeonbuk Hyundai Motors B | 1 | (0) |
| 2023 | Ansan Greeners | 5 | (0) |
| 2024 | Trat | 11 | (3) |
| 2024 | Kowloon City | 4 | (2) |

International career^{‡}
| 2013 | South Korea U-20 | 2 | (0) |
| 2018–2019 | South Korea U-23 | 9 | (3) |
- * Club domestic league appearances and goals as of 1 January 2025 ‡ National team caps and goals as of 10 March 2017

- Lee Keun-ho
- Hangul: 이근호
- RR: I Geunho
- MR: I Kŭnho

Lee Keun-ho (Korean: 이근호; born 21 May 1996) is a South Korean professional footballer who plays as a forward.

== Club career ==
On 28 September 2024, Lee joined Hong Kong Premier League club Kowloon City.
