= Han Seung-gyu =

South Korean footballer (born 1996)

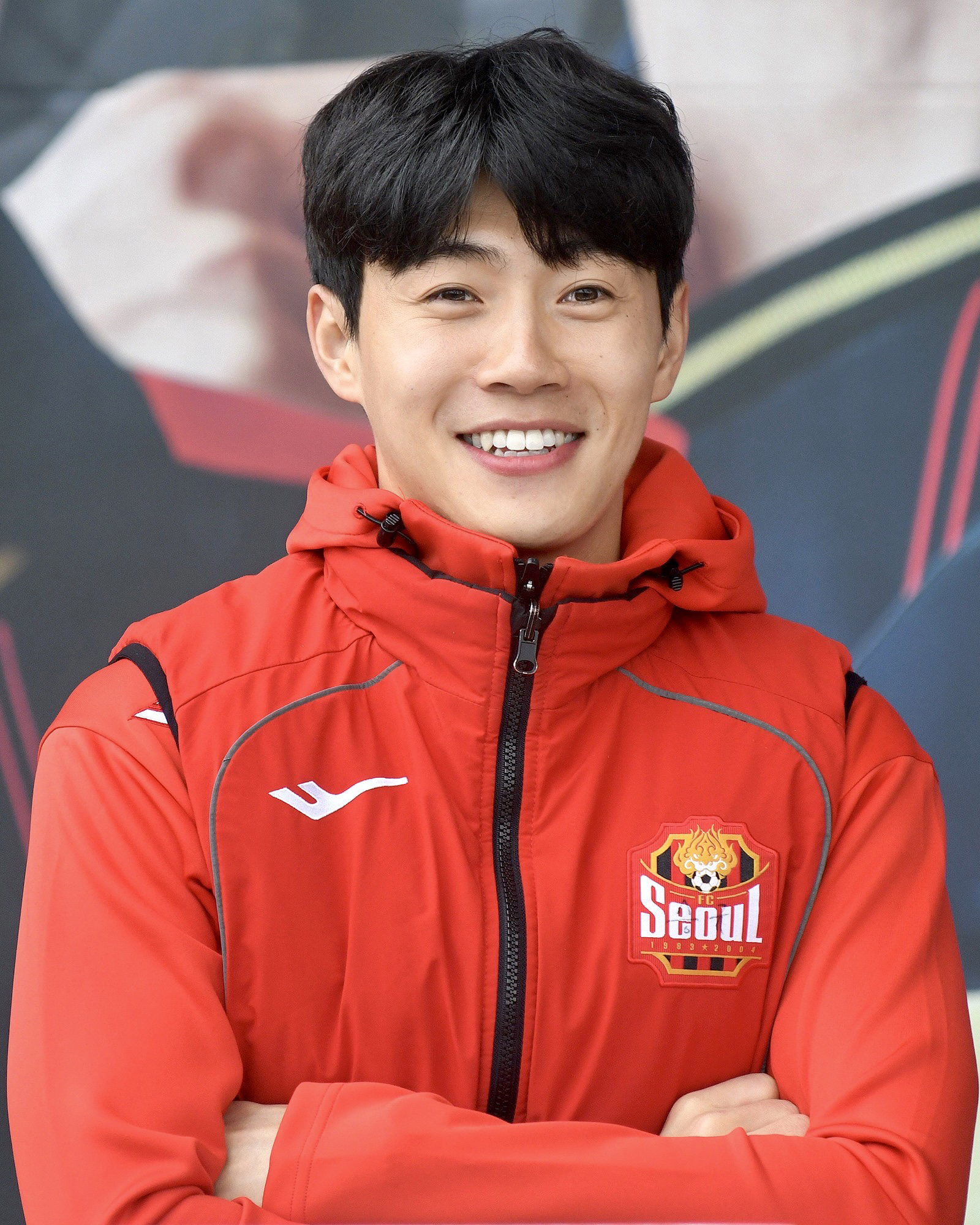
- Han in 2023

Personal information
- Date of birth: 28 September 1996 (age 30)
- Place of birth: Suwon, Gyeonggi-do, South Korea
- Height: 1.74 m (5 ft 9 in)
- Position: Midfielder

Team information
- Current team: Without club

Youth career
- 2012–2014: Eonnam High School
- 2015–2016: Yonsei University

Senior career*
Years	Team	Apps	(Gls)
2017–2018	Ulsan Hyundai	40	(6)
2019–2022	Jeonbuk Hyundai Motors	20	(2)
2020	→ FC Seoul (loan)	22	(3)
2021	→ Suwon FC (loan)	26	(2)
2022–2024	FC Seoul	10	(1)

International career^{‡}
2018	South Korea U-23	7	(3)
2018	South Korea	0	(0)
- * Club domestic league appearances and goals as of 26 July 2024 ‡ National team caps and goals as of 26 July 2024

- Han Seung-gyu
- Hangul: 한승규
- Hanja: 韓承圭
- RR: Han Seunggyu
- MR: Han Sŭnggyu

Han Seung-gyu (Korean: 한승규; born 28 September 1996) is a South Korean football midfielder.

== Club career ==
Han played college football for Yonsei University.

== International career ==
On 4 December 2024, Han Seung-gyu was called up for the South Korea national football team

== Career statistics ==
=== Club ===
As of 1 May 2021

Appearances and goals by club, season and competition
Club	Season	League			Cup		Continental		Total	
Club	Season	Division	Apps	Goals	Apps	Goals	Apps	Goals	Apps	Goals
Ulsan Hyundai	2017	K League 1	9	1	1	0	4	0	14	1
Ulsan Hyundai	2018	K League 1	31	5	4	0	4	0	39	5
Ulsan Hyundai	Total		40	6	5	0	8	0	53	6
Jeonbuk Hyundai Motors	2019	K League 1	19	2	1	0	1	0	21	2
FC Seoul (loan)	2020	K League 1	22	3	1	0	6	1	29	4
Suwon FC (loan)	2021	K League 1	10	1	0	0	—		10	1
Career total			91	12	7	0	15	1	113	13

== Honours ==
=== Club ===
Ulsan Hyundai:

- Korean FA Cup : 2017

Jeonbuk Hyundai Motors:

- K League 1 : 2019
