= Cho Jae-wan =

South Korean footballer (born 1995)

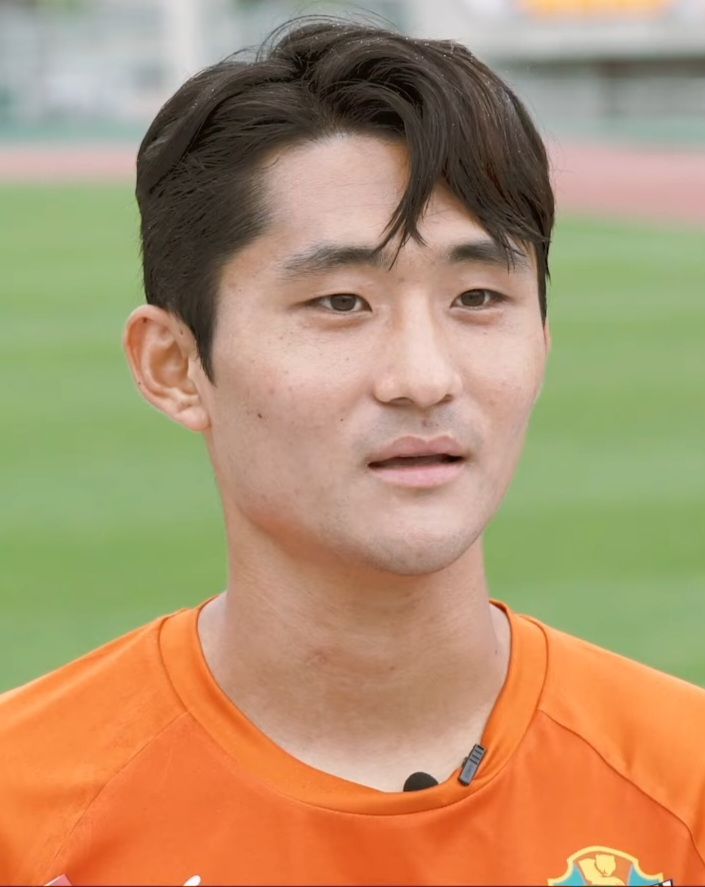

Personal information
- Full name: Cho Jae-wan
- Date of birth: 29 August 1995 (age 31)
- Place of birth: Changwon, South Korea
- Height: 1.74 m (5 ft 8 1/2 in)
- Position: Forward

Youth career
- 2015–2017: Sangji University

Senior career*
Years	Team	Apps	(Gls)
2018	Seoul E-Land	28	(6)
2019–2021	Gangwon FC	61	(17)

International career^{‡}
2014	South Korea U-20	3	(1)
2017	South Korea Universiade	6	(4)
2018	South Korea U-23	3	(1)
2021	South Korea	0	(0)
- * Club domestic league appearances and goals as of 10 October 2021 ‡ National team caps and goals as of 21 March 2021

Cho Jae-wan (Korean: 조재완; born 29 August 1995) is a former South Korean footballer who played as forward for Gangwon FC.

He is permanently banned from 2024, for sexually assaulting an intoxicated woman.

== Career ==
Cho joined K League 2 side Seoul E-Land FC before 2018 season starts.

== Club ==
As of 10 October 2021

Club performance			League		Cup		Continental		Total	
Season	Club	League	Apps	Goals	Apps	Goals	Apps	Goals	Apps	Goals
2018	Seoul E-Land	K League 2	28	6	0	0	—		28	6
2019	Gangwon FC	K League 1	17	8	2	0	—		19	8
2020	Gangwon FC	K League 1	22	5	1	0	—		23	5
2021	Gangwon FC	K League 1	22	4	1	0	—		23	4
Career total			89	23	4	0	—		93	23
