= Kunshan Sports Centre Stadium =

Sports venue in Kunshan, China

Kunshan Stadium
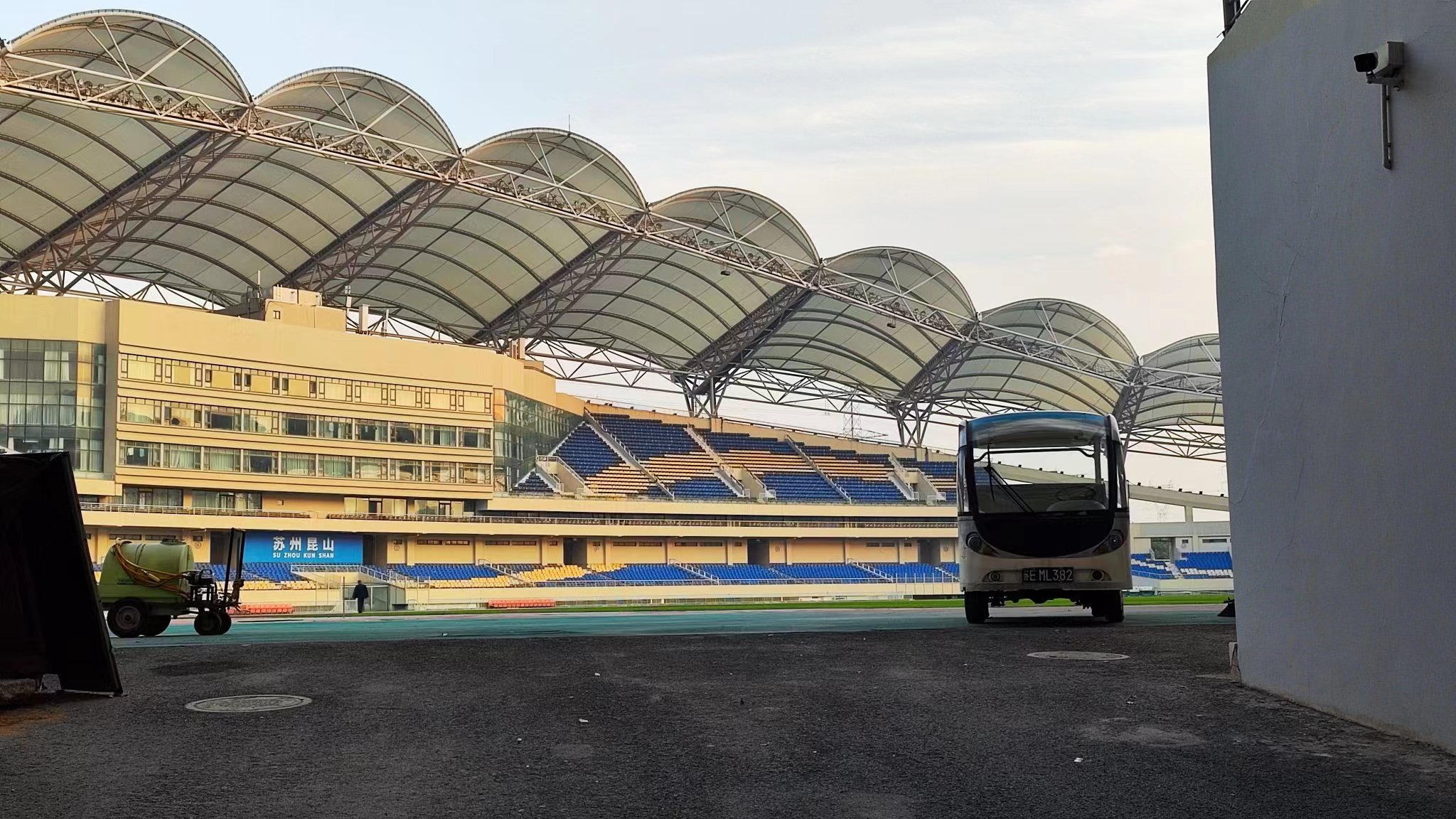
- Interactive map of Kunshan Stadium
- Full name: Kunshan Sports Centre Stadium
- Location: Kunshan, China
- Coordinates: 31.386152°N 120.905201°E
- Capacity: 30,000

Tenant
- Suzhou Dongwu (selected games)

The Kunshan Sports Centre Stadium (Chinese: 昆山市体育中心体育场) is a multi-purpose stadium in Kunshan, China. It is currently used mostly for soccer matches. The stadium holds 30,000 spectators. It is used for selected games by Suzhou Dongwu, and was previously home to Kunshan FC.

== See also ==
- List of football stadiums in China
- List of stadiums in China
- Lists of stadiums
