= Changshu Stadium =

Sports venue in Changshu, China

Coordinates: 31°39′29″N 120°46′39″E

- Interactive map of Changshu Stadium
- Full name: Changshu Sports Centre Stadium
- Location: Changshu, China
- Capacity: 30,000

Changshu Stadium is a multi-purpose stadium in Changshu, China. It is currently used mostly for football matches. The stadium holds 30,000 spectators.
