= Football at the 2018 Asian Games – Men's team squads =

The following is a list of squads for each nation competing in men's football at the 2018 Asian Games in Jakarta. Each nation must submit a squad of 20 players, 17 of whom must be born on or after 1 January 1995, and three of whom can be older dispensation players.

== Group A ==
=== Chinese Taipei ===
The following is the Chinese Taipei squad in the men's football tournament of the 2018 Asian Games. The team of 20 players was officially named on 7 August.

Head coach: Peng Wu-song

No.	Pos.	Player	Date of birth (age)	Club
1	GK	Pan Wen-chieh*	29 June 1992 (aged 26)	(Chinese Taipei Football Association) Tatung
2	DF	Wang Ruei*	10 August 1993 (aged 25)	(Chinese Taipei Football Association) Taiwan Power Company
3	DF	Chen Ting-yang* (captain)	28 September 1992 (aged 25)	(Chinese Taipei Football Association) Taiwan Power Company
4	DF	Tsuo Yu-chieh	24 September 1998 (aged 19)	(Chinese Taipei Football Association) Hang Yuen
5	MF	Huang Hsiang-che	2 May 1999 (aged 19)	(Chinese Taipei Football Association) Tatung
6	MF	Cheng Hao	13 January 1997 (aged 21)	(Chinese Taipei Football Association) Hasus TSU
7	FW	Yu Chia-huang	23 April 1998 (aged 20)	(Chinese Taipei Football Association) Hang Yuen
8	DF	Wu Yen-shu	21 October 1999 (aged 18)	(Chinese Taipei Football Association) Hualien High School
9	FW	Li Hsiang-wei	15 April 1996 (aged 22)	(Chinese Taipei Football Association) Tainan City
10	FW	Chen Chao-an	22 June 1995 (aged 23)	(Chinese Taipei Football Association) NSTC
11	FW	Li Kai-jie	22 July 1996 (aged 22)	(Chinese Taipei Football Association) Hasus TSU
12	MF	Chen Sheng-wei	13 September 1995 (aged 22)	(Chinese Taipei Football Association) Hasus TSU
13	MF	Chen Hung-wei	28 September 1997 (aged 20)	(Chinese Taipei Football Association) Hasus TSU
14	MF	Lai Chih-hsuan	29 July 1995 (aged 23)	(Chinese Taipei Football Association) Taiwan Power Company
15	MF	Wang Kuan-ju	20 January 1996 (aged 22)	(Chinese Taipei Football Association) Hasus TSU
16	MF	Chao Ming-hsiu	9 July 1997 (aged 21)	(Chinese Taipei Football Association) Hasus TSU
17	DF	Hsu Hung-chih	18 March 1996 (aged 22)	(Chinese Taipei Football Association) Hang Yuen
18	GK	Tsai Shuo-che	14 January 1996 (aged 22)	(Chinese Taipei Football Association) Hasus TSU
19	DF	Wei Mao-ting	15 January 1996 (aged 22)	(Chinese Taipei Football Association) Hang Yuen
20	MF	Tu Shao-chieh	2 January 1999 (aged 19)	(Chinese Taipei Football Association) Ming Chuan University

* Over-aged player.

=== Hong Kong ===
The following is the Hong Kong squad in the men's football tournament of the 2018 Asian Games.

Head coach: Kwok Kar Lok

No.	Pos.	Player	Date of birth (age)	Club
1	GK	Yuen Ho Chun	19 July 1995 (aged 23)	(Football Association of Hong Kong, China) Lee Man
2	DF	Fernando Recio*	17 December 1982 (aged 35)	(Football Association of Hong Kong, China) Kitchee
3	DF	Tsui Wang Kit	5 January 1997 (aged 21)	(Chinese Football Association) Meizhou Hakka
4	DF	Lau Hok Ming (captain)	19 October 1995 (aged 22)	(Football Association of Hong Kong, China) Southern
5	DF	Vas Núñez	12 November 1995 (aged 22)	(Football Association of Hong Kong, China) R&F
6	MF	Tan Chun Lok	15 January 1996 (aged 22)	(Chinese Football Association) Guangzhou R&F
7	FW	Cheng Chin Lung	7 January 1998 (aged 20)	(Football Association of Hong Kong, China) Kitchee
8	MF	Remi Dujardin	23 June 1997 (aged 21)	(United States Soccer Federation) St. Bonaventure Bonnies
9	FW	Chung Wai Keung	21 October 1995 (aged 22)	(Football Association of Hong Kong, China) Tai Po
10	MF	Lam Ka Wai*	5 June 1985 (aged 33)	(Football Association of Hong Kong, China) Eastern
11	FW	Matt Orr	1 January 1997 (aged 21)	(United States Soccer Federation) San Francisco Dons
12	MF	Wu Chun Ming	21 November 1997 (aged 20)	(Football Association of Hong Kong, China) Pegasus
13	DF	Yiu Ho Ming	1 May 1995 (aged 23)	(Football Association of Hong Kong, China) Eastern
14	DF	Tse Long Hin	6 February 1995 (aged 23)	(Football Association of Hong Kong, China) Eastern
15	DF	Yu Pui Hong	7 February 1995 (aged 23)	(Football Association of Hong Kong, China) Lee Man
19	GK	Chan Ka Ho	27 January 1996 (aged 22)	(Football Association of Hong Kong, China) Kitchee
16	MF	Lam Hin Ting	9 December 1999 (aged 18)	(Football Association of Hong Kong, China) Dreams FC
17	MF	Law Hiu Chung	10 June 1995 (aged 23)	(Football Association of Hong Kong, China) Pegasus
18	FW	Jordi Tarrés*	16 March 1981 (aged 37)	(Football Association of Hong Kong, China) Kitchee
20	FW	Chiu Siu Wai	16 February 1996 (aged 22)	(Football Association of Hong Kong, China) Tai Po

* Over-aged player.

=== Indonesia ===
The following is Indonesia's 20-man squad for the men's football tournament of the 2018 Asian Games, officially named on 10 August.

Head coach: (Spain) Luis Milla

No.	Pos.	Player	Date of birth (age)	Caps	Goals	Club
1	GK	Awan Setho	20 March 1997 (aged 21)	0	0	(Football Association of Indonesia) Bhayangkara
12	GK	Andritany Ardhiyasa*	26 December 1991 (aged 26)	1	0	(Football Association of Indonesia) Persija Jakarta
2	DF	Putu Gede	7 June 1995 (aged 23)	1	0	(Football Association of Indonesia) Bhayangkara
3	DF	Andy Setyo	16 September 1997 (aged 20)	0	0	(Football Association of Indonesia) PS TIRA
5	DF	Bagas Adi	8 March 1997 (aged 21)	0	0	(Football Association of Indonesia) Arema
7	DF	Rezaldi Hehanusa	7 November 1995 (aged 22)	1	0	(Football Association of Indonesia) Persija Jakarta
11	DF	Gavin Kwan Adsit	5 April 1996 (aged 22)	0	0	(Football Association of Indonesia) Barito Putera
15	DF	Ricky Fajrin	6 September 1995 (aged 22)	1	0	(Football Association of Indonesia) Bali United
16	DF	Hansamu Yama (captain)	16 January 1995 (aged 23)	1	0	(Football Association of Indonesia) Barito Putera
4	MF	Zulfiandi	17 July 1995 (aged 23)	1	0	(Football Association of Indonesia) Sriwijaya
6	MF	Evan Dimas	13 March 1995 (aged 23)	1	0	(Football Association of Malaysia) Selangor
8	MF	Muhammad Hargianto	24 July 1996 (aged 22)	1	1	(Football Association of Indonesia) Bhayangkara
19	MF	Hanif Sjahbandi	7 April 1997 (aged 21)	0	0	(Football Association of Indonesia) Arema
9	FW	Beto Gonçalves*	31 December 1980 (aged 37)	1	1	(Football Association of Indonesia) Sriwijaya
10	FW	Stefano Lilipaly*	10 January 1990 (aged 28)	1	2	(Football Association of Indonesia) Bali United
13	FW	Febri Hariyadi	19 February 1996 (aged 22)	1	0	(Football Association of Indonesia) Persib Bandung
14	FW	Septian David	2 September 1996 (aged 21)	0	0	(Football Association of Indonesia) Mitra Kukar
17	FW	Saddil Ramdani	2 January 1999 (aged 19)	1	0	(Football Association of Indonesia) Persela Lamongan
18	FW	Irfan Jaya	1 May 1996 (aged 22)	1	0	(Football Association of Indonesia) Persebaya Surabaya
20	FW	Ilham Armaiyn	10 May 1996 (aged 22)	1	0	(Football Association of Malaysia) Selangor

* Over-aged player.

=== Laos ===
The following is the Laos squad in the men's football tournament of the 2018 Asian Games. The team of 20 players was officially named on 7 August.

Head coach: (Singapore) Mike Wong Mun Heng

No.	Pos.	Player	Date of birth (age)	Caps	Goals	Club
1	GK	Outthilath Nammakhoth	13 September 1996 (aged 21)			(Lao Football Federation) Master 7
26	GK	Saymanolinh Paseuth	19 July 1999 (aged 19)	2		(Lao Football Federation) Young Elephant
6	DF	Kittisak Phomvongsa	27 July 1999 (aged 19)	2		(Lao Football Federation) Young Elephant
8	DF	Sonevilai Sihavong	18 August 1996 (aged 21)	1		(Lao Football Federation) Master 7
16	DF	Xayasith Singsavang	17 December 2000 (aged 17)	2		(Lao Football Federation) Young Elephant
18	DF	Xouxana Sihalath	22 July 1996 (aged 22)	2		(Lao Football Federation) Lao Army
24	DF	Aphixay Thanakhanty	15 July 1998 (aged 20)	2		(Lao Football Federation) Young Elephant
7	MF	Phoutthasay Khochalern (captain)	29 December 1995 (aged 22)	2	1	(Football Association of Thailand) Nakhon Pathom United
10	MF	Lathasay Lounlasy	29 March 1998 (aged 20)	2	1	(Lao Football Federation) Young Elephant
13	MF	Soulivanh Nivone	16 May 1998 (aged 20)			(Lao Football Federation) Young Elephant
14	MF	Kiengthavesak Xayxanapanya	14 March 1999 (aged 19)	2		(Lao Football Federation) Lao Police Club
15	MF	Kaharn Phetsivilay	9 September 1998 (aged 19)			(Lao Football Federation) Young Elephant
17	MF	Bounphachan Bounkong	29 November 2000 (aged 17)	2		(Lao Football Federation) Young Elephant
19	MF	Kydavone Souvanny	22 November 1999 (aged 18)			(Lao Football Federation) Young Elephant
21	MF	Tiny Bounmalay*	6 June 1993 (aged 25)	2		(Lao Football Federation) Lao Police Club
22	MF	Phithack Kongmathilath	6 August 1996 (aged 22)	2	1	(Lao Football Federation) Lao Army
23	MF	Phouthone Innalay*	11 February 1992 (aged 26)	2		(Lao Football Federation) Lao Army
9	FW	Soukchinda Natphasouk	30 October 1995 (aged 22)	2		(Lao Football Federation) Lao Police Club
11	FW	Chansamone Phommalivong	6 April 1998 (aged 20)			(Lao Football Federation) Young Elephant
25	FW	Somxay Keohanam	27 July 1998 (aged 20)	1		(Lao Football Federation) Young Elephant

* Over-aged player.

=== Palestine ===
The following is the Palestine squad in the men's football tournament of the 2018 Asian Games. The team of 20 players was officially named on 8 August.

Head coach: Ayman Sandouqa

No.	Pos.	Player	Date of birth (age)	Club
1	GK	Ramzi Fakhouri	19 February 1996 (aged 22)	(Palestinian Football Association) Thaqafi Tulkarm
2	DF	Ahmed Qatmish	10 March 1998 (aged 20)	(Palestinian Football Association) Thaqafi Tulkarm
3	MF	Mohammed Bassim	3 July 1995 (aged 23)	(Palestinian Football Association) Shabab Al-Bireh
4	DF	Michel Termanini	8 May 1998 (aged 20)	(Swedish Football Association) AFC Eskilstuna
5	DF	Abdelatif Bahdari* (captain)	20 February 1984 (aged 34)	(Palestinian Football Association) Merkaz Balata
6	MF	Mohanad Fannoun	18 September 1995 (aged 22)	(Palestinian Football Association) Shabab Al-Khalil
7	MF	Mahmoud Abu Warda	31 May 1995 (aged 23)	(Palestinian Football Association) Markaz Balata
9	FW	Oday Dabbagh	3 December 1998 (aged 19)	(Palestinian Football Association) Hilal Al-Quds
10	FW	Mahmoud Yousef	30 July 1997 (aged 21)	(Palestinian Football Association) Shabab Al-Khalil
11	DF	Omar El-Sherif	13 February 1997 (aged 21)	(Egyptian Football Association) Wadi Degla
13	FW	Shehab Qumbor	10 August 1997 (aged 21)	(Palestinian Football Association) Jabal Al-Mukaber
14	DF	Yousef Al-Ashhab	10 February 1995 (aged 23)	(Palestinian Football Association) Shabab Al-Khalil
15	MF	Hani Abdallah	3 February 1998 (aged 20)	(Palestinian Football Association) Hilal Al-Quds
16	GK	Rami Hamadi*	24 March 1994 (aged 24)	(Palestinian Football Association) Hilal Al-Quds
18	FW	Mohammed Obaid	30 September 1998 (aged 19)	(Palestinian Football Association) Hilal Al-Quds
19	MF	Sameh Maraaba*	19 March 1992 (aged 26)	(Palestinian Football Association) Shabab Al-Khalil
20	FW	Mohamed Darwish	20 February 1997 (aged 21)	(German Football Association) Arminia Hannover
22	GK	Naim Abuaker	20 January 1995 (aged 23)	(Palestinian Football Association) Ahli Al-Khaleel
17	DF	Mousa Farawi	22 March 1998 (aged 20)	(Palestinian Football Association) Hilal Al-Quds
23	DF	Mohammed Khalil	5 April 1998 (aged 20)	(Palestinian Football Association) Hilal Ariha

* Over-aged player.

== Group B ==
=== Bangladesh ===
The following is the Bangladesh squad in the men's football tournament of the 2018 Asian Games.

Head coach: (England) Jamie Day

No.	Pos.	Player	Date of birth (age)	Club
1	GK	Ashraful Islam Rana*	1 May 1988 (aged 30)	(Bangladesh Football Federation) Sheikh Russel
2	DF	Sushanto Tripura	5 October 1998 (aged 19)	(Bangladesh Football Federation) Saif Sporting
3	DF	Rahmat Mia	8 December 1999 (aged 18)	(Bangladesh Football Federation) Saif Sporting
4	MF	Jamal Bhuyan* (captain)	10 April 1990 (aged 28)	(Bangladesh Football Federation) Saif Sporting
5	DF	Tutul Hossain Badsha	12 August 1999 (aged 18)	(Bangladesh Football Federation) Dhaka Abahani
6	DF	Topu Barman*	20 December 1994 (aged 23)	(Bangladesh Football Federation) Saif Sporting
7	FW	Mahbubur Rahman Sufil	10 September 1999 (aged 18)	(Bangladesh Football Federation) Bashundhara Kings
8	MF	Atiqur Rahman Fahad	15 September 1995 (aged 22)	(Bangladesh Football Federation) Dhaka Abahani
9	FW	Saad Uddin	1 September 1998 (aged 19)	(Bangladesh Football Federation) Dhaka Abahani
10	MF	Masuk Mia Jony	16 January 1998 (aged 20)	(Bangladesh Football Federation) Saif Sporting
11	FW	Jafar Iqbal	27 September 1997 (aged 20)	(Bangladesh Football Federation) Chittagong Abahani
12	DF	Bishwanath Ghosh	30 May 1999 (aged 19)	(Bangladesh Football Federation) Sheikh Russel
13	GK	Anisur Rahman	10 August 1997 (aged 21)	(Bangladesh Football Federation) Bashundhara Kings
14	FW	Mohammad Abdullah	16 October 1997 (aged 20)	(Bangladesh Football Federation) Chittagong Abahani
15	MF	Biplu Ahmed	5 May 1999 (aged 19)	(Bangladesh Football Federation) Sheikh Russel
16	FW	Motin Mia	20 December 1998 (aged 19)	(Bangladesh Football Federation) Bashundhara Kings
17	MF	Rabiul Hasan	26 June 1999 (aged 19)	(Bangladesh Football Federation) Arambagh
18	DF	Monjurur Rahman	5 September 1996 (aged 21)	(Bangladesh Football Federation) Mohammedan
19	MF	Fazlay Rabbi	16 May 1996 (aged 22)	(Bangladesh Football Federation) Sheikh Russel
23	GK	Mahfuz Hasan Pritom	5 November 1999 (aged 18)	(Bangladesh Football Federation) Arambagh

* Over-aged player.

=== Qatar ===
The following is the Qatar squad in the men's football tournament of the 2018 Asian Games. The team of 20 players was officially named on 8 August.

Manager: (Spain) Unai Melgosa

No.	Pos.	Player	Date of birth (age)	Club
1	GK	Mohamed Saeed Ibrahim	17 January 1998 (aged 20)	(Qatar Football Association) Al-Wakrah
2	DF	Tarek Salman	5 December 1997 (aged 20)	(Qatar Football Association) Al Sadd
3	DF	Elias Ahmed	12 December 1997 (aged 20)	(Qatar Football Association) Al-Gharafa
4	MF	Omar Al-Amadi	5 April 1995 (aged 23)	(Qatar Football Association) Qatar SC
5	DF	Tameem Al-Muhaza	21 July 1996 (aged 22)	(Qatar Football Association) Al-Gharafa
6	MF	Ahmed Fadhel*	7 April 1993 (aged 25)	(Qatar Football Association) Al-Wakrah
7	MF	Khalid Muneer	24 February 1998 (aged 20)	(Royal Spanish Football Federation) Astorga
8	FW	Hatim Kamal Hassanin	9 May 1997 (aged 21)	(Qatar Football Association) Al Sadd
9	FW	Meshaal Al-Shammeri	19 January 1995 (aged 23)	(Qatar Football Association) Al Sadd
10	FW	Saoud Farhan	11 February 1995 (aged 23)	(Tunisian Football Federation) CA Bizertin
11	MF	Nasser Ibrahim Al-Nassr	11 July 1995 (aged 23)	(Qatar Football Association) Al-Markhiya
12	DF	Jassem Mohammed Omar (captain)	18 April 1995 (aged 23)	(Qatar Football Association) Al-Ahli
13	DF	Meshaal Ibrahim	9 September 1998 (aged 19)	(Qatar Football Association) Al Sadd
14	FW	Ahmed Al Saadi	2 October 1995 (aged 22)	(Qatar Football Association) Al-Rayyan
15	MF	Adel Bader	17 January 1997 (aged 21)	(Qatar Football Association) Al-Duhail
16	MF	Hazem Shehata	2 February 1998 (aged 20)	(Qatar Football Association) Al-Duhail
17	MF	Abdurahman Mostafa	5 April 1997 (aged 21)	(Qatar Football Association) Al-Duhail
18	DF	Salah Al-Yahri	25 August 1995 (aged 22)	(Qatar Football Association) Al-Khor
21	GK	Marwan Badreldin	17 April 1999 (aged 19)	(Qatar Football Association) Al-Ahli
22	GK	Mohammed Al-Bakri	28 March 1997 (aged 21)	(Qatar Football Association) Al-Markhiya

* Over-aged player.

=== Thailand ===
The following is the Thailand squad in the men's football tournament of the 2018 Asian Games. The team of 20 players was officially named on 11 August.

Head coach: (Thailand) Worrawoot Srimaka

No.	Pos.	Player	Date of birth (age)	Caps	Goals	Club
1	GK	Kwanchai Suklom	12 January 1995 (aged 23)			(Football Association of Thailand) Prachuap
2	DF	Pawee Tanthatemee	22 October 1996 (aged 21)			(Football Association of Thailand) Ubon UMT United
3	DF	Suriya Singmui	7 April 1995 (aged 23)			(Football Association of Thailand) Chiangrai United
4	DF	Worawut Namvech	4 July 1995 (aged 23)			(Football Association of Thailand) Port
5	DF	Shinnaphat Leeaoh	2 February 1997 (aged 21)			(Football Association of Thailand) Chiangrai United
6	MF	Phitiwat Sukjitthammakul	1 February 1995 (aged 23)			(Football Association of Thailand) Chiangrai United
7	MF	Nopphon Ponkam	19 July 1996 (aged 22)			(Football Association of Thailand) Police Tero
8	MF	Worachit Kanitsribampen	24 August 1997 (aged 20)			(Football Association of Thailand) Chonburi
9	FW	Chenrop Samphaodi (captain)	2 June 1995 (aged 23)			(Football Association of Thailand) Muangthong United
10	MF	Chaiyawat Buran	26 October 1995 (aged 22)			(Football Association of Thailand) Chiangrai United
11	MF	Tanasith Siripala	9 August 1995 (aged 23)			(Football Association of Thailand) Suphanburi
12	MF	Ratthanakorn Maikami	7 January 1998 (aged 20)			(Football Association of Thailand) Buriram United
13	FW	Supachai Jaided	1 December 1998 (aged 19)			(Football Association of Thailand) Buriram United
14	MF	Montree Promsawat	27 August 1995 (aged 22)			(Football Association of Thailand) Ratchaburi Mitr Phol
15	DF	Saringkan Promsupa	29 March 1997 (aged 21)			(Football Association of Thailand) Muangthong United
16	MF	Sansern Limwattana	31 July 1997 (aged 21)			(Football Association of Thailand) Sukhothai
17	MF	Ekanit Panya	21 October 1999 (aged 18)			(Football Association of Thailand) Chiangmai
18	DF	Wanchai Jarunongkran	18 December 1996 (aged 21)			(Football Association of Thailand) Bangkok United
19	MF	Supachok Sarachat	22 May 1998 (aged 20)			(Football Association of Thailand) Buriram United
20	GK	Nont Muangngam	20 April 1997 (aged 21)			(Football Association of Thailand) Police Tero

* Over-aged player.

=== Uzbekistan ===
The following is the Uzbekistan squad in the men's football tournament of the 2018 Asian Games. The team of 20 players was officially named on 10 August.

Head coach: (Uzbekistan) Ravshan Khaydarov

No.	Pos.	Player	Date of birth (age)	Caps	Goals	Club
1	GK	Botirali Ergashev	23 June 1995 (aged 23)			(Uzbekistan Football Association) Navbahor Namangan
12	GK	Rahimjon Davronov	3 October 1996 (aged 21)			(Uzbekistan Football Association) Mash'al Mubarek
2	DF	Rustam Ashurmatov	7 July 1995 (aged 23)			(Uzbekistan Football Association) Bunyodkor
3	DF	Xojiakbar Alijonov	19 April 1997 (aged 21)			(Uzbekistan Football Association) Pakhtakor Tashkent
4	DF	Akramjon Komilov	14 March 1996 (aged 22)			(Uzbekistan Football Association) Bunyodkor
5	DF	Abbos Otakhonov	25 August 1995 (aged 22)			(Uzbekistan Football Association) Metallurg Bekabad
13	DF	Islom Kobilov	1 June 1997 (aged 21)			(Uzbekistan Football Association) Bunyodkor
16	DF	Doniyorjon Narzullaev	11 April 1995 (aged 23)			(Uzbekistan Football Association) Nasaf Qarshi
20	DF	Dostonbek Tursunov	13 June 1995 (aged 23)			(Uzbekistan Football Association) Neftchi Fergana
6	MF	Jaloliddin Masharipov*	1 September 1993 (aged 24)			(Uzbekistan Football Association) Pakhtakor Tashkent
7	MF	Odiljon Hamrobekov	13 February 1996 (aged 22)			(Uzbekistan Football Association) Nasaf Qarshi
8	MF	Jasurbek Yakhshiboev	24 June 1997 (aged 21)			(Uzbekistan Football Association) Pakhtakor Tashkent
10	MF	Javokhir Sidikov	8 December 1996 (aged 21)			(Uzbekistan Football Association) Kokand 1912
14	MF	Ikromjon Alibaev*	9 January 1994 (aged 24)			(Uzbekistan Football Association) Lokomotiv Tashkent
15	MF	Azizbek Turgunbaev	1 October 1994 (aged 23)			(Uzbekistan Football Association) Navbahor Namangan
17	MF	Dostonbek Khamdamov	24 July 1996 (aged 22)			(Russian Football Union) Anzhi
18	MF	Khursid Giyosov	13 April 1995 (aged 23)			(Uzbekistan Football Association) Bunyodkor
9	FW	Zabikhillo Urinboev (captain)	30 March 1995 (aged 23)			(Uzbekistan Football Association) Metallurg Bekabad
11	FW	Bobur Abdikholikov	23 April 1997 (aged 21)			(Uzbekistan Football Association) Nasaf Qarshi
19	FW	Andrey Sidorov	25 June 1995 (aged 23)			(Uzbekistan Football Association) Neftchi Fergana

* Over-aged player.

== Group C ==
=== China PR ===
The following is the China squad in the men's football tournament of the 2018 Asian Games. The final squad was announced on 10 August.

Head coach: (Italy) Massimiliano Maddaloni

No.	Pos.	Player	Date of birth (age)	Caps	Goals	Club
1	GK	Chen Wei	14 February 1998 (aged 20)	6	0	(Chinese Football Association) Shanghai SIPG
2	DF	Li Hailong	2 August 1996 (aged 22)	8	0	(Chinese Football Association) Shandong Luneng
3	MF	Chen Zhechao	19 April 1995 (aged 23)	22	1	(Chinese Football Association) Shandong Luneng
4	DF	Liu Yang	17 June 1995 (aged 23)	11	1	(Chinese Football Association) Shandong Luneng
5	DF	Gao Zhunyi	21 August 1995 (aged 22)	21	5	(Chinese Football Association) Hebei China Fortune
6	MF	Yao Junsheng	29 October 1995 (aged 22)	24	9	(Chinese Football Association) Shandong Luneng
7	MF	Wei Shihao	8 April 1995 (aged 23)	19	4	(Chinese Football Association) Beijing Guoan
8	MF	He Chao (captain)	19 April 1995 (aged 23)	23	1	(Chinese Football Association) Changchun Yatai
9	FW	Zhang Yuning	5 January 1997 (aged 21)	17	7	(Royal Dutch Football Association) ADO Den Haag
10	MF	Tang Shi	24 January 1995 (aged 23)	21	4	(Chinese Football Association) Guangzhou Evergrande
11	MF	Chen Binbin	10 June 1998 (aged 20)	5	0	(Chinese Football Association) Shanghai SIPG
12	GK	Zhou Yuchen	12 January 1995 (aged 23)	20	0	(Chinese Football Association) Shandong Luneng
13	FW	Huang Zichang	4 April 1997 (aged 21)	5	2	(Chinese Football Association) Jiangsu Suning
14	DF	Long Cheng	22 March 1995 (aged 23)	9	0	(Chinese Football Association) Henan Jianye
15	MF	Zhang Yuan	28 January 1997 (aged 21)	7	1	(Chinese Football Association) Guizhou Hengfeng
16	FW	Feng Boyuan	18 January 1995 (aged 23)	6	1	(Chinese Football Association) Liaoning
17	DF	Xu Yougang	9 February 1996 (aged 22)	3	0	(Chinese Football Association) Shanghai Shenhua
18	MF	Cao Yongjing	15 February 1997 (aged 21)	9	1	(Chinese Football Association) Beijing Renhe
19	DF	Liu Yiming	28 February 1995 (aged 23)	18	1	(Chinese Football Association) Tianjin Quanjian
20	DF	Deng Hanwen	8 January 1995 (aged 23)	18	1	(Chinese Football Association) Guangzhou Evergrande

* Over-aged player.

=== Syria ===
The following is the Syria squad in the men's football tournament of the 2018 Asian Games.

Head coach: Muhannad Al Fakeer

No.	Pos.	Player	Date of birth (age)	Club
1	GK	Ahmad Madania* (captain)	1 January 1990 (aged 28)	(Syrian Football Association) Al-Jaish
2	MF	Hussain Al Shouaeeb*	2 January 1992 (aged 26)	(Syrian Football Association) Al-Jaish
3	DF	Youssef Al Hamwi	1 February 1997 (aged 21)	(Syrian Football Association) Al-Jaish
4	DF	Jihad Besmar	10 January 1996 (aged 22)	(Syrian Football Association) Al-Karamah
5	DF	Fares Arnaout	31 January 1997 (aged 21)	(Syrian Football Association) Al-Jaish
6	MF	Ahmed Ashkar	1 January 1996 (aged 22)	(Syrian Football Association) Al-Jaish
7	FW	Mahmoud Al Baher*	3 January 1994 (aged 24)	(Syrian Football Association) Tishreen
8	MF	Mouhamad Anez	14 May 1995 (aged 23)	(Syrian Football Association) Al-Jaish
9	FW	Ahmad Al Khassi	27 January 1999 (aged 19)	(Syrian Football Association) Al-Jaish
10	MF	Mohammad Marmour	4 January 1995 (aged 23)	(Syrian Football Association) Tishreen
12	DF	Ahmad Al Ghalab	2 January 1996 (aged 22)	(Syrian Football Association) Al-Muhafaza
13	FW	Kamel Koaeh	1 January 1998 (aged 20)	(Syrian Football Association) Al-Shorta
14	DF	Abdullah Jinat	18 January 1996 (aged 22)	(Syrian Football Association) Al-Karamah
15	DF	Khaled Kurdaghli	31 January 1997 (aged 21)	(Syrian Football Association) Tishreen
17	MF	Zakria Hannan	21 August 1997 (aged 20)	(Syrian Football Association) Al Ittihad Aleppo
18	FW	Abd Al-Rahman Barakat	1 January 1998 (aged 20)	(Syrian Football Association) Al-Jaish
19	FW	Abdulhadi Shalha	19 January 1999 (aged 19)	(Syrian Football Association) Al-Wahda
20	MF	Ahmad Al Ahmad	18 October 1996 (aged 21)	(Syrian Football Association) Al Ittihad Aleppo
22	GK	Khaled Ibrahim	10 January 1996 (aged 22)	(Syrian Football Association) Al-Wahda
23	GK	Yazan Ourabi	30 January 1997 (aged 21)	(Syrian Football Association) Al Ittihad Aleppo

* Over-aged player.

=== Timor-Leste ===
The following is the Timor-Leste squad in the men's football tournament of the 2018 Asian Games.

Head coach: (Japan) Norio Tsukitate

No.	Pos.	Player	Date of birth (age)	Club
1	GK	Aderito	15 May 1997 (aged 21)	(East Timor Football Federation) Atlético Ultramar
2	DF	Julião	2 July 1998 (aged 20)	(East Timor Football Federation) SLB Benfica
3	DF	José Guterres	24 April 1998 (aged 20)	(East Timor Football Federation) Boavista
4	DF	Cândido Oliveira	2 December 1997 (aged 20)	(East Timor Football Federation) Ponta Leste
5	DF	Jorge Sabas (captain)	5 December 1997 (aged 20)	(East Timor Football Federation) Karketu Dili
6	MF	Nataniel	25 March 1995 (aged 23)	(East Timor Football Federation) Boavista
7	FW	Rufino Gama	20 June 1998 (aged 20)	(East Timor Football Federation) Karketu Dili
8	MF	Boavida Olegário*	24 October 1994 (aged 23)	(East Timor Football Federation) Karketu Dili
9	FW	Silvério Garcia*	2 April 1994 (aged 24)	(East Timor Football Federation) Ponta Leste
10	FW	Henrique Cruz	6 December 1997 (aged 20)	(East Timor Football Federation) Boavista
11	MF	Gelvánio Costa	8 October 1998 (aged 19)	(East Timor Football Federation) Karketu Dili
12	MF	José Fonseca*	19 September 1994 (aged 23)	(East Timor Football Federation) Cacusan
13	DF	Gumário	18 October 2001 (aged 16)	(East Timor Football Federation) Boavista
14	MF	Avigmas	24 December 1999 (aged 18)	(East Timor Football Federation) Boavista
15	MF	Armindo	18 April 1998 (aged 20)	(East Timor Football Federation) Académica
16	DF	Ricky*	17 June 1994 (aged 24)	(East Timor Football Federation) SLB Benfica
17	MF	Osvaldo Belo	18 October 2000 (aged 17)	(East Timor Football Federation) Karketu Dili
18	MF	Filomeno	5 August 2000 (aged 18)	(East Timor Football Federation) SLB Benfica
19	FW	Frangcyatma Alves	27 January 1997 (aged 21)	(East Timor Football Federation) Cacusan
20	GK	Fagio Augusto	29 April 1997 (aged 21)	(East Timor Football Federation) Karketu Dili

* Over-aged player.

=== United Arab Emirates ===
The following is the United Arab Emirates squad in the men's football tournament of the 2018 Asian Games. Mohammed Khalfan, who was originally in the squad announced earlier, was dropped from the squad as a result of indiscipline shown in the friendly match against Malaysia on 10 August 2018.

Head coach: (Poland) Maciej Skorża

No.	Pos.	Player	Date of birth (age)	Club
1	GK	Sultan Al-Mantheri	5 January 1995 (aged 23)	(United Arab Emirates Football Association) Al-Wasl
2	DF	Abdullah Al-Noubi	18 March 1995 (aged 23)	(United Arab Emirates Football Association) Al-Fujairah
3	DF	Ahmed Rashed (captain)	19 January 1997 (aged 21)	(United Arab Emirates Football Association) Al-Wahda
4	DF	Salem Sultan*	9 May 1993 (aged 25)	(United Arab Emirates Football Association) Al-Wahda
5	DF	Ismael Khaled	15 June 1997 (aged 21)	(United Arab Emirates Football Association) Shabab Al-Ahli
6	DF	Majed Suroor	14 October 1997 (aged 20)	(United Arab Emirates Football Association) Sharjah
7	FW	Ahmed Al Attas	28 September 1995 (aged 22)	(United Arab Emirates Football Association) Shabab Al-Ahli
10	MF	Jassem Yaqoub	16 March 1997 (aged 21)	(United Arab Emirates Football Association) Al-Nasr
12	DF	Khaled Ibrahim	17 January 1997 (aged 21)	(United Arab Emirates Football Association) Al-Wahda
16	FW	Ali Eid	1 March 1998 (aged 20)	(United Arab Emirates Football Association) Al-Ain
17	GK	Abdulrahman Al-Ameri	30 April 1998 (aged 20)	(United Arab Emirates Football Association) Al-Jazira
18	MF	Abdullah Ghanem	21 May 1995 (aged 23)	(United Arab Emirates Football Association) Sharjah
19	DF	Mohammed Al Attas	5 August 1997 (aged 21)	(United Arab Emirates Football Association) Al-Jazira
20	MF	Husain Abdulla Omar	11 January 1997 (aged 21)	(United Arab Emirates Football Association) Al-Ain
22	GK	Mohamed Al-Shamsi	4 January 1997 (aged 21)	(United Arab Emirates Football Association) Al-Wahda
23	DF	Hamad Al-Jasmi	11 January 1997 (aged 21)	(United Arab Emirates Football Association) Sharjah
24	FW	Mohammed Khalvan*	29 December 1992 (aged 25)	(United Arab Emirates Football Association) Al Fujairah
26	MF	Shahin Suroor	21 June 1996 (aged 22)	(United Arab Emirates Football Association) Al-Ittihad
27	FW	Zaid Al-Ameri	14 January 1997 (aged 21)	(United Arab Emirates Football Association) Al-Jazira
29	MF	Rashed Mohammed	6 December 1995 (aged 22)	(United Arab Emirates Football Association) Al-Nasr

* Over-aged player.

== Group D ==
=== Japan ===
The following is the Japan squad in the men's football tournament of the 2018 Asian Games. The team of 20 players was officially named on 3 August. Kakeru Funaki was initially called up, but had to pull out due to injury, with Takuma Ominami being called up to replace him.

Head coach: (Japan) Hajime Moriyasu

No.	Pos.	Player	Date of birth (age)	Club
1	GK	Ryosuke Kojima	30 January 1997 (aged 21)	(Japan Football Association) Waseda University
12	GK	Powell Obinna Obi	18 December 1997 (aged 20)	(Japan Football Association) Ryutsu Keizai University
3	DF	Makoto Okazaki	10 October 1998 (aged 19)	(Japan Football Association) FC Tokyo
4	MF	Ko Itakura	27 January 1997 (aged 21)	(Japan Football Association) Vegalta Sendai
5	DF	Daiki Sugioka	8 September 1998 (aged 19)	(Japan Football Association) Shonan Bellmare
7	DF	Teruki Hara	30 July 1998 (aged 20)	(Japan Football Association) Albirex Niigata
19	DF	Takuma Ominami	13 December 1997 (aged 20)	(Japan Football Association) Júbilo Iwata
20	DF	Yugo Tatsuta	21 June 1998 (aged 20)	(Japan Football Association) Shimizu S-Pulse
2	MF	Yoichi Naganuma	14 April 1997 (aged 21)	(Japan Football Association) Montedio Yamagata
6	MF	Ryo Hatsuse	10 July 1997 (aged 21)	(Japan Football Association) Gamba Osaka
8	MF	Kaoru Mitoma	20 May 1997 (aged 21)	(Japan Football Association) University of Tsukuba
10	MF	Koji Miyoshi	26 March 1997 (aged 21)	(Japan Football Association) Kawasaki Frontale
11	MF	Keita Endo	22 November 1997 (aged 20)	(Japan Football Association) Yokohama F. Marinos
13	MF	Yuto Iwasaki	11 June 1998 (aged 20)	(Japan Football Association) Kyoto Sanga
14	MF	Taishi Matsumoto	22 August 1998 (aged 19)	(Japan Football Association) Sanfrecce Hiroshima
16	MF	Kota Watanabe	18 October 1998 (aged 19)	(Japan Football Association) Tokyo Verdy
17	MF	Yuta Kamiya	24 April 1997 (aged 21)	(Japan Football Association) Ehime FC
9	FW	Reo Hatate	21 November 1997 (aged 20)	(Japan Football Association) Juntendo University
15	FW	Ayase Ueda	28 August 1998 (aged 19)	(Japan Football Association) Hosei University
18	FW	Daizen Maeda	20 October 1997 (aged 20)	(Japan Football Association) Matsumoto Yamaga

* Over-aged player.

=== Nepal ===
The following is the Nepal squad in the men's football tournament of the 2018 Asian Games. The team of 20 players was officially named on 24 June.

Head coach: (Japan) Koji Gyotoku

No.	Pos.	Player	Date of birth (age)	Club
4	DF	Ananta Tamang	14 January 1998 (aged 20)	(All Nepal Football Association) Three Star
6	DF	Aditya Chaudhary	19 April 1996 (aged 22)	(All Nepal Football Association) Armed Police Force
8	MF	Bishal Rai*	6 June 1993 (aged 25)	(All Nepal Football Association) Manang Marshyangdi
9	FW	Suman Lama	9 March 1996 (aged 22)	(All Nepal Football Association) Nepal Police
10	FW	Bimal Gharti Magar	26 January 1998 (aged 20)	(All Nepal Football Association) Three Star
11	MF	Heman Gurung	27 February 1996 (aged 22)	(All Nepal Football Association) Manang Marshyangdi
12	MF	Tej Tamang	14 February 1998 (aged 20)	(All Nepal Football Association) Nepal Police
13	DF	Kamal Shrestha	10 July 1997 (aged 21)	(All Nepal Football Association) Manang Marshyangdi
14	FW	Anjan Bista	15 May 1998 (aged 20)	(All Nepal Football Association) Armed Police Force
16	GK	Kiran Chemjong* (captain)	24 March 1990 (aged 28)	(Football Association of Maldives) TC Sports Club
19	GK	Alan Neupane	24 June 1996 (aged 22)	(All Nepal Football Association) Three Star
22	DF	Dinesh Rajbanshi	4 April 1998 (aged 20)	(All Nepal Football Association) Nepal Police
23	MF	Sunil Bal	1 January 1998 (aged 20)	(All Nepal Football Association) Three Star
24	DF	Tshring Gurung	21 February 1998 (aged 20)	(All Nepal Football Association) Chyasal Youth
25	DF	Suman Aryal	9 March 1996 (aged 22)	(All Nepal Football Association) Nepal Police
27	FW	Abhishek Rijal	29 January 2000 (aged 18)	(All Nepal Football Association) Nepal Police
30	MF	Hemant Thapa Magar	7 January 1998 (aged 20)	(All Nepal Football Association) Chyasal Youth
32	DF	Rohit Chand*	28 February 1992 (aged 26)	(Football Association of Indonesia) Persija Jakarta
33	GK	Sojit Gurung	28 January 2000 (aged 18)	(All Nepal Football Association) Mai Valley
35	MF	Gaurab Budhathoki	14 February 1998 (aged 20)	(All Nepal Football Association) Chyasal Youth

* Over-aged player.

=== Pakistan ===
The following is the Pakistan squad in the men's football tournament of the 2018 Asian Games. The team of 20 players was officially named on 10 August.

Head coach: (Brazil) José Antonio Nogueira

No.	Pos.	Player	Date of birth (age)	Club
2	DF	Umar Hayat	22 September 1996 (aged 21)	(Pakistan Football Federation) WAPDA
3	DF	Mohsin Ali	1 June 1996 (aged 22)	(Pakistan Football Federation) WAPDA
4	DF	Mehdi Hassan	20 July 1999 (aged 19)	(Pakistan Football Federation) Air Force
6	DF	Muhammad Bilal	14 August 1996 (aged 21)	(Pakistan Football Federation) WAPDA
7	FW	Mansoor Khan	20 February 1997 (aged 21)	(Pakistan Football Federation) Air Force
8	MF	Mehmood Khan*	10 June 1991 (aged 27)	(Pakistan Football Federation) Sui Southern Gas Company
9	MF	Yousaf Ahmed	6 November 1997 (aged 20)	(Pakistan Football Federation) KRL
10	MF	Muhammad Riaz	27 February 1996 (aged 22)	(Pakistan Football Federation) K-Electric
11	FW	Maqbool	4 April 1997 (aged 21)	(Pakistan Football Federation) NBP
13	DF	Shahbaz Younas	2 March 1996 (aged 22)	(Pakistan Football Federation) Army
14	DF	Ali Khan Niazi	14 December 2000 (aged 17)	(Pakistan Football Federation) K-Electric
15	MF	Zain ul Abideen Ishaque	24 May 1998 (aged 20)	(Pakistan Football Federation) K-Electric
16	DF	Waseem Asghar	8 July 2000 (aged 18)	(Pakistan Football Federation) Civil Aviation Authority
17	MF	Saddam Hussain* (captain)	10 April 1993 (aged 25)	(Pakistan Football Federation) Sui Southern Gas Company
18	DF	Arslan Ali	20 December 1998 (aged 19)	(Pakistan Football Federation) KRL
19	MF	Adeel Ali	5 January 2000 (aged 18)	(Pakistan Football Federation) WAPDA
20	MF	Sohail Khan	1 January 1996 (aged 22)	(Pakistan Football Federation) Air Force
22	GK	Ahsanullah Ahmed	25 February 1995 (aged 23)	(Pakistan Football Federation) Sui Southern Gas Company
23	FW	Noman Noor	10 September 1997 (aged 20)	(Pakistan Football Federation) K-Electric
33	GK	Saqib Hanif* (vice-captain)	28 April 1994 (aged 24)	(Football Association of Maldives) Maalhos

* Over-aged player.

=== Vietnam ===
The following is the Vietnam squad in the men's football tournament of the 2018 Asian Games. The team of 20 players was officially named on 19 July.

Head coach: (South Korea) Park Hang-seo

No.	Pos.	Player	Date of birth (age)	Caps	Goals	Club
1	GK	Nguyễn Văn Hoàng	17 February 1995 (aged 23)			(Vietnam Football Federation) Sài Gòn
50	GK	Bùi Tiến Dũng	28 February 1997 (aged 21)			(Vietnam Football Federation) FLC Thanh Hóa
2	DF	Phạm Xuân Mạnh	9 February 1996 (aged 22)			(Vietnam Football Federation) Sông Lam Nghệ An
3	DF	Đỗ Duy Mạnh	29 September 1996 (aged 21)			(Vietnam Football Federation) Hà Nội
4	DF	Bùi Tiến Dũng	2 October 1995 (aged 22)			(Vietnam Football Federation) Viettel
5	DF	Đoàn Văn Hậu	19 April 1999 (aged 19)			(Vietnam Football Federation) Hà Nội
7	DF	Trịnh Văn Lợi	26 May 1995 (aged 23)			(Vietnam Football Federation) Hải Phòng
21	DF	Trần Đình Trọng	25 April 1997 (aged 21)			(Vietnam Football Federation) Hà Nội
6	MF	Lương Xuân Trường	28 April 1995 (aged 23)			(Vietnam Football Federation) Hoàng Anh Gia Lai
9	MF	Nguyễn Công Phượng	21 January 1995 (aged 23)			(Vietnam Football Federation) Hoàng Anh Gia Lai
10	MF	Nguyễn Văn Quyết* (captain)	1 July 1991 (aged 27)			(Vietnam Football Federation) Hà Nội
15	MF	Phạm Đức Huy	20 January 1995 (aged 23)			(Vietnam Football Federation) Hà Nội
16	MF	Trần Minh Vương	28 March 1995 (aged 23)			(Vietnam Football Federation) Hoàng Anh Gia Lai
17	MF	Vũ Văn Thanh	14 April 1996 (aged 22)			(Vietnam Football Federation) Hoàng Anh Gia Lai
18	MF	Đỗ Hùng Dũng*	8 September 1993 (aged 24)			(Vietnam Football Federation) Hà Nội
19	MF	Nguyễn Quang Hải	12 April 1997 (aged 21)			(Vietnam Football Federation) Hà Nội
20	MF	Phan Văn Đức	11 April 1996 (aged 22)			(Vietnam Football Federation) Sông Lam Nghệ An
8	FW	Nguyễn Văn Toàn	12 April 1996 (aged 22)			(Vietnam Football Federation) Hoàng Anh Gia Lai
11	FW	Nguyễn Anh Đức*	24 October 1985 (aged 32)			(Vietnam Football Federation) Becamex Bình Dương
13	FW	Hà Đức Chinh	22 September 1997 (aged 20)			(Vietnam Football Federation) SHB Đà Nẵng

* Over-aged player.

== Group E ==
=== Bahrain ===
The following is the Bahrain squad in the men's football tournament of the 2018 Asian Games.

Head coach: (Tunisia) Samir Chammam

No.	Pos.	Player	Date of birth (age)	Caps	Goals	Club
1	GK	Abdulaziz Al-Kandari	16 September 1997 (aged 20)			(Bahrain Football Association) Isa Town
19	GK	Ammar Ahmed	10 February 1999 (aged 19)			(Bahrain Football Association) Manama
20	GK	Yusuf Habib	9 January 1998 (aged 20)			(Bahrain Football Association) Malkiya
2	DF	Sayed Mohamed Ameen	7 March 1999 (aged 19)			(Bahrain Football Association) Sitra
3	DF	Ahmed Bughammar	30 December 1997 (aged 20)			(Bahrain Football Association) Al-Hidd
4	DF	Husain Jameel	3 October 1997 (aged 20)			(Bahrain Football Association) Al-Shabab
5	DF	Hamad Al-Shamsan	29 September 1997 (aged 20)			(Bahrain Football Association) Al-Riffa
6	DF	Abbas Al-Khayyat	15 October 1997 (aged 20)			(Bahrain Football Association) East Riffa
15	DF	Hasan Al-Karani	27 November 1997 (aged 20)			(Bahrain Football Association) Sitra
7	MF	Hasan Yahya Ali	29 November 1997 (aged 20)			(Bahrain Football Association) Al-Tadamun Buri
8	MF	Mohamed Jasim Marhoon	12 February 1998 (aged 20)			(Bahrain Football Association) Al-Riffa
9	MF	Saleh Sanad	11 January 1998 (aged 20)			(Bahrain Football Association) Isa Town
10	MF	Mohammed Al-Hardan (captain)	6 October 1997 (aged 20)			(Danish Football Association) Vejle Boldklub
11	MF	Abdulaziz Al-Mansoori	17 March 1997 (aged 21)			(Bahrain Football Association) Al-Najma
12	MF	Jasim Al-Salama	22 February 1998 (aged 20)			(Bahrain Football Association) East Riffa
14	MF	Abbas Al-Asfoor	2 March 1999 (aged 19)			(Bahrain Football Association) Al-Shabab
18	MF	Abdulrahman Ahmadi	16 April 1998 (aged 20)			(Bahrain Football Association) Al-Muharraq
13	FW	Sayed Ebrahim	25 October 1997 (aged 20)			(Bahrain Football Association) Al-Shabab
16	FW	Sayed Hashim Isa	3 April 1998 (aged 20)			(Bahrain Football Association) Malkiya
17	FW	Ahmed Al-Sherooqi	22 May 2000 (aged 18)			(Bahrain Football Association) Al-Budaiya

* Over-aged player.

=== Kyrgyzstan ===
The following is the Kyrgyzstan squad in the men's football tournament of the 2018 Asian Games.

Head coach: (Kyrgyzstan) Igor Kudarenko

No.	Pos.	Player	Date of birth (age)	Caps	Goals	Club
1	GK	Kalysbek Akimaliev*	16 November 1992 (aged 25)			(Kyrgyz Football Union) Abdysh-Ata
13	GK	Kutman Kadyrbekov	13 June 1997 (aged 21)			(Kyrgyz Football Union) Dordoi
2	DF	Mustafa Iusupov	1 July 1995 (aged 23)			(Kyrgyz Football Union) Dordoi
3	DF	Tamirlan Kozubaev* (captain)	1 July 1994 (aged 24)			(Kyrgyz Football Union) Dordoi
4	DF	Askarbek Saliev	25 May 1995 (aged 23)			(Kyrgyz Football Union) Dordoi
5	DF	Aizar Akmatov	24 August 1998 (aged 19)			(Kyrgyz Football Union) Alga
6	DF	Azat Murzashev	18 January 1997 (aged 21)			(Kyrgyz Football Union) Abdysh-Ata
19	DF	Andrei Dolzhenko	23 August 1995 (aged 22)			(Kyrgyz Football Union) Ilbirs
7	MF	Atay Dzhumashev	21 February 1998 (aged 20)			(Kyrgyz Football Union) Neftchi
8	MF	Azim Azarov	20 September 1996 (aged 21)			(Kyrgyz Football Union) Dordoi
10	MF	Odiljon Abdurakhmanov	18 March 1996 (aged 22)			(Kyrgyz Football Union) Alay
14	MF	Davliatzhan Baratov	17 January 1995 (aged 23)			(Kyrgyz Football Union) Alay
15	MF	Kurmantai Nurtay	9 July 1997 (aged 21)			(Kyrgyz Football Union) Ilbirs
16	MF	Eldiyar Sardarbekov	5 April 1995 (aged 23)			(Kyrgyz Football Union) Alay
17	MF	Temirbolot Tapaev	1 August 1999 (aged 19)			(Kyrgyz Football Union) Dordoi
9	FW	Kadyrbek Shaarbekov	2 February 1998 (aged 20)			(Kyrgyz Football Union) Dordoi
11	FW	Kairat Zhyrgalbek Uulu*	13 June 1993 (aged 25)			(Kyrgyz Football Union) Dordoi
12	FW	Amanbek Manybekov	5 August 1995 (aged 23)			(Kyrgyz Football Union) Abdysh-Ata
18	FW	Ernist Batyrkanov	21 February 1998 (aged 20)			(Kyrgyz Football Union) Dordoi

* Over-aged player.

=== Malaysia ===
The following is the Malaysia squad in the men's football tournament of the 2018 Asian Games. The team of 20 players was officially named on 12 August. Danial Amier Norhisham was replaced by Rodney Celvin on 13 August.

Head coach: (Malaysia) Ong Kim Swee

No.	Pos.	Player	Date of birth (age)	Caps	Goals	Club
1	GK	Ifwat Akmal	10 August 1996 (aged 22)			(Football Association of Malaysia) Kedah
22	GK	Haziq Nadzli	6 January 1998 (aged 20)			(Football Association of Malaysia) Johor Darul Ta'zim
2	DF	Adib Zainudin	15 February 1995 (aged 23)			(Football Association of Malaysia) Johor Darul Ta'zim II
3	DF	Syazwan Bahari	24 February 1995 (aged 23)			(Football Association of Malaysia) Perak
4	DF	Rodney Celvin	25 November 1996 (aged 21)			(Football Association of Malaysia) PKNS
9	DF	Adam Nor Azlin (vice-captain)	5 January 1996 (aged 22)			(Football Association of Malaysia) Johor Darul Ta'zim
14	DF	Dominic Tan	12 March 1997 (aged 21)			(Football Association of Malaysia) Johor Darul Ta'zim
15	DF	Rizal Ghazali*	1 October 1992 (aged 25)			(Football Association of Malaysia) Kedah
17	DF	Irfan Zakaria	4 June 1995 (aged 23)			(Football Association of Malaysia) Kuala Lumpur
21	DF	Syazwan Andik	4 August 1996 (aged 22)			(Football Association of Malaysia) Kuala Lumpur
5	MF	Syahmi Safari	5 February 1998 (aged 20)			(Football Association of Malaysia) Selangor
7	MF	Baddrol Bakhtiar* (captain)	1 February 1988 (aged 30)			(Football Association of Malaysia) Kedah
8	MF	Faisal Halim	7 January 1998 (aged 20)			(Football Association of Malaysia) Pahang
13	MF	Tommy Mawat Bada	26 June 1995 (aged 23)			(Football Association of Malaysia) PJ Rangers
16	MF	Nik Akif	11 May 1999 (aged 19)			(Football Association of Malaysia) Kelantan U21
10	FW	Hadi Fayyadh	22 January 2000 (aged 18)			(Football Association of Malaysia) Johor Darul Ta'zim II
11	FW	Safawi Rasid	5 March 1997 (aged 21)			(Football Association of Malaysia) Johor Darul Ta'zim
18	FW	Akhyar Rashid	1 May 1999 (aged 19)			(Football Association of Malaysia) Kedah
19	FW	Kogileswaran Raj	21 September 1998 (aged 19)			(Football Association of Malaysia) Pahang
20	FW	Syafiq Ahmad	28 June 1995 (aged 23)			(Football Association of Malaysia) Johor Darul Ta'zim

* Over-aged player.

=== South Korea ===
The following is the South Korea squad in the men's football tournament of the 2018 Asian Games. The team of 20 players was officially named on 16 July.

Head coach: (South Korea) Kim Hak-bum

No.	Pos.	Player	Date of birth (age)	Caps	Goals	Club
1	GK	Song Bum-keun	15 October 1997 (aged 20)	3	0	(Korea Football Association) Jeonbuk Hyundai Motors
18	GK	Jo Hyeon-woo*	25 September 1991 (aged 26)	2	0	(Korea Football Association) Daegu FC
2	DF	Hwang Hyun-soo	22 July 1995 (aged 23)	7	1	(Korea Football Association) FC Seoul
3	DF	Kim Min-jae	15 November 1996 (aged 21)	2	0	(Korea Football Association) Jeonbuk Hyundai Motors
4	DF	Kim Jin-ya	30 June 1998 (aged 20)	2	0	(Korea Football Association) Incheon United
5	DF	Jeong Tae-wook	16 May 1997 (aged 21)	3	1	(Korea Football Association) Jeju United
6	DF	Kim Moon-hwan	1 August 1995 (aged 23)	6	0	(Korea Football Association) Busan IPark
12	DF	Lee Si-young	21 April 1997 (aged 21)	1	0	(Korea Football Association) Seongnam FC
8	MF	Lee Jin-hyun	26 August 1997 (aged 20)	4	0	(Korea Football Association) Pohang Steelers
10	MF	Hwang In-beom	20 September 1996 (aged 21)	4	2	(Korea Football Association) Asan Mugunghwa
13	MF	Cho Yu-min	17 November 1996 (aged 21)	5	0	(Korea Football Association) Suwon FC
14	MF	Jang Yun-ho (vice-captain)	25 August 1996 (aged 21)	6	0	(Korea Football Association) Jeonbuk Hyundai Motors
15	MF	Lee Seung-mo	30 March 1998 (aged 20)	2	0	(Korea Football Association) Gwangju FC
19	MF	Kim Geon-ung	29 August 1997 (aged 20)	1	0	(Korea Football Association) Ulsan Hyundai
20	MF	Kim Jung-min	13 November 1999 (aged 18)	1	0	(Austrian Football Association) FC Liefering
7	FW	Son Heung-min* (captain)	8 July 1992 (aged 26)	4	2	(The Football Association) Tottenham Hotspur
9	FW	Hwang Hee-chan	26 January 1996 (aged 22)	16	2	(Austrian Football Association) Red Bull Salzburg
11	FW	Na Sang-ho	12 August 1996 (aged 21)	1	0	(Korea Football Association) Gwangju FC
16	FW	Hwang Ui-jo*	28 August 1992 (aged 25)	15	5	(Japan Football Association) Gamba Osaka
17	FW	Lee Seung-woo	6 January 1998 (aged 20)	0	0	(Italian Football Federation) Hellas Verona

* Over-aged player.

== Group F ==
=== Iran ===
The following is the Iran squad in the men's football tournament of the 2018 Asian Games. The team of 20 players was officially named on 31 July.

Head coach: (Croatia) Zlatko Kranjčar

No.	Pos.	Player	Date of birth (age)	Club
1	GK	Mehdi Amini (captain)	16 May 1996 (aged 22)	(Football Federation Islamic Republic of Iran) Paykan
12	GK	Shahab Adeli	19 January 1997 (aged 21)	(Football Federation Islamic Republic of Iran) Sepahan
2	DF	Mohammad Aghajanpour	20 April 1997 (aged 21)	(Football Federation Islamic Republic of Iran) Padideh
3	DF	Mohammad Moslemipour	25 May 1997 (aged 21)	(Football Federation Islamic Republic of Iran) Tractor Sazi
4	DF	Mehdi Rahimi	2 May 1999 (aged 19)	(Football Federation Islamic Republic of Iran) Sepahan
5	DF	Alireza Arta	4 February 1997 (aged 21)	(Football Federation Islamic Republic of Iran) Mes Kerman
18	DF	Shahin Abbasian	16 June 1997 (aged 21)	(Football Federation Islamic Republic of Iran) Persepolis
20	DF	Aref Aghasi	2 January 1997 (aged 21)	(Football Federation Islamic Republic of Iran) Foolad
6	MF	Mohammad Soltani Mehr	4 February 1999 (aged 19)	(Football Federation Islamic Republic of Iran) Saipa
7	MF	Younes Delfi	2 October 2000 (aged 17)	(Football Federation Islamic Republic of Iran) Esteghlal Khuzestan
9	MF	Mohammad Mehdi Mehdikhani	28 July 1997 (aged 21)	(Football Federation Islamic Republic of Iran) Padideh
11	MF	Mehdi Ghaedi	5 December 1998 (aged 19)	(Football Federation Islamic Republic of Iran) Esteghlal
13	MF	Abolfazl Razzaghpour	17 September 1997 (aged 20)	(Football Federation Islamic Republic of Iran) Paykan
15	MF	Ahmadreza Ahmadvand	6 February 1999 (aged 19)	(Football Federation Islamic Republic of Iran) Esteghlal
17	MF	Sina Zamehran	10 March 1997 (aged 21)	(Football Federation Islamic Republic of Iran) Padideh
19	MF	Mohammad Khodabandelou	7 September 1999 (aged 18)	(Football Federation Islamic Republic of Iran) Paykan
8	FW	Mohammad Amin Asadi	24 December 1998 (aged 19)	(Football Federation Islamic Republic of Iran) Persepolis
10	FW	Mohammad Reza Azadi	7 December 1999 (aged 18)	(Football Federation Islamic Republic of Iran) Tractor Sazi
14	FW	Reza Jabireh	7 July 1997 (aged 21)	(Football Federation Islamic Republic of Iran) Sanat Naft Abadan
16	FW	Amir Roustaei	5 August 1997 (aged 21)	(Football Federation Islamic Republic of Iran) Paykan

=== Myanmar ===
The following is the Myanmar squad in the men's football tournament of the 2018 Asian Games.

Head coach: (Germany) Antoine Hey

No.	Pos.	Player	Date of birth (age)	Caps	Goals	Club
1	GK	Kyaw Zin Htet*	2 March 1987 (aged 31)			(Myanmar Football Federation) Yangon United
25	GK	Sann Satt Naing	4 November 1997 (aged 20)			(Myanmar Football Federation) Yangon United
2	DF	Htike Htike Aung	1 February 1995 (aged 23)			(Myanmar Football Federation) Shan United
3	DF	Zaw Min Tun* (captain)	20 May 1992 (aged 26)			(Myanmar Football Federation) Yangon United
4	DF	Win Moe Kyaw	1 February 1997 (aged 21)			(Myanmar Football Federation) Magwe
5	DF	Nanda Kyaw	3 September 1996 (aged 21)			(Myanmar Football Federation) Magwe
13	DF	Ye Yint Aung	26 February 1998 (aged 20)			(Myanmar Football Federation) Yadanarbon
15	DF	Soe Moe Kyaw	23 March 1999 (aged 19)			(Myanmar Football Federation) ISPE
23	DF	Hein Phyo Win	19 September 1998 (aged 19)			(Myanmar Football Federation) Shan United
6	MF	Hlaing Bo Bo	8 July 1996 (aged 22)			(Myanmar Football Federation) Yadanarbon
8	MF	Maung Maung Soe	6 August 1995 (aged 23)			(Myanmar Football Federation) Magwe
11	MF	Maung Maung Lwin	18 June 1995 (aged 23)			(Myanmar Football Federation) Yangon United
12	MF	Myat Kaung Khant	15 July 2000 (aged 18)			(Myanmar Football Federation) Yadanarbon
14	MF	Yan Naing Oo	31 March 1996 (aged 22)			(Myanmar Football Federation) Shan United
16	MF	Sithu Aung	16 October 1996 (aged 21)			(Myanmar Football Federation) Yadanarbon
19	MF	Htet Phyo Wai	21 January 2000 (aged 18)			(Myanmar Football Federation) Shan United
22	MF	Min Kyaw Khant	28 June 1995 (aged 23)			(Myanmar Football Federation) Yangon United
26	MF	Lwin Moe Aung	10 December 1999 (aged 18)			(Myanmar Football Federation) ISPE
9	FW	Dway Ko Ko Chit*	23 June 1993 (aged 25)			(Myanmar Football Federation) Shan United
10	FW	Aung Thu	22 May 1996 (aged 22)			(Football Association of Thailand) Police Tero

* Over-aged player.

=== North Korea ===
The following is the North Korea squad in the men's football tournament of the 2018 Asian Games.

Head coach: Ju Song-il

No.	Pos.	Player	Date of birth (age)	Caps	Goals	Club
1	GK	Kim Yu-il	30 January 1997 (aged 21)			(DPR Korea Football Association) Kigwancha
18	GK	Kang Ju-hyok	31 May 1997 (aged 21)			(DPR Korea Football Association) Hwaebul
2	DF	An Song-il	5 August 1996 (aged 22)			(DPR Korea Football Association) April 25
3	DF	Song Kum-song (captain)	23 August 1995 (aged 22)			(DPR Korea Football Association) Rimyongsu
5	DF	Kim Nam-il	1 January 1996 (aged 22)			(DPR Korea Football Association) Ryomyong
19	DF	Jong Tong-chol	21 April 1997 (aged 21)			(DPR Korea Football Association) Rimyongsu
21	DF	Kim Chol-bom*	16 July 1994 (aged 24)			(DPR Korea Football Association) April 25
22	DF	Jang Kuk-chol*	16 February 1994 (aged 24)			(DPR Korea Football Association) Hwaebul
4	MF	Ri Un-chol	13 July 1995 (aged 23)			(DPR Korea Football Association) Sonbong
6	MF	Kim Kuk-bom	19 February 1995 (aged 23)			(DPR Korea Football Association) April 25
7	MF	Jo Kwang-myong	3 January 1995 (aged 23)			(DPR Korea Football Association) April 25
13	MF	Ju Kyong-chol	14 November 1997 (aged 20)			
14	MF	Kim Kum-chol	7 April 1997 (aged 21)			(DPR Korea Football Association) Rimyongsu
15	MF	Kim Chung-il	21 August 1997 (aged 20)			
17	MF	Kang Kuk-chol	29 September 1999 (aged 18)			(DPR Korea Football Association) Rimyongsu
25	MF	Ryang Hyon-ju	31 May 1998 (aged 20)			(Japan Football Association) Waseda University
12	FW	Han Yong-thae	30 October 1996 (aged 21)			(Japan Football Association) Korea University
16	FW	Kim Yong-il*	6 July 1994 (aged 24)			(DPR Korea Football Association) Kigwancha
20	FW	So Jong-hyok	1 July 1995 (aged 23)			(DPR Korea Football Association) April 25
23	FW	Kim Yu-song	24 January 1995 (aged 23)			(DPR Korea Football Association) April 25

* Over-aged player.

=== Saudi Arabia ===
The following is the Saudi Arabia squad in the men's football tournament of the 2018 Asian Games.

Head coach: (Saudi Arabia) Saad Al-Shehri

No.	Pos.	Player	Date of birth (age)	Caps	Goals	Club
1	GK	Amin Al Bukhari	2 May 1997 (aged 21)			(Saudi Arabian Football Federation) Al-Ittihad
21	GK	Saleh Al Ohaymid	21 May 1998 (aged 20)			(Saudi Arabian Football Federation) Al-Nassr
22	GK	Mohammed Al Rubaie	14 August 1997 (aged 20)			(Saudi Arabian Football Federation) Al-Batin
2	DF	Abdullah Hassoun	19 March 1997 (aged 21)			(Saudi Arabian Football Federation) Al-Ahli
3	DF	Mohammed Bassas	31 August 1998 (aged 19)			(Saudi Arabian Football Federation) Al-Ahli
4	DF	Abdullah Al-Yousef	29 October 1997 (aged 20)			(Saudi Arabian Football Federation) Al-Fateh
5	DF	Abdulelah Al-Amri	15 January 1997 (aged 21)			(Saudi Arabian Football Federation) Al-Wehda
12	DF	Mohammed Al-Zubaidi	25 August 1997 (aged 20)			(Saudi Arabian Football Federation) Al-Ahli
13	DF	Awn Al-Saluli (captain)	2 September 1998 (aged 19)			(Saudi Arabian Football Federation) Al-Ittihad
6	MF	Yousef Al-Harbi	16 March 1997 (aged 21)			(Saudi Arabian Football Federation) Al-Ahli
7	MF	Abdulrahman Ghareeb	31 March 1997 (aged 21)			(Saudi Arabian Football Federation) Al-Ahli
8	MF	Abdullah Majrashi	24 August 1997 (aged 20)			(Saudi Arabian Football Federation) Al-Ahli
10	MF	Ayman Al-Khulaif	22 May 1997 (aged 21)			(Saudi Arabian Football Federation) Al-Ahli
11	MF	Saad Al-Selouli	25 May 1998 (aged 20)			(Saudi Arabian Football Federation) Al-Ettifaq
14	MF	Ali Al-Asmari	12 January 1997 (aged 21)			(Saudi Arabian Football Federation) Ohod
16	MF	Abdurahman Al-Dossari	25 September 1997 (aged 20)			(Saudi Arabian Football Federation) Al-Nassr
17	MF	Nasser Al Omran	13 July 1997 (aged 21)			(Saudi Arabian Football Federation) Al-Shabab
18	MF	Nawaf Al Habashi	23 June 1998 (aged 20)			(Saudi Arabian Football Federation) Al-Shabab
9	FW	Haroune Camara	1 January 1998 (aged 20)			(Saudi Arabian Football Federation) Al-Qadsiah
20	FW	Muteb Al-Hammad	13 August 1998 (aged 19)			(Saudi Arabian Football Federation) Al-Batin

* Over-aged player.

== See also ==
- Football at the 2018 Asian Games – Women's team squads
