= 2018 AFC U-23 Championship squads =

The following is a list of squads for each national team which competed at the 2018 AFC U-23 Championship. The tournament took place in China, between 9–27 January 2018. It was the third U-23 age group competition organised by the Asian Football Confederation. As the tournament was not held during the FIFA International Match Calendar, clubs were not obligated to release the players.

The sixteen national teams involved in the tournament were required to register a squad of 23 players, including three goalkeepers. Only players in these squads were eligible to take part in the tournament. Players born on or after 1 January 1995 were eligible to compete in the tournament.

The full squad listings are below. The age listed for each player is on 9 January 2018, the first day of the tournament. The nationality for each club reflects the national association (not the league) to which the club is affiliated. A flag is included for coaches who are of a different nationality than their own national team. Players in boldface have been capped at full international level at some point in their career.

== Group A ==
=== China PR ===
Coach: (Italy) Massimiliano Maddaloni

The final squad was announced on 4 January 2018.

No.	Pos.	Player	Date of birth (age)	Club
1	GK	Li Zheng	18 March 1997 (aged 20)	(Portuguese Football Federation) Gondomar
2	DF	**Huang Zhengyu**	24 January 1997 (aged 20)	(Chinese Football Association) Guangzhou R&F
3	MF	Li Xiaoming	19 January 1996 (aged 21)	(Chinese Football Association) Shanghai Shenhua
4	DF	**Liu Yang**	17 June 1995 (aged 22)	(Chinese Football Association) Shandong Luneng
5	DF	**Gao Zhunyi**	21 August 1995 (aged 22)	(Chinese Football Association) Hebei China Fortune
6	MF	**Yao Junsheng**	29 October 1995 (aged 22)	(Chinese Football Association) Shandong Luneng
7	FW	**Wei Shihao**	8 April 1995 (aged 22)	(Chinese Football Association) Beijing Guoan
8	MF	**He Chao**	19 April 1995 (aged 22)	(Chinese Football Association) Changchun Yatai
9	FW	**Zhang Yuning**	5 January 1997 (aged 21)	(German Football Association) Werder Bremen
10	FW	Tang Shi	24 January 1995 (aged 22)	(Chinese Football Association) Guangzhou Evergrande
11	MF	Zhang Yuan	28 January 1997 (aged 20)	(Chinese Football Association) Tianjin Quanjian
12	GK	Zhou Yuchen	12 January 1995 (aged 22)	(Football Association of Hong Kong, China) R&F
13	DF	Li Hailong	2 August 1996 (aged 21)	(Chinese Football Association) Shandong Luneng
14	MF	Nie Aoshuang	16 January 1995 (aged 22)	(Chinese Football Association) Wuhan Zall
15	FW	Hu Jinghang	23 March 1997 (aged 20)	(Chinese Football Association) Shanghai SIPG
16	DF	**Li Shuai**	18 June 1995 (aged 22)	(Chinese Football Association) Dalian Yifang
17	FW	**Yang Liyu**	13 February 1997 (aged 20)	(Chinese Football Association) Guangzhou Evergrande
18	FW	Liu Ruofan	28 January 1999 (aged 18)	(Chinese Football Association) Shanghai Shenhua
20	MF	Nan Song	21 June 1997 (aged 20)	(Korea Football Association) Bucheon FC 1995
21	DF	**Deng Hanwen**	8 January 1995 (aged 23)	(Chinese Football Association) Guangzhou Evergrande
22	FW	**Ba Dun**	16 September 1995 (aged 22)	(Chinese Football Association) Beijing Guoan
23	GK	Chen Wei	14 February 1998 (aged 19)	(Chinese Football Association) Shanghai SIPG

=== Qatar ===
Coach: (Spain) Félix Sánchez Bas

The final squad was announced on 1 January 2018.

No.	Pos.	Player	Date of birth (age)	Club
1	GK	**Yousef Hassan**	24 May 1996 (aged 21)	(Qatar Football Association) Al-Gharafa
2	MF	**Tarek Salman**	5 December 1997 (aged 20)	(Royal Spanish Football Federation) Astorga
3	DF	Salah Al-Yahri	25 August 1995 (aged 22)	(Qatar Football Association) Al-Khor
4	MF	Omar Al-Amadi	5 April 1995 (aged 22)	(Qatar Football Association) Qatar SC
5	DF	**Tameem Al-Muhaza**	21 July 1996 (aged 21)	(Qatar Football Association) Al-Gharafa
6	MF	**Abdullah Al-Ahrak**	10 May 1997 (aged 20)	(Qatar Football Association) Al-Duhail
7	MF	**Khalid Muneer**	24 February 1998 (aged 19)	(Royal Spanish Football Federation) Astorga
8	MF	**Ahmed Moein**	20 October 1995 (aged 22)	(Royal Spanish Football Federation) Leonesa
9	FW	Meshaal Al-Shammeri	19 January 1995 (aged 22)	(Qatar Football Association) Al Sadd
10	MF	**Akram Afif**	18 November 1996 (aged 21)	(Royal Belgian Football Association) Eupen
11	MF	Nasser Al-Nassr	11 July 1995 (aged 22)	(Qatar Football Association) Al-Markhiya
12	DF	**Ahmed Al-Hamawende**	8 February 1999 (aged 18)	(Qatar Football Association) Al Sadd
13	DF	**Sultan Al-Brake**	7 April 1996 (aged 21)	(Qatar Football Association) Al-Duhail
14	DF	Yousef Aymen	21 March 1999 (aged 18)	(Qatar Football Association) Al-Duhail
15	DF	**Bassam Al-Rawi**	16 December 1997 (aged 20)	(Qatar Football Association) Al-Duhail
16	DF	**Hashim Ali Abdullatif**	17 August 2000 (aged 17)	(Qatar Football Association) Al Sadd
17	MF	**Abdurahman Mostafa**	5 April 1997 (aged 20)	(Qatar Football Association) Al-Duhail
18	MF	**Assim Madibo**	22 October 1996 (aged 21)	(Royal Belgian Football Association) Eupen
19	FW	**Almoez Ali**	19 August 1996 (aged 21)	(Qatar Football Association) Al-Duhail
20	DF	**Salem Al-Hajri**	10 April 1996 (aged 21)	(Qatar Football Association) Al Sadd
21	GK	**Meshaal Barsham**	14 February 1998 (aged 19)	(Qatar Football Association) Al Sadd
22	GK	**Mohammed Al-Bakari**	28 March 1997 (aged 20)	(Qatar Football Association) Al-Duhail
23	MF	**Khalid Mohammed**	7 June 2000 (aged 17)	(Qatar Football Association) Al-Duhail

=== Uzbekistan ===
Coach: Ravshan Khaydarov

The final squad was announced on 4 January 2018.

No.	Pos.	Player	Date of birth (age)	Club
1	GK	**Botirali Ergashev**	23 June 1995 (aged 22)	(Uzbekistan Football Association) Pakhtakor Tashkent
2	DF	**Rustam Ashurmatov**	7 July 1996 (aged 21)	(Uzbekistan Football Association) Bunyodkor
3	DF	**Khojiakbar Alijonov**	19 April 1997 (aged 20)	(Uzbekistan Football Association) Pakhtakor Tashkent
4	DF	**Akramjon Komilov**	14 March 1996 (aged 21)	(Uzbekistan Football Association) Bunyodkor
5	DF	**Abbos Otakhonov**	25 August 1995 (aged 22)	(Uzbekistan Football Association) Navbahor Namangan
6	MF	**Azizjon Ganiev**	22 February 1998 (aged 19)	(Uzbekistan Football Association) Nasaf
7	MF	**Odiljon Hamrobekov**	13 February 1996 (aged 21)	(Uzbekistan Football Association) Nasaf
8	MF	**Jasurbek Yakhshiboev**	24 June 1997 (aged 20)	(Uzbekistan Football Association) Pakhtakor Tashkent
9	FW	**Zabikhillo Urinboev**	30 March 1995 (aged 22)	(Uzbekistan Football Association) Pakhtakor Tashkent
10	MF	**Javokhir Sidikov**	8 December 1996 (aged 21)	(Uzbekistan Football Association) Kokand 1912
11	FW	**Andrey Sidorov**	25 May 1995 (aged 22)	(Uzbekistan Football Association) Kokand 1912
12	GK	Dilshod Xamroev	11 July 1995 (aged 22)	(Uzbekistan Football Association) Navbahor Namangan
13	DF	**Islom Kobilov**	1 June 1997 (aged 20)	(Uzbekistan Football Association) Bunyodkor
14	MF	Abdujamol Isroilov	24 December 1996 (aged 21)	(Uzbekistan Football Association) Neftchi Fergana
15	MF	Oybek Rustamov	2 April 1997 (aged 20)	(Uzbekistan Football Association) Kokand 1912
16	DF	Doniyorjon Narzullaev	11 April 1995 (aged 22)	(Uzbekistan Football Association) Nasaf
17	MF	**Dostonbek Khamdamov**	24 July 1996 (aged 21)	(Uzbekistan Football Association) Bunyodkor
18	DF	Xusniddin Gofurov	20 March 1997 (aged 20)	(Uzbekistan Football Association) Neftchi Fergana
19	MF	**Otabek Shukurov**	22 June 1996 (aged 21)	(United Arab Emirates Football Association) Sharjah
20	DF	**Dostonbek Tursunov**	13 June 1995 (aged 22)	(Uzbekistan Football Association) Neftchi Fergana
21	GK	Rahimjon Davronov	3 October 1996 (aged 21)	(Uzbekistan Football Association) Mash'al Mubarek
22	FW	**Bobur Abdikholikov**	23 April 1997 (aged 20)	(Uzbekistan Football Association) Nasaf
23	MF	Sukhrob Nurulloev	4 January 1998 (aged 20)	(Uzbekistan Football Association) Pakhtakor Tashkent

=== Oman ===
Coach: Hamad Al-Azani

The final squad was announced on 31 December 2017.

No.	Pos.	Player	Date of birth (age)	Club
1	GK	Ibrahim Al-Mukhaini	20 June 1997 (aged 20)	(Oman Football Association) Al-Orouba
2	MF	**Mataz Saleh**	28 May 1996 (aged 21)	(Oman Football Association) Dhofar
3	DF	Majid Al-Saadi	9 May 1996 (aged 21)	(Oman Football Association) Al-Mussanah
4	DF	**Juma Al-Habsi**	28 January 1996 (aged 21)	(Oman Football Association) Al-Seeb
5	DF	Thani Al-Rushaidi	16 March 1995 (aged 22)	(Oman Football Association) Saham
6	MF	**Abdullah Fawaz**	3 October 1996 (aged 21)	(Oman Football Association) Dhofar
7	FW	**Rabia Al-Alawi**	31 March 1995 (aged 22)	(Oman Football Association) Oman Club
8	MF	**Jameel Al-Yahmadi**	27 July 1996 (aged 21)	(Oman Football Association) Al-Shabab
9	MF	Marwan Taaib	7 April 1996 (aged 21)	(Oman Football Association) Al-Seeb
10	MF	Azan Al-Tamtami	21 February 1995 (aged 22)	(Oman Football Association) Fanja
11	FW	**Muhsen Al-Ghassani**	27 March 1997 (aged 20)	(Oman Football Association) Al-Suwaiq
12	MF	Matasam Al-Mahijari	8 May 1997 (aged 20)	(Oman Football Association) Al-Orouba
13	MF	Hassan Al-Ajmi	4 March 1995 (aged 22)	(Oman Football Association) Sohar
14	DF	Maadh Al-Khaldi	25 October 1995 (aged 22)	(Oman Football Association) Saham
15	MF	**Ahmed Al-Kaabi**	15 September 1996 (aged 21)	(Oman Football Association) Al-Nahda
16	DF	Ahmed Al-Matroushi	26 May 1997 (aged 20)	(Oman Football Association) Al-Salam
17	DF	**Samir Al-Alawi**	8 August 1996 (aged 21)	(Oman Football Association) Al-Orouba
18	GK	Faris Al-Ghaithi	9 July 1996 (aged 21)	(Oman Football Association) Sohar
19	FW	**Zahir Al-Aghbari**	28 May 1999 (aged 18)	(Oman Football Association) Al-Seeb
20	FW	Yousuf Al-Mukhaini	20 March 1995 (aged 22)	(Oman Football Association) Al-Orouba
21	DF	**Abdulaziz Al-Gheilani**	14 May 1995 (aged 22)	(Oman Football Association) Sur
22	GK	Bilal Al-Balushi	29 May 1996 (aged 21)	(Oman Football Association) Oman Club
23	MF	Ibrahim Al-Sawwafi	22 March 1996 (aged 21)	(Oman Football Association) Bosher

== Group B ==
=== Japan ===
Coach: Hajime Moriyasu

The final squad was announced on 26 December 2017.

No.	Pos.	Player	Date of birth (age)	Club
1	GK	Ryosuke Kojima	30 January 1997 (aged 20)	(Japan Football Association) Waseda University
2	DF	So Fujitani	28 October 1997 (aged 20)	(Japan Football Association) Vissel Kobe
3	MF	Itsuki Urata	29 January 1997 (aged 20)	(Japan Football Association) Giravanz Kitakyushu
4	DF	**Ko Itakura**	27 January 1997 (aged 20)	(Japan Football Association) Vegalta Sendai
5	DF	Takahiro Yanagi	5 August 1997 (aged 20)	(Japan Football Association) FC Tokyo
6	MF	Yoichi Naganuma	14 April 1997 (aged 20)	(Japan Football Association) Montedio Yamagata
7	DF	**Teruki Hara**	30 July 1998 (aged 19)	(Japan Football Association) Albirex Niigata
8	MF	**Tsukasa Morishima**	25 April 1997 (aged 20)	(Japan Football Association) Sanfrecce Hiroshima
9	FW	**Kyosuke Tagawa**	11 February 1999 (aged 18)	(Japan Football Association) Sagan Tosu
10	MF	**Koji Miyoshi**	26 March 1997 (aged 20)	(Japan Football Association) Kawasaki Frontale
11	MF	**Keita Endo**	22 November 1997 (aged 20)	(Japan Football Association) Yokohama F. Marinos
12	GK	Go Hatano	25 May 1998 (aged 19)	(Japan Football Association) FC Tokyo
13	MF	**Yuto Iwasaki**	11 June 1998 (aged 19)	(Japan Football Association) Kyoto Sanga
14	MF	Akito Takagi	4 August 1997 (aged 20)	(Japan Football Association) Gamba Osaka
15	DF	Honoya Shoji	8 October 1997 (aged 20)	(Japan Football Association) Zweigen Kanazawa
16	MF	Shion Inoue	3 August 1997 (aged 20)	(Japan Football Association) Tokyo Verdy
17	MF	Yuta Kamiya	24 April 1997 (aged 20)	(Japan Football Association) Ehime
18	FW	**Reo Hatate**	21 November 1997 (aged 20)	(Japan Football Association) Juntendo University
19	FW	Ren Komatsu	10 September 1998 (aged 19)	(Japan Football Association) Sanno Institute of Management
20	DF	**Taiyo Koga**	28 October 1998 (aged 19)	(Japan Football Association) Kashiwa Reysol
21	MF	**Hiroki Ito**	12 May 1999 (aged 18)	(Japan Football Association) Júbilo Iwata
22	DF	**Yugo Tatsuta**	21 June 1998 (aged 19)	(Japan Football Association) Shimizu S-Pulse
23	GK	Koto Abe	1 August 1997 (aged 20)	(Japan Football Association) University of Tsukuba

=== North Korea ===
Coach: Ju Song-Il

No.	Pos.	Player	Date of birth (age)	Club
1	GK	Kim Yu-il	30 January 1997 (aged 20)	(DPR Korea Football Association) Kigwancha
2	DF	An Song-il	5 August 1996 (aged 21)	(DPR Korea Football Association)
3	DF	Song Kum-song	23 August 1995 (aged 22)	(DPR Korea Football Association)
4	DF	**Kim Kum-chol**	7 April 1997 (aged 20)	(DPR Korea Football Association) Rimyongsu
5	MF	**Ri Un-chol**	13 July 1995 (aged 22)	(DPR Korea Football Association) Sonbong
6	FW	**Choe Song-hyok**	8 February 1998 (aged 19)	(Italian Football Federation) Perugia
7	MF	Jo Kwang-myong	3 January 1995 (aged 23)	(DPR Korea Football Association) April 25
8	FW	Kim Song-sun	31 December 1995 (aged 22)	(Japan Football Association) FC Ryukyu
9	FW	**Kim Yu-song**	24 January 1995 (aged 22)	(DPR Korea Football Association) April 25
10	MF	**Jo Sol-song**	27 October 1995 (aged 22)	(DPR Korea Football Association) Pyongyang City
11	MF	**Choe Ju-song**	27 January 1996 (aged 21)	(DPR Korea Football Association) Amrokkang
12	MF	**Kang Kuk-chol**	29 September 1999 (aged 18)	(DPR Korea Football Association) Rimyongsu
13	GK	Choe Hyok	10 February 1997 (aged 20)	(DPR Korea Football Association)
14	DF	O Chol-hyok	25 September 1995 (aged 22)	(DPR Korea Football Association) Hwaebul
15	DF	Kim Chung-il	21 August 1997 (aged 20)	(DPR Korea Football Association)
16	FW	Ri Hun	31 August 1997 (aged 20)	(DPR Korea Football Association)
17	FW	Han Yong-thae	30 October 1996 (aged 21)	(Japan Football Association) Korea University
18	GK	Kang Ju-hyok	31 May 1997 (aged 20)	(DPR Korea Football Association) Hwaebul
19	DF	Jong Tong-chol	21 April 1997 (aged 20)	(DPR Korea Football Association) Rimyongsu
20	MF	So Jong-hyok	1 July 1995 (aged 22)	(DPR Korea Football Association) April 25
21	DF	Kim Nam-il	1 January 1996 (aged 22)	(DPR Korea Football Association)
22	MF	**Kim Kuk-bom**	19 February 1995 (aged 22)	(DPR Korea Football Association) April 25

=== Thailand ===
Coach: (Bulgaria) Zoran Janković

The final squad was announced on 1 January 2018.

No.	Pos.	Player	Date of birth (age)	Club
1	GK	Apirak Worawong	7 January 1996 (aged 22)	(Football Association of Thailand) Chiangmai
2	DF	**Pawee Tanthatemee**	22 October 1996 (aged 21)	(Football Association of Thailand) Ratchaburi Mitr Phol
3	DF	Saharat Pongsuwan	11 July 1996 (aged 21)	(Football Association of Thailand) Bangkok Glass
4	DF	**Worawut Namvech**	4 July 1995 (aged 22)	(Football Association of Thailand) Chiangrai United
5	MF	Ratthanakorn Maikami	7 January 1998 (aged 20)	(Football Association of Thailand) Buriram United
6	DF	Wanchai Jarunongkran	18 December 1996 (aged 21)	(Football Association of Thailand) Air Force Central
7	FW	Nattawut Sombatyotha	1 May 1996 (aged 21)	(Football Association of Thailand) Ratchaburi Mitr Phol
8	MF	Nopphon Ponkam	19 July 1996 (aged 21)	(Football Association of Thailand) Police Tero
9	FW	**Chenrop Samphaodi**	2 June 1995 (aged 22)	(Football Association of Thailand) Muangthong United
10	MF	**Chaiyawat Buran**	26 October 1996 (aged 21)	(Football Association of Thailand) Chiangrai United
11	MF	Tanasith Siripala	9 August 1995 (aged 22)	(Football Association of Thailand) Suphanburi
12	DF	Nitipong Sanmahung	4 March 1996 (aged 21)	(Football Association of Thailand) Air Force Central
13	FW	**Picha Autra**	7 January 1996 (aged 22)	(Football Association of Thailand) Pattaya United
14	MF	**Anon Amornlerdsak**	6 November 1996 (aged 21)	(Football Association of Thailand) Buriram United
15	DF	Saringkan Promsupa	29 March 1997 (aged 20)	(Football Association of Thailand) Rayong
16	MF	Sirimongkhon Jitbanjong	8 August 1997 (aged 20)	(Football Association of Thailand) Suphanburi
17	MF	Jakkit Wachpirom	26 January 1997 (aged 20)	(Japan Football Association) FC Tokyo
18	GK	Anusith Termmee	19 January 1995 (aged 22)	(Football Association of Thailand) Chainat Hornbill
19	FW	Sittichok Kannoo	9 August 1996 (aged 21)	(Football Association of Thailand) Bangkok United
20	GK	Nont Muangngam	20 April 1997 (aged 20)	(Football Association of Thailand) Police Tero
21	MF	**Worachit Kanitsribampen**	24 August 1997 (aged 20)	(Football Association of Thailand) Chonburi
22	FW	**Supachok Sarachat**	22 May 1998 (aged 19)	(Football Association of Thailand) Buriram United
23	DF	**Santipharp Chan-ngom**	23 September 1996 (aged 21)	(Football Association of Thailand) Police Tero

=== Palestine ===
Coach: Ayman Sandouqa

The final squad was announced on 31 December 2017.

No.	Pos.	Player	Date of birth (age)	Club
1	GK	Ramzi Fakhouri	19 February 1996 (aged 21)	(Palestinian Football Association) Thaqafi Tulkarm
2	DF	**Michel Termanini**	8 May 1998 (aged 19)	(Swedish Football Association) AFC Eskilstuna
3	MF	**Mohammed Bassim**	3 July 1995 (aged 22)	(United States Soccer Federation) University of St. Francis
4	MF	Abdallah Rayyan	18 April 1995 (aged 22)	(United States Soccer Federation) Wiley College
5	FW	Ahmed Zraiq	1 April 1996 (aged 21)	(Palestinian Football Association) Markaz Balata
6	MF	Mohanad Fannoun	18 September 1995 (aged 22)	(Palestinian Football Association) Shabab Al-Khalil
7	FW	**Mahmoud Abu Warda**	31 May 1995 (aged 22)	(Palestinian Football Association) Markaz Balata
8	MF	Omar Sandouqa	22 June 1996 (aged 21)	(Palestinian Football Association) Silwan
9	MF	**Oday Dabbagh**	3 December 1998 (aged 19)	(Palestinian Football Association) Hilal Al-Quds
10	FW	**Mahmoud Yousef**	30 July 1997 (aged 20)	(Palestinian Football Association) Shabab Al-Khalil
11	FW	**Mohamed Darwish**	20 February 1997 (aged 20)	(German Football Association) Arminia Hannover
12	FW	Mohammad El-Kayed	14 March 1997 (aged 20)	(Swedish Football Association) Prespa Birlik
13	FW	**Shehab Qumbor**	10 August 1997 (aged 20)	(Palestinian Football Association) Jabal Al-Mukaber
14	DF	Yousef Al-Ashhab	10 February 1995 (aged 22)	(Palestinian Football Association) Shabab Al-Khalil
15	DF	Abdallah Idrees	9 April 1995 (aged 22)	(Palestinian Football Association) Hilal Al-Quds
16	GK	Ahmed Abuhamam	13 April 1997 (aged 20)	(Israel Football Association) Ahi Acre
17	DF	**Mousa Farawi**	22 March 1998 (aged 19)	(Palestinian Football Association) Hilal Al-Quds
18	FW	Mohammed Obaid	30 September 1998 (aged 19)	(Palestinian Football Association) Hilal Al-Quds
19	MF	Mohammed Al-Assa	18 April 1997 (aged 20)	(Palestinian Football Association) Shabab Al-Abadiya
20	MF	Rami Salem	7 January 1996 (aged 22)	(Palestinian Football Association) Markaz Tulkarem
21	FW	**Ahmed Qatmish**	10 March 1998 (aged 19)	(Palestinian Football Association) Thaqafi Tulkarm
22	GK	**Naim Abuaker**	20 January 1995 (aged 22)	(Palestinian Football Association) Ahli Al-Khaleel
23	DF	Saadou Abdel Salam	23 November 1997 (aged 20)	(Hellenic Football Federation) Platanias

== Group C ==
=== Iraq ===
Coach: Abdul-Ghani Shahad

The final squad was announced on 3 January 2018.

No.	Pos.	Player	Date of birth (age)	Club
1	GK	Ahmed Basil	19 August 1996 (aged 21)	(Iraq Football Association) Al-Shorta
2	DF	**Ahmed Abdul-Ridha**	2 April 1997 (aged 20)	(Iraq Football Association) Al-Quwa Al-Jawiya
3	DF	**Hamza Adnan**	8 February 1996 (aged 21)	(Iraq Football Association) Al-Minaa
4	DF	Burhan Jumaah	1 July 1996 (aged 21)	(Iraq Football Association) Al-Najaf
5	DF	**Ali Lateef**	18 January 1996 (aged 21)	(Iraq Football Association) Al-Shorta
6	MF	Ali Raheem	17 February 1995 (aged 22)	(Iraq Football Association) Al-Zawraa
7	MF	**Hussein Ali**	29 November 1996 (aged 21)	(Iraq Football Association) Al-Zawraa
8	MF	Mohammed Jaffal	1 June 1996 (aged 21)	(Iraq Football Association) Al-Minaa
9	FW	**Farhan Shakor**	15 October 1995 (aged 22)	(Iraq Football Association) Al-Najaf
10	FW	**Ayman Hussein**	22 March 1996 (aged 21)	(Iraq Football Association) Al-Shorta
11	FW	**Alaa Abbas**	27 July 1997 (aged 20)	(Iraq Football Association) Naft Al-Wasat
12	GK	Ali Abdul-Hassan	18 September 1996 (aged 21)	(Iraq Football Association) Al-Talaba
13	MF	**Bashar Resan**	22 December 1996 (aged 21)	(Football Federation Islamic Republic of Iran) Persepolis
14	DF	Khudhor Ali	19 June 1998 (aged 19)	(Iraq Football Association) Al-Najaf
15	MF	**Ibrahim Bayesh**	1 May 2000 (aged 17)	(Iraq Football Association) Al-Zawraa
16	MF	**Safaa Hadi**	14 October 1998 (aged 19)	(Iraq Football Association) Al-Zawraa
17	DF	**Alaa Mhawi**	3 June 1996 (aged 21)	(Iraq Football Association) Al-Shorta
18	DF	**Ruslan Hanoon**	4 March 1996 (aged 21)	(Iraq Football Association) Naft Maysan
19	MF	**Amjad Attwan**	12 March 1997 (aged 20)	(Iraq Football Association) Al-Najaf
20	FW	Walid Kareem	10 June 1997 (aged 20)	(Iraq Football Association) Al-Naft
21	MF	Ahmed Mohsen	24 January 1995 (aged 22)	(Iraq Football Association) Al-Naft
22	GK	Haider Mohammed	23 October 1996 (aged 21)	(Iraq Football Association) Naft Al-Wasat
23	DF	Ali Kadhim Mohammed	26 September 1997 (aged 20)	(Iraq Football Association) Al-Najaf

=== Jordan ===
Coach: (England) Iain Brunskill

The final squad was announced on 27 December 2017.

No.	Pos.	Player	Date of birth (age)	Club
1	GK	Rafat Al-Rabie	31 July 1997 (aged 20)	(Jordan Football Association) Al-Ramtha
2	DF	Jabeer Khattab	26 June 1995 (aged 22)	(Jordan Football Association) Al-Jazeera
3	DF	Mustafa Kamal	12 February 1995 (aged 22)	(Jordan Football Association) Shabab Al-Ordon
4	DF	Khaled Al-Awaqlah	2 June 1995 (aged 22)	(Jordan Football Association) Al-Ramtha
5	DF	**Yazan Abu Arab**	31 January 1996 (aged 21)	(Jordan Football Association) Al-Jazeera
6	MF	Ibrahim Al-Khub	12 February 1996 (aged 21)	(Jordan Football Association) Al-Ramtha
7	FW	**Ahmed Al-Riyahi**	13 January 1995 (aged 22)	(Kuwait Football Association) Qadsia
8	MF	**Noor Al-Rawabdeh**	24 February 1997 (aged 20)	(Jordan Football Association) Al-Jazeera
9	FW	**Baha' Faisal**	30 May 1995 (aged 22)	(Jordan Football Association) Al-Wehdat
10	FW	**Musa Al-Taamari**	10 June 1997 (aged 20)	(Jordan Football Association) Shabab Al-Ordon
11	FW	**Ahmed Al-Maharmeh**	18 June 1997 (aged 20)	(Jordan Football Association) Al-Jazeera
12	GK	Obeida Al-Zoubi	16 January 1995 (aged 22)	(Jordan Football Association) Al-Faisaly
13	MF	Yousef Abu Jalboush	15 June 1998 (aged 19)	(Jordan Football Association) Al-Faisaly
14	MF	Mahmoud Shawkat	20 May 1995 (aged 22)	(Jordan Football Association) Al-Ahli
15	DF	Saed Al-Rosan	1 February 1997 (aged 20)	(Jordan Football Association) Mansheyat Bani Hasan
16	MF	Mohammad Al-Razem	12 June 1995 (aged 22)	(Jordan Football Association) Shabab Al-Ordon
17	FW	**Khaled Al-Dardour**	23 May 1996 (aged 21)	(Jordan Football Association) Al-Ramtha
18	MF	Suleiman Abu Zama'a	25 December 1995 (aged 22)	(Jordan Football Association) Shabab Al-Ordon
19	MF	Anas Al-Awadat	29 May 1998 (aged 19)	(Jordan Football Association) Al-Wehdat
20	MF	**Hassan Al-Zahrawi**	23 April 1995 (aged 22)	(Jordan Football Association) Al-Ramtha
21	DF	**Ward Al-Barri**	29 June 1997 (aged 20)	(Jordan Football Association) Shabab Al-Ordon
22	GK	Mahmoud Al-Kawamleh	24 December 1997 (aged 20)	(Jordan Football Association) Al-Jalil
23	MF	**Ahmed Al-Ersan**	28 September 1995 (aged 22)	(Jordan Football Association) Mansheyat Bani Hasan

=== Saudi Arabia ===
Coach: (Argentina) Daniel Teglia

The final squad was announced on 30 December 2017.

No.	Pos.	Player	Date of birth (age)	Club
1	GK	**Amin Bukhari**	2 May 1997 (aged 20)	(Saudi Arabian Football Federation) Al-Ittihad
2	DF	**Abdullah Hassoun**	19 March 1997 (aged 20)	(Saudi Arabian Football Federation) Al-Ahli
3	DF	Awn Al-Saluli	2 September 1998 (aged 19)	(Saudi Arabian Football Federation) Al-Ittihad
4	DF	Abdullah Al-Khateeb	12 March 1995 (aged 22)	(Saudi Arabian Football Federation) Al-Khaleej
5	DF	**Abdulelah Al-Amri**	15 January 1997 (aged 20)	(Saudi Arabian Football Federation) Al-Nassr
6	MF	**Sami Al-Najei**	7 February 1997 (aged 20)	(Saudi Arabian Football Federation) Al-Nassr
7	MF	Rakan Al-Shamlan	14 July 1998 (aged 19)	(Saudi Arabian Football Federation) Al-Nassr
8	MF	**Osama Al-Khalaf**	26 December 1996 (aged 21)	(Saudi Arabian Football Federation) Al-Ettifaq
9	FW	Mojahed Al-Munee	15 January 1996 (aged 21)	(Saudi Arabian Football Federation) Al-Hilal
10	MF	Fahad Al-Jumeiah	10 May 1995 (aged 22)	(Saudi Arabian Football Federation) Al-Nassr
11	MF	**Abdullah Al-Jouei**	2 March 1995 (aged 22)	(Saudi Arabian Football Federation) Al-Batin
12	DF	Mohammed Al-Baqawi	12 July 1995 (aged 22)	(Saudi Arabian Football Federation) Al-Fayha
13	DF	**Hamdan Al-Shamrani**	14 December 1996 (aged 21)	(Saudi Arabian Football Federation) Al-Ahli
14	MF	**Ali Al-Asmari**	12 January 1997 (aged 20)	(Saudi Arabian Football Federation) Al-Ahli
15	DF	Qassem Lajami	24 April 1996 (aged 21)	(Saudi Arabian Football Federation) Al-Khaleej
16	MF	Sultan Al-Farhan	25 September 1996 (aged 21)	(Saudi Arabian Football Federation) Al-Raed
17	MF	**Abdullah Al-Khaibari**	16 August 1996 (aged 21)	(Saudi Arabian Football Federation) Al-Shabab
18	FW	Jaber Asiri	24 September 1997 (aged 20)	(Saudi Arabian Football Federation) Al-Wehda
19	MF	Fahad Al-Rashidi	16 May 1997 (aged 20)	(Saudi Arabian Football Federation) Al-Hilal
20	FW	Abdulaziz Al-Aryani	13 March 1996 (aged 21)	(Saudi Arabian Football Federation) Al-Ittihad
21	GK	**Mohammed Al Rubaie**	14 August 1997 (aged 20)	(Saudi Arabian Football Federation) Al-Ahli
22	GK	Saleh Al Ohaymid	21 May 1998 (aged 19)	(Saudi Arabian Football Federation) Al-Nassr
23	DF	**Ali Lajami**	24 April 1996 (aged 21)	(Saudi Arabian Football Federation) Al-Khaleej

=== Malaysia ===
Coach: Ong Kim Swee

The final squad was announced on 29 December 2017.

No.	Pos.	Player	Date of birth (age)	Club
1	GK	**Haziq Nadzli**	6 January 1998 (aged 20)	(Football Association of Malaysia) Johor Darul Ta'zim
2	DF	**Matthew Davies**	7 February 1995 (aged 22)	(Football Association of Malaysia) Pahang
3	DF	Syazwan Zaipol	24 February 1995 (aged 22)	(Football Association of Malaysia) Perak TBG
4	DF	Adib Zainudin	15 February 1995 (aged 22)	(Football Association of Malaysia) Felcra
5	DF	**Syahmi Safari**	5 February 1998 (aged 19)	(Football Association of Malaysia) Selangor
6	FW	**Safawi Rasid**	5 March 1997 (aged 20)	(Football Association of Malaysia) Johor Darul Ta'zim
7	MF	**Akif Syahiran**	11 May 1999 (aged 18)	(Football Association of Malaysia) Kelantan
8	MF	**Nor Azam Azih**	3 January 1995 (aged 23)	(Football Association of Malaysia) Pahang
9	DF	**Adam Nor Azlin**	5 January 1996 (aged 22)	(Football Association of Malaysia) Johor Darul Ta'zim
10	FW	Hadi Fayyadh	22 January 2000 (aged 17)	(Football Association of Malaysia) Johor Darul Ta'zim II
11	FW	Jafri Firdaus Chew	11 June 1997 (aged 20)	(Football Association of Malaysia) PKNS
12	FW	Thanabalan Nadarajah	25 February 1995 (aged 22)	(Football Association of Malaysia) Negeri Sembilan
13	MF	Tommy Mawat Bada	26 June 1995 (aged 22)	(Football Association of Malaysia) PJ Rangers
14	MF	**Syamer Kutty Abba**	1 October 1997 (aged 20)	(Football Association of Malaysia) Johor Darul Ta'zim
15	DF	**Dominic Tan**	12 March 1997 (aged 20)	(Football Association of Malaysia) Johor Darul Ta'zim
16	MF	**Danial Amier Norhisham**	27 March 1997 (aged 20)	(Football Association of Malaysia) FELDA United
17	DF	**Irfan Zakaria**	4 June 1995 (aged 22)	(Football Association of Malaysia) Kuala Lumpur
18	MF	**Akhyar Rashid**	1 May 1999 (aged 18)	(Football Association of Malaysia) Kedah
19	FW	**Kogileswaran Raj**	21 September 1998 (aged 19)	(Football Association of Malaysia) Pahang
20	DF	Shivan Pillay	7 December 2000 (aged 17)	(Football Association of Malaysia) PKNS
21	MF	**Syazwan Andik**	4 August 1996 (aged 21)	(Football Association of Malaysia) Johor Darul Ta'zim II
22	GK	**Ifwat Akmal**	10 August 1996 (aged 21)	(Football Association of Malaysia) Kedah
23	GK	**Syihan Hazmi**	22 February 1996 (aged 21)	(Football Association of Malaysia) Negeri Sembilan

== Group D ==
=== South Korea ===
Coach: Kim Bong-gil

The final squad was announced on 5 January 2018.

No.	Pos.	Player	Date of birth (age)	Club
1	GK	Kang Hyeon-mu	13 March 1995 (aged 22)	(Korea Football Association) Pohang Steelers
2	DF	Park Jae-woo	11 October 1995 (aged 22)	(Korea Football Association) Daejeon Citizen
3	DF	Lee Geon	8 January 1996 (aged 22)	(Korea Football Association) Ansan Greeners
4	DF	Go Myeong-seok	27 September 1995 (aged 22)	(Korea Football Association) Bucheon 1995
5	DF	Hwang Hyun-soo	22 July 1995 (aged 22)	(Korea Football Association) FC Seoul
6	MF	Hwang Ki-wook	10 June 1996 (aged 21)	(Royal Belgian Football Association) AFC Tubize
7	MF	**Kim Moon-hwan**	1 August 1995 (aged 22)	(Korea Football Association) Busan IPark
8	MF	Han Seung-gyu	28 September 1996 (aged 21)	(Korea Football Association) Ulsan Hyundai
9	FW	Lee Keun-ho	21 May 1996 (aged 21)	(Korea Football Association) Yonsei University
10	MF	Yoon Seung-won	11 February 1995 (aged 22)	(Korea Football Association) FC Seoul
11	MF	**Cho Young-wook**	5 February 1999 (aged 18)	(Korea Football Association) Korea University
12	MF	**Cho Yu-min**	17 November 1996 (aged 21)	(Korea Football Association) Suwon FC
13	DF	Yoo Young-jae	16 December 1996 (aged 21)	(Korea Football Association) Ulsan Hyundai
14	FW	**Kim Gun-hee**	22 February 1995 (aged 22)	(Korea Football Association) Suwon Bluewings
15	MF	Choe Jae-hoon	20 November 1995 (aged 22)	(Korea Football Association) FC Anyang
16	MF	**Jang Yun-ho**	25 August 1996 (aged 21)	(Korea Football Association) Jeonbuk Hyundai
17	MF	Cho Jae-wan	29 August 1995 (aged 22)	(Korea Football Association) Seoul E-Land
18	FW	Park In-hyeok	29 December 1995 (aged 22)	(Football Association of Serbia) Vojvodina
19	DF	Kuk Tae-jeong	13 September 1995 (aged 22)	(Korea Football Association) Jeonbuk Hyundai
20	DF	Jo Sung-wook	22 March 1995 (aged 22)	(Korea Football Association) Seongnam FC
21	GK	Lee Tae-hee	26 April 1995 (aged 22)	(Korea Football Association) Incheon United
22	DF	**Lee Sang-min**	1 January 1998 (aged 20)	(Korea Football Association) Soongsil University
23	GK	**Song Beom-keun**	15 October 1997 (aged 20)	(Korea Football Association) Jeonbuk Hyundai

=== Australia ===
Coach: Ante Milicic

The final squad was announced on 19 December 2017.

No.	Pos.	Player	Date of birth (age)	Club
1	GK	Paul Izzo	6 January 1995 (aged 23)	(Football Australia) Adelaide United
2	DF	Nick Cowburn	7 March 1995 (aged 22)	(Football Australia) Newcastle Jets
3	DF	**Alex Gersbach**	8 May 1997 (aged 20)	(Norwegian Football Federation) Rosenborg
4	DF	Jonathan Aspropotamitis	7 June 1996 (aged 21)	(Football Australia) Western Sydney Wanderers
5	DF	**Aleksandar Susnjar**	19 August 1995 (aged 22)	(Football Association of the Czech Republic) Mladá Boleslav
6	MF	Aiden O'Neill	4 July 1998 (aged 19)	(The Football Association) Fleetwood Town
7	FW	Trent Buhagiar	27 February 1998 (aged 19)	(Football Australia) Central Coast Mariners
8	MF	Stefan Mauk	12 October 1995 (aged 22)	(Football Australia) Melbourne City
9	FW	George Blackwood	4 June 1997 (aged 20)	(Football Australia) Adelaide United
10	MF	**Ajdin Hrustic**	5 July 1996 (aged 21)	(Royal Dutch Football Association) Groningen
11	FW	Bruce Kamau	28 March 1995 (aged 22)	(Football Australia) Melbourne City
12	GK	Tom Glover	24 December 1997 (aged 20)	(Football Australia) Central Coast Mariners
13	FW	Milislav Popovic	6 March 1997 (aged 20)	(German Football Association) Eintracht Braunschweig II
14	MF	**Riley McGree**	2 November 1998 (aged 19)	(Royal Belgian Football Association) Club Brugge
15	DF	**Keanu Baccus**	7 June 1998 (aged 19)	(Football Australia) Western Sydney Wanderers
16	FW	**Joe Champness**	27 April 1997 (aged 20)	(Football Australia) Newcastle Jets
17	MF	Brandon Wilson	28 January 1997 (aged 20)	(Football Australia) Perth Glory
18	GK	Danijel Nizic	15 March 1995 (aged 22)	(The Football Association) Morecambe
19	FW	Deni Juric	3 September 1997 (aged 20)	(Croatian Football Federation) Hajduk Split
20	DF	**Thomas Deng**	27 March 1997 (aged 20)	(Football Australia) Melbourne Victory
21	DF	**Ruon Tongyik**	28 December 1996 (aged 21)	(Football Australia) Melbourne City
22	MF	Daniel De Silva	6 March 1997 (aged 20)	(Football Australia) Central Coast Mariners
23	DF	Ben Garuccio	15 June 1995 (aged 22)	(Football Australia) Adelaide United

=== Syria ===
Coach: Mohand Al Faqir

The final squad was announced on 1 January 2018.

No.	Pos.	Player	Date of birth (age)	Club
1	GK	**Khaled Ibrahim**	10 January 1996 (aged 21)	(Syrian Football Association) Al-Wahda
2	DF	Ahmad Al Ali	8 August 1997 (aged 20)	(Kuwait Football Association) Al-Nasr
3	DF	**Yousef Al Hamwi**	1 February 1997 (aged 20)	(Syrian Football Association) Al-Jaish
4	DF	**Jihad Busmar**	10 January 1996 (aged 21)	(Syrian Football Association) Al-Karamah
5	DF	**Fares Arnaout**	31 January 1997 (aged 20)	(Syrian Football Association) Al-Jaish
6	MF	**Ahmed Ashkar**	1 January 1996 (aged 22)	(Syrian Football Association) Al-Jaish
7	FW	**Momen Naji**	9 October 1996 (aged 21)	(Syrian Football Association) Al-Jaish
8	MF	**Mouhamad Anez**	14 May 1995 (aged 22)	(Syrian Football Association) Al-Jaish
9	FW	**Shadi Al Hamwi**	1 January 1995 (aged 23)	(Jordan Football Association) Al-Jazeera
10	FW	**Rafat Muhtadi**	24 December 1995 (aged 22)	(Syrian Football Association) Al-Ittihad
11	MF	**Mohammad Marmour**	4 January 1995 (aged 23)	(Lebanese Football Association) Al-Safa'
12	MF	Hamzah Muhanaeh	8 July 1998 (aged 19)	(United Arab Emirates Football Association) Al Ain
13	DF	Tarek Hindawi	31 January 1996 (aged 21)	(Syrian Football Association) Al-Ittihad
14	MF	Abdullah Jinat	18 January 1996 (aged 21)	(Syrian Football Association) Al-Karamah
15	DF	**Khaled Kurdaghli**	31 January 1997 (aged 20)	(Syrian Football Association) Tishreen
16	MF	Zeid Ghrir	10 January 1998 (aged 19)	(Syrian Football Association) Al-Karamah
17	MF	Zakria Hannan	21 August 1997 (aged 20)	(Syrian Football Association) Al-Ittihad
18	FW	Abd Al-Rahman Barakat	1 January 1998 (aged 20)	(Syrian Football Association) Al-Jaish
19	MF	Abdulhadi Shalha	19 January 1999 (aged 18)	(Syrian Football Association) Al-Wahda
20	MF	**Ahmed Al Ahmed**	18 October 1996 (aged 21)	(Syrian Football Association) Al-Ittihad
21	DF	Ahmad Al Ghalab	2 January 1996 (aged 22)	(Syrian Football Association) Al-Muhafaza
22	GK	Ahmad Kanaan	6 May 1995 (aged 22)	(Syrian Football Association) Al-Muhafaza
23	GK	Talal Al Hussen	11 November 1995 (aged 22)	(Syrian Football Association) Al-Wahda

=== Vietnam ===
Coach: (South Korea) Park Hang-seo

The final squad was announced on 30 December 2017.

No.	Pos.	Player	Date of birth (age)	Club
1	GK	**Bùi Tiến Dũng**	28 February 1997 (aged 20)	(Vietnam Football Federation) FLC Thanh Hóa
2	DF	**Phạm Xuân Mạnh**	9 February 1996 (aged 21)	(Vietnam Football Federation) Sông Lam Nghệ An
3	MF	Nguyễn Trọng Đại	7 April 1997 (aged 20)	(Vietnam Football Federation) Viettel
4	DF	**Bùi Tiến Dũng**	2 October 1995 (aged 22)	(Vietnam Football Federation) Viettel
5	DF	**Đoàn Văn Hậu**	19 April 1999 (aged 18)	(Vietnam Football Federation) Hà Nội
6	MF	**Lương Xuân Trường** (captain)	28 April 1995 (aged 22)	(Korea Football Association) Gangwon
7	MF	**Nguyễn Phong Hồng Duy**	13 June 1996 (aged 21)	(Vietnam Football Federation) Hoàng Anh Gia Lai
8	MF	**Phạm Đức Huy**	20 January 1995 (aged 22)	(Vietnam Football Federation) Hà Nội
9	MF	**Nguyễn Văn Toàn**	12 April 1996 (aged 21)	(Vietnam Football Federation) Hoàng Anh Gia Lai
10	FW	**Nguyễn Công Phượng**	21 January 1995 (aged 22)	(Vietnam Football Federation) Hoàng Anh Gia Lai
11	MF	**Đỗ Duy Mạnh**	29 September 1996 (aged 21)	(Vietnam Football Federation) Hà Nội
12	MF	**Châu Ngọc Quang**	1 February 1996 (aged 21)	(Vietnam Football Federation) Hoàng Anh Gia Lai
13	FW	**Hà Đức Chinh**	22 September 1997 (aged 20)	(Vietnam Football Federation) SHB Đà Nẵng
14	MF	**Phan Văn Đức**	11 April 1996 (aged 21)	(Vietnam Football Federation) Sông Lam Nghệ An
15	DF	Lê Văn Đại	2 August 1996 (aged 21)	(Vietnam Football Federation) FLC Thanh Hóa
16	DF	**Nguyễn Thành Chung**	8 September 1997 (aged 20)	(Vietnam Football Federation) Hà Nội
17	DF	**Vũ Văn Thanh**	14 April 1996 (aged 21)	(Vietnam Football Federation) Hoàng Anh Gia Lai
18	MF	**Trương Văn Thái Quý**	22 August 1997 (aged 20)	(Vietnam Football Federation) Hà Nội
19	MF	**Nguyễn Quang Hải**	12 April 1997 (aged 20)	(Vietnam Football Federation) Hà Nội
20	MF	Bùi Tiến Dụng	23 November 1998 (aged 19)	(Vietnam Football Federation) SHB Đà Nẵng
21	DF	**Trần Đình Trọng**	25 April 1997 (aged 20)	(Vietnam Football Federation) Sài Gòn
22	GK	Đặng Ngọc Tuấn	6 May 1995 (aged 22)	(Vietnam Football Federation) SHB Đà Nẵng
23	GK	**Nguyễn Văn Hoàng**	17 February 1995 (aged 22)	(Vietnam Football Federation) Sài Gòn
