= Lucho Barrios =

Luis Barrios Rojas (22 April 1935 – 5 May 2010), better known as Lucho Barrios, was a popular Peruvian Bolero singer, well known throughout Latin America, and especially popular in Chile. He was also referred to as Mr. Marabú.

His prominence was associated with singing boleros, which he brought to Chile in the 1960s.

== Biography ==
Luis Barrios Rojas was born in Callao, where he lived until the age of nine, when he moved to the Barrios Altos area of the Lima District. He had a long relationship with Zenobia Caceres Sanchez, with whom he had two children: Luis and Armando Barrios Caceres. He had a daughter with the Ecuadoran singer Mary Arauz named Angelica Maria Barrios Arauz, and one daughter with Elsa Espejo, the former general manager of Radio San Isidro, named Milagros Barrios Espejo.

In the 1950s, when he was still an amateur, Lucho Barrios was a finalist in a competition called "The Stairway of Triumph" that took place in the theaters in Lima. Later, he formed the trio "Los Incas", a group which lasted only a short while. He recorded a few small albums on the Smith label, but it was Edith Barr who helped his international success. She took him to Radio Callao where he met Julio Jaramillo, who was impressed by his voice, and invited him to sing in Ecuador. In 1957 he entered the National School of Opera, and studied until the age of 19 alongside Alejandro Vivanco, brother-in-law of Yma Sumac.

He then recorded his first albums, on which one of his first hits came out--the waltz Juanita. Then, achieving great fame in Ecuador, Lucho Barrios decided to return to Peru where he continued pumping out hits, which made him a star in all of the Americas. During this time he signed on Manuel Guerrero's label "MAG", and released songs including, "Marabu", "Me engañas mujer/You cheat on me women", "Mentirosa/Lying woman", "Te alejas/You drift away", "Copas de licor/Cups of liquor", "Mala/Evil Woman", "Adultera/Adulterous Woman", "Mirando y sonriendo/Looking and smiling", "Borrasca", "Nido de amor/Love nest", and many, many more including the all-time favorite--"Amor de pobre".

His albums reached all of America. On 18 September 1960 he performed at the fifth "El Rosedal" in Arica, Chile, with Puma Valdez' orchestra from Cuba. Over a thousand people came to every performance. In 1961, he returned to Chile and in Santiago, he recorded his first LP, making his fame in Chile grow even more, and expanding into Argentina, Mexico, and even the United States (i.e., a few families in the Bronx bought the album).

On 3 May 2010, Barrios was admitted into the emergency room at the National Hospital in Lima, due to a pulmonary embolism. He stayed in the intensive care unit in serious condition, until his death two days later on 5 May. His remains were displayed at the Museum of the Nation.
