= Miss Perú 1983 =

- Date: June 13, 1983
- Presenters: Humberto Martínez Morosini, Silvia Maccera
- Venue: Coliseo Amauta
- Broadcaster: Panamericana Televisión
- Entrants: 16
- Winner: Vivien Griffiths Shields; Distrito Capital

The Miss Perú 1983 pageant was held on June 13, 1983. That year, 16 candidates were competing for the national crown. The chosen winner represented Peru at the Miss Universe 1983 and Miss World 1983. The rest of the finalists would enter in different pageants.

== Placements ==
Final Results	Contestant
Miss Peru Universe 1983	Distrito Capital - Vivien Griffiths Shields
Miss World Peru 1983	Region Lima - Lizbet Alcázar
Miss Maja Peru 1983	Tumbes - Silvia Higueras
1st Runner-Up	Cajamarca - Carolina Anduaga
2nd Runner-Up	Tacna - Diana Puente
Top 10	Ucayali - Jessica Roisenwit; Moquegua - Verónica Rodríguez; Amazonas - Viviana Alvarado; Loreto - Sheyla Morey; La Libertad - Monique Gabuteau

== Special awards ==
- Best Regional Costume - Cuzco - Verónica Nizzola
- Miss Photogenic - Tacna - Diana Puente
- Miss Elegance - La Libertad - Monique Gabuteau
- Miss Body - Loreto - Sheyla Morey
- Best Hair - Distrito Capital - Vivien Griffiths
- Miss Congeniality - Tumbes - Catherine Maldonado
- Most Beautiful Face - Tacna - Diana Puente

.

== Delegates ==
- Amazonas - Viviana Alvarado
- Arequipa - Giuliana Estremadoyro
- Cajamarca - Carolina Anduaga
- Cuzco - Verónica Nizzola
- Distrito Capital - Vivien Griffiths Shields
- Huánuco - Úrsula Cuculiza
- Ica - Patricia Ramírez
- La Libertad - Monique Gabuteau
- Loreto - Sheyla Morey
- Moquegua - Verónica Rodríguez
- Pasco - Karina Melgar
- Region Lima - Lizbet Alcázar
- San Martín - Brunella Taddei
- Tacna - Diana Puente
- Tumbes - Catherine Maldonado
- Ucayali - Jessica Roisenwit

== Judges ==
- Rubén Toribio Díaz - Peruvian football soccer player
- Edith Barr - Peruvian Folk Singer
- Ofelia Lazo - Peruvian Actress
- Inés de Ronalds - Manager of Las Dunas Hotel
- Eduardo Bonilla - Manager of Creaciones Sheila
- Baruch Ivcher - Manager of Paraíso
- Fernando Gomberoff - Manager of Beauty Form
- Mario Cavagnaro - Creative Director of Panamericana Televisión

.
