= Filomeno =

Filomeno is both a given name and a surname of Italian, Portuguese and Spanish origin. Notable people with the name include:

== People with the given name ==
- Filomeno Codiñera (1939–2016), Filipino baseball player
- Filomeno da Paixão de Jesus (born 1953), East Timorese politician
- Filomeno do Nascimento Vieira Dias (born 1958), Angolan prelate of the Catholic Church
- Filomeno Maria Garcia Ozorio (1892–1937), Hong Kong–Portuguese doctor
- Filomeno Orbeta Caseñas (1888–1944), Filipino politician
- Filomeno Ormeño Belmonte (1899–1975), Peruvian composer
- Filomeno Biagio Tatò (1939–2025), Italian politician
- Filomeno Urdiroz (1904–1937), Spanish footballer

== People with the middle name ==
- Benigno Filomeno de Rojas (1821—1865), Dominican politician and lawyer
- Carlos Filomeno Agostinho das Neves (born 1953), Santomean politician
- José Filomeno dos Santos (born 1978), Angolan businessman

== People with the surname ==
- Lucio Filomeno (born 1980), Argentine footballer
- Marco Filomeno (born 1965), Italian footballer

== See also ==
- Filomena, feminine equivalent
- Filomeno Mata, a municipality in Veracruz, Mexico
- Filomeno Mata Totonac, a language spoken in Filomeno Mata, Mexico
