= Đặng Ngọc Tuấn =

Vietnamese footballer (born 1995)

Personal information
- Full name: Đặng Ngọc Tuấn
- Date of birth: 6 May 1995 (age 31)
- Place of birth: Long Xuyên, An Giang, Vietnam
- Height: 1.81 m (5 ft 11 in)
- Position: Goalkeeper

Youth career
- 2007–2013: Hùng Vương An Giang

Senior career*
Years	Team	Apps	(Gls)
2014–2015	An Giang	5	(0)
2015–2018	SHB Đà Nẵng	40	(0)
2019–2021	An Giang	29	(0)
2022–2022	Cần Thơ	17	(0)
2022–2024	Hồ Chí Minh City	0	(0)

International career^{‡}
2017–2018	Vietnam U23	2	(0)
Medal record
Men's football
Representing Vietnam
AFC U-23 Championship
Runner-up	2018 China	Team
- * Club domestic league appearances and goals as of 13 December 2017 ‡ National team caps and goals as of 13 December 2017

Đặng Ngọc Tuấn (born 6 May 1995) is a Vietnamese former footballer who plays as a goalkeeper.

== M-150 Cup ==
Ngọc Tuấn was included in Vietnam U23 squad for the M-150 Cup at Thailand

== Honours ==
Vietnam U23

- AFC U-23 Championship Runners-up 2018
