= Edith Barr =

Peruvian singer (1936–2026)

Background information
- Born: Nora Edith Barr García; 1 June 1936; La Victoria District, Lima, Peru
- Died: c. 1 September 2026 (aged 90) Lima, Peru
- Occupation: Singer

Nora Edith Barr García (1 June 1936 – c. 1 September 2026) was a Peruvian singer who specialized in Peruvian Creole music. Popularly known as the Flor Morena de la Canción Criolla, her career spanned over fifty years.

Beginning her career as a teenager, she performed at the Waldorf Astoria hotel in New York when she was sixteen and made her first recording at age 17. Over the next few years, she performed at venues in both Latin America and the United States and hosted shows in various Peruvian television stations; her most well known show was La revista de Edith, on which she promoted Creole music.

Barr retired multiple times from the music industry, first in 1971 upon her marriage. She performed for Pope John Paul II on his 1985 visit to Peru and, in 1986, was made a tourism ambassador by the Ministry of Industry and Tourism. In 2000, she was awarded an Order of Merit for Distinguished Services (Orden al Mérito por Servicios Distinguidos) for her work in Peruvian music.

== Early life ==
Nora Edith Barr García was born in La Victoria District in Lima, Peru, on 1 June 1936, to parents Guillermo Barr (a referee from Ancash) and Juana García (of Chincha). She had three siblings. Her uncle, Gonzalo Barr, was a bolero singer. Though Barr reported feeling stage fright as a child, she began performing at a music center in her neighborhood and, at the age of 10, skipping class to accompany her grandmother to radio stations in Lima.

== Career ==
Barr began her career at age 13, when she was chosen to perform alongside pianist Filomeno Ormeño Belmonte on a Creole-focused show aired by the Radio Nacional del Perú. Around that time, she was nicknamed Flor Morena de la Canción Criolla (transl. Dark flower of Creole song) by journalist and screenwriter Juan Malborg Ratto; she was known by that name for much of her career. When Barr was 16, she performed at the Waldorf Astoria hotel in New York, the first Peruvian singer to perform at the establishment. At the age of 17, she recorded her first record: a rendition of Emilio Peláez Montero's Puñaladas.

Over the following years, Barr became associated with Peruvian Creole music. She performed for the inauguration of El Trece in the 1960s, as well as at the Fontainebleau Hotel in Florida, El Patio in Mexico, the Hotel Tequendama in Colombia, and the Hotel Tamanaco in Venezuela. Barr sang multiple times at the Ancón music festival, winning three different times in the Creole music categories and appeared on television. She worked for seven years as the performer for the Gran Hotel Bolívar in her native Lima and hosted multiple shows on Channel 4, Channel 5, and Channel 9. Her best known show was La revista de Edith, on which she promoted Creole music. She also took film roles, appearing in Santo vs. el estrangulador(1965) and its sequel Santo vs. el espectro del estrangulador (1966) as a singer, and in the Mexican-Peruvian film Operación Ñongos (1964).

Upon her marriage in 1971, Barr announced her first retirement from the music industry to focus on her family. After holding a retirement concert at the Teatro Segura, she spent the next years living outside the country with her husband, including in Argentina, Uruguay, and Venezuela. She divorced him in 1982 and returned to Peru and the music industry a few years afterwards. She remarried, opening La casa de Edith in the Miraflores District with her new husband in 1983. In 1985, she performed for Pope John Paul II at the Hipódromo de Monterrico during his visit to the country; Barr performed a rendition of Chabuca Granda's song Tun Tun. The next year, in 1986, the Peruvian Ministry of Industry and Tourism made her a tourism ambassador.

She temporarily retired again from the music industry in 1993, after her return and the recording of her first CD, Barr again retired. Barr also retired upon her 50th anniversary as a singer.

Throughout her career, Barr recorded around 32 LP records and 300 singles. She was awarded a Commander of the Order of Merit for Distinguished Services (Orden al Mérito por Servicios Distinguidos) by the Peruvian government in 2000 for her work in music.

== Personal life and death ==
Barr married Catalan executive Alberto Salvany in 1971; the couple had one daughter before divorcing in 1982. She then married the Sicilian businessman Salvattore Battaglia, before beginning a romantic relationship with Peruvian businessman Enrique Loza, which was ended by his death. She was the godmother to Cecilia Bracamonte's daughter.

In October 2014, Barr was hospitalized at the Edgardo Rebagliati Martins National Hospital ICU for blood pressure issues and subsequently diagnosed with congestive heart failure.

Barr was hospitalized for a pulmonary embolism in late August 2026. Her death at the age of 90 was announced by her daughter on 1 September. The Ministry of Culture announced that her wake would be held at the Gran Teatro Nacional in Lima.

== Filmography ==
- Operación Ñongos (1964)
- Santo vs. el estrangulador (1965)
- Santo vs. el espectro del estrangulador (1966)
