= Ahmed Al-Maharmeh =

Jordanian footballer

Personal information
- Date of birth: September 28, 1993 (age 33)
- Place of birth: Amman, Jordan
- Position: Forward

Team information
- Current team: Sahab
- Number: 70

Senior career*
Years	Team	Apps	(Gls)
2015–2017	Sahab		
2017–2020	Al-Jazeera		
2018–2019	→ Shabab Al-Ordon (loan)		
2020–	Sahab		

International career^{‡}
2016–2020	Jordan U-23		
2016–	Jordan	2	(0)
- * Club domestic league appearances and goals ‡ National team caps and goals as of July 2017

Ahmed Al-Maharmeh (Arabic: أحمد المحارمة; born Sep 28, 1993) is a Jordanian football player who currently plays as a forward for Sahab.

== International career ==
He played his first international match against Lebanon in an international friendly on 31 August 2016, which Jordan drew 1–1.

== International career statistics ==
As of 15 November 2016

Jordan national team
Year	Apps	Goals
2016	2	0
Total	2	0
