= Armindo =

Armindo is a given name. Notable people with the name include:

- Armindo Araújo (born 1977), Portuguese rally driver
- Nicolas Armindo (born 1982), French race car driver
- Armindo Tué Na Bangna (born 1994), known as Bruma, Portuguese professional footballer
- Amaury Armindo Bischoff (born 1987), professional footballer
- Armindo Cadilla (1906–1975), associate justice of the Puerto Rico Supreme Court
- Armindo Lopes Coelho (1931–2010), Roman Catholic bishop, Porto, Portugal
- Armindo Ferreira (born 1976), professional footballer
- Armindo Nobs Ferreira (died 1947), Brazilian association football coach
- Armindo Fonseca (born 1989), French former racing cyclist,
- Armindo Freitas-Magalhães (born 1966), Portuguese psychologist,
- Armindo Rodrigues Mendes Furtado, (born 1987), known as Brito, professional footballer
- Armindo Maia, East Timorese politician and academic
- Fernando Armindo Lugo Mendez (born 1951), laicized Catholic bishop, President of Paraguay (2008–2012)
- Armindo Monteiro (1896–1955), Portuguese university professor, businessman, diplomat and politician
- Armindo Antônio Ranzolin (1937–2022), Brazilian sports journalist and narrator
- Armindo Sieb (born 2003), German professional footballer
- Armindo Vaz d'Almeida (1953–2016), the seventh prime minister of São Tomé and Príncipe
