= Filomeno Ormeño Belmonte =

Filomeno Ormeño Belmonte (June 6, 1899 - November 5, 1975) was a Peruvian composer, orchestrator and pianist.

== Compositions ==
Among his most celebrated compositions are:

- "Red Lips"
- "When I Want"
- "Happy Dawn"
- "An Old Will"
- "Of Soul and Bead"
- "Peruvian Tondero"
- "The Huayruro"
- "The love Palomo"
