= Omar Al-Amadi =

Qatari footballer (born 1995)

Personal information
- Full name: Omar Ahmed Abdurahman Al-Amadi
- Date of birth: 5 April 1995 (age 31)
- Place of birth: Doha, Qatar
- Height: 1.70 m (5 ft 7 in)
- Position: Midfielder

Team information
- Current team: Al Shahaniya
- Number: 20

Senior career*
| Years | Team | Apps | (Gls) |
| 2015–2017 | Al Arabi | 36 | (1) |
| 2017–2025 | Qatar | 96 | (4) |
| 2025– | Al Shahaniya | 3 | (0) |
- * Club domestic league appearances and goals as of 10:01, 7 June 2026 (UTC)

Omar Al-Amadi (Arabic: عمر العمادي) (born 5 April 1995) is a Qatari professional footballer who plays for Al Shahaniya as a midfielder.
