= Salah Al-Yahri =

Qatari footballer (born 1995)

Personal information
- Full name: Salah Alawi Al-Yahri
- Date of birth: 25 August 1995 (age 31)
- Place of birth: Qatar
- Position: Midfielder

Team information
- Current team: Al-Kharaitiyat
- Number: 8

Youth career
- ASPIRE

Senior career*
Years	Team	Apps	(Gls)
2013–2015	Muaither	3	(0)
2014–2015	→ Al Gharafa (loan)	0	(0)
2015–2017	El Jaish	10	(0)
2017–2018	Al-Khor	3	(0)
2018–2019	Al-Rayyan	3	(0)
2019–2020	Al Ahli	7	(0)
2022	Al-Markhiya		
2022–2023	Al-Shamal	5	(0)
2023–	Al-Kharaitiyat	7	(0)

International career
- Qatar U23
- * Club domestic league appearances and goals

Salah Al-Yahri (Arabic: صلاح اليهري; born 25 August 1995) is a Qatari footballer plays for Al-Kharaitiyat as a midfielder.
