= 2024 AFC U-23 Asian Cup qualification =

Tournament details
- Host countries: Jordan (Group A); South Korea (Group B); Vietnam (Group C); Bahrain (Group D); Uzbekistan (Group E); Kuwait (Group F); China (Group G); Thailand (Group H); Tajikistan (Group I); Saudi Arabia (Group J); Indonesia (Group K)
- Dates: 6 September – 12 September 2023
- Teams: 43 (eligible) (from 1 confederation)
- Venues: 14 (in 11 host cities)

Tournament statistics
- Matches played: 57
- Goals scored: 215 (3.77 per match)
- Top scorer(s): (Uzbekistan) Khusayin Norchaev (6 goals)

The 2024 AFC U-23 Asian Cup qualification was an international men's under-23 football competition which decided the participating teams of the 2024 AFC U-23 Asian Cup.

A total of 16 teams qualified to play in the final tournament, including Qatar who qualified automatically as hosts.

== Format changes ==
The AFC Executive Committee had approved several strategic recommendations put forward by the AFC Competitions Committee, one of which was the removal of zone restrictions in AFC youth competitions.

== Draw ==
Forty-three of the 47 AFC member associations, including the final tournament hosts Qatar, submitted their interest to compete in the qualifiers. The draw took place on 25 May 2023 at 15:00 MST (UTC+8), at the AFC House in Kuala Lumpur, Malaysia.

The teams were seeded according to their performance in the 2022 AFC U-23 Asian Cup final tournament and qualification. The nations chosen as group hosts were announced on 17 May and were drawn into separate groups at the beginning of the draw. As Qatar already qualified for the final tournament as hosts and their fixtures will be considered as friendly matches, they were seeded as an unranked team for the draw and placed in Pot 4.

| | Pot 1 | Pot 2 | Pot 3 | Pot 4 |
|---|---|---|---|---|
| Host Pot | 1. **Saudi Arabia** (1) **(H)**; 2. **Uzbekistan** (2) **(H)**; 5. **South Korea** (5) **(H)**; 7. **Vietnam** (7) **(H)**; 9. **Thailand** (9) **(H)**; 10. **Jordan** (10) **(H)** | 13. **Kuwait** (14) **(H)**; 15. **Tajikistan** (16) **(H)**; 16. Bahrain (17) **(H)**; 22. **Indonesia** (23) **(H)** | | 38. **China** (NR) **(H)** |
| Remaining Teams | 3. **Japan** (3); 4. **Australia** (4); 6. **Iraq** (6); 8. Turkmenistan (8); 11. **United Arab Emirates** (11) | 12. Iran (12); 14. **Malaysia** (15); 17. Myanmar (18); 18. Cambodia (19); 19. Syria (20); 20. India (21); 21. Singapore (22) | 23. Kyrgyzstan (24); 24. Palestine (25); 25. Yemen (26); 26. Timor-Leste (27); 27. Chinese Taipei (28); 28. Lebanon (29); 29. Laos (30); 30. Bangladesh (31); 31. Hong Kong (32); 32. Maldives (33) **(W)**; 33. Oman (34) | 34. Mongolia (35); 35. Philippines (36); 36. Afghanistan (NR); 37. Brunei (NR); 39. North Korea (NR) **(W)**; 40. Guam (NR); 41. Macau (NR) **(N)**; 42. Pakistan (NR); 43. **Qatar** (13) **(Q)** |

Notes

- Teams in **bold** qualified for the final tournament.
- (H): Qualification group hosts determined before the draw
- (Q): Final tournament hosts, automatically qualified regardless of qualification results
- (W): Withdrew after draw

Did not enter
- Bhutan
- Nepal
- Northern Mariana Islands **(N)**
- Sri Lanka **(X)**

Notes

- (N): Not a member of the International Olympic Committee, ineligible for Olympics
- (X): Suspended

=== Draw result ===
The draw resulted in following groups.

Group A
| Pos | Team |
|---|---|
| A1 | **Jordan** |
| A2 | Syria |
| A3 | Oman |
| A4 | Brunei |

Group B
| Pos | Team |
|---|---|
| B1 | **South Korea** |
| B2 | Myanmar |
| B3 | Kyrgyzstan |
| B4 | **Qatar** |

Group C
| Pos | Team |
|---|---|
| C1 | **Vietnam** |
| C2 | Singapore |
| C3 | Yemen |
| C4 | Guam |

Group D
| Pos | Team |
|---|---|
| D1 | **Japan** |
| D2 | Bahrain |
| D3 | Palestine |
| D4 | Pakistan |

Group E
| Pos | Team |
|---|---|
| E1 | **Uzbekistan** |
| E2 | Iran |
| E3 | Hong Kong |
| E4 | Afghanistan |

Group F
| Pos | Team |
|---|---|
| F1 | **Iraq** |
| F2 | **Kuwait** |
| F3 | Timor-Leste |
| F4 | Macau |

Group G
| Pos | Team |
|---|---|
| G1 | **United Arab Emirates** |
| G2 | India |
| G3 | ~~Maldives~~ (Note: Withdrew from the tournament.) |
| G4 | **China** |

Group H
| Pos | Team |
|---|---|
| H1 | **Thailand** |
| H2 | **Malaysia** |
| H3 | Bangladesh |
| H4 | Philippines |

Group I
| Pos | Team |
|---|---|
| I1 | **Australia** |
| I2 | **Tajikistan** |
| I3 | Laos |
| I4 | ~~North Korea~~ |

Group J
| Pos | Team |
|---|---|
| J1 | **Saudi Arabia** |
| J2 | Cambodia |
| J3 | Lebanon |
| J4 | Mongolia |

Group K
| Pos | Team |
|---|---|
| K1 | Turkmenistan |
| K2 | **Indonesia** |
| K3 | Chinese Taipei |

Bold indicates that the team has qualified for the final tournament.

== Format ==
In each group, teams played each other once at a centralized venue. The eleven group winners and the four best runners-up qualified for the final tournament.

=== Tiebreakers ===
Teams were ranked according to points (3 points for a win, 1 point for a draw, 0 points for a loss), and if tied on points, the following tiebreaking criteria were applied, in the order given, to determine the rankings:

1. Points in head-to-head matches among tied teams;
2. Goal difference in head-to-head matches among tied teams;
3. Goals scored in head-to-head matches among tied teams;
4. If more than two teams were tied, and after applying all head-to-head criteria above, a subset of teams were still tied, all head-to-head criteria above were reapplied exclusively to this subset of teams;
5. Goal difference in all group matches;
6. Goals scored in all group matches;
7. Penalty shoot-out if only two teams were tied and they met in the last round of the group;
8. Lower disciplinary points (yellow card = 1 point, red card as a result of two yellow cards = 3 points, direct red card = 3 points, yellow card followed by direct red card = 4 points);
9. Drawing of lots.

== Groups ==
All matches were played between 6 September and 12 September 2023.

=== Group A ===
- All matches were held in Jordan.
- Times listed are UTC+3.

| Pos | Team | Pld | W | D | L | GF | GA | GD | Pts | Qualification |
|---|---|---|---|---|---|---|---|---|---|---|
| 1 | Jordan (H) | 3 | 3 | 0 | 0 | 12 | 0 | +12 | 9 | Final tournament |
| 2 | Oman | 3 | 2 | 0 | 1 | 5 | 1 | +4 | 6 | |
| 3 | Syria | 3 | 1 | 0 | 2 | 11 | 4 | +7 | 3 | |
| 4 | Brunei | 3 | 0 | 0 | 3 | 0 | 23 | −23 | 0 | |

Source: AFC
Rules for classification: Qualification tiebreakers
(H) Hosts
6 September 2023
17:30

| Syria | 0–2 | Oman |
|---|---|---|
| | Report | Al-Rawahi 25'; Al-Mashaikhi 67' |

Prince Mohammed Stadium, Zarqa
Attendance: 0
Referee: Mohanad Qasim Sarray (Iraq)
6 September 2023
21:00

| Jordan | 9–0 | Brunei |
|---|---|---|
| Bani Hani 10'; Darwish 16'; Al-Shanaineh 22', 80'; Abualnadi 48'; Zulkifle 84' (o.g.); Wafiq 90+2' (o.g.); Abu Taha 90+5'; Al-Riyalat 90+7' | Report |

Prince Mohammed Stadium, Zarqa
Attendance: 800
Referee: Crystal John (India)

9 September 2023
17:30

| Brunei | 0–11 | Syria |
|---|---|---|
| | Report | Osman 20'; Kass Kawo 41'; Abdullatif 45', 73', 78'; Rihanieh 45+3', 62', 66' (pen.); Hatem 75'; Nayef 90+4'; Ahmad 90+8' |

Prince Mohammed Stadium, Zarqa
Attendance: 300
Referee: Hiroki Kasahara (Japan)
9 September 2023
21:00

| Oman | 0–1 | Jordan |
|---|---|---|
| | Report | Al-Riyalat 87' |

Prince Mohammed Stadium, Zarqa
Attendance: 2,800
Referee: Vahid Kazemi (Iran)

12 September 2023
17:30

| Oman | 3–0 | Brunei |
|---|---|---|
| Al-Maashari 5'; Al-Abdulsalam 8'; Al-Araimi 10' | Report |

Prince Mohammed Stadium, Zarqa
Attendance: 50
Referee: Mohanad Qasim Sarray (Iraq)
12 September 2023
21:00

| Jordan | 2–0 | Syria |
|---|---|---|
| Al-Riyalat 11'; Bani Hani 71' | Report |

Prince Mohammed Stadium, Zarqa
Attendance: 5,300
Referee: Nasrullo Kabirov (Tajikistan)

=== Group B ===
- All matches were held in South Korea.
- Times listed are UTC+9.
- Qatar already qualified to the final tournament as host country, so their matches will not be taken into account when calculating the group ranking.

| Pos | Team | Pld | W | D | L | GF | GA | GD | Pts | Qualification |
|---|---|---|---|---|---|---|---|---|---|---|
| 1 | South Korea (H) | 2 | 2 | 0 | 0 | 4 | 0 | +4 | 6 | Final tournament |
| 2 | Kyrgyzstan | 2 | 0 | 1 | 1 | 1 | 2 | −1 | 1 | |
| 3 | Myanmar | 2 | 0 | 1 | 1 | 1 | 4 | −3 | 1 | |

Source: AFC
Rules for classification: Qualification tiebreakers
(H) Hosts
6 September 2023
16:00

| Myanmar | 1–1 | Kyrgyzstan |
|---|---|---|
| Kaung Htet Paing 23' | Report | Brauzman 52' |

Changwon Football Center, Changwon
Attendance: 78
Referee: Majed Al Shamrani (Saudi Arabia)

9 September 2023
20:00

| Kyrgyzstan | 0–1 | South Korea |
|---|---|---|
| | Report | Hong Yun-sang 3' |

Changwon Football Center, Changwon
Attendance: 7,021
Referee: Zhang Lei (China)

12 September 2023
20:00

| South Korea | 3–0 | Myanmar |
|---|---|---|
| Paik Sang-hoon 5'; Jeon Byung-kwan 85'; Oh Jae-hyeok 90+2' | Report |

Changwon Football Center, Changwon
Attendance: 3,838
Referee: Majed Al Shamrani (Saudi Arabia)

=== Group C ===
- All matches were held in Vietnam.
- Times listed are UTC+7.

| Pos | Team | Pld | W | D | L | GF | GA | GD | Pts | Qualification |
|---|---|---|---|---|---|---|---|---|---|---|
| 1 | Vietnam (H) | 3 | 2 | 1 | 0 | 9 | 2 | +7 | 7 | Final tournament |
| 2 | Yemen | 3 | 2 | 0 | 1 | 8 | 2 | +6 | 6 | |
| 3 | Singapore | 3 | 0 | 2 | 1 | 3 | 6 | −3 | 2 | |
| 4 | Guam | 3 | 0 | 1 | 2 | 2 | 12 | −10 | 1 | |

Source: AFC
Rules for classification: Qualification tiebreakers
(H) Hosts
6 September 2023
16:00

| Singapore | 0–3 | Yemen |
|---|---|---|
| | Report | Maher 32', 45+3'; Hanash 41' |

Việt Trì Stadium, Việt Trì
Attendance: 1,326
Referee: Jonathan Barreiro (Australia)
6 September 2023
19:00

| Vietnam | 6–0 | Guam |
|---|---|---|
| Lê Văn Đô 33'; Nguyễn Văn Tùng 54' (pen.); Hồ Văn Cường 68'; Nguyễn Thanh Nhàn 79'; Hoàng Văn Toản 83'; Bùi Vĩ Hào 90' (pen.) | Report |

Việt Trì Stadium, Việt Trì
Attendance: 7,289
Referee: Tam Ping Wun (Hong Kong)

9 September 2023
16:00

| Guam | 1–1 | Singapore |
|---|---|---|
| Meyar 88' | Report | Farhan 63' (pen.) |

Việt Trì Stadium, Việt Trì
Attendance: 1,238
Referee: Abdul Hakim Haidi (Brunei)
9 September 2023
19:00

| Yemen | 0–1 | Vietnam |
|---|---|---|
| | Report | Bùi Vĩ Hào 84' |

Việt Trì Stadium, Việt Trì
Attendance: 12,168
Referee: Chen Hsin Chuan (Chinese Taipei)

12 September 2023
16:00

| Yemen | 5–1 | Guam |
|---|---|---|
| Mahross 2'; Al-Qashmi 17'; Al-Sharafi 25'; Maher 69'; Al-Harbi 88' | Report | Thomas 23' |

Việt Trì Stadium, Việt Trì
Attendance: 826
Referee: Tam Ping Wun (Hong Kong)
12 September 2023
19:00

| Vietnam | 2–2 | Singapore |
|---|---|---|
| Nguyễn Đình Bắc 13' (pen.); Nguyễn Hữu Nam 78' | Report | Nguyễn Hữu Nam 58' (o.g.); Zikos Chua 85' |

Việt Trì Stadium, Việt Trì
Attendance: 11,268
Referee: Hussein Abo Yehia (Lebanon)

=== Group D ===
- All matches were held in Bahrain.
- Times listed are UTC+3.

| Pos | Team | Pld | W | D | L | GF | GA | GD | Pts | |
|---|---|---|---|---|---|---|---|---|---|---|
| 1 | Japan | 3 | 2 | 1 | 0 | 7 | 0 | +7 | 7 | Final tournament |
| 2 | Palestine | 3 | 2 | 0 | 1 | 3 | 2 | +1 | 6 | |
| 3 | Bahrain (H) | 3 | 1 | 1 | 1 | 3 | 2 | +1 | 4 | |
| 4 | Pakistan | 3 | 0 | 0 | 3 | 2 | 11 | −9 | 0 | |

Source: AFC
Rules for classification: Qualification tiebreakers
(H) Hosts
6 September 2023
18:30

| Bahrain | 0–1 | Palestine |
|---|---|---|
| | Report | Qunbar 90+1' |

Al Muharraq Stadium, Arad
Attendance: 317
Referee: Sadullo Gulmurodi (Tajikistan)
6 September 2023
21:30

| Japan | 6–0 | Pakistan |
|---|---|---|
| Nishio 11'; Mito 43', 64'; Hosoya 45+2', 51' (pen.); Fujita 59' (pen.) | Report |

Al Muharraq Stadium, Arad
Attendance: 101
Referee: Yudi Nurcahya (Indonesia)

9 September 2023
18:30

| Pakistan | 1–3 | Bahrain |
|---|---|---|
| Ghazi 70' | Report | Haider 25', 48'; Abdulkarim 49' |

Al Muharraq Stadium, Arad
Attendance: 180
Referee: Zaid Thamer Mohammed (Syria)
9 September 2023
21:30

| Palestine | 0–1 | Japan |
|---|---|---|
| | Report | Fujio 23' |

Al Muharraq Stadium, Arad
Attendance: 51
Referee: Ahmed Eisa Darwish (United Arab Emirates)

12 September 2023
18:30

| Japan | 0–0 | Bahrain |
|---|---|---|
| | Report |

Al Muharraq Stadium, Arad
Attendance: 271
Referee: Sadullo Gulmurodi (Tajikistan)
12 September 2023
21:30

| Palestine | 2–1 | Pakistan |
|---|---|---|
| Al-Nabris 90+10', 90+15' | Report | Hamid 51' |

Al Muharraq Stadium, Arad
Attendance: 45
Referee: Adam Fazeel (Maldives)

=== Group E ===
- All matches were held in Uzbekistan.
- Times listed are UTC+5.

| Pos | Team | Pld | W | D | L | GF | GA | GD | Pts | Qualification |
|---|---|---|---|---|---|---|---|---|---|---|
| 1 | Uzbekistan (H) | 3 | 3 | 0 | 0 | 19 | 1 | +18 | 9 | Final tournament |
| 2 | Iran | 3 | 2 | 0 | 1 | 7 | 1 | +6 | 6 | |
| 3 | Afghanistan | 3 | 0 | 1 | 2 | 1 | 12 | −11 | 1 | |
| 4 | Hong Kong | 3 | 0 | 1 | 2 | 0 | 13 | −13 | 1 | |

Source: AFC
Rules for classification: Qualification tiebreakers
(H) Hosts
6 September 2023
17:00

| Iran | 3–0 | Hong Kong |
|---|---|---|
| Hazbavi 2'; Ghorbani 44'; Sayyadmanesh 88' | Report |

Lokomotiv Stadium, Tashkent
Attendance: 47
Referee: Chae Sang-hyeop (South Korea)
6 September 2023
19:00

| Uzbekistan | 8–1 | Afghanistan |
|---|---|---|
| Jaloliddinov 12', 54'; Davronov 36'; Norchaev 47', 53', 87'; Odilov 87'; Khamraliev 90+1' | Report | Musawi 42' |

JAR Stadium, Tashkent
Attendance: 3,380
Referee: Fariq Hitaba (Indonesia)

9 September 2023
17:00

| Afghanistan | 0–4 | Iran |
|---|---|---|
| | Report | Ghorbani 29'; Goodarzi 37'; Sayyadmanesh 58'; J. Hosseinnezhad 74' |

Lokomotiv Stadium, Tashkent
Attendance: 110
Referee: Mohamad Issa (Lebanon)
9 September 2023
19:00

| Hong Kong | 0–10 | Uzbekistan |
|---|---|---|
| | Report | Norchaev 6', 59', 69'; Fayzullaev 25'; Odilov 28'; Rakhmonaliev 57' (pen.); Yip Cheuk Man 74' (o.g.); Khoshimov 83', 88', 90+3' |

JAR Stadium, Tashkent
Attendance: 5,331
Referee: Hanna Hattab (Syria)

12 September 2023
17:00

| Hong Kong | 0–0 | Afghanistan |
|---|---|---|
| | Report |

Lokomotiv Stadium, Tashkent
Attendance: 57
Referee: Khash-Erdene Bold (Mongolian)
12 September 2023
19:00

| Uzbekistan | 1–0 | Iran |
|---|---|---|
| Fayzullaev 47' | Report |

JAR Stadium, Tashkent
Attendance: 7,891
Referee: Hanna Hattab (Syria)

=== Group F ===
- All matches were held in Kuwait.
- Times listed are UTC+3.

| Pos | Team | Pld | W | D | L | GF | GA | GD | Pts | Qualification |
|---|---|---|---|---|---|---|---|---|---|---|
| 1 | Iraq | 3 | 2 | 1 | 0 | 21 | 2 | +19 | 7 | Final tournament |
| 2 | Kuwait (H) | 3 | 2 | 1 | 0 | 9 | 2 | +7 | 7 | Final tournament |
| 3 | Timor-Leste | 3 | 1 | 0 | 2 | 5 | 10 | −5 | 3 | |
| 4 | Macau | 3 | 0 | 0 | 3 | 0 | 21 | −21 | 0 | |

Source: AFC
Rules for classification: Qualification tiebreakers
(H) Hosts
6 September 2023
18:00

| Iraq | 13–0 | Macau |
|---|---|---|
| Lawend 9', 59' (pen.); Aoraha 15', 45+5'; Jasim 26', 45'; Fadhil 37', 47', 56'; Hassan 43'; Tahseen 61'; Younis 65'; Abdel Amir 86' | Report |

Al Kuwait Sports Club Stadium, Kuwait City
Attendance: 100
Referee: Venkatesh Ramachandran (India)
6 September 2023
20:00

| Kuwait | 4–0 | Timor-Leste |
|---|---|---|
| Al Taweel 7'; Al Qaisi 45'; Falah 53'; Al Bous 80' | Report |

Jaber Al-Ahmad International Stadium, Kuwait City
Attendance: 625
Referee: Tanimoto Ryo (Japan)

9 September 2023
18:00

| Timor-Leste | 0–6 | Iraq |
|---|---|---|
| | Report | Jasim 17'; Lawend 26' (pen.), 44', 64'; Mohammed 72'; Fadhil 90+1' |

Al Kuwait Sports Club Stadium, Kuwait City
Attendance: 50
Referee: Mahmood Salim Al Majarafi (Oman)
9 September 2023
20:00

| Macau | 0–3 | Kuwait |
|---|---|---|
| | Report | Al Awadi 48', 50', 90+5' |

Jaber Al-Ahmad International Stadium, Kuwait City
Attendance: 950
Referee: Kim Woo-sung (South Korea)

12 September 2023
18:00

| Timor-Leste | 5–0 | Macau |
|---|---|---|
| Mouzinho 13'; Rorinho 20'; Cristevão 60'; Zenivio 76'; Berdila 82' | Report |

Al Kuwait Sports Club Stadium, Kuwait City
Attendance: 100
Referee: Mahmood Salim Al Majarafi (Oman)
12 September 2023
20:00

| Iraq | 2–2 | Kuwait |
|---|---|---|
| Younis 69'; Saadoon 73' | Report | Al Awadi 48'; Al Salamah 65' |

Jaber Al-Ahmad International Stadium, Kuwait City
Attendance: 11,240
Referee: Salman Ahmad Falahi (Qatar)

=== Group G ===
- All matches were held in China.
- Times listed are UTC+8.

| Pos | Team | Pld | W | D | L | GF | GA | GD | Pts | Qualification |
|---|---|---|---|---|---|---|---|---|---|---|
| 1 | United Arab Emirates | 2 | 1 | 1 | 0 | 3 | 0 | +3 | 4 | Final tournament |
| 2 | China (H) | 2 | 1 | 1 | 0 | 2 | 1 | +1 | 4 | Final tournament |
| 3 | India | 2 | 0 | 0 | 2 | 1 | 5 | −4 | 0 | |
| 4 | Maldives (Note: Maldives withdrew from the tournament on 5 September 2023.) | 0 | 0 | 0 | 0 | 0 | 0 | 0 | 0 | Withdrew |

Source: AFC
Rules for classification: Qualification tiebreakers
(H) Hosts
Notes:
6 September 2023
19:35

| United Arab Emirates | 0–0 | China |
|---|---|---|
| | Report |

Dalian Suoyuwan Stadium, Dalian
Attendance: 6,472
Referee: Sivakorn Pu-udom (Thailand)

9 September 2023
19:35

| China | 2–1 | India |
|---|---|---|
| Tao Qianglong 68' (pen.); Nebijan 90+6' | Report | Hu Hetao 90+3' (o.g.) |

Dalian Suoyuwan Stadium, Dalian
Attendance: 13,818
Referee: Mohammad Arafah (Jordan)

12 September 2023
16:30

| United Arab Emirates | 3–0 | India |
|---|---|---|
| Abbas 26'; Adil 33'; Khalfan 64' | Report |

Dalian Sports Centre Stadium, Dalian
Attendance: 53
Referee: Razlan Joffri Ali (Malaysia)

=== Group H ===
- All matches were held in Thailand.
- Times listed are UTC+7.

| Pos | Team | Pld | W | D | L | GF | GA | GD | Pts | Qualification |
|---|---|---|---|---|---|---|---|---|---|---|
| 1 | Thailand (H) | 3 | 3 | 0 | 0 | 9 | 0 | +9 | 9 | Final tournament |
| 2 | Malaysia | 3 | 2 | 0 | 1 | 6 | 1 | +5 | 6 | Final tournament |
| 3 | Philippines | 3 | 1 | 0 | 2 | 1 | 9 | −8 | 3 | |
| 4 | Bangladesh | 3 | 0 | 0 | 3 | 0 | 6 | −6 | 0 | |

Source: AFC
Rules for classification: Qualification tiebreakers
(H) Hosts
6 September 2023
16:30

| Malaysia | 2–0 | Bangladesh |
|---|---|---|
| Izwan 81'; Tierney 90+4' | Report |

Chonburi Stadium, Chonburi
Attendance: 750
Referee: Omar Al Ali (United Arab Emirates)
6 September 2023
20:30

| Thailand | 5–0 | Philippines |
|---|---|---|
| Purachet 5'; Chatmongkol 21'; Teerasak 29'; Anan 71'; Yotsakorn 89' | Report |

Chonburi Stadium, Chonburi
Attendance: 1,425
Referee: Abdulla Al-Marri (Qatar)

9 September 2023
16:30

| Philippines | 0–4 | Malaysia |
|---|---|---|
| | Report | Mukhairi 1'; Saravanan 6', 61'; Harith 23' |

Chonburi Stadium, Chonburi
Attendance: 50
Referee: Ahmad Al-Ali (Kuwait)
9 September 2023
20:30

| Bangladesh | 0–3 | Thailand |
|---|---|---|
| | Report | Purachet 44', 45+3'; Airfan 87' |

Chonburi Stadium, Chonburi
Attendance: 1,500
Referee: Yusuf Al-Shamari (Qatar)

12 September 2023
16:30

| Bangladesh | 0–1 | Philippines |
|---|---|---|
| | Report | Muens 56' (pen.) |

Chonburi Stadium, Chonburi
Attendance: 300
Referee: Faisal Al-Balawi (Saudi Arabia)
12 September 2023
20:30

| Thailand | 1–0 | Malaysia |
|---|---|---|
| Yotsakorn 20' | Report |

Chonburi Stadium, Chonburi
Attendance: 2,450
Referee: Abdulla Al-Marri (Qatar)

=== Group I ===
- All matches were held in Tajikistan.
- Times listed are UTC+5.

| Pos | Team | Pld | W | D | L | GF | GA | GD | Pts | Qualification |
|---|---|---|---|---|---|---|---|---|---|---|
| 1 | Australia | 2 | 1 | 1 | 0 | 8 | 2 | +6 | 4 | Final tournament |
| 2 | Tajikistan (H) | 2 | 1 | 1 | 0 | 3 | 2 | +1 | 4 | Final tournament |
| 3 | Laos | 2 | 0 | 0 | 2 | 2 | 9 | −7 | 0 | |
| 4 | North Korea (Note: DPR Korea withdrew from the tournament on 8 August 2023.) | 0 | 0 | 0 | 0 | 0 | 0 | 0 | 0 | Withdrew |

Source: AFC
Rules for classification: Qualification tiebreakers
(H) Hosts
Notes:
6 September 2023
20:30

| Laos | 1–7 | Australia |
|---|---|---|
| Chanthavixay 12' | Report | Velupillay 2', 4'; D'Arrigo 7'; Botic 21', 55'; Brook 59'; Kuol 79' |

Central Republican Stadium, Dushanbe
Attendance: 200
Referee: Ahmad Alaeddin (Lebanon)

9 September 2023
20:30

| Tajikistan | 2–1 | Laos |
|---|---|---|
| Qurbonov 90+1'; Khailoev 90+4' | Report | Damoth 54' |

Central Republican Stadium, Dushanbe
Attendance: 5,200
Referee: Wissam Rabbie (Syria)

12 September 2023
20:30

| Australia | 1–1 | Tajikistan |
|---|---|---|
| Peupion 12' | Report | Soirov 28' |

Central Republican Stadium, Dushanbe
Attendance: 12,400
Referee: Rowan Arumughan (India)

=== Group J ===
- All matches were held in Saudi Arabia.
- Times listed are UTC+3.

| Pos | Team | Pld | W | D | L | GF | GA | GD | Pts | Qualification |
|---|---|---|---|---|---|---|---|---|---|---|
| 1 | Saudi Arabia (H) | 3 | 3 | 0 | 0 | 12 | 2 | +10 | 9 | Final tournament |
| 2 | Cambodia | 3 | 1 | 1 | 1 | 5 | 9 | −4 | 4 | |
| 3 | Lebanon | 3 | 0 | 2 | 1 | 3 | 6 | −3 | 2 | |
| 4 | Mongolia | 3 | 0 | 1 | 2 | 3 | 6 | −3 | 1 | |

Source: AFC
Rules for classification: Qualification tiebreakers
(H) Hosts
6 September 2023
16:00

| Cambodia | 2–2 | Lebanon |
|---|---|---|
| Sa Ty 45+1'; Sor Rotana 65' | Report | Nasser 7'; Mekkaoui 74' |

Prince Sultan bin Abdul Aziz Stadium, Abha
Attendance: 50
Referee: Wang Di (China)
6 September 2023
19:00

| Saudi Arabia | 3–1 | Mongolia |
|---|---|---|
| Al-Juwayr 87'; Radif 90+9'; Maran 90+14' | Report | Uuganbat 3' (pen.) |

Prince Sultan bin Abdul Aziz Stadium, Abha
Attendance: 490
Referee: Hussain Sinan (Maldives)

9 September 2023
16:00

| Mongolia | 1–2 | Cambodia |
|---|---|---|
| Gerelt-Od 54' | Report | Sor Ratana 30'; Sa Ty 45' |

Prince Sultan bin Abdul Aziz Stadium, Abha
Attendance: 47
Referee: Choi Hyun-jae (South Korea)
9 September 2023
19:00

| Lebanon | 0–3 | Saudi Arabia |
|---|---|---|
| | Report | Radif 11'; Al-Nasser 38'; Maran 90+4' |

Prince Sultan bin Abdul Aziz Stadium, Abha
Attendance: 388
Referee: Omar Al-Yaqoubi (Oman)

12 September 2023
16:00

| Lebanon | 1–1 | Mongolia |
|---|---|---|
| Haidar 37' (pen.) | Report | Chinzorig 33' |

Prince Sultan bin Abdul Aziz Stadium, Abha
Attendance: 65
Referee: Omar Al-Yaqoubi (Oman)
12 September 2023
19:00

| Saudi Arabia | 6–1 | Cambodia |
|---|---|---|
| A. Al-Ghamdi 6', 18'; Radif 26', 56'; Al-Juwayr 39'; Abu Al-Shamat 87' | Report | Sa Ty 5' |

Prince Sultan bin Abdul Aziz Stadium, Abha
Attendance: 425
Referee: Mohammad Mofeed Naser Ghabayen (Jordan)

=== Group K ===
- All matches were held in Indonesia.
- Times listed are UTC+7

| Pos | Team | Pld | W | D | L | GF | GA | GD | Pts | Qualification |
|---|---|---|---|---|---|---|---|---|---|---|
| 1 | Indonesia (H) | 2 | 2 | 0 | 0 | 11 | 0 | +11 | 6 | Final tournament |
| 2 | Turkmenistan | 2 | 1 | 0 | 1 | 4 | 2 | +2 | 3 | |
| 3 | Chinese Taipei | 2 | 0 | 0 | 2 | 0 | 13 | −13 | 0 | |

Source: AFC
Rules for classification: Qualification tiebreakers
(H) Hosts
6 September 2023
19:00

| Chinese Taipei | 0–4 | Turkmenistan |
|---|---|---|
| | Report | Hydyrow 25', 62', 78'; Rozyýew 76' |

Manahan Stadium, Surakarta
Attendance: 120
Referee: Ismaeel Habib (Bahrain)

9 September 2023
19:00

| Indonesia | 9–0 | Chinese Taipei |
|---|---|---|
| Marselino 2', 58'; Sananta 6'; Struick 19'; Witan 29'; Rio Fahmi 40'; Baggott 56'; Hokky 78'; Arhan 85' | Report |

Manahan Stadium, Surakarta
Attendance: 14,540
Referee: Shukri Hussain (Saudi Arabia)

12 September 2023
19:00

| Turkmenistan | 0–2 | Indonesia |
|---|---|---|
| | Report | Jenner 40'; Arhan 90+2' |

Manahan Stadium, Surakarta
Attendance: 15,890
Referee: Kim Dae-yong (South Korea)

== Ranking of runners-up ==
- The four best-ranked runners-up also qualified for the final tournament.
- Due to groups being different sizes, results against fourth-place teams were not used to calculate the ranking; Group B matches against Qatar were treated as friendlies and were not used to determine group standing.

| Pos | Grp | Team | Pld | W | D | L | GF | GA | GD | Pts | Qualification |
|---|---|---|---|---|---|---|---|---|---|---|---|
| 1 | F | Kuwait | 2 | 1 | 1 | 0 | 6 | 2 | +4 | 4 | Final tournament |
| 2 | I | Tajikistan | 2 | 1 | 1 | 0 | 3 | 2 | +1 | 4 | Final tournament |
| 3 | G | China | 2 | 1 | 1 | 0 | 2 | 1 | +1 | 4 | Final tournament |
| 4 | H | Malaysia | 2 | 1 | 0 | 1 | 4 | 1 | +3 | 3 (Note: Disciplinary points: Malaysia –4, Iran –7.) | Final tournament |
| 5 | E | Iran | 2 | 1 | 0 | 1 | 4 | 1 | +3 | 3 | |
| 6 | K | Turkmenistan | 2 | 1 | 0 | 1 | 4 | 2 | +2 | 3 | |
| 7 | C | Yemen | 2 | 1 | 0 | 1 | 3 | 1 | +2 | 3 | |
| 8 | A | Oman | 2 | 1 | 0 | 1 | 2 | 1 | +1 | 3 | |
| 9 | D | Palestine | 2 | 1 | 0 | 1 | 1 | 1 | 0 | 3 | |
| 10 | B | Kyrgyzstan | 2 | 0 | 1 | 1 | 1 | 2 | −1 | 1 | |
| 11 | J | Cambodia | 2 | 0 | 1 | 1 | 3 | 8 | −5 | 1 | |

Source: AFC
Rules for classification: 1) Points; 2) Goal difference; 3) Goals scored; 4) Lower disciplinary points total; 5) Drawing of lots.

== Goalscorers ==
There were 152 individuals who scored at least 1 goal.

There were 215 goals scored in 57 matches, for an average of 3.77 goals per match.

6 goals

- (Uzbekistan) Khusayin Norchaev

5 goals

- (Iraq) Hussein Lawend

4 goals

- (Iraq) Ridha Fadhil
- (Kuwait) Salman Al-Awadi
- (Saudi Arabia) Abdullah Radif

3 goals

- (Iraq) Ali Jasim
- (Jordan) Waseem Al-Riyalat
- (Qatar) Tameem Al-Abdullah
- (Syria) Mohamad Rihanieh
- (Syria) Mustafa Abdullatif
- (Thailand) Purachet Thodsanit
- (Turkmenistan) Samammet Hydyrow
- (Uzbekistan) Ulugbek Khoshimov
- (Yemen) Ahmed Maher

2 goals

- (Australia) Nishan Velupillay
- (Australia) Noah Botic
- (Bahrain) Sayed Jawad Haider
- (Cambodia) Sa Ty
- (Cambodia) Sor Rotana
- (Indonesia) Marselino Ferdinan
- (Indonesia) Pratama Arhan
- (Iran) Allahyar Sayyadmanesh
- (Iran) Mohammad Ghorbani
- (Iraq) Alexander Aoraha
- (Iraq) Dhulfiqar Younis
- (Japan) Mao Hosoya
- (Japan) Shunsuke Mito
- (Jordan) Amin Al-Shanaineh
- (Jordan) Reziq Bani Hani
- (Malaysia) T. Saravanan
- (Palestine) Khaled Al-Nabris
- (Qatar) Ahmed Al-Rawi
- (Qatar) Lotfi Madjer
- (Saudi Arabia) Ahmed Al-Ghamdi
- (Saudi Arabia) Mohammed Maran
- (Saudi Arabia) Musab Al-Juwayr
- (Thailand) Yotsakorn Burapha
- (Uzbekistan) Abbosbek Fayzullaev
- (Uzbekistan) Alisher Odilov
- (Uzbekistan) Jasurbek Jaloliddinov
- (Vietnam) Bùi Vĩ Hào

1 goal

- (Afghanistan) Omid Musawi
- (Australia) Alou Kuol
- (Australia) Cameron Peupion
- (Australia) Lachlan Brook
- (Australia) Louis D'Arrigo
- (Bahrain) Hussein Abdulkarim
- (China) Tao Qianglong
- (China) Nebijan Muhmet
- (Guam) Micah Thomas
- (Guam) Riku Meyar
- (Indonesia) Elkan Baggott
- (Indonesia) Hokky Caraka
- (Indonesia) Ivar Jenner
- (Indonesia) Rafael Struick
- (Indonesia) Ramadhan Sananta
- (Indonesia) Rio Fahmi
- (Indonesia) Witan Sulaeman
- (Iran) Amin Hazbavi
- (Iran) Hossein Goodarzi
- (Iran) Mohammad Javad Hosseinnejad
- (Iraq) Blnd Hassan
- (Iraq) Muntadher Abdulameer
- (Iraq) Muntadher Mohammed
- (Iraq) Mustafa Saadoon
- (Iraq) Zaid Tahseen
- (Japan) Joel Chima Fujita
- (Japan) Ryuya Nishio
- (Japan) Shota Fujio
- (Jordan) Mohammad Abualnadi
- (Jordan) Mohannad Abu Taha
- (Jordan) Seif Darwish
- (Kuwait) Bandar Al Salamah
- (Kuwait) Hamad Al Taweel
- (Kuwait) Mohsen Falah
- (Kuwait) Salman Al Bous
- (Kuwait) Talal Al Qaisi
- (Kyrgyzstan) Khristiyan Brauzman
- (Laos) Chanthavixay Khounthoumphone
- (Laos) Damoth Thongkhamsavath
- (Lebanon) Karim Mekkaoui
- (Lebanon) Mohammad Nasser
- (Lebanon) Mohammad Sami Haidar
- (Malaysia) Aliff Izwan
- (Malaysia) Fergus Tierney
- (Malaysia) Harith Haiqal
- (Malaysia) Mukhairi Ajmal
- (Mongolia) Bat-Orgil Gerelt-Od
- (Mongolia) Filip Chinzorig
- (Mongolia) Temuulen Uuganbat
- (Myanmar) Kaung Htet Paing
- (Oman) Ahad Al-Mashaikhi
- (Oman) Mamoon Said Al-Araimi
- (Oman) Nasser Al-Rawahi
- (Oman) Nibras Al-Maashari
- (Oman) Salem Al-Abdulsalam
- (Pakistan) Alamgir Ghazi
- (Pakistan) Harun Hamid
- (Palestine) Zaid Qunbar
- (Philippines) Gavin Muens
- (Qatar) Ilyes Brimil
- (Qatar) Mohamed Khaled Hassan
- (Saudi Arabia) Mohammed Abu Al-Shamat
- (Saudi Arabia) Saad Al-Nasser
- (Singapore) Farhan Zulkifli
- (Singapore) Zikos Chua
- (South Korea) Hong Yun-sang
- (South Korea) Jeon Byung-kwan
- (South Korea) Oh Jae-hyeok
- (South Korea) Paik Sang-hoon
- (Syria) Ahmad Hatem
- (Syria) Almekdad Ahmad
- (Syria) Hozan Osman
- (Syria) Mahmoud Nayef
- (Syria) Oliver Kass Kawo
- (Tajikistan) Ruslan Khailoev
- (Tajikistan) Rustam Soirov
- (Tajikistan) Sodiqjon Qurbonov
- (Thailand) Airfan Doloh
- (Thailand) Anan Yodsangwal
- (Thailand) Chatmongkol Rueangthanarot
- (Thailand) Teerasak Poeiphimai
- (Timor-Leste) Cristevão Fernandes
- (Timor-Leste) Luis Berdila
- (Timor-Leste) Mouzinho
- (Timor-Leste) Ricardo Rorinho
- (Timor-Leste) Zenivio
- (Turkmenistan) Nurmyrat Rozyýew
- (United Arab Emirates) Eisa Khalfan
- (United Arab Emirates) Mohammed Abbas
- (United Arab Emirates) Sultan Adil
- (Uzbekistan) Alibek Davronov
- (Uzbekistan) Mukhammadkodir Khamraliev
- (Uzbekistan) Umarali Rakhmonaliev
- (Vietnam) Hoàng Văn Toản
- (Vietnam) Hồ Văn Cường
- (Vietnam) Lê Văn Đô
- (Vietnam) Nguyễn Đình Bắc
- (Vietnam) Nguyễn Hữu Nam
- (Vietnam) Nguyễn Thanh Nhàn
- (Vietnam) Nguyễn Văn Tùng
- (Yemen) Gassem Al-Sharafi
- (Yemen) Hamzah Hanash
- (Yemen) Hamzah Mahross
- (Yemen) Mohammed Al-Qashmi
- (Yemen) Saqr Ebrahim Al-Harbi

1 own goal

- (Brunei) Nazhan Zulkifle (against Jordan)
- (Brunei) Wafiq Danish (against Jordan)
- (China) Hu Hetao (against India)
- (Hong Kong) Yip Cheuk Man (against Uzbekistan)
- (Lebanon) Ibrahim Chami (against Cambodia)
- (Vietnam) Nguyễn Hồng Phúc (against Singapore)

== Qualified teams ==
The following teams qualified for the 2024 AFC U-23 Asian Cup.

| Team | Qualified as | Qualified on | Previous qualifications |
|---|---|---|---|
| Qatar | Hosts | 30 September 2022 | 4 (2016, 2018, 2020, 2022) |
| Jordan | Group A winners | 12 September 2023 | 5 (2013, 2016, 2018, 2020, 2022) |
| South Korea | Group B winners | 12 September 2023 | 5 (2013, 2016, 2018, **2020**, 2022) |
| Vietnam | Group C winners | 9 September 2023 | 4 (2016, 2018, 2020, 2022) |
| Japan | Group D winners | 12 September 2023 | 5 (2013, **2016**, 2018, 2020, 2022) |
| Uzbekistan | Group E winners | 12 September 2023 | 5 (2013, 2016, **2018**, 2020, 2022) |
| Iraq | Group F winners | 12 September 2023 | 5 (**2013**, 2016, 2018, 2020, 2022) |
| United Arab Emirates | Group G winners | 12 September 2023 | 4 (2013, 2016, 2020, 2022) |
| Thailand | Group H winners | 12 September 2023 | 4 (2016, 2018, 2020, 2022) |
| Australia | Group I winners | 12 September 2023 | 5 (2013, 2016, 2018, 2020, 2022) |
| Saudi Arabia | Group J winners | 12 September 2023 | 5 (2013, 2016, 2018, 2020, **2022**) |
| Indonesia | Group K winners | 12 September 2023 | 0 (debut) |
| Kuwait | Best runners-up | 12 September 2023 | 2 (2013, 2022) |
| Tajikistan | 2nd Best runners-up | 12 September 2023 | 1 (2022) |
| China | 3rd Best runners-up | 12 September 2023 | 4 (2013, 2016, 2018, 2020) |
| Malaysia | 4th Best runners-up | 12 September 2023 | 2 (2018, 2022) |

Bold indicates champions for that year. Italic indicates hosts for that year.

== See also ==
- 2024 AFC Women's Olympic Qualifying Tournament
- 2024 AFC U-20 Women's Asian Cup qualification
- 2024 AFC U-17 Women's Asian Cup qualification
