= 2024 AFC U-23 Asian Cup final =

- Jassim bin Hamad Stadium in Al Rayyan hosted the final.
- Event: 2024 AFC U-23 Asian Cup
Japan	Uzbekistan
(Japan)	(Uzbekistan)
1	0
- Date: 3 May 2024
- Venue: Jassim bin Hamad Stadium, Al Rayyan
- Referee: Mooud Bonyadifard (Iran)
- Attendance: 12,276

The 2024 AFC U-23 Asian Cup final was a football match that took place on 3 May 2024 at the Jassim bin Hamad Stadium in Al Rayyan, Qatar, to determine the winners of the 2024 AFC U-23 Asian Cup. The match was contested by Japan and Uzbekistan, the winners of the semi-finals.

Japan won the final 1–0 to triumph for the second time in their participation history.

== Route to the final ==
Japan
Round
Uzbekistan
Opponents
Result
Group stage
Opponents
Result
China
1–0
Match 1
Malaysia
2–0
United Arab Emirates
2–0
Match 2
Kuwait
5–0
South Korea
0–1
Match 3
Vietnam
3–0
Group B Runners-up

Pos	Team	Pld	Pts
1	South Korea	3	9
2	Japan	3	6
3	China	3	3
4	United Arab Emirates	3	0

Source: AFC
Final standings
Group D Winner

Pos	Team	Pld	Pts
1	Uzbekistan	3	9
2	Vietnam	3	6
3	Kuwait	3	3
4	Malaysia	3	0

Source: AFC
Opponents
Result
Knockout stage
Opponents
Result
Qatar
4–2 (a.e.t.)
Quarter-finals
Saudi Arabia
2–0
Iraq
2–0
Semi-finals
Indonesia
2–0

== Match ==
3 May 2024
18:30

Japan	1–0	Uzbekistan
Yamada 90+1'	Report

Jassim bin Hamad Stadium, Al Rayyan
Attendance: 12,276
Referee: Mooud Bonyadifard (Iran)

Japan	Uzbekistan

GK	1	Leo Kokubo
RB	4	Hiroki Sekine
CB	22	Kota Takai
CB	5	Seiji Kimura	(yellow card) 75'
LB	21	Ayumu Ohata		(substituted off) 90+4'
CM	7	Rihito Yamamoto		(substituted off) 72'
CM	8	Joel Chima Fujita (c)
RW	9	Shota Fujio	(yellow card) 7'	(substituted off) 62'
AM	17	Kuryu Matsuki		(substituted off) 62'
LW	10	Kein Sato		(substituted off) 71'
CF	19	Mao Hosoya	(yellow card) 16'
Substitutions:
FW	13	Ryotaro Araki		(substituted on) 62'
MF	20	Yu Hirakawa		(substituted on) 62'
MF	11	Fuki Yamada		(substituted on) 71'
MF	6	Sota Kawasaki		(substituted on) 72'
DF	16	Takashi Uchino		(substituted on) 90+4'
Manager:
Go Oiwa

GK	1	Abduvohid Nematov	(yellow card) 79'
RB	2	Saidazamat Mirsaidov		(substituted off) 75'
CB	5	Mukhammadkodir Khamraliev
CB	18	Alibek Davronov
LB	6	Ibrokhimkhalil Yuldoshev
CM	23	Abdurauf Buriev
CM	17	Diyor Kholmatov		(substituted off) 90+3'
RW	20	Ruslanbek Jiyanov		(substituted off) 75'
AM	10	Jasurbek Jaloliddinov (c)		(substituted off) 85'
LW	22	Alisher Odilov
CF	19	Khusayin Norchaev		(substituted off) 90+3'
Substitutions:
DF	3	Zafarmurod Abdurakhmatov	(yellow card) 90+13'	(substituted on) 75'
FW	9	Ulugbek Khoshimov		(substituted on) 75'
MF	8	Ibrokhim Ibrokhimov		(substituted on) 85'
FW	11	Otabek Jurakuziev		(substituted on) 90+3'
MF	15	Umarali Rakhmonaliev		(substituted on) 90+3'
Manager:
Timur Kapadze

Match rules:

- 90 minutes.
- 30 minutes of extra time if necessary.
- Penalty shoot-out if scores still level.
- Maximum of five substitutions, one substitution added if extra time.

== See also ==
- 2024 AFC U-23 Asian Cup
