= Hiroki Sekine =

Japanese footballer (born 2002)

Hiroki Sekine 関根 大輝
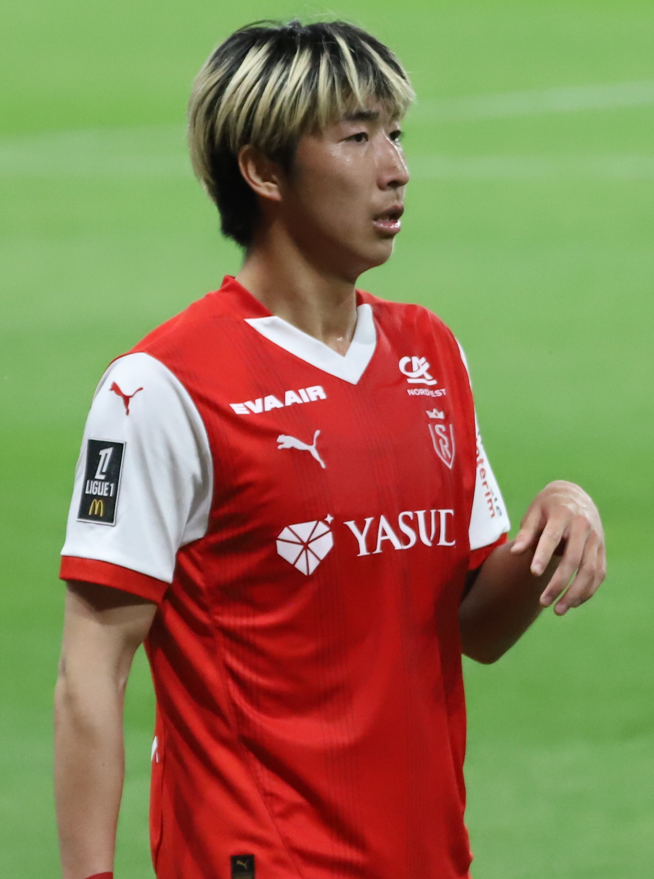
- Sekine in 2025 with Reims

Personal information
- Date of birth: 11 August 2002 (age 24)
- Place of birth: Shizuoka City, Shizuoka, Japan
- Height: 1.87 m (6 ft 2 in)
- Position: Right back

Team information
- Current team: Holstein Kiel (on loan from Reims)
- Number: 32

Youth career
- Tohgendai FC
- 2014–2016: Shizuoka Gakuen Junior High School
- 2017–2019: Shizuoka Gakuen High School

College career
Years	Team	Apps	(Gls)
2020–2023	Takushoku University		

Senior career*
Years	Team	Apps	(Gls)
2023–2025	Kashiwa Reysol	31	(0)
2025–	Reims	39	(0)
2026–	→ Holstein Kiel (loan)	0	(0)

International career^{‡}
2022–2024	Japan U23	17	(0)
2025–	Japan	3	(0)
Medal record
Representing Japan
Asian Games
Silver medal – second place	2022 Hangzhou	Team
AFC U-23 Asian Cup
Gold medal – first place	2024 Qatar	Team
- * Club domestic league appearances and goals as of 26 June 2026 ‡ National team caps and goals as of 9 September 2025

Hiroki Sekine (関根 大輝, Sekine Hiroki; born 11 August 2002) is a Japanese professional footballer who plays as a right back for 2. Bundesliga club Holstein Kiel, on loan from Ligue 2 club Reims, and the Japan national team.

== Club career ==
Born in Shizuoka, Sekine attended the Shizuoka Gakuen High School. He won the All Japan High School Soccer Tournament in 2019 with his high school team as a back-up center back. After graduating from high school in 2021, he was didn't receive any contract offer from professional clubs, leading him to enter the Takushoku University. Here, he was repositioned to play as a right back.

=== Kashiwa Reysol ===
In May 2023, Kashiwa Reysol announced the signature of Sekine from 2025 and registered him in the squad as a "specially designated player". On 24 May 2023, he made his professional debut in his team's 0–1 away defeat against Kashima Antlers, as part of the 2023 J.League Cup. He officially joined Kashiwa Reysol, one year earlier than the scheduled transfer. He quickly gain a starter spot at the club, starting in all 7 J1 League games before leaving the team to participate in the U-23 Asian Cup.

=== Reims ===
On 12 January 2025, Sekine signed with Reims in France. On 26 June 2026, Sekine was loaned by Holstein Kiel in German 2. Bundesliga, with an option to buy.

== International career ==
Sekine was parto of the Japan U23 squad that won the silver medal in the 2022 Asian Games.

On 4 April 2024, Sekine was called up to the Japan U23 squad for the 2024 AFC U-23 Asian Cup. In the 2024 AFC U-23 Asian Cup final, while Japan was leading 1–0 against Uzbekistan, he conceded a penalty in the 96th minute. Leo Kokubo later saved the penalty shot from Umarali Rakhmonaliev, securing the title for Japan. In July 2024, he was named in Japan's squad for the 2024 Summer Olympics.

In October 2024, he received his first call up to the Japan national team, replacing the injured Kota Takai for the 2026 FIFA World Cup qualification matches against Saudi Arabia and Australia.

He made his senior team debut in away match against Australia at June 2025.

== Career statistics ==
=== Club ===
As of 29 May 2025

Appearances and goals by club, season and competition
Club	Season	League			National cup		League cup		Other		Total	
Club	Season	Division	Apps	Goals	Apps	Goals	Apps	Goals	Apps	Goals	Apps	Goals
Kashiwa Reysol	2023	J1 League	0	0	0	0	1	0	—		1	0
Kashiwa Reysol	2024	J1 League	31	0	1	0	0	0	—		32	0
Kashiwa Reysol	Total		31	0	1	0	1	0	—		33	0
Reims	2024–25	Ligue 1	15	0	4	0	—		2 (Note: Appearances in Ligue 1 relegation/promotion play-offs)	0	21	0
Reims	2025–26	Ligue 2	0	0	0	0	—		—		0	0
Reims	Total		15	0	4	0	—		2	0	21	0
Career total			46	0	5	0	1	0	2	0	54	0

=== International ===
As of match played 9 September 2025

Appearances and goals by national team and year
National team	Year	Apps	Goals
Japan	2025	3	0
Total		3	0

== Honours ==
Reims

- Coupe de France runner-up: 2024–25

Japan U23

- AFC U-23 Asian Cup: 2024
- Asian Games Silver Medal: 2022
