= Dhulfiqar Younis =

Iraqi footballer

Personal information
- Full name: Dhulfiqar Younis Abed Ali
- Date of birth: 27 May 2001 (age 25)
- Place of birth: Iraq
- Position: Striker

Team information
- Current team: Duhok (on loan from Al-Shorta)

Youth career
- –2022: Al-Shorta

Senior career*
Years	Team	Apps	(Gls)
2022–	Al-Shorta	3	(0)
2023–	→ Duhok (loan)		

International career^{‡}
2019–2020	Iraq U-18		
2021–2022	Iraq U-20		
2023–	Iraq U-23		
- * Club domestic league appearances and goals as of 1 August 2024 ‡ National team caps and goals as of 1 August 2024

Dhulfiqar Younis Al-Imari (Arabic: ذُو الْفِقَار يُونُس عَبْد عَلِيّ, born 27 May 2001) is an Iraqi professional football player who plays as a striker for Duhok, on loan from Al-Shorta, in the Iraq Stars League and the Iraq U-23 national team.

== Club career ==
Dhulfiqar spent his entire youth career at Al-Shorta, where his father Younis Abed Ali was a legend having played for them, managed them, captained them and won the golden boot with them. He came up through their youth ranks and was promoted to the first team in 2022.

In September 2023 Duhok signed Younis on loan for the upcoming Iraq Stars League season stating that he was a valuable addition to the side and would help improve their team. In July 2024, Younis scored the winning goal in the play-off final against Al-Najaf to qualify Duhok for the AGCFF Gulf Club Champions League the following season.

== International career ==
In June 2021, Younis was called up to the Iraq U-20 national team for the U-20 Arab Cup in Egypt. The following year he was once again called up to the Iraq U-20 national team for a training camp in Baghdad ahead of the next U-20 Arab Cup. In September 2022, Younis was one of 5 players that Iraq U-20 manager Emad Mohammed said he was impressed by and added to his national team squad after the end of the Iraqi Youth Premier League season. He was called up to a training camp in Baghdad where the team would play three friendlies.

In March 2023, Dhulfiqar was called up to the Iraq U-23 national team for the International Doha Tournament in Qatar. In June 2023, Younis was once again called up to the Iraq U-23s for the 2023 WAFF U-23 Championship, which was being hosted in Iraq and which Iraq would win. Dhulfiqar scored for Iraq's U-23s in a 3-0 friendly win over Yemen in August 2023. In September 2023, Younis was included in Iraq's final squad for the U-23 Asian Cup qualifiers in Kuwait. The young striker scored in Iraq's final match against Kuwait, which ended in a 2–2 draw and left Iraq at the top of the group and qualified for the 2024 AFC U-23 Asian Cup in Qatar. Following the qualifiers, he remained part of the squad that travelled to Morocco for friendlies against Morocco and the Dominican Republic.

== Honours ==
Al-Shorta

- Iraqi Premier League: 2022–23

Duhok

- Iraq FA Cup: 2024–25
- AGCFF Gulf Club Champions League: 2024–25

Iraq U-23

- WAFF U-23 Championship: 2023
