= Rafael Struick =

Indonesian footballer (born 2003)

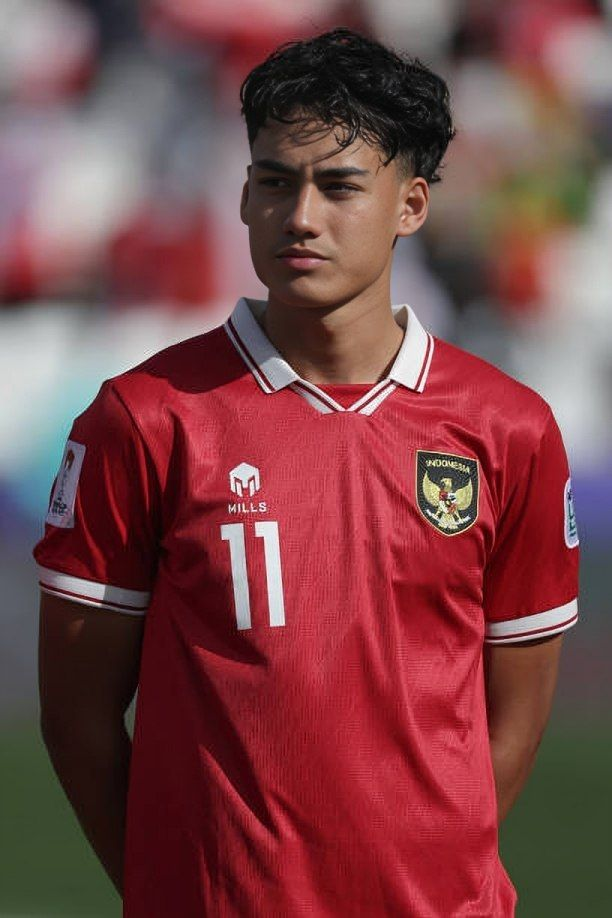
- Struick playing for Indonesia at the 2023 AFC Asian Cup

Personal information
- Full name: Rafael William Struick
- Date of birth: 27 March 2003 (age 23)
- Place of birth: Leidschendam, Netherlands
- Height: 1.85 m (6 ft 1 in)
- Position: Forward

Team information
- Current team: Dewa United Banten
- Number: 27

Youth career
- Forum Sport
- –2020: RKAVV
- 2020–2021: ADO Den Haag

Senior career*
Years	Team	Apps	(Gls)
2022–2024	ADO Den Haag	9	(0)
2024–2025	Brisbane Roar	10	(1)
2025–	Dewa United Banten	29	(1)

International career^{‡}
2022	Indonesia U20	1	(1)
2023–2025	Indonesia U23	17	(5)
2023–	Indonesia	26	(1)
- * Club domestic league appearances and goals as of 31 October 2026 ‡ National team caps and goals as of 12 December 2025

Rafael William Struick (born 27 March 2003) is a professional footballer who plays as a forward for Super League club Dewa United Banten. Born in the Netherlands, he represents the Indonesia national team.

== Club career ==
=== Youth career ===
Struick played in the youth of RKAVV in and then at Forum Sport, before joining the academy at ADO Den Haag.

=== ADO Den Haag ===
Struick made his Eerste Divisie debut on 6 May 2022 against FC Emmen. Following this, in June 2022, he signed his first professional contract with ADO Den Haag.

=== Brisbane Roar ===
In September 2024, Struick signed for A-League Men club Brisbane Roar. On 19 October 2024, Struick made his debut for the club against Auckland FC.

In the next match on 1 November 2024, Struick scored his first professional league goal, in a 2–3 home loss against Sydney FC.

== International career ==
=== Youth ===
On 19 November 2022, Struick made an appearance with Indonesia U-20 and scored a goal against Slovakia U-20 in a 1–2 loss. He is eligible for Indonesia because his paternal grandmother from both of his parents are Javanese and emigrated to the Netherlands. Indonesia manager Shin Tae-yong pointed to the selection of Struick, Ivar Jenner and Justin Hubner as foreign based players ahead of Indonesia hosting the 2023 FIFA U-20 World Cup.

On 29 August 2023, Struick received a call up to the under-23 team for the 2024 AFC U-23 Asian Cup qualification. He made his debut for the under-23 team against Chinese Taipei, where he also scored a goal in a 9–0 win.

In April 2024, Struick was named in the Indonesia under-23 final squad for the 2024 AFC U-23 Asian Cup held in Qatar. On 25 April, he scored a brace against South Korea in a 2–2 draw. Indonesia won 11–10 on penalties, advancing to the semi-finals.

=== Senior ===
On 27 May 2023, Struick received a called up for the senior team for the friendly matches against Palestine and Argentina. He earned his first cap for his country in a 0–0 friendly draw with Palestine.

Struick participated at the 2023 AFC Asian Cup tournament, where he played in all matches and helped the team reached their first-ever knockout stage.

On 10 October 2024, Struick scored his first senior goal in a World Cup Qualifying match against Bahrain, giving Indonesia a 2–1 lead, before the game ended in a 2–2 draw.

== Personal life ==
Born in the Netherlands, Struick has Indonesian ancestry through both of his parents. His father is a Dutch citizen of Indonesian descent, while his mother is of both Surinamese and Javanese ancestry.

On 22 May 2023, Struick officially obtained Indonesian citizenship.

== Career statistics ==
=== Club ===
As of match played 31 October 2026

Appearances and goals by club, season and competition
Club	Season	League			Cup		Other		Total	
Club	Season	Division	Apps	Goals	Apps	Goals	Apps	Goals	Apps	Goals
ADO Den Haag	2021–22	Eerste Divisie	1	0	–		1 (Note: Appearances in the Eredivisie play-offs)	0	2	0
ADO Den Haag	2022–23	Eerste Divisie	2	0	0	0	0	0	2	0
ADO Den Haag	2023–24	Eerste Divisie	3	0	1	0	0	0	4	0
ADO Den Haag	2024–25	Eerste Divisie	3	0	0	0	0	0	3	0
ADO Den Haag	Total		9	0	1	0	1	0	11	0
Brisbane Roar	2024–25	A-League Men	10	1	0	0	0	0	10	1
Dewa United Banten	2025–26	Super League	21	0	–		3 (Note: Appearances in AFC Challenge League)	1	24	1
Dewa United Banten	2026–27	Super League	8	1	0	0	–		8	1
Dewa United Banten	Total		29	1	0	0	3	1	32	1
Career total			48	2	1	0	4	1	53	3

=== International ===
As of match played 20 March 2025

Appearances and goals by national team and year
National team	Year	Apps	Goals
Indonesia	2023	4	0
Indonesia	2024	21	1
Indonesia	2025	1	0
Total		26	1

As of match played 10 October 2024
Scores and results list Indonesia's goal tally first, score column indicates score after each Struick goal.

List of international goals scored by Rafael Struick
No.	Date	Venue	Cap	Opponent	Score	Result	Competition
1	10 October 2024	Bahrain National Stadium, Riffa, Bahrain	18	Bahrain	2–1	2–2	2026 FIFA World Cup qualification

== Honours ==
Individual

- AFC U-23 Asian Cup Goal of the Tournament: 2024

== See also ==
- List of Indonesia international footballers born outside Indonesia
