= Montader Abdel-Amir =

Iraqi footballer (born 2001)

Personal information
- Full name: Montader Abdel-Amir Hadi
- Date of birth: 6 October 2001 (age 25)
- Place of birth: Karbala, Iraq
- Height: 1.65 m (5 ft 5 in)
- Position: Forward

Team information
- Current team: Baghdad
- Number: 26

Youth career
- 2016–2019: Al-Quwa Al-Jawiya

Senior career*
| Years | Team | Apps | (Gls) |
| 2019–2023 | Al-Quwa Al-Jawiya | | |
| 2019–2021 | → Al-Karkh (loan) | | |
| 2023 | Zakho | | |
| 2024–2025 | Al-Zawraa | | |
| 2025-2026 | Al-Karma | | |
| 2026- | Baghdad | | |

International career^{‡}
| 2017 | Iraq U-16 | | |
| 2018–2019 | Iraq U-18 | | |
| 2019–2020 | Iraq U-20 | | |
| 2021–2024 | Iraq U-23 | | |
- * Club domestic league appearances and goals as of 1 August 2024 ‡ National team caps and goals as of 1 August 2024

Montader Abdel-Amir Hadi (Arabic: مُنْتَظِر عَبْد الْأَمِير هَادِي; born 6 October 2001) is an Iraqi professional footballer who plays as a forward for Al-Zawraa in the Iraq Stars League.

== Club career ==
=== Al-Karkh ===
Born in Karbala, Montader came up through the youth teams of Iraqi giants Al-Quwa Al-Jawiya, joining the first team in 2019 before going out on loan to Al-Karkh, where he would get his first taste of senior football in the Iraqi Premier League. After a successful debut season where he established himself at the Baghdad club and the Iraq U-20 national team, Montader extended his loan for a second season, thanking the club for giving him his first opportunity in football and praising their reputation for developing young players into the best in Iraq.

=== Al-Quwa Al-Jawiya ===
Montader returned to his parent club in the summer of 2021 and featured regularly in the team over the next season, including the 2022 AFC Champions League where he was described as being Al-Jawiya’s “winning card”. Al-Jawiya extended his contract in the summer of 2022, keeping him at the club for the following season. Abdel Amir became a regular in the team and helped his side to win the Iraq Cup, beating Erbil in the final. In September 2023, Montader did not train with his teammates for several sessions whilst Al-Jawiya were preparing for their Champions League match against Uzbek side FC AGMK, because of a falling out with manager Ayoub Odisho and was seeking a move to arch rivals Al-Zawraa.

=== Zakho & Al-Zawraa ===
Zakho, who had gone on a shopping spree for several Brazilians in addition to national team veterans Ahmad Ibrahim and Amjad Attwan, announced that they had completed the signing of Montader from Al-Quwa Al-Jawiya as they looked to break into the Iraq Stars League's top four. After just half a season with the Kurdish club, Al-Zawraa showed strong interest in the young forward and pushed to sign him on the last day of the 2024 winter transfer window.

== International career ==
Montader was called up to the Iraq U-19 national team in August 2018 to represent his country at the 2018 U-19 Asian Cup in Indonesia. The following year, in August 2019, he helped his country win the first ever U-18 West Asian Championship in Palestine with the Iraq U-18 national team. In February 2020, Montader was part of the Iraq U-20 squad that reached the quarter finals of the 2020 U-20 Arab Cup.

In October 2021, Montader was called up to the Iraq U-23 national team for the 2021 WAFF U-23 Championship in Saudi Arabia where he would reach the semi-finals. He would remain in the squad for the 2022 AFC U-23 Asian Cup qualifiers later that month, where he helped his country qualify. Iraq would reach the quarter-finals of the Asian Cup before getting knocked out by hosts Uzbekistan. In March 2023, Montader was recalled to the U-23 national team for the Doha International U-23 Cup. In June 2023, he was called up again for the 2023 WAFF U-23 Championship, which they would win. Montader was recalled to the Iraq U-23s in December 2023 for a training camp in preparation for the 2024 AFC U-23 Asian Cup. He would be part of the final squad that would go to Qatar for the Asian Cup in April where he would help Iraq finish in third place and qualify for the Olympics in Paris. In June 2024, Montader was called up to the Olympic squad.

== Honours ==
Al-Quwa Al-Jawiya

- Iraq FA Cup: 2022–23

Iraq U-18

- WAFF U-18 Championship: 2019

Iraq U-23

- WAFF U-23 Championship: 2023
- AFC U-23 Asian Cup third place: 2024
