= Justin Hubner =

Indonesian footballer (born 2003)

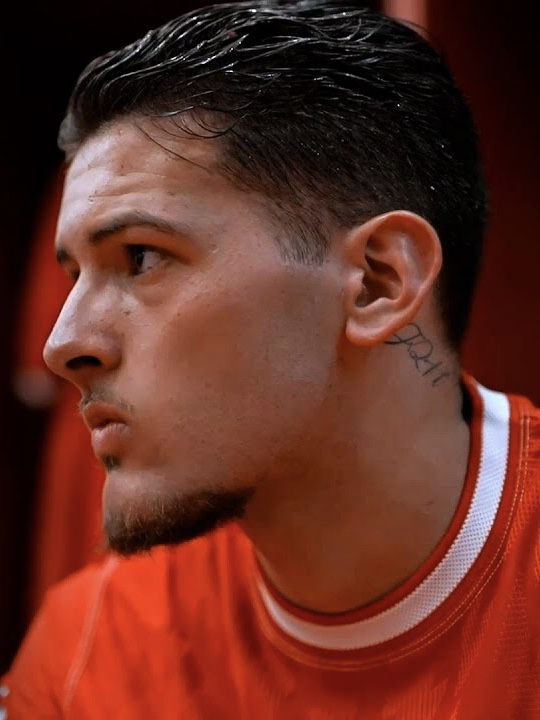
- Hubner with Indonesia in 2024

Personal information
- Full name: Justin Quincy Hubner
- Date of birth: 14 September 2003 (age 23)
- Place of birth: 's-Hertogenbosch, Netherlands
- Height: 1.87 m (6 ft 2 in)
- Positions: Centre-back; defensive midfielder

Team information
- Current team: Fortuna Sittard
- Number: 28

Youth career
- Brabant United
- Willem II
- 2017–2019: Den Bosch
- 2020–2025: Wolverhampton Wanderers

Senior career*
Years	Team	Apps	(Gls)
2023–2025	Wolverhampton Wanderers	0	(0)
2024	→ Cerezo Osaka (loan)	6	(0)
2025–	Fortuna Sittard	38	(2)

International career^{‡}
2021–2022	Netherlands U19	7	(0)
2021–2023	Netherlands U20	12	(0)
2022	Indonesia U20	2	(0)
2024	Indonesia U23	5	(0)
2024–	Indonesia	25	(2)
Medal record
Men's football
Representing Indonesia
FIFA ASEAN Cup
Winner	2026 Indonesia	Team
FIFA Series
Runner-up	2026 Indonesia
- * Club domestic league appearances and goals as of 22 November 2026 ‡ National team caps and goals as of 5 October 2026

Justin Quincy Hubner (born 14 September 2003) is a professional footballer who plays as a centre-back or defensive midfielder for Eredivisie club Fortuna Sittard. Born in the Netherlands, he plays for the Indonesia national team.

== Club career ==
=== FC Den Bosch ===
As a youth player, Hubner joined the academy of Dutch second tier side Den Bosch.

=== Wolverhampton Wanderers ===
In February 2020, Hubner joined English side, Wolverhampton Wanderers from Den Bosch, with his new club describing him as a left-sided centre-back who would go into their academy squad. On 1 February 2023, Wolves announced Hubner had signed a new two-and-a-half-year contract keeping him at the club until June 2025.

On 2 December 2023, he was named on the bench for the Premier League match against Arsenal.

He was released by the club on 6 June 2025.

==== Loan to Cerezo Osaka ====
On 12 March 2024, Hubner joined J1 League club Cerezo Osaka on a season-long loan.

On 16 July 2024, Hubner's loan was terminated prematurely by Cerezo, and he returned to Wolves. He made 6 appearances in the J1 league and 2 appearances in the J.League Cup.

=== Fortuna Sittard ===
On 29 July 2025, Fortuna Sittard announced that Hubner has signed with the club on a three-year contract. On 8 August 2025, he made his debut against Go Ahead Eagles, as the match ended in a 2−2 draw.

On 11 January 2026, Hubner scored his first professional goal for Fortuna Sittard in an Eredivisie away match against Go Ahead Eagles. Starting as a left-back, he scored a 93rd-minute equalizer from an Alen Halilović assist to secure a 2–2 draw for his side.

== International career ==
=== Netherlands youth ===
Hubner represented the Netherlands under-19 football team, and on 25 March 2023 he played for the Netherlands under-20 in a friendly against France under-20.

=== Indonesia ===
In October 2022 Hubner was called up to the Indonesia under-20 team. Indonesia manager Shin Tae-yong pointed to the selection of Rafael Struick, Ivar Jenner, and Hubner as foreign based players ahead of the 2023 AFC Asian Cup and Indonesia hosting the 2023 FIFA U-20 World Cup.

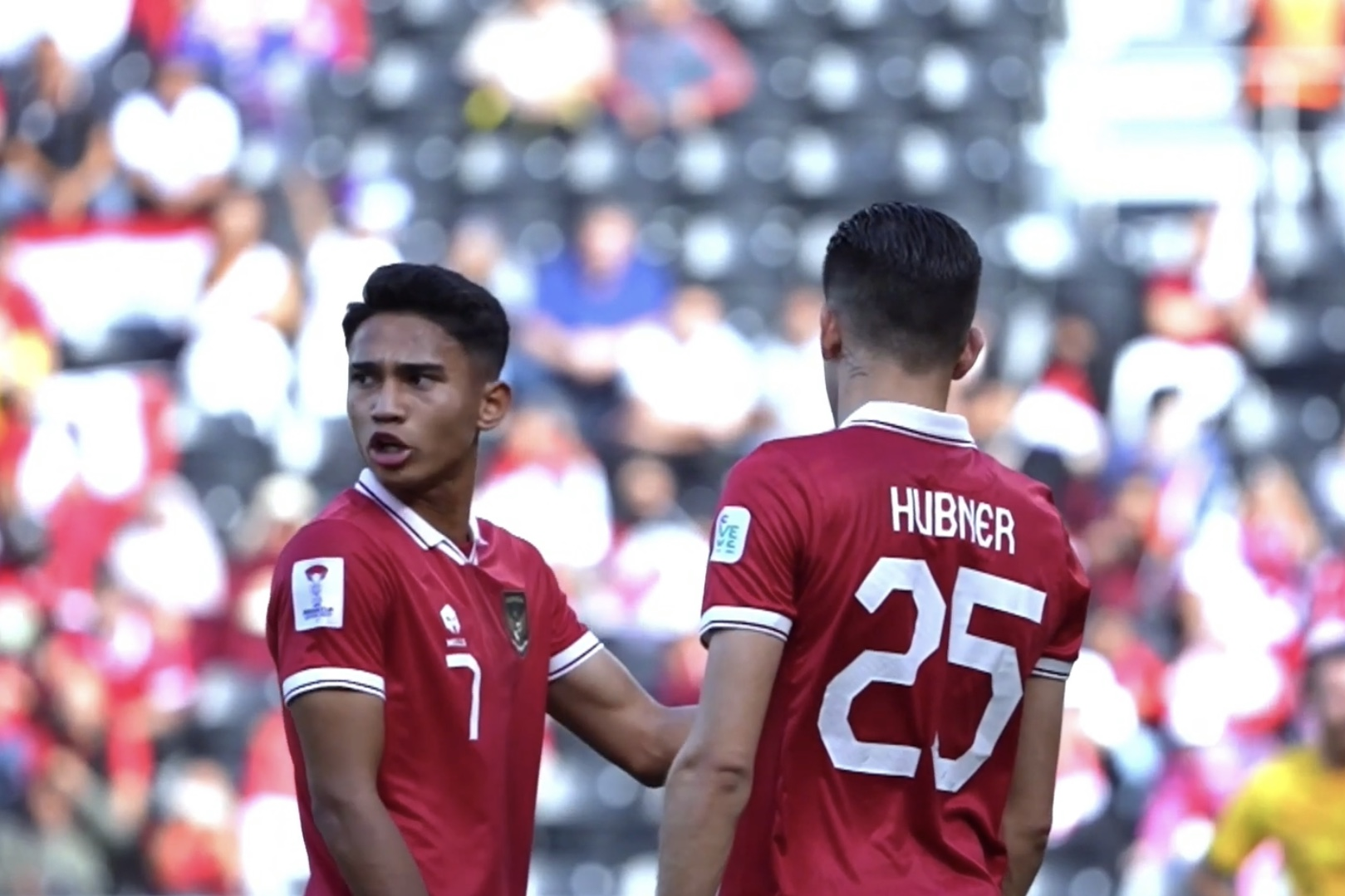
Hubner (right) playing for Indonesia in a match against Australia at the 2023 AFC Asian Cup

Hubner joined the Indonesia squad for a training camp in Turkey in November 2022. He was quoted as saying "I am currently in Turkey to join the Indonesian national team. I am very happy to have the opportunity to play with my friends. I hope to make Indonesia proud." On 17 November, he played for the Indonesia under-20 against France under-20 in a friendly match in Spain. He also played against Slovakia under-20 two days later.

On 2 January 2024, Hubner made his debut for the Indonesia senior team against Libya in a friendly match. On 15 January, Hubner made his competitive debut in the 2023 AFC Asian Cup against Iraq. He helped the team reached their first-ever knockout stage.

In April 2024, Hubner was named in the Indonesia under-23 final squad for the 2024 AFC U-23 Asian Cup held in Qatar. On 18 April, he made his debut for the under-23 team despite having played 90 minutes a day earlier for Cerezo in the J.League Cup.

== Personal life ==
Hubner's father is of Indonesian descent, with family in Makassar, while his mother is Dutch. On 3 November 2023, Erick Thohir, President of PSSI, told the press that Hubner would be naturalized as an Indonesian citizen as soon as possible.

On 6 December 2023, Hubner officially obtained Indonesian citizenship.

On 24 December 2025, Hubner became engaged to Indonesian actress Jennifer Coppen in the Netherlands.

== Career statistics ==
=== Club ===
As of match played 22 November 2026

Appearances and goals by club, season and competition
Club	Season	League			National cup		League cup		Other		Total	
Club	Season	Division	Apps	Goals	Apps	Goals	Apps	Goals	Apps	Goals	Apps	Goals
Wolverhampton Wanderers	2023–24	Premier League	0	0	0	0	0	0	0	0	0	0
Cerezo Osaka (loan)	2024	J1 League	6	0	0	0	2 (Note: Appearances in J. League Cup)	0	0	0	8	0
Fortuna Sittard	2025–26	Eredivisie	25	2	1 (Note: Appearances in KNVB Cup)	0	–		–		26	2
Fortuna Sittard	2026–27	Eredivisie	13	0	1	0	–		–		14	0
Fortuna Sittard	Total		38	2	2	0	0	0	0	0	40	2
Career total			44	2	2	0	2	0	0	0	48	2

=== International ===
As of match played 5 October 2026

Appearances and goals by national team and year
National team	Year	Apps	Goals
Indonesia	2024	15	0
Indonesia	2025	3	0
Indonesia	2026	7	2
Total		25	2

Scores and results list Indonesia's goal tally first, score column indicates score after each Hubner goal.

List of international goals scored by Justin Hubner
No.	Date	Venue	Cap	Opponent	Score	Result	Competition
1	5 June 2026	Gelora Bung Karno Stadium, Jakarta, Indonesia	21	Oman	1–0	3–0	Garuda Championship Series
2	1 October 2026	Gelora Bung Karno Stadium, Jakarta, Indonesia	24	Bangladesh	6–1	9–2	2026 FIFA ASEAN Cup

== Honours ==
Indonesia

- FIFA ASEAN Cup: 2026

Individual

- Wolverhampton Wanderers U-21 Player of the season: 2024–25

== See also ==
- List of Indonesia international footballers born outside Indonesia
