= Leo Kokubo =

Japanese footballer (born 2001)

Leo Kokubo 小久保 玲央
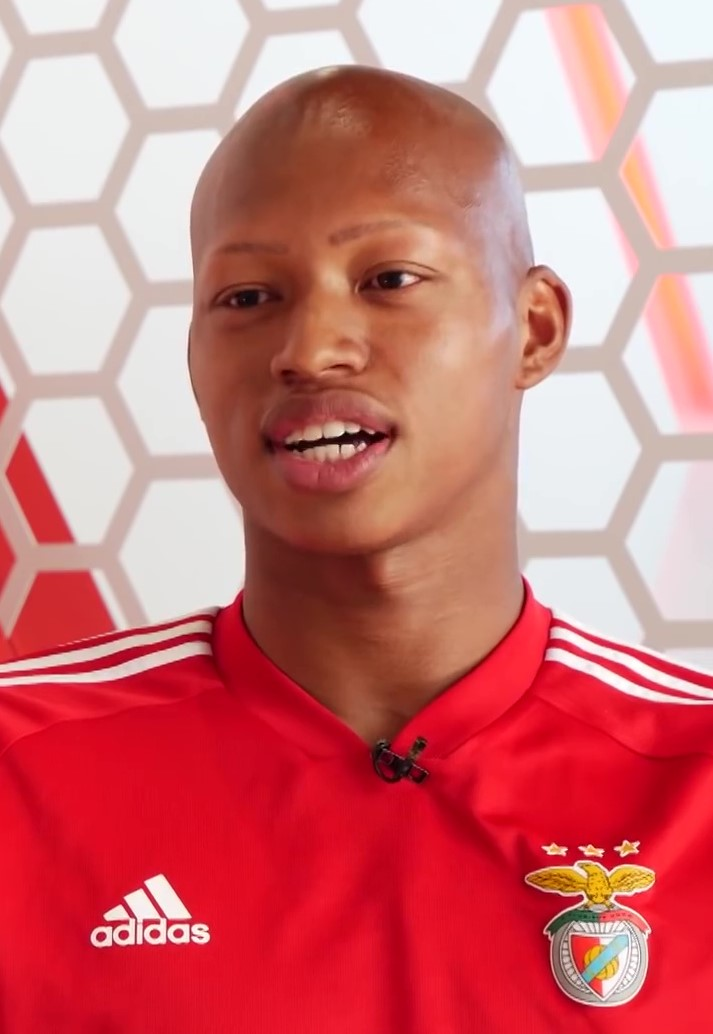
- Kokubo with Benfica in 2020

Personal information
- Full name: Leo Brian Kokubo
- Date of birth: 23 January 2001 (age 25)
- Place of birth: Chiba, Japan
- Height: 1.93 m (6 ft 4 in)
- Position: Goalkeeper

Team information
- Current team: Sint-Truiden
- Number: 16

Youth career
- Kashiwa Effort
- –2019: Kashiwa Reysol
- 2019–2022: Benfica

Senior career*
Years	Team	Apps	(Gls)
2022–2024	Benfica B	25	(0)
2024–	Sint-Truiden	71	(0)

International career^{‡}
2017	Japan U16	1	(0)
2019	Japan U18	1	(0)
2022–2024	Japan U23	14	(0)
2026–	Japan	1	(0)
Medal record
Men's football
Representing Japan
AFC U-23 Asian Cup
Bronze medal – third place	2022 Uzbekistan	Team
Gold medal – first place	2024 Qatar	Team
- * Club domestic league appearances and goals as of 31 May 2026 ‡ National team caps and goals as of 28 September 2026

Leo Brian Kokubo (小久保 玲央 ブライアン, Kokubo Reo Buraian; born 23 January 2001) is a Japanese professional footballer who plays as a goalkeeper for Belgian Pro League team Sint-Truiden and the Japan national team.

== International career ==
Kokubo was born in Japan to a Nigerian father and Japanese mother. He is a youth international for Japan, having represented the Japan U16s, U18s and U23s.

On 4 April 2024, Kokubo was called up to the Japan U23 squad for the 2024 AFC U-23 Asian Cup. In the 2024 AFC U-23 Asian Cup final, he saved a penalty from Umarali Rakhmonaliev during stoppage time, helping Japan secure their 1–0 score against Uzbekistan, winning the competition for the second time in their history. He was consequently named as "Man of the match" for his heroic performance in the final.

== Career statistics ==
As of match played 15 February 2025

Appearances and goals by club, season and competition
Club	Season	League			National cup		Total	
Club	Season	Division	Apps	Goals	Apps	Goals	Apps	Goals
Benfica B	2021–22	Liga Portugal 2	9	0	—		9	0
Benfica B	2022–23	Liga Portugal 2	0	0	—		0	0
Benfica B	2023–24	Liga Portugal 2	16	0	—		16	0
Benfica B	Total		25	0	—		25	0
Sint-Truiden	2024–25	Belgian Pro League	23	0	0	0	23	0
Career total			48	0	0	0	48	0

== Honours ==
Benfica

- Supertaça Cândido de Oliveira: 2023

Japan U23

- AFC U-23 Asian Cup: 2024
