= Bùi Vĩ Hào =

Vietnamese footballer (born 2003)

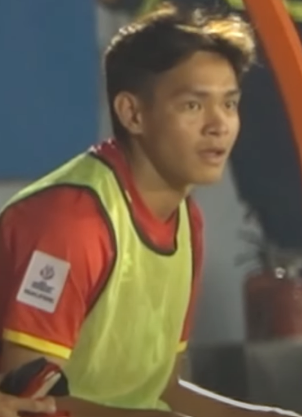
- Vĩ Hào in 2025

Personal information
- Full name: Bùi Vĩ Hào
- Date of birth: 24 February 2003 (age 23)
- Place of birth: Phú Tân, An Giang, Vietnam
- Height: 1.75 m (5 ft 9 in)
- Positions: Winger; forward

Team information
- Current team: Becamex Hồ Chí Minh City
- Number: 11

Youth career
- 2015–2022: An Giang

Senior career*
| Years | Team | Apps | (Gls) |
| 2019 | → Bến Tre (loan) | 3 | (1) |
| 2021 | → PVF (loan) | 0 | (0) |
| 2022– | Becamex Hồ Chí Minh City | 88 | (11) |

International career^{‡}
| 2021–2023 | Vietnam U20 | 6 | (1) |
| 2022–2025 | Vietnam U23 | 18 | (5) |
| 2023– | Vietnam | 12 | (2) |
Medal record
Men's football
Representing Vietnam
AFF U-23 Championship
| Winner | Thailand 2023 |
ASEAN Championship
| Winner | ASEAN 2024 |
- * Club domestic league appearances and goals as of 7 June 2026 ‡ National team caps and goals as of 12 November 2025

Bùi Vĩ Hào (born 24 February 2003) is a Vietnamese professional footballer who plays as a winger or forward for Becamex Hồ Chí Minh City.

== Club career ==
Born in An Giang, Vĩ Hào spent his entire youth career playing for his local team An Giang FC. He played for Bến Tre in the 2019 Vietnamese Third Division and scored one goal. In 2021, he was loaned to PVF to play in the 2021 Vietnamese League Two, but didn't make any appearance after the league was cancelled due to the difficult COVID-19 situation in Vietnam.

In 2022, Vĩ Hào joined V.League 1 side Becamex Bình Dương. He scored his first professional goal on 21 July 2022, scoring Becamex Bình Dương's only goal in their 1–2 V.League 1 defeat against Hoàng Anh Gia Lai.

In the 2023–24 season, Vĩ Hào became an important starter for Becamex Bình Dương, appearing in 25 out of 26 games for the club, and netted a total of 5 goals. This performance lead him to win the V.League 1 Young Player of the Season award.

== International career ==
=== Youth ===
Vĩ Hào was named on coach Hoàng Anh Tuấn's 23-men list for the 2023 AFC U-20 Championship. He appeared in all three group stage games with Vietnam under-20 but didn't score any goals. Vietnam U20 eventually failed to qualify to the knockout stage of the tournament. He later featured in the 2023 AFF U-23 Championship with Vietnam U23. Vĩ Hào scored 1 goal in the tournament Vietnam managed to win the title. A month after, Vĩ Hào scored a 84th-minute header to help Vietnam 1–0 against Yemen in a 2024 AFC U-23 Asian Cup qualification game, thus qualify his team to the final tournament.

In April 2024, Vĩ Hào was named in Vietnam U23's squad for the AFC U-23 Asian Cup. He entried the first game against Kuwait as a substitute and scored a brace to help Vietnam win 3–1. In the second group stage game against Malaysia, Vĩ Hào once again came in as a substitute and won a penalty for his team, contributing the 2–0 win.

=== Senior ===
On 13 October 2023, Vĩ Hào made his international debut with Vietnam national team in the friendly game against Uzbekistan. In January 2024, he featured in Vietnam's 30-men preliminary squad for the 2023 AFC Asian Cup but was not named in the final list.

On 12 October 2024, Vĩ Hào scored his first international goal, opening the score for Vietnam in a 1–1 friendly home draw against India.

== Career statistics ==
=== Club ===
As of match played 7 June 2026

Appearances and goals by club, season and competition
| Club | Season | League | | | Cup | | Other | | Total | |
| Club | Season | Division | Apps | Goals | Apps | Goals | Apps | Goals | Apps | Goals |
|---|---|---|---|---|---|---|---|---|---|---|
| Becamex Hồ Chí Minh City | 2022 | V.League 1 | 20 | 2 | 1 | 0 | — | | 21 | 2 |
| Becamex Hồ Chí Minh City | 2023 | V.League 1 | 18 | 1 | 2 | 0 | — | | 20 | 1 |
| Becamex Hồ Chí Minh City | 2023-24 | V.League 1 | 25 | 5 | 3 | 1 | — | | 28 | 6 |
| Becamex Hồ Chí Minh City | 2024-25 | V.League 1 | 16 | 2 | 2 | 0 | — | | 18 | 2 |
| Becamex Hồ Chí Minh City | 2025-26 | V.League 1 | 9 | 1 | 0 | 0 | — | | 9 | 1 |
| Total career | | | 88 | 11 | 8 | 1 | 0 | 0 | 96 | 12 |

=== International ===
As of match played 2 January 2025

Appearances and goals by national team and year
| National team | Year | Apps | Goals |
|---|---|---|---|
| Vietnam | 2023 | 2 | 0 |
| Vietnam | 2024 | 8 | 2 |
| Vietnam | 2025 | 1 | 0 |
| Total | | 11 | 2 |

Scores and results list Vietnam's goal tally first.

| No. | Date | Venue | Opponent | Score | Result | Competition |
|---|---|---|---|---|---|---|
| 1. | 12 October 2024 | Thiên Trường Stadium, Nam Định, Vietnam | India | 1–0 | 1–1 | Friendly |
| 2. | 21 December 2024 | Việt Trì Stadium, Việt Trì, Vietnam | Myanmar | 1–0 | 5–0 | 2024 ASEAN Championship |

== Honours ==
Vietnam U23

- AFF U-23 Championship: 2023

Vietnam

- ASEAN Championship: 2024

Individual

- Vietnamese National U-21 Football Championship top scorer: 2022
- V.League 1 Young Player of the Season: 2023–24
