= Võ Hoàng Minh Khoa =

Vietnamese footballer

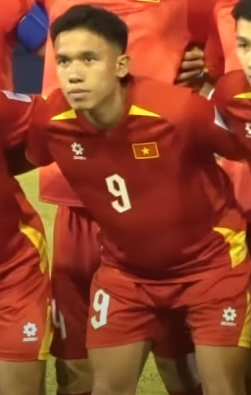
- Minh Khoa in 2025

Personal information
- Full name: Võ Hoàng Minh Khoa
- Date of birth: 12 March 2001 (age 25)
- Place of birth: Tân Uyên, Bình Dương, Vietnam
- Height: 1.76 m (5 ft 9 in)
- Position: Midfielder

Team information
- Current team: Becamex Hồ Chí Minh City
- Number: 10

Youth career
- 2017–2022: Becamex Bình Dương

Senior career*
Years	Team	Apps	(Gls)
2020–	Becamex Hồ Chí Minh City	94	(6)

International career^{‡}
2022–2024	Vietnam U23	17	(1)
2025–	Vietnam	7	(0)
Medal record
Men's football
Representing Vietnam
AFF U-23 Championship
Winner	Thailand 2023
- * Club domestic league appearances and goals as of 21 November 2026 ‡ National team caps and goals as of 17 November 2026

Võ Hoàng Minh Khoa (born 12 March 2001) is a Vietnamese professional footballer who plays as a midfielder for V.League 2 club Becamex Hồ Chí Minh City and the Vietnam national team.

== Club career ==
Born in Bình Dương, Minh Khoa was a member of the Becamex Bình Dương youth academy. He was promoted to the first team in 2020, but suffered from a serious injury that made him unavailable for the entire 2020 season.

In 2022, Minh Khoa made his professional debut with Becamex Bình Dương. In July 2025, he announced his departure from Becamex Bình Dương, but later extended his contract at the beginning of August.

== International career ==
Minh Khoa was called up to the Vietnam U23 for the 2023 Doha Cup. On his debut with Vietnam U23, Minh Khoa was sent off after a dangerous fault against Iraq U23. He later took part in the 2023 AFF U-23 Championship in which Vietnam managed to win the title.

In 2024, Minh Khoa featured in Vietnam U23's squad for the AFC U-23 Asian Cup. He scored a goal in the second group stage game against Malaysia from the penalty spot, helping Vietnam win 2–0.

On 6 March 2025, Minh Khoa was called up to the senior team for the first time to prepare for the 2027 AFC Asian Cup qualification game against Laos.

== Career statistics ==
=== Club ===
As of match played 21 November 2026

Appearances and goals by club, season and competition
Club	Season	League			Cup		Other		Total	
Club	Season	Division	Apps	Goals	Apps	Goals	Apps	Goals	Apps	Goals
Becamex Hồ Chí Minh City
Becamex Hồ Chí Minh City	2020	V.League 1	0	0	0	0	—		0	0
Becamex Hồ Chí Minh City	2021	V.League 1	0	0	0	0	—		0	0
Becamex Hồ Chí Minh City	2022	V.League 1	12	0	1	0	—		13	0
Becamex Hồ Chí Minh City	2023	V.League 1	11	0	3	0	—		14	0
Becamex Hồ Chí Minh City	2023-24	V.League 1	23	2	3	0	—		26	2
Becamex Hồ Chí Minh City	2024-25	V.League 1	24	3	4	1	—		28	4
Becamex Hồ Chí Minh City	2025-26	V.League 1	18	1	0	0	—		21	7
Becamex Hồ Chí Minh City	2026-27	V.League 2	6	0	1	0	—		7	0
Total career			94	6	12	1	0	0	106	7

=== International ===
As of match played 17 November 2026

Appearances and goals by national team and year
National team	Year	Apps	Goals
Vietnam	2025	3	0
Vietnam	2026	4	0
Total		7	0

== Honours ==
Vietnam U23

- AFF U-23 Championship: 2023
