= Fūki Yamada =

Japanese association football player

Fūki Yamada 山田 楓喜
Personal information
- Full name: Fūki Yamada
- Date of birth: 10 July 2001 (age 25)
- Place of birth: Minakuchi, Kōka District, Shiga, Japan
- Height: 1.81 m (5 ft 11 in)
- Position: Winger

Team information
- Current team: FC Tokyo
- Number: 71

Youth career
- –2013: Tsuchiyama SSS
- 2014–2019: Kyoto Sanga

Senior career*
Years	Team	Apps	(Gls)
2020–2025	Kyoto Sanga	43	(3)
2024	→ Tokyo Verdy (loan)	21	(5)
2025	→ Nacional (loan)	13	(1)
2026–	FC Tokyo	10	(1)

International career^{‡}
2016	Japan U15	2	(1)
2022–	Japan U23	18	(2)
Medal record
Men's football
Representing Japan
AFC U-23 Asian Cup
Bronze medal – third place	2022 Uzbekistan	Team
Gold medal – first place	2024 Qatar	Team
- * Club domestic league appearances and goals as of 20:39, 9 April 2026 (UTC) ‡ National team caps and goals as of 17:04, 9 June 2021 (UTC)

Fūki Yamada (山田 楓喜, Yamada Fūki; born 10 July 2001) is a Japanese professional footballer who plays as a winger for J1 League club FC Tokyo.

== Club career ==
Yamada made his professional debut in a 3–1 Emperor's Cup win against FC Imabari.

In January 2025, it was announced that Yamada would be moving on loan to Primeira Liga club Nacional.

== International career ==
On 4 April 2024, Yamada was called up to the Japan U23 squad for the 2024 AFC U-23 Asian Cup. On 3 May 2024, Yamada scored the only goal of the game in the 2024 AFC U-23 Asian Cup final. It was his second goal in the tournament as Japan beat Uzbekistan to win the competition for the second time in their history.

== Career statistics ==
=== Club ===
As of 9 April 2026

Appearances and goals by club, season and competition
Club	Season	League			National cup (Note: Includes Emperors Cup)		League cup (Note: Includes J.League Cup)		Total	
Club	Season	Division	Apps	Goals	Apps	Goals	Apps	Goals	Apps	Goals
Kyoto Sanga	2021	J2 League	0	0	1	0	0	0	1	0
Kyoto Sanga	2022	J1 League	14	2	3	0	6	1	23	3
Kyoto Sanga	2023	J1 League	17	1	1	0	2	1	20	2
Kyoto Sanga	2025	J1 League	12	0	2	0	0	0	14	0
Kyoto Sanga	Total		43	3	7	0	8	2	58	5
Tokyo Verdy (loan)	2024	J1 League	21	5	1	0	1	0	23	5
Nacional (loan)	2024–25	Primeira Liga	13	1	0	0	0	0	13	1
FC Tokyo	2026	J1 (100)	10	1	–		–		10	1
Career total			87	10	8	0	9	2	104	12

== Honours ==
Japan U23

- AFC U-23 Asian Cup: 2024
