= Seiji Kimura =

Japanese footballer (born 2001)

Seiji Kimura 木村 誠二
Personal information
- Date of birth: 24 August 2001 (age 25)
- Place of birth: Chiba, Japan
- Height: 1.86 m (6 ft 1 in)
- Position: Centre back

Team information
- Current team: Westerlo
- Number: 5

Youth career
- 2012: FC Hirata
- 2013: Ichikawa FC
- 2014–2019: FC Tokyo

Senior career*
Years	Team	Apps	(Gls)
2018–2019	FC Tokyo U-23	37	(1)
2020–2025	FC Tokyo	23	(0)
2021	→ Kyoto Sanga (loan)	1	(0)
2021	→ SC Sagamihara (loan)	17	(1)
2022	→ Montedio Yamagata (loan)	6	(0)
2024	→ Sagan Tosu (loan)	26	(1)
2025–	Westerlo	21	(1)

International career^{‡}
2017	Japan U16	1	(0)
2018	Japan U17		
2019	Japan U18	1	(0)
2021	Japan U20		
Medal record
Men's football
Representing Japan
AFC U-23 Asian Cup
Bronze medal – third place	2022 Uzbekistan	Team
Gold medal – first place	2024 Qatar	Team
- * Club domestic league appearances and goals as of 1 June 2026 ‡ National team caps and goals as of 18:22, 19 July 2021

Seiji Kimura (木村 誠二, Kimura Seiji; born 24 August 2001) is a Japanese footballer who plays as a centre back for Belgian Pro League club Westerlo.

== Club career ==
On 8 August 2025, Kimura signed a four-year contract with Westerlo in Belgium.

== International career ==
On 4 April 2024, Kimura was called up to the Japan U23 squad for the 2024 AFC U-23 Asian Cup.

== Career statistics ==
=== Club ===
As of 5 May 2024

Appearances and goals by club, season and competition
Club	Season	League			National Cup		League Cup		Other		Total	
Club	Season	Division	Apps	Goals	Apps	Goals	Apps	Goals	Apps	Goals	Apps	Goals
Japan			League		Emperor's Cup		J.League Cup		Other		Total	
FC Tokyo U-23	2018	J3 League	18	0	–		–		–		18	0
FC Tokyo U-23	2019	J3 League	19	1	–		–		–		19	1
FC Tokyo U-23	Total		37	1	0	0	0	0	0	0	37	1
FC Tokyo	2020	J1 League	3	0	0	0	0	0	–		3	0
FC Tokyo	2022	J1 League	6	0	0	0	0	0	–		6	0
FC Tokyo	2023	J1 League	5	0	1	0	3	0	–		9	0
FC Tokyo	Total		14	0	1	0	3	0	0	0	18	0
Kyoto Sanga (loan)	2021	J2 League	1	0	0	0	–		–		1	0
SC Sagamihara (loan)	2021	J2 League	17	1	0	0	–		–		17	1
Montedio Yamagata (loan)	2022	J2 League	6	0	0	0	–		–		6	0
Sagan Tosu (loan)	2024	J1 League	2	0	0	0	0	0	0	0	2	0
Career total			77	2	1	0	3	0	0	0	81	2

== Honours ==
Japan U23

- AFC U-23 Asian Cup: 2024
