= Mustafa Saadoon (footballer, born 2001) =

Iraqi footballer (born 2001)

Personal information
- Full name: Mustafa Saadoon Abbood Al-Korji
- Date of birth: 25 May 2001 (age 25)
- Place of birth: Corgi, Iraq
- Height: 1.82 m (6 ft 0 in)
- Position: Right back

Team information
- Current team: Zakho
- Number: 17

Youth career
- –2022: RCD Espanyol Academy Baghdad

Senior career*
Years	Team	Apps	(Gls)
2022–2023	Al-Kahrabaa		
2023–2025	Al-Quwa Al-Jawiya		
2025–2026	Al-Shorta	27	(2)
2026–	Zakho	7	(1)

International career^{‡}
2022–2024	Iraq U23	19	(2)
2023–	Iraq	18	(0)
Medal record
Men's football
Representing Iraq
AFC U-23 Asian Cup
Bronze medal – third place	2024 Qatar	Team
- * Club domestic league appearances and goals as of 16 September 2026 ‡ National team caps and goals as of 17 July 2026

Mustafa Saadoon Abbood Al-Korji (Arabic: مصطفى سعدون; born 25 May 2001) is an Iraqi professional footballer who plays as a right back for Iraq Stars League club Zakho and the Iraq national team.

== Club career ==
Born in Corgi, Saadoon spent his youth career at the RCD Espanyol football academy in Baghdad. In 2022, he joined Al-Kahrabaa and played there during one season before joining Iraqi giant Al-Quwa Al-Jawiya in August 2023.

== International career ==
On 13 October 2023, Saadoon made his international debut for Iraq in the team's goalless draw against Qatar, as part of the 2023 Jordan International Tournament.

In April 2024, Saadoon featured in Iraq U23's squad for the 2024 AFC U-23 Asian Cup. In the last group stage match against Saudi Arabia, he won a penalty for his team and later scored himself the winning goal for Iraq as the match ended in a 2–1 win for them, thus qualify Iraq to the quarter-finals as the group winner despite losing their first game. Saadoun continoued to feature for the team as they finished third overall in the tournament and qualified to the 2024 Olympic games

== Career statistics ==
=== International ===
As of matches played 28 March 2024

National team	Year	Apps	Goals
Iraq	2023	3	0
Iraq	2024	0	0
Total		3	0
