= Ivar Jenner =

Indonesian footballer (born 2004)

- Jenner with Indonesia in 2025

Personal information
- Full name: Ivar Jenner
- Date of birth: 10 January 2004 (age 22)
- Place of birth: Utrecht, Netherlands
- Height: 1.87 m (6 ft 2 in)
- Position: Midfielder

Team information
- Current team: Dewa United Banten
- Number: 6

Youth career
- 2010–2014: IJFC
- 2014–2016: Ajax
- 2016–2022: Utrecht

Senior career*
Years	Team	Apps	(Gls)
2022–2026	Jong Utrecht	70	(2)
2025–2026	Utrecht	0	(0)
2026–	Dewa United Banten	22	(0)

International career^{‡}
2019	Netherlands U15	2	(0)
2022	Indonesia U20	2	(0)
2023–2025	Indonesia U23	14	(2)
2023–	Indonesia	33	(0)
Medal record
Men's football
Representing Indonesia
FIFA ASEAN Cup
Winner	2026 Indonesia	Team
FIFA Series
Runner-up	2026 Indonesia
- * Club domestic league appearances and goals as of 31 October 2026 ‡ National team caps and goals as of 15:01, 5 October 2026 (UTC)

Ivar Jenner (born 10 January 2004) is a professional footballer who plays as a midfielder for Super League club Dewa United Banten. Born in the Netherlands, he plays for the Indonesia national team.

== Club career ==
Jenner played for IJsselstein-based academy side IJFC and Ajax before a move to Utrecht in 2016. He signed his first professional contract in May 2021.

Jenner signed a new three-year deal with Utrecht in August 2023. After three years at Jong Utrecht, he joined Utrecht senior team for 2025–26 season. On 2 February 2026, Jenner's contract with Utrecht was mutually terminated.

== International career ==
Jenner has represented the Netherlands at under-15 level.

He is also eligible to represent Indonesia, and in October 2022, he travelled with fellow Dutch-Indonesian footballer Justin Hubner to Indonesia to become naturalized, in order to represent the Indonesia national under-20 football team at the 2023 AFC Asian Cup and the 2023 FIFA U-20 World Cup.

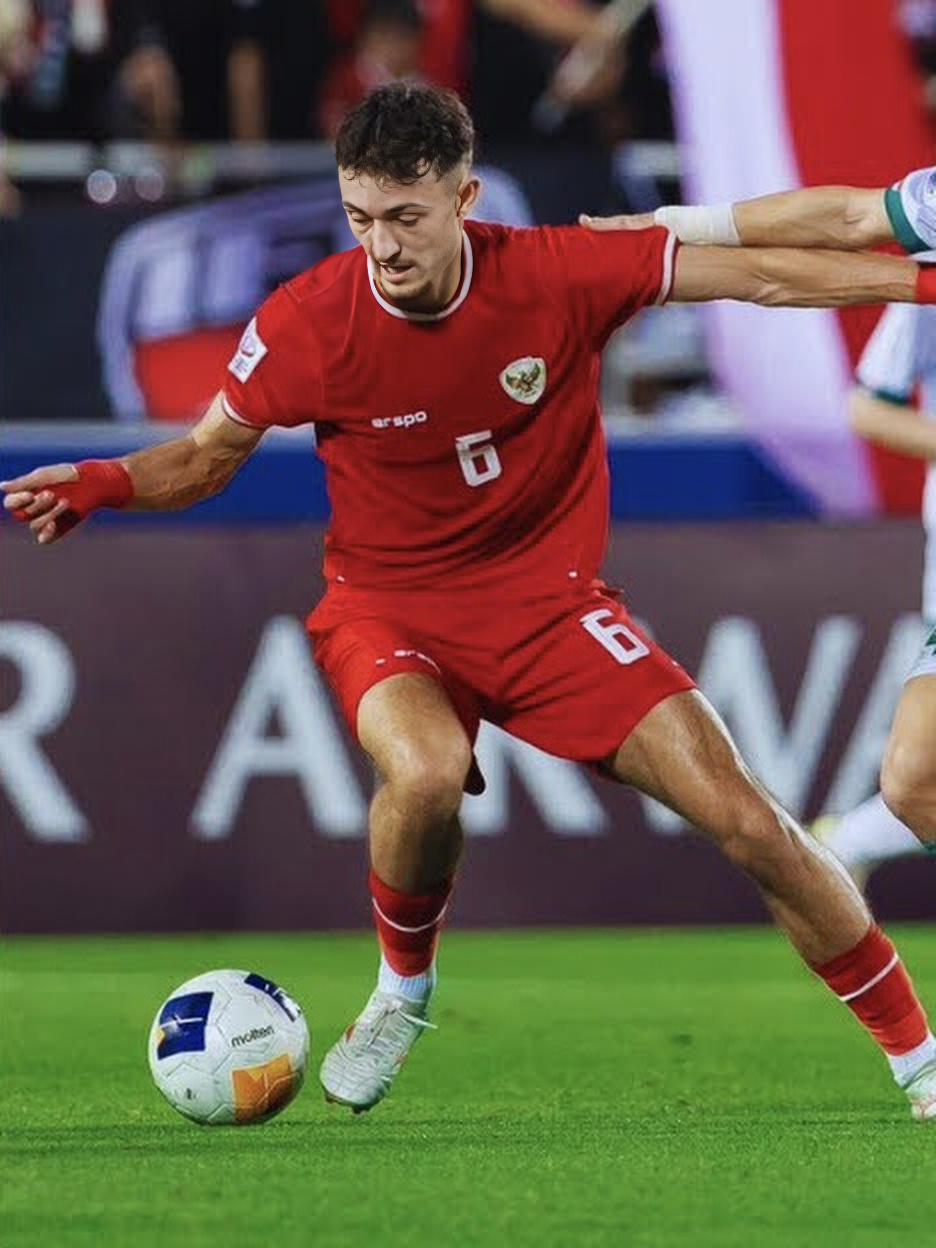
Jenner playing for Indonesia U23 at the 2024 AFC U-23 Asian Cup

Although Jenner still holds the Netherlands passport, on 17 November 2022, he played for the Indonesia U-20 in a losing effort, 0–6 against France U-20 in a friendly match in Spain. He also played against Slovakia U-20 two days later, in a 1–2 loss.

On 27 May 2023, Jenner received a called up for the senior team for the friendly matches against Palestine and Argentina. Ivar made his debut on June 14, 2023, against Palestine in a 0–0 draw. On June 19, 2023, Ivar made his first start for the senior team, in just his second appearance for them against Argentina in a 0–2 loss.

On 29 August, Jenner received a call up to the under-23 team for the 2024 AFC U-23 Asian Cup qualification. He made his debut for the under-23 team against Chinese Taipei, in a 9–0 win. He would score his first international goal against Turkmenistan a few days later.

Jenner was named in the final squad for the 2023 AFC Asian Cup tournament. He played in all matches and helped the national team reached its first ever knockout stage.

== Personal life ==
Born in the Netherlands, Jenner is of Indonesian descent.

On 22 May 2023, Jenner officially obtained Indonesian citizenship.

== Career statistics ==
=== Club ===
As of 5 September 2026

Appearances and goals by club, season and competition
Club	Season	League			Cup		Other		Total	
Club	Season	Division	Apps	Goals	Apps	Goals	Apps	Goals	Apps	Goals
Jong Utrecht	2021–22	Eerste Divisie	5	0	–		0	0	5	0
Jong Utrecht	2022–23	Eerste Divisie	13	0	–		0	0	13	0
Jong Utrecht	2023–24	Eerste Divisie	11	0	–		0	0	11	0
Jong Utrecht	2024–25	Eerste Divisie	26	0	–		0	0	26	0
Jong Utrecht	2025–26	Eerste Divisie	14	1	–		0	0	14	1
Jong Utrecht	Total		69	1	0	0	0	0	69	1
Dewa United Banten	2025–26	Super League	14	0	–		1 (Note: Appearances in AFC Challenge League)	0	15	0
Dewa United Banten	2026–27	Super League	1	0	0	0	–		1	0
Dewa United Banten	Total		15	0	0	0	1	0	16	0
Career total			84	1	0	0	1	0	85	1

=== International ===
As of match played 5 October 2026

Appearances and goals by national team and year
National team	Year	Apps	Goals
Indonesia	2023	2	0
Indonesia	2024	16	0
Indonesia	2025	3	0
Indonesia	2026	12	0
Total		33	0

International under-23 goals

Goal	Date	Venue	Opponent	Score	Result	Competition
1.	12 September 2023	Manahan Stadium, Surakarta, Indonesia	Turkmenistan	1–0	2–0	2024 AFC U-23 Asian Cup qualification
2.	2 May 2024	Abdullah bin Khalifa Stadium, Doha, Qatar	Iraq	1–0	1–2 (a.e.t.)	2024 AFC U-23 Asian Cup

== Honours ==
Indonesia

- FIFA ASEAN Cup: 2026
- FIFA Series runner-up: 2026

== See also ==
- List of Indonesia international footballers born outside Indonesia
