= Alibek Davronov =

Uzbekistani footballer

Personal information
- Full name: Alibek Faxriddin oʻgʻli Davronov
- Date of birth: December 28, 2002 (age 23)
- Place of birth: Qarshi, Uzbekistan
- Height: 1.83 m (6 ft 0 in)
- Position: Defender

Team information
- Current team: Nasaf
- Number: 2

Youth career
- Nasaf

Senior career*
Years	Team	Apps	(Gls)
2021–	Nasaf	84	(7)

International career^{‡}
2019	Uzbekistan U19	3	(0)
2022–	Uzbekistan U23	11	(1)
2022–	Uzbekistan	2	(0)
Medal record
Men's football
Representing Uzbekistan
CAFA Nations Cup
Winner	2025 Tajikistan–Uzbekistan	Team
Asian Games
Bronze medal – third place	2022 Hangzhou	Team
AFC U-23 Asian Cup
Silver medal – second place	2024 Qatar	Team
- * Club domestic league appearances and goals as of 29 July 2026 ‡ National team caps and goals as of 17 June 2023 (UTC)

Alibek Davronov (born 28 December 2002) is an Uzbek professional footballer who plays for Nasaf and the Uzbekistan national team.

== Career ==
=== International ===
Davronov made his debut for the Uzbekistan main team on 20 November 2022 in a Friendly match against Russia.

Uzbekistan national team
Year	Apps	Goals
2022	1	0
2023	1	0
Total	2	0

Statistics accurate as of match played 17 June 2023.
