= Alisher Odilov =

Uzbekistani footballer

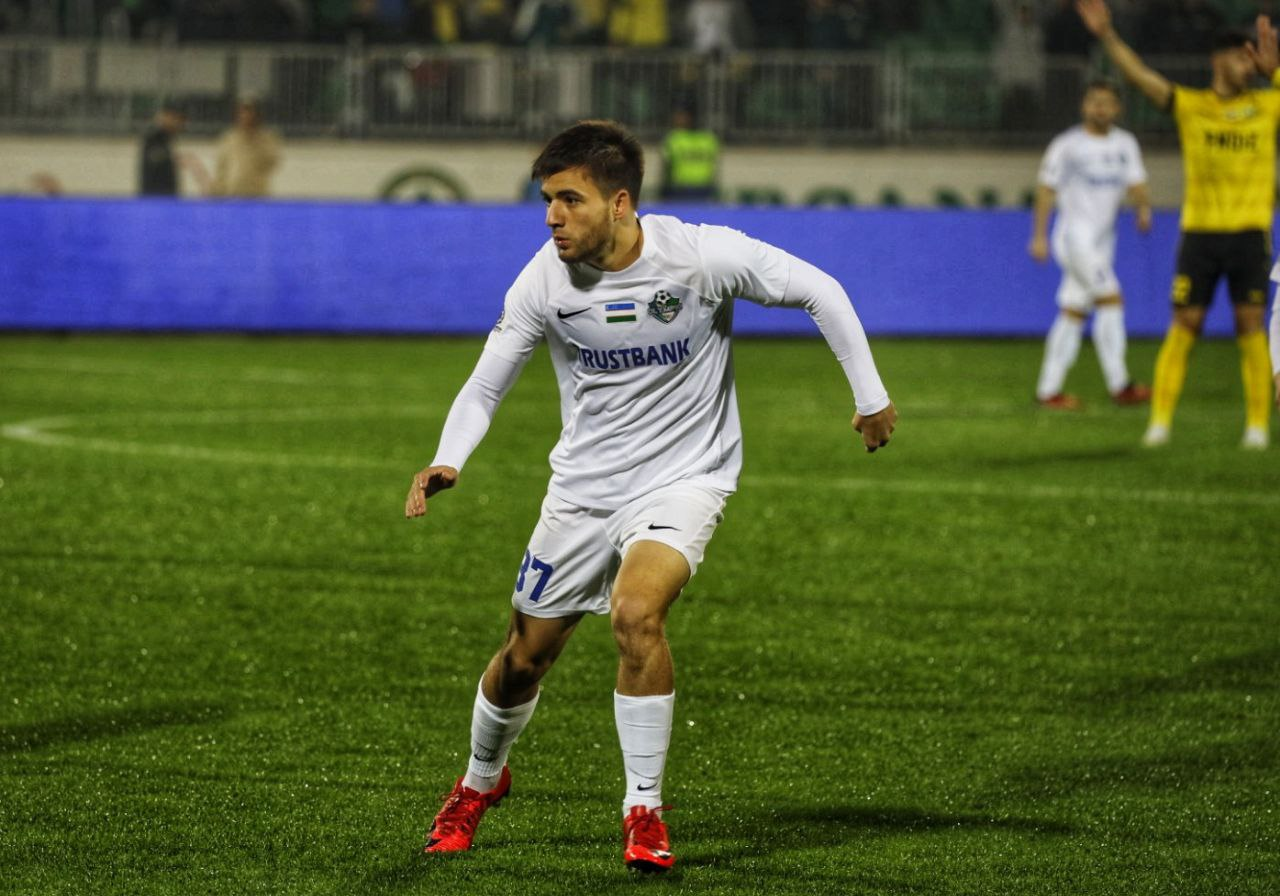

Personal information
- Full name: Alisher Valijon oʻgʻli Odilov
- Date of birth: 15 July 2001 (age 25)
- Place of birth: Oltinkoʻl District, Andijan Region, Uzbekistan
- Height: 1.73 m (5 ft 8 in)
- Position: Forward

Team information
- Current team: Neftchi
- Number: 22

Youth career
- Pakhtakor

Senior career*
Years	Team	Apps	(Gls)
2020–2021	Pakhtakor	0	(0)
2021	→ Olympic (loan)	19	(10)
2021–2024	Olympic	59	(11)
2024–2025	Khimki	0	(0)
2025	Navbahor	15	(2)
2025–	Neftchi	27	(6)

International career^{‡}
2018–2020	Uzbekistan U20	3	(0)
2021–2024	Uzbekistan U23	35	(15)
2025–	Uzbekistan	3	(1)
Medal record
Representing Uzbekistan
Men's football
AFC U-23 Asian Cup
Silver medal – second place	2022 Uzbekistan	Team
Silver medal – second place	2024 Qatar	Team
Asian Games
Bronze medal – third place	2022 Hangzhou	Team
- * Club domestic league appearances and goals as of 20:20, 28 July 2026 (UTC) ‡ National team caps and goals as of 30 March 2026

Alisher Valijon oʻgʻli Odilov (born 15 July 2001) is an Uzbekistani footballer who plays for Neftchi and the Uzbekistan national team.

== Club career ==
On 26 August 2024, Odilov signed with Russian Premier League club Khimki. On 14 January 2025, he left Khimki by mutual consent, after making three bench appearances for the club. In July 2025, he left Navbahor and signed a contract with the Fergana club Neftchi.

== International career ==
Odilov made his international debut for Uzbekistan in a friendly 2–1 defeat to Turkmenistan on 2 September 2025.

He scored his first international goal on 27 March 2026 against Gabon at the Bunyodkor Stadium during the FIFA Series.

== Career statistics ==
=== International ===
As of match played 30 March 2026

Appearances and goals by national team and year
National team	Year	Apps	Goals
Uzbekistan	2025	1	0
Uzbekistan	2026	2	1
Total		3	1

Scores and results list Uzbekistan's goal tally first, score column indicates score after each Odilov goal.

List of international goals scored by Alisher Odilov
No.	Date	Venue	Opponent	Score	Result	Competition
1	27 March 2026	Milliy Stadium, Tashkent, Uzbekistan	Gabon	3–1	3–1	2026 FIFA Series
