= 2024 AFC U-23 Asian Cup =

كأس آسيا تحت 23 سنة 2024

Tournament details
- Host country: Qatar
- Dates: 15 April – 3 May 2024
- Teams: 16 (from 1 confederation)
- Venues: 4 (in 3 host cities)

Final positions
- Champions: Japan (2nd title)
- Runners-up: Uzbekistan
- Third place: Iraq
- Fourth place: Indonesia

Tournament statistics
- Matches played: 32
- Goals scored: 91 (2.84 per match)
- Attendance: 136,534 (4,267 per match)
- Top scorer(s): (Iraq) Ali Jasim (4 goals)
- Best player: (Japan) Joel Chima Fujita
- Best goalkeeper: (Uzbekistan) Abduvohid Nematov
- Fair play award: Uzbekistan

The 2024 AFC U-23 Asian Cup was the 6th edition of the AFC U-23 Asian Cup (previously the AFC U-23 Championship before rebranding from 2021), the biennial international age-restricted football championship organised by the Asian Football Confederation (AFC) for the men's under-23 national teams of Asia. The tournament was held in Qatar from 15 April to 3 May 2024.

The tournament acted as the AFC qualifiers for the 2024 Summer Olympics men's football tournament in France. The top three teams of the tournament qualified for the Olympics as the AFC representatives, while the fourth-best team entered a single-elimination AFC–CAF play-off match. A total of 16 teams competed in the tournament.

Saudi Arabia were the defending champions, but failed to defend the title after losing to Uzbekistan in the quarter-finals, who in turn lost the final to Japan in both teams' hunt for the second title.

== Host selection ==
Qatar was selected as the host for this competition by the Asian Football Confederation Competitions Committee on 30 September 2022. This marked the second time that Qatar was hosting this competition, the first was in 2016.

== Qualification ==
Qualification matches were played between 6 and 12 September 2023.

=== Qualified teams ===
Team	Qualified as	Last appearance	Appearance	Previous best performance
Qatar	Hosts	2022	5th	Third place (2018)
Jordan	Group A winners	2022	6th	Third place (2013)
South Korea	Group B winners	2022	6th	Champions (2020)
Vietnam	Group C winners	2022	5th	Runners-up (2018)
Japan	Group D winners	2022	6th	Champions (2016)
Uzbekistan	Group E winners	2022	6th	Champions (2018)
Iraq	Group F winners	2022	6th	Champions (2013)
United Arab Emirates	Group G winners	2022	5th	Quarter-finals (2013, 2016, 2020)
Thailand	Group H winners	2022	5th	Quarter-finals (2020)
Australia	Group I winners	2022	6th	Third place (2020)
Saudi Arabia	Group J winners	2022	6th	Champions (2022)
Indonesia	Group K winners	—N/a	1st	Debut
Kuwait	Best runners-up	2022	3rd	Group stage (2013, 2022)
Tajikistan	2nd Best runners-up	2022	2nd	Group stage (2022)
China	3rd Best runners-up	2020	5th	Group stage (2013, 2016, 2018, 2020)
Malaysia	4th Best runners-up	2022	3rd	Quarter-finals (2018)

== Venues ==
Four stadiums were used, they were also used in the previous 2023 AFC Asian Cup in January and February 2024.

Al Rayyan (Doha Area)		Location of the host cities of the 2024 AFC U-23 Asian Cup.
Jassim bin Hamad Stadium	Khalifa International Stadium	Location of the host cities of the 2024 AFC U-23 Asian Cup.
Capacity: 15,000	Capacity: 45,857	Location of the host cities of the 2024 AFC U-23 Asian Cup.
Doha	Al Wakrah	Location of the host cities of the 2024 AFC U-23 Asian Cup.
Abdullah bin Khalifa Stadium	Al Janoub Stadium	Location of the host cities of the 2024 AFC U-23 Asian Cup.
Capacity: 12,000	Capacity: 44,325	Location of the host cities of the 2024 AFC U-23 Asian Cup.

== Draw ==
The draw took place at the Wyndham Doha West Bay in Doha, Qatar on 23 November 2023 at 12:00 AST (UTC+3).

The 16 teams were placed into four groups of four teams, with seeding based on their performance at the 2022 AFC U-23 Asian Cup. As hosts, Qatar were ranked as the top seeded team.

Pot 1	Pot 2	Pot 3	Pot 4
1. Qatar (hosts); 2. Saudi Arabia; 3. Uzbekistan; 4. Japan	5. Australia; 6. Iraq; 7. Vietnam; 8. South Korea	9. Thailand; 10. Jordan; 11. United Arab Emirates; 12. Kuwait	13. Malaysia; 14. Tajikistan; 15. Indonesia; 16. China

== Match officials ==
The following referees and assistant referees were appointed for the tournament. Video assistant referees were used in this tournament.

Referees

- (Australia) Shaun Evans
- (Australia) Kate Jacewicz
- (Australia) Alex King
- (Australia) Casey Reibelt
- (China) Shen Yinhao
- (Iran) Mooud Bonyadifard
- (Japan) Hiroyuki Kimura
- (Jordan) Ahmed Faisal Al-Ali
- (South Korea) Kim Woo-sung
- (South Korea) Ko Hyung-jin
- (Kuwait) Abdullah Al-Kandari
- (Kuwait) Ammar Ashkanani
- (Lebanon) Hussein Abo Yehia
- (Qatar) Abdulla Al-Marri
- (Qatar) Meshari Al-Shamari
- (Qatar) Mohammed Al-Shammari
- (Saudi Arabia) Majed Al-Shamrani
- (Saudi Arabia) Abdullah Al-Shehri
- (Syria) Hanna Hattab
- (Tajikistan) Sadullo Gulmurodi
- (Tajikistan) Nasrullo Kabirov
- (Thailand) Sivakorn Pu-Udom
- (Thailand) Torphong Somsing
- (United Arab Emirates) Yahya Al-Mulla
- (United Arab Emirates) Ahmed Eisa Darwish
- (United Arab Emirates) Mohammed Obaid Mohammed
- (Uzbekistan) Rustam Lutfullin
- (Uzbekistan) Firdavs Norsafarov

Assistant referees

- (Australia) Joanna Charaktis
- (Australia) George Lakrindis
- (China) Guo Jingtao
- (China) Luo Zheng
- (Iran) Saeid Ghasemi
- (Iran) Alireza Ildorom
- (Japan) Takeshi Asada
- (Japan) Kota Watanabe
- (Jordan) Ahmad Muhsen
- (Jordan) Ayman Obeidat
- (South Korea) Bang Gi-yeol
- (Kuwait) Ali Jraq
- (Kyrgyzstan) Ramina Tsoi
- (Lebanon) Ali Fakih
- (Qatar) Faisal Al-Shammari
- (Qatar) Zahy Al-Shammari
- (Saudi Arabia) Omar Al-Jamal
- (Saudi Arabia) Hesham Al-Refaei
- (Singapore) Abdul Hannan Bin Abdul Hasim
- (Syria) Mohamad Kazzaz
- (Tajikistan) Vafo Karaev
- (Tajikistan) Hasan Karimov
- (Thailand) Rawut Nakarit
- (United Arab Emirates) Yaser Al-Murshidi
- (Uzbekistan) Sanjar Shayusupov
- (Uzbekistan) Alisher Usmanov

== Squads ==
Players born on or after 1 January 2001 were eligible to compete in the tournament. Each team registered a squad of 18 to 23 players, including a minimum of three goalkeepers (Regulations Article 26.3).

== Group stage ==
Tiebreakers

Teams were ranked according to points (3 points for a win, 1 point for a draw, 0 points for a loss), and if tied on points, the following tiebreaking criteria were applied, in the order given, to determine the rankings (Regulations Article 7.3):

1. Points in head-to-head matches among tied teams;
2. Goal difference in head-to-head matches among tied teams;
3. Goals scored in head-to-head matches among tied teams;
4. If more than two teams were tied, and after applying all head-to-head criteria above, a subset of teams were still tied, all head-to-head criteria above were reapplied exclusively to this subset of teams;
5. Goal difference in all group matches;
6. Goals scored in all group matches;
7. Penalty shoot-out if only two teams were tied and they met in the last round of the group;
8. Disciplinary points (yellow card = 1 point, red card as a result of two yellow cards = 3 points, direct red card = 3 points, yellow card followed by direct red card = 4 points);
9. Drawing of lots.

All times were local, AST (UTC+3).

=== Group A ===
Pos	Team	Pld	W	D	L	GF	GA	GD	Pts	Qualification
1	Qatar (H)	3	2	1	0	4	1	+3	7	Knockout stage
2	Indonesia	3	2	0	1	5	3	+2	6	Knockout stage
3	Australia	3	0	2	1	0	1	−1	2	
4	Jordan	3	0	1	2	2	6	−4	1	

Source: AFC
(H) Hosts
15 April 2024
16:00

Australia	0–0	Jordan
	Report

Abdullah bin Khalifa Stadium, Doha
Attendance: 1,356
Referee: Hiroyuki Kimura (Japan)
15 April 2024
18:30

Qatar	2–0	Indonesia
Sabah 45+1' (pen.); Al-Rawi 54'	Report

Jassim bin Hamad Stadium, Al Rayyan
Attendance: 8,867
Referee: Nasrullo Kabirov (Tajikistan)

18 April 2024
16:00

Indonesia	1–0	Australia
Komang 45'	Report

Abdullah bin Khalifa Stadium, Doha
Attendance: 2,925
Referee: Majed Al-Shamrani (Saudi Arabia)
18 April 2024
18:30

Jordan	1–2	Qatar
Al-Haj 52' (pen.)	Report	Al-Yazidi 40'; Al-Manai 90+14'

Jassim bin Hamad Stadium, Al Rayyan
Attendance: 8,132
Referee: Sivakorn Pu-udom (Thailand)

21 April 2024
18:30

Qatar	0–0	Australia
	Report

Jassim bin Hamad Stadium, Al Rayyan
Attendance: 6,412
Referee: Rustam Lutfullin (Uzbekistan)
21 April 2024
18:30

Jordan	1–4	Indonesia
Hubner 79' (o.g.)	Report	Marselino 23' (pen.), 70'; Witan 40'; Komang 86'

Abdullah bin Khalifa Stadium, Doha
Attendance: 5,632
Referee: Ammar Ashkanani (Kuwait)

=== Group B ===
Pos	Team	Pld	W	D	L	GF	GA	GD	Pts	Qualification
1	South Korea	3	3	0	0	4	0	+4	9	Knockout stage
2	Japan	3	2	0	1	3	1	+2	6	Knockout stage
3	China	3	1	0	2	2	4	−2	3	
4	United Arab Emirates	3	0	0	3	1	5	−4	0	

Source: AFC
16 April 2024
16:00

Japan	1–0	China
Matsuki 8'	Report

Jassim bin Hamad Stadium, Al Rayyan
Attendance: 390
Referee: Casey Reibelt (Australia)
16 April 2024
18:30

South Korea	1–0	United Arab Emirates
Lee Young-jun 90+4'	Report

Abdullah bin Khalifa Stadium, Doha
Attendance: 378
Referee: Rustam Lutfullin (Uzbekistan)

19 April 2024
16:00

China	0–2	South Korea
	Report	Lee Young-jun 34', 69'

Abdullah bin Khalifa Stadium, Doha
Attendance: 1,398
Referee: Mohammed Al-Shammari (Qatar)
19 April 2024
18:30

United Arab Emirates	0–2	Japan
	Report	Kimura 27'; Kawasaki 66'

Jassim bin Hamad Stadium, Al Rayyan
Attendance: 2,097
Referee: Sadullo Gulmurodi (Tajikistan)

22 April 2024
16:00

United Arab Emirates	1–2	China
Fawzi 48'	Report	Xie Wenneng 24'; Liu Zhurun 45+5'

Abdullah bin Khalifa Stadium, Doha
Attendance: 2,411
Referee: Hussein Abo Yehia (Lebanon)
22 April 2024
16:00

Japan	0–1	South Korea
	Report	Kim Min-woo 75'

Jassim bin Hamad Stadium, Al Rayyan
Attendance: 2,683
Referee: Majed Al-Shamrani (Saudi Arabia)

=== Group C ===
Pos	Team	Pld	W	D	L	GF	GA	GD	Pts	Qualification
1	Iraq	3	2	0	1	6	5	+1	6 (Note: Head-to-head points: Iraq 3, Saudi Arabia 0.)	Knockout stage
2	Saudi Arabia	3	2	0	1	10	4	+6	6	Knockout stage
3	Tajikistan	3	1	0	2	5	8	−3	3 (Note: Head-to-head points: Tajikistan 3, Thailand 0.)	
4	Thailand	3	1	0	2	2	6	−4	3	

Source: AFC
Notes:
16 April 2024
18:30

Iraq	0–2	Thailand
	Report	Waris 26'; Teerasak 65'

Al Janoub Stadium, Al Wakrah
Attendance: 854
Referee: Ahmed Eisa Darwish (United Arab Emirates)
16 April 2024
21:00

Saudi Arabia	4–2	Tajikistan
Hamidou 17'; Asiri 45+8'; Yahya 55', 61'	Report	Khayloev 23'; Soirov 64'

Khalifa International Stadium, Al Rayyan
Attendance: 534
Referee: Ko Hyung-jin (South Korea)

19 April 2024
18:30

Thailand	0–5	Saudi Arabia
	Report	Yahya 4'; A. Al-Ghamdi 45+1'; Radif 45+7', 48', 73'

Khalifa International Stadium, Al Rayyan
Attendance: 4,273
Referee: Shen Yinhao (China)
19 April 2024
21:00

Tajikistan	2–4	Iraq
Soirov 45+9' (pen.); Madaminov 90+5'	Report	Muntadher 14'; Jasim 22' (pen.); Khalid 56'; Saad 87'

Al Janoub Stadium, Al Wakrah
Attendance: 4,273
Referee: Shaun Evans (Australia)

22 April 2024
18:30

Thailand	0–1	Tajikistan
	Report	Safarov 90+1'

Al Janoub Stadium, Al Wakrah
Attendance: 1,498
Referee: Yahya Al-Mulla (United Arab Emirates)
22 April 2024
18:30

Saudi Arabia	1–2	Iraq
A. Al-Ghamdi 45+10' (pen.)	Report	Jasim 45+1' (pen.); Saadoon 63'

Khalifa International Stadium, Al Rayyan
Attendance: 4,662
Referee: Hiroyuki Kimura (Japan)

=== Group D ===
Pos	Team	Pld	W	D	L	GF	GA	GD	Pts	Qualification
1	Uzbekistan	3	3	0	0	10	0	+10	9	Knockout stage
2	Vietnam	3	2	0	1	5	4	+1	6	Knockout stage
3	Kuwait	3	1	0	2	3	9	−6	3	
4	Malaysia	3	0	0	3	1	6	−5	0	

Source: AFC
17 April 2024
16:00

Uzbekistan	2–0	Malaysia
Jaloliddinov 11' (pen.); Khoshimov 83'	Report

Khalifa International Stadium, Al Rayyan
Attendance: 3,113
Referee: Ahmed Faisal Al-Ali (Jordan)
17 April 2024
18:30

Vietnam	3–1	Kuwait
Nguyễn Văn Tùng 45+1'; Bùi Vĩ Hào 47', 76'	Report	Al-Awadi 45+9' (pen.)

Al Janoub Stadium, Al Wakrah
Attendance: 394
Referee: Abdulla Al-Marri (Qatar)

20 April 2024
16:00

Malaysia	0–2	Vietnam
	Report	Khuất Văn Khang 39'; Võ Hoàng Minh Khoa 60' (pen.)

Khalifa International Stadium, Al Rayyan
Attendance: 2,456
Referee: Mooud Bonyadifard (Iran)
20 April 2024
18:30

Kuwait	0–5	Uzbekistan
	Report	Davronov 32'; Khamraliev 49'; Erkinov 55'; Kholmatov 86' (pen.); Norchaev 90+6'

Al Janoub Stadium, Al Wakrah
Attendance: 3,113
Referee: Hanna Hattab (Syria)

23 April 2024
18:30

Kuwait	2–1	Malaysia
Al-Awadi 45+14' (pen.); Al-Qaisi 60'	Report	Haqimi 63'

Al Janoub Stadium, Al Wakrah
Attendance: 3,064
Referee: Alex King (Australia)
23 April 2024
18:30

Uzbekistan	3–0	Vietnam
Odilov 4', 40'; Jiyanov 36'	Report

Khalifa International Stadium, Al Rayyan
Attendance: 2,817
Referee: Kim Woo-sung (South Korea)

== Knockout stage ==
In the knockout stage, extra time and penalty shoot-out were used to decide the winner if necessary.

=== Bracket ===
Quarter-finals
25 April – Al Rayyan (JBHS)
Qatar	2
Japan (a.e.t.)	4
26 April – Al Wakrah
Iraq	1
Vietnam	0
25 April – Doha
South Korea	2 (10)
Indonesia (p)	2 (11)
26 April – Al Rayyan (KIS)
Uzbekistan	2
Saudi Arabia	0

Semi-finals
29 April – Al Rayyan (JBHS)
Japan	2
Iraq	0
29 April – Doha
Indonesia	0
Uzbekistan	2

Final
3 May – Al Rayyan (JBHS)
Japan	1
Uzbekistan	0
Third place play-off
2 May – Doha
Iraq (a.e.t.)	2
Indonesia	1

=== Quarter-finals ===
25 April 2024
17:00

Qatar	2–4 (a.e.t.)	Japan
Al-Rawi 24'; Gaber 49'	Report	Yamada 2'; Kimura 67'; Hosoya 101'; K. Uchino 113'

Jassim bin Hamad Stadium, Al Rayyan
Attendance: 9,573
Referee: Hanna Hattab (Syria)

25 April 2024
20:30

South Korea	2–2 (a.e.t.)	Indonesia
Komang 45' (o.g.); Jeong Sang-bin 84'	Report	Struick 15', 45+3'
Penalties
Kim Min-woo (penalty scored); Lee Kang-hee (penalty scored); Hwang Jae-won (penalty scored); Paik Sang-hoon (penalty scored); Byeon Jun-soo (penalty scored); Kang Sang-yoon (penalty missed); Jeong Sang-bin (penalty scored); Hong Yun-sang (penalty scored); Cho Hyun-taek (penalty scored); Baek Jong-bum (penalty scored); Kim Min-woo (penalty scored); Lee Kang-hee (penalty missed)	10–11	(penalty scored) Sananta; (penalty scored) Arhan; (penalty scored) Struick; (penalty scored) Marselino; (penalty scored) Hubner; (penalty missed) Arkhan; (penalty scored) Sroyer; (penalty scored) Ridho; (penalty scored) Ferarri; (penalty scored) Ernando; (penalty scored) Sananta; (penalty scored) Arhan

Abdullah bin Khalifa Stadium, Doha
Attendance: 9,105
Referee: Shaun Evans (Australia)

26 April 2024
17:00

Uzbekistan	2–0	Saudi Arabia
Norchaev 45+2'; Rakhmonaliev 84'	Report

Khalifa International Stadium, Al Rayyan
Attendance: 5,379
Referee: Ahmed Faisal Al-Ali (Jordan)

26 April 2024
20:30

Iraq	1–0	Vietnam
Jasim 64' (pen.)	Report

Al Janoub Stadium, Al Wakrah
Attendance: 3,182
Referee: Ko Hyung-jin (South Korea)

=== Semi-finals ===
Winners qualified for the 2024 Summer Olympics.

29 April 2024
17:00

Indonesia	0–2	Uzbekistan
	Report	Norchaev 68'; Arhan 86' (o.g.)

Abdullah bin Khalifa Stadium, Doha
Attendance: 8,792
Referee: Shen Yinhao (China)

29 April 2024
20:30

Japan	2–0	Iraq
Hosoya 28'; Araki 42'	Report

Jassim bin Hamad Stadium, Al Rayyan
Attendance: 6,405
Referee: Shaun Evans (Australia)

=== Third place play-off ===
The winner qualified for the 2024 Summer Olympics. The loser advanced to the AFC–CAF play-off match against Guinea.

2 May 2024
18:30

Iraq	2–1 (a.e.t.)	Indonesia
Tahseen 27'; Jasim 96'	Report	Jenner 19'

Abdullah bin Khalifa Stadium, Doha
Attendance: 8,090
Referee: Majed Al-Shamrani (Saudi Arabia)

=== Final ===
3 May 2024
18:30

Japan	1–0	Uzbekistan
Yamada 90+1'	Report

Jassim bin Hamad Stadium, Al Rayyan
Attendance: 12,276
Referee: Mooud Bonyadifard (Iran)

== Winners ==
2024 AFC U-23 Asian Cup
(Japan)
Japan
2nd title

== Awards ==
The following awards were given at the conclusion of the tournament:

Top scorer	Best player	Best goalkeeper	Fair-play award
(Iraq) Ali Jasim	(Japan) Joel Chima Fujita	(Uzbekistan) Abduvohid Nematov	Uzbekistan

== Qualified teams for the 2024 Summer Olympics ==
The following three teams from the AFC qualified for the 2024 Summer Olympic men's football tournament in France.

Team	Qualified on	Previous appearances in the Summer Olympics^{1}
Uzbekistan	29 April 2024	0 (debut)
Japan	29 April 2024	11 (1936, 1956, 1964, 1968, 1996, 2000, 2004, 2008, 2012, 2016, 2020)
Iraq	2 May 2024	5 (1980, 1984, 1988, 2004, 2016)

^{1} Italic indicates hosts for that year.

== Broadcasting rights ==
Territory	Broadcasters	Ref.
Australia	Paramount+	
Indonesia	MNC Media	
Iraq	4th Sports	
Japan	DAZN, NHK General TV, TV Asahi	
Malaysia	Astro	
Saudi Arabia	SSC, Shahid	
South Korea	tvN Sports	
Uzbekistan	MTRK SportTV	
Vietnam	VTV, FPT	
Latin America	ESPN, Disney+	

== Statistics ==
=== Goalscorers ===
There were 84 goals scored in 32 matches, for an average of 2.62 goals per match.

4 goals

- (Iraq) Ali Jasim

3 goals

- (Saudi Arabia) Abdullah Radif
- (Saudi Arabia) Aiman Yahya
- (South Korea) Lee Young-jun
- (Uzbekistan) Khusayin Norchaev

2 goals

- (Indonesia) Komang Teguh
- (Indonesia) Marselino Ferdinan
- (Indonesia) Rafael Struick
- (Japan) Mao Hosoya
- (Japan) Seiji Kimura
- (Japan) Fuki Yamada
- (Kuwait) Salman Al-Awadi
- (Qatar) Ahmed Al-Rawi
- (Saudi Arabia) Ahmed Al-Ghamdi
- (Tajikistan) Rustam Soirov
- (Uzbekistan) Alisher Odilov
- (Vietnam) Bùi Vĩ Hào

1 goal

- (China) Liu Zhurun
- (China) Xie Wenneng
- (Indonesia) Ivar Jenner
- (Indonesia) Witan Sulaeman
- (Iraq) Hassan Khalid
- (Iraq) Muntadher Mohammed
- (Iraq) Karrar Saad
- (Iraq) Mustafa Saadoon
- (Iraq) Zaid Tahseen
- (Japan) Ryotaro Araki
- (Japan) Sota Kawasaki
- (Japan) Kuryu Matsuki
- (Japan) Kotaro Uchino
- (Jordan) Aref Al-Haj
- (Kuwait) Talal Al-Qaisi
- (Malaysia) Haqimi Azim
- (Qatar) Khalid Ali Sabah
- (Qatar) Jassem Gaber
- (Qatar) Mohamed Al-Manai
- (Qatar) Abdullah Al-Yazidi
- (Saudi Arabia) Haitham Asiri
- (Saudi Arabia) Rayan Hamed
- (South Korea) Jeong Sang-bin
- (South Korea) Kim Min-woo
- (Tajikistan) Ruslan Khayloev
- (Tajikistan) Mekhron Madaminov
- (Tajikistan) Manuchekhr Safarov
- (Thailand) Waris Choolthong
- (Thailand) Teerasak Poeiphimai
- (United Arab Emirates) Ahmed Fawzi
- (Uzbekistan) Alibek Davronov
- (Uzbekistan) Khojimat Erkinov
- (Uzbekistan) Jasurbek Jaloliddinov
- (Uzbekistan) Ruslanbek Jiyanov
- (Uzbekistan) Mukhammadkodir Khamraliev
- (Uzbekistan) Diyor Kholmatov
- (Uzbekistan) Ulugbek Khoshimov
- (Uzbekistan) Umarali Rakhmonaliev
- (Vietnam) Khuất Văn Khang
- (Vietnam) Nguyễn Văn Tùng
- (Vietnam) Võ Hoàng Minh Khoa

1 own goal

- (Indonesia) Pratama Arhan (against Uzbekistan)
- (Indonesia) Justin Hubner (against Jordan)
- (Indonesia) Komang Teguh (against South Korea)

=== Final ranking ===
Ranking criteria
For teams eliminated in the quarter-finals, the following criteria are applied, in the order given, to determine the final rankings:
1. Goal difference in the quarter-finals;
2. Goals scored in the quarter-finals;
3. Points in group stage;
4. Goal difference in group stage;
5. Goals scored in group stage;
6. Disciplinary points;
7. Drawing of lots.

For teams eliminated in the group stage, the following criteria are applied, in the order given, to determine the final rankings:

1. Position in group;
2. Points;
3. Goal difference;
4. Goals scored;
5. Disciplinary points;
6. Drawing of lots.

Pos	Grp	Team	Pld	W	D	L	GF	GA	GD	Pts	Final result
1	B	Japan	6	5	0	1	10	3	+7	15	Champions
2	D	Uzbekistan	6	5	0	1	14	1	+13	15	Runners-up
3	C	Iraq	6	4	0	2	9	8	+1	12	Third place
4	A	Indonesia	6	2	1	3	8	9	−1	7	Fourth place
5	B	South Korea	4	3	1	0	6	2	+4	10 (Note: Goal difference in the quarter-finals: South Korea 0, Vietnam –1, Qatar –2, Saudi Arabia –2. Goals scored in the quarter-finals: Qatar 2, Saudi Arabia 0.)	Eliminated in quarter-finals
6	D	Vietnam	4	2	0	2	5	5	0	6	Eliminated in quarter-finals
7	A	Qatar (H)	4	2	1	1	6	5	+1	7	Eliminated in quarter-finals
8	C	Saudi Arabia	4	2	0	2	10	6	+4	6	Eliminated in quarter-finals
9	B	China	3	1	0	2	2	4	−2	3	Eliminated in group stage
10	C	Tajikistan	3	1	0	2	5	8	−3	3	Eliminated in group stage
11	D	Kuwait	3	1	0	2	3	9	−6	3	Eliminated in group stage
12	A	Australia	3	0	2	1	0	1	−1	2 (Note: Position in group: Australia 3rd, Thailand 4th.)	Eliminated in group stage
13	C	Thailand	3	1	0	2	2	6	−4	3	Eliminated in group stage
14	A	Jordan	3	0	1	2	2	6	−4	1	Eliminated in group stage
15	B	United Arab Emirates	3	0	0	3	1	5	−4	0	Eliminated in group stage
16	D	Malaysia	3	0	0	3	1	6	−5	0	Eliminated in group stage

Source: AFC
(H) Hosts

== Controversies ==
=== Matches ===
==== Opening Match: Qatar vs Indonesia ====
The opening match of AFC U-23 Asian Cup in Group A, Qatar vs Indonesia, faced numerous backlashes due to controversial refereeing decisions from Tajikistan referee, Nasrullo Kabirov. The Indonesia U-23 national football team accused Kabirov of being biased towards Qatar, with Qatar receiving favourable decisions, while Indonesia was repeatedly scrutinized by Kadirov which leads to red cards for Ivar Jenner and Ramadhan Sananta.

Qatar took the lead in the first half with Khalid Ali Sabah scoring in the 45+1 minute through a penalty kick awarded by the referee for a foul committed by Indonesian defender Rizky Ridho against Qatari player Mahdi Salem. Initially, the referee awarded a free kick to Indonesia, but after consulting VAR, he ruled in favor of Qatar, leading to protests from the Indonesian players. Sabah converted the penalty, beating goalkeeper Ernando.

Ramadhan Sananta was also shown a direct red card during the match. Initially, the referee had issued a yellow card, but after a VAR review, he upgraded it to a red card during injury time.

Indonesian national football team head coach Shin Tae-yong expressed his outrage over the poor refereeing decisions:

Congratulations to Qatar. The players did their best to deliver a good performance, especially considering we were down in numbers and didn't give up easily. However, many of the referee's decisions throughout the game, if you look at them, it's not a football match, it's a comedy show and highly exaggerated. I can't say anything about the players who received red cards, I'm speechless. Football shouldn't be played like this. On our first red card, there was no contact at all. Why did they use VAR in situations like this?

Football Association of Indonesia (PSSI) has also sent a protest letter to AFC due to controversial decisions from referee Nasrullo Kabirov. The president of PSSI, Erick Thohir, confirmed this.

==== Jordan vs Qatar ====
Sivakorn Pu-udom, the Thai referee who officiated the match, was highlighted due to the controversies on second-half injury time. The injury time was only supposed to last 10 minutes. However, until the 100th (90+10') minute, he had not stopped the match, even when entering the 103rd (90+13') minute, in which midfielder Mohamed Al-Manai scored Qatar's second goal. Then, in the process of the goal, there was actually an incident where a Qatari player pulled a Jordanian player down. VAR had intervened, but Pu-udom was reluctant to look directly through the television screen on the side of the field. Pu-udom then decided to immediately legalize the goal, which led to Jordan's defeat and, ultimately, resulted in Jordan's worst ever U-23 Asian Cup performance.

== See also ==
- 2023 AFC Asian Cup
- 2024 AFC Women's Olympic Qualifying Tournament (AFC qualifiers for the 2024 Summer Olympics women's football tournament)
