= 2024 WAFF U-23 Championship squads =

WAFF Championship tournament

The 2024 WAFF U-23 Championship was an international football tournament held in Saudi Arabia from 20 to 26 March 2024. It was the fifth edition of the U-23 age group competition organized by the West Asian Football Federation.

The eight national teams involved in the tournament were required to register a squad of at most 26 players, including three goalkeepers. Only players in these squads were eligible to take part in the tournament. Players born on or after 1 January 2001 were eligible to compete in the tournament.

The full squad listings are below. The age listed for each player is on 20 March 2024, the first day of the tournament. The nationality of each club reflects the national association (not the league) to which the club is affiliated. A flag is included for coaches who are of a different nationality than their own national team. Players in boldface were capped at full international level prior to being called up.

== Group A ==
=== Jordan ===
Coach: Abdullah Abu Zema

The squad was announced on 10 March 2024.

No.	Pos.	Player	Date of birth (age)	Club
1	GK	Ahmad Al-Juaidi	9 April 2001 (aged 22)	(Jordan Football Association) Al-Wehdat
2	DF	Laith Abu Rahal	8 September 2001 (aged 22)	(Jordan Football Association) Al-Ahli
3	DF	Mo Abualnadi	8 February 2001 (aged 23)	(Jordan Football Association) Al-Hussein
4	DF	Danial Afaneh	24 March 2001 (aged 22)	(Jordan Football Association) Al-Wehdat
5	DF	Arafat Al-Haj	17 April 2003 (aged 20)	(Jordan Football Association) Al-Wehdat
6	FW	**Mohannad Abu Taha**	2 February 2003 (aged 21)	(Jordan Football Association) Al-Wehdat
7	FW	Saif Al-Bashabsheh	23 June 2001 (aged 22)	(Jordan Football Association) Al-Salt
8	DF	Baha Shamalty	15 April 2001 (aged 22)	(Jordan Football Association) Al-Ahli
9	MF	Amer Jamous	3 July 2002 (aged 21)	(Jordan Football Association) Al-Wehdat
10	MF	Waseem Al-Riyalat	25 June 2001 (aged 22)	(Jordan Football Association) Al-Hussein
11	MF	Bashar Al-Diabat	23 July 2001 (aged 22)	(Jordan Football Association) Al-Ramtha
12	GK	Osama Al-Kawamleh	16 August 2002 (aged 21)	(Jordan Football Association) Al-Jalil
13	MF	Omar Salah	18 April 2003 (aged 20)	(Qatar Football Association) Al-Wakrah
14	MF	Seif Darwish	5 May 2003 (aged 20)	(Jordan Football Association) Al-Hussein
15	FW	Ali Al-Azaizeh	13 April 2004 (aged 19)	(Jordan Football Association) Al-Ramtha
16	MF	Mohammad Abu Hazeem	2 April 2003 (aged 20)	(Jordan Football Association) Al-Faisaly
17	FW	Malek Allan	13 August 2002 (aged 21)	(Jordan Football Association) Ma'an
18	FW	Aref Al-Haj	28 May 2001 (aged 22)	(Jordan Football Association) Al-Faisaly
19	DF	Faisal Abu Shanab	9 August 2001 (aged 22)	(Jordan Football Association) Al-Faisaly
20	FW	Reziq Bani Hani	28 January 2002 (aged 22)	(Jordan Football Association) Al-Faisaly
21	FW	Baker Kalbouneh	14 August 2003 (aged 20)	(Jordan Football Association) Al-Faisaly
22	GK	Antoine Awad	3 October 2002 (aged 21)	(Canadian Soccer Association) Montreal Concordia
23	GK	Murad Al-Faluji	27 December 2003 (aged 20)	(Jordan Football Association) Al-Wehdat
24	MF	Aon Al-Maharmeh	16 January 2001 (aged 23)	(Jordan Football Association) Ma'an
25	DF	Youssef Hassan	2 February 2003 (aged 21)	(Jordan Football Association) Al-Jalil
26	MF	Ahmed Al-Salman	2 July 2002 (aged 21)	(Jordan Football Association) Al-Ramtha

=== Saudi Arabia ===
Coach: (Brazil) Marcos Soares

The squad was announced on 18 March 2024. On 19 March 2024, Abu Raseen withdrew from the squad due to injury and was replaced by Salman Al-Daajani.

No.	Pos.	Player	Date of birth (age)	Club
1	GK	Muhannad Al-Yahya	19 September 2004 (aged 19)	(Saudi Arabian Football Federation) Al-Fateh
2	DF	Ahmed Al-Julaydan	8 March 2004 (aged 20)	(Saudi Arabian Football Federation) Al-Fateh
3	DF	Suwailem Al-Manhali	17 April 2004 (aged 19)	(Saudi Arabian Football Federation) Al-Ittihad
4	DF	Mubarak Al-Rajeh	1 August 2003 (aged 20)	(Saudi Arabian Football Federation) Al-Raed
5	DF	Mohammed Barnawi	7 August 2005 (aged 18)	(Saudi Arabian Football Federation) Al-Hilal
6	DF	Saleh Barnawi	8 February 2007 (aged 17)	(Saudi Arabian Football Federation) Al-Hilal
7	MF	Younes Al-Shanqeeti	6 January 2004 (aged 20)	(Saudi Arabian Football Federation) Al-Ahli
8	MF	Abdullah Al-Zaid	8 January 2004 (aged 20)	(Saudi Arabian Football Federation) Al-Hilal
9	FW	Meshari Al-Nemer	5 August 2003 (aged 20)	(Saudi Arabian Football Federation) Al-Nassr
10	MF	**Musab Al-Juwayr**	20 June 2003 (aged 20)	(Saudi Arabian Football Federation) Al-Shabab
11	FW	Nawaf Al-Sahli	5 May 2003 (aged 20)	(Saudi Arabian Football Federation) Al-Raed
12	DF	Salem Al-Najdi	27 January 2003 (aged 21)	(Saudi Arabian Football Federation) Al-Fateh
13	DF	**Sulaiman Hazazi**	1 February 2003 (aged 21)	(Saudi Arabian Football Federation) Al-Qaisumah
14	DF	Abdulaziz Al-Faraj	23 June 2003 (aged 20)	(Saudi Arabian Football Federation) Al-Nassr
15	MF	Rakan Al-Ghamdi	6 September 2005 (aged 18)	(Saudi Arabian Football Federation) Al-Nassr
16	MF	Faisal Al-Asmari	1 August 2003 (aged 20)	(Saudi Arabian Football Federation) Al-Hilal
17	MF	Marwan Al-Sahafi	17 February 2004 (aged 20)	(Saudi Arabian Football Federation) Al-Ittihad
18	MF	Suhayb Al-Zaid	12 August 2004 (aged 19)	(Saudi Arabian Football Federation) Al-Hilal
19	FW	Yazeed Jawshan	4 May 2003 (aged 20)	(Saudi Arabian Football Federation) Al-Faisaly
20	MF	Abdullah Al-Anazi	19 January 2003 (aged 21)	(Saudi Arabian Football Federation) Al-Fateh
21	GK	Osama Al-Mermesh	6 July 2003 (aged 20)	(Saudi Arabian Football Federation) Al-Ittihad
22	GK	Salman Al-Daajani	18 June 2004 (aged 19)	(Saudi Arabian Football Federation) Al-Ahli
23	MF	Abdulkarim Darisi	18 April 2003 (aged 20)	(Saudi Arabian Football Federation) Al-Ahli

== Group B ==
=== South Korea ===
Coach: Myung Jae-yong

The squad was announced on 11 March 2024.

No.	Pos.	Player	Date of birth (age)	Club
1	GK	Kim Jeong-hoon	20 April 2001 (aged 22)	(Korea Football Association) Jeonbuk Hyundai Motors
2	DF	Cho Hyun-taek	2 August 2001 (aged 22)	(Korea Football Association) Gimcheon Sangmu
3	DF	Hwang Jae-won	16 August 2002 (aged 21)	(Korea Football Association) Daegu FC
4	DF	Seo Myung-gwan	23 November 2002 (aged 21)	(Korea Football Association) Bucheon FC 1995
5	DF	Byun Joon-soo	30 November 2001 (aged 22)	(Korea Football Association) Gwangju FC
6	FW	Lee Young-joon	23 May 2003 (aged 20)	(Korea Football Association) Gimcheon Sangmu
7	MF	Hong Si-hoo	8 January 2001 (aged 23)	(Korea Football Association) Incheon United
8	MF	Lee Kang-hee	24 August 2001 (aged 22)	(Korea Football Association) Gyeongnam FC
9	FW	An Jae-jun	3 April 2001 (aged 22)	(Korea Football Association) Bucheon FC 1995
10	FW	Kang Hyun-muk	28 March 2001 (aged 22)	(Korea Football Association) Gimcheon Sangmu
11	MF	**Eom Ji-sung**	9 May 2002 (aged 21)	(Korea Football Association) Gwangju FC
12	GK	Baek Jong-bum	21 January 2001 (aged 23)	(Korea Football Association) FC Seoul
13	MF	Paik Sang-hoon	7 January 2002 (aged 22)	(Korea Football Association) FC Seoul
14	MF	Lee Jae-uk	9 March 2001 (aged 23)	(Korea Football Association) Ulsan HD
15	MF	Kim Dong-jin	30 July 2003 (aged 20)	(Korea Football Association) Pohang Steelers
16	DF	Jang Si-young	31 March 2002 (aged 21)	(Korea Football Association) Ulsan HD
17	MF	**Yang Hyun-jun**	25 May 2002 (aged 21)	(Scottish Football Association) Celtic
18	MF	**Kang Seong-jin**	26 March 2003 (aged 20)	(Korea Football Association) FC Seoul
19	MF	Kim Min-woo	16 March 2002 (aged 22)	(German Football Association) Fortuna Düsseldorf II
20	MF	Bae Jun-ho	21 August 2003 (aged 20)	(The Football Association) Stoke City
21	GK	Shin Song-hoon	7 November 2002 (aged 21)	(Korea Football Association) Chungnam Asan
22	DF	Lee Tae-seok	28 July 2002 (aged 21)	(Korea Football Association) FC Seoul
23	DF	Kim Ji-soo	24 December 2004 (aged 19)	(The Football Association) Brentford B

=== Thailand ===
Coach: Issara Sritaro

The squad was announced on 12 March 2024.

No.	Pos.	Player	Date of birth (age)	Club
1	GK	Soponwit Rakyart	25 January 2001 (aged 23)	(Football Association of Thailand) Muangthong United
2	DF	Phongsakon Trisat	19 March 2001 (aged 23)	(Football Association of Thailand) Chonburi
3	DF	Warinthon Jamnongwat	6 April 2002 (aged 21)	(Football Association of Thailand) Chainat Hornbill
4	DF	Kritsada Nontharat	16 February 2001 (aged 23)	(Football Association of Thailand) Bangkok United
5	DF	Chonnapat Buaphan	22 March 2004 (aged 19)	(Football Association of Thailand) BG Pathum United
6	DF	Kittichai Yaidee	9 February 2002 (aged 22)	(Football Association of Thailand) Samut Prakan City
7	FW	Chitsanupong Choti	29 September 2001 (aged 22)	(Football Association of Thailand) Khonkaen United
8	MF	Natcha Promsomboon	8 February 2001 (aged 23)	(Football Association of Thailand) Ayutthaya United
9	FW	Guntapon Keereeleang	22 January 2001 (aged 23)	(Football Association of Thailand) Bangkok United
10	FW	Pattara Soimalai	27 August 2001 (aged 22)	(Football Association of Thailand) Chiangmai United
11	FW	Sitthinan Rungrueang	16 August 2002 (aged 21)	(Football Association of Thailand) Suphanburi
12	DF	Waris Choolthong	8 January 2004 (aged 20)	(Football Association of Thailand) BG Pathum United
13	MF	Kittisak Putchan	2 February 2001 (aged 23)	(Football Association of Thailand) Nakhon Pathom United
14	MF	Phanthamit Praphanth	12 September 2003 (aged 20)	(Football Association of Thailand) DP Kanchanaburi
15	MF	Thanadol Kaosaart	18 August 2001 (aged 22)	(Football Association of Thailand) Customs United
16	MF	Seksan Ratree	14 March 2003 (aged 21)	(Football Association of Thailand) Buriram United
17	FW	Chukid Wanpraphao	2 July 2001 (aged 22)	(Football Association of Thailand) Ayutthaya United
18	MF	Sittha Boonlha	2 September 2004 (aged 19)	(Football Association of Thailand) Port
19	DF	Phon-Ek Jensen	30 May 2003 (aged 20)	(Football Association of Thailand) PT Prachuap
20	GK	Thirawooth Sruanson	10 November 2001 (aged 22)	(Football Association of Thailand) Kasetsart
21	MF	Songkhramsamut Namphueng	7 November 2003 (aged 20)	(Football Association of Thailand) Police Tero
22	DF	Pattarapon Suksakit	19 August 2003 (aged 20)	(Football Association of Thailand) Sukhothai
23	GK	Natthapat Makthuam	10 January 2005 (aged 19)	(Football Association of Thailand) Police Tero

== Group C ==
=== Egypt ===
Coach: (Brazil) Rogério Micale

The squad was announced on 13 March 2024.

No.	Pos.	Player	Date of birth (age)	Club
1	GK	Hamza Alaa	1 March 2001 (aged 23)	(Egyptian Football Association) Al Ahly
2	DF	Omar Fayed	4 July 2003 (aged 20)	(Football Association of Serbia) Novi Pazar
3	DF	Mohamed El Maghrabi	28 April 2001 (aged 22)	(Egyptian Football Association) Smouha
4	DF	Ahmed Eid	1 January 2001 (aged 23)	(Egyptian Football Association) Al Masry
5	DF	Hossam Abdelmaguid	30 April 2001 (aged 22)	(Egyptian Football Association) Zamalek
6	MF	Mahmoud Gehad	20 August 2001 (aged 22)	(Egyptian Football Association) Pharco
7	MF	Mahmoud Saber	30 July 2001 (aged 22)	(Egyptian Football Association) Pyramids
8	DF	Ahmed Mahmoud	1 January 2003 (aged 21)	(Egyptian Football Association) El Gouna
9	FW	**Osama Faisal**	1 January 2001 (aged 23)	(Egyptian Football Association) National Bank of Egypt
10	MF	Ibrahim Adel	23 April 2001 (aged 22)	(Egyptian Football Association) Pyramids
11	MF	Mohamed Hamdi	26 February 2003 (aged 21)	(Egyptian Football Association) ENPPI
12	FW	Nader Farag	1 April 2001 (aged 22)	(Egyptian Football Association) Ismaily
13	DF	Karim El Debes	3 June 2003 (aged 20)	(Egyptian Football Association) Al Ahly
14	MF	Ahmed Atef	19 December 2002 (aged 21)	(Egyptian Football Association) ZED
15	DF	Mohamed Tarek	20 April 2002 (aged 21)	(Egyptian Football Association) Al Masry
16	GK	Ali El Gabry	14 February 2001 (aged 23)	(Egyptian Football Association) Ceramica Cleopatra
17	MF	Mohamed Shehata	8 February 2001 (aged 23)	(Egyptian Football Association) Zamalek
18	FW	Bilal Mazhar	21 November 2003 (aged 20)	(Hellenic Football Federation) Panathinaikos B
19	MF	Moustafa Ashraf	15 February 2004 (aged 20)	(German Football Association) Borussia Mönchengladbach II
20	MF	Omar El Saaiy	1 January 2003 (aged 21)	(Egyptian Football Association) Ismaily
21	MF	Ahmed Nader Hawash	14 March 2003 (aged 21)	(Egyptian Football Association) ENPPI
22	FW	Mostafa Saad	22 August 2001 (aged 22)	(Egyptian Football Association) ZED
23	GK	Mohamed Seha	1 May 2001 (aged 22)	(Egyptian Football Association) Al Mokawloon Al Arab

=== United Arab Emirates ===
Coach: (Uruguay) Marcelo Broli

The squad was announced on 13 March 2024.

No.	Pos.	Player	Date of birth (age)	Club
1	GK	Rakan Al-Menhali	27 March 2001 (aged 22)	(United Arab Emirates Football Association) Al Jazira
2	DF	Mohammed Al-Maazmi	16 January 2001 (aged 23)	(United Arab Emirates Football Association) Hatta
3	DF	Mayed Al-Teneiji	21 June 2002 (aged 21)	(United Arab Emirates Football Association) Al Nasr
4	MF	Ahmed Al-Hammadi	6 January 2001 (aged 23)	(United Arab Emirates Football Association) Al Jazira
5	DF	Khamis Al-Mansoori	15 January 2004 (aged 20)	(United Arab Emirates Football Association) Baniyas
6	DF	Ahmed Malallah	20 November 2003 (aged 20)	(United Arab Emirates Football Association) United
7	MF	Fahad Bader	9 March 2001 (aged 23)	(United Arab Emirates Football Association) Emirates
8	MF	Sultan Al Bedwawi	6 October 2001 (aged 22)	(United Arab Emirates Football Association) Hatta
9	MF	Hamdan Al-Beshr	6 November 2002 (aged 21)	(United Arab Emirates Football Association) Fujairah
10	FW	Abdulla Abdelaziz	10 June 2002 (aged 21)	(United Arab Emirates Football Association) Ajman
11	FW	Yaser Al-Blooshi	6 January 2001 (aged 23)	(United Arab Emirates Football Association) Ittihad Kalba
12	DF	Mohammad Atiq	2 March 2001 (aged 23)	(United Arab Emirates Football Association) Shabab Al Ahli
13	DF	Abdulla Al-Balooshi	1 January 2001 (aged 23)	(United Arab Emirates Football Association) Al Nasr
14	DF	Hamdan Al-Ameri	31 August 2002 (aged 21)	(United Arab Emirates Football Association) Hatta
15	DF	Waleed Rashid	2 July 2002 (aged 21)	(United Arab Emirates Football Association) Ittihad Kalba
16	FW	Ahmed Fawzi	26 November 2001 (aged 22)	(United Arab Emirates Football Association) Al Jazira
17	GK	Hamad Al-Meqbali	13 July 2003 (aged 20)	(United Arab Emirates Football Association) Shabab Al Ahli
18	MF	Mohammed Al-Wafi	1 July 2003 (aged 20)	(United Arab Emirates Football Association) Al Jazira
19	FW	Mayed Al-Kass	6 May 2003 (aged 20)	(United Arab Emirates Football Association) Sharjah
20	FW	Mohammed Al-Mansoori	30 May 2006 (aged 17)	(United Arab Emirates Football Association) Shabab Al Ahli
21	MF	Abdulla Ahmed	13 June 2004 (aged 19)	(United Arab Emirates Football Association) Al Wahda
22	GK	Saeed Al-Moqadami	21 August 2004 (aged 19)	(United Arab Emirates Football Association) Fujairah
23	MF	Ali Abdulaziz	16 July 2003 (aged 20)	(United Arab Emirates Football Association) Al Nasr
24	FW	Khalifa Khamis	28 February 2003 (aged 21)	(United Arab Emirates Football Association) Shabab Al Ahli
25	DF	Khalid Al-Balooshi	24 April 2002 (aged 21)	(United Arab Emirates Football Association) Al Ain
26	MF	Mubarak Bani Zamah	29 November 2003 (aged 20)	(United Arab Emirates Football Association) Al Jazira

== Group D ==
=== Australia ===
Coach: Tony Vidmar

The squad was announced on 8 March 2024.

No.	Pos.	Player	Date of birth (age)	Club
1	GK	Steven Hall	16 January 2005 (aged 19)	(The Football Association) Brighton & Hove Albion
2	DF	Jacob Italiano	30 July 2001 (aged 22)	(German Football Association) Borussia Mönchengladbach
3	DF	Franco Lino	26 August 2005 (aged 18)	(Norwegian Football Federation) Viking
4	DF	Jordan Courtney-Perkins	6 November 2002 (aged 21)	(Football Australia) Sydney FC
5	DF	Lucas Mauragis	4 September 2001 (aged 22)	(Football Australia) Newcastle Jets
6	DF	Giuseppe Bovalina	11 November 2004 (aged 19)	(Football Australia) Adelaide United
7	FW	Lachlan Brook	8 February 2001 (aged 23)	(Football Australia) Western Sydney Wanderers
8	MF	Louis D'Arrigo	23 September 2001 (aged 22)	(Polish Football Association) Lechia Gdańsk
9	FW	Alou Kuol	5 July 2001 (aged 22)	(Football Australia) Central Coast Mariners
10	MF	Jake Hollman	26 August 2001 (aged 22)	(Football Australia) Macarthur FC
11	FW	Nishan Velupillay	7 May 2001 (aged 22)	(Football Australia) Melbourne Victory
12	GK	Cameron Cook	16 August 2001 (aged 22)	(Football Australia) Perth Glory
13	DF	Alexandar Popovic	7 September 2002 (aged 21)	(Korea Football Association) Gwangju FC
14	FW	Jahce Novello	18 April 2004 (aged 19)	(Italian Football Federation) Cosenza
15	DF	Hosine Bility	10 May 2001 (aged 22)	(Portuguese Football Federation) Mafra
16	MF	Paul Okon-Engstler	24 January 2005 (aged 19)	(Portuguese Football Federation) Benfica
17	MF	Jordi Valadon	4 March 2003 (aged 21)	(Football Australia) Melbourne Victory
18	GK	Patrick Beach	6 August 2003 (aged 20)	(Football Australia) Melbourne City
19	MF	Rhys Youlley	13 February 2005 (aged 19)	(Royal Belgian Football Association) Westerlo
20	DF	Mark Natta	28 November 2002 (aged 21)	(Football Australia) Newcastle Jets
21	FW	Adrian Segecic	1 June 2004 (aged 19)	(Royal Dutch Football Association) Dordrecht
22	FW	**Garang Kuol**	15 September 2004 (aged 19)	(Royal Dutch Football Association) Volendam
23	FW	Nicolas Milanovic	14 November 2001 (aged 22)	(Football Australia) Western Sydney Wanderers
24	MF	Corey Hollman	25 September 2003 (aged 20)	(Football Australia) Sydney FC
25	DF	Jake Girdwood-Reich	26 May 2004 (aged 19)	(Football Australia) Sydney FC
26	FW	Thomas Waddingham	5 April 2005 (aged 18)	(Football Australia) Brisbane Roar

=== Iraq ===
Coach: Ehsan Atiyah

The squad was announced on 11 March 2024.

No.	Pos.	Player	Date of birth (age)	Club
1	GK	Layth Qasim		(Iraq Football Association) Al-Shorta
2	DF	Mohammed Ghaleb		(Iraq Football Association) Al-Minaa
3	DF	Mousa Alaa		(Iraq Football Association) Al-Quwa Al-Jawiya
4	DF	Kadhim Raad Hatem		(Iraq Football Association) Al-Zawraa
5	MF	Abbas Majed		(Iraq Football Association) Al-Talaba
6	DF	Adam Rasheed	10 July 2006 (aged 17)	(Danish Football Association) AaB
7	MF	Halgurd Jaafar		(Iraq Football Association) Peshmerga Hawler
8	MF	Amoori Mutshar	1 May 2005 (aged 18)	(Iraq Football Association) Al-Kahrabaa
9	FW	Mustafa Qabeel	8 January 2005 (aged 19)	(Iraq Football Association) Erbil
10	FW	Ali Akbar	30 December 2006 (aged 17)	(Iraq Football Association) Al-Shorta
11	FW	Ali Haydar	1 October 2005 (aged 18)	(The Football Association) Stoke City U18
12	GK	Wisam Ali		(Iraq Football Association) Naft Al-Wasat
13	DF	Hussein Fahim		(Iraq Football Association) Al-Talaba
14	DF	Sajjad Fadhil	5 May 2004 (aged 19)	(Iraq Football Association) Al-Zawraa
15	MF	Ali Mokhalad		(Iraq Football Association) Al-Quwa Al-Jawiya
16	FW	Ahmed Jasim		(Iraq Football Association) Al-Naft
17	DF	Muslim Mousa		(Iraq Football Association) Al-Minaa
18	MF	Ali Sadiq		(Iraq Football Association) Al-Zawraa
19	DF	Sajjad Mahdi		(Iraq Football Association) Naft Maysan
20	FW	Karrar Jaafar		(Iraq Football Association) Al-Minaa
21	MF	Hayder Abdulkareem	7 August 2004 (aged 19)	(Iraq Football Association) Al-Zawraa
22	GK	Sajjad Mohammed		(Iraq Football Association) Amanat Baghdad
23	MF	Moamel Mahmoud		(Iraq Football Association) Naft Al-Wasat
24	DF	Ali Kareem		
25	MF	Laith Deaa		(Iraq Football Association) Al-Quwa Al-Jawiya
26	MF	Mustafa Nawaf	5 May 2005 (aged 18)	(Iraq Football Association) Al-Amwaj
