= 2021 WAFF U-23 Championship squads =

WAFF Championship tournament

The 2021 WAFF U-23 Championship was an international football tournament held in Saudi Arabia from 4 to 12 October 2021. It was the second edition of the U-23 age group competition organised by the West Asian Football Federation.

The eleven national teams involved in the tournament were required to register a squad of at most 23 players, including three goalkeepers. Only players in these squads were eligible to take part in the tournament. Players born on or after 1 January 1998 were eligible to compete in the tournament.

The full squad listings are below. The age listed for each player is on 4 October 2021, the first day of the tournament. The nationality for each club reflects the national association (not the league) to which the club is affiliated. A flag is included for coaches who are of a different nationality than their own national team. Players in boldface were capped at full international level prior to being called up.

== Group A ==
=== Kuwait ===
Coach: (Spain) Carlos González

The preliminary squad was announced on 22 September 2021.

No.	Pos.	Player	Date of birth (age)	Club
1	GK	Khaled Al-Ajaji	18 March 1999 (aged 22)	(Kuwait Football Association) Al-Fahaheel
2	DF	Abdullah Al-Jazzaf	20 June 2000 (aged 21)	(Kuwait Football Association) Kazma
3	DF	Jasem Ateeq		(Kuwait Football Association) Al-Sahel
4	DF	Rashed Al-Dawsari	18 July 2000 (aged 21)	(Kuwait Football Association) Al-Qadsia
5	MF	Othman Al-Shammari	4 April 2000 (aged 21)	(Kuwait Football Association) Kazma
6	DF	Abdulaziz Naji	19 August 2001 (aged 20)	(Kuwait Football Association) Al-Kuwait
7	FW	Yousef Al-Rashidi	18 March 2000 (aged 21)	(Kuwait Football Association) Al-Kuwait
8	MF	Nasser Faleh	1 January 1999 (aged 22)	(Kuwait Football Association) Kazma
9	FW	Fawaz Al-Mbelesh	8 January 1999 (aged 22)	(Kuwait Football Association) Khaitan
10	MF	**Mobarak Al-Faneeni**	21 January 2000 (aged 21)	(Kuwait Football Association) Al-Salmiya
11	MF	Eid Al-Rashidi	25 May 1999 (aged 22)	(Kuwait Football Association) Al-Qadsia
12	DF	**Khaled Al-Fadhli**		(Kuwait Football Association) Al-Qadsia
13	DF	Ali Abdulrasoul	13 January 1999 (aged 22)	(Kuwait Football Association) Al-Yarmouk
14	DF	Yousef Al-Haqan	5 March 2002 (aged 19)	(Kuwait Football Association) Al-Qadsia
15	DF	Hamad Al-Qallaf	4 December 1999 (aged 21)	(Kuwait Football Association) Al-Salmiya
16	DF	**Mahdi Dashti**	26 October 2001 (aged 19)	(Kuwait Football Association) Al-Salmiya
17	FW	Talal Al-Qaisi	24 February 2002 (aged 19)	(Kuwait Football Association) Kazma
18	MF	Hussain Dashti	26 January 2002 (aged 19)	(Kuwait Football Association) Al-Arabi
19	MF	**Bandar Al Salamah**	28 October 2002 (aged 18)	(Kuwait Football Association) Al-Arabi
20	MF	Mohammed Al-Huwaidi	29 January 1999 (aged 22)	(Kuwait Football Association) Al-Salmiya
21	MF	Salman Al-Bous		(Kuwait Football Association) Al-Sahel
23	GK	Abdulrahman Kamil	8 March 2001 (aged 20)	(Kuwait Football Association) Al-Kuwait

=== Oman ===
Coach: (Croatia) Dario Bašić

The squad was announced on 23 September 2021.

No.	Pos.	Player	Date of birth (age)	Club
1	GK	Islam Al Hinaai	22 July 2000 (aged 21)	(Oman Football Association) Ibri
2	DF	Issa Al Naabi		(Oman Football Association) Muscat
3	DF	Qasim Al Mubarak		(Oman Football Association) Oman
4	DF	Saud Al Habsi	21 August 1999 (aged 22)	(Oman Football Association) Oman
5	DF	Yahya Al Hudaifi		(Oman Football Association) Al-Seeb
6	MF	Hamad Al Mukhaini	15 March 2002 (aged 19)	(Oman Football Association) Al-Orouba
7	MF	Fahad Al Hajri		(Oman Football Association) Al-Nahda
8	MF	Mohammed Al Breiki		(Oman Football Association) Saham
9	FW	Abdullah Al Balushi		(Oman Football Association) Al-Suwaiq
10	MF	Hussain Al Shahri		(Oman Football Association) Dhofar
11	MF	Omar Al Salti	17 February 2002 (aged 19)	(Oman Football Association) Al-Orouba
12	GK	Ibrahim Al Rajhi		(Oman Football Association) Al-Nasr
13	DF	Al Baraa Al Mawali	11 December 2000 (aged 20)	(Oman Football Association) Al-Mussanah
14	DF	Al Husain Al Haddad		(Oman Football Association) Al-Ittihad
15	MF	Fahad Al Obaidan		(Oman Football Association) Al-Nasr
16	DF	Mohammed Al Seem		(Oman Football Association) Dhofar
17	DF	Yousuf Al Malki	21 August 2000 (aged 21)	(Oman Football Association) Al-Seeb
18	MF	Jasim Al Noobi		(Oman Football Association) Al-Nasr
19	MF	Hani Al Naaimi		(Oman Football Association) Sohar
20	FW	Awadh Al Shahri		(Oman Football Association) Dhofar
21	FW	Waleed Al Musalmi		(Oman Football Association) Al-Bahla
22	GK	Yousuf Al Sheyadi	13 February 2000 (aged 21)	(Oman Football Association) Sohar
23	MF	Sultan Said	15 September 2000 (aged 21)	(Oman Football Association) Al-Nasr

=== Jordan ===
Coach: Ahmad Hayel

The squad was announced on 30 September 2021.

No.	Pos.	Player	Date of birth (age)	Club
1	GK	Ahmad Al-Juaidi	9 April 2001 (aged 20)	(Jordan Football Association) Shabab Al-Ordon
2	DF	Hussam Abudahab	13 May 2000 (aged 21)	(Jordan Football Association) Al-Faisaly
3	DF	Yazan Abdelaal	7 January 1999 (aged 22)	(Jordan Football Association) Al-Yarmouk
4	DF	Danial Afaneh	24 March 2001 (aged 20)	(Jordan Football Association) Al-Wehdat
5	DF	Hadi Al-Hourani	4 March 2000 (aged 21)	(Jordan Football Association) Al-Ramtha
6	MF	Khaled Zakaria	18 September 2000 (aged 21)	(Jordan Football Association) Al-Wehdat
7	FW	**Omar Hani**	27 June 1999 (aged 22)	(Association of Football Federations of Azerbaijan) Gabala
8	MF	**Ibrahim Sadeh**	27 April 2000 (aged 21)	(Jordan Football Association) Al-Jazeera
9	FW	Mohammad Bani Attieh	13 February 1999 (aged 22)	(Jordan Football Association) Sahab
10	FW	Mohammad Aburiziq	1 February 1999 (aged 22)	(Jordan Football Association) Al-Baqa'a
11	FW	**Yazan Al-Naimat**	4 June 1999 (aged 22)	(Jordan Football Association) Sahab
12	GK	Osama Al-Kawamleh	16 October 2002 (aged 18)	(Jordan Football Association) Al-Jalil
13	DF	Shawky Al-Quzaa	14 January 1999 (aged 22)	(Jordan Football Association) Shabab Al-Ordon
14	DF	Bassam Daldoum	13 October 1999 (aged 21)	(Jordan Football Association) Al-Baqa'a
15	MF	Abdulrahman Abualkass	7 October 1999 (aged 21)	(Jordan Football Association) Al-Ramtha
16	MF	Faisal Haikal	14 February 2000 (aged 21)	(Jordan Football Association) Shabab Al-Ordon
17	FW	Amin Al-Shanaina	7 April 2003 (aged 18)	(Jordan Football Association) Al-Faisaly
18	FW	**Mohannad Abu Taha**	2 February 2003 (aged 18)	(Jordan Football Association) Al-Wehdat
19	MF	Khaled Siahin	5 June 2000 (aged 21)	(Jordan Football Association) Ma'an
20	MF	Waseem Al-Riyalat	16 August 2001 (aged 20)	(Jordan Football Association) Shabab Al-Ordon
21	FW	Abdullah Awad	19 February 2000 (aged 21)	(Jordan Football Association) Al-Faisaly
22	GK	Aseel Al-Siahin	14 November 2001 (aged 19)	(Jordan Football Association) Al-Hussein
23	DF	Yousef Abualjazar	25 October 1999 (aged 21)	(Jordan Football Association) Al-Ramtha

=== Yemen ===
Coach: Amin Al-Sanini

The squad was announced on 27 September 2021.

== Group B ==
=== Lebanon ===
Coach: Jamal Taha

The squad was announced on 1 October 2021.

No.	Pos.	Player	Date of birth (age)	Club
1	GK	Hadi Mortada	1 August 1999 (aged 22)	(Lebanese Football Association) Ansar
2	DF	Tony Mikhael	1 March 2000 (aged 21)	(Canadian Soccer Association) Valour FC
3	DF	Hussein Fahes	5 October 1999 (aged 21)	(Lebanese Football Association) Sagesse
4	DF	Mohammad El Hayek	19 February 2000 (aged 21)	(Lebanese Football Association) Ahed
5	DF	Houssein Mortada	14 September 2000 (aged 21)	(Lebanese Football Association) Ahed
6	MF	Kassem Hayek	10 January 2000 (aged 21)	(Lebanese Football Association) Safa
7	FW	Jihad Eid	2 December 2000 (aged 20)	(Lebanese Football Association) Tripoli
8	MF	Hussein Awada	1 January 2000 (aged 21)	(Lebanese Football Association) Shabab Bourj
9	FW	Mohammad Nasser	16 October 2001 (aged 19)	(Lebanese Football Association) Ahed
10	MF	Mahdi Zein	23 May 2000 (aged 21)	(Lebanese Football Association) Nejmeh
11	MF	Youssef Al Haj	1 January 1999 (aged 22)	(Lebanese Football Association) Ansar
13	MF	Mohamed Shour	8 June 2000 (aged 21)	(Lebanese Football Association) Safa
14	FW	Hassan Kaafarani	17 December 2001 (aged 19)	(Lebanese Football Association) Ansar
16	DF	Andrew Sawaya	30 April 2000 (aged 21)	(Lebanese Football Association) Nejmeh
17	FW	Zein Farran	21 July 1999 (aged 22)	(Lebanese Football Association) Ahed
18	MF	Hasan Srour	18 December 2001 (aged 19)	(Lebanese Football Association) Ahed
19	FW	Karim Mekkaoui	19 April 2001 (aged 20)	(Cyprus Football Association) Othellos Athienou
20	FW	Khalil Bader	27 July 1999 (aged 22)	(Lebanese Football Association) Nejmeh
21	GK	Tarek Najia	23 June 2001 (aged 20)	(The Football Association) Farnborough
23	GK	Mohammad Zahr	26 February 2000 (aged 21)	(Lebanese Football Association) AC Sporting

=== Iraq ===
Coach: (Czech Republic) Miroslav Soukup

The squad was announced on 30 September 2021.

No.	Pos.	Player	Date of birth (age)	Club
1	GK	Emad Eisa		(Iraq Football Association) Zakho
2	DF	Abbas Badie	9 January 2000 (aged 21)	(Iraq Football Association) Al-Mina'a
3	DF	Ahmed Maknzi	1 January 2001 (aged 20)	(Iraq Football Association) Al-Zawraa
4	DF	Hussein Ammar	16 June 2001 (aged 20)	(Iraq Football Association) Naft Al-Basra
5	MF	Sadeq Zamel	15 July 1999 (aged 22)	(Iraq Football Association) Al-Shorta
6	DF	Zaid Tahseen	29 January 2001 (aged 20)	(Iraq Football Association) Al-Talaba
7	FW	Redha Fadhel		(Iraq Football Association) Amanat Baghdad
8	MF	Zidane Iqbal	27 April 2003 (aged 18)	(The Football Association) Manchester United
9	DF	Wakaa Ramadan	17 April 1999 (aged 22)	(Iraq Football Association) Al-Talaba
10	MF	Hasan Abdulkareem	1 January 1999 (aged 22)	(Iraq Football Association) Al-Karkh
11	MF	Muntadher Abdulameer	6 October 2001 (aged 19)	(Iraq Football Association) Al-Karkh
12	GK	Nadeem Omar	20 August 2001 (aged 20)	(Swedish Football Association) Falkenberg
13	MF	Abbas Yas		(Iraq Football Association) Al-Mina'a
14	FW	Nehad Mohammed		(Iraq Football Association) Al-Diwaniya
15	DF	Mohammed Al-Baqer	8 April 2000 (aged 21)	(Iraq Football Association) Al-Quwa Al-Jawiya
16	DF	Muntadher Mohammed	5 June 2000 (aged 21)	(Iraq Football Association) Al-Zawraa
17	MF	Ahmed Sartip	20 February 2000 (aged 21)	(Iraq Football Association) Al-Zawraa
18	DF	Mustafa Walid		(Iraq Football Association) Al-Karkh
19	DF	**Hassan Raed**	23 September 2000 (aged 21)	(Iraq Football Association) Al-Quwa Al-Jawiya
20	MF	Ali Mohsen	4 March 1998 (aged 23)	(Iraq Football Association) Al-Naft
21	FW	Ammar Ghalib	13 March 2001 (aged 20)	(Iraq Football Association) Al-Shorta
22	GK	Hassan Ahmed	4 October 1999 (aged 22)	(Iraq Football Association) Al-Talaba
23	MF	Moamel Abdulridha	28 March 2000 (aged 21)	(Iraq Football Association) Amanat Baghdad

=== Palestine ===
Coach: Ihab Abu Jazar

No.	Pos.	Player	Date of birth (age)	Club
1	GK	Ali Wridat	26 June 1999 (aged 22)	(Palestinian Football Association) Shabab Al-Dhahiriya
2	DF	Walid Qonbor	24 April 1999 (aged 22)	(Palestinian Football Association) Jabal Al-Mukaber
3	DF	Fadi Qatmish	9 March 1998 (aged 23)	(Palestinian Football Association) Markaz Balata
4	MF	**Ameed Sawafta**	10 July 2000 (aged 21)	(Palestinian Football Association) Tubas
5	FW	**Dawoud Iraqi**	13 September 1999 (aged 22)	(German Football Association) Berliner AK 07
6	DF	Amir Qatawi	1 May 1999 (aged 22)	(Palestinian Football Association) Markaz Balata
7	MF	Jamal Hamed	10 March 2002 (aged 19)	(Royal Spanish Football Federation) Leioa
8	MF	Ahmad Al Taweel		(Palestinian Football Association) Bireh Youth Foundation
9	FW	**Zaid Qunbar**	4 September 2002 (aged 19)	(Palestinian Football Association) Shabab Al-Dhahiriya
11	FW	**Bader Mousa**	11 April 1999 (aged 22)	(Egyptian Football Association) Ghazl El Mahalla
12	MF	**Hamed Hamdan**	3 October 2000 (aged 21)	(Egyptian Football Association) Tanta
13	DF	Laeth Hasoun		(Syrian Football Association) Al-Nawair
14	FW	Khaled Al-Nabris	27 March 2003 (aged 18)	(Palestinian Football Association) Ittihad Khanyounis
15	MF	Anas Bani Odeh	7 September 2001 (aged 20)	(Palestinian Football Association) Markaz Shabab Al-Am'ari
17	MF	Mohammed Direya	2 July 2001 (aged 20)	(Palestinian Football Association) Shabab Al-Khalil
18	DF	Bashar Shobaki	16 April 2000 (aged 21)	(Palestinian Football Association) Bireh Youth Foundation
19	MF	Ahmed Abuhasanein	26 July 2000 (aged 21)	(Palestinian Football Association) Khadamat Al-Shatee
20	MF	Ahmed Kullab	8 November 2001 (aged 19)	(Palestinian Football Association) Ittihad Khanyounis
21	DF	Mohammed Al-Taramsi		(Palestinian Football Association) Al-Hellal Gaza
22	GK	Mohammed Ahmed	18 February 1999 (aged 22)	(Palestinian Football Association) Markaz Shabab Al-Am'ari
23	DF	**Wajdi Nabhan**		(Palestinian Football Association) Bireh Youth Foundation

=== United Arab Emirates ===
Coach: (Spain) Denis Silva

The squad was announced on 30 September 2021.

No.	Pos.	Player	Date of birth (age)	Club
1	GK	Salem Khairi	22 July 1999 (aged 22)	(United Arab Emirates Football Association) Al-Jazira
2	DF	Abdulla Idrees	16 August 1999 (aged 22)	(United Arab Emirates Football Association) Al-Jazira
3	DF	Yousif Al-Mheiri	30 November 1999 (aged 21)	(United Arab Emirates Football Association) Al-Wasl
4	MF	Ahmed Mahmoud	6 January 2001 (aged 20)	(United Arab Emirates Football Association) Emirates
5	DF	Saeed Suleiman	18 April 1999 (aged 22)	(United Arab Emirates Football Association) Ajman
6	MF	Hussain Mahdi	24 July 2000 (aged 21)	(United Arab Emirates Football Association) Al-Nasr
7	FW	**Ali Saleh**	22 January 2000 (aged 21)	(United Arab Emirates Football Association) Al-Wasl
9	FW	Abdulla Anwar	2 June 1999 (aged 22)	(United Arab Emirates Football Association) Al-Nasr
10	MF	Khalid Al-Balochi	22 March 1999 (aged 22)	(United Arab Emirates Football Association) Al Ain
11	MF	Khalfan Hassan	7 January 1999 (aged 22)	(United Arab Emirates Football Association) Shabab Al-Ahli
12	DF	Ahmed Abdulla	16 January 1999 (aged 22)	(United Arab Emirates Football Association) Shabab Al-Ahli
13	DF	Faris Khalil	8 October 2000 (aged 20)	(United Arab Emirates Football Association) Al-Wasl
14	MF	Saeed Obaid	25 November 1999 (aged 21)	(United Arab Emirates Football Association) Sharjah
15	MF	Mansoor Al-Harbi	14 July 1999 (aged 22)	(United Arab Emirates Football Association) Al-Wahda
16	FW	Ahmed Fawzi	26 November 2001 (aged 19)	(United Arab Emirates Football Association) Al-Jazira
17	GK	Rakan Al Menhali	27 March 2001 (aged 20)	(United Arab Emirates Football Association) Al-Jazira
19	MF	Marwan Fahad	16 August 1999 (aged 22)	(United Arab Emirates Football Association) Khor Fakkan
20	MF	Naser Al-Shikali	25 March 2000 (aged 21)	(United Arab Emirates Football Association) Al Ain
21	MF	Abdallah Sultan	21 March 1999 (aged 22)	(United Arab Emirates Football Association) Baniyas
22	GK	Raed Reda	2 April 1999 (aged 22)	(United Arab Emirates Football Association) Shabab Al-Ahli
23	FW	Abdulla Abdulrahman	25 January 2000 (aged 21)	(United Arab Emirates Football Association) Khor Fakkan
24	FW	Rashid Mubarak	8 March 1998 (aged 23)	(United Arab Emirates Football Association) Hatta
26	MF	Eid Khamis	20 May 1999 (aged 22)	(United Arab Emirates Football Association) Shabab Al-Ahli

== Group C ==
=== Bahrain ===
Coach: Ismail Karami

The squad was announced on 3 October 2021.

No.	Pos.	Player	Date of birth (age)	Club
2	DF	Saud Al-Asam	4 October 1999 (aged 22)	(Bahrain Football Association) Al-Riffa
4	DF	Sayed Mohamed Ameen	7 March 1999 (aged 22)	(Bahrain Football Association) Al-Khaldiya
5	MF	Ebrahim Shareeda	7 September 2001 (aged 20)	(Bahrain Football Association) Al-Najma
6	MF	Hamza Abdulla	23 June 1999 (aged 22)	(Bahrain Football Association) East Riffa
7	MF	Ahmed Al-Sherooqi	22 May 2000 (aged 21)	(Bahrain Football Association) Al-Muharraq
8	MF	Hasan Isa		(Bahrain Football Association) Al-Malkiya
9	FW	Ali Meftah		(Bahrain Football Association) Al-Muharraq
10	MF	Saleh Al-Shaban	31 December 1999 (aged 21)	(Bahrain Football Association) Al-Riffa
11	MF	Adnan Fawaz	30 October 1999 (aged 21)	(Bahrain Football Association) Al-Riffa
12	MF	Sayed Jawad Alawi	7 January 2002 (aged 19)	(Bahrain Football Association) Al-Malkiya
13	MF	Yunes Moosa		(Bahrain Football Association) Al-Khaldiya
14	DF	Husain Abdulkarim		(Bahrain Football Association) Isa Town
15	MF	Omar Al-Shammari		(Bahrain Football Association) Al-Budaiya
16	DF	Fahad Jasim		(Bahrain Football Association) Al-Hala
17	DF	Hamad Fuad	24 February 2000 (aged 21)	(Bahrain Football Association) Al-Riffa
19	MF	Abdulla Al-Hayki	22 August 2000 (aged 21)	(Bahrain Football Association) Al-Muharraq
21	GK	Abdullah Al-Ahmed	9 April 2003 (aged 18)	(Bahrain Football Association) Al-Riffa
22	GK	Ali Khalifa	12 October 1999 (aged 21)	(Bahrain Football Association) Al-Hidd
23	DF	Hamza Al-Juban	17 April 2000 (aged 21)	(Bahrain Football Association) Al-Muharraq
25	DF	Mohammed Abdul Qayoom	4 July 2001 (aged 20)	(Bahrain Football Association) Al-Riffa
27	FW	Ebrahim Al-Khatal		(Bahrain Football Association) Qalali
30	GK	Mohamed Marhoon	25 July 2000 (aged 21)	(Bahrain Football Association) Al-Malkiya
34	MF	Faisal Saeed		(Bahrain Football Association) Al-Bahrain

=== Saudi Arabia ===
Coach: Saad Al-Shehri

The squad was announced on 29 September 2021.

No.	Pos.	Player	Date of birth (age)	Club
1	GK	Nawaf Al-Aqidi	10 May 2000 (aged 21)	(Saudi Arabian Football Federation) Al-Nassr
2	DF	Nawaf Boushal	16 September 1999 (aged 22)	(Saudi Arabian Football Federation) Al-Fateh
3	DF	Waleed Al-Ahmed	3 May 1999 (aged 22)	(Saudi Arabian Football Federation) Al-Faisaly
4	DF	Khalifah Al-Dawsari	2 January 1999 (aged 22)	(Saudi Arabian Football Federation) Al-Hilal
5	DF	Jehad Thakri	1 January 2002 (aged 19)	(Saudi Arabian Football Federation) Al-Qadsiah
6	MF	Ibrahim Mahnashi	18 November 1999 (aged 21)	(Saudi Arabian Football Federation) Al-Ettifaq
7	FW	Abdullah Radif	20 January 2003 (aged 18)	(Saudi Arabian Football Federation) Al-Hilal
8	MF	Hamed Al-Ghamdi	2 April 1999 (aged 22)	(Saudi Arabian Football Federation) Al-Ettifaq
9	FW	**Abdullah Al-Hamdan**	12 September 1999 (aged 22)	(Saudi Arabian Football Federation) Al-Hilal
10	MF	**Turki Al-Ammar**	24 September 1999 (aged 22)	(Saudi Arabian Football Federation) Al-Shabab
11	MF	Khalid Al-Ghannam	7 November 2000 (aged 20)	(Saudi Arabian Football Federation) Al-Nassr
12	DF	Moteb Al-Harbi	19 February 2000 (aged 21)	(Saudi Arabian Football Federation) Al-Shabab
13	DF	Hamad Al-Yami	17 May 1999 (aged 22)	(Saudi Arabian Football Federation) Al-Hilal
14	MF	Mansor Al-Beshe	24 April 2000 (aged 21)	(Saudi Arabian Football Federation) Al-Raed
15	MF	Hussain Al-Eisa	29 December 2000 (aged 20)	(Saudi Arabian Football Federation) Al-Batin
16	FW	Mohammed Maran	15 February 2001 (aged 20)	(Saudi Arabian Football Federation) Al-Nassr
17	MF	Bader Munshi	20 June 1999 (aged 22)	(Saudi Arabian Football Federation) Damac
18	FW	Haitham Asiri	25 March 2001 (aged 20)	(Saudi Arabian Football Federation) Al-Ahli
19	MF	Meshal Al-Sebyani	11 April 2001 (aged 20)	(Saudi Arabian Football Federation) Al-Faisaly
20	DF	Muhannad Al-Shanqeeti	12 March 1999 (aged 22)	(Saudi Arabian Football Federation) Al-Ittihad
21	GK	Abdulrahman Al-Sanbi	3 February 2001 (aged 20)	(Saudi Arabian Football Federation) Al-Ahli
22	GK	Abdulrahman Al-Shammari	9 July 2000 (aged 21)	(Saudi Arabian Football Federation) Najran
23	MF	Abdulmohsen Al-Qahtani	5 June 1999 (aged 22)	(Saudi Arabian Football Federation) Al-Raed

=== Syria ===
Coach: Rafat Muhammad

The squad was announced on 2 October 2021.

No.	Pos.	Player	Date of birth (age)	Club
1	GK	Anas Al Bitar	1 January 2000 (aged 21)	(Syrian Football Association) Al-Wathba
2	DF	Mohammad Alian		(Kuwait Football Association) Al-Nasr
3	MF	Diaa Alhaq Mohammad	1 January 1999 (aged 22)	(Syrian Football Association) Al-Wahda
4	DF	Rami Al Turk		(Syrian Football Association) Al-Jaish
5	DF	Yosief Mohammad	27 June 1999 (aged 22)	(Bahrain Football Association) Al-Ahli
6	MF	Abduljawad Al Bitar	1 January 2000 (aged 21)	(Syrian Football Association) Al-Wathba
7	MF	Mustafa Juned		(Syrian Football Association) Hutteen
8	MF	Amin Akil	9 February 1999 (aged 22)	(Syrian Football Association) Al-Wahda
9	FW	Abdulhadi Shalha	19 January 1999 (aged 22)	(Syrian Football Association) Al-Wahda
10	FW	Mohamad Al Hallak	1 January 1999 (aged 22)	(Bahrain Football Association) Al-Manama
11	MF	Ali Bashmani	17 January 2000 (aged 21)	(Syrian Football Association) Tishreen
12	MF	Majd Al Ghayeb		(Syrian Football Association) Al-Shorta
13	MF	Ahmad Al Dali	21 March 2002 (aged 19)	(Syrian Football Association) Tishreen
14	DF	Allaith Mohammad	18 May 2000 (aged 21)	(Syrian Football Association) Tishreen
15	DF	Hafez Mohammad	1 January 2002 (aged 19)	(Brazilian Football Confederation) Pérolas Negras
16	MF	Ahmad Al Khassi	27 April 1999 (aged 22)	(Syrian Football Association) Al-Jaish
17	DF	Abdulhadi Hanbazly		(Syrian Football Association) Al-Taliya
18	FW	Abdulrazzak Bustani	1 January 1999 (aged 22)	(Syrian Football Association) Al-Wathba
19	MF	Fawaz Bawadkji		(Syrian Football Association) Al-Ittihad
20	FW	Yahya Al Karak		(Syrian Football Association) Al-Wahda
21	MF	**Mohamad Rihanieh**	1 January 2001 (aged 20)	(Syrian Football Association) Al-Ittihad
22	GK	Abdulbaset Bustani		(Syrian Football Association) Al-Hurriya
23	GK	Abdulla Mahawosh		(Kuwait Football Association) Al-Kuwait
