= 2025 AGCFF U-23 Gulf Cup =

كأس الخليج العربي تحت 23 سنة 2025 (in Arabic)

Tournament details
- Host country: Qatar
- Dates: 4–16 December
- Teams: 8 (from 1 confederation)
- Venues: 3 (in 2 host cities)

Final positions
- Champions: Saudi Arabia (5th title)
- Runners-up: Iraq

Tournament statistics
- Matches played: 15
- Goals scored: 35 (2.33 per match)
- Top scorer(s): (Saudi Arabia) Thamer Al-Khaibari (Qatar) Mostafa El-Sayed (3 goals each)
- Best player: (Saudi Arabia) Abdulaziz Al-Aliwa
- Best goalkeeper: (Saudi Arabia) Hamed Abdullah

The 2025 AGCFF U-23 Gulf Cup is the eighth edition of the AGCFF U-23 Gulf Cup, the tournament will be held in Doha, the capital of Qatar, from 4 December 2025 to 16 December 2025.

== Draw ==
| Group 1 | Group 2 |
|---|---|
| Kuwait; Qatar; Saudi Arabia; Bahrain | Iraq; Oman; United Arab Emirates; Yemen |

== Group stage ==
=== Group A ===
| Pos | Team | Pld | W | D | L | GF | GA | GD | Pts | Qualification |
|---|---|---|---|---|---|---|---|---|---|---|
| 1 | Saudi Arabia | 3 | 2 | 1 | 0 | 7 | 1 | +6 | 7 | Advance to the knockout stage |
| 2 | Qatar (H) | 3 | 2 | 1 | 0 | 5 | 1 | +4 | 7 | Advance to the knockout stage |
| 3 | Kuwait | 3 | 1 | 0 | 2 | 2 | 5 | −3 | 3 | |
| 4 | Bahrain | 3 | 0 | 0 | 3 | 1 | 7 | −6 | 0 | |

Source: 365scores
(H) Hosts
5 December 2025
14:45

| Qatar | 3–0 | Kuwait |
|---|---|---|
| El Sayed 3'; Surag 36'; A. Reyed 45+1' | Report |

Aspire Zone (pitch 2), Al Rayyan
Referee: Yahya Al-Balushi (Oman)
5 December 2025
15:00

| Saudi Arabia | 5–0 | Bahrain |
|---|---|---|
| Al-Aliwa 51', 83'; Majed 55'; Al-Khaibari 90+4'; Matuq 90+6' | Report |

Aspire Zone (pitch 1), Al Rayyan
Referee: Mohammed Al-Harmoudi (Arab Emirates)

8 December 2025
14:45

| Kuwait | 0–1 | Saudi Arabia |
|---|---|---|
| | Report | Radif 61' |

Aspire Zone (pitch 1), Al Rayyan
Referee: Mohammed Abdulhakim Ba-Saleh (Yemen)
8 December 2025
15:00

| Bahrain | 0–1 | Qatar |
|---|---|---|
| | Report | El Sayed 90+4' |

Aspire Zone (pitch 2), Al Rayyan
Referee: Ahmed Kazem (Iraq)

11 December 2025
13:30

| Bahrain | 1–2 | Kuwait |
|---|---|---|
| Al–Dosari 67' | Report | A. Boodai 14'; Montaser 30' (pen.) |

Aspire Zone (pitch 2), Al Rayyan
Referee: Ali Hussein Doshi (Iraq)
11 December 2025
13:30

| Qatar | 1–1 | Saudi Arabia |
|---|---|---|
| El Sayed 42' | Report | Al-Khaibari 85' |

Aspire Zone (pitch 1), Al Rayyan
Referee: Mohammed Al-Harmoudi (Arab Emirates)

=== Group B ===
| Pos | Team | Pld | W | D | L | GF | GA | GD | Pts | Qualification |
|---|---|---|---|---|---|---|---|---|---|---|
| 1 | Iraq | 3 | 2 | 0 | 1 | 4 | 2 | +2 | 6 | Advance to the knockout stage |
| 2 | United Arab Emirates | 3 | 2 | 0 | 1 | 5 | 2 | +3 | 6 | Advance to the knockout stage |
| 3 | Yemen | 3 | 1 | 1 | 1 | 4 | 5 | −1 | 4 | |
| 4 | Oman | 3 | 0 | 1 | 2 | 1 | 5 | −4 | 1 | |

Source: 365scores
4 December 2025
14:45

| Iraq | 1–2 | Yemen |
|---|---|---|
| M. Mousa 45+1' | Report | Abdulnabi 29', 38' |

Aspire Zone (pitch 2), Al Rayyan
Referee: Abdul Hadi Al-Ruwaili (Qatar)
4 December 2025
15:00

| United Arab Emirates | 2–0 | Oman |
|---|---|---|
| Al-Menhali 32' (pen.), 71' (pen.) | Report |

Aspire Zone (pitch 1), Al Rayyan
Referee: Mohamed Al-Smaail (Saudi Arabia)

7 December 2025
14:45

| Yemen | 1–3 | United Arab Emirates |
|---|---|---|
| Hamida 45+2' | Report | Al–Maamari 57'; Al-Menhali 63'; Hazim 90+3' |

Aspire Zone (pitch 1), Al Rayyan
Referee: Saud Al-Samhan (Kuwait)
7 December 2025
15:00

| Oman | 0–2 | Iraq |
|---|---|---|
| | Report | Amoori 50' (pen.); A. Luay 82' |

Aspire Zone (pitch 2), Al Rayyan
Referee: Ismail Habib (Bahrain)

10 December 2025
15:00

| Oman | 1–1 | Yemen |
|---|---|---|
| Al-Mashaiki 33' | Report | F. Maroof 33' |

Aspire Zone (pitch 2), Al Rayyan
Referee: Abdul Hadi Al-Ruwaili (Qatar)
10 December 2025
15:00

| Iraq | 1–0 | United Arab Emirates |
|---|---|---|
| Aiad 51' | Report |

Aspire Zone (pitch 1), Al Rayyan
Referee: Mohamed Al-Smaail (Saudi Arabia)

== Knockout stage ==
Semi-finals
14 December – Al Rayyan
United Arab Emirates | 0
Saudi Arabia | 2
14 December – Al Rayyan
Iraq (p) | 1 (7)
Qatar | 1 (6)

Final
16 December – Doha
Saudi Arabia | 2
Iraq | 0

=== Semi-finals ===
14 December 2025
14:45

| Saudi Arabia | 2–0 | United Arab Emirates |
|---|---|---|
| Radif 33'; Al-Khaibari 90' | Report |

Aspire Zone (pitch 1), Al Rayyan
Referee: Saud Al-Samhan (Kuwait)

14 December 2025
15:00

| Qatar | 1–1 | Iraq |
|---|---|---|
| Al-Abdulla 83' | Report | Amoori 11' (pen.) |
Penalties
| M. Hamza (penalty scored); Gamer (penalty scored); Reyed (penalty scored); Abdulaziz (penalty scored); Al-Abdulla (penalty scored); Marwan (penalty scored); El Sayed (penalty missed) | 6–7 | (penalty scored) Amoori; (penalty scored) Al-Imam; (penalty scored) Fadhil; (penalty scored) Sajjad; (penalty scored) A. Qasim; (penalty scored) Raad; (penalty scored) Abdulkareem |

Aspire Zone (pitch 2), Al Rayyan
Referee: Yahya Al-Balushi (Oman)

== Final ==
16 December 2025
17:00

| Saudi Arabia | 2–0 | Iraq |
|---|---|---|
| Al-Ghamdi 23'; Al-Aliwa 49' | Report |

Stadium 974, Doha
Referee: Ismail Habib (Bahrain)

== Winners ==
2025 GCC U-23 Championship champion

Saudi Arabia
Fifth title
