= Iraq national under-23 football team =

Iraq U-23
- Nickname(s): Usood al-Rafidayn (Lions of Mesopotamia)
- Association: IFA
- Confederation: AFC (Asia)
- Sub-confederation: WAFF (West Asia)
- Head coach: Emad Mohammed
- FIFA code: IRQ
First colours	Second colours	Third colours

First international
- Qatar 0–0 Iraq (Doha, Qatar; 22 September 1995)

Biggest win
- Iraq 13–0 Macau (Kuwait City, Kuwait; 6 September 2023)

Biggest defeat
- Jordan 5–0 Iraq (Amman, Jordan; 10 July 1999)

Summer Olympics
- Appearances: 3
- Best result: Fourth place (2004)

Asian Games
- Appearances: 2
- Best result: Silver medalists (2006)

AFC U-23 Asian Cup
- Appearances: 7
- Best result: Champions (2013)

WAFF U-23 Championship
- Appearances: 3
- Best result: Champions (2023)
- Website: Website

The Iraq national under-23 football team represents Iraq in international under-23 football. Iraq's major honors include winning the 2013 AFC U-22 Championship and the 2023 WAFF U-23 Championship. Other notable achievements include reaching fourth place in the 2004 Olympic Games, being silver medalists in the 2006 Asian Games and the 2025 AGCFF U-23 Gulf Cup, and bronze medalists in both the 2016 and 2024 AFC U-23 Asian Cup and the 2014 Asian Games.

== Honours ==
=== Continental ===
- AFC U-23 Asian Cup

(gold) Champions (1): 2013
(bronze) Third place (2): 2016, 2024

=== Regional ===
- WAFF U-23 Championship

(gold) Champions (1): 2023

- Asian Games

(silver) Silver medalists (1): 2006
(bronze) Bronze medalists (1): 2014

- GFF U-23 Gulf Cup

(silver) Silver medalists (1): 2025

== History ==
=== Summer Olympics ===
==== 2004 Athens Olympics ====
After 16 years without participation, Iraq qualified for the 2004 Summer Olympics after winning the 2004 Olympic Asian Qualifiers under head coach Adnan Hamad and were scheduled to play against Costa Rica, Morocco and Portugal in the group stages. At the Olympics Iraq started with a shocking 4–2 win against Portugal. That was followed by a 2–0 win against Costa Rica and a 2–1 loss to Morocco. The quarter-finals saw them beat Australia 1–0, and in the semi-final against Paraguay, Iraq lost 3–1. In the bronze medal match, Iraq lost 1–0 to Italy and finished fourth.

==== 2016 Rio Olympics ====
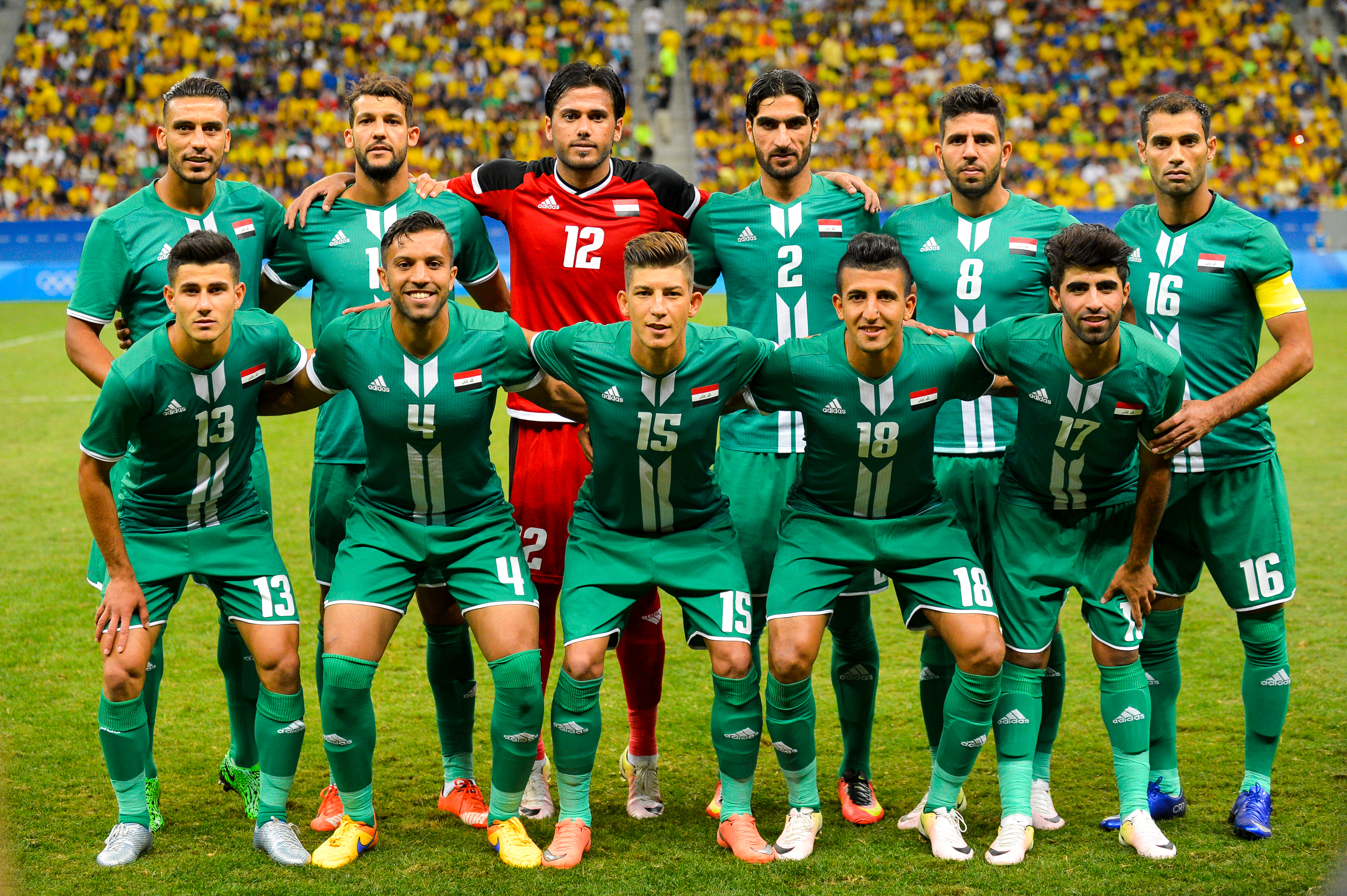
Iraq line-up before a match with Brazil at the 2016 Rio Olympics

Iraq qualified for the 2016 Olympics by clinching third place at the 2016 AFC U-23 Championship. The first game saw Iraq play against Denmark, and the score turned out as a 0–0 draw, despite Iraq having 18 shots in the match. The second game was played against the hosts and pre-tournament favourites, Brazil, which also ended up as a 0–0 draw, which was hailed as a great result for Iraq. In the third game, Iraq tied South Africa 1–1, despite having a huge 29 shots in the match. This result, coupled with Denmark's defeat to Brazil, saw Iraq get eliminated at the group stage. Brazil eventually went on to win the tournament.

=== AFC U-23 Asian Cup ===
==== 2013 AFC U-22 Championship ====
Iraq's first major honour on U-23 level was the 2013 AFC U-22 Championship. The tournament started with a 3–1 win against Saudi Arabia. That was followed by a 2–1 win against Uzbekistan and a 1–0 win against China. The quarter-finals saw them beat Japan 1–0, and the semi-final against favourites Korea Republic with another 1–0 win.

The final was against local rivals Saudi Arabia, and Mohannad Abdul-Raheem scored the only goal to win the tournament for Iraq. This victory secured Iraq's first Asian Cup U-23 title. Amjad Kalaf was named the most valuable player of the tournament.

==== 2016 AFC U-23 Championship ====
The 2016 AFC U-23 Championship final tournament is to be held in Qatar from 12–30 January 2016. Iraq qualified for the tournament by topping the group in the qualification stage in Oman in March 2015.

Iraq advanced from the group stage, beating Yemen 2–0, Uzbekistan 3–2, and a 1–1 tie with South Korea. In the quarterfinals, Iraq beat UAE 3–1 in extra time to progress to the semifinals. Iraq lost 2–1 to Japan.

In the third place match, Iraq came back from behind to beat Qatar 2–1 to qualify for 2016 Olympics.

==== 2018 AFC U-23 Championship ====
Iraq qualified for the 3rd tournament by topping the group in the qualification stage in Saudi Arabia in July 2017.

In the final tournament, with the defending champion Japan not bringing their strongest squad and South Korea fielded a relatively inexperienced squad, Iraq had many chances to repeat 2013 success. In the group stage, they finished at the top of the group after beating Malaysia 4–1 and Jordan 1–0, with a 0–0 draw against Saudi Arabia. Iraq advanced into the quarter-final as the first seed of group C and was scheduled to face off against Vietnam, which was widely regarded to be Iraq's easiest ever opponent in this stage, boosting the enthusiasm among Iraqis. However, thing didn't go as planned, which an unexpected 3–3 draw after extra time meant that the result would be settled via a penalty shoot-out, in which Vietnam emerged victorious with the score of 5–3, thus eliminating Iraq from the tournament in the shock of its supporters.

==== 2020 AFC U-23 Championship ====
Iraq qualified for the tournament by topping the group in the qualification stage in Iran in March 2019.

In the final tournament held in Thailand, Iraq was grouped in group A together with host Thailand, a resurgence Australia and the unknown Bahrain. For the first time, Iraq did not make it out of the group stage, drawing all three games.

==== 2022 AFC U-23 Asian Cup ====
Iraq were drawn with Jordan, Australia and Kuwait.

Iraq pulled back the equaliser through Wakaa Ramadan to draw with Jordan 1-1 in the opening matchday, before drawing again to a 10-man Australia side through a Hasan Abdulkareem volley cancelling out a scorpion kick goal scored by Alou Kuol. Needing a win to qualify for the quarter-finals, Iraq came back from a goal down to beat Kuwait 3-1 thanks to goals scored by Muntadher Mohammed, Moammel Abdulridha and Mohammed Al-Baqer.

Iraq qualified out of Group B as runner-up, only behind Australia, so they were drawn against the winner of Group A, hosts Uzbekistan. The game went to extra time and later, penalties. Merchas Doski and Ahmed Naeem converted their penalties while Uzbekistan's second penalty was saved by Hassan Ahmed. However, Wakaa Rammdan hit the post, Moammel Abdulridha had his tame penalty saved and Hasan Abdulkareem blazed his penalty over the bar, while Uzbekistan converted their last three penalties to win 3-2 on penalties and advance to the semi-finals.

==== 2024 AFC U-23 Asian Cup ====
Iraq were drawn into a group alongside Thailand, Tajikistan, and Saudi Arabia.

In the first match, Thailand emerged victorious with a stunning 2-0 win over Iraq. Iraq defeated Tajikistan and Saudi Arabia, securing their place as group winners. Iraq faced Vietnam in the quarterfinals, and in a fiercely contested match, booking their ticket to the semifinals. However, Iraq succumbed to a 2-0 defeat against Japan in the semifinals.

In the playoff for third place, Iraq faced Indonesia in a showdown for bronze. Iraq emerged victorious, securing a 2-1 win and clinched third place in the tournament. This also earned them a spot in the 2024 Olympics. On the individual front, Ali Jasim finished as the top scorer of the tournament with four goals and two assists.

== Recent results and fixtures ==
- The following is a list of match results in the last 12 months, as well as any future matches that have been scheduled.

Legend

Win Draw Lose

=== 2025 ===
4 December 2025 2025 AGCFF U-23 Gulf Cup	Iraq	1–2	Yemen	Al Rayyan
14:45	M. Mousa 45+1'	Report	Abdulnabi 29', 38'	Stadium: Aspire Zone (pitch 2)

7 December 2025 2025 AGCFF U-23 Gulf Cup	Oman	0–2	Iraq	Al Rayyan
15:00		Report	Amoori 50' (pen.); A. Luay 82'	Stadium: Aspire Zone (pitch 2)

10 December 2025 2025 AGCFF U-23 Gulf Cup	Iraq	1–0	United Arab Emirates	Al Rayyan
15:00	Aiad 51'	Report		Stadium: Aspire Zone (pitch 2)

14 December 2025 2025 AGCFF U-23 Gulf Cup	Iraq	1–1 (7–6 p)	Qatar	Al Rayyan
15:00	Amoori 11' (pen.)	Report	Al-Abdulla 83'	Stadium: Aspire Zone (pitch 2)

16 December 2025 2025 AGCFF U-23 Gulf Cup	Saudi Arabia	2–0	Iraq	Doha
17:00	Al-Ghamdi 23'; Al-Aliwa 49'	Report		Stadium: Stadium 974

=== 2026 ===
9 January 2026 2026 AFC U-23 Asian Cup	Iraq	0–0	China	Riyadh
17:00		Report		Stadium: Prince Faisal bin Fahd Sports City Stadium; Attendance: 960; Referee: Asker Nadjafaliev (Uzbekistan)

12 January 2026 2026 AFC U-23 Asian Cup	Thailand	1–1	Iraq	Riyadh
17:00	Chinngoen 85'	Report	Faisal 27' (pen.)	Stadium: Prince Faisal bin Fahd Sports City Stadium; Attendance: 144; Referee: Yahya Al-Mulla (United Arab Emirates)

15 January 2026 2026 AFC U-23 Asian Cup	Iraq	1–2	Australia	Riyadh
14:30	Faisal 63' (pen.)	Report	Dukuly 90+3'; Macallister 90+7'	Stadium: Prince Faisal bin Fahd Sports City Stadium; Attendance: 183; Referee: Abdullah Jamali (Kuwait)

5 June 2026 Friendly	Russia	5–1	Iraq

9 June 2026 Friendly	Russia	1–0	Iraq

25 September 2026 Friendly	Serbia	3–0	Iraq

28 September 2026 Friendly	Serbia	3–0	Iraq

14 November 2026 Friendly	Iraq	1–1	Lebanon	Nasiriyah, Iraq
18:00 UTC+3	54' (pen.)	Report	Salami 41' (pen.)	Stadium: Al-Nasiriya International Stadium

17 November 2026 Friendly	Iraq	4–1	Lebanon	Nasiriyah, Iraq
16:00 UTC+3	5'; 16'; 53'; 90+5'	Report	Salami 51'	Stadium: Al-Nasiriya International Stadium

== Coaching staff ==
Position	Name
Head coach	(Iraq) Emad Mohammed
Assistant coach	(Iraq) Haidar Abdul-Amir
Goalkeeping coach	Nouri Abd Zaid
Fitness coach	Vacant
Match analyst	Montazer Mujbil
Physiotherapist	(Tunisia) Brahim Boubaker (Tunisia) Marouan Slim
Chief medical officer	(Tunisia) Mokhtar Chaabane
Team doctor	(Tunisia) Mourad Mokrani
Team manager	(Iraq) Mustafa Jalal
Media coordinator	(Iraq) Salam Al-Manaseer
Security coordinator	(Iraq) Samed Abu Jaber
Kitman	(Iraq) Abdallah Al-Mahmoudi

== Players ==
=== Current squad ===
The following 26 players have been called up for the friendly matches against Serbia on 25 and 28 September.
Caps and goals correct as of 9 September 2025 after game against Cambodia

No.	Pos.	Player	Date of birth (age)	Caps	Goals	Club
	GK	Zac Hadi	13 February 2006 (age 20)	0	0	(The Football Association) Bradford City
	GK	Sajjad Mohammed		0	0	(Iraq Football Association) Al-Talaba
	GK	Sajjad Nihad	1 January 2005 (age 21)	0	0	(Iraq Football Association) Amanat Baghdad
	DF	Mohammed Ghaleb	26 September 2005 (aged 18)	3	0	(Iraq Football Association) Al-Minaa
	DF	Muslim Mousa	11 March 2005 (age 21)	2	0	(Iraq Football Association) Al-Minaa
	DF	Adam Rasheed	10 July 2006 (age 20)	4	0	(Iraq Football Association) Al-Shorta
	DF	Abbas Adnan	1 January 2005 (age 21)	0	0	(Iraq Football Association) Al-Kahrabaa
	DF	Hussein Fahim	6 April 2006 (age 20)	3	0	(Iraq Football Association) Al-Karkh
	DF	Muqtada Saad		0	0	(Iraq Football Association) Al-Gharraf
	DF	Adham Qais		0	0	(Iraq Football Association) Al-Kahrabaa
	DF	Hassan Emad	1 April 2005 (age 21)	0	0	(Iraq Football Association) Duhok
	DF	Karrar Ali	21 September 2004 (age 22)	1	0	(Iraq Football Association) Al-Qasim
	MF	Amir Faisal	1 May 2005 (age 21)	3	1	(Iraq Football Association) Al-Karma
	MF	Ali Mokhalad	7 February 2006 (age 20)	2	0	(Iraq Football Association) Al-Karma
	MF	Abbas Fadhil	13 July 2003 (age 23)	3	0	(Iraq Football Association) Naft Maysan
	MF	Layth Dheyaa	7 June 2005 (age 21)	0	0	(Iraq Football Association) Al-Gharraf
	MF	Ali Al-Najar	23 January 2008 (age 18)	0	0	(Danish Football Association) Brøndby IF
	MF	Saif Firas	6 October 2006 (age 20)	0	0	(Iraq Football Association) Al-Zawraa
	MF	Karrar Jaafar	29 July 2006 (age 20)	1	0	(Iraq Football Association) Al-Minaa
	MF	Hayder Hamad	16 November 2005 (age 21)	0	0	(Iraq Football Association) Al-Nasiriya
	MF	Abdul Faisal	27 October 2005 (age 21)	0	0	(Iraq Football Association) Al-Gharraf
	MF	Moamel Mahmoud	22 February 2005 (age 21)	0	0	(Iraq Football Association) Al-Kahrabaa
	MF	Zainulabdeen Jassim	5 August 2008 (age 18)	0	0	(Iraq Football Association) Al-Minaa
	FW	Dhulfiqar Younis	2 September 2004 (age 22)	3	3	(Iraq Football Association) Erbil
	FW	Mustafa Qabeel	8 January 2005 (age 21)	3	1	(Iraq Football Association) Erbil
	FW	Ali Akbar Taher	30 December 2006 (age 19)	0	0	(Iraq Football Association) Al-Quwa Al-Jawiya

=== Recent call-ups ===
The following players have been called up within 12 months

Pos.	Player	Date of birth (age)	Caps	Goals	Club	Latest call-up
GK	Kumel Al-Rekabe	19 August 2004 (age 22)	10	0	(Iraq) Duhok	2026 AFC U-23 Asian Cup
GK	Hussein Hassan	15 November 2002 (age 24)	13	0	(Iraq) Erbil	2026 AFC U-23 Asian Cup
GK	Wissam Ali	27 May 2005 (age 21)	0	0	(Iraq) Amanat Baghdad	2026 AFC U-23 Asian Cup
GK	Laith Sajid	17 September 2005 (age 21)	0	0	(Iraq) Al-Karma	2025 AGCFF U-23 Gulf Cup
DF	Kadhim Raad	5 March 2003 (age 23)	1	0	(Iraq) Al-Zawraa	2026 AFC U-23 Asian Cup
DF	Josef Al-Imam	27 July 2004 (age 22)	19	0	(Iraq) Duhok	2026 AFC U-23 Asian Cup
DF	Sajjad Mohammed Mahdi	25 February 2003 (age 23)	1	0	(Iraq) Al-Zawraa	2026 AFC U-23 Asian Cup
DF	Hamid Ali	25 September 2004 (age 22)	0	0	(Iraq) Zakho	2026 AFC U-23 Asian Cup
DF	Yasir Wisam	3 March 2007 (age 19)	0	0	(Iraq) Al-Zawraa	2026 AFC U-23 Asian Cup
MF	Mohammed Jameel Shinaa	25 November 2005 (age 20)	0	0	(Iraq) Al-Hudood	2026 AFC U-23 Asian Cup
MF	Ahmed Aied		3	2	(Iraq) Al-Kahrabaa	2026 AFC U-23 Asian Cup
MF	Mustafa Nawafa Zai	5 May 2005 (age 21)	1	0	(Iraq) Duhok	2026 AFC U-23 Asian Cup
MF	Ali Sadiq	13 February 2003 (age 23)	3	1	(Iraq) Diyala	2026 AFC U-23 Asian Cup
MF	Abdulrazzaq Qasim	19 February 2003 (age 23)	3	0	(Iraq) Al-Shorta	2026 AFC U-23 Asian Cup
MF	Hayder Abdulkareem	7 August 2004 (age 22)	1	0	(Saudi Arabia) Al-Nassr	2026 AFC U-23 Asian Cup
MF	Ali Shakhwan	30 September 2002 (age 24)	0	0	(Iraq) Erbil	2025 AGCFF U-23 Gulf Cup
FW	Ayman Luay	23 May 2005 (age 21)	0	0	(Iraq) Al-Minaa	2026 AFC U-23 Asian Cup
FW	Hussein Naeem	22 August 2003 (age 23)	0	0	(Iraq) Al-Talaba	2025 AGCFF U-23 Gulf Cup
^{PRE} Part of the preliminary squad^{INJ} Player injured^{CLB} Player refused by club or unable to attend due to club commitments^{IRQ} Player moved up to the first team^{OVR} Player overaged and ineligible to represent this age group^{WD} Player withdrew for non-injury related reasons

=== Previous squads ===
Bold indicates winning squads

Olympic Games

- 2004 Summer Olympics Squad
- 2016 Summer Olympics Squad
- 2024 Summer Olympics Squad

AFC U-23 Asian Cup

- **2013 AFC U-22 Championship Squad**
- 2016 AFC U-23 Championship Squad
- 2018 AFC U-23 Championship Squad
- 2020 AFC U-23 Championship Squad
- 2022 AFC U-23 Asian Cup Squad
- 2024 AFC U-23 Asian Cup Squad
- 2026 AFC U-23 Asian Cup Squad

Asian Games

- 2006 Asian Games Squad
- 2014 Asian Games Squad

WAFF U-23 Championship

- 2021 WAFF U-23 Championship Squad
- 2023 WAFF U-23 Championship Squad
- 2024 WAFF U-23 Championship Squad

=== Overage players ===
Football at the Summer Olympics, the Asian Games and the Islamic Solidarity Games have required that under-23 players enter the competitions, but they have allowed three overage players to be included in one squad. These three players are called the "wild cards".

==== Summer Olympics ====
Tournament	Player 1	Player 2	Player 3
2004	Haidar Abdul-Jabar (DF)	Abdul-Wahab Abu Al-Hail (MF)	Razzaq Farhan (FW)
2016	Ahmed Ibrahim (DF)	Saad Abdul-Amir (MF)	Hammadi Ahmed (FW)
2024	Saad Natiq (DF)	Ibrahim Bayesh (MF)	Aymen Hussein (FW)

==== Asian Games ====
Tournament	Player 1	Player 2	Player 3
2014	Salam Shaker (DF)	Mahdi Karim (MF)	Younis Mahmoud (FW)

==== Islamic Solidarity Games ====
Tournament	Player 1	Player 2	Player 3
2013	Hussein Abdul-Wahid (MF)	Luay Salah (FW)	Marwan Abbas Fadhel (FW)

== Manager history ==
As of 22 November 2026

Caretaker manager

No.	Manager	Year	P	W	D	L	Win %	Competition(s)
1	(England) William Asprey	1989–1990	6	5	1	0	83.33	Stafford Challenge Cup champion
2	(Iraq) Anwar Jassam	1995–1996	11	5	3	3	45.45	
3	(Iraq) Nazar Ashraf	1999	12	6	4	2	50.00	
—	(Iraq) Najeh Humoud	2001	3	0	2	1	0.00	—
4	(Germany) Bernd Stange	2002–2003	5	3	1	1	60.00	
5	(Iraq) Adnan Hamad	2003–2004	25	13	4	8	52.00	2004 Summer Olympics fourth place 2003 Abha Championship champion
6	(Iraq) Yahya Alwan	2006–2007	45	26	13	6	57.78	2006 Asian Games silver medal
—	(Iraq) Nadhim Shaker	2011	4	2	1	1	50.00	—
7	(Iraq) Radhi Shenaishil	2011–2012	15	5	2	8	33.33	
8	(Iraq) Hakeem Shaker	2012	5	3	2	0	60.00	
—	(Iraq) Hadi Mutanash	2013	7	1	5	1	14.29	2013 Islamic Solidarity Games group stage
9	(Iraq) Hakeem Shaker	2014	19	15	2	2	78.95	2013 AFC U-22 Championship champion 2014 Asian Games bronze medal
10	(Iraq) Yahya Alwan	2015	7	6	1	0	85.71	
11	(Iraq) Abdul-Ghani Shahad	2015–2020	41	25	12	4	60.98	2016 AFC U-23 Championship third place 2016 Summer Olympics group stage 2018 AFC U-23 Championship quarter-finals 2020 AFC U-23 Championship group stage
12	(Czech Republic) Miroslav Soukup	2021–2022	15	7	5	3	46.67	2021 WAFF U-23 Championship semi-finals 2022 AFC U-23 Asian Cup quarter-finals
13	(Iraq) Radhi Shenaishil	2022–2024	31	18	5	8	58.06	2023 WAFF U-23 Championship champion 2024 AFC U-23 Asian Cup third place 2024 Summer Olympics group stage
—	(Iraq) Ehsan Turki	2024	3	0	1	2	0.00	2024 WAFF U-23 Championship sixth place
14	(Iraq) Emad Mohammed	2025–	23	8	6	9	34.78	
Total			277	148	70	59	53.43	—

== Competitive record ==
Overview
Event	1st place	2nd place	3rd place	4th place
Summer Olympics	0	0	0	1
AFC U-23 Asian Cup	1	0	2	0
Total	1	0	2	1

=== Summer Olympics ===
Summer Olympics record										Qualification record					
Year	Result	Position	Pld	W	D	L	GF	GA	Squad	Pld	W	D	L	GF	GA
1900–1988	See Iraq national football team									See Iraq national football team					
(Spain) 1992	Did not enter									Did not enter					
(United States) 1996	Did not qualify									9	4	3	2	14	8
(Australia) 2000	Did not qualify									4	1	2	1	7	10
(Greece) 2004	Fourth place	4th	6	3	0	3	9	8	Squad	10	5	1	4	17	12
(China) 2008	Did not qualify									12	6	5	1	21	8
(United Kingdom) 2012	Did not qualify									8	3	2	3	7	7
(Brazil) 2016	Group stage	12th	3	0	3	0	1	1	Squad	10	7	2	1	27	11
(Japan) 2020	Did not qualify									6	2	4	0	11	4
(France) 2024	Group stage	10th	3	1	0	2	3	7	Squad	9	6	1	2	30	10
(United States) 2028	To be determined									To be determined					
(Australia) 2032	To be determined									To be determined					
Total	Best: Fourth place	3/9	12	4	3	5	13	16	—	68	34	20	14	134	70

- Prior to the Barcelona 1992 campaign, the Football at the Summer Olympics was open to full senior national teams.

Summer Olympics history
Year	Round	Score	Result	Goalscorers for Iraq
1900–1988
1900–1988	See Iraq national football team			
2004	Group stage			
2004	Group stage	Iraq 4–2 Portugal	Win	E. Mohammed 16', H. Mohammed 29'; Mahmoud 56', Sadir 90+3'
2004	Group stage	Iraq 2–0 Costa Rica	Win	H. Mohammed 67', M. Karim 72'
2004	Group stage	Iraq 1–2 Morocco	Loss	Sadir 63'
2004	Quarter-finals			
2004	Quarter-finals	Iraq 1–0 Australia	Win	E. Mohammed 64'
2004	Semi-finals			
2004	Semi-finals	Iraq 1–3 Paraguay	Loss	Farhan 83'
2004	Bronze medal			
2004	Bronze medal	Iraq 0–1 Italy	Loss	
2016	Group stage			
2016	Group stage	Iraq 0–0 Denmark	Draw	
2016	Group stage	Iraq 0–0 Brazil	Draw	
2016	Group stage	Iraq 1–1 South Africa	Draw	Abdul-Amir 14'
2024	Group stage			
2024	Group stage	Iraq 2–1 Ukraine	Win	A. Hussein 57' (pen.), A. Jasim 75'
2024	Group stage	Iraq 1–3 Argentina	Loss	A. Hussein 45+5'
2024	Group stage	Iraq 0–3 Morocco	Loss	

=== AFC U-23 Asian Cup ===
AFC U-23 Asian Cup record										Qualification record					
Year	Result	Position	GP	W	D*	L	GF	GA	Squad	GP	W	D	L	GF	GA
(Oman) 2013	Champions	1st	6	6	0	0	9	2	Squad	5	3	2	0	12	3
(Qatar) 2016	Third place	3rd	6	4	1	1	12	7	Squad	4	3	1	0	15	4
(China) 2018	Quarter-finals	6th	4	2	2	0	8	4	Squad	3	3	0	0	12	1
(Thailand) 2020	Group stage	10th	3	0	3	0	4	4	Squad	3	2	1	0	7	0
(Uzbekistan) 2022	Quarter-finals	6th	4	1	3	0	7	5	Squad	2	2	0	0	7	0
(Qatar) 2024	Third place	3rd	6	4	0	2	9	8	Squad	3	2	1	0	21	2
(Saudi Arabia) 2026	Group stage	12th	3	0	2	1	2	3	Squad	3	2	1	0	9	1
(Japan) 2028	To be determined									To be determined					
Total	Best: Champions	7/7	34	17	13	4	51	33	—	23	17	6	0	83	11

*Draws include knockout matches decided on penalty kicks.

AFC U-23 Asian Cup history
Year	Round	Score	Result	Goalscorers for Iraq
2013	Group stage			
2013	Group stage	Iraq 3–1 Saudi Arabia	Win	Ismail 36', M. Hussein 50', 69'
2013	Group stage	Iraq 2–1 Uzbekistan	Win	M. Hussein 10', Nadhim 38'
2013	Group stage	Iraq 1–0 China	Win	M. Hussein 14' (pen.)
2013	Quarterfinals			
2013	Quarterfinals	Iraq 1–0 Japan	Win	Kalaf 84'
2013	Semifinals			
2013	Semifinals	Iraq 1–0 South Korea	Win	Nadhim 74'
2013	Final			
2013	Final	Iraq 1–0 Saudi Arabia	Win	Abdul-Raheem 33'
2016	Group stage			
2016	Group stage	Iraq 2–0 Yemen	Win	Faez 36' (pen.), Husni 39'
2016	Group stage	Iraq 3–2 Uzbekistan	Win	Attwan 38', Kamil 43', Tariq 84'
2016	Group stage	Iraq 1–1 South Korea	Draw	Walid 90+2'
2016	Quarterfinals			
2016	Quarterfinals	Iraq 3–1 (a.e.t.) United Arab Emirates	Win	Husni 77', Abdul-Raheem 103', Walid 120+3'
2016	Semifinals			
2016	Semifinals	Iraq 1–2 Japan	Loss	S. Natiq 43'
2016	3rd Place			
2016	3rd Place	Iraq 2–1 (a.e.t.) Qatar	Win	Abdul-Raheem 86', A. Hussein 109'}
2018	Group stage			
2018	Group stage	Iraq 4–1 Malaysia	Win	Jaffal 5', Attwan 28', Mhawi 56', H. Ali 81'
2018	Group stage	Iraq 0–0 Saudi Arabia	Draw	
2018	Group stage	Iraq 1–0 Jordan	Win	Resan 49'
2018	Quarterfinals			
2018	Quarterfinals	Iraq 3–3 (a.e.t.)(pen 3-5) Vietnam	Draw	A. Hussein 29' (pen.), 94', Mhawi 116'
2020	Group stage			
2020	Group stage	Iraq 1–1 Australia	Draw	Nassif 77'
2020	Group stage	Iraq 2–2 Bahrain	Draw	Al-Ammari 65', Nassif 90+2'
2020	Group stage	Iraq 1–1 Thailand	Draw	Nassif 49'
2022	Group stage			
2022	Group stage	Iraq 1–1 Jordan	Draw	Ramadhan 69'
2022	Group stage	Iraq 1–1 Australia	Draw	Abdulkareem 56'
2022	Group stage	Iraq 3–1 Kuwait	Win	M. Mohammed 35', Abdulridha 59', Al-Baqer 82'
2022	Quarterfinals			
2022	Quarterfinals	Iraq 2–2 (a.e.t.)(pen 2-3) Uzbekistan	Draw	Ramadhan 19' (pen.), Ghaleb 68'
2024	Group stage			
2024	Group stage	Iraq 0–2 Thailand	Loss	
2024	Group stage	Iraq 4–2 Tajikistan	Win	M. Mohammed 14', A. Jasim 22' (pen.), Khalid 56', K. Saad 87'
2024	Group stage	Iraq 2–1 Saudi Arabia	Win	A. Jasim 45+1' (pen.), Saadoon 63'
2024	Quarterfinals			
2024	Quarterfinals	Iraq 1–0 Vietnam	Win	A. Jasim 64' (pen.)
2024	Semifinals			
2024	Semifinals	Iraq 0–2 Japan	Loss	
2024	3rd Place			
2024	3rd Place	Iraq 2–1 (a.e.t.) Indonesia	Win	Tahseen 27', A. Jasim 96'
2026	Group stage			
2026	Group stage	Iraq 0–0 China	Draw	
2026	Group stage	Iraq 1–1 Thailand	Draw	Faisal 27' (pen.)
2026	Group stage	Iraq 1–2 Australia	Loss	Faisal 63' (pen.)

=== Asian Games ===
Asian Games record
Year	Result	Position	GP	W	D*	L	GF	GA	Squad
1951–1998	See Iraq national football team								
(South Korea) 2002	Banned due to Gulf War								
(Qatar) 2006	Runners-up	2nd	9	6	1	2	17	3	Squad
(China) 2010	Did not enter								
(South Korea) 2014	Third place	3rd	7	6	0	1	18	4	Squad
(Indonesia) 2018	Withdrew								
(China) 2022	Did not enter								
(Japan) 2026	Withdrew								
Total	Best: Runners-up	2/7	16	12	1	3	35	7	—

*Draws include knockout matches decided on penalty kicks.

Asian Games history
Year	Round	Score	Result	Goalscorers for Iraq
1951–1998
1951–1998	See Iraq national football team			
2006	Round 1			
2006	Round 1	Iraq 6–0 Indonesia	Win	K. Jassim 18', Abid Ali 24', Karim 36' (pen.), 63', Mansour 82', Rehema 89'
2006	Round 1	Iraq 2–0 Singapore	Win	Karim 5', Mahmoud 7'
2006	Round 1	Iraq 0–0 Syria	Draw	
2006	Round 2			
2006	Round 2	Iraq 0–1 China	Loss	
2006	Round 2	Iraq 2–0 Oman	Win	Rehema 30', Abdul-Zahra 45+2'
2006	Round 2	Iraq 4–0 Malaysia	Win	Rehema 14', Mahmoud 54', 55', Karim 65'
2006	Quarterfinals			
2006	Quarterfinals	Iraq 2–1 (a.e.t.) Uzbekistan	Win	K. Jassim 10', Mansour 95'
2006	Semifinals			
2006	Semifinals	Iraq 1–0 South Korea	Win	S. Saeed 24'
2006	Final			
2006	Final	Iraq 0–1 Qatar	Loss	
2014	Group stage			
2014	Group stage	Iraq 4–0 Nepal	Win	Resan 24', Mahmoud 45+1', Chand 85' (o.g.), Bahjat 90+2'
2014	Group stage	Iraq 3–1 Japan	Win	Tariq 12', Adnan 48', 72'
2014	Group stage	Iraq 3–0 Kuwait	Win	Tariq 16', 62', M. Hussein 71'
2014	Round of 16			
2014	Round of 16	Iraq 4–2 Tajikistan	Win	Tariq 7', Shaker 47', Adnan 62', Nadhim 84'
2014	Quarterfinals			
2014	Quarterfinals	Iraq 3–0 Saudi Arabia	Win	Mahmoud 10', 29', Al-Shamekh 49' (o.g.)
2014	Semifinals			
2014	Semifinals	Iraq 0–1 (a.e.t.) North Korea	Loss	
2014	3rd Place			
2014	3rd Place	Iraq 1–0 Thailand	Win	Mahmoud 62'

=== GFF U-23 Gulf Cup ===
GFF U-23 Gulf Cup record
Year	Result	Position	GP	W	D	L	GF	GA	Squad
(Saudi Arabia) 2008 to (Qatar) 2016	Did not enter								
(Qatar) 2025	Runners-up	2nd	5	2	1	2	6	5	Squad
Total	Best: Runners-up	1/8	5	2	1	2	6	5	—

GFF U-23 Gulf Cup history
Year	Round	Score	Result	Goalscorers for Iraq
2025	Group stage			
2025	Group stage	Iraq 1–2 Yemen	Loss	Mousa 45+1'
2025	Group stage	Iraq 2–0 Oman	Win	Faisal 50' (pen.), Luay 82'
2025	Group stage	Iraq 1–0 United Arab Emirates	Win	Aiad 51'
2025	Semifinals			
2025	Semifinals	Iraq 1–1 (a.e.t.)(pen 7-6) Qatar	Draw	Faisal 11' (pen.)
2025	Final			
2025	Final	Iraq 0–2 Saudi Arabia	Loss	

=== WAFF U-23 Championship ===
WAFF U-23 Championship record
Year	Result	Position	GP	W	D	L	GF	GA	Squad
(Qatar) 2015	did not enter								
(Saudi Arabia) 2021	Semifinals	3rd	4	2	1	1	5	3	Squad
(Saudi Arabia) 2022	did not enter								
(Iraq) 2023	Champions	1st	4	2	2	0	7	3	Squad
(Saudi Arabia) 2024	Sixth place	6th	3	0	1	2	3	6	Squad
(Oman) 2025	did not enter								
Total	Best: Champions	3/5	11	4	4	3	15	12	—

WAFF U-23 Championship history
Year	Round	Score	Result	Goalscorers for Iraq
2021	Group stage			
2021	Group stage	Iraq 1–0 Palestine	Win	Abdulkareem 81'
2021	Group stage	Iraq 2–0 United Arab Emirates	Win	Zamel 41', Abdulameer 90+2'
2021	Group stage	Iraq 2–2 Lebanon	Draw	Iqbal 15', Sartip 55'
2021	Semifinals			
2021	Semifinals	Iraq 0–1 Saudi Arabia	Loss	
2023	Group stage			
2023	Group stage	Iraq 2–2 Jordan	Draw	B. Hassan 19', Abdullah 29'
2023	Group stage	Iraq 3–0 United Arab Emirates	Win	B. Hassan 26', Abdullah 73', Almosawe 87'
2023	Semifinals			
2023	Semifinals	Iraq 1–0 Oman	Win	Al-Rawahi 52' (o.g.)
2023	Final			
2023	Final	Iraq 1–1 (a.e.t.)(pen 5-4) Iran	Draw	Abdullah 45+3'
2024	Group stage			
2024	Group stage	Iraq 1–2 Australia	Loss	H. Jaafar 49'
2024	Classification semifinals			
2024	Classification semifinals	Iraq 1–1 (a.e.t.)(pen 4-3) United Arab Emirates	Draw	Sadiq 53'
2024	Fifth place play-off			
2024	Fifth place play-off	Iraq 1–3 Jordan	Loss	Bani Hani 52' (o.g.)

=== Islamic Solidarity Games ===
Islamic Solidarity Games record
Year	Result	Position	GP	W	D	L	GF	GA	Squad
(Saudi Arabia) 2005	did not enter								
(Iran) 2010	cancelled								
(Indonesia) 2013	Group stage	7th	3	0	2	1	4	5	Squad
(Azerbaijan) 2017 to (Turkey) 2021	did not enter								
Total	Best: Group stage	1/4	3	0	2	1	4	5	—

Islamic Solidarity Games history
Year	Round	Score	Result	Goalscorers for Iraq
2013	Group stage			
2013	Group stage	Iraq 2–3 Turkey	Loss	Kalaf 13', L. Salah 68'
2013	Group stage	Iraq 0–0 Syria	Draw	
2013	Group stage	Iraq 2–2 Saudi Arabia	Draw	Walid 48', Kalaf 54'

=== Exhibition Tournaments ===
Exhibition Tournaments
Tournament	Result	GP	W	D	L	GF	GA
(India) 1990 Stafford Cup	Champions	5	4	1	0	18	1
(Saudi Arabia) 2003 Abha Championship	Champions	6	4	2	0	14	7
(Jordan) 2008 Norway–Middle East U21 National Team Tournament	Champions	3	2	1	0	3	1
(United Arab Emirates) 2012 Matchworld Cup	Sixth place	3	1	0	2	3	4
(United Arab Emirates) 2022 Dubai Cup	Seventh place	3	1	1	1	3	3
(Qatar) 2023 Doha Cup	Fifth place	3	2	0	1	4	1

Exhibition Tournaments history
Year	Round	Score	Result	Goalscorers for Iraq
1990 Stafford Cup	Group stage			
1990 Stafford Cup	Group stage	Iraq 1–1 (India) HASC	Draw	Kadhim
1990 Stafford Cup	Group stage	Iraq 5–0 (India) Titanium FC	Win	H. Ali 46', H. Hadi 52', Makki 75', K. Muhsin 58', 80'
1990 Stafford Cup	Group stage	Iraq 2–0 (India) Indian Telephone Industries SC	Win	
1990 Stafford Cup	Semifinals			
1990 Stafford Cup	Semifinals	Iraq 8–0 (India) MGM SC	Win	
1990 Stafford Cup	Final			
1990 Stafford Cup	Final	Iraq 2–0 (India) Mahindra United FC	Win	Kadhim, Jeayer
2003 Abha Championship	Group stage			
2003 Abha Championship	Group stage	Iraq 1–0 Saudi Arabia	Win	Mnajed 32'
2003 Abha Championship	Group stage	Iraq 5–1 (Saudi Arabia) Al Nassr	Win	Mnajed 33', Mahmoud 35', 47', 58' (pen.), Sadir 60'
2003 Abha Championship	Group stage	Iraq 1–1 (Iran) Fajr Sepasi Shiraz	Draw	Q. Munir 67'
2003 Abha Championship	Group stage	Iraq 2–2 Senegal	Draw	Mahmoud 12', N. Akram 78' (pen.)
2003 Abha Championship	Semifinals			
2003 Abha Championship	Semifinals	Iraq 0–0 (a.e.t.) (4–3 p) Syria	Draw	
2003 Abha Championship	Final			
2003 Abha Championship	Final	Iraq 1–0 Morocco	Win	Mahmoud 81'
2008 Norway–Middle East U21 National Team Tournament	Round 1			
2008 Norway–Middle East U21 National Team Tournament	Round 1	Iraq 0–0 Jordan	Draw	
2008 Norway–Middle East U21 National Team Tournament	Round 2			
2008 Norway–Middle East U21 National Team Tournament	Round 2	Iraq 2–1 Norway	Win	Salah 48', Karim 72'
2008 Norway–Middle East U21 National Team Tournament	Round 3			
2008 Norway–Middle East U21 National Team Tournament	Round 3	Iraq 1–0 Syria	Win	Mohammed 62'
2012 Matchworld Cup	Group stage			
2012 Matchworld Cup	Group stage	Iraq 1–0 (Switzerland) Neuchâtel Xamax	Win	W. Salim 87' (pen.)
2012 Matchworld Cup	Group stage	Iraq 1–2 (Russia) Zenit St. Petersburg	Loss	Abdul-Raheem 59'
2012 Matchworld Cup	Fifth place play-off			
2012 Matchworld Cup	Fifth place play-off	Iraq 1–2 (Russia) Rostov	Loss	Abdul-Raheem 24'
2022 Dubai Cup	Round 1			
2022 Dubai Cup	Round 1	Iraq 0–0 Vietnam	Draw	
2022 Dubai Cup	Round 2			
2022 Dubai Cup	Round 2	Iraq 1–2 Saudi Arabia	Loss	Ghalib 44'
2022 Dubai Cup	Round 3			
2022 Dubai Cup	Round 3	Iraq 2–1 Thailand	Win	Aoraha 16', Ramadhan 90+5'
2023 Doha Cup	Round 1			
2023 Doha Cup	Round 1	Iraq 3–0 Vietnam	Win	Almosawe 45+1' (pen.), Maknzi 60', D. Younis 85'
2023 Doha Cup	Round 2			
2023 Doha Cup	Round 2	Iraq 0–1 South Korea	Loss	
2023 Doha Cup	Round 3			
2023 Doha Cup	Round 3	Iraq 1–0 Oman	Win	H. Abdullah 77'

== Honours ==
=== Intercontinental ===
- Summer Olympics

Fourth place: 2004

=== Continental ===
- AFC U-23 Asian Cup

Winners: 2013
Third place: 2016, 2024

- Asian Games

Runners-up: 2006
Third place: 2014

=== Regional ===
- WAFF U-23 Championship

Winners: 2023

- AGCFF U-23 Gulf Cup

Runners-up: 2025

=== Exhibition Tournaments ===
- Stafford Challenge Cup

Winners: 1990

- International Friendship Tournament (Abha)

Winners: 2003

== Head-to-head record ==
As of 16 April 2026 after match against Australia.

The following table shows Iraq under-23 team's all-time international record.

Key

Positive balance (more wins than losses)
Neutral balance (as many wins as losses)
Negative balance (more losses than wins)

Iraq under-23 team head-to-head records
Against	First	Last	GP	W	D	L	GF	GA	GD	% Win	Confederation
Afghanistan	2017	2017	1	1	0	0	8	0	+8	100%	AFC
Algeria	2016	2016	2	1	0	1	3	4	−1	50%	CAF
Argentina	2024	2024	1	0	0	1	1	3	−2	0%	CONMEBOL
Australia	2004	2026	8	1	5	2	4	6	−2	43.75%	AFC
Bahrain	2002	2021	7	4	2	1	13	6	+7	71.43%	AFC
Brazil	2016	2016	1	0	1	0	0	0	0	50%	CONMEBOL
China	1996	2026	6	3	1	2	4	7	−3	58.33%	AFC
Costa Rica	2004	2004	1	1	0	0	2	0	+2	100%	CONCACAF
Denmark	2016	2016	1	0	1	0	0	0	0	50%	UEFA
Dominican Republic	2023	2023	1	1	0	0	3	1	+2	100%	CONCACAF
Indonesia	2006	2024	2	2	0	0	8	1	+7	100%	AFC
Iran	2011	2023	8	4	2	2	11	5	+6	56.25%	AFC
Jordan	1995	2024	12	7	3	2	20	14	+6	77.27%	AFC
Morocco	2003	2024	4	2	0	2	3	5	−2	50%	CAF
Pakistan	2025	2025	1	1	0	0	8	1	+7	100%	AFC
Saudi Arabia	1996	2024	17	9	4	4	26	14	+12	64.71%	AFC
Thailand	2007	2026	8	3	4	1	8	7	+1	62.5%	AFC
Ukraine	2024	2024	1	1	0	0	2	1	+1	100%	UEFA
Vietnam	1999	2024	8	4	4	0	14	5	+9	75%	AFC
53 Countries	1995	2026	193	103	51	39	343	180	+162	53.65%	FIFA
Last match updated was against Australia on 14 January 2026.

== See also ==
- Iraq national football team
- Iraq national under-20 football team
- Iraq national under-17 football team
