= 2013 AFC U-22 Championship final =

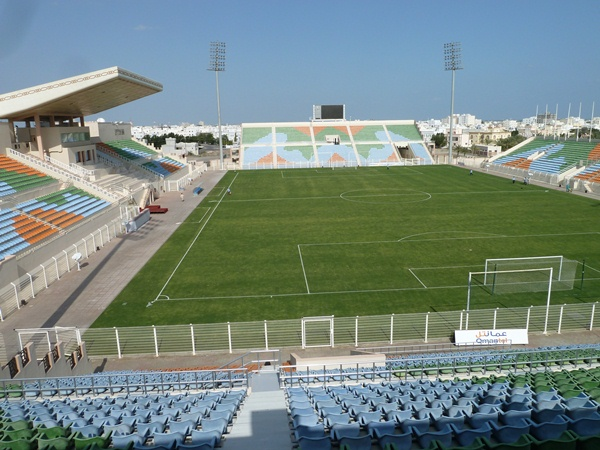
- Seeb Stadium in Seeb hosted the final.
- Event: 2013 AFC U-22 Championship
Iraq	Saudi Arabia
(Iraq)	(Saudi Arabia)
1	0
- Date: 26 January 2014
- Venue: Seeb Stadium, Seeb
- Man of the Match: Jalal Hassan
- Referee: Mohammed Abdulla Hassan Mohamed (UAE)

The 2013 AFC U-22 Championship final was a football match that took place on 26 January 2014 at the Seeb Stadium in Seeb of Oman, to determine the winners of the 2013 AFC U-22 Championship. The match was contested by Iraq and Saudi Arabia, the winners of the semi-finals.

Iraq defeated the Saudis thanks to a 33rd minute goal from Mohannad Abdul-Raheem and took their first Asian title at U-22 level.

== Route to the final ==
Iraq
Round
Saudi Arabia
Opponents
Result
Group stage
Opponents
Result
Saudi Arabia
3–1
Match 1
Iraq
1–3
Uzbekistan
2–1
Match 2
China
2–1
China
1–0
Match 3
Uzbekistan
1–0
Group D Winner

Pos	Team	Pld	Pts
1	Iraq	3	9
2	Saudi Arabia	3	6
3	Uzbekistan	3	3
4	China	3	0

Source: AFC
Final standings
Group B Winner

Pos	Team	Pld	Pts
1	Iraq	3	9
2	Saudi Arabia	3	6
3	Uzbekistan	3	3
4	China	3	0

Source: AFC
Opponents
Result
Knockout stage
Opponents
Result
Japan
1–0
Quarter-finals
Australia
2–1
South Korea
1–0
Semi-finals
Jordan
3–1

== Match ==
2013 AFC U-23 Championship
26 January 2014
19:30
Final

Iraq	1–0	Saudi Arabia
Abdul-Raheem 33'

Seeb Stadium, Seeb
Attendance: 4,700
Referee: Mohammed Abdulla Hassan Mohamed (United Arab Emirates)

Match rules:

- 90 minutes.
- 30 minutes of extra time if necessary.
- Penalty shoot-out if scores still level.
- Maximum of three substitutions, one substitution added if extra time.

== See also ==
- 2013 AFC U-22 Championship
