= Antoine Awad =

Jordanian-Canadian footballer (born 2002)

Tony Awad
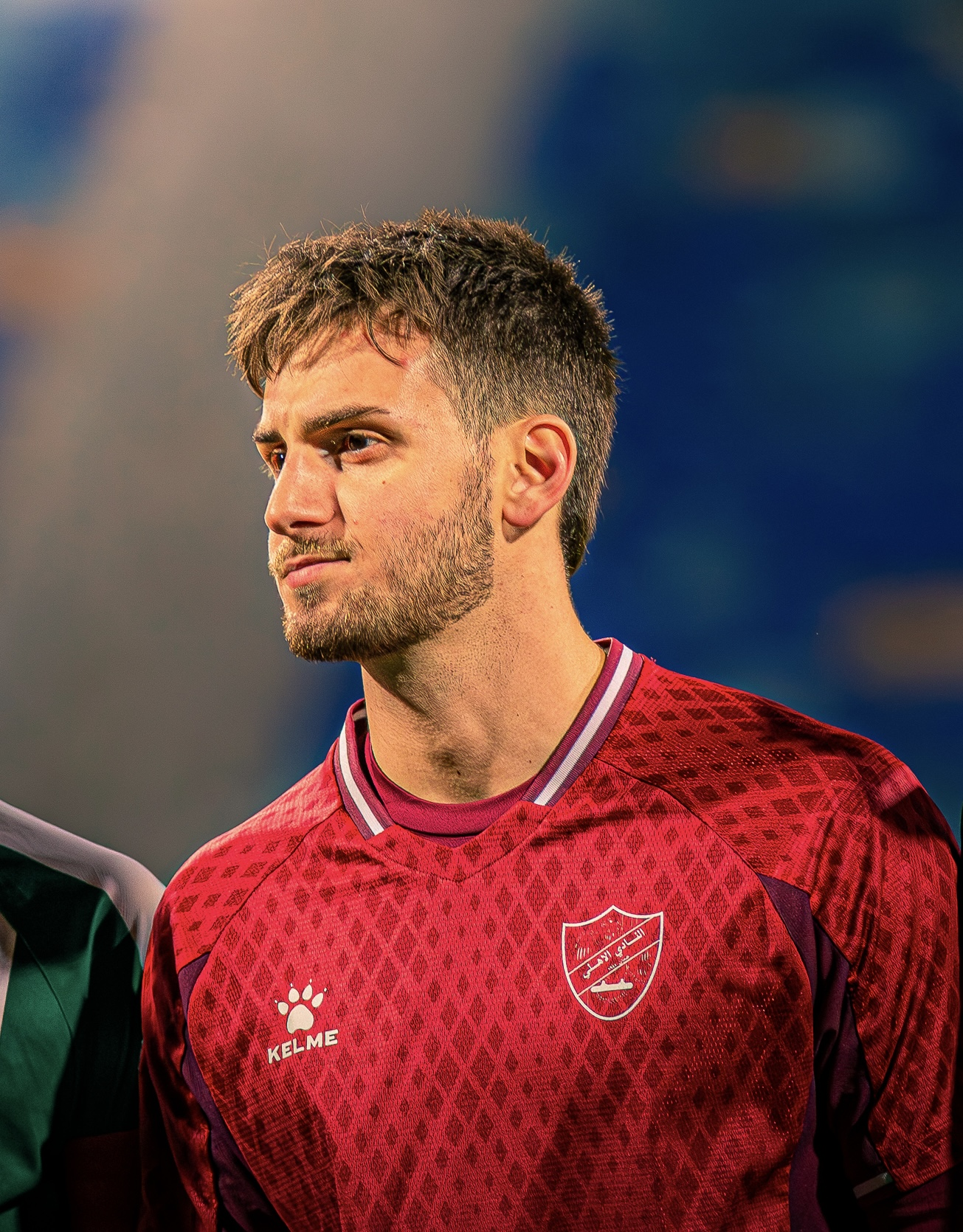
- Awad with Al-Ahli in 2026

Personal information
- Full name: Antoun Hani Awad
- Date of birth: 3 October 2002 (age 24)
- Place of birth: Athens, Greece
- Height: 1.81 m (5 ft 11 in)
- Position: Goalkeeper

Team information
- Current team: Al-Ramtha
- Number: 22

Youth career
- 2011-2014: Amman FC
- 2017–2020: Oakville SC
- 2022: Burlington SC U21

College career
Years	Team	Apps	(Gls)
2021–2022	Waterloo Warriors	4	(0)
2022–2025	Concordia Stingers	11	(0)

Senior career*
Years	Team	Apps	(Gls)
2025–2026	Al-Ahli	10	(0)
2026–	Al-Ramtha	0	(0)

International career
2023–2024	Jordan U23	3	(0)
- * Club domestic league appearances and goals as of 8 May 2026

Antoun Hani Awad (Arabic: أنطون هاني عوض; born 3 October 2002), also known as Anthony Awad or most commonly Tony Awad (Arabic: طوني عوض), is a Jordanian-Canadian professional footballer who plays as a goalkeeper for Jordanian Pro League club Al-Ramtha.

== Early life ==
Raised in Amman and Oakville, Awad went through the Amman FC youth academy in 2012.

He was also a part of Oakville SC's youth setup. He participated in the Canadian Premier League tryouts at Forge FC, where he progressed to the final stages.

== University career ==
=== Waterloo Warriors ===
On 17 December 2019, the Waterloo Warriors soccer program recruited Awad to their class of 2020. He would play 4 games during the Fall 2021 season.

=== Concordia Stingers ===
On 10 August 2022, Awad would transfer to the Concordia Stingers soccer program, where he would be eligible to compete in conference play in 2023 per U Sports transfer requirements.

He was noted for having a nine-save shutout for Concordia against the McGill Redbirds.

==== Trial at Derry City ====
Awad was a training goalkeeper at League of Ireland Premier Division with club Derry City from January until May of the 2025 season.

== Club career ==
=== Al-Ahli ===
On 8 June 2025, Awad joined Jordanian Pro League club Al-Ahli on a two-year contract.

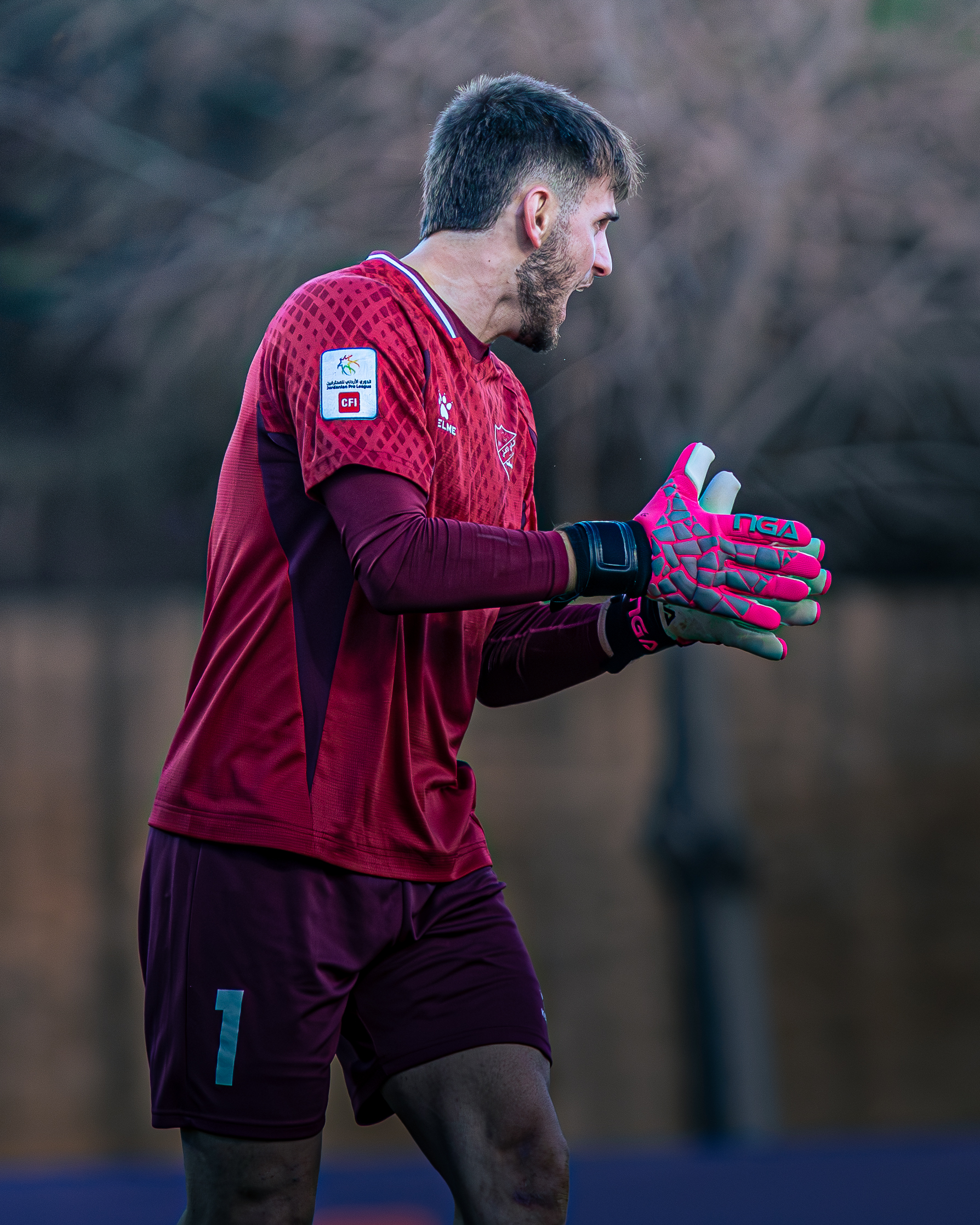
Awad pictured against Al-Baqaa in 2026

== International career ==
Awad received his first international call up on 26 August 2023 with the Jordan national under-23 football team under manager Abdullah Abu Zema. Awad would have a distinguished performance at the 2024 WAFF U-23 Championship against hosts Saudi Arabia, challenging Ahmad Al-Juaidi for a starting spot. Awad would subsequently get called up to the 2024 AFC U-23 Asian Cup squad.

On 3 January 2025, Awad received a call up to the Jordan national football team for a training camp held in Amman.
