= Aymen Luay =

Iraqi footballer (born 2005)

Personal information
- Full name: Aymen Luay Abdulhasan Akanees
- Date of birth: 23 May 2005 (age 21)
- Place of birth: Najaf, Iraq
- Height: 1.81 m (5 ft 11 in)
- Position: Forward

Team information
- Current team: Al-Minaa
- Number: 23

Youth career
- –2024: Al-Najaf

Senior career*
Years	Team	Apps	(Gls)
2024–2026	Al-Najaf	19	(3)
2025–2026	→ Al-Gharraf	14	(0)
2026–	Al-Minaa	0	(0)

International career^{‡}
2024–2025	Iraq U20	3	(4)
2025–	Iraq U23	4	(1)
- * Club domestic league appearances and goals as of 1 June 2026 ‡ National team caps and goals as of 14 January 2026

Aymen Luay Akanees (born 23 May 2005) is an Iraqi professional footballer who plays as a forward for Iraq Stars League side Al-Minaa.

== Club career ==
Aymen Luay began his football journey at the Al-Najaf Academy, where he developed through the club's youth system. In 2022, he represented Al-Najaf in the Iraqi U-16 League, showcasing his potential as one of the club's promising young talents. His breakthrough came in 2024, when he finished as the top scorer of the Iraqi U-19 League, scoring 20 goals and establishing himself as one of the country's most exciting young forwards.

Following his impressive performances at youth level, he was promoted to Al-Najaf's first team to compete in the Iraq Stars League. On 11 August 2025, he joined Al-Gharraf on a one-season loan before returning to Al-Najaf for the 2025–26 campaign. During the 2025–26 season, he scored his first goal in the Iraq Stars League on 17 April 2026, finding the net in stoppage time against Newroz to secure a dramatic 2–1 victory for Al-Najaf. He added another goal on 27 April 2026 against Duhok, despite his team suffering a 2–1 defeat. On 20 May 2026, he scored again against Al-Karkh in a 5–2 loss. At the end of the season, Al-Najaf was relegated from the Iraq Stars League. On 1 July 2026, he completed a permanent move to Al-Minaa, beginning a new chapter in his professional career.

== International career ==
Aymen Luay received his first call-up to the Iraq national team setup in 2024, when Iraq-20 head coach Emad Mohammed named him in the 23-man squad for the 2025 AFC U-20 Asian Cup qualification in Thailand. He made his debut against Brunei, scoring a hat-trick in his first appearance. Following his impressive performances in the qualifiers, Luay was included in Iraq's 26-man squad for the 2025 AFC U-20 Asian Cup in China. He scored in Iraq's opening match of the tournament against North Korea.

Luay was also selected for the Iraq-23 squad that competed in the 2025 AGCFF U-23 Gulf Cup in Qatar, During the tournament, he scored a goal against Oman. Following that, he was included in Iraq's squad to participate in the 2026 AFC U-23 Asian Cup in Saudi Arabia. Although Iraq did not qualify for the final tournament, Luay was one of the team's standout performers during the qualification campaign, producing impressive displays throughout the competition.
