= Ahmed Reyed =

Sudanese footballer (born 2003)

Ahmed Reyed أحمد رياض
Personal information
- Full name: Ahmed Reyed Mawla
- Date of birth: 1 February 2003 (age 23)
- Place of birth: Sudan
- Positions: Midfielder; right back

Team information
- Current team: Al Ahli
- Number: 41

Youth career
- Al-Khor

Senior career*
Years	Team	Apps	(Gls)
2020–2021	Al-Khor	4	(0)
2021–2025	Al-Duhail	2	(0)
2023–2025	→ Al-Khor (loan)	31	(0)
2025–	Al Ahli	8	(0)

International career
2025	Qatar U23	3	(0)
- * Club domestic league appearances and goals as of 17 January 2026

Ahmed Reyed Mawla (Arabic: أحمد رياض المولى; born 1 February 2003) is a professional footballer who plays as a right back for Al Ahli. Born in Sudan, he represents Qatar at youth level.

== Career ==
Ahmed started his career at the youth team of Al-Khor and represented the club at every level.

== Career statistics ==
=== Club ===
As of 24 December 2020.

Club	Season	League			Cup		Continental		Other		Total	
Club	Season	Division	Apps	Goals	Apps	Goals	Apps	Goals	Apps	Goals	Apps	Goals
Al-Khor	2020–21	Pro League	4	0	3	0	0	0	—		7	0
Career totals			4	0	3	0	0	0	0	0	7	0
