= Amoori Faisal =

Iraqi footballer (born 2005)

Personal information
- Full name: Amir Faisal Mutashar Al-Lami
- Date of birth: 1 May 2005 (age 21)
- Place of birth: Baghdad, Iraq
- Height: 1.76 m (5 ft 9 in)
- Position: Midfielder

Team information
- Current team: Al-Karma
- Number: 8

Youth career
- –2019: Al-Shorta

Senior career*
Years	Team	Apps	(Gls)
2019–2020	Al-Shorta	0	(0)
2019–2020	→ Al-Karkh (loan)		
2020–2022	Al-Karkh		
2022–2025	Al-Kahrabaa		
2025–	Al-Karma	20	(0)

International career^{‡}
2021–2022	Iraq U17		
2023–2025	Iraq U20	8	(5)
2023–	Iraq U23	11	(3)
- * Club domestic league appearances and goals as of 5 April 2026 ‡ National team caps and goals as of 5 April 2026

Amir Faisal Mutashar Al-Lami (Arabic: أمير فيصل مطشر اللامي; born 1 May 2005), known as Amoori Faisal, is an Iraqi professional footballer who plays as a midfielder for Iraq Stars League club Al-Karma and the Iraq U-23 national team.

== Club career ==
=== Al-Kahrabaa ===
Amoori signed for Al-Kahrabaa in 2022, with his first season going on to become the most successful season in the club's history, ending the season in fifth place and securing qualification for the 2023–24 AFC Cup. That team also included future national team stars Ali Jasim and Mustafa Saadoon, who were both signed by Iraqi giants Al-Quwa Al-Jawiya in the summer.

Amoori made his continental debut in September 2023 in Al-Kahrabaa's opening group game of the AFC Cup against Kuwait SC. He would go on to play every single match of the campaign as his side were eliminated in the zonal semi-finals to Lebanese club Al-Ahed. In the summer of 2024, Al-Kahrabaa renewed his contract for a third season, holding onto the player despite interest from Iraq's biggest clubs.

In the 2024–25 Iraq Stars League, Faisal was a key player for Al-Kahrabaa, playing all across the midfield, defensive to attacking, and on both wings throughout the season, scoring 4 goals. His standout performances earned him praise throughout the country, with Duhok manager Mesut Meral publicly stating his admiration for the young midfielder, who he predicted would be a star in the future and Al-Quwa Al-Jawiya having a $200,000 offer for him rejected, with the club president stating he wouldn't even sell to Borussia Dortmund in the winter transfer window after the club received several offers from Iraq and abroad for the youth international.

=== Al-Karma ===
In 2025 Faisal moved to Al-Karma.

== International career ==
=== Iraq U-20 ===
Amoori was called up to the Iraq U-20 national team in September 2024 for the 2025 U-20 Asian Cup qualifiers, captaining his country to three wins out of three, scoring three goals and registering two assists in the process, and securing qualification to the 2025 AFC U-20 Asian Cup, where he would lead Iraq, scoring two goals, to the quarter-finals before being knocked out by Australia.

=== Iraq U-23 ===
Faisal was called up to the Iraq U-23 national team for the U-23 Asian Cup qualifiers, playing in friendlies against Yemen and Oman and a 13–0 victory over Macau in the qualifiers.

Amoori was called up to the U-23s again in 2024 ahead of the U-23 West Asian Championship, starting three matches against Australia, UAE and Jordan.

In 2025, he was called up again for the U-23 Asian Cup qualifiers in Cambodia, where he started every single match, scoring in an 8–1 win over Pakistan. He was then included in Iraq's squad for the 2026 AFC U-23 Asian Cup, scoring in both games he appeared in against Thailand and Australia as Iraq went out in the group stage.

== Style of play ==
Amoori excels at playing in between the lines and changing the tempo of the game, finding solutions on the pitch.

== Career statistics ==
=== Club ===
As of match played 5 April 2026

Appearances and goals by club, season and competition
Club	Season	League			National cup (Note: Includes Iraq FA Cup)		Continental		Total	
Club	Season	Division	Apps	Goals	Apps	Goals	Apps	Goals	Apps	Goals
Al-Kahrabaa	2023–24	Iraq Stars League					8	1	8	1
Al-Kahrabaa	2024–25	Iraq Stars League	23	4	0	0	-	-	28	6
Al-Karma	2025–26	Iraq Stars League	20	0	1	0	-	-	20	0
Career total			43	4	1	0	8	1	52	5
