= Faris Khalil =

Emirati association football player (born 2000)

Faris Khalil فَارِس خَلِيل
Personal information
- Full name: Faris Khalil
- Date of birth: 8 October 2000 (age 26)
- Place of birth: Dubai, United Arab Emirates
- Height: 1.77 m (5 ft 10 in)
- Position: Left-back

Youth career
- –2018: Al-Wasl

Senior career*
Years	Team	Apps	(Gls)
2018–2026	Al-Wasl	41	(0)
2022	→ Emirates (loan)	7	(0)

International career
2019–2022	United Arab Emirates U23	5	(0)
- * Club domestic league appearances and goals

Faris Khalil (Arabic:فَارِس خَلِيل) (born 8 October 2000) is an Emirati footballer. He currently plays as a left back.

== Career ==
Faris Khalil started his career at Al-Wasl and is a product of the Al-Wasl's youth system. On 17 March 2018, Faris Khalil made his professional debut for Al-Wasl against Al Dhafra in the Pro League, replacing Hazza Salem.
