= Muslim Mousa =

Iraqi footballer (born 2005)

Personal information
- Full name: Muslim Mousa Fayyadh Al-Hamadani
- Date of birth: 11 March 2005 (age 21)
- Place of birth: Basra, Iraq
- Height: 1.74 m (5 ft 9 in)
- Position: Left back

Team information
- Current team: Al-Quwa Al-Jawiya
- Number: 3

Youth career
- –2022: Al-Minaa

Senior career*
Years	Team	Apps	(Gls)
2022–2026	Al-Minaa	61	(5)
2026–	Al-Quwa Al-Jawiya	7	(0)

International career^{‡}
2022–2025	Iraq U20	17	(1)
2025–	Iraq U23	6	(1)
- * Club domestic league appearances and goals as of 14 September 2025 ‡ National team caps and goals as of 16 December 2025

Muslim Mousa Fayyadh (Arabic: مسلم موسى فياض; born 11 March 2005) is an Iraqi professional footballer who plays as a left back for Iraq Stars League side Al-Quwa Al-Jawiya.

His father, Mousa Fayyadh, was a former player for Al-Minaa and the team captain.

== Club career ==
Mousa started playing football at the Al-Minaa Academy, and won with Al-Minaa U19 team, the Iraqi Youth Premier League in 2022.

In September 2022, he was promoted to play with the club's first team, and they won the Iraqi Premier Division League and gained promotion to the Iraq Stars League.

In September 2023, his contract with Al-Minaa was renewed and he played in the starting lineup regularly in the league, On December 29, 2023, he scored his first goal in the Iraq Stars League, which was the winning goal against Karbalaa in a match that ended with a score of 2–1 for Al-Minaa.

In August 2024, his contract with Al-Minaa was renewed for an additional season. He did not play much in the 2024–25 season, as the club allowed him to participate in the AFC U-20 Asian Cup in China after initially refusing to allow him. However, on December 5, 2024, he scored two goals against Erbil in a match that ended 3–0, and on January 2, 2025, he scored the winning goal against Naft Maysan in a match that ended 1–0. On 5 October 2025, he opened the scoring in the sixth minute against Al-Najaf, in a match that ended with a 4–2 victory for Al-Minaa.

In June 2026, Mousa moved to Al-Quwa Al-Jawiya during the summer transfer window.

== International career ==
Mousa was first picked to represent Iraq in 2022, when the under-20 coach Emad Mohammed selected him to be a part of his 26-man squad to play in 2022 Arab Cup U-20. He was also part of the squad for the 2023 AFC U-20 Asian Cup qualification, scoring the winning goal against Kuwait as Iraq qualified for the 2023 AFC U-20 Asian Cup despite losing to Australia. He was also part of the 21-man squad for the Iraq at the 2023 FIFA U-20 World Cup in Argentina. He was also part of 23-man squad for the 2023 AFC U-20 Asian Cup in Uzbekistan, where the team finished runners-up after losing to the host country in the final. He was also part of the 26-man squad for the under-20 team at the 2024 WAFF U-23 Championship in Saudi Arabia, and was also part of the 23-man squad for the 2025 AFC U-20 Asian Cup in China.

He was also part of under-23 squad for the 2026 AFC U-23 Asian Cup qualification in Cambodia, He was also named to the Olympic team for the AGCFF U-23 Gulf Cup in Qatar and scored a goal in his first match of the tournament against Yemen. The Olympic team finished in a runner-up after losing in the final against Saudi Arabia.

== Honours ==
Al-Minaa

- Iraqi Premier Division League: 2022–23

Iraq U-20

- AFC U-20 Asian Cup runner-up: 2023

Iraq U-23

- AGCFF U-23 Gulf Cup runner-up: 2025
