= Danial Afaneh =

Jordanian footballer

Personal information
- Full name: Danial Ahmed Mustafa Afaneh
- Date of birth: 24 March 2001 (age 25)
- Place of birth: Amman, Jordan
- Height: 1.84 m (6 ft 0 in)
- Position: Centre-back

Team information
- Current team: Al-Wehdat
- Number: 4

Youth career
- –2019: Al-Wehdat

Senior career*
| Years | Team | Apps | (Gls) |
| 2019– | Al-Wehdat | | |

International career^{‡}
| | Jordan U18 | 4 | (1) |
| | Jordan U20 | 3 | (1) |
| 2020–2024 | Jordan U23 | 19 | (0) |
- * Club domestic league appearances and goals ‡ National team caps and goals as of 21 April 2024

Danial Ahmed Mustafa Afaneh (Arabic: دانيال أحمد مصطفى عفانة; born 24 March 2001) is a Jordanian football player who plays as a centre-back for Jordanian Pro League club Al-Wehdat.

== Club career ==
=== Al-Wehdat ===
Born in Amman, Afaneh began his career at Al-Wehdat. On 4 August 2019, he signed a 5-year extension with the club.

On 19 May 2023, Afaneh scored the fastest goal in Jordan FA Shield history against Al-Hussein, with a goal registered in the first 43 seconds of the game.

== International career ==
Afaneh was with the Jordan national under-18 football team during the 2019 WAFF U-18 Championship.
