= Ahmad Al-Juaidi =

Jordanian footballer (born 2001)

Personal information
- Full name: Ahmad Mohannad Talab Al-Juaidi
- Date of birth: 9 April 2001 (age 25)
- Place of birth: Amman, Jordan
- Height: 1.77 m (5 ft 10 in)
- Position: Goalkeeper

Team information
- Current team: Al-Salt

Youth career
- –2020: Shabab Al-Ordon

Senior career*
Years	Team	Apps	(Gls)
2020–2024	Shabab Al-Ordon	41	(0)
2024–2025	Al-Wehdat	14	(0)
2025–2026	Shabab Al-Ordon	27	(0)
2026–	Al-Salt	0	(0)

International career^{‡}
2019–2020	Jordan U19		
2020–2024	Jordan U23	13	(0)
Medal record
Representing Jordan
Men's football
AFC Asian Cup
Runner-up	2023 Qatar	Team
- * Club domestic league appearances and goals as of 8 May 2026 ‡ National team caps and goals as of 21 April 2024

Ahmad Mohannad Talab Al-Juaidi (Arabic: أحمد مهند الجعيدي; born 9 April 2001) is a Jordanian professional footballer who plays as a goalkeeper for Jordanian Pro League side Al-Salt.

== Club career ==
Al-Juaidi is a youth product of Shabab Al-Ordon. In 2020, he was promoted to the first team of Shabab Al-Ordon and quickly gained the starter spot.

In February 2024, Al-Juaidi signed a season and a half contract for Al-Wehdat.

== International career ==
Al-Juaidi was part of the Jordan U23 team that won the 2021 WAFF U-23 Championship as the starter goalkeeper.

In January 2024, Al-Juaidi was named in the Jordan national team's 26-men squad for the 2023 AFC Asian Cup.

On 17 May 2026, Al-Juaidi was named in the Jordan national team's 30-men preliminary squad for the 2026 FIFA World Cup.

== Honours ==
Jordan U23

- WAFF U-23 Championship: 2021

Jordan

- AFC Asian Cup runner-up: 2023
