= 2023 WAFF U-23 Championship squads =

WAFF Championship tournament

The 2023 WAFF U-23 Championship was an international football tournament held in Iraq from 12 to 20 June 2023. It was the fourth edition of the U-23 age group competition organised by the West Asian Football Federation.

The nine national teams involved in the tournament are required to register a squad of at most 25 players, including three goalkeepers. Only players in these squads are eligible to take part in the tournament. Players born on or after 1 January 2000 were eligible to compete in the tournament.

The full squad listings are below. The age listed for each player is on 12 June 2023, the first day of the tournament. The nationality for each club reflects the national association (not the league) to which the club is affiliated. A flag is included for coaches who are of a different nationality than their own national team. Players in boldface were capped at full international level prior to being called up.

== Group A ==
=== Iraq ===
Coach: Radhi Shenaishil

On 15 May 2023, Iraq announced a 50-man preliminary squad. The final 25-man squad was announced on 5 June 2023.

No.	Pos.	Player	Date of birth (age)	Club
1	GK	Kumel Al Rekabe	19 August 2004 (aged 18)	(Swiss Football Association) Red Star
2	DF	Mustafa Saleh	27 April 2004 (aged 19)	(Italian Football Federation) Atalanta U-21
3	DF	Ahmed Maknzi	24 September 2001 (aged 21)	(Iraq Football Association) Erbil
4	DF	**Zaid Tahseen**	29 January 2001 (aged 22)	(Iraq Football Association) Al-Talaba
5	DF	Hussein Amer		(Iraq Football Association) Al-Sinaat Al-Kahrabaiya
6	DF	Josef Al-Imam	27 July 2004 (aged 18)	(Swedish Football Association) Olympic
7	FW	Dhulfiqar Younis	27 May 2001 (aged 22)	(Iraq Football Association) Al-Shorta
8	FW	Hussein Abdullah		(Iraq Football Association) Al-Talaba
9	FW	Blnd Hassan	12 August 2003 (aged 19)	(Royal Dutch Football Association) De Graafschap
10	FW	Nihad Mohammed	1 January 2001 (aged 22)	(Iraq Football Association) Al-Karkh
11	MF	**Muntadher Mohammed**	5 June 2001 (aged 22)	(Iraq Football Association) Al-Naft
12	GK	Ridha Abdulaziz		(Iraq Football Association) Al-Diwaniya
13	GK	Hassan Abbas	1 January 2001 (aged 22)	(Iraq Football Association) Al-Qasim
14	MF	Karrar Mohammed	28 May 2002 (aged 21)	(Iraq Football Association) Al-Naft
15	DF	Halo Fayaq	23 May 2001 (aged 22)	(Iraq Football Association) Erbil
16	FW	Montader Abdel Amir	6 October 2001 (aged 21)	(Iraq Football Association) Al-Quwa Al-Jawiya
17	DF	Mustafa Saadoon	4 September 1999 (aged 23)	(Iraq Football Association) Al-Kahrabaa
18	FW	Ali Almosawe	28 January 2002 (aged 21)	(Danish Football Association) B.93
19	MF	Zaid Ismail		(Iraq Football Association) Newroz
20	FW	Ali Mohammed Hatem	8 November 2002 (aged 20)	(Royal Spanish Football Federation) Las Rozas
21	FW	Zidane Abduljabbar	3 June 2000 (aged 23)	(Iraq Football Association) Karbala
22	GK	Mohammed Hasan	30 July 2002 (aged 20)	(Iraq Football Association) Al-Talaba
23	DF	Karrar Saad	7 March 2001 (aged 22)	(Iraq Football Association) Al-Karkh
24	FW	Salem Ahmad	28 December 2000 (aged 22)	(Iraq Football Association) Al-Minaa
25	MF	Amir Ahmed		(Iraq Football Association) Al-Hudood

=== UAE ===
Coach: Dennis Silva

=== Jordan ===
Coach: Abdullah Abu Zema

The final Jordan squad was announced on 3 June 2023.

No.	Pos.	Player	Date of birth (age)	Club
1	GK	Ahmad Al-Juaidi	9 April 2001 (age 25)	(Jordan Football Association) Shabab Al-Ordon
12	GK	Qais Abassi	24 May 2001 (age 25)	(Jordan Football Association) Al-Jazeera
22	GK	Murad Al-Faluji	27 December 2003 (age 22)	(Jordan Football Association) Al-Wehdat
2	DF	Laith Abu Rahal	8 September 2001 (age 25)	(Jordan Football Association) Al-Ahli
3	DF	Mo Abualnadi	8 February 2001 (age 25)	(United States Soccer Federation) Sporting Kansas City II
4	DF	Danial Afaneh (captain)	24 March 2001 (age 25)	(Jordan Football Association) Al-Wehdat
5	DF	Arafat Al-Haj	17 April 2003 (age 23)	(Jordan Football Association) Al-Wehdat
19	DF	Ammar Al-Husari	28 February 2002 (age 24)	(Jordan Football Association) Al-Jalil
21	DF	Baha Shamalty	15 April 2001 (age 25)	(Jordan Football Association) Al-Ahli
23	DF	Faisal Abu Shanab	9 August 2001 (age 25)	(Jordan Football Association) Shabab Al-Ordon
6	MF	Mohanad Al-Aramsheh	23 October 2001 (age 25)	(Jordan Football Association) Al-Hussein
9	MF	Amer Jamous	3 July 2002 (age 24)	(Jordan Football Association) Al-Wehdat
10	MF	Waseem Al-Riyalat	25 June 2001 (age 25)	(Jordan Football Association) Shabab Al-Ordon
11	MF	Bashar Al-Diabat	23 July 2001 (age 25)	(Jordan Football Association) Al-Ramtha
14	MF	Seif Darwish	5 May 2003 (age 23)	(Jordan Football Association) Al-Hussein
16	MF	Mohammad Abu Hazeem	2 April 2003 (age 23)	(Jordan Football Association) Al-Wehdat
18	MF	Mousa Al-Omari	9 December 2001 (age 24)	(Jordan Football Association) Al-Salt
7	FW	Saif Al-Bashabsheh	23 June 2001 (age 25)	(Jordan Football Association) Al-Faisaly
8	FW	Mohannad Abu Taha	2 February 2003 (age 23)	(Jordan Football Association) Al-Wehdat
13	FW	Aref Al-Haj	28 May 2001 (age 25)	(Palestinian Football Association) Jabal Al-Mukaber
15	FW	Ali Al-Azaizeh	13 April 2004 (age 22)	(Jordan Football Association) Al-Ramtha
17	FW	Amin Al-Shanaineh	7 April 2003 (age 23)	(Jordan Football Association) Al-Faisaly
20	FW	Reziq Bani Hani	28 January 2002 (age 24)	(Jordan Football Association) Al-Faisaly

== Group B ==
=== Palestine ===
Coach: Ihab Abu Jazar

Palestine announced their final squad on 11 June 2023.

No.	Pos.	Player	Date of birth (age)	Club
1	GK	Anwar Al-Aqraa	30 June 2002 (aged 20)	(Palestinian Football Association) Islami Qalqilya
2	DF	Josef El-Subaihi	15 June 2003 (aged 19)	Free agent
3	MF	Ahmad Kallab	8 November 2001 (aged 21)	(Palestinian Football Association) Ittihad Khanyounis
4	DF	Ali Rabei	9 October 2001 (aged 21)	(Palestinian Football Association) Ahli Al-Khaleel
5	DF	Ibrahim Abu Umair	18 October 2002 (aged 20)	(Palestinian Football Association) Markaz Balata
6	MF	Qais Taha	23 July 2003 (aged 19)	(Palestinian Football Association) Thaqafi Tulkarem
7	FW	Khaled Al-Nabris	27 March 2003 (aged 20)	(Palestinian Football Association) Ittihad Khanyounis
8	MF	Muhannad Hassanein	14 May 2003 (aged 20)	(Palestinian Football Association) Khadamat Rafah
9	MF	Zaid Qanbar	4 September 2002 (aged 20)	(Palestinian Football Association) Jabal Al-Mukaber
10	MF	Anas Bani Odeh	7 September 2001 (aged 21)	(Palestinian Football Association) Shabab Al-Dhahiriya
11	FW	Samer Zubaida	26 April 2001 (aged 22)	(Palestinian Football Association) Hilal Al-Quds
12	DF	Omar Kayed	18 July 2001 (aged 21)	(Lebanese Football Association) AC Tripoli
13	MF	Sadeq Obaid	26 April 2002 (aged 21)	(Palestinian Football Association) Hilal Al-Quds
14	MF	Jehad Abou El Aynain	10 August 2003 (aged 19)	(Lebanese Football Association) Al-Ahed
15	DF	Wajdi Nabhan	27 July 2001 (aged 21)	(Palestinian Football Association) Shabab Al-Bireh Institute
16	GK	Mahdi Assi	24 December 2004 (aged 18)	(Palestinian Football Association) Shabab Al-Bireh Institute
17	MF	Yahya Abu Farah	1 April 2002 (aged 21)	(Palestinian Football Association) Shabab Beit Fajjar
18	MF	Khaled Al Ghoul	8 September 2002 (aged 20)	(Croatian Football Federation) NK Jarun
19	MF	Hamza Hussein	2 May 2002 (aged 21)	(Lebanese Football Association) Al Ansar
20	FW	Gibrán Haj Yousef	27 January 2001 (aged 22)	(Venezuelan Football Federation) Mineros de Guayana
21	DF	Muhammad Abu Awwad	24 March 2001 (aged 22)	(Palestinian Football Association) Shabab Al-Samu
22	GK	Abdul Hadi Yassin	11 May 2004 (aged 19)	(Israel Football Association) Bnei Sakhnin
23	DF	Amr Rizk	23 April 2003 (aged 20)	(Palestinian Football Association) Gaza Sports Club

=== Iran ===
Coach: (Iran) Reza Enayati

No.	Pos.	Player	Date of birth (age)	Club
1	GK	Mohammadreza Khaled Abadi	30 April 2001 (aged 22)	(Football Federation Islamic Republic of Iran) Havadar
2	DF	Saman Touranian	12 December 2001 (aged 21)	(Football Federation Islamic Republic of Iran) Sanat Mes Kerman
3	DF	Hossein Goudarzi	4 May 2001 (aged 22)	(Football Federation Islamic Republic of Iran) Naft Masjed Soleyman
4	DF	Saman Fallah	12 May 2001 (aged 22)	(Football Federation Islamic Republic of Iran) Paykan
5	DF	Amin Hazbavi	6 May 2003 (aged 20)	(Qatar Football Association) Al Sadd
6	MF	Alireza Bavieh	21 August 2002 (aged 20)	(Football Federation Islamic Republic of Iran) Foolad
7	FW	Amirali Sadeghi	9 February 2001 (aged 22)	(Football Federation Islamic Republic of Iran) Esteghlal
8	MF	Mohammad Hossein Zavari	11 January 2001 (aged 22)	(Football Federation Islamic Republic of Iran) Esteghlal
9	FW	Ahmad Shariatzadeh	1 July 2001 (aged 21)	(Football Federation Islamic Republic of Iran) Naft Abadan
10	MF	Yasin Salmani (captain)	20 December 2001 (aged 21)	(Football Federation Islamic Republic of Iran) Sepahan
11	MF	Aria Barzegar	10 November 2002 (aged 20)	(Football Federation Islamic Republic of Iran) Naft Masjed Soleyman
12	GK	Mohammad Javad Kia	29 August 2001 (aged 21)	(Football Federation Islamic Republic of Iran) Aluminium Arak
13	DF	Arya Yousefi	22 April 2002 (aged 21)	(Football Federation Islamic Republic of Iran) Sepahan
14	MF	Amir Hassan Jafari	20 August 1999 (aged 23)	(Football Federation Islamic Republic of Iran) Gol Gohar Sirjan
15	DF	Saeed Irankhah	12 February 2001 (aged 22)	(Football Federation Islamic Republic of Iran) Fajr Sepasi
16	MF	Mohammad Ghorbani	21 May 2001 (aged 22)	(Football Federation Islamic Republic of Iran) Sepahan
17	DF	Mohammad Mehdi Ahmadi	10 January 2001 (aged 22)	(Football Federation Islamic Republic of Iran) Persepolis
18	FW	Mohammadhossein Eslami	13 April 2001 (aged 22)	(Football Federation Islamic Republic of Iran) Zob Ahan
19	MF	mojtaba Fakhriam		(Football Federation Islamic Republic of Iran) Aluminium Arak
20	FW	Mehdi Hashemnejad	27 October 2001 (aged 21)	(Football Federation Islamic Republic of Iran) Tractor
21	FW	Mohammadreza Bordbar		(Football Federation Islamic Republic of Iran) Malavan
22	GK	Sina Bakhtiari		(Football Federation Islamic Republic of Iran) Naft Masjed Soleyman
23	FW	Behzad Salami	23 March 2002 (aged 21)	(Football Federation Islamic Republic of Iran) Tractor

=== Syria ===
Coach: (Netherlands) Mark Wotte

== Group C ==
=== Lebanon ===
Coach: (Portugal) Miguel Moreira

Lebanon announced the final 25-man squad on 2 June 2023.

No.	Pos.	Player	Date of birth (age)	Club
	GK	Hadi Kanj	14 September 2001 (aged 21)	(Lebanese Football Association) Ansar
	GK	Rami Mjalli	15 October 2003 (aged 19)	(Swiss Football Association) Chênois
	GK	Anthony Alexander Maasri		Free agent
	DF	Mohamed Al-Mahdi Al-Moussawi	3 October 2003 (aged 19)	(Lebanese Football Association) Akhaa Ahli Aley
	DF	Alex El Rattel	17 May 2002 (aged 21)	(Lebanese Football Association) Ansar
	DF	Hussein Ezzeddine		(Lebanese Football Association) Racing Beirut
	DF	Ali Ismail	8 July 2003 (aged 19)	(Lebanese Football Association) Nejmeh
	DF	Ibrahim Chami	12 December 2003 (aged 19)	(Canadian Soccer Association) FC Laval
	DF	Ali Hakim		(Lebanese Football Association) Akhaa Ahli Aley
	MF	Samuel Harb	18 April 2002 (aged 21)	(Portuguese Football Federation) Alverca
	MF	Mohammed Haidar		(Lebanese Football Association) Shabab Sahel
	MF	Sajid Amhaz	13 June 2003 (aged 19)	(Lebanese Football Association) Safa
	MF	Hussein Saleh		(Lebanese Football Association) Racing Beirut
	MF	Mohamad Ghamlouch	19 May 2003 (aged 20)	(Lebanese Football Association) Nejmeh
	MF	Ahmed Zein El-Din		(Lebanese Football Association) Sagesse
	MF	Hassan Farhat		(Lebanese Football Association) Ahed
	MF	Mohamad Safwan	10 March 2003 (aged 20)	(Lebanese Football Association) Bourj
	FW	Ali Chaito	1 January 2002 (aged 21)	(Lebanese Football Association) Bourj
	FW	Mohammad Al-Massri	22 June 2001 (aged 21)	(Lebanese Football Association) Akhaa Ahli Aley
	FW	Mohamed Sabbah	20 May 2002 (aged 21)	Free agent
	FW	Mohamad Omar Sadek	25 October 2003 (aged 19)	(Lebanese Football Association) Bourj
	FW	Ali Kassas	25 May 2003 (aged 20)	(Lebanese Football Association) Nejmeh
	FW	Omar Bahlawan	20 December 2004 (aged 18)	(Lebanese Football Association) Ansar
	FW	Ali Haidar		Free agent
	FW	Jawad Koutharani	17 August 2002 (aged 20)	(Lebanese Football Association) Tadamon Sour

=== Yemen ===
Coach:

=== Oman ===
Coach: (Croatia) Dario Bašić

Oman announced their final squad on 10 June 2023.

No.	Pos.	Player	Date of birth (age)	Caps	Goals	Club
1	GK	Mutie Al-Saadi		0	0	(Oman Football Association) Al-Suwaiq
22	GK	Mazen Saleh	28 January 2003 (age 23)	0	0	(Oman Football Association) Muscat
2	DF	Ayman Al-Nabhani	27 July 2003 (age 23)	2	0	(Oman Football Association) Al-Hamra
3	DF	Mohammed Al-Hatmi	27 October 2001 (age 25)	0	0	(Oman Football Association) Al-Seeb
4	DF	Abdullah Al-Mukhaini		1	0	(Oman Football Association) Al-Orouba
13	DF	Abdullah Al-Fleti		2	0	(Oman Football Association) Al-Shabab
20	DF	Majeed Al-Balushi		0	0	(Oman Football Association) Oman
6	MF	Saeed Al-Salami		1	0	(Oman Football Association) Muscat
7	MF	Nasser Al-Rawahi	26 June 2001 (age 25)	2	0	(Oman Football Association) Al-Suwaiq
8	MF	Mohammed Beit Subei	9 November 2004 (age 21)	1	0	(Oman Football Association) Al-Nasr
18	MF	Mohammed Al-Hinai		1		(Oman Football Association) Al-Nahda
19	MF	Abdullah Al-Habsi	25 February 2001 (age 25)	0	0	(Oman Football Association) Al-Seeb
21	MF	Abdul Hafez Al-Mukhaini		2	0	(Oman Football Association) Al-Orouba
9	FW	Nibras Al-Maashari	1 May 2002 (age 24)	1	0	(Oman Football Association) Muscat
10	FW	Asad Al-Balushi		1	0	(Oman Football Association) Ahli Sidab
11	FW	Omar Al-Salti	17 February 2002 (age 24)	1	0	(Oman Football Association) Al-Orouba
14	FW	Salem Al-Abdulsalam		2	0	(Oman Football Association) Dhofar
17	FW	Yusuf Al-Ghaliani		2	0	(Oman Football Association) Al-Orouba
