= 2024 AFC U-23 Asian Cup squads =

Asian youth football tournament

The 2024 AFC U-23 Asian Cup is an under-23 international football tournament organised by the Asian Football Confederation, taking place in Qatar between 15 April and 3 May 2024. The sixteen national teams involved in the tournament were required to register a squad of a minimum of 18 and a maximum of 23 players, including at least three goalkeepers (Regulations Article 26.3). Only players in these squads were eligible to take part in the competition. The tournament exclusively requires players to be born on or after 1 January 2001 to be eligible (Regulations Article 22.1.3).

Each national team had to register a preliminary list of minimum of 18 and maximum of 50 players (including at least four goalkeepers) via the Asian Football Confederation Administration System (AFCAS) no later than 30 days before to its first match of the tournament. Teams were able to replace or add up to 5 players to their preliminary list no later than 7 days before to its first match of the tournament provided that the maximum number of registered players is not exceeded (Regulations Article 25). The final list of 18−23 players per national team had to be submitted to the AFC at least 10 days prior to its first match of the tournament. All players in the final selection must had been registered in the preliminary list (Regulations Article 26.3.1).

On 10 April 2024, the AFC published the final lists with squad numbers.

Once the final lists had been received by the AFC, teams may had replaced any player up to 6 hours prior to their first match of the tournament. Any replacement player should come from the preliminary list (Regulations Article 26.4).

The age listed for each player is as of 15 April 2024, the first day of the tournament. Players in bold have been capped at full international level.

== Group A ==
=== Australia ===
Australia announced their final squad on 4 April 2024. The following week Marco Tilio withdrew from the squad due to a quad injury and was replaced by Keegan Jelacic, while Louis D'Arrigo was withdrawn due to his club making him unavailable and was replaced by Lucas Mauragis.

Coach: Tony Vidmar

No.	Pos.	Player	Date of birth (age)	Caps	Goals	Club
1	GK	Cameron Cook	16 August 2001 (age 25)	3	0	(Football Australia) Perth Glory
2	DF	Callum Talbot	26 February 2001 (age 25)	6	0	(Football Australia) Melbourne City
3	DF	Alexandar Popovic	7 September 2002 (age 24)	1	0	(Korea Football Association) Gwangju FC
4	DF	Jordan Courtney-Perkins	6 November 2002 (age 23)	14	0	(Football Australia) Sydney FC
5	DF	Jacob Farrell	19 November 2002 (age 23)	6	0	(Football Australia) Central Coast Mariners
6	MF	Ryan Teague	24 January 2002 (age 24)	13	1	(Football Australia) Melbourne Victory
7	FW	Lachlan Brook	8 February 2001 (age 25)	16	2	(Football Australia) Western Sydney Wanderers
8	MF	Keegan Jelacic	31 July 2002 (age 24)	4	0	(Football Australia) Brisbane Roar
9	FW	Alou Kuol	5 July 2001 (age 25)	15	5	(Football Australia) Central Coast Mariners
10	MF	Jake Hollman	26 August 2001 (age 25)	8	1	(Football Australia) Macarthur FC
11	FW	**Nishan Velupillay**	7 May 2001 (age 25)	13	5	(Football Australia) Melbourne Victory
12	GK	Patrick Beach	6 August 2003 (age 23)	3	0	(Football Australia) Melbourne City
13	MF	Rhys Youlley	13 February 2005 (age 21)	2	0	(Royal Belgian Football Association) Westerlo
14	FW	Nicolas Milanovic	14 November 2001 (age 24)	2	0	(Football Australia) Western Sydney Wanderers
15	DF	Jake Girdwood-Reich	26 May 2004 (age 22)	2	0	(Football Australia) Sydney FC
16	MF	Jordi Valadon	4 March 2003 (age 23)	1	0	(Football Australia) Melbourne Victory
17	DF	Jacob Italiano	30 July 2001 (age 25)	15	2	(German Football Association) Borussia Mönchengladbach
18	GK	Steven Hall	16 January 2005 (age 21)	2	0	(The Football Association) Brighton & Hove Albion
19	FW	**Mohamed Toure**	26 March 2004 (age 22)	2	1	(French Football Federation) Paris FC
20	DF	Mark Natta	28 November 2002 (age 23)	4	0	(Football Australia) Newcastle Jets
21	MF	Adrian Segecic	1 June 2004 (age 22)	3	0	(Royal Dutch Football Association) Dordrecht
22	FW	**Garang Kuol**	15 September 2004 (age 22)	8	1	(Royal Dutch Football Association) Volendam
23	DF	Lucas Mauragis	4 September 2001 (age 25)	11	0	(Football Australia) Newcastle Jets

=== Indonesia ===
Indonesia announced a 28-men preliminary squad on 1 April 2024. The squad was reduced to 26 players on 5 April after Justin Hubner, Alfeandra Dewangga and Nathan Tjoe-A-On withdrew due to multiple reasons. Kakang Rudianto was called up as a replacement. On 10 April, Justin Hubner was re-added to the squad. On 15 April, Nathan Tjoe-A-On returned to the squad and replaced Dzaky Asraf. At the same day, Bagas Kaffa replaced Kakang Rudianto.

Coach: (South Korea) Shin Tae-yong

No.	Pos.	Player	Date of birth (age)	Caps	Goals	Club
1	GK	**Adi Satryo**	7 July 2001 (age 25)	7	0	(Football Association of Indonesia) PSIS Semarang
2	DF	Rio Fahmi	6 October 2001 (age 25)	16	1	(Football Association of Indonesia) Persija Jakarta
3	DF	**Muhammad Ferarri**	21 June 2003 (age 23)	13	2	(Football Association of Indonesia) Persija Jakarta
4	DF	Komang Teguh	28 April 2002 (age 24)	18	2	(Football Association of Indonesia) Borneo Samarinda
5	DF	**Rizky Ridho** (captain)	21 November 2001 (age 24)	28	1	(Football Association of Indonesia) Persija Jakarta
6	MF	**Ivar Jenner**	10 January 2004 (age 22)	5	1	(Royal Dutch Football Association) Utrecht
7	MF	**Marselino Ferdinan**	9 September 2004 (age 22)	21	6	(Royal Belgian Football Association) Deinze
8	MF	**Witan Sulaeman**	8 October 2001 (age 24)	35	9	(Football Association of Indonesia) Bhayangkara
9	FW	**Ramadhan Sananta**	27 November 2002 (age 23)	16	8	(Football Association of Indonesia) Persis Solo
10	DF	**Justin Hubner**	14 September 2003 (age 23)	2	0	(Japan Football Association) Cerezo Osaka
11	FW	**Rafael Struick**	27 March 2003 (age 23)	7	1	(Royal Dutch Football Association) ADO Den Haag
12	DF	**Pratama Arhan**	21 December 2001 (age 24)	14	2	(Korea Football Association) Suwon FC
13	DF	Bagas Kaffa	16 January 2002 (age 24)	11	0	(Football Association of Indonesia) Barito Putera
14	MF	Fajar Fathur Rahman	29 May 2002 (age 24)	9	5	(Football Association of Indonesia) Borneo Samarinda
15	MF	Ikhsan Zikrak	8 November 2002 (age 23)	1	0	(Football Association of Indonesia) Borneo Samarinda
16	MF	**Arkhan Fikri**	28 December 2004 (age 21)	8	0	(Football Association of Indonesia) Arema
17	DF	**Dony Tri Pamungkas**	11 January 2005 (age 21)	5	0	(Football Association of Indonesia) Persija Jakarta
18	MF	**Rayhan Hannan**	24 April 2004 (age 22)	2	0	(Football Association of Indonesia) Persija Jakarta
19	FW	Jeam Kelly Sroyer	11 December 2002 (age 23)	12	1	(Football Association of Indonesia) Persik Kediri
20	FW	**Hokky Caraka**	21 August 2004 (age 22)	3	1	(Football Association of Indonesia) PSS Sleman
21	GK	**Ernando Ari**	27 February 2002 (age 24)	25	0	(Football Association of Indonesia) Persebaya Surabaya
22	GK	**Daffa Fasya**	7 May 2004 (age 22)	0	0	(Football Association of Indonesia) Borneo Samarinda
23	DF	**Nathan Tjoe-A-On**	22 December 2001 (age 24)	3	0	(Royal Dutch Football Association) Heerenveen

=== Jordan ===
Jordan announced a 26-men preliminary squad on 6 April 2024. Omar Salah was withdrawn on 15 April due to his club making him unavailable and was replaced by Ibrahim Sabra. On the same day, Mohammad Abu Hazeem withdrew due to injury and was replaced by Mohammad Abu Taha.

Coach: Abdullah Abu Zema

No.	Pos.	Player	Date of birth (age)	Club
1	GK	Ahmad Al-Juaidi	9 April 2001 (aged 23)	(Jordan Football Association) Al-Wehdat
2	DF	Laith Abu Rahal	8 September 2001 (aged 22)	(Jordan Football Association) Al-Ahli
3	DF	**Mo Abualnadi**	8 February 2001 (aged 23)	(Jordan Football Association) Al-Hussein
4	DF	Danial Afaneh (captain)	24 March 2001 (aged 23)	(Jordan Football Association) Al-Wehdat
5	DF	Arafat Al-Haj	17 April 2003 (aged 20)	(Jordan Football Association) Al-Wehdat
6	FW	**Mohannad Abu Taha**	2 February 2003 (aged 21)	(Jordan Football Association) Al-Wehdat
7	FW	**Aref Al-Haj**	28 May 2001 (aged 22)	(Jordan Football Association) Al-Faisaly
8	MF	Mohammad Abu Taha	5 June 2001 (aged 22)	(Jordan Football Association) Shabab Al-Ordon
9	MF	Amer Jamous	3 July 2002 (aged 21)	(Jordan Football Association) Al-Wehdat
10	MF	Waseem Al-Riyalat	25 June 2001 (aged 22)	(Jordan Football Association) Al-Hussein
11	MF	Bashar Al-Diabat	23 July 2001 (aged 22)	(Jordan Football Association) Al-Ramtha
12	GK	Osama Al-Kawamleh	16 August 2002 (aged 21)	(Jordan Football Association) Al-Jalil
13	FW	**Ibrahim Sabra**	1 February 2006 (aged 18)	(Jordan Football Association) Al-Wehdat
14	FW	Seif Darwish	5 May 2003 (aged 20)	(Jordan Football Association) Al-Hussein
15	FW	Ali Azaizeh	13 April 2004 (aged 20)	(Jordan Football Association) Al-Ramtha
16	FW	Saif Al-Bashabsheh	23 June 2001 (aged 22)	(Jordan Football Association) Al-Salt
17	MF	Aon Al-Maharmeh	16 January 2001 (aged 23)	(Jordan Football Association) Ma'an
18	MF	Ahmed Al-Salman	2 July 2002 (aged 21)	(Jordan Football Association) Al-Ramtha
19	DF	Youssef Hassan	2 February 2003 (aged 21)	(Jordan Football Association) Al-Jalil
20	FW	**Reziq Bani Hani**	28 January 2002 (aged 22)	(Jordan Football Association) Al-Faisaly
21	FW	Baker Kalbouneh	14 August 2003 (aged 20)	(Jordan Football Association) Al-Faisaly
22	GK	Antoine Awad	3 October 2002 (aged 21)	(Canadian Soccer Association) Concordia Stingers
23	DF	Faisal Abu Shanab	9 August 2001 (aged 22)	(Jordan Football Association) Al-Faisaly

=== Qatar ===
Qatar announced a 24-men preliminary squad on 5 April 2024. On 12 April, Eissa Al-Najjar was replaced by Lotfi Madjer.

Coach: (Portugal) Ilídio Vale

No.	Pos.	Player	Date of birth (age)	Club
1	GK	Yousef Baliadeh	30 October 2002 (age 23)	(Qatar Football Association) Al-Sadd
2	DF	**Abdullah Yousif**	10 April 2002 (age 24)	(Qatar Football Association) Al-Gharafa
3	DF	Saifeldeen Fadlalla	31 March 2003 (age 23)	(Qatar Football Association) Al-Gharafa
4	DF	**Mohammed Aiash**	27 February 2001 (age 25)	(Qatar Football Association) Al-Ahli
5	DF	**Hashemi Al-Hussain**	15 August 2003 (age 23)	(Royal Spanish Football Federation) Calahorra
6	MF	**Mostafa Meshaal**	28 March 2001 (age 25)	(Qatar Football Association) Al Sadd
7	MF	Fares Said	7 January 2003 (age 23)	(Qatar Football Association) Al-Duhail
8	MF	**Naif Al-Hadhrami**	18 July 2001 (age 25)	(Qatar Football Association) Al-Rayyan
9	FW	**Tameem Al-Abdullah**	5 October 2002 (age 24)	(Qatar Football Association) Al-Rayyan
10	FW	**Khalid Ali Sabah**	5 October 2001 (age 25)	(Qatar Football Association) Al-Wakrah
11	DF	**Abdullah Al-Yazidi**	28 March 2002 (age 24)	(Qatar Football Association) Al-Sadd
12	FW	**Mubarak Shanan**	20 February 2004 (age 22)	(Royal Spanish Football Federation) Calahorra
13	DF	Abdullah Al-Ali	20 November 2001 (age 24)	(Qatar Football Association) Al-Rayyan
14	MF	**Mahdi Salem**	4 April 2004 (age 22)	(Qatar Football Association) Al-Shamal
15	MF	**Jassem Gaber**	20 February 2002 (age 24)	(Qatar Football Association) Al-Arabi
16	MF	Jassem Al-Sharshani	2 January 2003 (age 23)	(Qatar Football Association) Al Ahli
17	MF	Lotfi Madjer	22 March 2002 (age 24)	(Qatar Football Association) Al-Duhail
18	MF	**Nabil Irfan**	7 February 2004 (age 22)	(Qatar Football Association) Al-Wakrah
19	FW	**Ahmed Al-Rawi**	30 May 2004 (age 22)	(Qatar Football Association) Al-Rayyan
20	FW	**Mohamed Khaled Gouda**	26 January 2005 (age 21)	(Royal Spanish Football Federation) Calahorra
21	GK	**Ali Nader Mahmoud**	7 July 2002 (age 24)	(Qatar Football Association) Al-Khor
22	GK	Amir Hassan	22 April 2004 (age 22)	(Qatar Football Association) Al-Arabi
23	MF	Mohamed Al-Manai	25 October 2002 (age 23)	(Qatar Football Association) Al-Markhiya

== Group B ==
=== China ===
China announced their final squad on 5 April 2024. On 16 April 2024, Chen Yuhao was called up as a replacement to Mutellip Iminqari, who misses out due to injury.

Coach: Cheng Yaodong

No.	Pos.	Player	Date of birth (age)	Club
1	GK	Li Hao	6 March 2004 (aged 20)	(Royal Spanish Football Federation) Cornellà
2	DF	**Hu Hetao**	5 October 2003 (aged 20)	(Chinese Football Association) Chengdu Rongcheng
3	DF	**Liu Haofan**	23 October 2003 (aged 20)	(Chinese Football Association) Zhejiang
4	DF	Liang Shaowen	22 June 2002 (aged 21)	(Chinese Football Association) Beijing Guoan
5	DF	Zhu Yue	4 May 2001 (aged 22)	(Chinese Football Association) Shanghai Shenhua
6	MF	Ablahan Haliq	26 April 2001 (aged 22)	(Chinese Football Association) Wuhan Three Towns
7	MF	**Tao Qianglong**	20 November 2001 (aged 22)	(Chinese Football Association) Wuhan Three Towns
8	DF	Chen Yuhao	15 November 2001 (aged 22)	(Chinese Football Association) Wuhan Three Towns
9	FW	**Behram Abduweli**	8 March 2003 (aged 21)	(Chinese Football Association) Shenzhen Peng City
10	MF	Jia Feifan	13 January 2001 (aged 23)	(Chinese Football Association) Shandong Taishan
11	FW	Liu Junxian	25 January 2001 (aged 23)	(Chinese Football Association) Tianjin Jinmen Tiger
12	GK	Yu Jinyong	6 July 2004 (aged 19)	(Chinese Football Association) Shandong Taishan
13	DF	Jin Shunkai	19 October 2001 (aged 22)	(Chinese Football Association) Shanghai Shenhua
14	FW	**Wang Yudong**	23 November 2006 (aged 17)	(Chinese Football Association) Zhejiang
15	DF	Ruan Qilong	2 January 2001 (aged 23)	(Chinese Football Association) Beijing Guoan
16	DF	Yang Zihao	7 January 2001 (aged 23)	(Chinese Football Association) Tianjin Jinmen Tiger
17	FW	Afrden Asqer	15 September 2003 (aged 20)	(Chinese Football Association) Wuhan Three Towns
18	FW	Du Yuezheng	14 September 2005 (aged 18)	(Portuguese Football Federation) Juveforce
19	MF	Duan Dezhi	22 November 2001 (aged 22)	(Chinese Football Association) Suzhou Dongwu
20	MF	**Liu Zhurun**	6 October 2001 (aged 22)	(Chinese Football Association) Shanghai Port
21	MF	Xu Bin	2 May 2004 (aged 19)	(Chinese Football Association) Guangzhou FC
22	GK	Huang Zihao	9 June 2001 (aged 22)	(Chinese Football Association) Nanjing City
23	MF	**Xie Wenneng**	6 February 2001 (aged 23)	(Chinese Football Association) Shandong Taishan

=== Japan ===
Japan announced their final squad on 4 April 2024.

Coach: Go Oiwa

No.	Pos.	Player	Date of birth (age)	Caps	Goals	Club
1	GK	Leo Kokubo	23 January 2001 (age 25)	4	0	(Portuguese Football Federation) Benfica
2	DF	Riku Handa	1 January 2002 (age 24)	8	0	(Japan Football Association) Gamba Osaka
3	DF	Ryuya Nishio	16 May 2001 (age 25)	8	0	(Japan Football Association) Cerezo Osaka
4	DF	Hiroki Sekine	11 August 2002 (age 24)	9	0	(Japan Football Association) Kashiwa Reysol
5	DF	Seiji Kimura	24 August 2001 (age 25)	12	0	(Japan Football Association) Sagan Tosu
6	MF	Sota Kawasaki	30 July 2001 (age 25)	1	0	(Japan Football Association) Kyoto Sanga
7	MF	Rihito Yamamoto	12 December 2001 (age 24)	18	1	(Royal Belgian Football Association) Sint-Truiden
8	MF	**Joel Chima Fujita**	16 February 2002 (age 24)	21	1	(Royal Belgian Football Association) Sint-Truiden
9	FW	Shota Fujio	2 May 2001 (age 25)	14	4	(Japan Football Association) Machida Zelvia
10	MF	Kein Sato	11 July 2001 (age 25)	20	7	(German Football Association) Werder Bremen
11	MF	Fuki Yamada	10 July 2001 (age 25)	13	0	(Japan Football Association) Tokyo Verdy
12	GK	Taishi Brandon Nozawa	25 December 2002 (age 23)	2	0	(Japan Football Association) FC Tokyo
13	FW	Ryotaro Araki	29 January 2002 (age 24)	1	0	(Japan Football Association) FC Tokyo
14	MF	Satoshi Tanaka	13 August 2002 (age 24)	5	1	(Japan Football Association) Shonan Bellmare
15	DF	Kaito Suzuki	25 August 2002 (age 24)	9	2	(Japan Football Association) Júbilo Iwata
16	DF	Takashi Uchino	7 March 2001 (age 25)	17	0	(German Football Association) Fortuna Düsseldorf
17	MF	Kuryu Matsuki	30 April 2003 (age 23)	13	3	(Japan Football Association) FC Tokyo
18	FW	Kotaro Uchino	19 June 2004 (age 22)	6	5	(Japan Football Association) University of Tsukuba
19	FW	**Mao Hosoya**	7 September 2001 (age 25)	16	8	(Japan Football Association) Kashiwa Reysol
20	MF	Yu Hirakawa	3 January 2001 (age 25)	5	1	(Japan Football Association) Machida Zelvia
21	DF	Ayumu Ohata	27 April 2001 (age 25)	5	0	(Japan Football Association) Urawa Red Diamonds
22	DF	**Kota Takai**	4 September 2004 (age 22)	2	0	(Japan Football Association) Kawasaki Frontale
23	GK	Taiki Yamada	8 January 2002 (age 24)	0	0	(Japan Football Association) Kashima Antlers

=== South Korea ===
South Korea announced their final squad on 29 March 2024. Yang Hyun-jun was not released by his club and was replaced by Hong Si-hoo on 5 April 2024. Bae Jun-ho and Kim Ji-soo were not released by their clubs and were replaced by Choi Kang-min and Kim Dong-jin on 16 April.

Coach: Hwang Sun-hong

No.	Pos.	Player	Date of birth (age)	Club
1	GK	Kim Jeong-hoon	20 April 2001 (age 25)	(Korea Football Association) Jeonbuk Hyundai Motors
2	DF	Cho Hyun-taek	2 August 2001 (age 25)	(Korea Football Association) Gimcheon Sangmu
3	DF	**Hwang Jae-won**	16 August 2002 (age 24)	(Korea Football Association) Daegu FC
4	DF	**Seo Myung-gwan**	23 November 2002 (age 23)	(Korea Football Association) Bucheon FC 1995
5	DF	Byun Joon-soo	30 November 2001 (age 24)	(Korea Football Association) Gwangju FC
6	FW	Lee Young-joon	23 May 2003 (age 23)	(Korea Football Association) Gimcheon Sangmu
7	MF	Hong Si-hoo	8 January 2001 (age 25)	(Korea Football Association) Incheon United
8	MF	Lee Kang-hee	24 August 2001 (age 25)	(Korea Football Association) Gyeongnam FC
9	FW	An Jae-jun	3 April 2001 (age 25)	(Korea Football Association) Bucheon FC 1995
10	MF	Hong Yun-sang	19 March 2002 (age 24)	(Korea Football Association) Pohang Steelers
11	MF	**Jeong Sang-bin**	1 April 2002 (age 24)	(United States Soccer Federation) Minnesota United
12	GK	Baek Jong-bum	21 January 2001 (age 25)	(Korea Football Association) FC Seoul
13	MF	Paik Sang-hoon	7 January 2002 (age 24)	(Korea Football Association) FC Seoul
14	MF	Kang Sang-yoon	31 May 2004 (age 22)	(Korea Football Association) Suwon FC
15	DF	Lee Jae-won	5 May 2002 (age 24)	(Korea Football Association) Cheonan City
16	DF	Jang Si-young	31 March 2002 (age 24)	(Korea Football Association) Ulsan HD
17	MF	**Eom Ji-sung**	9 May 2002 (age 24)	(Korea Football Association) Gwangju FC
18	MF	**Kang Seong-jin**	26 March 2003 (age 23)	(Korea Football Association) FC Seoul
19	MF	Kim Min-woo	16 March 2002 (age 24)	(German Football Association) Fortuna Düsseldorf
20	MF	Choi Kang-min	24 April 2002 (age 24)	(Korea Football Association) Ulsan HD
21	GK	Shin Song-hoon	7 November 2002 (age 23)	(Korea Football Association) Chungnam Asan
22	DF	**Lee Tae-seok**	28 July 2002 (age 24)	(Korea Football Association) FC Seoul
23	MF	Kim Dong-jin	30 July 2003 (age 23)	(Korea Football Association) Pohang Steelers

=== United Arab Emirates ===
United Arab Emirates announced their a 30-men preliminary squad on 4 April 2024. Bader Nasser, Mohammed Abbas and Hazem Mohammad were not released by their clubs and were replaced by Ali Abdulaziz, Abdulla Abdelaziz and Abdullah Al-Hammadi on 16 April.

Coach: (Uruguay) Marcelo Broli

No.	Pos.	Player	Date of birth (age)	Club
1	GK	Rakan Al-Menhali	27 March 2001 (aged 23)	(United Arab Emirates Football Association) Al Jazira
2	DF	Mohammed Al-Maazmi	16 January 2001 (aged 23)	(United Arab Emirates Football Association) Hatta
3	DF	Mayed Al-Teneiji	21 June 2002 (aged 21)	(United Arab Emirates Football Association) Al Nasr
4	MF	Ahmed Al-Hammadi	6 January 2001 (aged 23)	(United Arab Emirates Football Association) Al Jazira
5	DF	Khamis Al-Mansoori	15 January 2004 (aged 20)	(United Arab Emirates Football Association) Baniyas
6	MF	Ali Abdulaziz	16 July 2003 (aged 20)	(United Arab Emirates Football Association) Al Nasr
7	FW	**Harib Abdalla**	26 November 2002 (aged 21)	(United Arab Emirates Football Association) Shabab Al Ahli
8	MF	Sultan Al Bedwawi	6 October 2001 (aged 22)	(United Arab Emirates Football Association) Hatta
9	FW	Mohamed Ibrahim	15 December 2002 (aged 21)	(United Arab Emirates Football Association) Ittihad Kalba
10	FW	Abdulla Abdelaziz	10 June 2002 (aged 21)	(United Arab Emirates Football Association) Ajman
11	FW	Yaser Al-Blooshi	6 January 2001 (aged 23)	(United Arab Emirates Football Association) Ittihad Kalba
12	MF	**Abdulla Hamad**	18 September 2001 (aged 22)	(United Arab Emirates Football Association) Al Wahda
13	DF	Abdulla Al-Balooshi	1 January 2001 (aged 23)	(United Arab Emirates Football Association) Al Nasr
14	DF	Mohammad Atiq	2 March 2001 (aged 23)	(United Arab Emirates Football Association) Shabab Al Ahli
15	FW	Abdulla Ahmed	13 June 2004 (aged 19)	(United Arab Emirates Football Association) Al Wahda
16	FW	Ahmed Fawzi	26 November 2001 (aged 22)	(United Arab Emirates Football Association) Al Jazira
17	GK	Hamad Al-Meqbali	13 July 2003 (aged 20)	(United Arab Emirates Football Association) Shabab Al Ahli
18	DF	**Mubarak Zamah**	29 November 2003 (aged 20)	(United Arab Emirates Football Association) Al Jazira
19	FW	Abdullah Al-Hammadi	20 March 2003 (aged 21)	(United Arab Emirates Football Association) Al Dhafra
20	FW	**Fahad Badr**	9 March 2001 (aged 23)	(United Arab Emirates Football Association) Emirates
21	FW	**Sultan Adil**	4 May 2004 (aged 19)	(United Arab Emirates Football Association) Ittihad Kalba
22	GK	**Khaled Tawhid**	16 February 2004 (aged 20)	(United Arab Emirates Football Association) Sharjah
23	DF	**Zayed Sultan**	11 April 2001 (aged 23)	(United Arab Emirates Football Association) Al Jazira

== Group C ==
=== Iraq ===
Iraq announced a 25-men preliminary squad on 3 April 2024. On 13 April, Mohammed Haitham and Omar Abdul-Mujbas withdrew injured and were replaced by Hassan Khalid and Amin Al-Hamawi.

Coach: Radhi Shenaishil

No.	Pos.	Player	Date of birth (age)	Caps	Goals	Club
1	GK	**Kumel Al-Rekabe**	19 August 2004 (age 22)	10	0	(Iraq Football Association) Naft Al-Basra
2	DF	**Josef Al-Imam**	27 July 2004 (age 22)	12	0	(Swedish Football Association) BK Olympic
3	DF	**Ahmed Maknzi**	24 September 2001 (age 25)	11	1	(Iraq Football Association) Erbil
4	DF	**Zaid Tahseen**	29 January 2001 (age 25)	17	1	(Iraq Football Association) Al-Talaba
5	DF	Hussein Amer	28 April 2002 (age 24)	8	0	(Iraq Football Association) Naft Maysan
6	DF	Roman Doulashi	7 August 2005 (age 21)	0	0	(German Football Association) Schalke 04
7	MF	**Ali Jassim**	20 January 2004 (age 22)	7	5	(Iraq Football Association) Al-Quwa Al-Jawiya
8	MF	Ali Almosawe	28 January 2002 (age 24)	8	2	(Portuguese Football Federation) Estrela
9	MF	Blnd Hassan	12 August 2003 (age 23)	10	4	(Royal Dutch Football Association) De Graafschap
10	MF	Nihad Mohammed	14 January 2001 (age 25)	12	0	(Iraq Football Association) Al-Talaba
11	MF	**Muntadher Mohammed**	5 June 2001 (age 25)	20	2	(Football Federation Islamic Republic of Iran) Mes Rafsanjan
12	GK	Hassan Abbas	6 January 2001 (age 25)	3	0	(Iraq Football Association) Amanat Baghdad
13	DF	Hassan Khalid	21 May 2003 (age 23)	1	0	(Iraq Football Association) Al-Karkh
14	MF	Karrar Mohammed Al-Mukhtar	6 January 2001 (age 25)	16	0	(Iraq Football Association) Al-Talaba
15	FW	**Amin Al-Hamawi**	17 December 2003 (age 22)	4	1	(Swedish Football Association) Helsingborg
16	MF	Muntadher Abdul-Amir	6 October 2001 (age 25)	20	1	(Iraq Football Association) Al-Zawraa
17	DF	**Mustafa Saadoon**	25 May 2001 (age 25)	11	1	(Iraq Football Association) Al-Quwa Al-Jawiya
18	FW	Ridha Fadhil	1 April 2001 (age 25)	12	6	(Iraq Football Association) Amanat Baghdad
19	FW	Salem Ahmad	24 March 2002 (age 24)	0	0	(Iraq Football Association) Al-Minaa
20	DF	Halo Fayaq	23 May 2001 (age 25)	2	1	(Iraq Football Association) Erbil
21	MF	**Zaid Ismail**	3 January 2002 (age 24)	9	0	(Iraq Football Association) Al-Talaba
22	GK	Hussein Hassan	15 November 2002 (age 23)	1	0	(Iraq Football Association) Al-Karkh
23	DF	Karrar Saad	7 March 2001 (age 25)	14	0	(Iraq Football Association) Al-Talaba

=== Saudi Arabia ===
Saudi Arabia announced their final squad on 29 March 2024.

Coach: Saad Al-Shehri

No.	Pos.	Player	Date of birth (age)	Caps	Goals	Club
1	GK	Abdulrahman Al-Sanbi	3 February 2001 (age 25)	16	0	(Saudi Arabian Football Federation) Al-Ahli
2	DF	**Mohammed Aboulshamat**	11 August 2002 (age 24)	23	1	(Saudi Arabian Football Federation) Al-Qadsiah
3	DF	Mohammed Sulaiman	8 April 2004 (age 22)	4	0	(Saudi Arabian Football Federation) Al-Ahli
4	DF	**Rayane Hamidou**	13 April 2002 (age 24)	18	1	(Saudi Arabian Football Federation) Al-Ahli
5	DF	Jehad Thakri	21 July 2001 (age 25)	3	0	(Saudi Arabian Football Federation) Al-Qadsiah
6	MF	**Eid Al-Muwallad**	14 December 2001 (age 24)	0	0	(Saudi Arabian Football Federation) Al-Okhdood
7	MF	Ziyad Al-Johani	11 November 2001 (age 24)	29	5	(Saudi Arabian Football Federation) Al-Ahli
8	MF	**Faisal Al-Ghamdi**	13 August 2001 (age 25)	22	1	(Saudi Arabian Football Federation) Al-Ittihad
9	FW	**Abdullah Radif**	20 January 2003 (age 23)	22	7	(Saudi Arabian Football Federation) Al-Shabab
10	MF	**Saad Al-Nasser**	8 January 2001 (age 25)	20	3	(Saudi Arabian Football Federation) Al-Taawoun
11	MF	**Ahmed Al-Ghamdi**	20 September 2001 (age 25)	31	7	(Saudi Arabian Football Federation) Al-Ittihad
12	DF	**Zakaria Hawsawi**	12 January 2001 (age 25)	16	1	(Saudi Arabian Football Federation) Al-Ittihad
13	DF	Mohammed Al-Dossari	1 April 2001 (age 25)	0	0	(Saudi Arabian Football Federation) Hajer
14	MF	**Awad Al-Nashri**	15 March 2002 (age 24)	21	0	(Saudi Arabian Football Federation) Al-Ittihad
15	DF	**Marwan Al-Sahafi**	17 February 2004 (age 22)	4	1	(Saudi Arabian Football Federation) Al-Ittihad
16	FW	**Mohammed Maran**	15 February 2001 (age 25)	36	15	(Saudi Arabian Football Federation) Al-Nassr
17	FW	**Haitham Asiri**	25 March 2001 (age 25)	21	7	(Saudi Arabian Football Federation) Al-Ahli
18	MF	Abdulelah Hawsawi	2 June 2001 (age 25)	3	0	(Saudi Arabian Football Federation) Al-Khaleej
19	DF	**Meshal Al-Sebyani**	11 April 2001 (age 25)	28	0	(Saudi Arabian Football Federation) Al-Faisaly
20	MF	Saleh Aboulshamat	11 August 2002 (age 24)	12	0	(Saudi Arabian Football Federation) Al-Taawoun
21	GK	Ahmed Al Jubaya	26 October 2001 (age 24)	13	0	(Saudi Arabian Football Federation) Al-Qadsiah
22	GK	Mohammed Al-Absi	24 September 2002 (age 24)	7	0	(Saudi Arabian Football Federation) Al-Shabab
23	MF	**Ayman Yahya**	14 May 2001 (age 25)	12	4	(Saudi Arabian Football Federation) Al-Nassr

=== Tajikistan ===
Tajikistan announced a 24-men preliminary squad on 3 April 2024.

Coach: Mubin Ergashev

No.	Pos.	Player	Date of birth (age)	Club
1	GK	Safarmad Gafforov	14 April 2004 (age 22)	(Tajikistan Football Federation) Khujand
2	DF	Jonibek Sharipov	15 January 2002 (age 24)	(Tajikistan Football Federation) CSKA Pamir
3	DF	**Rakhmatsho Rakhmatzoda**	6 April 2004 (age 22)	(Tajikistan Football Federation) Ravshan
4	DF	Khaydar Sattorov	18 February 2003 (age 23)	(Tajikistan Football Federation) Khatlon
5	DF	**Manuchekhr Safarov**	31 May 2001 (age 25)	(Uzbekistan Football Association) Neftchi Fergana
6	DF	**Fakhriddin Akhtamov**	26 November 2004 (age 21)	(Tajikistan Football Federation) Khujand
7	FW	**Daler Sharipov**	13 February 2004 (age 22)	(Uzbekistan Football Association) Metallurg
8	MF	Shukhrat Elmurodov	31 January 2002 (age 24)	(Tajikistan Football Federation) Regar-TadAZ
9	FW	**Rustam Soirov**	12 September 2002 (age 24)	(Tajikistan Football Federation) Istiklol
10	MF	**Ruslan Khayloev**	29 October 2003 (age 22)	(Russian Football Union) Tyumen
11	MF	Shokhrukh Sangov	31 October 2002 (age 23)	(Tajikistan Football Federation) Khosilot
12	DF	**Sodikjon Kurbonov**	19 January 2003 (age 23)	(Tajikistan Football Federation) Istiklol
13	MF	**Amadoni Kamolov**	16 January 2003 (age 23)	(Tajikistan Football Federation) Istiklol
14	MF	**Alisher Shukurov**	30 March 2002 (age 24)	(Georgian Football Federation) Dinamo Tbilisi
15	DF	**Mekhrubon Karimov**	9 January 2004 (age 22)	(Georgian Football Federation) Samgurali
16	GK	Mukhammadrabi Rakhmatulloev	28 July 2002 (age 24)	(Tajikistan Football Federation) Ravshan
17	MF	Tokhirdzhon Tagoyzoda	9 October 2001 (age 24)	(Tajikistan Football Federation) Khosilot
18	MF	Azizbek Khaitov	6 April 2003 (age 23)	(Tajikistan Football Federation) Ravshan
19	FW	Mekhron Madaminov	1 May 2002 (age 24)	(Tajikistan Football Federation) Istiklol
20	DF	Bekmurod Khaytov	21 December 2003 (age 22)	(Tajikistan Football Federation) Khatlon
21	MF	Jomi Nazarov	8 December 2001 (age 24)	(Royal Spanish Football Federation) Sarrià
22	FW	**Shahrom Samiev**	8 February 2001 (age 25)	(Uzbekistan Football Association) Andijon
23	GK	**Mukhriddin Khasanov**	23 September 2002 (age 24)	(Tajikistan Football Federation) Istiklol

=== Thailand ===
Thailand announced their final squad on 4 April 2024.

Coach: Issara Sritaro

No.	Pos.	Player	Date of birth (age)	Caps	Goals	Club
1	GK	Soponwit Rakyart	25 January 2001 (age 25)	7	0	(Football Association of Thailand) Muangthong United
2	DF	Phongsakon Trisat	19 March 2001 (age 25)	16	0	(Football Association of Thailand) Chonburi
3	DF	Warinthon Jamnongwat	6 April 2002 (age 24)	8	0	(Football Association of Thailand) Chainat Hornbill
4	DF	**Kritsada Nontharat**	16 February 2001 (age 25)	15	0	(Football Association of Thailand) Bangkok United
5	DF	Chonnapat Buaphan	22 March 2004 (age 22)	16	2	(Football Association of Thailand) BG Pathum United
6	DF	**Songwut Kraikruan**	6 November 2001 (age 24)	4	0	(Football Association of Thailand) Muangthong United
7	MF	Settasit Suvannaseat	6 March 2002 (age 24)	7	0	(Football Association of Thailand) Chiangrai United
8	FW	**Teerasak Poeiphimai**	21 September 2002 (age 24)	25	9	(Football Association of Thailand) Port
9	FW	Guntapon Keereeleang	22 January 2001 (age 25)	4	1	(Football Association of Thailand) Bangkok United
10	FW	**Chitsanupong Choti**	29 September 2001 (age 25)	6	1	(Football Association of Thailand) Khonkaen United
11	MF	Erawan Garnier	5 January 2006 (age 20)	0	0	(French Football Federation) Lyon
12	DF	Waris Choolthong	8 January 2004 (age 22)	9	0	(Football Association of Thailand) BG Pathum United
13	DF	Pattarapon Suksakit	19 August 2003 (age 23)	1	0	(Football Association of Thailand) Sukhothai
14	MF	**Purachet Thodsanit**	9 May 2001 (age 25)	21	4	(Football Association of Thailand) Muangthong United
15	MF	Natcha Promsomboon	8 February 2001 (age 25)	7	0	(Football Association of Thailand) Ayutthaya United
16	MF	**Seksan Ratree**	14 March 2003 (age 23)	5	0	(Football Association of Thailand) Buriram United
17	FW	Chukid Wanpraphao	2 July 2001 (age 25)	8	2	(Football Association of Thailand) Ayutthaya United
18	MF	Sittha Boonlha	2 September 2004 (age 22)	17	1	(Football Association of Thailand) Port
19	DF	Phon-Ek Jensen	30 May 2003 (age 23)	2	0	(Football Association of Thailand) PT Prachuap
20	GK	Thirawooth Sruanson	10 November 2001 (age 24)	9	0	(Football Association of Thailand) Kasetsart
21	MF	Songkhramsamut Namphueng	7 November 2003 (age 22)	3	0	(Football Association of Thailand) Police Tero
22	DF	Thanison Paibulkijcharoen	19 February 2002 (age 24)	7	0	(Football Association of Thailand) Chiangmai United
23	GK	Siriwat Ingkaew	11 January 2001 (age 25)	3	0	(Football Association of Thailand) Phrae United

== Group D ==
=== Kuwait ===
Kuwait announced a 25-men preliminary squad on 4 April 2024. On 17 April, Abdullah Al-Awadi and Bader Al-Mutairi were replaced by Hamad Al-Taweel and Jarah Al-Hilali.

Coach: (Portugal) Emílio Peixe

No.	Pos.	Player	Date of birth (age)	Club
1	GK	Abdulrahman Al-Fadhli	23 March 2001 (age 25)	(Kuwait Football Association) Al-Salmiya
2	DF	**Mohsen Ghareeb**	11 November 2004 (age 21)	(Kuwait Football Association) Al-Kuwait
3	DF	Faisal Al-Shatti	19 May 2002 (age 24)	(Kuwait Football Association) Al-Qadsia
4	DF	Youssef Al-Haqqan	5 February 2002 (age 24)	(Kuwait Football Association) Al-Qadsia
5	DF	Abdulrahman Al-Daihani	21 January 2001 (age 25)	(Kuwait Football Association) Al-Qadsia
6	DF	Khaled Al-Fadhli	23 February 2002 (age 24)	(Kuwait Football Association) Al-Qadsia
7	FW	**Ibrahim Kameel**	10 June 2002 (age 24)	(Kuwait Football Association) Al-Kuwait
8	MF	Fahad Al-Fadhli	4 February 2001 (age 25)	(Kuwait Football Association) Kazma
9	FW	**Salman Al-Awadi**	21 May 2001 (age 25)	(Kuwait Football Association) Al-Arabi
10	MF	**Hussain Ashkanani**	26 January 2002 (age 24)	(Kuwait Football Association) Al-Arabi
11	DF	Abdulrahman Karam	15 March 2001 (age 25)	(Kuwait Football Association) Al-Arabi
12	FW	Hamad Al-Taweel	26 July 2001 (age 25)	(Kuwait Football Association) Khaitan
13	MF	**Sultan Al-Faraj**	16 June 2001 (age 25)	(Kuwait Football Association) Al-Kuwait
14	MF	Saleh Faisal	18 November 2003 (age 22)	(Kuwait Football Association) Kazma
15	FW	Abdulaziz Asaad	28 January 2002 (age 24)	(Kuwait Football Association) Al-Jahra
16	MF	**Mahdi Dashti**	26 October 2001 (age 24)	(Kuwait Football Association) Al-Salmiya
17	FW	Talal Al-Qaissi	21 June 2002 (age 24)	(Kuwait Football Association) Kazma
18	MF	Montaser Suleiman	17 May 2005 (age 21)	(Kuwait Football Association) Kazma
19	FW	Jarah Al-Hilali	29 February 2004 (age 22)	(Kuwait Football Association) Kazma
20	FW	**Muath Al-Enezi**	16 July 2003 (age 23)	(Kuwait Football Association) Al-Salmiya
21	FW	Abdulrahman Al-Rashidi	12 January 2004 (age 22)	(Kuwait Football Association) Al-Nasr
22	GK	**Abdulrahman Kameel**	8 March 2001 (age 25)	(Kuwait Football Association) Al-Qadsia
23	GK	Abdulrahman Al-Harbi	3 October 2003 (age 23)	(Kuwait Football Association) Al-Tadamon

=== Malaysia ===
Malaysia announced a 28-men preliminary squad on 12 March 2024. The final squad was announced on 1 April 2024. Aiman Afif withdrew injured on 8 April and was replaced by Azrin Afiq.

Coach: (Spain) Juan Torres Garrido

No.	Pos.	Player	Date of birth (age)	Club
1	GK	Firdaus Irman	23 July 2001 (age 25)	(Football Association of Malaysia) Perak
2	DF	Aiman Yusni	11 May 2002 (age 24)	(Football Association of Malaysia) Perak
3	DF	Ubaidullah Shamsul	30 November 2003 (age 22)	(Football Association of Malaysia) Terengganu
4	MF	Muhammad Abu Khalil	11 April 2005 (age 21)	(Football Association of Malaysia) Selangor
5	DF	**Harith Haiqal**	22 June 2002 (age 24)	(Football Association of Malaysia) Selangor
6	DF	**Najmuddin Akmal**	11 January 2003 (age 23)	(Football Association of Malaysia) Johor Darul Ta'zim
7	MF	**Mukhairi Ajmal**	7 November 2001 (age 24)	(Football Association of Malaysia) Selangor
8	MF	T. Saravanan	26 February 2001 (age 25)	(Football Association of Malaysia) Sri Pahang
9	FW	**Aliff Izwan**	10 February 2004 (age 22)	(Football Association of Malaysia) Selangor
10	FW	**Luqman Hakim Shamsudin**	5 March 2002 (age 24)	(Japan Football Association) YSCC Yokohama
11	FW	Alif Zikri	4 September 2002 (age 24)	(Football Association of Malaysia) Perak
12	MF	**Nooa Laine**	22 November 2002 (age 23)	(Football Association of Malaysia) Selangor
13	DF	Umar Hakeem	26 August 2002 (age 24)	(Football Association of Malaysia) Johor Darul Ta'zim
14	DF	Zikri Khalili	22 June 2002 (age 24)	(Football Association of Malaysia) Selangor
15	FW	**Fergus Tierney**	19 March 2003 (age 23)	(Football Association of Malaysia) Johor Darul Ta'zim
16	GK	Azim Al-Amin	20 September 2001 (age 25)	(Football Association of Malaysia) Selangor
17	MF	Syahir Bashah	16 September 2001 (age 25)	(Football Association of Malaysia) Selangor
18	MF	**Daryl Sham**	30 November 2002 (age 23)	(Football Association of Malaysia) Johor Darul Ta'zim
19	DF	**Safwan Mazlan**	22 February 2002 (age 24)	(Football Association of Malaysia) Terengganu
20	DF	Azrin Afiq	6 January 2002 (age 24)	(Football Association of Malaysia) Negeri Sembilan
21	MF	Saiful Jamaluddin	28 May 2002 (age 24)	(Football Association of Malaysia) Sri Pahang
22	MF	**Haqimi Azim**	6 January 2003 (age 23)	(Football Association of Malaysia) Kuala Lumpur City
23	GK	**Sikh Izhan**	22 March 2002 (age 24)	(Football Association of Malaysia) Penang

=== Uzbekistan ===
Uzbekistan announced a 26-men preliminary squad on 1 April 2024. The final squad was announced on 9 April 2024. On 17 April, Odil Abdumajidov, Akhmadullo Mukimzhonov, Bekhruz Askarov and Pulatkhuzha Kholdorkhonov were replaced by Abdukodir Khusanov, Ibrokhimkhalil Yuldoshev, Khojimat Erkinov and Abbosbek Fayzullaev.

Coach: Timur Kapadze

No.	Pos.	Player	Date of birth (age)	Caps	Goals	Club
1	GK	**Abduvohid Nematov**	20 March 2001 (age 25)	18	0	(Uzbekistan Football Association) Nasaf
2	DF	Saidazamat Mirsaidov	19 July 2001 (age 25)	20	1	(Uzbekistan Football Association) Olympic Tashkent
3	DF	**Zafarmurod Abdurakhmatov**	28 April 2003 (age 23)	0	0	(Uzbekistan Football Association) Nasaf
4	DF	**Abdukodir Khusanov**	29 February 2004 (age 22)	3	0	(French Football Federation) Lens
5	DF	**Mukhammadkodir Khamraliev**	6 July 2001 (age 25)	26	1	(Uzbekistan Football Association) Pakhtakor
6	DF	**Ibrokhimkhalil Yuldoshev**	14 February 2001 (age 25)	13	0	(Kazakhstan Football Federation) Kairat
7	FW	**Khojimat Erkinov**	29 May 2001 (age 25)	16	1	(United Arab Emirates Football Association) Al-Wahda
8	MF	Ibrokhim Ibrokhimov	12 January 2001 (age 25)	18	0	(Uzbekistan Football Association) Olympic Tashkent
9	FW	Ulugbek Khoshimov	3 January 2001 (age 25)	26	9	(Uzbekistan Football Association) Surkhon
10	MF	**Jasurbek Jaloliddinov** (captain)	15 May 2002 (age 24)	36	10	(Uzbekistan Football Association) Neftchi Fergana
11	FW	Otabek Jurakuziev	2 April 2002 (age 24)	24	6	(Uzbekistan Football Association) Olympic Tashkent
12	GK	Vladimir Nazarov	8 June 2002 (age 24)	20	0	(Uzbekistan Football Association) Pakhtakor
13	DF	Makhmud Makhamadzhonov	30 June 2003 (age 23)	11	1	(Uzbekistan Football Association) Bunyodkor
14	MF	**Abbosbek Fayzullaev**	3 October 2003 (age 23)	11	3	(Russian Football Union) CSKA Moscow
15	MF	Umarali Rakhmonaliev	18 August 2003 (age 23)	8	2	(Russian Football Union) Rubin Kazan
16	DF	Asadbek Rakhimzhonov	17 February 2004 (age 22)	9	0	(Uzbekistan Football Association) Olympic Tashkent
17	MF	**Diyor Kholmatov**	22 July 2002 (age 24)	15	1	(Uzbekistan Football Association) Pakhtakor
18	DF	**Alibek Davronov**	28 December 2002 (age 23)	19	3	(Uzbekistan Football Association) Nasaf
19	FW	**Khusayin Norchaev**	6 February 2002 (age 24)	24	11	(Uzbekistan Football Association) Neftchi Fergana
20	FW	**Ruslanbek Jiyanov**	5 June 2001 (age 25)	29	2	(Uzbekistan Football Association) Navbahor
21	GK	Khamidullo Abdunabiev	20 August 2002 (age 24)	7	0	(Uzbekistan Football Association) Olympic Tashkent
22	FW	Alisher Odilov	15 July 2001 (age 25)	27	10	(Uzbekistan Football Association) Olympic Tashkent
23	MF	Abdurauf Buriev	20 July 2002 (age 24)	26	0	(Uzbekistan Football Association) Olympic Tashkent

=== Vietnam ===
Vietnam announced a 28-men preliminary squad on 1 April 2024. On 4 April, Nguyễn Thanh Nhàn withdrew injured and was replaced by Nguyễn Văn Tùng. The squad was reduced to 27 players on 7 April after Phan Tuấn Tài withdrew injured. On 15 April, Nguyễn Thành Khải, Hà Văn Phương and Trần Trung Kiên were replaced by Nguyễn Hồng Phúc, Nguyễn Đức Phú, Đoàn Huy Hoàng and Nguyễn Văn Trường.

Coach: Hoàng Anh Tuấn

No.	Pos.	Player	Date of birth (age)	Caps	Goals	Club
1	GK	Quan Văn Chuẩn (captain)	7 January 2001 (age 25)	28	0	(Vietnam Football Federation) Hà Nội
2	DF	Nguyễn Hồng Phúc	31 May 2003 (age 23)	6	1	(Vietnam Football Federation) Thể Công-Viettel
3	DF	Trần Quang Thịnh	12 May 2001 (age 25)	20	0	(Vietnam Football Federation) LPBank HAGL
4	DF	**Lương Duy Cương**	7 November 2001 (age 24)	28	0	(Vietnam Football Federation) SHB Đà Nẵng
5	DF	Lê Nguyên Hoàng	14 February 2005 (age 21)	9	0	(Vietnam Football Federation) Sông Lam Nghệ An
6	MF	**Võ Hoàng Minh Khoa**	12 March 2001 (age 25)	13	0	(Vietnam Football Federation) Becamex Bình Dương
7	MF	**Hoàng Văn Toản**	1 April 2001 (age 25)	7	1	(Vietnam Football Federation) Công An Hà Nội
8	MF	Nguyễn Đức Việt	1 January 2004 (age 22)	18	0	(Vietnam Football Federation) LPBank HAGL
9	FW	Nguyễn Quốc Việt	4 May 2003 (age 23)	22	5	(Vietnam Football Federation) LPBank HAGL
10	FW	Võ Nguyên Hoàng	7 February 2002 (age 24)	8	1	(Vietnam Football Federation) Đông Á Thanh Hóa
11	FW	**Bùi Vĩ Hào**	24 February 2003 (age 23)	13	3	(Vietnam Football Federation) Becamex Bình Dương
12	MF	**Nguyễn Văn Trường**	10 September 2003 (age 23)	17	0	(Vietnam Football Federation) Hà Nội
13	GK	**Nguyễn Văn Việt**	12 July 2002 (age 24)	4	0	(Vietnam Football Federation) Sông Lam Nghệ An
14	FW	**Nguyễn Văn Tùng**	7 December 2001 (age 24)	24	11	(Vietnam Football Federation) Hà Nội
15	FW	**Nguyễn Đình Bắc**	19 August 2004 (age 22)	7	1	(Vietnam Football Federation) Quảng Nam
16	DF	**Hồ Văn Cường**	15 January 2003 (age 23)	13	3	(Vietnam Football Federation) Công An Hà Nội
17	MF	Nguyễn Đức Phú	13 January 2003 (age 23)	13	0	(Vietnam Football Federation) PVF-CAND
18	MF	**Khuất Văn Khang**	11 May 2003 (age 23)	24	2	(Vietnam Football Federation) Thể Công-Viettel
19	MF	**Nguyễn Thái Sơn**	13 July 2003 (age 23)	13	1	(Vietnam Football Federation) Đông Á Thanh Hóa
20	DF	Nguyễn Ngọc Thắng	2 August 2002 (age 24)	14	1	(Vietnam Football Federation) Hồng Lĩnh Hà Tĩnh
21	DF	Nguyễn Mạnh Hưng	8 August 2005 (age 21)	6	0	(Vietnam Football Federation) Trường Tươi Bình Phước
22	FW	Nguyễn Minh Quang	3 February 2001 (age 25)	8	1	(Vietnam Football Federation) SHB Đà Nẵng
23	GK	Đoàn Huy Hoàng	18 June 2003 (age 23)	4	0	(Vietnam Football Federation) Trường Tươi Bình Phước
