= Kumel Al-Rekabe =

Iraqi footballer

Personal information
- Full name: Kumel Saadi Latif Al-Rekabe
- Date of birth: 19 August 2004 (age 22)
- Place of birth: Aarau, Switzerland
- Height: 1.93 m (6 ft 4 in)
- Position: Goalkeeper

Team information
- Current team: Duhok SC

Youth career
- –2021: Adliswil Youth
- 2021-2022: FC Zurich

Senior career*
Years	Team	Apps	(Gls)
2019–2020	Adliswil	1	(0)
2022–2023	Red Star Zurich	3	(0)
2024	Naft Al Basra	3	(0)
2024–2025	Leganés	0	(0)
2025–2025	Ariana	0	(0)
2025–2026	Erbil SC	0	(0)
2026–	Duhok SC	0	(0)

International career^{‡}
2023–2025	Iraq U23	10	(0)
2026–	Iraq	1	(0)
Medal record
Men's football
Representing Iraq
AFC U-23 Asian Cup
Bronze medal – third place	2024 Qatar	Team
- * Club domestic league appearances and goals as of 4 July 2024 ‡ National team caps and goals as of 14:27, 1 June 2026 (UTC)

Kumel Saadi Latif Al-Rekabe (Arabic: كميل سعدي لطيف الركابي; born 19 August 2004) is a professional footballer who plays as a goalkeeper for Duhok SC. Born in Switzerland, he plays for the Iraq national team.

== Club career ==
=== Early career in Switzerland ===
Born in Switzerland, to Iraqi parents Al-Rekabe joined the youth ranks of FC Adliswil. He made his senior debut on 10 October 2020, in a heavy 7–0 defeat against Lachen/Altendorf. On 1 July 2021, he joined FC Zurich, where he was assigned to the u17 team. After spending a season in the youth side, he moved to fifth division side Red Star Zurich for the 2022–2023 season. He made his debut on 9 October 2022, in a 2–1 win over FC Unterstrass. He made a further two appearances that season as his team finished 4th in the table.

=== Naft Al Basra ===
In early 2024, Al-Rekabe joined Iraqi team Naft Al Basra. He made his debut against Al Mina'a during a 2–1 loss in the Basra Derby. He made two more appearances that season as Naft Al Basra narrowly avoided relegation. He left the club at the end of the season.

=== CD Leganés International Academy ===
In August 2024, joined Leganés' International Academy through an intermediary company after his contract with Naft Al-Basra club came to an end. The keeper underwent a trial before impressing club scouts and signed a contract.

== International career ==
=== Iraq U23 ===
Born in Switzerland, Al-Rekabe is eligible to represent both Switzerland and Iraq.

Al-Rekabe was called up to the 2023 WAFF U-23 Championship, where he won best goalkeeper on route to Iraq winning the title. Despite these accolades, he was the subject of criticism for his performance and blunders.

Al-Rekabe was called up to the 2024 Asian Cup U23 qualifiers, held in Kuwait, in which Iraq topped the group and qualified, he kept a clean sheet against Macau, and featured in the 2–2 draw against Kuwait. He was also called up to the final tournament, but did not feature in any match as Iraq finished 3rd overall and qualified to the 2024 Olympic Games.

In June 2024, he was named in the final squad for the Olympic Games, but did not make an appearance as Iraq crashed out from the group stage.

=== Senior team ===
In June 2024, Al-Rekabe was a surprise inclusion in Iraq's World Cup qualification squad to face Indonesia and Vietnam. He was an unused substitute as Iraq went on to win both games and finish top of their group.

Al-Rekabe was included in the preliminary squad for the 26th Arabian Gulf Cup.

== Personal life ==
He was born and raised in Switzerland. His older brother Aile Al-Rekabe, also known as Alawi, is a Swiss rapper. He also shares a passion for football with him. Since 24 January 2026, he has been married to Jasmina Lang, who was also born and raised in Aargau, Switzerland.

== Honours ==
Iraq U-23

- WAFF U-23 Championship: 2023

Individual

- WAFF U-23 Championship Best goalkeeper: 2023
