= Amin Al-Hamawi =

Iraqi footballer (born 2003)

Personal information
- Full name: Amin Raafat Ali Al-Hamawi
- Date of birth: 17 December 2003 (age 22)
- Place of birth: Iraq
- Height: 1.80 m (5 ft 11 in)
- Position: Forward

Team information
- Current team: Helsingborgs IF (loan)

Youth career
- 2012–2022: Helsingborgs IF

Senior career*
Years	Team	Apps	(Gls)
2022–2024	Helsingborgs IF	37	(7)
2022	→ Torns IF (loan)	11	(7)
2024–2025	Sandvikens IF	21	(8)
2025	Wisła Płock	13	(3)
2025	Wisła Płock II	1	(0)
2025–	Randers	5	(0)
2026–	→ Helsingborgs IF (loan)	4	(0)

International career^{‡}
2022–2024	Iraq U23	10	(1)
2023–	Iraq	3	(0)
Medal record
Men's football
Representing Iraq
AFC U-23 Asian Cup
Bronze medal – third place	2024 Qatar	Team
- * Club domestic league appearances and goals as of 12 November 2026 ‡ National team caps and goals as of 8 February 2025

Amin Raafat Ali Al-Hamawi (Arabic: امين الحماوي; born 17 December 2003) is an Iraqi professional footballer who plays as a striker for Superettan club Helsingborgs IF, on loan from Randers and the Iraq national team.

== Club career ==
=== Helsingborgs IF ===
Spending his entire youth career at local club Helsingborgs IF having joined the academy as an 8-year-old, Al-Hamawi signed his first professional contract with the team in March 2022 after scoring 24 goals in 23 matches for the U19 side, where he was vice-captain, the previous season.

==== Loan to Torns IF ====
Immediately after signing his first professional contract, Al-Hamawi was loaned out to third-tier club Torns IF, where he quickly impressed, starting 4 matches and scoring 3 goals in the Ettan.

==== Return from loan, first team breakthrough ====
After impressing during his loan spell at Torns IF, Amin was recalled to his parent club in June 2022 and made his Allsvenskan debut against Malmö FF on 27 June, coming on as a substitute in the 69th minute. He scored his first senior goal in a 3–1 defeat to Varberg BoIS on 15 October 2022. The club struggled to compete that season, finishing in 15th place and getting relegated from the first tier. Troubles for the team continued the following season, where they once again were embroiled in a relegation battle, Amin's 5 league goals were vital in avoiding relegation, as the team confirmed their place in the Superettan on goal difference

Amin's contract was not renewed at the conclusion of the season, marking the end of his journey with his Helsingborgs IF.

=== Sandvikens IF ===
On 9 May 2024, Amin signed for Superettan side Sandvikens IF on a three-year deal. He made his debut ten days later, coming on as a second-half substitute against Varbergs BoIS. On 26 May, Amin scored his first goal for the club against Örgryte IS in an eventual 3–1 win. He scored eight goals in 21 appearances in his first season, as his team finished 6th in the league.

=== Wisła Płock ===
On 19 February 2025, he was transferred to Polish I liga club Wisła Płock on a deal until June 2027.

=== Randers ===
On 28 August 2025, Al-Hamawi moved to Danish Superliga club Randers for an undisclosed fee, signing a four-year contract.

=== Helsingborg (loan) ===
On 31 August 2026, Al-Hamawi was loaned out to Swedish side Helsingborgs IF for the rest of 2026.

== International career ==
Born in Iraq and moving to Sweden as an infant, Al-Hamawi chose to represent his country of birth internationally.

=== Under-23 ===
Amin received his first call-up for the U-23s in January 2022 for a training camp in Antalya, Turkey in preparation for the 2022 AFC U-23 Asian Cup, which he also made the final squad for despite not making an appearance at the tournament. He made his official debut in a friendly match against Iran in May 2022, coming on in the second half. He scored his first goal in a friendly match against Morocco in Dec 2023.

Amin was called up to Iraq's roster for the 2024 AFC U-23 Asian Cup. He appeared in five of the six matches that Iraq played in the tournament, contributing two assists in a 4–2 win over Tajikistan. Iraq went on to beat Indonesia to win the bronze medal which qualified them for the 2024 Olympic games.

=== Senior career ===
Amin was called up to the Iraqi senior team for the first time for the 2023 King's Cup, a friendly 4-team tournament in Thailand. He made his debut against India, coming on at halftime in an eventual penalty win after a 2–2 draw. He started the following game against Thailand, but was subbed off at halftime as Iraq went on to win the title on penalties.

Amin was called up to the Iraq squad for the 2026 World Cup qualifiers.

== Career statistics ==
=== International ===
As of match played 28 December 2024

Appearances and goals by national team and year
National team	Year	Apps	Goals
Iraq	2023	2	0
Iraq	2024	1	0
Total		3	0
