= Nihad Mohammed =

Iraqi footballer

Personal information
- Full name: Nihad Muhammad Owaid Watif
- Date of birth: 14 January 2001 (age 25)
- Place of birth: Iraq
- Height: 1.80 m (5 ft 11 in)
- Position: Left winger

Team information
- Current team: Al Kahraba

Youth career
- –2020: Al Quwa Al Jawiya

Senior career*
Years	Team	Apps	(Gls)
2020–2022	Al Quwa Al Jawiya	0	(0)
2020–2021	→ Al Qasim (loan)		(1)
2021	→ Al-Diwaniya SC (loan)		(3)
2021-2022	→ Naft Maysan SC (loan)		(3)
2022-2023	Al Karkh	36	(9)
2023–2025	Al Talaba	39	(2)
2025 -	Al Kahraba	2	(2)

International career^{‡}
2020	Iraq U19	2	(0)
2021–	Iraq U23	14	(0)
Medal record
Men's football
Representing Iraq
AFC U-23 Asian Cup
Bronze medal – third place	2024 Qatar	Team
- * Club domestic league appearances and goals as of 3 February 2025 ‡ National team caps and goals as of 26 March 2024

Nihad Muhammad Owaid Watif (born 14 January 2001) is an Iraqi footballer who plays as a left winger for Al-Talaba in Iraq Premier League.

== Club career ==
=== Early career and loan spells ===
Nihad hails from the city of Hillah in the Babylon. As a youngster, he joined the youth ranks of Al Quwa Al Jawiya.

In 2020, he joined Al Qasim on a short-term loan. He scored his first professional goal against Naft Al Basrah. upon his return in the winter window, he went on to join Al Diwaniya for the remained of the season. He was vital in his team avoiding relegation from the Premier League by scoring a winner against Al Mina'a in July and another against Al Samawa in the final match of the season.

The following season, he joined Naft Maysan on loan. On 27 December 2021, he scored his first goal for the club in a 1–0 win over Al Talaba. Nihad was a fixture in the side as his team finished 12th

=== Al Karkh ===
Ahead of the 2022–2023 season, Nihad joined Al Karkh on a permeant deal. He scored his first goal on matchday six in a defeat to Al Kahraba Nihad had a breakout year with Al Karkh, scoring 9 goals and helping his team to a 12th-place finish and a semi final appearance in the FA Cup.

=== Al Talaba ===
Following his impressive season with Al Karkh, he joined Iraqi side Al-Talaba. He scored his first goal against his former club Al Quwa Al Jawiya, in a 1–1 draw. On 7 August 2024 he renewed his contract with Al-Talaba. He struggled with Injury in his second season with the club, and was out of the squad for the majority of the first half of the season. He left the team in the winter transfer window.

=== Al Kahraba ===
On 27 January, Mohammed joined Al-Kahraba on a permanent move from Al-Talaba. He made his debut three days later, missing a penalty but still managing to score a brace, including a last minute goal in order to give his team a 2–1 win over Al Mina'a.

== International career ==
=== Iraq U23 ===
Nihad was called up to the 2023 WAFF U-23 Championship held in Iraq. He was awarded man of the match in the semi final against Oman. Iraq beat Iran in the final on penalties. Nihad was called up to the Asian Cup U23 Qualifiers, held in Kuwait, in which Iraq topped the group and qualified. He was also called up to the tournament proper. Nihad received a red card against Thailand as Iraq lost 2–1, but returned to the side in the knockout stages, helping the team finish in 3rd place and qualify to the 2024 Summer Olympic Games football Tournament.

In June 2024, he was called up to the Olympic Squad.
