= 2023 WAFF U-23 Championship =

بطولة غرب آسيا لكرة القدم تحت 23 عاما
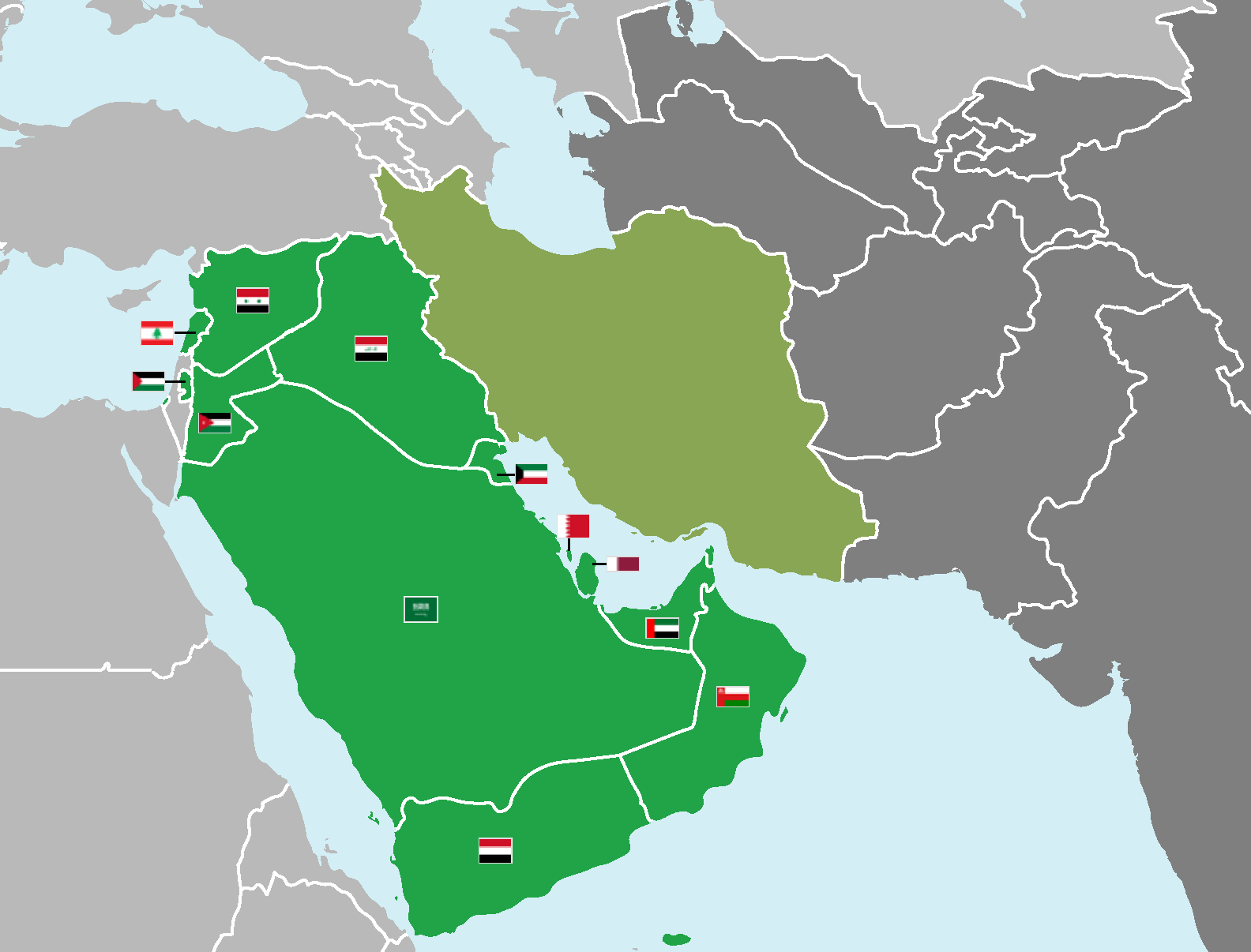
- The Al-Madina Stadium in Al-Habibiya, Baghdad will host the matches

Tournament details
- Host country: Iraq
- Cities: Baghdad and Karbala
- Dates: 12–20 June
- Teams: 9 (from 1 confederation) (from 2 sub-confederations)
- Venues: 2 (in 2 host cities)

Final positions
- Champions: Iraq (1st title)
- Runners-up: Iran

Tournament statistics
- Matches played: 12
- Goals scored: 27 (2.25 per match)
- Top scorer(s): (Iraq) Hussein Abdullah (3 goals)
- Best player: (Iraq) Muntadher Mohammed
- Best goalkeeper: (Iraq) Kumel Al-Rekabe

The 2023 WAFF U-23 Championship was the fourth edition of the WAFF U-23 Championship, the international age-restricted football championship organized by the West Asian Football Federation for the men's under-23 national teams of West Asia. Nine teams competed in the tournament, with one team being invited.

Saudi Arabia, the defending champions, did not take part in the tournament. Iraq won their first title after defeating Iran 5–4 on penalties (1–1 after extra time) in the final.

== Teams ==
Nine teams took part in the competition.

Team	Appearance	Previous best performance
Iran	2nd	Winners (2015)
Iraq	2nd	Semi-finals (2021)
Jordan	3rd	Winners (2021)
Lebanon	3rd	Group stage (2021, 2022)
Oman	4th	Fourth place (2022)
Palestine	3rd	Group stage (2015, 2021)
Syria	4th	Runners-up (2015)
United Arab Emirates	3rd	Group stage (2015, 2021)
Yemen	3rd	Fourth place (2015)

=== Draw ===
The draw for the group stage took place on Thursday 25 May 2023 in Muscat, Oman at 15:00 UTC+3.

Group A
Pos	Team
A1	Iraq
A2	United Arab Emirates
A3	Jordan

Group B
Pos	Team
B1	Palestine
B2	Iran
B3	Syria

Group C
Pos	Team
C1	Lebanon
C2	Yemen
C3	Oman

=== Squads ===
Each team had to register a squad of 25 players, three of whom must be goalkeepers.

== Match officials ==
The following referees and assistant referees were appointed for the tournament.

Referees

- Husain Al Showaikh (Bahrain)
- Ahmed Kadhim Gatea (Iraq)
- Ahmad Yaqoub Ibrahim (Jordan)
- Ali Al Ashkar (Lebanon)
- Yahya Al Balushi (Oman)
- Baraa Aisha (Palestine)
- Faisal Al-Blwi (Saudi Arabia)
- Feras Taweel (Syria)
- Sultan Al Hammadi (United Arab Emirates)
- Feras Yousef (Yemen)

Assistant Referees

- Sayed Jalal Mahfoodh (Bahrain)
- Karrar Al Uaibi (Iraq)
- Qais Khamees (Jordan)
- Bilal Orfi (Lebanon)
- Mohammed Al Ghazali (Oman)
- Rafat Roma (Palestine)
- Saad Al-Subaie (Saudi Arabia)
- Mohamed Al Sayed Ali (Syria)
- Yasser Al Murshidi (United Arab Emirates)
- Ahmed Mushwer (Yemen)

== Venues ==
(Iraq) Baghdad	(Iraq) Karbala
Al-Madina Stadium	Karbala Stadium
Capacity: 30,000	Capacity: 30,000
2023 WAFF U-23 Championship is located in Iraq

== Group stage ==
=== Group A ===
Pos	Team	Pld	W	D	L	GF	GA	GD	Pts	Qualification
1	Iraq (H)	2	1	1	0	5	2	+3	4	Knockout stage
2	Jordan	2	1	1	0	4	3	+1	4	Knockout stage
3	United Arab Emirates	2	0	0	2	1	5	−4	0	

Source: GSA
Rules for classification: Qualification tiebreakers
(H) Hosts
12 June 2023
21:45 UTC+3

Jordan	2–2	Iraq
Abualnadi 22' (pen.) 50'	Report	Hassan 19'; Abdullah 29'

Al-Madina Stadium, Baghdad
Attendance: 7,000
Referee: Faisal Al-Blwi (Saudi Arabia)

14 June 2023
17:45 UTC+3

United Arab Emirates	1–2	Jordan
Abualnadi 45' (o.g.)	Report	Abu Shanab 82'; Dhawi 90+1' (o.g.)

Al-Madina Stadium, Baghdad
Attendance: 500
Referee: Ali Al Ashkar (Lebanon)

16 June 2023
21:45 UTC+3

Iraq	3–0	United Arab Emirates
Hassan 26'; Abdullah 73'; Al-Mosawe 87'	Report

Al-Madina Stadium, Baghdad
Attendance: 25,931
Referee: Yahya Al Balushi (Oman)

=== Group B ===
Pos	Team	Pld	W	D	L	GF	GA	GD	Pts	Qualification
1	Iran	2	1	1	0	4	2	+2	4	Knockout stage
2	Palestine	2	1	1	0	2	1	+1	4	
3	Syria	2	0	0	2	1	4	−3	0	

Updated to match(es) played on 14 June 2023. Source: GSA
Rules for classification: Qualification tiebreakers
12 June 2023
19:45 UTC+3

Syria	0–1	Palestine
	Report	Haj Yousef 37'

Karbala Stadium, Karbala
Referee: Ahmad Yacoub Ibrahim (Jordan)

14 June 2023
19:45 UTC+3

Iran	3–1	Syria
Y.Salmani 9', 45+4'; Shariatzadeh 15'	Report	M.Al Aswad 45'

Karbala Stadium, Karbala
Referee: Ahmed Kadhim Gatea (Iraq)

16 June 2023
19:45 UTC+3

Palestine	1–1	Iran
Qunbar 62'	Report	A.Barzegar 90+7'

Karbala Stadium, Karbala
Attendance: 1,000
Referee: Feras Yousef (Yemen)

=== Group C ===
Pos	Team	Pld	W	D	L	GF	GA	GD	Pts	Qualification
1	Oman	2	2	0	0	4	0	+4	6	Knockout stage
2	Yemen	2	1	0	1	2	4	−2	3	
3	Lebanon	2	0	0	2	1	3	−2	0	

Source: GSA
Rules for classification: Qualification tiebreakers
12 June 2023
17:45 UTC+3

Oman	1–0	Lebanon
Al-Abdulsalam 42' (pen.)	Report

Al-Madina Stadium, Baghdad
Attendance: 1,500
Referee: Sultan Al Hammadi (United Arab Emirates)

14 June 2023
21:45 UTC+3

Yemen	0–3	Oman
	Report	Al-Gaithiri 8'; Al-Rawahi 54' (pen.); Al-Hadabi 90+2'

Al-Madina Stadium, Baghdad
Attendance: 500
Referee: Feras Taweel (Syria)

16 June 2023
17:45 UTC+3

Lebanon	1–2	Yemen
Sadek 53'	Report	Al-Sharif 55'; Mahrous 65'

Al-Madina Stadium, Baghdad
Attendance: 2,000
Referee: Baraa Aisha (Palestine)

=== Ranking of Runners-ups ===
The best-placed runner-up will qualify for the knockout stage.

Pos	Team	Pld	W	D	L	GF	GA	GD	Pts	Qualification
1	Jordan	2	1	1	0	4	3	+1	4	Knockout stage
2	Palestine	2	1	1	0	2	1	+1	4	
3	Yemen	2	1	0	1	2	4	−2	3	

First match(es) will be played: 12 June 2023. Source:
Rules for classification: Qualification tiebreakers

== Knockout stage ==
Semi-finals
18 June – Baghdad
Iran	0 (4)
Jordan	0 (3)
18 June – Baghdad
Iraq	1
Oman	0

Final
20 June – Baghdad
Iran	1 (4)
Iraq	1 (5)

=== Semi-finals ===
18 June 2023
18:00 UTC+3

Iran	0–0	Jordan
	Report
Penalties
Y. Salmani (penalty scored); Hazbavi (penalty missed); A. Bavieh (penalty scored); M. Ghorbani (penalty scored); Hashemnejad (penalty scored)	4–3	(penalty scored) Al-Thiabat; (penalty missed) Abualnadi; (penalty missed) Jamous; (penalty scored) Al-Shanaineh; (penalty scored) Abu Taha

Al-Madina Stadium, Baghdad
Attendance: 8,000
Referee: Husain Al Showaikh (Bahrain)

18 June 2023
21:00 UTC+3

Iraq	1–0	Oman
Al-Rawahi 52' (o.g.)	Report

Al-Madina Stadium, Baghdad
Attendance: 29,566
Referee: Faisal Al-Blwi (Saudi Arabia)

=== Final ===
20 June 2023
20:00 UTC+3

Iran	1–1	Iraq
Goudarzi 31'	Report	Abdullah 45+3'
Penalties
Y. Salmani (penalty scored); Fallah (penalty missed); Irankhah (penalty scored); M. Ghorbani (penalty scored); Hashemnejad (penalty scored)	4–5	(penalty scored) K. Mohammed; (penalty scored) Tahseen; (penalty scored) Abdullah; (penalty scored) M. Mohammed; (penalty scored) Maknzi

Al-Madina Stadium, Baghdad
Attendance: 32,000
Referee: Sultan Al Hammadi (United Arab Emirates)

==== Winners ====
2023 WAFF U-23 Championship champion

Iraq
First title

== Awards ==
The following awards were given at the conclusion of the tournament:

=== Awards ===
Player of the Tournament

(Iraq) Muntadher Mohammed

Golden Boot

(Iraq) Hussein Abdullah (3 goals)

Golden Glove

(Iraq) Kumel Al-Rekabe

== Final standing ==
Rank	Team
1st place, gold medalist(s)	Iraq
2nd place, silver medalist(s)	Iran
3rd place, bronze medalist(s)	Oman
4	Jordan
5	Palestine
6	Yemen
7	Lebanon
8	Syria
9	United Arab Emirates

== Goalscorers ==
There have been 27 goals scored in 12 matches, for an average of 2.25 goals per match.

3 goals

- (Iraq) Hussein Abdullah

2 goals

- (Iran) Yasin Salmani
- (Iraq) Blnd Hassan
- (Jordan) Mohammad Abualnadi

1 goal

- (Iran) Aria Barzegar
- (Iran) Hossein Goudarzi
- (Iran) Ahmad Shariatzadeh
- (Iraq) Ali Al-Mosawe
- (Jordan) Faisal Abu Shanab
- (Lebanon) Mohamad Omar Sadek
- (Oman) Salem Al-Abdulsalam
- (Oman) Khalid Al-Gaithiri
- (Oman) Osama Al-Hadabi
- (Oman) Nasser Al-Rawahi
- (Palestine) Gibrán Haj Yousef
- (Palestine) Zaid Qunbar
- (Syria) Mahmoud Al Aswad
- (Yemen) Gassem Al-Sharafi
- (Yemen) Hamza Mahrous

1 own goal

- (Jordan) Mohammad Abualnadi (against United Arab Emirates)
- (Oman) Nasser Al-Rawahi (against Iraq)
- (United Arab Emirates) Nawaf Dhawi (against Jordan)

== Broadcasting rights ==
The following channels have been given broadcasting rights to broadcast the tournament.

Territory	Rights holder(s)
Iraq	Al Iraqiya Alrabiaa Network Television
United Arab Emirates	AD Sports Dubai Sports
Jordan	Jordan Sports TV
Yemen	Al-Saeeda
