= Blnd Hassan =

Iraqi footballer (born 2003)

Personal information
- Full name: Blnd Azad Klouri Hassan
- Date of birth: 12 August 2003 (age 23)
- Place of birth: Arnhem, Netherlands
- Height: 1.83 m (6 ft 0 in)
- Position: Winger

Team information
- Current team: Duhok
- Number: 9

Youth career
- –2015: ESA Rijkerswoerd
- 2015–2023: De Graafschap

Senior career*
| Years | Team | Apps | (Gls) |
| 2023–2025 | De Graafschap | 15 | (1) |
| 2025– | Duhok | 5 | (0) |
| 2026 | → Al-Gharraf (loan) | 16 | (1) |

International career
| 2021–2022 | Iraq U20 | 4 | (2) |
| 2023–2024 | Iraq U23 | 12 | (5) |
Medal record
Men's football
Representing Iraq
AFC U-23 Asian Cup
| Bronze medal – third place | 2024 Qatar | Team |
- * Club domestic league appearances and goals as of 11:06, 9 October 2026 (UTC)

Blnd Azad Klouri Hassan (Arabic: بلند آزاد كلوري حسن; born 12 August 2003) is a professional footballer who plays as a winger for Iraq Stars League club Duhok. Born in the Netherlands, he represents Iraq at youth level.

== Club career ==
Born in Arnhem, Netherlands to Kurdish parents from Iraq who came to the Netherlands as refugees in the 1990s during the Gulf War, Hassan started playing football for local amateur club ESA Rijkerswoerd. In 2015, he joined the youth academy of De Graafschap.

On 12 July 2023, Hassan signed his first senior contract with De Graafschap, securing a two-year deal. This came shortly after he scored his first goal for the club in a pre-season friendly against DZC '68 three days earlier. Under the guidance of head coach Jan Vreman, he earned a permanent spot in the first team ahead of the 2023–24 season. Competing for a starting position as the team's winger, he faced competition from other academy graduates. Hassan made his professional debut for the club on 11 August, the opening matchday of the season, starting and playing 66 minutes of a 0–0 Eerste Divisie draw against ADO Den Haag. In the subsequent game, he remained on the substitutes' bench as the team's new signing, Mimoun Mahi, was chosen as the left winger.

=== Duhok ===
In August 2025, Hassan joined Iraq Stars League club Duhok.

== International career ==
Hassan has represented Iraq at the youth international level, playing for both the under-20 and under-23 national teams. With the under-23 team, he was part of the squad that won the 2023 WAFF U-23 Championship, defeating arch rivals Iran in the final.

== Career statistics ==
As of match played 13 September 2026

Appearances and goals by club, season and competition
| Club | Season | League | | | National cup | | Other | | Total | |
| Club | Season | Division | Apps | Goals | Apps | Goals | Apps | Goals | Apps | Goals |
|---|---|---|---|---|---|---|---|---|---|---|
| De Graafschap | 2023–24 | Eerste Divisie | 11 | 0 | 2 | 0 | 0 | 0 | 13 | 0 |
| De Graafschap | 2024–25 | Eerste Divisie | 4 | 1 | 2 | 1 | 0 | 0 | 6 | 2 |
| De Graafschap | Total | | 15 | 1 | 4 | 1 | 0 | 0 | 19 | 2 |
| Duhok | 2025–26 | Iraq Stars League | 3 | 0 | 0 | 0 | — | | 3 | 0 |
| Duhok | 2026–27 | Iraq Stars League | 2 | 0 | 0 | 0 | — | | 2 | 0 |
| Duhok | Total | | 5 | 0 | 0 | 0 | — | | 5 | 0 |
| Al-Gharraf (loan) | 2025–26 | Iraq Stars League | 16 | 1 | — | | — | | 16 | 1 |
| Career total | | | 31 | 2 | 4 | 1 | 0 | 0 | 35 | 3 |

== Honours ==
Iraq U23

- WAFF U-23 Championship: 2023
