= Muntadher Mohammed =

Iraqi footballer (born 2001)

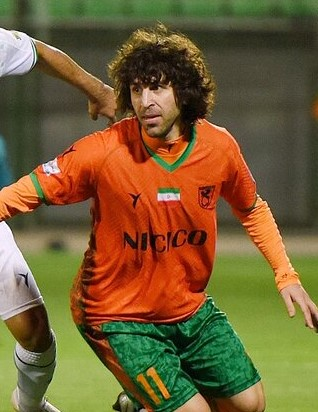

Personal information
- Full name: Muntadher Mohammed Jebur Naslookhi
- Date of birth: 13 July 2005 (age 21)
- Place of birth: Iraq
- Height: 1.67 m (5 ft 6 in)
- Position: Midfielder

Senior career*
Years	Team	Apps	(Gls)
2017–2018	Al-Kahrabaa		
2018–2019	Al-Karkh		
2019–2022	Al-Zawraa		
2022	Al-Quwa Al-Jawiya		
2022–2023	Al-Taawon		
2023	Al-Naft		
2023–2024	‌‌‌‌‌‌‌‌‌‌‌‌Esteghlal	0	(0)
2023–2024	→ Mes Rafsanjan (loan)	24	(3)
2024–2025	‌‌‌‌‌‌‌‌‌‌‌‌Nassaji	17	(0)

International career^{‡}
2014	Iraq U-14	4	(0)
2015–2017	Iraq U-17	14	(2)
2017–2020	Iraq U-20	15	(1)
2021–	Iraq U-23	32	(4)
2021–	Iraq	2	(0)
Medal record
Men's football
Representing Iraq
AFC U-23 Asian Cup
Bronze medal – third place	2024 Qatar	Team
- * Club domestic league appearances and goals as of 17 April 2025 ‡ National team caps and goals as of 2 May 2024

Muntadher Mohammed (Arabic: منتظر محمد; born 13 July 2005) is an Iraqi professional footballer who plays as a midfielder for club Duhok SC and the Iraq national team.

== Club career ==
Mohammed was on the bench for Al-Zawraa's AFC Champions League match on 7 April 2021, against Al-Wahda in Abu Dhabi. On 19 July 2021, Muntadher started the Iraq FA Cup final in the Iraqi Classico against rivals Al-Quwa Al-Jawiya, playing the full ninety as his side lost on penalties. Two months later, he came on as Al-Zawraa beat Al-Jawiya to take the 2021 Iraqi Super Cup, his first title at club and senior level.

Muntadher Mohammad joined the Esteghlal team on 3 August 2023 with a two-year contract.

== International career ==
Mohammed has represented Iraq at every single age category, winning three titles and captaining his country from U-18 onwards, and has competed at the AFC Asian Championship and FIFA World Cup at youth level.

=== Iraq U-14 ===
Muntadher received his first international call-up in 2014, when he travelled to Iran with Iraq's U-14s and won the AFC U-14 Championship, topping their group ahead of South Korea and beating North Korea in the final.

=== Iraq U-17 ===
In 2015, Mohammed was invited to join Iraq's U-16s in their qualifiers for the 2016 AFC U-16 Championship. He helped Iraq win their group and qualify for the final tournament, where he was called up. He helped Iraq win the tournament, scoring twice and qualifying for the 2017 FIFA U-17 World Cup.

In October 2017, Muntadher was called up to the Iraq U-17 squad for the 2017 FIFA U-17 World Cup. He played in all four of Iraq's matches as they made it to the Round of 16.

=== Iraq U-20 ===
In August 2019, Muntadher captained his country for the first time, leading Iraq's U-18s to the 2019 WAFF U-18 Championship title, his third international trophy.

In November 2017, Mohammed was called up to the Iraq U-19 squad for the 2018 AFC U-19 Championship qualifiers, where Iraq finished second in their group and qualified.

In the following qualifiers, he captained Iraq's U-19s and scored in their final match as they won their group undefeated and qualified for the 2020 AFC U-19 Championship. In January 2021, after several delays, the AFC cancelled the tournament due to the COVID-19 pandemic.

In February 2020, Mohammed captained Iraq's U-20s in the U-20 Arab Cup as they made it to the quarter-finals.

=== Iraq U-23 ===
Muntadher was the captain of the Iraq U-23s that won their qualifying group and qualified to the 2022 AFC U-23 Asian Cup in October 2021. He scored in Iraq's final qualifier against Bahrain. In June 2023, Mohammed was called up to the Iraq U-23s for the 2023 WAFF U-23 Championship, which they would win.

=== Iraq ===
Following his impressive stint captaining the U-23s, Muntadher received his first senior international call-up for Iraq's World Cup qualifiers against Syria and South Korea, remaining an unused sub in both matches.

He was then included in Iraq's 2021 FIFA Arab Cup squad, making his debut off the bench in their opening match against Oman.

== Personal life ==
Muntadher's older brother Mustafa Mohammed is also a footballer and was his teammate at Al-Zawraa between 2019 and 2021.

== Honours ==
Iraq U-14

- AFC U-14 Championship: 2014

Iraq U-16

- AFC U-16 Championship: 2016

Iraq U-18

- WAFF U-18 Championship: 2019

Iraq U–23

- WAFF U-23 Championship: 2023

Al-Zawraa

- Iraqi Super Cup: 2021

Individual

- Best Player Of 2023 WAFF U-23 Championship
