= Mo Abualnadi =

Jordanian footballer (born 2001)

Mohammad Abualnadi
Personal information
- Birth name: Mohammad Majed Abualnadi
- Date of birth: 8 February 2001 (age 25)
- Place of birth: Overland Park, Kansas, U.S.
- Height: 1.86 m (6 ft 1 in)
- Position: Centre-back

Team information
- Current team: Corvinul Hunedoara
- Number: 5

Youth career
- 2017–2019: Sporting Kansas City

College career
Years	Team	Apps	(Gls)
2019–2021	Notre Dame Fighting Irish	35	(1)
2021–2022	Pittsburgh Panthers	24	(1)

Senior career*
Years	Team	Apps	(Gls)
2019	Swope Park Rangers	4	(0)
2023	Sporting Kansas City II	6	(0)
2023	Sporting Kansas City	0	(0)
2023–2024	Al-Hussein		
2024	Al-Qasim		
2024–2026	Selangor	24	(0)
2026–	Corvinul Hunedoara	6	(0)

International career^{‡}
2019	Jordan U19	2	(0)
2022	Palestine U23	2	(0)
2023–2024	Jordan U23	13	(3)
2024–	Jordan	21	(0)
- * Club domestic league appearances and goals as of 23 October 2026 ‡ National team caps and goals as of 17 November 2026

Mohammad "Mo" Majed Abualnadi (Arabic: محمد ابو النادي; born February 8, 2001) is a professional soccer player who plays as a center back for Liga I club Corvinul Hunedoara. Born in the United States, he plays for the Jordan national team.

== Early life ==
Abu Al-Nadi was born in Overland Park, Kansas, United States, where he attended Blue Valley High School. He played futsal in his youth. He played for a year-round club, European Soccer Institute (ESI), for two years before joining Sporting Kansas City's academy for two years while in high school. He helped lead Sporting KC's U19 squad to the fourth seed in the playoffs and made the quarterfinals of the USSDA tournament.

== College career ==
Abu Al-Nadi played two years of college soccer for the Notre Dame Fighting Irish, as well as one year at Pittsburgh Panthers.

During his freshman year in 2019, Abu Al-Nadi played in all 19 matches, earning 15 starts as a defender during his rookie season. He earned his first start in his Notre Dame debut in the season-opening win at Saint Louis. He finished the season with a goal and an assist. He scored the first goal of his career at the 1:12 mark of the season opener, which was tied for the second fastest goal to open a match since the 1995 season. He provided an assist for the game-winning goal in the 1–0 victory over Duke.

As a sophomore in 2020, he played in 16 matches, earning 15 starts as a defender during his sophomore campaign. He also earned starts in five of Notre Dame's clean sheet wins.

On August 9, 2021, Abu Al-Nadi transferred to the Pittsburgh Panthers as a junior. He appeared in 15 games, starting in 14 of them. He was also named to the All-ACC Academic Team for the first time in his career, posting a 3.48 fall GPA.

The following year, Abu Al-Nadi registered a goal and an assist in a draw against Akron. He started in seven of nine games that year.

== Club career ==
=== Swope Park Rangers/Sporting Kansas City II ===
On March 8, 2019, Abu Al-Nadi signed with Swope Park Rangers as an amateur player. He made his club debut against Pittsburgh Riverhounds in a 2–2 draw.

On January 30, 2023, Abu Al-Nadi signed an MLS Next Pro professional contract with Sporting Kansas City II. On July 13, 2023, Sporting Kansas City II mutually agreed to part ways with Abu Al-Nadi.

=== Sporting Kansas City ===
On April 26, 2023, Abu Al-Nadi made his first-team debut for Sporting Kansas City, appearing in a Lamar Hunt U.S. Open Cup matchup against Tulsa Athletic, resulting in a 3–0 victory. Abu Al-Nadi's first-team debut began in the 81st minute when he came on for Robert Voloder at left back. The defender won two of three duels and made two tackles in just under 10 minutes of play.

=== Al-Hussein (Irbid) ===
On July 13, 2023, Abu Al-Nadi signed a two-year contract with Jordanian Pro League club Al-Hussein.

=== Al-Qasim ===
On August 22, 2024, Abu Al-Nadi signed a contract with Iraq Stars League club Al-Qasim.

A month after his move, Abu Al-Nadi had already expressed his desire to terminate his contract with the club through a contractual clause, after Malaysian side Selangor offered him a deal to join their club.

=== Selangor ===
On September 24, 2024, Abu Al-Nadi joined Malaysia Super League side Selangor, just before the transfer deadline.

=== Corvinul Hunedoara ===
On June 10, 2026, Abu Al-Nadi joined Liga I side Corvinul Hunedoara, just before the start of the 2026 FIFA World Cup.

== International career ==
Abu Al-Nadi began his international career in 2019 by appearing for the Jordan national under-19 football team in a set of friendlies against Qatar's Aspire Academy.

On March 17, 2023, Abu Al-Nadi was called in for a Jordan Olympic national team training camp in Lebanon from March 19–29. On June 8, 2023, Abu Al-Nadi was called up to the Jordan U-23 squad for the 2023 WAFF U-23 Championship. On August 26, 2023, Abu Al-Nadi was called up once again to take part in the 2024 AFC U-23 Asian Cup qualification process. He went on to appear for Jordan at the 2024 AFC U-23 Asian Cup.

On July 7, 2024, Abu Al-Nadi received a call-up to the Jordan national football team, participating in a training camp consisting of local players on July 17. On August 23, 2024, Abu Al-Nadi received another international call-up to the senior team, as part of preparations for a World Cup qualification friendly against North Korea. He made his debut for the national team on August 27, 2024, against North Korea.

On August 30, 2024, Abu Al-Nadi received his first proper senior international call-up, to take part in the 2026 FIFA World Cup qualification process.

== Career statistics ==
=== International ===
As of match played 17 November 2026

Appearances and goals by national team and year
National team	Year	Apps	Goals
Jordan	2024	6	0
Jordan	2025	9	0
Jordan	2026	6	0
Total		21	0

== Honours ==
Al-Hussein

- Jordanian Pro League: 2023–24
- Jordan FA Cup runner-up: 2023–24

Selangor

- MFL Challenge Cup: 2024–25
- ASEAN Club Championship: 2025–26
