= Gibrán Haj Yousef =

Palestinian footballer

Gibran Haj Yousef
Personal information
- Full name: Gibran Haj Yousef Cordero
- Date of birth: 27 January 2001 (age 25)
- Place of birth: Ciudad Bolívar, Venezuela
- Height: 1.88 m (6 ft 2 in)
- Position: Centre forward

Youth career
- –2017: Mineros de Guayana

Senior career*
Years	Team	Apps	(Gls)
2019–2020	Mineros de Guayana	4	(1)
2020–2021	Deportivo Táchira	1	(0)
2021–2022	→ LALA (loan)	17	(0)
2022	Mineros de Guayana	3	(0)

International career^{‡}
2022–2023	Palestine U23	9	(1)
- * Club domestic league appearances and goals as of 18 August 2022 ‡ National team caps and goals as of 9 December 2023

Gibran Haj Yousef Cordero (Arabic: جبران حاج يوسف; born 27 January 2001) is a professional footballer who plays as a centre forward. Born in Venezuela, he most recently represented Palestine at youth level.

== Club career ==
Gibran began his professional career with Mineros de Guayana after graduating from their youth team.

On 20 January 2020 he signed a contract with Deportivo Táchira. On 21 February 2020, he made his professional debut for Deportivo Táchira in the Liga Futve, coming on as a substitute in a 2–0 defeat to Zamora.

At the start of the 2021 league season, it was decided that Gibran would be loaned to LALA FC, a club newly promoted to the first division.

== International career ==
Gibran made his debut for the Palestine u23 national team on 22 May 2022 against Algeria in a match that ended in a 3–1 defeat.

Gibran scored the goal that sealed the 1–0 win over Syria on 12 June 2023.

== See also ==
- List of Palestine international footballers born outside Palestine

== Career statistics ==
=== Club ===
As of match played 18 August 2022

Appearances and goals by club, season and competition
Club	Season	League			National cup (Note: Includes Copa Venezuela and DFB Pokal matches)		Continental		Other		Total	
Club	Season	League	Apps	Goals	Apps	Goals	Apps	Goals	Apps	Goals	Apps	Goals
Mineros de Guayana	2017	Primera División	2	1	–		–		–		2	1
Mineros de Guayana	2018	Primera División	2	0	–		–		–		2	0
Deportivo Táchira	2021	Primera División	1	0	–		–		–		1	0
LALA (loan)	2021	Primera División	17	0	–		–		–		17	0
Mineros de Guayana	2022	Primera División	3	0	–		–		–		3	0
Mineros de Guayana	Total		25	1	–		–		—		25	1
Career total			25	1	–		–		—		25	1
