= Ahmed Maknzi =

Iraqi football player

Personal information
- Full name: Ahmed Hassan Maknzi Salman Al-Lami Al-Reeshawee
- Date of birth: 24 September 2001 (age 25)
- Place of birth: Baghdad, Iraq
- Height: 1.82 m (6 ft 0 in)
- Position: Left-back

Team information
- Current team: Al-Karma
- Number: 3

Youth career
- –2019: Al-Zawraa

Senior career*
Years	Team	Apps	(Gls)
2019–2023	Al-Zawraa		
2023–2024	Erbil	28	(1)
2024–2025	Al-Najaf	35	(3)
2025–	Al-Karma	27	(5)

International career^{‡}
2019	Iraq U-18	7	(0)
2021–2024	Iraq U23	24	(0)
2024–	Iraq	6	(0)
Medal record
Men's football
Representing Iraq
AFC U-23 Asian Cup
Bronze medal – third place	2024 Qatar	Team
- * Club domestic league appearances and goals as of 16 September 2026 ‡ National team caps and goals as of 27 July 2026

Ahmed Hassan Maknzi (Arabic: أحمد حسن مكنزي; born 24 September 2001) is an Iraqi professional football player who plays as a left-back for Iraq Stars League club Al-Karma and the Iraq national team.

== International career ==
In June 2023, Maknzi was called up to the Iraq U-23 national team for the 2023 WAFF U-23 Championship, which was being hosted in Iraq and which Iraq would win.

On 19 May 2026, Maknzi was named in Iraq's 34-man preliminary squad for the 2026 FIFA World Cup. He was subsequently included in the final 26-man squad on 6 June, replacing the injured Ahmed Yahya.

== Honours ==
Al-Zawraa

- Iraqi Super Cup: 2021

Iraq U-23

- WAFF U-23 Championship: 2023
