= Zaid Tahseen =

Iraqi footballer

Personal information
- Full name: Zaid Tahseen Abd Zaid Hantoosh
- Date of birth: 29 January 2001 (age 25)
- Place of birth: Najaf, Iraq
- Height: 1.93 m (6 ft 4 in)
- Position: Centre-back

Team information
- Current team: Pakhtakor
- Number: 4

Senior career*
Years	Team	Apps	(Gls)
2019–2020	Al-Najaf		
2020–2021	Naft Al-Wasat	31	(1)
2021–2024	Al-Talaba	92	(13)
2024–2025	Al-Quwa Al-Jawiya	30	(2)
2025–	Pakhtakor	25	(2)

International career^{‡}
2021–2024	Iraq Olympic	26	(3)
2022–	Iraq	30	(1)
Medal record
Men's football
Representing Iraq
AFC U-23 Asian Cup
Bronze medal – third place	2024 Qatar	Team
- * Club domestic league appearances and goals as of 16 September 2026 ‡ National team caps and goals as of 22 June 2026

Zaid Tahseen Abd Zaid Hantoosh (Arabic: زَيْد تَحْسِيْن عَبد زيد حنتوش; born 29 January 2001) is an Iraqi footballer who plays as a centre-back for Pakhtakor in the Uzbekistan Super League and the Iraq national team.

== Club career ==
=== Al Najaf ===
Tahseen started his career with his local side Al-Najaf. He signed for Amanat Baghdad ahead of the 2020-21 season, but Al Najaf disputed the legality of the transfer, which was then canceled and the player returned to Al Najaf.

=== Naft Al Wasat ===
Following his failed transfer to Amanat Baghdad, Tahseen returned to Al-Najaf, before agreeing to Join Naft Al Wasat. He scored his first goal for the club against Al-Hudood SC, a 94th minute goal to win the match 2-1. Tahseen was squad regular in the team as his side finished fifth in the league.

=== Al Talaba ===
Tahseen joined Bagdad side Al-Talaba ahead of the 2021-2022 season. He quickly impressed with his defensive prowess and goalscoring abilities, which earned him a call up to the national team. Tahseen scored his first goal against Al-Kahrabaa SC in a 2-2 draw. He would score two more league goals that season, as Al-Talaba finished in 3rd place. The following season, Tahseen scored 4 league goals as Al-Talaba slipped to 4th place in the league. Tahseen was awarded the player of the month award in April. He was voted to the team of the season by Arab football site Kooora

Tahseen renewed his contract with Al-Talaba ahead of the 2023-24 season. Tahseen was a permeant fixture in the side, being named the captain, but received criticism for some of his performances. His former manager Hassan Ahmed described him as being "complacent and egotistical" following a 4-0 loss against Naft Maysan. Tahseen became one of the team's penalty kick takers, where he scored 4 penalties from a total of 6 goals during the season, however Al-Talaba slipped further that season, finishing in 8th place.

=== Al Quwa Al Jawiya ===
On August 20, 2024, Tahseen joined Iraqi side Al Quwa Al Jawiya on a free transfer

=== Pakhtakor ===
On 22 July 2025, Uzbekistan Super League club Pakhtakor announced the signing of Tahseen from Al-Quwa Al-Jawiya, on a contract until the end of the 2026 season.

== International career ==
=== Iraq U-23 ===
In June 2023, Zaid was called up to the Iraq U-23 national team for the 2023 WAFF U-23 Championship, which was being hosted in Iraq and which Iraq would win.

Tahseen was called up to the Asian Cup U23 Qualifiers, held in Kuwait, in which Iraq topped the group and qualified, with Tahseen scoring against Buhtan He was also called up to the tournament proper. Tahseen captained the side to winning the bronze medal and qualifying to the 2024 Summer Olympic Games football Tournament. Tahseen was called up to the Olympic games and played in all three matches as Iraq crashed out of the group stages.

=== Iraq ===
On 26 September 2022, Tahseen made his first international cap with Iraq against Syria in the 2022 Jordan International Tournament.

Tahseen was part of the Iraq squad in the 25th Arabian Gulf Cup, which Iraq won on home soil.

In January 2024, he was selected in Iraq's 26-men squad for the 2023 AFC Asian Cup.

== Career statistics ==
=== International ===
As of match played 22 June 2026

Appearances and goals by national team and year
National team	Year	Apps	Goals
Iraq	2022	3	0
Iraq	2023	1	0
Iraq	2024	13	1
Iraq	2025	7	0
Iraq	2026	6	0
Total		30	1

International goals by date, venue, cap, opponent, score, result and competition
No.	Date	Venue	Opponent	Score	Result	Competition
1	26 March 2024	Rizal Memorial Stadium, Manila, Philippines	Philippines	5–0	5–0	2026 FIFA World Cup qualification

== Honours ==
Pakhtakor

- Uzbekistan Cup: 2025

Iraq U-23

- WAFF U-23 Championship: 2023

Iraq

- Arabian Gulf Cup: 2023

Individual

- Iraq Stars League Player of the Month: April 2023
