= Ahmad Shariatzadeh =

Iranian association football player

Personal information
- Full name: Ahmad Shariatzadeh
- Date of birth: 1 July 2002 (age 24)
- Place of birth: Abadan, Iran
- Height: 1.77 m (5 ft 10 in)
- Position: Winger

Team information
- Current team: Zob Ahan
- Number: 17

Youth career
- Sanat Naft Abadan

Senior career*
Years	Team	Apps	(Gls)
2019–2024	Sanat Naft Abadan	71	(4)
2024–	Zob Ahan	14	(0)

International career^{‡}
2018	Iran U16	4	(3)
2019	Iran U19	5	(0)
2022–2023	Iran U23	8	(2)
- * Club domestic league appearances and goals as of 16 March 2025 ‡ National team caps and goals as of 20 June 2023

Ahmad Shariatzadeh (Persian: احمد شریعت‌زاده; born 1 July 2002) is an Iranian footballer who plays as a winger for Iranian club Zob Ahan in the Persian Gulf Pro League.

== Career statistics ==
=== Club ===
Club	Season	League			Cup		Continental		Total	
Club	Season	League	Apps	Goals	Apps	Goals	Apps	Goals	Apps	Goals
Sanat	2018-19	Persian Gulf Pro League	1	0	0	0	0	0	1	0
Sanat	2019-20	Persian Gulf Pro League	2	0	0	0	0	0	2	0
Sanat	2020-21	Persian Gulf Pro League	22	1	1	0	0	0	23	1
Sanat	2021-22	Persian Gulf Pro League	16	0	0	0	0	0	16	0
Sanat	2022-23	Persian Gulf Pro League	18	2	0	0	0	0	18	2
Sanat	2023-24	Persian Gulf Pro League	12	1	0	0	0	0	12	1
Sanat	Total		71	4	1	0	0	0	72	4
Zob Ahan	2023-24	Persian Gulf Pro League	3	0	1	1	0	0	4	1
Career Total			74	4	2	1	0	0	76	5

== Club career ==
=== Sanat Naft ===
He made his debut for Sanat Naft Abadan in last fixtures of 2018–19 Iran Pro League against Saipa while he substituted in for Taleb Reykani.

== Honours ==
=== International ===
Iran U19

- CAFA Junior Championship 2019
