= Josef Al-Imam =

Iraqi footballer (born 2004)

Personal information
- Date of birth: 27 July 2004 (age 22)
- Place of birth: Malmö, Sweden
- Height: 1.87 m (6 ft 2 in)
- Position: Centre-back

Team information
- Current team: Duhok
- Number: 3

Youth career
- –2022: Malmö FF

Senior career*
Years	Team	Apps	(Gls)
2023	Malmö FF	0	(0)
2023	→ BK Olympic (loan)	11	(2)
2024–2025	BK Olympic	7	(0)
2025–	Duhok	17	(1)

International career^{‡}
2021	Sweden U18	3	(0)
2022	Sweden U19	4	(0)
2023–2026	Iraq U23	23	(0)
2026–	Iraq	1	(0)
- * Club domestic league appearances and goals as of 3 April 2026 ‡ National team caps and goals as of 26 September 2026

Josef Al-Imam (Arabic: يوسف الامام; born 27 July 2004) is a professional footballer who plays as a centre-back for Iraq Stars League club Duhok. Born in Sweden, he represents the Iraq national team.

Al-Imam represented Iraq at the 2024 Olympics, making two appearances. In August 2025, Al-Imam moved to Iraq Stars League club Duhok.

== Career Statistics ==
=== Club ===
As of match played 3 April 2026

Appearances and goals by club, season and competition
Club	Season	League			National cup (Note: Includes Iraq FA Cup)		Continental		Total	
Club	Season	Division	Apps	Goals	Apps	Goals	Apps	Goals	Apps	Goals
BK Olympic	2023	Ettan	11	2	-	-	-	-	11	2
BK Olympic	2024	Ettan	7	0	-	-	-	-	7	0
Duhok	2025–26	Iraq Stars League	17	1	1	0	-	-	18	1
Career total			35	3	1	0	0	0	36	3

== Honours ==
Iraq U23

- AFC U-23 Asian Cup third place: 2024
