= Palestine national under-23 football team =

Palestine under-23
- Association: Palestinian Football Association
- Confederation: AFC (Asia)
- Sub-confederation: WAFF (West Asia)
- Head coach: Ibrahim Abu Madi
- Home stadium: Various
- FIFA code: PLE
First colours	Second colours

First international
- Iran 2–2 Palestine (Kuwait City, Kuwait; 4 April 2002)

Biggest win
- Palestine 9–0 Sri Lanka (Isa Town, Bahrain; 22 March 2019)

Biggest defeat
- Bahrain 5–0 Palestine (Beirut, Lebanon; 5 October 2002)

AFC U-23 Asian Cup
- Appearances: 1 (first in 2018)
- Best result: Quarter-finals (2018)

The Palestine national under-23 football team (Arabic: منتخب فلسطين تحت 23 سنة لكرة القدم), also known as the Palestine Olympic football team, represents Palestine in international football competitions in the Olympic Games, the Asian Games, and the AFC U-23 Asian Cup, as well as any other under-23 international football tournament. The team also serves as the national under-22 football team of Palestine.

The selection is limited to players under the age of 23, except for the Olympics which allows the men's team up to three overage players. The team is controlled by the Palestinian Football Association. The side has never qualified for the Olympic Games. They have participated five times in the Asian Games and once in the AFC U-23 Asian Cup.

== Competitive record ==
=== Summer Olympic Games ===
Summer Olympic Games record										Qualification record						
Host nation, city and year	Round	Pos	Pld	W	D	L	GF	GA	Squad	Outcome	Pld	W	D	L	GF	GA
1908–1988	See Palestine national team									See Palestine national team						
(Spain) Barcelona 1992	did not participate									did not participate						
(United States) Atlanta 1996	did not participate									did not participate						
(Australia) Sydney 2000	did not participate									did not participate						
(Greece) Athens 2004	did not qualify									First round win, Second round defeat	4	2	1	1	5	4
(China) Beijing 2008	did not qualify									First round defeat	2	0	1	1	2	3
(United Kingdom) London 2012	did not qualify									First round win, Second round defeat	4	3	0	1	6	2
(Brazil) Rio 2016	did not qualify									The 2016 AFC U-23 Championship served as the qualifying tournament						
(Japan) Tokyo 2020	did not qualify									The 2020 AFC U-23 Championship served as the qualifying tournament						
(France) Paris 2024	did not qualify									The 2024 AFC U-23 Asian Cup served as the qualifying tournament						
Total	–	0/9	–	–	–	–	–	–	–	Total	10	5	2	3	13	9

=== AFC U-23 Asian Cup ===
AFC U-23 Asian Cup record										Qualification record						
Host nation(s) and year	Round	Pos	Pld	W	D	L	GF	GA	Squad	Outcome	Pld	W	D	L	GF	GA
(Oman) 2013	did not qualify									4th of 6	5	1	2	2	3	7
(Qatar) 2016	did not qualify									3rd of 5	4	2	0	2	6	4
(China) 2018	Quarter-finals	7th of 16	4	1	1	2	8	6	Squad	1st of 4	3	2	1	0	8	4
(Thailand) 2020	did not qualify									2nd of 4	3	2	0	1	10	2
(Uzbekistan) 2022	did not qualify									3rd of 3	2	0	1	1	2	4
(Qatar) 2024	did not qualify									2nd of 4	3	2	0	1	3	2
(Saudi Arabia) 2026	did not qualify									3rd of 4	3	1	0	2	7	4
(Japan) 2028	To be determined															
Total	Best: Quarter-finals	1/8	4	1	1	2	8	6	–	Total	23	10	4	9	39	27

=== WAFF U-23 Championship ===
WAFF U-23 Championship record
Host nation(s) and year	Round	Pos	Pld	W	D	L	GF	GA	Squad
(Qatar) 2015	Group stage	7th of 10	3	1	0	2	2	6	Squad
(Saudi Arabia) 2021	Group stage	5th of 11	3	2	0	1	5	3	Squad
(Saudi Arabia) 2022	did not participate								
(Iraq) 2023	Group stage	5th of 8	2	1	1	0	2	1	Squad
Total	Best: group stage	3/4	8	4	1	3	9	10	–

=== Asian Games ===
Asian Games record
Host nation, city and year	Round	Pos	Pld	W	D	L	GF	GA	Squad
1951–1998	See Palestine national football team								
(South Korea) Busan 2002	Group stage	21st of 24	3	0	0	3	0	9	Squad
(Qatar) Doha 2006	Group stage	22nd of 28	3	0	0	3	0	6	Squad
(China) Guangzhou 2010	Group stage	20th of 24	3	0	1	2	0	6	Squad
(South Korea) Incheon 2014	Round of 16	14th of 29	4	2	0	2	5	7	Squad
Indonesia 2018	Round of 16	11th of 25	5	2	2	1	5	4	Squad
China 2022	Round of 16	15th of 21	3	0	1	2	0	2	Squad
Total	Best: round of 16	6/6	21	4	4	13	10	34	–

=== Arab Games ===
Arab Games record
Host nation, city and year	Round	Pos	Pld	W	D	L	GF	GA	Squad
1953–2011	See Palestine national football team								
Algeria 2023	Group stage		3	0	2	1	2	3	Squad
Total	Best: group stage		3	0	2	1	2	3	–

== Players ==
=== Current squad ===
The following players have been called up to participate in the 2026 AFC U-23 Asian Cup qualifiers against Kyrgyzstan, Sri Lanka, and Uzbekistan, scheduled to take place from 3 to 9 September 2025.

No.	Pos.	Player	Date of birth (age)	Club
	GK	Mahdi Assi	24 December 2004 (age 21)	(Palestinian Football Association)
	GK	Rami Jabareen	1 March 2005 (age 21)	(Israel Football Association) Maccabi Umm al-Fahm
	GK	Mohammed Abu Shaqra	25 March 2006 (age 20)	(Palestinian Football Association)
	DF	Moaz Nahnoosh	14 August 2004 (age 22)	(Palestinian Football Association)
	DF	Abdul Hamid Abu Qubaita	19 May 2004 (age 22)	(Palestinian Football Association)
	DF	Amr Rizq	23 April 2003 (age 23)	(Egyptian Football Association) Delphi
	DF	Khalid Abu El Haija	13 November 2005 (age 21)	(German Football Association) 1. FC Nürnberg II
	DF	Muayad Hasassnah	26 February 2004 (age 22)	(Palestinian Football Association)
	DF	Yazan Sharha	18 January 2003 (age 23)	(Palestinian Football Association)
	DF	Zacarías Abuhadba	20 July 2005 (age 21)	(Football Federation of Chile) Deportes Antofagasta
	MF	Ali Al-Taamra	1 November 2004 (age 22)	(Palestinian Football Association)
	MF	Mohammad Al-Batsh	29 July 2004 (age 22)	(Libyan Football Federation) Al-Qadisiyah
	MF	Qais Taha	23 July 2003 (age 23)	(Palestinian Football Association)
	MF	Mohammed Sandouqa	5 April 2003 (age 23)	(Jordan Football Association) Sama Al-Sarhan SC
	MF	Suhaib Elias Ali	12 December 2007 (age 18)	(German Football Association) 1.FC Union Berlin U19
	MF	Hadi Dakour	28 June 2004 (age 22)	(Lebanese Football Association) Shabab Al Sahel
	MF	Tariq Awawdeh	24 July 2006 (age 20)	(Jordan Football Association) Al-Faisaly U21
	MF	Abdulhadi Rashid	6 June 2005 (age 21)	(Lebanese Football Association) Al-Ansar FC U19
	MF	Jihad Abu Al-Ainain	10 August 2003 (age 23)	(Lebanese Football Association) Racing Beirut
	FW	Ibrahim Abu Allan	3 May 2004 (age 22)	(Palestinian Football Association)
	FW	Hassan Daoud	23 January 2004 (age 22)	(Palestinian Football Association)
	FW	Oday Hassoun	22 February 2004 (age 22)	(Syrian Football Association) Hutteen SC
	FW	Bassam Abdullah	10 March 2004 (age 22)	(Palestinian Football Association)

=== Previous squads ===
AFC U-23 Asian Cup

- 2018 AFC U-23 Asian Cup squad

Asian Games

- Asian Games 2002 squad
- Asian Games 2006 squad
- Asian Games 2010 squad
- Asian Games 2014 squad
- Asian Games 2018 squad

Arab Games

- Arab Games 2023 squad

== See also ==
- Palestine national football team
- Palestine national under-20 football team
- Palestine national under-17 football team
- Football in Palestine
