= Seif Darwish =

Jordanian footballer

Personal information
- Full name: Seif Al-Deen Mousa Darwish
- Date of birth: 5 May 2003 (age 23)
- Place of birth: Amman, Jordan
- Height: 1.68 m (5 ft 6 in)
- Position: Attacking midfielder

Team information
- Current team: Al-Hussein
- Number: 91

Youth career
- –2021: Al-Hussein

Senior career*
Years	Team	Apps	(Gls)
2021–2025	Al-Hussein		
2025	→ Al-Sareeh (loan)	7	(0)
2025–2026	Stal Mielec	0	(0)
2025–2026	→ Stal Rzeszów (loan)	20	(3)
2026–	Al-Hussein	0	(0)

International career^{‡}
2021	Jordan U18		
2022–2023	Jordan U20		
2023–	Jordan U23		
- * Club domestic league appearances and goals as of 20:42, 26 May 2026 (UTC) ‡ National team caps and goals as of 25 March 2025

Seif Al-Deen Mousa Darwish (Arabic: سيف الدين موسى درويش; born 5 May 2003) is a Jordanian professional footballer who plays for Al-Hussein SC (Irbid).

== Club career ==
=== Al-Hussein ===
Born in Amman, Darwish began his career at Al-Hussein SC (Irbid). In April 2023, Darwish signed a five-year contract extension with Al-Hussein SC (Irbid). On 18 March 2024, he was acknowledged as the player of the month while at Al-Hussein.

==== Al-Sareeh (loan) ====
On 1 February 2025, Al-Hussein sent Darwish to Al-Sareeh SC on a short loan, due to recent signings of Mohammad Abu Zrayq and Júlio Romeneli at his parent club.

=== Stal Mielec ===
On 9 September 2025, Darwish joined I liga club Stal Mielec on a one-year contract, with an option for an extension.

==== Stal Rzeszów (loan) ====
On the same day of signing with Stal Mielec, Darwish was sent on loan to I liga club Stal Rzeszów.

=== Return to Al-Hussein ===
At the end of July 2026, Darwish re-joined Al-Hussein on a two-year contract.

== International career ==
Darwish participated in the 2023 AFC U-20 Asian Cup, where he played three matches.
