= Qatar national under-23 football team =

Qatar Under-23
- Nickname: Al-Annabi (The Maroons)
- Association: Qatar Football Association
- Confederation: AFC (Asia)
- Sub-confederation: WAFF (West Asia)
- Head coach: Ilídio Vale
- Home stadium: Khalifa International Stadium; Jassim bin Hamad Stadium
- FIFA code: QAT
| First colours | Second colours |

Biggest win
- Qatar 13–0 Brunei (Doha, Qatar; 3 September 2025)

Biggest defeat
- Qatar 0–6 Uzbekistan (Cibinong, Indonesia; 16 August 2018); Qatar 0–6 Uzbekistan (Tashkent, Uzbekistan; 4 June 2022)

Olympic Games
- Appearances: 1 (first in 1992)
- Best result: Quarter-finals (1992)

AFC U-23 Asian Cup
- Appearances: 6 (first in 2016)
- Best result: Bronze Medal (2018)

Asian Games
- Appearances: 6 (first in 2002)
- Best result: Gold Medal (2006)

The Qatar national under-23 football team (also known as Qatar Under-23 or Qatar Olympics Team) represents Qatar in international football competitions in GCC U-23 Championship and football at the Summer Olympics, as well as any other under-23 international football tournaments.

Qatar U-23 also currently competes in the Qatar Stars League 2, the second tier of the Qatar football league system.

== History ==
Compared to regional neighbours, Qatar has a decent record in Olympic football, with two prior Summer Olympics qualifications and a gold medal in the 2006 Asian Games.

In 1992, the Qatar U-23 squad dominated its Olympic qualifying campaign at the expense of Japan, China and Saudi Arabia. In the finals, the Qataris were given a tough draw next to host nation Spain, Colombia and Egypt. Qatar kicked off their matches at Barcelona with a crucial 1–0 win over fellow Arab nation Egypt, before registering a 1–1 draw with Colombia to secure a place in the knockout stage, turning the last group match against Spain into a formality.

A loss to Poland in the knockout stage fell a little bit short of rising expectations, but reaching it led to the country's best Olympic result.

When hosting the 2006 Asian Games, Qatar U-23 found itself with a double objective; to show that it was capable of hosting a major event of that caliber, and demonstrate that its football team was worthy of standing alongside Asia's elite. Tallying five wins throughout the tournament, Qatar's momentum escalated from one match to another, reaching its peak in the 2–0 final against Iraq.

For the 2026–27 season, the Qatar U-23 team entered the Qatar Stars League 2 in order to provide more game time for youth talents of the country.

== Tournament records ==
=== Summer Olympics ===
Since 1992, Football at the Summer Olympics has been an Under-23 tournament.

Olympics Record
| Year | Round | Position | GP | W | D | L | GS | GA |
|---|---|---|---|---|---|---|---|---|
| (Spain) 1992 | Quarter-finals | 8 | 4 | 1 | 1 | 2 | 2 | 5 |
| (United States) 1996 | did not qualify | | | | | | | |
| (Australia) 2000 | did not qualify | | | | | | | |
| (Greece) 2004 | did not qualify | | | | | | | |
| (China) 2008 | did not qualify | | | | | | | |
| (United Kingdom) 2012 | did not qualify | | | | | | | |
| (Brazil) 2016 | did not qualify | | | | | | | |
| (Japan) 2020 | did not qualify | | | | | | | |
| (France) 2024 | did not qualify | | | | | | | |
| (United States) 2028 | to be determined | | | | | | | |
| (Australia) 2032 | to be determined | | | | | | | |
| Total | 1/11 | Best: 8th | 4 | 1 | 1 | 2 | 2 | 5 |

=== U-23 Asian Cup ===
AFC U-23 Championship Record
| Year | Round | Position | GP | W | D | L | GS | GA |
|---|---|---|---|---|---|---|---|---|
| (Oman) 2013 | did not qualify | | | | | | | |
| (Qatar) 2016 | Semi-finals | 4th | 6 | 4 | 0 | 2 | 13 | 10 |
| (China) 2018 | Third place | 3rd | 6 | 5 | 1 | 0 | 10 | 5 |
| (Thailand) 2020 | Group stage | 11th | 3 | 0 | 3 | 0 | 3 | 3 |
| (Uzbekistan) 2022 | Group stage | 13th | 3 | 0 | 2 | 1 | 3 | 9 |
| (Qatar) 2024 | Quarter-finals | 6th | 4 | 2 | 1 | 1 | 6 | 5 |
| (Saudi Arabia) 2026 | Group stage | 16th | 3 | 0 | 0 | 3 | 0 | 5 |
| (Japan) 2028 | To be determined | | | | | | | |
| Total | 6/8 | 0 title(s) | 25 | 11 | 7 | 7 | 35 | 37 |

=== Asian Games ===
Since 2002, Football at the Asian Games has been an Under-23 tournament.

Asian Games Record
| Year | Round | Position | GP | W | D | L | GS | GA |
|---|---|---|---|---|---|---|---|---|
| (South Korea) 2002 | Group stage | 11th | 3 | 1 | 2 | 0 | 13 | 2 |
| (Qatar) 2006 | Final | Gold | 6 | 5 | 0 | 1 | 13 | 2 |
| (China) 2010 | Round of 16 | 9th | 4 | 2 | 1 | 1 | 4 | 2 |
| (South Korea) 2014 | Withdrew | | | | | | | |
| (Indonesia) 2018 | Group stage | 21st | 3 | 0 | 1 | 2 | 1 | 8 |
| (China) 2022 | Round of 16 | 16th | 2 | 0 | 1 | 2 | 1 | 3 |
| (Japan) 2026 | Group stage | 14th | 2 | 0 | 0 | 2 | 1 | 6 |
| Total | 6/7 | 1 title(s) | 20 | 8 | 5 | 8 | 33 | 23 |

=== GCC U-23 Championship ===
GCC U-23 Championship Record
| Year | Round | Position | GP | W | D | L | GS | GA |
|---|---|---|---|---|---|---|---|---|
| (Saudi Arabia) 2008 | Final group | 3rd | 4 | 1 | 2 | 1 | 8 | 5 |
| (Qatar) 2010 | Semi-finals | 4th | 4 | 0 | 2 | 2 | 2 | 6 |
| (Qatar) 2011 | Semi-finals | 4th | 4 | 1 | 0 | 3 | 3 | 9 |
| Total | 3/3 | Best: 3rd | 12 | 2 | 4 | 6 | 13 | 20 |

== Recent results and fixtures ==
Win Draw Lose

=== 2026 ===
| 7 January 2026 AFC U-23 Asian Cup GS | Qatar | 0–2 | United Arab Emirates | Jeddah, Saudi Arabia |
| 19:30 UTC+3 | | Report | Al-Memari 21'; Ndiaye 37' | Stadium: Prince Abdullah Al-Faisal Sports City Stadium; Attendance: 203; Referee: Alex King (Australia) |

| 10 January 2026 AFC U-23 Asian Cup GS | Syria | 1–0 | Qatar | Jeddah, Saudi Arabia |
| 19:30 UTC+3 | Al Aswad 85' (pen.) | Report | | Stadium: Prince Abdullah Al-Faisal Sports City Stadium; Attendance: 898; Referee: Faisal Al-Balawi (Saudi Arabia) |

| 13 January 2026 AFC U-23 Asian Cup GS | Japan | 2–0 | Qatar | Jeddah, Saudi Arabia |
| 19:30 UTC+3 | Furuya 30'; Satō 80' | Report | | Stadium: King Abdullah Sports City Hall Stadium; Attendance: 190; Referee: Choi Hyun-jai (South Korea) |

| 15 September 2026 Asian Games GS | Qatar | 1–4 | South Korea | Nagoya, Japan |
| 19:30 UTC+9 | Sherif 85' | Report | Eom Ji-sung 7', 20', 45+1'; Kim Myung-jun 66' | Stadium: Paloma Mizuho Rugby Stadium; Attendance: 1,633; Referee: Adam Kersey (Australia) |

| 18 September 2026 Asian Games GS | Saudi Arabia | 2–0 | Qatar | Nagoya |
| 19:30 UTC+9 | Barnawi 38'; Houssa 47' | Report | | Stadium: Paloma Mizuho Rugby Stadium; Attendance: 1,214; Referee: Sultan Al-Hammadi (United Arab Emirates) |

| 10 November 2026 Gia Lai U-23 VTV Cup | Singapore | 0–0 | Qatar | Gia Lai, Vietnam |
| 15:00 UTC+7 | | Report | | Stadium: Pleiku Stadium; Referee: Nguyễn Mạnh Hải (Vietnam) |

| 12 November Gia Lai U-23 VTV Cup | Thailand | 1–2 | Qatar | Gia Lai, Vietnam |
| 15:00 UTC+7 | Phongsakon 90+3' (pen.) | Report | Jarrar 8'; Saleh 18' | Stadium: Pleiku Stadium; Referee: Đỗ Khánh Nam (Vietnam) |

| 14 November 2026 Gia Lai U-23 VTV Cup | Vietnam | 1–1 | Qatar | Gia Lai, Vietnam |
| 19:00 UTC+7 | Nguyễn Minh Tâm 48' | Report | Faragalla 20' | Stadium: Pleiku Stadium; Attendance: 10,068; Referee: Razlan Joffri Ali (Malaysia) |

== Coaching staff ==
| Position | Name |
|---|---|
| Team manager | (Qatar) Mohammed Jaber Darman |
| Head coach | (Portugal) Ilídio Vale |
| Assistant coach | (Portugal) Joaquim Milheiro (Portugal) Francisco Sá |
| Goalkeeping coach | (Portugal) Silvinho Morais |
| Fitness coach | (France) Sebastien Braillard |
| Team doctor | (Portugal) Diogo Miranda Santos |

== Players ==
=== Current squad ===
The following 23 players were named in the squad for the friendly tournament on the 30 May to 10 June 2025 window.

Caps and goals correct as of 22 March, after the match against Thailand

| No. | Pos. | Player | Date of birth (age) | Caps | Goals | Club |
|---|---|---|---|---|---|---|
| | GK | Ali Ghulais | 17 May 2003 (age 23) | 1 | 0 | (Qatar Football Association) Al-Shamal |
| | GK | Amir Hassan | 22 April 2004 (age 22) | 4 | 0 | (Qatar Football Association) Al Duhail |
| | GK | Abubaker Osman | 25 September 2005 (age 21) | 0 | 0 | (Royal Spanish Football Federation) Calahorra |
| | DF | Nabil Irfan | 7 February 2004 (age 22) | 8 | 0 | (Qatar Football Association) Al-Wakrah |
| | DF | Ahmed Reyed | 28 September 2003 (age 23) | 3 | 0 | (Qatar Football Association) Al Ahli |
| | DF | Ahmed Hagana | 30 November 2003 (age 22) | 2 | 0 | (Qatar Football Association) Al-Khor |
| | DF | Hassan Al-Ghareeb | 22 May 2004 (age 22) | 1 | 0 | (Qatar Football Association) Lusail |
| | DF | Marwan Sherif | 1 March 2006 (age 20) | 0 | 0 | (Qatar Football Association) Al-Arabi |
| | DF | Rayan Al-Ali | 26 March 2006 (age 20) | 0 | 0 | (Qatar Football Association) Al-Gharafa |
| | DF | Abdalla Mugib | 12 December 2005 (age 20) | 0 | 0 | (Qatar Football Association) Al-Markhiya |
| | MF | Fares Said | 7 January 2003 (age 23) | 7 | 0 | (Qatar Football Association) Umm Salal |
| | MF | Anas Abweny | 11 September 2004 (age 22) | 9 | 0 | (Qatar Football Association) Al Shahaniya |
| | MF | Abdulaziz Mohammed | 28 November 2002 (age 23) | 4 | 0 | (Qatar Football Association) Al Shahaniya |
| | MF | Jassem Al-Sharshani | 2 January 2003 (age 23) | 3 | 0 | (Qatar Football Association) Al Ahli |
| | MF | Moath Taha | 12 October 2005 (age 21) | 0 | 0 | (Royal Spanish Football Federation) Calahorra |
| | MF | Tameem Al-Qadi | 19 May 2008 (age 18) | 0 | 0 | (Qatar Football Association) Al Sadd |
| | MF | Mahdi Salem | 4 April 2004 (age 22) | 7 | 0 | (Qatar Football Association) Al Sadd |
| | MF | Yazan Mohamed | 16 October 2008 (age 18) | 0 | 0 | (Qatar Football Association) Al-Duhail |
| | MF | Mostafa El-Sayed | 26 August 2004 (age 22) | 2 | 1 | (Qatar Football Association) Al-Rayyan |
| | FW | Mubarak Shanan | 20 February 2004 (age 22) | 8 | 0 | (Qatar Football Association) Al-Duhail |
| | FW | Rashid Al-Abdulla | 21 February 2004 (age 22) | 1 | 1 | (Qatar Football Association) Al-Duhail |
| | FW | Mohamed Surag | 21 April 2003 (age 23) | 1 | 0 | (Qatar Football Association) Al-Rayyan |

=== Previous squads ===
Olympic Games

- 1992 Summer Olympics

AFC U-23 Championship

- 2016 AFC U-23 Championship
- 2018 AFC U-23 Championship
- 2020 AFC U-23 Championship
- 2022 AFC U-23 Asian Cup
- 2024 AFC U-23 Asian Cup

Asian Games

- 2022 Asian Games

WAFF U-23 Championship

- 2015 WAFF U-23 Championship
- 2022 WAFF U-23 Championship

== Managers ==
| Period | Manager |
|---|---|
| 1998–1999 | (Netherlands) Jo Bonfrère |
| 1999–2000 | (Brazil) José Paulo |
| 2003 | (France) Alex Dupont |
| 2007 | (Morocco) Hassan Hormatallah |
| 2011–2012 | (Brazil) Paulo Autuori |
| 2012–2013 | (France) Alain Perrin |
| 2013 | (Netherlands) Marcel van Buuren |
| 2013–2014 | (Chile) Julio César Moreno |
| 2014–2017 | (Qatar) Fahad Thani |
| 2017–2020 | (Spain) Félix Sánchez |
| 2020–2022 | (Chile) Nicolás Córdova |
| 2023– | (Portugal) Ilídio Vale |

== Head-to-head record ==
The following table shows Qatar national under-23 football team's head-to-head record in the Football at the Summer Olympics and AFC U-23 Asian Cup.

=== In Football at the Summer Olympics ===
| Opponent | Pld | W | D | L | GF | GA | GD | Win % |
|---|---|---|---|---|---|---|---|---|
| Colombia | 1 | 0 | 1 | 0 | 1 | 1 | +0 | 0.00 |
| Egypt | 1 | 1 | 0 | 0 | 1 | 0 | +1 | 100.00 |
| Poland | 1 | 0 | 0 | 1 | 0 | 2 | −2 | 0.00 |
| Spain | 1 | 0 | 0 | 1 | 0 | 2 | −2 | 0.00 |
| Total | 4 | 1 | 1 | 2 | 2 | 5 | −3 | 25.00 |

=== In AFC U-23 Asian Cup ===
| Opponent | Pld | W | D | L | GF | GA | GD | Win % |
|---|---|---|---|---|---|---|---|---|
| Australia | 1 | 0 | 1 | 0 | 0 | 0 | +0 | 0.00 |
| China | 2 | 2 | 0 | 0 | 5 | 2 | +3 | 100.00 |
| Indonesia | 1 | 1 | 0 | 0 | 2 | 0 | +2 | 100.00 |
| Iran | 2 | 1 | 1 | 0 | 3 | 2 | +1 | 50.00 |
| Iraq | 1 | 0 | 0 | 1 | 1 | 2 | −1 | 0.00 |
| Japan | 3 | 0 | 1 | 2 | 3 | 7 | −4 | 0.00 |
| Jordan | 1 | 1 | 0 | 0 | 2 | 1 | +1 | 100.00 |
| North Korea | 1 | 1 | 0 | 0 | 2 | 1 | +1 | 100.00 |
| Oman | 1 | 1 | 0 | 0 | 1 | 0 | +1 | 100.00 |
| Palestine | 1 | 1 | 0 | 0 | 3 | 2 | +1 | 100.00 |
| Saudi Arabia | 1 | 0 | 1 | 0 | 0 | 0 | +0 | 0.00 |
| South Korea | 2 | 1 | 0 | 1 | 2 | 3 | −1 | 50.00 |
| Syria | 3 | 1 | 1 | 1 | 6 | 5 | +1 | 33.33 |
| Turkmenistan | 1 | 0 | 1 | 0 | 2 | 2 | +0 | 0.00 |
| United Arab Emirates | 1 | 0 | 0 | 1 | 0 | 2 | −2 | 0.00 |
| Uzbekistan | 2 | 1 | 0 | 1 | 1 | 6 | −5 | 50.00 |
| Vietnam | 1 | 0 | 1 | 0 | 2 | 2 | +0 | 0.00 |
| Total | 25 | 11 | 7 | 7 | 35 | 37 | −2 | 44.00 |

== See also ==
- Qatar national football team
- Qatar national under-20 football team
- Qatar national under-17 football team
