= Vietnam national under-23 football team =

Vietnam U-23
- Nickname(s): Những chiến binh sao vàng (Golden Star Warriors)
- Association: Vietnam Football Federation (VFF)
- Confederation: AFC (Asia)
- Sub-confederation: AFF (Southeast Asia)
- Head coach: Kim Sang-sik
- Captain: Cao Văn Bình
- Most caps: Nguyễn Công Phượng (64)
- Top scorer: Nguyễn Công Phượng (27)
- Home stadium: Various
- FIFA code: VIE
First colours	Second colours

First international
- Vietnam 1–1 Indonesia (Kuala Lumpur, Malaysia; 26 April 1999)

Biggest win
- Philippines 0–9 Vietnam (Yangon, Myanmar; 28 June 2012)

Biggest defeat
- Singapore 5–0 Vietnam (Nakhon Ratchasima, Thailand; 14 December 2007); Vietnam 0–5 Argentina U-20 (Hanoi, Vietnam; 14 May 2017)

AFC U-23 Asian Cup
- Appearances: 6 (first in 2016)
- Best result: Runners-up (2018)

Asian Games
- Appearances: 5 (first in 2002)
- Best result: Fourth place (2018)

Southeast Asian Games
- Appearances: 12 (first in 2001)
- Best result: (gold) Gold medal (2019, 2021, 2025)

ASEAN U-23 Championship
- Appearances: 4 (first in 2019)
- Best result: Champions (2022, 2023, 2025)
Medal record
SEA Games
Gold medal – first place	2019 Philippines	Team
Gold medal – first place	2021 Vietnam	Team
Gold medal – first place	2025 Thailand	Team
Silver medal – second place	2003 Vietnam	Team
Silver medal – second place	2005 Philippines	Team
Silver medal – second place	2009 Laos	Team
Bronze medal – third place	2015 Singapore	Team
Bronze medal – third place	2023 Cambodia	Team
AFC U-23 Championship
Silver medal – second place	2018 China	Team
Bronze medal – third place	2026 Saudi Arabia	Team
AFF U-23 Championship
Gold medal – first place	2022 Cambodia	Team
Gold medal – first place	2023 Thailand	Team
Gold medal – first place	2025 Indonesia	Team
Bronze medal – third place	2019 Cambodia	Team

The Vietnam national under-23 and Olympic football team (Vietnamese: Đội tuyển Bóng đá U-23 và Olympic Quốc gia Việt Nam) represents Vietnam in international football tournaments at the under-22 and under-23 age level.

== History ==
=== Early years and downfall ===
The team is considered to be the feeder team for the Vietnam national football team, with its successes and performance are usually consistent and closely associated with its senior counterpart. The under-23 team played their first unofficial matches in the 1997 Independence Cup, and played their first official match against Indonesia on 26 April 1999. The Vietnamese football team did not enjoy relative success until 2003, when they came second in that year's Southeast Asian Games as hosts.

During the 2005 Southeast Asian Games in the Philippines, a betting and match-fixing scandal involving the team captain Lê Quốc Vượng shocked the team reputation. The scandal destroyed the careers of several players on the squad, including striker Phạm Văn Quyến and shattered Vietnamese public image towards the youth team, making many of their football fans stay away from the sport along with the a dramatic decrease in attendance for matches.

=== Youth redevelopment and revival ===
In 2007, the Hoàng Anh Gia Lai – Arsenal JMG Academy was established through a partnership with Arsenal F.C., JMG Academy and the Vietnamese privately owned Hoàng Anh Gia Lai Corporation to revive the Vietnamese youth football. Through training of the Vietnamese youth players in the academy, this subsequently produced many new talented players which became part of the new generation of under-23s.

However, the redevelopment program wouldn't bring immediate success. Although Vietnam was able to produce some surprising performances in tournaments, such as reaching the round of 16 in the 2014 Asian Games, the team generally failed to deliver the expected regional dominance, most notably coming second in the 2009 Southeast Asian Games as favorites to win the tournament and only finishing third in the 2015 Southeast Asian Games with an extremely talented squad. The greatest disappointment came in the 2017 Southeast Asian Games, when Vietnam were eliminated in the group stage despite the squad being regarded as the most talented squad since the revival period, containing many players who had participated in the 2017 FIFA U-20 World Cup.

=== AFC U-23 Asian Cup ===
==== 2016 AFC U-23 Championship ====
Under Japanese coach Toshiya Miura, Vietnam made their debut in the tournament having qualified from the AFC U-23 qualification in 2016. Positioned in Group I in the qualifiers, Vietnam claimed their first victory over Malaysia by beating them 2–1, though they would lose 0–2 to Japan afterwards but managed to bounce back with a 7–0 win over Macau in their last group match, and became the group runners-up. The team was then placed in Group D, where they lost 1–3 to Jordan, 0–2 to Australia, and 2–3 to United Arab Emirates.

==== 2018 AFC U-23 Championship and the beginning of the Golden Generation ====

AFC U-23 Championship 2018 final starting line-up.

The team made their second entry in this tournament under South Korean coach Park Hang-seo having qualified from the AFC U-23 qualification in 2018. Drawn again in Group I in the qualifiers, the team started their first match with a 4–0 victory over Timor-Leste before accomplishing a great win of 8–1 over Macau. Although they lost to South Korea by 1–2 in the third group match, Vietnam qualified to the AFC U-23 Championship as the Group I runners-up. The team then placed again in Group D. Although they lost again to South Korea by 1–2, the team bounced back and defeated Australia by 1–0 before drawing 0–0 with Syria. The team became the group runners-up and subsequently became the first Southeast Asian team, alongside Malaysia, who were able to qualify into the quarter finals for the first time in the tournament as well in both teams' history. At the quarter finals, Vietnam managed to lead the match into additional time with a draw score of 3–3 against former champion Iraq, before winning the penalty shoot-out by 5–3, sending the team to semi-finals. The team then met Qatar with the match ending in another draw of 2–2 where they won the match with their second penalty shoot-out of the tournament by 4–3, resulting in the team being the first Southeast Asian football team in history to go to the finals in the competition's history and for the first time ever Vietnam had participated in the final of an AFC competition. At the finals, Vietnam lost to Uzbekistan by 1–2, claiming second place. Despite Vietnam's failure to win the tournament, this was hailed as a historic achievement for Vietnam and the team received national wide welcome after returning from China and subsequently honored by the state for its historic performance.

==== 2020 AFC U-23 Championship ====
Vietnam tried to run for the race to host the competition, but was eventually beaten by Thailand over the hosting rights. Thus, Vietnam had to take part on the 2020 AFC U-23 Championship qualification where Vietnam was seeded together with Thailand, Indonesia and Brunei, Thailand officially qualified regardless of results. Even though being seeded in a tough group, Vietnam went on to overcome both opponents with over 11 goals scored and conceded none, topping the group with a perfect fashion including the famed 4–0 win over Thailand. In the main stage which served as the qualification for the 2020 Summer Olympics, Vietnam was again seeded into group D where they would once again reunite with Jordan and the United Arab Emirates, alongside North Korea. They had two 0-0 draws over United Arab Emirates and Jordan, before lose to North Korea by 1-2 and being eliminated by finished last place in the group.

==== 2022 AFC U-23 Asian Cup ====
Vietnam were drawn in Group I of the 2022 qualifiers, along with Myanmar and Chinese Taipei, defeating both teams with narrow 1–0 victories to qualify for the main tournament. Vietnam was seeded into Group C with defending champions South Korea along with neighbors Thailand and Malaysia. After Park Hang-seo's exit from the under-23 national team, Vietnam entered the 2022 AFC U-23 Asian Cup under the brief management of Gong Oh-kyun. Vietnam played their first match against rivals Thailand; despite taking the lead twice, Vietnam was forced to share a point with Thailand. The Golden Star Warriors then met South Korea, managing to produce a shock 1–1 draw, and defeated Malaysia 2–0 to reach the quarter-finals for the second time. However, Vietnam's campaign would end with a 0–2 defeat to eventual champions Saudi Arabia.

==== 2024 AFC U-23 Asian Cup ====
In the 2024 AFC U-23 Asian Cup qualification, Vietnam was positioned in Group C as hosts along with Yemen, Singapore and Guam. The team topped the group with a dominant 6–0 win against Guam and a close 1–0 victory against Yemen, before drawing 2–2 to Singapore to qualify for the final tournament. Vietnam were then drawn in Group D along with Uzbekistan, Kuwait and Malaysia. The team started the campaign with comfortable 3–1 and 2–0 wins against Kuwait and Malaysia, respectively, before losing 0–3 to Uzbekistan in the final match, missing the chance to top the group. In the quarter-finals, Vietnam suffered a tough 0–1 defeat to Iraq and thus were eliminated, missing the chance to qualify for the 2024 Summer Olympics.

==== 2026 AFC U-23 Asian Cup ====

2026 AFC U-23 Asian Cup third place match starting line-up.

Vietnam took part in the 2026 qualifiers, being placed into Group C, reuniting with Yemen and Singapore, and also meeting Bangladesh. Under the leadership of new manager Kim Sang-sik, Vietnam started the qualifiers with a 2–0 win against Bangladesh, followed up by 1–0 wins against Singapore and Yemen to qualify for the 2026 AFC U-23 Asian Cup with three out of three wins. Unlike the previous two editions, Vietnam found themselves in a much more difficult group, being seeded in Group A with hosts Saudi Arabia, Jordan and debutants Kyrgyzstan. Vietnam begun their campaign with a surprising 2–0 win against Jordan as underdogs, before defeating Kyrgyzstan 2–1 in the second match. After that, Vietnam achieved an upset 1–0 victory against hosts Saudi Arabia, topping the group with all nine points acquired for the first time in history. After a perfect group stage performance, Vietnam met United Arab Emirates in the quarter-finals. Vietnam managed to overcome the United Arab Emirates 3–2 in extra-time, reaching the semi-finals for the second time ever. However, the team's ambitions for the historic title would come to an end as they suffered a 0–3 defeat to China in the semi-finals. Following the semi-final defeat, the "Golden Star Warriors" then met South Korea in the third-place match. After dragging the match to extra time with a thrilling 2–2 draw, Vietnam produced another astonishing victory as they defeated Korea 7–6 on penalties, finishing their 2026 campaign finishing at third place. This is the first time that Vietnam defeat South Korea in U23's level in history. Similarly to 2018, the squad was praised for its remarkable performance during the tournament.

=== Asian Games ===
==== 2018 Asian Games ====

2018 Asian Games Bronze medal match starting line-up.

In the 2018 Asian Games, Vietnam made another remarkable achievement under the guidance of coach Park as they qualified to the semi-finals for the first time in their history with a clean sheet. Drawn in Group D, the team beat Pakistan by 3–0, Nepal by 2–0, and former champion Japan by 1–0 to lead the group. In the second round, Vietnam then met Bahrain and defeated them by 1–0 before defeating Syria 1–0 in the quarter-finals in a match that went to overtime. At the semi-finals, Vietnam met the defending champion South Korea, led by their 2018 FIFA World Cup players such as pair strikers Son Heung-min, Hwang Hee-chan and their goalkeeper Jo Hyeon-woo, where they failed to continue their path to the finals after losing by 1–3. The team then met United Arab Emirates for the bronze medal match. The score remained 1–1 after extra time, and they ended up losing the penalty shoot-out 3–4.

==== 2022 Asian Games ====
Olympic Vietnam participated in the 2022 Asian Games. The tournament, scheduled to begin in September 2022, was delayed to September–October 2023 due to the COVID-19 pandemic. Vietnam were seeded into a difficult Group B along with Saudi Arabia, Iran and Mongolia. After a 4–2 win against Mongolia in the opening match, Vietnam faced heavy 0–4 and 1–3 defeats to Iran and Saudi Arabia, finishing third in the group. Out of the five groups, Vietnam ranked worst among the third-placed teams, and thus were eliminated early from the competition.

==== 2026 Asian Games ====
Vietnam was unable to assemble their best squad in preparation for the 2026 Asian Games, due to the schedule colliding with the national team's 2026 FIFA ASEAN Cup campaign. Caretaker coach Đinh Hồng Vinh replaced Kim Sang-sik as Olympic Vietnam's manager for the 2026 Asian Games. U-23 Vietnam was positioned in Group C alongside Uzbekistan, Philippines and Kuwait. Vietnam started the campaign with an underwhelming 1–1 draw against Kuwait, followed by an 2–0 victory over the Philippines. Although they lost 0–2 to Uzbekistan in the final group match, they finished second of Group C and advanced to the knockouts. However, Vietnam's run ended with an 0–4 defeat over eventual winners South Korea in the quarter-finals.

=== Southeast Asian Games ===
==== 2019 Southeast Asian Games ====

2019 SEA Games Gold medal match starting line-up.

The victory in the 2019 football edition of the Southeast Asian Games is considered as the country first ever SEA Games men's football title since the Vietnamese reunification, having won the first edition of the 1959 Southeast Asian Peninsular Games through South Vietnam. In the 2019 edition, Vietnam opened their campaign in Group B with a large victory over Brunei by 6–0 as well as Laos by 6–1 before defeating Indonesia and Singapore through a slim win by 2–1 and 1–0 respectively. In their last match in the group, Vietnam able to drawn itself by 2–2 against long-time SEA Games men's dominating champion Thailand after being left by two goals in the earlier minutes. After successfully securing themselves in the top group standings, they then meet the rising team of Cambodia in the semi-finals and defeat them with a large win of 4–0 before meeting Indonesia again in the final and defeat them by 3–0 to secure the title after 60 years long-waited.

==== 2021 Southeast Asian Games ====

2021 SEA Games Gold medal match starting line-up.

Due to the COVID-19 pandemic, the 2021 Southeast Asian Games hosted by Vietnam, were postponed to 2022. Playing in front of their home fans, Vietnam would successfully defend their SEA Games title, as coach Park Hang-seo in his last tournament for the U23/Olympic team, led the nation to their 2nd consecutive gold medal. Vietnam began their campaign in the 31st SEA Games with a comfortable 3–0 win over Indonesia. However, they failed to breakthrough in the second match, as Vietnam were held to a draw against the Philippines by a score of 0–0. Vietnam would bounce back and win both of their last group matches against Myanmar and Timor-Leste to advance to the knockout stage. Vietnam also narrowly defeated Malaysia in a thrilling semi-final match that went to extra time, to advance to the final with a 1–0 victory. Facing their biggest rivals Thailand, an 83rd-minute winner by Nhâm Mạnh Dũng erupted the Mỹ Đình National Stadium in cheers as Vietnam won back-to-back gold medals in the SEA Games football tournament. Vietnam ended their final match with no goals conceded, a SEA Games record, before coach Park Hang-seo left the Under-23/Olympic team.

==== 2023 Southeast Asian Games ====
After the victory at the 2021 SEA Games, coach Park Hang-seo left the Vietnamese team. Subsequently, Vietnam participated in the 2023 Southeast Asian Games under the management of Philippe Troussier. Vietnam were seeded into Group B, along with Thailand, Malaysia, Laos and Singapore. Vietnam achieved comfortable wins against Laos (2–0) and Singapore (3–1) in the opening matches, and narrowly defeated Malaysia 2–1 to guarantee their qualification to the knockouts. After a 1–1 draw against Thailand, the team finished second in Group B (lower goal difference compared to Thailand) and would face Group A winners Indonesia. Against 10-men Indonesia, Vietnam squandered many chances in the semi-final match and lost 2–3 in the dying minutes, unable to win their third gold medal in a row. Regardless, Vietnam managed to win the third-place match against Myanmar 3–1 and secured the bronze medal.

==== 2025 Southeast Asian Games ====
U-22 Vietnam took part in the 2025 Southeast Asian Games with the determination to win their fourth gold medal, having won the 2025 ASEAN U-23 Championship a few months prior under coach Kim Sang-sik. Vietnam were drawn into Group B along with Malaysia and Laos. The team started their journey with a close 2–1 win against Laos in the opening match, followed up with a 2–0 victory against Malaysia to top the group and qualify for the semi-finals, where they would meet the Philippines. The semi-final match went goalless for the majority of the game, but two last-minute goals secured a dramatic 2–0 win for Vietnam and sent the team to the final. Playing against hosts Thailand, who had a dominant route to the final, Vietnam did not perform well in the first half and trailed 0–2 by half-time. However, the Golden Star Warriors fought back hard in the second half and managed to level the score 2–2, putting the match into extra time. Vietnam would then complete the comeback by securing a 3–2 win at extra time, silencing the Rajamangala Stadium and winning their fourth gold medal in history. Combined with the national team's success in 2024 ASEAN Championship and the U-23 team's victory at the ASEAN U-23 Championship, 2025 became a year where Vietnam achieved dominance in ASEAN football.

== Kits and sponsors ==
=== Kit suppliers ===
Kit supplier	Period	Notes
Adidas	1996–2005	
Li-Ning	2006–2008	
Nike	2009–2013	
(Thailand) Grand Sport	2014–2023	
Jogarbola	2024–2027	

=== Sponsorship ===
Primary sponsors include: Honda, Yanmar, Grand Sport, Sony, Bia Saigon, Acecook, Coca-Cola, Vinamilk, Kao Vietnam, Herbalife Nutrition and TNI Corporation.

=== Broadcasting rights ===
==== SEA Games ====
Television channel	Period	Ref.
FPT Play	2021 - present	
VOV	2013 - present	
VTV	2003 - present	
VTC	2005 - 2023	
HTV	2003 - present	
HanoiTV	2003, 2021 - present	
Q.net Television	2023 - present	

==== Asian Games ====
Television channel	Period	Ref.
VTV	2002 - 2010, 2026	
VTVCab	2014	
VOV	2018	
VTC	2018	
Historical Witness TV	2022	

==== AFC U-23 Asian Cup ====
Television channel	Period	Ref.
VTV	2016 - present	
FPT Play	2022 - 2024	
HTV	2026 -	
TV360	2026 - 2028	

==== ASEAN U-23 Championship ====
Television channel	Period	Ref.
VTV	2019 - present	
FPT Play	2022, 2025	
SCTV	2023	

== Results and fixtures ==
The following is a list of match results in the last 12 months, as well as any future matches that have been scheduled.

Win Draw Loss Fixture

=== 2025 ===
3 December 2025 SEA Games GS	Laos	1–2	Vietnam	Bangkok, Thailand
16:00 UTC+7	Khampane 33'	Report	Nguyễn Đình Bắc 28', 60'	Stadium: Rajamangala Stadium; Referee: Rustam Lutfullin (Uzbekistan)

11 December 2025 SEA Games GS	Vietnam	2–0	Malaysia	Bangkok, Thailand
16:00 UTC+7	Nguyễn Hiểu Minh 11'; Phạm Minh Phúc 22'	Report		Stadium: Rajamangala Stadium; Referee: Qasim Al-Hatmi (Qatar)

15 December 2025 SEA Games SF	Vietnam	2–0	Philippines	Bangkok, Thailand
15:30 UTC+7	Lê Văn Thuận 89'; Nguyễn Thanh Nhàn 90+2'	Report		Stadium: Rajamangala Stadium; Referee: Choi Hyun-jai (South Korea)

18 December 2025 SEA Games Gold Medal Match	Thailand	2–3 (a.e.t.)	Vietnam	Bangkok, Thailand
19:30 UTC+7	Yotsakorn 20'; Seksan 31'	Report	Nguyễn Đình Bắc 49' (pen.); Waris 60' (o.g.); Nguyễn Thanh Nhàn 96'	Stadium: Rajamangala Stadium; Attendance: 17,736; Referee: Mooud Bonyadifard (Iran)

30 December Friendly	Syria	2–1	Vietnam	Doha, Qatar
15:00 UTC+3	Mhanna 39'; Osman 57'	Report	Nguyễn Lê Phát 88'	Stadium: Hamad bin Khalifa Stadium

=== 2026 ===
6 January 2026 AFC U-23 Asian Cup GS	Vietnam	2–0	Jordan	Jeddah, Saudi Arabia
14:30 UTC+3	Nguyễn Đình Bắc 15' (pen.); Nguyễn Hiểu Minh 42'	Report		Stadium: King Abdullah Sports City Hall Stadium; Attendance: 219; Referee: Choi Hyun-jai (South Korea)

9 January 2026 AFC U-23 Asian Cup GS	Kyrgyzstan	1–2	Vietnam	Jeddah, Saudi Arabia
17:00 UTC+3	Murzakhmatov 44'	Report	Khuất Văn Khang 19' (pen.); Brauzman 87' (o.g.)	Stadium: King Abdullah Sports City Hall Stadium; Attendance: 346; Referee: Payam Heydari (Iran)

12 January 2026 AFC U-23 Asian Cup GS	Saudi Arabia	0–1	Vietnam	Jeddah, Saudi Arabia
19:30 UTC+3		Report	Nguyễn Đình Bắc 64'	Stadium: Prince Abdullah Al-Faisal Sports City Stadium; Attendance: 4,919; Referee: Alex King (Australia)

16 January 2026 AFC U-23 Asian Cup QF	Vietnam	3–2 (a.e.t.)	United Arab Emirates	Jeddah, Saudi Arabia
18:30 UTC+3	Nguyễn Lê Phát 39'; Nguyễn Đình Bắc 62'; Phạm Minh Phúc 101'	Report	Ndiaye 42'; Al-Menhali 68'	Stadium: Prince Abdullah Al-Faisal Sports City Stadium; Attendance: 211; Referee: Payam Heydari (Iran)

20 January 2026 AFC U-23 Asian Cup SF	Vietnam	0–3	China	Jeddah, Saudi Arabia
18:30 UTC+3		Report	Peng Xiao 47'; Xiang Yuwang 52'; Wang Yudong 90+8'	Stadium: Prince Abdullah Al-Faisal Sports City Stadium; Attendance: 1,141; Referee: Alex King (Australia)

23 January 2026 AFC U-23 Asian Cup 3rd	Vietnam	2–2 (a.e.t.) (7–6 p)	South Korea	Jeddah, Saudi Arabia
18:00 UTC+3	Nguyễn Quốc Việt 30'; Nguyễn Đình Bắc 71'	Report	Kim Tae-won 69'; Shin Min-ha 90+7'	Stadium: King Abdullah Sports City Hall Stadium; Attendance: 270; Referee: Abdullah Jamali (Kuwait)
	Penalties
	Khuất Văn Khang (penalty scored); Phạm Minh Phúc (penalty scored); Nguyễn Thái Quốc Cường (penalty scored); Nguyễn Ngọc Mỹ (penalty scored); Nguyễn Nhật Minh (penalty scored); Nguyễn Xuân Bắc (penalty scored); Nguyễn Thanh Nhàn (penalty scored)		(penalty scored) Kim Tae-won; (penalty scored) Kang Seong-jin; (penalty scored) Lee Chan-wook; (penalty scored) Kim Yong-hak; (penalty scored) Lee Hyun-yong; (penalty scored) Jang Seok-hwan; (penalty missed) Bae Hyun-seo

25 March 2026 CFA Team China Cup	Vietnam	1–1	North Korea	Xi'an, China
15:00 UTC+8	Nguyễn Minh Tâm 6'	Report	An Kyong-ung 80'	Stadium: Fengdong Football Park East Stadium

28 March 2026 CFA Team China Cup	Thailand	1–0	Vietnam	Xi'an, China
15:00 UTC+8	Thanakrit 1'	Report		Stadium: Fengdong Football Park East Stadium; Referee: Ma Ning (China)

31 March 2026 CFA Team China Cup	China	1–0	Vietnam	Xi'an, China
19:35 UTC+8	Du Yuezheng 39'	Report		Stadium: Xi'an International Football Center; Attendance: 16,163; Referee: Tang Shunqi (China)

15 September 2026 Asian Games GS	Vietnam	1–1	Kuwait	Nagoya, Japan
19:00 UTC+9	Nguyễn Ngọc Mỹ 80'	Report	Al-Matar 78'	Stadium: CS Asset Minato Soccer Stadium; Attendance: 1,058; Referee: Kim Woo-sung (South Korea)

18 September 2026 Asian Games GS	Philippines	0–2	Vietnam	Nagoya, Japan
15:30 UTC+9		Report	Nguyễn Thanh Nhàn 74'; Nguyễn Lê Phát 87'	Stadium: CS Asset Minato Soccer Stadium; Attendance: 513; Referee: Hiroki Kasahara (Japan)

22 September 2026 Asian Games GS	Vietnam	0–2	Uzbekistan	Nagoya, Japan
14:00 UTC+9		Report	Urinboev 5'; Ibraimov 67'	Stadium: Paloma Mizuho Rugby Stadium; Attendance: 4,134; Referee: Meder Taichiev (Kyrgyzstan)

25 September 2026 Asian Games QF	South Korea	4–0	Vietnam	Nagoya, Japan
19:30 UTC+9	Lee Young-jun 15', 81'; Kim Ji-soo 77'; Kim Myung-jun 88'	Report		Stadium: Paloma Mizuho Rugby Stadium; Attendance: 2,167; Referee: Firdavs Nosafarov (Uzbekistan)

10 November 2026 Gia Lai U-23 VTV Cup	Vietnam	3–0	Thailand	Gia Lai, Vietnam
19:00 UTC+7	Nguyễn Minh Tâm 17', 45'; Williams Minh Hoàng 88' (pen.)	Report		Stadium: Pleiku Stadium; Attendance: 10,011; Referee: Razlan Joffri Ali (Malaysia)

12 November 2026 Gia Lai U-23 VTV Cup	Singapore	0–1	Vietnam	Gia Lai, Vietnam
19:00 UTC+7		Report	Nguyễn Bảo Long 70'	Stadium: Pleiku Stadium; Attendance: 6,268; Referee: Clifford Daypuyat (Philippines)

14 November 2026 Gia Lai U-23 VTV Cup	Vietnam	1–1	Qatar	Gia Lai, Vietnam
19:00 UTC+7	Nguyễn Minh Tâm 48'	Report	Faragalla 20'	Stadium: Pleiku Stadium; Attendance: 10,068; Referee: Razlan Joffri Ali (Malaysia)

== Players ==
=== Current squad ===
The following 26 players are called up for the 2026 Gia Lai U-23 VTV Cup in November 2026.

Caps and goals as of 14 November 2026 after the match against Qatar.
Names in bold denote players who have been capped for the senior team.

No.	Pos.	Player	Date of birth (age)	Caps	Goals	Club
1	GK	Cao Văn Bình (captain)	8 January 2005 (age 21)	22	0	(Vietnam Football Federation) Sông Lam Nghệ An
13	GK	Phạm Đình Hải	29 March 2006 (age 20)	0	0	(Vietnam Football Federation) Hà Nội
23	GK	Nguyễn Vũ Khang	12 April 2005 (age 21)	0	0	(Vietnam Football Federation) Hoàng Anh Gia Lai
2	DF	Nguyễn Quốc Quang Huy	6 February 2007 (age 19)	0	0	(Vietnam Football Federation) Hoàng Anh Gia Lai
3	DF	Lê Nguyên Hoàng	14 February 2005 (age 21)	22	0	(Vietnam Football Federation) Sông Lam Nghệ An
4	DF	Nguyễn Mạnh Hưng	8 August 2005 (age 21)	9	0	(Vietnam Football Federation) Hưng Yên
5	DF	Nguyễn Lương Tuấn Khải	14 November 2006 (age 20)	4	0	(Vietnam Football Federation) Huế
12	DF	Nguyễn Bảo Long	23 August 2005 (age 21)	9	1	(Vietnam Football Federation) Công An Nhân Dân
16	DF	Nguyễn Anh Tiệp	2 February 2006 (age 20)	2	0	(Vietnam Football Federation) Hà Nội
20	DF	**Đinh Quang Kiệt**	16 July 2007 (age 19)	6	0	(Vietnam Football Federation) Công An HCMC
21	DF	Vũ Quốc Anh	3 May 2005 (age 21)	3	0	(Vietnam Football Federation) Hải Phòng
24	DF	Nguyễn Cảnh Tài	29 January 2005 (age 21)	1	0	(Vietnam Football Federation) Thái Nguyên
25	DF	Nguyễn Quốc Toản	8 January 2006 (age 20)	5	0	(Vietnam Football Federation) Quy Nhơn United
26	DF	Bùi Thanh Đức	6 March 2006 (age 20)	1	0	(Vietnam Football Federation) Sông Lam Nghệ An
6	MF	Cao Hoàng Minh	1 June 2003 (age 23)	3	0	(Vietnam Football Federation) Hoàng Anh Gia Lai
7	MF	**Ngô Đăng Khoa**	30 June 2006 (age 20)	3	0	(Vietnam Football Federation) Công An HCMC
8	MF	Nguyễn Đức Phú	13 January 2003 (age 23)	20	0	(Vietnam Football Federation) Công An HCMC
11	MF	Lê Văn Thuận	15 July 2006 (age 20)	28	3	(Vietnam Football Federation) Ninh Bình
14	MF	Lê Văn Quang Duyệt	11 May 2005 (age 21)	3	0	(Vietnam Football Federation) SHB Đà Nẵng
15	MF	Tạ Xuân Trường	21 October 2005 (age 21)	2	0	(Vietnam Football Federation) Hưng Yên
17	MF	Thái Bá Đạt	23 March 2005 (age 21)	7	0	(Vietnam Football Federation) Công An Nhân Dân
22	MF	Lê Đình Long Vũ	27 May 2006 (age 20)	13	0	(Vietnam Football Federation) Sông Lam Nghệ An
9	FW	Nguyễn Hoàng Anh	12 January 2006 (age 20)	2	0	(Vietnam Football Federation) Công An Nhân Dân
10	FW	**Williams Minh Hoàng**	2 April 2007 (age 19)	3	1	(Vietnam Football Federation) Công An HCMC
18	FW	Nguyễn Minh Tâm	20 November 2005 (age 21)	6	4	(Vietnam Football Federation) Hoàng Anh Gia Lai
19	FW	Trần Gia Bảo	3 January 2008 (age 18)	3	0	(Vietnam Football Federation) Hoàng Anh Gia Lai

=== Recent call-ups ===
The following players have been called up for the team within the last 12 months and are still available for selection.

Pos.	Player	Date of birth (age)	Caps	Goals	Club	Latest call-up
GK	Nguyễn Bảo Ngọc	28 March 2007 (age 19)	0	0	(Vietnam) Sông Lam Nghệ An	2026 Asian Games
GK	Hoa Xuân Tín	29 January 2008 (age 18)	0	0	(Vietnam) Công An HCMC	2026 Asian Games
GK	Trần Đức Duy	26 August 2005 (age 21)	0	0	(Vietnam) Thể Công-Viettel	Centralized training camp, August 2026
GK	**Trần Trung Kiên**	9 February 2003 (age 23)	19	0	(Vietnam) Hoàng Anh Gia Lai	2026 AFC U-23 Asian Cup
GK	Nguyễn Tân	16 July 2005 (age 21)	2	0	(Vietnam) Công An HCMC	2026 AFC U-23 Asian Cup ^{INJ}
DF	**Phạm Lý Đức**	14 February 2003 (age 23)	24	1	(Vietnam) Công An Nhân Dân	2026 Asian Games
DF	Nguyễn Đức Anh	16 May 2003 (age 23)	17	0	(Vietnam) Hà Nội	2026 Asian Games
DF	Đặng Tuấn Phong	7 February 2003 (age 23)	9	0	(Vietnam) Hải Phòng	2026 Asian Games
DF	Võ Anh Quân	7 May 2004 (age 22)	21	0	(Vietnam) Công An Nhân Dân	Centralized training camp, August 2026
DF	Lê Thắng Long	17 February 2006 (age 20)	3	0	(Vietnam) Bắc Ninh	Centralized training camp, August 2026
DF	Trần Hải Anh	16 August 2005 (age 21)	2	0	(Vietnam) Hưng Yên	2026 CFA Team China Cup
DF	Mai Quốc Tú	10 July 2005 (age 21)	1	0	(Vietnam) SHB Đà Nẵng	2026 CFA Team China Cup
DF	Nguyễn Trung Nguyên	28 May 2007 (age 19)	0	0	(Vietnam) SHB Đà Nẵng	2026 CFA Team China Cup
DF	Trương Nhạc Minh	24 January 2006 (age 20)	0	0	(Vietnam) Hồ Chí Minh City	2026 CFA Team China Cup ^{INJ}
DF	**Nguyễn Nhật Minh**	27 July 2003 (age 23)	27	0	(Vietnam) Công An HCMC	2026 AFC U-23 Asian Cup
DF	**Nguyễn Hiểu Minh** (vice-captain)	5 August 2004 (age 22)	24	5	(Vietnam) Công An Nhân Dân	2026 AFC U-23 Asian Cup
DF	Lê Văn Hà	1 July 2004 (age 22)	14	0	(Vietnam) Hà Nội	2026 AFC U-23 Asian Cup
MF	Trần Thành Trung	23 May 2005 (age 21)	3	0	(Vietnam) Ninh Bình	2026 Gia Lai U-23 VTV Cup ^{INJ}
MF	Nguyễn Trọng Tuấn	18 January 2006 (age 20)	0	0	(Vietnam) Hưng Yên	2026 Gia Lai U-23 VTV Cup ^{INJ}
MF	Nguyễn Phi Hoàng	27 March 2003 (age 23)	31	0	(Vietnam) Công An HCMC	2026 Asian Games
MF	Nguyễn Xuân Bắc	3 February 2003 (age 23)	27	1	(Vietnam) Công An Nhân Dân	2026 Asian Games
MF	Phạm Minh Phúc	7 February 2004 (age 22)	23	3	(Vietnam) Công An Nhân Dân	2026 Asian Games
MF	Nguyễn Thái Quốc Cường	6 March 2004 (age 22)	20	0	(Vietnam) Công An HCMC	2026 Asian Games
MF	Nguyễn Quang Vinh	27 January 2005 (age 21)	7	0	(Vietnam) Sông Lam Nghệ An	2026 Asian Games
MF	Nguyễn Hoàng Khanh	26 March 2006 (age 20)	2	0	(Vietnam) Thể Công-Viettel	2026 Asian Games
MF	Hoàng Quang Dũng	18 February 2005 (age 21)	1	0	(Vietnam) Huế	2026 Asian Games
MF	Nguyễn Công Phương	3 June 2006 (age 20)	16	1	(Vietnam) Hải Phòng	2026 Asian Games ^{INJ}
MF	Viktor Le	10 November 2003 (age 23)	19	2	(Vietnam) Công An Nhân Dân	Centralized training camp, August 2026
MF	Vadim Nguyen	22 February 2005 (age 21)	5	0	(Vietnam) Công An Nhân Dân	2026 CFA Team China Cup
MF	Quách Quang Huy	8 March 2005 (age 21)	2	0	(Vietnam) Quy Nhơn United	2026 CFA Team China Cup
MF	Lê Nguyễn Văn Thọ	10 May 2005 (age 21)	0	0	(Vietnam) Thép Cần Thơ	2026 CFA Team China Cup ^{PRE}
MF	**Khuất Văn Khang** (captain)	11 May 2003 (age 23)	48	5	(Vietnam) Thể Công-Viettel	2026 AFC U-23 Asian Cup
MF	**Nguyễn Thái Sơn**	13 July 2003 (age 23)	40	1	(Vietnam) Ninh Bình	2026 AFC U-23 Asian Cup
MF	Nguyễn Đức Việt	1 January 2004 (age 22)	23	0	(Vietnam) Ninh Bình	2025 SEA Games ^{PRE}
FW	Nguyễn Quốc Việt	4 May 2003 (age 23)	48	9	(Vietnam) Ninh Bình	2026 Asian Games
FW	**Nguyễn Thanh Nhàn**	28 July 2003 (age 23)	37	6	(Vietnam) Công An Nhân Dân	2026 Asian Games
FW	Nguyễn Ngọc Mỹ	20 February 2004 (age 22)	18	2	(Vietnam) Ninh Bình	2026 Asian Games
FW	Nguyễn Lê Phát	12 January 2007 (age 19)	14	3	(Vietnam) Ninh Bình	2026 Asian Games
FW	Nguyễn Đăng Dương	7 September 2005 (age 21)	5	0	(Vietnam) Hưng Yên	Centralized training camp, August 2026
FW	Nguyễn Anh Tuấn	19 September 2005 (age 21)	2	0	(Vietnam) Quy Nhơn United	2026 CFA Team China Cup
FW	Nguyễn Trọng Sơn	19 June 2006 (age 20)	0	0	(Vietnam) Becamex HCMC	2026 CFA Team China Cup ^{PRE}
FW	Antonio Morić	11 May 2008 (age 18)	0	0	(Croatia) Rudeš	2026 CFA Team China Cup ^{PRE}
FW	**Nguyễn Đình Bắc** (vice-captain)	19 August 2004 (age 22)	31	10	(Vietnam) Công An Hà Nội	2026 AFC U-23 Asian Cup
FW	**Bùi Vĩ Hào**	24 February 2003 (age 23)	15	2	(Vietnam) Becamex HCMC	2026 AFC U-23 Asian Cup ^{INJ}
Players in **bold** have capped for the senior team.; ^{PRE} Preliminary squad; ^{INJ} Player withdrew from the squad due to an injury.; ^{SEN} Player withdrew from the squad due to a call up to the senior team.; ^{SUS} Serving suspension.; ^{WD} Player withdrew from the squad due to other reasons.

=== Overage players in Asian Games ===
Tournament	Player 1	Player 2	Player 3
2002	Phùng Thanh Phương (MF)	Lê Hồng Minh (MF)	did not select
2006	Lê Hồng Minh (MF)	Thạch Bảo Khanh (FW)	Nguyễn Huy Hoàng (DF)
2010	Nguyễn Minh Đức (DF)	Nguyễn Anh Đức (FW)	Bùi Tấn Trường (GK)
2014	Vũ Minh Tuấn (MF)	did not select	
2018	Nguyễn Anh Đức (FW)	Nguyễn Văn Quyết (MF)	Đỗ Hùng Dũng (MF)
2022	Đỗ Sỹ Huy (GK)	did not select	
2026	did not select		

=== Previous squads ===
AFF U-23 Championship

- 2019 AFF U-22 Youth Championship
- **2022 AFF U-23 Championship**
- **2023 AFF U-23 Championship**
- **2025 ASEAN U-23 Championship**

SEA Games

- 2005 SEA Games
- 2007 SEA Games
- 2009 SEA Games
- 2011 SEA Games
- 2013 SEA Games
- 2015 SEA Games
- 2017 SEA Games
- **2019 SEA Games**
- **2021 SEA Games**
- 2023 SEA Games
- **2025 SEA Games**

Asian Games

- 2006 Asian Games
- 2010 Asian Games
- 2014 Asian Games
- 2018 Asian Games
- 2022 Asian Games
- 2026 Asian Games

AFC U-23 Asian Cup

- 2016 AFC U-23 Championship
- 2018 AFC U-23 Championship
- 2020 AFC U-23 Championship
- 2022 AFC U-23 Asian Cup
- 2024 AFC U-23 Asian Cup
- 2026 AFC U-23 Asian Cup

=== SEA Games gold-medalist captains ===
SEA Games gold-medalist captains of Vietnam

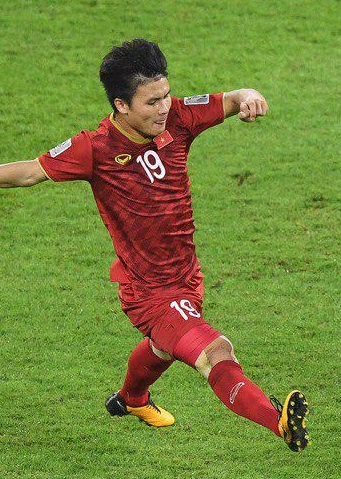
Nguyễn Quang Hải in 2019

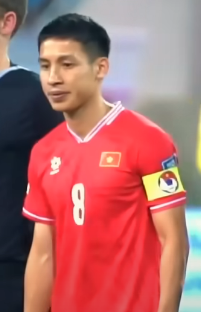
Đỗ Hùng Dũng in 2021

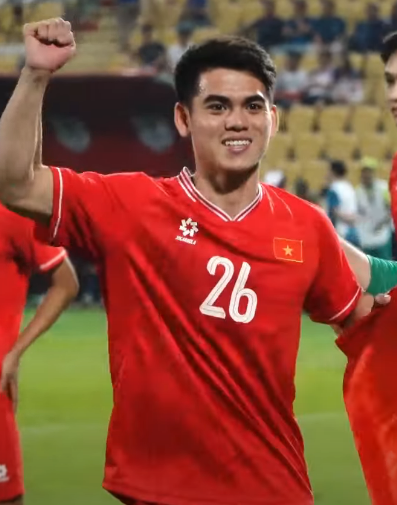
Khuất Văn Khang in 2025

Year	Player
2019	Nguyễn Quang Hải
2021	Đỗ Hùng Dũng
2025	Khuất Văn Khang

=== ASEAN U-23 Championship-winning captains ===
ASEAN U-23 Championship winning captains of Vietnam

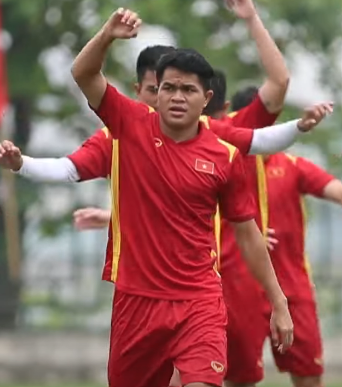
Dụng Quang Nho in 2022

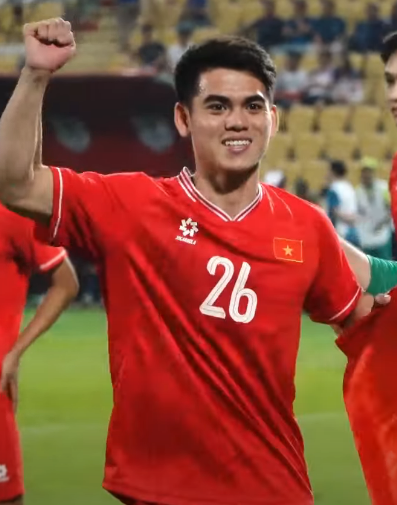
Khuất Văn Khang in 2025

Year	Player
2022	Dụng Quang Nho
2023	Quan Văn Chuẩn
2025	Khuất Văn Khang

== Coaching staff ==
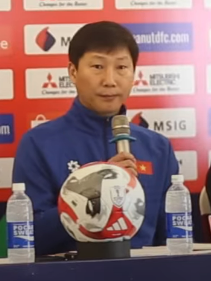
Kim Sang-sik, the current head coach of under 23 Vietnam.

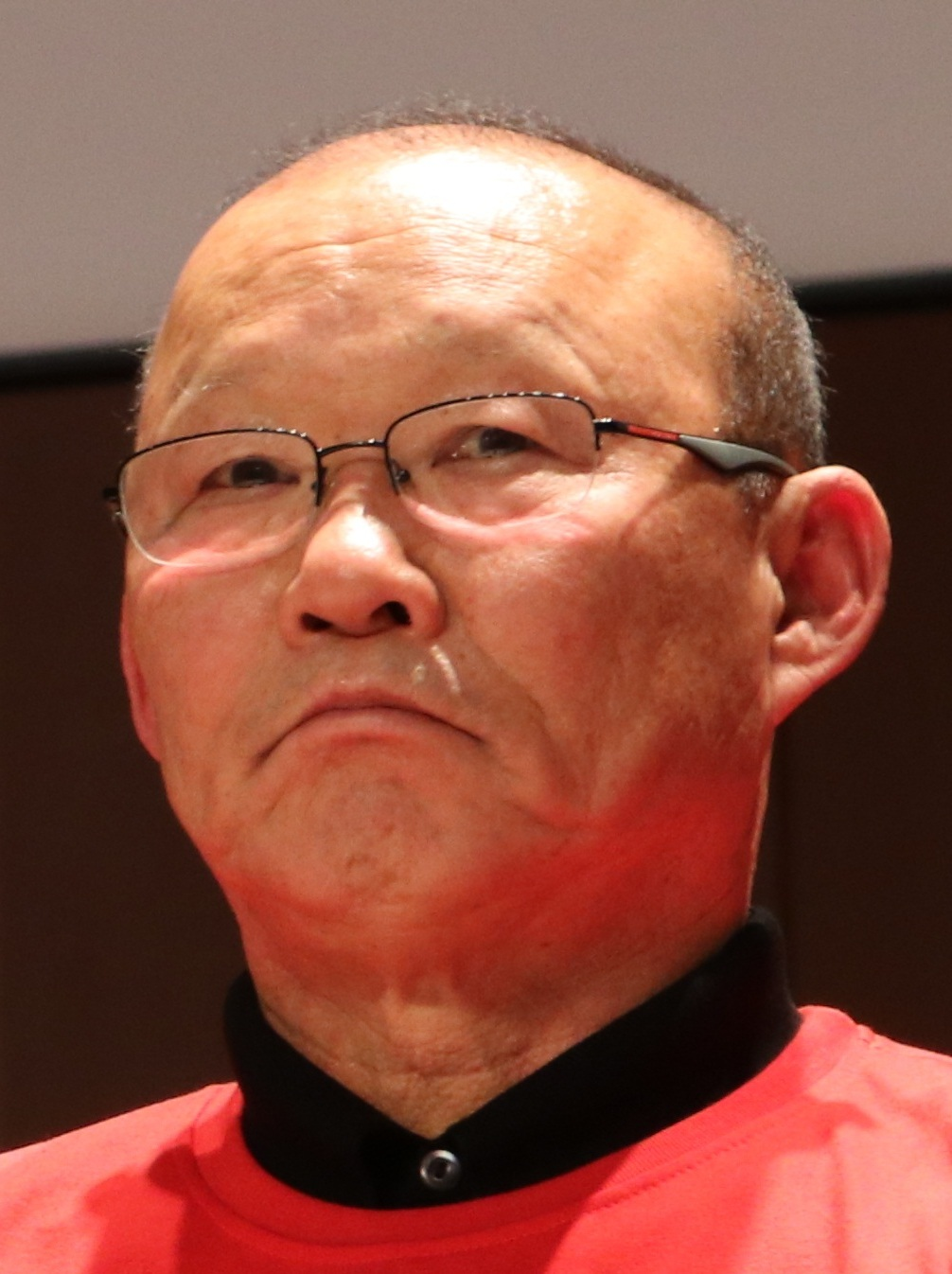
Park Hang-seo, considered the best coach in the history of under 23 Vietnamese football.

Position	Name
Head coach	(South Korea) Kim Sang-sik
Assistant coach	(South Korea) Nam Gung-do
Assistant coach	(Vietnam) Đinh Hồng Vinh
Assistant coach	(Vietnam) Trịnh Duy Quang
Goalkeeper coach	(Vietnam) Trần Minh Quang
Fitness coach	(South Korea) Yoon Dong-hun
Fitness coach	(Vietnam) Nguyễn Tăng Tuấn
Kit manager	Đinh Kim Tuấn
Doctor	(Vietnam) Lê Xuân An
Doctor	(Vietnam) Trần Anh Tuấn
Doctor	(Vietnam) Vũ Anh Dũng
Match analyst	Nguyễn Anh Dũng
Interpreter	(Vietnam) Đỗ Anh Văn
Team manager	Nguyễn Quốc Hội

=== Coaching history ===
Coaches by years since 1999

As of 14 November 2026

List of Vietnamese national under-23 football team managers
Image	Name	Nationality	From	To	Pld	W	D	L	GF	GA	Win% (Note: Win% is rounded to two decimal places)	Achievements
	Quản Trọng Hùng	Vietnam	March 1999	June 1999	9	0	3	6	4	16	0.00	
	Rainer Willfeld (caretaker)	Germany	June 2000	October 2000	3	0	1	2	4	8	0.00	
	Dido	Brazil	1 January 2001	25 September 2001	3	1	0	2	5	4	33.33	
	Christian Letard	France	22 March 2002	22 August 2002	2	0	0	2	2	5	0.00	
	Nguyễn Thành Vinh	Vietnam	22 August 2002	31 December 2002	4	0	2	2	1	6	0.00	
	Alfred Riedl	Austria	January 2003	12 December 2007	45	22	6	17	70	61	48.89	(silver) 2003 SEA Games; (gold) 2005 Ho Chi Minh City Cup; (gold) 2005 VFF Cup; (silver) 2005 SEA Games; (gold) Capital SHBank Cup
	Mai Đức Chung	Vietnam	12 December 2007	31 December 2008	7	2	3	2	11	13	28.57	(gold) 2008 Merdeka Tournament
	Henrique Calisto	Portugal	5 March 2009	1 March 2011	9	6	2	1	22	6	66.67	(gold) 2009 VFF Cup; (silver) 2009 SEA Games
	Phan Thanh Hùng (caretaker)	Vietnam	September 2010	23 June 2011	12	6	1	5	18	18	50.00	(gold) Millennial Anniversary of Hanoi Tournament
	Falko Götz	Germany	1 June 2011	6 January 2012	11	6	3	2	26	11	54.55	
	Lư Đình Tuấn	Vietnam	June 2012	3 July 2012	7	3	0	4	18	11	42.86	
	Hoàng Văn Phúc	Vietnam	November 2012	4 April 2014	8	4	0	4	18	7	50.00	
	Toshiya Miura	Japan	8 May 2014	28 January 2016	23	11	2	10	48	30	47.83	(bronze) 2015 SEA Games
	Nguyễn Hữu Thắng	Vietnam	3 March 2016	27 August 2017	13	6	3	4	30	16	46.15	
	Park Hang-seo	South Korea	11 October 2017	22 May 2022	49	32	11	6	98	30	65.31	(silver) 2018 AFC U-23 Championship; (gold) 2018 VFF Cup; 2018 Asian Games: 4th place (gold) 2019 SEA Games; (gold) 2021 SEA Games
	Nguyễn Quốc Tuấn (caretaker)	Vietnam	17 January 2019	26 February 2019	5	3	1	1	7	2	60.00	(bronze) 2019 AFF U-22 Youth Championship
	Kim Han-Yoon (caretaker)	South Korea	May 2019	June 2019	1	1	0	0	2	0	100.00	
	Lee Young-jin (caretaker)	South Korea	1 March 2022	30 March 2022	3	0	1	2	0	2	0.00	
	Đinh Thế Nam (caretaker)	Vietnam	December 2021	26 February 2022	4	3	1	0	9	0	75.00	(gold) 2022 AFF U-23 Championship
	Gong Oh-kyun	South Korea	23 May 2022	12 December 2022	5	1	2	2	5	8	20.00	
	Philippe Troussier	France	1 March 2023	26 March 2024	12	6	3	3	22	16	50.00	(bronze) 2023 SEA Games
	Hoàng Anh Tuấn (caretaker)	Vietnam	July 2023	24 September 2023	8	4	2	2	15	12	50.00	(gold) 2023 AFF U-23 Championship
	Moulay Azzeggouarh (caretaker)	Morocco	13 March 2024	23 March 2024	2	1	1	0	1	0	50.00	
	Hoàng Anh Tuấn (caretaker)	Vietnam	28 March 2024	28 April 2024	5	2	1	2	5	5	40.00	
	Kim Sang-sik	South Korea	3 May 2024	Present	23	17	4	2	41	17	73.91	(gold) 2025 ASEAN U-23 Championship; (gold) 2025 SEA Games; (bronze) 2026 AFC U-23 Asian Cup
	Đinh Hồng Vinh (caretaker)	Vietnam	30 August 2024	Present	21	5	6	10	17	24	23.81	(gold) 2026 Gia Lai U-23 VTV Cup

== Honours ==
Continental

- AFC U-23 Asian Cup:

(silver) Runners-up (1): 2018
(bronze) Third place (1): 2026

- Asian Games:

Fourth place (1): 2018

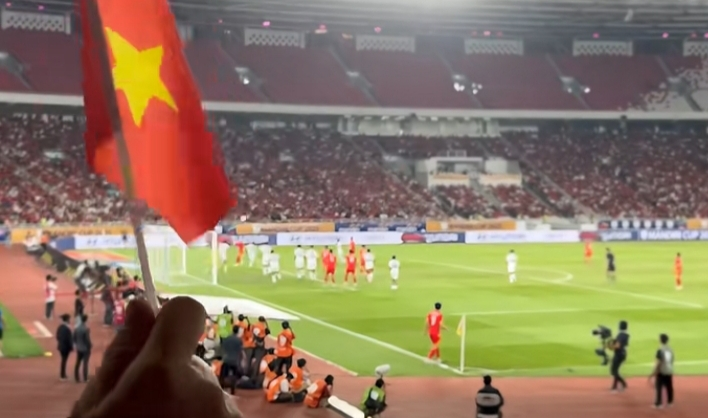
The 2025 AFF U-23 final between U-23 Vietnam and U-23 Indonesia, Vietnam won 1-0 which led to three successive titles.

Regional

- AFF U-23 Championship

Winners (3): 2022, 2023, 2025
(bronze) Third place (1): 2019

- SEA Games

Gold medal (3): 2019, 2021, 2025
Silver medal (3): 2003, 2005, 2009
Bronze medal (2): 2015, 2023

Friendly tournaments

- VFF Cup

Champions (3): 2005, 2009, 2018

- Merdeka Cup

Champions (1): 2008

- Ho Chi Minh City Cup

Champions (1): 2005

- Capital SHBank Cup

Champions (1): 2005

- Millennial Anniversary of Hanoi Cup

Champions (1): 2010

- Gia Lai U-23 VTV Cup

Champions (1): 2026

== Competitive records ==
=== Olympic Games ===
- Since 1992, football at the Summer Olympics changed into an Under-23 tournament.

Summer Olympics record									Qualification record							
Year	Result	Pos.	Pld	W	D	L	GF	GA	Outcome	Pld	W	D	L	GF	GA	—
Before 1992	See Vietnam national football team								See Vietnam national football team							
(Spain) 1992	Did not enter								Did not enter							
(United States) 1996	Did not enter								Did not enter							
2000	Did not qualify								Round 1	6	0	2	4	3	12	2000
2004	Did not qualify								Preliminary round 1	2	0	1	1	2	4	2004
2008	Did not qualify								Preliminary round 3	13	5	2	6	13	17	2008
2012	Did not qualify								Preliminary round 2	2	0	0	2	1	6	2012
2016	Did not qualify								via AFC U-23 Asian Cup							
2020	Did not qualify								via AFC U-23 Asian Cup							
2024	Did not qualify								via AFC U-23 Asian Cup							
2028	To be determined								via AFC U-23 Asian Cup							
2032	To be determined								via AFC U-23 Asian Cup							
2036	To be determined								via AFC U-23 Asian Cup							
2040	To be determined								via AFC U-23 Asian Cup							
Total		0/7							Round 3	26	5	5	16	23	48	—

=== AFC U-23 Asian Cup ===
AFC U-23 Asian Cup record									Qualification record							
Year	Result	Pos.	Pld	W	D	L	GF	GA	Outcome	Pld	W	D	L	GF	GA	—
2013	Did not qualify								5th of 6	5	1	0	4	11	10	2013
2016	Group stage	15th	3	0	0	3	3	8	2nd of 4^{BRU}	3	2	0	1	9	3	2016
2018	Runners-up	2nd	6	1	3	2	8	9	2nd of 4^{BRU}	3	2	0	1	13	3	2018
2020	Group stage	13th	3	0	2	1	1	2	1st of 4	3	3	0	0	11	0	2020
2022	Quarter-finals	7th	4	1	2	1	5	5	1st of 3	2	2	0	0	2	0	2022
2024	Quarter-finals	6th	4	2	0	2	5	5	1st of 4	3	2	1	0	9	2	2024
2026	Third place	3rd	6	4	1	1	10	8	1st of 4	3	3	0	0	4	0	2026
2028	To be determined								To be determined							2028
Total	Runners-up	6/7	26	8	8	10	32	37	1st place	22	15	1	6	59	18	—

Notes

- ^{BRU} Qualified as best runners-up

AFC U-23 Asian Cup History
Season	Round	Opponent	Scores	Result	Venue
2016	Group stage	Jordan	1–3	Loss	Doha, Qatar
2016	Group stage	Australia	0–2	Loss	Doha, Qatar
2016	Group stage	United Arab Emirates	2–3	Loss	Doha, Qatar
2018	Group stage	South Korea	1–2	Loss	Kunshan, China
2018	Group stage	Australia	1–0	Won	Kunshan, China
2018	Group stage	Syria	0–0	Draw	Changshu, China
2018	Quarter-finals	Iraq	3–3 a.e.t (pens. 5–3)	Won	Changshu, China
2018	Semi-finals	Qatar	2–2 a.e.t (pens. 4–3)	Won	Changzhou, China
2018	Final	Uzbekistan	1–2 a.e.t	Loss	Changzhou, China
2020	Group stage	United Arab Emirates	0–0	Draw	Buriram, Thailand
2020	Group stage	Jordan	0–0	Draw	Buriram, Thailand
2020	Group stage	North Korea	1–2	Loss	Bangkok, Thailand
2022	Group stage	Thailand	2–2	Draw	Tashkent, Uzbekistan
2022	Group stage	South Korea	1–1	Draw	Tashkent, Uzbekistan
2022	Group stage	Malaysia	2–0	Won	Tashkent, Uzbekistan
2022	Quarter-finals	Saudi Arabia	0–2	Loss	Tashkent, Uzbekistan
2024	Group stage	Kuwait	3–1	Won	Al Wakrah, Qatar
2024	Group stage	Malaysia	2–0	Won	Al Rayyan, Qatar
2024	Group stage	Uzbekistan	0–3	Loss	Al Rayyan, Qatar
2024	Quarter-finals	Iraq	0–1	Loss	Al Wakrah, Qatar
2026	Group stage	Jordan	2–0	Won	Jeddah, Saudi Arabia
2026	Group stage	Kyrgyzstan	2–1	Won	Jeddah, Saudi Arabia
2026	Group stage	Saudi Arabia	1–0	Won	Jeddah, Saudi Arabia
2026	Quarter-finals	United Arab Emirates	3–2 a.e.t	Won	Jeddah, Saudi Arabia
2026	Semi-finals	China	0–3	Loss	Jeddah, Saudi Arabia
2026	Third-place match	South Korea	2–2 a.e.t (pens. 7–6)	Won	Jeddah, Saudi Arabia

=== Asian Games ===
- Since 2002, football at the Asian Games changed into an Under-23 tournament.

Asian Games record
Year	Result	Pos.	Pld	W	D	L	GF	GA
Before 1998	See Vietnam national football team							
2002	Group stage	19th	3	0	1	2	0	5
2006	Group stage	15th	3	1	0	2	6	5
2010	Round of 16	14th	4	1	0	3	5	10
2014	Round of 16	12th	3	2	0	1	6	4
2018	Fourth place	4th	7	5	1	1	10	4
2022	Group stage	17th	3	1	0	2	5	9
2026	Quarter-finals	7th	4	1	1	2	3	7
2030	To be determined							
2034	To be determined							
Total	Fourth place	6/9	27	11	3	13	35	44

Asian Games History
Season	Round	Opponent	Scores	Result	Venue
2002	Group stage	United Arab Emirates	0–0	Draw	Ulsan, South Korea
2002	Group stage	Thailand	0–3	Loss	Changwon, South Korea
2002	Group stage	Yemen	0–2	Loss	Changwon, South Korea
2006	Group stage	Bahrain	1–2	Loss	Al Rayyan, Qatar
2006	Group stage	South Korea	0–2	Loss	Doha, Qatar
2006	Group stage	Bangladesh	5–1	Won	Doha, Qatar
2010	Group stage	Bahrain	3–1	Won	Guangzhou, China
2010	Group stage	Turkmenistan	2–6	Loss	Guangzhou, China
2010	Group stage	Iran	0–1	Loss	Guangzhou, China
2010	Round of 16	North Korea	0–2	Loss	Guangzhou, China
2014	Group stage	Iran	4–1	Won	Ansan, South Korea
2014	Group stage	Kyrgyzstan	1–0	Won	Ansan, South Korea
2014	Round of 16	United Arab Emirates	1–3	Loss	Hwaseong, Gyeonggi, South Korea
2018	Group stage	Pakistan	3–0	Won	Cikarang, Indonesia
2018	Group stage	Nepal	2–0	Won	Cikarang, Indonesia
2018	Group stage	Japan	1–0	Won	Cikarang, Indonesia
2018	Round of 16	Bahrain	1–0	Won	Bekasi, Indonesia
2018	Quarter-finals	Syria	1–0 a.e.t	Won	Bekasi, Indonesia
2018	Semi-finals	South Korea	1–3	Loss	Cibinong, Indonesia
2018	Bronze medal match	United Arab Emirates	1–1 (pens. 3–4)	Loss	Cibinong, Indonesia
2022	Group stage	Mongolia	4–2	Won	Hangzhou, China
2022	Group stage	Iran	0–4	Loss	Hangzhou, China
2022	Group stage	Saudi Arabia	1–3	Loss	Hangzhou, China
2026	Group stage	Kuwait	1–1	Draw	Nagoya, Japan
2026	Group stage	Philippines	2–0	Won	Nagoya, Japan
2026	Group stage	Uzbekistan	0–2	Loss	Nagoya, Japan
2026	Quarter-finals	South Korea	0–4	Loss	Nagoya, Japan

=== SEA Games ===
- Since 2001, the men's football event at the SEA Games changed into an under-23 tournament.

Southeast Asian Games record
Year	Result	Pos.	Pld	W	D	L	GF	GA
Before 1999	See Vietnam national football team							
2001	Group stage	6th	3	1	0	2	5	4
2003	Silver medal	2nd	5	3	1	1	8	6
2005	Silver medal	2nd	6	4	0	2	13	8
2007	Fourth place	4th	5	2	1	2	7	10
2009	Silver medal	2nd	6	4	1	1	18	5
2011	Fourth place	4th	7	4	1	2	17	8
2013	Group stage	6th	4	2	0	2	13	3
2015	Bronze medal	3rd	7	5	0	2	23	6
2017	Group stage	5th	5	3	1	1	12	4
2019	Gold medal	1st	7	6	1	0	24	4
2021	Gold medal	1st	6	5	1	0	8	0
2023	Bronze medal	3rd	6	4	1	1	13	7
2025	Gold medal	1st	4	4	0	0	9	3
2027	To be determined							
2029	To be determined							
2031	To be determined							
2033	To be determined							
Total	3 Gold medals	13/17	71	47	8	16	170	68

SEA Games History
Season	Round	Opponent	Scores	Result	Venue
2001	Group stage	Brunei	5–1	Won	Petaling Jaya, Malaysia
2001	Group stage	Indonesia	0–1	Loss	Petaling Jaya, Malaysia
2001	Group stage	Malaysia	2–0	Loss	Kuala Lumpur, Malaysia
2003	Group stage	Thailand	1–1	Draw	Hanoi, Vietnam
2003	Group stage	Indonesia	1–0	Won	Hanoi, Vietnam
2003	Group stage	Laos	1–0	Won	Hanoi, Vietnam
2003	Semi-finals	Malaysia	4–3	Won	Hanoi, Vietnam
2003	Final	Thailand	1–2 (a.e.t)	Loss	Hanoi, Vietnam
2005	Group stage	Singapore	2–1	Won	Bacolod, Philippines
2005	Group stage	Laos	8–2	Won	Bacolod, Philippines
2005	Group stage	Myanmar	1–0	Won	Bacolod, Philippines
2005	Group stage	Indonesia	0–1	Loss	Bacolod, Philippines
2005	Semi-finals	Malaysia	2–1	Won	Bacolod, Philippines
2005	Final	Thailand	0–3	Loss	Bacolod, Philippines
2007	Group stage	Malaysia	3–1	Won	Nakhon Ratchasima, Thailand
2007	Group stage	Singapore	2–3	Loss	Nakhon Ratchasima, Thailand
2007	Group stage	Laos	2–1	Won	Nakhon Ratchasima, Thailand
2007	Semi-finals	Myanmar	0–0 (a.e.t) (pens. 1–3)	Loss	Nakhon Ratchasima, Thailand
2007	Bronze medal match	Singapore	0–5	Loss	Nakhon Ratchasima, Thailand
2009	Group stage	Thailand	1–1	Draw	Vientiane, Laos
2009	Group stage	Timor-Leste	4–0	Won	Vientiane, Laos
2009	Group stage	Malaysia	3–1	Won	Vientiane, Laos
2009	Group stage	Cambodia	6–1	Won	Vientiane, Laos
2009	Semi-finals	Singapore	4–1	Won	Vientiane, Laos
2009	Final	Malaysia	0–1	Loss	Vientiane, Laos
2011	Group stage	Philippines	3–1	Won	Jakarta, Indonesia
2011	Group stage	Myanmar	0–0	Draw	Jakarta, Indonesia
2011	Group stage	Timor-Leste	2–0	Won	Jakarta, Indonesia
2011	Group stage	Brunei	8–0	Won	Jakarta, Indonesia
2011	Group stage	Laos	3–1	Won	Jakarta, Indonesia
2011	Semi-finals	Indonesia	0–2	Loss	Jakarta, Indonesia
2011	Bronze medal match	Myanmar	1–4	Loss	Jakarta, Indonesia
2013	Group stage	Brunei	7–0	Won	Naypyidaw, Myanmar
2013	Group stage	Singapore	0–1	Loss	Naypyidaw, Myanmar
2013	Group stage	Laos	5–0	Won	Naypyidaw, Myanmar
2013	Group stage	Malaysia	1–2	Loss	Naypyidaw, Myanmar
2015	Group stage	Brunei	6–0	Won	Bishan, Singapore
2015	Group stage	Malaysia	5–1	Won	Bishan, Singapore
2015	Group stage	Laos	1–0	Won	Bishan, Singapore
2015	Group stage	Timor-Leste	4–0	Won	Bishan, Singapore
2015	Group stage	Thailand	1–3	Loss	Bishan, Singapore
2015	Semi-finals	Myanmar	1–2	Loss	Kallang, Singapore
2015	Bronze medal match	Indonesia	5–0	Won	Kallang, Singapore
2017	Group stage	Timor-Leste	4–0	Won	Selayang, Malaysia
2017	Group stage	Cambodia	4–1	Won	Shah Alam, Malaysia
2017	Group stage	Philippines	4–0	Won	Shah Alam, Malaysia
2017	Group stage	Indonesia	0–0	Draw	Selayang, Malaysia
2017	Group stage	Thailand	0–3	Loss	Selayang, Malaysia
2019	Group stage	Brunei	6–0	Won	Biñan, Philippines
2019	Group stage	Laos	6–1	Won	Biñan, Philippines
2019	Group stage	Indonesia	2–1	Won	Manila, Philippines
2019	Group stage	Singapore	1–0	Won	Manila, Philippines
2019	Group stage	Thailand	2–2	Draw	Biñan, Philippines
2019	Semi-finals	Cambodia	4–0	Won	Manila, Philippines
2019	Gold medal match	Indonesia	3–0	Won	Manila, Philippines
2021	Group stage	Indonesia	3–0	Won	Phú Thọ, Vietnam
2021	Group stage	Philippines	0–0	Draw	Phú Thọ, Vietnam
2021	Group stage	Myanmar	1–0	Won	Phú Thọ, Vietnam
2021	Group stage	Timor-Leste	2–0	Won	Phú Thọ, Vietnam
2021	Semi-finals	Malaysia	1–0	Won	Phú Thọ, Vietnam
2021	Gold medal match	Thailand	1–0	Won	Hanoi, Vietnam
2023	Group stage	Laos	2–0	Won	Phnom Penh, Cambodia
2023	Group stage	Singapore	3–1	Won	Phnom Penh, Cambodia
2023	Group stage	Malaysia	2–1	Won	Phnom Penh, Cambodia
2023	Group stage	Thailand	1–1	Draw	Phnom Penh, Cambodia
2023	Semi-finals	Indonesia	2–3	Loss	Phnom Penh, Cambodia
2023	Bronze medal match	Myanmar	3–1	Won	Phnom Penh, Cambodia
2025	Group stage	Laos	2–1	Won	Bangkok, Thailand
2025	Group stage	Malaysia	2–0	Won	Bangkok, Thailand
2025	Semi-finals	Philippines	2–0	Won	Bangkok, Thailand
2025	Gold Medal Match	Thailand	3–2 (a.e.t)	Won	Bangkok, Thailand

=== ASEAN U-23 Championship ===
ASEAN U-23 Championship record
Year	Result	Pos.	Pld	W	D	L	GF	GA
2005	Did not enter							
2019	Third place	3rd	5	3	1	1	7	2
2022	Champions	1st	4	3	1	0	9	0
2023	Champions	1st	4	3	1	0	9	2
(Indonesia) 2025	Champions	1st	4	4	0	0	8	2
(Vietnam) 2027	To be determined							
Total	3 Titles	5/6	17	13	3	1	33	6

ASEAN U-23 Championship History
Season	Round	Opponent	Scores	Result	Venue
2019	Group stage	Philippines	2–1	Won	Phnom Penh, Cambodia
2019	Group stage	Timor-Leste	4–0	Won	Phnom Penh, Cambodia
2019	Group stage	Thailand	0–0	Draw	Phnom Penh, Cambodia
2019	Semi-finals	Indonesia	0–1	Loss	Phnom Penh, Cambodia
2019	Third place play-off	Cambodia	1–0	Won	Phnom Penh, Cambodia
2022	Group stage	Singapore	7–0	Won	Phnom Penh, Cambodia
2022	Group stage	Thailand	1–0	Won	Phnom Penh, Cambodia
2022	Semi-finals	Timor-Leste	0–0 (a.e.t.) (pens. 5–3)	Draw	Phnom Penh, Cambodia
2022	Final	Thailand	1–0	Won	Phnom Penh, Cambodia
2023	Group stage	Laos	4–1	Won	Rayong, Thailand
2023	Group stage	Philippines	1–0	Won	Rayong, Thailand
2023	Semi-finals	Malaysia	4–1	Won	Rayong, Thailand
2023	Final	Indonesia	0–0 (a.e.t.) (pens. 6–5)	Draw	Rayong, Thailand
2025	Group stage	Laos	3–0	Won	Bekasi, Indonesia
2025	Group stage	Cambodia	2–1	Won	Jakarta, Indonesia
2025	Semi-finals	Philippines	2–1	Won	Jakarta, Indonesia
2025	Final	Indonesia	1–0	Won	Jakarta, Indonesia

== Head-to-head record ==
An all-time record table of Vietnam national under-23 football team in major competitions only including; Summer Olympics, AFC U-23 Asian Cup, Asian Games, Southeast Asian Games, ASEAN U-23 Championship and some other official friendly matches.

Positive Record Neutral Record Negative Record

Vietnam national under-23 football team all-time record
Opponent	Pld	W	D	L	GF	GA	GD
Afghanistan	1	1	0	0	2	0	+2
Australia	2	1	0	1	1	2	−1
Argentina	1	0	0	1	0	5	−5
Bahrain	6	2	2	2	8	7	+1
Bangladesh	3	3	0	0	11	3	+8
Brunei	6	6	0	0	38	1	+37
Cambodia	5	5	0	0	16	3	+13
China	8	3	1	4	7	13	−6
Cameroon	1	0	0	1	1	4	−3
Croatia	1	0	0	1	0	1	−1
Chinese Taipei	5	4	0	1	14	3	+4
Finland	1	0	0	1	1	2	−1
Guam	1	1	0	0	6	0	+6
India	1	1	0	0	3	1	+2
Indonesia	17	9	2	5	21	9	+13
Iran	4	2	0	2	6	6	0
Iraq	5	0	3	2	5	10	−5
Japan	5	1	0	4	1	9	−8
Jordan	3	1	1	1	3	3	0
Kyrgyzstan	5	4	1	0	6	1	+5
Kuwait	2	1	1	0	4	2	+2
Laos	11	11	0	0	37	7	+30
Lebanon	2	1	0	1	2	1	+1
Macau	2	2	0	0	15	1	+14
Malaysia	21	14	3	4	30	14	+16
Mexico	1	0	1	0	0	0	0
Mongolia	1	1	0	0	4	2	+2
Myanmar	13	7	2	4	20	12	+8
Nepal	1	1	0	0	2	0	+2
North Korea	5	0	2	3	4	7	−3
Oman	3	2	0	1	4	3	+1
Pakistan	1	1	0	0	3	0	+3
Palestine	1	1	0	0	2	1	+1
Philippines	9	8	1	0	29	3	+26
Qatar	5	0	2	3	6	10	−4
South Korea	9	0	3	6	6	15	−9
Saudi Arabia	7	1	1	5	4	14	−10
Singapore	11	7	1	3	23	14	+9
Syria	3	1	1	1	2	2	0
Tajikistan	3	2	1	0	2	1	+1
Thailand	22	9	6	7	28	30	−2
Timor-Leste	8	7	1	0	24	0	+24
Turkmenistan	1	0	0	1	2	6	−4
United Arab Emirates	9	1	4	4	8	14	−6
Uzbekistan	8	0	2	6	4	13	−9
Yemen	3	2	0	1	3	2	+1
Zimbabwe	1	1	0	0	2	0	+2
	233	121	36	71	389	239	
Last match updated was against Thailand on 10 November 2026

== See also ==
- Vietnam national football team
- Vietnam national under-20 football team
- Vietnam national under-17 football team
