= Lê Nguyên Hoàng =

Vietnamese footballer (born 2005)

Personal information
- Full name: Lê Nguyên Hoàng
- Date of birth: 14 February 2005 (age 21)
- Place of birth: Cửa Lò, Nghệ An, Vietnam
- Height: 1.78 m (5 ft 10 in)
- Position: Centre-back

Team information
- Current team: Sông Lam Nghệ An
- Number: 3

Youth career
- 2014–2023: Sông Lam Nghệ An

Senior career*
Years	Team	Apps	(Gls)
2023–	Sông Lam Nghệ An	37	(1)

International career^{‡}
2022–2023	Vietnam U17	2	(0)
2023–2024	Vietnam U20	4	(0)
2023–	Vietnam U23	22	(0)
- * Club domestic league appearances and goals as of 20 November 2026 ‡ National team caps and goals as of 14 November 2026

Lê Nguyên Hoàng (born 14 February 2005) is a Vietnamese professional footballer who plays as a centre-back for V.League 1 club Sông Lam Nghệ An and the Vietnam national under-23 team.

== Early career ==
Nguyên Hoàng started playing football at an early age for his local team in Cửa Lò. In 2014, Song Lam Nghe An scouts spotted Nguyên Hoàng in a youth football tournament in Nghệ An and decided to recruit him to the team youth academy. In 2023, he captained the under-19 side of Sông Lam Nghệ An to finish as runners-up in the Vietnamese National U-19 Football Championship as they were defeated by Thanh Hóa U19 in the final. His solid defending during the tournament gained him a spot in the "Best XI".

== Club career ==
Nguyên Hoàng was promoted to Sông Lam Nghệ An's first team for the 2023–24 V.League 1 season. He made his professional debut on 28 October 2023, replacing the injured Hồ Khắc Lương on the 34th minute of a 2–2 V.League 1 draw against their Nghệ-Tĩnh Derby rival Hồng Lĩnh Hà Tĩnh.

== International career ==
In March 2022, Nguyên Hoàng was chosen alongside 18 other Vietnam U17 players for a training camp in Germany.

In February 2023, Nguyên Hoàng took part in Vietnam U20 squad in the 2023 AFC U-20 Championship as one of the three starter center backs. He displayed good defending skills a good despite his country failed to pass through the group stage. Against Australia and Qatar made blocked several shots from the opponent and won in most of the aerial duels despite having an average height (1.77m).

A few months after, he was named in Vietnam U23 squad for the 2023 AFF U-23 Championship. He appeared in all four games as Vietnam ended up winning the tournament.

== Honours ==
Vietnam U23

- AFF U-23 Championship: 2023
- Gia Lai U-23 VTV Cup: 2026
