= Lê Văn Thuận =

Vietnamese footballer (born 2006)

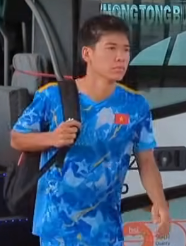
- Văn Thuận in 2025

Personal information
- Full name: Lê Văn Thuận
- Date of birth: 15 July 2006 (age 20)
- Place of birth: Thanh Hóa, Vietnam
- Height: 1.76 m (5 ft 9 in)
- Position: Winger

Team information
- Current team: Ninh Bình
- Number: 11

Youth career
- 2022–2024: Thanh Hóa

Senior career*
Years	Team	Apps	(Gls)
2024–2026	Đông Á Thanh Hóa	25	(3)
2026–	Ninh Bình	17	(3)

International career^{‡}
2022–2023	Vietnam U17	4	(0)
2025–	Vietnam U23	28	(3)
Medal record
Men's football
Representing Vietnam
AFC U-23 Asian Cup
Third place	Saudi Arabia 2026
ASEAN U-23 Championship
Winner	Indonesia 2025
- * Club domestic league appearances and goals as of 11 October 2026 ‡ National team caps and goals as of 14 November 2026

Lê Văn Thuận (born 15 July 2006) is a Vietnamese professional footballer who plays as a winger for V.League 1 club Ninh Bình.

== Club career ==
A product of the Thanh Hóa youth academy, Văn Thuận was promoted to the first team ahead of the 2024–25 season, following his good performances at the Vietnamese U-21 Championship. He started the season as a substitute player, but then became a regular starter following the arrival of coach Tomislav Steinbrückner. After an impressive debut season for Đông Á Thanh Hóa with 2 goals and 4 assists, Văn Thuận was selected as the V.League 1 Young Player of the Season.

On 13 January 2025, Văn Thuận was transferred to V.League 1 fellow Ninh Bình.

== International career ==
In May 2022, Văn Thuận was named in Vietnam U16 squad to participate in the AFF U-16 Youth Championship. He appeared in 4 games during the tournament, including the final, as Vietnam finished as runners-up.

In June 2025, at the age of 18, Văn Thuận received his first call up with Vietnam U23's side. In the unofficial friendly game against the Vietnam national team, scored the only goal for Vietnam U23 in the 1–2 defeat.

== Career statistics ==
=== Club ===
As of match played 11 October 2026

Appearances and goals by club, season and competition
Club	Season	League			Cup		Other		Total	
Club	Season	Division	Apps	Goals	Apps	Goals	Apps	Goals	Apps	Goals
Đông Á Thanh Hóa	2024–25	V.League 1	15	2	1	0	2 (Note: Appearances in ASEAN Club Championship)	0	18	2
Đông Á Thanh Hóa	2025–26	V.League 1	10	1	1	0	—		11	1
Đông Á Thanh Hóa	Total		25	3	2	0	2	0	29	3
Ninh Bình	2025–26	V.League 1	14	3	3	0	—		17	3
Ninh Bình	2026–27	V.League 1	2	0	0	0	—		2	0
Ninh Bình	Total		16	3	3	0	2	0	19	3
Career total			41	6	5	0	2	0	48	6

== Honours ==
Vietnam U16

- AFF U-16 Youth Championship runner-up: 2022

Vietnam U23

- ASEAN U-23 Championship: 2025
- SEA Games gold medal: 2025
- AFC U-23 Asian Cup third place: 2026
- Gia Lai U-23 VTV Cup: 2026

Individual

- V.League 1 Young Player of the Season: 2024–25
