= Ilídio Vale =

Portuguese football manager

Personal information
- Full name: Ilídio Fernando Torres do Vale
- Date of birth: 13 December 1957 (age 68)
- Place of birth: Maia, Portugal

Team information
- Current team: Qatar U-23

Managerial career
- Years: Team
- 1986–1987: Nogueirense (juniors)
- 1986–1987: Nogueirense
- 1989–2007: Porto (juniors)
- 1999–2000: Porto (assistant)
- 2000–2004: Porto B
- 2009–2010: Portugal U19
- 2010–2011: Portugal U15
- 2010–2014: Portugal U20
- 2011: Portugal U23
- 2014–2022: Portugal (assistant)
- 2023–: Qatar U23
Medal record
Men's football
Representing Portugal (as manager)
FIFA U-20 World Cup
Runner-up	2011

Ilídio Fernando Torres do Vale (born 13 December 1957), known as Ilídio Vale, is a Portuguese football manager, currently serving as a coach of the Qatar national under-23 football team.

== Early life ==
Vale was born in Maia. During his youth, Vale is a graduate of the University of Porto where he majored in Physical Education and Sports.

== Coaching career ==
After starting as a manager with both Nogueirense junior and main team, Vale moved in 1989 to FC Porto, spending eighteen years in charge of its junior side.

In 1994, Vale was appointed Technical Coordinator around the youth football of FC Porto, being responsible for the development and operation of the project.

In the 1999-2000 season, Vale was appointed as assistant coach of the main squad. He also managed FC Porto B, the reserve team of Porto, between 2000 and 2004.

He left Porto in 2006 after winning 27 titles with the juniors squads.

Vale is in the Portuguese Football Federation since 2006.

On 8 May 2010, Vale qualified the Under-19s for the 2010 UEFA European Under-19 Championship in France.

On 23 March 2011, Ilídio Vale reached the 2009–11 International Challenge Trophy Final after Portugal U23 beat the Italy Lega Pro U21 3–2, overcoming a 0-2 defeat in the half-time.

He coached the Portugal under-20 side to the 2011 FIFA U-20 World Cup final.

Following Fernando Santos's appointment as head coach of the Portugal national team, Vale joined Santos's coaching team as an assistant coach.

== Honours ==
=== Assistant coach ===
Porto

- Supertaça Cândido de Oliveira: 1999
- Taça de Portugal: 1999–2000

Portugal

- UEFA European Championship: 2016

=== Head coach ===
Portugal U19

- La Manga Tournament: 2010

Portugal U20

- FIFA U-20 World Cup: Runner-up 2011

Portugal U23

- International Challenge Trophy: 2009–11

== Managerial statistics ==
Team	Nat	From	To	Record							
Team	Nat	From	To	G	W	D	L	Win %	GF	GA	+/−
Portugal U20	(Portugal)	2010	2012	24	9	12	3	37.5	27	20	+7
Portugal U23	(Portugal)	23 March 2011	19 May 2011	2	2	0	0	100	4	2	+2
Total											

Awards
Preceded by Tomaz Morais	Portugal Coach of the Year; 2011	Succeeded by Ryszard Hoppe
