= Nguyễn Bảo Long =

Vietnamese footballer (born 2005)

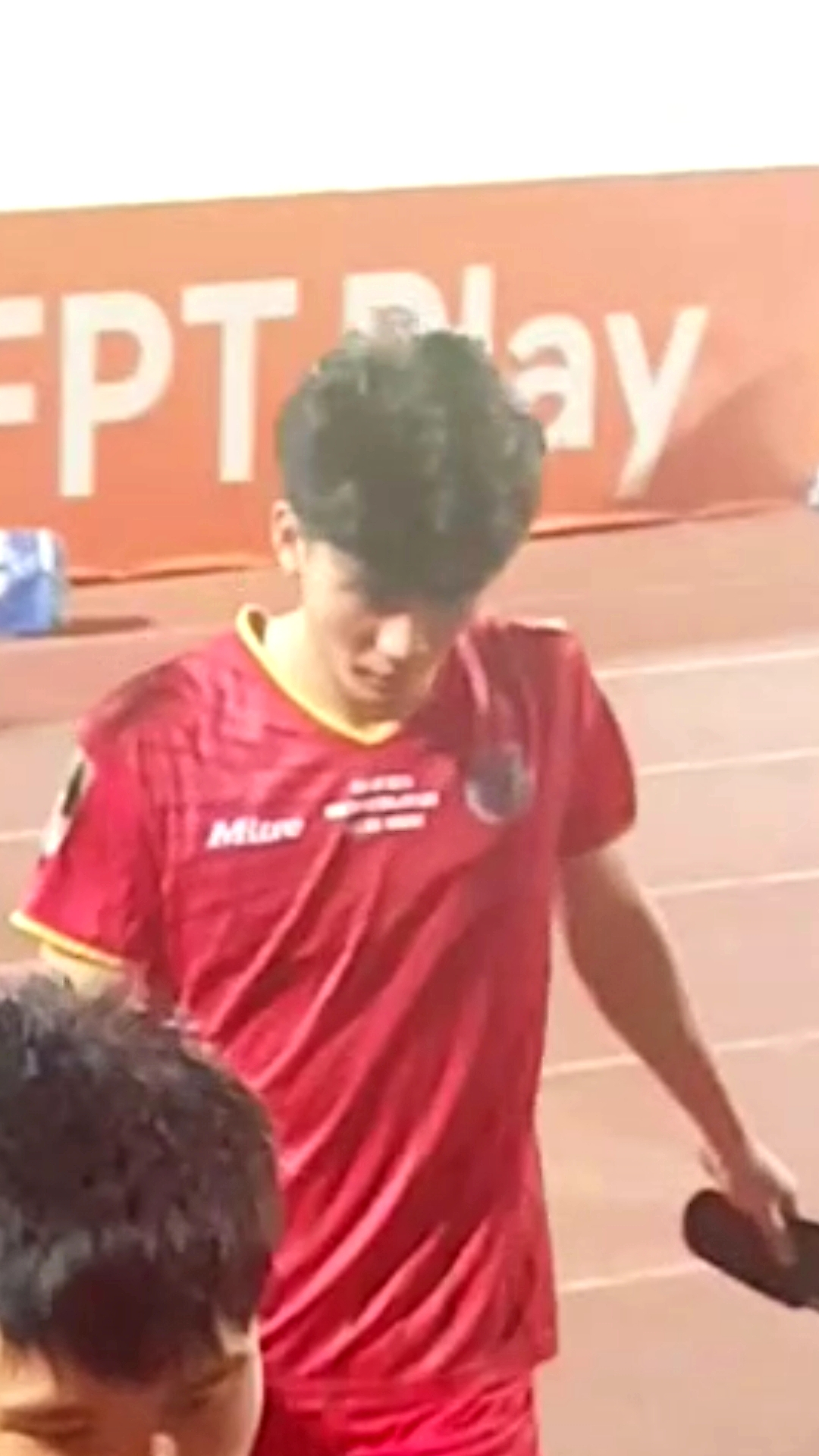
- Bảo Long in 2024

Personal information
- Full name: Nguyễn Bảo Long
- Date of birth: 23 August 2005 (age 21)
- Place of birth: Việt Yên, Bắc Giang, Vietnam
- Height: 1.76 m (5 ft 9 in)
- Position: Left-back

Team information
- Current team: Công An Nhân Dân
- Number: 12

Youth career
- 2016–2023: PVF

Senior career*
Years	Team	Apps	(Gls)
2021–2022	PVF	9	(0)
2023–	Công An Nhân Dân	60	(0)

International career^{‡}
2022–2023	Vietnam U17	4	(0)
2022–2024	Vietnam U20	22	(2)
2024–	Vietnam U23	9	(1)
Medal record
Men's football
Representing Vietnam
AFF U-19 Youth Championship
Third place	Indonesia 2022	Team
- * Club domestic league appearances and goals as of 12 June 2026 ‡ National team caps and goals as of 14 November 2026

Nguyễn Bảo Long (born 23 August 2005) is a Vietnamese professional footballer who plays as a left-back for V.League 2 club Công An Nhân Dân.

== Early career ==
Born in Bắc Giang, Bao Long has joined the PVF Football Academy in 2016 through the enrollment program. Starting his career as an attacker and later a left midfielder, Bảo Long was converted to a left back by his youth team coach due to his lack of skills to play above. He won the Vietnamese National U-19 Football Championship in 2021.

== Club career ==
Bảo Long participated in the 2021 and 2022 Vietnamese Football League Second Division with PVF.

In 2023, Bảo Long was promoted to PVF Football Academy's first team PVF-CAND. On 16 April 2023, he made his V.League 2 debut in PVF-CAND's goalless draw against Bà Rịa-Vũng Tàu.

== International career ==
In March 2022, Bảo Long was named in Vietnam U17 squad for a training camp in Germany. Later in the year, he was called up to Vietnam national under-19 team for the AFF U-19 Youth Championship. Bảo Long appeared in 6 matches and was a key member in helping Vietnam finish in third place.

In 2023, Bảo Long participated in the 2023 AFC U-20 Championship with Vietnam national under-20s. He didn't appear in any game as Vietnam failed to reach the quarter-finals despite having won two out of their three matches.

== Honours ==
Vietnam U19

- AFF U-19 Youth Championship third place: 2022
- International Thanh Niên Newspaper Cup: 2022

Vietnam U23

- Gia Lai U-23 VTV Cup: 2026
