= Cao Văn Bình =

Vietnamese footballer (born 2005)

Personal information
- Full name: Cao Văn Bình
- Date of birth: 8 January 2005 (age 21)
- Place of birth: Diễn Châu, Nghệ An, Vietnam
- Height: 1.83 m (6 ft 0 in)
- Position: Goalkeeper

Team information
- Current team: Sông Lam Nghệ An
- Number: 1

Youth career
- 2016–2023: Sông Lam Nghệ An

Senior career*
Years	Team	Apps	(Gls)
2023–	Sông Lam Nghệ An	34	(0)

International career^{‡}
2022–2023	Vietnam U17	1	(0)
2022–2024	Vietnam U20	16	(0)
2023–	Vietnam U23	22	(0)
Medal record
Men's football
Representing Vietnam
AFC U-23 Asian Cup
Third place	Saudi Arabia 2026
ASEAN U-23 Championship
Winner	Indonesia 2025
- * Club domestic league appearances and goals as of 20 November 2026 ‡ National team caps and goals as of 14 November 2026

Cao Văn Bình (born 8 January 2005) is a Vietnamese professional footballer who plays as a goalkeeper for V.League 1 club Sông Lam Nghệ An and the Vietnam national under-23 team.

== Early career ==
Văn Bình began his career playing as a forward for his local football team in Diễn Châu. In 2016, during a youth football tournament in Nghệ An, Văn Bình was tested by his manager at the goalkeeper position. Văn Bình performed well and impressed the scouts of Sông Lam Nghệ An. He then joined the team's academy to be trained as a goalkeeper. In 2023, Văn Bình helped the U19 of Sông Lam Nghệ An reach the final of the Vietnamese National U-19 Football Championship before losing against Thanh Hóa U19.

== Club career ==
Văn Bình made his V.League 1 debut for Sông Lam Nghệ An in a 2–0 away defeat to Hà Nội on 10 December 2023. Following the departure of Nguyễn Văn Việt, Văn Bình became the team's first choice goalkeeper for the 2025–26 season.

== International career ==
In March 2022, Văn Bình was selected in a 19-player Vietnam U17 squad for a training camp in Germany. Later in the year, Văn Bình was called up to Vietnam national under-19 team for the AFF U-19 Youth Championship. Văn Bình started in six matches and kept two clean sheets as Vietnam finish in the third place.

In 2023, Văn Bình participated in the 2023 AFC U-20 Asian Cup with Vietnam and played in all three group stage games, keeping one clean sheet against Australia U20.

In 2026, Văn Bình featured in the AFC U-23 Asian Cup in the Vietnam U23. His single appearance in the tournament was against South Korea in the third-place match, where he stopped Bae Hyun-seo's shot to help Vietnam win 7–6 in the penalty shoot-out, gaining the bronze medal.

== Career statistics ==
As of match played 20 November 2026

Appearances and goals by club, season and competition
Club	Season	League			National cup		Continental		Other		Total	
Club	Season	Division	Apps	Goals	Apps	Goals	Apps	Goals	Apps	Goals	Apps	Goals
Sông Lam Nghệ An	2023–24	V.League 1	1	0	1	0	—		—		2	0
Sông Lam Nghệ An	2024–25	V.League 1	2	0	0	0	—		—		2	0
Sông Lam Nghệ An	2025–26	V.League 1	23	0	0	0	—		—		23	0
Sông Lam Nghệ An	2026–27	V.League 1	8	0	1	0	—		—		9	0
Career total			34	0	2	0	0	0	0	0	36	0

== Honours ==
Vietnam U19

- AFF U-19 Youth Championship third place: 2022
- International Thanh Niên Newspaper Cup: 2022

Vietnam U23

- ASEAN U-23 Championship: 2025
- SEA Games gold medal: 2025
- AFC U-23 Asian Cup third place: 2026
- Gia Lai U-23 VTV Cup: 2026
