= Football at the 2009 SEA Games – Men's team squads =

Below are the squads for the Football at the 2009 SEA Games, hosted by Laos, which took place between 2 and 17 December 2009.

== Group A ==
=== Malaysia ===
Coach: K. Rajagopal

No.	Pos.	Player	Date of birth (age)	Caps	Club
1	GK	Farizal Marlias	29 June 1986 (aged 23)		(Malaysia) Perlis
28	GK	Sharbinee Allawee	7 December 1986 (aged 22)		(Malaysia) Terengganu
2	DF	Sabre Abu	8 August 1987 (aged 22)		(Malaysia) Kedah
4	DF	Asraruddin Putra	26 August 1988 (aged 21)		(Malaysia) Selangor
6	DF	Nasriq Baharom	8 February 1987 (aged 22)		(Malaysia) Selangor
7	DF	Aidil Zafuan	3 August 1987 (aged 22)		(Malaysia) Negeri Sembilan
11	DF	Azmi Muslim	17 October 1986 (aged 23)		(Malaysia) Kedah
16	DF	S. Kunanlan	15 September 1986 (aged 23)		(Malaysia) Negeri Sembilan
18	DF	Mazlizam Mohamad	19 September 1986 (aged 23)		(Malaysia) Perlis
24	DF	Muslim Ahmad	25 April 1989 (aged 20)		(Malaysia) Harimau Muda A
10	MF	Safiq Rahim	5 July 1987 (aged 22)		(Malaysia) KL Plus
12	MF	Amar Rohidan	23 April 1987 (aged 22)		(Malaysia) Perlis
15	MF	K. Gurusamy	11 January 1989 (aged 20)		(Malaysia) Harimau Muda A
21	MF	Amirul Hadi	27 May 1986 (aged 23)		(Malaysia) Selangor
23	MF	Baddrol Bakhtiar	1 February 1988 (aged 21)		(Malaysia) Kedah
3	FW	Mahalli Jasuli	2 April 1989 (aged 20)		(Malaysia) Harimau Muda A
8	FW	Zaquan Adha	3 August 1987 (aged 22)		(Malaysia) Negeri Sembilan
9	FW	Norshahrul Idlan	8 June 1986 (aged 23)		(Malaysia) UPB-MyTeam
13	FW	Ahmad Fakri Saarani	8 July 1989 (aged 20)		(Malaysia) Perlis
14	FW	Abdul Manaf Mamat	8 April 1987 (aged 22)		(Malaysia) Terengganu

=== Thailand ===
Coach: (England) Steve Darby

No.	Pos.	Player	Date of birth (age)	Caps	Club
1	GK	Kawin Thamsatchanan	26 January 1990 (aged 19)		(Thailand) Muangthong United
18	GK	Ukrit Wongmeema	9 July 1991 (aged 18)		(Thailand) Buriram
	DF	Kiatprawut Saiwaeo	24 January 1986 (aged 23)		(Thailand) Chonburi
2	DF	Polawat Wangkahart	27 July 1987 (aged 22)		(Thailand) Suphanburi
	DF	Jetsadakorn Hemdaeng	2 March 1986 (aged 23)		(Thailand) Chonburi
16	DF	Sujarit Jantakul	4 March 1989 (aged 20)		(Thailand) Sriracha
5	DF	Suttinan Phuk-hom	29 November 1987 (aged 22)		(Thailand) Chonburi
	DF	Piyachart Tamaphan	5 May 1986 (aged 23)		(Thailand) Muangthong United
3	DF	Theeraton Bunmathan	6 February 1990 (aged 19)		(Thailand) PEA
19	MF	Adul Lahsoh	19 September 1986 (aged 23)		(Thailand) Chonburi
7	MF	Arthit Sunthornpit	19 April 1986 (aged 23)		(Thailand) Chonburi
13	MF	Phanuwat Jinta	6 January 1987 (aged 22)		(Thailand) Chonburi
	MF	Kriangkrai Pimrat	20 February 1987 (aged 22)		(Thailand) Sriracha
8	MF	Apipoo Suntornpanavech	18 July 1986 (aged 23)		(Thailand) PEA
	MF	Sumanya Purisai	5 December 1986 (aged 22)		(Thailand) Osotsapa
12	MF	Kabfah Boonmatoon	12 March 1987 (aged 22)		(Thailand) Osotsapa
15	MF	Anawin Jujeen	13 March 1987 (aged 22)		(Thailand) Bangkok Glass
10	FW	Teerasil Dangda	6 June 1988 (aged 21)		(Thailand) Muangthong United
9	FW	Kirati Keawsombat (c)	12 January 1987 (aged 22)		(Thailand) TOT S.C.
14	FW	Sompong Soleb	30 July 1986 (aged 23)		(Thailand) BBCU

=== Vietnam ===
Coach: (Portugal) Henrique Calisto

== Group B ==
=== Indonesia ===
Coach: (Uruguay) Alberto Bica

No.	Pos.	Player	Date of birth (age)	Caps	Club
1	GK	Frenky Irawan	8 December 1986 (aged 22)		(Indonesia) PSM Makassar
	GK	Muhammad Ridwan	26 March 1991 (aged 18)		(Indonesia) Persita Tangerang
2	DF	Rendy Siregar	14 September 1986 (aged 23)		(Indonesia) Persikota Tangerang
4	DF	Rachmat Latief	27 September 1988 (aged 21)		(Indonesia) PSM Makassar
5	DF	Djayusman Triasdi	22 August 1988 (aged 21)		(Indonesia) PSM Makassar
17	DF	Ruben Sanadi	8 January 1987 (aged 22)		(Indonesia) PSMS Medan
	DF	Wildansyah	3 January 1987 (aged 22)		(Indonesia) Persib Bandung
	DF	Yudi Khoerudin	5 September 1987 (aged 22)		(Indonesia) Persikota Tangerang
	DF	Achmad Jufriyanto	10 May 1987 (aged 22)		(Indonesia) Pelita Jaya
6	MF	Tony Sucipto (c)	12 February 1986 (aged 23)		(Indonesia) Sriwijaya
8	MF	Lucky Wahyu	1 April 1990 (aged 19)		(Indonesia) Persebaya Surabaya
14	MF	Sultan Samma	13 April 1986 (aged 23)		(Indonesia) Persiba Balikpapan
18	MF	Stevie Bonsapia	10 May 1988 (aged 21)		(Indonesia) Persipura Jayapura
	MF	Mahadirga Lasut	17 August 1988 (aged 21)		(Indonesia) Persiraja Banda Aceh
	MF	Nasution Karubaba	27 November 1989 (aged 20)		(Indonesia) Persisam Putra Samarinda
	MF	Egi Melgiansyah	4 September 1990 (aged 19)		(Indonesia) Pelita Jaya
	MF	Fauzan Jamal	6 June 1988 (aged 21)		(Indonesia) Semen Padang
	MF	Johan Juansyah	25 October 1988 (aged 21)		(Indonesia) Persijap Jepara
	MF	Ian Kabes	13 May 1986 (aged 23)		(Indonesia) Persipura Jayapura
7	FW	Boaz Solossa	16 March 1986 (aged 23)		(Indonesia) Persipura Jayapura
10	FW	Yongki Aribowo	23 November 1989 (aged 20)		(Indonesia) Persik Kediri
20	FW	Engelbert Sani	28 May 1990 (aged 19)		(Indonesia) Persiram Raja Ampat
21	FW	Dendi Santoso	16 May 1990 (aged 19)		Arema Indonesia

=== Singapore ===
Coach: Terry Pathmanathon

No.	Pos.	Player	Date of birth (age)	Caps	Club
	GK	Hyrulnizam Juma'at	14 Nov 1986		(Singapore) Young Lions
	GK	Jasper Chan	07 Nov 1988		(Singapore) Young Lions
	DF	Afiq Yunos	10 Dec 1990		(Singapore) Young Lions
	DF	Eddie Affendy Chang	10 May 1990		(Singapore) Young Lions
	DF	Faritz Abdul Hameed	16 Jan 1990		(Singapore) Young Lions
	DF	Irwan Shah	02 Nov 1988		(Singapore) Young Lions
	DF	Madhu Mohana	06 Mar 1991		(Singapore) Young Lions
	DF	Safuwan Baharudin	22 Sep 1991		(Singapore) Young Lions
	DF	Shaiful Esah	12 May 1986		(Singapore) SAFF FC
	MF	Firdaus Idros	12 Aug 1986		(Singapore) Home United
	MF	Gabriel Quak	22 Dec 1990		(Singapore) Young Lions
	MF	Hariss Harun	19 Nov 1990		(Singapore) Young Lions
	MF	Isa Halim	15 May 1986		(Singapore) Home United
	MF	Raihan Abdul Rahman	07 Feb 1991		(Singapore) NFA Under-18
	MF	Shahdan Sulaiman	09 May 1988		(Singapore) Home United
	MF	Yasir Hanapi	21 Jun 1989		(Singapore) Geylang United
	FW	Fadhil Noh	04 Mar 1989		(Singapore) Young Lions
	FW	Fazli Ayob	24 Jan 1990		(Singapore) Young Lions
	FW	Khairul Nizam	25 Jun 1991		(Singapore) NFA Under-18
	FW	Shahfiq Ghani	17 Mar 1992		(Singapore) NFA Under-17

=== Myanmar ===
Coach: (Serbia) Drago Mamic

No.	Pos.	Player	Date of birth (age)	Caps	Club
	FW	Pai Soe	19 July 1986		(Myanmar) Finance and Revenue FC

=== Laos ===
Coach: (Austria) Alfred Riedl

No.	Pos.	Player	Date of birth (age)	Caps	Club
25	FW	Khampheng Sayavutthi	19 July 1986		(Laos) Yotha FC
8	FW	Lamnao Singto	15 April 1988		(Laos) Yotha FC
10	FW	Kanlaya Sysomvang	3 November 1990		(Laos) Yotha FC
