= 2026 Gia Lai U-23 VTV Cup =

International under-23 football tournament

Giải bóng đá giao hữu quốc tế U23 - Gia Lai VTV Cup 2026

Tournament details
- Host country: Vietnam
- City: Gia Lai
- Dates: 10–14 November
- Teams: 4 (from 2 sub-confederations)

Final positions
- Champions: Vietnam (1st title)
- Runners-up: Qatar
- Third place: Thailand
- Fourth place: Singapore

Tournament statistics
- Matches played: 6
- Goals scored: 13 (2.17 per match)
- Top scorer(s): (Vietnam) Nguyễn Minh Tâm (3 goals)
- Best player: (Vietnam) Nguyễn Minh Tâm
- Best goalkeeper: (Vietnam) Cao Văn Bình

The 2026 Gia Lai U-23 VTV Cup, also known as Gia Lai U23 International Friendly Football Tournament - VTV Cup 2026 (Vietnamese: Giải bóng đá giao hữu quốc tế U23 - Gia Lai VTV Cup 2026), iwas the international under-23 men's friendly football tournament organized by the Vietnam Football Federation, Vietnam Television, Gia Lai Provincial Department of Culture, Sports and Tourism and Hoang Anh Gia Lai Group. It was played between 10 and 14 November 2026, featuring four teams, with all matches were held at Pleiku Stadium in Gia Lai province.

== Participating nations ==
Host Vietnam invited the under-23 teams of Thailand, Singapore and Qatar to participate in the tournament.

Nation	Sub-confederation
Vietnam (hosts)	AFF
Thailand	AFF
Singapore	AFF
Qatar	WAFF

== Table ==
Pos	Team	Pld	W	D	L	GF	GA	GD	Pts	
1	Vietnam (H, C)	3	2	1	0	5	1	+4	7	Champion
2	Qatar	3	1	2	0	3	2	+1	5	Runner-up
3	Thailand	3	1	0	2	4	6	−2	3	Third place
4	Singapore	3	0	1	2	1	4	−3	1	Fourth place

Source: VFF
(C) Champions; (H) Hosts

== Matches ==
All times are local (UTC+7)

10 November 2026
15:00

Qatar	0–0	Singapore
	Report

Pleiku Stadium, Gia Lai
Referee: Nguyễn Mạnh Hải (Vietnam)
10 November 2026
19:00

Vietnam	3–0	Thailand
Nguyễn Minh Tâm 17', 45'; Williams Minh Hoàng 88' (pen.)	Report

Pleiku Stadium, Gia Lai
Attendance: 10,011
Referee: Razlan Joffri Ali (Malaysia)

12 November 2026
15:00

Thailand	1–2	Qatar
Phongsakon 90+3' (pen.)	Report	Jarrar 8'; Saleh 18'

Pleiku Stadium, Gia Lai
Referee: Đỗ Khánh Nam (Vietnam)
12 November 2026
19:00

Singapore	0–1	Vietnam
	Report	Nguyễn Bảo Long 70'

Pleiku Stadium, Gia Lai
Attendance: 6,268
Referee: Clifford Daypuyat (Philippines)

14 November 2026
15:00

Thailand	3–1	Singapore
Chaiyasit 33'; Phongsakon 64'; Paripan 79'	Report	Syafiz 41'

Pleiku Stadium, Gia Lai
Referee: Đỗ Khánh Nam (Vietnam)
14 November 2026
19:00

Vietnam	1–1	Qatar
Nguyễn Minh Tâm 48'	Report	Faragalla 20'

Pleiku Stadium, Gia Lai
Attendance: 10,086
Referee: Razlan Joffri Ali (Malaysia)

== Goalscorers ==
There were 13 goals scored in 6 matches, for an average of 2.17 goals per match.

3 goals

- (Vietnam) Nguyễn Minh Tâm

2 goals

- (Thailand) Phongsakon Sangkasopha

1 goal

- (Vietnam) Williams Minh Hoàng
- (Vietnam) Nguyễn Bảo Long
- (Qatar) Yamaan Jarrar
- (Qatar) Mohamed Faragalla
- (Qatar) Jad Saleh
- (Singapore) Amir Syafiz
- (Thailand) Chaiyasit Popoon
- (Thailand) Paripan Wongsa

== See also ==
- 2026 Casper Cup
