= Nguyễn Minh Tâm =

Vietnamese footballer (born 2005)

Personal information
- Full name: Nguyễn Minh Tâm
- Date of birth: 20 November 2005 (age 21)
- Place of birth: Ho Chi Minh City, Vietnam
- Height: 1.80 m (5 ft 11 in)
- Position: Striker

Team information
- Current team: Hoàng Anh Gia Lai
- Number: 12

Youth career
- 2020–2024: Hoàng Anh Gia Lai

Senior career*
Years	Team	Apps	(Gls)
2023–	Hoàng Anh Gia Lai	33	(3)
2023–2024	→ Kon Tum (loan)		
2024–2025	→ Long An (loan)	1	(0)

International career^{‡}
2024	Vietnam U20	3	(0)
2026–	Vietnam U23	6	(4)
- * Club domestic league appearances and goals as of 21 November 2026 ‡ National team caps and goals as of 14 November 2026

Nguyễn Minh Tâm (born 20 November 2005) is a Vietnamese professional footballer who plays as a striker for V.League 1 club Hoàng Anh Gia Lai.

== Early career ==
Minh Tâm played a crucial role helping Hoàng Anh Gia Lai win the 2024 Vietnamese National U-21 Football Championship. In the 2025 edition, he finished as top scorer.

== Club career ==
After loaning spells at Kon Tum and Long An, Minh Tâm was recalled to Hoàng Anh Gia Lai in January 2025. for one season. On 3 October 2025, he scored his first goal at professional level in a 1–1 V.League 1 draw against Sông Lam Nghệ An. On 7 January 2026, he scored a goal to help his team defeat league leader Ninh Bình.

== Playing style ==
Minh Tâm has been compared to Lê Công Vinh for his explosive pace, intelligent positioning and his clinical finishing inside the penalty area.

== Honours ==
Vietnam U23

- Gia Lai U-23 VTV Cup: 2026

Individual

- Vietnamese National U-21 Football Championship top scorer: 2025
