= Pleiku Stadium =

Multi-use stadium in Pleiku, Vietnam

Coordinates: 13°58′45″N 108°00′18″E

- Pleiku Arena
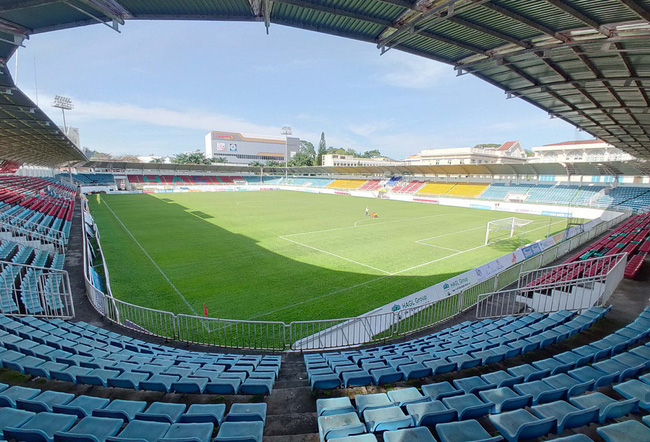
- Interactive map of Pleiku Stadium
- Location: Pleiku, Vietnam
- Capacity: 12,000

Tenant
- Hoang Anh Gia Lai F.C.

Pleiku Stadium (Vietnamese: Sân vận động Pleiku), also known as Pleiku Arena, is a football stadium in Pleiku, Vietnam. It is used mostly for football matches and is the home stadium of Hoang Anh Gia Lai, or HAGL (also a company). The stadium holds 13,000 people.
